= Juan Manuel Correa =

Ecuadorian and American racing driver (born 1999)

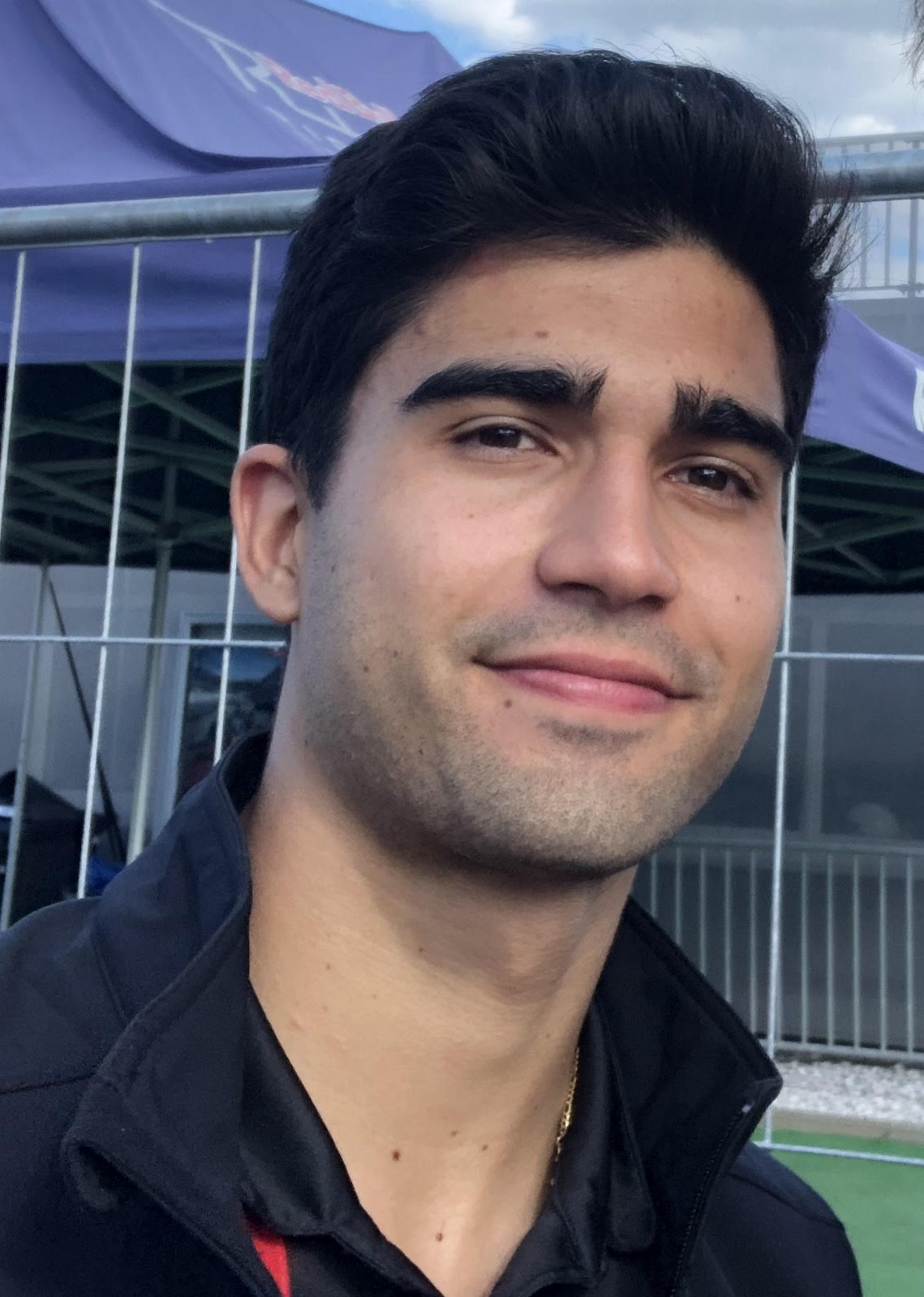
- Correa in 2022
- Nationality: Ecuadorian; American via dual nationality
- Full name: Juan Manuel Correa Borja
- Born: August 9, 1999 (age 27) Quito, Ecuador
- Relatives: Rodrigo Borja Cevallos (grandfather)

Indy NXT career
- Debut season: 2025
- Current team: Cusick Morgan Motorsports
- Categorisation: FIA Silver
- Car number: 68
- Starts: 26 (26 entries)
- Wins: 0
- Podiums: 2
- Poles: 0
- Fastest laps: 0
- Best finish: 7th in 2026

Previous series
- 2019, 2022–2024 2023 2022 2021–2022 2018 2017–2018 2016–2017 2016–2017: FIA Formula 2 FIA WEC; ELMS; FIA Formula 3 Toyota Racing Series; GP3; ADAC F4; Italian F4

Juan Manuel "J.M." Correa Borja (Spanish pronunciation: [ˈxwam maˈnwel koˈre.a ˈβoɾxa]; born August 9, 1999) is an Ecuadorian and American racing driver who currently competes in the 2026 Indy NXT with Cusick Morgan Motorsports. He previously competed in the FIA Formula 2 Championship from 2022 until 2024 with Van Amersfoort Racing and DAMS Lucas Oil. Aside from his single-seater career, he has also competed as a silver-ranked driver in the LMP2 category, winning a race in the European Le Mans Series.

In 2019, Correa sustained critical leg injuries in an accident at Spa-Francorchamps in Formula 2, which led to the death of fellow driver Anthoine Hubert. After skipping a year to focus on his recovery, Correa went on to drive in FIA F3 with ART Grand Prix before returning to Formula 2 at the end of 2022.

Correa is the grandson of former President of Ecuador Rodrigo Borja Cevallos, making him a descendant of Pope Alexander VI.

== Junior racing career ==
=== Karting ===
Correa began karting professionally in 2008, taking titles across Ecuador and the United States, becoming the Rotax Max Challenge Junior Champion in 2013. During his karting days, he was noticed by the now-defunct Formula One team Lotus F1's driver's program.

=== Formula 4 ===
==== 2016 ====
In 2016, Correa made his single-seater debut with Prema Powerteam in both the ADAC Formula 4 and Italian F4 championships. Over the campaign, he amassed three wins and claimed sixth in Italian F4 and tenth in ADAC F4.

==== 2017 ====
The following year, Correa repeated this campaign, but mostly focusing on ADAC F4.

=== GP3 Series ===
==== 2017 ====
In August 2017, Correa made his debut in the series at the Spa-Francorchamps round with Jenzer Motorsport.

==== 2018 ====
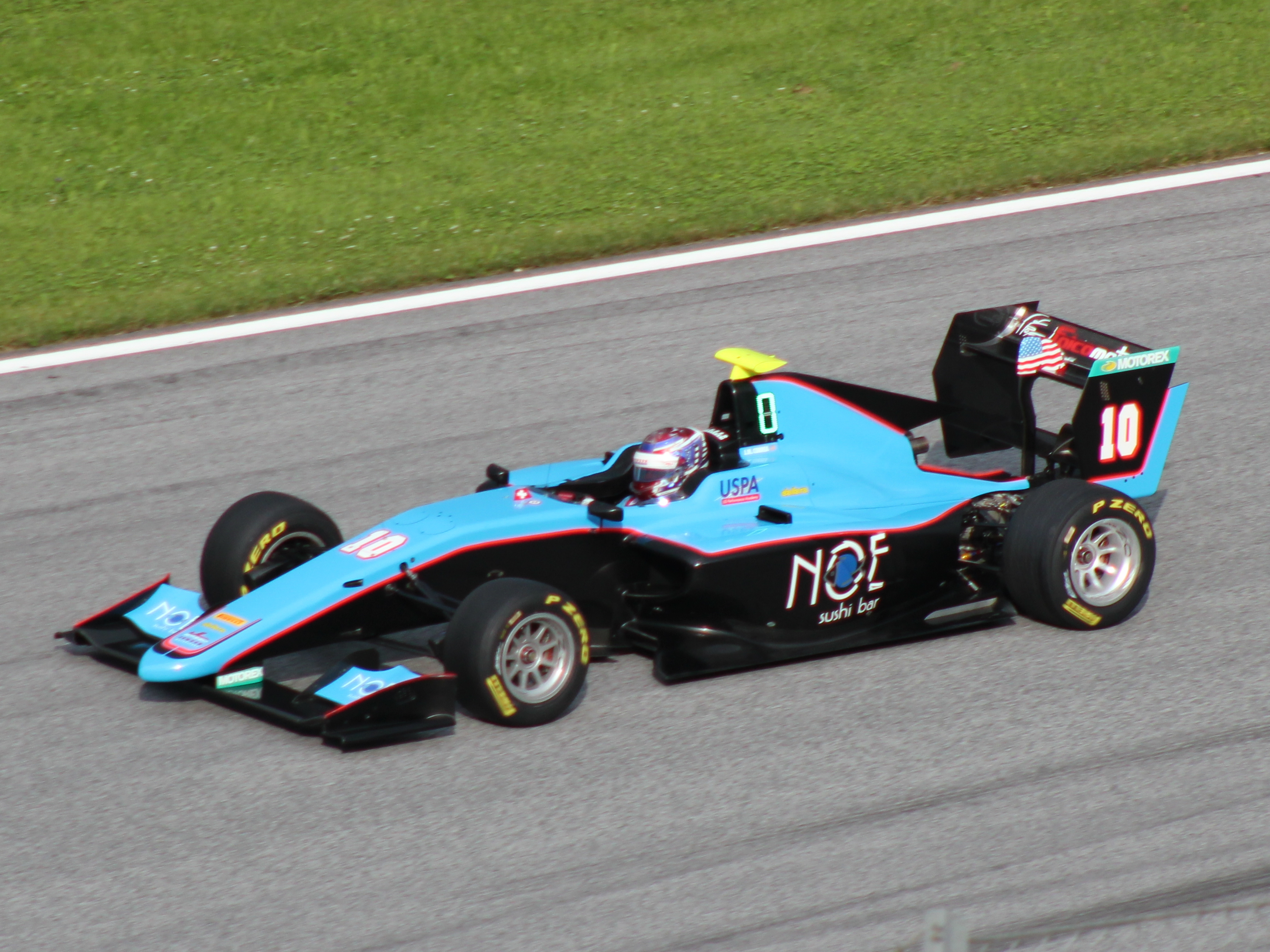
Correa at the 2018 Spielberg GP3 Series round with Jenzer Motorsport

Correa signed with Jenzer Motorsport for the full-time campaign in 2018 GP3 Series. He was unable to amass any podiums, despite starting from reverse grid pole on two occasions in the sprint race. Nevertheless, he scored 42 points and finished twelfth in the standings, four positions ahead of his only full-time teammate Tatiana Calderón.

=== FIA Formula 2 Championship ===
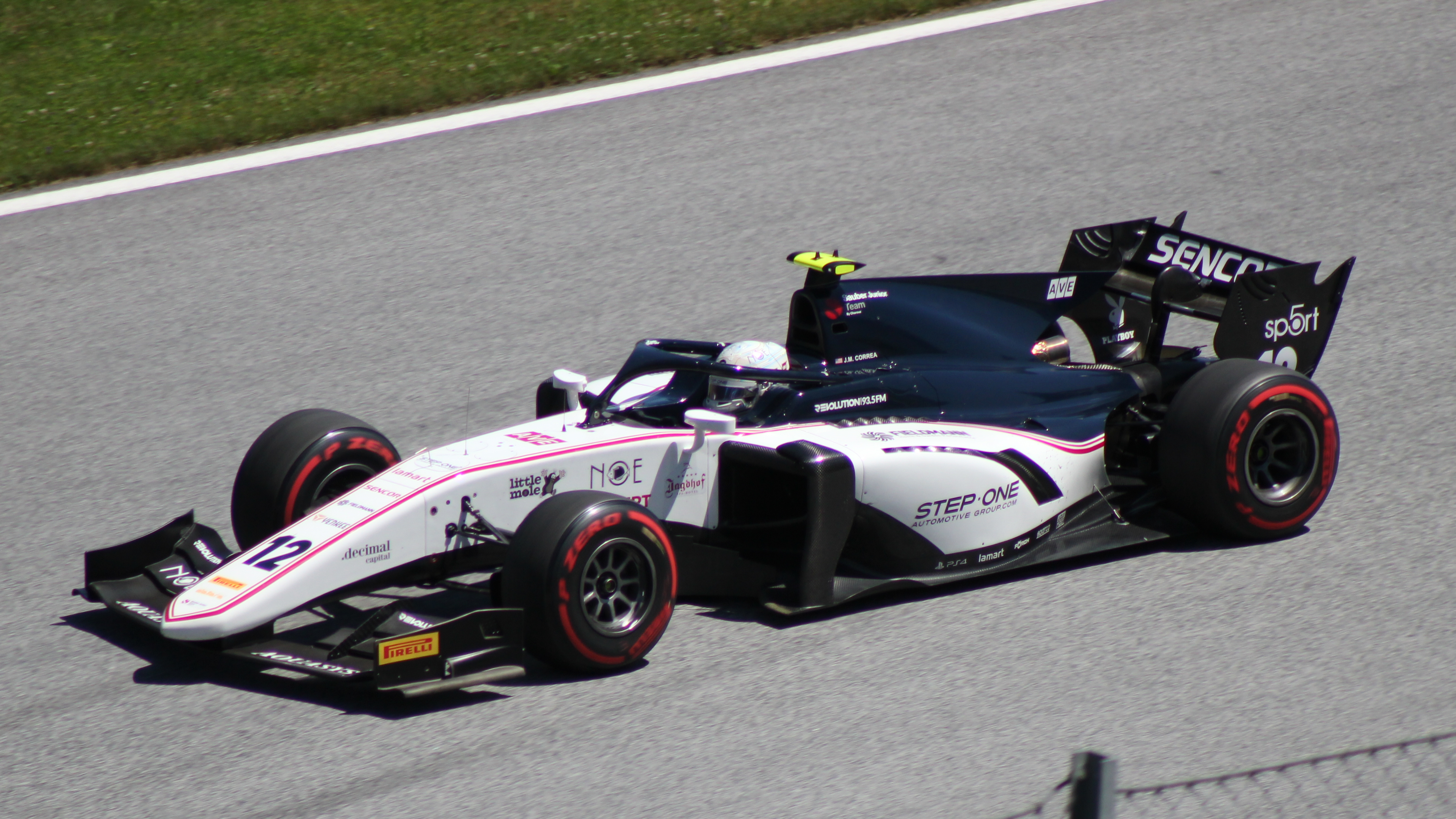
Correa driving the Dallara F2 2018 during the 2019 Spielberg Formula 2 round

2019 was Correa's first full FIA Formula 2 season, alongside teammate Callum Ilott for Sauber Junior Team by Charouz. His first round did not go well, with finishes outside the top-fifteen. Correa's fortunes changed at Baku however, where, after finishing seventh in the feature race and scoring his first ever Formula 2 points, he achieved a second place finish in the Sprint Race. Through the next rounds in Barcelona and Monaco, Correa failed to score any points, but he returned to the podium at Le Castellet, where he got another second place, crossing the finish line just two seconds behind Anthoine Hubert. These would be Correa's final points finish of the season, with three consecutive weekends without points leading up to the round at Spa-Francorchamps.

==== Accident at Spa-Francorchamps ====
On August 31, 2019, Correa was involved in a serious crash with Anthoine Hubert on the second lap of the feature race of the 2019 Spa-Francorchamps Formula 2 round, Belgium. Hubert subsequently died from his injuries, and Correa's injuries were severe enough to eliminate him from further competition in the 2019 Formula 2 season. Correa hit Hubert's car at 218 km/h (135 mph), registering a peak g-force of 65G. Correa's media team released a statement a few hours after the accident confirming that he had suffered fractures to both of his legs and a minor spinal injury. They also stated that he had been helicoptered to hospital, had undergone a four-hour surgery, and had been admitted to intensive care. His condition was described as stable. He was reported to have remained conscious following the crash. On September 7, a statement issued by Correa's family confirmed that he was diagnosed with acute respiratory distress syndrome after being transferred to an intensive care unit in London, and had been placed in an induced coma under ECMO support after falling into acute respiratory failure.

On September 20, Correa's family issued a statement confirming that Correa had been taken out of ECMO support, and had been woken from the induced coma. The family further confirmed that medical priority had been shifted from Correa's lungs to his legs, as critical surgery could not be performed until his lungs had recovered enough to withstand a lengthy procedure. By September 28, Correa's lungs were strong enough to proceed; Correa opted for an approach to save as much of his right leg as possible, as opposed to a first step involving the amputation of his foot. The surgery was scheduled for September 29. The reconstructive surgery was largely deemed a success, though Correa faced at least a year of rehabilitation after his injuries. Correa was announced as the winner of the FIA Americas award in the car category, receiving his award in person from his wheelchair on January 14, 2020. He was given a standing ovation from the audience, which included FIA officials that had flown to Panama City, Panama, from Geneva, Switzerland for the event: Deputy President of Sport, Graham Stoker; and Deputy President of Mobility and Tourism, Thierry Willemarck.

==== Controversy during recovery ====
Correa complained, in an interview with NTV published on January 28, 2020, that the FIA had ignored him and left him without support during his recovery. He said:

"Everyone went to Monza the next day after the accident, I stayed in the hospital and I almost died four days after the accident. And there was nobody in the FIA or someone who looked after me. [...] The reason that I almost died was because of the strong G-forces that you can only have after such a serious accident. The doctors in the hospital in Belgium didn't know what that was because they have never seen anyone who has survived such a big impact." — (Translated from German)

Dr. Christian Wahlen, the chief medical officer at Spa at the time of the accident, responded to this on January 28, 2020. He said that Correa had received "immediate medical care" from the doctor attending the scene of the accident, "administered by the circuit-appointed doctor who is an experienced anaesthetist". Wahlen went on to say that "the activities of medical staff attending the accident were coordinated by FIA deputy F1 medical delegate and F1 rescue coordinator doctor Ian Roberts", and that Correa was flown to Liege hospital after "consulting with doctor Alain Chantegret, FIA F1 medical delegate". Wahlen also claims that he and President of the FIA Institute Gérard Saillant, a leading orthopaedic surgeon, were both constantly updating the family during the following days.

Wahlen said that "On Tuesday morning Juan Manuel developed symptoms indicating a respiratory problem. On the same day, the Correa family took the decision to transfer him to a specialist clinic at a hospital in London". The interview details the involvement of FIA doctors over the three days of Sunday to Tuesday, and that Correa was taken out of their immediate care. On February 10, 2020, Correa clarified the situation surrounding the first article. He stated that the article, written by a journalist from essentiallysports.com, was out of context. Correa said:

"The fact is that many of the statements ascribed to me are either taken out of context or simply not accurate. And while I am sure that the journalist involved had only the best intentions, I think it is critical that I set the record straight. As you all know, I have the utmost respect for the journalists that cover our sport and support us, but I cannot allow remarks that I did not make go on the record undisputed. Secondly, I have not accused anyone of anything. I have merely pointed out facts related to the sequence of events that occurred post-accident, how my family and myself experienced that ordeal, and the many lessons that all of us can learn from this unfortunate event. [...] Again, the investigation is ongoing, and I trust the lessons learned will be incorporated as part of its recommendations."

In a video interview with The Race, published on February 15, 2020, Correa opens up about the aftermath of the accident. He states that he saw his legs were shattered, and "it seemed like they were [only] connected by the suit, they were like gelatine". He asked the doctor at the scene of the crash "to put me to sleep because of the pain. I went into the coma, and I woke up from the coma two weeks later, so actually I really regained my consciousness about three weeks after the crash."

=== FIA Formula 3 Championship ===
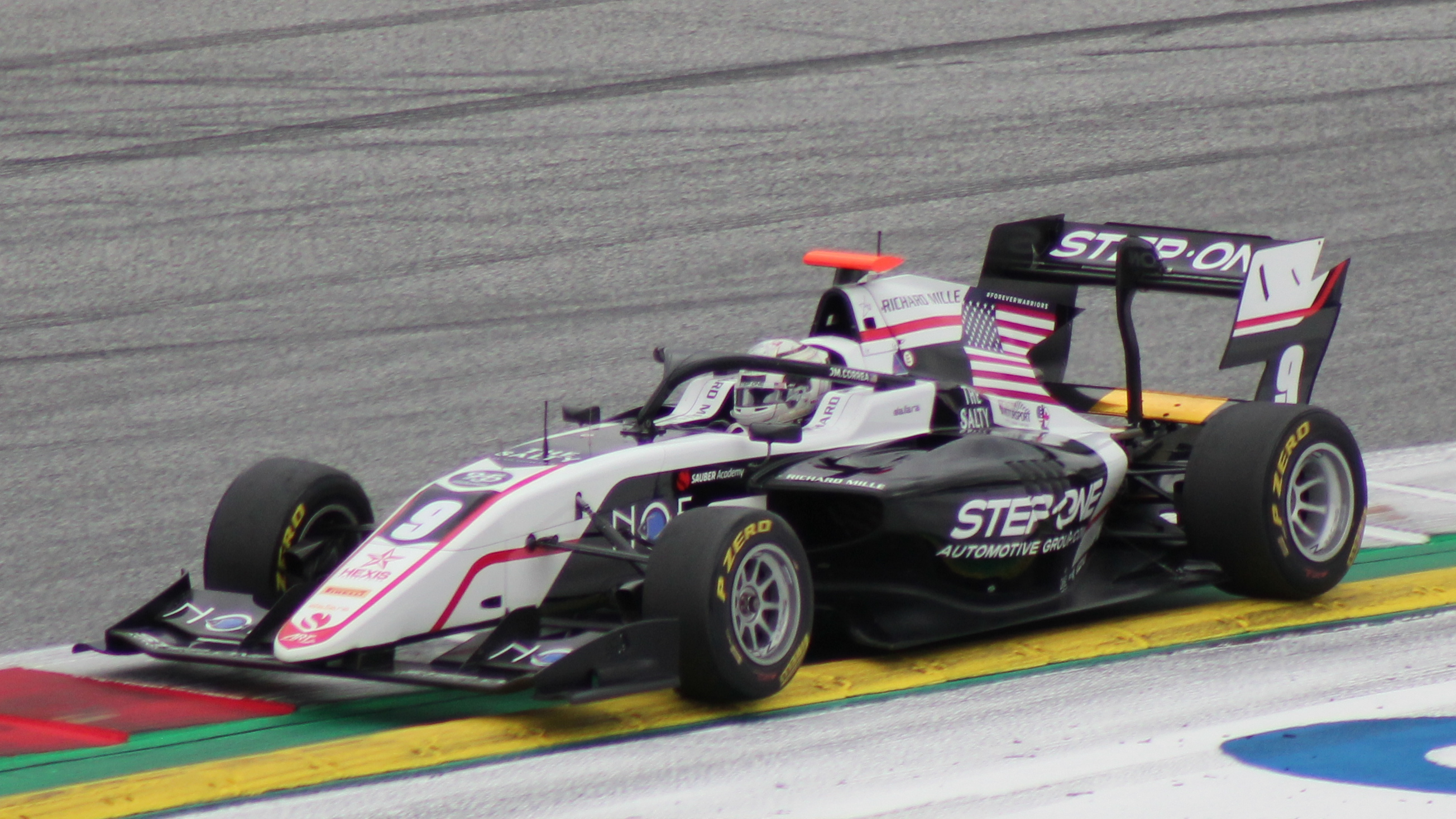
Correa driving the Dallara F3 2019 during the 2021 Spielberg Formula 3 round

==== 2021 ====
Correa made his racing comeback in the 2021 FIA Formula 3 Championship with ART Grand Prix, partnering Frederik Vesti and Aleksandr Smolyar. He scored his first point of his return in the second race of the season at the Circuit de Barcelona-Catalunya. His next points came at the second round in Le Castellet, where he finished sixth in the first sprint race and ninth in the feature race, collecting seven points. Correa achieved two more points finishes during the year and finished the season 21st in the championship with eleven points. Correa later took part in post-season testing with ART Grand Prix at the Circuit Ricardo Tormo.

==== 2022 ====
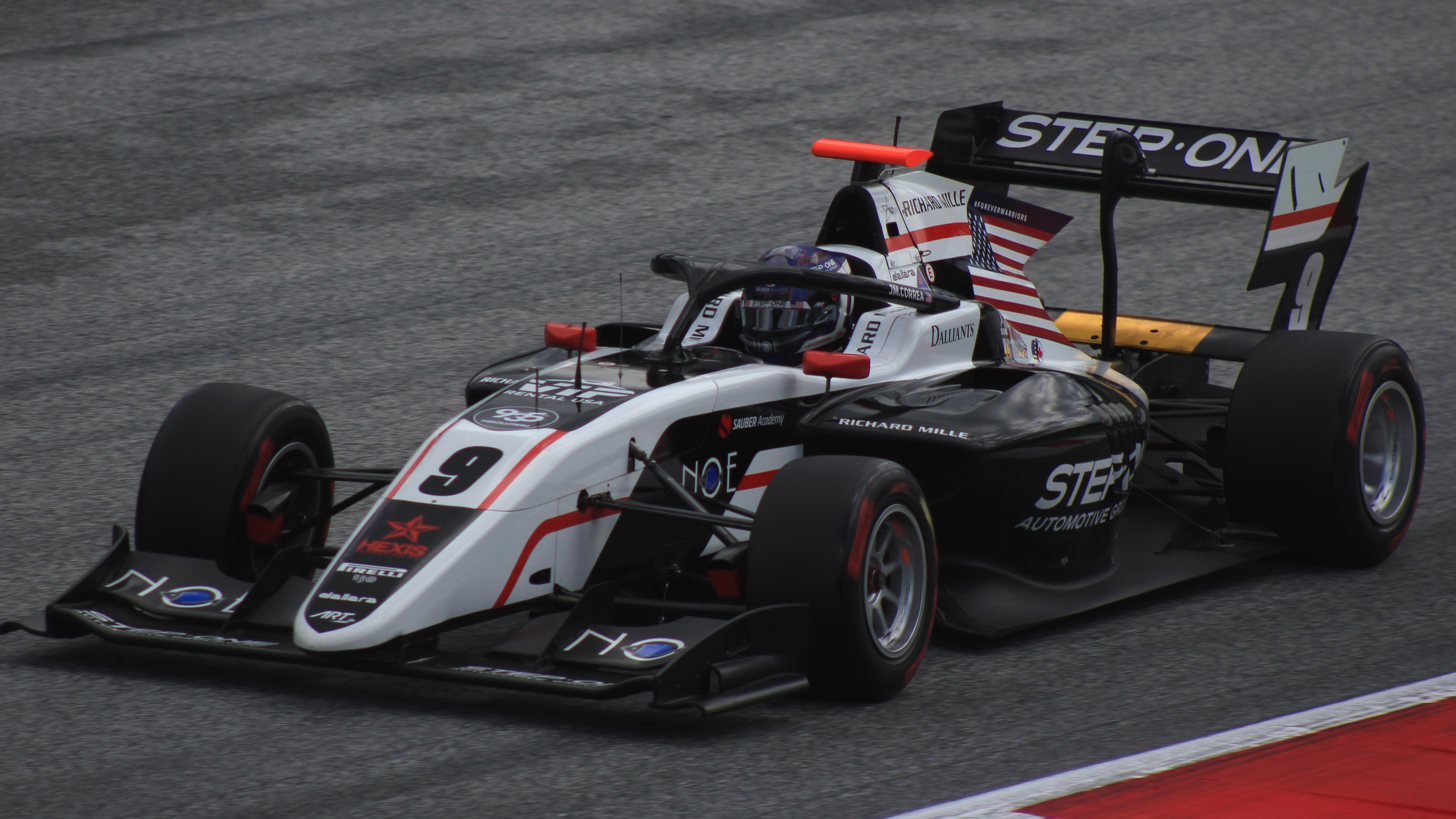
Correa driving for ART Grand Prix during the 2022 Spielberg Formula 3 round

Correa remained with ART Grand Prix for the 2022 season. He finished thirteenth in the final standings, eight places better than prior season, and having scored a podium at Zandvoort sprint race.

=== Return to Formula 2 ===
==== 2021 ====
In 2021, Correa tested for his old team Charouz Racing System in the post-season test, but did not end up driving for them due to his commitments in his F3 return.

==== 2022 ====
Correa replaced David Beckmann and made his return to the FIA Formula 2 Championship in 2022, driving for Van Amersfoort Racing during the Yas Marina season finale. Making his first F2 start in more than three years, he described that he was "ready for the challenge no matter what happens". After qualifying 18th, Correa was the fifteenth driver to see the checkered flag in the sprint race. However, the slight improvement from his grid slot was short lived, as he received a five-second time penalty for causing a collision with Marino Sato after the race, dropping him back into eighteenth place. In the feature race, he finished seventeenth, to end the championship in 27th place. Following that, he remained with his team for post-season testing.

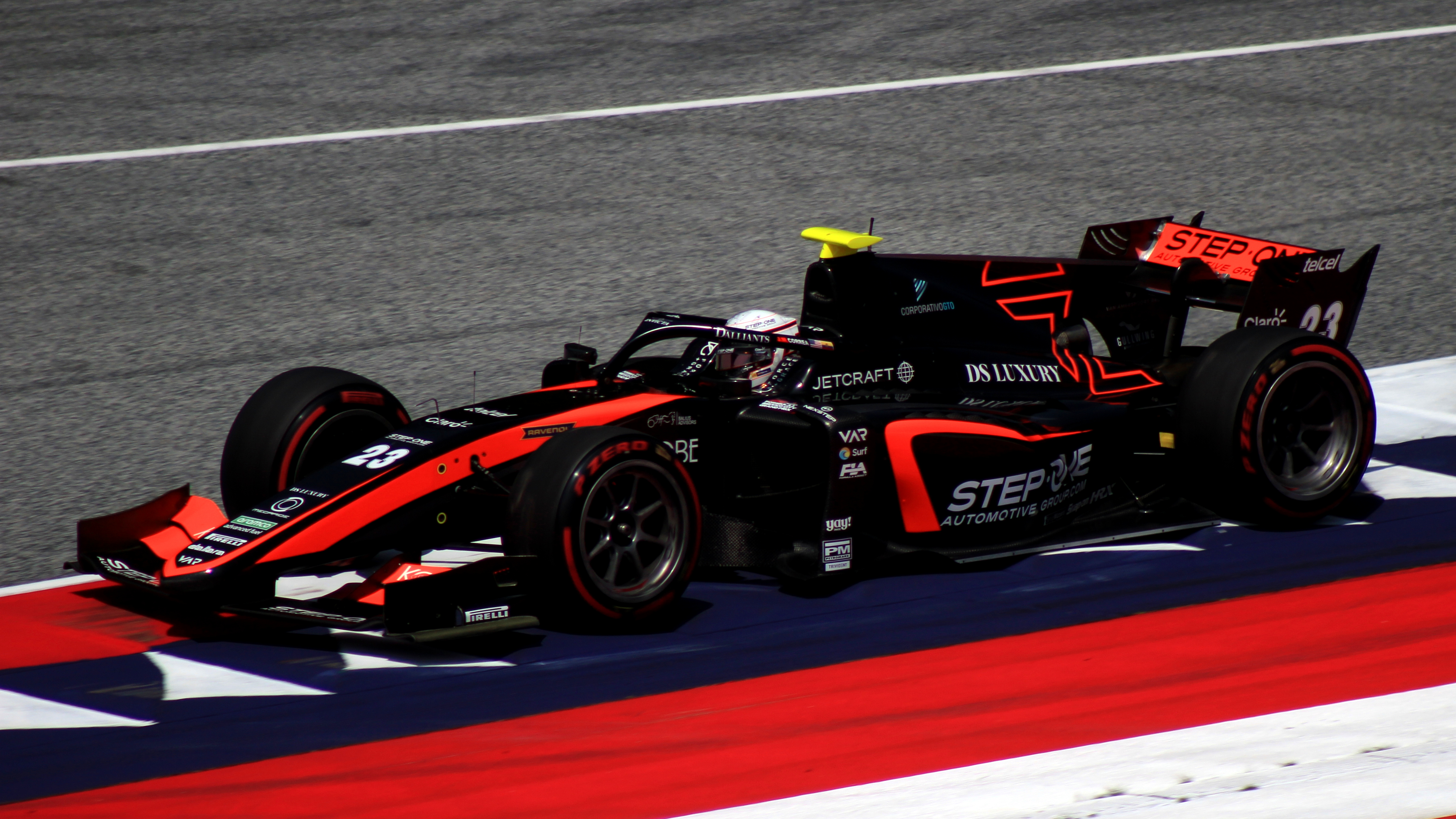
Correa driving for Van Amersfoort Racing during the 2023 Spielberg Formula 2 round

==== 2023 ====
Correa made his full-time return to Formula 2 in 2023 with Van Amersfoort Racing, partnering Richard Verschoor. Having scored points on six occasions, the American ended up nineteenth in the standings.

==== 2024 ====
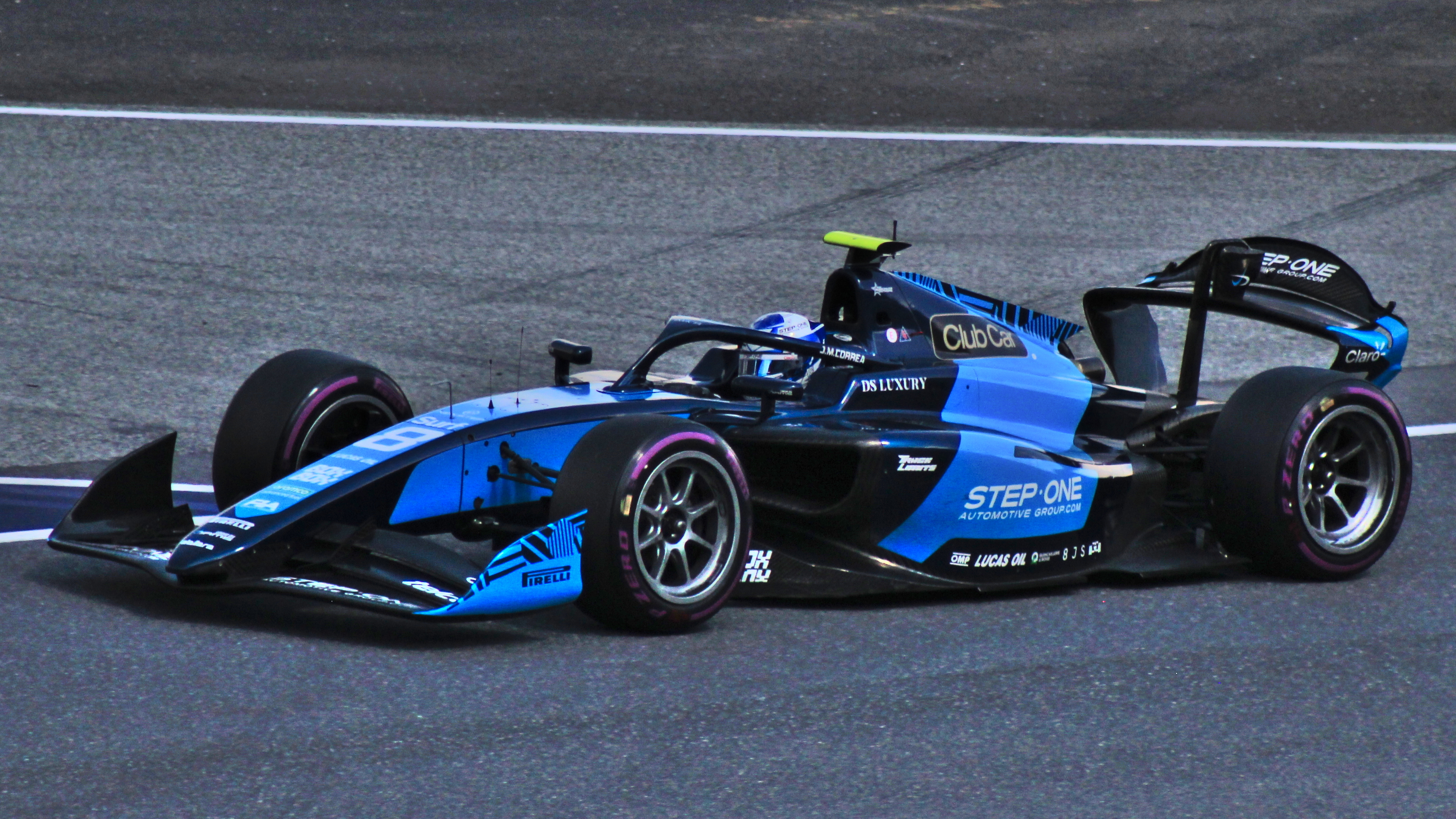
Correa driving for DAMS Lucas Oil during the 2024 Spielberg Formula 2 round

In 2024, Correa switched to DAMS Lucas Oil, forming an all-American lineup alongside Jak Crawford. Following the Baku round, Correa was replaced by Formula 3 graduate and Ferrari Driver Academy driver Dino Beganovic.

=== Formula One ===
During his karting years, Correa was put into the junior program of the Lotus F1 Team, but was dropped following the team's takeover by Renault. He was signed as Alfa Romeo Racing's development driver for the 2019 season. In August 2019, Correa got his first experience of an F1 car with the 2013 Sauber C32 at Circuit Paul Ricard, completing 62 laps. After recovering from his accident throughout 2020, Correa was announced to have re-signed with the Sauber Junior Team for 2021.

=== Indy NXT ===
==== 2025 season ====
In 2025, Correa joined HMD Motorsports to race in selected rounds in the 2025 Indy NXT season, beginning at the Indianapolis Motor Speedway road course.

==== 2026 season ====
Correa joined Cusick Morgan Motorsports for his first full season of Indy NXT in 2026.

== Endurance racing career ==
At the end of 2021, Correa tested Prema Powerteam's LMP2 endurance racing car, the first time he drove an endurance racing car.

=== 2022 season ===
In February 2022, Prema Powerteam announced that Correa would participate in the 2022 European Le Mans Series with them. Due to Formula 3 commitments and an injury, he only contested the final two rounds; the team came third at Spa-Francorchamps on Correa's debut. He won his first endurance race during the season finale in Portimão, helping Prema become the teams' champions.

=== 2023 season ===
Correa raced the No. 9 car with Prema Racing in the LMP2 category of the FIA World Endurance Championship in 2023, partaking in all rounds which did not clash with his F2 commitments. The trio of Correa, Bent Viscaal, and Filip Ugran attained two top-five finishes and concluded the season sitting ninth out of eleven teams in the LMP2 standings.

=== 2025 season ===
In March 2025, Correa was announced to drive in the IMSA SportsCar Championship with United Autosports, in the LMP2 category.

== Other racing ==
=== Super Formula ===
In December 2024, Correa partook in a Super Formula test at the Suzuka Circuit with Kondo Racing.

== Karting record ==
=== Karting career summary ===
Season	Series	Team	Position
2008	Florida Winter Tour — Rotax Micro Max	MRP Motorsport	2nd
2011	South Florida RMAX Challenge — Rotax Mini Max		8th
2011	SKUSA SuperNationals — TaG Cadet		39th
2012	Florida Winter Tour — Rotax Junior		7th
2012	AM Engines Formula Tag — Junior		3rd
2012	CIK-FIA European Championship — KF3	Kartune Motorsport	109th
2012	SKUSA SuperNationals — TaG Junior		79th
2012	Rotax Max Challenge Grand Finals — Junior	Maxspeed Group	22nd
2013	Florida Winter Tour — Rotax Junior		5th
2013	Florida Winter Tour — MDD Formula TaG Junior		2nd
2013	Rotax Euro Challenge — Rotax Junior		24th
2013	Rotax International Open — Rotax Junior		27th
2013	Rotax Max Challenge Grand Finals — Junior		1st
2014	South Garda Winter Cup — KFJ	Energy Corse	33rd
2014	WSK Champions Cup — KFJ	Energy Corse	18th
2014	Andrea Margutti Trophy — KFJ	Energy Corse	20th
2014	WSK Super Master Series — KFJ	Energy Corse	11th
2014	CIK-FIA European Championship — KFJ	Energy Corse	14th
2014	SKUSA SuperNationals — TaG Junior	Energy Corse	6th
2014	CIK-FIA World Championship — KFJ	Energy Corse	16th
2014	WSK Final Cup — KFJ	Energy Corse	5th
2015	WSK Champions Cup — KF	Energy Corse	8th
2015	South Garda Winter Cup — KF	Energy Corse	7th
2015	WSK Gold Cup — KF	Energy Corse	22nd
2015	Andrea Margutti Trophy — KF	Energy Corse	26th
2015	WSK Super Master Series — KF	Energy Corse	15th
2015	CIK-FIA European Championship — KF	Energy Corse	5th
2015	International Super Cup — KZ2	Energy Corse	NC
2015	CIK-FIA World Championship — KF	Energy Corse	28th

== Racing record ==
=== Racing career summary ===
Season	Series	Team	Races	Wins	Poles	F/Laps	Podiums	Points	Position
2016	ADAC Formula 4 Championship	Prema Powerteam	24	0	0	2	1	91	10th
2016	Italian F4 Championship	Prema Powerteam	18	3	2	1	4	105.5	6th
2017	ADAC Formula 4 Championship	Prema Powerteam	15	0	0	1	1	86	10th
2017	Italian F4 Championship	Prema Powerteam	6	0	0	0	0	10	NC†
2017	GP3 Series	Jenzer Motorsport	7	0	0	0	0	0	21st
2018	GP3 Series	Jenzer Motorsport	18	0	0	0	0	42	12th
2018	Toyota Racing Series	M2 Competition	15	2	1	2	3	756	4th
2019	FIA Formula 2 Championship	Sauber Junior Team by Charouz	16	0	0	0	2	36	13th
2019	Formula One	Alfa Romeo Racing	Development driver						
2021	FIA Formula 3 Championship	ART Grand Prix	20	0	0	0	0	11	21st
2022	FIA Formula 3 Championship	ART Grand Prix	16	0	0	0	1	39	13th
2022	European Le Mans Series - LMP2	Prema Racing	2	1	0	1	2	40	7th
2022	FIA Formula 2 Championship	Van Amersfoort Racing	2	0	0	0	0	0	27th
2023	FIA Formula 2 Championship	Van Amersfoort Racing	26	0	0	0	0	13	19th
2023	FIA World Endurance Championship - LMP2	Prema Racing	4	0	0	0	0	34	15th
2023	24 Hours of Le Mans - LMP2	Prema Racing	1	0	0	0	0	N/A	16th
2024	FIA Formula 2 Championship	DAMS Lucas Oil	24	0	0	0	1	31	18th
2025	Indy NXT	HMD Motorsports	9	0	0	0	1	176	17th
2025	IMSA SportsCar Championship - LMP2	United Autosports USA	4	0	1	0	0	1061	28th
2026	Indy NXT	Cusick Morgan Motorsports	17	0	0	0	1	389	7th

^{†} Correa did not compete in the required number of rounds to be eligible for a championship position.

* Season still in progress.

=== Complete Italian F4 Championship results ===
(key) (Races in bold indicate pole position) (Races in italics indicate fastest lap)

Year	Team	1	2	3	4	5	6	7	8	9	10	11	12	13	14	15	16	17	18	19	20	21	22	23	Pos	Points
2016	Prema Powerteam	MIS; 1; 3	MIS; 2; 4	MIS; 3	MIS; 4 Ret	ADR; 1	ADR; 2	ADR; 3	ADR; 4	IMO1; 1 Ret	IMO1; 2; 9	IMO1; 3; 1	**MUG**; **1**; 1	**MUG**; **2**; 16	MUG; 3; 9	VLL; 1; 5	VLL; 2; 10	VLL; 3; 1	IMO2; 1 Ret	IMO2; 2; 4	IMO2; 3; 5	MNZ; 1; 11	MNZ; 2; 23	MNZ; 3; 19	6th	105.5
2017	Prema Powerteam	MIS; 1 Ret	MIS; 2; 10	MIS; 3; 20	ADR; 1	ADR; 2	ADR; 3	VLL; 1	VLL; 2	VLL; 3	MUG1; 1; 9	MUG1; 2; 8	MUG1; 3; 18	IMO; 1	IMO; 2	IMO; 3	MUG2; 1	MUG2; 2	MUG2; 3	MNZ; 1	MNZ; 2	MNZ; 3			NC†	10

^{†} Correa did not compete in the required number of rounds to be eligible for a championship position.

=== Complete ADAC Formula 4 Championship results ===
(key) (Races in bold indicate pole position) (Races in italics indicate fastest lap)

Year	Team	1	2	3	4	5	6	7	8	9	10	11	12	13	14	15	16	17	18	19	20	21	22	23	24	Pos	Points
2016	Prema Powerteam	OSC1; 1 Ret	OSC1; 2; 6	OSC1; 3; 20	SAC; 1; 6	SAC; 2; 9	SAC; 3; 6	LAU; 1; 12	LAU; 2; 9	LAU; 3; 11	OSC2; 1; 5	OSC2; 2; 9	OSC2; 3; 3	RBR; 1 Ret	RBR; 2; 18	RBR; 3; 11	NÜR; 1; 6	NÜR; 2; 4	NÜR; 3; 30	ZAN; 1; 6	ZAN; 2; 9	ZAN; 3; 4	HOC; 1 Ret	HOC; 2 Ret	HOC; 3; 30	10th	91
2017	Prema Powerteam	OSC1; 1; 5	OSC1; 2; 5	OSC1; 3; 4	LAU; 1 Ret	LAU; 2; 5	LAU; 3; 8	RBR; 1; 11	RBR; 2; 2	RBR; 3 Ret	OSC2; 1; 19	OSC2; 2; 4	OSC2; 3; 17	NÜR; 1; 13	NÜR; 2; 15	NÜR; 3; 7	SAC; 1	SAC; 2	SAC; 3	HOC; 1	HOC; 2	HOC; 3				10th	86

=== Complete GP3 Series/FIA Formula 3 Championship results ===
(key) (Races in bold indicate pole position) (Races in italics indicate fastest lap)

Year	Entrant	1	2	3	4	5	6	7	8	9	10	11	12	13	14	15	16	17	18	19	20	21	Pos	Points
2017	Jenzer Motorsport	CAT; FEA	CAT; SPR	RBR; FEA	RBR; SPR	SIL; FEA	SIL; SPR	HUN; FEA	HUN; SPR	SPA; FEA; 15	SPA; SPR; Ret	MNZ; FEA; Ret	MNZ; SPR; C	JER; FEA; 15	JER; SPR; 16	YMC; FEA; 12	YMC; SPR; 12						21st	0
2018	Jenzer Motorsport	CAT; FEA; 8	CAT; SPR; 4	LEC; FEA; 9	LEC; SPR; 12	RBR; FEA; 19	RBR; SPR; 13	SIL; FEA; Ret	SIL; SPR; 15	HUN; FEA; 7	HUN; SPR; 5	SPA; FEA; 11	SPA; SPR; 10	MNZ; FEA; 17	MNZ; SPR; Ret	SOC; FEA; 9	SOC; SPR; 5	YMC; FEA; 8	YMC; SPR; 6				12th	42
2021	ART Grand Prix	CAT; 1; 15	CAT; 2; 10	CAT; 3; 14	LEC; 1; 6	LEC; 2; 16	LEC; 3; 9	RBR; 1; 10	RBR; 2; 24	RBR; 3; 14	HUN; 1; 14	HUN; 2; 14	HUN; 3; 14	SPA; 1; 22	SPA; 2; 18	SPA; 3; 21	ZAN; 1; 28	ZAN; 2; 17	ZAN; 3; 27	SOC; 1; 9	SOC; 2 C	SOC; 3; 11	21st	11
2022	ART Grand Prix	BHR; SPR; 9	BHR; FEA; 4	IMO; SPR	IMO; FEA	CAT; SPR; 5	CAT; FEA; 10	SIL; SPR; 21	SIL; FEA; Ret	RBR; SPR; Ret	RBR; FEA; 10	HUN; SPR; 12	HUN; FEA; 6	SPA; SPR; 17	SPA; FEA; 15	ZAN; SPR; 2	ZAN; FEA; 24	MNZ; SPR; 13	MNZ; FEA; 24				13th	39

=== Complete Toyota Racing Series results ===
(key) (Races in bold indicate pole position) (Races in italics indicate fastest lap)

Year	Team	1	2	3	4	5	6	7	8	9	10	11	12	13	14	15	DC	Points
2018	M2 Competition	RUA; 1; 10	RUA; 2; 6	RUA; 3; 8	TER; 1; 6	TER; 2; 1	TER; 3; 7	HMP; 1; 3	HMP; 2; 4	HMP; 3; 4	**TAU**; **1**; 1	TAU; 2; 9	TAU; 3; 4	MAN; 1; 6	MAN; 2; 6	MAN; 3; 4	4th	756

=== Complete European Le Mans Series results ===
(key) (Races in bold indicate pole position; results in italics indicate fastest lap)

Year	Entrant	Class	Chassis	Engine	1	2	3	4	5	6	Rank	Points
2022	Prema Racing	LMP2	Oreca 07	Gibson GK428 4.2 L V8	LEC	IMO	MNZ	CAT	SPA; 3	ALG; 1	7th	40

=== Complete FIA Formula 2 Championship results ===
(key) (Races in bold indicate pole position) (Races in italics indicate points for the fastest lap of top ten finishers)

Year	Entrant	1	2	3	4	5	6	7	8	9	10	11	12	13	14	15	16	17	18	19	20	21	22	23	24	25	26	27	28	DC	Points
2019	Sauber Junior Team by Charouz	BHR; FEA; 16	BHR; SPR; 18	BAK; FEA; 7	BAK; SPR; 2	CAT; FEA; Ret	CAT; SPR; 15	MON; FEA; 16†	MON; SPR; 12	LEC; FEA; 7	LEC; SPR; 2	RBR; FEA; 11	RBR; SPR; 10	SIL; FEA; 12	SIL; SPR; 10	HUN; FEA; 14	HUN; SPR; 14	SPA; FEA; C	SPA; SPR; C	MNZ; FEA	MNZ; SPR	SOC; FEA	SOC; SPR	YMC; FEA	YMC; SPR					13th	36
2022	Van Amersfoort Racing	BHR; SPR	BHR; FEA	JED; SPR	JED; FEA	IMO; SPR	IMO; FEA	CAT; SPR	CAT; FEA	MCO; SPR	MCO; FEA	BAK; SPR	BAK; FEA	SIL; SPR	SIL; FEA	RBR; SPR	RBR; FEA	LEC; SPR	LEC; FEA	HUN; SPR	HUN; FEA	SPA; SPR	SPA; FEA	ZAN; SPR	ZAN; FEA	MNZ; SPR	MNZ; FEA	YMC; SPR; 18	YMC; FEA; 17	27th	0
2023	Van Amersfoort Racing	BHR; SPR; 10	BHR; FEA; 10	JED; SPR; 14	JED; FEA; 18	MEL; SPR; 14	MEL; FEA; 10	BAK; SPR; 6	BAK; FEA; 13	MCO; SPR; 16	MCO; FEA; 14	CAT; SPR; Ret	CAT; FEA; 11	RBR; SPR; 4	RBR; FEA; 18	SIL; SPR; 19	SIL; FEA; 11	HUN; SPR; 20	HUN; FEA; 9	SPA; SPR; 16	SPA; FEA; 16	ZAN; SPR; 4	ZAN; FEA; 10	MNZ; SPR; 18	MNZ; FEA; 14	YMC; SPR; Ret	YMC; FEA; 13			19th	13
2024	DAMS Lucas Oil	BHR; SPR; 12	BHR; FEA; Ret	JED; SPR; Ret	JED; FEA; 14	MEL; SPR; 11	MEL; FEA; 14	IMO; SPR; 15	IMO; FEA; 8	MON; SPR; 12	MON; FEA; 5	CAT; SPR; 8	CAT; FEA; 3	RBR; SPR; 16	RBR; FEA; 14	SIL; SPR; 12	SIL; FEA; 20	HUN; SPR; 8	HUN; FEA; 16	SPA; SPR; 17	SPA; FEA; 11	MNZ; SPR; 17	MNZ; FEA; Ret	BAK; SPR; 15	BAK; FEA; Ret	LSL; SPR	LSL; FEA	YMC; SPR	YMC; FEA	18th	31

^{†} Driver did not finish the race, but was classified for completed over 90% of the race distance.

=== Complete FIA World Endurance Championship results ===
(key) (Races in bold indicate pole position) (Races in italics indicate fastest lap)

Year	Entrant	Class	Chassis	Engine	1	2	3	4	5	6	7	Rank	Points
2023	Prema Racing	LMP2	Oreca 07	Gibson GK428 4.2 L V8	SEB	ALG; 5	SPA	LMS; 10	MNZ	FUJ; 8	BHR; 4	15th	34

=== Complete 24 Hours of Le Mans results ===
Year	Team	Co-drivers	Car	Class	Laps	Pos.	Class pos.
2023	(Italy) Prema Racing	(Romania) Filip Ugran (Netherlands) Bent Viscaal	Oreca 07-Gibson	LMP2	310	34th	16th

=== Complete IMSA SportsCar Championship results ===
Year	Entrant	Class	Chassis	Engine	1	2	3	4	5	6	7	Rank	Points
2025	United Autosports USA	LMP2	Oreca 07	Gibson GK428 V8	DAY	SEB; 5	WGL; 10	MOS	ELK	**IMS**; 6	PET; 9	28th	1061

=== American open–wheel racing results ===
==== Indy NXT ====
(key) (Races in bold indicate pole position) (Races in italics indicate fastest lap) (Races with ^{L} indicate a race lap led) (Races with * indicate most race laps led)

Year	Team	1	2	3	4	5	6	7	8	9	10	11	12	13	14	15	16	17	Rank	Points
2025	HMD Motorsports	STP	BAR	IMS; 21	IMS; 14	DET; 3	GMP; 8	RDA	MOH; 8	IOW; 12	LAG; 15	LAG; 17	POR; 9	MIL	NSH				17th	176
2026	Cusick Morgan Motorsports	STP; 9	ARL; 4	BAR; 11	BAR; 8	IMS; 12	IMS; 11	DET; 9	GAT; 14	ROA; 7	ROA; 7	MOH; 22	MOH; 4	NSS; 23	POR; 6	MIL; 2	LAG; 4	LAG; 12	7th	389

^{*} Season still in progress.
