= 2021 Sochi Formula 3 round =

(Russia) 2021 Sochi Formula 3 round
Round details
- Round 7 of 7 in the 2021 FIA Formula 3 Championship.
- Location: Sochi Autodrom, Sochi, Russia
- Course: Permanent Circuit; 5.848 km (3.634 mi)

Sprint race 1
- Date: 25 September 2021
- Laps: 20
Podium
First	(United States) Logan Sargeant	Charouz Racing System
Second	(Norway) Dennis Hauger	Prema Racing
Third	(France) Victor Martins	MP Motorsport
Fastest lap
Driver	(France) Clément Novalak	Trident
- Time: 1:56.259 (on lap 14)

Sprint race 2
- Date: 25 September 2021
- Laps: 20
Podium
First	Race cancelled	N/A
Second	Race cancelled	N/A
Third	Race cancelled	N/A
Fastest lap
Driver	Race cancelled	N/A
- Time: NC

Feature race
- Date: 26 September 2021
- Laps: 20
Pole position
Driver	(Australia) Jack Doohan	Trident
Time	1:54.514	
Podium
First	(Australia) Jack Doohan	Trident
Second	(Denmark) Frederik Vesti	ART Grand Prix
Third	(France) Clément Novalak	Trident
Fastest lap
Driver	(Monaco) Arthur Leclerc	Prema Racing
- Time: 1:56.051 (on lap 20)

The 2021 Sochi Formula 3 round was the final race of the 2021 FIA Formula 3 Championship. It took place at the Sochi Autodrom and featured three races from 24 to 26 September in support of the 2021 Russian Grand Prix.

Dennis Hauger clinched the drivers' championship in the first race after a second-placed finish. However, Trident clinched their first teams' championship ever in Formula 3 after securing a double podium lock-up in the Feature Race, with Jack Doohan winning his fourth race of the season whilst teammate Clément Novalak finished third.

== Classification ==
=== Qualifying ===
Pos.	No.	Driver	Team	Time/Gap	Grid
1	4	(Australia) Jack Doohan	Trident	1:54.514	1
2	5	(France) Clément Novalak	Trident	+0.134	2
3	27	(United Kingdom) Johnathan Hoggard	Jenzer Motorsport	+0.173	3
4	7	(Denmark) Frederik Vesti	ART Grand Prix	+0.198	4
5	9	(United States) Juan Manuel Correa	ART Grand Prix	+0.241	5
6	21	(Italy) Lorenzo Colombo	Campos Racing	+0.245	6
7	8	(Russia) Alexander Smolyar	ART Grand Prix	+0.251	7
8	18	(Brazil) Caio Collet	MP Motorsport	+0.258	8
9	1	(Norway) Dennis Hauger	Prema Racing	+0.312	9
10	10	(United States) Jak Crawford	Hitech Grand Prix	+0.339	10
11	29	(United States) Logan Sargeant	Charouz Racing System	+0.345	11
12	17	(France) Victor Martins	MP Motorsport	+0.445	12
13	12	(Czech Republic) Roman Staněk	Hitech Grand Prix	+0.463	13
14	2	(Monaco) Arthur Leclerc	Prema Racing	+0.575	14
15	3	(United Kingdom) Olli Caldwell	Prema Racing	+0.637	15
16	15	(Denmark) Oliver Rasmussen	HWA Racelab	+0.652	16
17	6	(Germany) David Schumacher	Trident	+0.714	17
18	11	(Japan) Ayumu Iwasa	Hitech Grand Prix	+0.788	18
19	14	(Italy) Matteo Nannini	HWA Racelab	+0.905	19
20	22	(Belgium) Amaury Cordeel	Campos Racing	+0.952	20
21	26	(Australia) Calan Williams	Jenzer Motorsport	+0.989	21
22	24	(United States) Kaylen Frederick	Carlin Buzz Racing	+1.166	22
23	16	(Mexico) Rafael Villagómez	HWA Racelab	+1.493	23
24	28	(Romania) Filip Ugran	Jenzer Motorsport	+1.749	24
25	19	(Netherlands) Tijmen van der Helm	MP Motorsport	+2.011	25
26	30	(United Kingdom) Ayrton Simmons	Charouz Racing System	+2.013	26
27	20	(Hungary) László Tóth	Campos Racing	+2.086	27
28	23	(Israel) Ido Cohen	Carlin Buzz Racing	+2.515	28
29	31	(Portugal) Zdeněk Chovanec	Charouz Racing System	+2.650	29
30	25	(United Kingdom) Jonny Edgar	Carlin Buzz Racing		30

=== Sprint Race 1 ===
Pos.	No.	Driver	Team	Laps	Time/Gap	Grid	Pts.
1	29	(United States) Logan Sargeant	Charouz Racing System	20	39:23.780	2	15
2	1	(Norway) Dennis Hauger	Prema Racing	20	+0.649	4	12
3	17	(France) Victor Martins	MP Motorsport	20	+3.466	1	10
4	5	(France) Clément Novalak	Trident	20	+4.597	11	8 (2)
5	18	(Brazil) Caio Collet	MP Motorsport	20	+5.424	5	6
6	21	(Italy) Lorenzo Colombo	Campos Racing	20	+11.632	7	5
7	2	(Monaco) Arthur Leclerc	Prema Racing	20	+14.514	14	4
8	7	(Denmark) Frederik Vesti	ART Grand Prix	20	+17.589	9	3
9	9	(United States) Juan Manuel Correa	ART Grand Prix	20	+18.138	8	2
10	11	(Japan) Ayumu Iwasa	Hitech Grand Prix	20	+22.891	6	1
11	10	(United States) Jak Crawford	Hitech Grand Prix	20	+23.487	3	
12	27	(United Kingdom) Johnathan Hoggard	Jenzer Motorsport	20	+23.979	10	
13	12	(Czech Republic) Roman Staněk	Hitech Grand Prix	20	+24.494	13	
14	6	(Germany) David Schumacher	Trident	20	+24.963	17	
15	4	(Australia) Jack Doohan	Trident	20	+25.350	12	
16	14	(Italy) Matteo Nannini	HWA Racelab	20	+29.856	19	
17	3	(United Kingdom) Olli Caldwell	Prema Racing	20	+31.005	15	
18	25	(United Kingdom) Jonny Edgar	Carlin Buzz Racing	20	+35.572	30	
19	26	(Australia) Calan Williams	Jenzer Motorsport	20	+36.277	21	
20	16	(Mexico) Rafael Villagómez	HWA Racelab	20	+38.366	23	
21	22	(Belgium) Amaury Cordeel	Campos Racing	20	+41.146	20	
22	8	(Russia) Alexander Smolyar	ART Grand Prix	20	+50.032	6	
23	24	(United States) Kaylen Frederick	Carlin Buzz Racing	20	+53.354	22	
24	30	(United Kingdom) Ayrton Simmons	Charouz Racing System	20	+56.692	26	
25	28	(Romania) Filip Ugran	Jenzer Motorsport	20	+57.449	24	
26	31	(Portugal) Zdeněk Chovanec	Charouz Racing System	20	+1:33.501	29	
27	23	(Israel) Ido Cohen	Carlin Buzz Racing	19	+1 lap	28	
DNF	19	(Netherlands) Tijmen van der Helm	MP Motorsport	15	Engine	25	
DNF	15	(Denmark) Oliver Rasmussen	HWA Racelab	1	Damage	16	
DNF	20	(Hungary) László Tóth	Campos Racing	1	Damage	27	
Fastest lap set by (France) Clément Novalak: 1:56.259 (lap 14)

=== Sprint Race 2 ===
Sprint Race 2 was cancelled due to adverse weather conditions.

=== Feature Race ===
Pos.	No.	Driver	Team	Laps	Time/Gap	Grid	Pts.
1	4	(Australia) Jack Doohan	Trident	20	39:00.001	1	25 (4)
2	7	(Denmark) Frederik Vesti	ART Grand Prix	20	+3.111	4	18
3	5	(France) Clément Novalak	Trident	20	+3.758	2	15
4	29	(United States) Logan Sargeant	Charouz Racing System	20	+7.445	11	12
5	10	(United States) Jak Crawford	Hitech Grand Prix	20	+9.695	10	10
6	27	(United Kingdom) Johnathan Hoggard	Jenzer Motorsport	20	+10.368	3	8
7	2	(Monaco) Arthur Leclerc	Prema Racing	20	+15.281	14	6 (2)
8	17	(France) Victor Martins	MP Motorsport	20	+18.860	12	4
9	11	(Japan) Ayumu Iwasa	Hitech Grand Prix	20	+23.641	18	2
10	3	(United Kingdom) Olli Caldwell	Prema Racing	20	+25.738	15	1
11	9	(United States) Juan Manuel Correa	ART Grand Prix	20	+26.855	5	
12	26	(Australia) Calan Williams	Jenzer Motorsport	20	+27.370	21	
13	24	(United States) Kaylen Frederick	Carlin Buzz Racing	20	+36.227	22	
14	25	(United Kingdom) Jonny Edgar	Carlin Buzz Racing	20	+36.732	30	
15	6	(Germany) David Schumacher	Trident	20	+37.208	17	
16	22	(Belgium) Amaury Cordeel	Campos Racing	20	+37.583	20	
17	14	(Italy) Matteo Nannini	HWA Racelab	20	+38.944	19	
18	19	(Netherlands) Tijmen van der Helm	MP Motorsport	20	+43.183	25	
19	28	(Romania) Filip Ugran	Jenzer Motorsport	20	+52.999	24	
20	31	(Portugal) Zdeněk Chovanec	Charouz Racing System	20	+58.271	29	
21	30	(United Kingdom) Ayrton Simmons	Charouz Racing System	20	+58.635	PL	
22	20	(Hungary) László Tóth	Campos Racing	20	+1:02.130	27	
23	8	(Russia) Alexander Smolyar	ART Grand Prix	20	+1:08.788	7	
24	1	(Norway) Dennis Hauger	Prema Racing	20	+1:38.800	9	
25	15	(Denmark) Oliver Rasmussen	HWA Racelab	18	+2 laps	16	
26	12	(Czech Republic) Roman Staněk	Hitech Grand Prix	18	+2 laps	13	
DNF	23	(Israel) Ido Cohen	Carlin Buzz Racing			28	
DNF	16	(Mexico) Rafael Villagómez	HWA Racelab			23	
DNF	21	(Italy) Lorenzo Colombo	Campos Racing			6	
DNF	18	(Brazil) Caio Collet	MP Motorsport	1	Collision damage	8	
Fastest lap set by (Monaco) Arthur Leclerc: 1:56.051 (lap 20)

== Final championship standings ==
Drivers' Championship standings

	Pos.	Driver	Points
	1	(Norway) Dennis Hauger	205
	2	(Australia) Jack Doohan	179
	3	(France) Clément Novalak	147
1	4	(Denmark) Frederik Vesti	138
1	5	(France) Victor Martins	131

Teams' Championship standings

	Pos.	Team	Points
1	1	(Italy) Trident	381
1	2	(Italy) Prema Racing	377
	3	(France) ART Grand Prix	256
	4	(Netherlands) MP Motorsport	224
1	5	(Czech Republic) Charouz Racing System	127

- Note: Only the top five positions are included for both sets of standings.
- Note: Bold names include both Drivers' and Teams' Champion respectively.

== See also ==
- 2021 Russian Grand Prix
- 2021 Sochi Formula 2 round

Previous round: 2021 Zandvoort Formula 3 round	FIA Formula 3 Championship; 2021 season	Next round: 2022 Sakhir Formula 3 round
Previous round: 2019 Sochi Formula 3 round	Sochi Formula 3 round	Next round: none
