= Jonny Edgar =

British racing driver (born 2004)

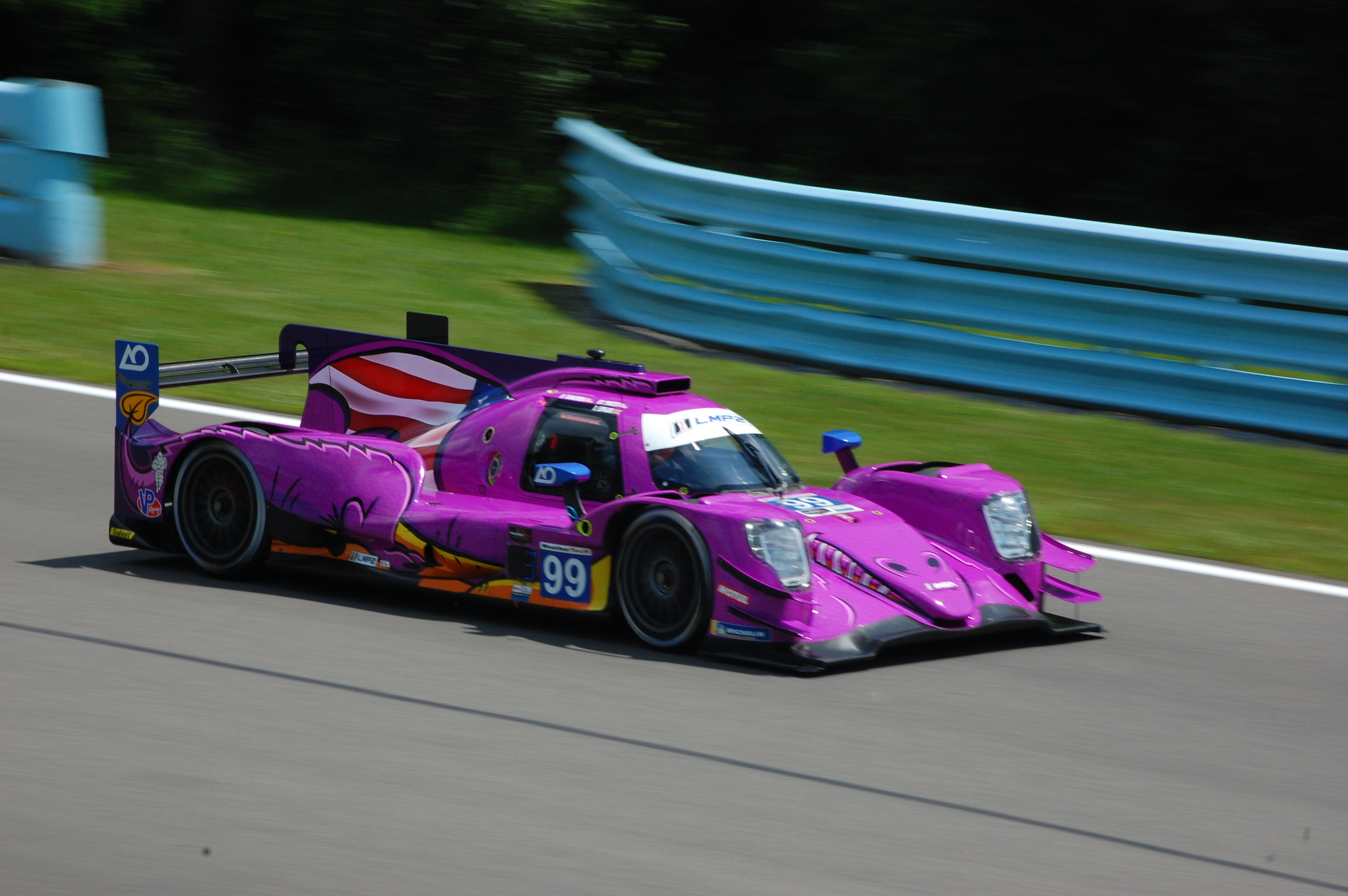
- Edgar driving the AO Racing Oreca 07 during the 2025 Sahlen's Six Hours of The Glen
- Nationality: (United Kingdom) British
- Born: 13 February 2004 (age 22) Whitehaven, Cumbria, England
- Relatives: Jessica Edgar (cousin)

FIA World Endurance Championship career
- Debut season: 2025
- Current team: TF Sport
- Categorisation: FIA Silver (2023–2026); FIA Gold (2027–)
- Car number: 33
- Starts: 16 (16 entries)
- Wins: 2
- Podiums: 4
- Poles: 0
- Fastest laps: 1
- Best finish: 1st in 2026

Previous series
- 2024 2021–2023 2019–2020 2019–2020 2019: European Le Mans Series; FIA Formula 3 Championship; ADAC Formula 4 Italian F4 Championship; F4 Spanish Championship

Championship titles
- 2026 2024 2020: FIA World Endurance Championship - LMGT3; European Le Mans Series – LMP2; ADAC Formula 4 Championship

Jonny Edgar (born 13 February 2004) is a British professional racing driver who competes in the Asian Le Mans Series with Car Blanche by RSL. He is set to become a Corvette factory driver from 2027 onwards.

In 2026, Edgar won the 24 Hours of Le Mans in the LMGT3 class alongside Nicky Catsburg and Ben Keating, before winning both the LMGT3 Driver’s and Team’s championships in the FIA World Endurance Championship later that year.

== Early career ==
=== Karting ===
Born in Whitehaven, Edgar started his career in 2012, being in the fourth generation of Edgars to practice motor racing. Edgar began his karting career with Fusion Motorsport in Britain, finishing second in the Super 1 National Championship just three years after his debut. He also won the SKUSA SuperNationals that year, driving for Team Benik. His karting highlight came in 2017, when he won the CIK-FIA European Championship in the OKJ-category on his first attempt, having beaten the likes of Hadrien David, Zane Maloney and Jack Doohan. In Edgar's final year of karting, he managed to finish third in the WSK Super Master Series, having remained with Forza Racing.

=== Lower formulae ===
==== 2019 ====
In 2019, Edgar made his car racing debut in the Italian F4 Championship, driving for Jenzer Motorsport, whilst also competing in selected rounds of the ADAC Formula 4 Championship as a guest driver. He scored two podiums, namely a second-place finish at Imola and third at Mugello. Edgar scored a further two pole positions and two fastest laps, and with 97 points the Red Bull Junior finished tenth in the standings.

==== 2020 ====
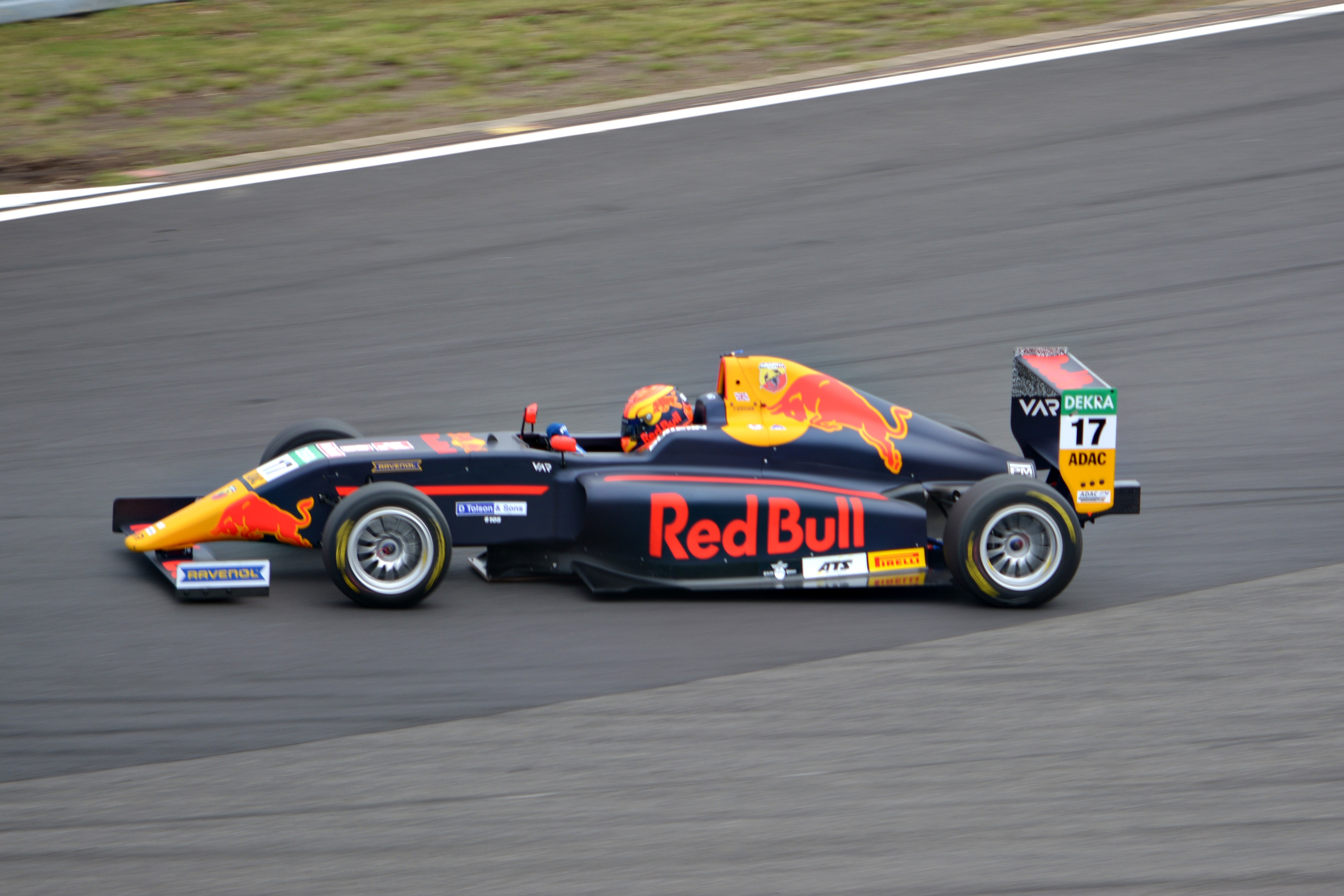
Edgar racing in the 2020 ADAC Formula 4 Championship

In 2020, Edgar would continue to race in both the Italian and German Formula 4 Championships, however, due to the COVID-19 pandemic he would only compete part-time in the former. He signed for Van Amersfoort Racing, partnering fellow Red Bull Junior Team member Jak Crawford. Edgar ended up winning the ADAC Formula 4 Championship with a gap of just two points to Crawford thanks to a charge up the grid in the final race. He finished fourth in Italian F4, winning at Imola and the season finale in Vallelunga, despite having missed two race weekends.

=== FIA Formula 3 Championship ===
==== 2021 ====
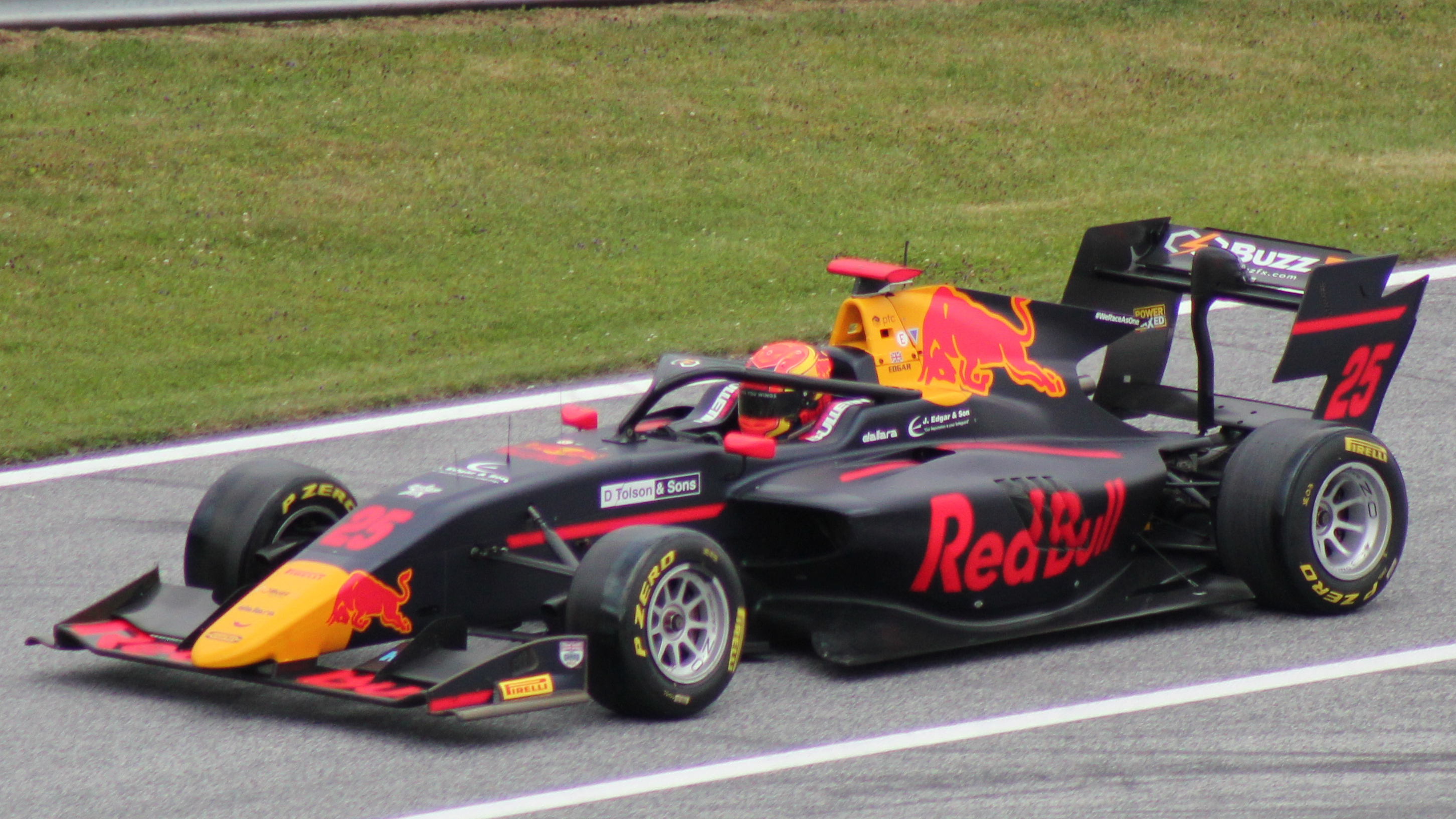
Edgar driving for Carlin during the 2021 Spielberg Formula 3 round

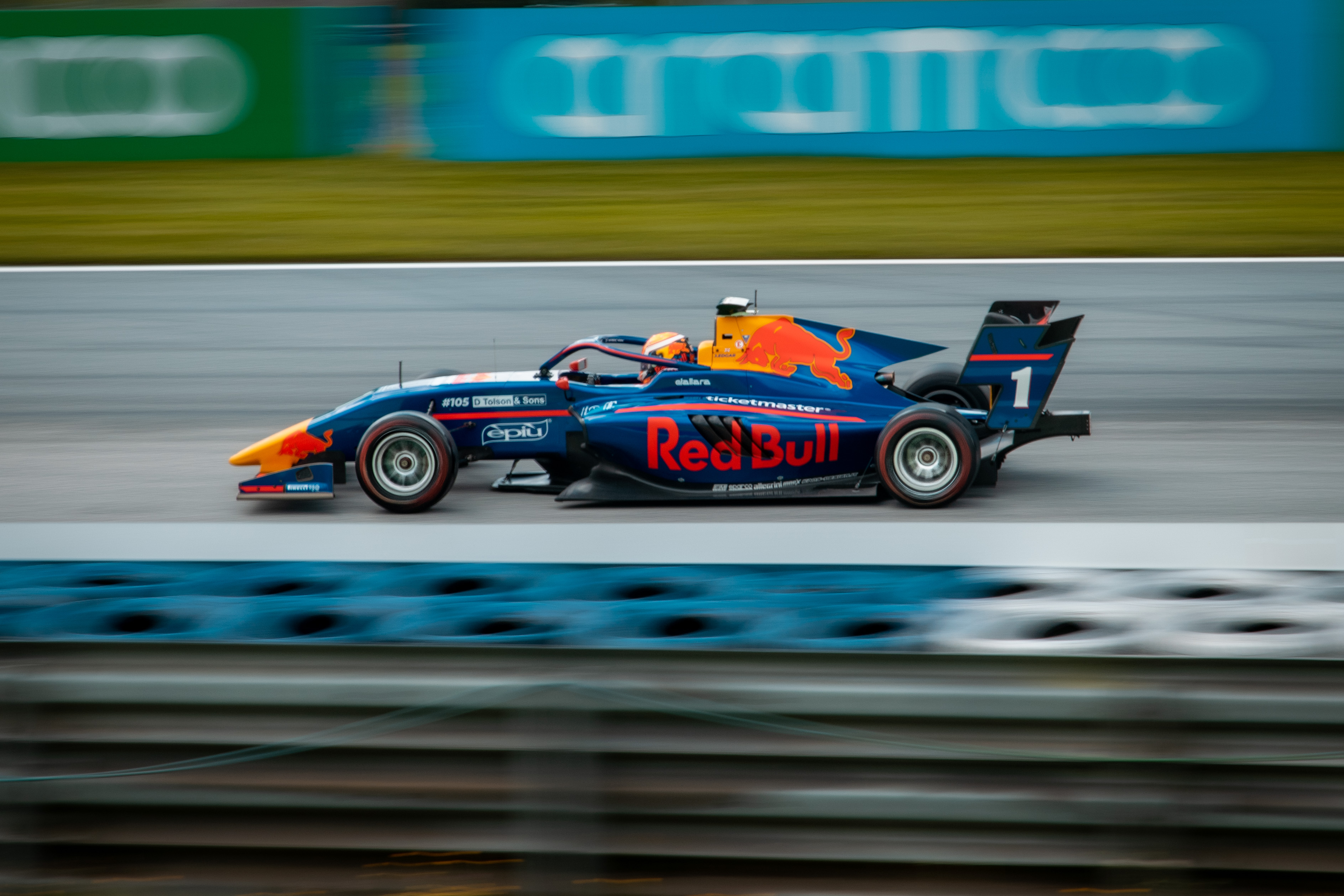
Edgar driving for Trident during the 2022 Spielberg Formula 3 round.

In October 2020, Edgar completed the first post-season test at Catalunya, running for MP Motorsport. Later that month, the Dutch outfit once again fielded Edgar in the second post-season test at Jerez. In December, Edgar partook in a test with the Carlin team at Algarve. At the start of January, Edgar was announced to drive for Carlin in the 2021 season, partnering Ido Cohen and Kaylen Frederick. He qualified 12th and thus started on pole on his debut as a result of reverse grid, and finishing that race in fifth place gave him his first points in Formula 3. Edgar's most successful round came at the Red Bull Ring where he, after only qualifying in 18th place, finished sixth, fifth and tenth in the races respectively. Unfortunately, Edgar didn't manage to score any further points after that round and ended up 18th in the standings, having scored all but two points of Carlin that year. However, in September 2021, Edgar was nominated for the Autosport BRDC Award and was selected as one of the four finalists together with Louis Foster, Oliver Bearman and eventual winner Zak O'Sullivan.

==== 2022 ====
In November 2021, Edgar switched to reigning team champions Trident for the post-season test at Catalunya, driving alongside Roman Staněk and rookie Zane Maloney. After further testing during the winter, Edgar was confirmed with the Italian outfit in January for the 2022 season. Having been picked as one of the title favourites, it was a surprise when Edgar finished outside of the top ten in both races of the opening round. However, he later revealed that he had been diagnosed with Crohn's disease, which caused major weight loss during the winter and made driving immensely difficult. Edgar opted to pull out of the championship following that round, claiming that he "[needed] to take some time out to prioritise [his] health. After missing the rounds at Imola and Barcelona, Edgar returned for the fourth round at Silverstone, having "improved sufficiently" to return to racing. In the feature race, he scored his first points of the season with an eighth-place finish. He would continue his points-scoring form into the following round in Austria, where he ended up seventh in the sprint race, however a collision caused by Caio Collet at the Safety car restart in the feature race prevented another points finish. A scoreless round at Budapest came next, although Edgar would finish off the season in a positive manner, scoring points in all of the remaining six races, being the only driver to manage this feat. Edgar ended up twelfth in the standings, having helped Trident to the runner-up spot in the teams' championship and become the highest placed driver to have missed at least two rounds.

After the end of the season, Edgar took part in the post-season test, partnering Franco Colapinto and Mari Boya at MP Motorsport.

==== 2023 ====
Edgar remained in Formula 3 for the 2023 season, this time moving to MP Motorsport after a successful test. However, much as the Briton had hoped to start the season off strongly, he was only able to collect two points during the first four rounds of 2023. Despite persistent qualifying struggles, Edgar would eventually return to the top-ten, finishing fifth and sixth in Austria. More top-ten finishes came in the subsequent two events, with a highlight being fourth during the Spa sprint race, before Edgar managed to take his maiden victory in the category at Monza, managing to stay in the lead even after a last-lap safety car restart. He finished the year in 13th position overall, being beaten by teammate Colapinto, who ended up fourth.

=== Formula One ===
In September 2017, Edgar was named as one of four new signings to the Red Bull Junior Team, alongside Dennis Hauger, Jack Doohan and Harry Thompson. However at the start of 2023, Edgar was announced to be leaving the junior team.

=== Formula E ===
In April 2023, Edgar was invited to take part in the Formula E Berlin rookie test with Envision Racing. He would again partake in the Berlin rookie test the following year, but would be driving for DS Penske.

== Sportscar career ==
=== 2023: First foray ===
At the back end of 2023, Edgar made his sporscar racing debut in the British GT Championship, driving a McLaren 720S GT3 Evo for Garage 59 at the season finale in Donington.

=== 2024: ELMS LMP2 title ===
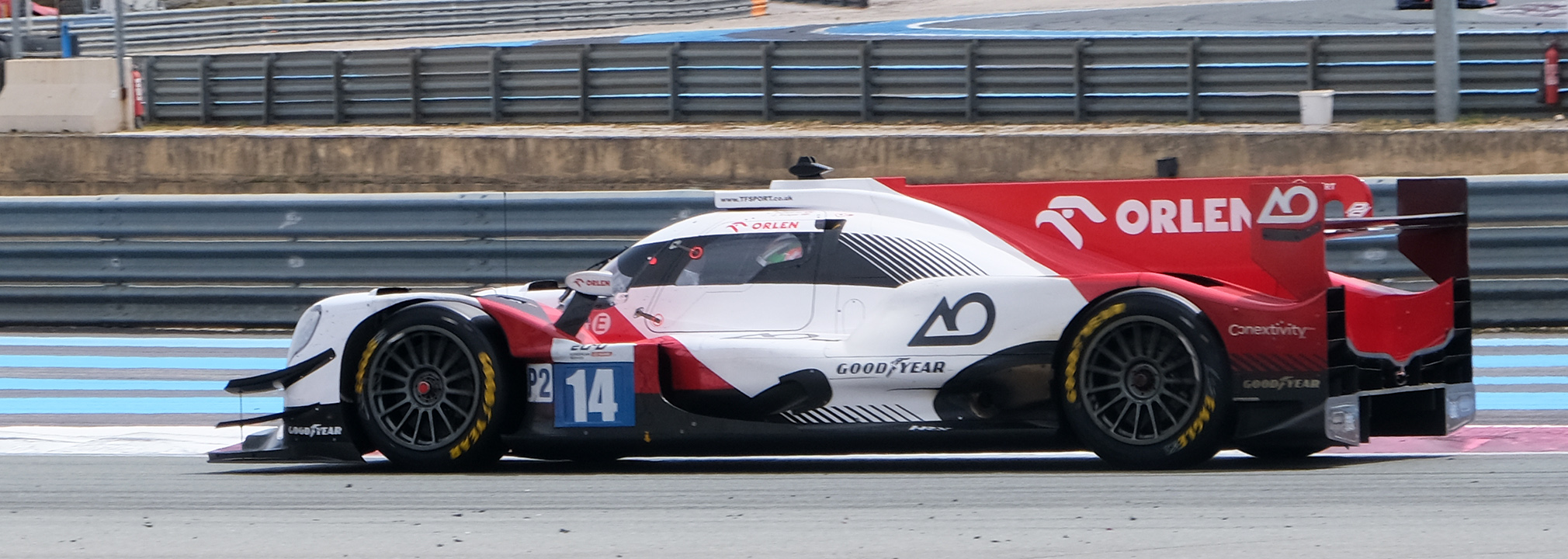
The #14 Oreca 07 from AO by TF at the 2024 4 Hours of Le Castellet driven by Edgar, Louis Delétraz and Robert Kubica

Edgar switched into endurance racing on a full-time basis for 2024, driving in the 24 Hours of Daytona as part of the Sean Creech Motorsport lineup in the LMP2 class. He also drove at Sebring and Watkins Glen as part of the IMSA SportsCar Championship, receiving particular plaudits for finishing fourth in the former, piloting a Ligier JS P217 chassis as opposed to the Oreca 07 used by the rest of the field.

For his main campaign, Edgar partnered Robert Kubica and Louis Delétraz at AO by TF in the European Le Mans Series. Following a seventh place in class at Barcelona, Edgar took the lead during the opening stint at Le Castellet, which helped his team to finish third overall. At the following race in Imola, the Briton put in a strong pair of opening stints in a contest which saw the No. 14 inherit victory after its conclusion, when the Panis Racing entry was penalised for a FCY infringement, thus earning Edgar his first win in sportscar racing. Following an appeal by Panis, the penalty was rescinded, leaving Edgar and his teammates in second. He did not have to wait long for his true first victory, as AO claimed a win from pole at Spa-Francorchamps. Fifth at Mugello set up a title decider at Portimão, where an erroneously applied penalty for the title rivals at Inter Europol Competition helped AO on their way to second in the race, a result that secured the title for Edgar, Delétraz, and Kubica. At the end of 2024, Edgar was named Dailysportscar's "Rising Star of the Year" over the likes of Esteban Masson and Alex Quinn.

=== 2025–26: LMP2 and GT split, Le Mans class win and WEC title ===
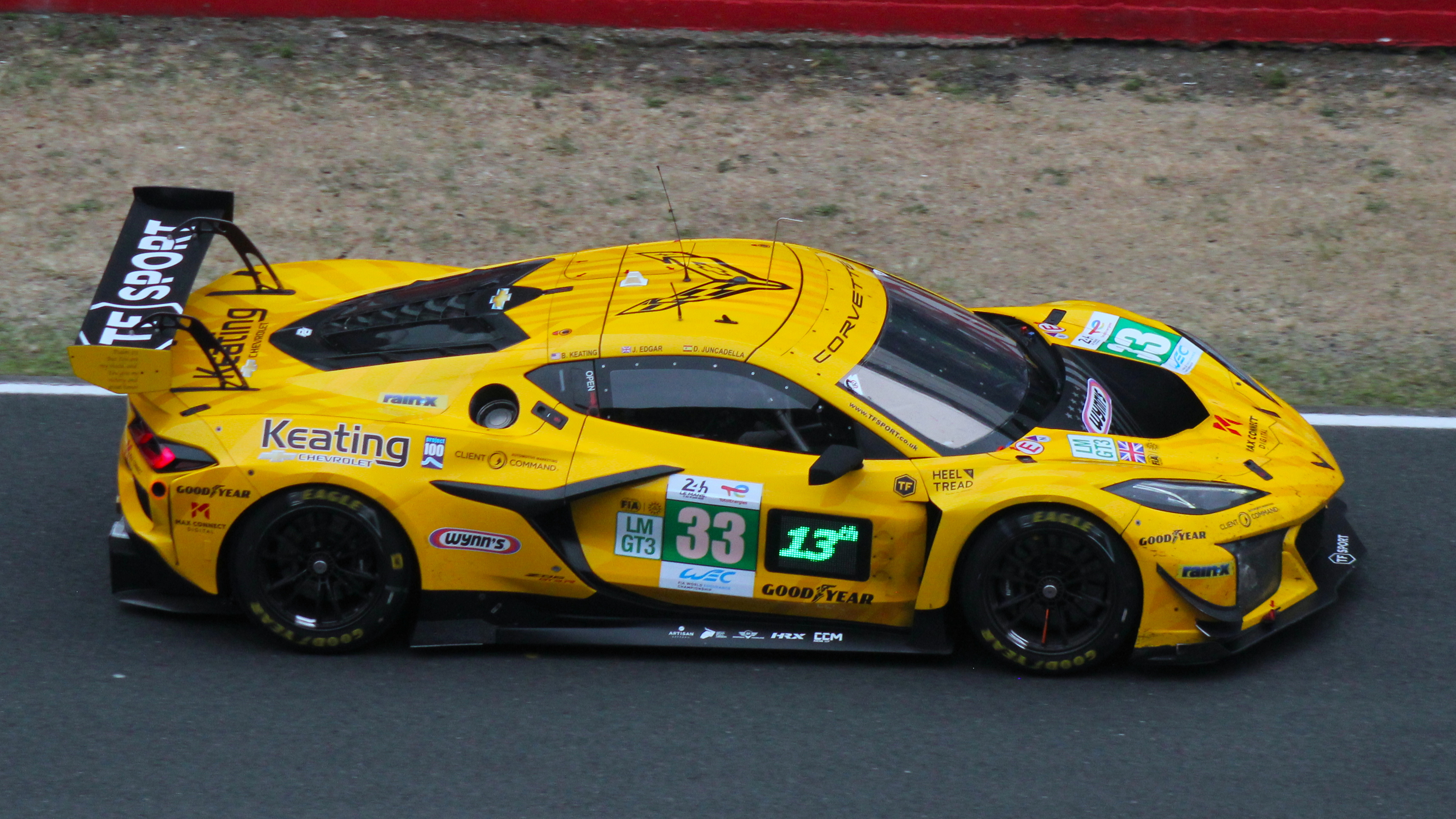
Edgar's No. 33 car at the 2025 24 Hours of Le Mans

Extending his relationship with TF Sport and AO Racing, Edgar became a full-time driver in the LMGT3 category of the FIA World Endurance Championship, driving a Chevrolet Corvette Z06 GT3.R alongside factory driver Daniel Juncadella and bronze-ranked Ben Keating. Additionally, he became AO's silver driver for the endurance rounds of the IMSA SCC, partnering Dane Cameron and P. J. Hyett. His WEC season started perfectly in Qatar, as a clean race and an accomplished defense by Juncadella on Grégoire Saucy in the final hour earned Edgar his maiden GT victory. Just over a month later, Edgar took part in a one-off IMSA GTD class entry for AO Racing at Long Beach alongside Laurens Vanthoor. Edgar qualified second and, helped by the strategy of staying on the older tyres at the sole pit stop, enabled Vanthoor to take the lead and win. The WEC campaign from that point onward proved challenging, as Edgar and his teammates never finished better than sixth across the remaining seven races, leading to them placing sixth in the championship — narrowly behind the sister car. In IMSA, Edgar helped full-time drivers Dane Cameron and P. J. Hyett to win the LMP2 title; a highlight proved to be second place at Watkins Glen.

For the 2026 season, Edgar remained with TF Sport in the WEC and AO Racing in the endurance rounds in IMSA. At the WEC season opener in Imola, Edgar fought for the lead with Tom Fleming but was eventually forced to concede, though the No. 33 crew still managed to take second place. They finished eighth at Spa. At the 2026 24 Hours of Le Mans, the No. 33 took control of the race's second half after its bronze, Ben Keating, had completed his minimum drive time in the first eight hours of the race. Edgar became the 33's "man of the match" (according to Nicky Catsburg, the team's pro driver) in the final hours by driving the final five stints of the race, allowing the team to celebrate victory at the end. The team, which saw regular Catsburg be substituted by Nicolás Varrone due to IMSA commitments, finished eighth at São Paulo, before placing 12th at Austin following contact for Keating. Fifth place at Fuji allowed Edgar to go into the final two rounds with a 24-point lead at the top of the standings, one that shrank to 18 at Barcelona after Edgar was penalised for causing an incident; the No. 33 finished seventh. Having qualified second for the Monza season finale, Edgar and his teammates finished third, allowing Edgar to win the LMGT3 title as a solo driver. At the end of the season, Edgar was named a Corvette factory driver for the 2027 season.

== Driver profile ==
Edgar has been praised for his strategic thinking by 2026 WEC teammate Nicky Catsburg, who described how Edgar discussed the optimal race strategy with his engineers during his stints. After winning the LMGT3 class at the 2026 24 Hours of Le Mans, Catsburg compared Edgar to Kimi Räikkönen, highlighting his intelligence and calmness under pressure.

== Personal life ==
Edgar is the cousin of racing driver Jessica Edgar. They are part of the fourth generation of Edgars to race professionally. In 2022, Edgar was diagnosed with Crohn's disease, as a result of which he had lost 17 kilogrammes ahead of the 2022 season.

== Karting record ==
=== Karting career summary ===
Season	Series	Team	Position
2012	Kartmasters British Grand Prix — Comer Cadet	Fusion Motorsport	14th
2012	Super 1 National Championship — Comer Cadet	Fusion Motorsport	20th
2013	LGM Series — IAME Cadet	Fusion Motorsport	11th
2013	Kartmasters British Grand Prix — IAME Cadet	Fusion Motorsport	10th
2013	Super 1 National Championship — Comer Cadet	Fusion Motorsport	4th
2013	Super One Series Championship — IAME Cadet	Fusion Motorsport	NC
2013	O Plate — Comer Cadet	Fusion Motorsport	**1st**
2014	LGM Series — IAME Cadet	Fusion Motorsport	14th
2014	Kartmasters British Grand Prix — IAME Cadet	Fusion Motorsport	4th
2014	Super 1 National Championship — IAME Cadet	Fusion Motorsport	**3rd**
2014	O Plate — IAME Cadet	Fusion Motorsport	**1st**
2015	Florida Winter Tour — Mini ROK	Team Benik Kart	**1st**
2015	Kartmasters British Grand Prix — IAME Cadet	Fusion Motorsport	7th
2015	SKUSA Pro Tour — TaG Cadet	Fusion Motorsport	**2nd**
2015	LGM Series — IAME Cadet	Fusion Motorsport	**1st**
2015	Super 1 National Championship — IAME Cadet	Fusion Motorsport	**2nd**
2015	O Plate — IAME Cadet	Fusion Motorsport	**1st**
2015	SKUSA SuperNationals — TaG Cadet	Team Benik Kart	**1st**
2015	WSK Final Cup — 60 Mini	Team Benik Kart	25th
2016	Kartmasters British Grand Prix — Rotax Mini Max	Coles Racing	6th
2016	British Open Championship — Rotax Mini Max	Coles Racing	**2nd**
2016	Super 1 National Championship — Rotax Mini Max	Coles Racing	**2nd**
2016	Rotax Max Challenge Grand Finals — Mini Max	Team Benik Kart	17th
2016	SKUSA SuperNationals — X30 Junior	Team Benik Kart	21st
2017	WSK Champions Cup — OKJ	Forza Racing	21st
2017	South Garda Winter Cup — OKJ	Forza Racing	4th
2017	WSK Super Master Series — OKJ	Forza Racing	12th
2017	Swedish Championship — OKJ	Forza Racing	**1st**
2017	CIK-FIA European Championship — OKJ	Forza Racing	**1st**
2017	CIK-FIA World Championship — OKJ	Forza Racing	34th
2017	WSK Final Cup — OKJ	Forza Racing	4th
2018	WSK Champions Cup — OK	Forza Racing	5th
2018	South Garda Winter Cup — OK	Forza Racing	8th
2018	WSK Super Master Series — OK	Forza Racing	**3rd**
2018	WSK Open Cup — OK	Forza Racing	6th
2018	CIK-FIA European Championship — OK	Forza Racing	31st
2018	CIK-FIA World Championship — OK	Forza Racing	14th

=== Complete CIK-FIA Karting European Championship results ===
(key) (Races in bold indicate pole position) (Races in italics indicate fastest lap)

Year	Team	Class	1	2	3	4	5	6	7	8	9	10	DC	Points
2017	Forza Racing	OKJ	SAR; QH; 2	SAR; R 1	CAY; QH; 17	CAY; R (14)	LEM; QH; 2	LEM; R 3	ALA; QH; 3	ALA; R 1	KRI; QH; 3	KRI; R 4	1st	113
2018	Forza Racing	OK	SAR; QH; 28	SAR; R 24	PFI; QH; 26	PFI; R 24	AMP; QH; 20	AMP; R 16	AUB; QH; 15	AUB; R 13			31st	3

=== Complete Karting World Championship results ===
Year	Team	Class	Quali Heats	Main race
2017	(United Kingdom) Forza Racing	OKJ	26th	**NR**
2018	(United Kingdom) Forza Racing	OK	23rd	**14th**

== Racing record ==
=== Racing career summary ===
Season	Series	Team	Races	Wins	Poles	F/Laps	Podiums	Points	Position
2019	Italian F4 Championship	Jenzer Motorsport	21	0	2	2	2	97	10th
2019	ADAC Formula 4 Championship	Jenzer Motorsport	6	0	0	0	0	0	NC†
2019	F4 Spanish Championship	Jenzer Motorsport	3	0	2	0	3	39	14th
2020	ADAC Formula 4 Championship	Van Amersfoort Racing	21	6	5	6	11	300	**1st**
2020	Italian F4 Championship	Van Amersfoort Racing	14	2	1	3	6	169	4th
2021	FIA Formula 3 Championship	Carlin Buzz Racing	20	0	0	0	0	23	18th
2022	FIA Formula 3 Championship	Trident	14	0	0	2	0	46	12th
2023	FIA Formula 3 Championship	MP Motorsport	18	1	0	0	1	55	13th
2023	British GT Championship - GT3	Garage 59	1	0	0	0	0	0	NC
2024	European Le Mans Series - LMP2	Orlen Team AO by TF	6	1	0	0	4	93	**1st**
2024	IMSA SportsCar Championship - LMP2	Sean Creech Motorsport	3	0	0	0	0	755	30th
2025	FIA World Endurance Championship - LMGT3	TF Sport	8	1	0	0	1	78	6th
2025	24 Hours of Le Mans - LMGT3	TF Sport	1	0	0	0	0	—N/a	7th
2025	IMSA SportsCar Championship - LMP2	AO Racing	5	0	0	0	1	1484	22nd
2025	IMSA SportsCar Championship - GTD	AO Racing	1	1	0	0	1	382	52nd
2025	Belcar Endurance Championship - GT Cup	VR Racing by NGT	1	0	0	0	0	0	NC†
2026	IMSA SportsCar Championship - LMP2	AO Racing	5	1	0	0	1	1505	16th
2026	FIA World Endurance Championship - LMGT3	TF Sport	8	1	0	1	3	107	**1st**
2026	24 Hours of Le Mans - LMGT3	TF Sport	1	0	0	0	1	—N/a	**1st**
2026	European Le Mans Series - LMP2 Pro-Am	AO by TF	1	0	0	0	1	19	13th
2026	Belcar Endurance Championship - GT Cup	NGT Racing	1	1	0	0	1	0	NC†
2026–27	Asian Le Mans Series - GT3	Car Blanche by RSL							

^{†} As Edgar was a guest driver, he was ineligible to score points.
^{*} Season still in progress.

=== Complete Italian F4 Championship results ===
(key) (Races in bold indicate pole position) (Races in italics indicate fastest lap)

Year	Team	1	2	3	4	5	6	7	8	9	10	11	12	13	14	15	16	17	18	19	20	21	22	Pos	Points
2019	Jenzer Motorsport	VLL; 1; 7	VLL; 2; 19	VLL; 3 Ret	MIS; 1; 19	MIS; 2; 10	MIS; 3 C	HUN; 1; 21	HUN; 2; 5	HUN; 3; 7	RBR; 1; 9	RBR; 2; 7	RBR; 3; 14	IMO; 1; 2	IMO; 2; 5	IMO; 3; 5	IMO; 4; 9	MUG; 1; 3	MUG; 2; 8	MUG; 3; 10	MNZ; 1 Ret	**MNZ**; **2**; 8	**MNZ**; **3**; 9	10th	97
2020	Van Amersfoort Racing	MIS; 1	MIS; 2	MIS; 3	IMO1; 1; 2	**IMO1**; **2**; 1	IMO1; 3; 3	RBR; 1; 3	RBR; 2; 4	RBR; 3; 4	MUG; 1 Ret	MUG; 2; 5	MUG; 3; 26	MNZ; 1	MNZ; 2	MNZ; 3	IMO2; 1; 5	IMO2; 2; 11	IMO2; 3; 4	VLL; 1; 3	VLL; 2 C	VLL; 3; 1		4th	169

=== Complete ADAC Formula 4 Championship results ===
(key) (Races in bold indicate pole position) (Races in italics indicate fastest lap)

Year	Team	1	2	3	4	5	6	7	8	9	10	11	12	13	14	15	16	17	18	19	20	21	Pos	Points
2019	Jenzer Motorsport	OSC; 1	OSC; 2	OSC; 3	RBR; 1; 14	RBR; 2 Ret	RBR; 3; 11	HOC; 1; 9	HOC; 2; 13	ZAN; 1	ZAN; 2	ZAN; 3	NÜR; 1	NÜR; 2	NÜR; 3	HOC; 1	HOC; 2	HOC; 3	SAC; 1	SAC; 2	SAC; 3		NC†	0
2020	Van Amersfoort Racing	LAU1; 1; 1	LAU1; 2; 1	LAU1; 3; 7	NÜR1; 1; 2	**NÜR1**; **2**; 1	NÜR1; 3; 5	HOC; 1; 3	HOC; 2; 4	HOC; 3; 17	NÜR2; 1; 3	**NÜR2**; **2**; 1	NÜR2; 3; 6	**RBR**; **1**; 1	**RBR**; **2**; 1	RBR; 3; 7	LAU2; 1; 7	LAU2; 2; 7	LAU2; 3; 4	**OSC**; **1**; 12	OSC; 2; 2	OSC; 3; 2	1st	300

^{†} As Edgar was a guest driver, he was ineligible to score points.

=== Complete F4 Spanish Championship results ===
(key) (Races in bold indicate pole position) (Races in italics indicate fastest lap)

Year	Team	1	2	3	4	5	6	7	8	9	10	11	12	13	14	15	16	17	18	19	20	21	Pos	Points
2019	Jenzer Motorsport	NAV; 1	NAV; 2	NAV; 3	LEC; 1; 2	**LEC**; **2**; 2	**LEC**; **3**; 3	ARA; 1	ARA; 2	ARA; 3	CRT; 1	CRT; 2	CRT; 3	JER; 1	JER; 2	JER; 3	ALG; 1	ALG; 2	ALG; 3	CAT; 1	CAT; 2	CAT; 3	14th	39

=== Complete FIA Formula 3 Championship results ===
(key) (Races in bold indicate pole position; races in italics indicate points for the fastest lap of top ten finishers)

Year	Entrant	1	2	3	4	5	6	7	8	9	10	11	12	13	14	15	16	17	18	19	20	21	DC	Points
2021	Carlin Buzz Racing	CAT; 1; 5	CAT; 2; 6	CAT; 3; 16	LEC; 1; 28	LEC; 2; 23	LEC; 3; 14	RBR; 1; 6	RBR; 2; 5	RBR; 3; 10	HUN; 1 Ret	HUN; 2; 26	HUN; 3 Ret	SPA; 1; 21	SPA; 2; 17	SPA; 3; 19	ZAN; 1; 19	ZAN; 2; 25	ZAN; 3; 15	SOC; 1; 18	SOC; 2 C	SOC; 3; 14	18th	23
2022	Trident	BHR; SPR; 13	BHR; FEA; 11	IMO; SPR	IMO; FEA	CAT; SPR	CAT; FEA	SIL; SPR; 15	SIL; FEA; 8	RBR; SPR; 7	RBR; FEA; 21	HUN; SPR; 13	HUN; FEA; 24	SPA; SPR; 4	SPA; FEA; 5	ZAN; SPR; 4	ZAN; FEA; 9	MNZ; SPR; 5	MNZ; FEA; 8				12th	46
2023	MP Motorsport	BHR; SPR; 9	BHR; FEA; 23	MEL; SPR; DSQ	MEL; FEA; 11	MON; SPR; Ret	MON; FEA; 14	CAT; SPR; 12	CAT; FEA; 15	RBR; SPR; 5	RBR; FEA; 6	SIL; SPR; 28	SIL; FEA; NC	HUN; SPR; 8	HUN; FEA; 8	SPA; SPR; 4	SPA; FEA; 19	MNZ; SPR; Ret	MNZ; FEA; 1				13th	55

=== Complete British GT Championship results ===
(key) (Races in bold indicate pole position; races in italics indicate fastest lap)

Year	Team	Car	Class	1	2	3	4	5	6	7	8	9	DC	Points
2023	Garage 59	McLaren 720S GT3 Evo	GT3	OUL; 1	OUL; 2	SIL; 1	DON; 1	SNE; 1	SNE; 2	ALG; 1	BRH; 1	DON; 1; 13	NC	0

=== Complete IMSA SportsCar Championship results ===
(key) (Races in bold indicate pole position; results in italics indicate fastest lap)

Year	Team	Class	Make	Engine	1	2	3	4	5	6	7	8	9	10	Rank	Points
2024	Sean Creech Motorsport	LMP2	Ligier JS P217	Gibson GK428 4.2 L V8	DAY; 9	SEB; 4	WGL; 11	MOS	ELK	IMS	PET				30th	755
2025	AO Racing	LMP2	Oreca 07	Gibson GK428 4.2 L V8	DAY; 5	SEB; 6			WGL; 2	MOS	ELK		IMS; 5	PET; 6	22nd	1484
2025	AO Racing	GTD	Porsche 911 GT3 R (992)	Porsche M97/80 4.2 L Flat-6			LBH; 1	LGA				VIR			52nd	382
2026	AO Racing	LMP2	Oreca 07	Gibson GK428 4.2 L V8	DAY; 5	SEB; 6	WGL; 1	MOS	ELK; 4	IMS	**PET**; 10				16th	1505

=== Complete European Le Mans Series results ===
(key) (Races in bold indicate pole position; results in italics indicate fastest lap)

Year	Entrant	Class	Chassis	Engine	1	2	3	4	5	6	Rank	Points
2024	Orlen Team AO by TF	LMP2	Oreca 07	Gibson GK428 4.2 L V8	CAT; 7	LEC; 3	IMO; 2	**SPA**; 1	MUG; 5	ALG; 2	1st	93
2026	AO by TF	LMP2 Pro-Am	Oreca 07	Gibson GK428 4.2 L V8	CAT	**LEC**; 2	IMO	SPA	SIL	ALG	13th	19

=== Complete FIA World Endurance Championship results ===
(key) (Races in bold indicate pole position; races in italics indicate fastest lap)

Year	Entrant	Class	Car	Engine	1	2	3	4	5	6	7	8	Rank	Points
2025	TF Sport	LMGT3	Chevrolet Corvette Z06 GT3.R	Chevrolet LT6.R 5.5 L V8	QAT; 1	IMO; 7	SPA; 13	LMS; 6	SÃO; 7	COA; Ret	FUJ; 11	BHR; 6	6th	78
2026	TF Sport	LMGT3	Chevrolet Corvette Z06 GT3.R	Chevrolet LT6.R 5.5 L V8	IMO; 2	SPA; 8	LMS; 1	SÃO; 8	COA; 12	FUJ; 5	CAT; 7	MNZ; 3	1st	107

=== Complete 24 Hours of Le Mans results ===
Year	Team	Co-Drivers	Car	Class	Laps	Pos.	Class Pos.
2025	(United Kingdom) TF Sport	(Spain) Daniel Juncadella (United States) Ben Keating	Chevrolet Corvette Z06 GT3.R	LMGT3	339	39th	7th
2026	(United Kingdom) TF Sport	(Netherlands) Nicky Catsburg (United States) Ben Keating	Chevrolet Corvette Z06 GT3.R	LMGT3	336	33rd	**1st**

Sporting positions
Preceded by Théo Pourchaire	ADAC Formula 4 Champion; 2020	Succeeded by Ollie Bearman
Preceded by Alex Lynn; Kyffin Simpson; James Allen	European Le Mans Series; LMP2 Champion; 2024; With: Robert Kubica & Louis Delétraz	Succeeded by Oliver Gray; Esteban Masson; Charles Milesi
Preceded by Richard Lietz; Riccardo Pera; Ryan Hardwick	FIA Endurance Trophy for LMGT3 Drivers; Champion; 2026	Succeeded by Incumbent
