= 2021 Zandvoort Formula 3 round =

6th round of the 2021 FIA F3 Championship

(Netherlands) 2021 Zandvoort Formula 3 round
Round details
- Round 6 of 7 in the 2021 FIA Formula 3 Championship.
- Location: Circuit Zandvoort, Zandvoort, Netherlands
- Course: Permanent Circuit; 4.307 km (2.676 mi)

Sprint race 1
- Date: 4 September 2021
- Laps: 24
Podium
First	(Monaco) Arthur Leclerc	Prema Racing
Second	(United States) Logan Sargeant	Charouz Racing System
Third	(Japan) Ayumu Iwasa	Hitech Grand Prix
Fastest lap
Driver	(Russia) Aleksandr Smolyar	ART Grand Prix
- Time: 1:26.573 (on lap 13)

Sprint race 2
- Date: 4 September 2021
- Laps: 24
Podium
First	(France) Victor Martins	MP Motorsport
Second	(France) Clément Novalak	Trident
Third	(Denmark) Frederik Vesti	ART Grand Prix
Fastest lap
Driver	(France) Victor Martins	MP Motorsport
- Time: 1:26.857 (on lap 14)

Feature race
- Date: 5 September 2021
- Laps: 24
Pole position
Driver	(Norway) Dennis Hauger	Prema Racing
Time	1:24.580	
Podium
First	(Norway) Dennis Hauger	Prema Racing
Second	(France) Clément Novalak	Trident
Third	(Russia) Aleksandr Smolyar	ART Grand Prix
Fastest lap
Driver	(Norway) Dennis Hauger	Prema Racing
- Time: 1:26.476 (on lap 2)

The 2021 Zandvoort Formula 3 round was the penultimate race of the 2021 FIA Formula 3 Championship. It took place at the Circuit Zandvoort and featured three races on 4 September and 5 September in support of the 2021 Dutch Grand Prix.

== Classification ==
=== Qualifying ===
Pos.	No.	Driver	Team	Time/Gap	Grid
1	1	(Norway) Dennis Hauger	Prema Racing	1:24.580	1
2	6	(Germany) David Schumacher	Trident	+0.135	2
3	17	(France) Victor Martins	MP Motorsport	+0.305	3
4	4	(Australia) Jack Doohan	Trident	+0.359	4
5	5	(France) Clément Novalak	Trident	+0.381	5
6	18	(Brazil) Caio Collet	MP Motorsport	+0.451	6
7	10	(United States) Jak Crawford	Hitech Grand Prix	+0.694	7
8	8	(Russia) Aleksandr Smolyar	ART Grand Prix	+0.765	8
9	11	(Japan) Ayumu Iwasa	Hitech Grand Prix	+0.823	9
10	2	(Monaco) Arthur Leclerc	Prema Racing	+0.842	10
11	29	(United States) Logan Sargeant	Charouz Racing System	+0.976	11
12	22	(Belgium) Amaury Cordeel	Campos Racing	+0.987	12
13	16	(Mexico) Rafael Villagómez	HWA Racelab	+0.994	PL^{1}
14	7	(Denmark) Frederik Vesti	ART Grand Prix	+1.032	13
15	21	(Italy) Lorenzo Colombo	Campos Racing	+1.032	14
16	3	(United Kingdom) Olli Caldwell	Prema Racing	+1.172	15
17	23	(Israel) Ido Cohen	Carlin Buzz Racing	+1.172	16
18	15	(Denmark) Oliver Rasmussen	HWA Racelab	+1.206	17
19	25	(United Kingdom) Jonny Edgar	Carlin Buzz Racing	+1.219	18
20	12	(Czech Republic) Roman Staněk	Hitech Grand Prix	+1.306	19
21	26	(Australia) Calan Williams	Jenzer Motorsport	+1.312	20
22	28	(Romania) Filip Ugran	Jenzer Motorsport	+1.467	21
23	27	(United Kingdom) Johnathan Hoggard	Jenzer Motorsport	+1.497	22
24	14	(Italy) Matteo Nannini	HWA Racelab	+1.577	23
25	19	(Netherlands) Tijmen van der Helm	MP Motorsport	+1.681	24
26	24	(United States) Kaylen Frederick	Carlin Buzz Racing	+1.712	25
27	9	(United States) Juan Manuel Correa	ART Grand Prix	+1.829	26
28	20	(Hungary) László Tóth	Campos Racing	+2.058	27
29	30	(United States) Hunter Yeany	Charouz Racing System	+2.927	28
30	31	(Portugal) Zdeněk Chovanec	Charouz Racing System	+3.146	29

Notes

- ^1 – Rafael Villagómez was forced to start from the pit lane in races one and three after missing the weighbridge in qualifying.

=== Sprint Race 1 ===
Pos.	No.	Driver	Team	Laps	Time/Gap	Grid	Pts.
1	2	(Monaco) Arthur Leclerc	Prema Racing	24	39:02.034	3	15
2	29	(United States) Logan Sargeant	Charouz Racing System	24	+0.945	2	12
3	11	(Japan) Ayumu Iwasa	Hitech Grand Prix	24	+1.555	4	10
4	10	(United States) Jak Crawford	Hitech Grand Prix	24	+2.479	6	8
5	18	(Brazil) Caio Collet	MP Motorsport	24	+2.789	7	6
6	4	(Australia) Jack Doohan	Trident	24	+3.035	9	5
7	1	(Norway) Dennis Hauger	Prema Racing	24	+3.807	12	4
8	17	(France) Victor Martins	MP Motorsport	24	+4.324	10	3
9	7	(Denmark) Frederik Vesti	ART Grand Prix	24	+7.094	13	2
10	3	(United Kingdom) Olli Caldwell	Prema Racing	24	+7.370	15	1
11	5	(France) Clément Novalak	Trident	24	+8.193	8	
12	23	(Israel) Ido Cohen	Carlin Buzz Racing	24	+8.670	16	
13	21	(Italy) Lorenzo Colombo	Campos Racing	24	+9.172	14	
14	6	(Germany) David Schumacher	Trident	24	+9.715	11	
15	28	(Romania) Filip Ugran	Jenzer Motorsport	24	+10.408	21	
16	26	(Australia) Calan Williams	Jenzer Motorsport	24	+10.566	20	
17	14	(Italy) Matteo Nannini	HWA Racelab	24	+11.331	23	
18	15	(Denmark) Oliver Rasmussen	HWA Racelab	24	+12.948	17	
19	25	(United Kingdom) Jonny Edgar	Carlin Buzz Racing	24	+13.031	18	
20	24	(United States) Kaylen Frederick	Carlin Buzz Racing	24	+13.373	29^{1}	
21	19	(Netherlands) Tijmen van der Helm	MP Motorsport	24	+14.001	24	
22	16	(Mexico) Rafael Villagómez	HWA Racelab	24	+14.527	PL	
23	22	(Belgium) Amaury Cordeel	Campos Racing	24	+15.403	1	
24	8	(Russia) Aleksandr Smolyar	ART Grand Prix	24	+15.633	5	
25	20	(Hungary) László Tóth	Campos Racing	24	+17.072	26	
26	31	(Portugal) Zdeněk Chovanec	Charouz Racing System	24	+18.820	28	
27	12	(Czech Republic) Roman Staněk	Hitech Grand Prix	24	+18.993	19	
28	9	(United States) Juan Manuel Correa	ART Grand Prix	24	+58.066	25	
DNF	30	(United States) Hunter Yeany	Charouz Racing System	16	Collision	27	
DNF	27	(United Kingdom) Johnathan Hoggard	Jenzer Motorsport	16	Collision	22	
Fastest lap set by (Russia) Aleksandr Smolyar: 1:26.573 (lap 13)

Notes

- ^1 – Kaylen Frederick received a grid penalty due to causing a collision with Juan Manuel Correa at the Red Bull Ring.

=== Sprint Race 2 ===
Pos.	No.	Driver	Team	Laps	Time/Gap	Grid	Pts.
1	17	(France) Victor Martins	MP Motorsport	24	38:43.058	5	15 (2)
2	5	(France) Clément Novalak	Trident	24	+0.396	2	12
3	7	(Denmark) Frederik Vesti	ART Grand Prix	24	+2.025	4	10
4	18	(Brazil) Caio Collet	MP Motorsport	24	+2.408	8	8
5	6	(Germany) David Schumacher	Trident	24	+3.897	14	6
6	3	(United Kingdom) Olli Caldwell	Prema Racing	24	+5.102	3	5
7	2	(Monaco) Arthur Leclerc	Prema Racing	24	+5.537	12	4
8	10	(United States) Jak Crawford	Hitech Grand Prix	24	+6.765	9	3
9	14	(Italy) Matteo Nannini	HWA Racelab	24	+7.223	17	2
10	29	(United States) Logan Sargeant	Charouz Racing System	24	+7.790	11	1
11	24	(United States) Kaylen Frederick	Carlin Buzz Racing	24	+8.353	20	
12	15	(Denmark) Oliver Rasmussen	HWA Racelab	24	+10.184	18	
13	16	(Mexico) Rafael Villagómez	HWA Racelab	24	+10.936	22	
14	8	(Russia) Aleksandr Smolyar	ART Grand Prix	24	+10.992	24	
15	12	(Czech Republic) Roman Staněk	Hitech Grand Prix	24	+11.672	27	
16	20	(Hungary) László Tóth	Campos Racing	24	+12.071	25	
17	9	(United States) Juan Manuel Correa	ART Grand Prix	24	+12.491	28	
18	4	(Australia) Jack Doohan	Trident	24	+13.146	7	
19	27	(United Kingdom) Johnathan Hoggard	Jenzer Motorsport	24	+13.312	30	
20	31	(Portugal) Zdeněk Chovanec	Charouz Racing System	24	+13.622	26	
21	19	(Netherlands) Tijmen van der Helm	MP Motorsport	24	+13.977	21	
22	26	(Australia) Calan Williams	Jenzer Motorsport	24	+14.041	16	
23	30	(United States) Hunter Yeany	Charouz Racing System	24	+14.885	29	
24	28	(Romania) Filip Ugran	Jenzer Motorsport	24	+20.117^{1}	15	
25	25	(United Kingdom) Jonny Edgar	Carlin Buzz Racing	24	+22.135	19	
DNF	23	(Israel) Ido Cohen	Carlin Buzz Racing	23	Collision damage	1	
DNF	1	(Norway) Dennis Hauger	Prema Racing	23	Collision damage	6	
DNF	22	(Belgium) Amaury Cordeel	Campos Racing	19	Accident	23	
DNF	11	(Japan) Ayumu Iwasa	Hitech Grand Prix	8	Damage	10	
DNF	21	(Italy) Lorenzo Colombo	Campos Racing	2	Collision	13	
Fastest lap set by (France) Victor Martins: 1:26.857 (lap 14)

Notes

- ^1 – Filip Ugran originally finished 12th, but received a ten-second time penalty for a collision with Jonny Edgar.

=== Feature Race ===
Pos.	No.	Driver	Team	Laps	Time/Gap	Grid	Pts.
1	1	(Norway) Dennis Hauger	Prema Racing	24	35:47.901	1	25 (4+2)
2	5	(France) Clément Novalak	Trident	24	+5.387	5	18
3	8	(Russia) Aleksandr Smolyar	ART Grand Prix	24	+6.961	8	15
4	4	(Australia) Jack Doohan	Trident	24	+7.184	4	12
5	18	(Brazil) Caio Collet	MP Motorsport	24	+8.705	6	10
6	29	(United States) Logan Sargeant	Charouz Racing System	24	+12.016	11	8
7	10	(United States) Jak Crawford	Hitech Grand Prix	24	+13.093	7	6
8	7	(Denmark) Frederik Vesti	ART Grand Prix	24	+14.007	13	4
9	2	(Monaco) Arthur Leclerc	Prema Racing	24	+14.643	10	2
10	17	(France) Victor Martins	MP Motorsport	24	+15.805	3	1
11	11	(Japan) Ayumu Iwasa	Hitech Grand Prix	24	+21.738	9	
12	22	(Belgium) Amaury Cordeel	Campos Racing	24	+22.896	12	
13	12	(Czech Republic) Roman Staněk	Hitech Grand Prix	24	+27.284	18	
14	3	(United Kingdom) Olli Caldwell	Prema Racing	24	+27.331	15	
15	25	(United Kingdom) Jonny Edgar	Carlin Buzz Racing	24	+28.350	17	
16	23	(Israel) Ido Cohen	Carlin Buzz Racing	24	+29.809	19^{1}	
17	21	(Italy) Lorenzo Colombo	Campos Racing	24	+30.437	14	
18	26	(Australia) Calan Williams	Jenzer Motorsport	24	+36.957	20	
19	28	(Romania) Filip Ugran	Jenzer Motorsport	24	+39.730	21	
20	27	(United Kingdom) Johnathan Hoggard	Jenzer Motorsport	24	+39.876	22	
21	24	(United States) Kaylen Frederick	Carlin Buzz Racing	24	+48.500	25	
22	30	(United States) Hunter Yeany	Charouz Racing System	24	+49.085	28	
23	31	(Portugal) Zdeněk Chovanec	Charouz Racing System	24	+50.627	29	
24	20	(Hungary) László Tóth	Campos Racing	24	+52.757	27	
25	16	(Mexico) Rafael Villagómez	HWA Racelab	24	+53.010	PL	
26	15	(Denmark) Oliver Rasmussen	HWA Racelab	24	+58.074	16	
27	9	(United States) Juan Manuel Correa	ART Grand Prix	24	+58.318^{2}	26	
28	14	(Italy) Matteo Nannini	HWA Racelab	24	+1:25.810	23	
DNF	19	(Netherlands) Tijmen van der Helm	MP Motorsport	23	Collision	24	
DNF	6	(Germany) David Schumacher	Trident	21	Collision	2	
Fastest lap set by (Norway) Dennis Hauger: 1:26.476 (lap 2)

Notes

- † – Tijmen van der Helm and David Schumacher retired, but were classified as they completed over 90% of the race distance.
- ^1 – Ido Cohen was given a three-place grid drop for causing a collision with Dennis Hauger in race 2.
- ^2 – Juan Manuel Correa was given a ten-second time penalty after the race for causing a collision with Tijmen van der Helm.

== Standings after the event ==
Drivers' Championship standings

	Pos.	Driver	Points
	1	(Norway) Dennis Hauger	193
	2	(Australia) Jack Doohan	150
3	3	(France) Clément Novalak	122
	4	(France) Victor Martins	117
2	5	(Denmark) Frederik Vesti	117

Teams' Championship standings

Pos.	Team	Points
1	(Italy) Prema Racing	352
2	(Italy) Trident	327
3	(France) ART Grand Prix	233
4	(Netherlands) MP Motorsport	204
5	(United Kingdom) Hitech Grand Prix	113

- Note: Only the top five positions are included for both sets of standings.

== See also ==
- 2021 Dutch Grand Prix

Previous round: 2021 Spa-Francorchamps Formula 3 round	FIA Formula 3 Championship; 2021 season	Next round: 2021 Sochi Formula 3 round
Previous round: none	Zandvoort Formula 3 round	Next round: 2022 Zandvoort Formula 3 round
