= 2023 Sakhir Formula 3 round =

First round of the 2023 Formula 3 season

(Bahrain) 2023 Sakhir Formula 3 round
Round details
- Round 1 of 9 in the 2023 FIA Formula 3 Championship.
- Layout of the Bahrain International Circuit
- Location: Bahrain International Circuit; Sakhir, Bahrain
- Course: Permanent racing facility 5.412 km (3.363 mi)

Sprint Race
- Date: 4 March 2023
- Laps: 19
Podium
First	(Spain) Pepe Martí	Campos Racing
Second	(Argentina) Franco Colapinto	MP Motorsport
Third	(Brazil) Caio Collet	Van Amersfoort Racing
Fastest lap
Driver	(Spain) Pepe Martí	Campos Racing
- Time: 1:50.867 (on lap 14)

Feature Race
- Date: 5 March 2023
- Laps: 23
Pole position
Driver	(Italy) Gabriele Minì	Hitech Pulse-Eight
Time	1:47.055	
Podium
First	(Brazil) Gabriel Bortoleto	Trident
Second	(Germany) Oliver Goethe	Trident
Third	(Sweden) Dino Beganovic	Prema Racing
Fastest lap
Driver	(Brazil) Gabriel Bortoleto	Trident
- Time: 1:50.743 (on lap 2)

The 2023 Sakhir FIA Formula 3 round was a motor race held on 4 and 5 March 2023 at the Bahrain International Circuit in Sakhir. It was the opening round of the 2023 FIA Formula 3 Championship, held in support of the 2023 Bahrain Grand Prix.

== Background ==
=== Team changes ===
German Formula 4 team PHM Racing took over the entry and assets of Charouz Racing System at the end of the 2022 season, and runs in cooperation with the Czech squad under the PHM Racing by Charouz moniker.

== Classification ==
=== Qualifying ===
Pos.	No.	Driver	Team	Time/Gap	Grid SR	Grid FR
1	15	(Italy) Gabriele Minì	Hitech Pulse-Eight	1:47.055	12	1
2	5	(Brazil) Gabriel Bortoleto	Trident	+0.057	11	2
3	8	(Switzerland) Grégoire Saucy	ART Grand Prix	+0.111	10	3
4	6	(Germany) Oliver Goethe	Trident	+0.135	9	4
5	25	(Australia) Hugh Barter	Campos Racing	+0.219	8	5
6	7	(United States) Kaylen Frederick	ART Grand Prix	+0.228	7	6
7	4	(Italy) Leonardo Fornaroli	Trident	+0.235	6	7
8	2	(Sweden) Dino Beganovic	Prema Racing	+0.265	5	8
9	1	(Estonia) Paul Aron	Prema Racing	+0.267	4	9
10	17	(Brazil) Caio Collet	Van Amersfoort Racing	+0.316	3	10
11	23	(Spain) Pepe Martí	Campos Racing	+0.336	2	11
12	10	(Argentina) Franco Colapinto	MP Motorsport	+0.343	1	12
13	24	(United Kingdom) Christian Mansell (Note: Mansell is an Australian driver competing under a British licence.)	Campos Racing	+0.396	13	13
14	14	(Colombia) Sebastián Montoya	Hitech Pulse-Eight	+0.421	14	14
15	12	(United Kingdom) Jonny Edgar	MP Motorsport	+0.480	15	15
16	9	(Bulgaria) Nikola Tsolov	ART Grand Prix	+0.538	16	16
17	16	(United Kingdom) Luke Browning	Hitech Pulse-Eight	+0.639	17	17
18	3	(United Kingdom) Zak O'Sullivan	Prema Racing	+0.662	18	18
19	11	(Spain) Mari Boya	MP Motorsport	+0.830	19	19
20	18	(Mexico) Rafael Villagómez	Van Amersfoort Racing	+0.895	20	20
21	20	(United Kingdom) Oliver Gray	Rodin Carlin	+1.145	24^{1}	21
22	26	(Italy) Nikita Bedrin (Note: Bedrin is a Russian driver competing under an Italian licence.)	Jenzer Motorsport	+1.148	21	22
23	31	(Poland) Piotr Wiśnicki	PHM Racing by Charouz	+1.460	22	23
24	29	(Germany) Sophia Flörsch	PHM Racing by Charouz	+1.604	23	24
25	22	(Israel) Ido Cohen	Rodin Carlin	+1.610	25	25
26	21	(United States) Hunter Yeany	Rodin Carlin	+1.630	26	26
27	19	(Australia) Tommy Smith	Van Amersfoort Racing	+1.632	27	27
28	28	(Mexico) Alex García	Jenzer Motorsport	+2.129	28	28
29	30	(Brazil) Roberto Faria	PHM Racing by Charouz	+2.410	29	29
107% time: 1:54.548 (+7.693)
—	27	(United Kingdom) Taylor Barnard	Jenzer Motorsport	+14.138	30	30

Notes

- ^1 – Oliver Gray originally qualified twenty-first, but later received a three-place grid drop for Saturday's Sprint race after he was found to have impeded Roberto Faria at Turn 15.

=== Sprint race ===
Pos.	No.	Driver	Team	Laps	Time/Gap	Grid	Pts.
1	23	(Spain) Pepe Martí	Campos Racing	19	43:15.477	2	10 (1)
2	10	(Argentina) Franco Colapinto	MP Motorsport	19	+1.805	1	9
3	17	(Brazil) Caio Collet	Van Amersfoort Racing	19	+5.879	3	8
4	2	(Sweden) Dino Beganovic	Prema Racing	19	+9.017	5	7
5	1	(Estonia) Paul Aron	Prema Racing	19	+9.848	4	6
6	6	(Germany) Oliver Goethe	Trident	19	+10.623	9	5
7	8	(Switzerland) Grégoire Saucy	ART Grand Prix	19	+11.157	10	4
8	4	(Italy) Leonardo Fornaroli	Trident	19	+11.737	6	3
9	12	(United Kingdom) Jonny Edgar	MP Motorsport	19	+12.359	15	2
10	14	(Colombia) Sebastián Montoya	Hitech Pulse-Eight	19	+12.897	14	1
11	25	(Australia) Hugh Barter	Campos Racing	19	+13.663	8	
12	3	(United Kingdom) Zak O'Sullivan	Prema Racing	19	+14.829	18	
13	24	(United Kingdom) Christian Mansell	Campos Racing	19	+15.819	13	
14	27	(United Kingdom) Taylor Barnard	Jenzer Motorsport	19	+17.461	30	
15	11	(Spain) Mari Boya	MP Motorsport	19	+18.032	19	
16	26	(Italy) Nikita Bedrin	Jenzer Motorsport	19	+19.240	21	
17	15	(Italy) Gabriele Minì	Hitech Pulse-Eight	19	+19.663	12	
18	22	(Israel) Ido Cohen	Rodin Carlin	19	+23.416	25	
19	5	(Brazil) Gabriel Bortoleto	Trident	19	+24.111^{2}	11	
20	21	(United States) Hunter Yeany	Rodin Carlin	19	+24.671	26	
21	20	(United Kingdom) Oliver Gray	Rodin Carlin	19	+25.049	24	
22	29	(Germany) Sophia Flörsch	PHM Racing by Charouz	19	+25.373	PL	
23	19	(Australia) Tommy Smith	Van Amersfoort Racing	19	+25.951	27	
24	30	(Brazil) Roberto Faria	PHM Racing by Charouz	19	+38.570	29	
25	31	(Poland) Piotr Wiśnicki	PHM Racing by Charouz	19	+45.222	PL	
26	9	(Bulgaria) Nikola Tsolov	ART Grand Prix	19	+47.787	16	
27	28	(Mexico) Alex García	Jenzer Motorsport	19	+1:01.777	28	
28	7	(United States) Kaylen Frederick	ART Grand Prix	19	+1:25.936	7	
DNF	16	(United Kingdom) Luke Browning	Hitech Pulse-Eight	6	Collision damage	17	
DNF	18	(Mexico) Rafael Villagómez	Van Amersfoort Racing	1	Collision	20	
Fastest lap set by (Spain) Pepe Martí: 1:50.867 (lap 14)

Notes

- ^2 – Gabriel Bortoleto originally finished twelfth, but was later given a ten-second time penalty for causing a collision with Rafael Villagómez on lap 2, demoting him to nineteenth place.

=== Feature race ===
Pos.	No.	Driver	Team	Laps	Time/Gap	Grid	Pts.
1	5	(Brazil) Gabriel Bortoleto	Trident	22	44:33.107	2	25 (1)
2	6	(Germany) Oliver Goethe	Trident	22	+0.869	4	18
3	2	(Sweden) Dino Beganovic	Prema Racing	22	+1.109	8	15
4	8	(Switzerland) Grégoire Saucy	ART Grand Prix	22	+1.324	3	12
5	16	(United Kingdom) Luke Browning	Hitech Pulse-Eight	22	+1.691	17	10
6	23	(Spain) Pepe Martí	Campos Racing	22	+1.848	11	8
7	7	(United States) Kaylen Frederick	ART Grand Prix	22	+2.114	6	6
8	15	(Italy) Gabriele Minì	Hitech Pulse-Eight	22	+4.600	1	4 (2)
9	14	(Colombia) Sebastián Montoya	Hitech Pulse-Eight	22	+6.814	14	2
10	10	(Argentina) Franco Colapinto	MP Motorsport	22	+9.834	12	1
11	3	(United Kingdom) Zak O'Sullivan	Prema Racing	22	+15.831	18	
12	1	(Estonia) Paul Aron	Prema Racing	22	+18.181^{3}	9	
13	24	(United Kingdom) Christian Mansell	Campos Racing	22	+18.265	13	
14	17	(Brazil) Caio Collet	Van Amersfoort Racing	22	+19.202	10	
15	9	(Bulgaria) Nikola Tsolov	ART Grand Prix	22	+19.227	16	
16	27	(United Kingdom) Taylor Barnard	Jenzer Motorsport	22	+19.602	30	
17	26	(Italy) Nikita Bedrin	Jenzer Motorsport	22	+22.022	22	
18	22	(Israel) Ido Cohen	Rodin Carlin	22	+25.202	25	
19	18	(Mexico) Rafael Villagómez	Van Amersfoort Racing	22	+25.636	20	
20	29	(Germany) Sophia Flörsch	PHM Racing by Charouz	22	+28.433	24	
21	20	(United Kingdom) Oliver Gray	Rodin Carlin	22	+30.088^{4}	21	
22	21	(United States) Hunter Yeany	Rodin Carlin	22	+35.461	26	
23	12	(United Kingdom) Jonny Edgar	MP Motorsport	22	+36.182	15	
24	31	(Poland) Piotr Wiśnicki	PHM Racing by Charouz	22	+37.365	23	
25	30	(Brazil) Roberto Faria	PHM Racing by Charouz	22	+45.304	29	
26	25	(Australia) Hugh Barter	Campos Racing	22	+1:07.515	5	
27	4	(Italy) Leonardo Fornaroli	Trident	21	+1 lap	7	
28	19	(Australia) Tommy Smith	Van Amersfoort Racing	20	+2 laps^{5}	27	
29	28	(Mexico) Alex García	Jenzer Motorsport	19	+3 laps^{5}	28	
DNF	11	(Spain) Mari Boya	MP Motorsport	6	Collision damage	19	
Fastest lap set by (Brazil) Gabriel Bortoleto: 1:50.743 (lap 2)

Notes

- ^3 – Paul Aron originally finished eleventh, but was later given a five-second time-penalty for causing a collision with Zak O'Sullivan.
- ^4 – Oliver Gray originally finished eighteenth, but was later given a five-second time-penalty for track limits violations.
- ^5 – Tommy Smith and Alex García both retired from the race, but were classified as they completed over 90% of the race distance.

== Standings after the event ==
Drivers' Championship standings

Pos.	Driver	Points
1	(Brazil) Gabriel Bortoleto	26
2	(Germany) Oliver Goethe	23
3	(Sweden) Dino Beganovic	22
4	(Spain) Pepe Martí	19
5	(Switzerland) Grégoire Saucy	16

Teams' Championship standings

Pos.	Team	Points
1	(Italy) Trident	52
2	(Italy) Prema Racing	28
3	(France) ART Grand Prix	22
4	(Spain) Campos Racing	19
5	(United Kingdom) Hitech Pulse-Eight	19

- Note: Only the top five positions are included for both sets of standings.

== See also ==
- 2023 Bahrain Grand Prix
- 2023 Sakhir Formula 2 round

== Notes ==
Previous round: 2022 Monza Formula 3 round	FIA Formula 3 Championship; 2023 season	Next round: 2023 Melbourne Formula 3 round
Previous round: 2022 Sakhir Formula 3 round	Sakhir Formula 3 round	Next round: 2024 Sakhir Formula 3 round
