= 2022 Sakhir Formula 3 round =

(Bahrain) 2022 Sakhir Formula 3 round
Round details
- Round 1 of 9 in the 2022 FIA Formula 3 Championship.
- Layout of the Bahrain International Circuit
- Location: Bahrain International Circuit; Sakhir, Bahrain
- Course: Permanent racing facility 5.412 km (3.363 mi)

Sprint Race
- Date: 19 March 2022
- Laps: 20
Podium
First	(France) Isack Hadjar	Hitech Grand Prix
Second	(United Kingdom) Oliver Bearman	Prema Racing
Third	Alexander Smolyar	MP Motorsport
Fastest lap
Driver	(Barbados) Zane Maloney	Trident
- Time: 1:51.231 (on lap 3)

Feature Race
- Date: 20 March 2022
- Laps: 23
Pole position
Driver	(Argentina) Franco Colapinto	Van Amersfoort Racing
Time	1:46.249	
Podium
First	(France) Victor Martins	ART Grand Prix
Second	(Monaco) Arthur Leclerc	Prema Racing
Third	(Switzerland) Grégoire Saucy	ART Grand Prix
Fastest lap
Driver	(Czech Republic) Roman Staněk	Trident
- Time: 1:51.634 (on lap 7)

The 2022 Sakhir FIA Formula 3 round was a motor racing event held on 19 and 20 March 2022 at the Bahrain International Circuit, Sakhir, Bahrain. It was the opening round of the 2022 FIA Formula 3 Championship, and was held in support of the 2022 Bahrain Grand Prix.

== Classification ==
=== Qualifying ===
The Qualifying session took place on 18 March 2022, with F3 debutant Franco Colapinto scoring his and his team's (Van Amersfoort Racing) first pole-position in the series, while Roman Staněk achieved his best ever qualifying result with second.

Pos.	No.	Driver	Team	Time/Gap	Grid
1	29	(Argentina) Franco Colapinto	Van Amersfoort Racing	1:46.249	1
2	2	(Czech Republic) Roman Staněk	Trident	+0.065	2
3	12	(India) Kush Maini	MP Motorsport	+0.073	PL^{1}
4	8	(Switzerland) Grégoire Saucy	ART Grand Prix	+0.161	3
5	7	(France) Victor Martins	ART Grand Prix	+0.163	4
6	9	(United States) Juan Manuel Correa	ART Grand Prix	+0.351	5
7	3	(Barbados) Zane Maloney	Trident	+0.373	6
8	11	Alexander Smolyar	MP Motorsport	+0.393	7
9	18	(France) Isack Hadjar	Hitech Grand Prix	+0.400	8
10	20	(Spain) David Vidales	Campos Racing	+0.458	9
11	6	(United Kingdom) Oliver Bearman	Prema Racing	+0.594	10
12	26	(United Kingdom) Zak O'Sullivan	Carlin	+0.611	11
13	10	(Brazil) Caio Collet	MP Motorsport	+0.696	12
14	4	(Monaco) Arthur Leclerc	Prema Racing	+0.712	13
15	1	(United Kingdom) Jonny Edgar	Trident	+0.776	14
16	30	(Mexico) Rafael Villagómez	Van Amersfoort Racing	+0.837	15
17	31	(United Kingdom) Reece Ushijima (Note: Ushijima is a Japanese-American driver competing under a British licence.)	Van Amersfoort Racing	+0.874	16
18	25	(Finland) William Alatalo	Jenzer Motorsport	+0.910	17
19	17	(United States) Kaylen Frederick	Hitech Grand Prix	+0.958	18
20	22	(Spain) Pepe Martí	Campos Racing	+1.054	19
21	5	(United States) Jak Crawford	Prema Racing	+1.122	20
22	23	(Israel) Ido Cohen	Jenzer Motorsport	+1.195	21
23	16	(Italy) Francesco Pizzi	Charouz Racing System	+1.250	22
24	27	(Spain) Brad Benavides (Note: Benavides is an American-Spanish-Guatemalan driver competing under a Spanish licence.)	Carlin	+1.317	23
25	24	(Finland) Niko Kari	Jenzer Motorsport	+1.397	24
26	21	(United States) Hunter Yeany	Campos Racing	+1.446	25
27	19	(Malaysia) Nazim Azman	Hitech Grand Prix	+1.453	26
28	28	(Italy) Enzo Trulli	Carlin	+1.547	27
29	15	(United Kingdom) Ayrton Simmons	Charouz Racing System	+1.760	29^{2}
30	14	(Hungary) László Tóth	Charouz Racing System	+2.983	28
107% time: 1:53.686

Notes

- ^1 – Kush Maini qualified in third place, but was forced to start from the pitlane in both races due to missing the weighbridge during the first half of qualifying.
- ^2 – Ayrton Simmons received a three-place penalty for impeding Alexander Smolyar during qualifying. As he had originally qualified in 29th place, he started from last on the grid.

=== Sprint Race ===
Following a battle for the lead between polesitter Zak O'Sullivan and Oliver Bearman the latter was able to build a gap on his competitors. Bearman would cross the line in first place, but was given a time penalty for extending the track on multiple occasions, which promoted fellow rookie Isack Hadjar to the top step of the podium. Bearman ended up second and Alexander Smolyar finished third.

Pos.	No.	Driver	Team	Laps	Time/Gap	Grid	Pts.
1	18	(France) Isack Hadjar	Hitech Grand Prix	20	37:30.285	4	10
2	6	(United Kingdom) Oliver Bearman	Prema Racing	20	+1.589^{3}	2	9
3	11	Alexander Smolyar	MP Motorsport	20	+3.593	5	8
4	3	(Barbados) Zane Maloney	Trident	20	+5.649	6	7 (1)
5	4	(Monaco) Arthur Leclerc	Prema Racing	20	+5.664	13	6
6	26	(United Kingdom) Zak O'Sullivan	Carlin	20	+8.850	1	5
7	10	(Brazil) Caio Collet	MP Motorsport	20	+9.140	12	4
8	17	(United States) Kaylen Frederick	Hitech Grand Prix	20	+11.479	18	3
9	9	(United States) Juan Manuel Correa	ART Grand Prix	20	+12.153	7	2
10	20	(Spain) David Vidales	Campos Racing	20	+19.134	3	1
11	25	(Finland) William Alatalo	Jenzer Motorsport	20	+21.251	17	
12	31	(United Kingdom) Reece Ushijima	Van Amersfoort Racing	20	+21.871	16	
13	1	(United Kingdom) Jonny Edgar	Trident	20	+28.399	14	
14	23	(Israel) Ido Cohen	Jenzer Motorsport	20	+29.919	21	
15	12	(India) Kush Maini	MP Motorsport	20	+30.741	PL	
16	19	(Malaysia) Nazim Azman	Hitech Grand Prix	20	+34.890	26	
17	30	(Mexico) Rafael Villagómez	Van Amersfoort Racing	20	+34.911	15	
18	15	(United Kingdom) Ayrton Simmons	Charouz Racing System	20	+44.886	29	
19	16	(Italy) Francesco Pizzi	Charouz Racing System	20	+45.648	22	
20	28	(Italy) Enzo Trulli	Carlin	20	+46.577	27	
21	27	(Spain) Brad Benavides	Carlin	20	+53.412	23	
22	14	(Hungary) László Tóth	Charouz Racing System	20	+53.720^{3}	28	
23	21	(United States) Hunter Yeany	Campos Racing	20	+54.278^{4}	25	
24	2	(Czech Republic) Roman Staněk	Trident	20	+1:07.166	10	
25	29	(Argentina) Franco Colapinto	Van Amersfoort Racing	20	+1:16.651	11	
26	24	(Finland) Niko Kari	Jenzer Motorsport	20	+1:39.371	24	
27	5	(United States) Jak Crawford	Prema Racing	20	+1:40.417	20	
28	22	(Spain) Pepe Martí	Campos Racing	19	+1 lap	19	
DNF	8	(Switzerland) Grégoire Saucy	ART Grand Prix	7	Collision damage	9	
DNF	7	(France) Victor Martins	ART Grand Prix	5	Collision damage	8	
Fastest lap set by (Barbados) Zane Maloney: 1:51.231 (lap 3)

Notes

- ^3 – Oliver Bearman and László Tóth originally finished the race first and 21st, but were each given a five-second penalty for track limit infringements.
- ^4 – Hunter Yeany received a ten-second time penalty for exceeding the track limits on multiple occasions, demoting him from 18th to 23rd.

=== Feature Race ===
Pos.	No.	Driver	Team	Laps	Time/Gap	Grid	Pts.
1	7	(France) Victor Martins	ART Grand Prix	23	46:47.389	3	25
2	4	(Monaco) Arthur Leclerc	Prema Racing	23	+1.543	13	18
3	8	(Switzerland) Grégoire Saucy	ART Grand Prix	23	+6.812	6	15
4	9	(United States) Juan Manuel Correa	ART Grand Prix	23	+9.084	4	12
5	29	(Argentina) Franco Colapinto	Van Amersfoort Racing	23	+11.193	1	10 (2)
6	6	(United Kingdom) Oliver Bearman	Prema Racing	23	+14.582	10	8
7	5	(United States) Jak Crawford	Prema Racing	23	+18.765	20	6
8	20	(Spain) David Vidales	Campos Racing	23	+23.004	9	4
9	25	(Finland) William Alatalo	Jenzer Motorsport	23	+23.665	17	2
10	17	(United States) Kaylen Frederick	Hitech Grand Prix	23	+23.843	18	1
11	1	(United Kingdom) Jonny Edgar	Trident	23	+26.906	14	
12	30	(Mexico) Rafael Villagómez	Van Amersfoort Racing	23	+28.274	15	
13	22	(Spain) Pepe Martí	Campos Racing	23	+30.194	19	
14	24	(Finland) Niko Kari	Jenzer Motorsport	23	+35.044	29	
15	23	(Israel) Ido Cohen	Jenzer Motorsport	23	+35.068	21	
16	12	(India) Kush Maini	MP Motorsport	23	+35.111	PL	
17	31	(United Kingdom) Reece Ushijima	Van Amersfoort Racing	23	+35.790	16	
18	26	(United Kingdom) Zak O'Sullivan	Carlin	23	+36.274	11	
19	15	(United Kingdom) Ayrton Simmons	Charouz Racing System	23	+36.792	27	
20	27	(Spain) Brad Benavides	Carlin	23	+38.167	23	
21	21	(United States) Hunter Yeany	Campos Racing	23	+38.297^{5}	24	
22	2	(Czech Republic) Roman Staněk	Trident	23	+38.303	2	
23	11	Alexander Smolyar	MP Motorsport	23	+38.795^{6}	7	
24	14	(Hungary) László Tóth	Charouz Racing System	23	+39.952	28	
25	18	(France) Isack Hadjar	Hitech Grand Prix	23	+49.781	8	
26	28	(Italy) Enzo Trulli	Carlin	23	+1:11.611^{7}	26	
DNF	19	(Malaysia) Nazim Azman	Hitech Grand Prix	4	Collision/Spin	25	
DNF	10	(Brazil) Caio Collet	MP Motorsport	1	Collision damage	12	
DNF	3	(Barbados) Zane Maloney	Trident	0	Engine	5	
DNF	16	(Italy) Francesco Pizzi	Charouz Racing System	0	Collision	22	
Fastest lap set by (Czech Republic) Roman Staněk: 1:51.634 (lap 7)

Notes

- ^5 - Hunter Yeany originally finished in 14th place, but was demoted to 21st by virtue of a five-second penalty for causing a collision with Niko Kari.
- ^6 - Alexander Smolyar originally finished in 8th place, but was given a total penalty of 20 seconds due to both exceeding track limits and causing a collision with Isack Hadjar respectively, demoting him to 23rd.
- ^7 - Enzo Trulli received a ten-second time penalty for causing a collision with Francesco Pizzi.

== Standings after the event ==
Drivers' Championship standings

Pos.	Driver	Points
1	(France) Victor Martins	25
2	(Monaco) Arthur Leclerc	24
3	(United Kingdom) Oliver Bearman	17
4	(Switzerland) Grégoire Saucy	15
5	(United States) Juan Manuel Correa	14

Teams' Championship standings

Pos.	Team	Points
1	(France) ART Grand Prix	54
2	(Italy) Prema Racing	47
3	(United Kingdom) Hitech Grand Prix	14
4	(Netherlands) MP Motorsport	12
5	(Netherlands) Van Amersfoort Racing	12

- Note: Only the top five positions are included for both sets of standings.

== See also ==
- 2022 Bahrain Grand Prix
- 2022 Sakhir Formula 2 round

== Notes ==
Previous round: 2021 Sochi Formula 3 round	FIA Formula 3 Championship; 2022 season	Next round: 2022 Imola Formula 3 round
Previous round: 2015 Bahrain GP3 Series round	Sakhir Formula 3 round	Next round: 2023 Sakhir Formula 3 round
