= 2017 Monza GP3 Series round =

Motor race competition

(Italy) 2017 Monza GP3 round
Round details
- Round 6 of 8 rounds in the 2017 GP3 Series
- Layout of the Autodromo Nazionale Monza
- Location: Autodromo Nazionale Monza, Monza, Italy
- Course: Permanent racing facility 5.793 km (3.600 mi)

GP3 Series

Race 1
- Date: 3 September 2017
- Laps: 21

Pole position
Driver	(Japan) Nirei Fukuzumi	ART Grand Prix
- Time: 1:38.594

Podium
First	(United Kingdom) George Russell	ART Grand Prix
Second	(United Kingdom) Jack Aitken	ART Grand Prix
Third	(France) Anthoine Hubert	ART Grand Prix

Fastest lap
Driver	(France) Anthoine Hubert	ART Grand Prix
- Time: 1:40.232 (on lap 11)

Race 2
- Date: 2 September 2017
- Laps: 17

Podium
First	Race cancelled	N/A
Second	Race cancelled	N/A
Third	Race cancelled	N/A

Fastest lap
Driver	Race cancelled	N/A
- Time: NC

The 2017 Monza GP3 Series round was the sixth round of the 2017 GP3 Series. It was held on 2 and 3 September 2017 at Autodromo Nazionale Monza in Monza, Italy. The race supported the 2017 Italian Grand Prix.

Heavy rain forced the rescheduling of race 1 to the original spot of race 2, leaving no time for race 2 to take place.

== Classification ==
=== Qualifying ===
Pos.	No.	Driver	Team	Time	Gap	Grid
1	2	(Japan) Nirei Fukuzumi	ART Grand Prix	1:38.594		1
2	3	(United Kingdom) George Russell	ART Grand Prix	1:38.693	+0.099	2
3	4	(France) Anthoine Hubert	ART Grand Prix	1:38.776	+0.182	3
4	1	(United Kingdom) Jack Aitken	ART Grand Prix	1:38.786	+0.192	4
5	12	(France) Dorian Boccolacci	Trident	1:38.933	+0.339	5
6	7	(Netherlands) Steijn Schothorst	Arden International	1:38.963	+0.369	6
7	6	(Italy) Leonardo Pulcini	Arden International	1:38.971	+0.377	7
8	24	(India) Arjun Maini	Jenzer Motorsport	1:39.033	+0.439	8
9	22	(Italy) Alessio Lorandi	Jenzer Motorsport	1:39.148	+0.554	9
10	14	(United Kingdom) Dan Ticktum	DAMS	1:39.232	+0.638	10
11	28	(Argentina) Marcos Siebert	Campos Racing	1:39.298	+0.704	11
12	23	(United States) Juan Manuel Correa	Jenzer Motorsport	1:39.470	+0.876	12
13	10	(France) Giuliano Alesi	Trident	1:39.518	+0.924	13
14	5	(Finland) Niko Kari	Arden International	1:39.565	+0.971	14
15	27	(South Africa) Raoul Hyman	Campos Racing	1:39.776	+1.182	15
16	16	(Brazil) Bruno Baptista	DAMS	1:39.860	+1.266	16
17	11	(United States) Ryan Tveter	Trident	1:39.923	+1.329	17
18	26	(France) Julien Falchero	Campos Racing	1:39.968	+1.374	18
19	15	(Colombia) Tatiana Calderon	DAMS	1:40.411	+1.817	19
20	9	(Switzerland) Kevin Jörg	Trident	1:41.112	+2.518	20

- Heavy rains forced the cancellation of qualifying. Nirei Fukuzumi was credited with pole position as he had set the fastest lap time during free practice.

=== Feature race ===
Pos.	No.	Driver	Team	Laps	Time/Gap	Grid	Points
1	3	(United Kingdom) George Russell	ART Grand Prix	21	44:15.898	2	25
2	1	(United Kingdom) Jack Aitken	ART Grand Prix	21	+1.526	4	18
3	4	(France) Anthoine Hubert	ART Grand Prix	21	+2.361	3	15 (2)
4	28	(Argentina) Marcos Siebert	Campos Racing	21	+2.959	11	12
5	11	(United States) Ryan Tveter	Trident	21	+5.026	17	10
6	10	(France) Giuliano Alesi	Trident	21	+5.351	13	8
7	15	(Colombia) Tatiana Calderon	DAMS	21	+6.448	19	6
8	26	(France) Julien Falchero	Campos Racing	21	+7.044	18	4
9	9	(Switzerland) Kevin Jörg	Trident	21	+7.207	20	2
10	16	(Brazil) Bruno Baptista	DAMS	21	+8.879	16	1
11	27	(South Africa) Raoul Hyman	Campos Racing	21	+9.567	15	
12	7	(Netherlands) Steijn Schothorst	Arden International	21	+9.645	6	
13	14	(United Kingdom) Dan Ticktum	DAMS	21	+16.268	10	
14	12	(France) Dorian Boccolacci	Trident	21	+40.836	5	
DNF	5	(Finland) Niko Kari	Arden International	19	Accident	14	
DNF	24	(India) Arjun Maini	Jenzer Motorsport	18	Rear wing Damage	8	
Ret	23	(United States) Juan Manuel Correa	Jenzer Motorsport	12	Accident	12	
Ret	6	(Italy) Leonardo Pulcini	Arden International	0	Collision	7	
Ret	22	(Italy) Alessio Lorandi	Jenzer Motorsport	0	Collision	9	
DNS	2	(Japan) Nirei Fukuzumi	ART Grand Prix	0	Did not start	1	(4)
Fastest lap: (France) Anthoine Hubert − ART Grand Prix − 1:40.232 (lap 11)

== Championship standings after the round ==
Drivers' Championship standings

	Pos.	Driver	Points
	1	(United Kingdom) George Russell	162
	2	(United Kingdom) Jack Aitken	119
	3	(Japan) Nirei Fukuzumi	99
1	4	(France) Anthoine Hubert	97
1	5	(France) Giuliano Alesi	95

Teams' Championship standings

	Pos.	Team	Points
	1	(France) ART Grand Prix	463
	2	(Italy) Trident	222
	3	(Switzerland) Jenzer Motorsport	116
1	4	(Spain) Campos Racing	55
1	5	(United Kingdom) Arden International	48

- Note: Only the top five positions are included for both sets of standings.

== See also ==
- 2017 Italian Grand Prix
- 2017 Monza Formula 2 round

Previous round: 2017 Spa-Francorchamps GP3 Series round	GP3 Series; 2017 season	Next round: 2017 Jerez GP3 Series round
Previous round: 2016 Monza GP3 Series round	Monza GP3 round	Next round: 2018 Monza GP3 Series round
