= 2017 Spa-Francorchamps GP3 Series round =

(Belgium) 2017 Spa-Francorchamps GP3 round
Round details
- Round 5 of 8 rounds in the 2017 GP3 Series
- Location: Circuit de Spa-Francorchamps, Stavelot, Belgium
- Course: Permanent racing facility 7.004 km (4.352 mi)

GP3 Series

Race 1
- Date: 26 August 2017
- Laps: 17

Pole position
Driver	(United Kingdom) George Russell	ART Grand Prix
- Time: 2:27.042

Podium
First	(United Kingdom) George Russell	ART Grand Prix
Second	(United Kingdom) Jack Aitken	ART Grand Prix
Third	(Japan) Nirei Fukuzumi	ART Grand Prix

Fastest lap
Driver	(United Kingdom) George Russell	ART Grand Prix
- Time: 2:08.433 (on lap 5)

Race 2
- Date: 27 August 2017
- Laps: 13

Podium
First	(France) Giuliano Alesi	Trident
Second	(United Kingdom) George Russell	ART Grand Prix
Third	(United States) Ryan Tveter	Trident

Fastest lap
Driver	(United Kingdom) George Russell	ART Grand Prix
- Time: 2:06.961 (on lap 5)

The 2017 Spa-Francorchamps GP3 Series round was the fifth round of the 2017 GP3 Series. It was held on 26 and 27 August 2017 at Circuit de Spa-Francorchamps in Stavelot, Belgium. The race supported the 2017 Belgian Grand Prix.

== Classification ==
=== Qualifying ===
Pos.	No.	Driver	Team	Time	Gap	Grid
1	3	(United Kingdom) George Russell	ART Grand Prix	2:27.042		1
2	2	(Japan) Nirei Fukuzumi	ART Grand Prix	2:27.316	+0.274	2
3	24	(India) Arjun Maini	Jenzer Motorsport	2:27.741	+0.699	3
4	1	(United Kingdom) Jack Aitken	ART Grand Prix	2:28.039	+0.997	4
5	14	(France) Matthieu Vaxivière	DAMS	2:28.474	+1.432	5
6	12	(France) Dorian Boccolacci	Trident	2:28.593	+1.551	6
7	11	(United States) Ryan Tveter	Trident	2:28.814	+1.772	7
8	7	(Netherlands) Steijn Schothorst	Arden International	2:28.857	+1.815	8
9	26	(France) Julien Falchero	Campos Racing	2:29.110	+2.068	9
10	15	(Colombia) Tatiana Calderon	DAMS	2:29.118	+2.076	10
11	22	(Italy) Alessio Lorandi	Jenzer Motorsport	2:29.267	+2.225	11
12	10	(France) Giuliano Alesi	Trident	2:29.270	+2.228	12
13	9	(Switzerland) Kevin Jörg	Trident	2:29.461	+2.419	13
14	28	(Argentina) Marcos Siebert	Campos Racing	2:29.546	+2.504	14
15	6	(Italy) Leonardo Pulcini	Arden International	2:29.744	+2.702	15
16	5	(Finland) Niko Kari	Arden International	2:29.766	+2.724	16
17	4	(France) Anthoine Hubert	ART Grand Prix	2:29.882	+2.840	17
18	27	(South Africa) Raoul Hyman	Campos Racing	2:29.925	+2.883	18
19	16	(Brazil) Bruno Baptista	DAMS	2:29.981	+2.939	19
20	23	(United States) Juan Manuel Correa	Jenzer Motorsport	2:30.587	+3.545	20

=== Feature race ===
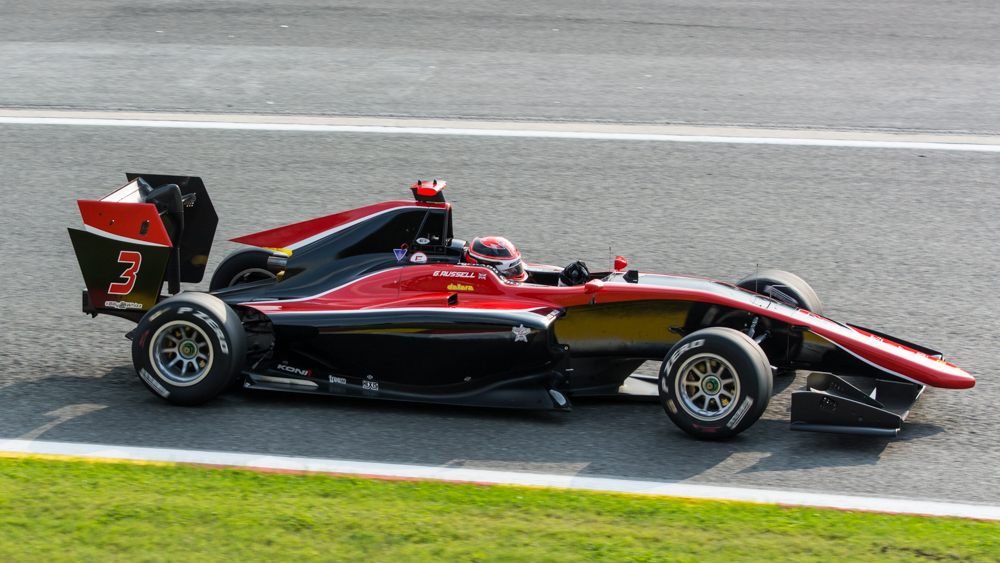
George Russell

Pos.	No.	Driver	Team	Laps	Time/Retired	Grid	Points
1	3	(United Kingdom) George Russell	ART Grand Prix	17	37:47.103	1	25 (6)
2	1	(United Kingdom) Jack Aitken	ART Grand Prix	17	+7.460	4	18
3	2	(Japan) Nirei Fukuzumi	ART Grand Prix	17	+7.807	2	15
4	24	(India) Arjun Maini	Jenzer Motorsport	17	+9.259	3	12
5	12	(France) Dorian Boccolacci	Trident	17	+14.409	6	10
6	11	(United States) Ryan Tveter	Trident	17	+15.106	7	8
7	10	(France) Giuliano Alesi	Trident	17	+15.502	12	6
8	26	(France) Julien Falchero	Campos Racing	17	+23.361	9	4
9	5	(Finland) Niko Kari	Arden International	17	+26.210	16	2
10	9	(Switzerland) Kevin Jörg	Trident	17	+26.514	13	1
11	6	(Italy) Leonardo Pulcini	Arden International	17	+27.620	15	
12	22	(Italy) Alessio Lorandi	Jenzer Motorsport	17	+29.201	11	
13	7	(Netherlands) Steijn Schothorst	Arden International	17	+35.149	8	
14	27	(South Africa) Raoul Hyman	Campos Racing	17	+38.400	18	
15	23	(United States) Juan Manuel Correa	Jenzer Motorsport	17	+38.625	20	
16	15	(Colombia) Tatiana Calderon	DAMS	17	+43.005	10	
Ret	28	(Argentina) Marcos Siebert	Campos Racing	14	DNF	14	
Ret	14	(France) Matthieu Vaxivière	DAMS	7	DNF	5	
Ret	4	(France) Anthoine Hubert	ART Grand Prix	4	DNF	17	
Ret	16	(Brazil) Bruno Baptista	DAMS	2	Accident	19	
Fastest lap: (United Kingdom) George Russell − ART Grand Prix − 2:08.433 (on lap 5)

=== Sprint race ===
Pos.	No.	Driver	Team	Laps	Time/Retired	Grid	Points
1	10	(France) Giuliano Alesi	Trident	13	27:50.961	2	15
2	3	(United Kingdom) George Russell	ART Grand Prix	13	+3.332	8	12 (2)
3	11	(United States) Ryan Tveter	Trident	13	+7.089	3	10
4	2	(Japan) Nirei Fukuzumi	ART Grand Prix	13	+10.902	6	8
5	26	(France) Julien Falchero	Campos Racing	13	+12.670	1	6
6	24	(India) Arjun Maini	Jenzer Motorsport	13	+14.395	5	4
7	4	(France) Anthoine Hubert	ART Grand Prix	13	+14.667	19	2
8	9	(Switzerland) Kevin Jörg	Trident	13	+18.291	10	1
9	5	(Finland) Niko Kari	Arden International	13	+18.544	9	
10	27	(South Africa) Raoul Hyman	Campos Racing	13	+19.419	14	
11	6	(Italy) Leonardo Pulcini	Arden International	13	+21.689	11	
12	7	(Netherlands) Steijn Schothorst	Arden International	13	+22.074	13	
13	15	(Colombia) Tatiana Calderon	DAMS	13	+22.490	16	
14	22	(Italy) Alessio Lorandi	Jenzer Motorsport	13	+23.413	12	
15	14	(France) Matthieu Vaxivière	DAMS	13	+27.895	18	
16	16	(Brazil) Bruno Baptista	DAMS	13	+30.361	20	
17	12	(France) Dorian Boccolacci	Trident	13	+1:37.635	4	
18	1	(United Kingdom) Jack Aitken	ART Grand Prix	11	+2 laps	7	
Ret	28	(Argentina) Marcos Siebert	Campos Racing	10	DNF	17	
Ret	23	(United States) Juan Manuel Correa	Jenzer Motorsport	9	DNF	15	
Fastest lap: (United Kingdom) George Russell − ART Grand Prix − 2:06.961 (on lap 5)

== Championship standings after the round ==
Drivers' Championship standings

	Pos.	Driver	Points
	1	(United Kingdom) George Russell	137
	2	(United Kingdom) Jack Aitken	101
1	3	(Japan) Nirei Fukuzumi	95
1	4	(France) Giuliano Alesi	87
2	5	(France) Anthoine Hubert	80

Teams' Championship standings

Pos.	Team	Points
1	(France) ART Grand Prix	399
2	(Italy) Trident	202
3	(Switzerland) Jenzer Motorsport	116
4	(United Kingdom) Arden International	48
5	(Spain) Campos Racing	39

- Note: Only the top five positions are included for both sets of standings.

== See also ==
- 2017 Belgian Grand Prix
- 2017 Spa-Francorchamps Formula 2 round

Previous round: 2017 Budapest GP3 Series round	GP3 Series; 2017 season	Next round: 2017 Monza GP3 Series round
Previous round: 2016 Spa-Francorchamps GP3 Series round	Spa-Francorchamps GP3 round	Next round: 2018 Spa-Francorchamps GP3 Series round
