= 2017 Jerez GP3 Series round =

(Spain) 2017 Jerez GP3 round
Round details
- Round 7 of 8 rounds in the 2017 GP3 Series
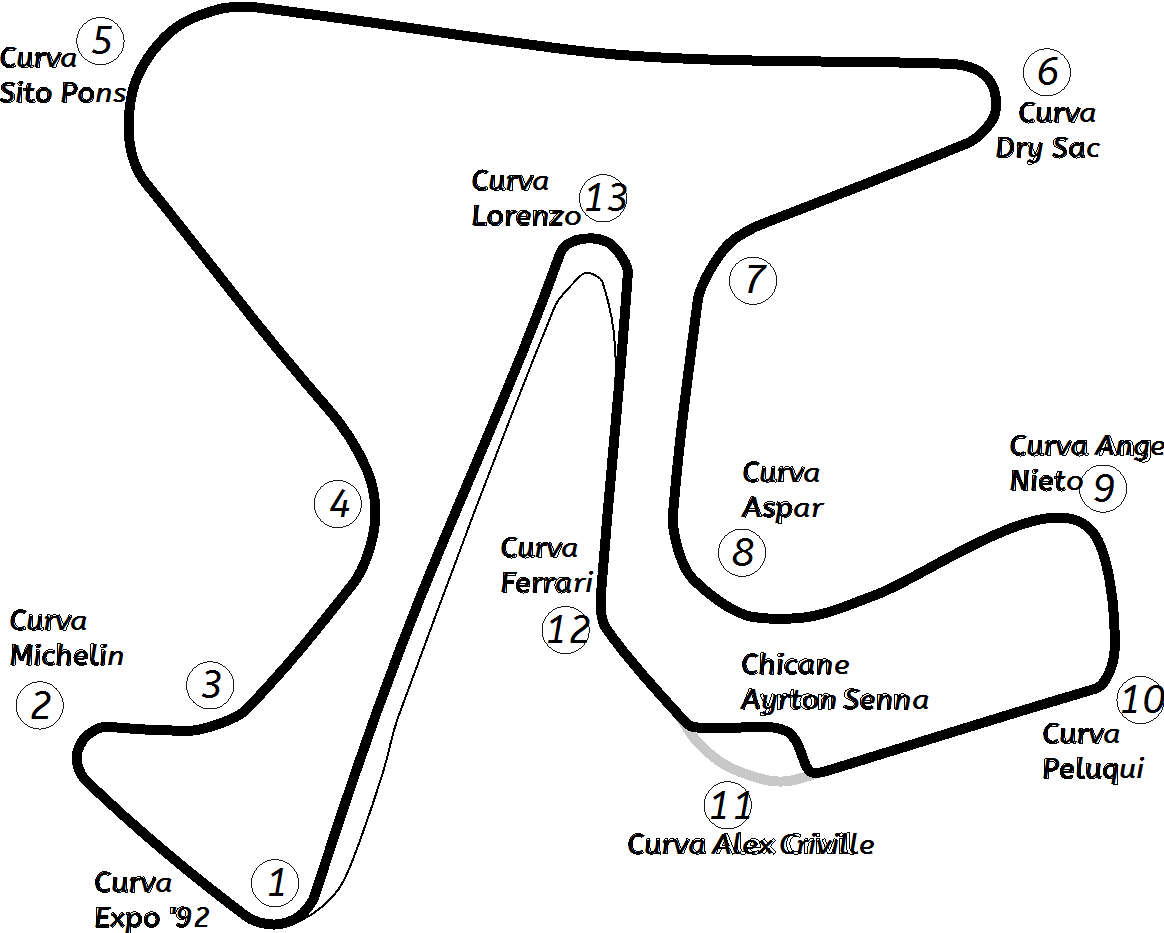
- Location: Circuito de Jerez, Jerez de la Frontera, Spain
- Course: Permanent racing facility 4.428 km (2.751 mi)

GP3 Series

Race 1
- Date: 7 October 2017
- Laps: 23

Pole position
Driver	(Japan) Nirei Fukuzumi	ART Grand Prix
- Time: 1:30.678

Podium
First	(Japan) Nirei Fukuzumi	ART Grand Prix
Second	(United Kingdom) George Russell	ART Grand Prix
Third	(United Kingdom) Jack Aitken	ART Grand Prix

Fastest lap
Driver	(South Africa) Raoul Hyman (Note: Raoul Hyman set the fastest lap, but did not finish in the top 10, so was ineligible to be the point-scorer for the fastest lap. Jack Aitken was the point-scorer instead for setting the fastest lap of those finishing in the top 10.)	Campos Racing
- Time: 1:33.073 (on lap 23)

Race 2
- Date: 8 October 2017
- Laps: 17

Podium
First	(Italy) Alessio Lorandi	Jenzer Motorsport
Second	(France) Dorian Boccolacci	Trident
Third	(France) Anthoine Hubert	ART Grand Prix

Fastest lap
Driver	(United Kingdom) George Russell	ART Grand Prix
- Time: 1:32.279 (on lap 4)

The 2017 Jerez GP3 Series round was the penultimate round of the 2017 GP3 Series. It was held on 7 and 8 October 2017 at Circuito de Jerez in Jerez de la Frontera, Spain. The race supported the 2017 Jerez Formula 2 round.

== Classification ==
=== Qualifying ===
Pos.	No.	Driver	Team	Time	Gap	Grid
1	2	(Japan) Nirei Fukuzumi	ART Grand Prix	1:30.678		1
2	1	(United Kingdom) Jack Aitken	ART Grand Prix	1:30.847	+0.169	2
3	3	(United Kingdom) George Russell	ART Grand Prix	1:30.889	+0.211	3
4	14	(United Kingdom) Dan Ticktum	DAMS	1:31.031	+0.353	4
5	4	(France) Anthoine Hubert	ART Grand Prix	1:31.140	+0.463	5
6	22	(Italy) Alessio Lorandi	Jenzer Motorsport	1:31.334	+0.656	6
7	12	(France) Dorian Boccolacci	Trident	1:31.389	+0.711	7
8	5	(Finland) Niko Kari	Arden International	1:31.404	+0.727	8
9	15	(Colombia) Tatiana Calderon	DAMS	1:31.478	+0.800	9
10	7	(Netherlands) Steijn Schothorst	Arden International	1:31.507	+0.829	10
11	10	(France) Giuliano Alesi	Trident	1:31.593	+0.915	11
12	9	(Switzerland) Kevin Jörg	Trident	1:31.661	+0.983	12
13	11	(United States) Ryan Tveter	Trident	1:31.689	+1.011	13
14	26	(France) Julien Falchero	Campos Racing	1:31.707	+1.029	14
15	28	(Argentina) Marcos Siebert	Campos Racing	1:31.707	+1.029	15
16	6	(Italy) Leonardo Pulcini	Arden International	1:31.726	+1.048	16
17	27	(South Africa) Raoul Hyman	Campos Racing	1:31.984	+1.306	17
18	23	(United States) Juan Manuel Correa	Jenzer Motorsport	1:32.019	+1.341	18
19	24	(India) Arjun Maini	Jenzer Motorsport	1:32.139	+1.461	19
20	16	(Brazil) Bruno Baptista	DAMS	1:32.161	+1.483	20

=== Feature Race ===
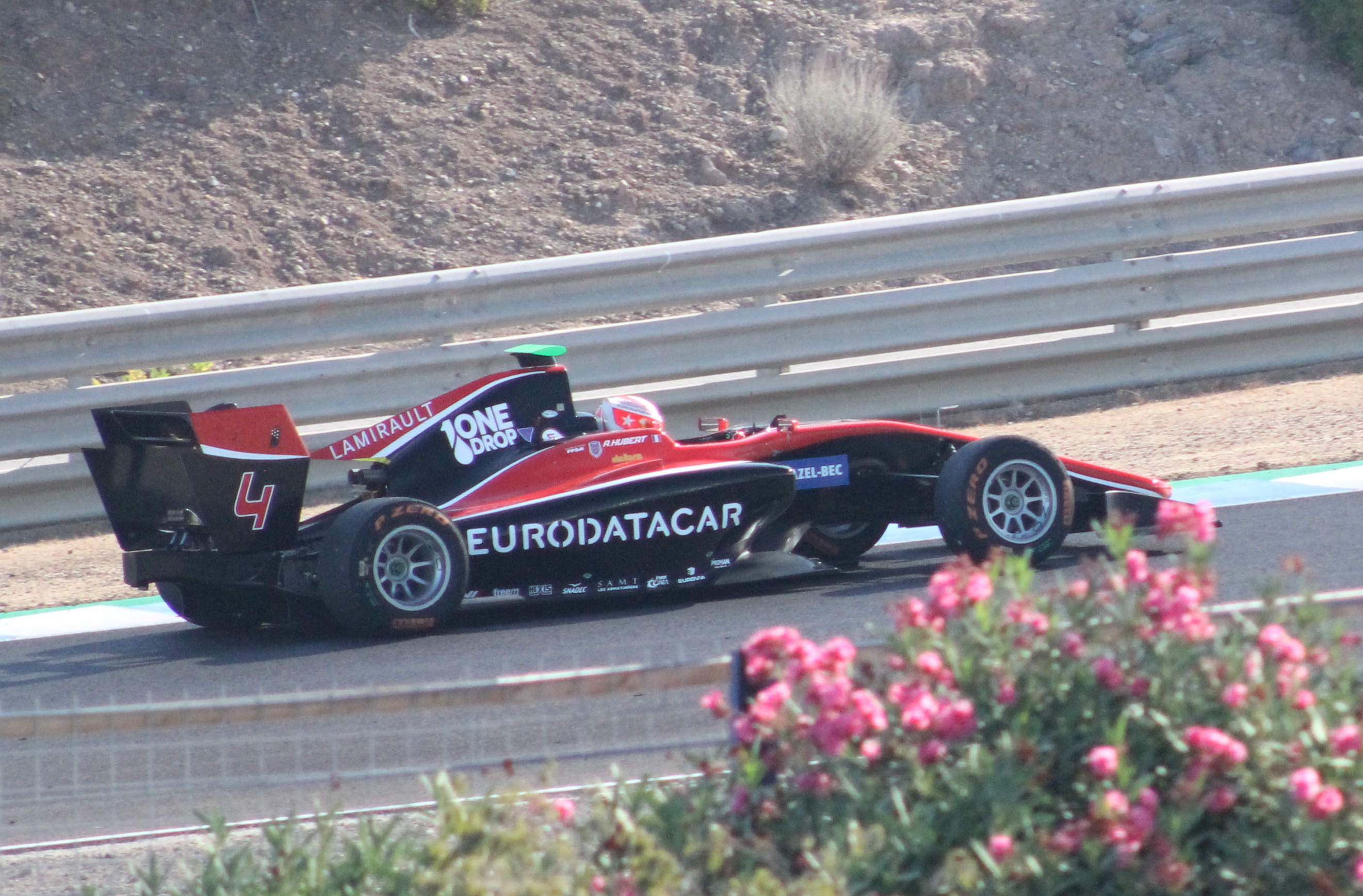
Anthoine Hubert

Pos.	No.	Driver	Team	Laps	Time/Retired	Grid	Points
1	2	(Japan) Nirei Fukuzumi	ART Grand Prix	23	35:57:969	1	25 (4)
2	3	(United Kingdom) George Russell	ART Grand Prix	23	+1.559	3	18
3	1	(United Kingdom) Jack Aitken	ART Grand Prix	23	+3.128	2	15 (2)
4	14	(United Kingdom) Dan Ticktum	DAMS	23	+5.459	4	12
5	4	(France) Anthoine Hubert	ART Grand Prix	23	+8.146	5	10
6	5	(Finland) Niko Kari	Arden International	23	+10.299	8	8
7	12	(France) Dorian Boccolacci	Trident	23	+12.514	7	6
8	22	(Italy) Alessio Lorandi	Jenzer Motorsport	23	+19.393	6	4
9	10	(France) Giuliano Alesi	Trident	23	+18.055	11	2
10	26	(France) Julien Falchero	Campos Racing	23	+19.984	14	1
11	7	(Netherlands) Steijn Schothorst	Arden International	23	+21.574	10	
12	11	(United States) Ryan Tveter	Trident	23	+21.869	13	
13	15	(Colombia) Tatiana Calderon	DAMS	23	+22.371	9	
14	6	(Italy) Leonardo Pulcini	Arden International	23	+23.131	16	
15	23	(United States) Juan Manuel Correa	Jenzer Motorsport	23	+23.710	18	
16	16	(Brazil) Bruno Baptista	DAMS	23	+30.610	20	
17	24	(India) Arjun Maini	Jenzer Motorsport	23	+31.203	19	
18	28	(Argentina) Marcos Siebert	Campos Racing	23	+1:09.306	15	
19	27	(South Africa) Raoul Hyman	Campos Racing	23	+1:20.941	17	
20	9	(Switzerland) Kevin Jörg	Trident	22	+1 Lap	12	
Fastest lap: (South Africa) Raoul Hyman − Campos Racing − 1:33.073 (lap 23)

=== Sprint Race ===
Pos.	No.	Driver	Team	Laps	Time/Retired	Grid	Points
1	22	(Italy) Alessio Lorandi	Jenzer Motorsport	17	28:05:939	1	15
2	12	(France) Dorian Boccolacci	Trident	17	+0.743	2	12
3	4	(France) Anthoine Hubert	ART Grand Prix	17	+1.696	4	10
4	3	(United Kingdom) George Russell	ART Grand Prix	17	+2.722	7	8 (2)
5	2	(Japan) Nirei Fukuzumi	ART Grand Prix	17	+3.065	8	6
6	1	(United Kingdom) Jack Aitken	ART Grand Prix	17	+3.617	6	4
7	10	(France) Giuliano Alesi	Trident	17	+4.077	9	2
8	15	(Colombia) Tatiana Calderon	DAMS	17	+4.376	13	1
9	26	(France) Julien Falchero	Campos Racing	17	+5.198	10	
10	7	(Netherlands) Steijn Schothorst	Arden International	17	+5.563	11	
11	6	(Italy) Leonardo Pulcini	Arden International	17	+5.948	14	
12	24	(India) Arjun Maini	Jenzer Motorsport	17	+6.576	17	
13	16	(Brazil) Bruno Baptista	DAMS	17	+6.960	16	
14	11	(United States) Ryan Tveter	Trident	17	+7.228	12	
15	27	(South Africa) Raoul Hyman	Campos Racing	17	+7.723	19	
16	23	(United States) Juan Manuel Correa	Jenzer Motorsport	17	+8.096	15	
17	28	(Argentina) Marcos Siebert	Campos Racing	17	+8.637	18	
18	9	(Switzerland) Kevin Jörg	Trident	17	+8.746	20	
19	5	(Finland) Niko Kari	Arden International	17	+11.510	3	
Ret	14	(United Kingdom) Dan Ticktum	DAMS	13	Accident	5	
Fastest lap: (United Kingdom) George Russell − ART Grand Prix − 1:32.279 (lap 4)

== Championship standings after the round ==
Drivers' Championship standings

Pos.	Driver	Points
1	(United Kingdom) George Russell	190
2	(United Kingdom) Jack Aitken	140
3	(Japan) Nirei Fukuzumi	134
4	(France) Anthoine Hubert	117
5	(France) Giuliano Alesi	99

Teams' Championship standings

Pos.	Team	Points
1	(France) ART Grand Prix	553
2	(Italy) Trident	244
3	(Switzerland) Jenzer Motorsport	135
4	(Spain) Campos Racing	56
5	(United Kingdom) Arden International	56

- Note: Only the top five positions are included for both sets of standings.

== See also ==
- 2017 Jerez Formula 2 round

== Notes ==
Previous round: 2017 Monza GP3 Series round	GP3 Series; 2017 season	Next round: 2017 Yas Marina GP3 Series round
Previous round: None	Jerez GP3 round	Next round: None
