= 2017 Yas Marina GP3 Series round =

(United Arab Emirates) 2017 Yas Marina GP3 round
Round details
- Round 8 of 8 rounds in the 2017 GP3 Series
- Location: Yas Marina Circuit Abu Dhabi, United Arab Emirates
- Course: Permanent racing facility 5.554 km (3.451 mi)

GP3 Series

Race 1
- Date: 25 November 2017
- Laps: 18

Pole position
Driver	(United Kingdom) George Russell	ART Grand Prix
- Time: 1:54.751

Podium
First	(Finland) Niko Kari	Arden International
Second	(United Kingdom) George Russell	ART Grand Prix
Third	(India) Arjun Maini	Jenzer Motorsport

Fastest lap
Driver	(Japan) Nirei Fukuzumi (Note: Nirei Fukuzumi set the fastest lap, but did not finish in the top 10, so was ineligible to be the point-scorer for the fastest lap. Niko Kari was the point-scorer instead for setting the fastest lap of those finishing in the top 10.)	ART Grand Prix
- Time: 1:57.544 (on lap 18)

Race 2
- Date: 26 November 2017
- Laps: 14

Podium
First	(France) Dorian Boccolacci	Trident
Second	(United States) Ryan Tveter	Trident
Third	(United Kingdom) Dan Ticktum	DAMS

Fastest lap
Driver	(Japan) Nirei Fukuzumi (Note: Nirei Fukuzumi set the fastest lap, but did not finish in the top 10, so was ineligible to be the point-scorer for the fastest lap. Dan Ticktum was the point-scorer instead for setting the fastest lap of those finishing in the top 10.)	ART Grand Prix
- Time: 1:57.662 (on lap 6)

The 2017 Yas Marina GP3 Series round was the final round of the 2017 GP3 Series. It was held on 25 and 26 November 2017 at Yas Marina Circuit in Abu Dhabi, United Arab Emirates. The race supported the 2017 Abu Dhabi Grand Prix.

== Classification ==
=== Qualifying ===
Pos.	No.	Driver	Team	Time	Gap	Grid
1	3	(United Kingdom) George Russell	ART Grand Prix	1:54.751		1
2	6	(Italy) Leonardo Pulcini	Arden International	1:55.073	+0.322	2
3	5	(Finland) Niko Kari	Arden International	1:55.157	+0.406	3
4	14	(United Kingdom) Dan Ticktum	DAMS	1:55.289	+0.538	4
5	24	(India) Arjun Maini	Jenzer Motorsport	1:55.466	+0.715	5
6	2	(Japan) Nirei Fukuzumi	ART Grand Prix	1:55.484	+0.733	6
7	12	(France) Dorian Boccolacci	Trident	1:55.533	+0.782	7
8	27	(South Africa) Raoul Hyman	Campos Racing	1:55.583	+0.832	8
9	4	(France) Anthoine Hubert	ART Grand Prix	1:55.594	+0.843	9
10	22	(Italy) Alessio Lorandi	Jenzer Motorsport	1:55.605	+0.854	10
11	7	(Netherlands) Steijn Schothorst	Arden International	1:55.610	+0.859	11
12	11	(United States) Ryan Tveter	Trident	1:55.684	+0.933	12
13	15	(Colombia) Tatiana Calderon	DAMS	1:55.772	+1.021	13
14	9	(Switzerland) Kevin Jörg	Trident	1:55.774	+1.023	14
15	1	(United Kingdom) Jack Aitken	ART Grand Prix	1:55.823	+1.072	15
16	10	(France) Giuliano Alesi	Trident	1:55.909	+1.158	16
17	16	(Brazil) Bruno Baptista	DAMS	1:56.088	+1.337	17
18	28	(Argentina) Marcos Siebert	Campos Racing	1:56.485	+1.734	18
19	23	(United States) Juan Manuel Correa	Jenzer Motorsport	1:56.597	+1.846	19
20	26	(France) Julien Falchero	Campos Racing	1:57.015	+2.264	20

=== Feature Race ===
Pos.	No.	Driver	Team	Laps	Time/Retired	Grid	Points
1	5	(Finland) Niko Kari	Arden International	18	37:28.944	3	25 (2)
2	3	(United Kingdom) George Russell	ART Grand Prix	18	+2.748	1	18 (4)
3	24	(India) Arjun Maini	Jenzer Motorsport	18	+7.532	5	15
4	14	(United Kingdom) Dan Ticktum	DAMS	18	+13.745	4	12
5	22	(Italy) Alessio Lorandi	Jenzer Motorsport	18	+25.884	10	10
6	7	(Netherlands) Steijn Schothorst	Arden International	18	+29.890	11	8
7	12	(France) Dorian Boccolacci	Trident	18	+34.339	7	6
8	11	(United States) Ryan Tveter	Trident	18	+35.815	12	4
9	9	(Switzerland) Kevin Jörg	Trident	18	+36.374	14	2
10	16	(Brazil) Bruno Baptista	DAMS	18	+37.837	17	1
11	4	(France) Anthoine Hubert	ART Grand Prix	18	+40.003	9	
12	23	(United States) Juan Manuel Correa	Jenzer Motorsport	18	+41.362	19	
13	27	(South Africa) Raoul Hyman	Campos Racing	18	+50.566	8	
14	1	(United Kingdom) Jack Aitken	ART Grand Prix	18	+57.811	15	
15	2	(Japan) Nirei Fukuzumi	ART Grand Prix	18	+1:15.635	6	
16	15	(Colombia) Tatiana Calderon	DAMS	18	+1:20.614	13	
17	6	(Italy) Leonardo Pulcini	Arden International	16	DNF	2	
Ret	10	(France) Giuliano Alesi	Trident	9	DNF	16	
Ret	28	(Argentina) Marcos Siebert	Campos Racing	3	DNF	18	
DNS	26	(France) Julien Falchero	Campos Racing	0	Did not start	20	
Fastest lap: (Japan) Nirei Fukuzumi − ART Grand Prix − 1:57.544 (lap 18)

=== Sprint Race ===
Pos.	No.	Driver	Team	Laps	Time/Retired	Grid	Points
1	12	(France) Dorian Boccolacci	Trident	14	27:38.145	2	15
2	11	(United States) Ryan Tveter	Trident	14	+5.581	1	12
3	14	(United Kingdom) Dan Ticktum	DAMS	14	+8.510	5	10 (2)
4	3	(United Kingdom) George Russell	ART Grand Prix	14	+9.981	7	8
5	4	(France) Anthoine Hubert	ART Grand Prix	14	+13.169	11	6
6	24	(India) Arjun Maini	Jenzer Motorsport	14	+18.681	6	4
7	9	(Switzerland) Kevin Jörg	Trident	14	+19.557	9	2
8	1	(United Kingdom) Jack Aitken	ART Grand Prix	14	+20.745	14	1
9	10	(France) Giuliano Alesi	Trident	14	+22.389	18	
10	16	(Brazil) Bruno Baptista	DAMS	14	+23.501	10	
11	27	(South Africa) Raoul Hyman	Campos Racing	14	+23.946	13	
12	23	(United States) Juan Manuel Correa	Jenzer Motorsport	14	+26.766	12	
13	5	(Finland) Niko Kari	Arden International	14	+27.323	8	
14	2	(Japan) Nirei Fukuzumi	ART Grand Prix	14	+27.607	15	
15	15	(Colombia) Tatiana Calderon	DAMS	14	+28.814	16	
16	26	(France) Julien Falchero	Campos Racing	14	+31.359	20	
17	22	(Italy) Alessio Lorandi	Jenzer Motorsport	14	+1:17.433	4	
18	7	(Netherlands) Steijn Schothorst	Arden International	13	DNF	3	
Ret	28	(Argentina) Marcos Siebert	Campos Racing	1	DNF	19	
Ret	6	(Italy) Leonardo Pulcini	Arden International	0	DNF	17	
Fastest lap: (Japan) Nirei Fukuzumi − ART Grand Prix − 1:57.662 (lap 6)

== Championship standings after the round ==
Drivers' Championship standings

Pos.	Driver	Points
1	(United Kingdom) George Russell	220
2	(United Kingdom) Jack Aitken	141
3	(Japan) Nirei Fukuzumi	134
4	(France) Anthoine Hubert	123
5	(France) Giuliano Alesi	99

Teams' Championship standings

	Pos.	Team	Points
	1	(France) ART Grand Prix	590
	2	(Italy) Trident	285
	3	(Switzerland) Jenzer Motorsport	164
1	4	(United Kingdom) Arden International	91
1	5	(Spain) Campos Racing	56

- Note: Only the top five positions are included for both sets of standings.

== See also ==
- 2017 Abu Dhabi Grand Prix
- 2017 Yas Island Formula 2 round

== Notes ==
Previous round: 2017 Jerez GP3 Series round	GP3 Series; 2017 season	Next round: 2018 Barcelona GP3 Series round
Previous round: 2016 Yas Marina GP3 Series round	Yas Marina GP3 round	Next round: 2018 Yas Marina GP3 Series round
