= 2018 Barcelona GP3 Series round =

Motor racing competition

(Spain) 2018 Barcelona GP3 round
Round details
- Round 1 of 9 rounds in the 2018 GP3 Series
- Location: Circuit de Barcelona-Catalunya, Montmeló, Catalonia, Spain
- Course: Permanent racing facility 4.655 km (2.892 mi)

GP3 Series

Race 1
- Date: 12 May 2018
- Laps: 22

Pole position
Driver	(Italy) Leonardo Pulcini	Campos Racing
- Time: 1:32.258

Podium
First	(Russia) Nikita Mazepin	ART Grand Prix
Second	(United Kingdom) Anthoine Hubert	ART Grand Prix
Third	(United Kingdom) Callum Ilott	ART Grand Prix

Fastest lap
Driver	(France) Anthoine Hubert	ART Grand Prix
- Time: 1:33.846 (on lap 20)

Race 2
- Date: 13 May 2018
- Laps: 16

Podium
First	(France) Giuliano Alesi	Trident
Second	(France) Anthoine Hubert	ART Grand Prix
Third	(United Kingdom) Jake Hughes	ART Grand Prix

Fastest lap
Driver	(France) Giuliano Alesi	Trident
- Time: 1:44.511 (on lap 16)

The 2018 Barcelona GP3 Series round was a motor racing event held on 12 and 13 May 2018 at the Circuit de Barcelona-Catalunya in Montmeló, Catalonia, Spain. It was the opening round of the 2018 GP3 Series, and ran in support of the 2018 Spanish Grand Prix.

== Classification ==
=== Qualifying ===
Pos.	No.	Driver	Team	Time	Gap	Grid
1	18	(Italy) Leonardo Pulcini	Campos Racing	1:32.258		1
2	3	(Russia) Nikita Mazepin	ART Grand Prix	1:32.315	+0.057	2
3	2	(France) Anthoine Hubert	ART Grand Prix	1:32.405	+0.147	3
4	1	(United Kingdom) Callum Ilott	ART Grand Prix	1:32.550	+0.292	4
5	24	(Finland) Niko Kari	MP Motorsport	1:32.590	+0.342	5
6	22	(France) Dorian Boccolacci	MP Motorsport	1:32.606	+0.348	6
7	19	(Finland) Simo Laaksonen	Campos Racing	1:32.774	+0.516	7
8	11	(Germany) David Beckmann	Jenzer Motorsport	1:32.796	+0.538	8
9	8	(Italy) Alessio Lorandi	Trident	1:32.802	+0.544	9
10	6	(France) Giuliano Alesi	Trident	1:32.829	+0.571	10
11	4	(United Kingdom) Jake Hughes	ART Grand Prix	1:32.855	+0.597	11
12	10	(United States) Juan Manuel Correa	Jenzer Motorsport	1:32.894	+0.636	12
13	5	(Brazil) Pedro Piquet	Trident	1:32.953	+0.695	13
14	9	(Colombia) Tatiana Calderón	Jenzer Motorsport	1:32.955	+0.697	14
15	15	(France) Julien Falchero	Arden International	1:33.099	+0.841	15
16	20	(Mexico) Diego Menchaca	Campos Racing	1:33.135	+0.877	16
17	16	(Australia) Joey Mawson	Arden International	1:33.168	+0.910	17
18	14	(France) Gabriel Aubry	Arden International	1:33.252	+0.994	18
19	7	(United States) Ryan Tveter	Trident	1:33.665	+1.407	19
20	23	(United Kingdom) Will Palmer	MP Motorsport	1:33.710	+1.452	20

=== Feature race ===
Pos.	No.	Driver	Team	Laps	Time/Retired	Grid	Points
1	3	(Russia) Nikita Mazepin	ART Grand Prix	22	34:53.480	2	25
2	2	(France) Anthoine Hubert	ART Grand Prix	22	+3.649	3	18 (2)
3	1	(United Kingdom) Callum Ilott	ART Grand Prix	22	+7.143	4	15
4	18	(Italy) Leonardo Pulcini	Campos Racing	22	+8.032	1	12 (4)
5	22	(France) Dorian Boccolacci	MP Motorsport	22	+12.550	6	10
6	11	(Germany) David Beckmann	Jenzer Motorsport	22	+12.790	8	8
7	6	(France) Giuliano Alesi	Trident	22	+13.907	10	6
8	10	(United States) Juan Manuel Correa	Jenzer Motorsport	22	+19.443	12	4
9	5	(Brazil) Pedro Piquet	Trident	22	+22.797	13	2
10	20	(Mexico) Diego Menchaca	Campos Racing	22	+23.521	16	1
11	8	(Italy) Alessio Lorandi	Trident	22	+24.794	9	
12	14	(France) Gabriel Aubry	Arden International	22	+26.546	18	
13	4	(United Kingdom) Jake Hughes	ART Grand Prix	22	+34.328	11	
14	15	(France) Julien Falchero	Arden International	22	+34.484	15	
15	19	(Finland) Simo Laaksonen	Campos Racing	22	+36.628	7 (PL)	
16	16	(Australia) Joey Mawson	Arden International	22	+37.752	17	
17	7	(United States) Ryan Tveter	Trident	22	+37.937	19	
18	23	(United Kingdom) Will Palmer	MP Motorsport	22	+43.208	20	
DNF	9	(Colombia) Tatiana Calderón	Jenzer Motorsport	11	Mechanical	14	
DNF	24	(Finland) Niko Kari	MP Motorsport	0	Stalled	5	
Fastest lap: Anthoine Hubert − ART Grand Prix − 1:33.846 (on lap 20)

=== Sprint race ===
Pos.	No.	Driver	Team	Laps	Time/Retired	Grid	Points
1	6	(France) Giuliano Alesi	Trident	16	33:02.326	2	15 (2)
2	2	(France) Anthoine Hubert	ART Grand Prix	16	+2.077	7	12
3	4	(United Kingdom) Jake Hughes	ART Grand Prix	16	+2.376	13	10
4	10	(United States) Juan Manuel Correa	Jenzer Motorsport	16	+3.295	1	8
5	22	(France) Dorian Boccolacci	MP Motorsport	16	+3.593	4	6
6	24	(Finland) Niko Kari	MP Motorsport	16	+3.959	20	4
7	1	(United Kingdom) Callum Ilott	ART Grand Prix	16	+4.904	6	2
8	19	(Finland) Simo Laaksonen	Campos Racing	16	+5.544	15	1
9	18	(Italy) Leonardo Pulcini	Campos Racing	16	+6.103	5	
10	3	(Russia) Nikita Mazepin	ART Grand Prix	16	+6.667	8	
11	15	(France) Julien Falchero	Arden International	16	+8.855	14	
12	20	(Mexico) Diego Menchaca	Campos Racing	16	+12.369	10	
13	23	(United Kingdom) Will Palmer	MP Motorsport	16	+12.603	18	
14	7	(United States) Ryan Tveter	Trident	16	+12.641	17	
15	16	(Australia) Joey Mawson	Arden International	16	+14.812	16	
16	8	(Italy) Alessio Lorandi	Trident	16	+14.861	11	
17	11	(Germany) David Beckmann	Jenzer Motorsport	16	+47.346	4	
DNF	9	(Colombia) Tatiana Calderón	Jenzer Motorsport	12	Mechanical	19	
DNF	14	(France) Gabriel Aubry	Arden International	9	Collision damage	12	
DNF	5	(Brazil) Pedro Piquet	Trident	2	Accident	9	
Fastest lap: Giuliano Alesi − Trident − 1:44.511 (on lap 16)

== Standings after the event ==
Drivers' Championship standings

Pos.	Driver	Points
1	(France) Anthoine Hubert	32
2	(Russia) Nikita Mazepin	25
3	(France) Giuliano Alesi	23
4	(United Kingdom) Callum Ilott	17
5	(Italy) Leonardo Pulcini	16

Teams' Championship standings

Pos.	Team	Points
1	(France) ART Grand Prix	84
2	(Italy) Trident	25
3	(Switzerland) Jenzer Motorsport	20
4	(Netherlands) MP Motorsport	20
5	(Spain) Campos Racing	18

- Note: Only the top five positions are included for both sets of standings.

== See also ==
- 2018 Spanish Grand Prix
- 2018 Barcelona Formula 2 round

Previous round: 2017 Yas Marina GP3 Series round	GP3 Series; 2018 season	Next round: 2018 Le Castellet GP3 Series round
Previous round: 2017 Barcelona GP3 Series round	Barcelona GP3 round	Next round: 2019 Barcelona Formula 3 round
