= Anthoine Hubert =

French racing driver (1996–2019)

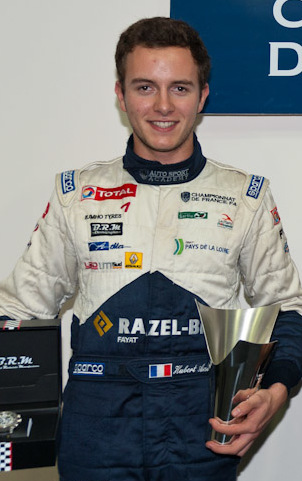
- Hubert in 2013
- Nationality: (France) French
- Born: Anthoine Gérard Pol Hubert; 22 September 1996 Lyon, France
- Died: 31 August 2019 (aged 22) Stavelot, Belgium

FIA Formula 2 Championship
- Years active: 2019
- Teams: BWT Arden
- Car number: 19 (retired in honour)
- Starts: 16
- Wins: 2
- Podiums: 2
- Poles: 2 (Note: 0 poles achieved during qualifying, and 2 poles given as a result of the reverse grid in the sprint race.)
- Fastest laps: 0
- Best finish: 10th in 2019

Previous series
- 2017–18 2016 2014–15 2014–15 2013: GP3 Series; FIA Formula 3 European Championship; Eurocup Formula Renault 2.0; Formula Renault 2.0 Alps; French F4 Championship

Championship titles
- 2018 2013: GP3 Series; French F4 Championship

Anthoine Gérard Pol Hubert (French pronunciation: [ɑ̃twan ybɛʁ]; 22 September 1996 – 31 August 2019) was a French professional racing driver. He was the 2018 GP3 Series champion and a member of the Renault Sport Academy. He died following an accident during the feature race of the 2019 Spa-Francorchamps Formula 2 round at the Circuit de Spa-Francorchamps.

== Career ==
=== Karting ===
Born in Lyon, Hubert began his karting career in 2004 at age eight. In 2010 he finished as runner-up in the CIK-FIA Karting Academy Trophy. In the 2011 and 2012 CIK-FIA "U18" World Karting Championships, he finished third.

=== Formula Renault ===
In 2013, Hubert moved up to single-seater racing, joining the French F4 Championship. He went on to win the series on his first attempt, finishing the season with eleven wins and two further podium finishes.

In 2014, Hubert graduated to competing in the Eurocup Formula Renault 2.0 with Tech 1 Racing. He finished fifteenth overall, with six point-scoring finishes throughout the season. He also participated in Formula Renault 2.0 Alps as guest driver.

For the 2015 season, Hubert remained in the Eurocup and with Tech 1. He finished fifth in the championship with wins at Silverstone and Le Mans and another five podiums to his name. He also contested selected events in the Alps series, where he won four of the six races that he started, and finished second in other two races.

=== FIA Formula 3 European Championship ===
In February 2016, it was confirmed that Hubert would make his debut in the European Formula 3 Championship, racing with Van Amersfoort Racing. He took his first Formula 3 win in the second race at Norisring. Hubert ended up eighth in the standings, three positions behind teammate Callum Ilott, but a long way ahead of his other two partners Harrison Newey and Pedro Piquet.

=== GP3 Series ===
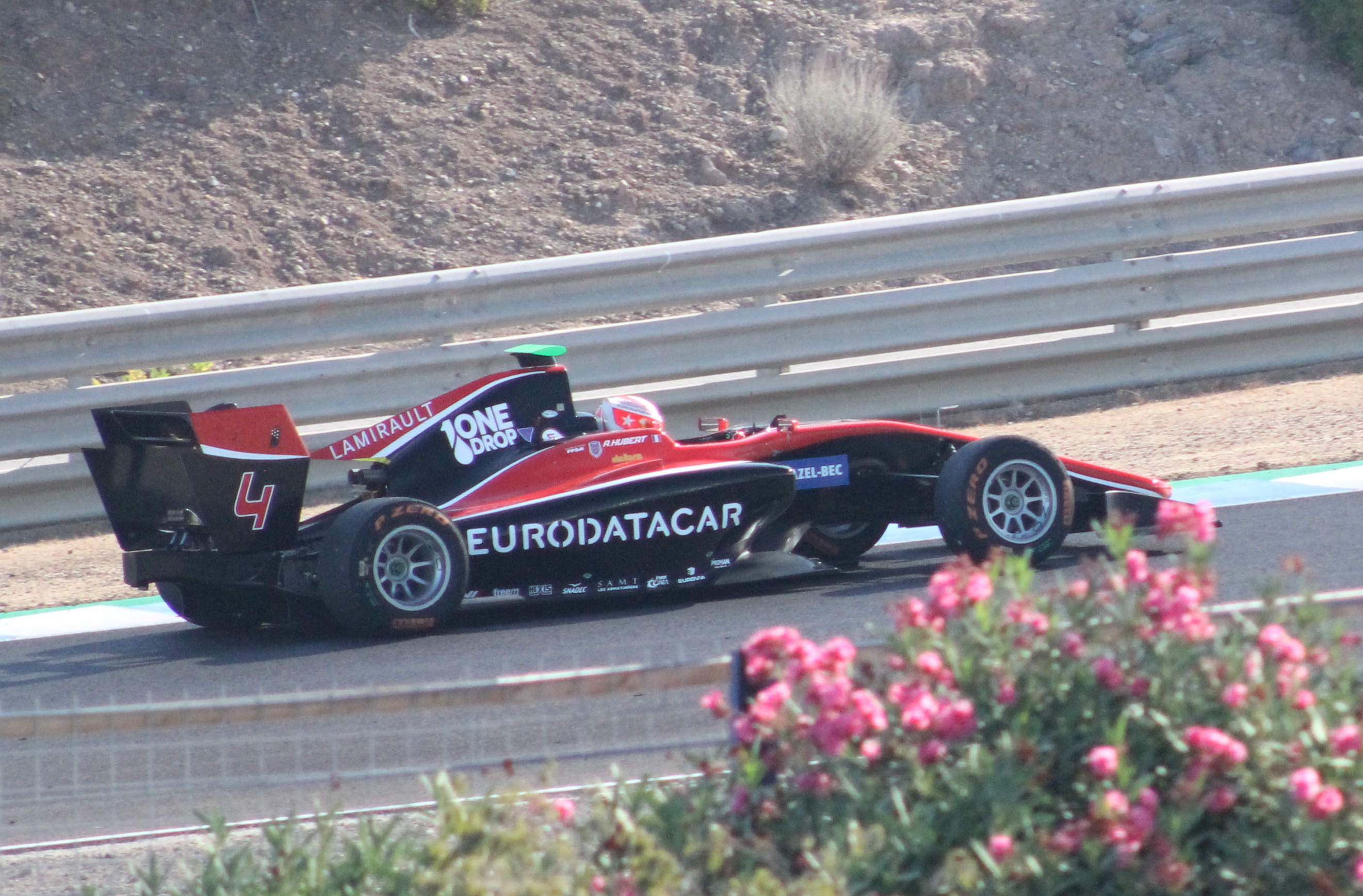
Hubert in Race 1 at the 2017 Jerez GP3 Series round

In November 2016, Hubert participated in F3 post-season testing with ART Grand Prix. In February 2017, he was recruited by ART to compete in the 2017 championship. He remained with them for the 2018 season. Despite only scoring two victories, two less than teammate Nikita Mazepin, the Frenchman won the title through his consistency, showcased by him finishing on the podium in eleven out of the 18 races. This led to him gaining reputation with Formula 1 teams such as Renault.

=== FIA Formula 2 Championship ===
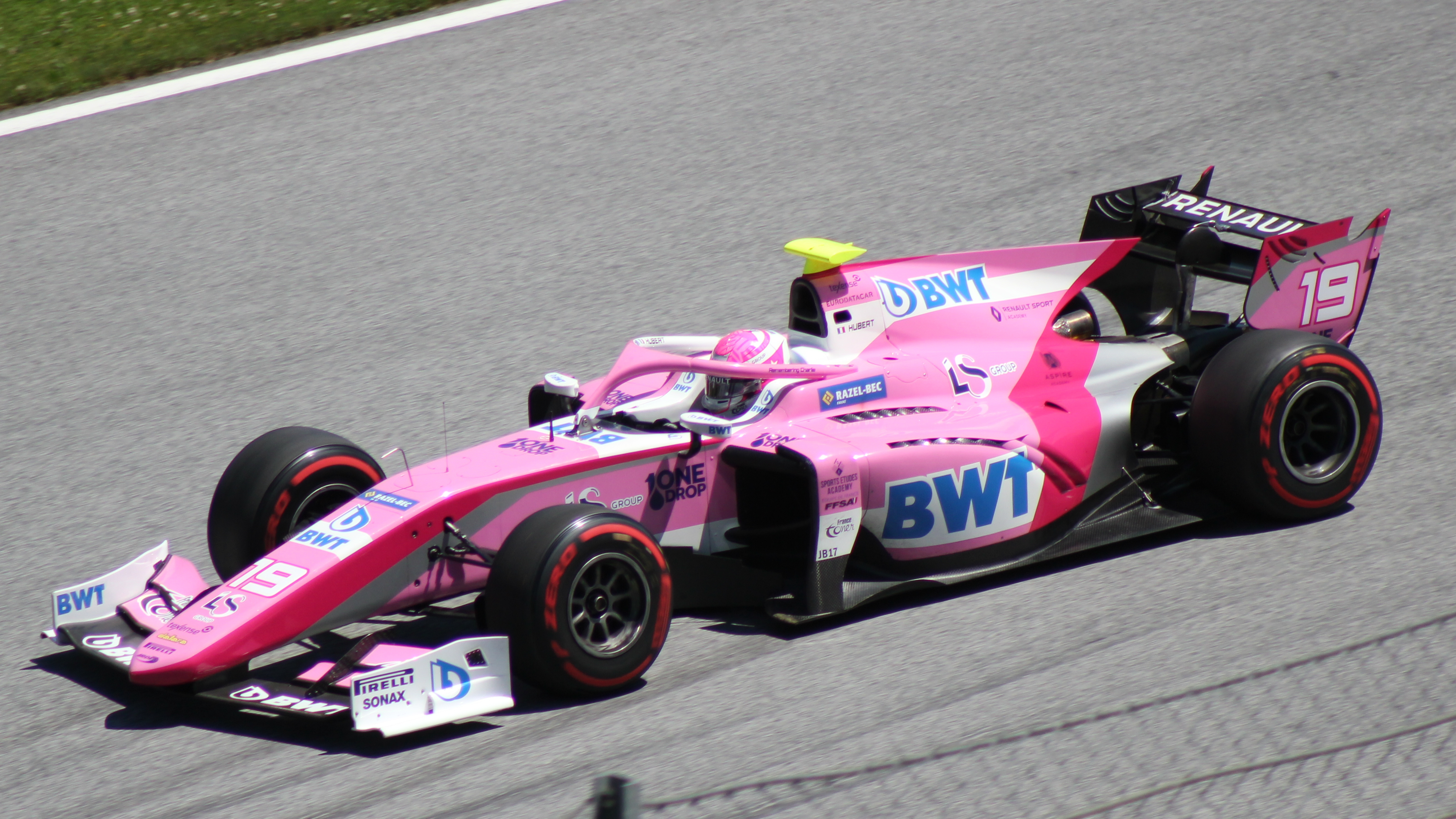
Hubert at the 2019 Spielberg Formula 2 round with BWT Arden

In November 2018, Hubert participated in the F2 post-season test at Abu Dhabi with MP Motorsport. In January 2019, Hubert joined F2 full-time racing with BWT Arden, partnering fellow GP3 graduate Tatiana Calderón. He took two wins in the first half of his debut season, at Monte Carlo and at his home race in France. Hubert's first F2 win, in Monaco, was just 0.059 seconds ahead of the second placed driver Louis Delétraz. The second and final win was in his home country, a race he started from pole position and finished ahead of Juan Manuel Correa. He scored points in seven further races that season and was seventh in the standings before the round at Spa-Francorchamps, he finally finished the season in tenth place in the F2 driver's championship.

=== Formula One ===
In May 2018, Hubert became an affiliated driver with the Renault Sport Academy. In 2019, Hubert received full backing from the Academy.

== Death ==
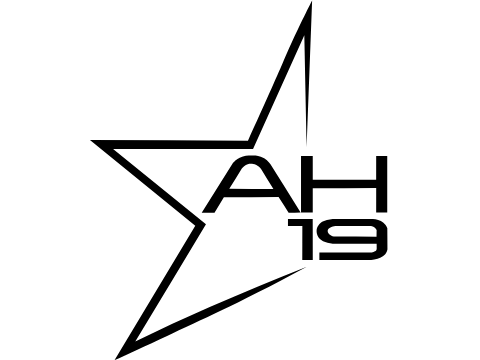
The insignia that appeared in memory of Hubert

On 31 August 2019, Hubert was critically injured when he was involved in a serious crash on the second lap of the feature race of the 2019 Spa-Francorchamps FIA Formula 2 round. As the second lap began, Trident driver Giuliano Alesi lost control of his car as he climbed the Raidillon curve, due to a puncture he had received earlier. This caused his car to spin and hit the left wall of the circuit, tearing off his rear wing and spreading debris onto the track. When another Trident driver, Ralph Boschung, reached the crest of Raidillon, he slowed down and moved towards the run-off area to avoid Alesi's damaged car and the field of debris. Hubert, who was closely following Boschung, could not see where Boschung was, and the speed difference between their two cars. Hubert moved right as well, clipping Boschung's right rear wheel with his front wing. He lost control of his car, crashed into the tyre barrier on the right side of the track at an acute angle, and was deflected sideways into the path of Charouz driver Juan Manuel Correa, who struck the left side of Hubert's car. Correa had lost control of his car due to hitting debris from Alesi's car, and was travelling at 218 km/h (135 mph) when he impacted Hubert's near-stationary car. Hubert's car experienced 82 g (800 m/s^{2}; 2,600 ft/s^{2}) as a result, while Correa was exposed to 65 g (640 m/s^{2}; 2,100 ft/s^{2}). Both cars were torn apart by the force of the accident. Hubert and Correa were transported to the circuit's medical centre following the accident, where Hubert died from his injuries. Hubert was pronounced dead approximately 90 minutes after the accident took place.

Correa was airlifted to Liège where he underwent surgery for fractures in both his legs and a minor spinal injury and was reported to be in a stable condition, having never lost consciousness after the impact, but one week later was placed in an induced coma. Alesi, the third driver in the accident, was unhurt. As a result of the accident, the feature race was not completed and the sprint race was cancelled out of respect.

Following his death, many drivers and teams in the motorsport world paid tribute to Hubert. On 1 September, a minute's silence was observed before the Formula 3 and Formula 1 races at Spa. Former F3 rival and Ferrari Formula One driver Charles Leclerc, who won his first career race that afternoon, dedicated his win to Hubert. A standing ovation took place on the 19th lap of the race, corresponding to the number 19 of his Formula 2 car. Before the start of the race, all racing safety vehicles, safety car, medical car, track inspection car, ambulance, car recovery vehicles, etc. made a lap of Circuit de Spa Francorchamps as a tribute to Hubert. All F1 cars had Hubert's car number inside a star and the words "Racing for Anthoine".

Hubert's funeral was on 10 September at Chartres Cathedral, Eure-et-Loir. It was attended by his family, friends and many people from the motorsport world, including Fédération Internationale de l'Automobile president Jean Todt, Renault F1 advisor and four-time champion Alain Prost, Charles Leclerc, Pierre Gasly, Esteban Ocon, and George Russell. Hubert's car number, 19, was later announced to have been permanently retired from use in Formula 2 with his replacement Artem Markelov running the #22 in place of the #19.

On the first anniversary of his death, many people in the F1 paddock went to the Raidillon tyre barrier (including close friend Gasly), where Hubert crashed to pay their respects. The F2 Feature race had a small remembrance graphic for Hubert on the upper right hand side of the broadcast (a half star with Hubert's initials and his number, AH19). Pierre Gasly wore a tribute helmet for the 2020 Belgian Grand Prix. All single seater race cars in Belgium during the F1 weekend had an AH19 remembrance sticker on them.

In 2024 leading up to the Belgian Grand Prix, Pierre Gasly again led the entire F1, F2 and F3 paddock for a jog from the start-finish line back up to the Raidillon tyre barrier where Hubert crashed to pay their respects. The corner was also the site of Dilano van 't Hoff's multi-car accident at the exit of the corner in 2023.

=== Investigation and recommendations ===
The Fédération Internationale de l'Automobile (FIA) launched an investigation into the accident. Findings of the accident investigation were presented to the World Motor Sport Council, together with recommended actions in December 2019. The FIA finished this investigation in February 2020.

The FIA stated that Hubert's cause of death was "non-survivable trauma". The FIA also gathers extensive medical data on drivers during the course of the race, however for privacy and ethical reasons, this data is not released to the public. F2 cars are built to the same safety standard as F1 cars; following the accident, Racing Point F1 Team technical boss Andy Green commented: "The energy involved was absolutely huge, and the current chassis design, whether F2 or F1, there's no way a current chassis can survive that sort of impact."

In May 2020, the FIA Safety Department issued the following safety recommendations which will be implemented in future generations of single seat cars (including F1, F2, F3, F4 and Formula E cars):

- Debris Containment - using "tethering" in order to prevent large pieces from falling off the car (used currently for keeping wheels attached to the chassis in case of an accident), the use of "tethers" may now be expanded to front and rear wings as well as other large components on the car. Correa struck pieces from Alesi's car (following Alesi's crash) causing Correa's car to become uncontrollable and strike Hubert's already disabled car. IndyCar began fielding "tethers" for non-wheel components in 2016.
- Increasing the frontal and side strength of the cockpit (also known as the "safety cell").
- Improving the car-to-car compatibility during a crash - the narrow nose section of Formula 2 cars can penetrate the side protection of another car. The current side protection consisting of two Side Impact Protection Structures (SIPS) and Side Anti Intrusion Panel will be redesigned. The lack of compatibility in car-to-car collisions was also noticed in a crash in the 2017 F4 British Championship that left Billy Monger a double-amputee after a piece of the car crash protection structure (designed to protect the driver when colliding with a wall) caused unnecessarily serious injuries if struck by another car. Correa impacted Hubert at a speed of 218 km/h, experienced 65G and suffered much more serious injuries than Robert Kubica did in his crash at the 2007 Canadian Grand Prix (acute respiratory distress syndrome, broken legs, spinal injury vs. Kubica's sprained ankle). Kubica struck the wall at 230 km/h and experienced 75G (both higher than Correa).
- Front wing redesign - increase the robustness of the front wing by introducing “controlled failure” points which should reduce the chance that the entire front wing is destroyed in case of minor contact with another car, as this caused Hubert's car to crash into the barriers and become immobilised; additionally, the loss of the entire front wing also caused Correa to lose control of his car which ultimately resulted in the fatal car-to-car crash between them.
- Headrest redesign (also known as cockpit surround padding) - ensuring that all or at least part of the headrest remains in place in case of a heavy crash. The same problem was already observed during Kevin Magnussen's crash at the 2016 Belgian Grand Prix.
- Quicker Accident Notification System - for example using the existing rain light to flash in different colours (e.g. yellow to indicate yellow flag conditions on the track or red (to indicate that the race has been stopped)). Possible introduction of car to car communication, i.e. notifications of stationary car(s) on the track.
- Tyre Pressure Monitoring System Deployment - crash sequence began with Alesi losing control due to a tyre puncture which he was unaware of before he lost control.

In October 2020, it was announced that the Raidillon corner would be modified by expanding the run-off area and reintroducing gravel traps. Upgrades were completed in early 2022 but gravel at Raidillon de l'Eau Rouge was not part of the package.

== Legacy ==
At the FIA Formula 2 Championship prize-giving ceremony in Monaco in 2019 the Anthoine Hubert Award was introduced. It is named after Hubert who was the only rookie in the season to score two wins. The award is given to the highest-placed driver without previous Formula 2 experience. The inaugural recipient of the Anthoine Hubert Award was Zhou Guanyu. Hubert is remembered in the racing game F1 2020, where he is a selectable driver.

== Karting record ==
=== Karting career summary ===
Season	Series	Team	Position
2005	Championnat de France Regional Ile de France — Mini Kart		2nd
2005	Coupe de France — Mini Kart		1st
2006	Championnat de France — Minime		13th
2007	Championnat de France — Minime		10th
2008	Bridgestone Cup — Cadet		?
2008	Championnat de France — Cadet		2nd
2009	Trophée de France — Cadet		1st
2009	Bridgestone Cup — Cadet		6th
2009	Championnat de France — KF3		11th
2009	Grand Prix Open Karting — KF3		11th
2009	WSK International Series — KF3		134th
2010	South Garda Winter Cup — KF3	Tony Kart	9th
2010	WSK Euro Series — KF3	Tony Kart	13th
2010	CIK-FIA Karting European Championship — KF3	Tony Kart	28th
2010	CIK-FIA World Cup — KF3	Tony Kart	16th
2010	CIK-FIA Academy Trophy		2nd
2010	Monaco Kart Cup — KF3		6th
2010	Grand Prix Open Karting — KF3		3rd
2011	Rotax Euro Challenge — Rotax Senior		67th
2011	WSK Euro Series — KF1	Sodi Racing Team	21st
2011	Championnat de France — KF2	Braun Racing	6th
2011	CIK-FIA World Championship — KF1	Sodikart	14th
2011	Grand Prix Open Karting — KF2		6th
2011	CIK-FIA World Karting Championship — U18	De Cola, Nicolas	3rd
2011	ERDF Masters Kart — Junior		3rd
2012	South Garda Winter Cup — KF2	Formula K	10th
2012	WSK Master Series — KF2	Formula K	32nd
2012	CIK-FIA World Karting Championship — KF1	Formula K	18th
2012	WSK Euro Series — KF2	Formula K	18th
2012	CIK-FIA Karting European Championship — KF2	Formula K	13th
2012	CIK-FIA World Cup — KF2	Formula K	15th
2012	Grand Prix Open Karting — KF2		14th
2012	CIK-FIA World Karting Championship — U18	Hubert, Francois	3rd

== Racing record ==
=== Racing career summary ===
Season	Series	Team	Races	Wins	Poles	F/Laps	Podiums	Points	Position
2013	French F4 Championship	Auto Sport Academy	21	11	10	8	13	365	**1st**
2014	Eurocup Formula Renault 2.0	Tech 1 Racing	14	0	0	0	0	30	15th
2014	Formula Renault 2.0 Alps	Tech 1 Racing	6	0	0	0	0	N/A	NC†
2015	Eurocup Formula Renault 2.0	Tech 1 Racing	17	2	2	2	7	172	5th
2015	Formula Renault 2.0 Alps	Tech 1 Racing	6	4	4	3	6	N/A	NC†
2016	FIA Formula 3 European Championship	Van Amersfoort Racing	30	1	1	1	3	160	8th
2016	Masters of Formula 3	Van Amersfoort Racing	1	0	0	0	0	N/A	7th
2016	Macau Grand Prix	Van Amersfoort Racing	1	0	0	0	0	N/A	13th
2017	GP3 Series	ART Grand Prix	15	0	0	4	4	123	4th
2018	GP3 Series	ART Grand Prix	18	2	2	4	11	214	**1st**
2019	FIA Formula 2 Championship	BWT Arden	16	2	0	0	2	77	10th

^{†} As Hubert was a guest driver, he was ineligible for championship points.

=== Complete French F4 Championship results ===
(key) (Races in bold indicate pole position) (Races in italics indicate fastest lap)

Year	Entrant	1	2	3	4	5	6	7	8	9	10	11	12	13	14	15	16	17	18	19	20	21	DC	Points
2013	Autosport Academy	**LMS**; **1**; 1	LMS; 2; 5	LMS; 3; 1	**PAU**; **1**; 1	PAU; 2; 5	**PAU**; **3**; 1	**SPA**; **1**; 1	SPA; 2; 1	**SPA**; **3**; 1	**VDV**; **1**; 1	VDV; 2 Ret	**VDV**; **3**; 1	MAG; 1; 4	MAG; 2; 11	MAG; 3; 2	**LÉD**; **1**; 11	LÉD; 2; 4	LÉD; 3; 3	**LEC**; **1**; 1	LEC; 2 Ret	**LEC**; **3**; 1	1st	365

=== Complete Eurocup Formula Renault 2.0 results ===
(key) (Races in bold indicate pole position) (Races in italics indicate fastest lap)

Year	Entrant	1	2	3	4	5	6	7	8	9	10	11	12	13	14	15	16	17	Pos	Points
2014	Tech 1 Racing	ALC; 1; 18	ALC; 2; 7	SPA; 1; 9	SPA; 2; 6	SIL; 1; 10	SIL; 2; 13	NÜR; 1; 19	NÜR; 2; 15	HUN; 1; 14	HUN; 2; 16	LEC; 1; 12	LEC; 2; 9	JER; 1; 6	JER; 2; 16				15th	30
2015	Tech 1 Racing	ALC; 1; 3	ALC; 2; 6	ALC; 3; 2	SPA; 1; 3	SPA; 2; 6	HUN; 1 Ret	HUN; 2; 6	SIL; 1; 14	SIL; 2; 9	**SIL**; **3**; 1	NÜR; 1; 11	NÜR; 2; 3	LMS; 1; 6	**LMS**; **2**; 1	JER; 1; 7	JER; 2 Ret	JER; 3; 2	5th	172

=== Complete Formula Renault 2.0 Alps Series results ===
(key) (Races in bold indicate pole position; races in italics indicate fastest lap)

Year	Team	1	2	3	4	5	6	7	8	9	10	11	12	13	14	15	16	Pos	Points
2014	Tech 1 Racing	IMO; 1; 10	IMO; 2; 10	PAU; 1	PAU; 2	RBR; 1	RBR; 2	SPA; 1	SPA; 2	MNZ; 1	MNZ; 2	MUG; 1; 6	MUG; 2; 9	JER; 1; 11	JER; 2 Ret			NC†	0
2015	Tech 1 Racing	**IMO**; **1**; 1	IMO; 2; 2	**PAU**; **1**; 1	**PAU**; **2**; 1	RBR; 1	RBR; 2	RBR; 3	SPA; 1	SPA; 2	MNZ; 1	MNZ; 2	MNZ; 3	MIS; 1	MIS; 2	**JER**; **1**; 1	JER; 2; 2	NC†	0

† As Hubert was a guest driver, he was ineligible for points

=== Complete FIA Formula 3 European Championship results ===
(key) (Races in bold indicate pole position) (Races in italics indicate fastest lap)

Year	Entrant	Engine	1	2	3	4	5	6	7	8	9	10	11	12	13	14	15	16	17	18	19	20	21	22	23	24	25	26	27	28	29	30	DC	Points
2016	Van Amersfoort Racing	Mercedes	LEC; 1; 17	LEC; 2; 8	LEC; 3; 6	HUN; 1 Ret	HUN; 2; 13	HUN; 3; 14	PAU; 1; 12	PAU; 2; 7	PAU; 3; 12	RBR; 1; 16	RBR; 2; 10	RBR; 3; 16	NOR; 1; 8	**NOR**; **2**; 1	NOR; 3; 2	ZAN; 1; 9	ZAN; 2; 4	ZAN; 3; 10	SPA; 1 Ret	SPA; 2; 4	SPA; 3; 2	NÜR; 1; 10	NÜR; 2; 5	NÜR; 3; 9	IMO; 1; 5	IMO; 2; 6	IMO; 3; 6	HOC; 1; 10	HOC; 2; 7	HOC; 3; 10	8th	160

=== Complete Macau Grand Prix results ===
Year	Team	Car	Qualifying	Quali Race	Main race
2016	(Netherlands) Van Amersfoort Racing	Dallara F312	14th	DNF	13th

=== Complete GP3 Series results ===
(key) (Races in bold indicate pole position) (Races in italics indicate fastest lap)

Year	Entrant	1	2	3	4	5	6	7	8	9	10	11	12	13	14	15	16	17	18	Pos	Points	Ref
2017	ART Grand Prix	CAT; FEA; 5	CAT; SPR; 4	RBR; FEA; 4	RBR; SPR; 7	SIL; FEA; 2	SIL; SPR; 8	HUN; FEA; 3	HUN; SPR; 5	SPA; FEA; Ret	SPA; SPR; 7	MNZ; FEA; 3	MNZ; SPR; C	JER; FEA; 5	JER; SPR; 3	YMC; FEA; 11	YMC; SPR; 5			4th	123	
2018	ART Grand Prix	CAT; FEA; 2	CAT; SPR; 2	LEC; FEA; 1	LEC; SPR; 7	RBR; FEA; 17	RBR; SPR; 9	**SIL**; **FEA**; 1	SIL; SPR; 4	**HUN**; **FEA**; 3	HUN; SPR; 3	SPA; FEA; 3	SPA; SPR; 2	MNZ; FEA; 2	MNZ; SPR; DSQ	SOC; FEA; 3	SOC; SPR; 4	YMC; FEA; 3	YMC; SPR; Ret	1st	214	

=== Complete FIA Formula 2 Championship results ===
(key) (Races in bold indicate pole position) (Races in italics indicate points for the fastest lap of top ten finishers)

Year	Entrant	1	2	3	4	5	6	7	8	9	10	11	12	13	14	15	16	17	18	19	20	21	22	23	24	DC	Points	Ref
2019	BWT Arden	BHR; FEA; 4	BHR; SPR; 9	BAK; FEA; 10	BAK; SPR; 11	CAT; FEA; 6	CAT; SPR; 5	MON; FEA; 8	MON; SPR; 1	LEC; FEA; 8	LEC; SPR; 1	RBR; FEA; 4	RBR; SPR; 17	SIL; FEA; 18	SIL; SPR; 11	HUN; FEA; 11	HUN; SPR; 11	SPA; FEA; C	SPA; SPR; C	MNZ; FEA	MNZ; SPR	SOC; FEA	SOC; SPR	YMC; FEA	YMC; SPR	10th	77	

== Notes ==
Sporting positions
Preceded by Alexandre Baron	French F4 Championship; Champion; 2013	Succeeded by Lasse Sørensen
Preceded by George Russell	GP3 Series; Champion; 2018	Succeeded by Robert Shwartzman (FIA Formula 3 Championship)
