= 2017 GP3 Series =

Season of motor racing competitions

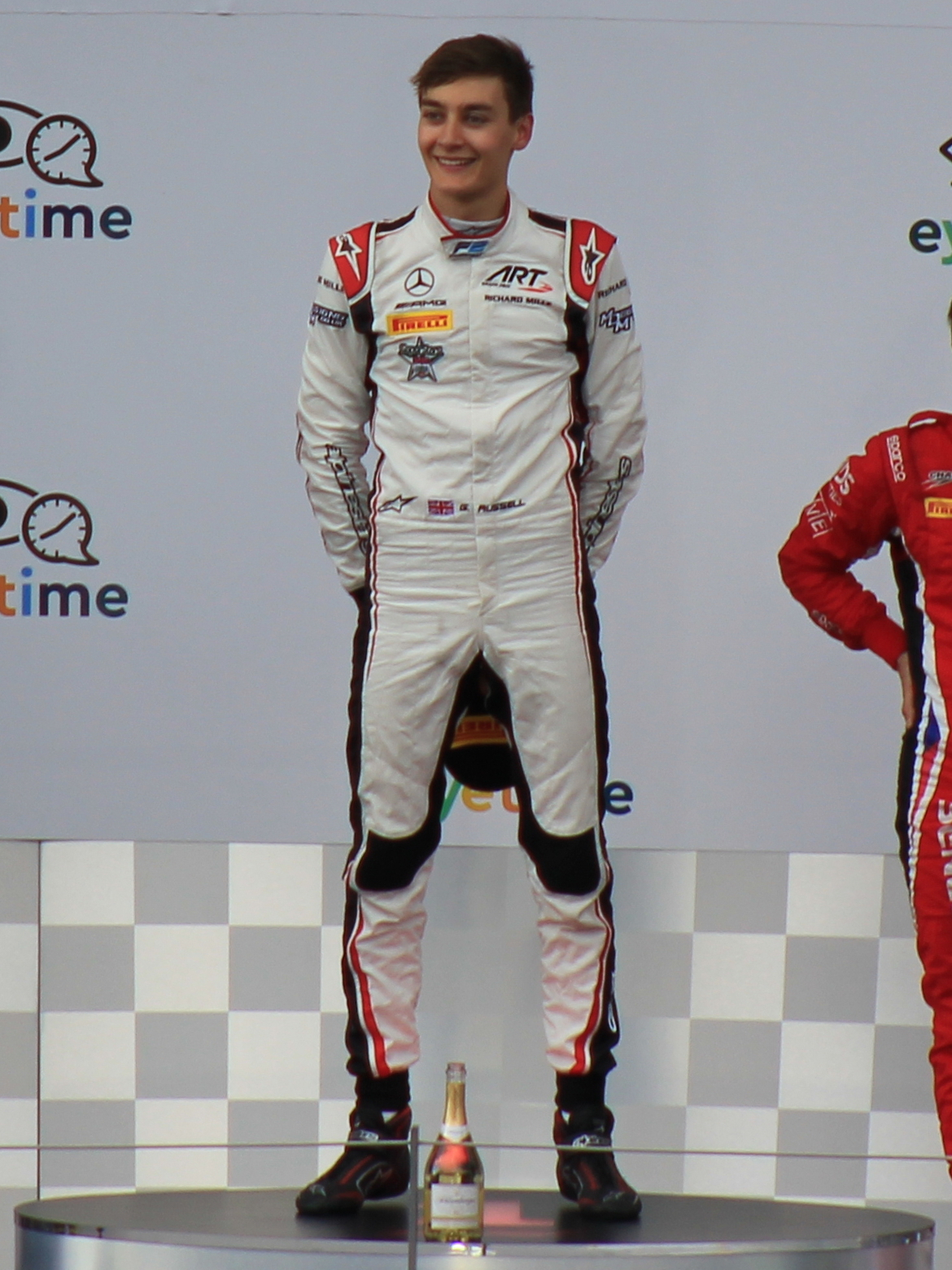
George Russell (pictured in 2018), the series champion.

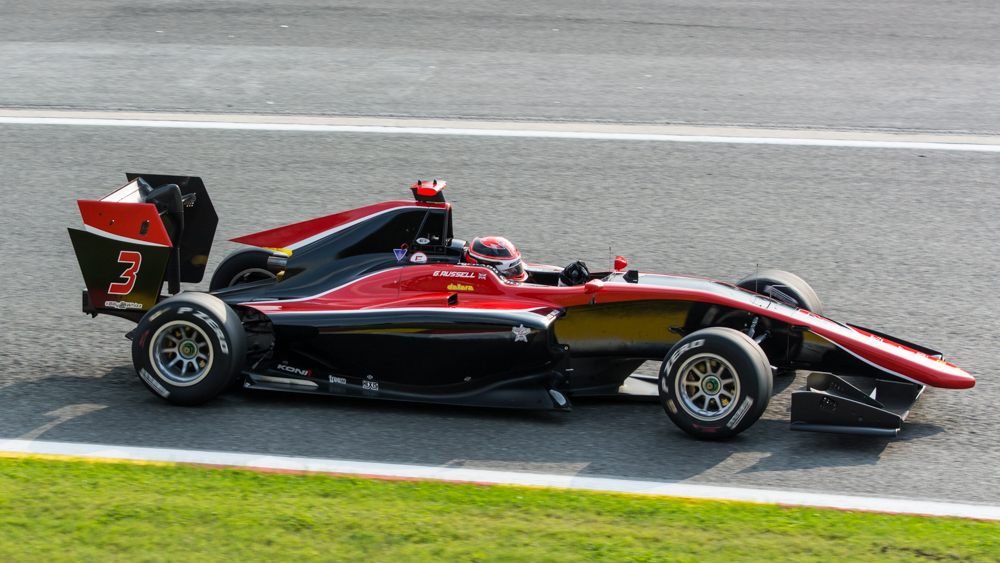
ART Grand Prix won their seventh teams' championship title.

The 2017 GP3 Series was the eighth season of the third-tier of Formula One feeder championship and also eighth season under the moniker of GP3 Series, a motor racing feeder series that runs in support of the 2017 FIA Formula One World Championship and sister series Formula 2.

George Russell won the drivers' championship. In the teams' championship, defending champions ART Grand Prix secured their seventh GP3 Series title. Trident Racing were second ahead of Jenzer Motorsport.

Champion George Russell took 4 wins, Giuliano Alesi got 3 sprint race wins., Nirei Fukuzumi won 2 races during the season, and Dorian Boccolacci, Arjun Maini, Raoul Hyman, Jack Aitken, Alessio Lorandi, and Niko Kari all took 1 win each. ART Grand Prix won all feature races, except the last race, which was won by Arden International.

== Teams and drivers ==
All GP3 drivers competed in a Dallara GP3/16 chassis, using a Mecachrome GP3 V6 engine and Pirelli P Zero and Cinturato tyres.

Team	No.	Driver name	Rounds
(France) ART Grand Prix	1	(United Kingdom) Jack Aitken	All
(France) ART Grand Prix	2	(Japan) Nirei Fukuzumi	All
(France) ART Grand Prix	3	(United Kingdom) George Russell	All
(France) ART Grand Prix	4	(France) Anthoine Hubert	All
(United Kingdom) Arden International	5	(Finland) Niko Kari	All
(United Kingdom) Arden International	6	(Italy) Leonardo Pulcini	All
(United Kingdom) Arden International	7	(Netherlands) Steijn Schothorst	All
(Italy) Trident	9	(Switzerland) Kevin Jörg	All
(Italy) Trident	10	(France) Giuliano Alesi	All
(Italy) Trident	11	(United States) Ryan Tveter	All
(Italy) Trident	12	(France) Dorian Boccolacci	All
(France) DAMS	14	(United States) Santino Ferrucci	1–3
(France) DAMS	14	(France) Matthieu Vaxivière	4–5
(France) DAMS	14	(United Kingdom) Dan Ticktum	6–8
(France) DAMS	15	(Colombia) Tatiana Calderón	All
(France) DAMS	16	(Brazil) Bruno Baptista	All
(Switzerland) Jenzer Motorsport	22	(Italy) Alessio Lorandi	All
(Switzerland) Jenzer Motorsport	23	(Italy) Juan Manuel Correa (Note: Correa is an American driver who raced under Italian racing license.)	5–8
(Switzerland) Jenzer Motorsport	24	(India) Arjun Maini	All
(Spain) Campos Racing	26	(France) Julien Falchero	All
(Spain) Campos Racing	27	(South Africa) Raoul Hyman	All
(Spain) Campos Racing	28	(Argentina) Marcos Siebert	All

=== Driver changes ===
Changing teams

- Renault Sport Academy member Jack Aitken switched from Arden International to ART Grand Prix.
- Tatiana Calderón moved from Arden International to DAMS.
- Kevin Jörg switched from DAMS to Trident.
- Steijn Schothorst, who raced for Campos Racing switched to Arden International.

Joining GP3

- Bruno Baptista, who raced in Eurocup Formula Renault 2.0 stepped up to GP3 Series with DAMS.
- 2016 Eurocup Formula Renault 2.0 runner-up Dorian Boccolacci joined the series with Trident.
- Julien Falchero graduated from Eurocup Formula Renault 2.0, joining Campos Racing.
- Red Bull Junior driver Niko Kari, who finished tenth in the 2016 European Formula 3 season and contested in the Spa round of the 2016 season with Koiranen GP, competing in the series full-time with Arden International.
- 2016 Euroformula Open Champion Leonardo Pulcini, graduated with Arden International.
- Anthoine Hubert and Mercedes F1 junior driver George Russell, who finished eighth and third in the 2016 European Formula 3 season respectively, joined the series with ART Grand Prix.
- 2016 Italian F4 Champion Marcos Siebert moved to the series with Campos Racing.
- European Formula 3 racers Ryan Tveter and Raoul Hyman joined the series with Trident and Campos Racing respectively.

Leaving GP3

- Arden International driver Jake Dennis left the series after the 2016 season, to compete in Blancpain GT Series.
- 2016 champion Charles Leclerc and Antonio Fuoco graduated to the FIA Formula 2 Championship with Prema Racing.
- DAMS driver Jake Hughes left the series to race in European Formula 3 with Hitech GP.
- Matevos Isaakyan, who raced with Koiranen GP concentrated on World Series Formula V8 3.5 campaign, joining AVF.
- Campos Racing drivers Álex Palou and Konstantin Tereshchenko left the series, to participate in All-Japan Formula Three Championship with ThreeBond Drago Corse and World Series Formula V8 3.5 with Teo Martín Motorsport respectively.

Midseason changes

- Matthieu Vaxivière joined DAMS from the Hungaroring round, replacing Santino Ferrucci, who was promoted to the 2017 FIA Formula 2 Championship with Trident.
- Juan Manuel Correa took seat in Jenzer Motorsport at Spa, making his GP3 Series debut.
- Red Bull Junior Dan Ticktum joined DAMS for the Monza round, replacing Vaxivière.

=== Team changes ===
- After having competed in the series since 2013, Koiranen GP left the series.

== Calendar ==
On 27 January 2017, the full calendar was revealed with eight rounds taking place.

Round	Circuit/Location	Date	Supporting
1	(Spain) Circuit de Barcelona-Catalunya, Barcelona	13–14 May	Spanish Grand Prix
2	(Austria) Red Bull Ring, Spielberg	8–9 July	Austrian Grand Prix
3	(United Kingdom) Silverstone Circuit, Silverstone	15–16 July	British Grand Prix
4	(Hungary) Hungaroring, Budapest	29–30 July	Hungarian Grand Prix
5	(Belgium) Circuit de Spa-Francorchamps, Francorchamps	26–27 August	Belgian Grand Prix
6	(Italy) Autodromo Nazionale Monza, Monza	2–3 September	Italian Grand Prix
7	(Spain) Circuito de Jerez, Jerez de la Frontera	7–8 October	FIA Formula 2 Jerez round
8	(United Arab Emirates) Yas Marina Circuit, Abu Dhabi	25-26 November	Abu Dhabi Grand Prix

=== Calendar changes ===
- The series will make its début at the Circuito de Jerez, with a stand-alone event planned as the penultimate round of the season.
- The Hockenheim and Sepang round were removed from the calendar.

=== Race by Race ===
Round 1: Spain

Jack Aitken became the first polesitter of the 2017 season and Dorian Boccolacci qualified third on his first GP3 race.

== Rule changes ==
- The series will introduce the use of the drag reduction system (DRS), an overtaking aid that cancels out aerodynamic drag and allowing drivers to achieve a higher top speed when within one second of the car in front at designated points on the circuit. Further restrictions will be placed on the use of DRS, with drivers only able to use it a limited number of times in each race.

== Results ==
=== Season summary ===
Round		Circuit	Pole position	Fastest lap	Winning driver	Winning team	Report
1	R1	(Spain) Circuit de Barcelona-Catalunya	(United Kingdom) Jack Aitken	(France) Anthoine Hubert	(Japan) Nirei Fukuzumi	(France) ART Grand Prix	Report
1	R2	(Spain) Circuit de Barcelona-Catalunya		(Italy) Leonardo Pulcini (Note: Leonardo Pulcini set the fastest lap, but did not finish in the top 10, so was ineligible to be the point-scorer for the fastest lap. George Russell was the point-scorer instead for setting the fastest lap of those finishing in the top 10.)	(India) Arjun Maini	(Switzerland) Jenzer Motorsport	Report
2	R1	(Austria) Red Bull Ring	(United Kingdom) George Russell	(France) Anthoine Hubert	(United Kingdom) George Russell	(France) ART Grand Prix	Report
2	R2	(Austria) Red Bull Ring		(India) Arjun Maini (Note: Arjun Maini set the fastest lap, but did not finish in the top 10, so was ineligible to be the point-scorer for the fastest lap. Anthoine Hubert was the point-scorer instead for setting the fastest lap of those finishing in the top 10.)	(South Africa) Raoul Hyman	(Spain) Campos Racing	Report
3	R1	(United Kingdom) Silverstone Circuit	(United Kingdom) George Russell	(France) Giuliano Alesi	(United Kingdom) George Russell	(France) ART Grand Prix	Report
3	R2	(United Kingdom) Silverstone Circuit		(United Kingdom) George Russell	(France) Giuliano Alesi	(Italy) Trident	Report
4	R1	(Hungary) Hungaroring	(United Kingdom) Jack Aitken	(United Kingdom) Jack Aitken	(United Kingdom) Jack Aitken	(France) ART Grand Prix	Report
4	R2	(Hungary) Hungaroring		(United Kingdom) George Russell (Note: George Russell set the fastest lap, but did not finish in the top 10, so was ineligible to be the point-scorer for the fastest lap. Leonardo Pulcini was the point-scorer instead for setting the fastest lap of those finishing in the top 10.)	(France) Giuliano Alesi	(Italy) Trident	Report
5	R1	(Belgium) Circuit de Spa-Francorchamps	(United Kingdom) George Russell	(United Kingdom) George Russell	(United Kingdom) George Russell	(France) ART Grand Prix	Report
5	R2	(Belgium) Circuit de Spa-Francorchamps		(United Kingdom) George Russell	(France) Giuliano Alesi	(Italy) Trident	Report
6	R1	(Italy) Autodromo Nazionale Monza	(Japan) Nirei Fukuzumi (Note: Heavy rains forced the cancellation of qualifying. Nirei Fukuzumi was credited with pole position as he had set the fastest lap time during free practice, but did not start of race.)	(France) Anthoine Hubert	(United Kingdom) George Russell	(France) ART Grand Prix	Report
6	R2	(Italy) Autodromo Nazionale Monza	Race cancelled (Note: Heavy rain forced the rescheduling of race 1 to the original spot of race 2, leaving no time for race 2 to take place.)				Report
7	R1	(Spain) Circuito de Jerez	(Japan) Nirei Fukuzumi	(South Africa) Raoul Hyman (Note: Raoul Hyman set the fastest lap, but did not finish in the top 10, so was ineligible to be the point-scorer for the fastest lap. Jack Aitken was the point-scorer instead for setting the fastest lap of those finishing in the top 10.)	(Japan) Nirei Fukuzumi	(France) ART Grand Prix	Report
7	R2	(Spain) Circuito de Jerez		(United Kingdom) George Russell	(Italy) Alessio Lorandi	(Switzerland) Jenzer Motorsport	Report
8	R1	(United Arab Emirates) Yas Marina Circuit	(United Kingdom) George Russell	(Japan) Nirei Fukuzumi (Note: Nirei Fukuzumi set the fastest lap, but did not finish in the top 10, so was ineligible to be the point-scorer for the fastest lap. Niko Kari was the point-scorer instead for setting the fastest lap of those finishing in the top 10.)	(Finland) Niko Kari	(United Kingdom) Arden International	Report
8	R2	(United Arab Emirates) Yas Marina Circuit		(Japan) Nirei Fukuzumi (Note: Nirei Fukuzumi set the fastest lap, but did not finish in the top 10, so was ineligible to be the point-scorer for the fastest lap. Dan Ticktum was the point-scorer instead for setting the fastest lap of those finishing in the top 10.)	(France) Dorian Boccolacci	(Italy) Trident	Report

== Championship standings ==
=== Scoring system ===
Points were awarded to the top 10 classified finishers in the race 1, and to the top 8 classified finishers in the race 2. The pole-sitter in the race 1 also received four points, and two points were given to the driver who set the fastest lap inside the top ten in both the race 1 and race 2. No extra points were awarded to the pole-sitter in the race 2.

Race 1 points

Position	**1st**	**2nd**	**3rd**	**4th**	**5th**	**6th**	**7th**	**8th**	**9th**	**10th**	**Pole**	**FL**
Points	25	18	15	12	10	8	6	4	2	1	4	2

Race 2 points

Points were awarded to the top 8 classified finishers.

Position	**1st**	**2nd**	**3rd**	**4th**	**5th**	**6th**	**7th**	**8th**	**FL**
Points	15	12	10	8	6	4	2	1	2

=== Drivers' championship ===
Pos.	Driver	CAT (Spain)		RBR (Austria)		SIL (United Kingdom)		HUN (Hungary)		SPA (Belgium)		MNZ (Italy)		JER (Spain)		YMC (United Arab Emirates)		Points
Pos.	Driver	R1	R2	R1	R2	R1	R2	R1	R2	R1	R2	R1	R2	R1	R2	R1	R2	Points
1	(United Kingdom) George Russell	4	5	**1**	6	**1**	4	DNS	11	**1**	2	1	C	2	4	**2**	4	220
2	(United Kingdom) Jack Aitken	**Ret**	12	2	5	4	2	**1**	Ret	2	18	2	C	3	6	14	8	141
3	(Japan) Nirei Fukuzumi	1	6	3	3	Ret	16	2	Ret	3	4	**DNS**	C	**1**	5	15	14	134
4	(France) Anthoine Hubert	5	4	4	7	2	8	3	5	Ret	7	3	C	5	3	11	5	123
5	(France) Giuliano Alesi	17	11	6	2	7	1	6	1	7	1	6	C	9	7	Ret	10	99
6	(France) Dorian Boccolacci	6	2	9	17†	8	Ret	5	4	5	17	14	C	7	2	7	1	93
7	(Italy) Alessio Lorandi	3	3	7	8	3	6	4	Ret	12	14	Ret	C	8	1	5	17	92
8	(United States) Ryan Tveter	12	18	5	4	Ret	13	8	2	6	3	5	C	12	14	8	2	78
9	(India) Arjun Maini	7	1	10	16	6	5	Ret	8	4	6	16†	C	17	12	3	6	72
10	(Finland) Niko Kari	15	14	Ret	18	5	3	9	6	9	9	15†	C	6	19	1	13	63
11	(United Kingdom) Dan Ticktum											13	C	4	Ret	4	3	36
12	(Switzerland) Kevin Jörg	13	9	11	9	9	7	7	3	10	8	9	C	20	18	9	7	28
13	(South Africa) Raoul Hyman	8	7	8	1	16	11	14	7	14	10	11	C	19	15	13	11	27
14	(Italy) Leonardo Pulcini	2	17	Ret	14	11	12	15	10	11	11	Ret	C	14	13	17†	Ret	20
15	(France) Julien Falchero	11	10	15	11	10	Ret	13	Ret	8	5	8	C	10	9	DNS	16	16
16	(Argentina) Marcos Siebert	10	16	12	10	12	10	11	9	Ret	Ret	4	C	18	17	Ret	Ret	13
17	(Netherlands) Steijn Schothorst	18	15	Ret	15	13	Ret	Ret	Ret	13	12	12	C	11	10	6	18	8
18	(Colombia) Tatiana Calderón	14	Ret	13	12	14	15	Ret	13	16	13	7	C	13	8	16	15	7
19	(United States) Santino Ferrucci	9	8	Ret	13	Ret	9											3
20	(Brazil) Bruno Baptista	16	13	14	Ret	15	14	10	Ret	Ret	16	10	C	16	13	10	9	3
21	(Italy) Juan Manuel Correa									15	Ret	Ret	C	15	16	12	12	0
22	(France) Matthieu Vaxivière							12	12	Ret	15							0
Pos.	Driver	R1	R2	R1	R2	R1	R2	R1	R2	R1	R2	R1	R2	R1	R2	R1	R2	Points
Pos.	Driver	CAT (Spain)		RBR (Austria)		SIL (United Kingdom)		HUN (Hungary)		SPA (Belgium)		MNZ (Italy)		JER (Spain)		YMC (United Arab Emirates)		Points

Key
Colour	Result
Gold	Winner
Silver	2nd place
Bronze	3rd place
Green	Other points position
Blue	Other classified position
Blue	Not classified, finished (NC)
Purple	Not classified, retired (Ret)
Red	Did not qualify (DNQ)
Red	Did not pre-qualify (DNPQ)
Black	Disqualified (DSQ)
White	Did not start (DNS)
White	Race cancelled (C)
Blank	Did not practice (DNP)
Blank	Excluded (EX)
Blank	Did not arrive (DNA)
Blank	Withdrawn (WD)
Text formatting	Meaning
**Bold**	Pole position point(s)
Italics	Fastest lap point(s)

Rookie

Notes:

- † — Drivers did not finish the race, but were classified as they completed over 90% of the race distance.

=== Teams' championship ===
Only three best-finishing cars are allowed to score points in the championship.

Pos.	Team	CAT (Spain)		RBR (Austria)		SIL (United Kingdom)		HUN (Hungary)		SPA (Belgium)		MNZ (Italy)		JER (Spain)		YMC (United Arab Emirates)		Points
Pos.	Team	R1	R2	R1	R2	R1	R2	R1	R2	R1	R2	R1	R2	R1	R2	R1	R2	Points
1	(France) ART Grand Prix	1	4	**1**	3	**1**	2	**1**	5	**1**	2	1	С	**1**	3	**2**	4	578
1	(France) ART Grand Prix	4	5	2	5	2	4	2	11	2	4	2	С	2	4	8	5	578
1	(France) ART Grand Prix	5	6	3	6	4	8	3	Ret	3	7	3	С	3	5	14	8	578
2	(Italy) Trident	6	2	5	2	7	1	5	1	5	1	5	С	7	2	7	1	286
2	(Italy) Trident	12	9	6	4	8	7	6	2	6	3	6	С	9	7	9	2	286
2	(Italy) Trident	13	11	9	9	9	13	7	3	7	8	9	С	12	14	10	7	286
3	(Switzerland) Jenzer Motorsport	3	1	7	8	3	5	4	8	4	6	16†	С	8	1	3	6	164
3	(Switzerland) Jenzer Motorsport	7	3	10	16	6	6	Ret	Ret	12	14	Ret	С	15	12	5	17	164
3	(Switzerland) Jenzer Motorsport									15	Ret	Ret	С	17	16	12	13	164
4	(United Kingdom) Arden International	2	14	Ret	14	5	3	9	6	9	9	12	С	6	10	1	13	91
4	(United Kingdom) Arden International	15	15	Ret	15	11	12	15	10	11	11	15†	С	11	11	6	18	91
4	(United Kingdom) Arden International	18	17	Ret	18	13	Ret	Ret	Ret	13	12	Ret	С	14	19	17†	Ret	91
5	(Spain) Campos Racing	8	7	8	1	10	10	11	7	8	5	4	С	10	9	13	11	56
5	(Spain) Campos Racing	10	10	11	10	12	11	13	9	14	10	8	С	18	15	Ret	16	56
5	(Spain) Campos Racing	11	16	15	11	16	Ret	14	Ret	Ret	Ret	11	С	19	17	DNS	Ret	56
6	(France) DAMS	9	8	13	12	14	9	10	12	16	13	7	С	4	8	4	3	48
6	(France) DAMS	14	13	14	13	15	14	12	13	Ret	15	10	С	13	15	11	10	48
6	(France) DAMS	16	Ret	Ret	Ret	Ret	15	Ret	Ret	Ret	16	13	С	16	Ret	16	15	48
Pos.	Team	R1	R2	R1	R2	R1	R2	R1	R2	R1	R2	R1	R2	R1	R2	R1	R2	Points
Pos.	Team	CAT (Spain)		RBR (Austria)		SIL (United Kingdom)		HUN (Hungary)		SPA (Belgium)		MNZ (Italy)		JER (Spain)		YMC (United Arab Emirates)		Points

Key
Colour	Result
Gold	Winner
Silver	2nd place
Bronze	3rd place
Green	Other points position
Blue	Other classified position
Blue	Not classified, finished (NC)
Purple	Not classified, retired (Ret)
Red	Did not qualify (DNQ)
Red	Did not pre-qualify (DNPQ)
Black	Disqualified (DSQ)
White	Did not start (DNS)
White	Race cancelled (C)
Blank	Did not practice (DNP)
Blank	Excluded (EX)
Blank	Did not arrive (DNA)
Blank	Withdrawn (WD)
Text formatting	Meaning
**Bold**	Pole position point(s)
Italics	Fastest lap point(s)

Notes:

- † — Drivers did not finish the race, but were classified as they completed over 90% of the race distance.
