= 2013 French F4 Championship =

French motorsport season

Seasons
- ← 2012 2014 →

The 2013 French F4 Championship season was the 21st season of the series for 1600cc Formula Renault machinery, and the third season to run under the guise of the French F4 Championship. The series began on 27 April at Le Mans and ended on 27 October at Le Castellet, after seven rounds and twenty-one races.

== Driver lineup ==
No.	Driver	Rounds
1	(France) Marco de Peretti	All
2	(Belgium) Neal Van Vaerenbergh	All
3	(France) Anthoine Hubert	All
4	(France) Florian Pottier	1–6
5	(Germany) Dennis Anoschin	All
6	(Finland) Simo Muhonen	All
7	(France) Jules Gounon	All
8	(China) Kang Ling	All
9	(France) Lucile Cypriano	1–6
10	(Switzerland) Felix Hirsiger	All
11	(Russia) Matevos Isaakyan	All
12	(India) Sidhant Panda	All
14	(Russia) Ivan Kostyukov	All
15	(France) Valentin Naud	1–2, 5
16	(Russia) Kirill Karpov	All
17	(France) Rémy Deguffroy	All
18	(France) Amaury Rossero	All
19	(France) Tom Le Coq	All
20	(Switzerland) Severin Amweg	All
21	(Switzerland) Justin Meichtry	1
22	(Estonia) Tristan Viidas	All
23	(France) Amaury Richard	All
24	(Sweden) Paul Hökfelt, Jr.	5–6

== Race calendar and results ==
Round		Circuit	Date	Pole position	Fastest lap	Winning driver
1	R1	(France) Bugatti Circuit, Le Mans	27 April	(France) Anthoine Hubert	(France) Florian Pottier	(France) Anthoine Hubert
1	R2	(France) Bugatti Circuit, Le Mans	27 April		(France) Anthoine Hubert	(Finland) Simo Muhonen
1	R3	(France) Bugatti Circuit, Le Mans	28 April	(Russia) Kirill Karpov	(France) Anthoine Hubert	(France) Anthoine Hubert
2	R1	(France) Circuit de Pau, Pau	19 May	(France) Anthoine Hubert	(France) Anthoine Hubert	(France) Anthoine Hubert
2	R2	(France) Circuit de Pau, Pau	19 May		(France) Anthoine Hubert	(France) Jules Gounon
2	R3	(France) Circuit de Pau, Pau	20 May	(France) Anthoine Hubert	(Belgium) Neal Van Vaerenbergh	(France) Anthoine Hubert
3	R1	(Belgium) Circuit de Spa-Francorchamps, Spa	8 June	(France) Anthoine Hubert	(Switzerland) Felix Hirsiger	(France) Anthoine Hubert
3	R2	(Belgium) Circuit de Spa-Francorchamps, Spa	9 June		(Finland) Simo Muhonen	(France) Anthoine Hubert
3	R3	(Belgium) Circuit de Spa-Francorchamps, Spa	9 June	(France) Anthoine Hubert	(Estonia) Tristan Viidas	(France) Anthoine Hubert
4	R1	(France) Circuit du Val de Vienne, Le Vigeant	6 July	(France) Anthoine Hubert	(France) Anthoine Hubert	(France) Anthoine Hubert
4	R2	(France) Circuit du Val de Vienne, Le Vigeant	6 July		(France) Anthoine Hubert	(Switzerland) Severin Amweg
4	R3	(France) Circuit du Val de Vienne, Le Vigeant	7 July	(France) Anthoine Hubert	(Russia) Ivan Kostyukov	(France) Anthoine Hubert
5	R1	(France) Circuit de Nevers Magny-Cours	7 September	(France) Tom Le Coq	(Estonia) Tristan Viidas	(France) Jules Gounon
5	R2	(France) Circuit de Nevers Magny-Cours	7 September		(France) Jules Gounon	(France) Jules Gounon
5	R3	(France) Circuit de Nevers Magny-Cours	8 September	(France) Tom Le Coq	(Russia) Matevos Isaakyan	(France) Jules Gounon
6	R1	(France) Circuit de Lédenon, Lédenon	12 October	(France) Anthoine Hubert	(France) Anthoine Hubert	(France) Jules Gounon
6	R2	(France) Circuit de Lédenon, Lédenon	12 October		(France) Anthoine Hubert	(France) Tom Le Coq
6	R3	(France) Circuit de Lédenon, Lédenon	13 October	(Estonia) Tristan Viidas	(Germany) Dennis Anoschin	(France) Jules Gounon
7	R1	(France) Circuit Paul Ricard, Le Castellet	26 October	(France) Anthoine Hubert	(Russia) Matevos Isaakyan	(France) Anthoine Hubert
7	R2	(France) Circuit Paul Ricard, Le Castellet	26 October		(Russia) Matevos Isaakyan	(France) Rémy Deguffroy
7	R3	(France) Circuit Paul Ricard, Le Castellet	27 October	(France) Anthoine Hubert	(Russia) Ivan Kostyukov	(France) Anthoine Hubert

== Championship standings ==
- Points are awarded to the top ten drivers in both races on a 25–18–15–12–10–8–6–4–2–1 basis. Additional points are awarded to the driver achieving pole position and fastest lap in each race. Only a driver's best twelve results count towards the championship.

Pos	Driver	LMS (France)			PAU (France)			SPA (Belgium)			VDV (France)			MAG (France)			LÉD (France)			LEC (France)			Points
1	(France) Anthoine Hubert	**1**	5	1	**1**	5	**1**	**1**	1	**1**	**1**	Ret	**1**	4	11	2	**11**	4	3	**1**	Ret	**1**	365
2	(France) Jules Gounon	6	Ret	2	8	1	9	5	17†	DNS	8	4	11	1	1	1	1	14	1	3	2	7	236.5
3	(Estonia) Tristan Viidas	Ret	Ret	9	5	11	2	4	4	3	7	2	8	7	4	15	3	5	**2**	16	8	11	169
4	(France) Tom Le Coq	12	10	17	6	4	3	3	15	9	3	10	2	**3**	14	**19**	9	1	7	6	3	4	166
5	(Russia) Matevos Isaakyan	3	3	13	Ret	16	7	8	3	DNS	4	3	4	2	12	4	4	8	9	5	10	6	153
6	(Switzerland) Felix Hirsiger	5	7	4	7	2	16	2	DNS	DNS	Ret	12	5	13	7	6	2	7	4	4	12†	3	151
7	(Germany) Dennis Anoschin	4	4	11	11	7	6	12	Ret	7	2	6	6	9	2	8	6	6	12	2	4	13	137
8	(Belgium) Neal Van Vaerenbergh	7	6	16	2	9	17	11	7	5	11	9	10	6	18	3	7	3	5	12	5	5	130
9	(Finland) Simo Muhonen	10	1	10	4	3	10	Ret	6	2	10	8	7	5	10	7	14	21†	20†	11	6	10	115.5
10	(France) Rémy Deguffroy	17	9	12	9	Ret	5	Ret	11	4	18	15	15	16	9	13	10	2	17	9	1	8	80
11	(Russia) Ivan Kostyukov	15	Ret	3	DNS	DNS	DNS	14	14	Ret	17	7	3	11	21†	18	13	11	19	7	DNS	2	62
12	(France) Florian Pottier	11	11	7	3	6	4	16†	9	6	12	Ret	12	10	5	17	15	13	18				60
13	(France) Marco de Peretti	9	Ret	5	Ret	12	Ret	6	8	DNS	DSQ	DSQ	Ret	12	3	5	5	10	14	8	DSQ	EX	60
14	(Switzerland) Severin Amweg	Ret	15	19	16	14	12	9	2	DNS	9	1	9	17	22†	11	18	18	11	17	11	12	52
15	(Russia) Kirill Karpov	2	8	**14**	12	13	8	13	10	DNS	5	14	17	14	15	9	19	9	8	15	9	14	50
16	(France) Amaury Rossero	13	12	Ret	13	8	13	7	13	8	6	5	14	8	6	10	12	15	10	10	13	DNS	45
17	(France) Valentin Naud	8	2	6	14	10	Ret							21†	8	12							34.5
18	(Sweden) Paul Hökfelt, Jr.													19	17	14	8	12	6				12
19	(France) Amaury Richard	16	13	Ret	10	Ret	18	DSQ	12	10	15	13	16	20	13	16	20	17	15	13	7	9	12
20	(China) Kang Ling	14	14	15	Ret	17	15	10	5	11	14	17	Ret	18	19	20	16	20	13	18†	DNS	DNS	11
21	(France) Lucile Cypriano	19	16	8	17	15	11	17†	Ret	12	13	11	13	15	16	DNS	Ret	19	Ret				4
22	(India) Sidhant Panda	18	17	18	15	18	14	15	16	13	16	16	18	Ret	20	Ret	17	16	16	14	Ret	15	0
	(Switzerland) Justin Meichtry	Ret	EX	EX																			0
Pos	Driver	LMS (France)			PAU (France)			SPA (Belgium)			VDV (France)			MAG (France)			LÉD (France)			LEC (France)			Points

Colour	Result
Gold	Winner
Silver	Second place
Bronze	Third place
Green	Points classification
Blue	Non-points classification
Blue	Non-classified finish (NC)
Purple	Retired, not classified (Ret)
Red	Did not qualify (DNQ)
Red	Did not pre-qualify (DNPQ)
Black	Disqualified (DSQ)
White	Did not start (DNS)
White	Withdrew (WD)
White	Race cancelled (C)
Blank	Did not practice (DNP)
Blank	Did not arrive (DNA)
Blank	Excluded (EX)

**Bold** – Pole
Italics – Fastest Lap

† — Drivers did not finish the race, but were classified as they completed over 75% of the race distance.
