= Steijn Schothorst =

Dutch racing driver (born 1994)

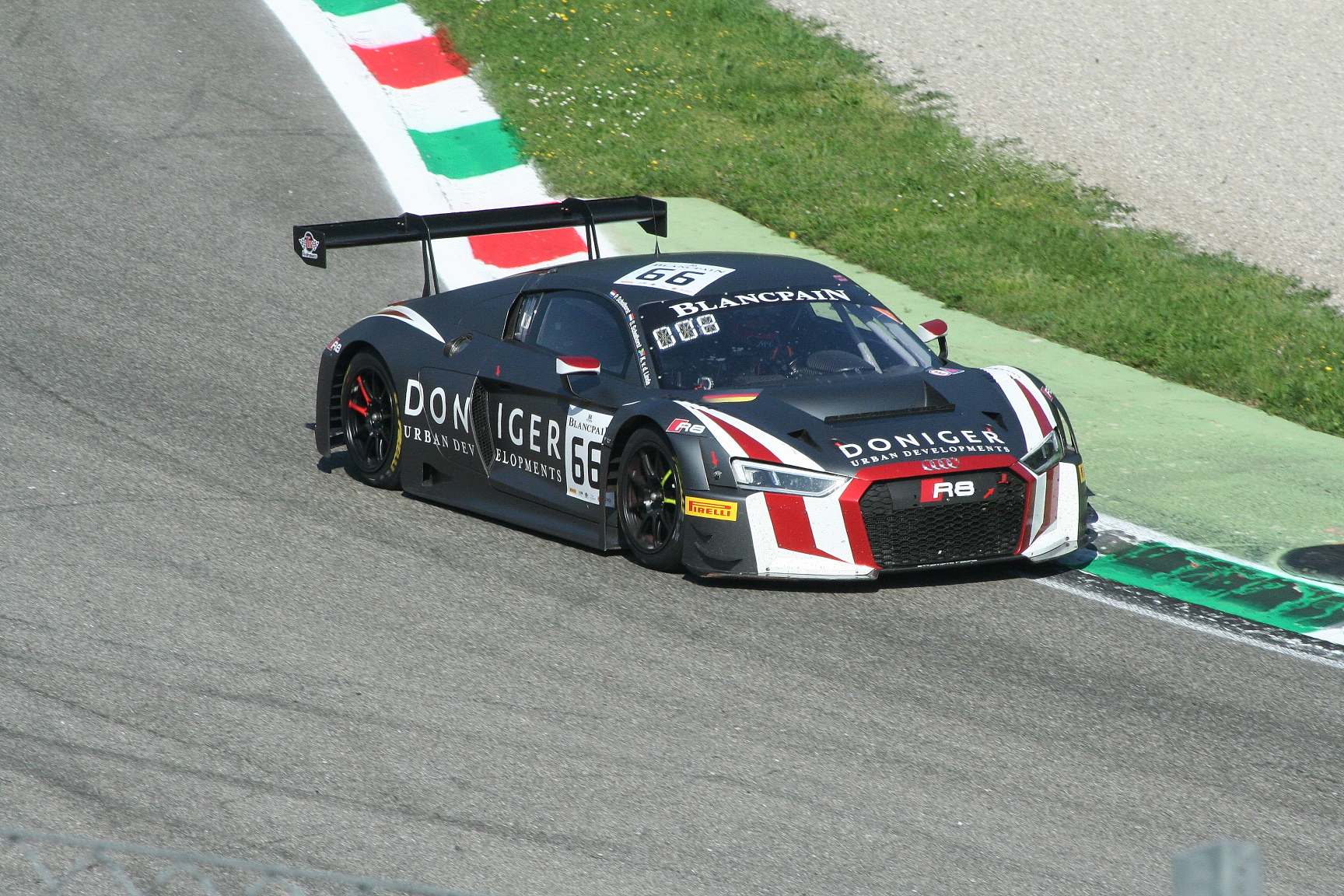
- Schothorst's Audi in 2018
- Nationality: (Netherlands) Dutch
- Born: 14 October 1994 (age 32) Blaricum, Netherlands
- Relatives: Jeroen Schothorst (father); Pieter Schothorst (brother); Freek Schothorst (brother); Bas Schothorst (cousin)

GT World Challenge Europe Endurance Cup career
- Debut season: 2017
- Current team: BWT Team GetSpeed Performance
- Categorisation: FIA Silver (until 2022); FIA Gold (2023–)
- Car number: 2

Steijn Schothorst (born 14 October 1994) is a Dutch former racing driver. He has competed in the GP3 Series, GT World Challenge Europe and ADAC GT Masters among others. He scored one Blancpain Sprint victory for Attempto Racing at Zolder in 2018, and finished second overall at the 2022 24 Hours of Spa for BWT Mercedes-AMG Team GetSpeed Performance.

His father Jeroen, his brothers Pieter and Freek, and his cousin Bas Schothorst are also active in Dutch motorsport.

== Karting and production car racing ==
In 2009, Schothorst finished second in the Dutch Karting Championship. The year after, at 15 years of age, he was declared KNAF Talent First. Later in 2010, he competed in the Formido Swift Cup under the guidance of Tim and Tom Coronel.

== Open-wheel racing ==
2011 saw his first tries at formula racing, finishing third in the Formula Ford EuroCup and second at the annual Formula Ford Festival. That winter, he drove a Radical SR3 RS for Coronel Racing in the Dutch Winter Endurance Series. In 2012, Schothorst was employed by Manor Motorsport and finished fifth in the Formula Renault 2.0 Northern European Cup, after winning two races. With the same team, he tried his hand at the Formula Renault 2.0 Eurocup, finishing 22nd.

In 2013's winter months, Schothorst traveled to New Zealand to compete in the Toyota Racing Series, the country's premier motorsport category for open-wheel cars. By finishing on the podium five times in fifteen races, he scored a fourth position in the championship. Although he won more races the next year, he became fourth again in 2014.

Currently, Schothorst is competing in Acceleration 2014, a multi-day festival combining top class car and bike racing with live music and other entertainment. So far, he has only participated during Acceleration in Monza. It is unknown whether he will enter more races in the championship, for he is also leading the Formula Renault 2.0 NEC championship, and competing in the Formula Renault 2.0 Eurocup.

== Racing record ==
=== Complete Eurocup Formula Renault 2.0 results ===
(key) (Races in bold indicate pole position; races in italics indicate fastest lap)

Year	Entrant	1	2	3	4	5	6	7	8	9	10	11	12	13	14	DC	Points
2012	Manor MP Motorsport	ALC; 1	ALC; 2	SPA; 1 Ret	SPA; 2; 22	NÜR; 1; 18	NÜR; 2; 6	MSC; 1; 30	MSC; 2; 13			LEC; 1 Ret	LEC; 2; 14	CAT; 1; 8	CAT; 2; 22	22nd	12
2012	Fortec Motorsports									HUN; 1; 20	HUN; 2; 14					22nd	12
2013	Josef Kaufmann Racing	ALC; 1; 6	ALC; 2; 22	SPA; 1 Ret	SPA; 2 Ret	MSC; 1; 3	MSC; 2; 14	RBR; 1; 6	RBR; 2; 10	HUN; 1; 13	HUN; 2; 12	LEC; 1; 14	LEC; 2; 13	CAT; 1; 15	CAT; 2; 12	14th	32
2014	Manor MP Motorsport	ALC; 1; 11	ALC; 2; 13	SPA; 1 Ret	SPA; 2; 13	MSC; 1; 21	MSC; 2; 16	NÜR; 1; 13	NÜR; 2; 17	HUN; 1; 19	HUN; 2; 10	LEC; 1; 13	LEC; 2; 5	JER; 1; 8	JER; 2; 9	17th	24

=== Complete Formula Renault 2.0 NEC results ===
(key) (Races in bold indicate pole position) (Races in italics indicate fastest lap)

Year	Entrant	1	2	3	4	5	6	7	8	9	10	11	12	13	14	15	16	17	18	19	20	DC	Points
2012	Manor MP Motorsport	HOC; 1; 7	HOC; 2 Ret	HOC; 3 Ret	NÜR; 1; 13	NÜR; 2; 10	OSC; 1; 4	OSC; 2; 21	OSC; 3; 3	ASS; 1; 6	ASS; 2; 7	RBR; 1; 9	RBR; 2 Ret	MST; 1; 5	MST; 2; 21	MST; 3; 1	ZAN; 1; 18	ZAN; 2; 1	ZAN; 3; 16	SPA; 1; 11	SPA; 2; 9	5th	212
2013	Josef Kaufmann Racing	HOC; 1; 8	HOC; 2; 10	HOC; 3; 5	NÜR; 1	NÜR; 2	SIL; 1	SIL; 2	SPA; 1	SPA; 2	**ASS**; **1**; 1	**ASS**; **2**; 1	MST; 1; 5	MST; 2; 4	MST; 3; 1	ZAN; 1; 2	ZAN; 2; 6	ZAN; 3 C				5th	202
2014	Manor MP Motorsport	MNZ; 1; 5	MNZ; 2; 3	SIL; 1; 5	SIL; 2; 3	HOC; 1; 9	HOC; 2; 2	HOC; 3; 7	SPA; 1; 4	SPA; 2; 1	ASS; 1 Ret	ASS; 2; 7	MST; 1 Ret	MST; 2; 4	MST; 3 C	NÜR; 1; 11	NÜR; 2; 7	NÜR; 3 C				4th	224

=== Complete GP3 Series results ===
(key) (Races in bold indicate pole position) (Races in italics indicate fastest lap)

Year	Entrant	1	2	3	4	5	6	7	8	9	10	11	12	13	14	15	16	17	18	Pos	Pts
2016	Campos Racing	CAT; FEA; Ret	CAT; SPR; 22	RBR; FEA; 20	RBR; SPR; 12	SIL; FEA; 14	SIL; SPR; 5	HUN; FEA; 22	HUN; SPR; 20	HOC; FEA; Ret	HOC; SPR; 17	SPA; FEA; 6	SPA; SPR; 7	MNZ; FEA; 13	MNZ; SPR; 13	SEP; FEA; 5	SEP; SPR; 10	YMC; FEA; 6	YMC; SPR; 7	13th	36
2017	Arden International	CAT; FEA; 18	CAT; SPR; 15	RBR; FEA; Ret	RBR; SPR; 15	SIL; FEA; 13	SIL; SPR; Ret	HUN; FEA; Ret	HUN; SPR; Ret	SPA; FEA; 13	SPA; SPR; 12	MNZ; FEA; 12	MNZ; SPR; C	JER; FEA; 11	JER; SPR; 10	YMC; FEA; 6	YMC; SPR; 18†			17th	8

^{†} Driver did not finish the race, but was classified as he completed over 90% of the race distance.

=== Complete GT World Challenge Europe results ===
==== GT World Challenge Europe Endurance Cup ====
(key) (Races in bold indicate pole position; races in italics indicate fastest lap)

Year	Team	Car	Class	1	2	3	4	5	6	7	Pos.	Points
2017	Strakka Racing	McLaren 650S GT3	Pro	MNZ	SIL	LEC	SPA; 6H	SPA; 12H	SPA; 24H	CAT; Ret	NC	0
2018	Attempto Racing	Audi R8 LMS	Pro	MNZ; 6	SIL; 19	LEC; Ret	SPA; 6H; 20	SPA; 12H; 18	SPA; 24H; 44	CAT; DNS	38th	8
2019	Attempto Racing	Audi R8 LMS Evo	Silver	MNZ; 24	**SIL**; 9	**LEC**; Ret	**SPA**; **6H**; 15	**SPA**; **12H**; 62	**SPA**; **24H**; Ret	CAT; 15	6th	46
2021	Attempto Racing	Audi R8 LMS Evo	Pro	MNZ	LEC	SPA; 6H	SPA; 12H	SPA; 24H	NÜR	CAT; 40†	NC	0
2022	BWT Team GetSpeed Performance	Mercedes-AMG GT3 Evo	Pro	IMO; 3	LEC; Ret	SPA; 6H; 7	SPA; 12H; 10	SPA; 24H; 2	HOC; 4	CAT; 8	5th	53

==== GT World Challenge Europe Sprint Cup ====
(key) (Races in bold indicate pole position; races in italics indicate fastest lap)

Year	Team	Car	Class	1	2	3	4	5	6	7	8	9	10	Pos.	Points
2017	Strakka Racing	McLaren 650S GT3	Pro	MIS; QR	MIS; CR	BRH; QR	BRH; CR	ZOL; QR	ZOL; CR	HUN; QR	HUN; CR	NÜR; QR; 8	NÜR; CR; 8	24th	4
2018	Attempto Racing	Audi R8 LMS	Pro	ZOL; 1; 4	ZOL; 2; 1	BRH; 1; 8	BRH; 2; 3	MIS; 1 Ret	MIS; 2; 4	HUN; 1; 10	HUN; 2; 3	NÜR; 1; 6	NÜR; 2; 4	3rd	65
2019	Attempto Racing	Audi R8 LMS	Pro	BRH; 1 Ret	BRH; 2; 3	MIS; 1; 8	MIS; 2; 8	ZAN; 1; 12	ZAN; 2; 13	NÜR; 1; 14	NÜR; 2; 13	HUN; 1; 11	HUN; 2; 13	14th	13.5

=== Complete IMSA SportsCar Championship results ===
(key) (Races in bold indicate pole position; races in italics indicate fastest lap)

Year	Entrant	Class	Make	Engine	1	2	3	4	5	6	7	8	9	10	11	12	Rank	Points
2020	GRT Grasser Racing Team	GTD	Lamborghini Huracán GT3 Evo	Lamborghini 5.2 L V10	DAY; 14	DAY	SEB	ELK	VIR	ATL; 8	MDO	CLT	PET	LGA	SEB; 10		33rd	61
2021	GRT Grasser Racing Team	GTD	Lamborghini Huracán GT3 Evo	Lamborghini 5.2 L V10	DAY; 18	SEB	MDO	DET	WGL	WGL	LIM	ELK	LGA	LBH	VIR	PET	74th	160

=== Complete ADAC GT Masters results ===
(key) (Races in bold indicate pole position; races in italics indicate fastest lap)

Year	Team	Car	1	2	3	4	5	6	7	8	9	10	11	12	13	14	DC	Points
2020	GRT Grasser Racing Team	Lamborghini Huracán GT3 Evo	LAU1; 1; 15	LAU1; 2; 19	NÜR; 1; 15	NÜR; 2; 9	HOC; 1; 3	**HOC**; **2**; 5	SAC; 1; 4	SAC; 2 Ret	**RBR**; **1**; 7	**RBR**; **2**; 9	LAU2; 1; 21	LAU2; 2; 14	OSC; 1; 17	OSC; 2 Ret	13th	67
2021	GRT Grasser Racing Team	Lamborghini Huracán GT3 Evo	OSC; 1; 14	OSC; 2; 21	RBR; 1	RBR; 2	ZAN; 1	ZAN; 2	LAU; 1	LAU; 2	SAC; 1	SAC; 2	HOC; 1	HOC; 2	NÜR; 1	NÜR; 2	42nd	2
