= Ryan Tveter =

American racing driver (born 1994)

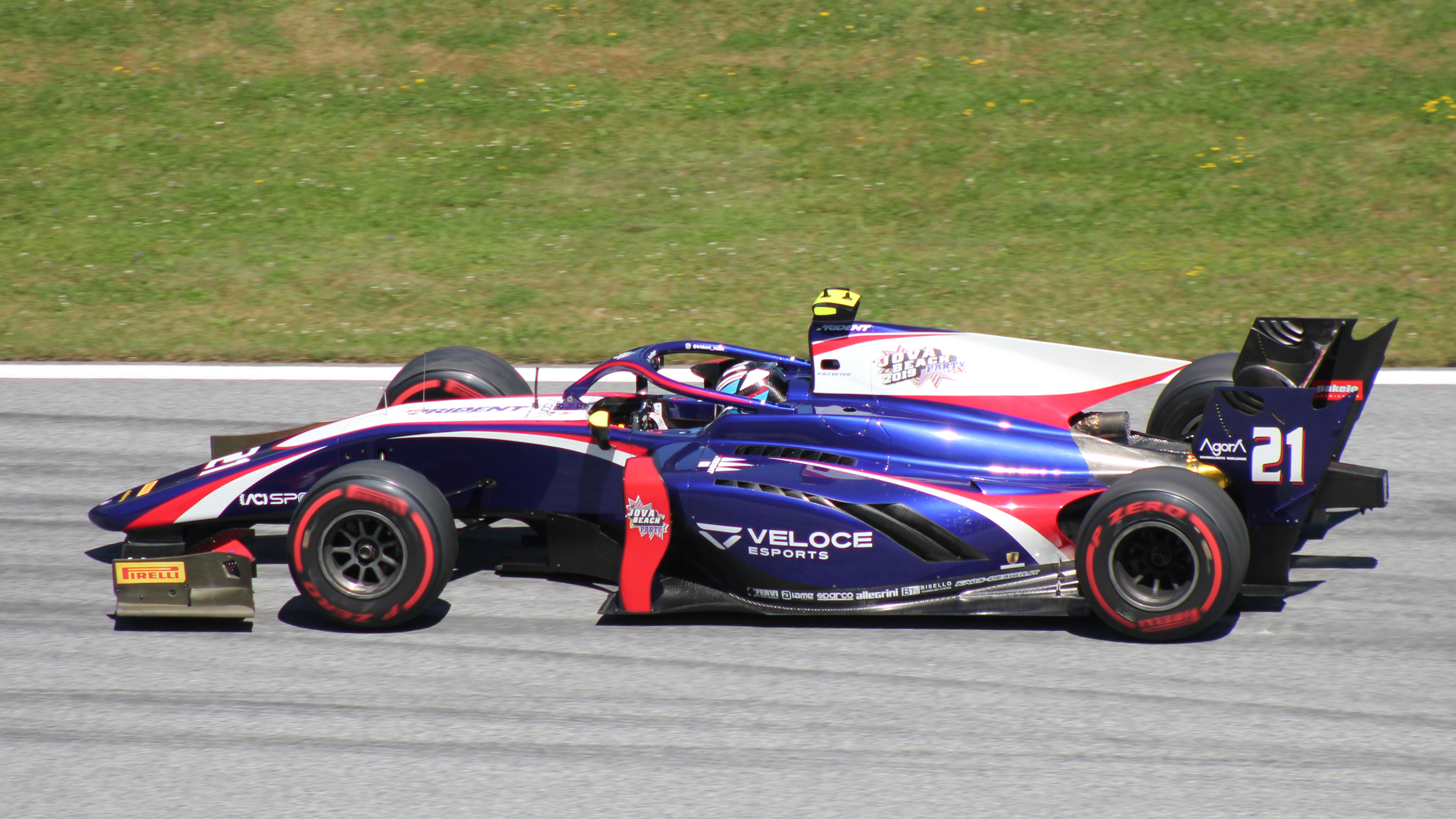
- Tveter during 2019 Red Bull Ring FIA Formula 2 round
- Nationality: (United States) American
- Born: May 20, 1994 (age 32) Oyster Bay, New York, U.S.

GP3 Series career
- Debut season: 2017
- Current team: Trident
- Car number: 7
- Starts: 33
- Wins: 0
- Poles: 0
- Fastest laps: 1
- Best finish: 8th in 2017

Previous series
- 2015–16 2014: FIA European Formula 3 Championship; Formula Renault 2.0

Ryan Tveter (born May 20, 1994) is an American former racing driver from Oyster Bay, New York, who last raced for Trident in the 2019 FIA Formula 2 Championship.

== Career ==
=== 2019 ===
Tveter made his debut in the FIA Formula 2 championship as a replacement driver for the Austrian round under the Trident Racing Team. Tveter was classified 27th for the final 2019 FIA Formula 2 Championship standings.

=== 2017 ===
Tveter made his debut in the GP3 Series after being named as one of Trident's full-season drivers for the 2017 season.

=== 2016 ===
Tveter caused one of the heaviest crashes in motorsport during the FIA Formula 3 European Championship race in Spielberg. Tveter's spin caused a cloud of dust, in which driver Peter Li Zhi Cong lost visibility. Li collided with Tveter's stalled car and was catapulted into the air.

== Racing record ==
=== Career summary ===
Season	Series	Team	Races	Wins	Poles	F/Laps	Podiums	Points	Position
2011	Formula Tour 1600	Jensen MotorSport	3	0	0	0	0	82	27th
2011	U.S. F2000 National Championship	Jensen MotorSport	2	0	0	0	0	0	NC†
2012	Star Mazda Championship	Team GDT	12	0	0	0	0	91	18th
2012	Star Mazda Championship	Team Pelfrey	1	0	0	0	0	91	18th
2013	Formula Renault 2.0 NEC	Fortec Competition	16	0	0	0	0	86	16th
2014	Formula Renault 2.0 NEC	Josef Kaufmann Racing	15	0	0	0	1	150	9th
2014	Eurocup Formula Renault 2.0	Josef Kaufmann Racing	12	0	0	0	0	1	23rd
2014	Toyota Racing Series	Giles Motorsport	15	0	0	0	2	344	17th
2015	FIA Formula 3 European Championship	Jagonya Ayam with Carlin	33	0	0	0	0	2	23rd
2016	FIA Formula 3 European Championship	Carlin	18	0	0	0	0	25	17th
2017	GP3 Series	Trident	15	0	0	0	3	78	8th
2018	GP3 Series	Trident	18	0	0	1	2	69	9th
2019	FIA Formula 2 Championship	Trident	2	0	0	0	0	0	27th

† As he was a guest driver, Tveter was ineligible to score points.

=== Complete Star Mazda Championship results ===
Year	Team	1	2	3	4	5	6	7	8	9	10	11	12	13	14	15	16	17	Rank	Points
2012	Team GDT	STP; 21	STP; 21	BAR	BAR	IND	IOW	TOR; 20	TOR; 20	EDM; 5	EDM; 10	TRO; 18	TRO; 10	BAL; 11	BAL; 12	LAG; 14	LAG; 16		18th	91
2012	Team Pelfrey																	ATL; 16	18th	91

=== Complete Formula Renault 2.0 NEC results ===
(key) (Races in bold indicate pole position) (Races in italics indicate fastest lap)

Year	Entrant	1	2	3	4	5	6	7	8	9	10	11	12	13	14	15	16	17	DC	Points
2013	Fortec Competition	HOC; 1; 30	HOC; 2; 25	HOC; 3; 25	NÜR; 1 Ret	NÜR; 2; 11	SIL; 1; 19	SIL; 2; 9	SPA; 1; 5	SPA; 2; 4	ASS; 1; 16	ASS; 2; 14	MST; 1; 19	MST; 2; 17	MST; 3; 27	ZAN; 1; 9	ZAN; 2; 24	ZAN; 3 C	16th	87
2014	Josef Kaufmann Racing	MNZ; 1 Ret	MNZ; 2; 15	SIL; 1; 15	SIL; 2; 6	HOC; 1; 12	HOC; 2; 11	HOC; 3; 11	SPA; 1; 5	SPA; 2; 15	ASS; 1; 6	ASS; 2; 2	MST; 1; 12	MST; 2; 11	MST; 3 C	NÜR; 1; 15	NÜR; 2; 13	NÜR; 3 C	9th	150

=== Complete Eurocup Formula Renault 2.0 results ===
(key) (Races in bold indicate pole position) (Races in italics indicate fastest lap)

Year	Entrant	1	2	3	4	5	6	7	8	9	10	11	12	13	14	Pos	Points
2013	Fortec Motorsports	ALC; 1	ALC; 2	SPA; 1	SPA; 2	MSC; 1	MSC; 2	RBR; 1	RBR; 2	HUN; 1; 24	HUN; 2; 27	LEC; 1 Ret	LEC; 2 Ret	CAT; 1	CAT; 2	NC†	0
2014	Josef Kaufmann Racing	ALC; 1; 23	ALC; 2; 12	SPA; 1; 23	SPA; 2 Ret	SIL; 1; 12	SIL; 2; 11	NÜR; 1; 22	NÜR; 2 Ret	HUN; 1; 23	HUN; 2; 13	LEC; 1; 15	LEC; 2 Ret	JER; 1	JER; 2	23rd	1

† As Tveter was a guest driver, he was ineligible for points

=== Complete FIA Formula 3 European Championship results ===
(key) (Races in bold indicate pole position) (Races in italics indicate fastest lap)

Year	Entrant	Engine	1	2	3	4	5	6	7	8	9	10	11	12	13	14	15	16	17	18	19	20	21	22	23	24	25	26	27	28	29	30	31	32	33	DC	Points
2015	Jagonya Ayam with Carlin	Volkswagen	SIL; 1 Ret	SIL; 2; 15	SIL; 3; 11	HOC; 1 Ret	HOC; 2 Ret	HOC; 3; 20	PAU; 1; 24	PAU; 2; 21	PAU; 3; 17	MNZ; 1; 12	MNZ; 2; 27	MNZ; 3 Ret	SPA; 1; 11	SPA; 2; 12	SPA; 3; 14	NOR; 1; 13	NOR; 2 Ret	NOR; 3; 21	ZAN; 1 Ret	ZAN; 2; 9	ZAN; 3 Ret	RBR; 1 Ret	RBR; 2 Ret	RBR; 3; 32	ALG; 1; 23	ALG; 2; 21	ALG; 3; 12	NÜR; 1; 24	NÜR; 2; 16	NÜR; 3; 21	HOC; 1; 16	HOC; 2; 29	HOC; 3 Ret	23rd	2
2016	Carlin	Volkswagen	LEC; 1; 15	LEC; 2; 7	LEC; 3 Ret	HUN; 1; 11	HUN; 2; 11	HUN; 3 DNS	PAU; 1; 7	PAU; 2 Ret	PAU; 3; 7	RBR; 1; 15	RBR; 2 DNS	RBR; 3 DNS	NOR; 1; 13	NOR; 2 Ret	NOR; 3; 13	ZAN; 1; 8	ZAN; 2; 14	ZAN; 3; 14	SPA; 1; 9	SPA; 2; 9	SPA; 3; 16	NÜR; 1	NÜR; 2	NÜR; 3	IMO; 1	IMO; 2	IMO; 3	HOC; 1	HOC; 2	HOC; 3				17th	25

=== Complete GP3 Series results ===
(key) (Races in bold indicate pole position) (Races in italics indicate fastest lap)

Year	Entrant	1	2	3	4	5	6	7	8	9	10	11	12	13	14	15	16	17	18	Pos	Points
2017	Trident	CAT; FEA; 12	CAT; SPR; 18	RBR; FEA; 5	RBR; SPR; 4	SIL; FEA; Ret	SIL; SPR; 13	HUN; FEA; 8	HUN; SPR; 2	SPA; FEA; 6	SPA; SPR; 3	MNZ; FEA; 5	MNZ; SPR; C	JER; FEA; 12	JER; SPR; 14	YMC; FEA; 8	YMC; SPR; 2			8th	78
2018	Trident	CAT; FEA; 17	CAT; SPR; 14	LEC; FEA; 11	LEC; SPR; 9	RBR; FEA; 7	RBR; SPR; Ret	SIL; FEA; 4	SIL; SPR; 3	HUN; FEA; 5	HUN; SPR; 6	SPA; FEA; 2	SPA; SPR; 8	MNZ; FEA; 11	MNZ; SPR; 16	SOC; FEA; 18	SOC; SPR; 9	YMC; FEA; 11	YMC; SPR; 5	9th	69

=== Complete FIA Formula 2 Championship results ===
(key) (Races in bold indicate pole position) (Races in italics indicate points for the fastest lap of top ten finishers)

Year	Entrant	1	2	3	4	5	6	7	8	9	10	11	12	13	14	15	16	17	18	19	20	21	22	23	24	DC	Points
2019	Trident	BHR; FEA	BHR; SPR	BAK; FEA	BAK; SPR	CAT; FEA	CAT; SPR	MON; FEA	MON; SPR	LEC; FEA	LEC; SPR	RBR; SPR; 17	RBR; SPR; 16	SIL; FEA	SIL; SPR	HUN; FEA	HUN; SPR	SPA; FEA	SPA; SPR	MNZ; FEA	MNZ; SPR	SOC; FEA	SOC; SPR	YMC; FEA	YMC; SPR	27th	0
