= Alessio Lorandi =

Italian racing driver (born 1998)

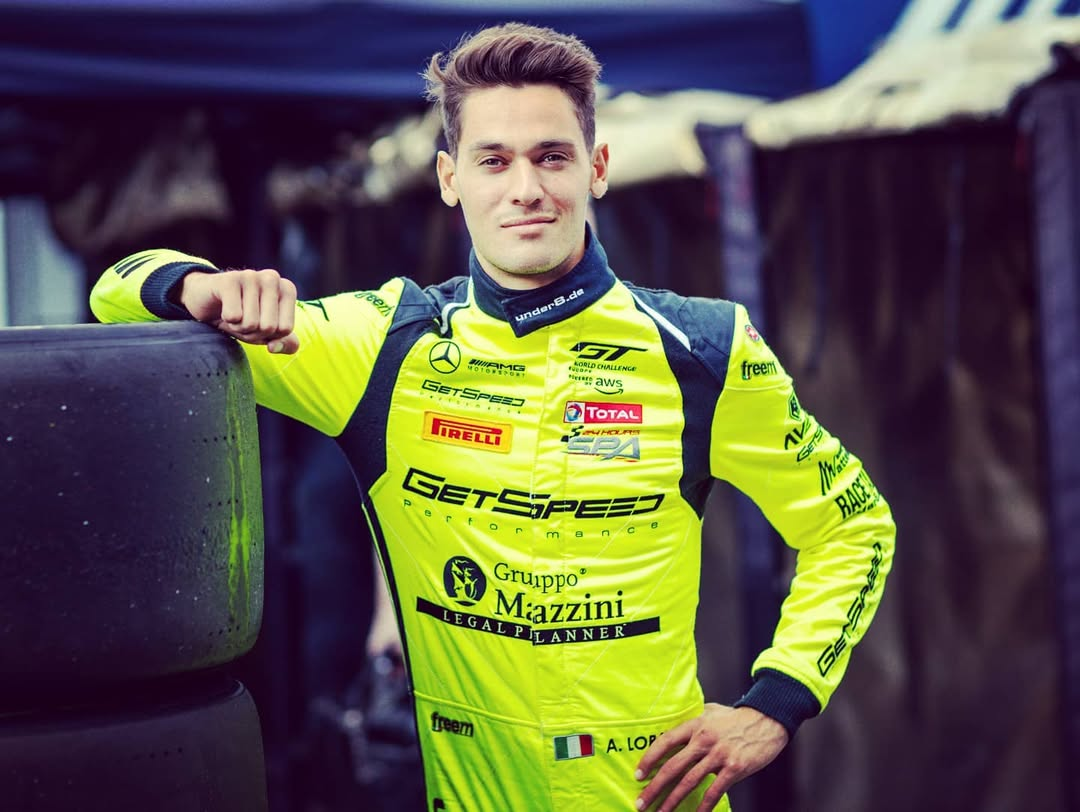
- Lorandi in his yellow Mercedes GT3 overall with GetSpeed in 2020
- Nationality: (Italy) Italian
- Born: 8 September 1998 (age 28) Salò, Italy

FIA Formula 2 Championship career
- Debut season: 2018
- Current team: Trident
- Categorisation: FIA Gold
- Car number: 17
- Starts: 10
- Wins: 0
- Poles: 0
- Fastest laps: 0
- Best finish: 20th in 2018

Previous series
- 2015–2016 2017–2018: European Formula 3 Championship; GP3 Series

Alessio Lorandi (born 8 September 1998) is an Italian former racing driver.

== Career ==
=== Karting ===
Lorandi began his racing career in karting in 2007. He won the Italian Championship in 2012 and 2013, and also won the junior CIK-FIA World Championship in 2013 and remained in karting until 2014, when he won the Andrea Margutti Trophy.

=== Formula 3 ===
In 2015, Lorandi debuted in open-wheel racing, straight from karting, in the FIA Formula 3 European Championship with Van Amersfoort Racing. He was Charles Leclerc's teammate. The following year, Lorandi switched to Carlin and claimed his maiden victory at the prestigious Pau Grand Prix.

=== GP3 Series ===
Lorandi made his debut in the series at the final two rounds of the 2016 season with Jenzer Motorsport. In 2017, he reunited with the team to contest the series full-time. He got four podiums and one win at Jerez.

=== Formula 2 ===
In July 2018, Lorandi was called up to be a temporary replacement for Santino Ferrucci at Trident's Formula 2 team, after Ferrucci aggressively crashed into his team-mate Arjun Maini on the cool-down lap at the 2018 Silverstone FIA Formula 2 round. This replacement was set to last for four races. But shortly after the Trident team chose to sack Ferrucci due to unsportsmanlike behaviour, resulting in Lorandi replacing Ferrucci for the remainder of the season.

== Personal life ==
Lorandi's younger brother Leonardo Lorandi is also a racing driver.

== Karting record ==
=== Karting career summary ===
Season	Series	Position
2010	Trofeo Andrea Margutti – 60 Mini	1st
2012	Italian Karting Championship – KF3	1st
2012	WSK Super Master Series – KF3	2nd
2012	WSK Euro Series – KF3	3rd
2012	WSK Final Cup – KF3	2nd
2013	Italian Karting Championship – KF3	1st
2013	WSK Super Master Series – KF3	1st
2013	WSK Euro Series – KF3	2nd
2013	WSK Final Cup – KF3	3rd
2014	Trofeo Andrea Margutti – KF	1st
2014	WSK Super Master Series – KF	2nd
2017	WSK Final Cup – KZ2	2nd
2018	Trofeo Andrea Margutti – KZ2	1st

== Racing record ==
=== Career summary ===
Season	Series	Team	Races	Wins	Poles	F/Laps	Podiums	Points	Position
2015	FIA Formula 3 European Championship	Van Amersfoort Racing	33	0	0	0	0	26	20th
2015	Formula Renault 2.0 Alps	GSK Grand Prix	2	0	0	0	0	0	NC†
2016	FIA Formula 3 European Championship	Carlin	21	1	1	1	2	96	14th
2016	GP3 Series	Jenzer Motorsport	4	0	0	0	0	0	23rd
2017	GP3 Series	Jenzer Motorsport	15	1	0	0	4	92	7th
2018	GP3 Series	Trident	8	0	0	0	1	42	11th
2018	FIA Formula 2 Championship	Trident	10	0	0	0	0	6	20th
2019	Macau Grand Prix	Trident	1	0	0	0	0	N/A	5th
2020	GT World Challenge Europe Endurance Cup	GetSpeed	3	0	0	0	0	6	21st
2020	Italian GT Championship Endurance Cup - GT3	AKM Motorsport	1	0	0	0	0	0	NC

† As Lorandi was a guest driver, he was ineligible for points

=== Complete FIA Formula 3 European Championship results ===
(key) (Races in bold indicate pole position) (Races in italics indicate fastest lap)

Year	Entrant	Engine	1	2	3	4	5	6	7	8	9	10	11	12	13	14	15	16	17	18	19	20	21	22	23	24	25	26	27	28	29	30	31	32	33	DC	Points
2015	Van Amersfoort Racing	Volkswagen	SIL; 1 Ret	SIL; 2; 16	SIL; 3; 14	HOC; 1 Ret	HOC; 2; 30	HOC; 3 Ret	PAU; 1; 6	PAU; 2; 13	PAU; 3; 7	MNZ; 1; 18	MNZ; 2; 13	MNZ; 3; 17	SPA; 1; 10	SPA; 2; 10	SPA; 3; 7	NOR; 1; 17	NOR; 2; 9	NOR; 3; 9	ZAN; 1; 30	ZAN; 2; 28	ZAN; 3; 19	RBR; 1; 15	RBR; 2; 28	RBR; 3; 20	ALG; 1; 17	ALG; 2; 27	ALG; 3 Ret	NÜR; 1; 19	NÜR; 2 Ret	NÜR; 3 Ret	HOC; 1; 12	HOC; 2; 13	HOC; 3; 12	20th	26
2016	Carlin	Volkswagen	LEC; 1; 12	LEC; 2; 6	LEC; 3; 9	HUN; 1; 6	HUN; 2; 6	HUN; 3; 12	PAU; 1; 10	PAU; 2; 15	**PAU**; **3**; 1	RBR; 1; 11	RBR; 2; 9	RBR; 3; 17	NOR; 1; 12	NOR; 2 Ret	NOR; 3; 8	ZAN; 1; 3	ZAN; 2; 5	ZAN; 3; 4	SPA; 1; 10	SPA; 2; 13	SPA; 3; 17	NÜR; 1	NÜR; 2	NÜR; 3	IMO; 1	IMO; 2	IMO; 3	HOC; 1	HOC; 2	HOC; 3				14th	96

=== Complete GP3 Series results ===
(key) (Races in bold indicate pole position) (Races in italics indicate fastest lap)

Year	Entrant	1	2	3	4	5	6	7	8	9	10	11	12	13	14	15	16	17	18	Pos	Points
2016	Jenzer Motorsport	CAT; FEA	CAT; SPR	RBR; FEA	RBR; SPR	SIL; FEA	SIL; SPR	HUN; FEA	HUN; SPR	HOC; FEA	HOC; SPR	SPA; FEA	SPA; SPR	MNZ; FEA	MNZ; SPR	SEP; FEA; 11	SEP; SPR; 9	YMC; FEA; 12	YMC; SPR; 20	23rd	0
2017	Jenzer Motorsport	CAT; FEA; 3	CAT; SPR; 3	RBR; FEA; 7	RBR; SPR; 8	SIL; FEA; 3	SIL; SPR; 6	HUN; FEA; 4	HUN; SPR; Ret	SPA; FEA; 12	SPA; SPR; 14	MNZ; FEA; Ret	MNZ; SPR; C	JER; FEA; 8	JER; SPR; 1	YMC; FEA; 5	YMC; SPR; 17			7th	92
2018	Trident	CAT; FEA; 11	CAT; SPR; 16	LEC; FEA; 5	LEC; SPR; 4	RBR; FEA; 3	RBR; SPR; 4	SIL; FEA; 10	SIL; SPR; 12	HUN; FEA	HUN; SPR	SPA; FEA	SPA; SPR	MNZ; FEA	MNZ; SPR	SOC; FEA	SOC; SPR	YMC; FEA	YMC; SPR	11th	42

=== Complete FIA Formula 2 Championship results ===
Year	Entrant	1	2	3	4	5	6	7	8	9	10	11	12	13	14	15	16	17	18	19	20	21	22	23	24	DC	Points
2018	Trident	BHR; FEA	BHR; SPR	BAK; FEA	BAK; SPR	CAT; FEA	CAT; SPR	MON; FEA	MON; SPR	LEC; FEA	LEC; SPR	RBR; FEA	RBR; SPR	SIL; FEA	SIL; SPR	HUN; FEA; 14	HUN; SPR; Ret	SPA; FEA; 13	SPA; SPR; 15	MNZ; FEA; 15	MNZ; SPR; 12	SOC; FEA; 7	SOC; SPR; Ret	YMC; FEA; 13	YMC; SPR; 14	20th	6
