= 2017 Barcelona GP3 Series round =

Motor racing competition

(Spain) 2017 Barcelona GP3 round
Round details
- Round 1 of 8 rounds in the 2017 GP3 Series
- Location: Circuit de Barcelona-Catalunya, Montmeló, Catalonia, Spain
- Course: Permanent racing facility 4.655 km (2.892 mi)

GP3 Series

Race 1
- Date: 13 May 2017
- Laps: 22

Pole position
Driver	(United Kingdom) Jack Aitken	ART Grand Prix
- Time: 1:34.187

Podium
First	(Japan) Nirei Fukuzumi	ART Grand Prix
Second	(Italy) Leonardo Pulcini	Arden International
Third	(Italy) Alessio Lorandi	Jenzer Motorsport

Fastest lap
Driver	(France) Anthoine Hubert	ART Grand Prix
- Time: 1:39.386 (on lap 9)

Race 2
- Date: 14 May 2017
- Laps: 17

Podium
First	(India) Arjun Maini	Jenzer Motorsport
Second	(France) Dorian Boccolacci	Trident
Third	(Italy) Alessio Lorandi	Jenzer Motorsport

Fastest lap
Driver	(Italy) Leonardo Pulcini (Note: Leonardo Pulcini set the fastest lap, but did not finish in the top 10, so was ineligible to be the point-scorer for the fastest lap. George Russell was the point-scorer instead for setting the fastest lap of those finishing in the top 10.)	Arden International
- Time: 1:37.654 (on lap 4)

The 2017 Barcelona GP3 Series round was the first round of the 2017 GP3 Series. It was held on 13 and 14 May 2017 at the Circuit de Barcelona-Catalunya in Montmeló, Catalonia, Spain. The race supported the 2017 Spanish Grand Prix.

== Classification ==
=== Qualifying ===
Pos.	No.	Driver	Team	Time	Gap	Grid
1	1	(United Kingdom) Jack Aitken	ART Grand Prix	1:34.187		1
2	2	(Japan) Nirei Fukuzumi	ART Grand Prix	1:34.358	+0.171	2
3	12	(France) Dorian Boccolacci	Trident	1:34.380	+0.193	3
4	3	(United Kingdom) George Russell	ART Grand Prix	1:34.468	+0.281	4
5	6	(Italy) Leonardo Pulcini	Arden International	1:34.602	+0.415	5
6	24	(India) Arjun Maini	Jenzer Motorsport	1:34.685	+0.498	6
7	10	(France) Giuliano Alesi	Trident	1:34.708	+0.521	10^{1}
8	22	(Italy) Alessio Lorandi	Jenzer Motorsport	1:34.720	+0.533	7
9	28	(Argentina) Marcos Siebert	Campos Racing	1:34.788	+0.601	8
10	4	(France) Anthoine Hubert	ART Grand Prix	1:34.866	+0.679	9
11	5	(Finland) Niko Kari	Arden International	1:34.964	+0.777	PL^{2}
12	27	(South Africa) Raoul Hyman	Campos Racing	1:35.031	+0.844	11
13	7	(Netherlands) Steijn Schothorst	Arden International	1:35.041	+0.854	12
14	14	(United States) Santino Ferrucci	DAMS	1:35.070	+0.883	13
15	26	(France) Julien Falchero	Campos Racing	1:35.088	+0.901	14
16	11	(United States) Ryan Tveter	Trident	1:35.224	+1.037	15
17	9	(Switzerland) Kevin Jörg	Trident	1:35.423	+1.236	16
18	15	(Colombia) Tatiana Calderon	DAMS	1:35.613	+1.426	17
19	16	(Brazil) Bruno Baptista	DAMS	1:35.851	+1.664	18

Notes:

- ^1 – Giuliano Alesi received a three-place grid penalty guilty of driving in an erratic manner between turns 9 and 10.
- ^2 – Niko Kari was disqualified after he failed to stop for weighing and his team worked on the car afterwards. As a result, Kari started race 1 from the pit.

=== Feature Race ===
Pos.	No.	Driver	Team	Laps	Time/Retired	Grid	Points
1	2	(Japan) Nirei Fukuzumi	ART Grand Prix	22	36:41.269	2	25
2	6	(Italy) Leonardo Pulcini	Arden International	22	+7.433	5	18
3	22	(Italy) Alessio Lorandi	Jenzer Motorsport	22	+7.889	7	15
4	3	(United Kingdom) George Russell	ART Grand Prix	22	+11.807	4	12
5	4	(France) Anthoine Hubert	ART Grand Prix	22	+12.159	9	10 (2)
6	12	(France) Dorian Boccolacci	Trident	22	+14.364	3	8
7	24	(India) Arjun Maini	Jenzer Motorsport	22	+14.906	6	6
8	27	(South Africa) Raoul Hyman	Campos Racing	22	+30.986	11	4
9	14	(United States) Santino Ferrucci	DAMS	22	+31.314	13	2
10	28	(Argentina) Marcos Siebert	Campos Racing	22	+31.357	8	1
11	26	(France) Julien Falchero	Campos Racing	22	+31.912	14	
12	11	(United States) Ryan Tveter	Trident	22	+32.228	15	
13	9	(Switzerland) Kevin Jörg	Trident	22	+32.916	16	
14	15	(Colombia) Tatiana Calderon	DAMS	22	+33.288	17	
15	5	(Finland) Niko Kari	Arden International	22	+35.996	PL	
16	16	(Brazil) Bruno Baptista	DAMS	22	+37.783	18	
17	10	(France) Giuliano Alesi	Trident	22	+38.240	10	
18	7	(Netherlands) Steijn Schothorst	Arden International	22	+39.412	12	
Ret	1	(United Kingdom) Jack Aitken	ART Grand Prix	16	DNF	1	(4)
Fastest lap: (France) Anthoine Hubert − ART Grand Prix − 1:39.386 (lap 9)

=== Sprint Race ===
Pos.	No.	Driver	Team	Laps	Time/Retired	Grid	Points
1	24	(India) Arjun Maini	Jenzer Motorsport	17	28:05.908	2	15
2	12	(France) Dorian Boccolacci	Trident	17	+6.060	3	12
3	22	(Italy) Alessio Lorandi	Jenzer Motorsport	17	+7.171	6	10
4	4	(France) Anthoine Hubert	ART Grand Prix	17	+8.268	4	8
5	3	(United Kingdom) George Russell	ART Grand Prix	17	+9.335	5	6 (2)
6	2	(Japan) Nirei Fukuzumi	ART Grand Prix	17	+11.309	8	4
7	27	(South Africa) Raoul Hyman	Campos Racing	17	+14.085	1	2
8	14	(United States) Santino Ferrucci	DAMS	17	+16.638	9	1
9	9	(Switzerland) Kevin Jörg	Trident	17	+17.813	13	
10	26	(France) Julien Falchero	Campos Racing	17	+20.265	11	
11	10	(France) Giuliano Alesi	Trident	17	+23.251	17	
12	1	(United Kingdom) Jack Aitken	ART Grand Prix	17	+23.511	19	
13	16	(Brazil) Bruno Baptista	DAMS	17	+26.863	16	
14	5	(Finland) Niko Kari	Arden International	17	+27.888	15	
15	7	(Netherlands) Steijn Schothorst	Arden International	17	+29.709	18	
16	28	(Argentina) Marcos Siebert	Campos Racing	17	+31.093	10	
17	6	(Italy) Leonardo Pulcini	Arden International	17	+1:06.654	7	
18	11	(United States) Ryan Tveter	Trident	16	+1 Lap	12	
Ret	15	(Colombia) Tatiana Calderon	DAMS	11	DNF	14	
Fastest lap: (Italy) Leonardo Pulcini − Arden International − 1:37.654 (lap 4)

== Championship standings after the round ==
Drivers' Championship standings

Pos.	Driver	Points
1	(Japan) Nirei Fukuzumi	29
2	(Italy) Alessio Lorandi	25
3	(India) Arjun Maini	21
4	(France) Dorian Boccolacci	20
5	(United Kingdom) George Russell	20

Teams' Championship standings

Pos.	Team	Points
1	(France) ART Grand Prix	73
2	(Switzerland) Jenzer Motorsport	46
3	(Italy) Trident	20
4	(United Kingdom) Arden International	18
5	(Spain) Campos Racing	7

- Note: Only the top five positions are included for both sets of standings.

== See also ==
- 2017 Spanish Grand Prix
- 2017 Barcelona Formula 2 round

== Notes ==
Previous round: 2016 Yas Marina GP3 Series round	GP3 Series; 2017 season	Next round: 2017 Spielberg GP3 Series round
Previous round: 2016 Catalunya GP3 Series round	Barcelona GP3 round	Next round: 2018 Barcelona GP3 Series round
