= 2017 Budapest GP3 Series round =

Motor racing competition

(Hungary) 2017 Budapest GP3 round
Round details
- Round 4 of 8 rounds in the 2017 GP3 Series
- Location: Hungaroring, Mogyoród, Hungary
- Course: Permanent racing facility 4.381 km (2.722 mi)

GP3 Series

Race 1
- Date: 29 July 2017
- Laps: 22

Pole position
Driver	(United Kingdom) Jack Aitken	ART Grand Prix
- Time: 1:31.754

Podium
First	(United Kingdom) Jack Aitken	ART Grand Prix
Second	(Japan) Nirei Fukuzumi	ART Grand Prix
Third	(France) Anthoine Hubert	ART Grand Prix

Fastest lap
Driver	(United Kingdom) Jack Aitken	ART Grand Prix
- Time: 1:34.440 (on lap 20)

Race 2
- Date: 30 July 2017
- Laps: 17

Podium
First	(France) Giuliano Alesi	Trident
Second	(United States) Ryan Tveter	Trident
Third	(Switzerland) Kevin Jörg	Trident

Fastest lap
Driver	(United Kingdom) George Russell (Note: George Russell set the fastest lap, but did not finish in the top 10, so was ineligible to be the point-scorer for the fastest lap. Leonardo Pulcini was the point-scorer instead for setting the fastest lap of those finishing in the top 10.)	ART Grand Prix
- Time: 1:33.715 (on lap 16)

The 2017 Budapest GP3 Series round was the fourth round of the 2017 GP3 Series. It was held on 29 and 30 July 2017 at Hungaroring in Mogyoród, Hungary. The race supported the 2017 Hungarian Grand Prix.

== Classification ==
=== Qualifying ===
Pos.	No.	Driver	Team	Time	Gap	Grid
1	1	(United Kingdom) Jack Aitken	ART Grand Prix	1:31.754		1
2	3	(United Kingdom) George Russell	ART Grand Prix	1:31.936	+0.182	2
3	2	(Japan) Nirei Fukuzumi	ART Grand Prix	1:32.009	+0.255	3
4	12	(France) Dorian Boccolacci	Trident	1:32.307	+0.553	4
5	4	(France) Anthoine Hubert	ART Grand Prix	1:32.308	+0.554	5
6	10	(France) Giuliano Alesi	Trident	1:32.435	+0.681	6
7	5	(Finland) Niko Kari	Arden International	1:32.438	+0.684	7
8	9	(Switzerland) Kevin Jörg	Trident	1:32.647	+0.893	8
9	22	(Italy) Alessio Lorandi	Jenzer Motorsport	1:32.701	+0.947	9
10	15	(Colombia) Tatiana Calderon	DAMS	1:32.738	+0.984	10
11	11	(United States) Ryan Tveter	Trident	1:32.795	+1.041	11
12	7	(Netherlands) Steijn Schothorst	Arden International	1:32.800	+1.046	12
13	24	(India) Arjun Maini	Jenzer Motorsport	1:32.880	+1.126	13
14	28	(Argentina) Marcos Siebert	Campos Racing	1:32.956	+1.202	14
15	27	(South Africa) Raoul Hyman	Campos Racing	1:33.090	+1.336	15
16	26	(France) Julien Falchero	Campos Racing	1:33.269	+1.515	16
17	16	(Brazil) Bruno Baptista	DAMS	1:33.274	+1.520	17
18	6	(Italy) Leonardo Pulcini	Arden International	1:33.427	+1.673	18
19	14	(France) Matthieu Vaxivière	DAMS	1:33.615	+1.861	19

=== Feature Race ===
Pos.	No.	Driver	Team	Laps	Time/Retired	Grid	Points
1	1	(United Kingdom) Jack Aitken	ART Grand Prix	22	37:23.211	1	25 (6)
2	2	(Japan) Nirei Fukuzumi	ART Grand Prix	22	+4.489	3	18
3	4	(France) Anthoine Hubert	ART Grand Prix	22	+8.946	5	15
4	22	(Italy) Alessio Lorandi	Jenzer Motorsport	22	+16.563	9	12
5	12	(France) Dorian Boccolacci	Trident	22	+20.303	4	10
6	10	(France) Giuliano Alesi	Trident	22	+20.890	6	8
7	9	(Switzerland) Kevin Jörg	Trident	22	+21.618	8	6
8	11	(United States) Ryan Tveter	Trident	22	+22.772	11	4
9	5	(Finland) Niko Kari	Arden International	22	+25.082	7	2
10	16	(Brazil) Bruno Baptista	DAMS	22	+25.460	17	1
11	28	(Argentina) Marcos Siebert	Campos Racing	22	+28.209	14	0
12	14	(France) Matthieu Vaxivière	DAMS	22	+28.700	19	0
13	26	(France) Julien Falchero	Campos Racing	22	+29.196	16	0
14	27	(South Africa) Raoul Hyman	Campos Racing	22	+29.795	15	0
15	6	(Italy) Leonardo Pulcini	Arden International	22	+30.303	18	0
Ret	7	(Netherlands) Steijn Schothorst	Arden International	3	DNF	12	0
Ret	15	(Colombia) Tatiana Calderon	DAMS	0	DNF	10	0
Ret	24	(India) Arjun Maini	Jenzer Motorsport	0	DNF	13	0
DNS	3	(United Kingdom) George Russell	ART Grand Prix	0	DNF	2	0
Fastest lap: (United Kingdom) Jack Aitken − ART Grand Prix − 1:34.440 (lap 20)

=== Sprint Race ===
Pos.	No.	Driver	Team	Laps	Time/Retired	Grid	Points
1	10	(France) Giuliano Alesi	Trident	17	29:05.379	3	15
2	11	(United States) Ryan Tveter	Trident	17	+0.620	1	12
3	9	(Switzerland) Kevin Jörg	Trident	17	+2.418	2	10
4	12	(France) Dorian Boccolacci	Trident	17	+4.190	4	8
5	4	(France) Anthoine Hubert	ART Grand Prix	17	+6.955	6	6
6	5	(Finland) Niko Kari	Arden International	17	+8.903	9	4
7	27	(South Africa) Raoul Hyman	Campos Racing	17	+9.858	14	2
8	24	(India) Arjun Maini	Jenzer Motorsport	17	+12.740	18	1
9	28	(Argentina) Marcos Siebert	Campos Racing	17	+31.642	11	
10	6	(Italy) Leonardo Pulcini	Arden International	17	+42.876	15	(2)
11	3	(United Kingdom) George Russell	ART Grand Prix	17	+1:12.795	19	
12	14	(France) Matthieu Vaxivière	DAMS	17	+1:24.137	12	
13	15	(Colombia) Tatiana Calderon	DAMS	16	+1 Lap	17	
Ret	1	(United Kingdom) Jack Aitken	ART Grand Prix	13	DNF	8	
Ret	26	(France) Julien Falchero	Campos Racing	13	DNF	13	
Ret	16	(Brazil) Bruno Baptista	DAMS	8	DNF	10	
Ret	22	(Italy) Alessio Lorandi	Jenzer Motorsport	7	DNF	5	
Ret	7	(Netherlands) Steijn Schothorst	Arden International	6	DNF	16	
Ret	2	(Japan) Nirei Fukuzumi	ART Grand Prix	1	DNF	7	
Fastest lap: (United Kingdom) George Russell − ART Grand Prix − 1:33.715 (lap 16)

== Championship standings after the round ==
Drivers' Championship standings

	Pos.	Driver	Points
	1	(United Kingdom) George Russell	92
2	2	(United Kingdom) Jack Aitken	83
1	3	(France) Anthoine Hubert	78
1	4	(Japan) Nirei Fukuzumi	72
1	5	(France) Giuliano Alesi	66

Teams' Championship standings

Pos.	Team	Points
1	(France) ART Grand Prix	311
2	(Italy) Trident	152
3	(Switzerland) Jenzer Motorsport	100
4	(United Kingdom) Arden International	46
5	(Spain) Campos Racing	29

- Note: Only the top five positions are included for both sets of standings.

== See also ==
- 2017 Hungarian Grand Prix
- 2017 Budapest Formula 2 round

== Notes ==
Previous round: 2017 Silverstone GP3 Series round	GP3 Series; 2017 season	Next round: 2017 Spa-Francorchamps GP3 Series round
Previous round: 2016 Hungaroring GP3 Series round	Budapest GP3 round	Next round: 2018 Budapest GP3 Series round
