= 2017 Silverstone GP3 Series round =

(United Kingdom) 2017 Silverstone GP3 round
Round details
- Round 3 of 8 rounds in the 2017 GP3 Series
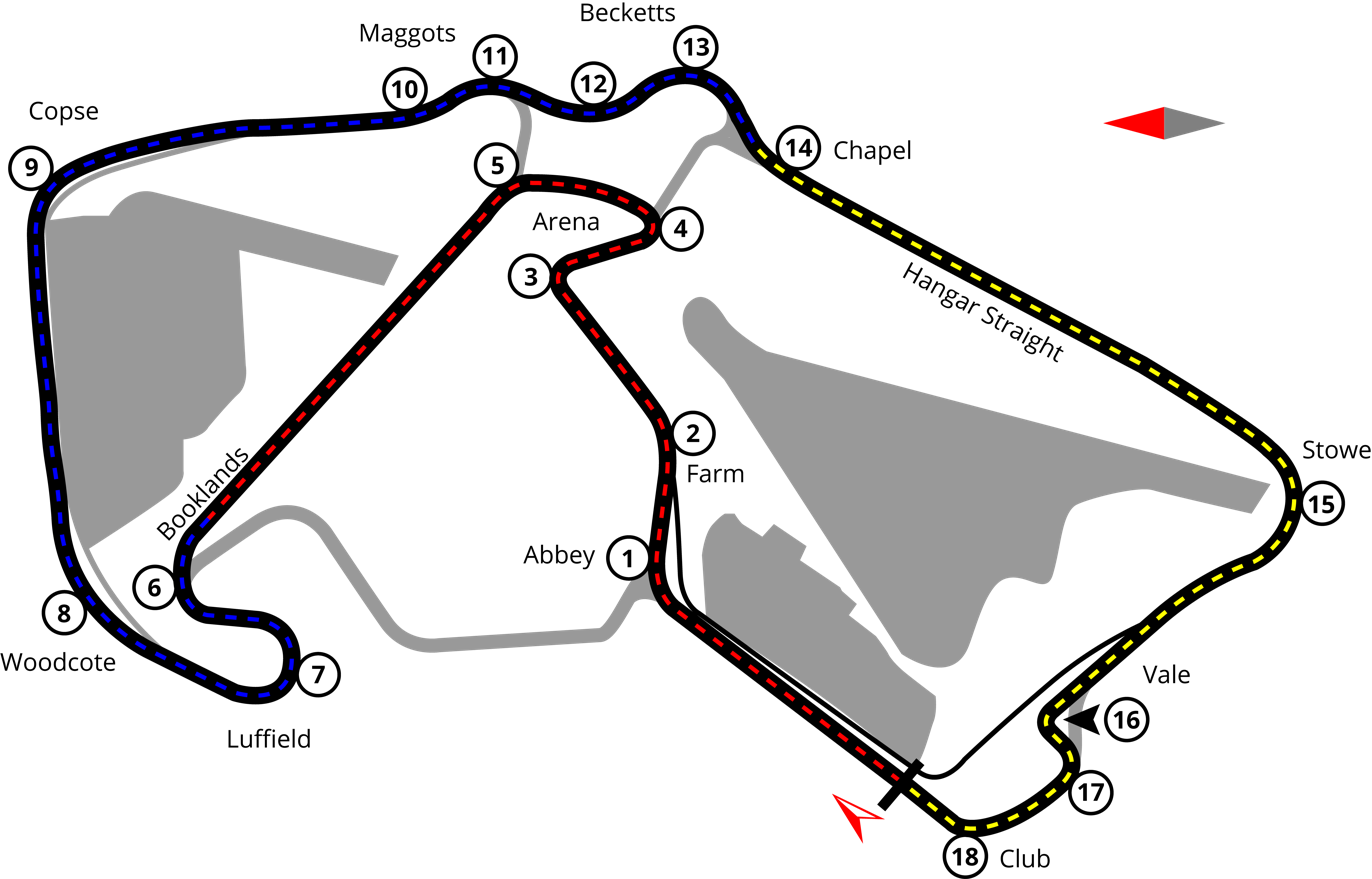
- Location: Silverstone Circuit, Silverstone, United Kingdom
- Course: Permanent racing facility 5.891 km (3.660 mi)

GP3 Series

Race 1
- Date: 15 July 2017
- Laps: 20

Pole position
Driver	(United Kingdom) George Russell	ART Grand Prix
- Time: 1:46.608

Podium
First	(United Kingdom) George Russell	ART Grand Prix
Second	(France) Anthoine Hubert	ART Grand Prix
Third	(Italy) Alessio Lorandi	Jenzer Motorsport

Fastest lap
Driver	(France) Giuliano Alesi	Trident
- Time: 1:49.838 (on lap 18)

Race 2
- Date: 16 July 2017
- Laps: 15

Podium
First	(France) Giuliano Alesi	Trident
Second	(United Kingdom) Jack Aitken	ART Grand Prix
Third	(Finland) Niko Kari	Arden International

Fastest lap
Driver	(United Kingdom) George Russell	ART Grand Prix
- Time: 1:48.862 (on lap 10)

The 2017 Silverstone GP3 Series round was the third round of the 2017 GP3 Series. It was held on 15 and 16 July 2017 at Silverstone Circuit in Silverstone, United Kingdom. The race supported the 2017 British Grand Prix.

== Classification ==
=== Qualifying ===
Pos.	No.	Driver	Team	Time	Gap	Grid
1	3	(United Kingdom) George Russell	ART Grand Prix	1:46.608		1
2	4	(France) Anthoine Hubert	ART Grand Prix	1:46.714	+0.106	2
3	2	(Japan) Nirei Fukuzumi	ART Grand Prix	1:46.833	+0.225	3
4	12	(France) Dorian Boccolacci	Trident	1:47.052	+0.444	7
5	22	(Italy) Alessio Lorandi	Jenzer Motorsport	1:47.082	+0.474	4
6	1	(United Kingdom) Jack Aitken	ART Grand Prix	1:47.090	+0.482	5
7	5	(Finland) Niko Kari	Arden International	1:47.259	+0.651	6
8	24	(India) Arjun Maini	Jenzer Motorsport	1:47.412	+0.804	8
9	11	(United States) Ryan Tveter	Trident	1:47.412	+0.804	9
10	26	(France) Julien Falchero	Campos Racing	1:47.473	+0.865	10
11	27	(South Africa) Raoul Hyman	Campos Racing	1:47.571	+0.963	11
12	10	(France) Giuliano Alesi	Trident	1:47.588	+0.980	12
13	9	(Switzerland) Kevin Jörg	Trident	1:47.658	+1.050	13
14	6	(Italy) Leonardo Pulcini	Arden International	1:47.677	+1.069	14
15	7	(Netherlands) Steijn Schothorst	Arden International	1:47.823	+1.215	15
16	14	(United States) Santino Ferrucci	DAMS	1:47.898	+1.290	16
17	28	(Argentina) Marcos Siebert	Campos Racing	1:47.977	+1.369	17
18	16	(Brazil) Bruno Baptista	DAMS	1:48.544	+1.936	18
19	15	(Colombia) Tatiana Calderon	DAMS	1:48.893	+2.285	19

- Dorian Boccolacci been given a three-place grid penalty in for crashing over the rear of Alessio Lorandi at the end of race two in Austria.

=== Feature race ===
Pos.	No.	Driver	Team	Laps	Time/Gap	Grid	Points
1	3	(United Kingdom) George Russell	ART Grand Prix	20	40:20.435	1	25 (4)
2	4	(France) Anthoine Hubert	ART Grand Prix	20	+1.128	2	18
3	22	(Italy) Alessio Lorandi	Jenzer Motorsport	20	+1.555	5	15
4	1	(United Kingdom) Jack Aitken	ART Grand Prix	20	+8.316	6	12
5	5	(Finland) Niko Kari	Arden International	20	+10.134	7	10
6	24	(India) Arjun Maini	Jenzer Motorsport	20	+10.731	8	8
7	10	(France) Giuliano Alesi	Trident	20	+10.990	12	6 (2)
8	12	(France) Dorian Boccolacci	Trident	20	+14.183	4	4
9	9	(Switzerland) Kevin Jörg	Trident	20	+15.205	13	2
10	26	(France) Julien Falchero	Campos Racing	20	+17.329	10	1
11	6	(Italy) Leonardo Pulcini	Arden International	20	+19.371	14	
12	28	(Argentina) Marcos Siebert	Campos Racing	20	+26.859	17	
13	7	(Netherlands) Steijn Schothorst	Arden International	20	+28.536	15	
14	15	(Colombia) Tatiana Calderon	DAMS	20	+30.283	19	
15	16	(Brazil) Bruno Baptista	DAMS	20	+45.967	18	
16	27	(South Africa) Raoul Hyman	Campos Racing	20	+58.289	11	
Ret	11	(United States) Ryan Tveter	Trident	13	DNF	9	
Ret	14	(United States) Santino Ferrucci	DAMS	7	DNF	16	
Ret	2	(Japan) Nirei Fukuzumi	ART Grand Prix	0	DNF	3	
Fastest lap: (France) Giuliano Alesi − Trident − 1:49.838 (lap 18)

=== Sprint race ===
Pos.	No.	Driver	Team	Laps	Time/Gap	Grid	Points
1	10	(France) Giuliano Alesi	Trident	15	30:04.801	2	15
2	1	(United Kingdom) Jack Aitken	ART Grand Prix	15	+0.724	5	12
3	5	(Finland) Niko Kari	Arden International	15	+1.431	4	10
4	3	(United Kingdom) George Russell	ART Grand Prix	15	+1.857	8	8 (2)
5	24	(India) Arjun Maini	Jenzer Motorsport	15	+5.900	3	6
6	22	(Italy) Alessio Lorandi	Jenzer Motorsport	15	+7.257	6	4
7	9	(Switzerland) Kevin Jörg	Trident	15	+8.099	9	2
8	4	(France) Anthoine Hubert	ART Grand Prix	15	+8.447	7	1
9	14	(United States) Santino Ferrucci	DAMS	15	+10.744	18	
10	28	(Argentina) Marcos Siebert	Campos Racing	15	+11.712	12	
11	27	(South Africa) Raoul Hyman	Campos Racing	15	+12.387	16	
12	6	(Italy) Leonardo Pulcini	Arden International	15	+17.079	11	
13	11	(United States) Ryan Tveter	Trident	15	+17.645	17	
14	16	(Brazil) Bruno Baptista	DAMS	15	+22.595	15	
15	15	(Colombia) Tatiana Calderon	DAMS	15	+23.280	14	
16	2	(Japan) Nirei Fukuzumi	ART Grand Prix	15	+28.539	19	
Ret	7	(Netherlands) Steijn Schothorst	Arden International	3	DNF	13	
Ret	26	(France) Julien Falchero	Campos Racing	3	DNF	10	
Ret	12	(France) Dorian Boccolacci	Trident	0	DNF	1	
Fastest lap: (United Kingdom) George Russell − ART Grand Prix − 1:48.862 (lap 10)

== Championship standings after the round ==
Drivers' Championship standings

	Pos.	Driver	Points
1	1	(United Kingdom) George Russell	92
1	2	(France) Anthoine Hubert	57
2	3	(Japan) Nirei Fukuzumi	54
1	4	(United Kingdom) Jack Aitken	52
1	5	(Italy) Alessio Lorandi	51

Teams' Championship standings

	Pos.	Team	Points
	1	(France) ART Grand Prix	241
	2	(Italy) Trident	91
	3	(Switzerland) Jenzer Motorsport	87
1	4	(United Kingdom) Arden International	38
1	5	(Spain) Campos Racing	27

- Note: Only the top five positions are included for both sets of standings.

== See also ==
- 2017 British Grand Prix
- 2017 Silverstone Formula 2 round

Previous round: 2017 Spielberg GP3 Series round	GP3 Series; 2017 season	Next round: 2017 Budapest GP3 Series round
Previous round: 2016 Silverstone GP3 Series round	Silverstone GP3 round	Next round: 2018 Silverstone GP3 Series round
