= 2017 Spielberg GP3 Series round =

Motor racing competition

(Austria) 2017 Spielberg GP3 round
Round details
- Round 2 of 8 rounds in the 2017 GP3 Series
- Location: Red Bull Ring, Spielberg, Austria
- Course: Permanent racing facility 4.318 km (2.683 mi)

GP3 Series

Race 1
- Date: 8 July 2017
- Laps: 24

Pole position
Driver	(United Kingdom) George Russell	ART Grand Prix
- Time: 1:19.114

Podium
First	(United Kingdom) George Russell	ART Grand Prix
Second	(United Kingdom) Jack Aitken	ART Grand Prix
Third	(Japan) Nirei Fukuzumi	ART Grand Prix

Fastest lap
Driver	(France) Anthoine Hubert	ART Grand Prix
- Time: 1:21.298 (on lap 24)

Race 2
- Date: 9 July 2017
- Laps: 18

Podium
First	(South Africa) Raoul Hyman	Campos Racing
Second	(France) Giuliano Alesi	Trident
Third	(Japan) Nirei Fukuzumi	ART Grand Prix

Fastest lap
Driver	(India) Arjun Maini (Note: Arjun Maini set the fastest lap, but did not finish in the top 10, so was ineligible to be the point-scorer for the fastest lap. Anthoine Hubert was the point-scorer instead for setting the fastest lap of those finishing in the top 10.)	Jenzer Motorsport
- Time: 1:21.252 (on lap 15)

The 2017 Spielberg GP3 Series round was the second round of the 2017 GP3 Series. It was held on 8 and 9 July 2017 at Red Bull Ring in Spielberg, Austria. The race supported the 2017 Austrian Grand Prix.

== Classification ==
=== Qualifying ===
Pos.	No.	Driver	Team	Time	Gap	Grid
1	3	(United Kingdom) George Russell	ART Grand Prix	1:19.114		1
2	1	(United Kingdom) Jack Aitken	ART Grand Prix	1:19.186	+0.072	2
3	12	(France) Dorian Boccolacci	Trident	1:19.255	+0.141	3
4	6	(Italy) Leonardo Pulcini	Arden International	1:19.258	+0.144	4
5	7	(Netherlands) Steijn Schothorst	Arden International	1:19.292	+0.178	5
6	10	(France) Giuliano Alesi	Trident	1:19.412	+0.298	6
7	11	(United States) Ryan Tveter	Trident	1:19.425	+0.311	7
8	4	(France) Anthoine Hubert	ART Grand Prix	1:19.440	+0.326	8
9	5	(Finland) Niko Kari	Arden International	1:19.479	+0.365	9
10	2	(Japan) Nirei Fukuzumi	ART Grand Prix	1:19.484	+0.370	10
11	22	(Italy) Alessio Lorandi	Jenzer Motorsport	1:19.493	+0.379	11
12	24	(India) Arjun Maini	Jenzer Motorsport	1:19.530	+0.416	12
13	27	(South Africa) Raoul Hyman	Campos Racing	1:19.561	+0.447	13
14	26	(France) Julien Falchero	Campos Racing	1:19.596	+0.482	14
15	9	(Switzerland) Kevin Jörg	Trident	1:19.680	+0.566	15
16	16	(Brazil) Bruno Baptista	DAMS	1:19.778	+0.664	16
17	14	(United States) Santino Ferrucci	DAMS	1:19.789	+0.675	17
18	28	(Argentina) Marcos Siebert	Campos Racing	1:19.832	+0.718	18
19	15	(Colombia) Tatiana Calderon	DAMS	1:19.872	+0.758	19

=== Feature Race ===
Pos.	No.	Driver	Team	Laps	Time/Retired	Grid	Points
1	3	(United Kingdom) George Russell	ART Grand Prix	24	34:13.306	1	25 (4)
2	1	(United Kingdom) Jack Aitken	ART Grand Prix	24	+2.390	2	18
3	2	(Japan) Nirei Fukuzumi	ART Grand Prix	24	+5.246	10	15
4	4	(France) Anthoine Hubert	ART Grand Prix	24	+14.051	8	12 (2)
5	11	(United States) Ryan Tveter	Trident	24	+23.181	7	10
6	10	(France) Giuliano Alesi	Trident	24	+23.885	6	8
7	22	(Italy) Alessio Lorandi	Jenzer Motorsport	24	+24.363	11	6
8	27	(South Africa) Raoul Hyman	Campos Racing	24	+24.930	13	4
9	12	(France) Dorian Boccolacci	Trident	24	+25.920	3	2
10	24	(India) Arjun Maini	Jenzer Motorsport	24	+26.229	12	1
11	9	(Switzerland) Kevin Jörg	Trident	24	+28.975	15	
12	28	(Argentina) Marcos Siebert	Campos Racing	24	+29.198	18	
13	15	(Colombia) Tatiana Calderón	DAMS	24	+30.489	19	
14	16	(Brazil) Bruno Baptista	DAMS	24	+31.654	16	
15	26	(France) Julien Falchero	Campos Racing	24	+41.942	14	
DNF	5	(Finland) Niko Kari	Arden International	14		9	
DNF	14	(United States) Santino Ferrucci	DAMS	3		17	
DNF	7	(Netherlands) Steijn Schothorst	Arden International	2		5	
DNF	6	(Italy) Leonardo Pulcini	Arden International	0		4	
Fastest lap: (France) Anthoine Hubert − ART Grand Prix − 1:21.298 (lap 24)

=== Sprint Race ===
Pos.	No.	Driver	Team	Laps	Time/Retired	Grid	Points
1	27	(South Africa) Raoul Hyman	Campos Racing	18	24:34.848	1	15
2	10	(France) Giuliano Alesi	Trident	18	+0.938	3	12
3	2	(Japan) Nirei Fukuzumi	ART Grand Prix	18	+5.799	6	10
4	11	(United States) Ryan Tveter	Trident	18	+7.107	4	8
5	1	(United Kingdom) Jack Aitken	ART Grand Prix	18	+7.949	7	6
6	3	(United Kingdom) George Russell	ART Grand Prix	18	+8.997	8	4
7	4	(France) Anthoine Hubert	ART Grand Prix	18	+9.172	5	2 (2)
8	22	(Italy) Alessio Lorandi	Jenzer Motorsport	18	+14.677	2	1
9	9	(Switzerland) Kevin Jörg	Trident	18	+15.310	11	
10	28	(Argentina) Marcos Siebert	Campos Racing	18	+15.890	12	
11	26	(France) Julien Falchero	Campos Racing	18	+16.487	15	
12	15	(Colombia) Tatiana Calderón	DAMS	18	+16.926	13	
13	14	(United States) Santino Ferrucci	DAMS	18	+17.106	17	
14	6	(Italy) Leonardo Pulcini	Arden International	18	+17.867	19	
15	7	(Netherlands) Steijn Schothorst	Arden International	18	+18.673	18	
16	24	(India) Arjun Maini	Jenzer Motorsport	18	+20.459	10	
17	12	(France) Dorian Boccolacci	Trident	17	+1 lap	9	
18	5	(Finland) Niko Kari	Arden International	17	+1 Lap	16	
Ret	16	(Brazil) Bruno Baptista	DAMS	9	DNF	14	
Fastest lap: (India) Arjun Maini − Jenzer Motorsport − 1:21.252 (lap 15)

== Championship standings after the round ==
Drivers' Championship standings

	Pos.	Driver	Points
	1	(Japan) Nirei Fukuzumi	54
3	2	(United Kingdom) George Russell	53
3	3	(France) Anthoine Hubert	38
2	4	(Italy) Alessio Lorandi	32
4	5	(United Kingdom) Jack Aitken	28

Teams' Championship standings

	Pos.	Team	Points
	1	(France) ART Grand Prix	159
1	2	(Italy) Trident	60
1	3	(Switzerland) Jenzer Motorsport	54
1	4	(Spain) Campos Racing	26
1	5	(United Kingdom) Arden International	18

- Note: Only the top five positions are included for both sets of standings.

== See also ==
- 2017 Austrian Grand Prix
- 2017 Spielberg Formula 2 round

== Notes ==
Previous round: 2017 Barcelona GP3 Series round	GP3 Series; 2017 season	Next round: 2017 Silverstone GP3 Series round
Previous round: 2016 Red Bull Ring GP3 Series round	Spielberg GP3 round	Next round: 2018 Spielberg GP3 Series round
