= 2016 Catalunya GP3 Series round =

Motor racing competition

(Spain) 2016 Catalunya GP3 round
Round details
- Round 1 of 9 rounds in the 2016 GP3 Series
- Layout of the Circuit de Catalunya
- Location: Circuit de Catalunya, Montmeló, Spain
- Course: Permanent racing facility 4.665 km (2.892 mi)

GP3 Series

Race 1
- Date: 14 May 2016
- Laps: 22

Pole position
Driver	(United Kingdom) Jake Hughes	DAMS
- Time: 1:34.632

Podium
First	(Monaco) Charles Leclerc	ART Grand Prix
Second	(United Kingdom) Jake Hughes	DAMS
Third	(Japan) Nirei Fukuzumi	ART Grand Prix

Fastest lap
Driver	(Monaco) Charles Leclerc	ART Grand Prix
- Time: 1:38.649 (on lap 22)

Race 2
- Date: 15 May 2016
- Laps: 17

Podium
First	(Thailand) Alexander Albon	ART Grand Prix
Second	(Colombia) Óscar Tunjo	Jenzer Motorsport
Third	(Italy) Antonio Fuoco	Trident

Fastest lap
Driver	(Colombia) Óscar Tunjo	Jenzer Motorsport
- Time: 1:38.722 (on lap 2)

The 2016 Catalunya GP3 Series round was a GP3 Series motor race on 14 and 15 May 2016 at the Circuit de Catalunya in Spain. It was the first round of the 2016 GP3 Series. The race weekend supported the 2016 Spanish Grand Prix.

The round saw the début of the third-generation GP3 car, the Dallara GP3/16, which replaced the GP3/13 chassis used between 2013 and 2015.

== Background ==
The defending champions for GP3, Esteban Ocon, were unable to defend their respective titles due to the ruling which forbids driver champions from returning to the series. Ocon served as a Mercedes development driver and was also the reserve driver for the Renault Formula 1 team, dovetailing his F1 commitments with a season in the DTM.

== Classification ==
=== Qualifying ===
The first qualifying for GP3's third-generation car started under clear skies, with Alexander Albon taking the early lead. Jake Dennis, Jack Aitken, Kevin Jörg, Charles Leclerc, and Nirei Fukuzumi all took turns at the head of the pack, but Jake Hughes had the last word, claiming pole with a terrific lap. With teammate Jörg in second, it was a dream debut qualifying for newcomer team DAMS.

Pos.	No.	Driver	Team	Time	Grid
1	27	(United Kingdom) Jake Hughes	DAMS	1:34.632	1
2	28	(Switzerland) Kevin Jörg	DAMS	1:34.772	2
3	1	(Monaco) Charles Leclerc	ART Grand Prix	1:34.949	3
4	2	(Japan) Nirei Fukuzumi	ART Grand Prix	1:35.048	4
5	9	(United Kingdom) Jake Dennis	Arden International	1:35.117	5
6	20	(Colombia) Óscar Tunjo	Jenzer Motorsport	1:35.160	6
7	5	(Italy) Antonio Fuoco	Trident	1:35.201	7
8	3	(Thailand) Alexander Albon	ART Grand Prix	1:35.207	8
9	17	(Switzerland) Ralph Boschung	Koiranen GP	1:35.344	9
10	11	(United Kingdom) Jack Aitken	Arden International	1:35.415	10
11	4	(Netherlands) Nyck de Vries	ART Grand Prix	1:35.463	11
12	10	(Colombia) Tatiana Calderón	Arden International	1:35.469	12
13	19	(Slovakia) Richard Gonda	Jenzer Motorsport	1:35.594	13
14	23	(Netherlands) Steijn Schothorst	Campos Racing	1:35.598	14
15	7	(France) Giuliano Alesi	Trident	1:35.656	PL^{1}
16	16	(Russia) Matevos Isaakyan	Koiranen GP	1:35.693	15
17	14	(United Kingdom) Matt Parry	Koiranen GP	1:35.746	19^{2}
18	26	(United States) Santino Ferrucci	DAMS	1:35.792	16
19	24	(Russia) Konstantin Tereshchenko	Campos Racing	1:36.070	17
20	18	(Malaysia) Akash Nandy	Jenzer Motorsport	1:36.157	18
21	6	(Poland) Artur Janosz	Trident	1:36.215	20
22	8	(Thailand) Sandy Stuvik	Trident	1:36.282	21
23	15	(India) Mahaveer Raghunathan	Koiranen GP	1:37.222	22
24	22	(Spain) Álex Palou	Campos Racing	1:37.248	23

1. – Alesi failed to stop at the weighbridge after qualifying and was forced to start from the pit lane.
2. – Parry received a three-place grid penalty for impeding a rival.

=== Race 1 ===
In contrast to the qualifying session, the sky was overcast and the threat of rain ever-present. A lightning start from Ferrari Driver Academy's Charles Leclerc saw him grab first place entering the first turn, while Kevin Jörg fell to fifth. After an exciting opening few laps, the field stagnated, with Leclerc edging away from polesitter Jake Hughes and teammate Nirei Fukuzumi. Further back in the pack, Jack Aitken stalled at the start, while Steijn Schothorst retired with mechanical problems. An intense battle developed between the Koiranen GP drivers, who were fighting for tenth place and the final point. Meanwhile, Leclerc continued to build a gap to Hughes, eventually recording his first GP3 win with a margin of just over six seconds. Hughes held off Fukuzumi for second, with Antonio Fuoco finishing a distant fourth. Behind them were Jörg, Alexander Albon, and Jake Dennis, who had a wild off-track moment early on at the final corner. Óscar Tunjo finished eighth, giving him reverse-grid pole for the Sprint Race, with Nyck de Vries and Ralph Boschung completing the top ten.

Pos.	No.	Driver	Team	Laps	Time/Retired	Grid	Points
1	1	(Monaco) Charles Leclerc	ART Grand Prix	22	36:38.694	3	25 (2)
2	27	(United Kingdom) Jake Hughes	DAMS	22	+6.023	1	18 (4)
3	2	(Japan) Nirei Fukuzumi	ART Grand Prix	22	+7.452	4	15
4	5	(Italy) Antonio Fuoco	Trident	22	+19.325	7	12
5	28	(Switzerland) Kevin Jörg	DAMS	22	+22.801	2	10
6	3	(Thailand) Alexander Albon	ART Grand Prix	22	+23.391	8	8
7	9	(United Kingdom) Jake Dennis	Arden International	22	+24.086	5	6
8	20	(Colombia) Óscar Tunjo	Jenzer Motorsport	22	+25.592	6	4
9	4	(Netherlands) Nyck de Vries	ART Grand Prix	22	+26.467	11	2
10	17	(Switzerland) Ralph Boschung	Koiranen GP	22	+27.104	9	1
11	16	(Russia) Matevos Isaakyan	Koiranen GP	22	+28.860	15	
12	14	(United Kingdom) Matt Parry	Koiranen GP	22	+30.952	19	
13	19	(Slovakia) Richard Gonda	Jenzer Motorsport	22	+33.095	13	
14	10	(Colombia) Tatiana Calderón	Arden International	22	+33.871	12	
15	26	(United States) Santino Ferrucci	DAMS	22	+34.241	16	
16	6	(Poland) Artur Janosz	Arden International	22	+36.835	20	
17	24	(Russia) Konstantin Tereshchenko	Campos Racing	22	+38.168	17	
18	8	(Thailand) Sandy Stuvik	Trident	22	+44.347	21	
19	22	(Spain) Álex Palou	Campos Racing	22	+44.902	23	
20	11	(United Kingdom) Jack Aitken	Arden International	22	+45.298	10	
21	18	(Malaysia) Akash Nandy	Jenzer Motorsport	22	+55.655	18	
22	7	(France) Giuliano Alesi	Trident	22	+1:00.294	PL	
23	15	(India) Mahaveer Raghunathan	Koiranen GP	22	+1:03.391	22	
Ret	23	(Netherlands) Steijn Schothorst	Campos Racing	0	Retired	14	
Fastest lap: (Monaco) Charles Leclerc(ART Grand Prix) – 1:38.649 (on lap 2)

=== Race 2 ===
Once again, the race was set up at the start, as there were no changes for position inside the top 10 after the opening lap. Óscar Tunjo made a good start from pole position, but it was Alexander Albon that took the lead with a sensational pass around the outside Tunjo in Turn 1. Another excellent start from Antonio Fuoco saw him rise to third, ahead of Jake Dennis, with Nyck de Vries and Matevos Isaakyan both making lightning getaways to be fifth and sixth, after starting ninth and eleventh, respectively. DAMS team-mates Kevin Jörg and Jake Hughes were involved in a race-long scrap for seventh, with Saturday's race winner Charles Leclerc in hot pursuit. Despite Tunjo having a pace advantage in sector one, Albon was faster in the second and third sectors of the lap, which allowed him to maintain his lead and claim a maiden victory. ART Grand Prix swept the opening weekend for the second season in a row. For the second sprint race in a row (dating back to the final weekend of the 2015 season), every driver finished the race, which was an impressive showcase of reliability from the brand-new GP3/16 car.

Pos.	No.	Driver	Team	Laps	Time/Retired	Grid	Points
1	3	(Thailand) Alexander Albon	ART Grand Prix	17	28:24.177	3	15
2	20	(Colombia) Óscar Tunjo	Jenzer Motorsport	17	+1.294	1	12 (2)
3	5	(Italy) Antonio Fuoco	Trident	17	+7.307	5	10
4	9	(United Kingdom) Jake Dennis	Arden International	17	+8.114	2	8
5	4	(Netherlands) Nyck de Vries	ART Grand Prix	17	+11.612	9	6
6	16	(Russia) Matevos Isaakyan	Koiranen GP	17	+12.505	11	4
7	28	(Switzerland) Kevin Jörg	DAMS	17	+15.012	4	2
8	27	(United Kingdom) Jake Hughes	DAMS	17	+15.670	7	1
9	1	(Monaco) Charles Leclerc	ART Grand Prix	17	+16.695	8	
10	17	(Switzerland) Ralph Boschung	Koiranen GP	17	+18.345	10	
11	26	(United States) Santino Ferrucci	DAMS	17	+18.757	15	
12	6	(Poland) Artur Janosz	Trident	17	+20.796	16	
13	2	(Japan) Nirei Fukuzumi	ART Grand Prix	17	+21.450	6	
14	22	(Spain) Álex Palou	Campos Racing	17	+21.934	19	
15	8	(Thailand) Sandy Stuvik	Trident	17	+24.818	18	
16	7	(France) Giuliano Alesi	Trident	17	+26.107	22	
17	19	(Slovakia) Richard Gonda	Jenzer Motorsport	17	+27.024	13	
18	10	(Colombia) Tatiana Calderón	Arden International	17	+27.582	14	
19	11	(United Kingdom) Jack Aitken	Arden International	17	+29.135	20	
20	14	(United Kingdom) Matt Parry	Koiranen GP	17	+29.524	12	
21	24	(Russia) Konstantin Tereshchenko	Campos Racing	17	+30.109	17	
22	23	(Netherlands) Steijn Schothorst	Campos Racing	17	+30.840	24	
23	18	(Malaysia) Akash Nandy	Jenzer Motorsport	17	+33.959	21	
24	15	(India) Mahaveer Raghunathan	Koiranen GP	17	+43.431	23	
Fastest lap: (Colombia) Óscar Tunjo (Jenzer Motorsport) – 1:38.722 (on lap 2)

== Standings after the round ==
Drivers' Championship standings

Pos	Driver	Points
1	(Monaco) Charles Leclerc	27
2	(Thailand) Alexander Albon	23
3	(United Kingdom) Jake Hughes	23
4	(Italy) Antonio Fuoco	22
5	(Colombia) Óscar Tunjo	18

Teams' Championship standings

Pos	Team	Points
1	(France) ART Grand Prix	71
2	(France) DAMS	35
3	(Italy) Trident	22
4	(Switzerland) Jenzer Motorsport	18
5	(United Kingdom) Arden International	14

- Note: Only the top five positions are included for both sets of standings.

== See also ==
- 2016 Spanish Grand Prix
- 2016 Catalunya GP2 Series round

Previous round: 2015 Yas Marina GP3 Series round	GP3 Series; 2016 season	Next round: 2016 Red Bull Ring GP3 Series round
Previous round: 2015 Catalunya GP3 Series round	Catalunya GP3 round	Next round: 2017 Barcelona GP3 Series round
