= 2016 Red Bull Ring GP3 Series round =

Austrian motor race

(Austria) 2016 Red Bull Ring GP3 round
Round details
- Round 2 of 9 rounds in the 2016 GP3 Series
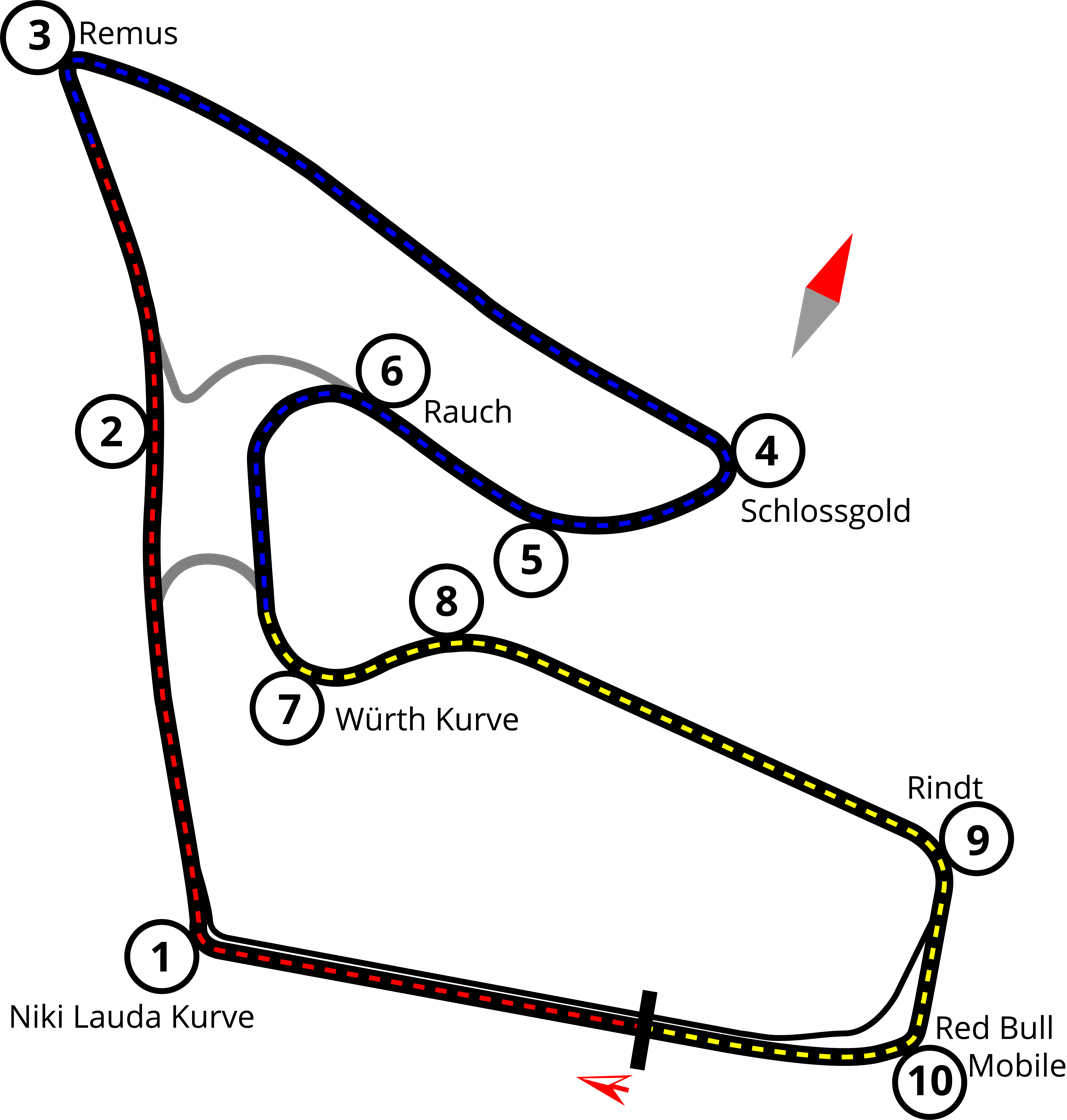
- Layout of the Red Bull Ring
- Location: Red Bull Ring, Spielberg, Styria, Austria
- Course: Permanent racing facility 4.326 km (2.688 mi)

GP3 Series

Race 1
- Date: 2 July 2016
- Laps: 24

Pole position
Driver	(Monaco) Charles Leclerc	ART Grand Prix
- Time: 1:19.041

Podium
First	(Monaco) Charles Leclerc	ART Grand Prix
Second	(Thailand) Alexander Albon	ART Grand Prix
Third	(Netherlands) Nyck de Vries	ART Grand Prix

Fastest lap
Driver	(Monaco) Charles Leclerc	ART Grand Prix
- Time: 1:20.859 (on lap 11)

Race 2
- Date: 3 July 2016
- Laps: 17

Podium
First	(Switzerland) Ralph Boschung	Koiranen GP
Second	(Thailand) Alexander Albon	ART Grand Prix
Third	(Italy) Antonio Fuoco	Trident

Fastest lap
Driver	(Switzerland) Ralph Boschung	Koiranen GP
- Time: 1:35.850 (on lap 10)

The 2016 Red Bull Ring GP3 Series round was a GP3 Series motor race held on 2 and 3 July 2016 at the Red Bull Ring in Austria. It was the second round of the 2016 GP3 Series. The race weekend supported the 2016 Austrian Grand Prix.

== Background ==
Before the weekend commenced, Mahaveer Raghunathan announced that he would call time on his GP3 campaign to focus on his efforts in Auto GP. In the weekend's only practice session, Giuliano Alesi withdrew from the weekend after an accident which saw him unfit to complete the rest of the weekend.

== Classification ==
=== Qualifying ===
It was a dominant session for the ART Grand Prix outfit with the top-three being Charles Leclerc, Alexander Albon and Nyck de Vries. Leclerc achieved a time of 1:19.071, half a second faster than his nearest competitor, Albon.

Pos.	No.	Driver	Team	Time	Gap	Grid
1	1	(Monaco) Charles Leclerc	ART Grand Prix	1:19.041		1
2	3	(Thailand) Alexander Albon	ART Grand Prix	1:19.567	+0.526	2
3	4	(Netherlands) Nyck de Vries	ART Grand Prix	1:19.734	+0.693	3
4	17	(Switzerland) Ralph Boschung	Koiranen GP	1:19.775	+0.734	4
5	2	(Japan) Nirei Fukuzumi	ART Grand Prix	1:19.842	+0.801	5
6	14	(United Kingdom) Matt Parry	Koiranen GP	1:19.868	+0.827	6
7	20	(Colombia) Óscar Tunjo	Jenzer Motorsport	1:19.878	+0.837	7
8	9	(United Kingdom) Jake Dennis	Arden International	1:19.917	+0.876	8
9	27	(United Kingdom) Jake Hughes	DAMS	1:19.925	+0.884	9
10	26	(United States) Santino Ferrucci	DAMS	1:19.980	+0.939	10
11	5	(Italy) Antonio Fuoco	Trident	1:20.080	+1.039	11
12	8	(Thailand) Sandy Stuvik	Trident	1:20.102	+1.061	12
13	10	(Colombia) Tatiana Calderón	Arden International	1:20.104	+1.063	13
14	6	(Poland) Artur Janosz	Trident	1:20.126	+1.085	14
15	11	(United Kingdom) Jack Aitken	Arden International	1:20.227	+1.186	15
16	16	(Russia) Matevos Isaakyan	Koiranen GP	1:20.294	+1.253	16
17	22	(Spain) Álex Palou	Campos Racing	1:20.309	+1.268	17
18	23	(Netherlands) Steijn Schothorst	Campos Racing	1:20.378	+1.337	18
19	28	(Switzerland) Kevin Jörg	DAMS	1:20.429	+1.388	19
20	19	(Slovakia) Richard Gonda	Jenzer Motorsport	1:20.579	+1.538	20
21	18	(Malaysia) Akash Nandy	Jenzer Motorsport	1:20.593	+1.552	21
22	24	(Russia) Konstantin Tereshchenko	Campos Racing	1:20.651	+1.610	22

=== Race 1 ===
Pos.	No.	Driver	Team	Laps	Time/Retired	Grid	Points
1	1	(Monaco) Charles Leclerc	ART Grand Prix	24	35:01.756	1	25 (6)
2	3	(Thailand) Alexander Albon	ART Grand Prix	24	+2.292	2	18
3	4	(Netherlands) Nyck de Vries	ART Grand Prix	24	+8.949	3	15
4	17	(Switzerland) Ralph Boschung	Koiranen GP	24	+11.840	4	12
5	5	(Italy) Antonio Fuoco	Trident	24	+13.131	11	10
6	14	(United Kingdom) Matt Parry	Koiranen GP	24	+15.494	6	8
7	2	(Japan) Nirei Fukuzumi	ART Grand Prix	24	+16.694	5	6
8	27	(United Kingdom) Jake Hughes	DAMS	24	+18.500	9	4
9	11	(United Kingdom) Jack Aitken	Arden International	24	+19.129	15	2
10	8	(Thailand) Sandy Stuvik	Trident	24	+20.726	12	1
11	6	(Poland) Artur Janosz	Trident	24	+43.114	14	
12	18	(Malaysia) Akash Nandy	Jenzer Motorsport	24	+45.524	21	
13	28	(Switzerland) Kevin Jörg	DAMS	19	+45.621	8	
14	20	(Colombia) Óscar Tunjo	Jenzer Motorsport	24	+46.119	7	
15	26	(United States) Santino Ferrucci	DAMS	24	+46.534	10	
16	22	(Spain) Álex Palou	Campos Racing	24	+47.672	17	
17	10	(Colombia) Tatiana Calderón	Arden International	24	+54.379	13	
18	24	(Russia) Konstantin Tereshchenko	Campos Racing	23	+1 Lap	22	
19	19	(Slovakia) Richard Gonda	Jenzer Motorsport	23	+1 Lap	20	
20	23	(Netherlands) Steijn Schothorst	Campos Racing	23	+1 Lap	18	
Ret	16	(Russia) Matevos Isaakyan	Koiranen GP	4	Retired	16	
Ret	9	(United Kingdom) Jake Dennis	Arden International	3	Retired	8	
Fastest lap: (Monaco) Charles Leclerc (ART Grand Prix) – 1:20.859 (on lap 27)

=== Race 2 ===
Pos.	No.	Driver	Team	Laps	Time/Retired	Grid	Points
1	17	(Switzerland) Ralph Boschung	Koiranen GP	17	33:57.642	5	15 (2)
2	3	(Thailand) Alexander Albon	ART Grand Prix	17	+0.841	7	12
3	5	(Italy) Antonio Fuoco	Trident	17	+1.784	4	10
4	4	(Netherlands) Nyck de Vries	ART Grand Prix	17	+2.276	6	8
5	11	(United Kingdom) Jack Aitken	Arden International	17	+2.440	9	6
6	27	(United Kingdom) Jake Hughes	DAMS	17	+3.103	1	4
7	14	(United Kingdom) Matt Parry	Koiranen GP	17	+3.486	3	2
8	8	(Thailand) Sandy Stuvik	Trident	17	+4.802	10	1
9	6	(Poland) Artur Janosz	Trident	17	+5.038	11	
10	26	(United States) Santino Ferrucci	DAMS	17	+6.017	15	
11	22	(Spain) Álex Palou	Campos Racing	17	+6.169	16	
12	23	(Netherlands) Steijn Schothorst	Campos Racing	17	+7.080	20	
13	20	(Colombia) Óscar Tunjo	Jenzer Motorsport	17	+7.349	14	
14	28	(Switzerland) Kevin Jörg	DAMS	17	+9.539	13	
Ret	9	(United Kingdom) Jake Dennis	Arden International	14	Retired	22	
Ret	10	(Colombia) Tatiana Calderón	Arden International	13	Retired	17	
Ret	1	(Monaco) Charles Leclerc	ART Grand Prix	13	Retired	8	
Ret	18	(Malaysia) Akash Nandy	Jenzer Motorsport	10	Retired	12	
Ret	24	(Russia) Konstantin Tereshchenko	Campos Racing	9	Retired	18	
Ret	16	(Russia) Matevos Isaakyan	Trident	8	Retired	21	
Ret	19	(Slovakia) Richard Gonda	Jenzer Motorsport	5	Retired	19	
Ret	2	(Japan) Nirei Fukuzumi	ART Grand Prix	1	Retired	7	
Fastest lap: (Switzerland) Ralph Boschung (Koiranen GP) – 1:35.850 (on lap 10)

== Standings after the round ==
Drivers' Championship standings

	Pos	Driver	Points
	1	(Monaco) Charles Leclerc	58
	2	(Thailand) Alexander Albon	53
1	3	(Italy) Antonio Fuoco	42
5	4	(Netherlands) Nyck de Vries	31
2	5	(United Kingdom) Jake Hughes	31

Teams' Championship standings

	Pos	Team	Points
	1	(France) ART Grand Prix	161
4	2	(Finland) Koiranen GP	44
	3	(Italy) Trident	44
2	4	(France) DAMS	43
	5	(United Kingdom) Arden International	22

- Note: Only the top five positions are included for both sets of standings.

== See also ==
- 2016 Austrian Grand Prix
- 2016 Red Bull Ring GP2 Series round

Previous round: 2016 Catalunya GP3 Series round	GP3 Series; 2016 season	Next round: 2016 Silverstone GP3 Series round
Previous round: 2015 Red Bull Ring GP3 Series round	Red Bull Ring GP3 round	Next round: 2017 Spielberg GP3 Series round
