= Nirei Fukuzumi =

Japanese racing driver

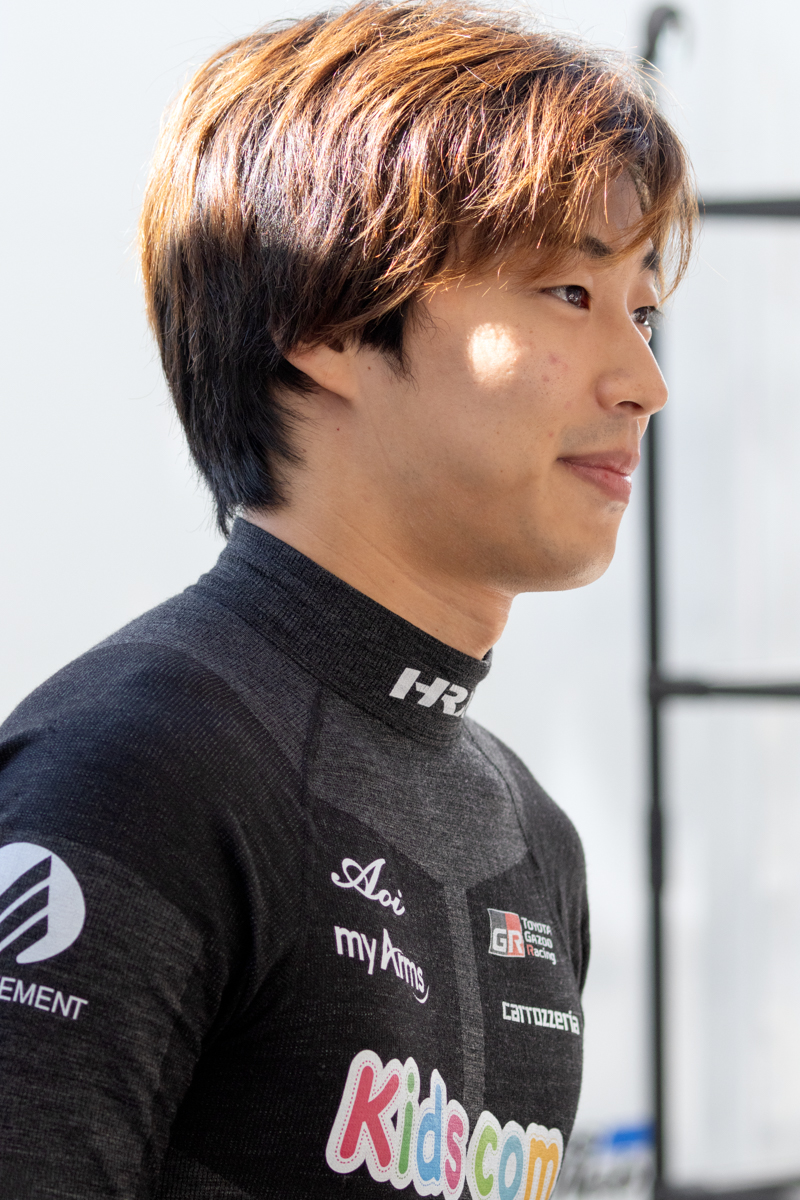
- Fukuzumi at the 2024 Super Formula Suzuka round
- Nationality: (Japan) Japanese
- Born: 24 January 1997 (age 29) Ishii, Tokushima, Japan

Super GT - GT500 career
- Debut season: 2019
- Current team: ROOKIE Racing
- Categorisation: FIA Gold
- Car number: 14
- Former teams: ARTA
- Starts: 56
- Wins: 6
- Podiums: 14
- Poles: 9
- Fastest laps: 4
- Best finish: 2nd in 2021

Super Formula career
- Debut season: 2018
- Current team: ROOKIE Racing
- Car number: 14
- Former teams: Team Mugen, Dandelion Racing, Drago Corse, ThreeBond Racing, KCMG
- Starts: 75
- Wins: 4
- Podiums: 11
- Poles: 4
- Fastest laps: 2
- Best finish: 2nd in 2021

Previous series
- 2018 2016-17 2015 2015, 2019: FIA Formula 2 Championship; GP3 Series; All-Japan Formula Three; Super GT

Championship titles
- 2019: Super GT GT300

Nirei Fukuzumi (福住仁嶺, Fukuzumi Nirei; born 24 January 1997) is a Japanese racing driver affiliated with Toyota Gazoo Racing who currently competes in Super GT for ROOKIE Racing and in Super Formula for KCMG. He won the GT300 class championship in Super GT in 2019, driving for ARTA alongside series veteran Shinichi Takagi, and is a race winner in the GP3 Series and Super Formula.

Fukuzumi was previously a factory driver for Honda until 2023, and spent much of his junior racing career as a member of the Honda Formula Dream Project, competing internationally in the GP3 Series and FIA Formula 2 Championship. He is also a former member of the McLaren Driver Development Programme and the Red Bull Junior Team.

== Early and personal life ==
Fukuzumi comes from a rather unusual background for a racing driver; his father Shūhō is the chief priest of Sanbōin, a Shingon Buddhist temple in his hometown of Ishii.

== Career ==
=== Karting ===
Fukuzumi drove a kart for the first time at the age of five and began his karting career in 2006. He remained in karting until 2013, finishing second to Ukyo Sasahara in the All-Japan Junior Karting Championship in 2009 and concluding his career by taking the All-Japan Karting Championship title in the top-level KF1 class in 2013. He also made a handful of appearances internationally, most notably finishing second in the ROK Cup International Final in 2012.

=== Lower formulae ===
In 2014, Fukuzumi began to compete in open-wheel racing, moving up to Japanese F3 the next year. He won four races and finished fourth in the standings.

=== GP3 Series ===
In 2016, Nirei débuted in the GP3 Series with ART Grand Prix, scoring three podium finishes and finishing seventh in the championship. Fukuzumi stayed on for another season of GP3 in 2017. He racked up two victories, both coming at feature races, and ended up third in the standings, only behind teammates George Russell and Jack Aitken. In 2017, he was part of McLaren Young Driver Programme as he's part of Honda Junior Program.

=== FIA Formula 2 Championship ===
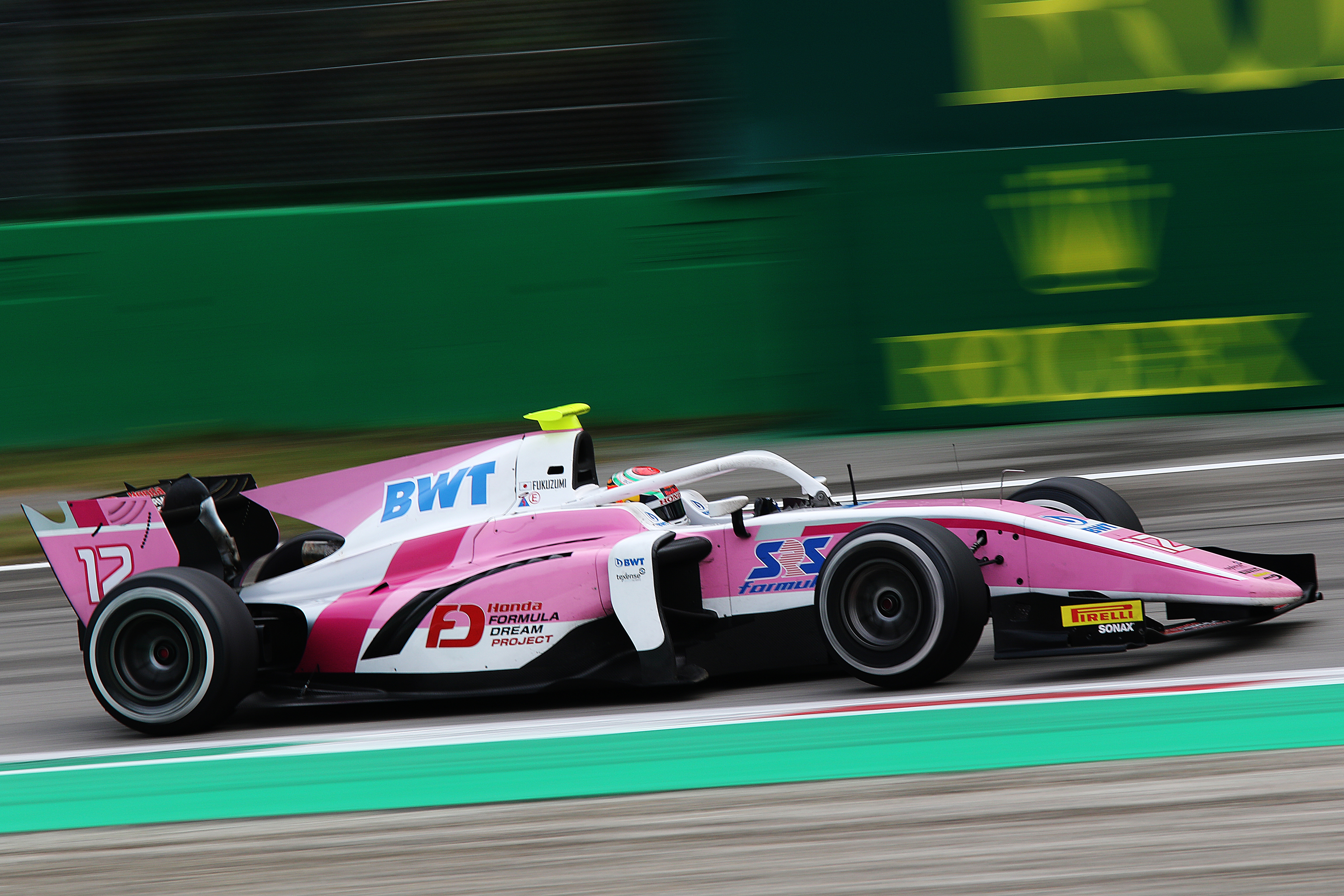
Fukuzumi at the 2018 Monza Formula 2 round

Fukuzumi made his Formula 2 debut in 2018 with BWT Arden, partnering Maximilian Günther. In that season, he managed to join Red Bull Junior Team. Fukuzumi scored a total of 17 points, finishing 17th, three positions behind Günther in the championship. After this unfortunate season, Red Bull dropped him from the Academy.

=== Super Formula ===
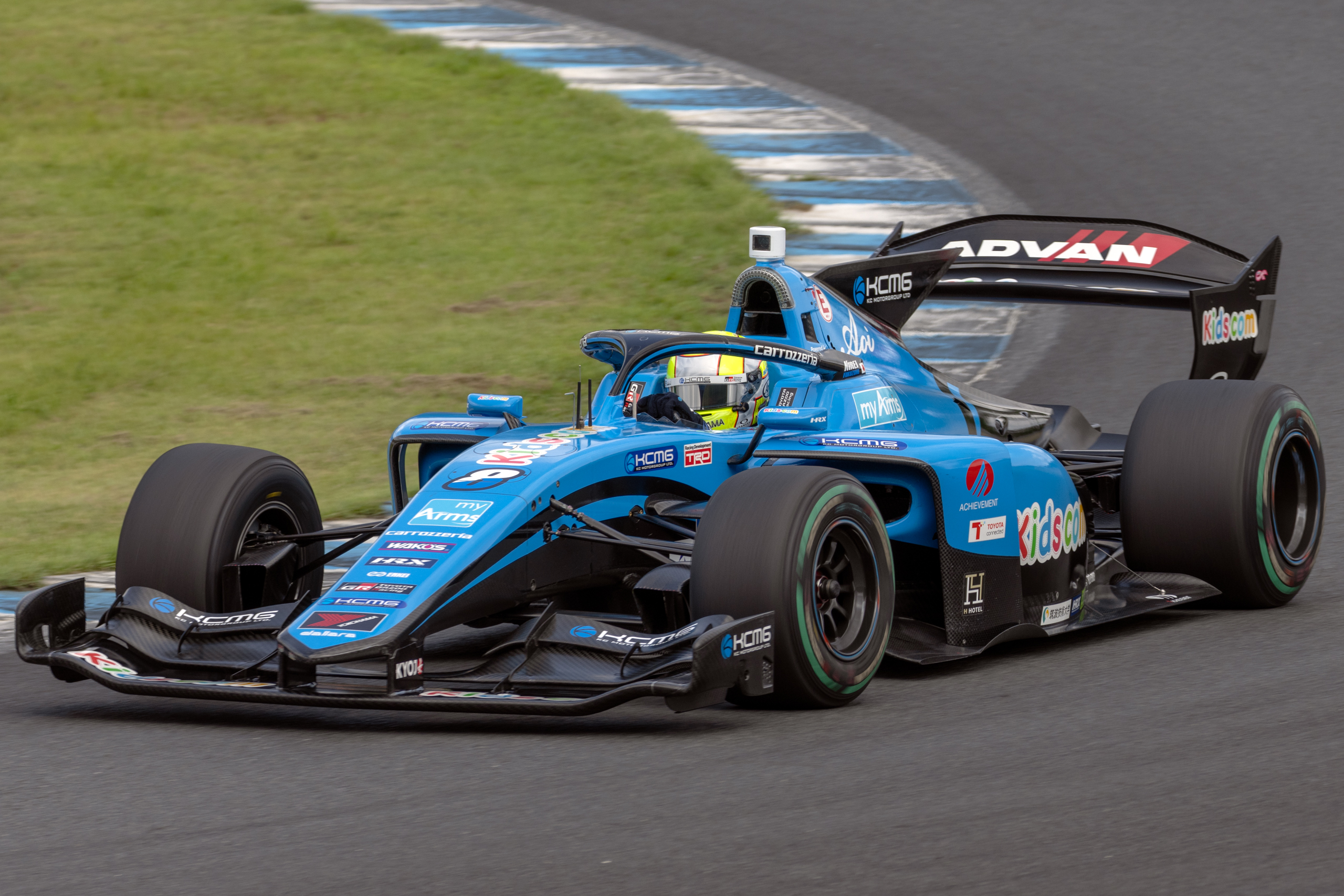
Fukuzumi at Mobility Resort Motegi in 2024

==== Honda ====
While the main focus was to race in Formula 2 for 2018, Fukuzumi competed in Super Formula with Team Mugen for four rounds. After three seasons in Europe, Fukuzumi returned to Japan, and competed in Super Formula with Dandelion Racing. Fukuzumi had his best season by far, managed to claim runners up in the standings for Super Formula with two wins & one pole to his name in that season. For 2022, Fukuzumi moves from Front runner Dandelion Racing to Drago Corse for Super Formula, while for Super GT stays with ARTA. In 2023, Fukuzumi continues to stay at ThreeBond Racing. Fukuzumi continues to do well in Threebond where collecting couple of points, and qualiflying to Q2 very often, with 16th place.

==== Toyota ====
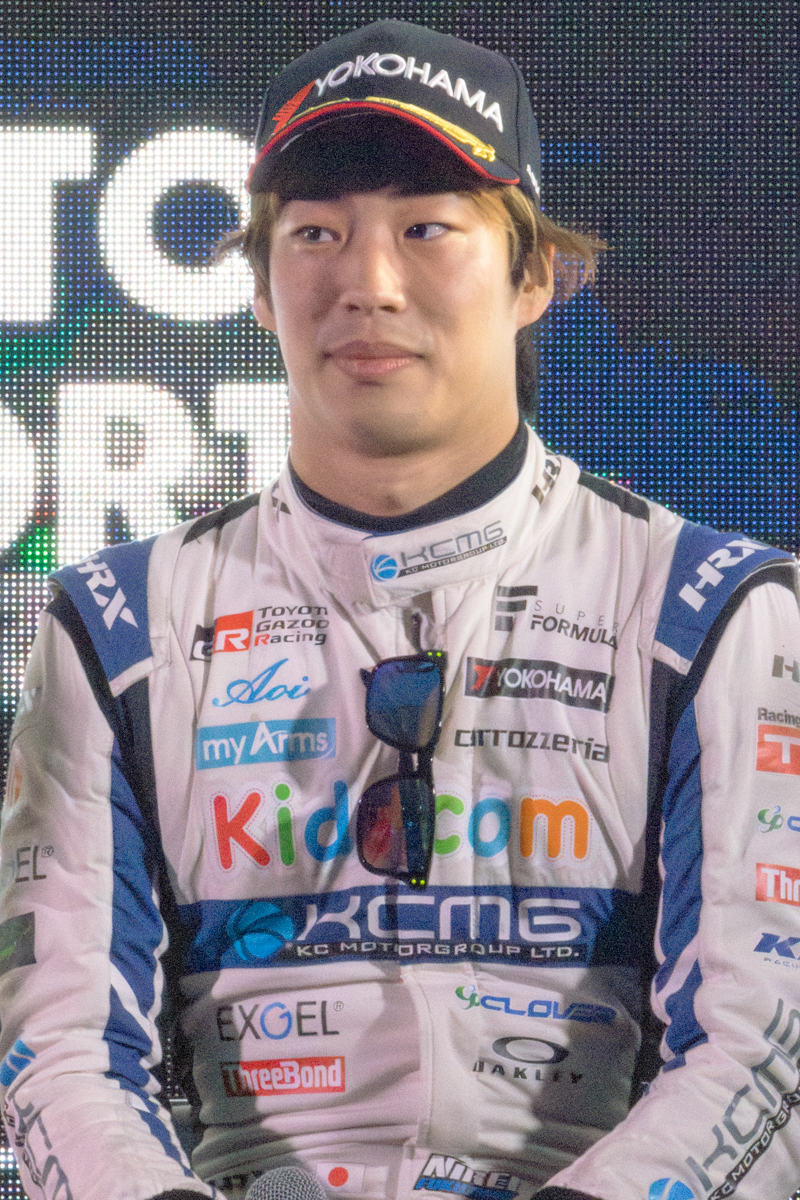
Fukuzumi at Suzuka Circuit in November 2024

Fukuzumi left Honda after being contracted by the manufacturer since his junior years, to join Toyota and drive the No. 8 entry for KCMG alongside Kamui Kobayashi.

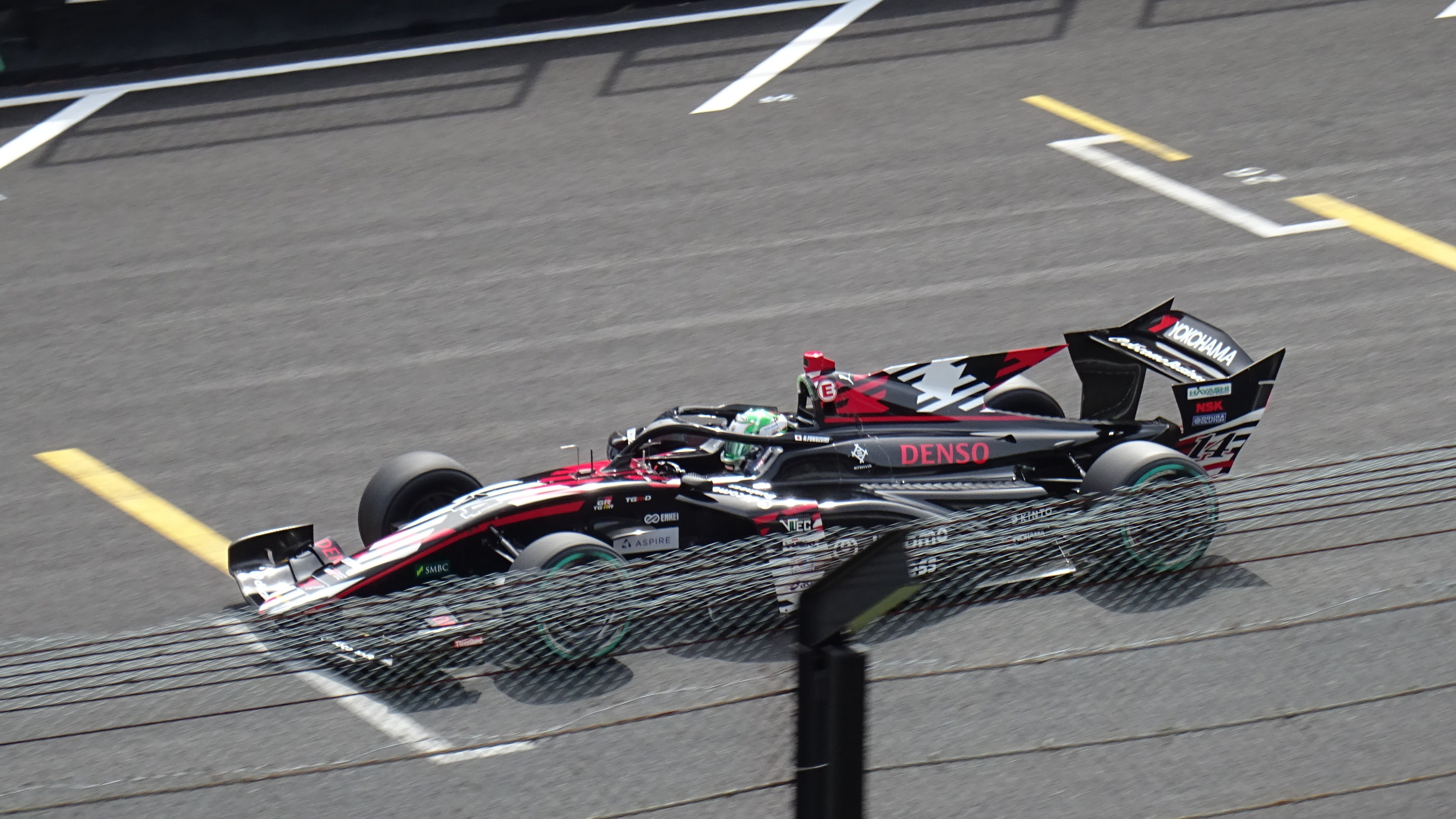
Fukuzumi at Suzuka Circuit in 2026

In 2026, Fukuzumi joined Rookie Racing and quickly made history for the team, scoring their first ever podium at Mobility Resort Motegi, and the following round scoring the team's first ever win at Suzuka Circuit.

=== Super GT ===
==== GT300 ====
Fukuzumi make his Super GT debut in GT300 Class with ARTA as Shinichi Takagi's teammate. In that season, he managed to claim the Super GT GT300 Title, while in Super Formula full debut managed to get seventh place in the standings.

==== GT500 ====
In 2020, Fukuzumi stayed with the same team but promoted to GT500 class in Super GT with Tomoki Nojiri as his teammate. For 2021, he stayed with the same team in both series. And in 2021 with one win and he and Nojiri Fukuzumi finished second in the points. Fukuzumi continued to compete in Super GT with ARTA, but this time he moved to the new 16 car after ARTA work together with Mugen Team, where he was paired with Hiroki Otsu. Meanwhile Fukuzumi, and Otsu claimed their car number 16 its maiden win, alongside three podiums, and a pole position. Both of them initially fought for the title, but fell short where they finished outside the top-three, and ended up in fourth place.

After he left Honda, Fukuzumi would drive for TGR Team Eneos ROOKIE alongside 2019 GT500 champion, Kazuya Oshima.

== Karting record ==
=== Karting career summary ===
Season	Series	Team	Position
2010	Rotax Max Challenge Grand Finals — Junior		30th
2011	ROK Cup International Final — Junior ROK		5th
2011	Rotax Max Challenge Grand Finals — Junior	Eiko Japan	5th
2012	ROK Cup International Final — Junior ROK		2nd
2012	CIK-FIA European Championship — KF2	Kosmic Racing Dept	16th
2012	CIK-FIA World Cup — KF2		21st
2012	CIK-FIA Asia Pacific Championship — KF2		5th
2013	CIK-FIA World Championship — KF2		33rd

== Racing record ==
=== Career summary ===
Season	Series	Team	Races	Wins	Poles	F/Laps	Podiums	Points	Position
2014	JAF Formula 4 East - FC	HFDP Racing	5	1	–**	–**	4	72	**1st**
2014	JAF Formula 4 West - FC	HFDP Racing	6	3	–**	–**	5	100	**1st**
2014	JAF Formula 4 Overall - FC	HFDP Racing	11	4	–**	–**	9	172	**1st**
2015	Japanese Formula 3 Championship	HFDP Racing	17	2	3	3	6	72	4th
2015	Super GT - GT300	Autobacs Racing Team Aguri	1	0	0	0	0	0	NC†
2016	GP3 Series	ART Grand Prix	18	0	0	0	3	91	7th
2017	GP3 Series	ART Grand Prix	14	2	2	0	6	134	**3rd**
2018	FIA Formula 2 Championship	BWT Arden	23	0	0	0	0	17	17th
2018	Super Formula	Team Mugen	4	0	0	1	0	0	20th
2019	Super GT - GT300	ARTA	8	1	1	0	3	69.5	**1st**
2019	Super Formula	Docomo Team Dandelion Racing	7	0	0	0	1	18	7th
2020	Super GT - GT500	ARTA	8	1	3	1	3	54	5th
2020	Super Formula	Docomo Team Dandelion Racing	7	0	0	2	1	29	8th
2021	Super GT - GT500	ARTA	8	2	1	0	2	60	**2nd**
2021	Super Formula	Docomo Team Dandelion Racing	7	1	1	0	3	55	**2nd**
2022	Super GT - GT500	ARTA	8	1	0	0	1	24	12th
2022	Super Formula	ThreeBond Drago Corse	10	0	0	0	0	3	19th
2023	Super GT - GT500	ARTA	8	1	2	1	3	53	4th
2023	Super Formula	ThreeBond Racing	9	0	0	0	0	9	16th
2024	Super Formula	Kids com Team KCMG	9	0	2	0	2	62	6th
2024	Super GT - GT500	TGR Team ENEOS ROOKIE	8	0	0	0	1	38	11th
2024	Super Taikyu - ST-Q	ORC ROOKIE Racing	1	0	0	0	0	N/A	NC‡
2025	Super GT - GT500	TGR Team ENEOS ROOKIE	8	1	2	1	3	54.5	4th
2025	Super Formula	Kids com Team KCMG	12	0	0	0	1	39	9th
2025	SRO Japan Cup - GT3	K-tunes Racing	8	0	0	0	0	38	9th
2025	Super Taikyu - ST-Q	Toyota Gazoo Rookie Racing	2	1	0	0	1	N/A‡	NC‡
2025	Nürburgring Langstrecken-Serie - SP8T	KCMG							
2026	Super GT - GT500	TGR Team ENEOS ROOKIE	8	0	1	1	1	37	10th
2026	Super Formula	NTT Docomo Business Rookie	10	2	1	0	3	63	4th*
2026	24 Hours of Nürburgring - SP9 Pro	KCMG	1	0	0	0	0	N/A	DNF
2026	Nürburgring Langstrecken-Serie - SP9	KCMG							
2026	SRO Japan Cup - GT3	K-tunes Racing	4	1	1	0	1	26	11th
2026	Super Taikyu - ST-Q	Toyota Gazoo Rookie Racing							

** The FC class was a class using modified Formula Challenge Japan's FC106 chassis and running with the JAF Formula 4's "C" class, an upper-grade class. So, there were neither pole position nor fastest lap.
^{†} As Fukuzumi was a guest driver, he was ineligible to score championship points.
^{‡} Team standings.
* Season still in progress.

=== Complete Japanese Formula 3 Championship results ===
(key) (Races in bold indicate pole position) (Races in italics indicate fastest lap)

Year	Entrant	1	2	3	4	5	6	7	8	9	10	11	12	13	14	15	16	17	Pos	Points
2015	HFDP Racing	SUZ; 1; 5	SUZ; 2; 7	MOT1; 1; 4	MOT1; 2; 4	MOT1; 3; 2	OKA1; 1; 7	OKA1; 1; 5	**FUJ1**; **1**; 5	FUJ1; 2; 4	OKA2; 1; 4	OKA2; 2; 5	FUJ2; 1; 2	FUJ2; 2; 3	**MOT2**; **1**; 1	**MOT2**; **2**; 1	SUG; 1; 3	SUG; 2; 5	4th	72

=== Complete GP3 Series results ===
(key) (Races in bold indicate pole position) (Races in italics indicate fastest lap)

Year	Entrant	1	2	3	4	5	6	7	8	9	10	11	12	13	14	15	16	17	18	Pos	Points
2016	ART Grand Prix	CAT; FEA; 3	CAT; SPR; 13	RBR; FEA; 7	RBR; SPR; Ret	SIL; FEA; 11	SIL; SPR; 7	HUN; FEA; 4	HUN; SPR; 4	HOC; FEA; Ret	HOC; SPR; 11	SPA; FEA; Ret	SPA; SPR; 15	MNZ; FEA; 5	MNZ; SPR; Ret	SEP; FEA; 7	SEP; SPR; 2	YMC; FEA; 5	YMC; SPR; 3	7th	91
2017	ART Grand Prix	CAT; FEA; 1	CAT; SPR; 6	RBR; FEA; 3	RBR; SPR; 3	SIL; FEA; Ret	SIL; SPR; 16	HUN; FEA; 2	HUN; SPR; Ret	SPA; FEA; 3	SPA; SPR; 4	**MNZ**; **FEA**; DNS	MNZ; SPR; C	**JER**; **FEA**; 1	JER; SPR; 5	YMC; FEA; 15	YMC; SPR; 14			3rd	134

=== Complete FIA Formula 2 Championship results ===
(key) (Races in bold indicate pole position) (Races in italics indicate points for the fastest lap of top ten finishers)

Year	Entrant	1	2	3	4	5	6	7	8	9	10	11	12	13	14	15	16	17	18	19	20	21	22	23	24	DC	Points
2018	BWT Arden	BHR; FEA; 18	BHR; SPR; 8	BAK; FEA; 13	BAK; SPR; 12	CAT; FEA; 11	CAT; SPR; Ret	MON; FEA; 10	MON; SPR; 11†	LEC; FEA; 9	LEC; SPR; 12	RBR; FEA; 9	RBR; SPR; 9	SIL; FEA; Ret	SIL; SPR; DNS	HUN; FEA; 10	HUN; SPR; 6	SPA; FEA; Ret	SPA; SPR; 17	MNZ; FEA; 14	MNZ; SPR; 13	SOC; FEA; 8	SOC; SPR; 7	YMC; FEA; Ret	YMC; SPR; 12	17th	17

^{†} Driver did not finish the race, but was classified as he completed over 90% of the race distance.

=== Complete Super GT results ===
(key) (Races in bold indicate pole position; races in italics indicate fastest lap)

Year	Team	Car	Class	1	2	3	4	5	6	7	8	9	DC	Points
2015	Autobacs Racing Team Aguri	Honda CR-Z	GT300	OKA	FUJ	CHA	FUJ	SUZ; 12	SUG	AUT	MOT		NC††	0††
2019	ARTA	Honda NSX GT3 Evo	GT300	**OKA**; 2‡	FUJ; 2	SUZ; 6	CHA; 9	FUJ; 6	AUT; 6	SUG; 1	MOT; 4		1st	69.5
2020	ARTA	Honda NSX-GT	GT500	FUJ; 8	**FUJ**; 14	SUZ; 13	MOT; Ret	**FUJ**; 3	**SUZ**; 3	MOT; 1	FUJ; 5		5th	54
2021	ARTA	Honda NSX-GT	GT500	OKA; 7	FUJ; 8	MOT; 5	SUZ; 11	**SUG**; 10	AUT; 1	MOT; 1	FUJ; 6		2nd	60
2022	ARTA	Honda NSX-GT	GT500	OKA; 10	FUJ; 1‡	SUZ; 7	FUJ; 5	SUZ; 13	SUG; 13	AUT; 11	MOT; 8		12th	24
2023	ARTA	Honda NSX-GT	GT500	OKA; 11	FUJ; 10	SUZ; 7	FUJ; 3	**SUZ**; 1	SUG; 12	**AUT**; 2	MOT; 12		4th	53
2024	TGR Team ENEOS ROOKIE	Toyota GR Supra GT500	GT500	OKA; NC	FUJ; 8	SUZ; 2	FUJ; 4	SUG; 9	AUT; 9	MOT; 13†	SUZ; 6		11th	38
2025	TGR Team ENEOS ROOKIE	Toyota GR Supra GT500	GT500	**OKA**; 2	FUJ; 6	SEP; 9	FS1 (Ret)	**FS2**; 1	SUZ; 2	SUG; 7	AUT; 9	MOT; 14	4th	54.5
2026	TGR Team ENEOS ROOKIE	Toyota GR Supra GT500	GT500	OKA; 4	**FUJ**; 2	FUJ; 7	SUZ; 8	SUG; 11	AUT; 13	MOT; DSQ	MOT; 5		10th	37

^{†} Driver did not finish, but was classified as he completed over 90% of the race distance.
^{††} As Fukuzumi was a guest driver, he was ineligible to score championship points.
^{‡} Half points awarded as less than 75% of race distance was completed.
^{(Number)} Driver did not take part in this sprint race, points are still awarded for the teammate's result.

=== Complete Super Formula results ===
(key) (Races in bold indicate pole position) (Races in italics indicate fastest lap)

Year	Team	Engine	1	2	3	4	5	6	7	8	9	10	11	12	DC	Points
2018	Team Mugen	Honda	SUZ; Ret	AUT	SUG	FUJ	MOT; 17	OKA; 18	SUZ; 12						20th	0
2019	Docomo Team Dandelion Racing	Honda	SUZ; 11	AUT; 5	SUG; 5	FUJ; 9	MOT; 5	OKA; Ret	SUZ; 3						7th	18
2020	Docomo Team Dandelion Racing	Honda	MOT; 5	OKA; 8	SUG; 10	AUT; 9^{2}	SUZ; Ret^{3}	SUZ; 2	FUJ; 16						8th	29
2021	Docomo Team Dandelion Racing	Honda	FUJ; 3	**SUZ**; Ret^{1}	AUT; 13	SUG; 1	MOT; Ret	MOT; 12	SUZ; 1^{3}						2nd	55
2022	ThreeBond Drago Corse	Honda	FUJ; Ret	FUJ; 16	SUZ; 17	AUT; DSQ	SUG; 8	FUJ; 11	MOT; Ret	MOT; Ret	SUZ; 15	SUZ; Ret			19th	3
2023	ThreeBond Racing	Honda	FUJ; Ret	FUJ; 7	SUZ; 10	AUT; 8	SUG; 16	FUJ; 16	MOT; 14	SUZ; 9‡	SUZ; Ret				16th	9
2024	Kids Com Team KCMG	Toyota	SUZ; 6	AUT; 8	SUG; 13	**FUJ**; 4^{1}	MOT; 9	**FUJ**; 5^{1}	FUJ; 2^{3}	SUZ; 6	SUZ; 3				6th	62
2025	Kids com Team KCMG	Toyota	SUZ; Ret	SUZ; 14	MOT; 5	MOT; 16	AUT; 9	FUJ; 4	FUJ; Ret	SUG; 3	FUJ; 12	SUZ; 7	SUZ; 9	SUZ; 6	9th	39
2026	NTT Docomo Business Rookie	Toyota	MOT; 19	MOT; 3	SUZ; 10	**SUZ**; 1^{1}	FUJ; 23	FUJ; 19	FUJ; 8	SUG; 1	FUJ; 6	FUJ; 11	SUZ	SUZ	4th*	63*

^{‡} Half points awarded as less than 75% of race distance was completed. ^{*} Season still in progress.

Sporting positions
Preceded by Haruki Kurosawa; Naoya Gamou	Super GT; GT300 Champion; 2019; With: Shinichi Takagi	Succeeded by João Paulo de Oliveira; Kiyoto Fujinami
