= 2013 Eurocup Formula Renault 2.0 =

Motor racing competition

Seasons
- ← 2012 2014 →

The 2013 Eurocup Formula Renault 2.0 season was a multi-event motor racing championship for open wheel, formula racing cars held across Europe. The championship features drivers competing in 2 litre Formula Renault single seat race cars that conform to the technical regulations for the championship. The 2013 season is the 23rd Eurocup Formula Renault 2.0 season organized by the Renault Sport and the first season with the new generation car. The season began at Ciudad del Motor de Aragón on 27 April and finished on 20 October at Circuit de Barcelona-Catalunya. The series formed part of the World Series by Renault meetings at seven double header events.

Tech 1 Racing's Pierre Gasly won the championship title after wins at Moscow, Budapest and Le Castellet. His rival Oliver Rowland had the same number of wins and fought for the title until he received a drive-through penalty, as a result of a collision with Gasly in the final race of the season. ART Junior's Esteban Ocon took wins at Le Castellet and Barcelona to finish in third position in the drivers' standings. Nyck de Vries, Ignazio D'Agosto, Luca Ghiotto and Matthieu Vaxivière were also race-winners during the season. Gasly, with the help of Egor Orudzhev and Vaxivière, accrued enough points to confirm the teams' championship title for Tech 1 Racing.

== Teams and drivers ==
On 7 November 2012, twelve teams were preselected for entry into the 2013 season, with BVM Racing and Atech Reid GP on the reserve list.

Team	No.	Driver name	Class	Rounds
(Germany) Josef Kaufmann Racing	1	(Netherlands) Steijn Schothorst		All
(Germany) Josef Kaufmann Racing	2	(Sweden) Gustav Malja	J	All
(Germany) Josef Kaufmann Racing	3	(Colombia) Óscar Tunjo	J	All
(Finland) Koiranen GP	4	(Netherlands) Nyck de Vries	J	All
(Finland) Koiranen GP	5	(Brazil) Guilherme Silva	J	All
(Finland) Koiranen GP	6	(Brazil) Victor Franzoni		All
(United Kingdom) Fortec Motorsports	7	(United Kingdom) Jake Dennis	J	All
(United Kingdom) Fortec Motorsports	8	(Finland) Mikko Pakkari	J	All
(United Kingdom) Fortec Motorsports	9	(United Arab Emirates) Ed Jones	J	1, 3–7
(United Kingdom) Fortec Motorsports	49	(United Kingdom) Jack Aitken		4
(United Kingdom) Fortec Motorsports	49	(United States) Ryan Tveter		5–6
(United Kingdom) Fortec Motorsports	50	(United Kingdom) Matt Parry		6
(France) Tech 1 Racing	10	(France) Pierre Gasly		All
(France) Tech 1 Racing	11	(Russia) Egor Orudzhev	J	All
(France) Tech 1 Racing	12	(France) Matthieu Vaxivière		1–6
(France) ART Junior Team	14	(France) Alexandre Baron		1–4
(France) ART Junior Team	14	(France) Nicolas Jamin		6
(France) ART Junior Team	15	(France) Esteban Ocon	J	All
(France) ART Junior Team	16	(France) Andrea Pizzitola		All
(Luxembourg) RC Formula	17	(France) Aurélien Panis		1–3
(Luxembourg) RC Formula	17	(Italy) Mattia Vita	J	6
(Luxembourg) RC Formula	17	(France) John Filippi		7
(Luxembourg) RC Formula	18	(Belgium) Benjamin Bailly		All
(Luxembourg) RC Formula	19	(South Africa) Naomi Schiff		1
(Luxembourg) RC Formula	19	(Russia) Roman Mavlanov		3–6
(Luxembourg) RC Formula	19	(Russia) Roman Beregech		7
(Austria) Interwetten Racing	20	(Russia) Konstantin Tereshchenko		1–3
(Austria) Interwetten Racing	21	(Mexico) Alejandro Abogado		1–2, 4–7
(Austria) Interwetten Racing	22	(Germany) Stefan Wackerbauer	J	1–2
(Austria) Interwetten Racing	22	(Poland) Aleksander Bosak		4
(Austria) Interwetten Racing	22	(Portugal) Francisco Mora	J	5
(Austria) Interwetten Racing	22	(Austria) Bernd Herndlhofer		6
(Netherlands) Manor MP Motorsport	23	(United Kingdom) Melville McKee	J	1
(Netherlands) Manor MP Motorsport	23	(United Kingdom) Jack Aitken		3, 7
(Netherlands) Manor MP Motorsport	23	(United Kingdom) Gregor Ramsay		5–6
(Netherlands) Manor MP Motorsport	24	(United Kingdom) Oliver Rowland		All
(Netherlands) Manor MP Motorsport	25	(Argentina) Javier Merlo		1–4
(Netherlands) Manor MP Motorsport	25	(France) Léo Roussel	J	6–7
(France) ARTA Engineering	26	(France) William Vermont		All
(France) ARTA Engineering	27	(France) Simon Tirman	J	1–4
(France) ARTA Engineering	28	(France) Léo Roussel	J	1–5
(France) ARTA Engineering	28	(France) Joffrey De Narda		6
(France) ARTA Engineering	43	(France) Joffrey De Narda		2
(France) ARTA Engineering	43	(France) Simon Gachet		5
(Belgium) KTR	29	(Japan) Yu Kanamaru		All
(Belgium) KTR	30	(Thailand) Alexander Albon	J	All
(Belgium) KTR	31	(Italy) Ignazio D'Agosto		All
(Italy) Prema Powerteam	32	(Italy) Luca Ghiotto	J	All
(Italy) Prema Powerteam	33	(Brazil) Bruno Bonifacio		All
(Italy) Prema Powerteam	34	(Italy) Antonio Fuoco		2
(Italy) Prema Powerteam	34	(France) Aurélien Panis		4–7
(Switzerland) Jenzer Motorsport	35	(Switzerland) Kevin Jörg	J	All
(Switzerland) Jenzer Motorsport	36	(Argentina) Marcos Siebert	J	1–2, 4–7
(Switzerland) Jenzer Motorsport	36	(Russia) Denis Korneev		3
(Switzerland) Jenzer Motorsport	37	(Switzerland) Levin Amweg	J	All
(Spain) AV Formula	40	(France) Victor Sendin	J	1
(Spain) AV Formula	41	(New Zealand) Nick Cassidy		1
(Italy) Euronova	44	(United Kingdom) Gregor Ramsay		2, 7
(Italy) Euronova	45	(Venezuela) Javier Amado		2
(Italy) Euronova	46	(Japan) Ukyo Sasahara		2, 7
(Finland) SMP Racing	47	(Estonia) Hans Villemi		2–3
(Finland) SMP Racing	48	(Poland) Aleksander Bosak		2–3
(United Kingdom) Mark Burdett Motorsport	51	(United Kingdom) Raoul Owens		7

Icon	Class
J	Junior Class

== Race calendar and results ==
The calendar for the 2013 season was announced on 20 October 2012, the day before the end of the 2012 season. All seven rounds formed meetings of the 2013 World Series by Renault season.

Round		Circuit	Date	Pole position	Fastest lap	Winning driver	Winning team
1	R1	(Spain) Ciudad del Motor de Aragón, Alcañiz	27 April	(France) Matthieu Vaxivière	(France) Matthieu Vaxivière	(France) Matthieu Vaxivière	(France) Tech 1 Racing
1	R2	(Spain) Ciudad del Motor de Aragón, Alcañiz	28 April	(France) Matthieu Vaxivière	(France) Matthieu Vaxivière	(France) Matthieu Vaxivière	(France) Tech 1 Racing
2	R1	(Belgium) Circuit de Spa-Francorchamps	1 June	(United Kingdom) Jake Dennis	(Brazil) Bruno Bonifacio	(United Kingdom) Oliver Rowland	(Netherlands) Manor MP Motorsport
2	R2	(Belgium) Circuit de Spa-Francorchamps	2 June	(Italy) Antonio Fuoco	(France) Pierre Gasly	(Italy) Luca Ghiotto	(Italy) Prema Powerteam
3	R1	(Russia) Moscow Raceway	22 June	(France) Pierre Gasly	(United Kingdom) Oliver Rowland	(France) Pierre Gasly	(France) Tech 1 Racing
3	R2	(Russia) Moscow Raceway	23 June	(France) Esteban Ocon	(United Kingdom) Oliver Rowland	(United Kingdom) Oliver Rowland	(Netherlands) Manor MP Motorsport
4	R1	(Austria) Red Bull Ring	20 July	(United Kingdom) Alexander Albon	(United Kingdom) Alexander Albon	(Italy) Ignazio D'Agosto	(Belgium) KTR
4	R2	(Austria) Red Bull Ring	21 July	(United Kingdom) Oliver Rowland	(France) Pierre Gasly	(United Kingdom) Oliver Rowland	(Netherlands) Manor MP Motorsport
5	R1	(Hungary) Hungaroring, Mogyoród	14 September	(France) Pierre Gasly	(Italy) Luca Ghiotto	(France) Pierre Gasly	(France) Tech 1 Racing
5	R2	(Hungary) Hungaroring, Mogyoród	15 September	(United Kingdom) Oliver Rowland	(Netherlands) Nyck de Vries	(Netherlands) Nyck de Vries	(Finland) Koiranen GP
6	R1	(France) Circuit Paul Ricard, Le Castellet	28 September	(France) Pierre Gasly	(Brazil) Bruno Bonifacio	(France) Pierre Gasly	(France) Tech 1 Racing
6	R2	(France) Circuit Paul Ricard, Le Castellet	29 September	(Italy) Luca Ghiotto	(France) Esteban Ocon	(France) Esteban Ocon	(France) ART Junior Team
7	R1	(Spain) Circuit de Barcelona-Catalunya, Montmeló	19 October	(Netherlands) Nyck de Vries	(Netherlands) Nyck de Vries	(Netherlands) Nyck de Vries	(Finland) Koiranen GP
7	R2	(Spain) Circuit de Barcelona-Catalunya, Montmeló	20 October	(France) Pierre Gasly	(United Kingdom) Jake Dennis	(France) Esteban Ocon	(France) ART Junior Team

== Championship standings ==
- Points for both championships are awarded as follows:

1st	2nd	3rd	4th	5th	6th	7th	8th	9th	10th
25	18	15	12	10	8	6	4	2	1

=== Drivers' Championship ===
Pos	Driver	ARA (Spain)		SPA (Belgium)		MSC (Russia)		RBR (Austria)		HUN (Hungary)		LEC (France)		CAT (Spain)		Points
Pos	Driver	1	2	3	4	5	6	7	8	9	10	11	12	13	14	Points
1	(France) Pierre Gasly	3	9	2	2	**1**	Ret	7	2	**1**	5	**1**	5	3	**6**	195
2	(United Kingdom) Oliver Rowland	10	3	1	33	2	1	5	**1**	8	**3**	6	3	2	28	179
3	(France) Esteban Ocon	2	6	8	7	4	**2**	11	14	2	4	9	1	7	1	159
4	(United Kingdom) Jake Dennis	5	5	**6**	5	11	5	4	4	5	9	4	2	23†	4	130
5	(Netherlands) Nyck de Vries	9	7	Ret	8	10	16	15	12	3	1	3	12	**1**	2	113
6	(Colombia) Óscar Tunjo	8	4	3	6	18	4	8	6	7	2	Ret	10	8	8	99
7	(Russia) Egor Orudzhev	7	2	29	Ret	22	7	Ret	26	4	8	7	9	4	5	78
8	(Italy) Ignazio D'Agosto	21	8	Ret	Ret	25	3	1	8	Ret	6	5	15	6	13	74
9	(Italy) Luca Ghiotto	14	25	31	1	5	9	32	7	6	11	2	**22**	27	23	69
10	(France) Matthieu Vaxivière	**1**	**1**	11	14	7	12	27	21	11	15	16	29			57
11	(United Arab Emirates) Ed Jones	Ret	14			20	10	3	3	27	7	Ret	6	Ret	17	45
12	(France) William Vermont	4	10	7	10	19	18	2	11	Ret	16	10	Ret	Ret	29	42
13	(France) Andrea Pizzitola	15	15	4	28	13	15	20	17	10	10	19	Ret	5	3	39
14	(Netherlands) Steijn Schothorst	6	22	Ret	Ret	3	14	6	10	13	12	14	13	15	12	32
15	(Brazil) Bruno Bonifacio	12	11	15	3	6	8	31	Ret	9	14	18	16	24†	Ret	29
16	(United Kingdom) Alexander Albon	22	Ret	14	27	8	11	**10**	5	20	17	Ret	17	Ret	7	22
17	(Finland) Mikko Pakari	16	17	10	9	9	6	16	27	14	21	28	14	19	11	17
18	(France) Aurélien Panis	23	23	Ret	18	29	25	Ret	15	17	18	Ret	4	18	9	14
19	(Brazil) Victor Franzoni	19	13	12	13	26	17	19	Ret	Ret	23	12	8	10	30†	7
20	(Sweden) Gustav Malja	33	19	19	Ret	17	19	12	Ret	26	13	8	23	13	22	4
21	(Germany) Stefan Wackerbauer	13	18	9	Ret											4
22	(Switzerland) Levin Amweg	Ret	27	13	30	28	Ret	17	9	21	30	Ret	25	11	15	2
23	(Switzerland) Kevin Jörg	25	16	18	21	16	24	22	16	12	Ret	17	Ret	9	Ret	2
24	(Argentina) Marcos Siebert	30	Ret	20	11			23	24	18	24	20	11	12	16	2
25	(Brazil) Guilherme Silva	20	12	Ret	12	Ret	20	14	Ret	16	22	11	19	14	14	0
26	(United Kingdom) Melville McKee	11	20													0
27	(France) Alexandre Baron	17	26	Ret	15	12	13	18	20							0
28	(Belgium) Benjamin Bailly	29	28	Ret	24	15	21	25	22	22	20	13	Ret	17	Ret	0
29	(Russia) Roman Mavlanov					DSQ	29	13	Ret	15	Ret	DSQ	DSQ	EX	EX	0
30	(Argentina) Javier Merlo	26	30	23	23	14	27	21	18							0
31	(Japan) Yu Kanamaru	35	Ret	16	22	32	28	28	23	25	19	23	Ret	Ret	20	0
32	(France) Léo Roussel	18	DNS	24	25	30	32	26	19	23	28	24	21	21	21	0
33	(Russia) Konstantin Tereshchenko	27	21	32	19	27	22									0
34	(France) Simon Tirman	28	29	30	20	21	26	24	DNS			26	24	Ret	26	0
35	(Mexico) Alejandro Abogado	32	32	28	32			30	Ret	28	Ret	27	27	Ret	Ret	0
36	(South Africa) Naomi Schiff	34	DNS													0
Guest drivers ineligible for points
	(Italy) Antonio Fuoco			5	**4**											0
	(United Kingdom) Matt Parry											15	7			0
	(United Kingdom) Jack Aitken					23	31	9	13					25	19	0
	(Japan) Ukyo Sasahara			21	16									Ret	10	0
	(United Kingdom) Raoul Owens													16	18	0
	(United Kingdom) Gregor Ramsay			17	Ret					Ret	25	25	20	20	25	0
	(France) Joffrey De Narda			26	17							22	28			0
	(France) Nicolas Jamin											21	18			0
	(France) Simon Gachet									19	26					0
	(Estonia) Hans Villemi			22	26	24	23									0
	(France) John Filippi													22	27	0
	(France) Victor Sendin	24	24													0
	(United States) Ryan Tveter									24	27	Ret	Ret			0
	(Russia) Roman Beregech													Ret	24	0
	(Poland) Aleksander Bosak			27	31	Ret	30	29	25							0
	(Venezuela) Javier Amado			25	29											0
	(Italy) Mattia Vita											Ret	26			0
	(Portugal) Francisco Mora									Ret	29					0
	(New Zealand) Nick Cassidy	31	31													0
	(Russia) Denis Korneev					31	Ret									0
	(Austria) Bernd Herndlhofer											Ret	DNS			0
Pos	Driver	ARA (Spain)		SPA (Belgium)		MSC (Russia)		RBR (Austria)		HUN (Hungary)		LEC (France)		CAT (Spain)		Points

Colour	Result
Gold	Winner
Silver	Second place
Bronze	Third place
Green	Points classification
Blue	Non-points classification
Blue	Non-classified finish (NC)
Purple	Retired, not classified (Ret)
Red	Did not qualify (DNQ)
Red	Did not pre-qualify (DNPQ)
Black	Disqualified (DSQ)
White	Did not start (DNS)
White	Withdrew (WD)
White	Race cancelled (C)
Blank	Did not practice (DNP)
Blank	Did not arrive (DNA)
Blank	Excluded (EX)

**Bold** – Pole
Italics – Fastest Lap
Driver who retired but was classified denoted by †.

=== Teams' Championship ===
Pos	Driver	Car No.	ARA (Spain)		SPA (Belgium)		MSC (Russia)		RBR (Austria)		HUN (Hungary)		LEC (France)		CAT (Spain)		Points
1	(France) Tech 1 Racing	10	3	9	2	2	**1**	Ret	7	2	**1**	5	**1**	5	3	**6**	330
1	(France) Tech 1 Racing	11	7	2	29	Ret	22	7	Ret	26	4	8	7	9	4	5	330
1	(France) Tech 1 Racing	12	**1**	**1**	11	14	7	12	27	21	11	15	16	29			330
2	(France) ART Junior Team	14	17	26	Ret	15	12	13	18	20			21	18			198
2	(France) ART Junior Team	15	2	6	8	7	4	2	11	14	2	4	9	1	7	1	198
2	(France) ART Junior Team	16	15	15	4	28	13	15	20	17	10	10	19	Ret	5	3	198
3	(United Kingdom) Fortec Motorsports	7	5	5	6	5	11	5	4	4	5	9	4	2	23†	4	192
3	(United Kingdom) Fortec Motorsports	8	16	17	10	9	9	6	16	27	14	21	28	14	19	11	192
3	(United Kingdom) Fortec Motorsports	9	Ret	14			20	10	3	3	27	7	Ret	6	Ret	17	192
3	(United Kingdom) Fortec Motorsports	49							9	13	24	27	Ret	Ret			192
3	(United Kingdom) Fortec Motorsports	50											15	7			192
4	(Netherlands) Manor MP Motorsport	23	11	20			23	31			Ret	25	25	20	25	19	179
4	(Netherlands) Manor MP Motorsport	24	10	3	1	33	2	1	5	**1**	8	**3**	6	3	2	28	179
4	(Netherlands) Manor MP Motorsport	25	26	30	23	23	14	27	21	18			24	21	21	21	179
5	(Germany) Josef Kaufmann Racing	1	6	22	Ret	Ret	3	14	6	10	13	12	14	13	15	12	135
5	(Germany) Josef Kaufmann Racing	2	33	19	19	Ret	17	19	12	Ret	26	13	8	23	13	22	135
5	(Germany) Josef Kaufmann Racing	3	8	4	3	6	18	4	8	6	7	2	Ret	10	8	8	135
6	(Finland) Koiranen GP	4	9	7	Ret	8	10	16	15	12	3	1	3	12	**1**	2	120
6	(Finland) Koiranen GP	5	20	12	Ret	12	Ret	20	19	Ret	Ret	23	12	8	10	30	120
6	(Finland) Koiranen GP	6	19	13	12	13	26	17	14	Ret	16	22	11	23	14	14	120
7	(Italy) Prema Powerteam	32	14	25	31	1	5	9	32	7	6	11	2	**22**	Ret	23	112
7	(Italy) Prema Powerteam	33	12	11	15	3	6	8	31	Ret	9	14	18	16	24†	Ret	112
7	(Italy) Prema Powerteam	34			5	**4**			Ret	15	17	18	Ret	4	18	9	112
8	(Belgium) KTR	29	35	Ret	16	22	32	28	28	23	25	19	23	Ret	Ret	20	96
8	(Belgium) KTR	30	22	Ret	14	27	8	11	**10**	5	20	17	Ret	17	Ret	7	96
8	(Belgium) KTR	31	21	8	Ret	Ret	25	3	1	8	Ret	6	5	15	6	13	96
9	(France) ARTA Engineering	26	4	10	7	10	19	18	2	11	Ret	16	10	Ret	Ret	29	42
9	(France) ARTA Engineering	27	28	29	30	20	21	26	24	DNS			26	24	Ret	26	42
9	(France) ARTA Engineering	28	18	DNS	24	25	30	32	26	19	23	28	22	28			42
9	(France) ARTA Engineering	43			26	17					19	25					42
10	(Switzerland) Jenzer Motorsport	35	25	16	18	21	16	24	22	16	12	Ret	17	Ret	9	Ret	6
10	(Switzerland) Jenzer Motorsport	36	30	Ret	20	11	31	Ret	23	24	18	24	20	11	12	16	6
10	(Switzerland) Jenzer Motorsport	37	Ret	27	13	30	28	Ret	17	9	21	30	Ret	25	111	15	6
11	(Austria) Interwetten.com Racing	20	27	21	32	19	27	22									4
11	(Austria) Interwetten.com Racing	21	32	Ret	28	32			30	Ret	28	Ret	27	27	Ret	Ret	4
11	(Austria) Interwetten.com Racing	22	13	18	9	Ret			29	25	Ret	29	Ret	DNS			4
Guest teams ineligible for points
	(Italy) Euronova	44			17	Ret									20	25	0
	(Italy) Euronova	45			25	29											0
	(Italy) Euronova	46			21	16									Ret	10	0
	(Finland) SMP Racing	47			22	26	24	23									0
	(Finland) SMP Racing	48			27	31	Ret	30									0
	(Spain) AV Formula	40	24	24													0
	(Spain) AV Formula	41	31	31													0
Pos	Driver	Car No.	ARA (Spain)		SPA (Belgium)		MSC (Russia)		RBR (Austria)		HUN (Hungary)		LEC (France)		CAT (Spain)		Points

Colour	Result
Gold	Winner
Silver	Second place
Bronze	Third place
Green	Points classification
Blue	Non-points classification
Blue	Non-classified finish (NC)
Purple	Retired, not classified (Ret)
Red	Did not qualify (DNQ)
Red	Did not pre-qualify (DNPQ)
Black	Disqualified (DSQ)
White	Did not start (DNS)
White	Withdrew (WD)
White	Race cancelled (C)
Blank	Did not practice (DNP)
Blank	Did not arrive (DNA)
Blank	Excluded (EX)

**Bold** – Pole
Italics – Fastest Lap
