= Marcos Siebert =

Argentine racing driver

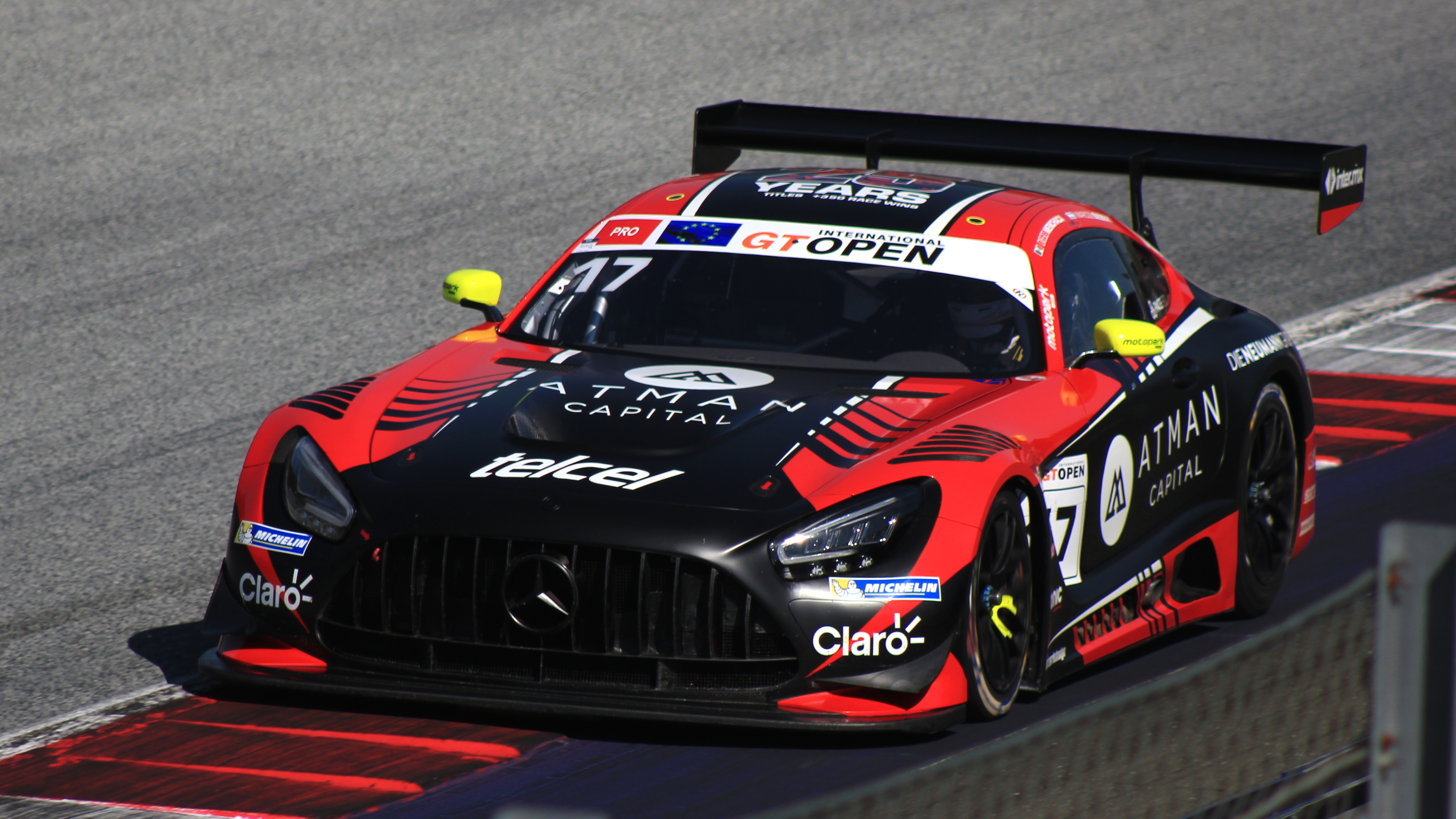
- Nationality: (Argentina) Argentine
- Born: 16 March 1996 (age 30) Mar del Plata, Argentina

GP3 Series career
- Debut season: 2017
- Current team: Campos Racing
- Categorisation: FIA Silver
- Car number: 28
- Starts: 15
- Wins: 0
- Poles: 0
- Fastest laps: 0
- Best finish: 16th in 2017

Previous series
- 2015-16 2015 2013 2013 2011-2012: Italian F4 Championship; GT4 European Series; Formula Renault 2.0 Alps; Eurocup Formula Renault 2.0; Formula Metropolitan

Championship titles
- 2023 2016: European Le Mans Series - LMP3; Italian F4 Championship

Marcos Siebert (born 16 March 1996 in Mar del Plata) is an Argentine racing driver. He currently competes at the 2025 GT World Challenge Europe Sprint Cup for AF Corse with a Ferrari 296 GT3. Siebert won the LMP3 drivers title at the 2023 European Le Mans Series.

== Career ==
=== Karting ===
Born in Mar del Plata, Siebert began karting in 2004 at the age of eight, his highlights of his karting career being a second and third at the 2005 and 2006 editions of the Promocional karting events.

=== Lower Formulae ===
Siebert graduated to single-seaters in 2011, spending two seasons in Formula Metropolitan, finishing 12th in the 2012 season. The following year, Siebert moved to the Formula Renault 2.0 series with Jenzer Motorsport, finishing 24th in both that year's editions of the Eurocup and Alps series.

=== Italian F4 Championship ===
After a year out of motorsport, Siebert reunited with Jenzer in 2015 to partake in the Italian F4 Championship. In his first season, he claimed two victories and finished fifth in the standings. He remained with Jenzer for the 2016 season and claimed the championship ahead of Mick Schumacher.

=== GP3 Series ===
In 2015, Siebert joined Jenzer for the post-season test at Yas Marina and to act as their reserve driver for 2016. In November 2016, Siebert once again took part in post-season testing with Jenzer and Trident Racing. In March 2017, Siebert joined Campos Racing for the pre-season test at Estoril.

== Racing record ==
=== Career summary ===
Season	Series	Team	Races	Wins	Poles	F/Laps	Podiums	Points	Position
2011	Formula Metropolitan	Re Competición	0	0	0	0	0	0	NC
2012	Formula Metropolitan	Scuderia Ramini	4	0	1	0	2	37	12th
2013	Eurocup Formula Renault 2.0	Jenzer Motorsport	14	0	0	0	0	2	24th
2013	Formula Renault 2.0 Alps	Jenzer Motorsport	2	0	0	0	0	10	23rd
2015	Italian F4 Championship	Jenzer Motorsport	20	2	0	2	4	112	5th
2015	GT4 European Series - Am	Sofia Car Motorsport	2	0	0	1	1	33	13th
2016	Italian F4 Championship	Jenzer Motorsport	21	4	4	1	9	231	**1st**
2017	GP3 Series	Campos Racing	15	0	0	0	0	14	16th
2018	Euroformula Open Championship	Campos Racing	16	1	1	2	7	195	**3rd**
2018	Spanish Formula 3 Championship	Campos Racing	6	1	0	0	4	0	NC†
2019	Formula Regional European Championship	US Racing	12	0	0	1	1	70	8th
2022	European Le Mans Series - LMP3	Eurointernational	1	0	0	0	0	0	24th
2023	European Le Mans Series - LMP3	Cool Racing	6	3	1	5	5	121	**1st**
2023	Asian Le Mans Series - LMP3	Cool Racing	4	0	0	0	1	26	8th
2023	International GT Open	Team Motopark	9	1	0	2	7	97	5th
2024	International GT Open	Team Motopark	14	0	1	1	5	81	8th
2024	European Le Mans Series - LMP2	IDEC Sport	2	0	0	0	1	25	12th
2025	GT World Challenge Europe Sprint Cup	AF Corse - Francorchamps Motors	10	0	0	0	0	0	NC
2025	GT World Challenge Europe Sprint Cup - Silver Cup	AF Corse - Francorchamps Motors	10	1	1	1	2	62.5	8th
2025	GT World Challenge Europe Endurance Cup	AF Corse - Francorchamps Motors	1	0	0	0	0	0	NC
2026	GT World Challenge Europe Endurance Cup	Team Motopark	1	0	0	0	0	0	NC

^{†} As Siebert was a guest driver, he was ineligible for points. ^{*} Season still in progress.

=== Complete Formula Renault 2.0 Alps Series results ===
(key) (Races in bold indicate pole position; races in italics indicate fastest lap)

Year	Team	1	2	3	4	5	6	7	8	9	10	11	12	13	14	Pos	Points
2013	Jenzer Motorsport	VLL; 1; 13	VLL; 2; 25	IMO1; 1	IMO1; 2	SPA; 1; 9	SPA; 2; 6	MNZ; 1	MNZ; 2	MIS; 1	MIS; 2	MUG; 1	MUG; 2	IMO2; 1	IMO2; 2	23rd	10

=== Complete Eurocup Formula Renault 2.0 results ===
(key) (Races in bold indicate pole position; races in italics indicate fastest lap)

Year	Team	1	2	3	4	5	6	7	8	9	10	11	12	13	14	Pos	Points
2013	Jenzer Motorsport	ALC; 1; 30	ALC; 2 Ret	SPA; 1; 20	SPA; 2; 11	MSC; 1	MSC; 2	RBR; 1; 23	RBR; 2; 24	HUN; 1; 18	HUN; 2; 24	LEC; 1; 20	LEC; 2; 11	CAT; 1; 12	CAT; 2; 16	24th	2

=== Complete Italian F4 Championship results ===
(key) (Races in bold indicate pole position) (Races in italics indicate fastest lap)

Year	Entrant	1	2	3	4	5	6	7	8	9	10	11	12	13	14	15	16	17	18	19	20	21	22	23	DC	Points
2015	Jenzer Motorsport	VLL; 1 Ret	VLL; 2 Ret	VLL; 3 EX	MNZ; 1; 10	MNZ; 2; 7	MNZ; 3; 9	IMO1; 1; 6	IMO1; 2; 2	IMO1; 3; 4	MUG; 1; 8	MUG; 2; 1	MUG; 3; 3	ADR; 1; 13	ADR; 2; 7	ADR; 3; 6	IMO2; 1; 18	IMO2; 2; 19	IMO2; 3; 7	MIS; 1; 14	MIS; 2; 8	MIS; 3; 1			5th	112
2016	Jenzer Motorsport	**MIS**; **1**; 5	MIS; 2	**MIS**; **3**; 2	MIS; 4; 1	ADR; 1; 5	ADR; 2	ADR; 3; 1	ADR; 4; 3	**IMO1**; **1**; 1	IMO1; 2; 2	IMO1; 3; 6	MUG; 1 Ret	MUG; 2; 8	MUG; 3; 1	VLL; 1; 6	VLL; 2; 5	VLL; 3; 6	IMO2; 1; 25	**IMO2**; **2**; 3	IMO2; 3; 20	MNZ; 1; 2	MNZ; 2; 5	MNZ; 3 Ret	1st	231

=== Complete GP3 Series results ===
(key) (Races in bold indicate pole position) (Races in italics indicate fastest lap)

Year	Entrant	1	2	3	4	5	6	7	8	9	10	11	12	13	14	15	16	Pos	Points
2017	Campos Racing	CAT; FEA; 10	CAT; SPR; 16	RBR; FEA; 12	RBR; SPR; 10	SIL; FEA; 12	SIL; SPR; 10	HUN; FEA; 11	HUN; SPR; 9	SPA; FEA; Ret	SPA; SPR; Ret	MNZ; FEA; 4	MNZ; SPR; C	JER; FEA; 18	JER; SPR; 17	YMC; FEA; Ret	YMC; SPR; Ret	16th	14

=== Complete Euroformula Open Championship results ===
(key) (Races in bold indicate pole position; races in italics indicate points for the fastest lap of top ten finishers)

Year	Entrant	1	2	3	4	5	6	7	8	9	10	11	12	13	14	15	16	DC	Points
2018	Campos Racing	EST; 1; 4	EST; 2; 1	LEC; 1; 8	LEC; 2; 6	SPA; 1; 11	SPA; 2; 4	HUN; 1; 3	HUN; 2; 3	SIL; 1; 5	SIL; 2; 4	MNZ; 1; 2	MNZ; 2 Ret	JER; 1; 4	JER; 2; 3	**CAT**; **1**; 2	CAT; 2; 3	3rd	195

=== Complete Formula Regional European Championship results ===
(key) (Races in bold indicate pole position; races in italics indicate points for the fastest lap of top ten finishers)

Year	Entrant	1	2	3	4	5	6	7	8	9	10	11	12	13	14	15	16	17	18	19	20	21	22	23	24	25	DC	Points
2019	US Racing	LEC; 1	LEC; 2	LEC; 3	VLL; 1; 3	VLL; 2; 13†	VLL; 3 C	HUN; 1; 4	HUN; 2; 6	HUN; 3; 10	RBR; 1; 11	RBR; 2; 4	RBR; 3; 10	IMO; 1 Ret	IMO; 2; 10	IMO; 3; 5	IMO; 4; 5	CAT; 1	CAT; 2	CAT; 3	MUG; 1	MUG; 2	MUG; 3	MNZ; 1	MNZ; 2	MNZ; 3	8th	70

=== Complete European Le Mans Series results ===
(key) (Races in bold indicate pole position; results in italics indicate fastest lap)

Year	Entrant	Class	Chassis	Engine	1	2	3	4	5	6	Rank	Points
2022	Eurointernational	LMP3	Ligier JS P320	Nissan VK56DE 5.6 L V8	LEC; Ret	IMO; WD	MNZ	CAT	SPA	ALG	27th	0
2023	Cool Racing	LMP3	Ligier JS P320	Nissan VK56DE 5.6 L V8	**CAT**; 1	LEC; 3	ARA; 1	SPA; 1	ALG; 4	ALG; 2	1st	121
2024	IDEC Sport	LMP2	Oreca 07	Gibson GK428 4.2 L V8	CAT	LEC	IMO; 5	SPA; 3	MUG	ALG	12th	25

=== Complete Asian Le Mans Series results ===
(key) (Races in bold indicate pole position) (Races in italics indicate fastest lap)

Year	Team	Class	Car	Engine	1	2	3	4	Pos.	Points
2023	Cool Racing	LMP3	Ligier JS P320	Nissan VK56DE 5.6L V8	DUB; 1; 14	DUB; 2 Ret	ABU; 1; 6	ABU; 2; 2	8th	26

=== Complete International GT Open results ===
Year	Team	Car	Class	1	2	3	4	5	6	7	8	9	10	11	12	13	14	Pos.	Points
2023	Team Motopark	Mercedes-AMG GT3 Evo	Pro	ALG; 1; 3	ALG; 2; 1	SPA; 1; 3	HUN; 1; 5	HUN; 2; 2	LEC; 1; 2	LEC; 2; 3	RBR; 1; 2	RBR; 2; 11	MNZ; 1	MNZ; 2	CAT; 1	CAT; 2		5th	97
2024	Team Motopark	Mercedes-AMG GT3 Evo	Pro	ALG; 1 Ret	ALG; 2; 3	HOC; 1; 2	HOC; 2; 2	**SPA**; **1**; 6	HUN; 1; 3	HUN; 2; 11	LEC; 1; 3	LEC; 2 Ret	RBR; 1; 7	RBR; 2 Ret	CAT; 1; 7	CAT; 2; 6	MNZ; 1; 9	8th	81

=== Complete GT World Challenge Europe results ===
==== GT World Challenge Europe Sprint Cup ====
(key) (Races in bold indicate pole position) (Races in italics indicate fastest lap)

Year	Team	Car	Class	1	2	3	4	5	6	7	8	9	10	Pos.	Points
2025	AF Corse - Francorchamps Motors	Ferrari 296 GT3	Silver	BRH; 1; 11	BRH; 2; 22	ZAN; 1; 33	ZAN; 2; 16	MIS; 1; 21	MIS; 2; 17	**MAG**; **1**; 11	MAG; 2; 29	VAL; 1; 22	VAL; 2; 20	8th	62.5

==== GT World Challenge Europe Endurance Cup ====
(key) (Races in bold indicate pole position) (Races in italics indicate fastest lap)

Year	Team	Car	Class	1	2	3	4	5	6	7	Pos.	Points
2025	AF Corse - Francorchamps Motors	Ferrari 296 GT3	Bronze	LEC	MNZ	SPA; 6H; 53	SPA; 12H; 37	SPA; 24H; 33	NÜR	CAT	38th	4
2026	Team Motopark	Mercedes-AMG GT3 Evo	Silver	LEC	MNZ	SPA; 6H	SPA; 12H	SPA; 24H	NÜR	ALG; 22	NC‡	0‡

Sporting positions
Preceded by Ralf Aron	Italian F4 Championship; Champion; 2016	Succeeded by Marcus Armstrong
Preceded by Malthe Jakobsen; Maurice Smith; Mike Benham	European Le Mans Series; LMP3 Champion; 2023; With: Alex García & Adrien Chila	Succeeded by Incumbent
