= Kevin Jörg =

Swiss racing driver

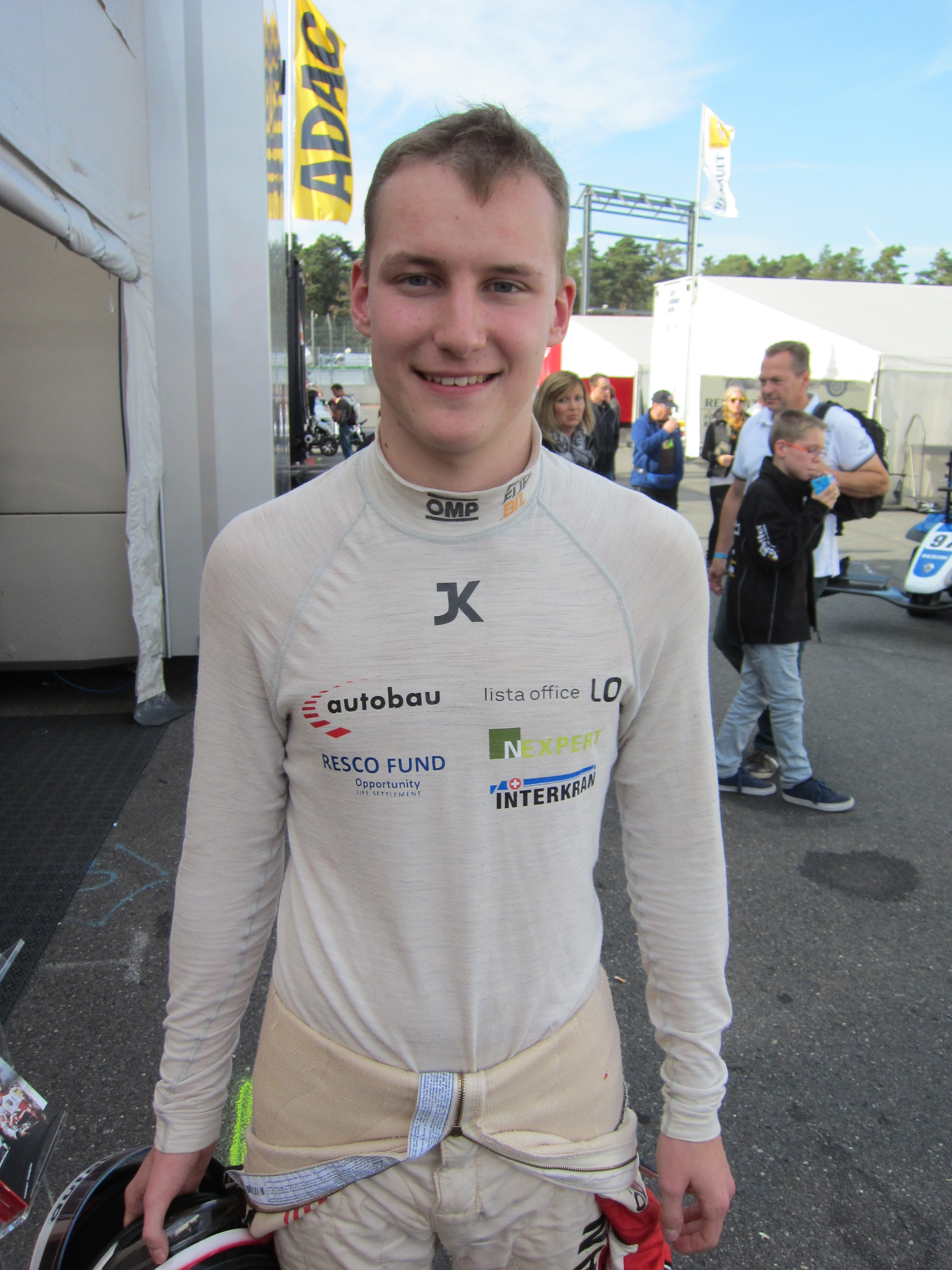
- Jörg in 2015
- Nationality: (Switzerland) Swiss
- Born: 11 September 1995 (age 31) Weesen, Switzerland

GP3 Series career
- Debut season: 2016
- Current team: Trident
- Categorisation: FIA Silver
- Car number: 9
- Former teams: DAMS
- Starts: 33
- Wins: 0
- Poles: 0
- Fastest laps: 0
- Best finish: 12th in 2017

Previous series
- 2012-15 2012, 2014-15 2013 2011-12 2011: Eurocup Formula Renault 2.0; Formula Renault 2.0 NEC; Formula Renault 2.0 Alps; Formula Abarth; Formula BMW Talent Cup

Kevin Jörg (born 11 September 1995 in Weesen) is a Swiss former racing driver and a former member of the Renault Sport Academy.

== Career ==
=== Karting ===
Jörg first began karting in 2007, partaking in numerous championships across Switzerland.

=== Lower Formulae ===
In 2011, Jörg graduated to single-seaters, competing in four races of Formula Abarth with Jenzer Motorsport, where he finished nineteenth in the European Championship and twenty second in the Italian. That same year, Jörg competed in the Formula BMW Talent Cup where he finished fourth. He remained with Jenzer in Formula Abarth full-time the following year, finishing sixth in both championships.

=== Formula Renault ===
In 2012, Jörg partook in one round of both the Eurocup Formula Renault 2.0 championship and Northern European Cup with EPIC Racing and Daltec respectively. The following year, Jörg moved to Eurocup full-time with Jenzer, where he finished fourteenth overall. He also competed in the Alps Series, where he claimed three podiums and finished fourth.

In 2014, Jörg switched to Josef Kaufmann Racing, where he claimed his maiden Eurocup victory and finished sixth. He claimed two additional victories in NEC, as well as three pole positions and fastest laps, and finished fourteenth overall. He remained with Josef Kaufmann the following year where he finished third in Eurocup and as NEC vice-champion.

=== GP3 Series ===
In 2016, it was announced that Jörg would race with the DAMS squad in their maiden season. He finished fourteenth overall.

In January 2017, Jörg switched to Trident; he retired from racing at the end of 2017 due to financial issues.

=== Formula One ===
In February 2016, Jörg was among four drivers incorporated into the newly formed Renault Sport Academy. The following year, he was dropped from the program.

== Racing record ==
=== Career summary ===
Season	Series	Team	Races	Wins	Poles	F/Laps	Podiums	Points	Position
2011	Formula Abarth European Series	Jenzer Motorsport	4	0	0	0	0	7	19th
2011	Formula Abarth Italian Series	Jenzer Motorsport	2	0	0	0	0	2	22nd
2011	Formula Lista Junior	Jo Zeller Racing	2	0	0	0	0	5	12th
2011	Formula BMW Talent Cup		1	0	0	0	0	0	4th
2012	Formula Abarth European Series	Jenzer Motorsport	24	0	1	0	6	176	6th
2012	Formula Abarth Italian Series	Jenzer Motorsport	18	0	0	0	3	122	6th
2012	Eurocup Formula Renault 2.0	EPIC Racing	2	0	0	0	0	0	NC
2012	Formula Renault 2.0 NEC	Daltec Racing	2	0	0	0	0	3	47th
2013	Eurocup Formula Renault 2.0	Jenzer Motorsport	14	0	0	0	0	2	23rd
2013	Formula Renault 2.0 Alps	Jenzer Motorsport	14	0	0	0	3	90	4th
2014	Eurocup Formula Renault 2.0	Josef Kaufmann Racing	14	1	0	0	2	87	6th
2014	Formula Renault 2.0 NEC	Josef Kaufmann Racing	7	2	2	3	3	118	13th
2015	Eurocup Formula Renault 2.0	Josef Kaufmann Racing	17	1	1	2	6	193	**3rd**
2015	Formula Renault 2.0 NEC	Josef Kaufmann Racing	16	2	2	3	11	305	**2nd**
2016	GP3 Series	DAMS	18	0	0	0	0	26	14th
2017	GP3 Series	Trident	15	0	0	0	1	28	12th

=== Complete Formula Renault 2.0 Alps Series results ===
(key) (Races in bold indicate pole position; races in italics indicate fastest lap)

Year	Team	1	2	3	4	5	6	7	8	9	10	11	12	13	14	Pos	Points
2013	Jenzer Motorsport	VLL; 1; 11	VLL; 2; 10	IMO1; 1; 14	IMO1; 2; 15	SPA; 1; 3	SPA; 2; 4	MNZ; 1; 7	MNZ; 2 Ret	MIS; 1; 3	MIS; 2; 3	MUG; 1; 8	MUG; 2; 4	IMO2; 1; 14	IMO2; 2; 5	4th	90

=== Complete Eurocup Formula Renault 2.0 results ===
(key) (Races in bold indicate pole position; races in italics indicate fastest lap)

Year	Entrant	1	2	3	4	5	6	7	8	9	10	11	12	13	14	15	16	17	DC	Points
2012	EPIC Racing	ALC; 1	ALC; 2	SPA; 1	SPA; 2	NÜR; 1	NÜR; 2	MSC; 1	MSC; 2	HUN; 1	HUN; 2	LEC; 1	LEC; 2	CAT; 1 Ret	CAT; 2 DNS				NC†	0
2013	Jenzer Motorsport	ALC; 1; 25	ALC; 2; 16	SPA; 1; 18	SPA; 2; 21	MSC; 1; 16	MSC; 2; 24	RBR; 1; 22	RBR; 2; 16	HUN; 1; 12	HUN; 2 Ret	LEC; 1; 17	LEC; 2 Ret	CAT; 1; 9	CAT; 2 Ret				23rd	2
2014	Josef Kaufmann Racing	ALC; 1; 15	ALC; 2; 2	SPA; 1; 7	SPA; 2; 14	MSC; 1; 7	MSC; 2; 1	NÜR; 1; 10	NÜR; 2 Ret	HUN; 1; 13	HUN; 2; 11	LEC; 1; 7	LEC; 2; 6	JER; 1 Ret	JER; 2; 4				6th	87
2015	Josef Kaufmann Racing	ALC; 1; 5	ALC; 2; 2	ALC; 3; 7	SPA; 1; 13	SPA; 2; 8	HUN; 1; 4	HUN; 2; 2	SIL; 1; 4	SIL; 2; 1	SIL; 3; 2	NÜR; 1; 8	NÜR; 2; 5	**LMS**; **1**; 2	LMS; 2; 7	JER; 1; 2	JER; 2; 4	JER; 3; 24	3rd	193

† As Jörg was a guest driver, he was ineligible for points

=== Complete Formula Renault 2.0 NEC results ===
(key) (Races in bold indicate pole position) (Races in italics indicate fastest lap)

Year	Entrant	1	2	3	4	5	6	7	8	9	10	11	12	13	14	15	16	17	18	19	20	DC	Points
2012	Daltec Racing	HOC; 1	HOC; 2	HOC; 3	NÜR; 1	NÜR; 2	OSC; 1	OSC; 2	OSC; 3	ASS; 1	ASS; 2	RBR; 1	RBR; 2	MST; 1	MST; 2	MST; 3	ZAN; 1	ZAN; 2	ZAN; 3	SPA; 1; 18	SPA; 2; 29	47th	3
2014	Josef Kaufmann Racing	MNZ; 1; 7	**MNZ**; **2**; 1	SIL; 1	SIL; 2	HOC; 1	HOC; 2	HOC; 3	**SPA**; **1**; 1	**SPA**; **2**; 20	ASS; 1	ASS; 2	MST; 1; 5	MST; 2; 14	MST; 3 C	NÜR; 1; 3	NÜR; 2 DNS	NÜR; 3 C				13th	118
2015	Josef Kaufmann Racing	MNZ; 1; 23	MNZ; 2; 9	SIL; 1; 8	SIL; 2; 3	RBR; 1; 1	**RBR**; **2**; 1	RBR; 3; 2	SPA; 1; 2	SPA; 2; 3	**ASS**; **1**; 3	ASS; 2; 4	NÜR; 1; 3	NÜR; 2; 3	HOC; 1; 4	HOC; 2; 2	HOC; 3; 2					2nd	305

=== Complete GP3 Series results ===
(key) (Races in bold indicate pole position) (Races in italics indicate fastest lap)

Year	Entrant	1	2	3	4	5	6	7	8	9	10	11	12	13	14	15	16	17	18	Pos	Points
2016	DAMS	CAT; FEA; 5	CAT; SPR; 7	RBR; FEA; 13	RBR; SPR; 14	SIL; FEA; 15	SIL; SPR; 11	HUN; FEA; 10	HUN; SPR; 9	HOC; FEA; 14	HOC; SPR; 10	SPA; FEA; 11	SPA; SPR; Ret	MNZ; FEA; NC	MNZ; SPR; 12	SEP; FEA; 12	SEP; SPR; 11	YMC; FEA; 4	YMC; SPR; 8	14th	26
2017	Trident	CAT; FEA; 13	CAT; SPR; 9	RBR; FEA; 11	RBR; SPR; 9	SIL; FEA; 9	SIL; SPR; 7	HUN; FEA; 7	HUN; SPR; 3	SPA; FEA; 10	SPA; SPR; 8	MNZ; FEA; 9	MNZ; SPR; C	JER; FEA; 20	JER; SPR; 18	YMC; FEA; 9	YMC; SPR; 7			12th	28

^{†} Driver did not finish the race, but was classified as he completed over 90% of the race distance.
