= Formula 1: Drive to Survive season 2 =

2020 documentary television series

Formula 1: Drive to Survive
- Season 2
- No. of episodes: 10

Release
- Original network: Netflix
- Original release: 28 February 2020

Season chronology
- ← Previous; Season 1 Next → Season 3

The second season of Formula 1: Drive to Survive documents the 2019 Formula One World Championship. It ran for 10 episodes and aired on Netflix on 28 February 2020, all of which were available on the same date.

== Premise and release ==
The 10-part series covers the 2019 Formula One World Championship and included every team, including Ferrari and Mercedes who had not allowed Netflix to cover their teams in the first season. The second season covered Daniel Ricciardo and Nico Hulkenberg's misfortunes at Renault, Pierre Gasly's chaotic year which culminated in his demotion to Toro Rosso, the Belgian Grand Prix weekend, which had just seen the death of Formula 2 driver Anthoine Hubert during the feature race, and Haas F1 Team's new sponsors in Rich Energy and their lack of success on track.

The trailer for the second season was released on 17 February 2020, and the season premiered on Netflix on 28 February 2020, with all 10 episodes released on the same date.

== Episodes ==
No. overall	No. in season	Title	Original release date
11	1	"Lights Out"	28 February 2020
The 2019 Formula One World Championship is due to begin at the Australian Grand Prix in Melbourne, and the drivers head on over on a cruise to attend the season-opening. Daniel Ricciardo is introduced to his new team, Renault, while Red Bull team boss Christian Horner hopes that using Honda engines will work out for Red Bull. For 2019, the Haas F1 Team target fourth in the championship. Almost immediately after the race starts, Daniel Ricciardo loses his front wing and subsequently retires from his home race. Grosjean retires after one of his wheels is loose. Meanwhile, Max Verstappen manages to pass Sebastian Vettel for 3rd (which is Honda's first podium since returning to F1), and Kevin Magnussen finishes a satisfactory sixth.
12	2	"Boiling Point"	28 February 2020
The Haas F1 Team has got a sponsor from Rich Energy. However, their 2019 Formula 1 season has started very poorly, as they are currently ninth in the championship. At the Austrian Grand Prix, the team hopes to reverse their fortunes. It starts well, with Kevin Magnussen qualifying fifth, albeit with a five-place grid penalty. However, during the race, the drivers are easily overtaken by the midfield cars and they even finish behind the backmarker team Williams. Before the British Grand Prix, Rich Energy end their sponsorship with Haas for poor performance. The team make Romain Grosjean drive the car they used for the Australian Grand Prix, which was competitive. Grosjean and Magnussen crash into each other in the race, forcing them to retire from the race. Guenther Steiner admonishes them for letting the team down, threatening to fire them, while team owner Gene Haas questions the team's long term commitment to Formula One.
13	3	"Dogfight"	28 February 2020
The fortunes of Daniel Ricciardo, who replaced Carlos Sainz at Renault, is compared with the latter, who now drives for McLaren. The episode explores Ricciardo's choice between joining McLaren or Renault after 2018. Meanwhile, Sainz hopes that his move to McLaren will work out for him, as McLaren has performed poorly in the last few years. In the Azerbaijan and Spanish Grand Prix, Sainz moves on an upward trajectory after an unlucky first few races while Ricciardo struggles to get to grips with the Renault car. Ricciardo hopes to reverse the situation he has experienced so far in the season.
14	4	"Dark Days"	28 February 2020
Mercedes have dominated Formula One for the past five years and are looking to secure a sixth consecutive Formula One World Championship. Team Principal Toto Wolff explains how the former three-time Formula 1 World Champion Niki Lauda was instrumental in their rise. Unfortunately, Niki Lauda passes away before the Monaco Grand Prix. Lewis Hamilton, a five-time Formula 1 World Champion, dedicates his victory in Monaco to him. At the German Grand Prix, Mercedes celebrate their 125th anniversary in motorsport and their 200th Grand Prix start. However, Hamilton catches a flu that has spread around the paddock. In qualifying, he secures pole position, while his teammate Valtteri Bottas qualifies 3rd. In the race, Hamilton dominates the early stages, however, things begin to go horribly wrong when he crashes into the penultimate corner. The team orders him to come into the pits to replace his broken front wing, but he is penalized for going on the wrong side of the bollard. The team takes nearly a minute to do the job, which significantly drops him down the order. Bottas retires from the race after crashing while chasing another car for third. After numerous errors, Hamilton finishes 11th. Toto Wolff reassures Hamilton that they will learn from the disastrous weekend and come back stronger, remembering Niki Lauda.
15	5	"Great Expectations"	28 February 2020
Red Bull are so far producing good results with their far more reliable Honda engine. However, newly promoted Pierre Gasly is struggling with the car, while being completely outperformed by Max Verstappen. However, team principal Christian Horner is patient, hoping that Gasly will find his feet and settle down with his new team. In the Monaco Grand Prix, Verstappen qualifies ahead of Gasly again. Verstappen fights Hamilton for the win but fails in the end. Gasly finishes fifth, nowhere near the pace of the other frontrunners. At the Canadian Grand Prix, Red Bull is running out of patience with Gasly as he qualifies poorly and slides back into the midfield in the race. In Austria, Max Verstappen wins the race, overtaking Charles Leclerc in the last few laps, while Gasly finishes a lap down on his teammate. Christian Horner questions "who is the right guy to partner Verstappen".
16	6	"Raging Bulls"	28 February 2020
Red Bull Racing have decided to release Gasly from his contract at Red Bull and demote him back to Toro Rosso. He is replaced by the rookie Thai driver Alexander Albon, who formerly drove for Toro Rosso. Red Bull will evaluate their performances in 2019, and then choose the driver lineup for 2020. At the Belgian Grand Prix, Albon qualifies well but is forced to start towards the back of the grid owing to an engine penalty. During a support Formula 2 race, driver Anthoine Hubert gets involved in a high-speed collision with several other drivers and is killed. Hubert is revealed to have been one of Gasly's best friends. The next morning, all of the drivers and teams mourn the loss of Hubert. During the race, Verstappen collides with Kimi Räikkönen, causing both of them to retire. Albon manages to fight his way into fifth place while Gasly finishes in a decent ninth. The episode is dedicated to Anthoine Hubert.
17	7	"Seeing Red"	28 February 2020
Ferrari have struggled to challenge Mercedes for the constructor's championship for years. This is not helped by the intra-team rivalry between Sebastian Vettel and Charles Leclerc. Vettel undergoes pressure to perform better since he is far more experienced than Leclerc and that Ferrari made him the No. 1 driver. In the Italian Grand Prix, Leclerc wins, with this being Ferrari's first victory in their home ground for over 10 years, while Vettel finishes a dismal 13th after having a spin. Their rivalry is further explored in Singapore and Russia. At the United States Grand Prix, Leclerc's engine breaks in a free practice session, forcing him to use an old engine for the race. Vettel manages to qualify 2nd, ahead of Leclerc in 4th. However, Vettel rapidly slips down the order in the race and eventually retires after a suspension failure, while Leclerc finishes in 4th. Vettel acknowledges that he underestimated Leclerc, and Ferrari team principal Mattia Binotto resolves to treat them as equals for next season.
18	8	"Musical Chairs"	28 February 2020
Renault driver Nico Hulkenberg continues his frustration of having no wins or even podiums in his Formula 1 career. The addition of Daniel Ricciardo to Renault brings him pressure, as Ricciardo is a proven race-winner. In Canada, Nico Hulkenberg tries to overtake Ricciardo for sixth, but Renault orders him to not overtake him. In the French Grand Prix (Renault's home race), Ricciardo and Hulkenberg finish 7th and 8th respectively, but a five-second time penalty for leaving the track and gaining an advantage demotes Ricciardo to 11th. At the German Grand Prix, Ricciardo retires after his car has engine reliability issues. Nico Hulkenberg has a great chance of getting a podium in his home race, however, at the penultimate corner, his car crashes into the barriers. Team principal Cyril Abiteboul reveals that in his contract for the team (which expires this year), there was a performance clause that he has failed to meet so far. Abiteboul discusses with Toto Wolff to get Esteban Ocon, who is a reserve driver for Mercedes, to replace Hulkenberg at Renault. He announces that for 2020, the driver lineup will be Ricciardo and Ocon.
19	9	"Blood, Sweat & Tears"	28 February 2020
The Williams team suffered their worst season ever in 2018. They want to not repeat the woes of last year for 2019. As part of their reconstruction, Williams have made significant changes in their departments, and deputy team principal Claire Williams hired renowned engineer Paddy Lowe as their chief technical director. For their driver lineup, they have hired the 2018 F2 champion and Mercedes junior driver George Russell, and Robert Kubica, who used to be in Formula One but his career was interrupted by a car crash. However, there are many problems with the car they are making, missing even basic things like wheel nuts. As a result, they are very behind schedule, and they miss the first two days of pre-season testing in trying to build the car. Paddy Lowe leaves the team after refusing to take responsibility for the woes of Williams. A few months later, at the British Grand Prix, Williams are at the bottom of the constructor's championship for the second season in a row. George Russell notes how the car feels awful to drive and that he is not really racing anyone else because the Williams car is very off the pace. Claire Williams expresses her desire to protect her father's legacy and improve fortunes at Williams.
20	10	"Checkered Flag"	28 February 2020
Prior the Brazilian Grand Prix, Alex Albon is confirmed to be driving for Red Bull for 2020. Since moving back to Toro Rosso, Gasly is performing well. Meanwhile, Carlos Sainz is having his best season so far, consistently scoring points. Carlos Sainz starts at the back of the grid in Brazil after having engine reliability issues in qualifying. Sainz fights his way through the grid. The safety car is brought out when Bottas retires, and the tension between Vettel and Leclerc finally erupts when they crash into each other and retire from the race. As a result, Albon and Gasly are elevated into 2nd and 3rd respectively, while Sainz has recovered to 5th. Lewis Hamilton, in 4th, first overtakes Gasly and tries to do the same with Albon, but he crashes into him, robbing Albon of his first F1 podium. Lewis Hamilton then fights Gasly for 2nd but fails as Gasly takes his first Formula 1 podium. Sainz finishes 4th. Lewis Hamilton is penalized post-race, elevating Sainz to 3rd. As a result, Sainz takes a maiden podium. Instead of having the podium ceremony with Gasly and Verstappen, Carlos Sainz celebrates with McLaren, who have ended a podium drought that lasted five seasons. Lewis Hamilton is crowned a six-time World Champion. He celebrates this with the Mercedes team, who are for the sixth season in a row, the Constructor's championship. Nico Hulkenberg bids farewell to Renault and Haas resolve to get back to where they were in 2020. In 2020, a lot of the driver's contracts will expire, and in 2021, a budget cap will be implemented to reduce the advantage of the top teams.
