= Formula 1: Drive to Survive season 3 =

2021 documentary television series

Formula 1: Drive to Survive
- Season 3
- No. of episodes: 10

Release
- Original network: Netflix
- Original release: 19 March 2021

Season chronology
- ← Previous; Season 2 Next → Season 4

The third season of Formula 1: Drive to Survive documents the 2020 Formula One World Championship. It ran for 10 episodes and aired on Netflix on 19 March 2021, all of which were available on the same date.

== Premise and release ==
The third season of the show, covering the 2020 Formula One World Championship, premiered on 19 March 2021 and continued some drivers' stories from the previous season, such as Daniel Ricciardo's dissatisfaction at Renault and Pierre Gasly's attempts to regain his lost seat at Red Bull. It also covered the effects of the COVID-19 pandemic on the season, Scuderia Ferrari's struggle to remain competitive following the power unit controversy of the previous year, and Romain Grosjean's serious crash at the Bahrain Grand Prix.

Filming began for the 2020 season in March but was suspended until July due to the COVID-19 pandemic. The trailer for the third season was released on 19 February 2021, and the season premiered on Netflix on 19 March 2021 with all 10 episodes released on the same date.

== Episodes ==
No. overall	No. in season	Title	Original release date
21	1	"Cash Is King"	19 March 2021
The 2020 Formula 1 season opens with pre-season testing at the Circuit de Barcelona-Catalunya. The teams and drivers all prepare their cars for the upcoming races. Controversy arises when it appears Racing Point's car is very similar to the previous year's championship-winning Mercedes. Racing Point is shown to have a lot of pace in testing, causing concern amongst their rivals. However, there is also an ongoing COVID-19 pandemic spreading through the world, raising questions throughout the paddock of whether the Formula 1 drivers should continue racing. As the teams prepare for the season-opening Australian Grand Prix, the threat of the pandemic extends to Formula 1 as several team members test positive for COVID-19. Ultimately, this results in the Australian Grand Prix being cancelled. Many of the races in the Formula 1 calendar are either cancelled or postponed as the pandemic spreads. A lot of the teams are put at financial risk as a result.
22	2	"Back On Track"	19 March 2021
After several months without any races, Formula 1 has worked out a new, modified calendar. The season instead will start in Austria. The rivalry between Red Bull and Mercedes heats up, as it is discovered that Mercedes has invented the dual axis steering, an innovative system which would give Mercedes an advantage over the rest of the field. Mercedes are allowed to keep this system for the remainder of 2020, frustrating Red Bull. Alex Albon, coming on the back of a strong 2019 season, aims to improve even further and help Red Bull in their fight for the Constructor's championship. At McLaren, Lando Norris wants to have a stronger second season and be closer to his teammate Carlos Sainz Jr. Mercedes dominate qualifying, occupying the front row of the starting grid, but Red Bull urge the FIA to penalise Lewis Hamilton for ignoring yellow flags during qualifying. As a result, Lewis Hamilton will instead start in fifth. Albon seems to be on his way to getting a podium, but towards the end of the race, he collides with Hamilton, who is subsequently penalised for this incident. Lando Norris, running in fourth, becomes aware of this penalty, hunts Hamilton down and sets the fastest lap of the race. This is enough to elevate Norris to his first podium in his Formula 1 career. Lando Norris celebrates his podium, while Albon reflects on his missed opportunity.
23	3	"Nobody's Fool"	19 March 2021
Formula 1 heads over to the Russian Grand Prix as Mercedes driver Valtteri Bottas is repeatedly frustrated at finishing behind his teammate Lewis Hamilton. Bottas has a long history of being asked by Mercedes to let Hamilton through to benefit him in his title fights. Meanwhile, Lewis Hamilton has a chance of matching Michael Schumacher's record of 91 career wins. In qualifying, Lewis Hamilton gets pole position, but Valtteri Bottas deliberately gives Max Verstappen's car an advantageous tow so that he will start 3rd (this would give him an advantage when the race starts). This upsets both Hamilton and Mercedes. Pre-race, Hamilton practises his starts as anticipation to this but ends up doing so outside the designated area. Hamilton manages to keep the lead from Bottas when the race starts. However, during the race, Hamilton is penalised with a 10-second penalty for his illegal practice starts. This hands Bottas an easy win, while Hamilton is only able to recover to third place. The Mercedes team express frustration at Hamilton's penalty but are still happy with the overall result.
24	4	"We Need to Talk About Ferrari"	19 March 2021
Ferrari have endured a disastrous 2020 season, with the car struggling to keep pace with its rivals. Their driver Sebastian Vettel is planning to leave Ferrari at the end of the season, while Charles Leclerc has signed to stay at Ferrari for five more years. At the Italian Grand Prix, Ferrari hopes to redeem its season with a good result at their home race. Qualifying turns out to be a disaster as Charles Leclerc only manages to be 13th fastest, while Vettel gets stuck in traffic and only manages 17th. Both drivers find the car very tricky to drive. In the race, Vettel's car's brakes stop functioning and he soon retires from the race. Charles Leclerc miraculously finds himself in a good position, but the car twitches and he crashes himself out of the race. Soon after a disastrous race, Ferrari celebrates their 1000th Grand Prix start in Tuscany. However, Vettel is revealed to have signed with Racing Point (now Aston Martin) for the 2021 season, overshadowing Ferrari's celebration.
25	5	"The End of the Affair"	19 March 2021
Before the 2020 season gets underway, Daniel Ricciardo announces he's leaving Renault at the end of the year to move to McLaren, a decision made after only one year at the team, straining the relationship between Ricciardo and team principal Cyril Abiteboul, who takes the move personally. Meanwhile, a group of constructors led by Renault launch an official protest against Racing Point's car, accusing it of using a brake duct design copied from the previous years' Mercedes. Racing Point argues that the ducts are legal as the designs were purchased prior to the regulation change forbidding teams to share designs. The FIA ultimately fines Racing Point €400,000 and deducts 15 points from the constructors' championship, to the disappointment of both Racing Point and their competitors, who argue that the punishment is too lenient.
26	6	"The Comeback Kid"	19 March 2021
After being demoted to Scuderia Toro Rosso (now Scuderia AlphaTauri) in the second half of the 2019 season from Red Bull Racing, Pierre Gasly hopes to improve himself after a successful second half of the 2019 season in 2020. When Formula 1 travels to the Circuit de Spa-Francorchamps for the Belgian Grand Prix, Gasly remembers the death of his close friend Anthoine Hubert in a Formula 2 Feature Race the year before. Gasly wears a tribute helmet in memory of his close friend, and he finishes 8th. A week later, at the Italian Grand Prix, Gasly is having a good race, and as a result of a pit stop that came before a Safety Car period, he finds himself in contention for a race win. After Charles Leclerc crashes out in the last corner of the track, a red flag comes out to temporarily halt the race. After completing the first lap of the restarted race, Lewis Hamilton is forced to come into the pits to serve a 10 second stop-and-go penalty for pitting when the pit lane was closed. Gasly now has to hold off the charging McLaren MCL35 of Carlos Sainz Jr. On the final lap, Sainz looks like he is ready to overtake Gasly, but Gasly holds on to take his first Formula 1 victory, making him the first French driver to win a Formula 1 race since Olivier Panis at the 1996 Monaco Grand Prix, and the first win for Scuderia AlphaTauri since their win at the same track in 2008, back when they were still known as Toro Rosso.
27	7	"Guenther's Choice"	19 March 2021
With 2019 seeing Haas's worst results in Formula 1 and the loss of their title sponsor Rich Energy, and their 2020 season faring no better, Haas is desperate for a change in fortunes and an injection of new sponsors. Team principal Guenther Steiner is tasked with securing sponsorship with an unnamed German company, whilst simultaneously being pressured to replace one of his drivers with the German Formula 2 champion Mick Schumacher, the son of seven-time Formula 1 world champion Michael Schumacher. However, Alfa Romeo is also courting Schumacher, and Steiner is forced to pull the trigger—firing both Haas drivers to hire Schumacher and Nikita Mazepin, son of Russian billionaire Dmitry Mazepin.
28	8	"No Regrets"	19 March 2021
With Carlos Sainz already confirmed to be joining Ferrari for the 2021 season, McLaren shifts their efforts to supporting his soon-to-be-former teammate, Lando Norris, creating tensions between the drivers as Norris begins to receive preferential treatment. Sainz, meanwhile, is left ruminating on his decision to move after Ferrari's disastrous performance during the 2020 season. At the Italian Grand Prix, Sainz finishes 2nd after coming very close to a maiden victory, while Ferrari has a disastrous weekend.
29	9	"Man On Fire"	19 March 2021
During the opening lap of the Bahrain Grand Prix, Romain Grosjean's Haas VF-20 leaves the track and crashes into a metal barrier travelling at 192 km/h (119 mph), splitting the car in two and engulfing the forward half in fire. The race is quickly stopped as stewards and medical teams hurry to Grosjean's aid, while drivers and paddock alike express their shock at the severity of the accident. After a long 28 seconds, Grosjean emerges from the flames, having managed to exit the wreckage unaided but with second-degree burns. Meanwhile, Red Bull's Alex Albon is fighting to prove himself to his team after a season of disappointing results. Although the team publicly supports him, rumours fly that they're courting Sergio Pérez as a potential replacement after Pérez's ejection from Racing Point. Although Albon finishes a respectable third in Bahrain (with Pérez forced to retire due to a mechanical problem), Pérez pulls off an impressive feat at the following Sakhir Grand Prix—successfully recovering from the last place, following a first-lap collision with Charles Leclerc, to win the race. The episode ends with team principal Christian Horner calling Pérez, congratulating him on joining Red Bull.
30	10	"Down to the Wire"	19 March 2021
It's the last race of the season, the Abu Dhabi Grand Prix, and although Mercedes and Red Bull have already secured first and second place in Constructors' World Championships, a battle still wages between McLaren, Racing Point and Renault for third place. Racing Point sits in third prior to the race, with McLaren 10 points and Renault 22 points behind, respectively. In qualifying, McLaren's drivers qualify 4th and 6th and Renault in 11th and 12th. Racing Point's Lance Stroll qualifies 8th, but his teammate Sergio Pérez has to start on the back row of the grid after his car requires replacement power unit parts outside of the allowed quota. This does little to help in the race when a power unit failure forces Pérez to retire on lap 9, seriously jeopardising the team's placement. By the chequered flag McLaren successfully wins 18 championship points, Renault an additional nine, and Racing Point only one; with McLaren securing third place in the constructors' championship. At the end of the season, the teams say goodbye to their departing drivers, Racing Point announce their rebranding to Aston Martin, and Lewis Hamilton discusses his experiences with racism in his Formula One career and his desire to speak up following the murder of George Floyd and the killing of Breonna Taylor.
