= Formula 1: Drive to Survive season 4 =

2022 documentary television series

Formula 1: Drive to Survive
- Season 4
- No. of episodes: 10

Release
- Original network: Netflix
- Original release: 11 March 2022

Season chronology
- ← Previous; Season 3 Next → Season 5

The fourth season of Formula 1: Drive to Survive documents the 2021 Formula One World Championship. It ran for 10 episodes and aired on Netflix on 11 March 2022, all of which were available on the same date.

== Premise and release ==
Season 4 which documents the 2021 Formula One World Championship premiered on Netflix on 11 March 2022. This season covers the fierce title battle of that season between seven-time champion Lewis Hamilton and Dutch driver Max Verstappen.

The trailer for the fourth season was released on 28 February 2022, and the season premiered on Netflix on 11 March 2022 with all 10 episodes released on the same date. Between 6 March 2022 and 20 March 2022, the series was watched for 57.03 million hours according to Netflix's top 10 list.

== Episodes ==
No. overall	No. in season	Title	Original release date
31	1	"Clash of the Titans"	11 March 2022
The 2021 Formula One season begins with pre-season testing in Bahrain. Several drivers have swapped teams, with three new drivers, Mick Schumacher, Nikita Mazepin, and Yuki Tsunoda on the grid for the first time. The team principals reflect on the years that Mercedes has been dominant in the sport. On track during the pre-season testing, both Mercedes drivers Lewis Hamilton and Valtteri Bottas complain about the undrivable nature of their cars. Both Carlos Sainz Jr. and Daniel Ricciardo set out to get used to their cars in their new teams, whilst Pierre Gasly reflects on his new position as the experienced driver at Scuderia AlphaTauri opposite his new rookie teammate. Red Bull Racing driver Max Verstappen takes pole position for the first race, whilst Haas F1 Team driver Nikita Mazepin fails to finish after crashing on the first corner. Following an off-track overtake for which Max Verstappen is told to give back the position, Lewis Hamilton wins the first Grand Prix of the year.
32	2	"Ace in the Hole"	11 March 2022
The McLaren F1 Team achieved third in the constructors championship in 2020. However, due to having financial hardships, McLaren F1 Team driver Carlos Sainz Jr., moved away from the team to Scuderia Ferrari. Sainz's move left an empty spot in the McLaren team which was later filled by the Australian driver, Daniel Ricciardo. During qualifying in the 2021 Bahrain Grand Prix, Daniel Ricciardo set a lap time enough to beat his teammate Lando Norris by a single position. With some nice overtakes on other drivers including his teammate Daniel Ricciardo saw Lando Norris finish fourth. Three places ahead of Daniel Ricciardo whom finished seventh. Things got even worse in the following 2021 Emilia Romagna Grand Prix and the 2021 Portuguese Grand Prix. Daniel Ricciardo had to make way for Lando Norris during the race in which ultimately saw Lando Norris finish on the podium. For qualifying in Portugal, Daniel Ricciardo managed to get knocked-out in only the first qualifying session. Following the contract renewal of Lando Norris before the 2021 Monaco Grand Prix, he was able to lap his teammate in the race.
33	3	"Tipping Point"	11 March 2022
Max Verstappen is leading Red Bull Racing to challenge Lewis Hamilton and Mercedes in the championship. A series of victories saw the Dutch driver built a commanding lead in the driver's standings. However, a first-lap crash between the two title rivals at the 2021 British Grand Prix led to controversy. While Verstappen retired from the lead and walked away uninjured, Hamilton overtook Ferrari's Charles Leclerc at the final few lap to take the home win and slash Verstappen's championship lead to single-digit.
34	4	"A Mountain to Climb"	11 March 2022
The Haas F1 Team takes in two rookies named Nikita Mazepin and Mick Schumacher, the latter the son of seven-time Champion Michael Schumacher, and a new sponsor in Uralkali. After a poor showing for the Haas outfit in 2020, could Mazepin and Schumacher reap the benefits and lead the charge up the field?
35	5	"Staying Alive"	11 March 2022
Exploiting the opportunity of a lifetime, Daniel Ricciardo takes the McLaren MCL35M to new heights at the Italian Grand Prix, which serves as the home race for Scuderia Ferrari.
36	6	"A Point to Prove"	11 March 2022
After a turbulent few years, Williams, under new leadership, hopes to rise once more.
37	7	"Growing Pains"	11 March 2022
Yuki Tsunoda and Esteban Ocon, both driving midfield cars, must prove their worth against the competitive nature of Formula One.
38	8	"Dances With Wolff"	11 March 2022
A driver is highly rumoured to join Mercedes, which leaves incumbent driver Valtteri Bottas' future with the team in question.
39	9	"Gloves are Off"	11 March 2022
With the season soon wrapping up, the drivers start to utilise interesting tactics to get ahead of their rivals.
40	10	"Hard Racing"	11 March 2022
After a whole season of drama and fighting, Max Verstappen and Lewis Hamilton have a fight of their lives in the 2021 Abu Dhabi Grand Prix. Which includes a last lap overtake winning the WDC, after a crash and dodgy race control.
