= Formula 1: Drive to Survive season 1 =

2019 documentary television series

Formula 1: Drive to Survive
- Season 1
- No. of episodes: 10

Release
- Original network: Netflix
- Original release: 8 March 2019

Season chronology
- Next → Season 2

The first season of Formula 1: Drive to Survive documents the 2018 Formula One World Championship. It ran for 10 episodes and aired on Netflix on 8 March 2019, all of which were available on the same date.

== Premise and release ==
The 10-part series is the "first to truly immerse the audience inside the cockpits, the paddock and the lives of the key players in Formula 1". The series covers the 2018 Formula One World Championship and has "unparalleled and exclusive access to the world's fastest drivers, team principals and owners, as well as Formula 1's own management team".

The trailer for the first season was released on 20 February 2019, and on 8 March 2019 the series premiered on Netflix with all 10 episodes released on the same date.

== Episodes ==
No. overall	No. in season	Title	Original release date
1	1	"All to Play For"	8 March 2019
Red Bull Racing driver Daniel Ricciardo prepares himself for the opening race of what he believes to be the most important season of his career. A penalty in qualifying makes his race more difficult, and he goes on to finish fourth. Meanwhile, Haas enjoy their strongest qualifying to date, but their race ends in heartbreak when mistakes in the pits mean both their drivers retire.
2	2	"The King of Spain"	8 March 2019
Carlos Sainz Jr. reflects on the opening races of the season, his ongoing battles with his idol Fernando Alonso and life as the son of a World Champion. He secures a career-best result in Azerbaijan, and prevails over Alonso in the Spanish Grand Prix. Red Bull Racing team principal Christian Horner must deal with the fallout from a collision between Ricciardo and team-mate Max Verstappen in Azerbaijan that takes both drivers out of contention.
3	3	"Redemption"	8 March 2019
Ricciardo enters the Monaco Grand Prix weekend questioning his future with Red Bull. An accident in free practice means that Verstappen is unable to qualify and starts the race from last place. Ricciardo qualifies on pole and leads the early stages of the race, but an engine failure leaves him down on power. He ultimately withstands pressure from Ferrari's Sebastian Vettel to win. Meanwhile, Williams struggle with a poor run of results as they fall further down the grid.
4	4	"The Art of War"	8 March 2019
Horner becomes embroiled in a war of words with Renault team principal Cyril Abiteboul over their engine supply. Horner is unhappy with Renault's performance and reliability, while Abiteboul pushes back against Horner's public criticism. Horner ultimately decides to end the relationship with Renault and join Honda in 2019. Feeling that Red Bull are favouring Verstappen and that Honda are still unproven, Ricciardo decides to leave the team and join Renault in 2019. Although Horner publicly supports him, Ricciardo begins to feel isolated within the team. Meanwhile, Ricciardo's contract with Renault means that Sainz Jr. is without a drive in 2019.
5	5	"Trouble at the Top"	8 March 2019
In the build-up to the British Grand Prix, McLaren and Force India face very different problems. McLaren team principal Eric Boullier resigns over the team's poor performance, leaving CEO Zak Brown to try and rebuild the team whilst they struggle with an uncompetitive car. Force India team principal Vijay Mallya tries to deal with legal problems stemming from the collapse of his airline in 2013. The race sees Force India's Esteban Ocon beat both McLarens, while Sergio Pérez is caught up in a first-corner accident. The result sees Force India take sixth place from McLaren in the World Constructors' Championship, but three weeks later the team is put into administration.
6	6	"All or Nothing"	8 March 2019
Force India are saved by a consortium led by billionaire Lawrence Stroll. However, the deal comes with the expectation that Stroll's son Lance will drive for the team in 2019. This leaves Ocon and Pérez fighting to secure the sole remaining seat, which is further complicated by their poor relationship as the two had a history of colliding in 2017. Things come to a head when they collide on the opening lap of the Singapore Grand Prix, forcing Ocon out of the race. Pérez's frustrations see him collide with Sergey Sirotkin later in the race, which sees him retire as well. In Mexico, Force India announce that Pérez will partner Lance Stroll, leaving Ocon without a seat. Ocon uses the last races of the season to show his potential to other teams, but ultimately fails to secure a drive.
7	7	"Keeping Your Head"	8 March 2019
Haas driver Romain Grosjean endures a difficult start to the season, which has included errors in Azerbaijan and Spain. As Grosjean admits to self-doubt, team owner Gene Haas and team principal Guenther Steiner try to find a way to channel Grosjean's speed into consistency. They hope the upcoming French Grand Prix—Grosjean's home race—will offer him the opportunity to enjoy himself and secure a points finish. While the car proves fast to begin with, another driver error means Grosjean qualifies poorly. He goes on to finish the Grand Prix in eleventh after being run off the circuit twice and easily passed by other drivers. Steiner continued to support Grosjean, but admits that he has to seriously consider replacing Grosjean in 2019.
8	8	"The Next Generation"	8 March 2019
The episode follows rookie drivers Pierre Gasly and Charles Leclerc as they prepare for the Singapore Grand Prix, regarded as the toughest race on the calendar. Red Bull Racing name Gasly as Daniel Ricciardo's replacement, while the announcement that Kimi Räikkönen will leave Ferrari leads to speculation that Ferrari are considering signing Leclerc for the 2019 season. Gasly and Leclerc battle one another throughout the race, with Leclerc finishing ahead of Gasly. Meanwhile, Leclerc's team-mate Marcus Ericsson tries to rebuild his confidence after an accident during practice for the Italian Grand Prix. Ericsson misses out on points in Singapore, and his team later announce that they will not renew his contract. Ferrari sign Leclerc, who wants to use the opportunity to honour the memory of his godfather, Jules Bianchi.
9	9	"Stars and Stripes"	8 March 2019
In the time since the French Grand Prix, Haas have regrouped and as the championship draws to a close, they have the chance to take fourth in the World Constructors' Championship. This fuels their rivalry with Renault ahead of the United States Grand Prix. An opening-lap accident sees Grosjean retire, whilst Renault's Carlos Sainz Jr. is penalised for running off the circuit and gaining an advantage. The race for fourth comes down to Renault's Nico Hülkenberg and Haas' Kevin Magnussen, who happen to be bitter rivals. Hülkenberg develops a tyre problem late in the race, but holds onto sixth place. The result means Renault secure fourth place in the Constructors' Championship, leaving Haas to reflect on the missed opportunity.
10	10	"Crossing the Line"	8 March 2019
Red Bull Racing prepare for the final race of the season. Ricciardo says goodbye to the team, while Verstappen faces scrutiny for an incident with Esteban Ocon after the Brazilian Grand Prix. Verstappen makes a poor start in the race, but the team give him the preferred strategy and he goes on to finish ahead of Ricciardo in third. Meanwhile, Fernando Alonso announces his retirement from Formula 1 and McLaren start their preparations for 2019 by signing Carlos Sainz Jr. and Formula 2 driver Lando Norris. Guenther Steiner, Christian Horner and Cyril Abiteboul discuss their plans for 2019 and how they intend to fight with the top teams.
