= George Russell (racing driver) =

British racing driver (born 1998)

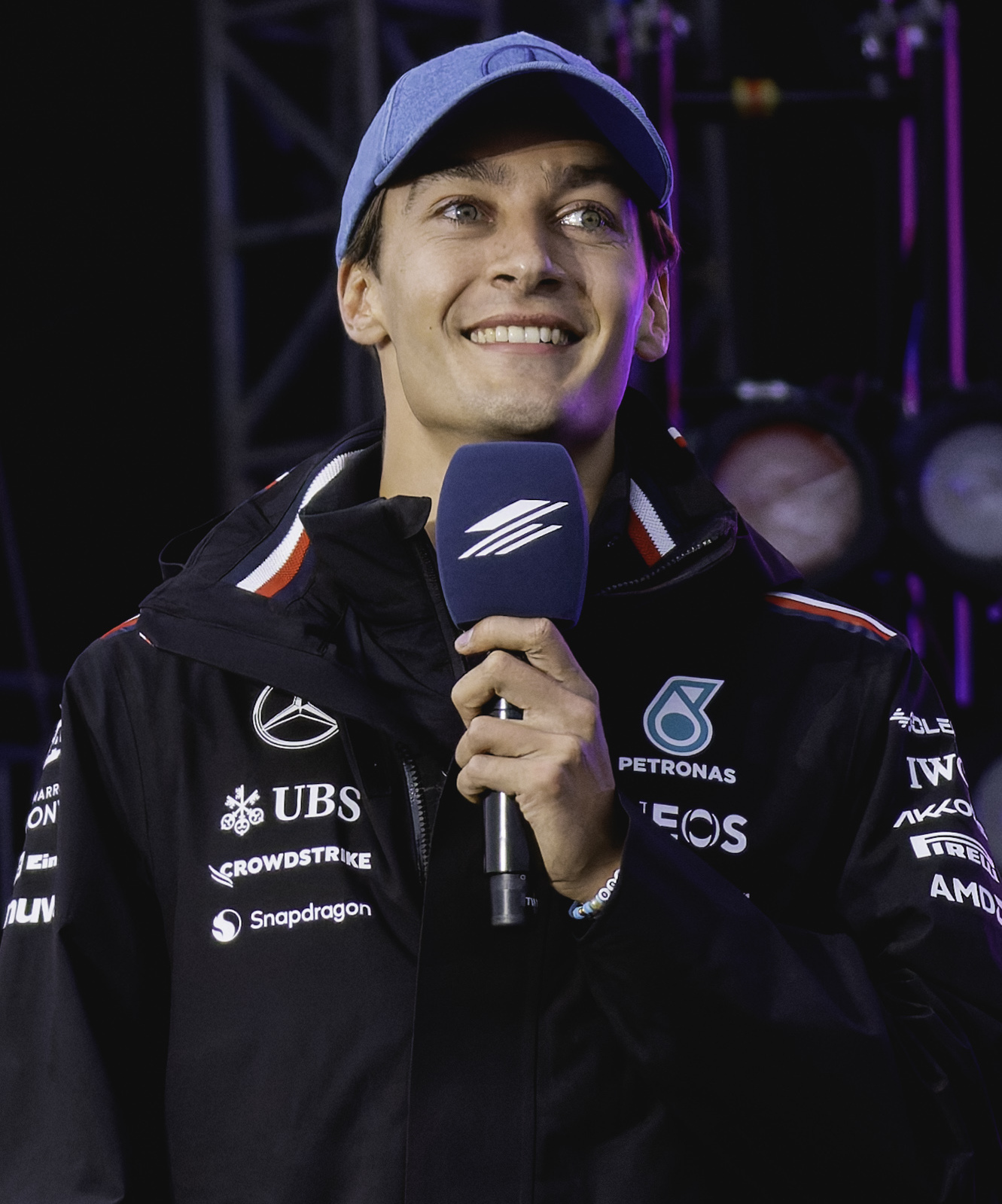
- Russell at the 2024 British Grand Prix
- Born: George William Russell; 15 February 1998 (age 28); King's Lynn, Norfolk, England
- Partner(s): Carmen Montero Mundt (2020–present; engaged)

Formula One World Championship career
- Nationality: (United Kingdom) British
- 2026 team: Mercedes
- Car number: 63
- Entries: 173 (173 starts)
- Championships: 0
- Wins: 8
- Podiums: 32
- Career points: 1297
- Pole positions: 12
- Fastest laps: 13
- First entry: 2019 Australian Grand Prix
- First win: 2022 São Paulo Grand Prix
- Last win: 2026 Azerbaijan Grand Prix
- Last entry: 2026 Las Vegas Grand Prix
- 2025 position: 4th (319 pts)

Previous series
- 2018; 2017; 2015–2016; 2014; 2014; 2014: FIA Formula 2; GP3 Series; FIA F3 European; Formula Renault Eurocup; BRDC F4; Formula Renault 2.0 Alps

Championship titles
- 2018; 2017; 2014: FIA Formula 2; GP3 Series; BRDC F4

Awards
- 2024; 2022; 2014: Lorenzo Bandini Trophy; Hawthorn Memorial Trophy; Autosport BRDC Award
- Website: www.georgerussell63.com

Signature
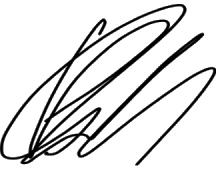

George William Russell (/rʌsəl/; born 15 February 1998) is a British racing driver who competes in Formula One for Mercedes. Russell has won eight Formula One Grands Prix across eight seasons.

Born and raised in King's Lynn, Russell began competitive kart racing aged seven. After a successful karting career—culminating in back-to-back victories at the junior European Championship in 2011 and 2012—Russell graduated to junior formulae. He won his first title at the 2014 BRDC F4 Championship. He then won the 2017 GP3 Series and the 2018 FIA Formula 2 Championship back-to-back with ART, becoming the fifth driver to win the GP2/Formula 2 championship in their rookie season and the second driver to win both titles in their respective rookie seasons.

A member of the Mercedes Junior Team since 2017, Russell signed for Williams in 2019 to partner Robert Kubica, making his Formula One debut at the Australian Grand Prix. He substituted for Lewis Hamilton at the 2020 Sakhir Grand Prix for Mercedes, but was denied victory due to a team error and a puncture after leading the majority of the race. Russell scored his maiden podium at the curtailed 2021 Belgian Grand Prix with Williams. In 2022, Russell replaced Valtteri Bottas at Mercedes to partner Hamilton; in his first season, Russell achieved his maiden pole position in Hungary and his maiden win in São Paulo, finishing fourth in the World Drivers' Championship. After a winless season for Mercedes in 2023, Russell won the Austrian and Las Vegas Grands Prix in 2024, followed by the Canadian and Singapore Grands Prix in 2025; in 2024, he also became the first driver in 30 years to be disqualified from a race win. Amidst a new regulation cycle introduced for 2026, Mercedes emerged as the fastest team, with Russell winning the Australian and Austrian Grands Prix, and achieving his first career Grand Slam at the Azerbaijan Grand Prix. While he was beaten to the Drivers' Championship by teammate Kimi Antonelli, his contributions, along with Antonelli's, helped Mercedes secure its first Constructors' Championship since 2021.

As of the 2026 Las Vegas Grand Prix, Russell has achieved 8 race wins, 12 pole positions, 13 fastest laps, and 32 podiums in Formula One. Russell is contracted to remain at Mercedes until at least the end of the 2026 season.

== Early life ==
Russell was born in King's Lynn, Norfolk, to father Steve and mother Alison. His father managed a business selling seeds and pulses, which he sold in 2012 to fund his son's junior racing career. Russell is the youngest of three siblings, including sister Cara and brother Benjy. He grew up in Tydd St Giles/Wisbech and Castle Rising.

Russell took up karting at the age of seven, following his brother Benjy, a competitive karter who won the 2007 Super 1 National Kart Championship in the Rotax Max category. Russell picked up his number 63 from the kart his brother rented at the time. Growing up, his father would intentionally overstate his lap times to motivate him to drive faster.

Russell attended Wisbech Grammar School, but shifted to homeschooling so that he could devote more time to his racing career. At 18, he moved to Milton Keynes to be closer to his junior racing team.

== Junior racing career ==
=== Karting (2006–2013) ===
Russell began karting in 2006 and progressed to the cadet class by 2009, becoming MSA British champion and British Open champion. In 2010 he moved to the Rotax Mini Max category where he became Super One British champion, Formula Kart Stars British champion, and also won the Kartmasters British Grand Prix.

Russell graduated to the KF3 class in 2011. He joined the Intrepid karting team with help from Intrepid's Alex Albon; his teammates that year included Albon and Charles Leclerc. Russell became CIK-FIA European Champion and won the SKUSA SuperNationals title, while Leclerc won the Karting World Cup. In 2012, Russell became the first driver in history to successfully defend the Junior European Championship, and nearly defended his SKUSA title following Lance Stroll's disqualification, although Stroll's win was ultimately reinstated. In his final year of karting in 2013, Russell moved up to KF1, finishing 19th in the CIK-FIA World Championship.

=== Formula 4 (2014) ===
In 2014, Russell made his single-seater debut, simultaneously competing in BRDC Formula 4 (Lanan Racing) and Formula Renault 2.0 Alps (Koiranen GP). He led most of the BRDC F4 season, but lost the points lead to teammate Arjun Maini before the final race at Snetterton, which Formula Scout attributed to a mid-season case of chickenpox. He won that race to claim the title. As a reward, he was granted a GP3 test at Yas Marina.

=== Formula Renault 2.0 (2014) ===
Russell had a more difficult season in Formula Renault 2.0 Alps. Although he was initially supposed to race for Prema, Lance Stroll's father (Prema's part-owner and main funder) vetoed Russell from the team, even though Stroll was racing in Italian F4 and not Formula Renault. Russell found a landing spot with Koiranen, which dominated the season, scoring 423 points to Prema's 61. However, Russell was outshone by his Koiranen teammate Nyck de Vries (three years his elder), who won nine out of twelve races. Looking back, Russell said that Tech 1 Racing (his other option to replace Prema) would have been a better fit, but strongly praised de Vries, remarking that he "was always one of the very best," and that especially "in go-karting, he was the man to beat."

Russell's season ended on a high note after talent scout Gwen Lagrue (who later recruited him to Mercedes) arranged for him to join Tech 1 for the final round of the Eurocup Formula Renault 2.0 season at Jerez. Eurocup was a higher level of competition than Alps. Nonetheless, Russell won the final race of the Eurocup season, holding off a hard-charging de Vries and finishing 23.057 seconds ahead of his Tech 1 teammate Anthoine Hubert.

At the end of the season, Russell won the Autosport BRDC Award after successfully testing Formula Two, DTM, and GT3 cars. At seventeen, he was the youngest-ever winner of the award; the BRDC lowered the entry age to accommodate him. He was also selected for the BRDC's SuperStars junior driver mentorship programme, where he was once again the youngest-ever selection.

=== Formula Three (2015–2016) ===
==== 2015: Debut in FIA European F3 and Masters podium ====
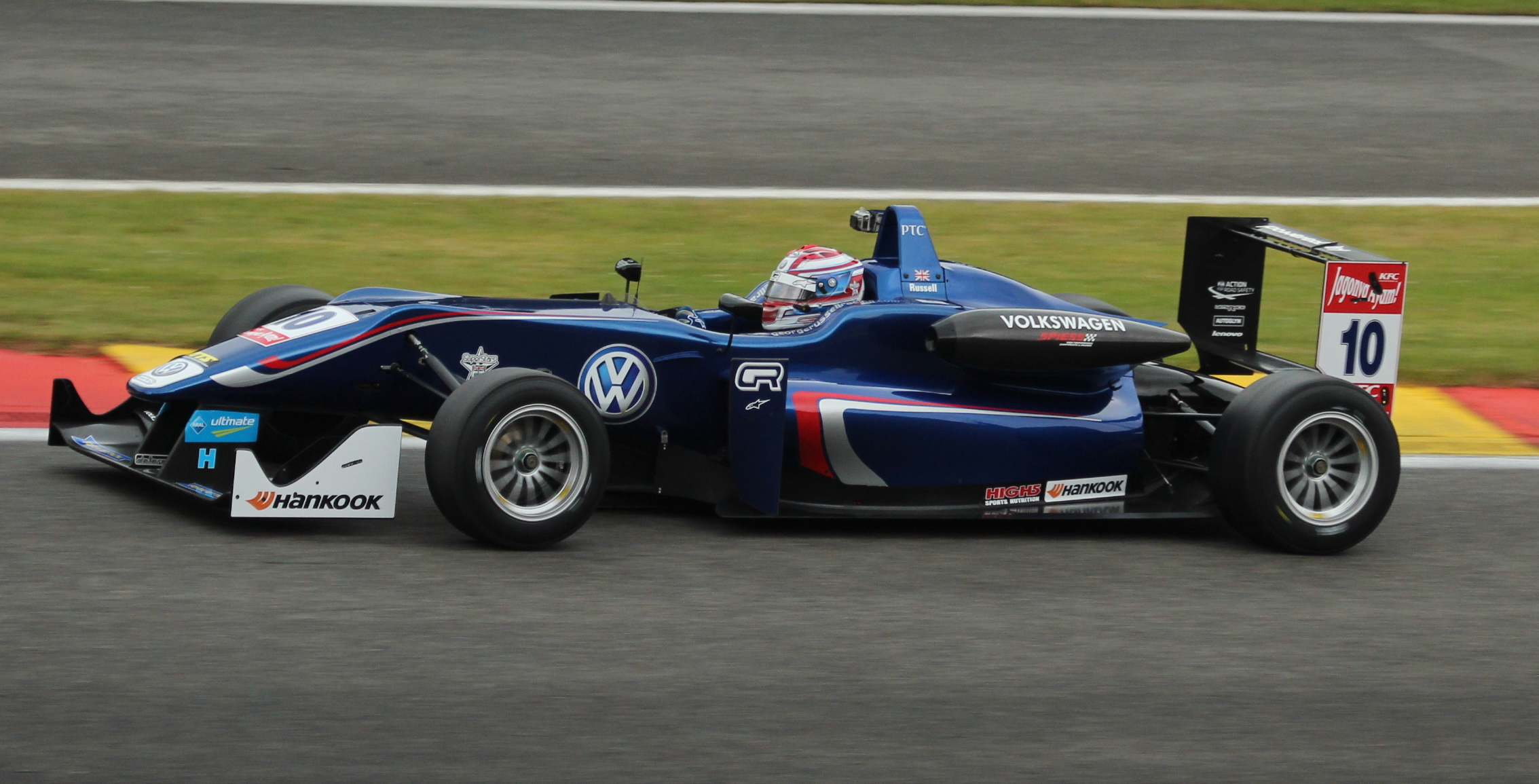
Russell competing at Spa during the 2015 FIA Formula 3 European Championship

Although Russell was expected to spend 2015 competing full-time in Eurocup Formula Renault 2.0, his BRDC Award win prompted him to skip directly to European Formula Three, where he spent the next two years.

In 2015, Russell drove for Carlin, a Volkswagen affiliate. He finished sixth, winning one race and collecting three podiums; PaddockScout opined that his qualifying pace was "his one obvious weak-spot," and that he primarily stood out for his race pace and ability to cleanly overtake other drivers. He was second in the Rookies' Championship, behind Charles Leclerc, although fellow rookie Lance Stroll finished above him in the overall classification (the Rookies' Championship re-scores each race to remove non-rookies). He also finished second at the 2015 Masters of Formula 3 exhibition race, behind Antonio Giovinazzi.

==== 2016: Third in Europe with Hitech ====
In 2016, Russell switched to Hitech GP, a new Mercedes affiliate which was competing in its first full European Formula Three season. That year, Prema allegedly received special engines from Mercedes and technical support (including a suspension upgrade) from Williams. Stroll (whose family was funding Prema) cruised to the title, with Russell finishing third, behind Prema drivers Stroll and Maximilian Günther. Nonetheless, Mercedes was impressed by Russell's performances and signed him to its driver academy at the end of the season. After making it to Formula One, Russell questioned the fairness of the 2016 competition, stating that it was "almost laughable to see ... how wrong that championship was."

=== Mercedes Junior Team ===
I had other F1 teams speak to me before Mercedes ... and it felt like they didn't even care. Because in this time, junior programs were not a thing. I think McLaren had one driver, Mercedes had one driver, Ferrari had ... maybe Jules Bianchi, but he was already in Formula One. And Red Bull had, of course, maybe five or six. ... So, I just thought, you know, "I need to do something that ... will be memorable."

— Russell recalling his Mercedes PowerPoint presentation

As Russell advanced through the junior pyramid, the costs of racing grew significantly. He estimated that it cost "£50K a year if you want to compete, £200K if you want to win." Steve Russell spent roughly £1.5m to fund his son's junior career. When Russell was sixteen, his father explained that he could not keep on funding him and that Russell needed to find a junior driver programme. (Not long after that, Russell faced an £800K bill for a single Formula Two season.)

Russell applied for a spot on the Mercedes Junior Team. Unlike modern Formula One driver academies, Mercedes signed only one driver at a time, although it funded additional drivers on a short-term basis. To sway Mercedes leadership, Russell prepared a Microsoft PowerPoint presentation explaining why the team should sign him.

To audition Russell for a full-time academy spot, Mercedes boss Toto Wolff offered to fund Russell's 2015 European Formula Three season. However, Mercedes's top F3 affiliate was Prema, from which Russell had already been vetoed. Russell chose Volkswagen, which did not have a Formula One team at the time. At season's end, BMW offered him a DTM drive, but Mercedes persuaded him to bet on himself, offering him funding for a second F3 season and making him the senior team's simulator driver. Russell switched to a Mercedes-powered F3 team for 2016.

In early 2017, Russell officially joined the Mercedes Junior Team. Wolff "set hard targets" for Russell, asking him to win the GP3 and Formula 2 titles before progressing to Formula One.

=== GP3 Series (2017) ===
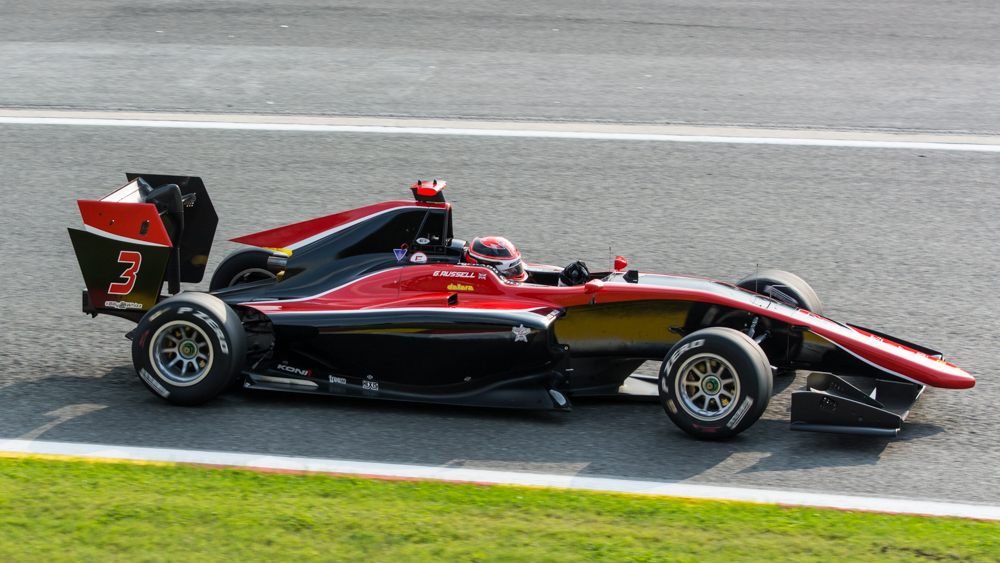
Russell racing at the 2017 Spa-Francorchamps GP3 round

With financial help from Mercedes, Russell secured a drive with ART Grand Prix for the 2017 season. ART was GP3's dominant team, having won six of the last seven team titles. In 2017, it swept the top four places in the standings.

Russell won the title as a rookie, scoring four wins and finishing 79 points ahead of the second-placed Jack Aitken. He locked up the title with two races to go. Notable races included a dominant performance at Spa-Francorchamps (a win, a second place, two poles, and two fastest laps) and a close three-way battle at Monza.

=== FIA Formula 2 (2018) ===
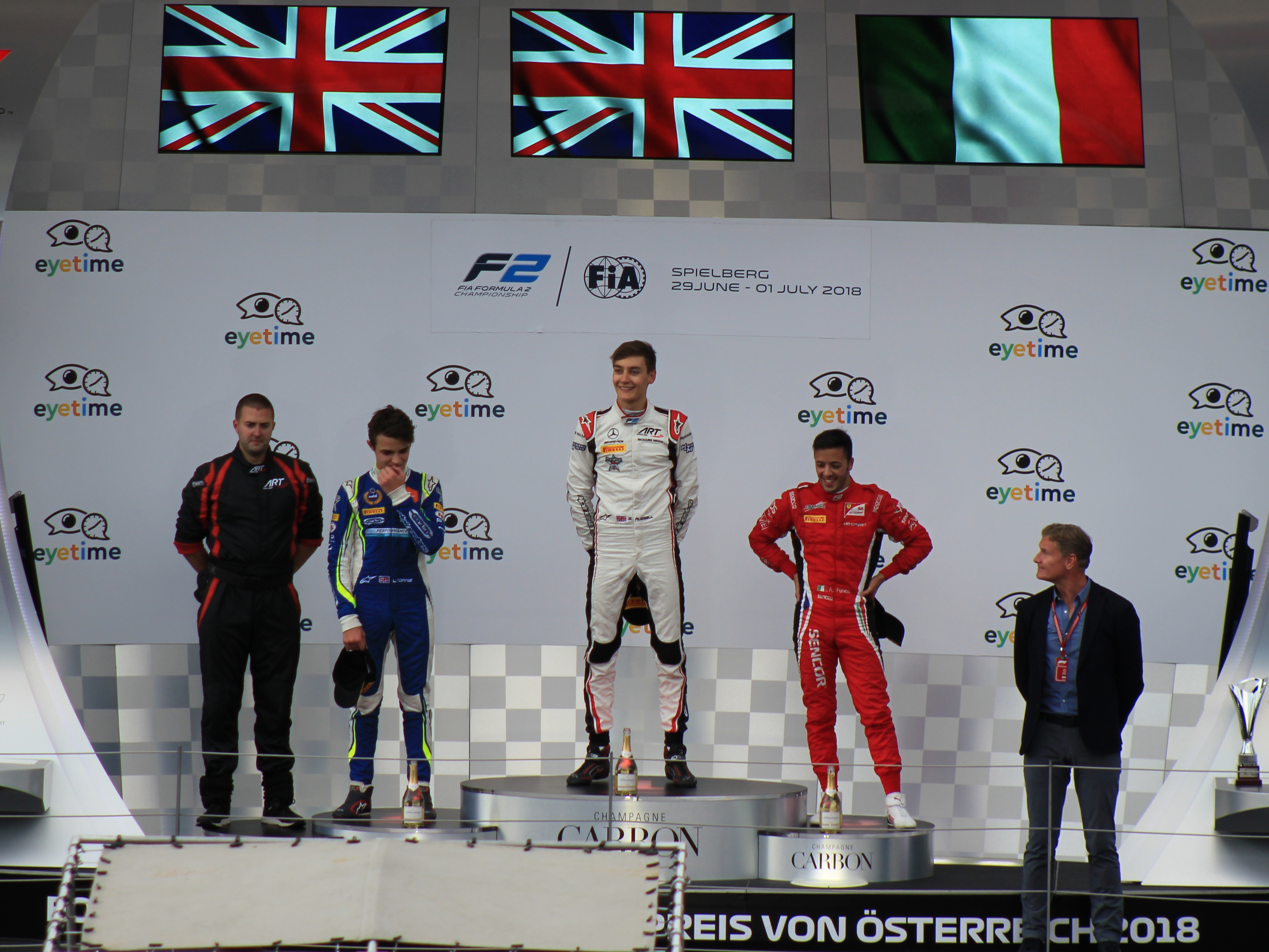
Russell on the podium alongside Lando Norris (left) and Antonio Fuoco (right) after winning the 2018 Spielberg Formula 2 round

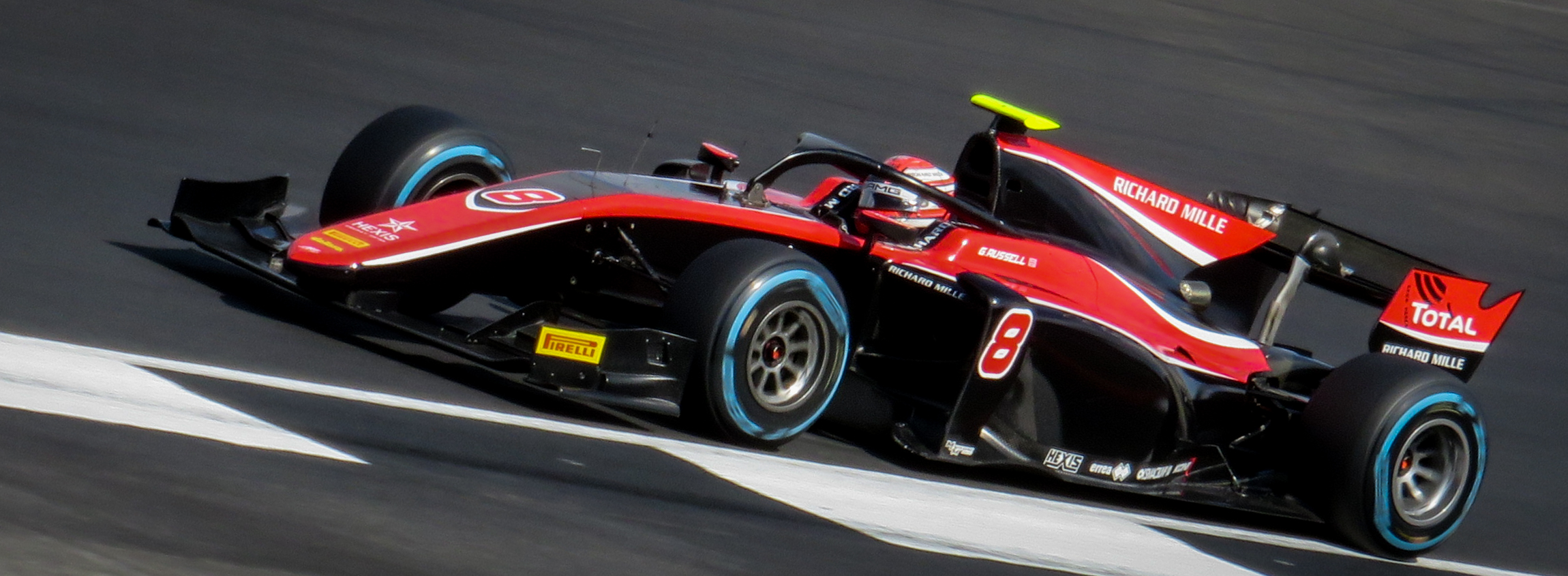
Russell at the 2018 Silverstone Formula 2 round

ART promoted Russell to its Formula Two team for the 2018 season. In addition, Mercedes promoted Russell to first-team reserve driver, sharing duties with Pascal Wehrlein. The 2018 F2 grid was "possibly the strongest field of the last decade", and featured several future F1 racers, including Lando Norris, Alex Albon, Nyck de Vries, and Nicholas Latifi.

ART did not carry over its lopsided dominance from the prior year's F3 season, as Norris's Carlin took the teams' championship. Although Formula Two is a spec series and every engine is built by the same company, Russell, Albon, and Norris agreed that in practice, teams had engines of varying quality. Albon and Norris said that Russell had the best engine that year, while Russell and Albon said that Norris's engine was very competitive early in the season. After ten races, Norris led the standings. Russell heated up at midseason, finishing either first or second in five out of six races. He qualified in the top four at all but one race (where he had engine trouble). He won the title, finishing 68 points ahead of the second-placed Norris.

With his title, Russell became the fifth rookie champion of the GP2/F2 category (previously achieved by Nico Rosberg, Lewis Hamilton, Nico Hülkenberg, and Charles Leclerc), the fourth driver to win the GP3/F3 and GP2/F2 titles in consecutive seasons (after Hamilton, Hülkenberg and Leclerc), and the second driver to win both of these titles as a rookie (after Leclerc). Oscar Piastri and Gabriel Bortoleto subsequently matched each of these feats.

== Formula One career ==
In October 2015, Russell drove a Formula One car for the first time, when he tested the McLaren MP4-26 at Silverstone as a prize for winning the 2014 Autosport BRDC Award. After he joined the Mercedes Junior Team, Mercedes gave him more testing opportunities. He drove a Mercedes for the first time in April 2017, testing the 2015 Mercedes W06 at Portimão. He then conducted formal test drives for Mercedes (2017 and 2018) and Force India-Mercedes (2018).

Russell made his Grand Prix weekend debut at the end of the 2017 season, driving for Force India during free practice at the Brazilian and Abu Dhabi Grands Prix. Mercedes promoted him to first-team reserve driver in 2018.

=== Williams (2019–2021) ===
In October 2018, Mercedes arranged for Russell to make his Formula One debut with engine customer Williams-Mercedes. Russell had previously applied for a Williams drive after winning the 2017 GP3 title, but Williams's Paddy Lowe was unmoved by his new PowerPoint presentation and Russell went to Formula 2. Russell signed a three-year contract with Williams but remained a Mercedes test driver. He was partnered by Robert Kubica for the 2019 season and Nicholas Latifi in 2020 and 2021. His first appearance for Williams was at the 2018 post-season test at Yas Marina Circuit, driving the FW41.

Russell's years at Williams were difficult. Mercedes had hoped that Williams would field a competitive car; as Russell later noted, Williams had finished no worse than fifth in the constructors' standings from 2015 to 2017. However, when Russell joined Williams, the team was well behind the rest of the field and did not produce a car that could reliably compete for points until 2021, Russell's final year with the team. The team was so strapped for cash that it considered replacing Russell with Kevin Magnussen after the 2020 season if Magnussen could find enough sponsor money to keep the team afloat.

Due to Russell's extended run at Williams, he is third on the list of most race starts in a career before scoring points, with 37. However, the Formula One team principals viewed his performances more favorably. In 2020, a year where Russell scored only three points and finished 18th in the standings, the team principals ranked him that year's sixth-best driver. In addition, Russell led Williams back to respectability in 2021, scoring 16 points and recording a rare podium for Williams.

==== 2019–2020: Rookie season and first points ====
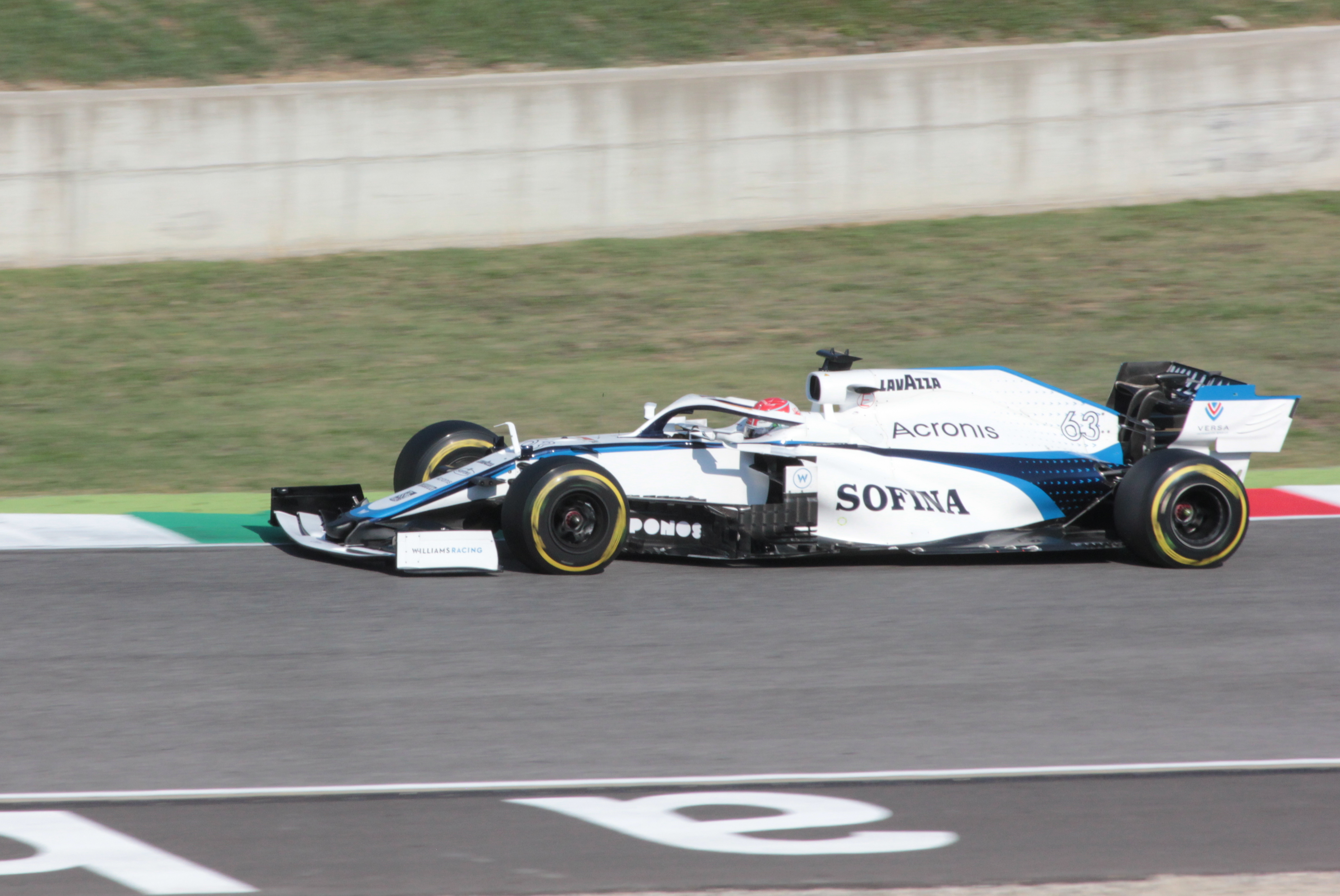
Russell at the 2020 Tuscan Grand Prix, where he finished 11th

In 2019, Williams struggled for form. At Russell's Formula One race debut, the Australian Grand Prix, Russell qualified 19th and finished 16th. He acknowledged that his experience was difficult, remarking that the car was "four seconds off the pace" and that he was lapped multiple times. Williams's slow pace continued into the season, and in most races Kubica was Russell's only on-track competition: Russell did not finish ahead of a car from another team until round six, the Monaco Grand Prix. He also outqualified Kubica at all twenty-one races.

Russell's best placement was 11th at the rain-affected German Grand Prix, where Williams rolled out an upgrade, six cars retired without classifying, and another two cars received time penalties after the race. He came close to finishing tenth, but unsuccessfully asked to pit for slick tyres during a safety car and ran wide on turn two several laps later, allowing Kubica to overtake him and score the team's only point that year. In 2023, Russell remarked that it was the most disappointing moment of his career. Russell also finished 12th at the Brazilian Grand Prix after a late safety car allowed him to unlap himself, missing out on points by 1.668 seconds. He finished 20th in the Drivers' Championship, scoring no points to Kubica's one. Russell later remarked that as a competitor, it was hard for him to watch fellow rookies Alex Albon and Lando Norris competing for points and podiums after beating them the year before in F2.

Williams was more competitive on track in 2020, but it did not show up in the standings, as Williams did not score any points all year. However, Russell came close to scoring on several occasions, such as the Styrian Grand Prix (starting 11th but falling to 16th after running into the gravel during a re-start lap) the British Grand Prix (finishing 12th), the Tuscan Grand Prix (reaching 9th at one point before dropping back to 11th), and the Emilia Romagna Grand Prix (crashing out from tenth place under safety car conditions).

Russell scored his first points at the Sakhir Grand Prix, following a surprise promotion to the Mercedes senior team when Lewis Hamilton tested positive for COVID-19. His performance at Sakhir was widely acclaimed by both Mercedes and the media. He narrowly missed out on pole position, overtook teammate Valtteri Bottas at the first corner, and led the majority of the race. However, he was forced to pit twice in-a-row when the Mercedes pit crew accidentally fitted Bottas's front tyres on his car, following a radio failure. He overtook Bottas a second time, recovered to second place, and was closing in on race leader Sergio Pérez, when a puncture forced him to pit again with ten laps to go. He finished ninth, picking up two points for the finish and one point for the fastest lap. He later remarked that while "I was the same driver [in Sakhir] as I had been before ... I was exactly the same driver a week later [driving for Williams at the season-ending Abu Dhabi Grand Prix] when I was out in Q1." In Abu Dhabi, he donned a special helmet to honor the Williams family, who had sold the team in October. He finished 18th in the Drivers' Championship, scoring three points, all for Mercedes.

==== 2021: Maiden podium ====
Following Russell's strong performances in 2020, Mercedes looked into finding him a new team for the 2021 season, but Williams declined to release him from his contract. In addition, the media speculated that he would replace Valtteri Bottas at Mercedes in 2022 once their respective contracts expired. The two aspirants clashed at the 2021 Emilia Romagna Grand Prix, when Russell found himself alongside Bottas on lap 30. He attempted to overtake Bottas, but drove onto a wet patch and lost control of his car, crashing into Bottas and causing a double retirement. Russell initially blamed the incident on Bottas, walking over to Bottas after the crash and slapping his helmet (Bottas responded with a middle finger), and accusing him of "trying to kill [them] both". However, Russell later retracted his claims and apologised to Bottas and Williams. Mercedes boss Toto Wolff acknowledged that Bottas should not have been side by side with a Williams in the first place, but reserved the bulk of his criticism for Russell, a Mercedes junior who had just taken out a Mercedes. Both drivers sought to downplay the dispute, at least publicly, after Bottas rejoined Mercedes in 2025.

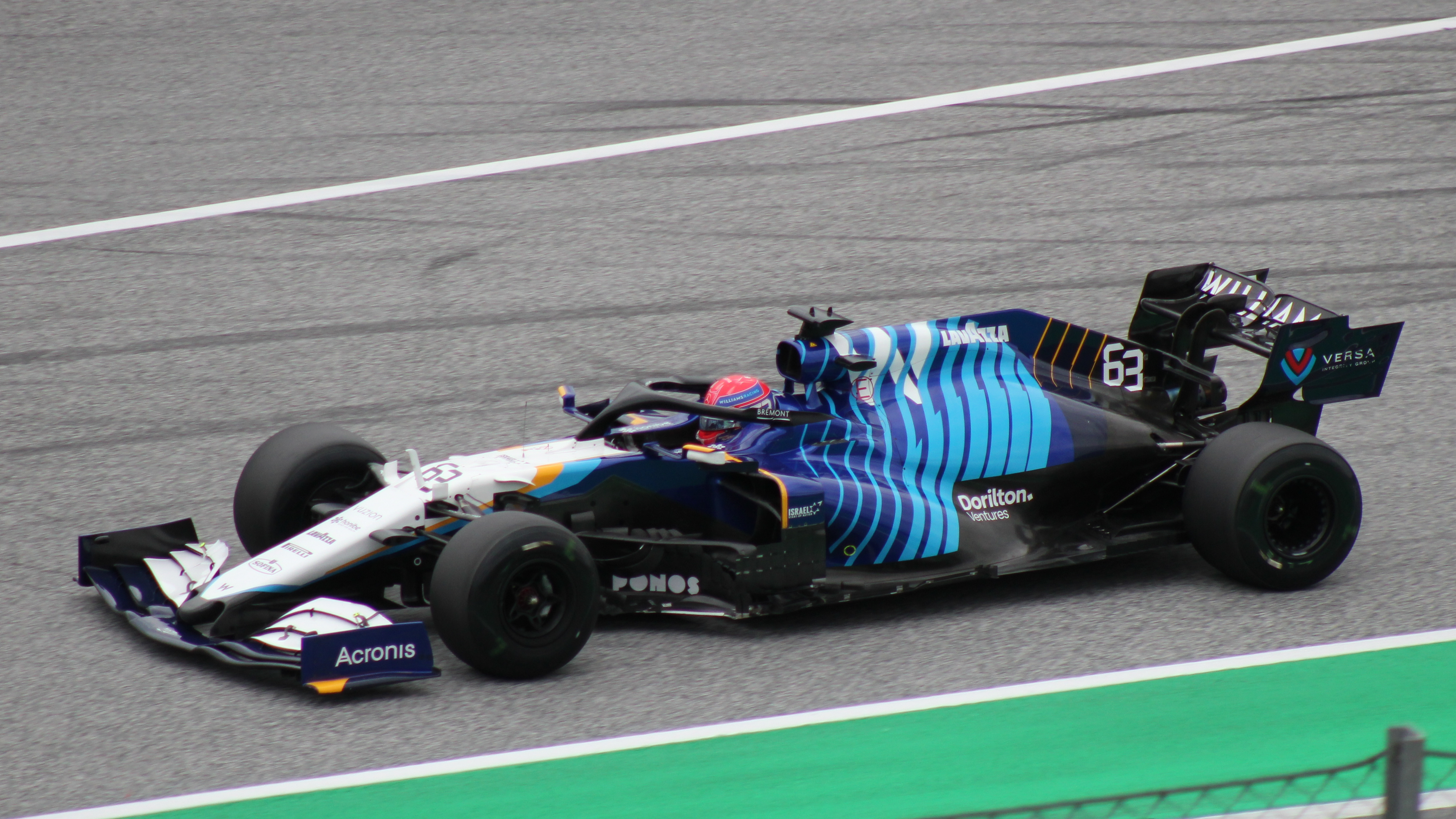
Russell at the 2021 Austrian Grand Prix. He finished 11th, but received praise from Fernando Alonso for his performance.

Despite his DNF at Imola, Russell helped Williams to its best season in several years. He came close to scoring points at a number of races, including the Azerbaijan Grand Prix (gearbox failure following a restart in 15th place); the French Grand Prix (rising from 19th to 12th without help from driver retirements); the Styrian Grand Prix (hydraulic failure after qualifying in tenth); and the British Grand Prix (12th place). At the Austrian Grand Prix, Russell qualified in eighth place, Williams's highest grid position since 2017. He was still in tenth near the end of the race, but after a fourteen-lap defensive battle, Fernando Alonso passed him with three laps to go. After the race, Alonso consoled Russell with a hug. The Spaniard ruefully explained that "I was hoping it was anyone but him. ... He will have more opportunities hopefully for podiums or wins in the future."

Russell scored his first points for Williams two races later at the Hungarian Grand Prix, moving from 17th on the grid to eighth. Following the race, Mercedes agreed to promote Russell to the senior team for the 2022 season. In the very next race, Russell collected his maiden podium at the Belgian Grand Prix under unusual circumstances. He qualified in second after a rain-affected Saturday, the first front-row start for Williams since the 2017 Italian Grand Prix. The downpour continued into race day, so the race director ran the race for two laps under safety car conditions before calling it off, handing Russell his first Formula One podium finish. It was Williams's only podium finish between the 2017 and 2025 Azerbaijan Grands Prix. Russell also scored points at the Italian Grand Prix (ninth) and the Russian Grand Prix (tenth, after qualifying in third). He placed 15th in the Drivers' Championship, scoring 16 points to Latifi's seven.

=== Mercedes (2022–present) ===
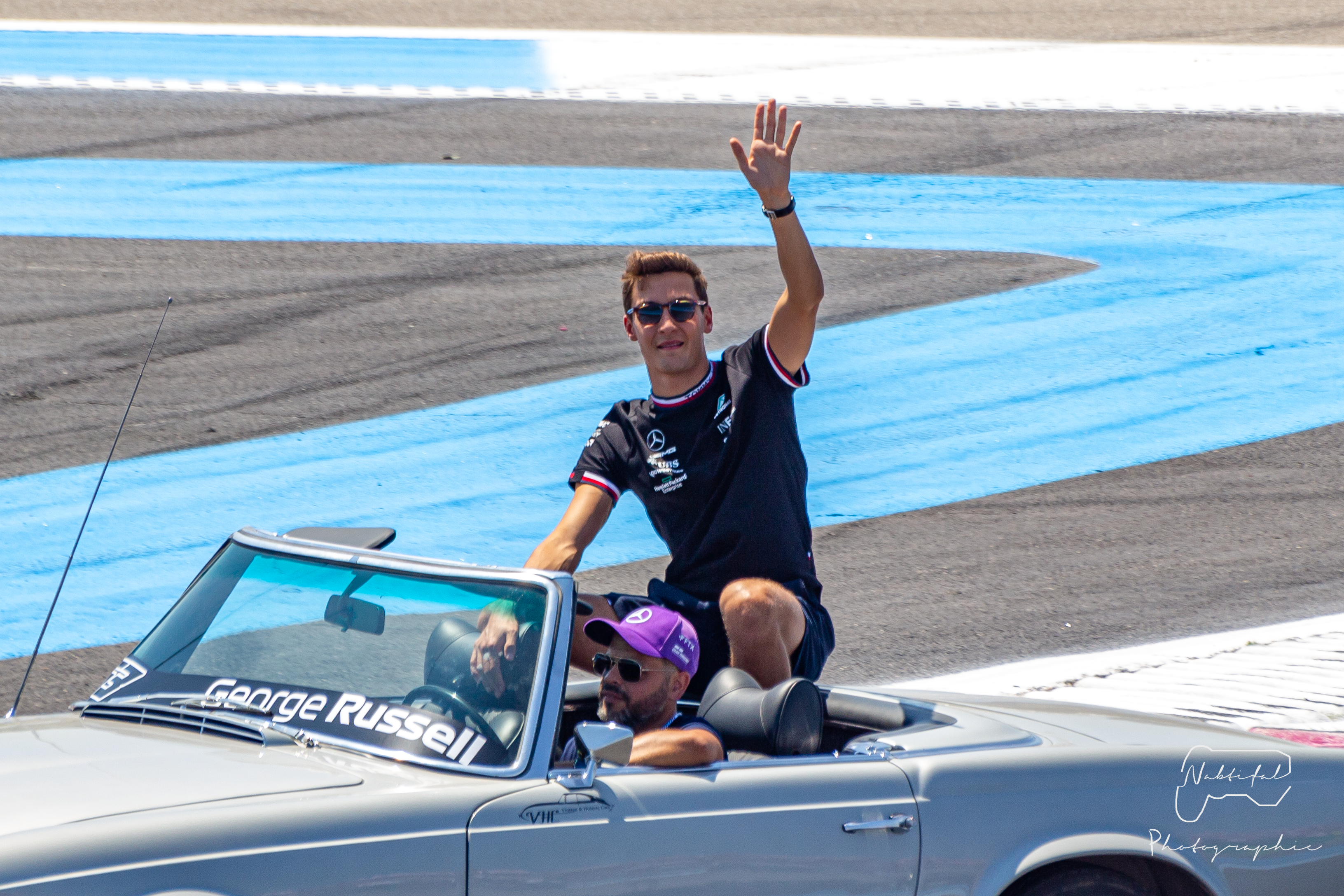
Russell during the drivers' parade at the 2022 French Grand Prix

Russell joined Mercedes in 2022. From 2022 to 2024, he was paired with seven-time World Drivers' Champion Lewis Hamilton. The team placed third in 2022, second in 2023, and fourth in 2024. Hamilton left at the end of the 2024 season and was succeeded by Junior Team member Kimi Antonelli.

==== 2022–2023: Maiden win and pole position ====
The timing of Russell's move to Mercedes was unfortunate, as it coincided with a regulations change that ended Mercedes's dominance of the sport. Mercedes's new aerodynamics concept performed very well in simulations but was difficult to drive in real life. The team scored one victory in the first two years of the ground effect era.

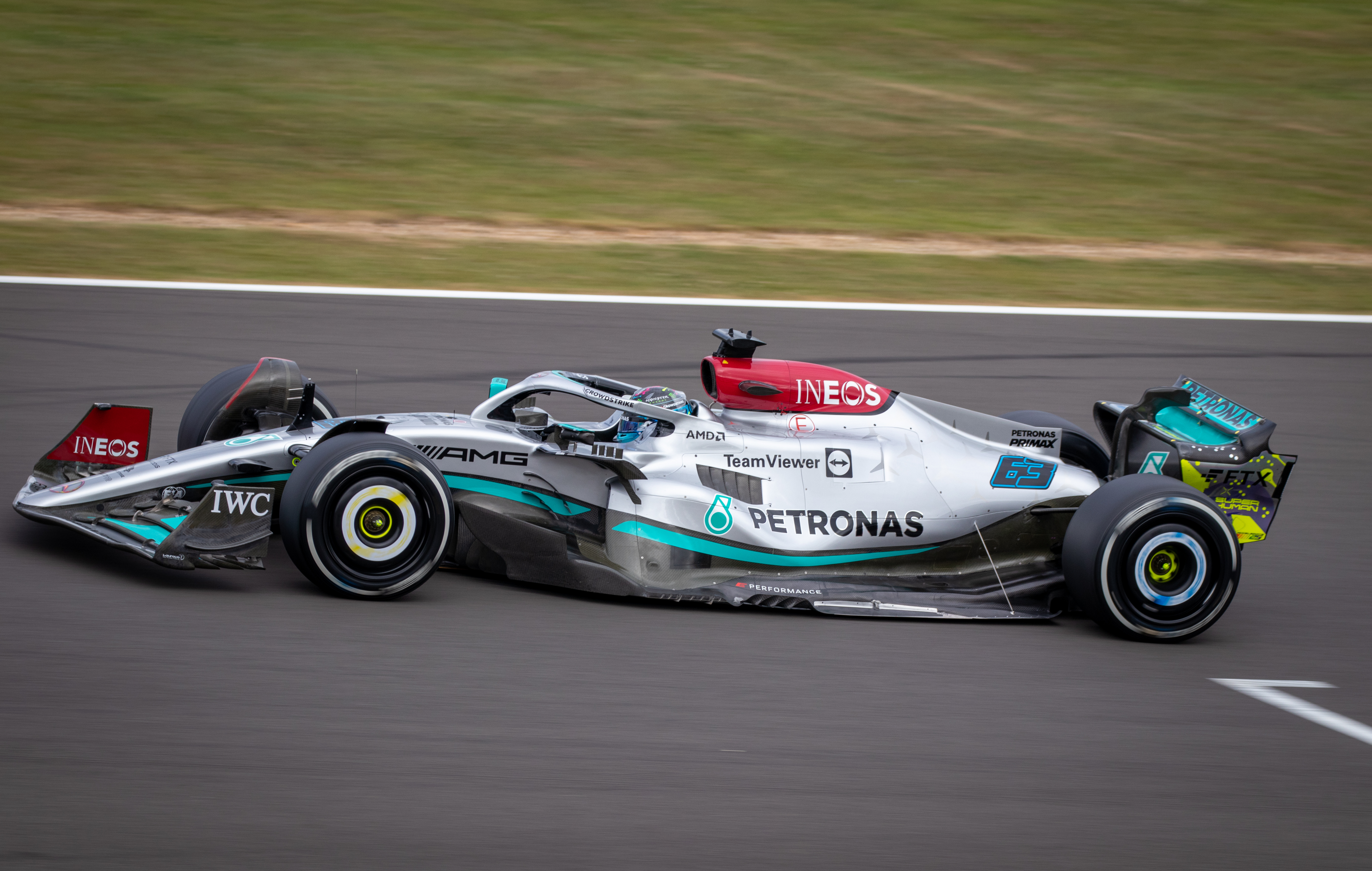
Russell at the 2022 British Grand Prix. Russell achieved his maiden victory at the São Paulo Grand Prix.

Russell and Hamilton spent the first nine races of the 2022 season testing experimental parts for the Mercedes car. Although the drivers swapped testing duties every race, Russell accumulated a 34-point lead over Hamilton after round nine, which team boss Toto Wolff attributed to Hamilton's experiments backfiring. After round nine, Russell and Hamilton finished out the season essentially level on points, with Russell scoring one more point than his teammate. Despite the unfortunate season, Russell checked off several career firsts in 2022, including his first podium in a full-length race at Melbourne; his first pole position at Hungary; and his first Grand Prix and sprint race victories at Interlagos. He finished fourth in the Drivers' Championship, outscoring teammate Hamilton by 35 points.

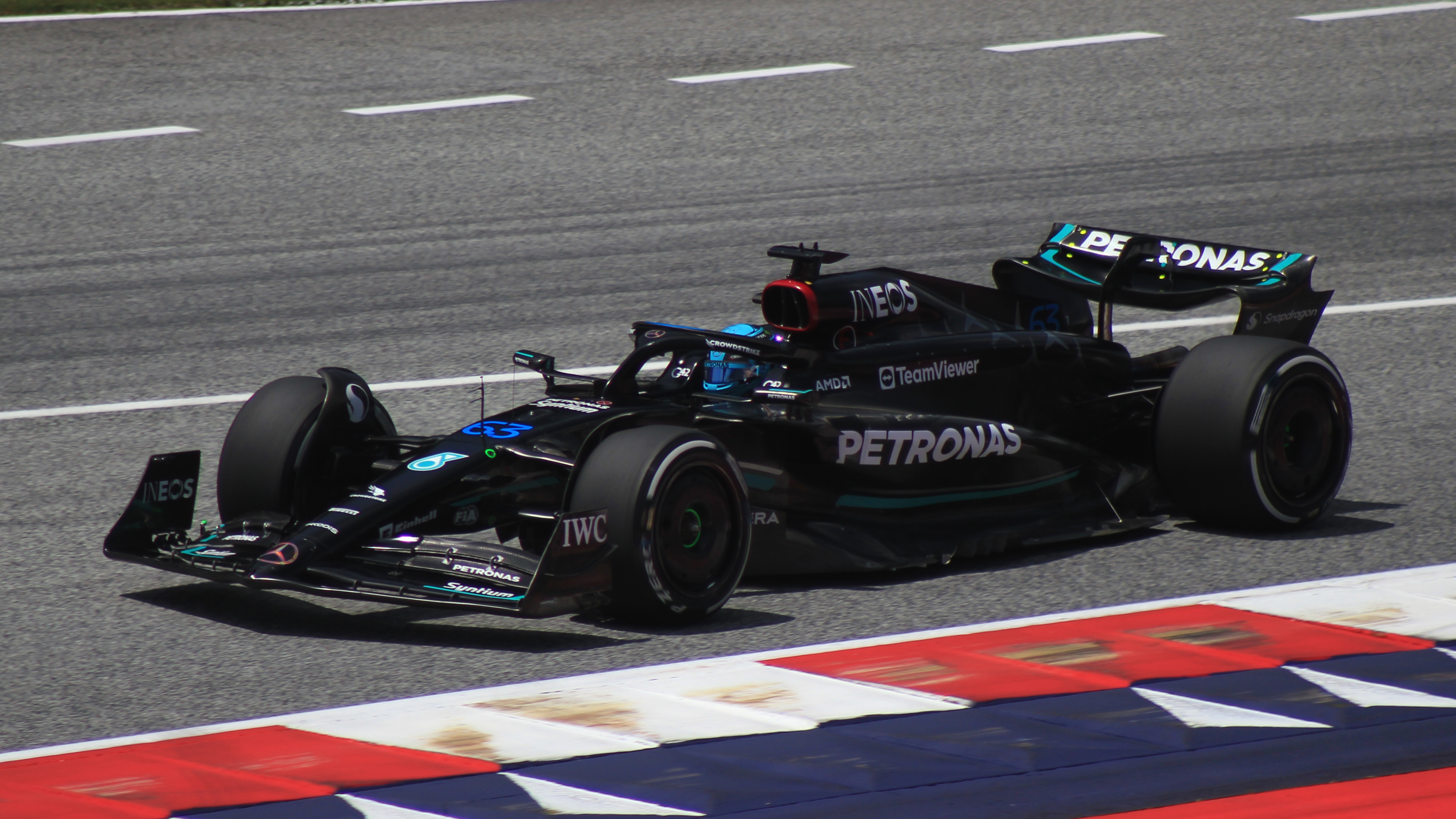
Russell at the 2023 Austrian Grand Prix

2023 was another difficult year for Mercedes and for Russell in particular. After some promising performances at the start of the season (leading the Australian Grand Prix until an untimely red flag and scoring a podium at Barcelona), Russell's results declined in the second half of the season for a variety of reasons, including a record seven pit stops in one race (Zandvoort), an accidental last-lap crash (Singapore), an over-aggressive strategy call (Suzuka), and Hamilton colliding into him after a front-row start (Lusail).

Russell salvaged a measure of pride with a third-place finish at the Abu Dhabi Grand Prix, which clinched second place in the Constructors' Championship for Mercedes. He finished eighth in the Drivers' Championship, the lowest for a Mercedes driver since 2012, and 59 points behind Hamilton. After the Abu Dhabi race, Russell commented that he had "let the side down a couple of times this year", but that it meant "a huge amount" to help the team finish second. Although he called his own season "a complete disaster", Mercedes gave him a two-year contract extension.

==== 2024: Final year with Hamilton ====
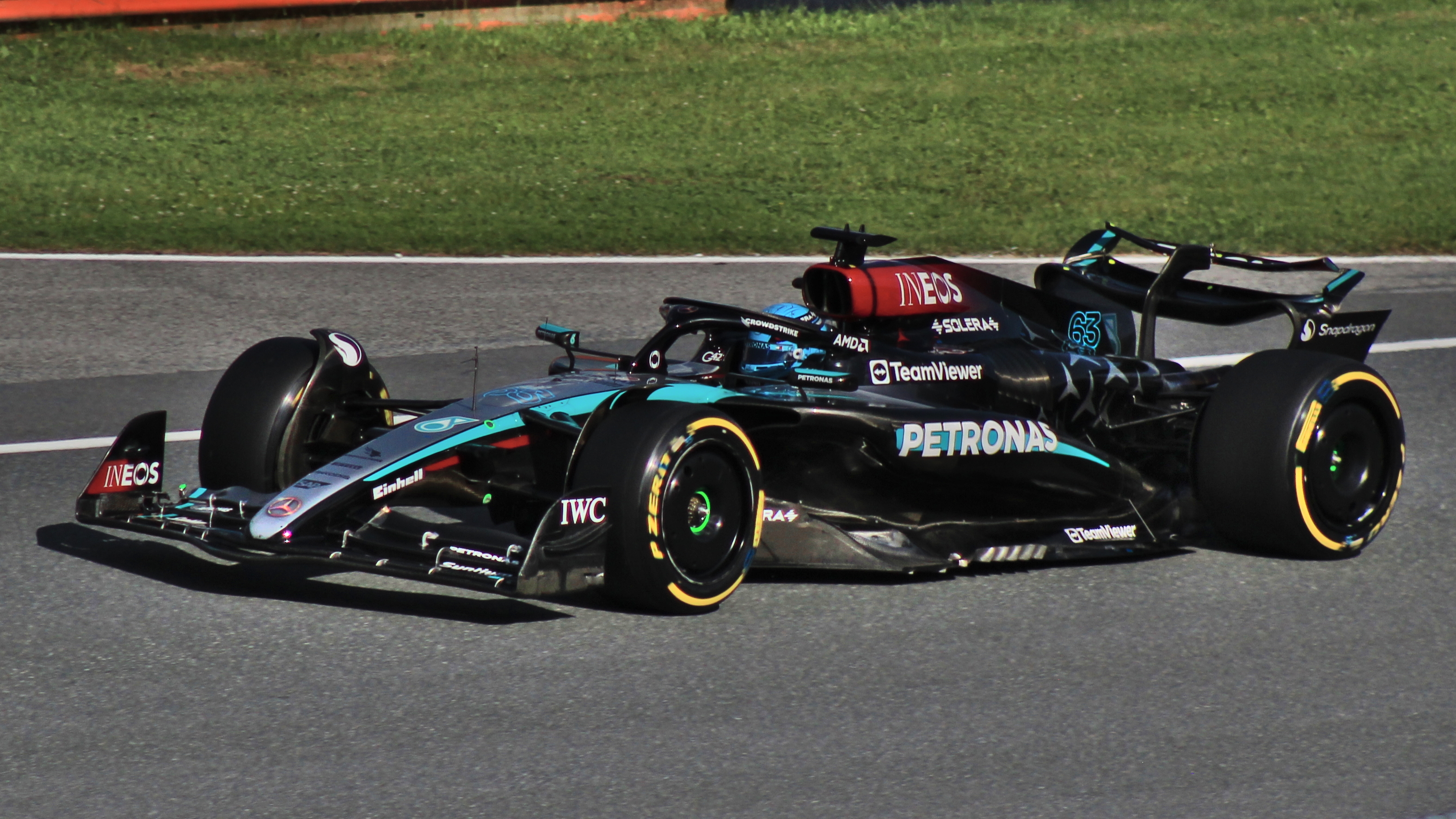
Russell at the 2024 Austrian Grand Prix, where he took his second career win.

For the 2024 season, Mercedes fundamentally changed its design concept. The new Mercedes W15 was fast but inconsistent, hard on tyres, and difficult to set up properly. Although the team was not competitive until midseason, Russell commented that the staff was "making progress" behind the scenes. At round three, the Australian Grand Prix, Russell crashed heavily while trying to overtake Fernando Alonso (who received a 20-second penalty for brake-checking Russell) for sixth place on the penultimate lap. The accident left him immobile and defenceless behind a 250 km/h blind turn for ten seconds before the race director deployed the virtual safety car. However, he emerged unscathed and met with Alonso to smooth things over. Following the race, he called for automated safety cars to prevent similar incidents.

Come the midseason, Mercedes scored podium finishes in six consecutive races. Russell reeled off some of his best results in years, including a pole and podium in Montreal, his second career race victory at Spielberg (albeit after the first two drivers collided in front of him), a pole at Silverstone (followed by a mechanical retirement), and the first Formula One race win (at Spa) lost to a post-race disqualification since 1994, for which the team took responsibility. However, the media opined that he could have won the Canadian Grand Prix.

The team's form became more inconsistent as the year went on, but Russell challenged for wins at several races. At the São Paulo Grand Prix, Russell was leading the race until Mercedes ordered him to pit for new tyres right before a red-flag gave his competitors a free tyre change. Russell dominated the Las Vegas Grand Prix, qualifying on pole and leading 49 of 50 laps to take his third career victory. Russell again qualified on pole in Qatar after Max Verstappen was handed a grid penalty for driving unnecessarily slowly ahead of Russell, who was on an out-lap. Verstappen condemned Russell's appeals to the stewards for his penalty, stating he "lost all respect" for him, and warned Russell that he would overtake him at any cost—Russell claimed he said he would 'put him in the wall', which Verstappen denied. Verstappen overtook him into turn one, with Russell finishing fourth after two safety car periods.

Russell finished sixth in the Drivers' Championship, 22 points ahead of Hamilton. The team fell from second place to fourth in the Constructors' Championship, but scored four wins, quadrupling its total from the prior two seasons.

During the three years of the Russell-Hamilton partnership, the Mercedes drivers were evenly matched on track. Russell outscored Hamilton in two out of three seasons, recorded three wins to Hamilton's two, and outqualified Hamilton 39–29, while Hamilton scored 20 podiums to Russell's 14 and beat Russell on total points (697–695) after overtaking Russell on the final lap of his final race with Mercedes. After the 2024 season ended, Russell said that he "learned so much from [Hamilton] as a driver and a person," and wrote on his personal website that Hamilton "is not only the greatest driver of all time," but also "the type of person that every racing driver should aspire to be."

==== 2025: Contract year ====
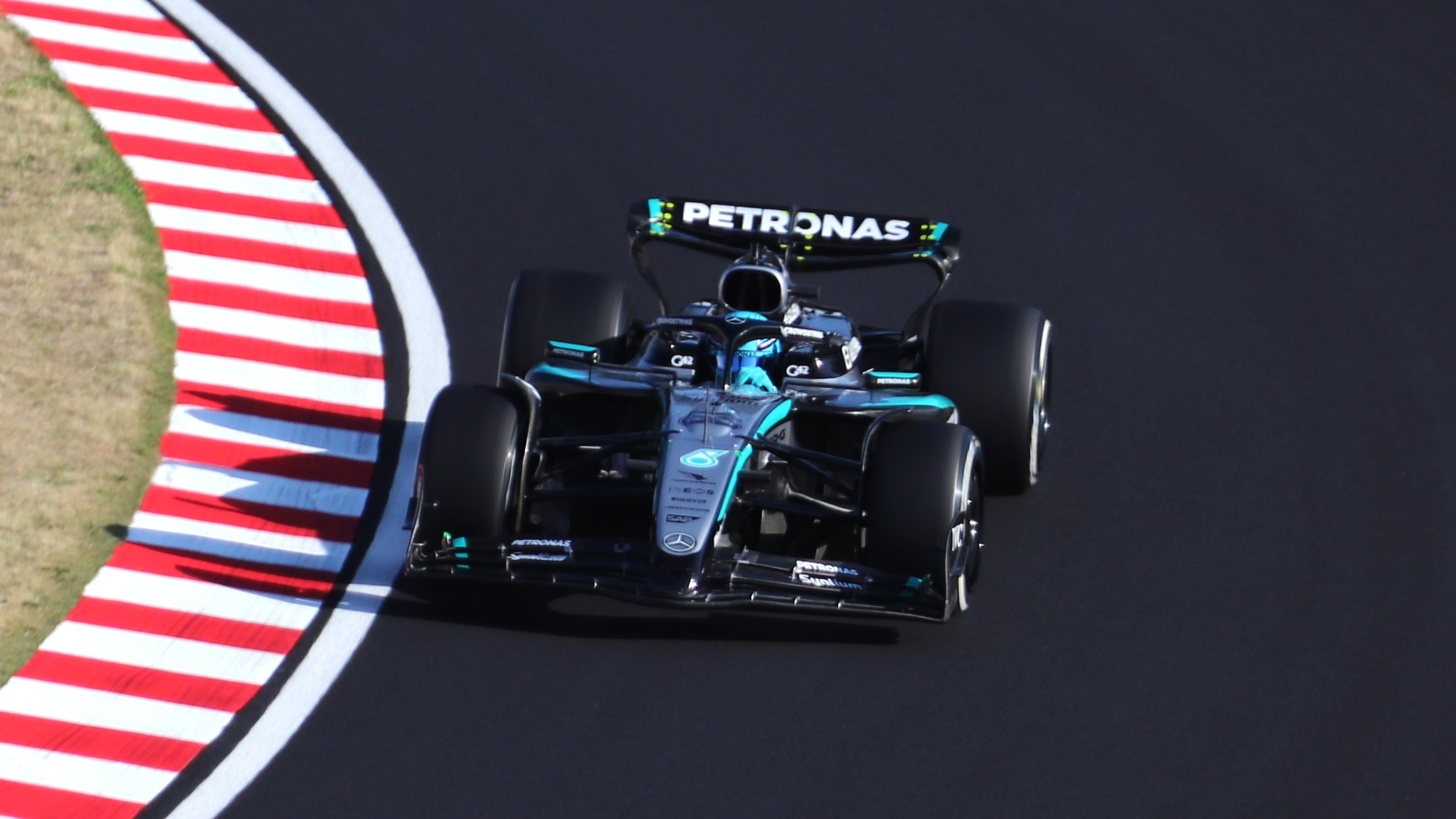
Russell (pictured at the Japanese Grand Prix) was partnered by rookie Andrea Kimi Antonelli in 2025.

In 2025, Russell faced a contract year. He also received a new teammate, eighteen-year-old academy driver Kimi Antonelli, who was hyped as "F1's next big thing." Defending World Constructors' Champions McLaren were heavily favoured to claim both titles, and did. At the start of the season, Russell opined that the MCL39 was fast enough to win every Grand Prix. McLaren dismissed Russell's prediction as hyperbolic, but it proceeded to dominate the constructors' race with seven 1–2 finishes and 12 wins in the first 18 races. In addition, McLaren's Lando Norris was crowned Drivers' Champion at the final race of the season.

Russell opened the season with four podiums in six races at Albert Park, Shanghai, Sakhir, and Miami, predominantly trailing one or both McLarens. In Australia, he raced conservatively in intermittently rainy conditions and inherited third place when Oscar Piastri went off track. At Shanghai, Russell qualified second for the main race, splitting the two McLarens; strong teamwork from McLaren allowed Lando Norris to pass him at turn one, and Russell finished third. After an uneventful fifth-place finish at Suzuka with almost no overtaking within the top 10, Russell bounced back in Bahrain: he fended off Norris in the closing laps to finish second—overcoming faulty brakes and electronics—and received widespread praise from the racing press for his adaptive performance. (Note: Per several sources:) Struggling with tyre overheating, Mercedes laboured to fifth- and sixth-place finishes in Jeddah. At Miami, Russell was out-qualified by Antonelli for the first time, before an unconventional decision to start the Grand Prix on hard tyres was rewarded with a near-free pit stop under virtual safety car conditions, helping him finish third.

Mercedes began testing major upgrades during the Imola-Monaco-Barcelona tripleheader, but the team generally lacked the pace to compete for wins. The Mercedes W16's new suspension was particularly enigmatic: introduced at Imola, it was withdrawn after one middling race. The team reintroduced it at Montreal three rounds later, and Russell controlled the race from start to finish, picking up his maiden Formula One hat-trick (taking pole, winning, and setting the fastest lap). However, the improvement quickly faded, and at Spa-Francorchamps, Russell noted that the temperamental W16 was struggling even in relatively favourable conditions. Mercedes reverted to the older suspension at Hungary one round later, and Russell scored a podium after hunting down Charles Leclerc, whose car was dramatically fading. Aside from those two podiums, Russell's next-best finish was a chaotic fourth-place at Barcelona where he qualified fourth, lost two places at the start, undercut Lewis Hamilton, passed fourth-placed Max Verstappen in the closing laps after a safety car restart, and was hit by Verstappen on track near the end of the race, for which the Dutchman expressed regret. (Note: After tussling with Russell and Charles Leclerc, Verstappen was asked to give back fourth place to Russell, which proved to be a strategy error on Red Bull's part. An infuriated Verstappen slowed down before bumping wheels with Russell (he ultimately gave up the place and received a ten-second penalty). Verstappen said that his move was "not right and shouldn't have happened", but claimed it was a "misjudgment"; several commentators thought it was intentional.) Verstappen received a time penalty for hitting Russell, which cost him nine championship points. Ironically, after a late-season charge, Verstappen closed most of the gap to Lando Norris in the Drivers' Championship, but lost the title by two points.

Following the summer break, Russell finished fifth at Monza. He then scored his seventh podium of the season at Baku with a second-place finish, having struggled with a respiratory illness all weekend. The next round at Singapore, Russell surprised commentators by taking pole by 0.182 seconds on a track where Mercedes was not expected to be competitive. After Verstappen (who started second) unsuccessfully gambled on used soft tyres at the start, Russell got out to a large lead and cruised to victory. After the win, Mercedes announced that Russell had re-signed for the 2026 season; it later extended the deal to 2027. The team reportedly raised his salary to £30m/year, making him the third-highest-paid driver in Formula One after Verstappen and Hamilton. The team's focus shifted to 2026, and Russell scored one podium in the final six races, at Las Vegas, where he dealt with steering and tyre issues. It was his career-best ninth podium of the season.

Russell finished fourth in the Drivers' Championship with 319 points, 169 ahead of Antonelli. Mercedes returned to second in the Drivers' Championship. At the end of the season, Autosport ranked Russell the second-best driver in motorsport, between Verstappen and Álex Palou. The Daily Telegraph, The Race, The Athletic, and Autoevolution ranked Russell the second-best driver in Formula One, in each case behind Verstappen and ahead of title-winner Norris. In Formula One's official polls, the team principals ranked him fourth and the drivers ranked him third. Motor Sport ranked him fifth, although its writers considered slotting him ahead of Norris and Piastri.

==== 2026: Curtailed title challenge vs. Antonelli ====
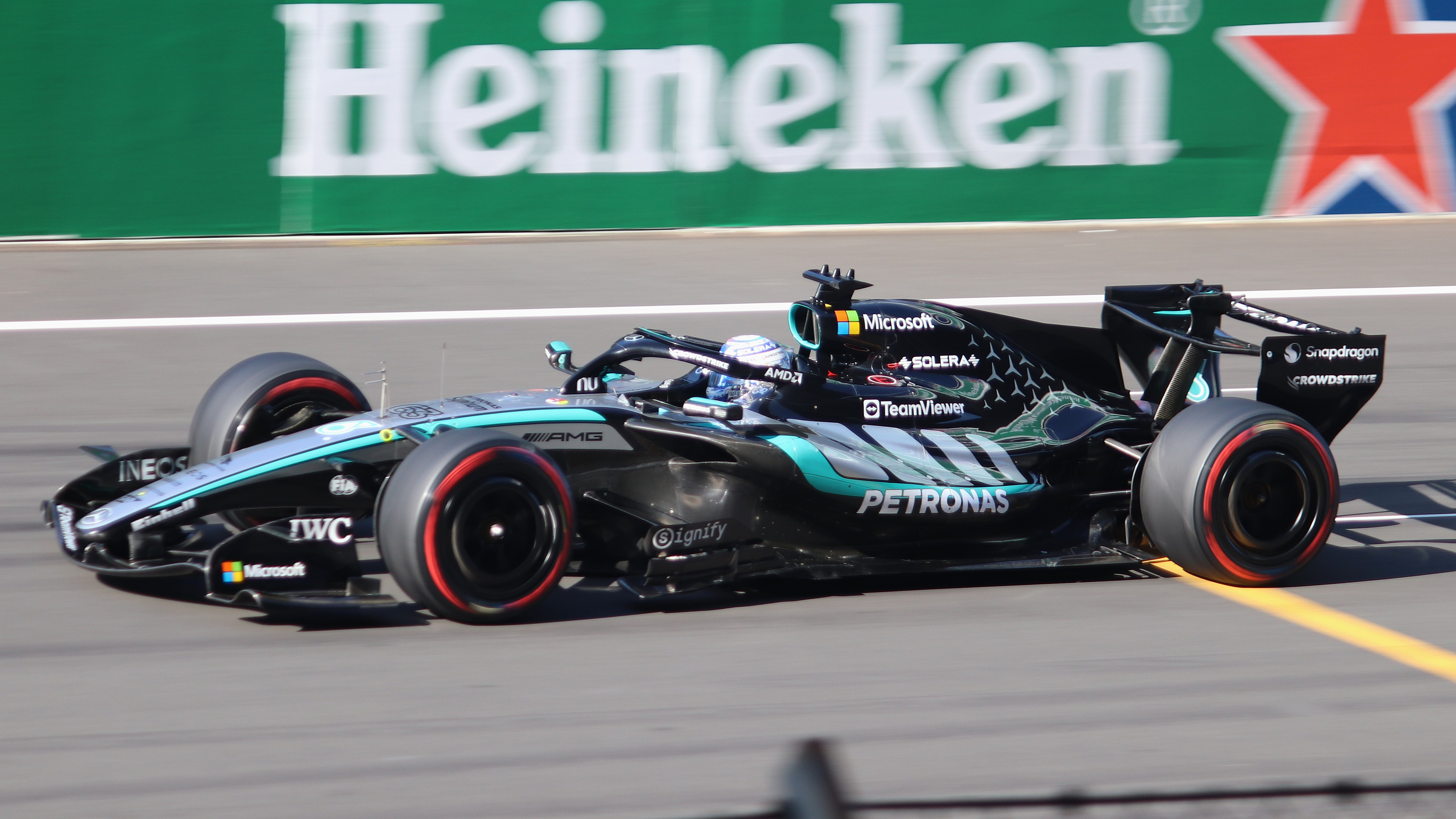
Russell driving the W17 at the 2026 Chinese Grand Prix

Heading into a major regulation change, pundits and bookies predicted that Mercedes would have a strong season. Russell sought to manage expectations before the season, but at the season-opening Australian Grand Prix, he took pole three-tenths of a second over teammate Antonelli and eight-tenths of a second over third-placed Isack Hadjar. Autosport called the margin "staggering." He won the race after an extended battle with Ferrari's Charles Leclerc in the opening laps. Russell claimed the net lead when Mercedes pitted under virtual safety car on lap 12 and Ferrari stayed out, gambling for a second safety car later in the race. That gamble failed, so Russell and Antonelli nursed their tyres for 46 laps and cruised to a 1–2 finish. With the win, Russell claimed the Drivers' Championship lead for the first time in his career. However, despite his victory in Melbourne, Russell's fortunes would begin to take a serious turn for the worse, be it through reliability issues or self-inflicted mistakes, to his teammate Antonelli's benefit.

At the Shanghai sprint race, the Australia pattern repeated, and Russell and Ferrari's Lewis Hamilton traded the lead six times in the first five laps before Hamilton's tyres faded. However, at the Grand Prix, Russell lost pole to Antonelli after technical issues in qualifying. He spent much of the race in traffic with the Ferraris, and finished second, while Antonelli eventually reached clear air and won comfortably. Antonelli then seized the championship lead at Suzuka, where Russell's race was marred by setup and electronic issues and an ill-timed pit stop. At Miami, Russell beat Antonelli in the sprint, but the Italian beat him on merit in the Grand Prix. Russell hoped to bounce back at Montreal. He won the sprint after a race-long duel with Antonelli, and looked to repeat the feat in the Grand Prix, again repeating a duel with his teammate, but retired from the lead with an engine failure. Now 43 points behind his teammate, things went from bad to worse at Monaco, where Russell failed to score at all after a disappointing qualifying, a self-inflicted time penalty, and a team-inflicted drive-through penalty, ultimately finishing in twelfth. Ultimately, the bookmakers' title favourite at the start of the season found himself in third place after the conclusion of the race, 68 points behind Antonelli and two points behind Hamilton.

Russell began clawing back at Barcelona. He was the leading driver in two out of three practice sessions and took pole position, but his luck was alternately bad and good: Hamilton seized the lead and won after Russell (again) pitted right before a virtual safety car, and, late into the race, Antonelli passed Russell after Mercedes accidentally changed Russell's race setup during a pit stop. However, Russell still picked up 18 points on Antonelli, who retired with an engine failure. Russell's stars aligned at Spielberg; after running behind Antonelli in two out of three practice sessions, Russell converted his pole position to a dominating second race win of the season; in doing so, he took second in the Drivers' Championship back from Hamilton. Antonelli qualified fourth after misreading the yellow flag signal during his final qualifying lap, and was unlucky himself to pit right before a virtual safety car. Silverstone went similarly to Barcelona: Antonelli beat Russell in the sprint race and was on pace to win the Grand Prix, while Russell's race seemed ruined after a puncture forced yet another pit stop before a virtual safety car. However, Russell finished second, passing Lewis Hamilton by gambling (correctly) that the race would end under safety car conditions; Antonelli initially fell to ninth after part of his car's bodywork broke, and a time penalty dropped him out of the points.

His fortunes tumbled once more at Belgium, where he qualified fourth to Antonelli's pole. During the opening lap of the Grand Prix, he was hit by Hamilton on the run to Les Combes, beaching him and forcing him to retire. The contact also inflicted damage to his Mercedes' bodywork. Having begun the weekend 25 points behind Antonelli in the Drivers' Championship, his younger teammate won the Grand Prix to extend his advantage, 50 points ahead; he himself dropped to third behind Hamilton. Following the race, Russell did not put the blame for his retirement on Hamilton, who received a penalty for the incident. He stated that the contact was a racing incident and criticised an electrical issue that diminished his engine's power and disallowed battery deployment across Eau Rouge, leaving him vulnerable to other drivers going across the Kemmel Straight, reiterating his criticisms from his team radio message shortly following the incident. He won at Azerbaijan after taking pole position, surviving the two safety car restarts, and leading every lap of the race to take his eighth career victory finishing ahead of Max Verstappen. He also secured the fastest lap to take his first career grand slam. A tricky weekend at the returning Sepang International Circuit for the first running of the Bahrain Grand Prix in Malaysia ensued, where his team brought major upgrades to combat McLaren and Red Bull's advantage. Russell qualified in eighth for a delayed race, and he and Antonelli immediately passed polesitter Verstappen to take a 1-2. Russell contended with Verstappen and Antonelli following the retirement of a Cadillac, and settled to third behind his teammate. After the retirement of a Williams that led to a full safety car, Russell retired with a power unit issue, extending Antonelli's lead above him to 84 points.

The Singapore Grand Prix saw Russell take second in sprint qualification. He took a lap-one lead, again from Verstappen, but ended up losing it the following lap due to a spin, retiring on the spot due to damage. He struggled during the actual race, qualifying sixth and dropping to the bottom due to a penalty. Russell finished ninth, while Antonelli finished third, extending the latter's lead further to 102 points. At the United States Grand Prix, he qualified in sixth, left the track while attacking Isack Hadjar, and gained a five-second penalty. He finished eighth, denying race winner Antonelli his championship, which would now be decided at the following race at Mexico. While Russell did start ahead of Antonelli for the race, qualifying in second, he hit a Red Bull - Hadjar again - obtaining a ten-second penalty in the process. With Antonelli securing his title by finishing in third, Russell finished in sixth, with Verstappen and polesitter Hamilton moving ahead of him in the standings (dropping to fourth, at 250 points) with Charles Leclerc only five points behind.

The Drivers' Championship now decided, Russell was now fighting for second. However, Russell's struggles compounded at São Paulo: he had flashes of speed in qualifying, but heavy rain in Q3 curtailed the drivers' attempts to set further hotlaps. Russell was forced to do one hotlap, where he was being impeded by Alexander Albon. After voicing his complaints about the Albon incident, he was subsequently told to abort further lap attempts. Russell, whose frustrations over the season he had boiled over, insisted that his lap was good enough for provisional pole position and voiced his frustrations over further laps being aborted on the radio, to which team principal Toto Wolff responded by telling him he was in second place. Indeed, Russell dropped to seventh with penalties applied. He then spun during his first pit stop during the Grand Prix, dropping him out of the points, and eventually passed Antonelli during the race to secure fourth and fifth. Mercedes was able to secure their first Constructors' Championship since 2021. In the Drivers' Championship, Russell, at 262 points, barely retook third after former teammate Lewis Hamilton, who left the weekend only one point behind him, spun during the race. His struggles carried over to a weekend in Las Vegas where he was otherwise fast and in contention for the podium and the win. Topping both practice sessions and landing second behind Max Verstappen, who he collided with during the third practice session, he fought for the lead with Verstappen and Isack Hadjar until a safety car neutralised the race. On the restart, Russell continued to hound Verstappen, and later Lando Norris and Oscar Piastri, for the podium after Hadjar's front wing took itself out of contention. However, Russell, in a repeat of his incident at Singapore three years earlier, hit a piece of Hadjar's front wing, locked up, and hit the wall on turn five. This time, he was able to continue without damage, but his race was so compromised that Carlos Sainz Jr. passed him in the backmarker Williams for eighth. During an interview following the race, Verstappen remarked as a response to Russell's criticisms of him following the third practice crash that his comments did not matter as he was "so far below [Verstappen]'s level". In the Drivers' Championship, Russell dropped to fourth once more, with Verstappen and Hamilton overtaking him, and was now level on points with Lando Norris.

==== 2027 ====
Russell and Antonelli are contracted to remain at Mercedes for the 2027 season.

== Driver profile ==
=== Driving style ===
In general, Russell favours smooth inputs, car control, and using the entire width of the track to exit a corner. He has specifically been noted for controlling cars that are unstable when entering corners. Jolyon Palmer notes that Russell takes particularly wide exits to generate as much speed as possible, and said that Russell's precise car control allows him to survive risky turns. Russell's style takes advantage of high-grip tracks and high-downforce cars.

Russell's racing has been described as "analytical" and "situational," and he adapts his driving to track and car conditions. After Mercedes announced Russell's promotion to the senior team from Williams, Williams's Dave Robson highlighted his driver's adaptability. In his junior and early career, Russell's smooth driving style was compared to that of Jenson Button. However, Robson suggested that Russell sought to strike a balance between Button and Lewis Hamilton. Since joining Mercedes, Russell adapted his driving to take more aggressive and direct V-shaped approaches into corners, drawing comparisons to Mika Häkkinen. Even so, compared to his former teammate Lewis Hamilton, Russell braked earlier, turned later, and "carrie[d] more speed through the corner and exiting it."

During the 2024 season, the racing press suggested that Russell's style might be a better fit for the ground effect cars F1 was using at the time than Hamilton's. Mark Hughes added that Mercedes's successful midseason upgrades accentuated this F1-wide trend. On the other hand, The Race suggested that the 2026 regulation change hurt Russell by de-emphasizing downforce.

=== Qualifying ===
Throughout his career, Russell has consistently been praised for his qualifying pace. At Williams, the Briton drove an unimpressive car to unexpectedly high grid placements on several occasions, most notably Spa 2021 (second) and Sochi 2021 (third). He outqualified teammates Robert Kubica and Nicholas Latifi 57 out of 59 times. Russell acquired the nickname "Mr. Saturday" for his Williams qualifying feats, although he has downplayed the nickname, explaining that the goal is to win on Sunday.

At Mercedes, Russell became the only teammate in Lewis Hamilton's career (Hamilton being Formula One's all-time leader in pole positions) to outqualify him head-to-head during their time as teammates (39–29). Although Hamilton outqualified Russell 13–9 in their first season together, Russell reached parity in 2023 and beat Hamilton 19–5 in 2024, becoming one of only two teammates (the other being 2016 champion Nico Rosberg) to outqualify him in a single season.

=== Racecraft ===
According to Karun Chandhok, Russell "is generally one of the cleanest racers" in F1. Several drivers have noted Russell's clean racing on track, including teammate Lewis Hamilton and Sebastian Vettel. In addition, at the 2022 British Grand Prix, Russell jumped out of his car to check on Zhou Guanyu following a major first-lap crash, even though it triggered his own retirement from the race. (The crash occurred after Pierre Gasly and Russell collided at the start of the race, bumping Russell into Zhou.) However, after Russell questioned Charles Leclerc's defensive tactics during the 2023 British Grand Prix, Ferrari team principal Frédéric Vasseur noted that Russell had used similar tactics to defend his position in prior races, explaining that "that's life" in Formula One.

Russell's racecraft has received some criticism, as Russell has not always converted high grid placements into high finishes. As a rookie, Russell was plagued by poor starts; that year, "he started lap two behind [teammate Robert] Kubica 11 times despite his qualifying superiority." More broadly, it took Russell two and a half seasons to score his first points at Williams. The Race responded that Russell's race day struggles at Williams were primarily the fault of the car, reasoning that Russell's strong grid placements at Williams were "in a constant battle against regression to the mean," and it was "inevitable that his Sunday results [were] less impressive." During Russell's years at Williams, Fernando Alonso said that Russell had great natural speed and "surprises me every weekend". Following Russell's second-place finish at the 2025 Bahrain Grand Prix, Peter Windsor called Russell's drive "one of the best I've seen in a long, long time", praising his tyre management (Russell nursed a set of used soft tyres for over twenty laps), on-the-fly adjustments to various mechanical issues, and defensive positioning against third-placed Lando Norris, who had the faster car and the tyre advantage at the end of the race.

Russell's tyre management has alternately been praised and criticised. He was praised for his tyre management at Williams. Upon joining Mercedes, he overextended his tyres on several occasions, contributing to some disappointing results. His tyre management received renewed praise during the 2024 season, following strong performances at Spa, Austin, and Monaco.

Although Russell prioritized consistency during his first season with Mercedes, he began taking greater risks in the following seasons, and committed several high-profile mistakes, notably during the 2024 Canadian Grand Prix, where Motor Sport thought he botched Mercedes's first real chance at a win since 2022. Following that race, Russell admitted that he "need[s] to dial down the risk/reward [ratio] of how hard I'm driving," but explained that "I'd prefer finishing P6 every race and having two victories rather than finishing P5, P4, P3 every race and not get the race victory." He picked up two victories later that season. His 2025 season was praised for its consistency, with The Race remarking that Russell was "the only driver who made fewer significant errors than [Max] Verstappen in 2025."

=== Records and statistical oddities ===
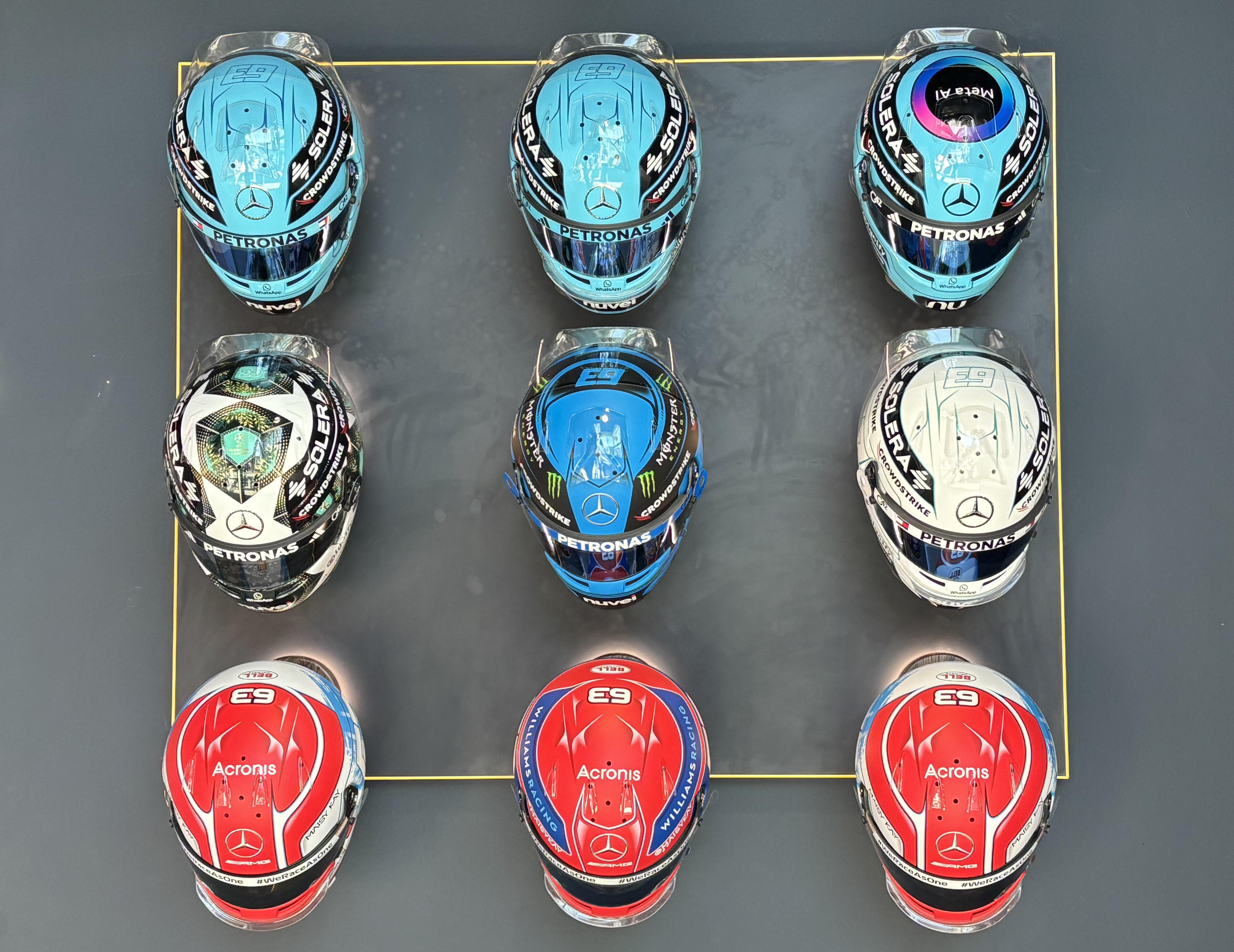
Russell's helmets from 2019 to 2025 on display at Silverstone

Russell holds the record for most pit stops in a single race (7 at the 2023 Dutch Grand Prix), shared with Lance Stroll, Liam Lawson, and Alain Prost. Russell, Stroll, and Lawson all tied Prost's record at the same race.

Russell and Max Verstappen are one of two sets of drivers to tie for P1 in qualifying in Formula One history, at the 2024 Canadian Grand Prix. Previously, Jacques Villeneuve, Michael Schumacher, and Heinz-Harald Frentzen tied in qualifying at the 1997 European Grand Prix. He tied with Verstappen again at the 2025 Spanish Grand Prix, this time for P3.

At the 2024 Belgian Grand Prix, Russell became the sixth driver in Formula One history to lose a race win by disqualification.

== Other ventures ==
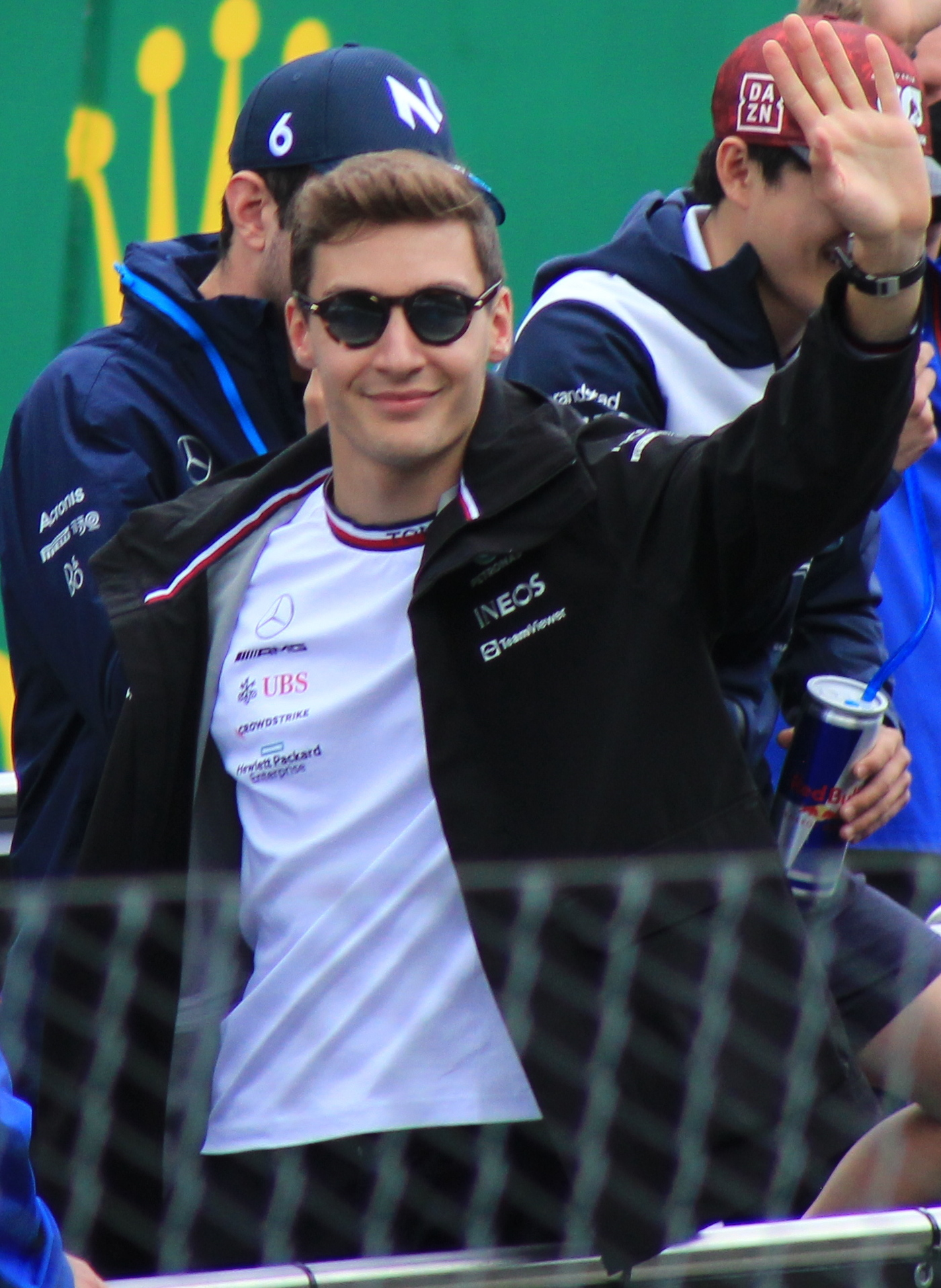
Russell at the 2022 Austrian Grand Prix

Since 2021, Russell has served as a director of the Grand Prix Drivers' Association (GPDA), the Formula One drivers' trade union. His primary role at the GPDA is to relay the paddock's concerns about safety, racing quality, and the junior driver pipeline to the GPDA's full-time personnel.

The GB4 Championship awards the George Russell Pole Position Cup to the driver who takes the most pole positions in a given season.

Like many Formula One drivers, Russell has participated in the Formula 1: Drive to Survive television show. The show's coverage of Russell has primarily focused on his efforts to join and stay at Mercedes. The fourth season (2022) traces his efforts to obtain the second Mercedes seat for 2022, when Valtteri Bottas's contract expired, and includes a scene in which Toto Wolff informs Russell of his promotion, which Motor Sport thought was staged for the cameras. The seventh season (2025) details Russell's efforts to earn a leadership role at Mercedes after Lewis Hamilton announced his departure for Ferrari, and suggested that Russell secured his place in Mercedes by winning the 2024 Belgian Grand Prix, when in reality, he was disqualified from that race. Russell was also a featured narrator in the episode about the 2024 Singapore Grand Prix. In 2024, Russell said that while he understands some "people are upset that everything is dramatized" in the show, he accepts the show's style as long as it draws new fans into the sport.

== Personal life ==
Since 2020, Russell has been in a relationship with Carmen Montero Mundt; the couple reside in Monaco. They were introduced to each other by mutual friends in London. The couple announced their engagement on 9 August 2026. He moved to Monaco in 2022.

Within Formula One, Russell is friends with Alex Albon, as well as Lando Norris and Charles Leclerc, with whom he and Albon streamed racing games on Twitch during the COVID-19 pandemic. Russell said that Albon helped him get into a top karting team, and Albon said that Russell campaigned for Williams to give him Russell's open seat after Russell left for Mercedes. He is also friends with Fernando Alonso, who has called him a "future world champ".

Apart from Formula One, Russell enjoys padel and free-diving. He is a fan of Wolverhampton Wanderers Football Club, where his father is a season-ticket holder. He was a special guest at Molineux in 2021.

Russell is vocal about mental health issues. He works with a psychologist and claims that it helps him perform better on track.

== Karting record ==
=== Karting career summary ===
Season	Series	Team	Position
2006	Kartmasters British Grand Prix — WTP Cadet		6th
2007	Kartmasters British Grand Prix — WTP Cadet		4th
2008	Kartmasters British Grand Prix — WTP Cadet		1st
2008	Kartmasters British Grand Prix — Comer Cadet		4th
2008	BRDC Stars of Tomorrow — Cadet		16th
2008	Manchester & Buxton Kart Club — Cadet		8th
2008	Super 1 National Championships — Comer Cadet		20th
2009	British Open Championship — Comer Cadet		1st
2009	WSK North American Series — Cadet	Team Top Kart USA	DNF
2009	Formula Kart Stars — Cadet		1st
2009	Super 1 National Championships — Comer Cadet		2nd
2009	Kartmasters British Grand Prix — Comer Cadet		1st
2010	Formula Kart Stars — Mini Max	Strawberry Racing	1st
2010	Kartmasters British Grand Prix — Mini Max	Strawberry Racing	1st
2010	Super 1 National Championships — Mini Max		1st
2011	South Garda Winter Cup — KF3	Intrepid Driver Program	10th
2011	Trent Valley Kart Club — Junior Max		43rd
2011	Super 1 National Championships — KF3		7th
2011	Kartmasters British Grand Prix — KF3		17th
2011	WSK Master Series — KF3	Intrepid Driver Program	43rd
2011	CIK-FIA European Championship — KF3	Intrepid Driver Program	1st
2011	WSK Euro Series — KF3	Intrepid Driver Program	7th
2011	CIK-FIA World Cup — KF3	Intrepid Driver Program	16th
2011	WSK Final Cup — KF3	Intrepid Driver Program	4th
2011	SKUSA SuperNationals — TaG Junior	Intrepid North America	1st
2011	Masters of Paris-Bercy — Junior		5th
2012	South Garda Winter Cup — KF3	Intrepid Driver Program	1st
2012	Andrea Margutti Trophy — KF3		7th
2012	Super 1 National Championships — KF3		2nd
2012	WSK Master Series — KF3	Forza Racing	3rd
2012	CIK-FIA European Championship — KF3	Intrepid Driver Program	1st
2012	WSK Euro Series — KF3	Intrepid Driver Program	4th
2012	CIK-FIA World Cup — KF3	Forza Racing	29th
2012	CIK-FIA Academy Trophy	Stephen Russell	10th
2012	SKUSA SuperNationals — TaG Junior	Forza Racing	2nd
2013	South Garda Winter Cup — KF2		9th
2013	WSK Super Master Series — KF	Birel Motorsport	15th
2013	WSK Euro Series — KF	Birel Motorsport	5th
2013	CIK-FIA European Championship — KF	Birel Motorsport	12th
2013	CIK-FIA World Championship — KF	Millennium Motorsport	19th

=== Complete CIK-FIA Karting European Championship results ===
(key) (Races in bold indicate pole position) (Races in italics indicate fastest lap)

Year	Team	Class	1	2	3	4	5	6	DC	Points
2011	Intrepid	KF3	ZUE; QH; 6	ZUE; PF; 2	ZUE; F 1				1st	-
2012	Intrepid	KF3	VAR; QH; 6	VAR; R1; 1	**VAR**; **R2**; 26	PFI; QH; 7	PFI; R1; 1	**PFI**; **R2**; 1	1st	75
2013	Birel	KF	ALC; QH; 20	ALC; PF; 8	ALC; F 8	ORT; QH; 23	ORT; PF; 12	ORT; F 18	12th	8

== Racing record ==
=== Racing career summary ===
Season	Series	Team	Races	Wins	Poles	F/Laps	Podiums	Points	Position
2014	BRDC Formula 4 Championship	Lanan Racing	24	5	3	4	11	483	**1st**
2014	Formula Renault 2.0 Alps	Koiranen GP	12	0	0	0	1	123	4th
2014	Eurocup Formula Renault 2.0	Koiranen GP	2	0	0	0	0	—	NC†
2014	Eurocup Formula Renault 2.0	Tech 1 Racing	2	1	1	1	1	—	NC†
2015	FIA Formula 3 European Championship	Carlin	33	1	0	0	3	203	6th
2015	Masters of Formula 3	Carlin	1	0	0	0	1	—N/a	**2nd**
2016	FIA Formula 3 European Championship	HitechGP	30	2	3	3	10	264	**3rd**
2016	Macau Grand Prix	HitechGP	1	0	1	0	0	—N/a	7th
2017	GP3 Series	ART Grand Prix	15	4	4	5	7	220	**1st**
2017	Formula One	Mercedes-AMG Petronas F1 Team	Test driver						
2017	Formula One	Sahara Force India F1 Team	Test driver						
2018	FIA Formula 2 Championship	ART Grand Prix	24	7	5	6	11	287	**1st**
2018	Formula One	Mercedes-AMG Petronas F1 Team	Reserve driver						
2018	Formula One	Sahara Force India F1 Team	Test driver						
2019	Formula One	ROKiT Williams Racing	21	0	0	0	0	0	20th
2020	Formula One	Williams Racing	16	0	0	0	0	3	18th
2020	Formula One	Mercedes-AMG Petronas F1 Team	1	0	0	1	0	3	18th
2021	Formula One	Williams Racing	22	0	0	0	1	16	15th
2022	Formula One	Mercedes-AMG Petronas F1 Team	22	1	1	4	8	275	4th
2023	Formula One	Mercedes-AMG Petronas F1 Team	22	0	0	1	2	175	8th
2024	Formula One	Mercedes-AMG Petronas F1 Team	24	2	4	2	4	245	6th
2025	Formula One	Mercedes-AMG Petronas F1 Team	24	2	2	3	9	319	4th
2026	Formula One	Mercedes-AMG Petronas F1 Team	21	3	5	2	8	264*	4th*

^{†} As Russell was a guest driver, he was ineligible for championship points.
* Season still in progress.

=== Complete BRDC Formula 4 Championship results ===
(key) (Races in bold indicate pole position) (Races in italics indicate points for the fastest lap of top ten finishers)

Year	Entrant	1	2	3	4	5	6	7	8	9	10	11	12	13	14	15	16	17	18	19	20	21	22	23	24	DC	Points
2014	Lanan Racing	SIL1; 1; 5	SIL1; 2; 1	SIL1; 3; 1	BRH1; 1; 4	BRH1; 2; 3	BRH1; 3; 1	**SNE1**; **1**; 3	SNE1; 2; 3	SNE1; 3; 6	**OUL**; **1**; 1	OUL; 2; 6	OUL; 3 Ret	SIL2; 1; 5	SIL2; 2; 6	SIL2; 3; 6	BRH2; 1; 10	BRH2; 2; 3	BRH2; 3; 5	DON; 1; 2	DON; 2; 6	DON; 3 Ret	**SNE2**; **1**; 7	SNE2; 2; 2	SNE2; 3; 1	1st	483

=== Complete Formula Renault 2.0 Alps Series results ===
(key) (Races in bold indicate pole position) (Races in italics indicate fastest lap)

Year	Entrant	1	2	3	4	5	6	7	8	9	10	11	12	13	14	Pos	Points
2014	Koiranen GP	IMO; 1; 6	IMO; 2; 9	PAU; 1; 4	PAU; 2 Ret	RBR; 1; 2	RBR; 2; 5	SPA; 1; 8	SPA; 2; 7	MNZ; 1 WD	MNZ; 2 WD	MUG; 1; 5	MUG; 2; 7	JER; 1; 13	JER; 2; 8	4th	123

=== Complete Eurocup Formula Renault 2.0 results ===
(key) (Races in bold indicate pole position; races in italics indicate fastest lap)

Year	Entrant	1	2	3	4	5	6	7	8	9	10	11	12	13	14	DC	Points
2014	Koiranen GP	ALC; 1	ALC; 2	SPA; 1	SPA; 2	MSC; 1; 15	MSC; 2; 22	NÜR; 1	NÜR; 2	HUN; 1	HUN; 2	LEC; 1	LEC; 2			NC†	—
2014	Tech 1 Racing													JER; 1; 5	**JER**; **2**; 1	NC†	—

† As Russell was a guest driver, he was ineligible for points

=== Complete FIA Formula 3 European Championship results ===
(key) (Races in bold indicate pole position) (Races in italics indicate fastest lap)

Year	Entrant	Engine	1	2	3	4	5	6	7	8	9	10	11	12	13	14	15	16	17	18	19	20	21	22	23	24	25	26	27	28	29	30	31	32	33	DC	Points
2015	Carlin	Volkswagen	SIL; 1; 8	SIL; 2; 1	SIL; 3; 5	HOC; 1; 11	HOC; 2; 9	HOC; 3; 18	PAU; 1; 8	PAU; 2; 6	PAU; 3; 8	MNZ; 1; 8	MNZ; 2; 6	MNZ; 3; 7	SPA; 1; 6	SPA; 2; 13	SPA; 3; 3	NOR; 1; 10	NOR; 2; 5	NOR; 3; 2	ZAN; 1; 6	ZAN; 2; 5	ZAN; 3; 6	RBR; 1; 5	RBR; 2; 7	RBR; 3; 9	ALG; 1; 10	ALG; 2; 5	ALG; 3; 4	NÜR; 1; 13	NÜR; 2; 8	NÜR; 3; 10	HOC; 1; 7	HOC; 2; 8	HOC; 3 Ret	6th	203
2016	Hitech GP	Mercedes	LEC; 1; 3	LEC; 2; 11	LEC; 3; 18	HUN; 1 Ret	HUN; 2; 4	HUN; 3 Ret	PAU; 1; 4	**PAU**; **2**; 1	PAU; 3; 3	RBR; 1; 5	RBR; 2; 2	RBR; 3 Ret	NOR; 1; 3	NOR; 2; 9	NOR; 3 Ret	ZAN; 1; 7	ZAN; 2; 9	ZAN; 3; 5	SPA; 1; 5	**SPA**; **2**; 1	**SPA**; **3**; 3	NÜR; 1; 3	NÜR; 2 Ret	NÜR; 3; 7	IMO; 1; 4	IMO; 2; 3	IMO; 3; 2	HOC; 1; 7	HOC; 2; 6	HOC; 3 Ret				3rd	264

=== Complete Macau Grand Prix results ===
Year	Team	Car	Qualifying	Quali Race	Main race
2016	(United Kingdom) HitechGP	Dallara F312	**1st**	5th	7th

=== Complete GP3 Series results ===
(key) (Races in bold indicate pole position) (Races in italics indicate fastest lap)

Year	Entrant	1	2	3	4	5	6	7	8	9	10	11	12	13	14	15	16	Pos	Points
2017	ART Grand Prix	CAT; FEA; 4	CAT; SPR; 5	**RBR**; **FEA**; 1	RBR; SPR; 6	**SIL**; **FEA**; 1	SIL; SPR; 4	HUN; FEA; DNS	HUN; SPR; 11	**SPA**; **FEA**; 1	SPA; SPR; 2	MNZ; FEA; 1	MNZ; SPR; C	JER; FEA; 2	JER; SPR; 4	**YMC**; **FEA**; 2	YMC; SPR; 4	1st	220

=== Complete FIA Formula 2 Championship results ===
(key) (Races in bold indicate pole position) (Races in italics indicate points for the fastest lap of top ten finishers)

Year	Entrant	1	2	3	4	5	6	7	8	9	10	11	12	13	14	15	16	17	18	19	20	21	22	23	24	DC	Points
2018	ART Grand Prix	BHR; FEA; 5	BHR; SPR; 19	BAK; FEA; 12	BAK; SPR; 1	CAT; FEA; 1	CAT; SPR; 4	MON; FEA; Ret	MON; SPR; Ret	**LEC**; **FEA**; 1	LEC; SPR; 17	**RBR**; **FEA**; 1	RBR; SPR; 2	**SIL**; **FEA**; 2	SIL; SPR; 2	HUN; FEA; Ret	HUN; SPR; 8	SPA; FEA; 3	SPA; SPR; 7	**MNZ**; **FEA**; 4	MNZ; SPR; 1	SOC; FEA; 4	SOC; SPR; 1	**YMC**; **FEA**; 1	YMC; SPR; 4	1st	287

=== Complete Formula One results ===
(key) (Races in bold indicate pole position; races in italics indicate fastest lap)

Year	Entrant	Chassis	Engine	1	2	3	4	5	6	7	8	9	10	11	12	13	14	15	16	17	18	19	20	21	22	23	24	WDC	Points
2017	Sahara Force India F1 Team	Force India VJM10	Mercedes F1 M08 EQ Power+ 1.6 V6 t	AUS	CHN	BHR	RUS	ESP	MON	CAN	AZE	AUT	GBR	HUN	BEL	ITA	SIN	MAL	JPN	USA	MEX	BRA; TD	ABU; TD					–	–
2019	ROKiT Williams Racing	Williams FW42	Mercedes F1 M10 EQ Power+ 1.6 V6 t	AUS; 16	BHR; 15	CHN; 16	AZE; 15	ESP; 17	MON; 15	CAN; 16	FRA; 19	AUT; 18	GBR; 14	GER; 11	HUN; 16	BEL; 15	ITA; 14	SIN; Ret	RUS; Ret	JPN; 16	MEX; 16	USA; 17	BRA; 12	ABU; 17				20th	0
2020	Williams Racing	Williams FW43	Mercedes F1 M11 EQ Performance 1.6 V6 t	AUT; Ret	STY; 16	HUN; 18	GBR; 12	70A; 18	ESP; 17	BEL; Ret	ITA; 14	TUS; 11	RUS; 18	EIF; Ret	POR; 14	EMI; Ret	TUR; 16	BHR; 12		ABU; 15								18th	3
2020	Mercedes-AMG Petronas F1 Team	Mercedes AMG F1 W11	Mercedes F1 M11 EQ Performance 1.6 V6 t																SKH; 9									18th	3
2021	Williams Racing	Williams FW43B	Mercedes F1 M12 E Performance 1.6 V6 t	BHR; 14	EMI; Ret	POR; 16	ESP; 14	MON; 14	AZE; 17†	FRA; 12	STY; Ret	AUT; 11	GBR; 12	HUN; 8	BEL; 2‡	NED; 17†	ITA; 9	RUS; 10	TUR; 15	USA; 14	MXC; 16	SAP; 13	QAT; 17	SAU; Ret	ABU; Ret			15th	16
2022	Mercedes-AMG Petronas F1 Team	Mercedes-AMG F1 W13	Mercedes F1 M13 E Performance 1.6 V6 t	BHR; 4	SAU; 5	AUS; 3	EMI; 4	MIA; 5	ESP; 3	MON; 5	AZE; 3	CAN; 4	GBR; Ret	AUT; 4^{4}	FRA; 3	**HUN**; 3	BEL; 4	NED; 2	ITA; 3	SIN; 14	JPN; 8	USA; 5	MXC; 4	SAP; 1^{1}	ABU; 5			4th	275
2023	Mercedes-AMG Petronas F1 Team	Mercedes-AMG F1 W14	Mercedes-AMG M14 E Performance 1.6 V6 t	BHR; 7	SAU; 4	AUS; Ret	AZE; 8^{4}	MIA; 4	MON; 5	ESP; 3	CAN; Ret	AUT; 7^{8}	GBR; 5	HUN; 6	BEL; 6^{8}	NED; 17	ITA; 5	SIN; 16†	JPN; 7	QAT; 4^{4}	USA; 5^{8}	MXC; 6	SAP; Ret^{4}	LVG; 8	ABU; 3			8th	175
2024	Mercedes-AMG Petronas F1 Team	Mercedes-AMG F1 W15	Mercedes-AMG M15 E Performance 1.6 V6 t	BHR; 5	SAU; 6	AUS; 17†	JPN; 7	CHN; 6^{8}	MIA; 8	EMI; 7	MON; 5	**CAN**; 3	ESP; 4	AUT; 1^{4}	**GBR**; Ret	HUN; 8	BEL; DSQ	NED; 7	ITA; 7	AZE; 3	SIN; 4	USA; 6^{5}	MXC; 5	SAP; 4^{6}	**LVG**; 1	**QAT**; 4^{3}	ABU; 5	6th	245
2025	Mercedes-AMG Petronas F1 Team	Mercedes-AMG F1 W16	Mercedes-AMG M16 E Performance 1.6 V6 t	AUS; 3	CHN; 3^{4}	JPN; 5	BHR; 2	SAU; 5	MIA; 3^{4}	EMI; 7	MON; 11	ESP; 4	**CAN**; 1	AUT; 5	GBR; 10	BEL; 5	HUN; 3	NED; 4	ITA; 5	AZE; 2	**SIN**; 1	USA; 6^{2}	MXC; 7	SAP; 4^{3}	LVG; 2	QAT; 6^{2}	ABU; 5	4th	319
2026	Mercedes-AMG Petronas F1 Team	Mercedes-AMG F1 W17	Mercedes-AMG M17 E Performance 1.6 V6 t	**AUS**; 1	CHN; 2^{1}	JPN; 4	MIA; 4^{4}	**CAN**; Ret^{1}	MON; 12	**BCN**; 2	**AUT**; 1	GBR; 2^{4}	BEL; Ret	HUN; 7	NED; 3^{1}	ITA; 2	ESP; 5	**AZE**; 1	BHR; 20†	SIN; 9	USA; 8	MXC; 6	SAP; 4	LVG; 9	QAT	ABU		4th*	264*

^{‡} Half points awarded as less than 75% of race distance was completed.
^{†} Did not finish but was classified, as he completed more than 90% of the race distance.
* Season still in progress.

== Notes ==
Sporting positions
Preceded by Jake Hughes	BRDC Formula 4 Championship; Champion; 2014	Succeeded by Will Palmer
Preceded by Charles Leclerc	GP3 Series; Champion; 2017	Succeeded by Anthoine Hubert
Preceded by Charles Leclerc	FIA Formula 2 Championship; Champion; 2018	Succeeded by Nyck de Vries
Awards
Preceded by Matt Parry	McLaren Autosport BRDC Award; 2014	Succeeded by Will Palmer
Preceded by Lewis Hamilton	Hawthorn Memorial Trophy; 2022	Succeeded by Lewis Hamilton
Preceded by Lando Norris	Lorenzo Bandini Trophy; 2024	Succeeded by Oscar Piastri
