= 2018 Spa-Francorchamps Formula 2 round =

(Belgium) 2018 Spa-Francorchamps Formula 2 round
Round details
- Round 9 of 12 in the 2018 FIA Formula 2 Championship.
- Layout of the Circuit de Spa-Francorchamps
- Location: Circuit de Spa-Francorchamps, Stavelot, Belgium
- Course: Permanent racing facility 7.004 km (4.352 mi)

Feature race
- Date: 25 August 2018
- Laps: 25
Pole position
Driver	(Netherlands) Nyck de Vries	Pertamina Prema Theodore Racing
Time	1:56.054	
Podium
First	(Netherlands) Nyck de Vries	Pertamina Prema Theodore Racing
Second	(Brazil) Sérgio Sette Câmara	Carlin
Third	(United Kingdom) George Russell	ART Grand Prix
Fastest lap
Driver	(Netherlands) Nyck de Vries	Pertamina Prema Theodore Racing
- Time: 2:00.632 (on lap 19)

Sprint race
- Date: 26 August 2018
- Laps: 18
Podium
First	(Canada) Nicholas Latifi	DAMS
Second	(United Kingdom) Lando Norris	Carlin
Third	(Thailand) Alexander Albon	DAMS
Fastest lap
Driver	(Canada) Nicholas Latifi	DAMS
- Time: 2:01.484 (on lap 2)

The 2018 Spa-Francorchamps FIA Formula 2 round was a pair of motor races held on 25 and 26 August 2018 at the Circuit de Spa-Francorchamps in Stavelot, Belgium as part of the FIA Formula 2 Championship. It was the ninth round of the 2018 FIA Formula 2 Championship and was run in support of the 2018 Belgian Grand Prix.

== Classification ==
=== Qualifying ===
Pos.	No.	Driver	Team	Time	Gap	Grid
1	4	(Netherlands) Nyck de Vries	Pertamina Prema Theodore Racing	1:56.054	–	1
2	8	(United Kingdom) George Russell	ART Grand Prix	1:56.457	+0.403	2
3	18	(Brazil) Sérgio Sette Câmara	Carlin	1:56.594	+0.540	3
4	14	(Italy) Luca Ghiotto	Campos Vexatec Racing	1:56.611	+0.557	4
5	19	(United Kingdom) Lando Norris	Carlin	1:56.723	+0.669	5
6	5	(Thailand) Alexander Albon	DAMS	1:56.878	+0.824	6
7	21	(Italy) Antonio Fuoco	Charouz Racing System	1:56.930	+0.876	10^{1}
8	12	(Japan) Nirei Fukuzumi	BWT Arden	1:57.169	+1.115	7
9	20	(Switzerland) Louis Delétraz	Charouz Racing System	1:57.183	+1.129	8
10	1	(Russia) Artem Markelov	Russian Time	1:57.266	+1.212	9
11	2	(Japan) Tadasuke Makino	Russian Time	1:57.394	+1.340	11
12	6	(Canada) Nicholas Latifi	DAMS	1:57.515	+1.461	12
13	10	(Switzerland) Ralph Boschung	MP Motorsport	1:57.596	+1.542	13
14	11	(Germany) Maximilian Günther	BWT Arden	1:57.635	+1.581	14
15	16	(India) Arjun Maini	Trident	1:57.718	+1.664	15
16	7	(United Kingdom) Jack Aitken	ART Grand Prix	1:57.754	+1.700	16
17	15	(Israel) Roy Nissany	Campos Vexatec Racing	1:57.773	+1.719	17
18	3	(Indonesia) Sean Gelael	Pertamina Prema Theodore Racing	1:57.878	+1.824	18
19	17	(Italy) Alessio Lorandi	Trident	1:58.174	+2.120	19
20	9	(France) Dorian Boccolacci	MP Motorsport	1:58.338	+2.284	20

Notes

- ^1– Antonio Fuoco was handed a 3-place grid penalty for failing to serve a time penalty during his pit stop in the Hungary Sprint Race.

=== Feature race ===
Pos.	No.	Driver	Team	Laps	Time/Retired	Grid	Points
1	4	(Netherlands) Nyck de Vries	Pertamina Prema Theodore Racing	25	56:02.281	1	25 (6)
2	18	(Brazil) Sérgio Sette Câmara	Carlin	25	+3.153	3	18
3	8	(United Kingdom) George Russell	ART Grand Prix	25	+7.572	2	15
4	19	(United Kingdom) Lando Norris	Carlin	25	+8.906	5	12
5	5	(Thailand) Alexander Albon	DAMS	25	+9.408	6	10
6	1	(Russia) Artem Markelov	Russian Time	25	+13.181	9	8
7	14	(Italy) Luca Ghiotto	Campos Vexatec Racing	25	+13.211	4	6
8	6	(Canada) Nicholas Latifi	DAMS	25	+14.674	12	4
9	11	(Germany) Maximilian Günther	BWT Arden	25	+15.915	14	2
10	15	(Israel) Roy Nissany	Campos Vexatec Racing	25	+22.354	17	1
11	7	(United Kingdom) Jack Aitken	ART Grand Prix	25	+23.917	16	
12	2	(Japan) Tadasuke Makino	Russian Time	25	+24.477	11	
13	17	(Italy) Alessio Lorandi	Trident	25	+26.417	19	
14	16	(India) Arjun Maini	Trident	25	+28.920	15	
15	9	(France) Dorian Boccolacci	MP Motorsport	25	+29.612	20	
16	3	(Indonesia) Sean Gelael	Pertamina Prema Theodore Racing	25	+32.482	18	
17	21	(Italy) Antonio Fuoco	Charouz Racing System	25	+32.706	10	
18	20	(Switzerland) Louis Delétraz	Charouz Racing System	25	+34.112	8	
DNF	10	(Switzerland) Ralph Boschung	MP Motorsport	18	Spin	13	
DNF	12	(Japan) Nirei Fukuzumi	BWT Arden	13	Fire	7	
Fastest lap: Nyck de Vries (Pertamina Prema Theodore Racing) 2:00.632 (on lap 19)

=== Sprint race ===
Pos.	No.	Driver	Team	Laps	Time/Retired	Grid	Points
1	6	(Canada) Nicholas Latifi	DAMS	18	37:13.659	1	15 (2)
2	19	(United Kingdom) Lando Norris	Carlin	18	+10.402	5	12
3	5	(Thailand) Alexander Albon	DAMS	18	+10.766	4	10
4	4	(Netherlands) Nyck de Vries	Pertamina Prema Theodore Racing	18	+13.210	8	8
5	1	(Russia) Artem Markelov	Russian Time	18	+13.448	3	6
6	14	(Italy) Luca Ghiotto	Campos Vexatec Racing	18	+22.179	2	4
7	8	(United Kingdom) George Russell	ART Grand Prix	18	+23.357	6	2
8	16	(India) Arjun Maini	Trident	18	+31.864	14	1
9	18	(Brazil) Sérgio Sette Câmara	Carlin	18	+33.578	7	
10	7	(United Kingdom) Jack Aitken	ART Grand Prix	18	+34.567	11	
11	2	(Japan) Tadasuke Makino	Russian Time	18	+40.032	12	
12	10	(Switzerland) Ralph Boschung	MP Motorsport	18	+40.100	20	
13	20	(Switzerland) Louis Delétraz	Charouz Racing System	18	+42.899	18	
14	15	(Israel) Roy Nissany	Campos Vexatec Racing	18	+44.631	10	
15	17	(Italy) Alessio Lorandi	Trident	18	+52.568	13	
16	11	(Germany) Maximilian Günther	BWT Arden	18	+55.305	9	
17	12	(Japan) Nirei Fukuzumi	BWT Arden	18	+59.007	19	
18	9	(France) Dorian Boccolacci	MP Motorsport	18	+1:00.115	15	
19	21	(Italy) Antonio Fuoco	Charouz Racing System	18	+1:06.936	17	
DNF	3	(Indonesia) Sean Gelael	Pertamina Prema Theodore Racing	2	Mechanical	16	
Fastest lap: Nicholas Latifi (DAMS) 2:01.884 (on lap 2)

== Championship standings after the round ==
Drivers' Championship standings

	Pos.	Driver	Points
	1	(United Kingdom) George Russell	188
	2	(United Kingdom) Lando Norris	183
	3	(Thailand) Alexander Albon	161
1	4	(Netherlands) Nyck de Vries	153
1	5	(Russia) Artem Markelov	128

Teams' Championship standings

	Pos.	Team	Points
	1	(United Kingdom) Carlin	307
	2	(France) ART Grand Prix	249
	3	(France) DAMS	216
1	4	(Italy) Pertamina Prema Theodore Racing	182
1	5	(Czech Republic) Charouz Racing System	174

== See also ==
- 2018 Belgian Grand Prix
- 2018 Spa-Francorchamps GP3 Series round

Previous round: 2018 Budapest Formula 2 round	FIA Formula 2 Championship; 2018 season	Next round: 2018 Monza Formula 2 round
Previous round: 2017 Spa-Francorchamps Formula 2 round	Spa-Francorchamps Formula 2 round	Next round: 2019 Spa-Francorchamps Formula 2 round
