= 2017 Spielberg Formula 2 round =

(Austria) 2017 Red Bull Ring Formula 2 round
Round details
- Round 5 of 11 in the 2017 FIA Formula 2 Championship.
- Layout of the Red Bull Ring
- Location: Red Bull Ring, Spielberg, Styria, Austria
- Course: Permanent racing facility 4.318 km (2.683 mi)

Feature race
- Date: 8 July 2017
- Laps: 40
Pole position
| Driver | (Monaco) Charles Leclerc | Prema Racing |
| Time | 1:13.396 | |
Podium
| First | (Monaco) Charles Leclerc | Prema Racing |
| Second | (Canada) Nicholas Latifi | DAMS |
| Third | (Italy) Antonio Fuoco | Prema Racing |
Fastest lap
| Driver | (Japan) Nobuharu Matsushita | ART Grand Prix |
- Time: 1:15.854 (on lap 34)

Sprint race
- Date: 9 July 2017
- Laps: 28
Podium
| First | (Russia) Artem Markelov | Russian Time |
| Second | (Thailand) Alexander Albon | ART Grand Prix |
| Third | (United Kingdom) Oliver Rowland | DAMS |
Fastest lap
| Driver | (Russia) Artem Markelov | Russian Time |
- Time: 1:16.119 (on lap 21)

The 2017 Red Bull Ring FIA Formula 2 round was a pair of motor races held on 8 and 9 July 2017 at the Red Bull Ring in Spielberg, Styria, Austria as part of the FIA Formula 2 Championship. It was the fifth round of the 2017 FIA Formula 2 Championship and was run in support of the 2017 Austrian Grand Prix.

== Classifications ==
=== Qualifying ===
| Pos. | No. | Driver | Team | Time | Gap | Grid |
|---|---|---|---|---|---|---|
| 1 | 1 | (Monaco) Charles Leclerc | Prema Racing | 1:13.396 | — | 1 |
| DSQ | 14 | (Brazil) Sérgio Sette Câmara | MP Motorsport | 1:13.736 | +0.340 | 20 |
| 2 | 2 | (Italy) Antonio Fuoco | Prema Racing | 1:13.776 | +0.380 | 2 |
| 3 | 8 | (Thailand) Alexander Albon | ART Grand Prix | 1:13.888 | +0.492 | 3 |
| 4 | 9 | (United Kingdom) Oliver Rowland | DAMS | 1:13.903 | +0.507 | 4 |
| 5 | 7 | (Japan) Nobuharu Matsushita | ART Grand Prix | 1:13.922 | +0.526 | 5 |
| 6 | 18 | (Netherlands) Nyck de Vries | Rapax | 1:14.034 | +0.638 | 6 |
| 7 | 5 | (Italy) Luca Ghiotto | Russian Time | 1:14.180 | +0.784 | 7 |
| 8 | 10 | (Canada) Nicholas Latifi | DAMS | 1:14.193 | +0.797 | 8 |
| 9 | 20 | (France) Norman Nato | Arden International | 1:14.203 | +0.807 | 9 |
| 10 | 11 | (Switzerland) Ralph Boschung | Campos Racing | 1:14.363 | +0.967 | 10 |
| 11 | 3 | (Switzerland) Louis Delétraz | Racing Engineering | 1:14.377 | +0.981 | 11 |
| 12 | 15 | (United Kingdom) Jordan King | MP Motorsport | 1:14.384 | +0.988 | 12 |
| 13 | 19 | (Spain) Sergio Canamasas | Rapax | 1:14.489 | +1.093 | 13 |
| 14 | 6 | (Russia) Artem Markelov | Russian Time | 1:14.534 | +1.138 | 14 |
| 15 | 21 | (Indonesia) Sean Gelael | Arden International | 1:14.555 | +1.159 | 15 |
| 16 | 17 | (Italy) Raffaele Marciello | Trident | 1:14.643 | +1.247 | 16 |
| 17 | 12 | (Romania) Robert Vișoiu | Campos Racing | 1:14.653 | +1.257 | 17 |
| 18 | 16 | (Malaysia) Nabil Jeffri | Trident | 1:14.672 | +1.276 | 18 |
| 19 | 4 | (Sweden) Gustav Malja | Racing Engineering | 1:15.121 | +1.725 | 19 |

=== Feature Race ===
| Pos. | No. | Driver | Team | Laps | Time / Gap | Grid | Points |
|---|---|---|---|---|---|---|---|
| 1 | 1 | (Monaco) Charles Leclerc | Prema Racing | 40 | 52:21.629 | 1 | 25 (4) |
| 2 | 10 | (Canada) Nicholas Latifi | DAMS | 40 | +1.345 | 8 | 18 |
| 3 | 2 | (Italy) Antonio Fuoco | Prema Racing | 40 | +5.160 | 2 | 15 |
| 4 | 9 | (United Kingdom) Oliver Rowland | DAMS | 40 | +5.682 | 4 | 12 |
| 5 | 8 | (Thailand) Alexander Albon | ART Grand Prix | 40 | +9.846 | 3 | 10 |
| 6 | 7 | (Japan) Nobuharu Matsushita | ART Grand Prix | 40 | +12.179 | 5 | 8 (2) |
| 7 | 11 | (Switzerland) Ralph Boschung | Campos Racing | 40 | +19.400 | 10 | 6 |
| 8 | 6 | (Russia) Artem Markelov | Russian Time | 40 | +20.385 | 14 | 4 |
| 9 | 15 | (United Kingdom) Jordan King | MP Motorsport | 40 | +30.481 | 12 | 2 |
| 10 | 21 | (Indonesia) Sean Gelael | Arden International | 40 | +33.662 | 15 | 1 |
| 11 | 12 | (Romania) Robert Vișoiu | Campos Racing | 40 | +35.636 | 17 | |
| 12 | 4 | (Sweden) Gustav Malja | Racing Engineering | 40 | +36.011 | 19 | |
| 13 | 18 | (Netherlands) Nyck de Vries | Rapax | 40 | +44.145 | 6 | |
| 14 | 5 | (Italy) Luca Ghiotto | Russian Time | 40 | +46.896 | 7 | |
| 15 | 19 | (Spain) Sergio Canamasas | Rapax | 40 | +48.883 | 13 | |
| 16 | 14 | (Brazil) Sérgio Sette Câmara | MP Motorsport | 40 | +50.940 | 20 | |
| 17 | 3 | (Switzerland) Louis Delétraz | Racing Engineering | 40 | +53.423 | 11 | |
| 18 | 16 | (Malaysia) Nabil Jeffri | Trident | 40 | +56.881 | 18 | |
| 19 | 17 | (Italy) Raffaele Marciello | Trident | 39 | +1 lap | 16 | |
| DNF | 20 | (France) Norman Nato | Arden International | 5 | Suspension | 9 | |
Fastest lap: (Japan) Nobuharu Matsushita (ART Grand Prix) – 1:15.854 (on lap 34)

=== Sprint Race ===
| Pos. | No. | Driver | Team | Laps | Time / Gap | Grid | Points |
|---|---|---|---|---|---|---|---|
| 1 | 6 | (Russia) Artem Markelov | Russian Time | 28 | 40:32.190 | 1 | 15 (2) |
| 2 | 8 | (Thailand) Alexander Albon | ART Grand Prix | 28 | +1.458 | 4 | 12 |
| 3 | 9 | (United Kingdom) Oliver Rowland | DAMS | 28 | +2.055 | 5 | 10 |
| 4 | 5 | (Italy) Luca Ghiotto | Russian Time | 28 | +5.840 | 14 | 8 |
| 5 | 2 | (Italy) Antonio Fuoco | Prema Racing | 28 | +6.629 | 6 | 6 |
| 6 | 15 | (United Kingdom) Jordan King | MP Motorsport | 28 | +10.515 | 9 | 4 |
| 7 | 20 | (France) Norman Nato | Arden International | 28 | +13.656 | 20 | 2 |
| 8 | 10 | (Canada) Nicholas Latifi | DAMS | 28 | +15.922 | 7 | 1 |
| 9 | 19 | (Spain) Sergio Canamasas | Rapax | 28 | +15.979 | 15 | |
| 10 | 14 | (Brazil) Sérgio Sette Câmara | MP Motorsport | 28 | +16.282 | 16 | |
| 11 | 21 | (Indonesia) Sean Gelael | Arden International | 28 | +18.849 | 10 | |
| 12 | 16 | (Malaysia) Nabil Jeffri | Trident | 28 | +20.948 | 18 | |
| 13 | 3 | (Switzerland) Louis Delétraz | Racing Engineering | 28 | +21.301 | 17 | |
| 14 | 7 | (Japan) Nobuharu Matsushita | ART Grand Prix | 28 | +22.443 | 3 | |
| 15 | 4 | (Sweden) Gustav Malja | Racing Engineering | 28 | +1:07.922 | 12 | |
| 16 | 18 | (Netherlands) Nyck de Vries | Rapax | 26 | Collision damage | 13 | |
| 17 | 12 | (Romania) Robert Vișoiu | Campos Racing | 25 | Collision damage | 11 | |
| DNF | 11 | (Switzerland) Ralph Boschung | Campos Racing | 15 | Gearbox | 2 | |
| DNF | 1 | (Monaco) Charles Leclerc | Prema Racing | 4 | Spun off | 8 | |
| DNF | 17 | (Italy) Raffaele Marciello | Trident | 0 | Accident | 19 | |
Fastest lap: (Russia) Artem Markelov (Russian Time) – 1:16.119 (on lap 21)

| Despite Nyck De Vries and Robert Visoiu Not Finish the Race, they still Classified, Because they Complete 90% of the Race Distance

== Championship standings after the round ==
Drivers' Championship standings

| | Pos. | Driver | Points |
|---|---|---|---|
| | 1 | (Monaco) Charles Leclerc | 151 |
| | 2 | (United Kingdom) Oliver Rowland | 102 |
| | 3 | (Russia) Artem Markelov | 99 |
| 1 | 4 | (Canada) Nicholas Latifi | 72 |
| 1 | 5 | (Italy) Luca Ghiotto | 66 |

Teams' Championship standings

| | Pos. | Team | Points |
|---|---|---|---|
| 2 | 1 | (Italy) Prema Racing | 174 |
| | 2 | (France) DAMS | 174 |
| 2 | 3 | (Russia) Russian Time | 165 |
| | 4 | (France) ART Grand Prix | 130 |
| | 5 | (Italy) Rapax | 61 |

- Note: Only the top five positions are included for both sets of standings.

== See also ==
- 2017 Austrian Grand Prix
- 2017 Spielberg GP3 Series round

| Previous round: 2017 Baku Formula 2 round | FIA Formula 2 Championship; 2017 season | Next round: 2017 Silverstone Formula 2 round |
| Previous round: 2016 Red Bull Ring GP2 Series round | Red Bull Ring Formula 2 round | Next round: 2018 Spielberg Formula 2 round |
