= 2016 Silverstone GP2 Series round =

2016 GP2 race held in the United Kingdom

(United Kingdom) 2016 Silverstone GP2 round
Round details
- Round 5 of 11 rounds in the 2016 GP2 Series
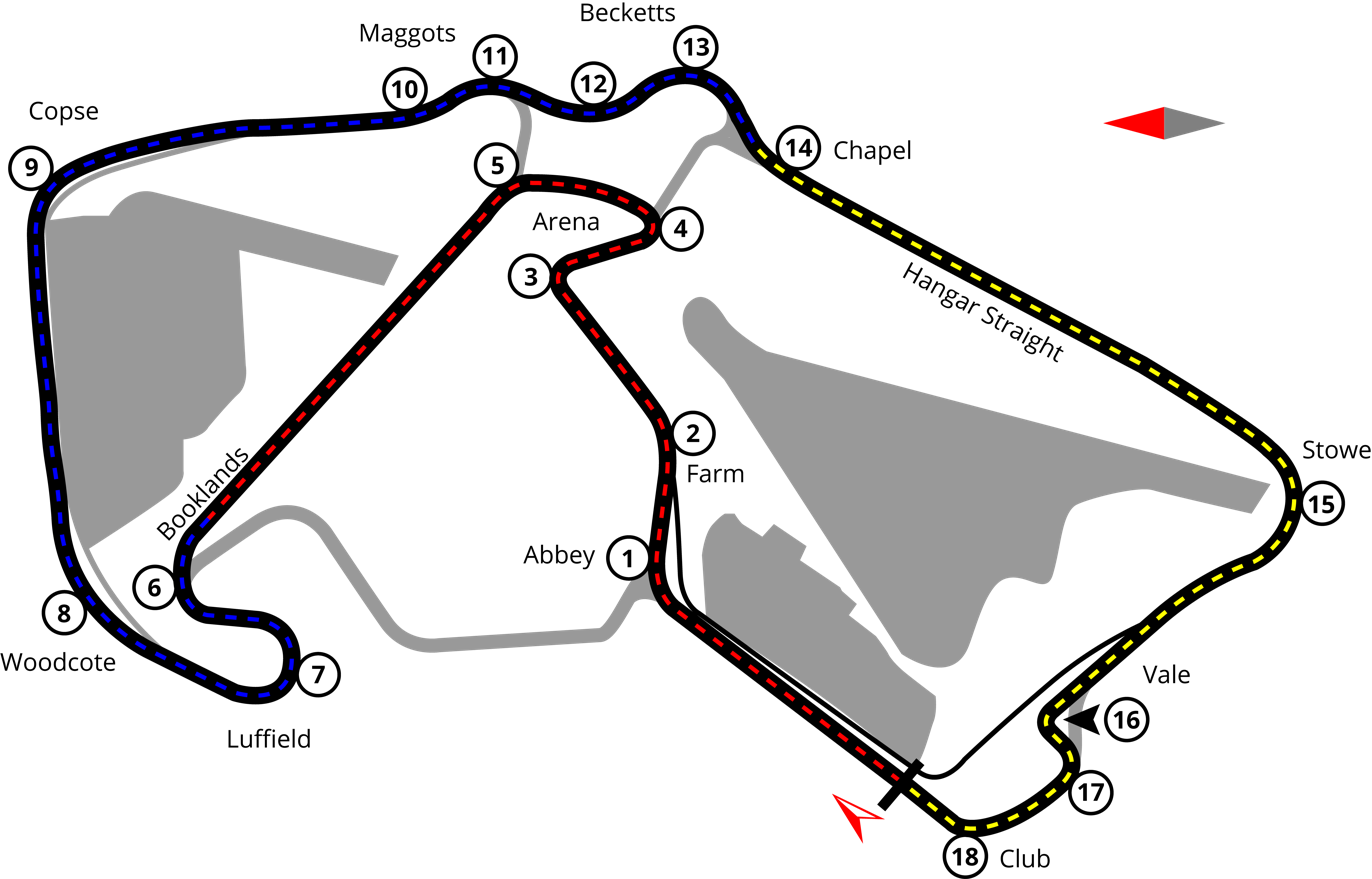
- Layout of the Silverstone Circuit
- Location: Silverstone Circuit; Silverstone, United Kingdom
- Course: Permanent racing facility 5.891 km (3.660 mi)

GP2 Series

Feature race
- Date: 9 July 2016
- Laps: 29

Pole position
Driver	(France) Norman Nato	Racing Engineering
- Time: 1:38.216

Podium
First	(France) Pierre Gasly	Prema Racing
Second	(Italy) Antonio Giovinazzi	Prema Racing
Third	(United Kingdom) Oliver Rowland	MP Motorsport

Fastest lap
Driver	(New Zealand) Mitch Evans	Campos Racing
- Time: 1:43.172 (on lap 24)

Sprint race
- Date: 10 July 2016
- Laps: 21

Podium
First	(United Kingdom) Jordan King	Racing Engineering
Second	(Italy) Luca Ghiotto	Trident
Third	(United Kingdom) Oliver Rowland	MP Motorsport

Fastest lap
Driver	(Italy) Luca Ghiotto	Trident
- Time: 1:44.199 (on lap 3)

The 2016 Silverstone GP2 Series round was a GP2 Series motor race held on 9 and 10 July 2016 at the Silverstone Circuit in the United Kingdom. It was the fifth round of the 2016 GP2 Series. The race weekend they supported the 2016 British Grand Prix.

== Background ==
ART Grand Prix's Nobuharu Matsushita returned to the series after serving his one-round ban in Austria.

== Report ==
=== Qualifying ===
In a somewhat controversial manner, Norman Nato achieved the fastest time of 1:38.216, thereby achieving his first pole position of the year. He was under investigation for setting his pole lap under red flag conditions. He was deemed by officials to set the lap time under green conditions and his pole time stood. Pierre Gasly achieved second place two-tenths behind Nato and Nicholas Latifi achieved a career-best of third.

Pos.	No.	Driver	Team	Time	Grid
1	3	(France) Norman Nato	Racing Engineering	1:38.216	1
2	21	(France) Pierre Gasly	Prema Racing	1:38.441	2
3	6	(Canada) Nicholas Latifi	DAMS	1:38.797	3
4	9	(Italy) Raffaele Marciello	Russian Time	1:38.842	4
5	2	(Russia) Sergey Sirotkin	ART Grand Prix	1:38.904	PL ^{1}
6	20	(Italy) Antonio Giovinazzi	Prema Racing	1:38.912	5
7	7	(New Zealand) Mitch Evans	Campos Racing	1:39.084	6
8	4	(United Kingdom) Jordan King	Racing Engineering	1:39.123	7
9	12	(France) Arthur Pic	Rapax	1:39.160	8
10	22	(United Kingdom) Oliver Rowland	MP Motorsport	1:39.192	9
11	10	(Russia) Artem Markelov	Russian Time	1:39.370	10
12	1	(Japan) Nobuharu Matsushita	ART Grand Prix	1:39.572	11
13	19	(Germany) Marvin Kirchhöfer	Carlin	1:39.668	12
14	18	(Spain) Sergio Canamasas	Carlin	1:39.749	16 ^{2}
15	8	(Indonesia) Sean Gelael	Campos Racing	1:39.750	13
16	11	(Sweden) Gustav Malja	Rapax	1:39.798	14
17	5	(United Kingdom) Alex Lynn	DAMS	1:39.928	15
18	23	(Netherlands) Daniël de Jong	MP Motorsport	1:40.459	17
19	25	(Sweden) Jimmy Eriksson	Arden International	1:40.838	18
20	24	(Malaysia) Nabil Jeffri	Arden International	1:41.160	19
21	14	(Indonesia) Philo Paz Armand	Trident	1:41.385	20
–	15	(Italy) Luca Ghiotto	Trident	no time	21

Notes
1. – Sirotkin was penalised after he failed to stop at the weighbridge and the car was not brought back before the mechanics worked on it, thereby violating the parc ferme ruling. He started from the pitlane.
2. – Canamasas received a three-place grid penalty after having been deemed to demonstrate unsporting behaviour towards Oliver Rowland after the conclusion of practice.

=== Feature Race ===
The preferred tire strategy for the feature race was often to start on the hard compound and then switch to soft later in the race. Prema Racing went against this using the opposite strategy to great effect, with Pierre Gasly taking his maiden GP2 win from teammate Antonio Giovinazzi. Oliver Rowland also went with this strategy, achieving third despite struggling for grip in the dying laps. This result elevates both Prema drivers to first and second in the standings, with Evans maintaining third.

Pos.	No.	Driver	Team	Laps	Time/Retired	Grid	Points
1	21	(France) Pierre Gasly	Prema Racing	29	51:39.383	2	25
2	20	(Italy) Antonio Giovinazzi	Prema Racing	29	+9.422	5	18
3	22	(United Kingdom) Oliver Rowland	MP Motorsport	29	+16.090 ^{1}	9	15
4	7	(New Zealand) Mitch Evans	Campos Racing	29	+21.667	6	12 (2)
5	15	(Italy) Luca Ghiotto	Trident	29	+24.591	21	10
6	1	(Japan) Nobuharu Matsushita	ART Grand Prix	29	+25.165	11	8
7	3	(France) Norman Nato	Racing Engineering	29	+25.474	1	6 (4)
8	4	(United Kingdom) Jordan King	Racing Engineering	29	+25.651	7	4
9	9	(Italy) Raffaele Marciello	Russian Time	29	+31.757	4	2
10	10	(Russia) Artem Markelov	Russian Time	29	+33.115	10	1
11	6	(Canada) Nicholas Latifi	DAMS	29	+34.220	3	
12	19	(Germany) Marvin Kirchhöfer	Carlin	29	+34.409	12	
13	18	(Spain) Sergio Canamasas	Carlin	29	+37.898	16	
14	12	(France) Arthur Pic	Rapax	29	+42.610	8	
15	25	(Sweden) Jimmy Eriksson	Arden International	29	+55.205	18	
16	5	(United Kingdom) Alex Lynn	DAMS	29	+56.604	15	
17	24	(Malaysia) Nabil Jeffri	Arden International	29	+57.490	13	
18	2	(Russia) Sergey Sirotkin	ART Grand Prix	29	+1:02.096	PL	
19	23	(Netherlands) Daniël de Jong	MP Motorsport	29	+1:23.661	17	
20	14	(Indonesia) Philo Paz Armand	Trident	29	+1:39.764	20	
21	8	(Indonesia) Sean Gelael	Campos Racing	28	+1 Lap	13	
22	11	(Sweden) Gustav Malja	Rapax	28	+1 Lap	14	
Fastest lap: (New Zealand) Mitch Evans (Campos Racing) – 1:43.172 (on lap 24)

Notes
1. – Rowland was given a five-second time penalty for excessive over-use of track limits.

=== Sprint Race ===
The sprint race saw another dominant performance from Jordan King who led from start to finish despite a late charge from Luca Ghiotto. The race was rather calm for the most part until three-laps from the end when the rain started to descend upon the circuit. As the circuit became more and more slippery, the drivers soon found themselves struggling for grip. Norman Nato spun off and several others left the circuit. Rowland passed Matsushita in the final laps to achieve another podium, the only driver to do so throughout the weekend.

Pos.	No.	Driver	Team	Laps	Time/Retired	Grid	Points
1	4	(United Kingdom) Jordan King	Racing Engineering	21	37:35.325	1	15
2	15	(Italy) Luca Ghiotto	Trident	21	+0.580	4	12 (2)
3	22	(United Kingdom) Oliver Rowland	MP Motorsport	21	+11.664	6	10
4	20	(Italy) Antonio Giovinazzi	Prema Racing	21	+11.786	7	8
5	1	(Japan) Nobuharu Matsushita	ART Grand Prix	21	+17.518	3	6
6	9	(Italy) Raffaele Marciello	Russian Time	21	+20.467	9	4
7	21	(France) Pierre Gasly	Prema Racing	21	+23.126	8	2
8	19	(Germany) Marvin Kirchhöfer	Carlin	21	+25.873	12	1
9	18	(Spain) Sergio Canamasas	Carlin	21	+26.721	13	
10	6	(Canada) Nicholas Latifi	DAMS	21	+27.370	11	
11	12	(France) Arthur Pic	Rapax	21	+28.061	14	
12	10	(Russia) Artem Markelov	Russian Time	21	+28.632	10	
13	7	(New Zealand) Mitch Evans	Campos Racing	21	+28.844	5	
14	5	(United Kingdom) Alex Lynn	DAMS	21	+29.598	16	
15	24	(Malaysia) Nabil Jeffri	Arden International	21	+31.284	17	
16	23	(Netherlands) Daniël de Jong	MP Motorsport	21	+32.249	19	
17	25	(Sweden) Jimmy Eriksson	Arden International	21	+35.412	15	
18	8	(Indonesia) Sean Gelael	Campos Racing	21	+40.058	21	
19	11	(Sweden) Gustav Malja	Rapax	21	+46.964	22	
20	14	(Indonesia) Philo Paz Armand	Trident	21	+1:30.028	20	
21	2	(Russia) Sergey Sirotkin	ART Grand Prix	21	+1:30.624	18	
Ret	3	(France) Norman Nato	Racing Engineering	19	Spun off	2	
Fastest lap: (Italy) Luca Ghiotto (Trident) – 1:44.199 (on lap 3)

== Standings after the round ==
Drivers' Championship standings

	Pos	Driver	Points
4	1	(United Kingdom) Oliver Rowland	79
4	2	(Italy) Antonio Giovinazzi	78
5	3	(France) Pierre Gasly	74
3	4	(Italy) Raffaele Marciello	72
3	5	(New Zealand) Mitch Evans	70

Teams' Championship standings

	Pos	Team	Points
2	1	(Italy) Prema Racing	152
	2	(Spain) Racing Engineering	129
2	3	(Russia) Russian Time	127
	4	(Indonesia) Campos Racing	94
1	5	(France) ART Grand Prix	86

- Note: Only the top five positions are included for both sets of standings.

== See also ==
- 2016 British Grand Prix
- 2016 Silverstone GP3 Series round

Previous round: 2016 Red Bull Ring GP2 Series round	GP2 Series; 2016 season	Next round: 2016 Hungaroring GP2 Series round
Previous round: 2015 Silverstone GP2 Series round	Silverstone GP2 round	Next round: 2017 Silverstone Formula 2 round
