= 2018 Le Castellet Formula 2 round =

Motor racing event

(France) 2018 Paul Ricard Formula 2 round
Round details
- Round 5 of 12 in the 2018 FIA Formula 2 Championship.
- Layout of the Circuit Paul Ricard
- Location: Circuit Paul Ricard; Le Castellet, Provence-Alpes-Côte d'Azur, France
- Course: Permanent racing circuit 5.842 km (3.630 mi)

Feature race
- Date: 23 June 2018
- Laps: 30
Pole position
Driver	(United Kingdom) George Russell	ART Grand Prix
Time	1:44.469	
Podium
First	(United Kingdom) George Russell	ART Grand Prix
Second	(Brazil) Sérgio Sette Câmara	Carlin
Third	(Italy) Luca Ghiotto	Campos Vexatec Racing
Fastest lap
Driver	(Netherlands) Nyck de Vries	Pertamina Prema Theodore Racing
- Time: 1:47.085 (on lap 26)

Sprint race
- Date: 24 June 2018
- Laps: 21
Podium
First	(Netherlands) Nyck de Vries	Pertamina Prema Theodore Racing
Second	(Switzerland) Louis Delétraz	Charouz Racing System
Third	(Italy) Luca Ghiotto	Campos Vexatec Racing
Fastest lap
Driver	(Switzerland) Ralph Boschung	MP Motorsport
- Time: 1:47.827 (on lap 15)

The 2018 Paul Ricard FIA Formula 2 round was a pair of motor races for Formula 2 cars that took place on 23 and 24 June 2018 at the Circuit Paul Ricard in Le Castellet, Provence-Alpes-Côte d'Azur, France as part of the FIA Formula 2 Championship. It was the fifth round of the 2018 FIA Formula 2 Championship and ran in support of the 2018 French Grand Prix.

== Classification ==
=== Qualifying ===
Pos.	No.	Driver	Team	Time	Gap	Grid
1	8	(United Kingdom) George Russell	ART Grand Prix	1:44.469	–	1
2	5	(Thailand) Alexander Albon	DAMS	1:44.635	+0.166	2
3	19	(United Kingdom) Lando Norris	Carlin	1:44.781	+0.312	3
4	18	(Brazil) Sérgio Sette Câmara	Carlin	1:45.092	+0.623	4
5	14	(Italy) Luca Ghiotto	Campos Vexatec Racing	1:45.109	+0.640	5
6	7	(United Kingdom) Jack Aitken	ART Grand Prix	1:45.143	+0.674	6
7	1	(Russia) Artem Markelov	Russian Time	1:45.250	+0.781	7
8	4	(Netherlands) Nyck de Vries	Pertamina Prema Theodore Racing	1:45.269	+0.800	8
9	20	(Switzerland) Louis Delétraz	Charouz Racing System	1:45.278	+0.809	9
10	6	(Canada) Nicholas Latifi	DAMS	1:45.482	+1.013	10
11	11	(Germany) Maximilian Günther	BWT Arden	1:45.608	+1.139	11
12	3	(Indonesia) Sean Gelael	Pertamina Prema Theodore Racing	1:45.721	+1.252	12
13	17	(United States) Santino Ferrucci	Trident	1:45.739	+1.270	13
14	9	(Spain) Roberto Merhi	MP Motorsport	1:45.753	+1.284	14
15	21	(Italy) Antonio Fuoco	Charouz Racing System	1:45.919	+1.450	15
16	2	(Japan) Tadasuke Makino	Russian Time	1:45.945	+1.476	16
17	16	(India) Arjun Maini	Trident	1:46.021	+1.552	17
18	12	(Japan) Nirei Fukuzumi	BWT Arden	1:46.060	+1.591	18
19	15	(Israel) Roy Nissany	Campos Vexatec Racing	1:46.150	+1.681	19
20	10	(Switzerland) Ralph Boschung	MP Motorsport	1:46.500	+2.031	20

=== Feature race ===
Pos.	No.	Driver	Team	Laps	Time/Retired	Grid	Points
1	8	(United Kingdom) George Russell	ART Grand Prix	30	58:28.750	1	25 (4)
2	18	(Brazil) Sérgio Sette Câmara	Carlin	30	+1.108	4	18
3	14	(Italy) Luca Ghiotto	Campos Vexatec Racing	30	+37.879	5	15
4	21	(Italy) Antonio Fuoco	Charouz Racing System	30	+43.655	15	12
5	4	(Netherlands) Nyck de Vries	Pertamina Prema Theodore Racing	30	+45.680	8	10 (2)
6	20	(Switzerland) Louis Delétraz	Charouz Racing System	30	+53.226	9	8
7	6	(Canada) Nicholas Latifi	DAMS	30	+1:16.951	10	6
8	2	(Japan) Tadasuke Makino	Russian Time	30	+1:17.343	16	4
9	12	(Japan) Nirei Fukuzumi	BWT Arden	30	+1:20.384	18	2
10	16	(India) Arjun Maini	Trident	30	+1:30.605	17	1
11	7	(United Kingdom) Jack Aitken	ART Grand Prix	30	+1:32.469	6	
12	11	(Germany) Maximilian Günther	BWT Arden	30	+1:37.662	11	
13	17	(United States) Santino Ferrucci	Trident	29	+1 lap	13	
14	1	(Russia) Artem Markelov	Russian Time	29	+1 lap	7	
15	15	(Israel) Roy Nissany	Campos Vexatec Racing	29	+1 lap	19	
16	19	(United Kingdom) Lando Norris	Carlin	29	+1 lap	3	
DNF	5	(Thailand) Alexander Albon	DAMS	18	Engine	2	
DNF	10	(Switzerland) Ralph Boschung	MP Motorsport	12	Transmission	20	
DNF	3	(Indonesia) Sean Gelael	Pertamina Prema Theodore Racing	7	Spun off	12	
DSQ^{1}	9	(Spain) Roberto Merhi	MP Motorsport	30	Disqualified	14	
Fastest Lap: Nyck de Vries (Pertamina Prema Theodore Racing) 1:47.085 (on lap 26)

Notes

- ^1– Roberto Merhi was disqualified for tyre pressure infringement.

=== Sprint race ===
Pos.	No.	Driver	Team	Laps	Time/Retired	Grid	Points
1	4	(Netherlands) Nyck de Vries	Pertamina Prema Theodore Racing	21	38:28.325	4	15 (2)
2	20	(Switzerland) Louis Delétraz	Charouz Racing System	21	+9.648	3	12
3	14	(Italy) Luca Ghiotto	Campos Vexatec Racing	21	+9.870	6	10
4	21	(Italy) Antonio Fuoco	Charouz Racing System	21	+16.678	5	8
5	19	(United Kingdom) Lando Norris	Carlin	21	+17.752	16	6
6	18	(Brazil) Sérgio Sette Câmara	Carlin	21	+20.405	7	4
7	5	(Thailand) Alexander Albon	DAMS	21	+20.732	17	2
8	6	(Canada) Nicholas Latifi	DAMS	21	+24.445	2	1
9	17	(United States) Santino Ferrucci	Trident	21	+35.726	13	
10	15	(Israel) Roy Nissany	Campos Vexatec Racing	21	+49.489	15	
11	11	(Germany) Maximilian Günther	BWT Arden	21	+49.489	12	
12	12	(Japan) Nirei Fukuzumi	BWT Arden	21	+53.765	9	
13	16	(India) Arjun Maini	Trident	21	+59.010	10	
14^{1}	1	(Russia) Artem Markelov	Russian Time	20	Brakes	14	
15	9	(Spain) Roberto Merhi	MP Motorsport	20	+1 lap	20	
16	10	(Switzerland) Ralph Boschung	MP Motorsport	20	+1 lap	18	
17	8	(United Kingdom) George Russell	ART Grand Prix	19	+2 laps	8	
18	3	(Indonesia) Sean Gelael	Pertamina Prema Theodore Racing	19	Engine/Fire	19	
DNF	2	(Japan) Tadasuke Makino	Russian Time	6	Battery	1	
DNS	7	(United Kingdom) Jack Aitken	ART Grand Prix	0	Stalled	11	
Fastest lap: Ralph Boschung (MP Motorsport) 1:47.827 (on lap 15)^{2}

Notes

- ^1– Driver did not finish the race, but were classified as they completed more than 90% of the race distance.
- ^2– Ralph Boschung set the fastest lap in the race but because he finished outside the top 10, the two bonus points for fastest lap went to Nyck de Vries as he set the fastest lap inside the top 10 finishers.

== Championship standings after the round ==
Drivers' Championship standings

	Pos.	Driver	Points
	1	(United Kingdom) Lando Norris	104
2	2	(United Kingdom) George Russell	91
3	3	(Netherlands) Nyck de Vries	75
1	4	(Thailand) Alexander Albon	73
3	5	(Russia) Artem Markelov	71

Teams' Championship standings

	Pos.	Team	Points
	1	(United Kingdom) Carlin	172
	2	(France) ART Grand Prix	140
	3	(France) DAMS	106
1	4	(Italy) Pertamina Prema Theodore Racing	104
1	5	(Czech Republic) Charouz Racing System	103

== See also ==
- 2018 French Grand Prix
- 2018 Le Castellet GP3 Series round

Previous round: 2018 Monte Carlo Formula 2 round	FIA Formula 2 Championship; 2018 season	Next round: 2018 Spielberg Formula 2 round
Previous round: None	Le Castellet Formula 2 round	Next round: 2019 Le Castellet Formula 2 round
