= 2018 Monte Carlo Formula 2 round =

(Monaco) 2018 Monte Carlo Formula 2 round
Round details
- Round 4 of 12 in the 2018 FIA Formula 2 Championship.
- Layout of the Circuit de Monaco
- Location: Circuit de Monaco, Monte-Carlo, Monaco
- Course: Temporary racing facility 3.337 km (2.074 mi)

Feature race
- Date: 25 May 2018
- Laps: 42
Pole position
Driver	(Thailand) Alexander Albon	DAMS
Time	1:21.727	
Podium
First	(Russia) Artem Markelov	Russian Time
Second	(Indonesia) Sean Gelael	Pertamina Prema Theodore Racing
Third	(Spain) Roberto Merhi	MP Motorsport
Fastest lap
Driver	(Germany) Maximilian Günther	BWT Arden
- Time: 1:22.472 (on lap 38)

Sprint race
- Date: 26 May 2018
- Laps: 30
Podium
First	(Italy) Antonio Fuoco	Charouz Racing System
Second	(Switzerland) Louis Delétraz	Charouz Racing System
Third	(United Kingdom) Lando Norris	Carlin
Fastest lap
Driver	(Canada) Nicholas Latifi	DAMS
- Time: 1:22.906 (on lap 23)

The 2018 Monte Carlo Formula 2 round was a pair of motor races for Formula 2 cars that took place on 25 and 26 May 2018 at the Circuit de Monaco in Monte-Carlo, Monaco as part of the FIA Formula 2 Championship. It was the fourth round of the 2018 FIA Formula 2 Championship and ran in support of the 2018 Monaco Grand Prix.

== Report ==
=== Qualifying ===
For qualifying, the field was split into two groups due to the short nature of the circuit.

== Classifications ==
=== Qualifying ===
==== Group A ====
Pos.	No.	Driver	Team	Time	Gap	Grid
1	5	(Thailand) Alexander Albon	DAMS	1:21.727	—	1
2	1	(Russia) Artem Markelov	Russian Time	1:21.834	+0.107	3
3	21	(Italy) Antonio Fuoco	Charouz Racing System	1:21.948	+0.221	4
DSQ	11	(Germany) Maximilian Günther	BWT Arden	1:22.194	+0.467	PL^{2}
4	17	(United States) Santino Ferrucci	Trident	1:22.408	+0.681	6
5	9	(Spain) Roberto Merhi	MP Motorsport	1:22.569	+0.842	8
6	7	(United Kingdom) Jack Aitken	ART Grand Prix	1:22.597	+0.870	10
7	3	(Indonesia) Sean Gelael	Pertamina Prema Theodore Racing	1:22.654	+0.927	12
8	19	(United Kingdom) Lando Norris	Carlin	1:22.663	+0.936	17^{1}
9	15	(Israel) Roy Nissany	Campos Vexatec Racing	1:23.796	+2.069	15

- ^1– Lando Norris was given a three-place grid drop due to found guilty of impeding Alexander Albon.
- ^2– Maximilian Günther was disqualified as his car did not stop to be weighed during the session but allowed to start the Feature Race from pit lane.

==== Group B ====
Pos.	No.	Driver	Team	Time	Gap	Grid
1	4	(Netherlands) Nyck de Vries	Pertamina Prema Theodore Racing	1:21.737	—	2
2	18	(Brazil) Sérgio Sette Câmara	Carlin	1:21.901	+0.326	WD^{3}
3	14	(Italy) Luca Ghiotto	Campos Vexatec Racing	1:22.241	+0.504	5
4	16	(India) Arjun Maini	Trident	1:22.263	+0.526	7
5	10	(Switzerland) Ralph Boschung	MP Motorsport	1:22.307	+0.570	9
6	2	(Japan) Tadasuke Makino	Russian Time	1:22.420	+0.683	11
7	12	(Japan) Nirei Fukuzumi	BWT Arden	1:22.707	+0.970	13
8	20	(Switzerland) Louis Delétraz	Charouz Racing System	1:22.717	+0.980	14
9	8	(United Kingdom) George Russell	ART Grand Prix	1:22.977	+1.240	16
10	6	(Canada) Nicholas Latifi	DAMS	1:23.157	+1.420	18

- ^3– Sérgio Sette Câmara had not give permission to start after suffering a hand injury from qualifying crash.

=== Feature Race ===
Pos.	No.	Driver	Team	Laps	Time / Gap	Grid	Points
1	1	(Russia) Artem Markelov	Russian Time	42	1:02:03.286	3	25 (2)
2	3	(Indonesia) Sean Gelael	Pertamina Prema Theodore Racing	42	+10.713	12	18
3	9	(Spain) Roberto Merhi	MP Motorsport	42	+15.489	8	15
4	20	(Switzerland) Louis Delétraz	Charouz Racing System	42	+19.236	14	12
5	16	(India) Arjun Maini	Trident	42	+20.135	7	10
6	19	(United Kingdom) Lando Norris	Carlin	42	+20.637	17	8
7	7	(United Kingdom) Jack Aitken	ART Grand Prix	42	+21.986	10	6
8	21	(Italy) Antonio Fuoco	Charouz Racing System	42	+23.855	4	4
9	6	(Canada) Nicholas Latifi	DAMS	42	+24.861	18	2
10	12	(Japan) Nirei Fukuzumi	BWT Arden	42	+30.944	13	1
11	11	(Germany) Maximilian Günther	BWT Arden	42	+31.532	PL	
12	15	(Israel) Roy Nissany	Campos Vexatec Racing	42	+49.749	15	
13	17	(United States) Santino Ferrucci	Trident	42	+1:27.440	6	
14	2	(Japan) Tadasuke Makino	Russian Time	39	+3 laps	11	
DNF	5	(Thailand) Alexander Albon	DAMS	22	Collision Damage	1	(4)
DNF	4	(Netherlands) Nyck de Vries	Pertamina Prema Theodore Racing	19	Collision Damage	2	
DNF	10	(Switzerland) Ralph Boschung	MP Motorsport	11	Collision	9	
DNF	8	(United Kingdom) George Russell	ART Grand Prix	5	Accident	16	
DNF	14	(Italy) Luca Ghiotto	Campos Vexatec Racing	0	Collision	5	
DNS	18	(Brazil) Sérgio Sette Câmara	Carlin	0	Did not start	–	
Fastest lap: (Germany) Maximilian Günther (BWT Arden) – 1:22.472 (on lap 38)^{4}

- ^4– Maximilian Günther set the fastest lap in the race but because he finished outside the top 10, the two bonus points for fastest lap went to Artem Markelov as he set the fastest lap inside the top 10 finishers.

=== Sprint Race ===
Pos.	No.	Driver	Team	Laps	Time / Gap	Grid	Points
1	21	(Italy) Antonio Fuoco	Charouz Racing System	30	48:44.373^{5}	1	15
2	20	(Switzerland) Louis Delétraz	Charouz Racing System	30	+2.069	5	12
3	19	(United Kingdom) Lando Norris	Carlin	30	+2.272^{5}	3	10
4	1	(Russia) Artem Markelov	Russian Time	30	+4.091	8	8
5	16	(India) Arjun Maini	Trident	30	+7.449	4	6
6	11	(Germany) Maximilian Günther	BWT Arden	30	+7.955	11	4
7	9	(Spain) Roberto Merhi	MP Motorsport	30	+11.099^{6}	6	2
8	6	(Canada) Nicholas Latifi	DAMS	30	+12.242	9	1 (2)
9	4	(Netherlands) Nyck de Vries	Pertamina Prema Theodore Racing	29	+1 lap	15	
10	14	(Italy) Luca Ghiotto	Campos Vexatec Racing	29	+1 lap	18	
11	12	(Japan) Nirei Fukuzumi	BWT Arden	27	Accident^{9}	10	
12	17	(United States) Santino Ferrucci	Trident	27	Accident^{9}	13	
DNF	15	(Israel) Roy Nissany	Campos Vexatec Racing	25	Accident	12	
DNF	5	(Thailand) Alexander Albon	DAMS	25	Accident	19^{8}	
DNF	10	(Switzerland) Ralph Boschung	MP Motorsport	20	Engine	16	
DNF	8	(United Kingdom) George Russell	ART Grand Prix	18	Accident	17	
DNF	3	(Indonesia) Sean Gelael	Pertamina Prema Theodore Racing	3	Accident	7	
DNF	2	(Japan) Tadasuke Makino	Russian Time	2	Suspension	14	
DNF	7	(United Kingdom) Jack Aitken	ART Grand Prix	1	Engine	2	
DNS	18	(Brazil) Sérgio Sette Câmara	Carlin	0	Did not start	–	
Fastest lap: (Canada) Nicholas Latifi (DAMS) – 1:22.906 (on lap 23)

- ^5– Antonio Fuoco was added 0.8 seconds and Lando Norris was added 1.1 seconds for VSC infractions.
- ^6– Roberto Merhi was handed a five-second time penalty for overtaking Arjun Maini under the Safety Car.
- ^7– Santino Ferrucci was handed a ten-second time penalty for having carried out clutch bite point checks in the pitlane, failing to comply with instructions from the race director.
- ^8– Alexander Albon was handed a five-place penalty for colliding with Nyck de Vries at pit entry in the Feature Race.
- ^9— Santino Ferrucci and Nirei Fukuzumi were classified despite retiring as they have completed more than 90% of the race.

== Championship standings after the round ==
Drivers' Championship standings

	Pos.	Driver	Points
	1	(United Kingdom) Lando Norris	98
5	2	(Russia) Artem Markelov	71
1	3	(Thailand) Alexander Albon	71
1	4	(United Kingdom) George Russell	62
1	5	(United Kingdom) Jack Aitken	49

Teams' Championship standings

	Pos.	Entrant	Points
	1	(United Kingdom) Carlin	144
	2	(France) ART Grand Prix	111
	3	(France) DAMS	97
1	4	(Russia) Russian Time	75
1	5	(Italy) Pertamina Prema Theodore Racing	75

Previous round: 2018 Barcelona FIA Formula 2 round	FIA Formula 2 Championship; 2018 season	Next round: 2018 Paul Ricard FIA Formula 2 round
Previous round: 2017 Monaco FIA Formula 2 round	FIA Formula 2 round	Next round: 2019 Monaco FIA Formula 2 round
