= Russian Time =

Racing team

(Russia) Russian Time
- Founded: 2013
- Founder(s): Igor Mazepa; Timo Rumpfkeil
- Folded: 2018
- Base: Norwich, Norfolk, England
- Team principal(s): Svetlana Strelnikova
- Former series: FIA Formula 2 Championship; GP2 Series
- Noted drivers: (United Kingdom) Sam Bird (New Zealand) Mitch Evans (Italy) Luca Ghiotto (Italy) Raffaele Marciello (Russia) Artem Markelov
- Teams' Championships: GP2 Series: 2013; FIA Formula 2 Championship: 2017
- Website: http://www.rus-time.com

Russian Time (previously known as RT Russian Time) was a Russian motor racing team founded by Igor Mazepa to compete in the GP2 Series, a category of open-wheel racing cars designed to prepare drivers for Formula One.

The team was managed by Motopark in 2013, iSport International in 2014 and Virtuosi Racing from 2015 to 2018.

== Racing history ==
=== GP2 Series ===
Russian Time was established by former Russian racing driver and manager Igor Mazepa and Motopark Academy team principal Timo Rumpfkeil in 2013. The team had sought an entry to the GP2 Series for two years before finally being accepted in 2013, replacing iSport International. iSport International withdrew from the series after being unable to secure a budget to compete in the upcoming season, and so its management elected to shut the team down in order to avoid bankruptcy.

The team won its first race in only its fourth appearance, when Sam Bird won the sprint race of the Bahrain round of the championship. The team took a second win on the streets of Monaco, with Bird finishing ahead of Kevin Ceccon after a fourteen-car pile-up on the opening lap forced nine drivers out of the race. In 2014, the team made their debut in GP3 Series, taking Bamboo Engineering's slot and continue to participate in GP2, German Formula Three and ADAC Formel Masters.

The team's preparations for the 2014 season were disrupted by the death of Mazepa from complications relating to thrombosis in February 2014. Following this, Motopark Academy ended their partnership with team, leaving their participation in the 2014 GP2 and GP3 seasons in limbo. The team reunited with iSport International to continue their GP2 programme, signing Mitch Evans and Artem Markelov, but chose to abandon their plans for their GP3 entry, selling it on to Hilmer Motorsport.

Evans and Markelov were retained for the 2015 season, the first time a GP2 team has entered back to back seasons with the same lineup since DAMS retained Kamui Kobayashi and Jérôme d'Ambrosio in 2009. But the team changed the management from iSport to Virtuosi Racing. The team finished fifth in the team's championship, with two sprint race wins for Evans.

For the 2016 season, Markelov was retained for a third season with Raffaele Marciello joining the team. Markelov achieved his maiden victory at the Monaco feature race, having started fifteenth on the grid. Marciello finished fourth in the standings and Markelov tenth with the team taking third in the constructor's championship.

=== FIA Formula 2 Championship ===
In 2017, Markelov remained with the team for a fourth season with Luca Ghiotto joining the team, moving from Trident. Their combination brought six wins—five for Markelov and one for Ghiotto—and the first teams' title in the history of FIA Formula 2 Championship. The team was omitted from the preliminary entry list for the 2018 championship, but later confirmed their participation, retaining Markelov and hiring European Formula 3 driver Tadasuke Makino to replace Ghiotto. The team was not able to repeat their success with the new F2 car, finishing the season fourth in the teams' standings, while Markelov downgraded to fifth in the drivers' championship with three wins. Makino won a feature race at Monza, but finished outside the top-ten in the drivers' standings. The team were sold before the 2018 finale and became UNI-Virtuosi Racing.

== Results ==
=== GP2 Series ===
Year	Car	Run by	Drivers	Races	Wins	Poles	F.L.	Points	D.C.	T.C.
2013	Dallara GP2/11-Mecachrome	Motopark Academy	(United Kingdom) Sam Bird	22	5	2	3	181	**2nd**	**1st**
2013	Dallara GP2/11-Mecachrome	Motopark Academy	(France) Tom Dillmann	22	0	1	2	92	10th	**1st**
2014	Dallara GP2/11-Mecachrome	iSport International	(New Zealand) Mitch Evans	22	2	0	1	174	4th	5th
2014	Dallara GP2/11-Mecachrome	iSport International	(Russia) Artem Markelov	22	0	0	0	6	24th	5th
2015	Dallara GP2/11-Mecachrome	Virtuosi Racing	(New Zealand) Mitch Evans	21	2	0	3	135	5th	5th
2015	Dallara GP2/11-Mecachrome	Virtuosi Racing	(Russia) Artem Markelov	21	0	0	0	48	13th	5th
2016	Dallara GP2/11-Mecachrome	Virtuosi Racing	(Italy) Raffaele Marciello	22	0	0	0	159	4th	**3rd**
2016	Dallara GP2/11-Mecachrome	Virtuosi Racing	(Russia) Artem Markelov	22	1	0	3	97	10th	**3rd**

=== FIA Formula 2 Championship ===
Year	Car	Run by	Drivers	Races	Wins	Poles	F.L.	Points	D.C.	T.C.
2017	Dallara GP2/11-Mecachrome	Virtuosi Racing	(Russia) Artem Markelov	22	5	1	6	210	**2nd**	**1st**
2017	Dallara GP2/11-Mecachrome	Virtuosi Racing	(Italy) Luca Ghiotto	22	1	0	0	185	4th	**1st**
2018	Dallara F2 2018-Mecachrome	Virtuosi Racing	(Russia) Artem Markelov	24	3	0	5	186	5th	4th
2018	Dallara F2 2018-Mecachrome	Virtuosi Racing	(Japan) Tadasuke Makino	24	1	0	0	48	13th	4th

=== GP2 Series ===
(key) (Races in bold indicate pole position) (Races in italics indicate fastest lap)

Year	Chassis Engine Tyres	Drivers	1	2	3	4	5	6	7	8	9	10	11	12	13	14	15	16	17	18	19	20	21	22	T.C.	Points
2013	GP2/11; Mecachrome; **P**		SEP; FEA	SEP; SPR	BHR; FEA	BHR; SPR	CAT; FEA	CAT; SPR	MON; FEA	MON; SPR	SIL; FEA	SIL; SPR	NÜR; FEA	NÜR; SPR	HUN; FEA	HUN; SPR	SPA; FEA	SPA; SPR	MNZ; FEA	MNZ; SPR	MRN; FEA	MRN; SPR	YMC; FEA	YMC; SPR	1st	273
2013	GP2/11; Mecachrome; **P**	(United Kingdom) Sam Bird	7	Ret	6	1	21^{†}	12	1	24	1	5	13	8	10	8	**1**	14	**2**	4	8	1	10	4	1st	273
2013	GP2/11; Mecachrome; **P**	(France) Tom Dillmann	14	11	8	4	5	26	11	25	3	6	8	Ret	**20**	11	5	9	3	5	6	14	Ret	DNS	1st	273
2014	GP2/11; Mecachrome; **P**		BHR; FEA	BHR; SPR	CAT; FEA	CAT; SPR	MON; FEA	MON; SPR	RBR; FEA	RBR; SPR	SIL; FEA	SIL; SPR	HOC; FEA	HOC; SPR	HUN; FEA	HUN; SPR	SPA; FEA	SPA; SPR	MNZ; FEA	MNZ; SPR	SOC; FEA	SOC; SPR	YMC; FEA	YMC; SPR	5th	180
2014	GP2/11; Mecachrome; **P**	(New Zealand) Mitch Evans	14	7	14	20^{†}	2	6	7	4	1	7	1	11	12	9	5	4	3	20^{†}	2	4	3	5	5th	180
2014	GP2/11; Mecachrome; **P**	(Russia) Artem Markelov	15	10	11	Ret	Ret	Ret	21	16	18	17	Ret	12	16	20^{†}	7	Ret	21	Ret	16	12	Ret	19	5th	180
2015	GP2/11; Mecachrome; **P**		BHR; FEA	BHR; SPR	CAT; FEA	CAT; SPR	MON; FEA	MON; SPR	RBR; FEA	RBR; SPR	SIL; FEA	SIL; SPR	HUN; FEA	HUN; SPR	SPA; FEA	SPA; SPR	MNZ; FEA	MNZ; SPR	SOC; FEA	SOC; SPR	BHR; FEA	BHR; SPR	YMC; FEA	YMC; SPR	5th	183
2015	GP2/11; Mecachrome; **P**	(New Zealand) Mitch Evans	6	17	2	DNS	Ret	DNS	10	5	Ret	20	17	22	5	3	3	1	11	8	3	1	3	C	5th	183
2015	GP2/11; Mecachrome; **P**	(Russia) Artem Markelov	13	12	12	5	Ret	14	5	DSQ	21	14	22	18	3	5	5	14	Ret	12	16	8	Ret	C	5th	183
2016	GP2/11; Mecachrome; **P**		CAT; FEA	CAT; SPR	MON; FEA	MON; SPR	BAK; FEA	BAK; SPR	RBR; FEA	RBR; SPR	SIL; FEA	SIL; SPR	HUN; FEA	HUN; SPR	HOC; FEA	HOC; SPR	SPA; FEA	SPA; SPR	MNZ; FEA	MNZ; SPR	SEP; FEA	SEP; SPR	YMC; FEA	YMC; SPR	3rd	256
2016	GP2/11; Mecachrome; **P**	(Italy) Raffaele Marciello	8	5	6	3	3	11	3	4	9	6	4	8	3	7	4	5	2	14	6	2	10	13	3rd	256
2016	GP2/11; Mecachrome; **P**	(Russia) Artem Markelov	4	4	1	8	Ret	5	Ret	11	10	12	9	4	Ret	9	5	21^{†}	10	10	DNS	13	3	7	3rd	256

=== FIA Formula 2 Championship ===
Year	Chassis Engine Tyres	Drivers	1	2	3	4	5	6	7	8	9	10	11	12	13	14	15	16	17	18	19	20	21	22	23	24	T.C.	Points
2017	GP2/11; Mecachrome; **P**		BHR; FEA	BHR; SPR	CAT; FEA	CAT; SPR	MON; FEA	MON; SPR	BAK; FEA	BAK; SPR	RBR; FEA	RBR; SPR	SIL; FEA	SIL; SPR	HUN; FEA	HUN; SPR	SPA; FEA	SPA; SPR	MNZ; FEA	MNZ; SPR	JER; FEA	JER; SPR	YMC; FEA	YMC; SPR			1st	395
2017	GP2/11; Mecachrome; **P**	(Italy) Luca Ghiotto	7	2	2	7	5	4	16	7	14	4	6	2	6	8	2	3	4	1	7	4	3	5			1st	395
2017	GP2/11; Mecachrome; **P**	(Russia) Artem Markelov	1	8	8	9	2	5	4	5	8	1	4	3	17^{†}	9	1	Ret	9	15	5	1	**1**	6			1st	395
2018	F2 2018; Mecachrome; **P**		BHR; FEA	BHR; SPR	BAK; FEA	BAK; SPR	CAT; FEA	CAT; SPR	MON; FEA	MON; SPR	LEC; FEA	LEC; SPR	RBR; FEA	RBR; SPR	SIL; FEA	SIL; SPR	HUN; FEA	HUN; SPR	SPA; FEA	SPA; SPR	MNZ; FEA	MNZ; SPR	SOC; FEA	SOC; SPR	YMC; FEA	YMC; SPR	4th	234
2018	F2 2018; Mecachrome; **P**	(Russia) Artem Markelov	3	1	Ret	Ret	8	9	1	4	14	14^{†}	8	1	6	4	8	13	6	5	2	2	11	5	2	7	4th	234
2018	F2 2018; Mecachrome; **P**	(Japan) Tadasuke Makino	19	17	9	9	9	Ret	14^{†}	Ret	8	Ret	7	6	12	11	9	12	12	11	1	14	10	11	9	Ret	4th	234

Achievements
Preceded by DAMS	GP2 Series Teams' Champion; 2013	Succeeded by DAMS
Preceded by Prema Racing (GP2 Series)	FIA Formula 2 Teams' Champion; 2017	Succeeded by Carlin
