= 2018 Yas Island Formula 2 round =

Car racing competition

(United Arab Emirates) 2018 Yas Marina Formula 2 round
Round details
- Round 12 of 12 in the 2018 FIA Formula 2 Championship.
- Layout of the Yas Marina Circuit
- Location: Yas Marina Circuit, Abu Dhabi, United Arab Emirates
- Course: Permanent racing facility 5.554 km (3.451 mi)

Feature race
- Date: 24 November 2018
- Laps: 29
Pole position
Driver	(United Kingdom) George Russell	ART Grand Prix
Time	1:49.251	
Podium
First	(United Kingdom) George Russell	ART Grand Prix
Second	(Russia) Artem Markelov	Russian Time
Third	(Italy) Luca Ghiotto	Campos Vexatech Racing
Fastest lap
Driver	(Italy) Luca Ghiotto	Campos Vexatech Racing
- Time: 1:53.194 (on lap 27)

Sprint race
- Date: 25 November 2018
- Laps: 21
Podium
First	(Italy) Antonio Fuoco	Charouz Racing System
Second	(United Kingdom) Lando Norris	Carlin
Third	(Spain) Roberto Merhi	Campos Vexatech Racing
Fastest lap
Driver	(United Kingdom) George Russell	ART Grand Prix
- Time: 1:57.590 (on lap 5)

The 2018 Yas Marina FIA Formula 2 round was a pair of motor races held on 24 and 25 November 2018 at the Yas Marina Circuit in Abu Dhabi, United Arab Emirates as part of the FIA Formula 2 Championship. It was the final round of the 2018 FIA Formula 2 Championship and was run in support of the 2018 Abu Dhabi Grand Prix.

With his seventh race win of the season, George Russell claimed the championship title after winning the Feature Race in Abu Dhabi and became the second rookie in the modern Formula 2 era to win the championship after Charles Leclerc, who had won the championship in the previous season with a joint-record 7 wins.

== Classifications ==
=== Qualifying ===
Pos.	No.	Driver	Team	Time	Gap	Grid
1	8	(United Kingdom) George Russell	ART Grand Prix	1:49.251	–	1
2	4	(Netherlands) Nyck de Vries	Pertamina Prema Theodore Racing	1:49.541	+0.290	2
3	6	(Canada) Nicholas Latifi	DAMS	1:49.647	+0.396	3
4	1	(Russia) Artem Markelov	Russian Time	1:49.869	+0.618	4
5	7	(United Kingdom) Jack Aitken	ART Grand Prix	1:49.946	+0.695	5
6	20	(Switzerland) Louis Delétraz	Charouz Racing System	1:50.038	+0.787	6
7	19	(United Kingdom) Lando Norris	Carlin	1:50.059	+0.808	7
8	5	(Thailand) Alexander Albon	DAMS	1:50.155	+0.904	8
9	2	(Japan) Tadasuke Makino	Russian Time	1:50.180	+0.929	9
10	18	(Brazil) Sérgio Sette Câmara	Carlin	1:50.187	+0.936	10
11	10	(Finland) Niko Kari	MP Motorsport	1:50.375	+1.124	14^{1}
12	15	(Spain) Roberto Merhi	Campos Vexatec Racing	1:50.513	+1.262	11
13	21	(Italy) Antonio Fuoco	Charouz Racing System	1:50.522	+1.271	12
14	11	(United Kingdom) Dan Ticktum	BWT Arden	1:50.580	+1.329	13
15	3	(Indonesia) Sean Gelael	Pertamina Prema Theodore Racing	1:50.812	+1.561	15
16	17	(Italy) Alessio Lorandi	Trident	1:50.855	+1.604	20^{2}
17	14	(Italy) Luca Ghiotto	Campos Vexatec Racing	1:50.892	+1.641	16
18	9	(France) Dorian Boccolacci	MP Motorsport	1:51.037	+1.786	17
19	12	(Japan) Nirei Fukuzumi	BWT Arden	1:51.048	+1.797	18
20	16	(India) Arjun Maini	Trident	1:51.597	+2.346	19

Notes

- ^1 – Niko Kari was given a three-place grid penalty for leaving the track and gaining an advantage at the previous round in Sochi.
- ^2 – Alessio Lorandi was given a five-place grid penalty for causing a collision at the previous round in Sochi.

=== Feature Race ===
Pos.	No.	Driver	Team	Laps	Time/Retired	Grid	Points
1	8	(United Kingdom) George Russell	ART Grand Prix	29	1:03:33.863	1	25 (4)
2	1	(Russia) Artem Markelov	Russian Time	29	+3.301	4	18
3	14	(Italy) Luca Ghiotto	Campos Vexatec Racing	29	+8.283	16	15 (2)
4	4	(Netherlands) Nyck de Vries	Pertamina Prema Theodore Racing	29	+12.046	2	12
5	19	(United Kingdom) Lando Norris	Carlin	29	+19.050	7	10
6	20	(Switzerland) Louis Delétraz	Charouz Racing System	29	+21.964	6	8
7	21	(Italy) Antonio Fuoco	Charouz Racing System	29	+23.633	12	6
8	15	(Spain) Roberto Merhi	Campos Vexatec Racing	29	+27.375	11	4
9	2	(Japan) Tadasuke Makino	Russian Time	29	+27.840	9	2
10	7	(United Kingdom) Jack Aitken	ART Grand Prix	29	+32.786	5	1
11	11	(United Kingdom) Dan Ticktum	BWT Arden	29	+42.485	13	
12	9	(France) Dorian Boccolacci	MP Motorsport	29	+46.303	17	
13	17	(Italy) Alessio Lorandi	Trident	29	+47.809	20	
14	5	(Thailand) Alexander Albon	DAMS	29	+55.571	8	
15	10	(Finland) Niko Kari	MP Motorsport	29	+1:10.190	14	
16	18	(Brazil) Sérgio Sette Câmara	Carlin	29	+1:10.766	10	
17	3	(Indonesia) Sean Gelael	Pertamina Prema Theodore Racing	29	+1:29.971	15	
DNF	6	(Canada) Nicholas Latifi	DAMS	0	Accident	3	
DNF	12	(Japan) Nirei Fukuzumi	BWT Arden	0	Accident	18	
DNF	16	(India) Arjun Maini	Trident	0	Accident	19	
Fastest lap: Luca Ghiotto (Campos Vexatech Racing) 1:53.194 (on lap 27)

=== Sprint Race ===
Pos.	No.	Driver	Team	Laps	Time/Retired	Grid	Points
1	21	(Italy) Antonio Fuoco	Charouz Racing System	21	42:48.729	2	15
2	19	(United Kingdom) Lando Norris	Carlin	21	+1.713	4	12
3	15	(Spain) Roberto Merhi	Campos Vexatec Racing	21	+3.672	1	10
4	8	(United Kingdom) George Russell	ART Grand Prix	21	+8.548	8	8 (2)
5	4	(Netherlands) Nyck de Vries	Pertamina Prema Theodore Racing	21	+9.458	5	6
6	20	(Switzerland) Louis Delétraz	Charouz Racing System	21	+11.050	3	4
7	1	(Russia) Artem Markelov	Russian Time	21	+12.960	7	2
8	5	(Thailand) Alexander Albon	DAMS	21	+15.047	14	1
9	14	(Italy) Luca Ghiotto	Campos Vexatec Racing	21	+19.646	6	
10	18	(Brazil) Sérgio Sette Câmara	Carlin	21	+23.052	16	
11	9	(France) Dorian Boccolacci	MP Motorsport	21	+24.429	12	
12	12	(Japan) Nirei Fukuzumi	BWT Arden	21	+27.843	19	
13	7	(United Kingdom) Jack Aitken	ART Grand Prix	21	+30.535	10	
14	17	(Italy) Alessio Lorandi	Trident	21	+33.205	13	
15	6	(Canada) Nicholas Latifi	DAMS	21	+1:36.014	18	
DNF	11	(United Kingdom) Dan Ticktum	BWT Arden	3	Engine	11	
DNF	10	(Finland) Niko Kari	MP Motorsport	1	Damage	15	
DNF	2	(Japan) Tadasuke Makino	Russian Time	0	Accident	9	
DNF	3	(Indonesia) Sean Gelael	Pertamina Prema Theodore Racing	0	Accident	17	
DNS	16	(India) Arjun Maini	Trident	0	Did not start	20	
Fastest lap: George Russell (ART Grand Prix) 1:57.590 (on lap 5)

== Final championship standings ==
Drivers' Championship standings

	Pos.	Driver	Points
	1	(United Kingdom) George Russell	287
1	2	(United Kingdom) Lando Norris	219
1	3	(Thailand) Alexander Albon	212
	4	(Netherlands) Nyck de Vries	202
	5	(Russia) Artem Markelov	186

Teams' Championship standings

	Pos.	Team	Points
	1	(United Kingdom) Carlin	383
	2	(France) ART Grand Prix	350
	3	(France) DAMS	303
1	4	(Russia) Russian Time	234
1	5	(Italy) Pertamina Prema Theodore Racing	231

== See also ==
- 2018 Abu Dhabi Grand Prix
- 2018 Yas Marina GP3 Series round

Previous round: 2018 Sochi Formula 2 round	FIA Formula 2 Championship; 2018 season	Next round: 2019 Sakhir Formula 2 round
Previous round: 2017 Yas Island Formula 2 round	Yas Island Formula 2 round	Next round: 2019 Yas Island Formula 2 round
