= Le Castellet Formula 2 round =

(France) Le Castellet Formula 2 round

FIA Formula 2 Championship
- Venue: Circuit Paul Ricard
- Location: Le Castellet, Var, France
- First race: 2018
- Last race: 2022
- Most wins (driver): (Netherlands) Nyck de Vries (2)
- Most wins (team): (France) ART Grand Prix (2)
- Lap record: 1:44.584 ( (Netherlands) Nyck de Vries, ART Grand Prix, Dallara F2 2018, 2019)

The Le Castellet Formula 2 round was a FIA Formula 2 Championship series race that was run on the Circuit Paul Ricard track in Le Castellet, France.

== Winners ==
Year	Race	Driver	Team	Report
2018	Feature	(United Kingdom) George Russell	ART Grand Prix	Report
2018	Sprint	(Netherlands) Nyck de Vries	Pertamina Prema Theodore Racing	Report
2019	Feature	(Netherlands) Nyck de Vries	ART Grand Prix	Report
2019	Sprint	(France) Anthoine Hubert	BWT Arden	Report
2022	Sprint	(New Zealand) Liam Lawson	Carlin	Report
2022	Feature	(Japan) Ayumu Iwasa	DAMS	Report

== See also ==
- French Grand Prix
