= 2018 Sochi Formula 2 round =

(Russia) 2018 Sochi Formula 2 round
Round details
- Round 11 of 12 in the 2018 FIA Formula 2 Championship.
- Layout of the Sochi Autodrom
- Location: Sochi Autodrom, Sochi, Krasnodar Krai, Russia
- Course: Permanent racing facility 5.848 km (3.633 mi)

Feature race
- Date: 29 September 2018
- Laps: 28
Pole position
Driver	(Netherlands) Nyck de Vries	Pertamina Prema Theodore Racing
Time	1:46.476	
Podium
First	(Thailand) Alexander Albon	DAMS
Second	(Canada) Nicholas Latifi	DAMS
Third	(Netherlands) Nyck de Vries	Pertamina Prema Theodore Racing
Fastest lap
Driver	(Netherlands) Nyck de Vries	Pertamina Prema Theodore Racing
- Time: 1:51.929 (on lap 8)

Sprint race
- Date: 30 September 2018
- Laps: 21
Podium
First	(United Kingdom) George Russell	ART Grand Prix
Second	(Brazil) Sérgio Sette Câmara	Carlin
Third	(Thailand) Alexander Albon	DAMS
Fastest lap
Driver	(United Kingdom) George Russell	ART Grand Prix
- Time: 1:50.501 (on lap 5)

The 2018 Sochi FIA Formula 2 round was a pair of motor races held on 29 and 30 September 2018 at the Sochi Autodrom in Sochi, Russia as part of the FIA Formula 2 Championship. It was the penultimate round of the 2018 FIA Formula 2 Championship and was run in support of the 2018 Russian Grand Prix.

== Classifications ==
=== Qualifying ===
Pos.	No.	Driver	Team	Time	Gap	Grid
1	4	(Netherlands) Nyck de Vries	Pertamina Prema Theodore Racing	1:46.476	–	1
2	19	(United Kingdom) Lando Norris	Carlin	1:46.696	+0.220	2
3	8	(United Kingdom) George Russell	ART Grand Prix	1:46.839	+0.363	3
4	6	(Canada) Nicholas Latifi	DAMS	1:46.890	+0.414	4
5	5	(Thailand) Alexander Albon	DAMS	1:47.039	+0.563	5
6	14	(Italy) Luca Ghiotto	Campos Vexatec Racing	1:47.151	+0.675	6
7	2	(Japan) Tadasuke Makino	Russian Time	1:47.372	+0.896	7
8	18	(Brazil) Sérgio Sette Câmara	Carlin	1:47.384	+0.908	8
9	7	(United Kingdom) Jack Aitken	ART Grand Prix	1:47.634	+1.158	9
10	11	(Germany) Maximilian Günther	BWT Arden	1:47.743	+1.267	10
11	21	(Italy) Antonio Fuoco	Charouz Racing System	1:47.774	+1.298	11
12	15	(Spain) Roberto Merhi	Campos Vexatec Racing	1:47.854	+1.378	12
13	17	(Italy) Alessio Lorandi	Trident	1:48.006	+1.530	13
14	20	(Switzerland) Louis Delétraz	Charouz Racing System	1:48.105	+1.629	14
15	3	(Indonesia) Sean Gelael	Pertamina Prema Theodore Racing	1:48.154	+1.678	15
16	10	(Finland) Niko Kari	MP Motorsport	1:48.206	+1.730	16
17	12	(Japan) Nirei Fukuzumi	BWT Arden	1:48.327	+1.851	17
18	9	(France) Dorian Boccolacci	MP Motorsport	1:48.491	+2.015	18
19	1	(Russia) Artem Markelov	Russian Time	1:48.568	+2.092	19
107% time: 1:53.929
—	16	(India) Arjun Maini	Trident	2:14.971	+28.495	20

=== Feature Race ===
Pos.	No.	Driver	Team	Laps	Time/Retired	Grid	Points
1	5	(Thailand) Alexander Albon	DAMS	28	54:12.383	5	25
2	6	(Canada) Nicholas Latifi	DAMS	28	+11.307	4	18
3	4	(Netherlands) Nyck de Vries	Pertamina Prema Theodore Racing	28	+14.259	1	15 (6)
4	8	(United Kingdom) George Russell	ART Grand Prix	28	+17.468	3	12
5	18	(Brazil) Sérgio Sette Câmara	Carlin	28	+22.953	8	10
6	21	(Italy) Antonio Fuoco	Charouz Racing System	28	+34.899	11	8
7	17	(Italy) Alessio Lorandi	Trident	28	+39.133	13	6
8	12	(Japan) Nirei Fukuzumi	BWT Arden	28	+43.463	17	4
9	15	(Spain) Roberto Merhi	Campos Vexatec Racing	28	+46.334^{1}	12	2
10	2	(Japan) Tadasuke Makino	Russian Time	28	+46.461	7	1
11	1	(Russia) Artem Markelov	Russian Time	28	+53.455	19	
12	20	(Switzerland) Louis Delétraz	Charouz Racing System	28	+56.606^{2}	14	
13	9	(France) Dorian Boccolacci	MP Motorsport	28	+1:00.950	18	
14	7	(United Kingdom) Jack Aitken	ART Grand Prix	28	+1:06.522	9	
15	16	(India) Arjun Maini	Trident	27	+1 lap	20	
16	11	(Germany) Maximilian Günther	BWT Arden	26	Spun off	10	
DNF	10	(Finland) Niko Kari	MP Motorsport	23	Mechanical	16	
DNF	19	(United Kingdom) Lando Norris	Carlin	6	Wheel	2	
DNF	14	(Italy) Luca Ghiotto	Campos Vexatec Racing	1	Accident damage	6	
DNS	3	(Indonesia) Sean Gelael	Pertamina Prema Theodore Racing	0	Clutch	15	
Fastest lap: Nyck de Vries (Pertamina Prema Theodore Racing) 1:51.929 (on lap 8)

Notes

- ^1 – Roberto Merhi originally finished 8th but received a five-second time penalty for leaving the track and gaining an advantage.
- ^2 – Louis Delétraz originally finished 9th but received a ten-second time penalty for crossing the pit entry line and a five-second time penalty for leaving the track and gaining an advantage.

=== Sprint Race ===
Pos.	No.	Driver	Team	Laps	Time/Retired	Grid	Points
1	8	(United Kingdom) George Russell	ART Grand Prix	21	44:46.259	5	15 (2)
2	18	(Brazil) Sérgio Sette Câmara	Carlin	21	+7.438	4	12
3	5	(Thailand) Alexander Albon	DAMS	21	+8.216	8	10
4	4	(Netherlands) Nyck de Vries	Pertamina Prema Theodore Racing	21	+19.132	6	8
5	1	(Russia) Artem Markelov	Russian Time	21	+22.258	11	6
6	15	(Spain) Roberto Merhi	Campos Vexatec Racing	21	+27.778	9	4
7	12	(Japan) Nirei Fukuzumi	BWT Arden	21	+30.852	1	2
8	9	(France) Dorian Boccolacci	MP Motorsport	21	+35.190	13	1
9	21	(Italy) Antonio Fuoco	Charouz Racing System	21	+39.981	3	
10	11	(Germany) Maximilian Günther	BWT Arden	21	+47.076	16	
11	2	(Japan) Tadasuke Makino	Russian Time	21	+50.708	10	
12	3	(Indonesia) Sean Gelael	Pertamina Prema Theodore Racing	21	+53.110	20	
13	20	(Switzerland) Louis Delétraz	Charouz Racing System	21	+53.404	12	
14	14	(Italy) Luca Ghiotto	Campos Vexatec Racing	21	+53.553	19	
15	16	(India) Arjun Maini	Trident	21	+1:42.002	15	
DNF	19	(United Kingdom) Lando Norris	Carlin	16	Puncture/Collision damage	18	
DNF	7	(United Kingdom) Jack Aitken	ART Grand Prix	11	Spun off	14	
DNF	10	(Finland) Niko Kari	MP Motorsport	10	Accident	17	
DNF	17	(Italy) Alessio Lorandi	Trident	0	Accident	2	
DNF	6	(Canada) Nicholas Latifi	DAMS	0	Accident	7	
Fastest lap: George Russell (ART Grand Prix) 1:50.501 (on lap 5)

== Championship standings after the round ==
Drivers' Championship standings

	Pos.	Driver	Points
	1	(United Kingdom) George Russell	248
1	2	(Thailand) Alexander Albon	211
1	3	(United Kingdom) Lando Norris	197
1	4	(Netherlands) Nyck de Vries	184
1	5	(Russia) Artem Markelov	166

Teams' Championship standings

	Pos.	Team	Points
	1	(United Kingdom) Carlin	361
	2	(France) ART Grand Prix	310
	3	(France) DAMS	302
1	4	(Italy) Pertamina Prema Theodore Racing	213
1	5	(Russia) Russian Time	212

== See also ==
- 2018 Russian Grand Prix
- 2018 Sochi GP3 Series round

Previous round: 2018 Monza Formula 2 round	FIA Formula 2 Championship; 2018 season	Next round: 2018 Yas Island Formula 2 round
Previous round: 2015 Sochi GP2 Series round	Sochi Formula 2 round	Next round: 2019 Sochi Formula 2 round
