= 2018 Budapest Formula 2 round =

(Hungary) 2018 Hungaroring Formula 2 round
Round details
- Round 8 of 12 in the 2018 FIA Formula 2 Championship.
- Layout of the Hungaroring
- Location: Hungaroring, Mogyoród, Hungary
- Course: Permanent racing facility 4.381 km (2.722 mi)

Feature race
- Date: 28 July 2018
- Laps: 34
Pole position
Driver	(Brazil) Sérgio Sette Câmara	Carlin
Time	1:27.400	
Podium
First	(Netherlands) Nyck de Vries	Pertamina Prema Theodore Racing
Second	(United Kingdom) Lando Norris	DAMS
Third	(Italy) Antonio Fuoco	Charouz Racing System
Fastest lap
Driver	(Switzerland) Ralph Boschung	MP Motorsport
- Time: 1:32.473 (on lap 33)

Sprint race
- Date: 29 July 2018
- Laps: 28
Podium
First	(Thailand) Alexander Albon	DAMS
Second	(Italy) Luca Ghiotto	Campos Vexatec Racing
Third	(Brazil) Sérgio Sette Câmara	Carlin
Fastest lap
Driver	(Italy) Antonio Fuoco	Charouz Racing System
- Time: 1:31.889 (on lap 24)

The 2018 Hungaroring FIA Formula 2 round was a pair of motor races held on 28 and 29 July 2018 at the Hungaroring in Mogyoród, Hungary as part of the FIA Formula 2 Championship. It was the eighth round of the 2018 FIA Formula 2 Championship and was run in support of the 2018 Hungarian Grand Prix.

== Classification ==
=== Qualifying ===
Pos.	No.	Driver	Team	Time	Gap	Grid
1	18	(Brazil) Sérgio Sette Câmara	Carlin	1:27.400	–	1
2	7	(United Kingdom) Jack Aitken	ART Grand Prix	1:27.430	+0.030	2
3	4	(Netherlands) Nyck de Vries	Pertamina Prema Theodore Racing	1:27.631	+0.231	3
4	8	(United Kingdom) George Russell	ART Grand Prix	1:27.762	+0.362	4
5	14	(Italy) Luca Ghiotto	Campos Vexatec Racing	1:27.828	+0.428	5
6	19	(United Kingdom) Lando Norris	Carlin	1:27.864	+0.464	6
7	1	(Russia) Artem Markelov	Russian Time	1:27.957	+0.557	7
8	16	(India) Arjun Maini	Trident	1:27.958	+0.558	8
9	10	(Switzerland) Ralph Boschung	MP Motorsport	1:27.973	+0.573	9
10	20	(Switzerland) Louis Delétraz	Charouz Racing System	1:28.032	+0.632	10
11	12	(Japan) Nirei Fukuzumi	BWT Arden	1:28.038	+0.638	11
12	21	(Italy) Antonio Fuoco	Charouz Racing System	1:28.073	+0.673	12
13	5	(Thailand) Alexander Albon	DAMS	1:28.107	+0.707	13
14	6	(Canada) Nicholas Latifi	DAMS	1:28.124	+0.724	14
15	11	(Germany) Maximilian Günther	BWT Arden	1:28.169	+0.769	15
16	15	(Israel) Roy Nissany	Campos Vexatec Racing	1:28.348	+0.948	16
17	17	(Italy) Alessio Lorandi	Trident	1:28.533	+1.133	17
18	3	(Indonesia) Sean Gelael	Pertamina Prema Theodore Racing	1:28.648	+1.248	18
19	9	(Spain) Roberto Merhi	MP Motorsport	1:28.724	+1.324	19
20	2	(Japan) Tadasuke Makino	Russian Time	1:28.750	+1.350	20

=== Feature race ===
Pos.	No.	Driver	Team	Laps	Time/Retired	Grid	Points
1	4	(Netherlands) Nyck de Vries	Pertamina Prema Theodore Racing	34	1:00:16.996	3	25 (2)
2	19	(United Kingdom) Lando Norris	Carlin	34	+16.508	6	18
3	21	(Italy) Antonio Fuoco	Charouz Racing System	34	+20.752	12	15
4	7	(United Kingdom) Jack Aitken	ART Grand Prix	34	+21.805	2	12
5	5	(Thailand) Alexander Albon	DAMS	34	+23.077	13	10
6	14	(Italy) Luca Ghiotto	Campos Vexatec Racing	34	+28.696	5	8
7	18	(Brazil) Sérgio Sette Câmara	Carlin	34	+29.099^{1}	1	6 (4)
8	1	(Russia) Artem Markelov	Russian Time	34	+35.594	7	4
9	2	(Japan) Tadasuke Makino	Russian Time	34	+36.304	20	2
10	12	(Japan) Nirei Fukuzumi	BWT Arden	34	+37.114	11	1
11	9	(Spain) Roberto Merhi	MP Motorsport	34	+37.983	19	
12	16	(India) Arjun Maini	Trident	34	+38.336	8	
13	3	(Indonesia) Sean Gelael	Pertamina Prema Theodore Racing	34	+39.120	18	
14	17	(Italy) Alessio Lorandi	Trident	34	+39.858	17	
15	15	(Israel) Roy Nissany	Campos Vexatec Racing	34	+48.072	16	
16	11	(Germany) Maximilian Günther	BWT Arden	34	+53.241	15	
17	20	(Switzerland) Louis Delétraz	Charouz Racing System	34	+1:13.696	10	
18	10	(Switzerland) Ralph Boschung	MP Motorsport	33	+1 lap	9	
DNF	6	(Canada) Nicholas Latifi	DAMS	29	Power loss	14	
DNF	8	(United Kingdom) George Russell	ART Grand Prix	11	Clutch	PL^{2}	
Fastest lap: Ralph Boschung (MP Motorsport) 1:32.473 (on lap 33)^{3}

Notes

- ^1 – Sérgio Sette Câmara had ten seconds added to his race time for causing contact with Antonio Fuoco.
- ^2 – George Russell started from pit lane due to clutch problem.
- ^3 – Ralph Boschung set the fastest lap in the race but because he finished outside the top 10, the two bonus points for fastest lap went to Nyck de Vries as he set the fastest lap inside the top 10 finishers.

=== Sprint race ===
Pos.	No.	Driver	Team	Laps	Time/Retired	Grid	Points
1	5	(Thailand) Alexander Albon	DAMS	28	44:47.130	4	15
2	14	(Italy) Luca Ghiotto	Campos Vexatec Racing	28	+9.465	3	12 (2)
3	18	(Brazil) Sérgio Sette Câmara	Carlin	28	+11.371	2	10
4	19	(United Kingdom) Lando Norris	Carlin	28	+13.638	7	8
5	9	(Spain) Roberto Merhi	MP Motorsport	28	+28.210	11	6
6	12	(Japan) Nirei Fukuzumi	BWT Arden	28	+34.144	10	4
7	4	(Netherlands) Nyck de Vries	Pertamina Prema Theodore Racing	28	+34.145	8	2
8	8	(United Kingdom) George Russell	ART Grand Prix	28	+36.586	20	1
9	20	(Switzerland) Louis Delétraz	Charouz Racing System	28	+37.140	17	
10	7	(United Kingdom) Jack Aitken	ART Grand Prix	28	+38.976	5	
11	3	(Indonesia) Sean Gelael	Pertamina Prema Theodore Racing	28	+40.963	13	
12	2	(Japan) Tadasuke Makino	Russian Time	28	+41.535	9	
13	1	(Russia) Artem Markelov	Russian Time	28	+52.230	1	
14	16	(India) Arjun Maini	Trident	28	+52.379	12	
15	15	(Israel) Roy Nissany	Campos Vexatec Racing	28	+1:00.932	15	
16	6	(Canada) Nicholas Latifi	DAMS	28	+1:17.184	19	
17	21	(Italy) Antonio Fuoco	Charouz Racing System	27	+1 lap	6	
DNF	11	(Germany) Maximilian Günther	BWT Arden	17	Gearbox	16	
DNF	17	(Italy) Alessio Lorandi	Trident	0	Collision	14	
DNF	10	(Switzerland) Ralph Boschung	MP Motorsport	0	Collision	18	
Fastest lap: Antonio Fuoco (Charouz Racing System) 1:31.889 (on lap 24)^{1}

Notes

- ^1 – Antonio Fuoco set the fastest lap in the race but because he finished outside the top 10, the two bonus points for fastest lap went to Luca Ghiotto as he set the fastest lap inside the top 10 finishers.

== Championship standings after the round ==
Drivers' Championship standings

	Pos.	Driver	Points
	1	(United Kingdom) George Russell	171
	2	(United Kingdom) Lando Norris	159
	3	(Thailand) Alexander Albon	141
	4	(Russia) Artem Markelov	114
2	5	(Netherlands) Nyck de Vries	114

Teams' Championship standings

	Pos.	Team	Points
1	1	(United Kingdom) Carlin	265
1	2	(France) ART Grand Prix	232
1	3	(France) DAMS	175
1	4	(Czech Republic) Charouz Racing System	174
1	5	(Italy) Pertamina Prema Theodore Racing	143

== See also ==
- 2018 Hungarian Grand Prix
- 2018 Budapest GP3 Series round

Previous round: 2018 Silverstone Formula 2 round	FIA Formula 2 Championship; 2018 season	Next round: 2018 Spa-Francorchamps Formula 2 round
Previous round: 2017 Budapest Formula 2 round	Budapest Formula 2 round	Next round: 2019 Budapest Formula 2 round
