= 2017 Silverstone Formula 2 round =

(United Kingdom) 2017 Silverstone Formula 2 round
Round details
- Round 6 of 11 in the 2017 FIA Formula 2 Championship.
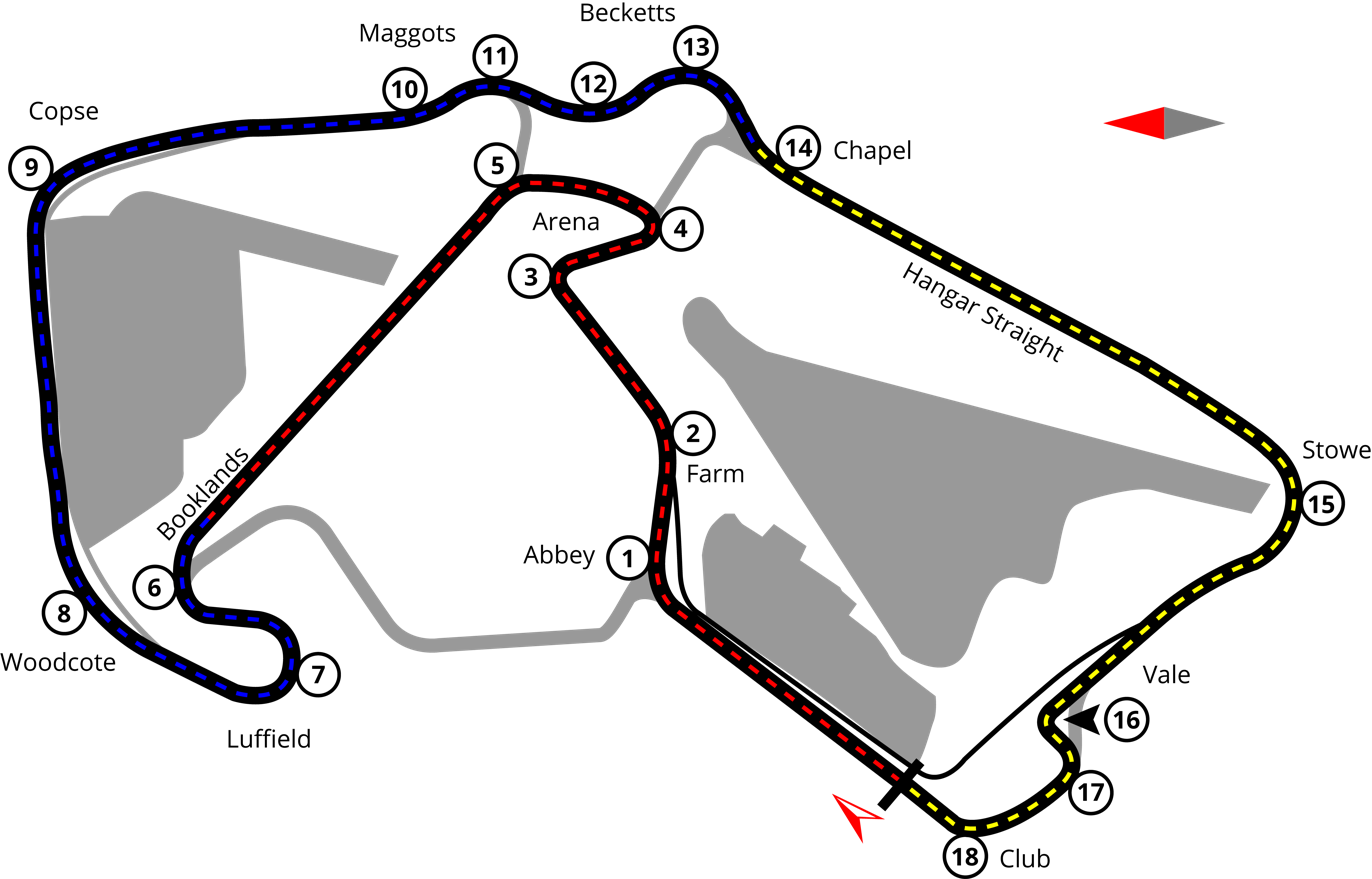
- Layout of the Silverstone Circuit
- Location: Silverstone Circuit, Silverstone, United Kingdom
- Course: Permanent racing facility 5.891 km (3.660 mi)

Feature race
- Date: 15 July 2017
- Laps: 28
Pole position
Driver	(Monaco) Charles Leclerc	Prema Racing
Time	1:38.427	
Podium
First	(Monaco) Charles Leclerc	Prema Racing
Second	(France) Norman Nato	Arden International
Third	(United Kingdom) Oliver Rowland	DAMS
Fastest lap
Driver	(Japan) Nobuharu Matsushita	ART Grand Prix
- Time: 1:42.512 (on lap 23)

Sprint race
- Date: 16 July 2017
- Laps: 21
Podium
First	(Canada) Nicholas Latifi	DAMS
Second	(Italy) Luca Ghiotto	Russian Time
Third	(Russia) Artem Markelov	Russian Time
Fastest lap
Driver	(Monaco) Charles Leclerc	Prema Racing
- Time: 1:43.219 (on lap 13)

The 2017 Silverstone FIA Formula 2 round was a pair of motor races held on 15 and 16 July 2017 at the Silverstone Circuit in Silverstone, United Kingdom as part of the FIA Formula 2 Championship. It was the sixth round of the 2017 FIA Formula 2 Championship and was run in support of the 2017 British Grand Prix.

== Classifications ==
=== Qualifying ===
Pos.	No.	Driver	Team	Time	Gap	Grid
1	1	(Monaco) Charles Leclerc	Prema Racing	1:38.427	—	1
2	9	(United Kingdom) Oliver Rowland	DAMS	1:38.885	+0.458	2
3	20	(France) Norman Nato	Arden International	1:38.906	+0.479	3
4	15	(United Kingdom) Jordan King	MP Motorsport	1:38.988	+0.561	4
5	6	(Russia) Artem Markelov	Russian Time	1:39.062	+0.635	5
6	10	(Canada) Nicholas Latifi	DAMS	1:39.138	+0.711	6
7	19	(Spain) Sergio Canamasas	Rapax	1:39.368	+0.941	7
8	7	(Japan) Nobuharu Matsushita	ART Grand Prix	1:39.405	+0.978	8
9	14	(Brazil) Sérgio Sette Câmara	MP Motorsport	1:39.413	+0.986	9
10	8	(Thailand) Alexander Albon	ART Grand Prix	1:39.566	+1.139	13
11	18	(Netherlands) Nyck de Vries	Rapax	1:39.594	+1.167	10
12	4	(Sweden) Gustav Malja	Racing Engineering	1:39.879	+1.452	11
13	5	(Italy) Luca Ghiotto	Russian Time	1:39.959	+1.532	12
14	3	(Switzerland) Louis Delétraz	Racing Engineering	1:39.966	+1.539	14
15	17	(United Kingdom) Callum Ilott	Trident	1:39.996	+1.569	15
16	11	(Switzerland) Ralph Boschung	Campos Racing	1:40.394	+1.967	16
17	12	(Romania) Robert Vișoiu	Campos Racing	1:40.412	+1.985	20
18	16	(Malaysia) Nabil Jeffri	Trident	1:40.454	+2.027	17
19	21	(Indonesia) Sean Gelael	Arden International	1:40.478	+2.051	18
20	2	(Italy) Antonio Fuoco	Prema Racing	1:40.568	+2.141	19

=== Feature Race ===
Pos.	No.	Driver	Team	Laps	Time/Retired	Grid	Points
1	1	(Monaco) Charles Leclerc	Prema Racing	28	49:23.075	1	25 (4)
2	20	(France) Norman Nato	Arden International	28	+8.866	3	18
3	9	(United Kingdom) Oliver Rowland	DAMS	28	+9.605	2	15
4	6	(Russia) Artem Markelov	Russian Time	28	+17.743	5	12
5	19	(Spain) Sergio Canamasas	Rapax	28	+18.715	7	10
6	5	(Italy) Luca Ghiotto	Russian Time	28	+24.284	12	8
7	15	(United Kingdom) Jordan King	MP Motorsport	28	+26.498	4	6
8	10	(Canada) Nicholas Latifi	DAMS	28	+27.805	6	4
9	21	(Indonesia) Sean Gelael	Arden International	28	+28.904	18	2
10	7	(Japan) Nobuharu Matsushita	ART Grand Prix	28	+34.560	8	1 (2)
11	11	(Switzerland) Ralph Boschung	Campos Racing	28	+44.764	16	
12	3	(Switzerland) Louis Delétraz	Racing Engineering	28	+46.536	14	
13	14	(Brazil) Sérgio Sette Câmara	MP Motorsport	28	+47.050	9	
14	4	(Sweden) Gustav Malja	Racing Engineering	28	+50.673	11	
15	16	(Malaysia) Nabil Jeffri	Trident	28	+56.457	17	
16	2	(Italy) Antonio Fuoco	Prema Racing	28	+1:01.355	19	
17	12	(Romania) Robert Vișoiu	Campos Racing	28	+1:09.543	20	
18	8	(Thailand) Alexander Albon	ART Grand Prix	28	+1:12.549	13	
19	17	(United Kingdom) Callum Ilott	Trident	27	+1 lap	15	
DNS	18	(Netherlands) Nyck de Vries	Rapax	0	Fuel system	10	
Fastest lap: (Japan) Nobuharu Matsushita – 1:42.512 (on lap 23)

=== Sprint Race ===
Pos.	No.	Driver	Team	Laps	Time/Retired	Grid	Points
1	10	(Canada) Nicholas Latifi	DAMS	21	37:17.053	1	15
2	5	(Italy) Luca Ghiotto	Russian Time	21	+1.717	3	12
3	6	(Russia) Artem Markelov	Russian Time	21	+5.300	5	10
4	19	(Spain) Sergio Canamasas	Rapax	21	+7.698	4	8
5	1	(Monaco) Charles Leclerc	Prema Racing	21	+7.943	8	6 (2)
6	20	(France) Norman Nato	Arden International	21	+8.279	7	4
7	18	(Netherlands) Nyck de Vries	Rapax	21	+8.801	20	2
8	7	(Japan) Nobuharu Matsushita	ART Grand Prix	21	+9.484	10	1
9	4	(Sweden) Gustav Malja	Racing Engineering	21	+10.618	14	
10	8	(Thailand) Alexander Albon	ART Grand Prix	21	+13.262	18	
11	12	(Romania) Robert Vișoiu	Campos Racing	21	+13.535	17	
12	2	(Italy) Antonio Fuoco	Prema Racing	21	+13.825	16	
13	3	(Switzerland) Louis Delétraz	Racing Engineering	21	+14.386	12	
14	17	(United Kingdom) Callum Ilott	Trident	21	+14.665	19	
15	14	(Brazil) Sérgio Sette Câmara	MP Motorsport	21	+14.925	13	
16	21	(Indonesia) Sean Gelael	Arden International	21	+15.871	9	
17	9	(United Kingdom) Oliver Rowland	DAMS	21	+32.263	6	
18	16	(Malaysia) Nabil Jeffri	Trident	21	+45.918	15	
DNF	11	(Switzerland) Ralph Boschung	Campos Racing	17	Accident	11	
DNF	15	(United Kingdom) Jordan King	MP Motorsport	1	Hydraulics	2	
Fastest lap: (Monaco) Charles Leclerc – 1:43.219 (on lap 13)

== Championship standings after the round ==
Drivers' Championship standings

	Pos.	Driver	Points
	1	(Monaco) Charles Leclerc	188
1	2	(Russia) Artem Markelov	121
1	3	(United Kingdom) Oliver Rowland	117
	4	(Canada) Nicholas Latifi	91
	5	(Italy) Luca Ghiotto	86

Teams' Championship standings

Pos.	Team	Points
1	(Italy) Prema Racing	211
2	(France) DAMS	208
3	(Russia) Russian Time	207
4	(France) ART Grand Prix	134
5	(Italy) Rapax	81

- Note: Only the top five positions are included for both sets of standings.

== See also ==
- 2017 British Grand Prix
- 2017 Silverstone GP3 Series round

Previous round: 2017 Spielberg Formula 2 round	FIA Formula 2 Championship; 2017 season	Next round: 2017 Budapest Formula 2 round
Previous round: 2016 Silverstone GP2 Series round	Silverstone Formula 2 round	Next round: 2018 Silverstone Formula 2 round
