= 2016 Monza GP2 Series round =

Motor racing competition

(Italy) 2016 Monza GP2 round
Round details
- Round 9 of 11 rounds in the 2016 GP2 Series
- Layout of the Autodromo Nazionale Monza
- Location: Autodromo Nazionale Monza, Monza, Italy
- Course: Permanent racing facility 5.793 km (3.6 mi)

GP2 Series

Feature race
- Date: 3 September 2016
- Laps: 30

Pole position
Driver	(France) Pierre Gasly	Prema Racing
- Time: 1:31.199

Podium
First	(Italy) Antonio Giovinazzi	Prema Racing
Second	(Italy) Raffaele Marciello	Russian Time
Third	(Sweden) Gustav Malja	Rapax

Fastest lap
Driver	(Italy) Luca Ghiotto	Trident
- Time: 1:33.980 (on lap 27)

Sprint race
- Date: 4 September 2016
- Laps: 21

Podium
First	(France) Norman Nato	Racing Engineering
Second	(France) Pierre Gasly	Prema Racing
Third	(Italy) Antonio Giovinazzi	Prema Racing

Fastest lap
Driver	(Russia) Artem Markelov	Russian Time
- Time: 1:33.727 (on lap 5)

The 2016 Monza GP2 Series round was a GP2 Series motor race held on 3 and 4 September 2016 at the Autodromo Nazionale Monza in Italy. It was the ninth round of the 2016 GP2 Series. The race weekend supported the 2016 Italian Grand Prix.

== Report ==
=== Qualifying ===
Pierre Gasly took another pole with team-mate Antonio Giovinazzi in a close second to continue the dominant form of the Prema team. However, due to irregularities in the tyre pressures, Giovinazzi was demoted toward the end of the grid, elevating third place Artem Markelov to the front row. The second row would consist of Arthur Pic and Mitch Evans.

Pos.	No.	Driver	Team	Time	Gap	Grid
1	21	(France) Pierre Gasly	Prema Racing	1:31.199	–	1
EX	20	(Italy) Antonio Giovinazzi	Prema Racing	1:31.253	+0.054	21^{1}
2	10	(Russia) Artem Markelov	Russian Time	1:31.548	+0.349	2
3	12	(France) Arthur Pic	Rapax	1:31.617	+0.418	3
4	7	(New Zealand) Mitch Evans	Campos Racing	1:31.666	+0.467	4
5	4	(United Kingdom) Jordan King	Racing Engineering	1:31.710	+0.511	5
6	5	(United Kingdom) Alex Lynn	DAMS	1:31.775	+0.576	6
EX	24	(Malaysia) Nabil Jeffri	Arden International	1:31.795	+0.596	22^{2}
7	2	(Russia) Sergey Sirotkin	ART Grand Prix	1:31.816	+0.617	7
8	3	(France) Norman Nato	Racing Engineering	1:31.846	+0.646	8
9	15	(Italy) Luca Ghiotto	Trident	1:31.855	+0.656	9
10	22	(United Kingdom) Oliver Rowland	MP Motorsport	1:31.864	+0.665	10
11	9	(Italy) Raffaele Marciello	Russian Time	1:31.986	+0.787	11
12	1	(Japan) Nobuharu Matsushita	ART Grand Prix	1:32.037	+0.838	12
13	19	(Germany) Marvin Kirchhöfer	Carlin	1:32.172	+0.973	13
14	6	(Canada) Nicholas Latifi	DAMS	1:32.192	+0.993	14
15	18	(Spain) Sergio Canamasas	Carlin	1:32.196	+0.997	15
16	11	(Sweden) Gustav Malja	Rapax	1:32.215	+1.016	16
17	8	(Indonesia) Sean Gelael	Campos Racing	1:32.481	+1.282	17
18	23	(Netherlands) Daniel de Jong	MP Motorsport	1:33.071	+1.872	18
19	14	(Indonesia) Philo Paz Armand	Trident	1:33.269	+2.070	19
20	25	(Sweden) Jimmy Eriksson	Arden International	1:33.929	+2.730	20

Notes

1. – Giovinazzi and Jeffri were excluded from qualifying after being deemed to run illegal tyre pressures during the session.

=== Feature Race ===
Antonio Giovinazzi won what was a chaotic race after a mid-race accident shuffled the pack and elevated himself, Raffaele Marciello and Gustav Malja up the pack. On lap 15, an Arthur Pic collided with Sergio Canamasas through the second Lesmo. The pair were racing side-by-side and after barely leaving enough space through the corner, Pic lost control through the corner and counter-steered straight into Canamasas' rear wheel, sending him into a roll. Pic expressed frustration with the incident, although stewards later deemed him to be at fault for the incident - handing him a three-place grid penalty as a consequence. The safety car put Gasly from a comfortable first to fourth and now behind drivers on brand-new tyres. With four laps to go, it was Marciello leading from Giovinazzi and Malja. On the final lap, Giovinazzi benefited from the use of DRS and passed Marciello to take a home victory from Marciello (thereby making it an Italian one-two) and Malja. As well as this, Luca Ghiotto achieved the fastest lap, completing a successful race for the Italians on home soil.

Pos.	No.	Driver	Team	Laps	Time/Retired	Grid	Points
1	20	(Italy) Antonio Giovinazzi	Prema Racing	30	52:28.474	21	25
2	9	(Italy) Raffaele Marciello	Russian Time	30	+1.457	11	18
3	11	(Sweden) Gustav Malja	Rapax	30	+1.988	16	15
4	21	(France) Pierre Gasly	Prema Racing	30	+2.294	1	12 (4)
5	3	(France) Norman Nato	Racing Engineering	30	+2.809	8	10
6	15	(Italy) Luca Ghiotto	Trident	30	+2.823	9	8 (2)
7	4	(United Kingdom) Jordan King	Racing Engineering	30	+3.896	5	6
8	7	(New Zealand) Mitch Evans	Campos Racing	30	+6.311	4	4
9	22	(United Kingdom) Oliver Rowland	MP Motorsport	30	+7.898	10	2
10	10	(Russia) Artem Markelov	Russian Time	30	+9.416	2	1
11	1	(Japan) Nobuharu Matsushita	ART Grand Prix	30	+10.277	12	
12	5	(United Kingdom) Alex Lynn	DAMS	30	+11.013	6	
13	24	(Malaysia) Nabil Jeffri	Arden International	30	+17.807	22	
14	2	(Russia) Sergey Sirotkin	ART Grand Prix	30	+18.524	7	
15	25	(Sweden) Jimmy Eriksson	Arden International	30	+18.109^{1}	20	
16	6	(Canada) Nicholas Latifi	DAMS	30	+22.201	14	
17	23	(Netherlands) Daniel de Jong	MP Motorsport	30	+22.555	18	
18	19	(Germany) Marvin Kirchhöfer	Carlin	30	+22.833	13	
19	14	(Indonesia) Philo Paz Armand	Trident	30	+23.482	19	
Ret	18	(Spain) Sergio Canamasas	Carlin	15	Collision	15	
Ret	12	(France) Arthur Pic	Rapax	15	Collision	3	
DSQ	8	(Indonesia) Sean Gelael	Campos Racing	29	Disqualified^{2}	17	
Fastest lap: (Italy) Luca Ghiotto (Trident) – 1:33.980 (on lap 27)

Notes

1. – Eriksson was given a five-second penalty after having been deemed to have forced another driver off the circuit.
2. – Gelael was initially given a ten-second stop-go penalty for failing to slow under double-yellow flags, after setting his fastest sector times under the Safety Car period. After crossing the start/finish line more than twice without serving the penalty, he was disqualified from the race.

=== Sprint Race ===
Norman Nato took his first win since the opening race of the championship, beating the Prema Racing pair of Gasly and Giovinazzi with a comfortable margin.

Pos.	No.	Driver	Team	Laps	Time/Retired	Grid	Points
1	3	(France) Norman Nato	Racing Engineering	21	33:51.821	4	15
2	21	(France) Pierre Gasly	Prema Racing	21	+4.312	5	12
3	20	(Italy) Antonio Giovinazzi	Prema Racing	21	+8.495	8	10
4	4	(United Kingdom) Jordan King	Racing Engineering	21	+12.775	2	8
5	5	(United Kingdom) Alex Lynn	DAMS	21	+13.576	12	6
6	1	(Japan) Nobuharu Matsushita	ART Grand Prix	21	+13.586	11	4
7	11	(Sweden) Gustav Malja	Rapax	21	+21.526	6	2
8	19	(Germany) Marvin Kirchhöfer	Carlin	21	+22.566	17	1
9	22	(United Kingdom) Oliver Rowland	MP Motorsport	21	+29.225	9	
10	10	(Russia) Artem Markelov	Russian Time	21	+32.813^{1}	10	(2)
11	12	(France) Arthur Pic	Rapax	21	+34.192	21	
12	24	(Malaysia) Nabil Jeffri	Arden International	21	+34.194	13	
13	18	(Spain) Sergio Canamasas	Carlin	21	+36.845	20	
14	9	(Italy) Raffaele Marciello	Russian Time	21	+40.665	7	
15	6	(Canada) Nicholas Latifi	DAMS	21	+41.503^{1}	16	
16	8	(Indonesia) Sean Gelael	Campos Racing	21	+44.059	22	
17	14	(Indonesia) Philo Paz Armand	Trident	21	+48.628	19	
18	25	(Sweden) Jimmy Eriksson	Arden International	20	+1 Lap	15	
19	23	(Netherlands) Daniel de Jong	MP Motorsport	20	+1 Lap	17	
Ret	2	(Russia) Sergey Sirotkin	ART Grand Prix	6	Retired	14	
Ret	7	(New Zealand) Mitch Evans	Campos Racing	0	Collision	1	
Ret	15	(Italy) Luca Ghiotto	Trident	0	Collision	3	
Fastest lap: (Russia) Artem Markelov (Russian Time) – 1:33.727 (on lap 5)

1. – Markelov and Latifi were penalised after it was deemed that neither driver slowed sufficiently for the Virtual Safety Car. They were each given the equivalent of a drive-through-penalty (20 seconds) applied to their race times.

== Standings after the round ==
Drivers' Championship standings

	Pos.	Driver	Points
	1	(France) Pierre Gasly	172
	2	(Italy) Antonio Giovinazzi	164
	3	(Italy) Raffaele Marciello	138
	4	(Russia) Sergey Sirotkin	115
1	5	(United Kingdom) Jordan King	112

Teams' Championship standings

	Pos.	Team	Points
	1	(Italy) Prema Racing	336
	2	(Russia) Russian Time	220
	3	(Spain) Racing Engineering	219
	4	(France) ART Grand Prix	177
1	5	(France) DAMS	114

- Note: Only the top five positions are included for both sets of standings.

== See also ==
- 2016 Italian Grand Prix
- 2016 Monza GP3 Series round

Previous round: 2016 Spa-Francorchamps GP2 Series round	GP2 Series; 2016 season	Next round: 2016 Sepang GP2 Series round
Previous round: 2015 Monza GP2 Series round	Monza GP2 round	Next round: 2017 Monza Formula 2 round
