= 2017 Jerez Formula 2 round =

(Spain) 2017 Jerez Formula 2 round
Round details
- Round 10 of 11 in the 2017 FIA Formula 2 Championship.
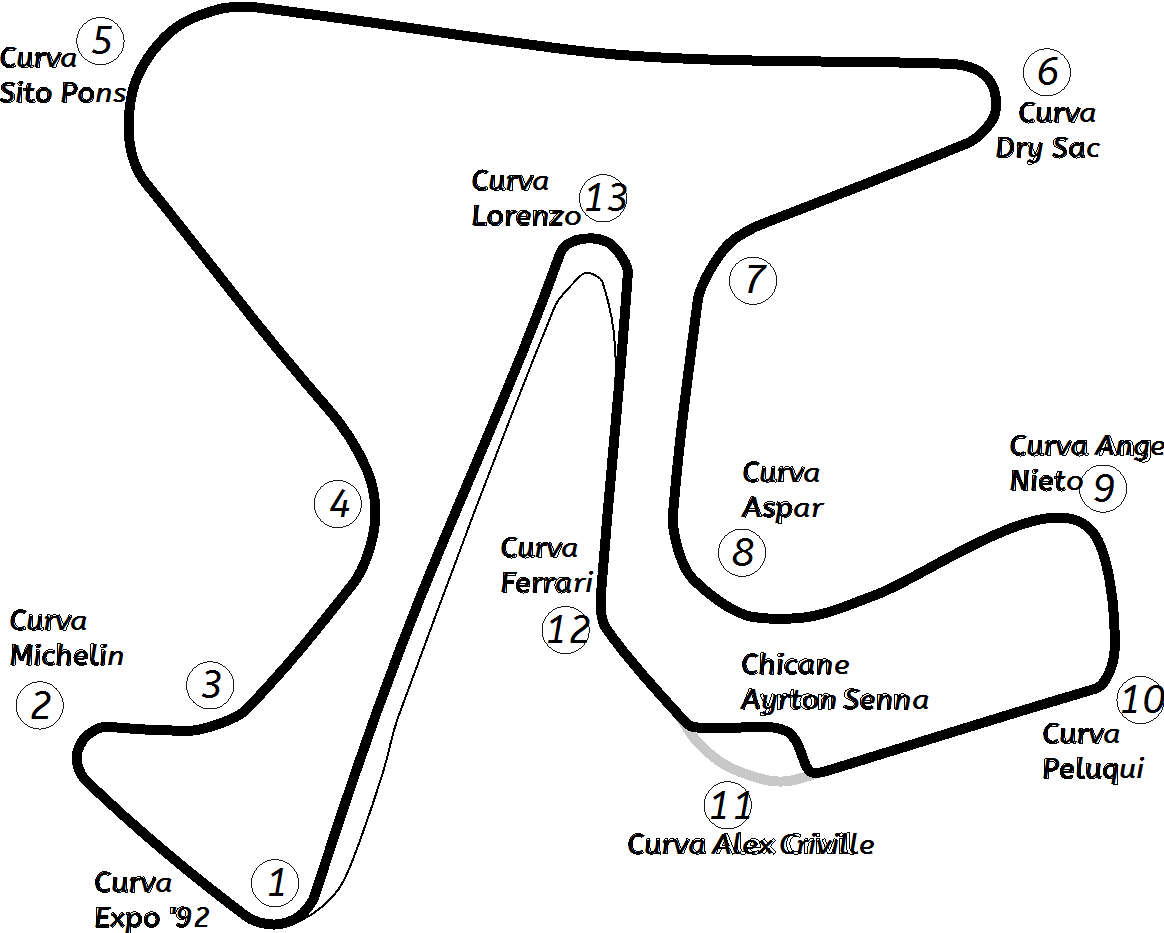
- Layout of the Circuito de Jerez
- Location: Circuito de Jerez, Jerez de la Frontera, Spain
- Course: Permanent racing facility 4.428 km (2.751 mi)

Feature race
- Date: 7 October 2017
- Laps: 39
Pole position
Driver	(Monaco) Charles Leclerc	Prema Racing
Time	1:24.682	
Podium
First	(Monaco) Charles Leclerc	Prema Racing
Second	(United Kingdom) Oliver Rowland	DAMS
Third	(Italy) Antonio Fuoco	Prema Racing
Fastest lap
Driver	(United Kingdom) Oliver Rowland	DAMS
- Time: 1:29.906 (on lap 22)

Sprint race
- Date: 8 October 2017
- Laps: 28
Podium
First	(Russia) Artem Markelov	Russian Time
Second	(Canada) Nicholas Latifi	DAMS
Third	(United Kingdom) Oliver Rowland	DAMS
Fastest lap
Driver	(Netherlands) Nyck de Vries	Racing Engineering
- Time: 1:29.296 (on lap 22)

The 2017 Jerez FIA Formula 2 round was a pair of motor races held on 7 and 8 October 2017 at the Circuito de Jerez in Jerez de la Frontera, Spain as part of the FIA Formula 2 Championship. It was the tenth and penultimate round of the 2017 FIA Formula 2 Championship and the only ever in the Championship's history which did not support a Formula One weekend.

After a disappointing round in Monza for championship leader Charles Leclerc with a total of 0 points to his name, the Monégasque driver took yet another pole position and prematurely clinched the championship title by winning his sixth race of the season with three races to spare. With only one weekend to go, Leclerc was leading the championship with an unassailable lead by 60 points over current runner-up Oliver Rowland.

As of 2022, Leclerc holds the record for the most pole positions in a Formula 2 season with eight.

== Classifications ==
=== Qualifying ===
Pos.	No.	Driver	Team	Time	Gap	Grid
1	1	(Monaco) Charles Leclerc	Prema Racing	1:24.682	—	1
2	5	(Italy) Luca Ghiotto	Russian Time	1:24.942	+0.260	2
3	14	(Brazil) Sérgio Sette Câmara	MP Motorsport	1:25.257	+0.575	3
4	9	(United Kingdom) Oliver Rowland	DAMS	1:25.316	+0.634	4
5	6	(Russia) Artem Markelov	Russian Time	1:25.422	+0.740	5
6	8	(Thailand) Alexander Albon	ART Grand Prix	1:25.426	+0.744	6
7	7	(Japan) Nobuharu Matsushita	ART Grand Prix	1:25.450	+0.768	7
8	3	(Netherlands) Nyck de Vries	Racing Engineering	1:25.470	+0.788	8
9	10	(Canada) Nicholas Latifi	DAMS	1:25.477	+0.795	9
10	20	(France) Norman Nato	Arden International	1:25.583	+0.901	10
11	12	(Japan) Álex Palou	Campos Racing	1:25.600	+0.918	11
12	18	(Switzerland) Louis Delétraz	Rapax	1:25.627	+0.945	12
13	17	(United States) Santino Ferrucci	Trident	1:25.632	+0.950	13
14	15	(United Kingdom) Jordan King	MP Motorsport	1:25.653	+0.971	14
15	2	(Italy) Antonio Fuoco	Prema Racing	1:25.739	+1.057	15
16	4	(Sweden) Gustav Malja	Racing Engineering	1:25.916	+1.234	16
17	19	(Austria) René Binder	Rapax	1:26.121	+1.439	17
18	16	(Malaysia) Nabil Jeffri	Trident	1:26.148	+1.466	18
19	21	(Indonesia) Sean Gelael	Arden International	1:26.163	+1.481	19
20	11	(Switzerland) Ralph Boschung	Campos Racing	1:26.647	+1.965	20

=== Feature Race ===
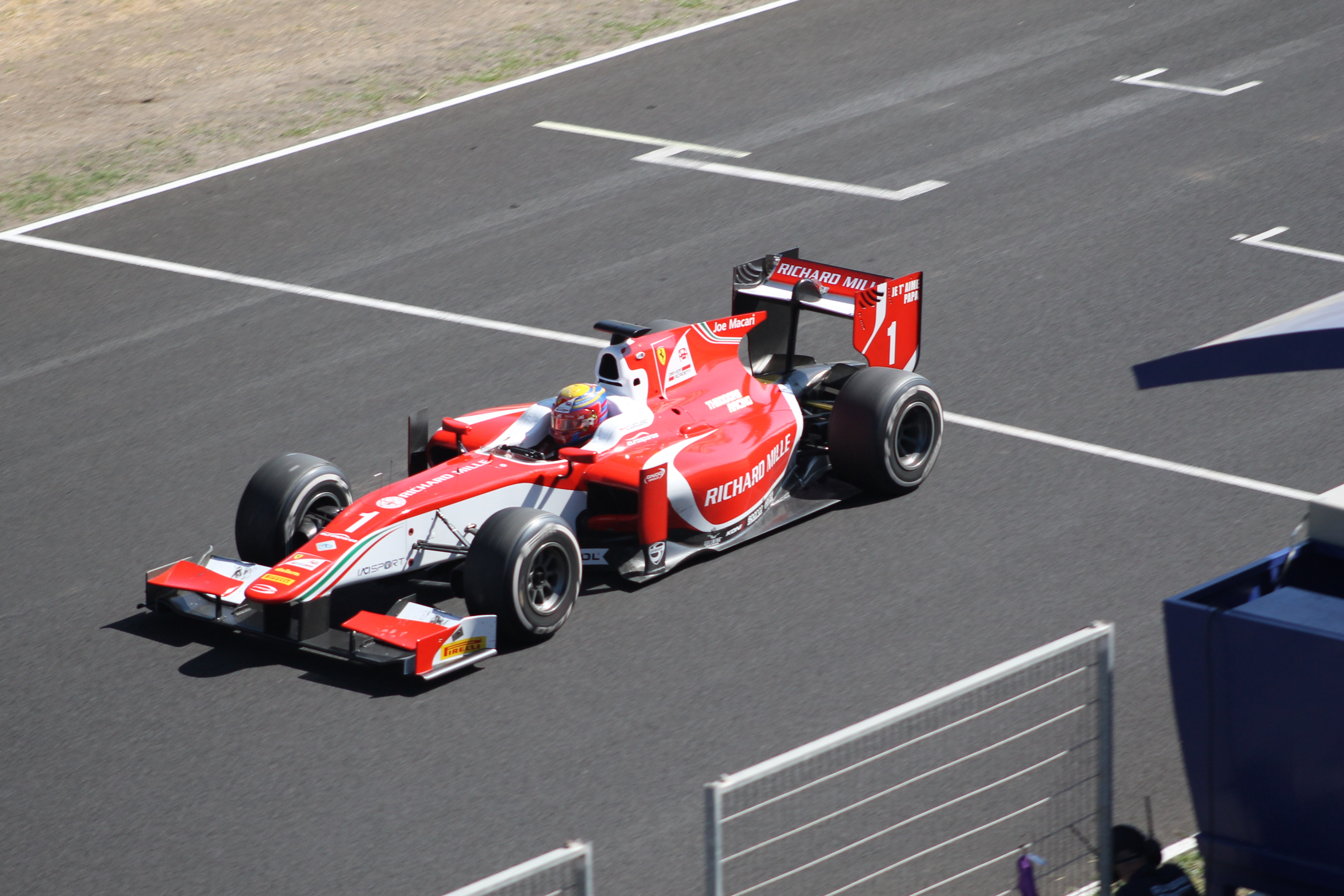
Charles Leclerc leading the Feature Race.

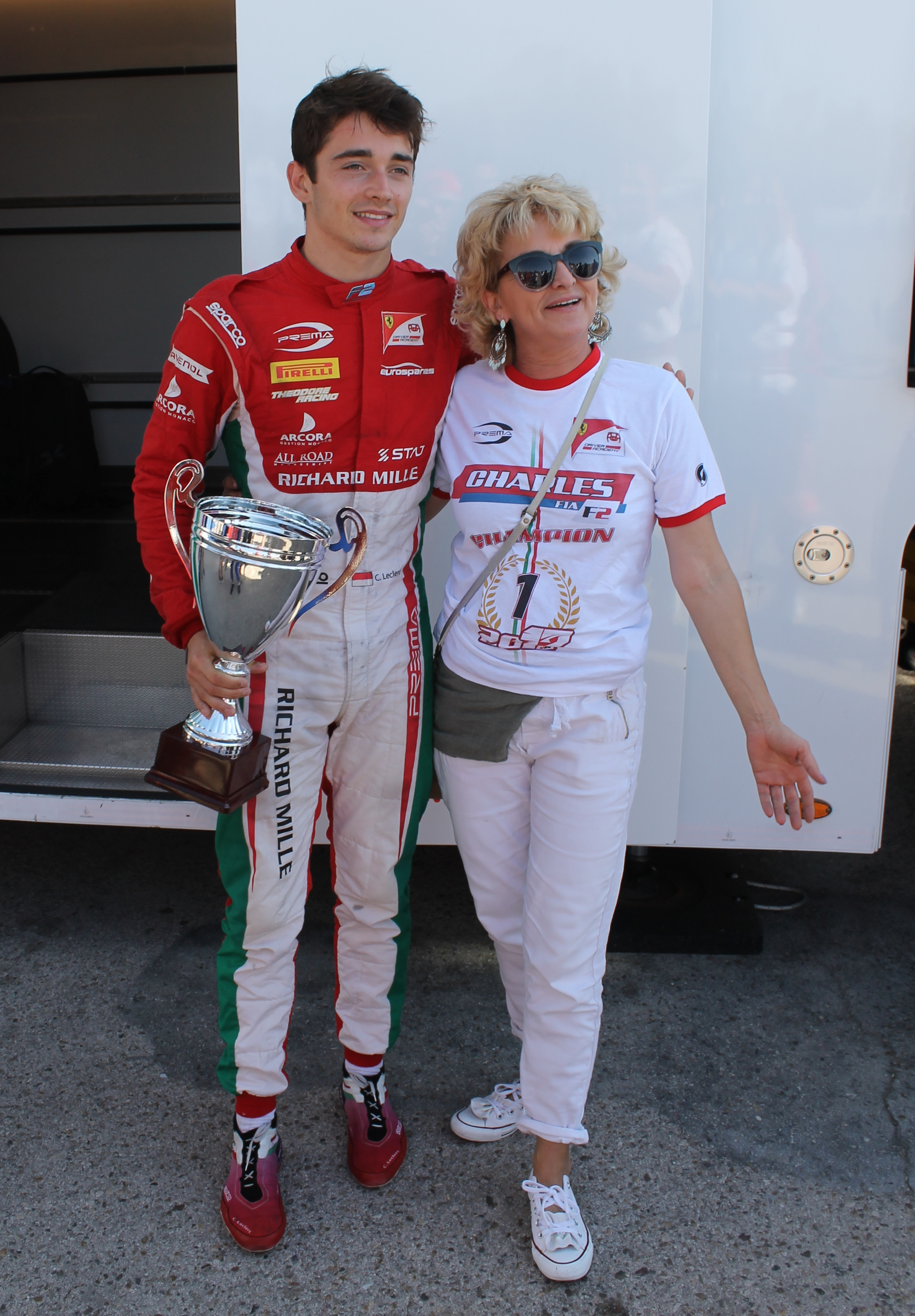
Leclerc with his mother Pascale after winning the Formula 2 championship.

Pos.	No.	Driver	Team	Laps	Time/Retired	Grid	Points
1	1	(Monaco) Charles Leclerc	Prema Racing	39	1:01:31.999	1	25 (4)
2	9	(United Kingdom) Oliver Rowland	DAMS	39	+0.230	4	18 (2)
3	2	(Italy) Antonio Fuoco	Prema Racing	39	+0.917	15	15
4	10	(Canada) Nicholas Latifi	DAMS	39	+1.236	9	12
5	6	(Russia) Artem Markelov	Russian Time	39	+2.685	5	10
6	15	(United Kingdom) Jordan King	MP Motorsport	39	+6.744	14	8
7	5	(Italy) Luca Ghiotto	Russian Time	39	+8.017	2	6
8	12	(Japan) Álex Palou	Campos Racing	39	+8.262	11	4
9	16	(Malaysia) Nabil Jeffri	Trident	39	+14.483	18	2
10	14	(Brazil) Sérgio Sette Câmara	MP Motorsport	39	+16.226	3	1
11	20	(France) Norman Nato	Arden International	39	+16.256	10	
12	8	(Thailand) Alexander Albon	ART Grand Prix	39	+17.122	6	
13	3	(Netherlands) Nyck de Vries	Racing Engineering	39	+17.657	8	
14	4	(Sweden) Gustav Malja	Racing Engineering	39	+24.855	16	
15	19	(Austria) René Binder	Rapax	39	+26.942	17	
16	21	(Indonesia) Sean Gelael	Arden International	38	+1 lap	19	
17	18	(Switzerland) Louis Delétraz	Rapax	38	+1 lap	12	
18	7	(Japan) Nobuharu Matsushita	ART Grand Prix	38	+1 lap	7	
DNF	17	(United States) Santino Ferrucci	Trident	31	Accident	13	
DNF	11	(Switzerland) Ralph Boschung	Campos Racing	27	Brakes	20	
Fastest lap: (United Kingdom) Oliver Rowland (DAMS) – 1:29.906 (on lap 22)

=== Sprint Race ===
Pos.	No.	Driver	Team	Laps	Time/Retired	Grid	Points
1	6	(Russia) Artem Markelov	Russian Time	28	43:01.086	4	15
2	10	(Canada) Nicholas Latifi	DAMS	28	+11.840	5	12
3	9	(United Kingdom) Oliver Rowland	DAMS	28	+13.286	7	10
4	5	(Italy) Luca Ghiotto	Russian Time	28	+14.691	2	8
5	2	(Italy) Antonio Fuoco	Prema Racing	28	+16.497	6	6
6	3	(Netherlands) Nyck de Vries	Racing Engineering	28	+20.201	13	4 (2)
7	1	(Monaco) Charles Leclerc	Prema Racing	28	+20.510	8	2
8	12	(Japan) Álex Palou	Campos Racing	28	+25.027	1	1
9	8	(Thailand) Alexander Albon	ART Grand Prix	28	+25.613	12	
10	20	(France) Norman Nato	Arden International	28	+30.411	11	
11	7	(Japan) Nobuharu Matsushita	ART Grand Prix	28	+34.059	18	
12	18	(Switzerland) Louis Delétraz	Rapax	28	+38.074	17	
13	17	(United States) Santino Ferrucci	Trident	28	+44.257	19	
14	14	(Brazil) Sérgio Sette Câmara	MP Motorsport	28	+52.036	10	
15	16	(Malaysia) Nabil Jeffri	Trident	28	+52.395	9	
16	21	(Indonesia) Sean Gelael	Arden International	28	+52.516	16	
17	19	(Austria) René Binder	Rapax	28	+52.658	15	
18	4	(Sweden) Gustav Malja	Racing Engineering	28	+1:04.836	14	
19	11	(Switzerland) Ralph Boschung	Campos Racing	27	Brakes	20	
DNF	15	(United Kingdom) Jordan King	MP Motorsport	3	Gearbox	3	
Fastest lap: (Netherlands) Nyck de Vries (Racing Engineering) – 1:29.296 (on lap 22)

== Championship standings after the round ==
Drivers' Championship standings

Pos.	Driver	Points
1	(Monaco) Charles Leclerc	249
2	(United Kingdom) Oliver Rowland	189
3	(Russia) Artem Markelov	177
4	(Italy) Luca Ghiotto	164
5	(Canada) Nicholas Latifi	156

Teams' Championship standings

	Pos.	Team	Points
1	1	(Italy) Prema Racing	347
1	2	(France) DAMS	345
2	3	(Russia) Russian Time	341
	4	(France) ART Grand Prix	190
	5	(Italy) Rapax	136

- Note: Only the top five positions are included for both sets of standings.

== See also ==
- 2017 Jerez GP3 Series round

Previous round: 2017 Monza Formula 2 round	FIA Formula 2 Championship; 2017 season	Next round: 2017 Yas Island Formula 2 round
Previous round: 1997 International F3000 Jerez round	Jerez Formula 2 round	Next round: None
