= Igor Mazepa (motorsport) =

Russian racing driver and manager

- Born: Igor Vladimirovich Mazepa; 27 June 1973
- Died: 3 February 2014 (aged 40)

Igor Vladimirovich Mazepa (27 June 1973 – 3 February 2014) was a Russian racing driver and manager. He was the founder and team manager of Russian Time, a team that competed in the GP2 series and FIA Formula 2 Championship from 2013 to 2018.

Mazepa started his motorsports hobby at the age of 11 with karting after which he joined the car dealership. He has worked with the Russian ZIL factory team at the European Truck Championships after which he moved to the United States for seven years where he graduated from two universities while studying marketing. In 2008, Mazepa formed a karting team called Spartak Racing. The team has won two Russian karting championships in 2008 and 2009 in the (Rotax Max class).

In February 2014, Mazepa died of thrombosis, aged 40.
