= 2018 Monza Formula 2 round =

Motor racing competition

(Italy) 2018 Monza Formula 2 round
Round details
- Round 10 of 12 in the 2018 FIA Formula 2 Championship.
- Layout of the Autodromo Nazionale Monza
- Location: Autodromo Nazionale Monza, Monza, Italy
- Course: Permanent racing facility 5.793 km (3.600 mi)

Feature race
- Date: 1 September 2018
- Laps: 30
Pole position
Driver	(United Kingdom) George Russell	ART Grand Prix
Time	1:31.546	
Podium
First	(Japan) Tadasuke Makino	Russian Time
Second	(Russia) Artem Markelov	ART Grand Prix
Third	(Thailand) Alexander Albon	DAMS
Fastest lap
Driver	(Brazil) Sérgio Sette Câmara	Carlin
- Time: 1:35.296 (on lap 30)

Sprint race
- Date: 2 September 2018
- Laps: 21
Podium
First	(United Kingdom) George Russell	ART Grand Prix
Second	(Russia) Artem Markelov	ART Grand Prix
Third	(Brazil) Sérgio Sette Câmara	Carlin
Fastest lap
Driver	(Brazil) Sérgio Sette Câmara	Carlin
- Time: 1:34.896 (on lap 4)

The 2018 Monza FIA Formula 2 round was a pair of motor races held on 1 and 2 September 2018 at the Autodromo Nazionale Monza in Monza, Italy as part of the FIA Formula 2 Championship. It was the tenth round of the 2018 FIA Formula 2 Championship and was run in support of the 2018 Italian Grand Prix.

== Classifications ==
=== Qualifying ===
Pos.	No.	Driver	Team	Time	Gap	Grid
1	8	(United Kingdom) George Russell	ART Grand Prix	1:31.546	–	1
2	18	(Brazil) Sérgio Sette Câmara	Carlin	1:31.600	+0.054	2
3	5	(Thailand) Alexander Albon	DAMS	1:31.889	+0.343	3
4	1	(Russia) Artem Markelov	Russian Time	1:31.922	+0.376	4
5	6	(Canada) Nicholas Latifi	DAMS	1:32.021	+0.475	5
6	21	(Italy) Antonio Fuoco	Charouz Racing System	1:32.159	+0.613	9^{1}
7	19	(United Kingdom) Lando Norris	Carlin	1:32.191	+0.645	6
8	16	(India) Arjun Maini	Trident	1:32.248	+0.702	7
9	14	(Italy) Luca Ghiotto	Campos Vexatec Racing	1:32.346	+0.800	8
10	20	(Switzerland) Louis Delétraz	Charouz Racing System	1:32.407	+0.861	10
11	4	(Netherlands) Nyck de Vries	Pertamina Prema Theodore Racing	1:32.566	+1.020	11
12	7	(United Kingdom) Jack Aitken	ART Grand Prix	1:32.681	+1.135	12
13	12	(Japan) Nirei Fukuzumi	BWT Arden	1:32.735	+1.189	13
14	2	(Japan) Tadasuke Makino	Russian Time	1:32.750	+1.204	14
15	15	(Israel) Roy Nissany	Campos Vexatec Racing	1:32.801	+1.255	15
16	17	(Italy) Alessio Lorandi	Trident	1:32.803	+1.257	16
17	3	(Indonesia) Sean Gelael	Pertamina Prema Theodore Racing	1:32.913	+1.367	17
18	10	(Switzerland) Ralph Boschung	MP Motorsport	1:32.965	+1.419	18
19	11	(Germany) Maximilian Günther	BWT Arden	1:33.496	+1.950	19
20	9	(France) Dorian Boccolacci	MP Motorsport	1:48.586	+17.040	20

Notes

- ^1– Antonio Fuoco received a 3-place grid penalty.

=== Feature Race ===
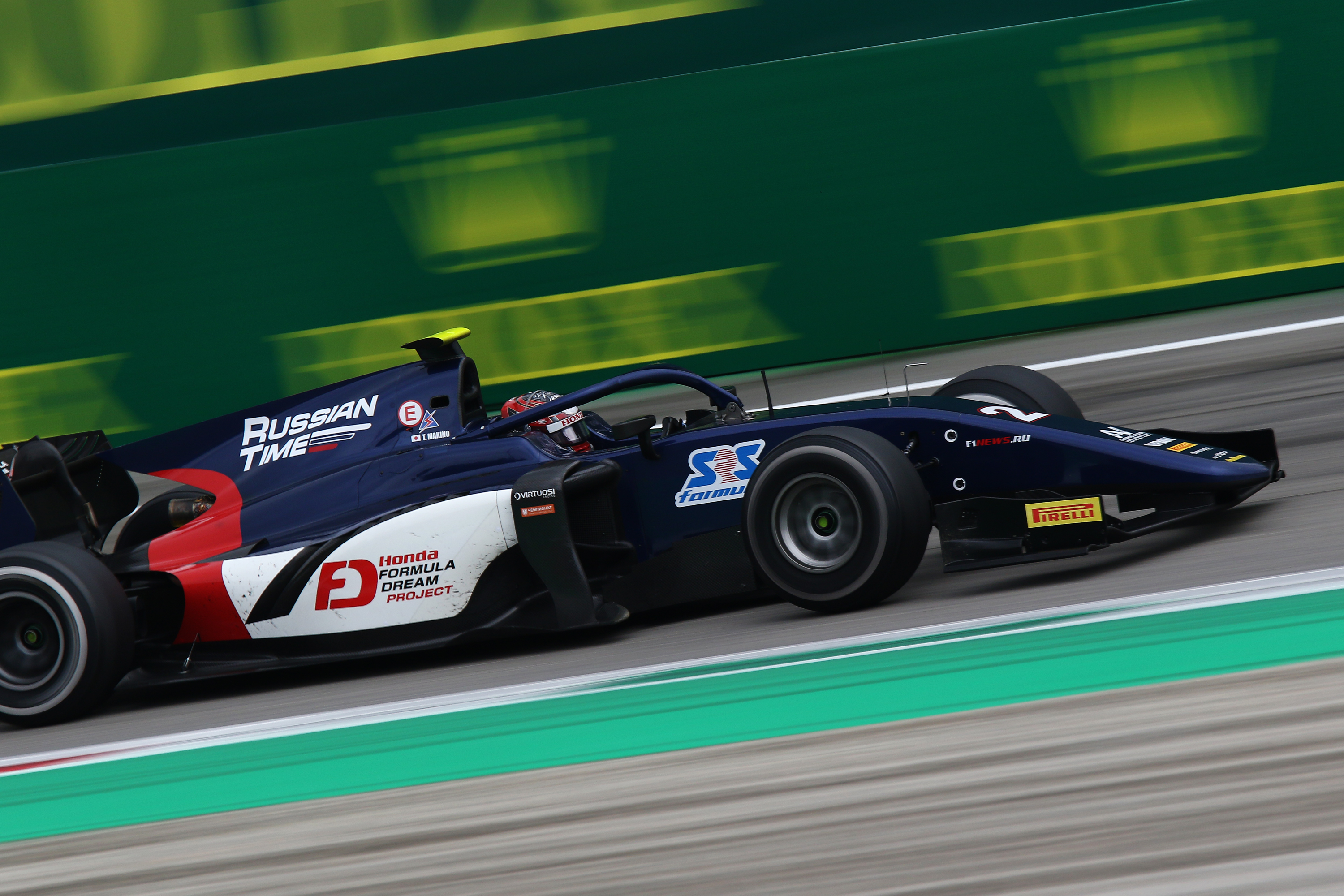
Tadasuke Makino

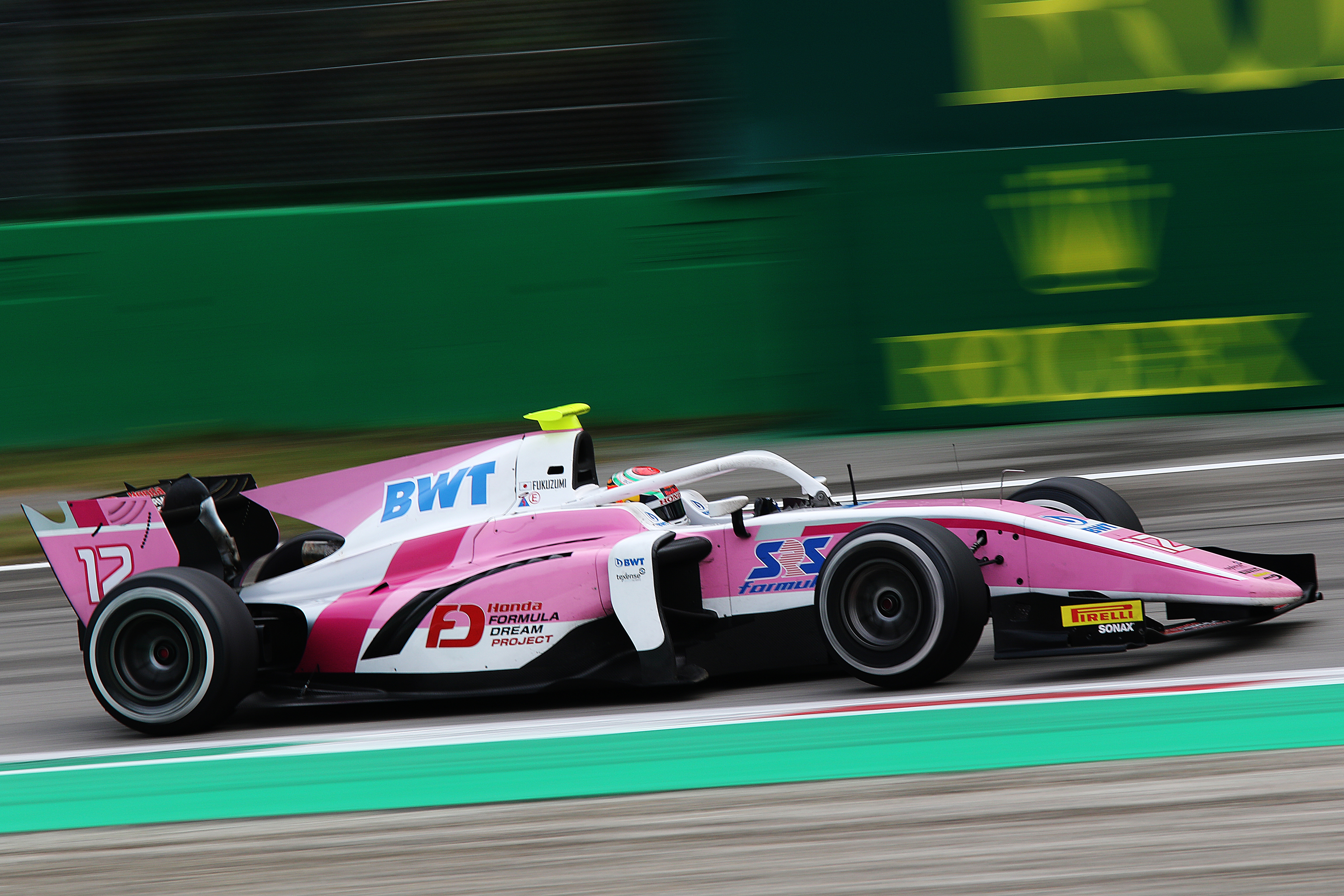
Nirei Fukuzumi

Pos.	No.	Driver	Team	Laps	Time/Retired	Grid	Points
1	2	(Japan) Tadasuke Makino	Russian Time	30	49:10.197	14	25
2	1	(Russia) Artem Markelov	Russian Time	30	+1.798	4	18 (2)
3	5	(Thailand) Alexander Albon	DAMS	30	+3.106	3	15
4	8	(United Kingdom) George Russell	ART Grand Prix	30	+6.178	1	12 (4)
5	6	(Canada) Nicholas Latifi	DAMS	30	+8.274	5	10
6	19	(United Kingdom) Lando Norris	Carlin	30	+9.017	6	8
7	18	(Brazil) Sérgio Sette Câmara	Carlin	30	+18.218	PL^{1}	6
8	10	(Switzerland) Ralph Boschung	MP Motorsport	30	+27.131	18	4
9	4	(Netherlands) Nyck de Vries	Pertamina Prema Theodore Racing	30	+27.203	11	2
10	14	(Italy) Luca Ghiotto	Campos Vexatec Racing	30	+30.393	8	1
11	3	(Indonesia) Sean Gelael	Pertamina Prema Theodore Racing	30	+43.580	17	
12	11	(Germany) Maximilian Günther	BWT Arden	30	+45.373	19	
13	20	(Switzerland) Louis Delétraz	Charouz Racing System	30	+45.492	10	
14	12	(Japan) Nirei Fukuzumi	BWT Arden	30	+48.839	13	
15	17	(Italy) Alessio Lorandi	Trident	30	+52.556	16	
16	15	(Israel) Roy Nissany	Campos Vexatec Racing	29	+1 lap	15	
17	7	(United Kingdom) Jack Aitken	ART Grand Prix	27	Puncture	12	
DNF	9	(France) Dorian Boccolacci	MP Motorsport	24	Mechanical	20	
DNF	16	(India) Arjun Maini	Trident	22	Mechanical	7	
DSQ^{2}	21	(Italy) Antonio Fuoco	Charouz Racing System	30	Disqualified	9	
Fastest lap: Sérgio Sette Câmara (Carlin) 1:35.296 (on lap 30)^{3}

Notes

- ^1– Sérgio Sette Câmara suffered problems and started from the pit lane.
- ^2– Antonio Fuoco was disqualified for having used a non-compliant throttle map at the race start.
- ^3– Sérgio Sette Câmara set the fastest lap but began the race from the pit lane, the two bonus points for fastest lap went to Artem Markelov as he set the fastest lap inside the top 10 finishers.

=== Sprint Race ===
Pos.	No.	Driver	Team	Laps	Time/Retired	Grid	Points
1	8	(United Kingdom) George Russell	ART Grand Prix	21	33:31.886	5	15
2	1	(Russia) Artem Markelov	Russian Time	21	+1.056	7	12
3	18	(Brazil) Sérgio Sette Câmara	Carlin	21	+4.347	2	10 (2)
4	6	(Canada) Nicholas Latifi	DAMS	21	+5.651	4	8
5	19	(United Kingdom) Lando Norris	Carlin	21	+6.174	3	6
6	14	(Italy) Luca Ghiotto	Campos Vexatec Racing	21	+17.452	10	4
7	9	(France) Dorian Boccolacci	MP Motorsport	21	+20.751	18	2
8	7	(United Kingdom) Jack Aitken	ART Grand Prix	21	+24.216	17	1
9	16	(India) Arjun Maini	Trident	21	+25.188	19	
10	21	(Italy) Antonio Fuoco	Charouz Racing System	21	+28.453	20	
11	20	(Switzerland) Louis Delétraz	Charouz Racing System	21	+31.875	13	
12	17	(Italy) Alessio Lorandi	Trident	21	+34.792	15	
13	12	(Japan) Nirei Fukuzumi	BWT Arden	21	+38.323	14	
14	2	(Japan) Tadasuke Makino	Russian Time	21	+1:04.379	8	
15	15	(Israel) Roy Nissany	Campos Vexatec Racing	21	+1:11.780	16	
16	11	(Germany) Maximilian Günther	BWT Arden	21	+1:12.848	12	
17	4	(Netherlands) Nyck de Vries	Pertamina Prema Theodore Racing	20	+1 lap	9	
DNF	5	(Thailand) Alexander Albon	DAMS	16	Engine	6	
DNF	10	(Switzerland) Ralph Boschung	MP Motorsport	4	Collision damage	1	
DNF	3	(Indonesia) Sean Gelael	Pertamina Prema Theodore Racing	3	Collision	11	
Fastest lap: Sérgio Sette Câmara (Carlin) 1:34.896 (on lap 4)

== Championship standings after the round ==
Drivers' Championship standings

	Pos.	Driver	Points
	1	(United Kingdom) George Russell	219
	2	(United Kingdom) Lando Norris	197
	3	(Thailand) Alexander Albon	176
1	4	(Russia) Artem Markelov	160
1	5	(Netherlands) Nyck de Vries	155

Teams' Championship standings

	Pos.	Team	Points
	1	(United Kingdom) Carlin	339
	2	(France) ART Grand Prix	281
	3	(France) DAMS	249
2	4	(Russia) Russian Time	205
1	5	(Italy) Pertamina Prema Theodore Racing	184

== See also ==
- 2018 Italian Grand Prix
- 2018 Monza GP3 Series round

Previous round: 2018 Spa-Francorchamps Formula 2 round	FIA Formula 2 Championship; 2018 season	Next round: 2018 Sochi Formula 2 round
Previous round: 2017 Monza Formula 2 round	Monza Formula 2 round	Next round: 2019 Monza Formula 2 round
