= F2: Chasing the Dream =

Docu-series

- Genre: Docuseries
- Directed by: Rory Child
- Original language: English
- No. of seasons: 7
- No. of episodes: 63

Production
- Producer: Rory Child
- Running time: 5–30 minutes

Original release
- Network: F1 TV (2020–present); YouTube (2022–present)
- Release: January 2, 2020–present

F2: Chasing the Dream (retitled as Chasing the Dream beginning its third season) is a documentary series produced by Formula One Management as a result of the success of the related Netflix docuseries, Formula 1: Drive to Survive. The series takes a behind-the-scenes look at the FIA Formula 2 Championship.

The series has received at least one season per year since 2020, with a total of 7 seasons having been released. The first season covered the 2019 Formula 2 Championship and released exclusively on Formula One's own streaming service F1 TV. The subsequent second season covered the 2020 Formula 2 Championship and premiered on 1 February 2021.

Since Season 4, the show has been released on both F1 TV and Formula One's YouTube channel. Season 5 saw the show released weekly alongside the championship year it was covering, the release format that the show currently uses.

== Episodes ==
Series	Episodes	Originally released	
Series	Episodes	First released	Last released
1	5	2 January 2020	
2	6	1 February 2021	
3	6	1 March 2022	
4	9	15 August 2022	20 December 2022
5	15	8 March 2023	30 December 2023
6	16	28 February 2024	11 December 2024
7	TBA	19 March 2025	TBA

=== Season 1 (2020) ===
No. overall	No. in season	Title	Original release date
1	1	"Episode 1"	2 January 2020
It's the start of the 2019 Formula 2 Championship at Bahrain, and all eyes are on Prema Racing's rookie driver Mick Schumacher, son of seven-time Formula 1 World Champion Michael Schumacher. As the championship moves to Baku, Nyck de Vries aims to stake a claim at the championship title, and gets his first podium of the season. At the third round of the season, UNI-Virtuosi looks to be heading towards success, with rookie driver Zhou Guanyu claiming his first podium.
2	2	"Episode 2"	2 January 2020
As the championship heads to Monaco, de Vries starts his title charge with a win in the feature race, whilst outstanding rookie Anthoine Hubert shines with his first Formula 2 win in the sprint race. Championship leader Nicholas Latifi struggles, but looks forward to a Formula 1 free practice session with Williams at the Canadian Grand Prix, his home race. Moving to France, de Vries moves ahead in the championship, while Zhou reflects on his early success in his rookie campaign. In Austria, the halfway point of the season, de Vries leads the championship by 37 points.
3	3	"Episode 3"	2 January 2020
As the championship battle intensifies, Latifi reflects on a tough couple of races as the championship moves to Great Britain, where Zhou claims his first pole position. Luca Ghiotto claims victory in the feature race after a tough battle with Latifi. Jack Aitken reflects on his journey to Formula 2 as he goes on to win the sprint race. Meanwhile, at the bottom of the standings sits Tatiana Calderón, who aims to be the next female F1 driver. As the championship moves to Hungary, the famous Schumacher name is on the top step of the podium once again, with Mick Schumacher claiming his first F2 win.
4	4	"Episode 4"	2 January 2020
One of motorsports brightest stars, Anthoine Hubert, is remembered with a tribute after his tragic loss at the 2019 Spa-Francorchamps Formula 2 round. The F2 paddock and Hubert's family reflect on his journey, his personality and his legacy, and are reminded of the dangers of the sport they love. The next round in Italy, only a week after the tragic events at Spa-Francorchamps, marked a tough weekend for the drivers as they continued to race for Hubert. Juan Manuel Correa, who suffered severe injuries in the accident, makes steps toward recovery.
5	5	"Episode 5"	2 January 2020
With two rounds to go, Nyck de Vries aims to wrap up the championship a round early, as Formula 2 moves to Russia. De Vries claims pole position and wins the feature race, clinching the title and becoming the 2019 Formula 2 Champion. Ahead of the final round in Abu Dhabi, Ghiotto is 10 points behind Latifi, as they fight for second in the championship, meanwhile Latifi is announced to be a Williams F1 driver for the 2020 season. Sérgio Sette Câmara wins the feature race and secures the team's championship for DAMS while Latifi finishes second in the sprint race, sealing second in the driver's championship.

=== Season 2 (2021) ===
No. overall	No. in season	Title	Original release date
6	1	"A Slow Start"	1 February 2021
The dawn of the 2020 Formula 2 season is put into doubt as the COVID-19 pandemic sweeps throughout the world. 2019 FIA Formula 3 vice-champion Marcus Armstrong looks back on his journey to his first Formula 2 season. In July, under COVID protocols, the first round of the championship gets underway in Austria. Callum Ilott wins the first race of the season, as he vies for the championship, while Armstrong finishes second ahead of fellow rookie Robert Shwartzman.
7	2	"The New Order"	1 February 2021
With so few seats available in Formula One, drivers sign to driver academies in hopes of increasing their chances of getting into the sport. Despite being unsigned, Felipe Drugovich manages to win the sprint race. The second round remained in Austria. Trevor Carlin discusses his team Carlin Motorsport, and his drivers, Red Bull Junior Team members Yuki Tsunoda and Jehan Daruvala. Rookie and Ferrari Driver Academy driver Robert Shwartzman wins the feature race in the rain and tributes the win to his late father. Fellow rookie and Renault Sport Academy driver Christian Lundgaard won the sprint race. The second round ended with six rookies in the top 10 of the championship, all of whom were signed to a driver academy.
8	3	"Staking A Claim"	1 February 2021
Round three in Budapest results in a second feature race win for Shwartzman ahead of fellow Russian Nikita Mazepin and teammate Mick Schumacher, and a sprint race win for Luca Ghiotto. Title contender Callum Ilott visits the team factory of UNI-Virtuosi as he reflects on the season so far, and looks ahead to a triple header in Silverstone and Barcelona. In round four, Ilott had a weekend to forget despite qualifying on pole, stalling on the grid in the feature race, and spinning out in the sprint race. Mazepin won the feature race, while Dan Ticktum won the sprint race. Whilst Tsunoda won the sprint race, it was redemption for Ilott in round five, seizing the championship lead from Shwartzman. MP Motorsport won both races at round six in Barcelona.
9	4	"Return to Spa"	1 February 2021
One year on from the tragic death of Anthoine Hubert, Formula 2 returned to Spa-Francorchamps for the seventh round. The paddock welcomes back Juan Manuel Correa on his road to recovery, as they remember the loss of Hubert. Tsunoda won the feature race after a time penalty for Mazepin. Shwartzman won the sprint race ahead of Schumacher. Both winners tributed their wins to Anthoine Hubert. Robert Shwartzman lead the championship.
10	5	"Racing DNA"	1 February 2021
Round eight in Monza marked a shift in the title race as Mick Schumacher started a firm charge, winning his first feature race. The win resembled the wins of his father, Michael Schumacher a five-time winner of the Italian Grand Prix for Ferrari. The sprint race was won by Ilott after a disqualification for Ticktum. Alex Brundle and Alex Jacques discuss the pros and cons of having a famous surname, and how drivers deal with the added pressure and expectations. Round nine featured Nikita Mazepin and Christian Lundgaard as winners, while Schumacher demoed his father's championship-winning car for Ferrari's 1000th race.
11	6	"A New Champion"	1 February 2021
Round ten in Sochi opens with Schumacher winning the feature race, extending his championship lead. Zhou Guanyu won his first sprint race after a premature ending caused by a crash between Jack Aitken and Luca Ghiotto. With a two month break before the final two rounds in Bahrain, René Rosin shows the Prema factory, hoping to clinch both the teams' and drivers' championships. Callum Ilott kept his title hopes alive with pole position in round 11 and second place in the feature race, behind Felipe Drugovich. A collision between Ilott and Daruvala in the sprint race allowed Schumacher to marginally extend his lead in the championship. Five drivers were still mathematically able to win the championship prior to the final round. Championship leader, Mick Schumacher, qualified in 18th whilst Tsunoda qualified on pole. Ilott finished in 5th ahead of Schumacher, whilst Tsunoda took the feature race win. Prema Racing won the teams' championship, while the title fight continued for one more round. A poor race from Schumacher left him finishing in 18th, however, Ilott failed to score points, allowing Schumacher to win the championship.

=== Season 3 (2022) ===
No. overall	No. in season	Title	Original release date
12	1	"Year of the Tiger"	1 March 2022
13	2	"Street Fighters"	1 March 2022
14	3	"F1 or Bust!"	1 March 2022
15	4	"Not Bad... for a Rookie"	1 March 2022
16	5	"The New Generation"	1 March 2022
17	6	"Destined for Greatness"	1 March 2022

=== Season 4 (2022) ===
No. overall	No. in season	Title	Original release date
18	1	"Back to School"	15 August 2022
19	2	"The Boy from Brazil"	22 August 2022
20	3	"The Magic City"	26 August 2022
21	4	"Fine Margins"	13 October 2022
22	5	"Dutch Passion"	26 October 2022
23	6	"Campeão"	2 November 2022
24	7	"We Leave Fear in the Drawer"	9 November 2022
25	8	"Single Seater Hope"	13 December 2022
26	9	"Dare To Be Great"	20 December 2022

=== Season 5 (2023) ===
No. overall	No. in season	Title	Original release date
27	1	"Sensational Season Opener!"	8 March 2023
28	2	"Hitting the Streets!"	22 March 2023
29	3	"Debut Down Under!"	5 April 2023
30	4	"Riding The Wave"	19 April 2023
31	5	"Street Racing"	3 May 2023
32	6	"The Magic of Monaco"	31 May 2023
33	7	"Homecoming"	7 June 2023
34	8	"Battling Bulls"	5 July 2023
35	9	"Highs and Lows"	12 July 2023
36	10	"A Home Away From Home"	26 July 2023
37	11	"Shifting Fortunes"	2 August 2023
38	12	"Storms and Stroopwafels"	30 August 2023
39	13	"In It to Win It"	6 September 2023
40	14	"Eye of the Storm"	10 November 2023
41	15	"The Final Showdown"	30 November 2023

=== Season 6 (2024) ===
No. overall	No. in season	Title	Original release date
42	1	"The Shakedown" "First Look at the Class of 24"	28 February 2024
43	2	"A New Beginning" "Zane Reigns in Bahrain"	6 March 2024
44	3	"Spins, Subs, and Sharks" "Surprises in Saudi"	13 March 2024
45	4	"The Magic of Melbourne" "PREMA Fight in Melbourne"	27 March 2024
46	5	"Tributes and Triumphs" "Colapinto Stakes His Claim"	23 May 2024
47	6	"Rolling the Dice" "Win or Bust in Monte Carlo"	29 May 2024
48	7	"La Remontada" "Correa's Catalan Comeback"	26 June 2024
49	8	"Off the Mark" "Bortoleto Stars in Austria"	3 July 2024
50	9	"Moving Up" "Shining at Silverstone"	10 July 2024
51	10	"A Star Rises"	24 July 2024
52	11	"Three's a Crowd" "Hadjar's Spa Breakaway"	1 August 2024
53	12	"Miracles in Monza" "Magnificent Monza"	4 September 2024
54	13	"New Heights" "Emotional Triumph for Trident"	18 September 2024
55	14	"Fighting Talk" "The Chase for the Title"	13 November 2024
56	15	"Heating Up" "Into the Endgame"	4 December 2024
57	16	"It All Comes Down to This..."	11 December 2024

=== Season 7 (2025) ===
No. overall	No. in season	Title	Original release date
58	1	"The Next Generation"	19 March 2025
59	2	"Bringing the Heat in the Desert"	16 April 2025
60	3	"Create Your Own Opportunities"	23 March 2025
61	4	"Dunne's Star Rises"	21 May 2025
62	5	"No Room for Mistakes"	28 May 2025
63	6	"Tensions Rise in Spain"	4 June 2025
