= Sakhir Formula 2 round =

(Bahrain) Sakhir Formula 2 round

FIA Formula 2 Championship
- Venue: Bahrain International Circuit
- Location: Sakhir, Bahrain
- First race: 2017
- Most wins (driver): (Russia) Artem Markelov (France) Théo Pourchaire (Barbados) Zane Maloney (2)
- Most wins (team): (Italy) Prema Racing (United Kingdom) Carlin (New Zealand) Rodin (3)
- Lap record: 1:43.848 ( (Belgium) Amaury Cordeel, Dallara F2 2018, 2022)

2020 (Note: Outer circuit layout of the Bahrain International Circuit, which held F2 round in 2020 along with the GP circuit.)
- Lap record: 1:04.087 ( (Germany) Mick Schumacher, Dallara F2 2018, 2020)

The Sakhir Formula 2 round is a FIA Formula 2 Championship series race that is run on the Bahrain International Circuit track in Sakhir, Bahrain. It was first used in 2017.

== Winners ==
Year	Race	Driver	Team	Circuit	Report
2017	Feature	(Russia) Artem Markelov	Russian Time	Grand Prix Circuit	Report
2017	Sprint	(Monaco) Charles Leclerc	Prema Racing	Grand Prix Circuit	Report
2018	Feature	(United Kingdom) Lando Norris	Carlin	Grand Prix Circuit	Report
2018	Sprint	(Russia) Artem Markelov	Russian Time	Grand Prix Circuit	Report
2019	Feature	(Canada) Nicholas Latifi	DAMS	Grand Prix Circuit	Report
2019	Sprint	(Italy) Luca Ghiotto	UNI-Virtuosi Racing	Grand Prix Circuit	Report
2020	Feature	(Brazil) Felipe Drugovich	MP Motorsport	Grand Prix Circuit	Report
2020	Sprint	(Russia) Robert Shwartzman	Prema Racing	Grand Prix Circuit	Report
2020	Feature	(Japan) Yuki Tsunoda	Carlin	Outer Circuit	Report
2020	Sprint	(India) Jehan Daruvala	Carlin	Outer Circuit	Report
2021	Sprint 1	(New Zealand) Liam Lawson	Hitech Grand Prix	Grand Prix Circuit	Report
2021	Sprint 2	(Australia) Oscar Piastri	Prema Racing	Grand Prix Circuit	Report
2021	Feature	(China) Guanyu Zhou	UNI-Virtuosi Racing	Grand Prix Circuit	Report
2022	Sprint	(Netherlands) Richard Verschoor	Trident	Grand Prix Circuit	Report
2022	Feature	(France) Théo Pourchaire	ART Grand Prix	Grand Prix Circuit	Report
2023	Sprint	(Switzerland) Ralph Boschung	Campos	Grand Prix Circuit	Report
2023	Feature	(France) Théo Pourchaire	ART Grand Prix	Grand Prix Circuit	Report
2024	Sprint	(Barbados) Zane Maloney	Rodin	Grand Prix Circuit	Report
2024	Feature	(Barbados) Zane Maloney	Rodin	Grand Prix Circuit	Report
2025	Sprint	(Spain) Pepe Martí	Campos	Grand Prix Circuit	Report
2025	Feature	(Republic of Ireland) Alex Dunne	Rodin	Grand Prix Circuit	Report

== See also ==
- Bahrain Grand Prix
- Sakhir Grand Prix
- Bahrain GP2 round
