= Virtuosi Racing =

British auto racing team

(United Kingdom) Virtuosi Racing
- Founded: 2012
- Founder(s): Paul Devlin; Andy Roche; Declan Lohan
- Base: Attleborough, Norfolk, England
- Team principal(s): Andy Roche
- Current series: F4 British Championship
- Former series: FIA Formula 2 Championship; GP2 Series; Auto GP
- Current drivers: F4 British Championship (United Kingdom) TBA. Joseph Smith (Australia) TBA. George Proudford-Nalder (United Kingdom) TBA. Jarrett Clark
- Teams' Championships: FIA Formula 2 Championship: 2017, 2024
- Drivers' Championships: FIA Formula 2 Championship: 2024: Gabriel Bortoleto
- Website: https://www.virtuosiracing.com/

Virtuosi Racing (formerly Virtuosi UK) is a British racing team currently competing in the F4 British Championship. The team previously raced in the Auto GP series, in addition to running the Russian Time outfit in GP2 and Formula 2 from 2015 to 2018. With the withdrawal of Russian Time, the team assumed its new name UNI-Virtuosi Racing for the 2019 F2 season. A partnership with watch company Invicta resulted in a further name change for 2023, a partial takeover which saw the birth of Invicta Racing in 2024, and a full takeover in 2025.

== History ==
In 2012, former Super Nova Racing employees Paul Devlin and Andy Roche approached businessman Declan Lohan for financial backing and Virtuosi UK team was founded at Carleton Rode, Norfolk in order to participate in the Auto GP. The team signed GP2 Series driver Pål Varhaug. His team-mates in the first rounds were European F3 Open driver Matteo Beretta and Formula Renault 3.5 Series driver Sten Pentus, before they was replaced by Auto GP veteran Francesco Dracone. Varhaug won feature race at Sonoma and reverse-grid races at Monza and Hungaroring, finishing as runner-up in the drivers' standings and bringing fourth place in the teams' standings.

For 2013, the team signed FIA European Formula 3 Championship graduate Andrea Roda. He was partnered by Max Snegirev, who previously raced for Campos Racing. Also British team supported Comtec by Virtuosi entry. Unlike the previous season Virtuosi drivers even failed to achieve podium finish and downgraded to seventh in the teams' standings.

The squad prolonged Andrea Roda for 2014 campaign. Also the team expanded to three cars for two opening rounds, fielding Richard Gonda and Sam Dejonghe. At Imola, second car was occupied by returnee Varhaug but he was replaced at Spielberg by Tamás Pál Kiss, who left Zele Racing. Also at Spielberg Roda won a reverse-grid race, it was first win for Virtuosi since 2012. Kiss collected another two wins for the team at Nürburgring and Estoril. The team finished as runner-up in the teams' standings.

In 2015, the team signed German Formula Three driver Nikita Zlobin. In addition the team replaced iSport International in the managing of the Russian Time team in the GP2 Series.

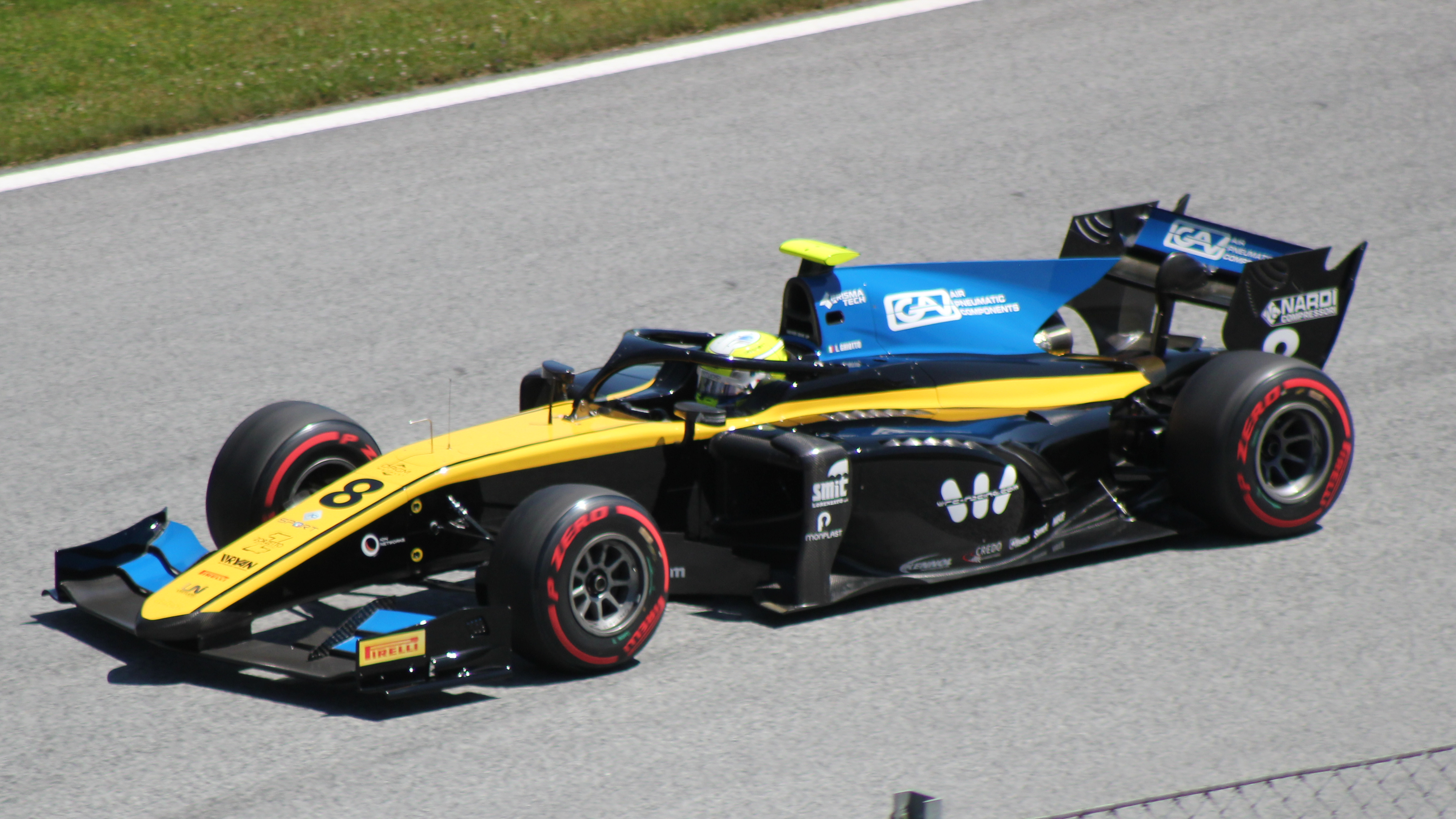
UNI-Virtuosi's Luca Ghiotto racing at the 2019 Spielberg Formula 2 round

On 4 December 2018, it was announced Virtuosi would replace the outgoing Russian Time outfit in the FIA Formula 2 Championship in 2019 under the name UNI-Virtuosi. The following day, the team confirmed Guanyu Zhou as its first driver. The next day Luca Ghiotto filled the remained slot in the Virtuosi's line-up. The team finished in second place in the Teams' Championship in its first season as Virtuosi, with Ghiotto taking four wins.

For 2020 the team retained Zhou as its first driver, whilst replacing the outgoing Ghiotto with Callum Ilott. The team repeated its runners-up finish in Teams' Championship from the previous year, again with four wins.

In 2021, Zhou was once again retained by the team, this time joined by Felipe Drugovich in the other car. For the third year in a row the team finished in second place in the Teams' Championship, once again with four wins, all scored by Zhou. On 20 October, Virtuosi Racing announced its expansion to Formula 4 racing by entering the F4 British Championship from the 2022 season onwards.

With Zhou graduating to Formula 1 in 2022 with Alfa Romeo, his seat was filled by Jack Doohan, with Marino Sato replacing Drugovich. Despite Doohan taking three wins in his rookie season the team could only finish in seventh place in the Teams' Championship.

Prior to the 2023 season, the team announced a new title partnership deal with the Invicta Watch Group. The 2023 season saw Doohan remain with the team, this time joined by Belgian Amaury Cordeel. Cordeel would have an uncompetitive season, finishing 20th in the standings. Doohan had a slow start to the season, but would rebound with two poles and three feature race wins to finish third in the standings.

Ahead of the 2024 season, Invicta announced that it had purchased an ownership stake in the team, which would thereby compete as Invicta Racing. Virtuosi would still co-own and operate the team. With Jack Doohan graduating to a test and reserve driver role with the Alpine F1 Team and Amaury Cordeel switching to Hitech, the team had a brand new driver lineup in Indian Alpine junior Kush Maini and reigning FIA Formula 3 champion Gabriel Bortoleto. It proved to be a breakthrough season for both parties, as Bortoleto collected two wins and narrowly beat Campos Racing's Isack Hadjar to the title in his rookie year. Maini's points in turn helped Invicta clinch the teams' championship, the first for Virtuosi since 2017, when the British outfit ran Russian Time. Another milestone quickly followed, as Bortoleto and Doohan became the first Virtuosi Racing drivers ever to graduate to Formula One, joining Sauber and Alpine respectively.

In March 2025, Invicta completed acquisition of the Formula 2 squad and split from Virtuosi, with the exception of Roche, who would remain a consultant.

== Current series results ==
=== F4 British Championship ===
Year	Car	Drivers	Races	Wins	Poles	F/Laps	Points	D.C.	T.C.
2022	Tatuus F4-T421	(South Korea) Michael Shin	30	1	0	1	87	11th	5th
2022	Tatuus F4-T421	(United Kingdom) Edward Pearson	30	0	0	0	81	12th	5th
2023	Tatuus F4-T421	(South Africa) Aqil Alibhai	30	1	0	0	169	8th	6th
2023	Tatuus F4-T421	(Belgium) Douwe Dedecker	30	0	0	0	26	21st	6th
2023	Tatuus F4-T421	(India) Kai Daryanani	29	0	0	0	8	24th	6th
2024	Tatuus F4-T421	(Hungary) Martin Molnár	30	0	0	0	117.5	8th	5th
2024	Tatuus F4-T421	(United Kingdom) Maxwell Dodds	26	0	0	0	43.5	16th	5th
2024	Tatuus F4-T421	(China) Yuhao Fu	30	0	0	0	27	18th	5th
2025	Tatuus F4-T421	(Hungary) Martin Molnár	30	2	3	5	277	3rd	4th
2025	Tatuus F4-T421	(Colombia) Salim Hanna	3	1	0	0	41	19th	4th
2025	Tatuus F4-T421	(Ukraine) Oleksandr Savinkov	12	0	0	0	24	24th	4th
2025	Tatuus F4-T421	(Austria) Emma Felbermayr	3	0	0	0	7	30th	4th
2026	Tatuus F4-T421	(Australia) George Proudford-Nalder	30	3	2	0	199.5	4th	3rd
2026	Tatuus F4-T421	(United Kingdom) Jarrett Clark	30	1	0	1	128	10th	3rd
2026	Tatuus F4-T421	(United Kingdom) Joseph Smith	30	3	0	3	111.5	12th	3rd
2026	Tatuus F4-T421	(Austria) Emma Felbermayr	6	0	0	0	10	31st	3rd
2026	Tatuus F4-T421	(United Kingdom) Fred Green	3	0	0	0	4	40th	3rd
2026	Tatuus F4-T421	(United States) Charlie Smith	5	0	0	0	0	45th	3rd

== Former series results ==
=== FIA Formula 2 Championship ===
Year	Chassis	Engine	Tyres	Drivers	Races	Wins	Poles	F. Laps	Podiums	D.C.	Pts	T.C.	Pts
As "Russian Time"
2017	Dallara; GP2/11	Mecachrome; V8108 V8	P	(Russia) Artem Markelov	22	5	1	6	7	2nd	210	1st	395
2017	Dallara; GP2/11	Mecachrome; V8108 V8	P	(Italy) Luca Ghiotto	22	1	0	0	7	4th	185	1st	395
2018	Dallara; F2 2018	Mecachrome; V634T V6 t	P	(Russia) Artem Markelov	24	3	0	5	7	5th	186	4th	234
2018	Dallara; F2 2018	Mecachrome; V634T V6 t	P	(Japan) Tadasuke Makino	24	1	0	0	1	13th	48	4th	234
As "UNI-Virtuosi Racing/Virtuosi Racing"
2019	Dallara; F2 2018	Mecachrome; V634T V6 t	P	(China) Zhou Guanyu	22	0	1	2	5	7th	140	2nd	347
2019	Dallara; F2 2018	Mecachrome; V634T V6 t	P	(Italy) Luca Ghiotto	22	4	2	2	9	3rd	207	2nd	347
2020	Dallara; F2 2018	Mecachrome; V634T V6 t	P	(China) Zhou Guanyu	24	1	1	4	6	6th	151.5	2nd	352.5
2020	Dallara; F2 2018	Mecachrome; V634T V6 t	P	(United Kingdom) Callum Ilott	24	3	5	0	6	2nd	201	2nd	352.5
2021	Dallara; F2 2018	Mecachrome; V634T V6 t	P	(China) Zhou Guanyu	22	4	1	1	9	3rd	183	2nd	288
2021	Dallara; F2 2018	Mecachrome; V634T V6 t	P	(Brazil) Felipe Drugovich	21	0	0	0	4	8th	105	2nd	288
2022	Dallara; F2 2018	Mecachrome; V634T V6 t	P	(Australia) Jack Doohan	28	3	3	4	6	6th	128	7th	134
2022	Dallara; F2 2018	Mecachrome; V634T V6 t	P	(Japan) Marino Sato	28	0	0	0	0	22nd	6	7th	134
2023	Dallara; F2 2018	Mecachrome; V634T V6 t	P	(Australia) Jack Doohan	25	3	2	3	5	3rd	168	5th	176
2023	Dallara; F2 2018	Mecachrome; V634T V6 t	P	(Belgium) Amaury Cordeel	26	0	0	0	0	20th	8	5th	176
As "Invicta Racing"
2024	Dallara; F2 2024	Mecachrome; V634T V6 t	P	(India) Kush Maini	28	1	1	1	5	13th	74	1st	288.5
2024	Dallara; F2 2024	Mecachrome; V634T V6 t	P	(Brazil) Gabriel Bortoleto	28	2	2	2	8	1st	214.5	1st	288.5

==== In detail ====
(key)

Year	Drivers	1	2	3	4	5	6	7	8	9	10	11	12	13	14	15	16	17	18	19	20	21	22	23	24	25	26	27	28	T.C.	Points
2017		BHR; FEA	BHR; SPR	CAT; FEA	CAT; SPR	MON; FEA	MON; SPR	BAK; FEA	BAK; SPR	RBR; FEA	RBR; SPR	SIL; FEA	SIL; SPR	HUN; FEA	HUN; SPR	SPA; FEA	SPA; SPR	MNZ; FEA	MNZ; SPR	JER; FEA	JER; SPR	YMC; FEA	YMC; SPR							1st	395
2017	(Italy) Luca Ghiotto	7	2	2	7	5	4	16	7	14	4	6	2	6	8	2	3	4	1	7	4	3	5							1st	395
2017	(Russia) Artem Markelov	1	8	8	9	2	5	4	5	8	1	4	3	17^{†}	9	1	Ret	9	15	5	1	1	6							1st	395
2018		BHR; FEA	BHR; SPR	BAK; FEA	BAK; SPR	CAT; FEA	CAT; SPR	MON; FEA	MON; SPR	LEC; FEA	LEC; SPR	RBR; FEA	RBR; SPR	SIL; FEA	SIL; SPR	HUN; FEA	HUN; SPR	SPA; FEA	SPA; SPR	MNZ; FEA	MNZ; SPR	SOC; FEA	SOC; SPR	YMC; FEA	YMC; SPR					4th	234
2018	(Russia) Artem Markelov	3	1	Ret	Ret	8	9	1	4	14	14^{†}	8	1	6	4	8	13	6	5	2	2	11	5	2	7					4th	234
2018	(Japan) Tadasuke Makino	19	17	9	9	9	Ret	14^{†}	Ret	8	Ret	7	6	12	11	9	12	12	11	1	14	10	11	9	Ret					4th	234
2019		BHR; FEA	BHR; SPR	BAK; FEA	BAK; SPR	CAT; FEA	CAT; SPR	MCO; FEA	MCO; SPR	LEC; FEA	LEC; SPR	RBR; FEA	RBR; SPR	SIL; FEA	SIL; SPR	HUN; FEA	HUN; SPR	SPA; FEA	SPA; SPR	MNZ; FEA	MNZ; SPR	SOC; FEA	SOC; SPR	YMC; FEA	YMC; SPR					2nd	347
2019	(China) Zhou Guanyu	10^{F}	4	Ret	10	3	4	5	3	4	3	6	8	3^{P}	8	9	9	C	C	Ret	4	10	5	3^{F}	8					2nd	347
2019	(Italy) Luca Ghiotto	2^{P}	1	9	Ret^{F}	4^{P}	2	DSQ	Ret	Ret	12	2	2	1	15	4	8	C	C	2	15	4^{F}	1	6	1					2nd	347
2020		RBR; FEA	RBR; SPR	RBR; FEA	RBR; SPR	HUN; FEA	HUN; SPR	SIL; FEA	SIL; SPR	SIL; FEA	SIL; SPR	CAT; FEA	CAT; SPR	SPA; FEA	SPA; SPR	MNZ; FEA	MNZ; SPR	MUG; FEA	MUG; SPR	SOC; FEA	SOC; SPR	BHR; FEA	BHR; SPR	BHR; FEA	BHR; SPR					2nd	352.5
2020	(China) Zhou Guanyu	17^{P F}	14	3	4	10	8^{F}	2^{F}	9	9	7	3	14	7	3	5	NC	Ret^{F}	5	8	1	14	5	2	4					2nd	352.5
2020	(United Kingdom) Callum Ilott	1	9	5	5	8^{P}	2	5	Ret	1^{P}	6	5^{P}	8	10	Ret	6^{P}	1	12	6	3	7	2^{P}	16	5	10					2nd	352.5
2021		BHR; SP1	BHR; SP2	BHR; FEA	MCO; SP1	MCO; SP2	MCO; FEA	BAK; SP1	BAK; SP2	BAK; FEA	SIL; SP1	SIL; SP2	SIL; FEA	MNZ; SP1	MNZ; SP2	MNZ; FEA	SOC; SP1	SOC; SP2	SOC; FEA	JED; SP1	JED; SP2	JED; FEA	YMC; SP1	YMC; SP2	YMC; FEA					2nd	288
2021	(China) Zhou Guanyu	7	3	1^{P}	1	15	5^{F}	3	Ret	13	Ret	11	1	2	8	2	DNS	C	6	17	8	4	8	1	2					2nd	288
2021	(Brazil) Felipe Drugovich	16	14	9	2	14	3	14	10	4	4	7	6	Ret	17	13	DNS	C	DNS	4	10	5	2	5	3					2nd	288
2022		BHR; SPR	BHR; FEA	JED; SPR	JED; FEA	IMO; SPR	IMO; FEA	CAT; SPR	CAT; FEA	MCO; SPR	MCO; FEA	BAK; SPR	BAK; FEA	SIL; SPR	SIL; FEA	RBR; SPR	RBR; FEA	LEC; SPR	LEC; FEA	HUN; SPR	HUN; FEA	SPA; SPR	SPA; FEA	ZAN; SPR	ZAN; FEA	MNZ; SPR	MNZ; FEA	YMC; SPR	YMC; FEA	7th	134
2022	(Australia) Jack Doohan	10	10^{P}	Ret	9^{F}	11	Ret	6	2^{P F}	7^{F}	4	11	13	1	9	3	19^{F}	4	5	1	Ret	2	1	9	Ret	6	Ret^{P}	7	Ret	7th	134
2022	(Japan) Marino Sato	16	11	8	17	16	11	17	19	15	10	17†	8	Ret	15	Ret	16	9	Ret	15	15	12	15	19	Ret	11	11	19	15	7th	134
2023		BHR; SPR	BHR; FEA	JED; SPR	JED; FEA	ALB; SPR	ALB; FEA	BAK; SPR	BAK; FEA	MCO; SPR	MCO; FEA	CAT; SPR	CAT; FEA	RBR; SPR	RBR; FEA	SIL; SPR	SIL; FEA	HUN; SPR	HUN; FEA	SPA; SPR	SPA; FEA	ZAN; SPR	ZAN; FEA	MNZ; SPR	MNZ; FEA	YMC; SPR	YMC; FEA			5th	176
2023	(Australia) Jack Doohan	11	16	7	2	Ret	8	17†	15	6^{F}	Ret	5	6	7	4	3	4	10	1^{P F}	5	1^{F}	6	DNS	9	6	6	1^{P}			5th	176
2023	(Belgium) Amaury Cordeel	21	15	19	20	12	13	9	19	Ret	NC	17	19	15	17	16	Ret	19	21	Ret	15	16	8	Ret	8	17	16			5th	176
2024		BHR; SPR	BHR; FEA	JED; SPR	JED; FEA	ALB; SPR	ALB; FEA	IMO; SPR	IMO; FEA	MCO; SPR	MCO; FEA	CAT; SPR	CAT; FEA	RBR; SPR	RBR; FEA	SIL; SPR	SIL; FEA	HUN; SPR	HUN; FEA	SPA; SPR	SPA; FEA	MNZ; SPR	MNZ; FEA	BAK; SPR	BAK; FEA	LUS; SPR	LUS; FEA	YMC; SPR	YMC; FEA	1st	288.5
2024	(India) Kush Maini	13	7	8	2^{P}	3	12	8	14	Ret	17	2	6	7	17	3	19	1	7	13	15	11	15^{F}	9	DSQ	20†	14	17	12	1st	288.5
2024	(Brazil) Gabriel Bortoleto	6	5^{P}	10	Ret	Ret	Ret	6	2^{P}	2	8	5	10	4	1	4	6	16^{F}	4	10	2	8	1	5	4^{F}	5	3	2	2	1st	288.5

== Timeline ==
Current series
F4 British Championship	2022–present
Former series
Auto GP	2012–2015
GP2 Series	2015–2016
FIA Formula 2 Championship	2017–2024
