= 2021 Sakhir Formula 2 round =

Motor racing competition

2021 Bahrain Formula 2 round
Round details
- Round 1 of 8 in the 2021 FIA Formula 2 Championship.
- Location: Bahrain International Circuit, Sakhir, Bahrain
- Course: Permanent racing facility 5.406 km (3.359 mi)

Sprint race 1
- Date: 27 March 2021
- Laps: 23
Podium
First	(New Zealand) Liam Lawson	Hitech Grand Prix
Second	(India) Jehan Daruvala	Carlin
Third	(Germany) David Beckmann	Charouz Racing System
Fastest lap
Driver	(Germany) Lirim Zendeli	MP Motorsport
- Time: 1:50.886 (on lap 5)

Sprint race 2
- Date: 27 March 2021
- Laps: 23
Podium
First	(Australia) Oscar Piastri	Prema Racing
Second	(Denmark) Christian Lundgaard	ART Grand Prix
Third	(China) Guanyu Zhou	UNI-Virtuosi Racing
Fastest lap
Driver	(Switzerland) Ralph Boschung	Campos Racing
- Time: 1:45.507 (on lap 21)

Feature race
- Date: 28 March 2021
- Laps: 32
Pole position
Driver	(China) Guanyu Zhou	UNI-Virtuosi Racing
Time	1:42.848	
Podium
First	(China) Guanyu Zhou	UNI-Virtuosi Racing
Second	(United Kingdom) Dan Ticktum	Carlin
Third	(New Zealand) Liam Lawson	Hitech Grand Prix
Fastest lap
Driver	(Russia) Robert Shwartzman	Prema Racing
- Time: 1:46.380 (on lap 19)

The 2021 Bahrain Formula 2 round was a couple of motor races for Formula 2 cars that took place on 27–28 March 2021 at the Bahrain International Circuit in Sakhir, Bahrain as part of the FIA Formula 2 Championship. It was the first round of the 2021 FIA Formula 2 Championship and ran in support of the 2021 Bahrain Grand Prix.

== Classification ==
=== Qualifying ===
Pos.	No.	Driver	Team	Time	Gap	Grid
1	3	(China) Guanyu Zhou	UNI-Virtuosi Racing	1:42.848		1
2	9	(Denmark) Christian Lundgaard	ART Grand Prix	1:42.851	+0.003	2
3	4	(Brazil) Felipe Drugovich	UNI-Virtuosi Racing	1:43.211	+0.363	3
4	5	(United Kingdom) Dan Ticktum	Carlin	1:43.338	+0.490	4
5	11	(Netherlands) Richard Verschoor	MP Motorsport	1:43.443	+0.595	5
6	6	(India) Jehan Daruvala	Carlin	1:43.475	+0.627	6
7	2	(Australia) Oscar Piastri	Prema Racing	1:43.478	+0.630	7
8	7	(New Zealand) Liam Lawson	Hitech Grand Prix	1:43.519	+0.671	8
9	14	(Germany) David Beckmann	Charouz Racing System	1:43.559	+0.711	9
10	10	(France) Théo Pourchaire	ART Grand Prix	1:43.585	+0.737	10
11	1	(Russia) Robert Shwartzman	Prema Racing	1:43.694	+0.846	11
12	21	(Switzerland) Ralph Boschung	Campos Racing	1:43.704	+0.856	12
13	17	(New Zealand) Marcus Armstrong	DAMS	1:43.729	+0.881	13
14	16	(Israel) Roy Nissany	DAMS	1:43.768	+0.920	14
15	24	(Netherlands) Bent Viscaal	Trident	1:43.839	+0.991	15
16	12	(Germany) Lirim Zendeli	MP Motorsport	1:43.955	+1.107	16
17	15	(Brazil) Guilherme Samaia	Charouz Racing System	1:44.227	+1.379	17
18	25	(Japan) Marino Sato	Trident	1:44.654	+1.806	18
19	22	(Italy) Matteo Nannini	HWA Racelab	1:44.825	+1.977	19
20	20	(Brazil) Gianluca Petecof	Campos Racing	1:45.053	+2.205	20
21	23	(Italy) Alessio Deledda	HWA Racelab	1:46.712	+3.864	21
DSQ	8	(Estonia) Jüri Vips	Hitech Grand Prix	1:43.442	Disqualified^{1}	22

Note：

- ^1 - Jüri Vips was excluded from qualifying for a technical infringement, of Article 4.3.13 of the 2021 FIA F2 Technical Regulations. He started from the back of the grid in both the first Sprint race and the Feature Race.

=== Sprint race 1 ===
Pos.	No.	Driver	Team	Laps	Time/Retired	Grid	Points
1	7	(New Zealand) Liam Lawson	Hitech Grand Prix	23	44:11.624	3	15
2	6	(India) Jehan Daruvala	Carlin	23	+0.925	5	12
3	14	(Germany) David Beckmann	Charouz Racing System	23	+14.382	2	10
4	1	(Russia) Robert Shwartzman	Prema Racing	23	+17.078	11	8
5	2	(Australia) Oscar Piastri	Prema Racing	23	+17.504	4	6
6	9	(Denmark) Christian Lundgaard	ART Grand Prix	23	+18.552	9	4
7	3	(China) Guanyu Zhou	UNI-Virtuosi Racing	23	+22.289	10	2
8	5	(United Kingdom) Dan Ticktum	Carlin	23	+24.860^{2}	7	1
9	12	(Germany) Lirim Zendeli	MP Motorsport	23	+27.291	16	(2)
10	8	(Estonia) Jüri Vips	Hitech Grand Prix	23	+27.933	22	
11	15	(Brazil) Guilherme Samaia	Charouz Racing System	23	+31.908^{3}	17	
12	16	(Israel) Roy Nissany	DAMS	23	+32.305	14	
13	24	(Netherlands) Bent Viscaal	Trident	23	+33.694^{4}	15	
14	22	(Italy) Matteo Nannini	HWA Racelab	23	+33.963	19	
15	25	(Japan) Marino Sato	Trident	23	+46.885	18	
16	4	(Brazil) Felipe Drugovich	UNI-Virtuosi Racing	23	+1:03.250	8	
17	20	(Brazil) Gianluca Petecof	Campos Racing	23	+1:06.941	20	
18	23	(Italy) Alessio Deledda	HWA Racelab	23	+1:08.910	21	
DNF	10	(France) Théo Pourchaire	ART Grand Prix	12	Mechanical	1	
DNF	17	(New Zealand) Marcus Armstrong	DAMS	2	Power loss	13	
DNF	21	(Switzerland) Ralph Boschung	Campos Racing	2	Collision damage	12	
DNF	11	(Netherlands) Richard Verschoor	MP Motorsport	2	Collision damage	6	
Fastest lap： (Germany) Lirim Zendeli − MP Motorsport − 1:50.886 (lap 5)

Notes：

- ^2 - Dan Ticktum originally finished seventh, but was given a five-second time penalty for causing a collision with Richard Verschoor, which dropped him to eighth.
- ^3 - Guilherme Samaia originally finished ninth, but was given a five-second time penalty for a Virtual Safety Car infringement.
- ^4 - Bent Viscaal originally finished twelfth, but was later given a five-second time penalty for overtaking Jüri Vips under yellow flag conditions.

=== Sprint race 2 ===
Pos.	No.	Driver	Team	Laps	Time/Retired	Grid	Points
1	2	(Australia) Oscar Piastri	Prema Racing	23	46:19.610	6	15
2	9	(Denmark) Christian Lundgaard	ART Grand Prix	23	+0.774^{5}	5	12
3	3	(China) Guanyu Zhou	UNI-Virtuosi Racing	23	+2.076	4	10
4	6	(India) Jehan Daruvala	Carlin	23	+2.494	9	8
5	11	(Netherlands) Richard Verschoor	MP Motorsport	23	+2.966	22	6
6	10	(France) Théo Pourchaire	ART Grand Prix	23	+3.759	19	4
7	14	(Germany) David Beckmann	Charouz Racing System	23	+6.387	8	2
8	25	(Japan) Marino Sato	Trident	23	+8.096	15	1
9	22	(Italy) Matteo Nannini	HWA Racelab	23	+9.733	14	
10	17	(New Zealand) Marcus Armstrong	DAMS	23	+12.180	20	
11	15	(Brazil) Guilherme Samaia	Charouz Racing System	23	+12.442	11	
12	24	(Netherlands) Bent Viscaal	Trident	23	+16.744	13	
13	20	(Brazil) Gianluca Petecof	Campos Racing	23	+17.569	17	
14	4	(Brazil) Felipe Drugovich	UNI-Virtuosi Racing	23	+24.547	16	
15	16	(Israel) Roy Nissany	DAMS	23	+27.471	12	
16	8	(Estonia) Jüri Vips	Hitech Grand Prix	23	+36.980	1	
17	21	(Switzerland) Ralph Boschung	Campos Racing	23	+48.466	21	
DNF	23	(Italy) Alessio Deledda	HWA Racelab	19	Driveshaft	PL	
DNF	7	(New Zealand) Liam Lawson	Hitech Grand Prix	14	Collision	10	
DNF	12	(Germany) Lirim Zendeli	MP Motorsport	12	Collision damage	2	
DNF	5	(United Kingdom) Dan Ticktum	Carlin	0	Collision	3	
DNF	1	(Russia) Robert Shwartzman	Prema Racing	0	Collision	7	
Fastest lap： (Switzerland) Ralph Boschung − Campos Racing − 1:45.507 (lap 21)

Note

- ^5 - Christian Lundgaard was given a 10-second time penalty, which he is believed to have served in the pits under a safety car.

=== Feature race ===
Pos.	No.	Driver	Team	Laps	Time/Retired	Grid	Points
1	3	(China) Guanyu Zhou	UNI-Virtuosi Racing	32	1:02:27.858	1	25 (4)
2	5	(United Kingdom) Dan Ticktum	Carlin	32	+0.482	4	18
3	7	(New Zealand) Liam Lawson	Hitech Grand Prix	32	+2.950	8	15
4	11	(Netherlands) Richard Verschoor	MP Motorsport	32	+4.095	5	12
5	17	(New Zealand) Marcus Armstrong	DAMS	32	+9.792	13	10
6	6	(India) Jehan Daruvala	Carlin	32	+11.926	6	8
7	1	(Russia) Robert Shwartzman	Prema Racing	32	+12.159	11	6 (2)
8	10	(France) Théo Pourchaire	ART Grand Prix	32	+18.479	10	4
9	4	(Brazil) Felipe Drugovich	UNI-Virtuosi Racing	32	+19.764^{6}	3	2
10	22	(Italy) Matteo Nannini	HWA Racelab	32	+19.852	19	1
11	14	(Germany) David Beckmann	Charouz Racing System	32	+20.905	9	
12	9	(Denmark) Christian Lundgaard	ART Grand Prix	32	+21.256^{6}	2	
13	8	(Estonia) Jüri Vips	Hitech Grand Prix	32	+27.385^{6}	22	
14	25	(Japan) Marino Sato	Trident	32	+28.826^{6}	18	
15	21	(Switzerland) Ralph Boschung	Campos Racing	32	+31.535	12	
16	15	(Brazil) Guilherme Samaia	Charouz Racing System	32	+40.620	17	
17	24	(Netherlands) Bent Viscaal	Trident	32	+48.452^{6}	21	
18	12	(Germany) Lirim Zendeli	MP Motorsport	32	+1:01.952	16	
19	2	(Australia) Oscar Piastri	Prema Racing	29	Collision^{7}	7	
DNF	20	(Brazil) Gianluca Petecof	Campos Racing	15	Fire extinguisher	20	
DNF	23	(Italy) Alessio Deledda	HWA Racelab	0	Collision	21	
DNF	16	(Israel) Roy Nissany	DAMS	0	Collision	14	
Fastest lap： (Russia) Robert Shwartzman − Prema Racing − 1:46.380 (lap 19)

Note

- ^6 - Felipe Drugovich, Christian Lundgaard, Jüri Vips and Marino Sato all received five-second time penalties for Safety Car infringements. Bent Viscaal was even given a ten-second time penalty for the same reason.
- ^7 - Oscar Piastri was forced to retire after a collision with Dan Ticktum on lap 30, but was classified for the race, as he completed over 90% of the race distance.

== Standings after the event ==
Drivers' Championship standings

Pos	Driver	Points
1	(China) Guanyu Zhou	41
2	(New Zealand) Liam Lawson	30
3	(India) Jehan Daruvala	28
4	(Australia) Oscar Piastri	21
5	(United Kingdom) Dan Ticktum	19

Teams' Championship standings

Pos	Team	Points
1	(United Kingdom) Carlin	47
2	(United Kingdom) UNI-Virtuosi Racing	43
3	(Italy) Prema Racing	37
4	(United Kingdom) Hitech Grand Prix	30
5	(France) ART Grand Prix	24

- Note: Only the top five positions are included for both sets of standings.

== See also ==
- 2021 Bahrain Grand Prix

Previous round: 2020 2nd Sakhir Formula 2 round	FIA Formula 2 Championship; 2021 season	Next round: 2021 Monte Carlo Formula 2 round
Previous round: 2020 2nd Sakhir Formula 2 round	Sakhir Formula 2 round	Next round: 2022 Sakhir Formula 2 round
