= 2022 Sakhir Formula 2 round =

Motor racing meeting

(Bahrain) 2022 Sakhir Formula 2 round
Round details
- Round 1 of 14 in the 2022 FIA Formula 2 Championship.
- Layout of the Bahrain International Circuit
- Location: Bahrain International Circuit; Sakhir, Bahrain
- Course: Permanent racing facility 5.412 km (3.363 mi)

Sprint Race
- Date: 19 March 2022
- Laps: 23
Podium
First	(Netherlands) Richard Verschoor	Trident
Second	(India) Jehan Daruvala	Prema Racing
Third	(New Zealand) Liam Lawson	Carlin
Fastest lap
Driver	(Belgium) Amaury Cordeel	Van Amersfoort Racing
- Time: 1:43.848 (on lap 20)

Feature Race
- Date: 20 March 2022
- Laps: 32
Pole position
Driver	(Australia) Jack Doohan	Virtuosi Racing
Time	1:40.542	
Podium
First	(France) Théo Pourchaire	ART Grand Prix
Second	(New Zealand) Liam Lawson	Carlin
Third	(Estonia) Jüri Vips	Hitech Grand Prix
Fastest lap
Driver	(Estonia) Jüri Vips	Hitech Grand Prix
- Time: 1:46.845 (on lap 17)

The 2022 Sakhir FIA Formula 2 round was a motor racing event held between 18 and 20 March 2022 at the Bahrain International Circuit, Sakhir, Bahrain. It was the opening race of the 2022 FIA Formula 2 Championship and was held in support of the 2022 Bahrain Grand Prix.

== Classification ==
=== Qualifying ===
Qualifying took place on 18 March 2022, where Jack Doohan scored his first pole position in the series.

Pos.	No.	Driver	Entrant	Time	Grid SR	Grid FR
1	3	(Australia) Jack Doohan	Virtuosi Racing	1:40.542	10	1
2	10	(France) Théo Pourchaire	ART Grand Prix	+0.141	9	2
3	8	(Estonia) Jüri Vips	Hitech Grand Prix	+0.213	8	3
4	6	(United States) Logan Sargeant	Carlin	+0.218	7	4
5	15	(Switzerland) Ralph Boschung	Campos Racing	+0.458	6	5
6	5	(New Zealand) Liam Lawson	Carlin	+0.558	5	6
7	2	(India) Jehan Daruvala	Prema Racing	+0.573	4	7
8	24	(United Kingdom) Jake Hughes	Van Amersfoort Racing	+0.579	3	8
9	20	(Netherlands) Richard Verschoor	Trident	+0.636	2	9
10	11	(Brazil) Felipe Drugovich	MP Motorsport	+0.668	1	10
11	16	(Israel) Roy Nissany	DAMS	+0.676	11	11
12	21	(Australia) Calan Williams	Trident	+0.771	12	12
13	7	(New Zealand) Marcus Armstrong	Hitech Grand Prix	+0.822	13	13
14	4	(Japan) Marino Sato	Virtuosi Racing	+0.832	14	14
15	1	(Norway) Dennis Hauger	Prema Racing	+0.967	15	15
16	22	(Brazil) Enzo Fittipaldi	Charouz Racing System	+0.987	16	16
17	14	(United Kingdom) Olli Caldwell	Campos Racing	+1.210	17	17
18	12	(France) Clément Novalak	MP Motorsport	+1.323	18	18
19	9	(Denmark) Frederik Vesti	ART Grand Prix	+1.541	19	19
20	23	(Turkey) Cem Bölükbaşı	Charouz Racing System	+1.547	20	20
21	25	(Belgium) Amaury Cordeel	Van Amersfoort Racing	+2.338	21	21
107% time: 1:47.579
—	17	(Japan) Ayumu Iwasa	DAMS	No time set	22	22

=== Sprint Race ===
Pos.	No.	Driver	Entrant	Laps	Time/Retired	Grid	Points
1	20	(Netherlands) Richard Verschoor	Trident	23	43:34.983	2	10
2	2	(India) Jehan Daruvala	Prema Racing	23	+1.853	4	8
3	5	(New Zealand) Liam Lawson	Carlin	23	+4.975	5	6
4	15	(Switzerland) Ralph Boschung	Campos Racing	23	+6.981	6	5
5	11	(Brazil) Felipe Drugovich	MP Motorsport	23	+8.801	1	4
6	6	(United States) Logan Sargeant	Carlin	23	+9.263	7	3
7	8	(Estonia) Jüri Vips	Hitech Grand Prix	23	+13.350	8	2
8	17	(Japan) Ayumu Iwasa	DAMS	23	+15.749	22	1
9	1	(Norway) Dennis Hauger	Prema Racing	23	+17.665	15	
10	3	(Australia) Jack Doohan	Virtuosi Racing	23	+21.472	10	
11	22	(Brazil) Enzo Fittipaldi	Charouz Racing System	23	+22.902	16	
12	16	(Israel) Roy Nissany	DAMS	23	+26.574	11	
13	9	(Denmark) Frederik Vesti	ART Grand Prix	23	+27.490	19	
14	23	(Turkey) Cem Bölükbaşı	Charouz Racing System	23	+31.921	20	
15	21	(Australia) Calan Williams	Trident	23	+49.959	12	
16	4	(Japan) Marino Sato	Virtuosi Racing	23	+50.640^{1}	14	
17	25	(Belgium) Amaury Cordeel	Van Amersfoort Racing	23	+52.671	21	
18	12	(France) Clément Novalak	MP Motorsport	23	+1:18.205^{2}	18	
19	14	(United Kingdom) Olli Caldwell	Campos Racing	22	Engine	17	
DNF	24	(United Kingdom) Jake Hughes	Van Amersfoort Racing	14	Collision^{2}	3	
DNF	10	(France) Théo Pourchaire	ART Grand Prix	6	Oil	9	
DNF	7	(New Zealand) Marcus Armstrong	Hitech Grand Prix	2	Collision	13	
Fastest lap set by (Belgium) Amaury Cordeel: 1:43.848 (lap 20)

Notes:

- ^1 – Marino Sato had 5 seconds added to his race time for failing to respect track limits. He had one penalty point added to his license.
- ^2 – Clément Novalak and Jake Hughes both received 10 second time penalties for causing a collision. Both drivers had two penalty points added to their license.

=== Feature Race ===
Pos.	No.	Driver	Entrant	Laps	Time/Retired	Grid	Points
1	10	(France) Théo Pourchaire	ART Grand Prix	31	1:01:54.454	2	25
2	5	(New Zealand) Liam Lawson	Carlin	31	+0.925	6	18
3	8	(Estonia) Jüri Vips	Hitech Grand Prix	31	+1.714	3	15 (1)
4	15	(Switzerland) Ralph Boschung	Campos Racing	31	+3.863	5	12
5	7	(New Zealand) Marcus Armstrong	Hitech Grand Prix	31	+4.606	13	10
6	11	(Brazil) Felipe Drugovich	MP Motorsport	31	+5.722	10	8
7	6	(United States) Logan Sargeant	Carlin	31	+6.539	4	6
8	16	(Israel) Roy Nissany	DAMS	31	+7.256	11	4
9	24	(United Kingdom) Jake Hughes	Van Amersfoort Racing	31	+8.008	8	2
10	3	(Australia) Jack Doohan	Virtuosi Racing	31	+8.854	1	1 (2)
11	4	(Japan) Marino Sato	Virtuosi Racing	31	+11.353	14	
12	2	(India) Jehan Daruvala	Prema Racing	31	+14.361^{1}	7	
13	22	(Brazil) Enzo Fittipaldi	Charouz Racing System	31	+15.074^{2}	16	
14	23	(Turkey) Cem Bölükbaşı	Charouz Racing System	31	+15.965	20	
15	25	(Belgium) Amaury Cordeel	Van Amersfoort Racing	31	+22.704^{3}	21	
16	17	(Japan) Ayumu Iwasa	DAMS	31	+31.170	22	
17	14	(United Kingdom) Olli Caldwell	Campos Racing	30	+1 lap^{4}	17	
18	21	(Australia) Calan Williams	Trident	27	Wheel	12	
19	1	(Norway) Dennis Hauger	Prema Racing	27	Wheel	PL	
DNF	20	(Netherlands) Richard Verschoor	Trident	26	Collision	9	
DNF	12	(France) Clément Novalak	MP Motorsport	12	Engine	18	
DNF	9	(Denmark) Frederik Vesti	ART Grand Prix	1	Collision	19	
Fastest lap set by (Estonia) Jüri Vips: 1:46.845 (lap 17)

Notes:

- ^1 – Jehan Daruvala had 5 seconds added to his race time for failing to respect track limits. One penalty point was added to his license.
- ^2 – Enzo Fittipaldi had 5 seconds added to his race time for causing a collision with Richard Verschoor. One penalty point was added to his license.
- ^3 – Amaury Cordeel had 5 seconds and 10 seconds added to his race time, both for speeding in the pitlane. No penalty points were added to his license.
- ^4 – Olli Caldwell had 5 seconds added to his race time as the team failed to wait the correct period of time before carrying out the pit stop. No penalty points were added to his license for this offense.

== Standings after the event ==
Drivers' Championship standings

Pos.	Driver	Points
1	(France) Théo Pourchaire	25
2	(New Zealand) Liam Lawson	24
3	(Estonia) Jüri Vips	18
4	(Switzerland) Ralph Boschung	17
5	(Brazil) Felipe Drugovich	12

Teams' Championship standings

Pos.	Team	Points
1	(United Kingdom) Carlin	33
2	(United Kingdom) Hitech Grand Prix	28
3	(France) ART Grand Prix	25
4	(Spain) Campos Racing	17
5	(Netherlands) MP Motorsport	12

- Note: Only the top five positions are included for both sets of standings.

== See also ==
- 2022 Bahrain Grand Prix
- 2022 Sakhir Formula 3 round

Previous round: 2021 Yas Island Formula 2 round	FIA Formula 2 Championship; 2022 season	Next round: 2022 Jeddah Formula 2 round
Previous round: 2021 Sakhir Formula 2 round	Sakhir Formula 2 round	Next round: 2023 Sakhir Formula 2 round
