= 2019 Monte Carlo Formula 2 round =

Motor racing competition

(Monaco) 2019 Monte Carlo Formula 2 round
Round details
- Round 4 of 12 in the 2019 FIA Formula 2 Championship.
- Layout of the Circuit de Monaco
- Location: Circuit de Monaco, Monte-Carlo, Monaco
- Course: Temporary racing facility 3.337 km (2.074 mi)

Feature race
- Date: 24 May 2019
- Laps: 41
Pole position
Driver	(Netherlands) Nyck de Vries	ART Grand Prix
Time	1:20.676	
Podium
First	(Netherlands) Nyck de Vries	ART Grand Prix
Second	(Japan) Nobuharu Matsushita	Carlin
Third	(Brazil) Sérgio Sette Câmara	DAMS
Fastest lap
Driver	(Japan) Nobuharu Matsushita	Carlin
- Time: 1:22.243 (on 38)

Sprint race
- Date: 25 May 2019
- Laps: 30
Podium
First	(France) Anthoine Hubert	BWT Arden
Second	(Switzerland) Louis Delétraz	Carlin
Third	(China) Guanyu Zhou	UNI-Virtuosi
Fastest lap
Driver	(Indonesia) Sean Gelael	Prema Racing
- Time: 1:23.318 (on 27)

The 2019 Monte Carlo Formula 2 round was a pair of motor races for Formula 2 cars that took place on 24 and 25 May 2019 at the Circuit de Monaco in Monte-Carlo, Monaco as part of the FIA Formula 2 Championship. It was the fourth round of the 2019 FIA Formula 2 Championship and was run in support of the 2019 Monaco Grand Prix.

== Background ==
=== Driver changes ===
Artem Markelov made a one-off return as a replacement for Jordan King at MP Motorsport, who was competing in the 2019 Indianapolis 500 with Rahal Letterman Lanigan Racing.

== Classification ==
=== Qualifying ===
==== Group A ====
Pos.	No.	Driver	Team	Time	Gap	Grid
1	11	(United Kingdom) Callum Ilott	Sauber Junior Team by Charouz	1:21.462	–	2
2	9	(Germany) Mick Schumacher	Prema Racing	1:21.469	+0.007	4
3	5	(Brazil) Sérgio Sette Câmara	DAMS	1:21.537	+0.075	5
4	19	(France) Anthoine Hubert	BWT Arden	1:21.675	+0.213	7
5	1	(Switzerland) Louis Delétraz	Carlin	1:21.936	+0.474	10
6	3	(Russia) Nikita Mazepin	ART Grand Prix	1:22.089	+0.627	12
7	21	(Switzerland) Ralph Boschung	Trident	1:22.233	+0.771	14
8	7	(China) Guanyu Zhou	UNI-Virtuosi	1:22.772	+1.310	16
9	15	(United Kingdom) Jack Aitken	Campos Racing	1:22.877	+1.415	18
10	17	(Netherlands) Mahaveer Raghunathan	MP Motorsport	1:26.522	+5.060	20

==== Group B ====
Pos.	No.	Driver	Team	Time	Gap	Grid
1	4	(Netherlands) Nyck de Vries	ART Grand Prix	1:20.676	–	1
2	8	(Italy) Luca Ghiotto	UNI-Virtuosi	1:20.924	+0.248	3
3	6	(Canada) Nicholas Latifi	DAMS	1:21.130	+0.454	8^{1}
4	10	(Indonesia) Sean Gelael	Prema Racing	1:21.598	+0.922	6
5	2	(Japan) Nobuharu Matsushita	Carlin	1:21.807	+1.131	9
6	16	(Russia) Artem Markelov	MP Motorsport	1:22.086	+1.410	11
7	14	(France) Dorian Boccolacci	Campos Racing	1:22.290	+1.614	13
8	12	(United States) Juan Manuel Correa	Sauber Junior Team by Charouz	1:22.437	+1.761	15
9	20	(France) Giuliano Alesi	Trident	1:22.785	+2.109	17
10	18	(Colombia) Tatiana Calderón	BWT Arden	1:24.791	+4.115	19

Notes

- ^1 – Nicholas Latifi was given a three-place grid penalty for exiting the pit lane whilst the pit exit light was red.

=== Feature race ===
The race has been red-flagged midway-through on lap 20 after a collision between Mick Schumacher and Tatiana Calderón on Rascasse. As a result, everyone down between Calderón in ninth and Raghunathan in nineteenth was stuck behind the incident. That bizarrely meant that the entire top eight gained a lap on the rest of the field, although they would all have to serve their mandatory stop after the race restarted.

Pos.	No.	Driver	Entrant	Laps	Time/Retired	Grid	Points
1	4	(Netherlands) Nyck de Vries	ART Grand Prix	41	1:30:56.153	1	25 (4)
2	2	(Japan) Nobuharu Matsushita	Carlin	41	+4.046	9	18 (2)
3	5	(Brazil) Sérgio Sette Câmara	DAMS	41	+5.470	5	15
4	14	(France) Dorian Boccolacci	Campos Racing	41	+9.120	13	12
5	7	(China) Guanyu Zhou	UNI-Virtuosi	41	+1:02.548	16	10
6	16	(Russia) Artem Markelov	MP Motorsport	40	+1 lap	11	8
7	1	(Switzerland) Louis Delétraz	Carlin	40	+1 lap	10	6
8	19	(France) Anthoine Hubert	BWT Arden	40	+1 lap	7	4
9	21	(Switzerland) Ralph Boschung	Trident	40	+1 lap^{1}	14	2
10	3	(Russia) Nikita Mazepin	ART Grand Prix	40	+1 lap	12	1
11	20	(France) Giuliano Alesi	Trident	40	+1 lap	17	
12	6	(Canada) Nicholas Latifi	DAMS	40	+1 lap	8	
13	9	(Germany) Mick Schumacher	Prema Racing	40	+1 lap^{2}	4	
14	17	(Netherlands) Mahaveer Raghunathan	MP Motorsport	39	+2 laps^{3}	20	
15	18	(Colombia) Tatiana Calderón	BWT Arden	39	+2 laps	19	
DNF	12	(United States) Juan Manuel Correa	Sauber Junior Team by Charouz	37	Accident	15	
DNF	15	(United Kingdom) Jack Aitken	Campos Racing	36	Collision damage	18	
DNF	10	(Indonesia) Sean Gelael	Prema Racing	32	Collision damage	6	
DNS	11	(United Kingdom) Callum Ilott	Sauber Junior Team by Charouz	0	Mechanical	2	
DSQ	8	(Italy) Luca Ghiotto	UNI-Virtuosi	41	Disqualified^{4}	3	
Fastest lap: Nobuharu Matsushita (Carlin) — 1:22.243 (on lap 38)

Notes

- ^1 – Ralph Boschung was given a ten-second time penalty for leaving the track and gaining an advantage.
- ^2 – Mick Schumacher was given a five-second time penalty for leaving the track and gaining an advantage.
- ^3 – Mahaveer Raghunathan was given a five-second time penalty for leaving the track and gaining an advantage as well as a twenty-second time penalty for causing an avoidable collision with Jack Aitken.
- ^4 – Luca Ghiotto originally finished 2nd but was disqualified for his car using rack stops of a thickness that did not comply with the sporting regulations.

=== Sprint race ===
Pos.	No.	Driver	Entrant	Laps	Time/Retired	Grid	Points
1	19	(France) Anthoine Hubert	BWT Arden	30	44:23.388	1	15
2	1	(Switzerland) Louis Delétraz	Carlin	30	+0.059	2	12
3	7	(China) Guanyu Zhou	UNI-Virtuosi	30	+0.922	4	10
4	16	(Russia) Artem Markelov	MP Motorsport	30	+2.459	3	8
5	14	(France) Dorian Boccolacci	Campos Racing	30	+13.689	5	6
6	5	(Brazil) Sérgio Sette Câmara	DAMS	30	+16.322	6	4
7	4	(Netherlands) Nyck de Vries	ART Grand Prix	30	+16.952	8	2
8	3	(Russia) Nikita Mazepin	ART Grand Prix	30	+17.337	10	1
9	2	(Japan) Nobuharu Matsushita	Carlin	30	+18.770	7	
10	6	(Canada) Nicholas Latifi	DAMS	30	+19.335	12	(2)^{1}
11	9	(Germany) Mick Schumacher	Prema Racing	30	+21.559	13	
12	12	(United States) Juan Manuel Correa	Sauber Junior Team by Charouz	30	+22.639	16	
13	15	(United Kingdom) Jack Aitken	Campos Racing	30	+23.284	17	
14	11	(United Kingdom) Callum Ilott	Sauber Junior Team by Charouz	30	+24.813	19	
15	10	(Indonesia) Sean Gelael	Prema Racing	29	+1 lap	18	
DNF	20	(France) Giuliano Alesi	Trident	17	Collision	11	
DNF	21	(Switzerland) Ralph Boschung	Trident	9	Mechanical	9	
DNF	17	(Netherlands) Mahaveer Raghunathan	MP Motorsport	6	Collision	15	
DNF	8	(Italy) Luca Ghiotto	UNI-Virtuosi	6	Collision	20	
DNF	18	(Colombia) Tatiana Calderón	BWT Arden	2	Collision	14	
Fastest lap: Sean Gelael (Prema Racing) – 1:23.318 (on lap 27)^{1}

Notes

- ^1 – Sean Gelael set the fastest lap, but finished outside the top 10, so he was ineligible to score points for the fastest lap. The two bonus points for the fastest lap were awarded to Nicholas Latifi as he set the fastest lap of those who finished inside the top 10 with a time of 1:23.868.

== Championship standings after the round ==
Drivers' Championship standings

	Pos.	Driver	Points
	1	(Canada) Nicholas Latifi	95
1	2	(Netherlands) Nyck de Vries	94
1	3	(Italy) Luca Ghiotto	67
	4	(United Kingdom) Jack Aitken	62
	5	(China) Guanyu Zhou	54

Teams' Championship standings

	Pos.	Entrant	Points
	1	(France) DAMS	147
	2	(United Kingdom) UNI-Virtuosi	121
1	3	(France) ART Grand Prix	100
1	4	(Spain) Campos Racing	92
4	5	(United Kingdom) Carlin	60

Previous round: 2019 Barcelona FIA Formula 2 round	FIA Formula 2 Championship; 2019 season	Next round: 2019 Paul Ricard FIA Formula 2 round
Previous round: 2018 Monaco FIA Formula 2 round	FIA Formula 2 round	Next round: 2021 Monte Carlo Formula 2 round
