= 2019 Sakhir Formula 2 round =

Motor racing competition

(Bahrain) 2019 Sakhir Formula 2 round
Round details
- Round 1 of 12 in the 2019 FIA Formula 2 Championship.
- Layout of the Bahrain International Circuit
- Location: Bahrain International Circuit, Sakhir, Bahrain
- Course: Permanent racing facility 5.406 km (3.359 mi)

Feature race
- Date: 30 March 2019
- Laps: 32
Pole position
Driver	(Italy) Luca Ghiotto	UNI-Virtuosi Racing
Time	1:40.504	
Podium
First	(Canada) Nicholas Latifi	DAMS
Second	(Italy) Luca Ghiotto	UNI-Virtuosi Racing
Third	(Brazil) Sérgio Sette Câmara	DAMS
Fastest lap
Driver	(China) Guanyu Zhou	UNI-Virtuosi Racing
- Time: 1:47.645 (on lap 18)

Sprint race
- Date: 31 March 2019
- Laps: 23
Podium
First	(Italy) Luca Ghiotto	UNI-Virtuosi Racing
Second	(Brazil) Sérgio Sette Câmara	DAMS
Third	(Canada) Nicholas Latifi	DAMS
Fastest lap
Driver	(Netherlands) Nyck de Vries	ART Grand Prix
- Time: 1:47.145 (on lap 14)

The 2019 Sakhir Formula 2 round was a pair of motor races for Formula 2 cars that took place on 30 and 31 March 2019 at the Bahrain International Circuit in Sakhir, Bahrain as part of the FIA Formula 2 Championship. It was the first round of the 2019 FIA Formula 2 Championship and ran in support of the 2019 Bahrain Grand Prix.

== Classification ==
=== Qualifying ===
Pos.	No.	Driver	Team	Time	Gap	Grid
1	8	(Italy) Luca Ghiotto	UNI-Virtuosi Racing	1:40.504	–	1
2	1	(Switzerland) Louis Delétraz	Carlin	1:40.871	+0.367	2
3	4	(Netherlands) Nyck de Vries	ART Grand Prix	1:40.889	+0.385	3
4	6	(Canada) Nicholas Latifi	DAMS	1:40.964	+0.460	4
5	15	(United Kingdom) Jack Aitken	Campos Racing	1:41.115	+0.611	5
6	2	(Japan) Nobuharu Matsushita	Carlin	1:41.137	+0.633	6
7	10	(Indonesia) Sean Gelael	Prema Racing	1:41.254	+0.750	7
8	5	(Brazil) Sérgio Sette Câmara	DAMS	1:41.310	+0.806	8
9	21	(Switzerland) Ralph Boschung	Trident	1:41.505	+1.001	9
10	9	(Germany) Mick Schumacher	Prema Racing	1:41.583	+1.079	10
11	19	(France) Anthoine Hubert	BWT Arden	1:41.596	+1.092	11
12	12	(United States) Juan Manuel Correa	Sauber Junior Team by Charouz	1:41.722	+1.218	12
13	3	(Russia) Nikita Mazepin	ART Grand Prix	1:41.848	+1.344	13
14	16	(United Kingdom) Jordan King	MP Motorsport	1:41.857	+1.353	14
15	20	(France) Giuliano Alesi	Trident	1:41.864	+1.360	15
16	14	(France) Dorian Boccolacci	Campos Racing	1:41.918	+1.414	16
17	7	(China) Guanyu Zhou	UNI-Virtuosi Racing	1:42.123	+1.619	17
18	11	(United Kingdom) Callum Ilott	Sauber Junior Team by Charouz	1:42.280	+1.776	18
19	18	(Colombia) Tatiana Calderón	BWT Arden	1:42.810	+2.306	19
20	17	(Netherlands) Mahaveer Raghunathan	MP Motorsport	1:43.343	+2.839	20

=== Feature race ===
Pos.	No.	Driver	Team	Laps	Time/Retired	Grid	Points
1	6	(Canada) Nicholas Latifi	DAMS	32	59:19.517	4	25
2	8	(Italy) Luca Ghiotto	UNI-Virtuosi Racing	32	+8.744	1	18 (4)
3	5	(Brazil) Sérgio Sette Câmara	DAMS	32	+14.826	8	15
4	19	(France) Anthoine Hubert	BWT Arden	32	+17.273	11	12
5	1	(Switzerland) Louis Delétraz	Carlin	32	+26.686	2	10
6	4	(Netherlands) Nyck de Vries	ART Grand Prix	32	+28.497	3	8
7	15	(United Kingdom) Jack Aitken	Campos Racing'	32	+31.545	5	6
8	9	(Germany) Mick Schumacher	Prema Racing	32	+34.708	10	4
9	2	(Japan) Nobuharu Matsushita	Carlin	32	+37.395	6	2
10	7	(China) Guanyu Zhou	UNI-Virtuosi Racing	32	+41.131	17	1 (2)
11	21	(Switzerland) Ralph Boschung	Trident	32	+42.092	9	
12	20	(France) Giuliano Alesi	Trident	32	+47.711	15	
13	18	(Colombia) Tatiana Calderón	BWT Arden	32	+55.775	19	
14	11	(United Kingdom) Callum Ilott	Sauber Junior Team by Charouz	32	+56.293	18	
15	14	(France) Dorian Boccolacci	Campos Racing	32	+1:14.247	16	
16	12	(United States) Juan Manuel Correa	Sauber Junior Team by Charouz	32	+1:24.988	12	
17	16	(United Kingdom) Jordan King	MP Motorsport	32	+1:26.511	14	
18	17	(Netherlands) Mahaveer Raghunathan	MP Motorsport	32	+1:33.150	20	
19	3	(Russia) Nikita Mazepin	ART Grand Prix	32	+1:37.568	13	
DNF	10	(Indonesia) Sean Gelael	Prema Racing	4	Spun off	7	
Fastest lap: Guanyu Zhou (UNI-Virtuosi Racing) — 1:47.645 (on lap 18)

=== Sprint race ===
Pos.	No.	Driver	Team	Laps	Time/Retired	Grid	Points
1	8	(Italy) Luca Ghiotto	UNI-Virtuosi Racing	23	42:36.192	7	15
2	5	(Brazil) Sérgio Sette Câmara	DAMS	23	+5.474	6	12
3	6	(Canada) Nicholas Latifi	DAMS	23	+6.867	8	10
4	7	(China) Guanyu Zhou	UNI-Virtuosi Racing	23	+18.240	10	8
5	1	(Switzerland) Louis Delétraz	Carlin	23	+21.939	4	6
6	9	(Germany) Mick Schumacher	Prema Racing	23	+24.679	1	4
7	4	(Netherlands) Nyck de Vries	ART Grand Prix	23	+25.154	3	2 (2)
8	16	(United Kingdom) Jordan King	MP Motorsport	23	+25.520	17	1
9	19	(France) Anthoine Hubert	BWT Arden	23	+30.514	5	
10	10	(Indonesia) Sean Gelael	Prema Racing	23	+30.532	20	
11	15	(United Kingdom) Jack Aitken	Campos Racing	23	+32.224	2	
12	2	(Japan) Nobuharu Matsushita	Carlin	23	+35.980	9	
13	3	(Russia) Nikita Mazepin	ART Grand Prix	23	+40.541	19	
14	21	(Switzerland) Ralph Boschung	Trident	23	+43.074	11	
15	18	(Colombia) Tatiana Calderón	BWT Arden	23	+46.006	13	
16	11	(United Kingdom) Callum Ilott	Sauber Junior Team by Charouz	23	+56.487	14	
17	14	(France) Dorian Boccolacci	Campos Racing	23	+1:00.048	15	
18	12	(United States) Juan Manuel Correa	Sauber Junior Team by Charouz	23	+1:32.585	16	
19	17	(Netherlands) Mahaveer Raghunathan	MP Motorsport	22	+1 lap	18	
DSQ	20	(France) Giuliano Alesi	Trident	23	Disqualified^{1}	12	
Fastest lap: Nyck de Vries (ART Grand Prix) — 1:47.145 (on lap 14)

Notes

- ^1 – Giuliano Alesi originally finished 18th but was disqualified for the incorrect use of tyre, as he used a tyre assigned to the right side, on the left side of his car.

== Championship standings after the round ==
Drivers' Championship standings

Pos.	Driver	Points
1	(Italy) Luca Ghiotto	37
2	(Canada) Nicholas Latifi	35
3	(Brazil) Sérgio Sette Câmara	27
4	(Switzerland) Louis Delétraz	16
5	(France) Anthoine Hubert	12

Teams' Championship standings

Pos.	Team	Points
1	(France) DAMS	62
2	(United Kingdom) UNI-Virtuosi Racing	48
3	(United Kingdom) Carlin	18
4	(United Kingdom) BWT Arden	12
5	(France) ART Grand Prix	12

Previous round: 2018 Yas Island Formula 2 round	FIA Formula 2 Championship; 2019 season	Next round: 2019 Baku Formula 2 round
Previous round: 2018 Sakhir Formula 2 round	Sakhir Formula 2 round	Next round: 2020 Sakhir Formula 2 round
