= 2020 2nd Sakhir Formula 2 round =

Motor racing competition

(Bahrain) 2020 2nd Sakhir Formula 2 round
Round details
- Round 12 of 12 in the 2020 FIA Formula 2 Championship.
- Outer Layout of the Bahrain International Circuit
- Location: Bahrain International Circuit, Sakhir, Bahrain
- Course: Permanent racing facility 3.543 km (2.202 mi)

Feature race
- Date: 5 December 2020
- Laps: 48
Pole position
Driver	(Japan) Yuki Tsunoda	Carlin
Time	1:02.676	
Podium
First	(Japan) Yuki Tsunoda	Carlin
Second	(China) Guanyu Zhou	UNI-Virtuosi
Third	(Brazil) Felipe Drugovich	MP Motorsport
Fastest lap
Driver	(Germany) Mick Schumacher	Prema Racing
- Time: 1:04.087 (on lap 33)

Sprint race
- Date: 6 December 2020
- Laps: 23
Podium
First	(India) Jehan Daruvala	Carlin
Second	(Japan) Yuki Tsunoda	Carlin
Third	(United Kingdom) Dan Ticktum	DAMS
Fastest lap
Driver	(Germany) Mick Schumacher	Prema Racing
- Time: 1:04.383 (on lap 24)

The 2020 Sakhir 2nd Formula 2 round was a pair of motor races for Formula 2 cars that took place on 5-6 December 2020 at the Outer Circuit Layout of the Bahrain International Circuit in Sakhir, Bahrain as part of the FIA Formula 2 Championship. It was the final race of the 2020 FIA Formula 2 Championship and ran in support of the 2020 Sakhir Grand Prix.

== Report ==
=== Background ===
Ralph Boschung replaced Jack Aitken for this round as Aitken moves to Williams to debut in 2020 Sakhir Grand Prix instead of George Russell, who will move to Mercedes instead of reigning F1 champion Lewis Hamilton, who got positive COVID-19 test.

Pirelli supplied the field with P Zero White hard tyres and P Zero Red soft tyres for the round.

=== Qualifying ===
Yuki Tsunoda collected another pole ahead of feature race, outpacing Nikita Mazepin by 0.122 seconds. Qualifying session was ended preliminary after the contact between Mick Schumacher and Roy Nissany.

=== Feature race ===
Tsunoda lost the lead after the first turn but was able to restore his lead after the pit stop and won the race ahead of Guanyu Zhou and Mazepin. But Mazepin was penalised after two incidents where his defence was recognised as forcing of Tsunoda and Felipe Drugovich, who became a last podium finisher instead of Mazepin.

=== Sprint race ===
With Callum Ilott not being able to outscore Mick Schumacher by 14 points, Schumacher won the 2020 Formula 2 Championship.

== Classification ==
=== Qualifying ===
Pos.	No.	Driver	Team	Time	Gap	Grid
1	7	(Japan) Yuki Tsunoda	Carlin	1:02.676		1
2	24	(Russia) Nikita Mazepin	Hitech Grand Prix	1:02.798	+0.122	2
3	8	(India) Jehan Daruvala	Carlin	1:02.807	+0.131	3
4	21	(Russia) Robert Shwartzman	Prema Racing	1:02.822	+0.146	4
5	15	(Brazil) Felipe Drugovich	MP Motorsport	1:02.841	+0.165	5
6	6	(Denmark) Christian Lundgaard	ART Grand Prix	1:02.849	+0.173	6
7	16	(Russia) Artem Markelov	BWT HWA Racelab	1:02.947	+0.271	7
8	2	(United Kingdom) Dan Ticktum	DAMS	1:02.954	+0.278	8
9	4	(United Kingdom) Callum Ilott	UNI-Virtuosi	1:03.014	+0.338	9
10	11	(Switzerland) Louis Delétraz	Charouz Racing System	1:03.062	+0.386	10
11	3	(China) Guanyu Zhou	UNI-Virtuosi	1:03.075	+0.399	11
12	23	(Japan) Marino Sato	Trident	1:03.116	+0.440	12
13	12	(Brazil) Pedro Piquet	Charouz Racing System	1:03.147	+0.471	13
14	25	(Italy) Luca Ghiotto	Hitech Grand Prix	1:03.166	+0.490	14
15	5	(New Zealand) Marcus Armstrong	ART Grand Prix	1:03.169	+0.493	15
16	14	(France) Giuliano Alesi	MP Motorsport	1:03.194	+0.518	16
17	17	(France) Théo Pourchaire	BWT HWA Racelab	1:03.228	+0.552	17
18	20	(Germany) Mick Schumacher	Prema Racing	1:03.270	+0.594	18
19	22	(Israel) Roy Nissany	Trident	1:03.317	+0.641	19
20	9	(Switzerland) Ralph Boschung	Campos Racing	1:03.403	+0.727	20
21	10	(Brazil) Guilherme Samaia	Campos Racing	1:03.552	+0.876	21
22	1	(Indonesia) Sean Gelael	DAMS	1:03.738	+1.062	22

=== Feature race ===
Pos.	No.	Driver	Entrant	Laps	Time/Retired	Grid	Points
1	7	(Japan) Yuki Tsunoda	Carlin	48	52:59.396	1	25 (4)
2	3	(China) Guanyu Zhou	UNI-Virtuosi	48	+5.613	11	18
3	15	(Brazil) Felipe Drugovich	MP Motorsport	48	+6.655	5	15
4	21	(Russia) Robert Shwartzman	Prema Racing	48	+7.438	4	12
5	4	(United Kingdom) Callum Ilott	UNI-Virtuosi	48	+8.143	9	10
6	20	(Germany) Mick Schumacher	Prema Racing	48	+10.339	18	8 (2)
7	8	(India) Jehan Daruvala	Carlin	48	+11.818	3	6
8	2	(United Kingdom) Dan Ticktum	DAMS	48	+14.640	8	4
9	24	(Russia) Nikita Mazepin	Hitech Grand Prix	48	+16.280^{1}	2	2
10	12	(Brazil) Pedro Piquet	Charouz Racing System	48	+17.511	13	1
11	5	(New Zealand) Marcus Armstrong	ART Grand Prix	48	+17.789	15	
12	11	(Switzerland) Louis Deletraz	Charouz Racing System	48	+19.374	10	
13	16	(Russia) Artem Markelov	BWT HWA Racelab	48	+31.999	7	
14	9	(Switzerland) Ralph Boschung	Campos Racing	48	+34.388	20	
15	14	(France) Giuliano Alesi	MP Motorsport	48	+35.082	16	
16	25	(Italy) Luca Ghiotto	Hitech Grand Prix	48	+38.113	14	
17	23	(Japan) Marino Sato	Trident Racing	48	+39.059	12	
18	17	(France) Théo Pourchaire	BWT HWA Racelab	48	+41.719	17	
19	1	(Indonesia) Sean Gelael	DAMS	48	+45.847	22	
20	22	(Israel) Roy Nissany	Trident Racing	48	+50.305	19	
21	6	(Denmark) Christian Lundgaard	ART Grand Prix	48	+59.292	6	
22	10	(Brazil) Guilherme Samaia	Campos Racing	47	+1 lap	21	
Fastest lap： (Germany) Mick Schumacher (Prema Racing) — 1:04.087 (lap 33)

Note：

- ^1 – Nikita Mazepin originally finished in third place, but his defence against Yuki Tsunoda and Felipe Drugovich was considered as pushing of the track limits, which resulted to two five-second (10 seconds total) extra time penalty, and finally he was classified ninth.

=== Sprint race ===
Pos.	No.	Driver	Entrant	Laps	Time/Retired	Grid	Points
1	8	(India) Jehan Daruvala	Carlin	34	37:26.570	2	15
2	7	(Japan) Yuki Tsunoda	Carlin	34	+3.561	8	12 (2)
3	2	(United Kingdom) Dan Ticktum	DAMS	34	+3.902	1	10
4	3	(China) Guanyu Zhou	UNI-Virtuosi	34	+5.615	7	8
5	21	(Russia) Robert Shwartzman	Prema Racing	34	+7.585	5	6
6	14	(France) Giuliano Alesi	MP Motorsport	34	+9.040	15	4
7	25	(Italy) Luca Ghiotto	Hitech Grand Prix	34	+11.093	16	2
8	15	(Brazil) Felipe Drugovich	MP Motorsport	34	+13.878	6	1
9	24	(Russia) Nikita Mazepin	Hitech Grand Prix	34	+14.536	9	
10	4	(United Kingdom) Callum Ilott	UNI-Virtuosi	34	+16.023	4	
11	12	(Brazil) Pedro Piquet	Charouz Racing System	34	+16.157	10	
12	6	(Denmark) Christian Lundgaard	ART Grand Prix	34	+17.051	21	
13	11	(Switzerland) Louis Delétraz	Charouz Racing System	34	+20.176	12	
14	5	(New Zealand) Marcus Armstrong	ART Grand Prix	34	+21.844	11	
15	22	(Israel) Roy Nissany	Trident Racing	34	+23.639	20	
16	23	(Japan) Marino Sato	Trident Racing	34	+26.089	17	
17	1	(Indonesia) Sean Gelael	DAMS	34	+26.759	19	
18	20	(Germany) Mick Schumacher	Prema Racing	34	+28.529	3	
19	10	(Brazil) Guilherme Samaia	Campos Racing	34	+35.936	22	
20	16	(Russia) Artem Markelov	BWT HWA Racelab	34	+59.769	13	
21	17	(France) Théo Pourchaire	BWT HWA Racelab	33	+1 lap	18	
DNF	9	(Switzerland) Ralph Boschung	Campos Racing	9	Retired	14	
Fastest lap： (Japan) Yuki Tsunoda (Carlin) — 1:04.812 (lap 6)

== Final championship standings ==
Drivers' Championship standings

	Pos.	Driver	Points
	1	(Germany) Mick Schumacher	215
	2	(United Kingdom) Callum Ilott	201
2	3	(Japan) Yuki Tsunoda	200
	4	(Russia) Robert Shwartzman	177
2	5	(Russia) Nikita Mazepin	164

Teams' Championship standings

	Pos.	Team	Points
	1	(Italy) Prema Racing	392
	2	(United Kingdom) UNI-Virtuosi	352.5
1	3	(United Kingdom) Carlin	272
1	4	(United Kingdom) Hitech Grand Prix	270
	5	(France) ART Grand Prix	201

- Note: Only the top five positions are included for both sets of standings.
- Note: Bold names include the Drivers' and Teams' Champion respectively.

== See also ==
- 2020 Sakhir Grand Prix

Previous round: 2020 Sakhir Formula 2 round	FIA Formula 2 Championship; 2020 season	Next round: 2021 Sakhir Formula 2 round
Previous round: 2020 Sakhir Formula 2 round	Sakhir Formula 2 round	Next round: 2021 Sakhir Formula 2 round
