= 2019 Barcelona Formula 2 round =

Pair of Formula 2 motor races

(Spain) 2019 Barcelona Formula 2 round
Round details
- Round 3 of 12 in the 2019 FIA Formula 2 Championship.
- Layout of the Circuit de Barcelona-Catalunya
- Location: Circuit de Barcelona-Catalunya, Montmeló, Catalonia, Spain
- Course: Permanent racing facility 4.655 km (2.892 mi)

Feature race
- Date: 11 May 2019
- Laps: 37
Pole position
Driver	(Italy) Luca Ghiotto	UNI-Virtuosi
Time	1:28.031	
Podium
First	(Canada) Nicholas Latifi	DAMS
Second	(United Kingdom) Jack Aitken	Campos Racing
Third	(China) Guanyu Zhou	UNI-Virtuosi
Fastest lap
Driver	(United Kingdom) Jordan King	MP Motorsport
- Time: 1:32.266 (on lap 35)

Sprint race
- Date: 12 May 2019
- Laps: 26
Podium
First	(Netherlands) Nyck de Vries	ART Grand Prix
Second	(Italy) Luca Ghiotto	UNI-Virtuosi
Third	(United Kingdom) Callum Ilott	Sauber Junior Team by Charouz
Fastest lap
Driver	(Canada) Nicholas Latifi	DAMS
- Time: 1:32.444 (on lap 17)

The 2019 Barcelona FIA Formula 2 round was a pair of motor races for Formula 2 cars that took place on 11 and 12 May 2019 at the Circuit de Barcelona-Catalunya in Catalonia, Spain as part of the FIA Formula 2 Championship. It was the third round of the 2019 FIA Formula 2 Championship and ran in support of the 2019 Spanish Grand Prix.

== Classification ==
=== Qualifying ===
Pos.	No.	Driver	Team	Time	Gap	Grid
1	8	(Italy) Luca Ghiotto	UNI-Virtuosi	1:28.031	–	1
2	6	(Canada) Nicholas Latifi	DAMS	1:28.212	+0.181	2
3	7	(China) Guanyu Zhou	UNI-Virtuosi	1:28.249	+0.218	3
4	4	(Netherlands) Nyck de Vries	ART Grand Prix	1:28.266	+0.235	4
5	15	(United Kingdom) Jack Aitken	Campos Racing	1:28.355	+0.324	8^{1}
6	11	(United Kingdom) Callum Ilott	Sauber Junior Team by Charouz	1:28.470	+0.439	5
7	5	(Brazil) Sérgio Sette Câmara	DAMS	1:28.550	+0.519	6
8	21	(Switzerland) Ralph Boschung	Trident	1:28.580	+0.549	7
9	10	(France) Dorian Boccolacci	Campos Racing	1:28.581	+0.550	12^{1}
10	9	(Germany) Mick Schumacher	Prema Racing	1:28.605	+0.574	9
11	2	(Japan) Nobuharu Matsushita	Carlin	1:28.683	+0.652	10
12	3	(Russia) Nikita Mazepin	ART Grand Prix	1:28.758	+0.727	11
13	10	(Indonesia) Sean Gelael	Prema Racing	1:28.761	+0.730	13
14	1	(Switzerland) Louis Delétraz	Carlin	1:28.869	+0.838	14
15	19	(France) Anthoine Hubert	BWT Arden	1:28.980	+0.949	15
16	16	(United Kingdom) Jordan King	MP Motorsport	1:29.023	+0.992	16
17	20	(France) Giuliano Alesi	Trident	1:29.346	+1.315	17
18	18	(Colombia) Tatiana Calderón	BWT Arden	1:29.590	+1.559	20^{2}
19	12	(United States) Juan Manuel Correa	Sauber Junior Team by Charouz	1:30.171	+2.140	18
20	17	(Netherlands) Mahaveer Raghunathan	MP Motorsport	1:30.691	+2.660	19

Notes

- ^1 – Jack Aitken and Dorian Boccolacci were given three-place grid penalties for the use of an undeclared and unmarked rear plank.
- ^2 – Tatiana Calderón was given a three-place grid penalty for causing a collision at the previous round in Baku.

=== Feature race ===
Pos.	No.	Driver	Team	Laps	Time/Retired	Grid	Points
1	6	(Canada) Nicholas Latifi	DAMS	37	1:01:10.688	2	25
2	15	(United Kingdom) Jack Aitken	Campos Racing	37	+1.935	8	18
3	7	(China) Guanyu Zhou	UNI-Virtuosi	37	+3.325	3	15
4	8	(Italy) Luca Ghiotto	UNI-Virtuosi	37	+4.361	1	12 (4)
5	4	(Netherlands) Nyck de Vries	ART Grand Prix	37	+9.468	4	10
6	19	(France) Anthoine Hubert	BWT Arden	37	+12.489	15	8
7	16	(United Kingdom) Jordan King	MP Motorsport	37	+14.277	16	6 (2)
8	11	(United Kingdom) Callum Ilott	Sauber Junior Team by Charouz	37	+17.385	5	4
9	10	(Indonesia) Sean Gelael	Prema Racing	37	+19.072	13	2
10	21	(Switzerland) Ralph Boschung	Trident	37	+25.722	7	1
11	2	(Japan) Nobuharu Matsushita	Carlin	37	+33.602	10	
12	1	(Switzerland) Louis Delétraz	Carlin	37	+38.546	14	
13	18	(Colombia) Tatiana Calderón	BWT Arden	37	+45.789	20	
14	14	(France) Dorian Boccolacci	Campos Racing	37	+47.649	12	
15	9	(Germany) Mick Schumacher	Prema Racing	37	+1:11.994	9	
16	17	(Netherlands) Mahaveer Raghunathan	MP Motorsport	37	+1:33.773	19	
NC	3	(Russia) Nikita Mazepin	ART Grand Prix	33	+4 laps	11	
NC	5	(Brazil) Sérgio Sette Câmara	DAMS	28	+9 laps	6	
DNF	12	(United States) Juan Manuel Correa	Sauber Junior Team by Charouz	24	Brakes	18	
DNF	20	(France) Giuliano Alesi	Trident	0	Spun off	17	
Fastest lap: Jordan King (MP Motorsport) — 1:32.266 (on lap 35)

=== Sprint race ===
Pos.	No.	Driver	Team	Laps	Time/Retired	Grid	Points
1	4	(Netherlands) Nyck de Vries	ART Grand Prix	26	42:25.916	4	15
2	8	(Italy) Luca Ghiotto	UNI-Virtuosi	26	+2.399	5	12
3	11	(United Kingdom) Callum Ilott	Sauber Junior Team by Charouz	26	+4.382	1	10
4	7	(China) Guanyu Zhou	UNI-Virtuosi	26	+11.183	6	8
5	19	(France) Anthoine Hubert	BWT Arden	26	+12.567	3	6
6	6	(Canada) Nicholas Latifi	DAMS	26	+13.088	8	4 (2)
7	16	(United Kingdom) Jordan King	MP Motorsport	26	+21.419	2	2
8	15	(United Kingdom) Jack Aitken	Campos Racing	26	+26.644	7	1
9	10	(Indonesia) Sean Gelael	Prema Racing	26	+27.445	9	
10	21	(Switzerland) Ralph Boschung	Trident	26	+28.169	10	
11	1	(Switzerland) Louis Delétraz	Carlin	26	+28.535	12	
12	9	(Germany) Mick Schumacher	Prema Racing	26	+30.908^{1}	15	
13	18	(Colombia) Tatiana Calderón	BWT Arden	26	+32.269	13	
14	3	(Russia) Nikita Mazepin	ART Grand Prix	26	+35.061	17	
15	12	(United States) Juan Manuel Correa	Sauber Junior Team by Charouz	26	+37.852	19	
16	20	(France) Giuliano Alesi	Trident	26	+40.394	20	
17	5	(Brazil) Sérgio Sette Câmara	DAMS	26	+40.538^{2}	18	
18	14	(France) Dorian Boccolacci	Campos Racing	26	+44.210	10	
19	17	(Netherlands) Mahaveer Raghunathan	MP Motorsport	26	+1:08.701	16	
DNF	2	(Japan) Nobuharu Matsushita	Carlin	0	Engine	11	
Fastest lap: Nicholas Latifi (DAMS) — 1:32.444 (on lap 17)

Notes

- ^1 – Mick Schumacher originally finished 8th but was given a five-second time penalty for failing to rejoin the track safely.
- ^2 – Sérgio Sette Câmara originally finished 15th but was given a five-second time penalty for failing to rejoin the track safely.

== Championship standings after the round ==
Drivers' Championship standings

	Pos.	Driver	Points
	1	(Canada) Nicholas Latifi	93
1	2	(Italy) Luca Ghiotto	67
1	3	(Netherlands) Nyck de Vries	63
2	4	(United Kingdom) Jack Aitken	62
7	5	(China) Guanyu Zhou	34

Teams' Championship standings

	Pos.	Team	Points
	1	(France) DAMS	126
1	2	(United Kingdom) UNI-Virtuosi	101
1	3	(Spain) Campos Racing	74
	4	(France) ART Grand Prix	67
2	5	(Czech Republic) Sauber Junior Team by Charouz	32

== See also ==
- 2019 Spanish Grand Prix
- 2019 Barcelona Formula 3 round

Previous round: 2019 Baku Formula 2 round	FIA Formula 2 Championship; 2019 season	Next round: 2019 Monte Carlo Formula 2 round
Previous round: 2018 Barcelona Formula 2 round	Barcelona Formula 2 round	Next round: 2020 Barcelona Formula 2 round
