= 2019 Le Castellet Formula 2 round =

Motor racing event

(France) 2019 Le Castellet Formula 2 round
Round details
- Round 5 of 12 in the 2019 FIA Formula 2 Championship.
- Layout of the Circuit Paul Ricard
- Location: Circuit Paul Ricard; Le Castellet, Provence-Alpes-Côte d'Azur, France
- Course: Permanent racing circuit 5.842 km (3.630 mi)

Feature race
- Date: 22 June 2019
- Laps: 30
Pole position
Driver	(Brazil) Sérgio Sette Câmara	DAMS
Time	1:43.024	
Podium
First	(Netherlands) Nyck de Vries	ART Grand Prix
Second	(Brazil) Sérgio Sette Câmara	DAMS
Third	(United Kingdom) Jack Aitken	Campos Racing
Fastest lap
Driver	(Netherlands) Nyck de Vries	ART Grand Prix
- Time: 1:44.584 (on lap 30)

Sprint race
- Date: 23 June 2019
- Laps: 21
Podium
First	(France) Anthoine Hubert	BWT Arden
Second	(United States) Juan Manuel Correa	Sauber Junior Team by Charouz
Third	(China) Guanyu Zhou	UNI-Virtuosi
Fastest lap
Driver	(Japan) Nobuharu Matsushita	Carlin
- Time: 1:44.702 (on lap 18)

The 2019 Le Castellet Formula 2 round was a pair of motor races for Formula 2 cars that took place on 22 and 23 June 2019 at the Circuit Paul Ricard in Le Castellet, France as part of the FIA Formula 2 Championship. It was the fifth round of the 2019 FIA Formula 2 Championship and was run in support of the 2019 French Grand Prix.

== Background ==
=== Driver changes ===
Jordan King returned to MP Motorsport after Artem Markelov stood in for him at the previous round of the championship in Monaco, allowing him to compete in the 2019 Indianapolis 500.

== Classification ==
=== Qualifying ===
Pos.	No.	Driver	Team	Time	Gap	Grid
1	5	(Brazil) Sérgio Sette Câmara	DAMS	1:43.024	–	1
2	7	(China) Guanyu Zhou	UNI-Virtuosi	1:43.344	+0.320	2
3	15	(United Kingdom) Jack Aitken	Campos Racing	1:43.401	+0.377	3
4	4	(Netherlands) Nyck de Vries	ART Grand Prix	1:43.453	+0.429	4
5	11	(United Kingdom) Callum Ilott	Sauber Junior Team by Charouz	1:43.565	+0.541	5
6	6	(Canada) Nicholas Latifi	DAMS	1:43.650	+0.626	6
7	2	(Japan) Nobuharu Matsushita	Carlin	1:43.763	+0.739	7
8	9	(Germany) Mick Schumacher	Prema Racing	1:43.768	+0.744	8
9	10	(France) Dorian Boccolacci	Campos Racing	1:43.812	+0.788	9
10	10	(Indonesia) Sean Gelael	Prema Racing	1:43.895	+0.871	10
11	8	(Italy) Luca Ghiotto	UNI-Virtuosi	1:43.983	+0.959	14^{1}
12	1	(Switzerland) Louis Delétraz	Carlin	1:44.025	+1.001	11
13	12	(United States) Juan Manuel Correa	Sauber Junior Team by Charouz	1:44.120	+1.096	12
14	21	(Switzerland) Ralph Boschung	Trident	1:44.371	+1.347	13
15	19	(France) Anthoine Hubert	BWT Arden	1:44.612	+1.588	15
16	16	(United Kingdom) Jordan King	MP Motorsport	1:44.882	+1.858	16
17	18	(Colombia) Tatiana Calderón	BWT Arden	1:47.006	+3.982	17
18	17	(Netherlands) Mahaveer Raghunathan	MP Motorsport	1:48.374	+5.350	18^{2}
107% time: 1:50.235
—	20	(France) Giuliano Alesi	Trident	no time	–	PL^{3}
—	3	(Russia) Nikita Mazepin	ART Grand Prix	no time	–	19

Notes

- ^1 – Luca Ghiotto was given a three-place grid penalty for causing a collision at the previous round in Monaco.
- ^2 – Mahaveer Raghunathan was given a three-place grid penalty for leaving the track and gaining an advantage at the previous round in Monaco.
- ^3 – Giuliano Alesi was ordered to start from the pit lane for causing a collision with Louis Delétraz during qualifying.

=== Feature race ===
Pos.	No.	Driver	Team	Laps	Time/Retired	Grid	Points
1	4	(Netherlands) Nyck de Vries	ART Grand Prix	30	1:15:35.425	4	25 (2)
2	5	(Brazil) Sérgio Sette Câmara	DAMS	30	+8.388	1	18 (4)
3	15	(United Kingdom) Jack Aitken	Campos Racing	30	+9.775	3	15
4	7	(China) Guanyu Zhou	UNI-Virtuosi	30	+20.153	2	12
5	6	(Canada) Nicholas Latifi	DAMS	30	+22.599	6	10
6	16	(United Kingdom) Jordan King	MP Motorsport	30	+24.131	16	8
7	12	(United States) Juan Manuel Correa	Sauber Junior Team by Charouz	30	+28.668	12	6
8	19	(France) Anthoine Hubert	BWT Arden	30	+29.959	15	4
9	2	(Japan) Nobuharu Matsushita	Carlin	30	+32.820	7	2
10	20	(France) Giuliano Alesi	Trident	30	+39.757	PL	1
11	18	(Colombia) Tatiana Calderón	BWT Arden	30	+1:09.371	17	
12	17	(Netherlands) Mahaveer Raghunathan	MP Motorsport	29	+1 lap	18	
DNF	8	(Italy) Luca Ghiotto	UNI-Virtuosi	24	Collision damage	14	
DNF	1	(Switzerland) Louis Delétraz	Carlin	22	Engine	11	
DNF	11	(United Kingdom) Callum Ilott	Sauber Junior Team by Charouz	13	Spun off	5	
DNF	14	(France) Dorian Boccolacci	Campos Racing	1	Mechanical	9	
DNF	9	(Germany) Mick Schumacher	Prema Racing	0	Collision	8	
DNF	10	(Indonesia) Sean Gelael	Prema Racing	0	Collision	10	
DNF	21	(Switzerland) Ralph Boschung	Trident	0	Collision	13	
DNF	3	(Russia) Nikita Mazepin	ART Grand Prix	0	Collision	19	
Fastest lap: Nyck de Vries (ART Grand Prix) — 1:44.584 (on lap 30)

=== Sprint race ===
Pos.	No.	Driver	Team	Laps	Time/Retired	Grid	Points
1	19	(France) Anthoine Hubert	BWT Arden	21	37:19.524	1	15
2	12	(United States) Juan Manuel Correa	Sauber Junior Team by Charouz	21	+2.202	2	12
3	7	(China) Guanyu Zhou	UNI-Virtuosi	21	+4.220	5	10
4	15	(United Kingdom) Jack Aitken	Campos Racing	21	+6.131	6	8
5	5	(Brazil) Sérgio Sette Câmara	DAMS	21	+7.788	7	6
6	6	(Canada) Nicholas Latifi	DAMS	21	+10.795	4	4
7	1	(Switzerland) Louis Delétraz	Carlin	21	+13.122	14	2
8	11	(United Kingdom) Callum Ilott	Sauber Junior Team by Charouz	21	+15.407	15	1
9	2	(Japan) Nobuharu Matsushita	Carlin	21	+16.200	9	(2)
10	4	(Netherlands) Nyck de Vries	ART Grand Prix	21	+17.688	8	
11	16	(United Kingdom) Jordan King	MP Motorsport	21	+21.094	3	
12	8	(Italy) Luca Ghiotto	UNI-Virtuosi	21	+26.254	13	
13	14	(France) Dorian Boccolacci	Campos Racing	21	+27.068	16	
14	20	(France) Giuliano Alesi	Trident	21	+31.977	10	
15	21	(Switzerland) Ralph Boschung	Trident	21	+33.601	18	
16	3	(Russia) Nikita Mazepin	ART Grand Prix	21	+33.853^{1}	19	
17	10	(Indonesia) Sean Gelael	Prema Racing	21	+34.431	PL^{2}	
18	17	(Netherlands) Mahaveer Raghunathan	MP Motorsport	21	+1:13.453	12	
19	18	(Colombia) Tatiana Calderón	BWT Arden	18	Spin	11	
DNF	9	(Germany) Mick Schumacher	Prema Racing	14	Puncture	17	
Fastest lap: Nobuharu Matsushita (Carlin) — 1:44.702 (on lap 18)

Notes

- ^1 – Nikita Mazepin was given a five-second time penalty for leaving the track and gaining an advantage.
- ^2 – Sean Gelael was ordered to start from the pit lane for causing a collision with Mick Schumacher during the feature race.

== Championship standings after the round ==
Drivers' Championship standings

	Pos.	Driver	Points
1	1	(Netherlands) Nyck de Vries	121
1	2	(Canada) Nicholas Latifi	109
1	3	(United Kingdom) Jack Aitken	85
2	4	(Brazil) Sérgio Sette Câmara	80
	5	(China) Guanyu Zhou	76

Teams' Championship standings

Pos.	Team	Points
1	(France) DAMS	189
2	(United Kingdom) UNI-Virtuosi	143
3	(France) ART Grand Prix	127
4	(Spain) Campos Racing	115
5	(United Kingdom) Carlin	66

== See also ==
- 2019 French Grand Prix
- 2019 Le Castellet Formula 3 round

Previous round: 2019 Monte Carlo Formula 2 round	FIA Formula 2 Championship; 2019 season	Next round: 2019 Spielberg Formula 2 round
Previous round: 2018 Le Castellet Formula 2 round	Le Castellet Formula 2 round	Next round: 2022 Le Castellet Formula 2 round
