= 2018 Baku Formula 2 round =

(Azerbaijan) 2018 Baku Formula 2 round
Round details
- Round 2 of 12 in the 2018 FIA Formula 2 Championship.
- Layout of the Baku Street Circuit
- Location: Baku Street Circuit, Baku, Azerbaijan
- Course: Temporary street circuit 6.003 km (3.730 mi)

Feature race
- Date: 28 April 2018
- Laps: 29
Pole position
Driver	(Thailand) Alexander Albon	DAMS
Time	1:54.480	
Podium
First	(Thailand) Alexander Albon	DAMS
Second	(United Kingdom) Jack Aitken	ART Grand Prix
Third	(Italy) Antonio Fuoco	Charouz Racing System
Fastest lap
Driver	(Italy) Antonio Fuoco	Charouz Racing System
- Time: 1:57.409 (on lap 23)

Sprint race
- Date: 29 April 2018
- Laps: 21
Podium
First	(United Kingdom) George Russell	ART Grand Prix
Second	(Netherlands) Nyck de Vries	Prema Powerteam
Third	(Canada) Nicholas Latifi	DAMS
Fastest lap
Driver	(United Kingdom) George Russell	ART Grand Prix
- Time: 1:56.981 (on lap 18)

The 2018 Baku FIA Formula 2 round was a pair of motor races for Formula 2 cars that took place on 28 and 29 April 2018 at the Baku Street Circuit in Baku, Azerbaijan as part of the FIA Formula 2 Championship. It was the second round of the 2018 FIA Formula 2 Championship and runs in support of the 2018 Azerbaijan Grand Prix.

== Classification ==
=== Qualifying ===
Pos.	No.	Driver	Team	Time	Gap	Grid
1	5	(Thailand) Alexander Albon	DAMS	1:54.480	–	1
2	19	(United Kingdom) Lando Norris	Carlin	1:54.694	+0.214	2
3	8	(United Kingdom) George Russell	ART Grand Prix	1:54.842	+0.362	3
4	14	(Italy) Luca Ghiotto	Campos Vexatec Racing	1:54.980	+0.500	4
DSQ^{1}	17	(United States) Santino Ferrucci	Trident	1:55.200	+0.720	19
5	18	(Brazil) Sérgio Sette Câmara	Carlin	1:55.212	+0.732	5
6	7	(United Kingdom) Jack Aitken	ART Grand Prix	1:55.236	+0.756	6
7	16	(India) Arjun Maini	Trident	1:55.474	+0.994	7
8	4	(Netherlands) Nyck de Vries	Pertamina Prema Theodore Racing	1:55.728	+1.248	8
9	10	(Switzerland) Ralph Boschung	MP Motorsport	1:55.761	+1.281	9
DSQ^{2}	11	(Germany) Maximilian Günther	BWT Arden	1:55.970	+1.490	17
10	2	(Japan) Tadasuke Makino	Russian Time	1:56.139	+1.659	10
11	9	(Spain) Roberto Merhi	MP Motorsport	1:56.532	+2.052	11
12	21	(Italy) Antonio Fuoco	Charouz Racing System	1:57.090	+2.610	12
13	20	(Switzerland) Louis Delétraz	Charouz Racing System	1:57.105	+2.625	13
DSQ^{2}	12	(Japan) Nirei Fukuzumi	BWT Arden	1:57.351	+2.871	18
14	3	(Indonesia) Sean Gelael	Pertamina Prema Theodore Racing	1:57.508	+3.028	14
15	1	(Russia) Artem Markelov	Russian Time	1:57.604	+3.124	15
16	15	(Israel) Roy Nissany	Campos Vexatec Racing	2:01.902	+7.422	16
NC^{3}	6	(Canada) Nicholas Latifi	DAMS	2:02.970	+8.490	20

Notes

- ^1 – Santino Ferrucci was disqualified for failing to comply with the minimum tyre pressure and was permitted to start the following day's feature race.
- ^2 – Both BWT Arden cars were disqualified for going over the maximum allowable team personnel associated and were permitted to start the following day's feature race.
- ^3 – Nicholas Latifi failed to set a time within the 107% required and raced at the stewards' discretion.

=== Feature race ===
Pos.	No.	Driver	Entrant	Laps	Time/Retired	Grid	Points
1	5	(Thailand) Alexander Albon	DAMS	29	1:03:41.627	1	25 (4)
2	7	(United Kingdom) Jack Aitken	ART Grand Prix	29	+1.992	6	18
3	21	(Italy) Antonio Fuoco	Charouz Racing System	29	+2.958	12	15 (2)
4	18	(Brazil) Sérgio Sette Câmara	Carlin	29	+5.846	5	12
5	6	(Canada) Nicholas Latifi	DAMS	29	+7.099	20	10
6	19	(United Kingdom) Lando Norris	Carlin	29	+7.612	PL^{1}	8
7	10	(Switzerland) Ralph Boschung	MP Motorsport	29	+12.698	9	6
8	9	(Spain) Roberto Merhi	MP Motorsport	29	+14.324	11	4
9	2	(Japan) Tadasuke Makino	Russian Time	29	+15.619	PL^{1}	2
10	3	(Indonesia) Sean Gelael	Pertamina Prema Theodore Racing	29	+20.826	14	1
11	17	(United States) Santino Ferrucci	Trident	29	+45.720	19	
12	8	(United Kingdom) George Russell	ART Grand Prix	29	+59.009	3	
13	12	(Japan) Nirei Fukuzumi	BWT Arden	29	+1:55.517	18	
DNF	4	(Netherlands) Nyck de Vries	Pertamina Prema Theodore Racing	24	Brakes	8	
DNF	1	(Russia) Artem Markelov	Russian Time	20	Engine	15	
DNF	15	(Israel) Roy Nissany	Campos Vexatec Racing	17	Accident	16	
DNF	16	(India) Arjun Maini	Trident	7	Gearbox	7	
DNF	11	(Germany) Maximilian Günther	BWT Arden	6	Suspension	17	
DNF	14	(Italy) Luca Ghiotto	Campos Vexatec Racing	0	Accident	4	
DNF	20	(Switzerland) Louis Delétraz	Charouz Racing System	0	Accident	13	
Fastest Lap: (Italy) Antonio Fuoco (Charouz Racing System) — 1:57.409 (on lap 23)

Notes

- ^1 – Lando Norris and Tadasuke Makino and Jack Aitken started from pit lane after stalling on the grid.

=== Sprint race ===
Pos.	No.	Driver	Entrant	Laps	Time/Retired	Grid	Points
1	8	(United Kingdom) George Russell	ART Grand Prix	21	41:32.101	12	15 (2)
2	4	(Netherlands) Nyck de Vries	Pertamina Prema Theodore Racing	21	+4.774	14	12
3	6	(Canada) Nicholas Latifi	DAMS	21	+5.016	4	10
4	19	(United Kingdom) Lando Norris	Carlin	21	+5.842	3	8
5	16	(India) Arjun Maini	Trident	21	+13.606	17	6
6	17	(United States) Santino Ferrucci	Trident	21	+19.108	11	4
7	9	(Spain) Roberto Merhi	MP Motorsport	21	+22.391	1	2
8	10	(Switzerland) Ralph Boschung	MP Motorsport	21	+24.379	2	1
9	2	(Japan) Tadasuke Makino	Russian Time	21	+25.130	9	
10	20	(Switzerland) Louis Delétraz	Charouz Racing System	21	+46.561	20	
11	7	(United Kingdom) Jack Aitken	ART Grand Prix	21	+1:20.531	7	
12	12	(Japan) Nirei Fukuzumi	BWT Arden	21	+1:27.942	13	
13	5	(Thailand) Alexander Albon	DAMS	21	+1:33.104	8	
14	14	(Italy) Luca Ghiotto	Campos Vexatec Racing	20	+1 lap	19	
15	11	(Germany) Maximilian Günther	BWT Arden	18	Transmission	18	
DNF	3	(Indonesia) Sean Gelael	Pertamina Prema Theodore Racing	11	Accident	10	
DNF	15	(Israel) Roy Nissany	Campos Vexatec Racing	2	Gearbox	16	
DNF	1	(Russia) Artem Markelov	Russian Time	1	Engine	15	
DNS	21	(Italy) Antonio Fuoco	Charouz Racing System	0	Electrical	6	
DSQ^{1}	18	(Brazil) Sérgio Sette Câmara	Carlin	21	Disqualified	5	
Fastest lap: (United Kingdom) George Russell (ART Grand Prix) — 1:56.891 (on lap 18)

Notes

- ^1 – Sérgio Sette Câmara was disqualified as a result of having insufficient fuel to return to the pits.

== Championship standings after the round ==
Drivers' Championship standings

	Pos.	Driver	Points
	1	(United Kingdom) Lando Norris	55
4	2	(Thailand) Alexander Albon	41
	3	(Brazil) Sérgio Sette Câmara	40
2	4	(Russia) Artem Markelov	30
	5	(Netherlands) Nyck de Vries	28

Teams' Championship standings

	Pos.	Entrant	Points
	1	(United Kingdom) Carlin	95
3	2	(France) DAMS	61
3	3	(France) ART Grand Prix	47
1	4	(Italy) Pertamina Prema Theodore Racing	35
3	5	(Russia) Russian Time	32

== Notes ==
Previous round: 2018 Bahrain FIA Formula 2 round	FIA Formula 2 Championship; 2018 season	Next round: 2018 Barcelona FIA Formula 2 round
Previous round: 2017 Baku FIA Formula 2 round	Baku FIA Formula 2 round	Next round: 2019 Baku FIA Formula 2 round
