= 2020 Sakhir Formula 2 round =

Motor racing competition

(Bahrain) 2020 Sakhir Formula 2 round
Round details
- Round 11 of 12 in the 2020 FIA Formula 2 Championship.
- Layout of the Bahrain International Circuit
- Location: Bahrain International Circuit, Sakhir, Bahrain
- Course: Permanent racing facility 5.406 km (3.359 mi)

Feature race
- Date: 28 November 2020
- Laps: 32
Pole position
Driver	(United Kingdom) Callum Ilott	UNI-Virtuosi
Time	1:41.479	
Podium
First	(Brazil) Felipe Drugovich	MP Motorsport
Second	(United Kingdom) Callum Ilott	UNI-Virtuosi
Third	(India) Jehan Daruvala	Carlin
Fastest lap
Driver	(Italy) Luca Ghiotto	Hitech Grand Prix
- Time: 1:46.155 (on lap 15)

Sprint race
- Date: 29 November 2020
- Laps: 23
Podium
First	(Russia) Robert Shwartzman	Prema Racing
Second	(Russia) Nikita Mazepin	Hitech Grand Prix
Third	(Switzerland) Louis Delétraz	Charouz Racing System
Fastest lap
Driver	(Switzerland) Louis Delétraz	Charouz Racing System
- Time: 1:45.114 (on lap 10)

The 2020 Sakhir Formula 2 round was a pair of motor races for Formula 2 cars that took place on 28-29 November 2020 at the Bahrain International Circuit in Sakhir, Bahrain as part of the FIA Formula 2 Championship. It was the penultimate race of the 2020 FIA Formula 2 Championship and ran in support of the 2020 Bahrain Grand Prix.

== Impact of the COVID-19 pandemic ==
The races was originally due to take place on 21-22 March 2020 as the opening round of the championship, but the COVID-19 pandemic led to event organisers initially announcing that no spectators would be permitted to attend the race. On 13 March 2020 the race was indefinitely postponed. It was the second time in Formula Two, then called GP2, history that the Bahrain Grand Prix was postponed after the 2011 Bahrain Grand Prix, which was ultimately cancelled. In its place, an online virtual Grand Prix was held on the original race date featuring racing drivers, celebrities, and e-sport racers. The virtual race was won by Guanyu Zhou. In August, the Bahrain Grand Prix was rescheduled to 29 November. Due to a surge of COVID-19 cases in the country, organisers announced that the Grand Prix would take place behind closed doors. Local authorities gave special dispensation to allow local health workers to attend with their families.

== Report ==
Callum Ilott took pole for the feature race, 0.391 seconds ahead of Felipe Drugovich. Effective tyre management from Drugovich would help him to achieve his first feature race win, ahead of Ilott. Jehan Daruvala would complete the podium after a long battle with Mick Schumacher.

Robert Shwartzman took his fourth win, after starting from the reverse-grid pole. The podium was completed by Nikita Mazepin and Louis Delétraz.

== Classification ==
=== Qualifying ===
Pos.	No.	Driver	Team	Time	Gap	Grid
1	4	(United Kingdom) Callum Ilott	UNI-Virtuosi	1:41.479		1
2	15	(Brazil) Felipe Drugovich	MP Motorsport	1:41.870	+0.391	2
3	2	(United Kingdom) Dan Ticktum	DAMS	1:42.047	+0.568	3
4	5	(New Zealand) Marcus Armstrong	ART Grand Prix	1:42.052	+0.573	4
5	3	(China) Guanyu Zhou	UNI-Virtuosi	1:42.065	+0.586	5
6	14	(France) Giuliano Alesi	MP Motorsport	1:42.074	+0.595	6
7	24	(Russia) Nikita Mazepin	Hitech Grand Prix	1:42.139	+0.660	7
8	8	(India) Jehan Daruvala	Carlin	1:42.191	+0.712	8
9	6	(Denmark) Christian Lundgaard	ART Grand Prix	1:42.259	+0.780	9
10	20	(Germany) Mick Schumacher	Prema Racing	1:42.283	+0.804	10
11	11	(Switzerland) Louis Delétraz	Charouz Racing System	1:42.316	+0.837	11
12	22	(Israel) Roy Nissany	Trident	1:42.338	+0.859	12
13	12	(Brazil) Pedro Piquet	Charouz Racing System	1:42.481	+1.002	13
14	21	(Russia) Robert Shwartzman	Prema Racing	1:42.654	+1.175	14
15	9	(United Kingdom) Jack Aitken	Campos Racing	1:42.848	+1.369	15
16	17	(France) Théo Pourchaire	BWT HWA Racelab	1:42.967	+1.488	16
17	23	(Japan) Marino Sato	Trident	1:43.170	+1.691	17
18	1	(Indonesia) Sean Gelael	DAMS	1:43.191	+1.712	18
19	10	(Brazil) Guilherme Samaia	Campos Racing	1:43.286	+1.807	19
20	25	(Italy) Luca Ghiotto	Hitech Grand Prix	1:43.366	+1.887	21^{1}
21	16	(Russia) Artem Markelov	BWT HWA Racelab	1:44.019	+2.540	20
107% time: 1:48.583
—	7	(Japan) Yuki Tsunoda	Carlin	1:57.048	+15.569	22

Notes:

- ^1 – Luca Ghiotto received a three-place grid drop for the Feature Race due to impeding Louis Delétraz during Qualifying.

=== Feature race ===
Pos.	No.	Driver	Entrant	Laps	Time/Retired	Grid	Points
1	15	(Brazil) Felipe Drugovich	MP Motorsport	32	58:24.004	2	25
2	4	(United Kingdom) Callum Ilott	UNI-Virtuosi	32	+14.833	1	18 (4)
3	8	(India) Jehan Daruvala	Carlin	32	+19.376	8	15
4	20	(Germany) Mick Schumacher	Prema Racing	32	+20.270	10	12
5	24	(Russia) Nikita Mazepin	Hitech Grand Prix	32	+28.293	7	10
6	7	(Japan) Yuki Tsunoda	Carlin	32	+28.590	22	8 (2)
7	5	(New Zealand) Marcus Armstrong	ART Grand Prix	32	+31.361	4	6
8	21	(Russia) Robert Shwartzman	Prema Racing	32	+43.868	14	4
9	2	(United Kingdom) Dan Ticktum	DAMS	32	+46.959	3	2
10	9	(United Kingdom) Jack Aitken	Campos Racing	32	+47.327	15	1
11	12	(Brazil) Pedro Piquet	Charouz Racing System	32	+49.174	13	
12	25	(Italy) Luca Ghiotto	Hitech Grand Prix	32	+49.294	21	
13	1	(Indonesia) Sean Gelael	DAMS	32	+50.590	8	
14	3	(China) Guanyu Zhou	UNI-Virtuosi	32	+53.775	5	
15	22	(Israel) Roy Nissany	Trident Racing	32	+53.816	12	
16	11	(Switzerland) Louis Delétraz	Charouz Racing System	32	+55.957	11	
17	14	(France) Giuliano Alesi	MP Motorsport	32	+1:01.488	6	
18	17	(France) Théo Pourchaire	BWT HWA Racelab	32	+1:01.839	16	
19	6	(Denmark) Christian Lundgaard	ART Grand Prix	32	+1:03.086	9	
20	23	(Japan) Marino Sato	Trident Racing	32	+1:05.576	17	
21	10	(Brazil) Guilherme Samaia	Campos Racing	32	+1:06.756	19	
22	16	(Russia) Artem Markelov	BWT HWA Racelab	32	+1:16.019	20	
Fastest lap： (Japan) Yuki Tsunoda (Carlin) — 1:46.316 (lap 21)

=== Sprint race ===
Pos.	No.	Driver	Entrant	Laps	Time/Retired	Grid	Points
1	21	(Russia) Robert Shwartzman	Prema Racing	23	43:15.992	1	15
2	24	(Russia) Nikita Mazepin	Hitech Grand Prix	23	+5.283	4	12
3	11	(Switzerland) Louis Delétraz	Charouz Racing System	23	+6.472	16	10 (2)
4	5	(New Zealand) Marcus Armstrong	ART Grand Prix	23	+10.655	2	8
5	3	(China) Guanyu Zhou	UNI-Virtuosi	23	+15.133	14	6
6	6	(Denmark) Christian Lundgaard	ART Grand Prix	23	+18.564	19	4
7	20	(Germany) Mick Schumacher	Prema Racing	23	+20.741	5	2
8	15	(Brazil) Felipe Drugovich	MP Motorsport	23	+23.510	8	1
9	22	(Israel) Roy Nissany	Trident Racing	23	+25.352	15	
10	16	(Russia) Artem Markelov	BWT HWA Racelab	23	+31.150	22	
11	23	(Japan) Marino Sato	Trident Racing	23	+31.848	20	
12	2	(United Kingdom) Dan Ticktum	DAMS	23	+39.824	9	
13	14	(France) Giuliano Alesi	MP Motorsport	23	+43.904	17	
14	1	(Indonesia) Sean Gelael	DAMS	23	+44.427	13	
15	7	(Japan) Yuki Tsunoda	Carlin	23	+49.148	3	
16	4	(United Kingdom) Callum Ilott	UNI-Virtuosi	23	+1:03.463	7	
17	9	(United Kingdom) Jack Aitken	Campos Racing	22	Collision damage	10	
18	10	(Brazil) Guilherme Samaia	Campos Racing	22	Collision damage	21	
19	12	(Brazil) Pedro Piquet	Charouz Racing System	21	Mechanical	11	
DNF	25	(Italy) Luca Ghiotto	Hitech Grand Prix	9	Mechanical	12	
DNF	8	(India) Jehan Daruvala	Carlin	7	Collision	6	
DNF	17	(France) Théo Pourchaire	BWT HWA Racelab	5	Fire extinguisher	18	
Fastest lap： (Switzerland) Louis Delétraz (Charouz Racing System) — 1:45.114（lap 10)

== Standings after the event ==
Drivers' Championship standings

	Pos.	Driver	Points
	1	(Germany) Mick Schumacher	205
	2	(United Kingdom) Callum Ilott	191
3	3	(Russia) Nikita Mazepin	162
1	4	(Russia) Robert Shwartzman	159
2	5	(Japan) Yuki Tsunoda	157

Teams' Championship standings

	Pos.	Team	Points
	1	(Italy) Prema Racing	364
	2	(United Kingdom) UNI-Virtuosi	316.5
	3	(United Kingdom) Hitech Grand Prix	266
1	4	(United Kingdom) Carlin	208
1	5	(France) ART Grand Prix	201

- Note: Only the top five positions are included for both sets of standings.

== See also ==
- 2020 Bahrain Grand Prix

Previous round: 2020 Sochi Formula 2 round	FIA Formula 2 Championship; 2020 season	Next round: 2020 2nd Sakhir Formula 2 round
Previous round: 2019 Sakhir Formula 2 round	Sakhir Formula 2 round	Next round: 2020 2nd Sakhir Formula 2 round
