= 2018 Barcelona Formula 2 round =

Motor racing competition

(Spain) 2018 Barcelona Formula 2 round
Round details
- Round 3 of 12 in the 2018 FIA Formula 2 Championship.
- Layout of the Circuit de Barcelona-Catalunya
- Location: Circuit de Barcelona-Catalunya, Montmeló, Catalonia, Spain
- Course: Permanent racing facility 4.655 km (2.892 mi)

Feature race
- Date: 12 May 2018
- Laps: 36
Pole position
Driver	(Thailand) Alexander Albon	DAMS
Time	1:28.142	
Podium
First	(United Kingdom) George Russell	ART Grand Prix
Second	(Netherlands) Nyck de Vries	Pertamina Prema Theodore Racing
Third	(United Kingdom) Lando Norris	Carlin
Fastest lap
Driver	(Canada) Nicholas Latifi	DAMS
- Time: 1:30.039 (on lap 34)

Sprint race
- Date: 13 May 2018
- Laps: 26
Podium
First	(United Kingdom) Jack Aitken	ART Grand Prix
Second	(Thailand) Alexander Albon	DAMS
Third	(United Kingdom) Lando Norris	Carlin
Fastest lap
Driver	(United Kingdom) George Russell	ART Grand Prix
- Time: 1:30.987 (on lap 26)

The 2018 Barcelona FIA Formula 2 round was a pair of motor races for Formula 2 cars that took place on 12 and 13 May 2018 at the Circuit de Barcelona-Catalunya in Catalonia, Spain as part of the FIA Formula 2 Championship. It was the third round of the 2018 FIA Formula 2 Championship and ran in support of the 2018 Spanish Grand Prix.

The race weekend also saw history making from ART Grand Prix, as the French outfit managed to secure race victories in both races of the weekend to become the first team in modern Formula 2 to do so; with George Russell winning the Feature Race and Jack Aitken winning the Sprint Race respectively.

== Classification ==
=== Qualifying ===
Pos.	No.	Driver	Team	Time	Gap	Grid
1	5	(Thailand) Alexander Albon	DAMS	1:28.142	–	1
2	4	(Netherlands) Nyck de Vries	Pertamina Prema Theodore Racing	1:28.369	+0.227	2
3	14	(Italy) Luca Ghiotto	Campos Vexatec Racing	1:28.400	+0.258	3
4	8	(United Kingdom) George Russell	ART Grand Prix	1:28.524	+0.382	4
5	7	(United Kingdom) Jack Aitken	ART Grand Prix	1:28.579	+0.437	5
6	6	(Canada) Nicholas Latifi	DAMS	1:28.605	+0.463	6
7	2	(Japan) Tadasuke Makino	Russian Time	1:28.620	+0.478	7
8	19	(United Kingdom) Lando Norris	Carlin	1:28.923	+0.781	8
9	10	(Switzerland) Ralph Boschung	MP Motorsport	1:28.970	+0.828	9
10	9	(Spain) Roberto Merhi	MP Motorsport	1:29.081	+0.939	10
11	21	(Italy) Antonio Fuoco	Charouz Racing System	1:29.130	+0.988	11
12	20	(Switzerland) Louis Delétraz	Charouz Racing System	1:29.136	+0.994	12
13	11	(Germany) Maximilian Günther	BWT Arden	1:29.143	+1.001	13
14	18	(Brazil) Sérgio Sette Câmara	Carlin	1:29.256	+1.114	14
15	15	(Israel) Roy Nissany	Campos Vexatec Racing	1:29.284	+1.142	15
16	3	(Indonesia) Sean Gelael	Pertamina Prema Theodore Racing	1:29.307	+1.165	16
17	12	(Japan) Nirei Fukuzumi	BWT Arden	1:29.376	+1.234	17
18	16	(India) Arjun Maini	Trident	1:29.407	+1.265	18
19	1	(Russia) Artem Markelov	Russian Time	1:29.585	+1.433	19
20	17	(United States) Santino Ferrucci	Trident	1:30.440	+2.298	20

=== Feature race ===
Pos.	No.	Driver	Team	Laps	Time/Retired	Grid	Points
1	8	(United Kingdom) George Russell	ART Grand Prix	36	1:02:58.902	4	25
2	4	(Netherlands) Nyck de Vries	Pertamina Prema Theodore Racing	36	+1.036	2	18
3	19	(United Kingdom) Lando Norris	Carlin	36	+1.760	8	15
4	14	(Italy) Luca Ghiotto	Campos Vexatec Racing	36	+5.714	3	12
5	5	(Thailand) Alexander Albon	DAMS	36	+6.098	1	10 (4)
6	7	(United Kingdom) Jack Aitken	ART Grand Prix	36	+8.214	5	8
7	18	(Brazil) Sérgio Sette Câmara	Carlin	36	+9.830	14	6
8	1	(Russia) Artem Markelov	Russian Time	36	+20.857	19	4 (2)
9	2	(Japan) Tadasuke Makino	Russian Time	36	+23.950	7	2
10	21	(Italy) Antonio Fuoco	Charouz Racing System	36	+25.289	11	1
11	12	(Japan) Nirei Fukuzumi	BWT Arden	36	+29.150	17	
12	15	(Israel) Roy Nissany	Campos Vexatec Racing	36	+36.719	15	
13	9	(Spain) Roberto Merhi	MP Motorsport	36	+58.771	10	
14	6	(Canada) Nicholas Latifi	DAMS	35	+1 lap	6	
DNF	3	(Indonesia) Sean Gelael	Pertamina Prema Theodore Racing	27	Collision	16	
DNF	20	(Switzerland) Louis Delétraz	Charouz Racing System	27	Puncture	12	
DNF	16	(India) Arjun Maini	Trident	10	Accident	18	
DNF	10	(Switzerland) Ralph Boschung	MP Motorsport	5	Accident	9	
DNF	11	(Germany) Maximilian Günther	BWT Arden	0	Spun off	13	
DNS	17	(United States) Santino Ferrucci	Trident	0	Fuel system	–	
Fastest Lap: Nicholas Latifi (DAMS) — 1:30.039 (on lap 34)^{1}

Notes

- ^1 – Nicholas Latifi set the fastest lap in the race but because he finished outside the top 10, the two bonus points for fastest lap went to Artem Markelov as he set the fastest lap inside the top 10 finishers.

=== Sprint race ===
Pos.	No.	Driver	Team	Laps	Time/Retired	Grid	Points
1	7	(United Kingdom) Jack Aitken	ART Grand Prix	26	45:21.511	3	15
2	5	(Thailand) Alexander Albon	DAMS	26	+1.550	4	12
3	19	(United Kingdom) Lando Norris	Carlin	26	+2.864	6	10
4	8	(United Kingdom) George Russell	ART Grand Prix	26	+8.106	8	8 (2)
5	14	(Italy) Luca Ghiotto	Campos Vexatec Racing	26	+11.109	5	6
6	21	(Italy) Antonio Fuoco	Charouz Racing System	26	+13.702	10	4
7	3	(Indonesia) Sean Gelael	Pertamina Prema Thedore Racing	26	+14.837	15	2
8	6	(Canada) Nicholas Latifi	DAMS	26	+28.678	14	1
9	1	(Russia) Artem Markelov	Russian Time	26	+29.065	1	
10	20	(Switzerland) Louis Delétraz	Charouz Racing System	26	+29.437	16	
11	17	(United States) Santino Ferrucci	Trident	26	+30.996	20	
12	11	(Germany) Maximilian Günther	BWT Arden	26	+32.428	19	
13	16	(India) Arjun Maini	Trident	26	+33.236	17	
14	15	(Israel) Roy Nissany	Campos Vexatec Racing	26	+35.672	15	
DNF	9	(Spain) Roberto Merhi	MP Motorsport	22	Transmission	13	
DNF	10	(Switzerland) Ralph Boschung	MP Motorsport	20	Puncture	18	
DNF	18	(Brazil) Sérgio Sette Câmara	Carlin	12	Electrical	2	
DNF	2	(Japan) Tadasuke Makino	Russian Time	4	Collision	9	
DNF	12	(Japan) Nirei Fukuzumi	BWT Arden	4	Collision	11	
DNF	4	(Netherlands) Nyck de Vries	Pertamina Prema Theodore Racing	1	Spun off	7	
Fastest lap: George Russell (ART Grand Prix) — 1:30.987 (on lap 26)

== Championship standings after the round ==
Drivers' Championship standings

	Pos.	Driver	Points
	1	(United Kingdom) Lando Norris	80
	2	(Thailand) Alexander Albon	67
3	3	(United Kingdom) George Russell	62
1	4	(Netherlands) Nyck de Vries	46
2	5	(Brazil) Sérgio Sette Câmara	46

Teams' Championship standings

	Pos.	Team	Points
	1	(United Kingdom) Carlin	126
1	2	(France) ART Grand Prix	105
1	3	(France) DAMS	88
	4	(Italy) Pertamina Prema Theodore Racing	57
	5	(Russia) Russian Time	40

== See also ==
- 2018 Spanish Grand Prix
- 2018 Barcelona GP3 Series round

Previous round: 2018 Baku Formula 2 round	FIA Formula 2 Championship; 2018 season	Next round: 2018 Monte Carlo Formula 2 round
Previous round: 2017 Barcelona Formula 2 round	Barcelona Formula 2 round	Next round: 2019 Barcelona Formula 2 round
