= 2019 Baku Formula 2 round =

(Azerbaijan) 2019 Baku Formula 2 round
Round details
- Round 2 of 12 in the 2019 FIA Formula 2 Championship.
- Layout of the Baku Street Circuit
- Location: Baku Street Circuit, Baku, Azerbaijan
- Course: Temporary street circuit 6.003 km (3.730 mi)

Feature race
- Date: 27 April 2019
- Laps: 26
Pole position
Driver	(Japan) Nobuharu Matsushita	Carlin
Time	1:54.555	
Podium
First	(United Kingdom) Jack Aitken	Campos Racing
Second	(Netherlands) Nyck de Vries	ART Grand Prix
Third	(United Kingdom) Jordan King	MP Motorsport
Fastest lap
Driver	(Japan) Nobuharu Matsushita	Carlin
- Time: 1:56.778 (on lap 25)

Sprint race
- Date: 28 April 2019
- Laps: 19
Podium
First	(Canada) Nicholas Latifi	DAMS
Second	(United States) Juan Manuel Correa	Sauber Junior Team by Charouz
Third	(United Kingdom) Jack Aitken	Campos Racing
Fastest lap
Driver	(Brazil) Sérgio Sette Câmara	DAMS
- Time: 1:57.941 (on lap 19)

The 2019 Baku FIA Formula 2 round was a pair of motor races for Formula 2 cars that took place on 27 and 28 April 2019 at the Baku Street Circuit in Baku, Azerbaijan as part of the FIA Formula 2 Championship. It was the second round of the 2019 FIA Formula 2 Championship and was run in support of the 2019 Azerbaijan Grand Prix.

== Classification ==
=== Qualifying ===
Pos.	No.	Driver	Team	Time	Gap	Grid
1	2	(Japan) Nobuharu Matsushita	Carlin	1:54.555	–	1
2	4	(Netherlands) Nyck de Vries	ART Grand Prix	1:54.999	+0.444	2
3	8	(Italy) Luca Ghiotto	UNI-Virtuosi	1:55.037	+0.482	3
4	5	(Brazil) Sérgio Sette Câmara	DAMS	1:55.677	+1.122	4
5	16	(United Kingdom) Jordan King	MP Motorsport	1:55.704	+1.149	5
6	9	(Germany) Mick Schumacher	Prema Racing	1:55.797	+1.242	6
7	6	(Canada) Nicholas Latifi	DAMS	1:55.835	+1.280	7
8	15	(United Kingdom) Jack Aitken	Campos Racing	1:55.949	+1.394	8
9	19	(France) Anthoine Hubert	BWT Arden	1:56.138	+1.583	9
10	21	(Switzerland) Ralph Boschung	Trident	1:56.153	+1.598	10
11	11	(United Kingdom) Callum Ilott	Sauber Junior Team by Charouz	1:56.215	+1.660	11
12	1	(Switzerland) Louis Delétraz	Carlin	1:56.326	+1.771	12
13	7	(China) Guanyu Zhou	UNI-Virtuosi	1:56.454	+1.899	13
14	20	(France) Giuliano Alesi	Trident	1:56.555	+2.000	14
15	3	(Russia) Nikita Mazepin	ART Grand Prix	1:56.568	+2.013	15
16	14	(France) Dorian Boccolacci	Campos Racing	1:56.653	+2.098	16
17	12	(United States) Juan Manuel Correa	Sauber Junior Team by Charouz	1:56.936	+2.381	17
18	18	(Colombia) Tatiana Calderón	BWT Arden	1:58.164	+3.609	18
19	17	(Netherlands) Mahaveer Raghunathan	MP Motorsport	2:00.747	+6.192	PL^{1}
107% time: 2:02.573
—	10	(Indonesia) Sean Gelael	Prema Racing	no time	–	19^{2}

Notes

- ^1 – Mahaveer Raghunathan was given a ten-place grid penalty for taking the chequered flag twice at the previous round in Bahrain. He was also ordered to start from the pit lane for failing to stop for the official weight check.
- ^2 – Sean Gelael failed to set a lap time during qualifying but was given permission to race by the stewards.

=== Feature race ===
Pos.	No.	Driver	Entrant	Laps	Time/Retired	Grid	Points
1	15	(United Kingdom) Jack Aitken	Campos Racing	26	1:02:27.628	8	25 (2)^{2}
2	4	(Netherlands) Nyck de Vries	ART Grand Prix	26	+2.221	2	18
3	16	(United Kingdom) Jordan King	MP Motorsport	26	+4.134	5	15
4	6	(Canada) Nicholas Latifi	DAMS	26	+4.604	7	12
5	14	(France) Dorian Boccolacci	Campos Racing	26	+9.499	16	10
6	10	(Indonesia) Sean Gelael	Prema Racing	26	+12.313	19	8
7	12	(United States) Juan Manuel Correa	Sauber Junior Team by Charouz	26	+13.154	17	6
8	3	(Russia) Nikita Mazepin	ART Grand Prix	26	+13.676	15	4
9	8	(Italy) Luca Ghiotto^{1}	UNI-Virtuosi	26	+14.613^{1}	3	2
10	19	(France) Anthoine Hubert	BWT Arden	26	+18.200	9	1
11	17	(Netherlands) Mahaveer Raghunathan	MP Motorsport	26	+29.798	PL	
12	21	(Switzerland) Ralph Boschung	Trident	26	+1:00.507	10	
13	2	(Japan) Nobuharu Matsushita	Carlin	25	+1 lap	1	(4)^{2}
DNF	5	(Brazil) Sérgio Sette Câmara	DAMS	19	Brakes/Accident	4	
DNF	1	(Switzerland) Louis Delétraz	Carlin	19	Accident damage	12	
DNF	11	(United Kingdom) Callum Ilott	Sauber Junior Team by Charouz	18	Brakes	11	
DNF	18	(Colombia) Tatiana Calderón	BWT Arden	16	Hydraulics	18	
DNF	7	(China) Guanyu Zhou	UNI-Virtuosi	16	Accident	13	
DNF	9	(Germany) Mick Schumacher	Prema Racing	7	Spun off	6	
DNF	20	(France) Giuliano Alesi	Trident	0	Accident	14	
Fastest lap: Nobuharu Matsushita (Carlin) — 1:56.778 (on lap 25)^{2}

Notes

- ^1 – Luca Ghiotto finished the race in 6th but was given a 5 seconds time penalty after the race for causing a collision with Sérgio Sette Câmara during the restart of a late Safety Car period.
- ^2 – Nobuharu Matsushita set the fastest lap, but finished outside the top 10, so he was ineligible to score points for the fastest lap. The two bonus points for the fastest lap were awarded to Jack Aitken as he set the fastest lap of those who finished inside the top 10 with a time of 1:56.961.

=== Sprint race ===
Pos.	No.	Driver	Entrant	Laps	Time/Retired	Grid	Points
1	6	(Canada) Nicholas Latifi	DAMS	19	48:43.284	4	15
2	12	(United States) Juan Manuel Correa	Sauber Junior Team by Charouz	19	+0.961	2	12
3	15	(United Kingdom) Jack Aitken	Campos Racing	19	+1.521	8	10
4	4	(Netherlands) Nyck de Vries	ART Grand Prix	19	+2.602	7	8
5	9	(Germany) Mick Schumacher	Prema Racing	19	+3.247	19	6
6	5	(Brazil) Sérgio Sette Câmara	DAMS	19	+4.060	14	4 (2)^{1}
7	14	(France) Dorian Boccolacci	Campos Racing	19	+6.503	6^{2}	2
8	10	(Indonesia) Sean Gelael	Prema Racing	19	+7.724	3	1
9	11	(United Kingdom) Callum Ilott	Sauber Junior Team by Charouz	19	+7.729	16	
10	7	(China) Guanyu Zhou	UNI-Virtuosi	19	+9.293	18	
11	19	(France) Anthoine Hubert	BWT Arden	19	+11.074	10	
12	2	(Japan) Nobuharu Matsushita	Carlin	19	+11.235	13	
13	17	(Netherlands) Mahaveer Raghunathan	MP Motorsport	19	+17.584	11	
DNF	8	(Italy) Luca Ghiotto	UNI-Virtuosi	12	Accident	9	
DNF	16	(United Kingdom) Jordan King	MP Motorsport	12	Collision	5	
DNF	3	(Russia) Nikita Mazepin	ART Grand Prix	12	Collision	1	
DNF	20	(France) Giuliano Alesi	Trident	8	Accident	20	
DNF	21	(Switzerland) Ralph Boschung	Trident	0	Collision	12	
DNF	1	(Switzerland) Louis Delétraz	Carlin	0	Collision	15	
DNF	18	(Colombia) Tatiana Calderón	BWT Arden	0	Collision damage	17	
Fastest lap: Luca Ghiotto (UNI-Virtuosi) — 1:57.757 (on lap 6)^{1}

Notes

- ^1 – Luca Ghiotto set the fastest lap, but did not finish the race, so he was ineligible to score points for the fastest lap. The two bonus points for the fastest lap were awarded to Sérgio Sette Câmara as he set the fastest lap of those finishing in the top 10 with a time of 1:57.941.
- ^2 – Dorian Boccolacci was due to start the sprint race in 4th but was given a two-place grid penalty for failing to follow the race director's instructions.

== Championship standings after the round ==
Drivers' Championship standings

	Pos.	Driver	Points
1	1	(Canada) Nicholas Latifi	62
7	2	(United Kingdom) Jack Aitken	43
2	3	(Italy) Luca Ghiotto	39
2	4	(Netherlands) Nyck de Vries	38
2	5	(Brazil) Sérgio Sette Câmara	33

Teams' Championship standings

	Pos.	Entrant	Points
	1	(France) DAMS	95
5	2	(Spain) Campos Racing	55
1	3	(United Kingdom) UNI-Virtuosi	50
1	4	(France) ART Grand Prix	42
1	5	(Italy) Prema Racing	23

Previous round: 2019 Bahrain FIA Formula 2 round	FIA Formula 2 Championship; 2019 season	Next round: 2019 Barcelona FIA Formula 2 round
Previous round: 2018 Baku FIA Formula 2 round	Baku FIA Formula 2 round	Next round: 2021 Baku Formula 2 round
