= Artem Markelov =

Russian racing driver (born 1994)

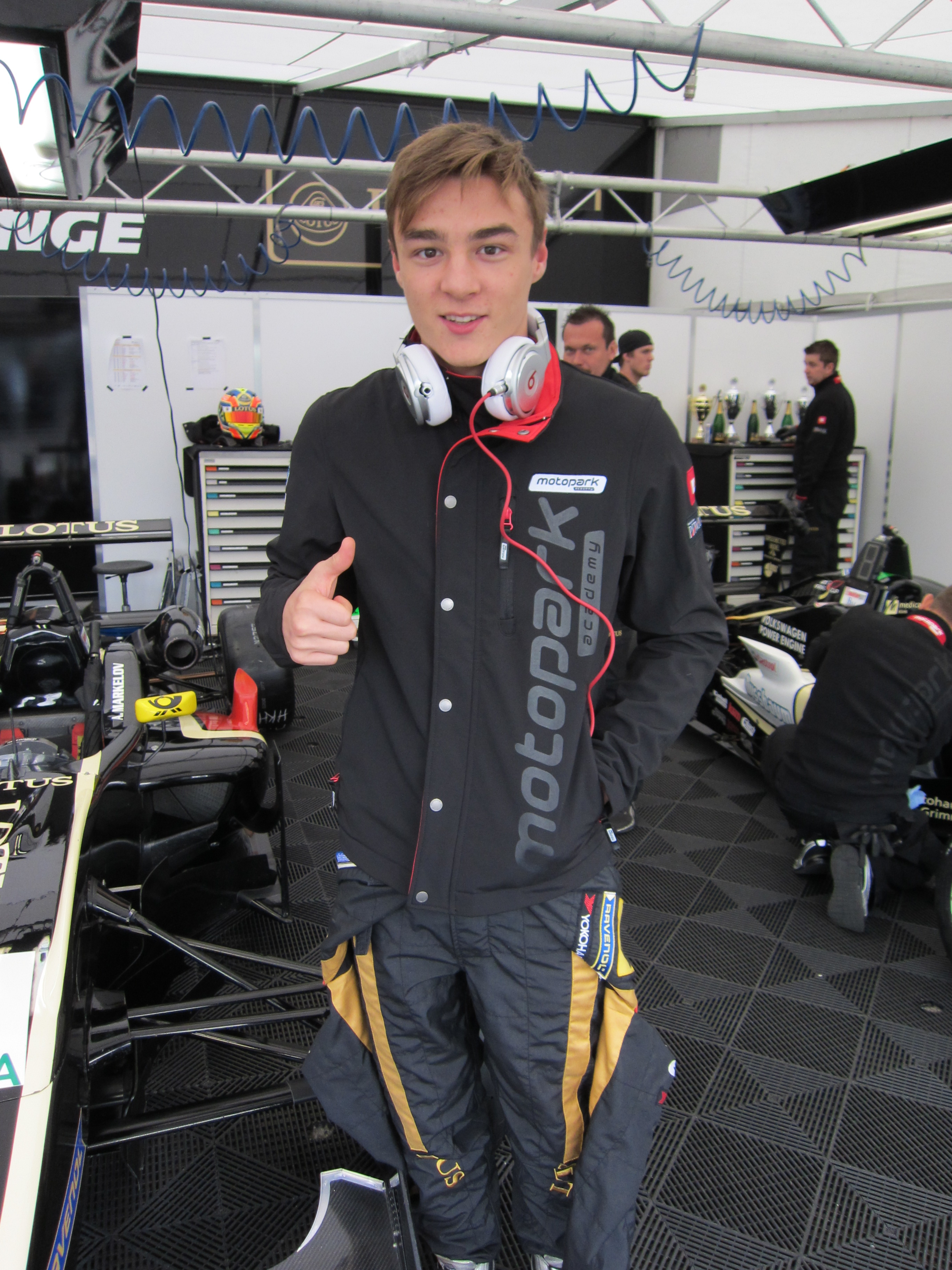
- Markelov in 2013
- Nationality: (Russia) Russian
- Born: Artem Valeryevich Markelov; 10 September 1994 (age 32) Moscow, Russia

FIA Formula 2 Championship career
- Debut season: 2017
- Car number: 16
- Former teams: Russian Time, BWT Arden, MP Motorsport, BWT HWA Racelab
- Starts: 75 (76 entries)
- Wins: 8
- Podiums: 14
- Poles: 1
- Fastest laps: 5
- Best finish: 2nd in 2017

Previous series
- 2014–16 2012–13 2011 2011: GP2 Series; German Formula Three; Formula 3 Euro Series; ADAC Formel Masters

Artem Valeryevich Markelov (Russian: Артём Вале́рьевич Марке́лов, IPA: [ɐrˈtʲɵm vɐˈlʲerʲjɪvʲɪtɕ mɐrˈkʲeləf]; born 10 September 1994) is a Russian retired racing driver who last competed in the FIA Formula 2 Championship for HWA Team in 2020.

== Career ==
=== Karting ===
Born in Moscow, Markelov began karting in 2006 and raced mostly in his native Russia for the majority of his karting career, working his way up through the junior ranks to progress into the KF2 category by 2010.

=== ADAC Formel Masters ===
In 2011, Markelov moved into open-wheel racing, competing in ADAC Formel Masters with Motopark Academy, taking eleven podiums in twenty-three races, including one win at Red Bull Ring. As a result, Markelov finished in fourth place in the final championship standings.

=== Formula Three ===
==== 2011 ====
During the 2011 season, Markelov made his Formula Three debut, with Motopark, in the Hockenheimring round of the Formula 3 Euro Series.

==== 2012 ====
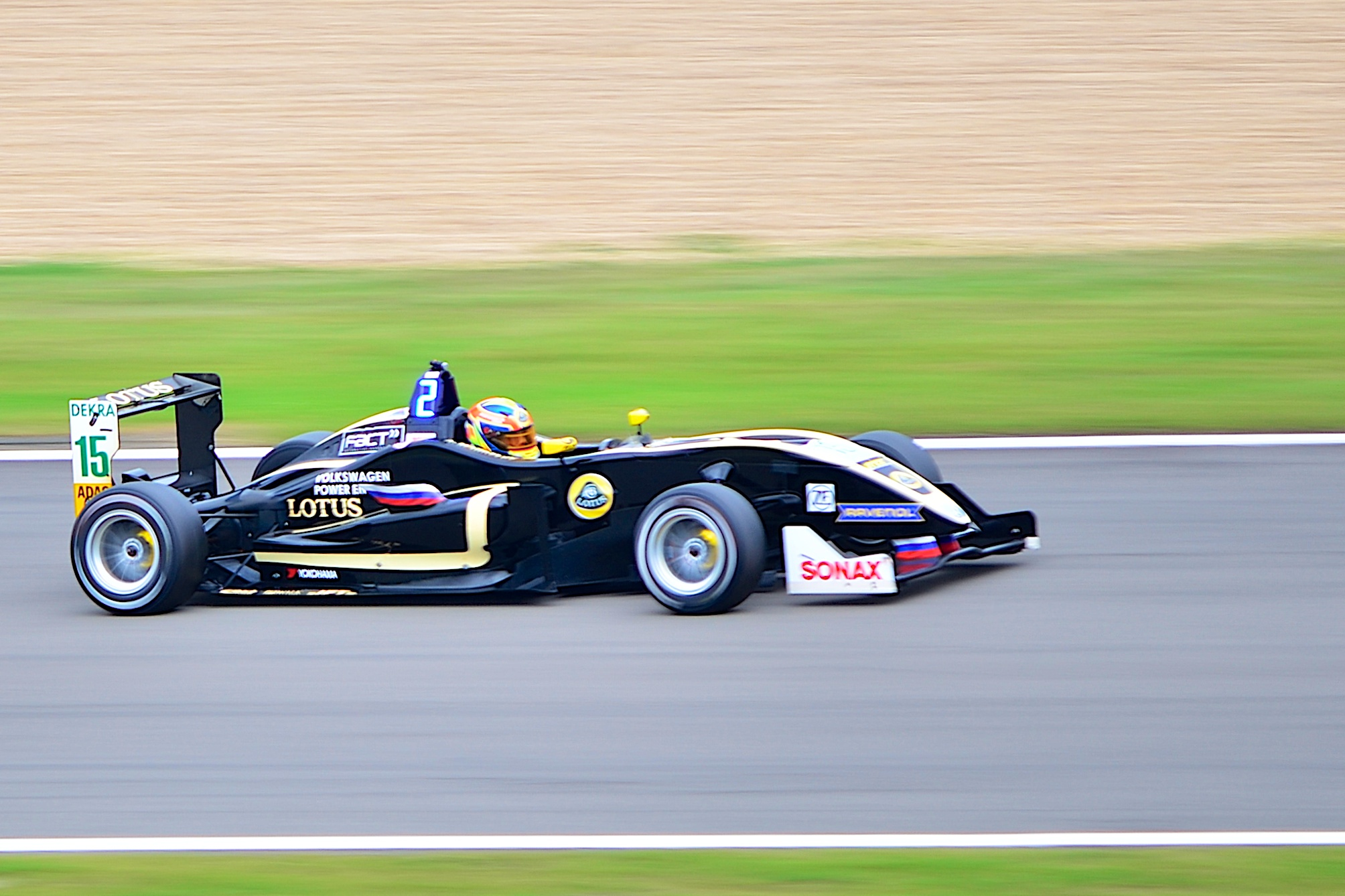
Markelov during German Formula Three Championship race at Nürburgring in 2012

Markelov and Motopark – now under the Lotus moniker – elected to compete in the German Formula Three Championship in 2012. He finished seventh in the standings, scoring three podiums, including sprint-race wins at Lausitz and Hockenheim.

==== 2013 ====
Markelov stayed in the German series for another year in 2013, remaining with Motopark. He had eighteen podiums in twenty-three races, including wins in both main races at Lausitz. He finished as runner-up to his teammate Marvin Kirchhöfer.

=== GP2 Series / FIA Formula 2 ===
==== 2014 ====
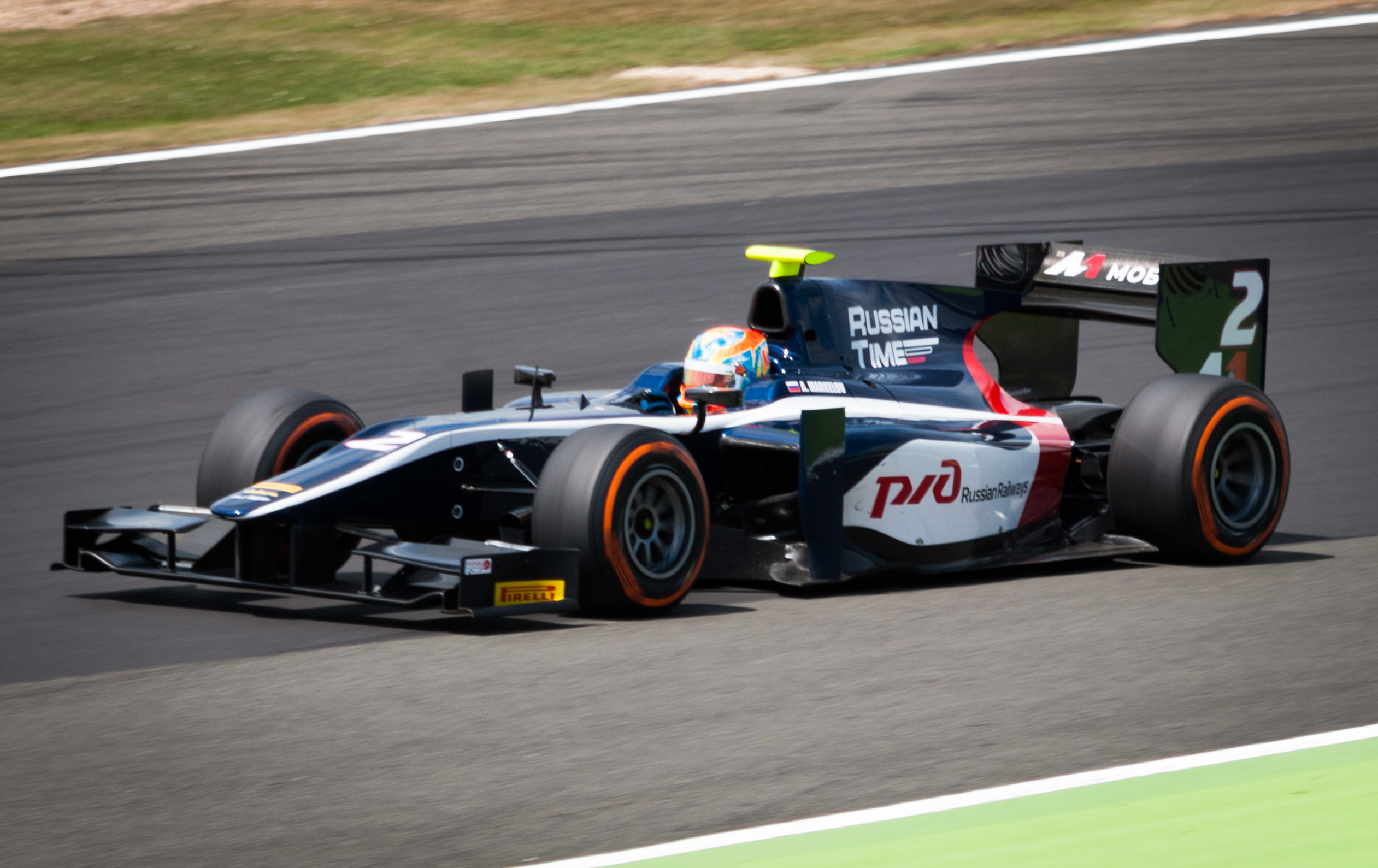
Markelov during the 2014 Silverstone GP2 Series round

Markelov made his GP2 Series debut in 2014 with Russian Time, where he joined Mitch Evans. Markelov had only one point-scoring finish at Spa-Francorchamps, finishing the season 24th, twenty positions behind Evans in the drivers' championship.

==== 2015 ====
Markelov and Evans remained with Russian Time in 2015. Markelov took his first podium at Spa-Francorchamps, when he started from the 22nd position on the grid. He made the progress in the championship to the thirteenth place, being more consistent, but he was still eight positions behind the Evans in the standings.

==== 2016 ====
Markelov continued to race with Russian Time in 2016, but this time he was joined in the team by Raffaele Marciello. Markelov claimed his first GP2 Series win in the feature race in Monaco, starting from the fifteenth starting position. However, he was not as consistent as Marciello, finishing tenth in the drivers' championship.

==== 2017 ====
For the 2017 season, the GP2 Series was rebranded as the FIA Formula 2 Championship. While Markelov remained with Russian Time for his fourth consecutive season with the Dallara GP2/11 machinery, which was also the final year of use for the chassis in the championship, being joined by Luca Ghiotto. Markelov won the first race in the FIA Formula 2 Championship history. He also collected wins at Spielberg, Spa-Francorchamps, Jerez and Abu Dhabi While it wasn't enough to prevent Charles Leclerc winning the drivers' championship, he brought the teams' championship to Russian Time with the help of Ghiotto.

==== 2018 ====
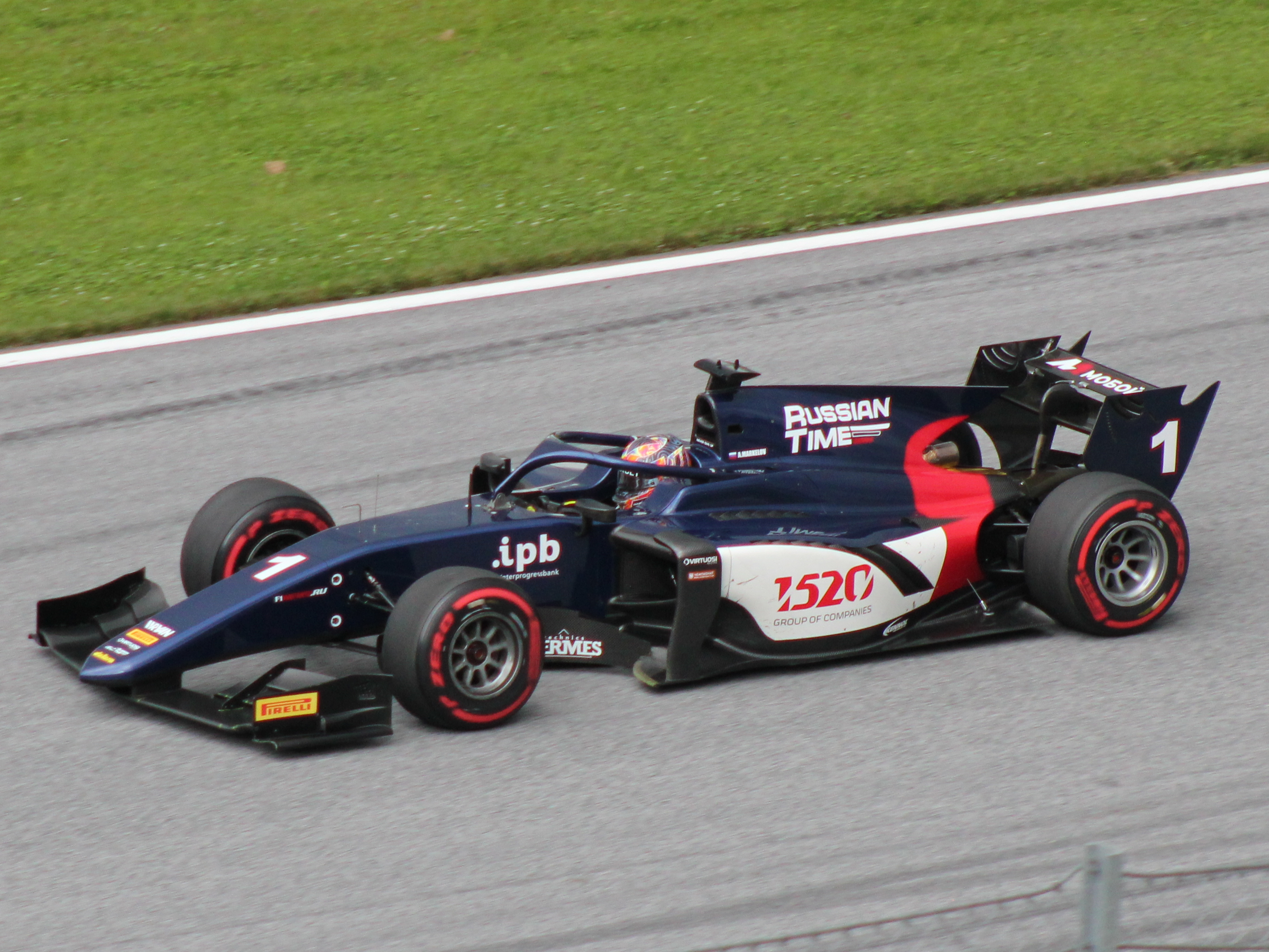
Markelov during the 2018 Spielberg Formula 2 round

Markelov remained with Russian Time in 2018. He finished the season in fifth with three wins.

==== 2019 ====
Following the 2018 season, Markelov was left without a drive in the 2019 Formula 2 season after Russian Time withdrew from the series. However, following Jordan King's participation in the 2019 Indianapolis 500, Markelov was called up by MP Motorsport for the Monaco round as a one-off replacement. He scored points in both races, with a sixth place in the first race and a fourth place in the second race.

As a result of the weekend at Spa-Francorchamps following the Lap 2 feature race crash that killed BWT Arden driver Anthoine Hubert, the team signed Markelov to finish out the season at Sochi and Abu Dhabi, although the car number changed from 19 to 22.

==== 2020 ====
In 2020, Markelov continued to race in F2 with the same team, now HWA Racelab. He was joined by Giuliano Alesi, son of former Formula One driver Jean Alesi, who left Trident at the end of the 2019 season. However, Markelov had a disappointing season, scoring only five points compared to championship winner Mick Schumacher's 215.

=== Formula One ===
In February 2018, Markelov was announced as Renault development driver for the 2018 FIA Formula One World Championship and drove in an official Formula One session for the first time at the 2018 Russian Grand Prix. He then made an appearance for the team at the 2018 Abu Dhabi Young Driver Test. It was rumoured that Markelov was a contender for a drive at Williams for 2019, but it ultimately went to Robert Kubica.

== Personal life ==
Markelov is married to former TV show host Katya Zhuzha. Their son Max was born in 2020. He is also the step father of Katya Zhuzha's child from another marriage, Nicole Markelova.

== Racing record ==
=== Karting career summary ===
Season	Series	Team	Position
2008	Rotax Max Euro Challenge — Junior		17th
2008	Chrono Dutch Rotax Max Challenge — Junior		29th
2009	Rotax Max Challenge Grand Finals — Junior	IPB Spartak Racing	21st
2009	Rotax Max Euro Challenge — Junior	IPB Spartak Racing	7th
2009	Rotax Max Wintercup — Rotax Max Junior	IPB Spartak Racing	14th

=== Racing career summary ===
Season	Series	Team	Races	Wins	Poles	F/Laps	Podiums	Points	Position
2011	ADAC Formel Masters	Motopark	23	1	0	4	11	251	4th
2011	Formula 3 Euro Series	Motopark	3	0	0	0	0	N/A	NC†
2012	German Formula 3 Championship	Lotus	27	2	0	1	3	155	7th
2013	German Formula 3 Championship	Lotus	26	2	0	2	21	339	**2nd**
2014	GP2 Series	RT Russian Time	22	0	0	0	0	6	24th
2015	GP2 Series	Russian Time	21	0	0	0	1	48	13th
2015	Toyota Racing Series	Giles Motorsport	16	0	0	0	3	525	8th
2016	GP2 Series	Russian Time	21	1	0	3	2	97	10th
2016	Toyota Racing Series	M2 Competition	15	0	0	0	5	588	8th
2017	FIA Formula 2 Championship	Russian Time	22	5	1	6	7	210	**2nd**
2018	FIA Formula 2 Championship	Russian Time	24	3	0	5	7	186	5th
2018	Formula One	Renault Sport F1 Team	Development driver						
2019	Super Formula	UOMO Sunoco Team LeMans	5	0	0	1	0	0	21st
2019	FIA Formula 2 Championship	MP Motorsport	2	0	0	0	0	16	16th
2019	FIA Formula 2 Championship	BWT Arden	4	0	0	0	0	16	16th
2020	FIA Formula 2 Championship	BWT HWA Racelab	23	0	0	0	0	5	18th

^{†} As Markelov was a guest driver, he was ineligible for points.

=== Complete ADAC Formel Masters results ===
(key) (Races in bold indicate pole position) (Races in italics indicate fastest lap)

Year	Team	1	2	3	4	5	6	7	8	9	10	11	12	13	14	15	16	17	18	19	20	21	22	23	24	DC	Points
2011	Motopark	OSC; 1 DNS	OSC; 2 Ret	OSC; 3; 14	SAC; 1; 3	SAC; 2; 3	SAC; 3; 3	ZOL; 1; 2	ZOL; 2; 2	ZOL; 3; 2	NÜR; 1; 6	NÜR; 2; 3	NÜR; 3; 4	RBR; 1; 6	RBR; 2; 8	RBR; 3; 1	LAU; 1; 11	LAU; 2; 3	LAU; 3; 2	ASS; 1 Ret	ASS; 2; 7	ASS; 3; 6	HOC; 1; 5	HOC; 2; 3	HOC; 3; 6	4th	251

=== Complete German Formula Three Championship results ===
(key) (Races in bold indicate pole position) (Races in italics indicate fastest lap)

Year	Entrant	1	2	3	4	5	6	7	8	9	10	11	12	13	14	15	16	17	18	19	20	21	22	23	24	25	26	27	DC	Points
2012	Lotus	ZAN; 1 Ret	ZAN; 2; 9	ZAN; 3 Ret	SAC; 1; 4	SAC; 2; 5	SAC; 3 DSQ	OSC; 1; 8	OSC; 2; 5	OSC; 2; 3	SPA; 1; 8	SPA; 2; 4	SPA; 3; 14†	ASS; 1; 5	ASS; 2; 7	ASS; 3; 6	RBR; 1; 8	RBR; 2; 8	RBR; 3; 10	LAU; 1; 6	LAU; 2; 1	LAU; 3; 8	NÜR; 1; 5	NÜR; 2; 5	NÜR; 3; 6	HOC; 1; 4	HOC; 2; 1	HOC; 3; 6	7th	155
2013	Lotus	OSC1; 1; 2	OSC1; 2; 2	OSC1; 2; 2	SPA; 1; 6	SPA; 2; 2	SPA; 3; 2	NÜR1; 1; 3	NÜR1; 2 C	NÜR1; 3; 2	SAC; 1; 2	SAC; 2; 3	SAC; 3; 2	LAU1; 1; 3	LAU1; 2; 4	LAU1; 3; 3	NÜR2; 1; 3	NÜR2; 2; 3	NÜR2; 3; 2	LAU2; 1; 1	LAU2; 2; 2	LAU2; 3; 1	OSC2; 1 Ret	OSC2; 2; 13	OSC2; 3; 4	HOC; 1; 3	HOC; 2; 2	HOC; 3; 3	2nd	339

=== Complete GP2 Series/FIA Formula 2 Championship results ===
(key) (Races in bold indicate pole position) (Races in italics indicate fastest lap)

Year	Entrant	1	2	3	4	5	6	7	8	9	10	11	12	13	14	15	16	17	18	19	20	21	22	23	24	DC	Points
2014	RT Russian Time	BHR; FEA; 15	BHR; SPR; 10	CAT; FEA; 11	CAT; SPR; Ret	MON; FEA; Ret	MON; SPR; Ret	RBR; FEA; 21	RBR; SPR; 16	SIL; FEA; 18	SIL; SPR; 17	HOC; FEA; Ret	HOC; SPR; 12	HUN; FEA; 16	HUN; SPR; 20†	SPA; FEA; 7	SPA; SPR; Ret	MNZ; FEA; 21	MNZ; SPR; Ret	SOC; FEA; 16	SOC; SPR; 12	YMC; FEA; Ret	YMC; SPR; 19			24th	6
2015	Russian Time	BHR; FEA; 13	BHR; SPR; 12	CAT; FEA; 12	CAT; SPR; 5	MON; FEA; Ret	MON; SPR; 14	RBR; FEA; 5	RBR; SPR; DSQ	SIL; FEA; 21	SIL; SPR; 14	HUN; FEA; 22	HUN; SPR; 18	SPA; FEA; 3	SPA; SPR; 5	MNZ; FEA; 5	MNZ; SPR; 14	SOC; FEA; Ret	SOC; SPR; 12	BHR; FEA; 16	BHR; SPR; 8	YMC; FEA; Ret	YMC; SPR; C			13th	48
2016	Russian Time	CAT; FEA; 4	CAT; SPR; 4	MON; FEA; 1	MON; SPR; 8	BAK; FEA; Ret	BAK; SPR; 5	RBR; FEA; Ret	RBR; SPR; 11	SIL; FEA; 10	SIL; SPR; 12	HUN; FEA; 9	HUN; SPR; 4	HOC; FEA; Ret	HOC; SPR; 9	SPA; FEA; 5	SPA; SPR; 21†	MNZ; FEA; 10	MNZ; SPR; 10	SEP; FEA; DNS	SEP; SPR; 13	YMC; FEA; 3	YMC; SPR; 7			10th	97
2017	Russian Time	BHR; FEA; 1	BHR; SPR; 8	CAT; FEA; 8	CAT; SPR; 9	MON; FEA; 2	MON; SPR; 5	BAK; FEA; 4	BAK; SPR; 5	RBR; FEA; 8	RBR; SPR; 1	SIL; FEA; 4	SIL; SPR; 3	HUN; FEA; 17†	HUN; SPR; 9	SPA; FEA; 1	SPA; SPR; Ret	MNZ; FEA; 9	MNZ; SPR; 15	JER; FEA; 5	JER; SPR; 1	**YMC**; **FEA**; 1	YMC; SPR; 6			2nd	210
2018	Russian Time	BHR; FEA; 3	BHR; SPR; 1	BAK; FEA; Ret	BAK; SPR; Ret	CAT; FEA; 8	CAT; SPR; 9	MON; FEA; 1	MON; SPR; 4	LEC; FEA; 14	LEC; SPR; 14†	RBR; FEA; 8	RBR; SPR; 1	SIL; FEA; 6	SIL; SPR; 4	HUN; FEA; 8	HUN; SPR; 13	SPA; FEA; 6	SPA; SPR; 5	MNZ; FEA; 2	MNZ; SPR; 2	SOC; FEA; 11	SOC; SPR; 5	YMC; FEA; 2	YMC; SPR; 7	5th	186
2019	MP Motorsport	BHR; FEA	BHR; SPR	BAK; FEA	BAK; SPR	CAT; FEA	CAT; SPR	MON; FEA; 6	MON; SPR; 4	LEC; FEA	LEC; SPR	RBR; FEA	RBR; SPR	SIL; FEA	SIL; SPR	HUN; FEA	HUN; SPR	SPA; FEA	SPA; SPR	MNZ; FEA	MNZ; SPR					16th	16
2019	BWT Arden																					SOC; FEA; Ret	SOC; SPR; 10	YMC; FEA; Ret	YMC; SPR; Ret	16th	16
2020	BWT HWA Racelab	RBR1; FEA; Ret	RBR1; SPR; 18	RBR2; FEA; DNS	RBR2; SPR; 16	HUN; FEA; Ret	HUN; SPR; 14	SIL1; FEA; 18	SIL1; SPR; 11	SIL2; FEA; 19	SIL2; SPR; 11	CAT; FEA; 12	CAT; SPR; 16	SPA; FEA; 16	SPA; SPR; 8	MNZ; FEA; 17	MNZ; SPR; 16	MUG; FEA; 8	MUG; SPR; 20	SOC; FEA; 15	SOC; SPR; 12	BHR1; FEA; 22	BHR1; SPR; 10	BHR2; FEA; 13	BHR2; SPR; 20	18th	5

^{†} Driver did not finish the race, but was classified as he completed over 90% of the race distance.

=== Complete Toyota Racing Series results ===
(key) (Races in bold indicate pole position) (Races in italics indicate fastest lap)

Year	Team	1	2	3	4	5	6	7	8	9	10	11	12	13	14	15	16	DC	Points
2015	Giles Motorsport	RUA; 1 Ret	RUA; 2 Ret	RUA; 3; 3	TER; 1; 5	TER; 2; 2	TER; 3; 7	HMP; 1; 7	HMP; 2 Ret	HMP; 3; 6	TAU; 1; 14	TAU; 2 Ret	TAU; 3 Ret	TAU; 4; 2	MAN; 1; 7	MAN; 2; 7	MAN; 3; 6	8th	525
2016	M2 Competition	RUA; 1; 2	RUA; 2; 4	RUA; 3; 3	TER; 1; 6	TER; 2; 3	TER; 3; 3	HMP; 1; 12	HMP; 2 Ret	HMP; 3; 5	TAU; 1; 12	TAU; 2; 7	TAU; 3 Ret	MAN; 1 Ret	MAN; 2; 12	MAN; 3; 2		8th	588

=== Complete Formula One participations ===
(key) (Races in bold indicate pole position; races in italics indicate fastest lap)

Year	Entrant	Chassis	Engine	1	2	3	4	5	6	7	8	9	10	11	12	13	14	15	16	17	18	19	20	21	WDC	Points
2018	Renault Sport F1 Team	Renault R.S.18	Renault R.E.18 1.6 V6 t	AUS	BHR	CHN	AZE	ESP	MON	CAN	FRA	AUT	GBR	GER	HUN	BEL	ITA	SIN	RUS; TD	JPN	USA	MEX	BRA	ABU	–	–

=== Complete Super Formula results ===
(key) (Races in bold indicate pole position) (Races in italics indicate fastest lap)

Year	Team	Engine	1	2	3	4	5	6	7	DC	Points
2019	UOMO Sunoco Team LeMans	Toyota	SUZ; 10	AUT; Ret	SUG; 16	FUJ; 19	MOT; 12	OKA	SUZ	21st	0
