= 2017 Spa-Francorchamps Formula 2 round =

(Belgium) 2017 Spa-Francorchamps Formula 2 round
Round details
- Round 8 of 11 in the 2017 FIA Formula 2 Championship.
- Layout of the Circuit de Spa-Francorchamps
- Location: Circuit de Spa-Francorchamps, Stavelot, Belgium
- Course: Permanent racing facility 7.004 km (4.352 mi)

Feature race
- Date: 26 August 2017
- Laps: 25
Pole position
Driver	(Monaco) Charles Leclerc	Prema Racing
Time	2:20.842	
Podium
First	(Russia) Artem Markelov	Russian Time
Second	(Italy) Luca Ghiotto	Russian Time
Third	(Italy) Antonio Fuoco	Prema Racing
Fastest lap
Driver	(Russia) Artem Markelov	Russian Time
- Time: 2:00.204 (on lap 18)

Sprint race
- Date: 27 August 2017
- Laps: 18
Podium
First	(Brazil) Sérgio Sette Câmara	MP Motorsport
Second	(Netherlands) Nyck de Vries	Racing Engineering
Third	(Italy) Luca Ghiotto	Russian Time
Fastest lap
Driver	(Netherlands) Nyck de Vries	Racing Engineering
- Time: 2:01.367 (on lap 2)

The 2017 Spa-Francorchamps FIA Formula 2 round was a pair of motor races held on 26 and 27 August 2017 at the Circuit de Spa-Francorchamps in Stavelot, Belgium as part of the FIA Formula 2 Championship. It was the eighth round of the 2017 FIA Formula 2 Championship and was run in support of the 2017 Belgian Grand Prix.

== Background ==
Charles Leclerc, once again, entered the round as the championship leader with a significant margin over nearest rival, Oliver Rowland. Rowland had closed the gap in the previous round in Hungary, but nevertheless was still 54 points behind the Monégasque driver.

For this round, Rapax had inherited an entirely new driver lineup with Sergio Canamasas and Nyck de Vries making way for Louis Delétraz and Roberto Merhi. Nyck de Vries and Louis Delétraz effectively switched seats with de Vries going from Rapax to Racing Engineering and Delétraz vice versa.

== Classifications ==
=== Qualifying ===
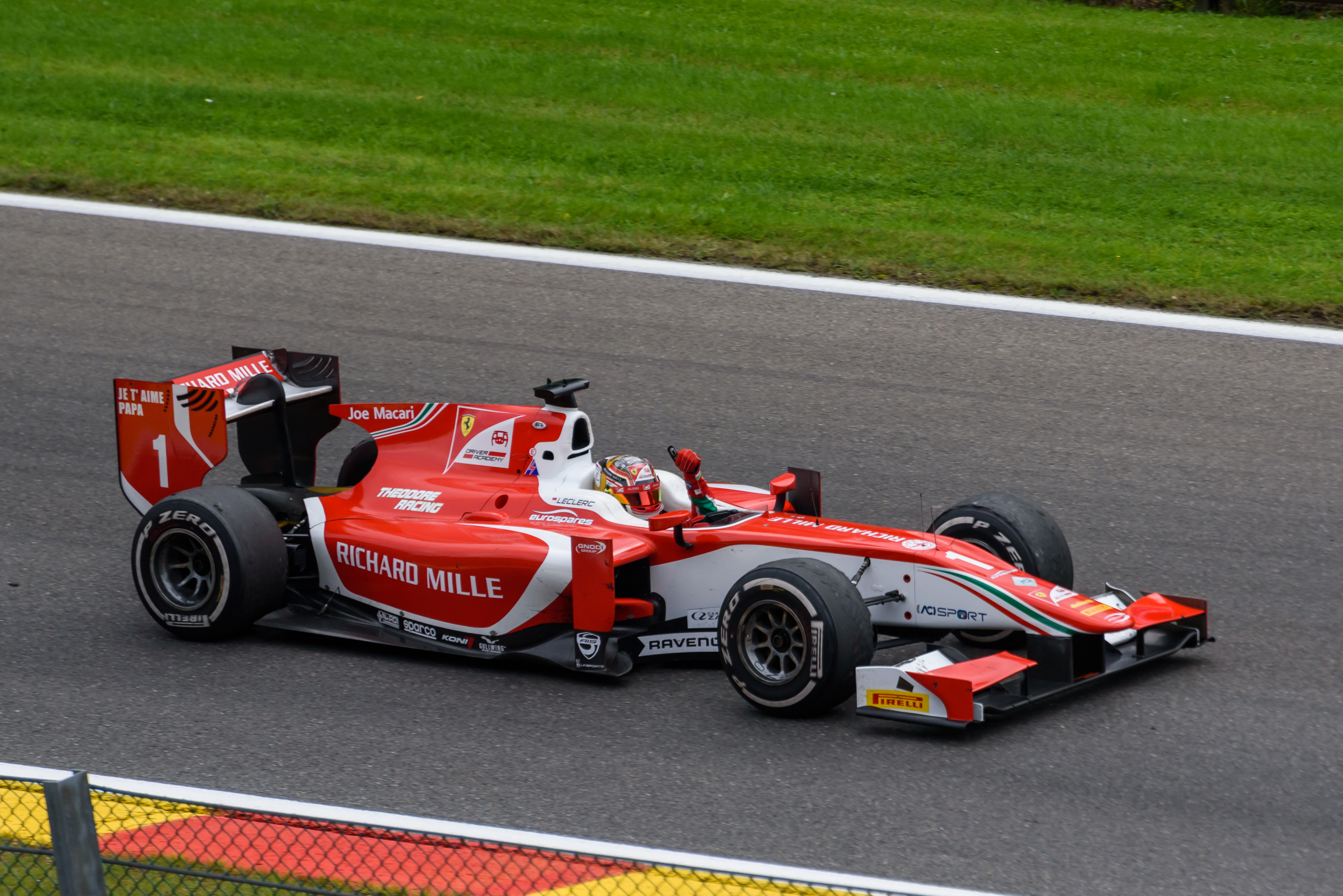
Charles Leclerc

Pos.	No.	Driver	Team	Time	Gap	Grid
1	1	(Monaco) Charles Leclerc	Prema Racing	2:20.842	—	1
2	10	(Canada) Nicholas Latifi	DAMS	2:21.510	+0.668	2
3	9	(United Kingdom) Oliver Rowland	DAMS	2:21.578	+0.736	3
4	4	(Sweden) Gustav Malja	Racing Engineering	2:22.069	+1.227	4
5	2	(Italy) Antonio Fuoco	Prema Racing	2:22.073	+1.231	5
6	3	(Netherlands) Nyck de Vries	Racing Engineering	2:22.534	+1.692	6
7	5	(Italy) Luca Ghiotto	Russian Time	2:22.952	+2.110	7
8	19	(Spain) Roberto Merhi	Rapax	2:23.132	+2.290	8
9	6	(Russia) Artem Markelov	Russian Time	2:23.180	+2.338	9
10	8	(Thailand) Alexander Albon	ART Grand Prix	2:23.409	+2.567	10
11	14	(Brazil) Sérgio Sette Câmara	MP Motorsport	2:23.424	+2.582	11
12	17	(United States) Santino Ferrucci	Trident	2:23.459	+2.617	12
13	18	(Switzerland) Louis Delétraz	Rapax	2:23.470	+2.628	13
14	11	(Switzerland) Ralph Boschung	Campos Racing	2:23.737	+2.895	14
15	7	(Japan) Nobuharu Matsushita	ART Grand Prix	2:23.788	+2.946	15
16	15	(United Kingdom) Jordan King	MP Motorsport	2:24.127	+3.285	16
17	12	(Romania) Robert Visoiu	Campos Racing	2:24.215	+3.373	17
18	20	(France) Norman Nato	Arden International	2:24.437	+3.595	18
19	21	(Indonesia) Sean Gelael	Arden International	2:25.039	+4.197	19
20	16	(Malaysia) Nabil Jeffri	Trident	2:27.008	+6.166	20

=== Feature Race ===
Pos.	No.	Driver	Team	Laps	Time/Retired	Grid	Points
1	6	(Russia) Artem Markelov	Russian Time	25	52:50.172	9	25 (2)
2	5	(Italy) Luca Ghiotto	Russian Time	25	+6.057	7	18
3	2	(Italy) Antonio Fuoco	Prema Racing	25	+6.446	5	15
4	4	(Sweden) Gustav Malja	Racing Engineering	25	+19.912	4	12
5	3	(Netherlands) Nyck de Vries	Racing Engineering	25	+21.149	6	10
6	14	(Brazil) Sérgio Sette Câmara	MP Motorsport	25	+29.356	11	8
7	19	(Spain) Roberto Merhi	Rapax	25	+33.479	8	6
8	20	(France) Norman Nato	Arden International	25	+35.611	18	4
9	17	(United States) Santino Ferrucci	Trident	25	+42.735	12	2
10	12	(Romania) Robert Vișoiu	Campos Racing	25	+44.133	17	1
11	16	(Malaysia) Nabil Jeffri	Trident	25	+47.608	20	
12	8	(Thailand) Alexander Albon	ART Grand Prix	25	+59.552	10	
13	11	(Switzerland) Ralph Boschung	Campos Racing	25	+1:00.217	14	
14	18	(Switzerland) Louis Delétraz	Rapax	25	+1:01.070	13	
15	21	(Indonesia) Sean Gelael	Arden International	25	+1:14.082	19	
16	7	(Japan) Nobuharu Matsushita	ART Grand Prix	24	+1 lap	15	
DNF	15	(United Kingdom) Jordan King	MP Motorsport	1	Puncture	16	
DNS	10	(Canada) Nicholas Latifi	DAMS	0	Fuel pressure	2	
DSQ	1	(Monaco) Charles Leclerc	Prema Racing	25	Disqualified	1	(4)
DSQ	9	(United Kingdom) Oliver Rowland	DAMS	25	Disqualified	3	
Fastest lap: (Russia) Artem Markelov (Russian Time) – 2:00.204 (on lap 18)

=== Sprint Race ===
Pos.	No.	Driver	Team	Laps	Time/Retired	Grid	Points
1	14	(Brazil) Sérgio Sette Câmara	MP Motorsport	18	39:40.215	1	15
2	3	(Netherlands) Nyck de Vries	Racing Engineering	18	+0.623	2	12 (2)
3	5	(Italy) Luca Ghiotto	Russian Time	18	+2.403	5	10
4	20	(France) Norman Nato	Arden International	18	+3.109	10	8
5	1	(Monaco) Charles Leclerc	Prema Racing	18	+3.820	8	6
6	19	(Spain) Roberto Merhi	Rapax	18	+4.894	9	4
7	2	(Italy) Antonio Fuoco	Prema Racing	18	+5.448	4	2
8	9	(United Kingdom) Oliver Rowland	DAMS	18	+5.828	6	1
9	10	(Canada) Nicholas Latifi	DAMS	18	+6.690	20	
10	17	(United States) Santino Ferrucci	Trident	18	+9.202	11	
11	4	(Sweden) Gustav Malja	Racing Engineering	18	+9.629	3	
12	18	(Switzerland) Louis Delétraz	Rapax	18	+10.556	16	
13	11	(Switzerland) Ralph Boschung	Campos Racing	18	+10.865	15	
14	15	(United Kingdom) Jordan King	MP Motorsport	18	+11.095	19	
15	16	(Malaysia) Nabil Jeffri	Trident	18	+12.070	13	
16	12	(Romania) Robert Vișoiu	Campos Racing	18	+13.709	12	
17	21	(Indonesia) Sean Gelael	Arden International	18	+14.121	17	
18	8	(Thailand) Alexander Albon	ART Grand Prix	18	+17.543	14	
DNF	7	(Japan) Nobuharu Matsushita	ART Grand Prix	14	Accident	18	
DNF	6	(Russia) Artem Markelov	Russian Time	12	Engine	7	
Fastest lap: (Netherlands) Nyck de Vries (Racing Engineering) – 2:01.367 (on lap 2)

== Championship standings after the round ==
Drivers' Championship standings

	Pos.	Driver	Points
	1	(Monaco) Charles Leclerc	218
	2	(United Kingdom) Oliver Rowland	159
	3	(Russia) Artem Markelov	150
1	4	(Italy) Luca Ghiotto	123
1	5	(Canada) Nicholas Latifi	115

Teams' Championship standings

	Pos.	Team	Points
	1	(France) DAMS	274
1	2	(Russia) Russian Time	273
1	3	(Italy) Prema Racing	258
	4	(France) ART Grand Prix	165
	5	(Italy) Rapax	116

- Note: Only the top five positions are included for both sets of standings.

== See also ==
- 2017 Belgian Grand Prix
- 2017 Spa-Francorchamps GP3 Series round

Previous round: 2017 Budapest Formula 2 round	FIA Formula 2 Championship; 2017 season	Next round: 2017 Monza Formula 2 round
Previous round: 2016 Spa-Francorchamps GP2 Series round	Spa-Francorchamps Formula 2 round	Next round: 2018 Spa-Francorchamps Formula 2 round
