= 2017 Budapest Formula 2 round =

(Hungary) 2017 Hungaroring Formula 2 round
Round details
- Round 7 of 11 in the 2017 FIA Formula 2 Championship.
- Layout of the Hungaroring
- Location: Hungaroring, Mogyoród, Hungary
- Course: Permanent racing facility 4.381 km (2.722 mi)

Feature race
- Date: 29 July 2017
- Laps: 36
Pole position
Driver	(United Kingdom) Oliver Rowland	DAMS
Time	1:26.731	
Podium
First	(United Kingdom) Oliver Rowland	DAMS
Second	(Canada) Nicholas Latifi	DAMS
Third	(Netherlands) Nyck de Vries	Rapax
Fastest lap
Driver	(Canada) Nicholas Latifi	DAMS
- Time: 1:30.153 (on lap 18)

Sprint race
- Date: 30 July 2017
- Laps: 28
Podium
First	(Japan) Nobuharu Matsushita	ART Grand Prix
Second	(United Kingdom) Oliver Rowland	DAMS
Third	(Netherlands) Nyck de Vries	Rapax
Fastest lap
Driver	(Russia) Artem Markelov	Russian Time
- Time: 1:29.257 (on lap 27)

The 2017 Hungaroring FIA Formula 2 round was a pair of motor races held on 29 and 30 July 2017 at the Hungaroring in Mogyoród, Hungary as part of the FIA Formula 2 Championship. It was the seventh round of the 2017 FIA Formula 2 Championship and was run in support of the 2017 Hungarian Grand Prix.

The championship leader Charles Leclerc was due to make history in Formula 2 with his seventh consecutive pole - the first driver in the series history ever to set the benchmark. He later got disqualified due to a technical breach and was forced to start from the back of the grid. Thus, Oliver Rowland inherited pole position, which became his first and only pole position of the season.

== Classifications ==
=== Qualifying ===
Pos.	No.	Driver	Team	Time	Gap	Grid
1	9	(United Kingdom) Oliver Rowland	DAMS	1:26.731	—	1
2	6	(Russia) Artem Markelov	Russian Time	1:26.806	+0.075	2
3	15	(United Kingdom) Jordan King	MP Motorsport	1:26.849	+0.118	3
4	2	(Italy) Antonio Fuoco	Prema Racing	1:26.885	+0.154	4
5	20	(France) Norman Nato	Arden International	1:26.968	+0.237	5
6	10	(Canada) Nicholas Latifi	DAMS	1:26.973	+0.242	6
7	18	(Netherlands) Nyck de Vries	Rapax	1:27.026	+0.295	7
8	7	(Japan) Nobuharu Matsushita	ART Grand Prix	1:27.103	+0.372	8
9	19	(Spain) Sergio Canamasas	Rapax	1:27.129	+0.398	9
10	17	(United States) Santino Ferrucci	Trident	1:27.139	+0.408	10
11	8	(Thailand) Alexander Albon	ART Grand Prix	1:27.221	+0.490	11
12	5	(Italy) Luca Ghiotto	Russian Time	1:27.238	+0.507	12
13	12	(Romania) Robert Vișoiu	Campos Racing	1:27.301	+0.570	13
14	11	(Switzerland) Ralph Boschung	Campos Racing	1:27.339	+0.608	14
15	14	(Brazil) Sérgio Sette Câmara	MP Motorsport	1:27.492	+0.761	18
16	3	(Switzerland) Louis Delétraz	Racing Engineering	1:27.582	+0.851	15
17	4	(Sweden) Gustav Malja	Racing Engineering	1:27.804	+1.073	16
18	16	(Malaysia) Nabil Jeffri	Trident	1:28.248	+1.517	17
19	21	(Indonesia) Sean Gelael	Arden International	1:46.783	+20.052	19
EX	1	(Monaco) Charles Leclerc	Prema Racing	1:26.268	—	20

=== Feature Race ===
Pos.	No.	Driver	Team	Laps	Time/Retired	Grid	Points
1	9	(United Kingdom) Oliver Rowland	DAMS	36	58:37.062	1	25 (4)
2	10	(Canada) Nicholas Latifi	DAMS	36	+0.235	6	18 (2)
3	18	(Netherlands) Nyck de Vries	Rapax	36	+0.673	7	15
4	1	(Monaco) Charles Leclerc	Prema Racing	36	+1.405	20	12
5	7	(Japan) Nobuharu Matsushita	ART Grand Prix	36	+1.633	8	10
6	5	(Italy) Luca Ghiotto	Russian Time	36	+2.534	12	8
7	20	(France) Norman Nato	Arden International	36	+3.079	5	6
8	8	(Thailand) Alexander Albon	ART Grand Prix	36	+3.350	11	4
9	17	(United States) Santino Ferrucci	Trident	36	+4.238	10	2
10	3	(Switzerland) Louis Delétraz	Racing Engineering	36	+6.627	15	1
11	11	(Switzerland) Ralph Boschung	Campos Racing	36	+7.550	14	
12	16	(Malaysia) Nabil Jeffri	Trident	36	+8.179	17	
13	4	(Sweden) Gustav Malja	Racing Engineering	36	+9.462	16	
14	21	(Indonesia) Sean Gelael	Arden International	36	+13.911	19	
15	15	(United Kingdom) Jordan King	MP Motorsport	36	+16.126	3	
16	14	(Brazil) Sérgio Sette Câmara	MP Motorsport	36	+19.069	18	
DNF	6	(Russia) Artem Markelov	Russian Time	33	Accident	2	
DNF	19	(Spain) Sergio Canamasas	Rapax	24	Collision	9	
DNF	12	(Romania) Robert Vișoiu	Campos Racing	24	Collision	13	
DNF	2	(Italy) Antonio Fuoco	Prema Racing	11	Suspension	4	
Fastest lap: (Canada) Nicholas Latifi (DAMS) – 1:30.153 (on lap 18)

=== Sprint Race ===
Pos.	No.	Driver	Team	Laps	Time/Retired	Grid	Points
1	7	(Japan) Nobuharu Matsushita	ART Grand Prix	28	44:52.900	4	15
2	9	(United Kingdom) Oliver Rowland	DAMS	28	+4.307	8	12
3	18	(Netherlands) Nyck de Vries	Rapax	28	+7.143	6	10
4	1	(Monaco) Charles Leclerc	Prema Racing	28	+11.635	5	8
5	20	(France) Norman Nato	Arden International	28	+12.458	2	6
6	10	(Canada) Nicholas Latifi	DAMS	28	+13.485	7	4
7	8	(Thailand) Alexander Albon	ART Grand Prix	28	+16.754	1	2
8	5	(Italy) Luca Ghiotto	Russian Time	28	+24.843	3	1
9	6	(Russia) Artem Markelov	Russian Time	28	+25.577	17	(2)
10	21	(Indonesia) Sean Gelael	Arden International	28	+33.887	14	
11	15	(United Kingdom) Jordan King	MP Motorsport	28	+35.770	15	
12	3	(Switzerland) Louis Delétraz	Racing Engineering	28	+35.823	10	
13	14	(Brazil) Sérgio Sette Câmara	MP Motorsport	28	+41.847	16	
14	17	(United States) Santino Ferrucci	Trident	28	+42.122	9	
15	16	(Malaysia) Nabil Jeffri	Trident	28	+1:26.947	12	
16	11	(Switzerland) Ralph Boschung	Campos Racing	27	+1 lap	11	
17	2	(Italy) Antonio Fuoco	Prema Racing	27	Engine	20	
DNF	4	(Sweden) Gustav Malja	Racing Engineering	23	Engine	13	
DNF	19	(Spain) Sergio Canamasas	Rapax	21	Accident	18	
DNF	12	(Romania) Robert Vișoiu	Campos Racing	20	Accident	19	
Fastest lap: (Russia) Artem Markelov (Russian Time) – 1:29.257 (on lap 27)

== Championship standings after the round ==
Drivers' Championship standings

	Pos.	Driver	Points
	1	(Monaco) Charles Leclerc	208
1	2	(United Kingdom) Oliver Rowland	158
1	3	(Russia) Artem Markelov	123
	4	(Canada) Nicholas Latifi	115
	5	(Italy) Luca Ghiotto	95

Teams' Championship standings

	Pos.	Team	Points
1	1	(France) DAMS	273
1	2	(Italy) Prema Racing	231
	3	(Russia) Russian Time	218
	4	(France) ART Grand Prix	165
	5	(Italy) Rapax	106

- Note: Only the top five positions are included for both sets of standings.

== See also ==
- 2017 Hungarian Grand Prix
- 2017 Budapest GP3 Series round

Previous round: 2017 Silverstone Formula 2 round	FIA Formula 2 Championship; 2017 season	Next round: 2017 Spa-Francorchamps Formula 2 round
Previous round: 2016 Hungaroring GP2 Series round	Budapest Formula 2 round	Next round: 2018 Budapest Formula 2 round
