= 2018 Spielberg Formula 2 round =

(Austria) 2018 Red Bull Ring Formula 2 round
Round details
- Round 6 of 12 in the 2018 FIA Formula 2 Championship.
- Layout of the Red Bull Ring
- Location: Red Bull Ring; Spielberg, Styria, Austria
- Course: Permanent racing circuit 4.318 km (2.683 mi)

Feature race
- Date: 30 June 2018
- Laps: 40
Pole position
Driver	(United Kingdom) George Russell	ART Grand Prix
Time	1:13.541	
Podium
First	(United Kingdom) George Russell	ART Grand Prix
Second	(United Kingdom) Lando Norris	Carlin
Third	(Italy) Antonio Fuoco	Charouz Racing System
Fastest lap
Driver	(Russia) Artem Markelov	Russian Time
- Time: 1:17.062 (on lap 38)

Sprint race
- Date: 1 July 2018
- Laps: 28
Podium
First	(Russia) Artem Markelov	Russian Time
Second	(United Kingdom) George Russell	ART Grand Prix
Third	(Brazil) Sérgio Sette Câmara	Carlin
Fastest lap
Driver	(Russia) Artem Markelov	Russian Time
- Time: 1:17.365 (on lap 6)

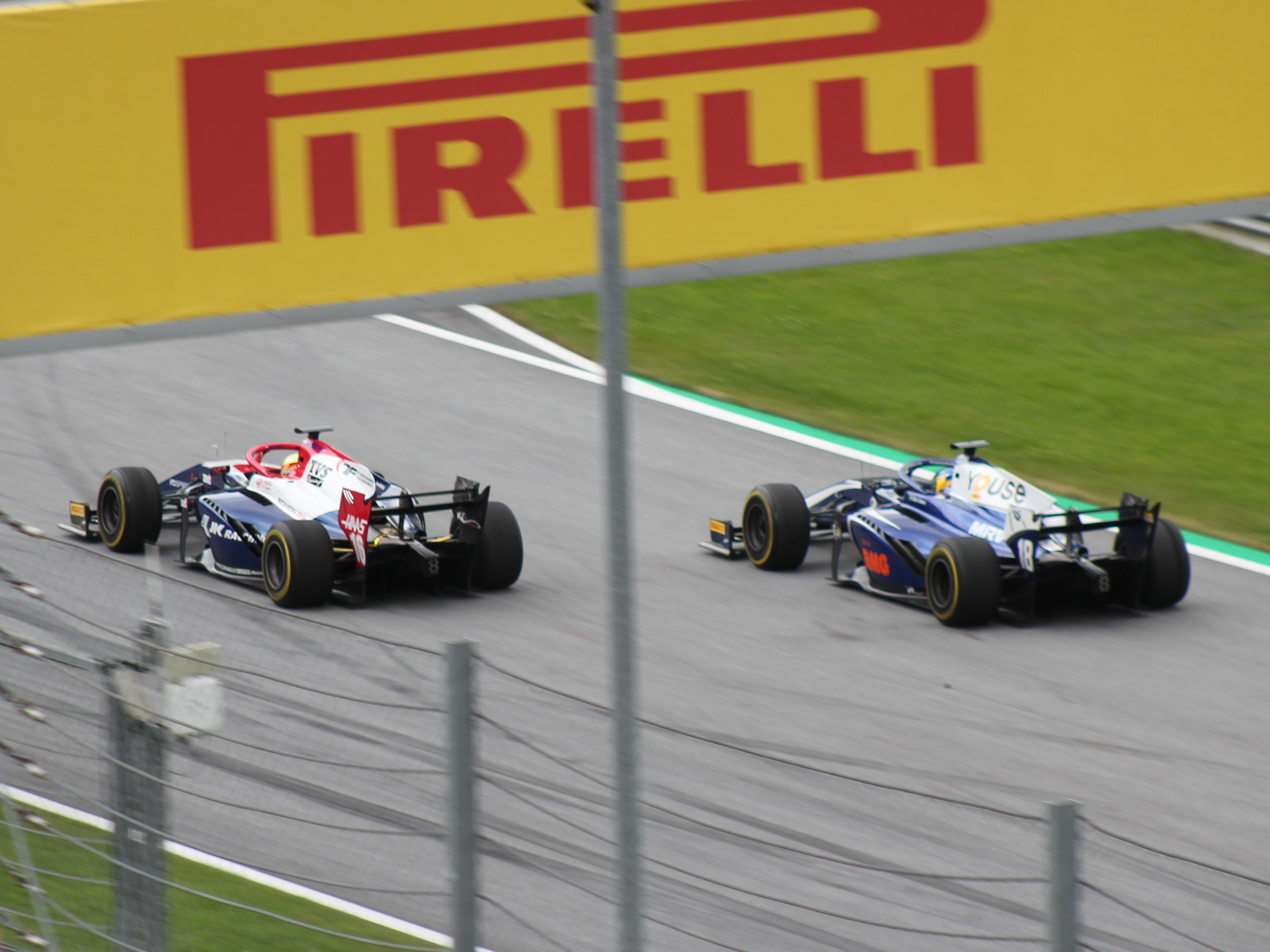
Arjun Maini and Sérgio Sette Câmara battle in practice

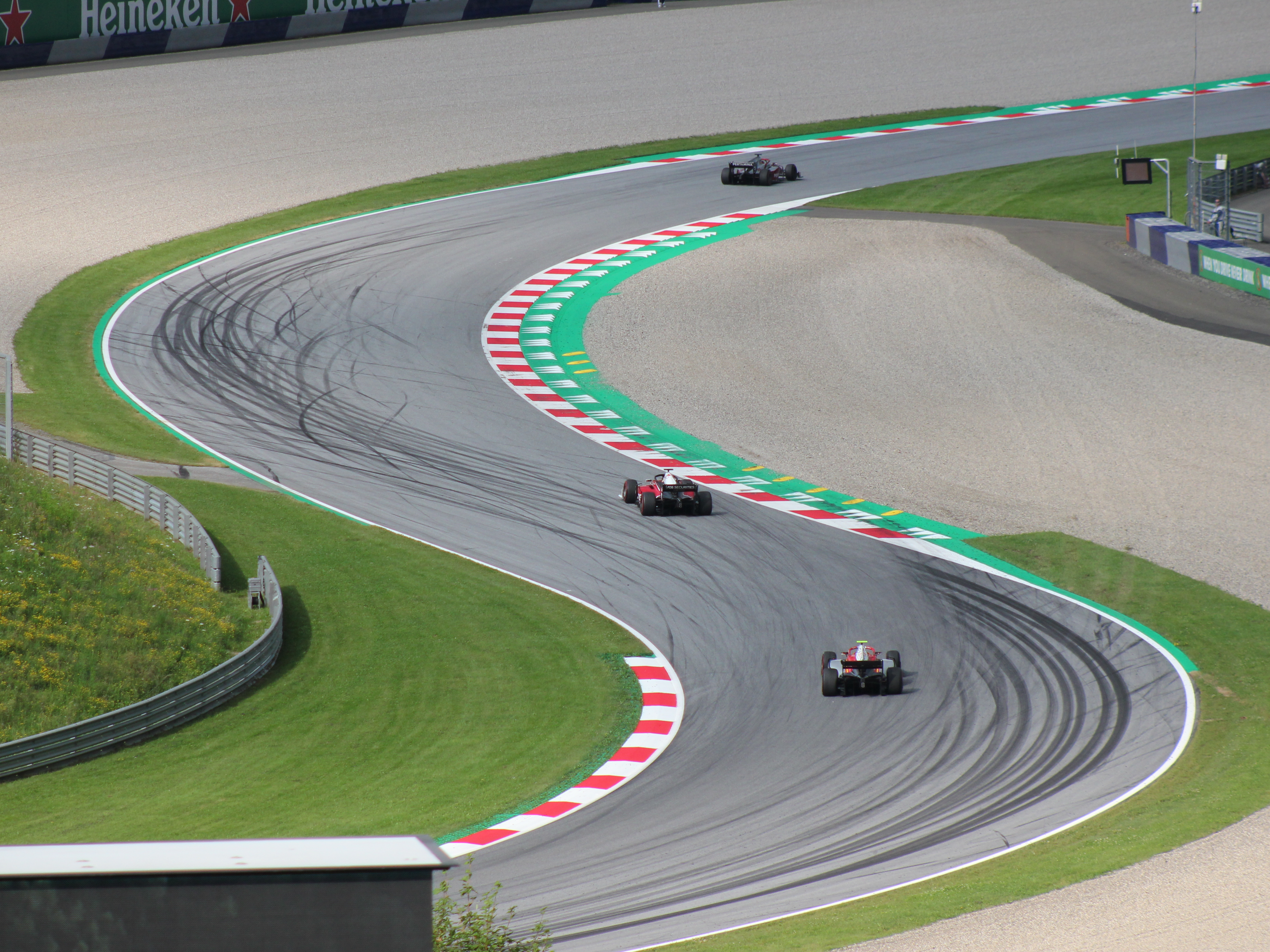
Qualifying action

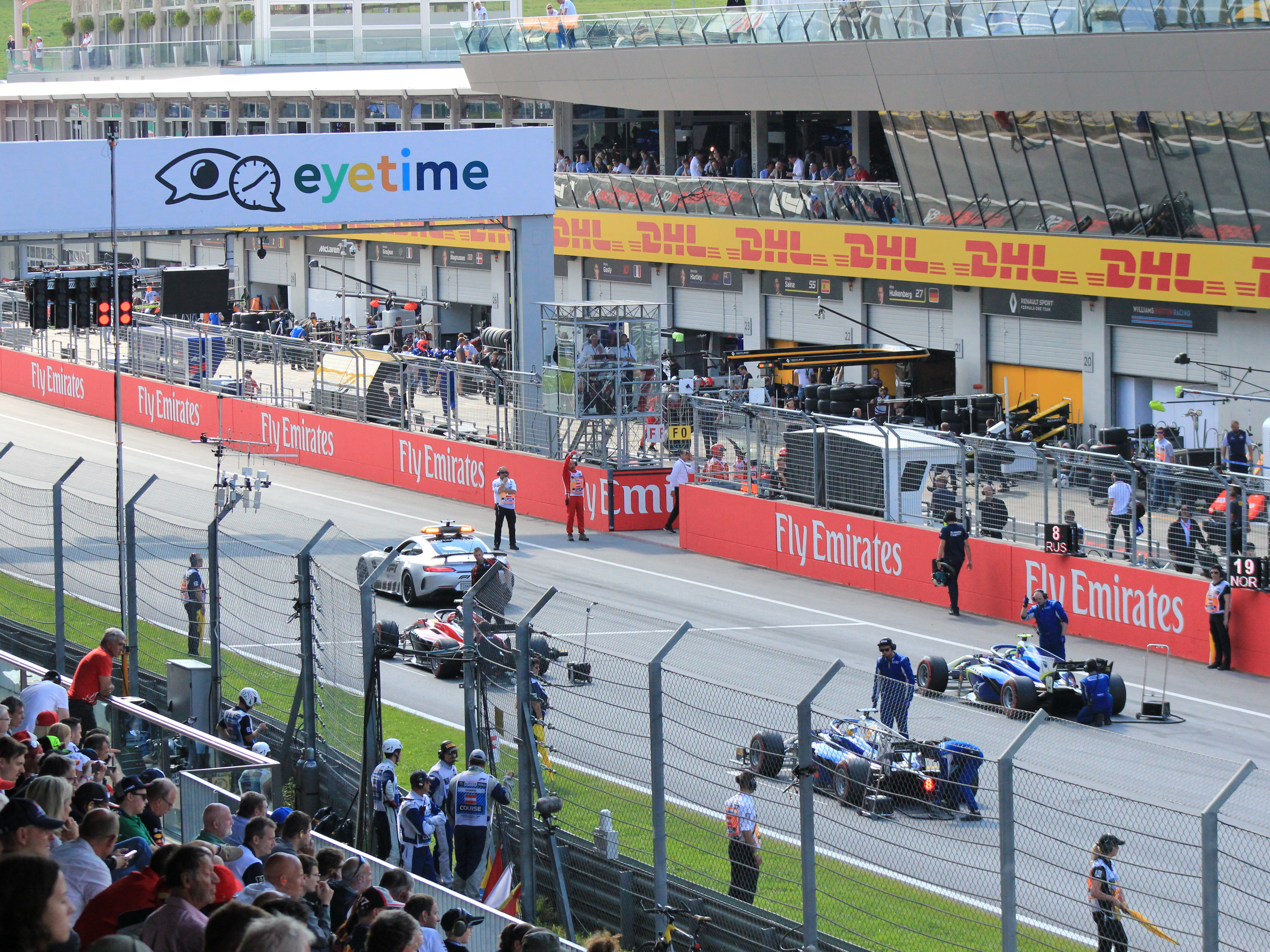
The starting grid moments before the formation lap

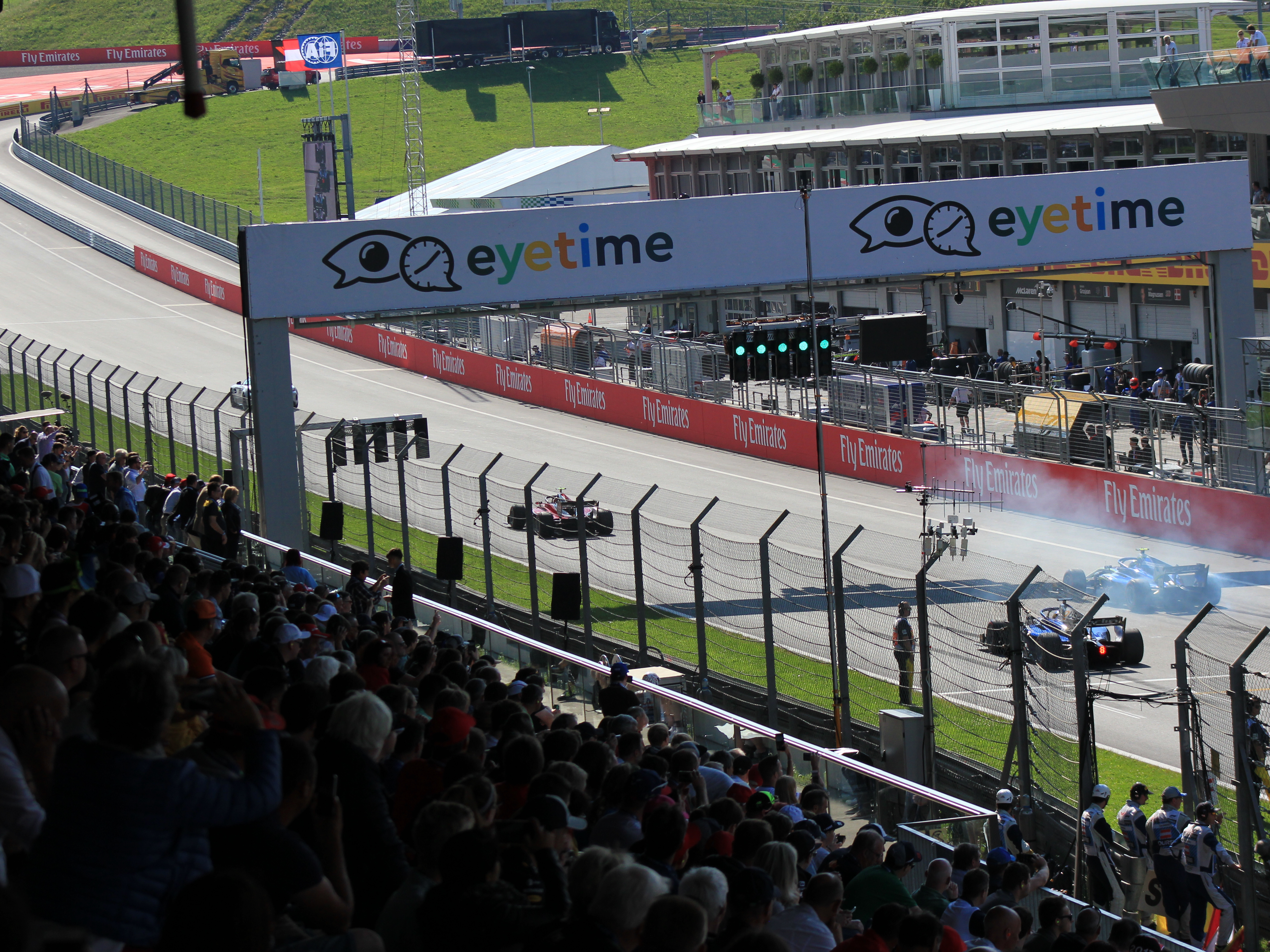
Start of the formation lap

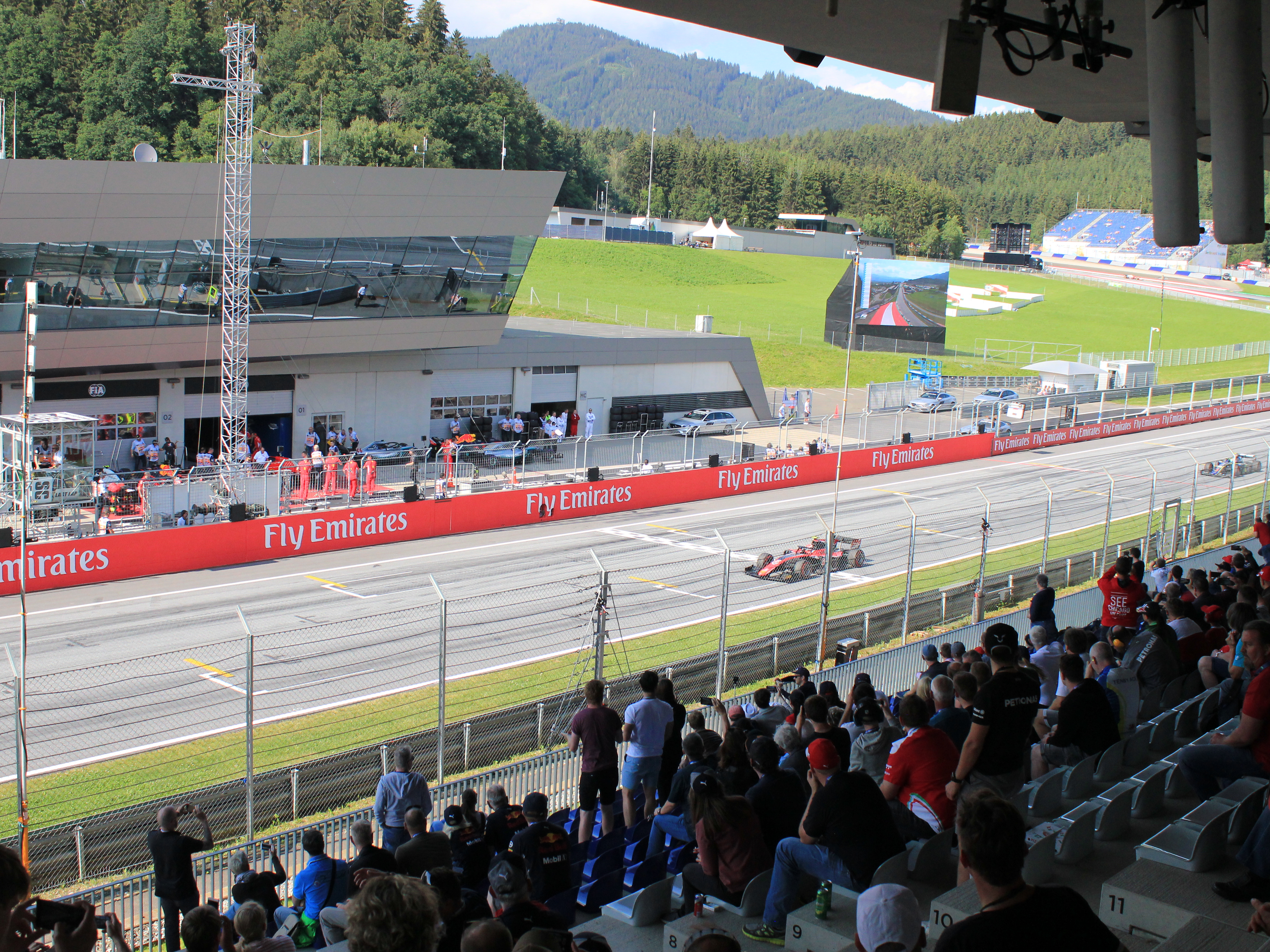
Start of the feature race

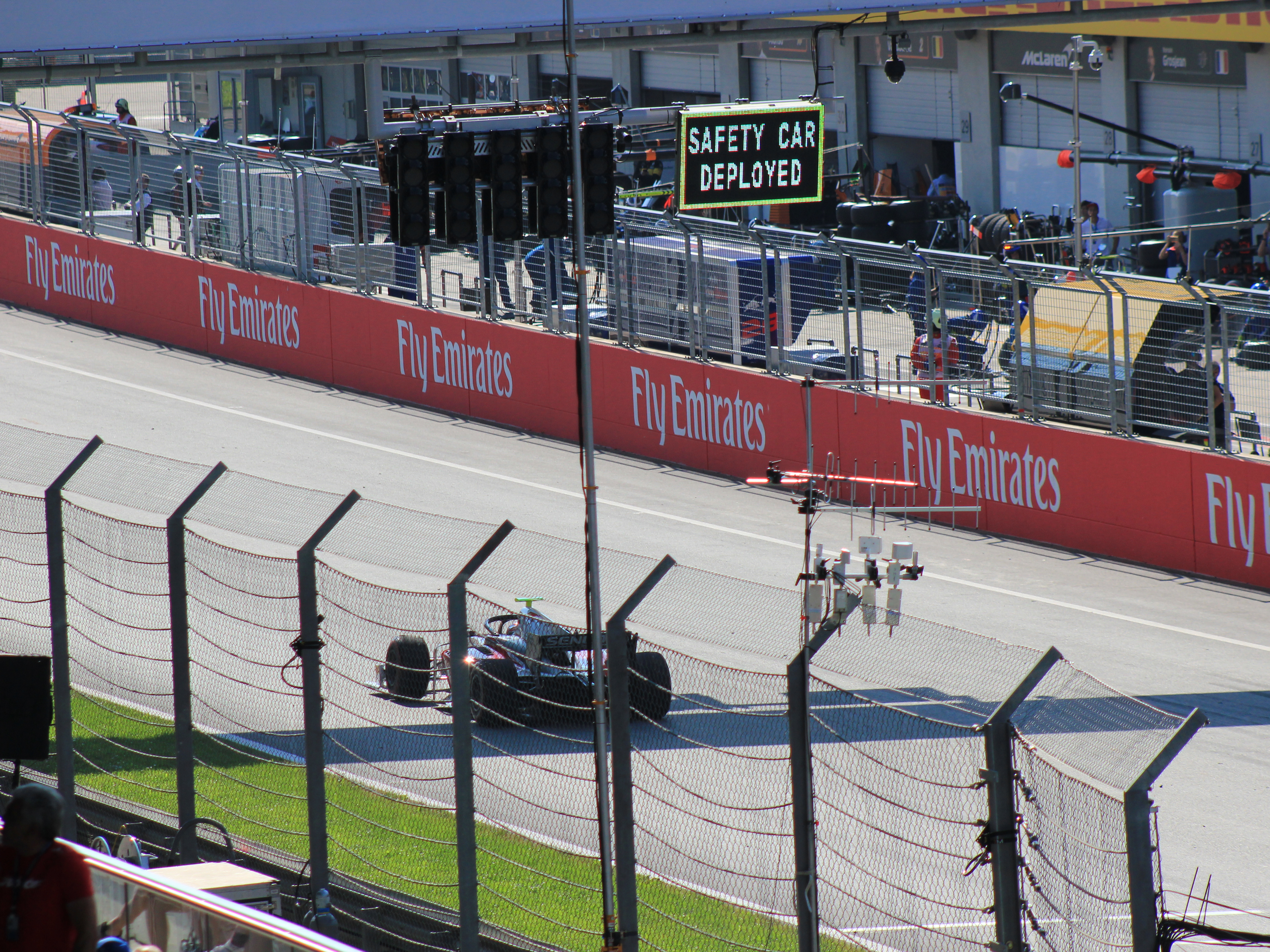
Safety car during the feature race

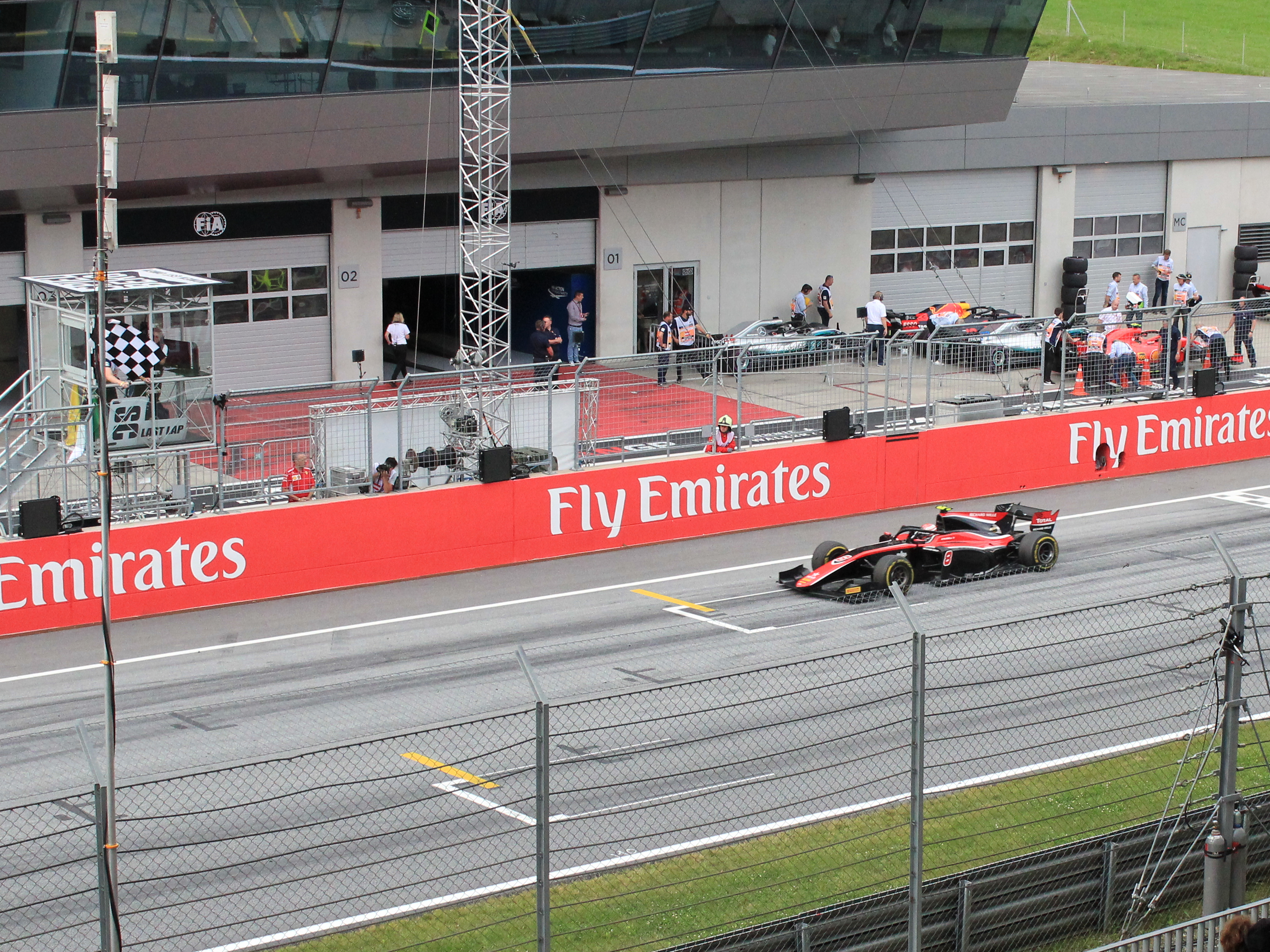
George Russell wins the feature race

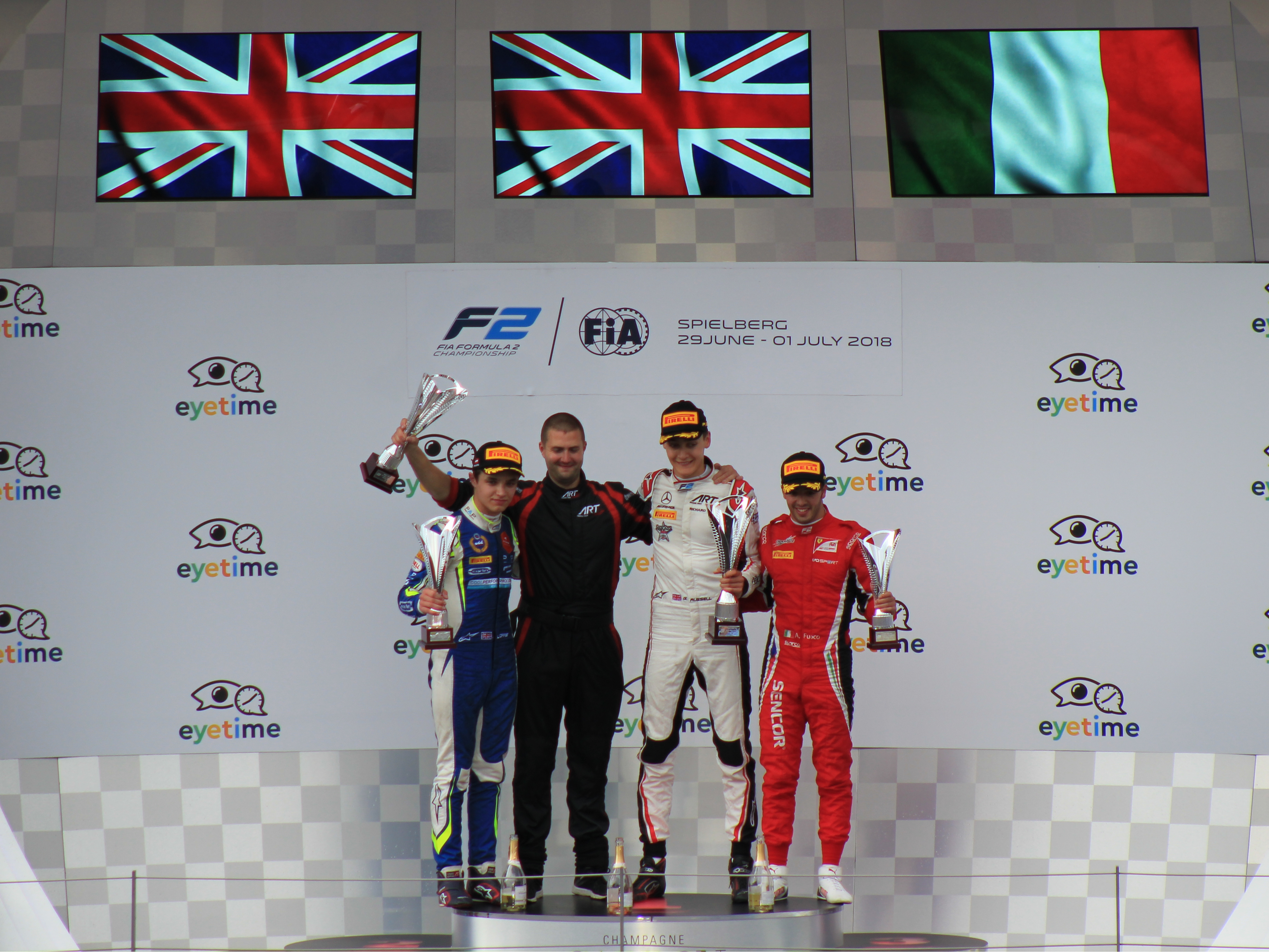
Podium after the feature race

The 2018 Red Bull Ring FIA Formula 2 round was a pair of motor races for Formula 2 cars that took place on 30 June and 1 July 2018 at the Red Bull Ring in Spielberg, Austria as part of the FIA Formula 2 Championship. It was the sixth round of the 2018 FIA Formula 2 Championship and ran in support of the 2018 Austrian Grand Prix.

== Background ==
The round saw the introduction of rolling starts following a series of drivers stalling on the grid in previous rounds. The procedure was introduced in response to a start-line accident in a Formula 3 race that saw a driver crash into a car that had stalled on the grid.

== Classification ==
=== Qualifying ===
Pos.	No.	Driver	Team	Time	Gap	Grid
1	8	(United Kingdom) George Russell	ART Grand Prix	1:13.541	–	1
2	19	(United Kingdom) Lando Norris	Carlin	1:13.779	+0.238	2
3	18	(Brazil) Sérgio Sette Câmara	Carlin	1:13.823	+0.282	3
4	7	(United Kingdom) Jack Aitken	ART Grand Prix	1:13.961	+0.420	4
5	16	(India) Arjun Maini	Trident	1:13.999	+0.458	5
6	11	(Germany) Maximilian Günther	BWT Arden	1:14.014	+0.563	6
7	20	(Switzerland) Louis Delétraz	Charouz Racing System	1:14.104	+0.653	7
8	5	(Thailand) Alexander Albon	DAMS	1:14.115	+0.574	8
9	4	(Netherlands) Nyck de Vries	Pertamina Prema Theodore Racing	1:14.171	+0.630	9
10	2	(Japan) Tadasuke Makino	Russian Time	1:14.201	+0.660	10
11	14	(Italy) Luca Ghiotto	Campos Vexatec Racing	1:14.309	+0.768	11
12	9	(Spain) Roberto Merhi	MP Motorsport	1:14.323	+0.782	12
13	21	(Italy) Antonio Fuoco	Charouz Racing System	1:14.330	+0.789	13
14	17	(United States) Santino Ferrucci	Trident	1:14.334	+0.793	14
15	3	(Indonesia) Sean Gelael	Pertamina Prema Theodore Racing	1:14.363	+0.822	15
16	10	(Switzerland) Ralph Boschung	MP Motorsport	1:14.389	+0.848	16
17	12	(Japan) Nirei Fukuzumi	BWT Arden	1:14.400	+0.859	17
18	1	(Russia) Artem Markelov	Russian Time	1:14.589	+1.048	18
19	6	(Canada) Nicholas Latifi	DAMS	1:14.700	+1.159	19
20	15	(Israel) Roy Nissany	Campos Vexatec Racing	1:15.436	+1.895	20

=== Feature race ===
Pos.	No.	Driver	Team	Laps	Time/Retired	Grid	Points
1	8	(United Kingdom) George Russell	ART Grand Prix	40	56:16.865	1	25 (4)
2	19	(United Kingdom) Lando Norris	Carlin	40	+5.131	2	18
3	21	(Italy) Antonio Fuoco	Charouz Racing System	40	+9.633	13	15
4	9	(Spain) Roberto Merhi	MP Motorsport	40	+11.796	12	12
5	5	(Thailand) Alexander Albon	DAMS	40	+14.643	8	10
6	18	(Brazil) Sérgio Sette Câmara	Carlin	40	+16.900	3	8
7	2	(Japan) Tadasuke Makino	Russian Time	40	+18.834	10	6
8	1	(Russia) Artem Markelov	Russian Time	40	+24.690	18	4 (2)
9	12	(Japan) Nirei Fukuzumi	BWT Arden	40	+25.528	17	2
10	17	(United States) Santino Ferrucci	Trident	40	+26.585	14	1
11	6	(Canada) Nicholas Latifi	DAMS	40	+27.406	19	
12	14	(Italy) Luca Ghiotto	Campos Vexatec Racing	40	+29.485	11	
13	3	(Indonesia) Sean Gelael	Pertamina Prema Theodore Racing	40	+37.135	15	
14	16	(India) Arjun Maini	Trident	40	+39.355	5	
15	11	(Germany) Maximilian Günther	BWT Arden	40	+49.153^{1}	6	
DNF	20	(Switzerland) Louis Delétraz	Charouz Racing System	32	Engine	7	
DNF	7	(United Kingdom) Jack Aitken	ART Grand Prix	19	Engine	4	
DNF	4	(Netherlands) Nyck de Vries	Pertamina Prema Theodore Racing	7	Puncture	9	
DNF	10	(Switzerland) Ralph Boschung	MP Motorsport	4	Mechanical	16	
DNF	15	(Israel) Roy Nissany	Campos Vexatec Racing	3	Accident	20	
Fastest lap: Artem Markelov (Russian Time) 1:17.062 (on lap 38)

Notes

- ^1– Maximilian Günther had 20 seconds (equivalent to a stop and go penalty) added to his race time for an unsafe release.

=== Sprint race ===
Pos.	No.	Driver	Team	Laps	Time/Retired	Grid	Points
1	1	(Russia) Artem Markelov	Russian Time	28	36:41.950	1	15 (2)
2	8	(United Kingdom) George Russell	ART Grand Prix	28	+5.601	8	12
3	18	(Brazil) Sérgio Sette Câmara	Carlin	28	+8.543	3	10
4	21	(Italy) Antonio Fuoco	Charouz Racing System	28	+17.189	6	8
5	5	(Thailand) Alexander Albon	DAMS	28	+17.925	4	6
6	2	(Japan) Tadasuke Makino	Russian Time	28	+22.580	2	4
7	17	(United States) Santino Ferrucci	Trident	28	+24.588	10	2
8	6	(Canada) Nicholas Latifi	DAMS	28	+27.286	11	1
9	12	(Japan) Nirei Fukuzumi	BWT Arden	28	+28.046	9	
10	16	(India) Arjun Maini	Trident	28	+28.665	14	
11	19	(United Kingdom) Lando Norris	Carlin	28	+30.190	7	
12	11	(Germany) Maximilian Günther	BWT Arden	28	+30.800	15	
13	14	(Italy) Luca Ghiotto	Campos Vexatec Racing	28	+32.189	12	
14	4	(Netherlands) Nyck de Vries	Pertamina Prema Theodore Racing	28	+32.953	18	
15	10	(Switzerland) Ralph Boschung	MP Motorsport	28	+36.952	19	
16	9	(Spain) Roberto Merhi	MP Motorsport	28	+38.895	5	
17	15	(Israel) Roy Nissany	Campos Vexatec Racing	28	+44.100	20	
18	7	(United Kingdom) Jack Aitken	ART Grand Prix	28	+44.249	17	
DNF	20	(Switzerland) Louis Delétraz	Charouz Racing System	23	Collision Damage	16	
DNF	3	(Indonesia) Sean Gelael	Pertamina Prema Theodore Racing	22	Puncture	13	
Fastest lap: Artem Markelov (Russian Time) 1:17.365 (on lap 6)

== Championship standings after the round ==
Drivers' Championship standings

	Pos.	Driver	Points
1	1	(United Kingdom) George Russell	132
1	2	(United Kingdom) Lando Norris	122
2	3	(Russia) Artem Markelov	94
	4	(Thailand) Alexander Albon	89
1	5	(Brazil) Sérgio Sette Câmara	86

Teams' Championship standings

	Pos.	Team	Points
	1	(United Kingdom) Carlin	208
	2	(France) ART Grand Prix	181
2	3	(Czech Republic) Charouz Racing System	126
1	4	(France) DAMS	123
1	5	(Russia) Russian Time	112

- Note: Only the top five positions are included for both sets of standings.

== See also ==
- 2018 Austrian Grand Prix
- 2018 Spielberg GP3 Series round

Previous round: 2018 Le Castellet Formula 2 round	FIA Formula 2 Championship; 2018 season	Next round: 2018 Silverstone Formula 2 round
Previous round: 2017 Spielberg Formula 2 round	Red Bull Ring Formula 2 round	Next round: 2019 Spielberg Formula 2 round
