= 2018 Silverstone Formula 2 round =

(United Kingdom) 2018 Silverstone Formula 2 round
Round details
- Round 7 of 12 in the 2018 FIA Formula 2 Championship.
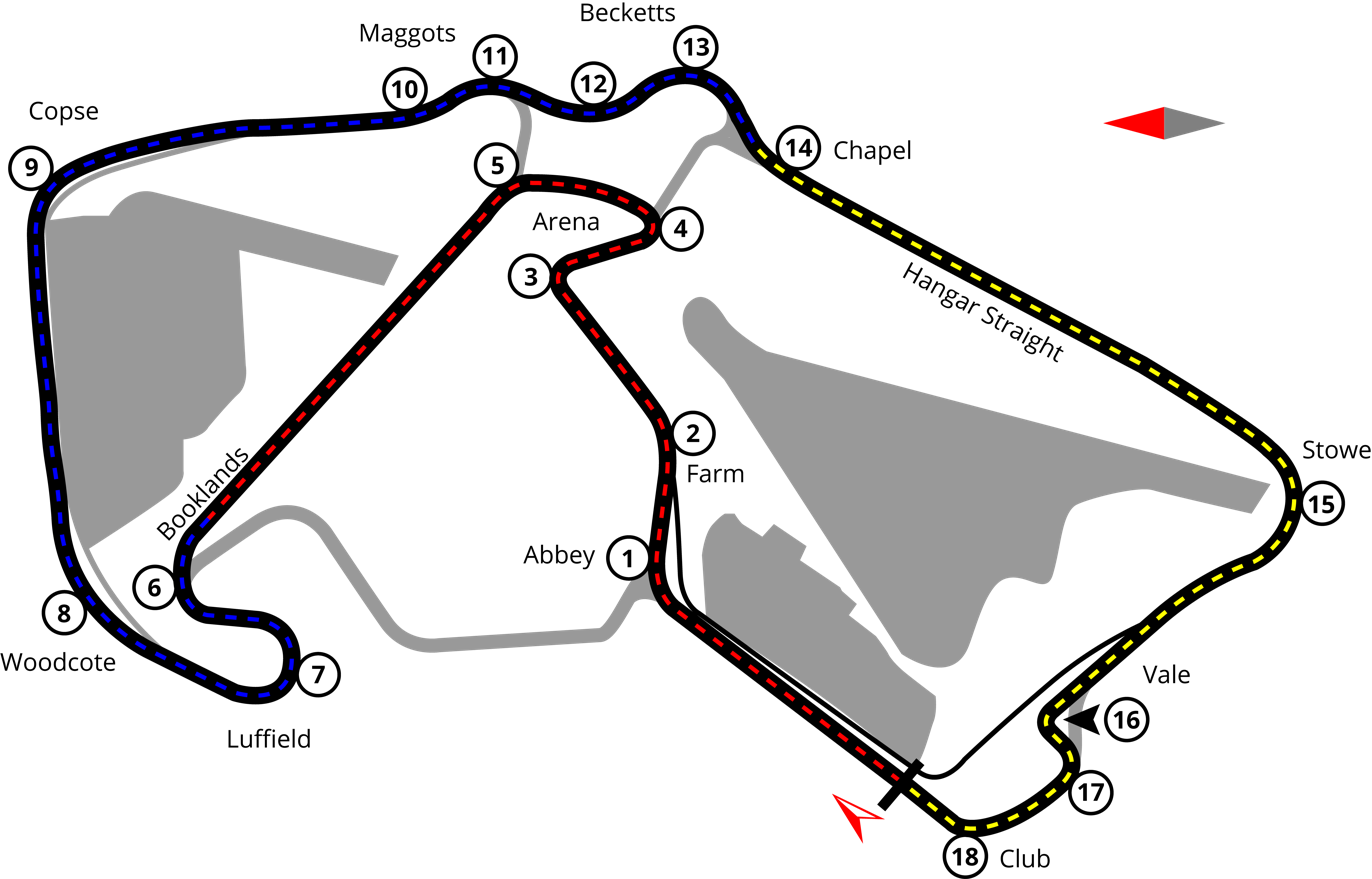
- Layout of the Silverstone Circuit
- Location: Silverstone Circuit, Silverstone, United Kingdom
- Course: Permanent racing facility 5.891 km (3.660 mi)

Feature race
- Date: 7 July 2018
- Laps: 29
Pole position
Driver	(United Kingdom) George Russell	ART Grand Prix
Time	1:39.989	
Podium
First	(Thailand) Alexander Albon	DAMS
Second	(United Kingdom) George Russell	ART Grand Prix
Third	(Italy) Antonio Fuoco	Charouz Racing System
Fastest lap
Driver	(United Kingdom) George Russell	ART Grand Prix
- Time: 1:44.448 (on lap 28)

Sprint race
- Date: 8 July 2018
- Laps: 21
Podium
First	(Germany) Maximilian Günther	BWT Arden
Second	(United Kingdom) George Russell	ART Grand Prix
Third	(United Kingdom) Lando Norris	Carlin
Fastest lap
Driver	(Brazil) Sérgio Sette Câmara	Carlin
- Time: 1:43.318 (on lap 14)

The 2018 Silverstone FIA Formula 2 round was a pair of motor races held on 7 and 8 July 2018 at the Silverstone Circuit in Silverstone, United Kingdom as part of the FIA Formula 2 Championship. It was the seventh round of the 2018 FIA Formula 2 Championship and ran in support of the 2018 British Grand Prix.

ART Grand Prix driver George Russell entered the round with a ten-point lead over Lando Norris in the drivers' championship. In the teams' championship, Carlin held a twenty-seven point lead over ART Grand Prix.

This round was also notable for a collision at the end of the sprint race involving Trident teammates Arjun Maini and Santino Ferrucci. Ferrucci was deemed to have deliberately hit the back of Maini's car on the cooldown lap, and he was then banned for the next two rounds by the FIA. He was then sacked from Trident ten days later due to sponsorship issues, and his replacement would be their GP3 Series driver Alessio Lorandi.

== Report ==
=== Background ===
The round saw the continued use of rolling starts following a series of drivers stalling on the grid in previous rounds. The procedure was introduced at the previous round in response to a start-line accident in a Formula 3 race that saw a driver crash into a car that had stalled on the grid.

The circuit featured three Drag Reduction System (DRS) zones. The two used in previous years—positioned on the Wellington and Hangar Straights—returned, with a third zone placed on the main straight. As DRS is deactivated when the driver brakes, drivers were able to use the system through the Abbey and Farm corners as these corners could be taken flat-out when the car is low on fuel. This brought increased risk as DRS reduces drag by reducing downforce, with aerodynamic grip improving the car's ability to take corners at speed. Drivers were able to manually deactivate DRS before the corners if they were unable or unwilling to take the corner without the use of DRS. The race marked the first time that drivers were able to use DRS through corners.

== Classification ==
=== Qualifying ===
Pos.	No.	Driver	Team	Time	Gap	Grid
1	8	(United Kingdom) George Russell	ART Grand Prix	1:39.989	–	1
2	5	(Thailand) Alexander Albon	DAMS	1:40.065	+0.076	2
3	21	(Italy) Antonio Fuoco	Charouz Racing System	1:40.094	+0.105	3
4	20	(Switzerland) Louis Delétraz	Charouz Racing System	1:40.190	+0.201	4
5	18	(Brazil) Sérgio Sette Câmara	Carlin	1:40.234	+0.245	5
6	19	(United Kingdom) Lando Norris	Carlin	1:40.396	+0.407	6
7	16	(India) Arjun Maini	Trident	1:40.512	+0.523	7
8	1	(Russia) Artem Markelov	Russian Time	1:40.590	+0.601	8
9	14	(Italy) Luca Ghiotto	Campos Vexatec Racing	1:40.707	+0.718	9
10	11	(Germany) Maximilian Günther	BWT Arden	1:40.786	+0.797	10
11	4	(Netherlands) Nyck de Vries	Pertamina Prema Theodore Racing	1:40.847	+0.858	11
12	7	(United Kingdom) Jack Aitken	ART Grand Prix	1:40.863	+0.874	12
13	9	(Spain) Roberto Merhi	MP Motorsport	1:40.994	+1.005	13
14	10	(Switzerland) Ralph Boschung	MP Motorsport	1:41.031	+1.042	14
15	3	(Indonesia) Sean Gelael	Pertamina Prema Theodore Racing	1:41.052	+1.063	15
16	6	(Canada) Nicholas Latifi	DAMS	1:41.061	+1.072	16
17	17	(United States) Santino Ferrucci	Trident	1:41.414	+1.425	17
18	2	(Japan) Tadasuke Makino	Russian Time	1:41.493	+1.504	18
19	12	(Japan) Nirei Fukuzumi	BWT Arden	1:42.081	+2.092	19
20	15	(Israel) Roy Nissany	Campos Vexatec Racing	2:13.133	+33.144	20

=== Feature race ===
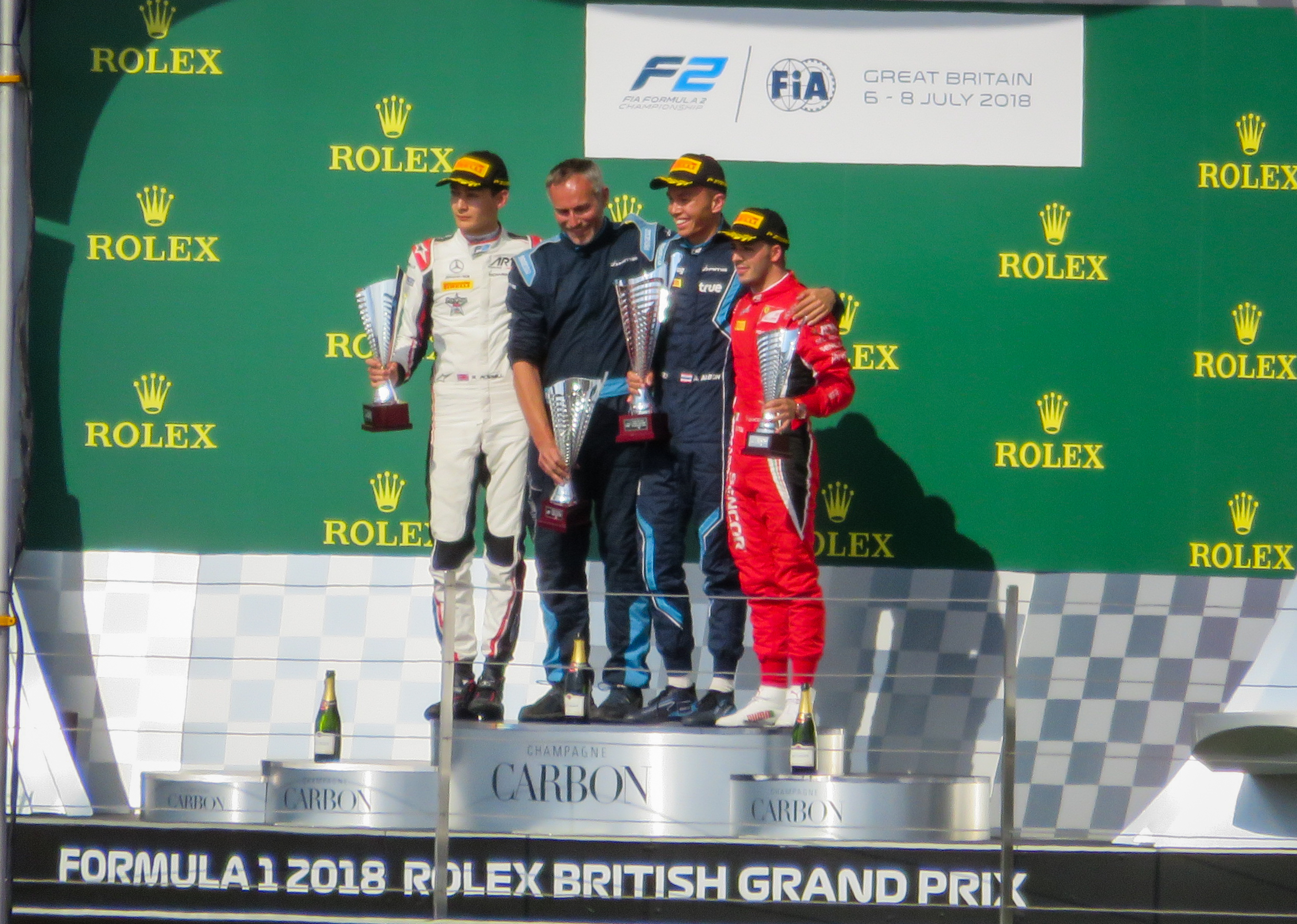
Podium after the feature race.

Pos.	No.	Driver	Team	Laps	Time/Retired	Grid	Points
1	5	(Thailand) Alexander Albon	DAMS	29	52:04.519	2	25
2	8	(United Kingdom) George Russell	ART Grand Prix	29	+9.783^{1}	1	18 (6)
3	21	(Italy) Antonio Fuoco	Charouz Racing System	29	+18.507	3	15
4	20	(Switzerland) Louis Delétraz	Charouz Racing System	29	+26.689	4	12
5	14	(Italy) Luca Ghiotto	Campos Vexatec Racing	29	+27.016	9	10
6	1	(Russia) Artem Markelov	Russian Time	29	+27.107	8	8
7	4	(Netherlands) Nyck de Vries	Pertamina Prema Theodore Racing	29	+28.034	11	6
8	11	(Germany) Maximilian Günther	BWT Arden	29	+34.020	10	4
9	10	(Switzerland) Ralph Boschung	MP Motorsport	29	+37.227	14	2
10	19	(United Kingdom) Lando Norris	Carlin	29	+39.620	6	1
11	9	(Spain) Roberto Merhi	MP Motorsport	29	+39.971	13	
12	2	(Japan) Tadasuke Makino	Russian Time	29	+40.131	18	
13	7	(United Kingdom) Jack Aitken	ART Grand Prix	29	+42.930^{2}	12	
14	16	(India) Arjun Maini	Trident	29	+54.855	7	
15	15	(Israel) Roy Nissany	Campos Vexatec Racing	29	+58.064	20	
16	17	(United States) Santino Ferrucci	Trident	29	+59.394^{3}	17	
17	6	(Canada) Nicholas Latifi	DAMS	29	+59.764	16	
DNF	18	(Brazil) Sérgio Sette Câmara	Carlin	23	Engine	5	
DNF	3	(Indonesia) Sean Gelael	Pertamina Prema Theodore Racing	20	Collision	15	
DNF	12	(Japan) Nirei Fukuzumi	BWT Arden	13	Electrics	19	
Fastest lap: George Russell (ART Grand Prix) 1:44.448 (on lap 28)

Notes

- ^1 – George Russell had five seconds added to his race time for speeding in the pit lane.
- ^2 – Jack Aitken had ten seconds added to his race time; five for speeding in the pit lane and five for a VSC infringement.
- ^3 – Santino Ferrucci had five seconds added to his race time for forcing Arjun Maini off the circuit.

=== Sprint race ===
Pos.	No.	Driver	Team	Laps	Time/Retired	Grid	Points
1	11	(Germany) Maximilian Günther	BWT Arden	21	37:09.802	1	15
2	8	(United Kingdom) George Russell	ART Grand Prix	21	+0.520	7	12 (2)
3	19	(United Kingdom) Lando Norris	Carlin	21	+2.504	10	10
4	1	(Russia) Artem Markelov	Russian Time	21	+9.924	3	8
5	20	(Switzerland) Louis Delétraz	Charouz Racing System	21	+12.005	5	6
6	4	(Netherlands) Nyck de Vries	Pertamina Prema Theodore Racing	21	+13.929	2	4
7	5	(Thailand) Alexander Albon	DAMS	21	+14.006	8	2
8	10	(Switzerland) Ralph Boschung	MP Motorsport	21	+14.684	9	1
9	9	(Spain) Roberto Merhi	MP Motorsport	21	+16.487	11	
10	14	(Italy) Luca Ghiotto	Campos Vexatec Racing	21	+18.051^{1}	4	
11	2	(Japan) Tadasuke Makino	Russian Time	21	+19.632	12	
12	7	(United Kingdom) Jack Aitken	ART Grand Prix	21	+23.653	13	
13	16	(India) Arjun Maini	Trident	21	+24.040	14	
14	15	(Israel) Roy Nissany	Campos Vexatec Racing	21	+32.165	15	
15	3	(Indonesia) Sean Gelael	Pertamina Prema Theodore Racing	21	+33.318	19	
16	6	(Canada) Nicholas Latifi	DAMS	21	+34.042	17	
17	18	(Brazil) Sérgio Sette Câmara	Carlin	21	+47.912	18	
DNF	21	(Italy) Antonio Fuoco	Charouz Racing System	14	Collision	6	
DNS	12	(Japan) Nirei Fukuzumi	BWT Arden	0	Transmission	20	
DSQ	17	(United States) Santino Ferrucci	Trident	21	Disqualified^{2}	16	
Fastest lap: Sérgio Sette Câmara (Carlin) 1:43.318 (on lap 14)^{3}

Notes

- ^1 – Luca Ghiotto received a 5-second time penalty for failing to maintain the minimum delta time at the end of the virtual safety car period.
- ^2 – Santino Ferrucci has been disqualified from the Sprint race and banned for the next two rounds by the FIA following collision with teammate Arjun Maini.
- ^3 – Sérgio Sette Câmara set the fastest lap in the race but because he finished outside the top 10, the two bonus points for fastest lap went to George Russell as he set the fastest lap inside the top 10 finishers.

== Championship standings after the round ==
Drivers' Championship standings

	Pos.	Driver	Points
	1	(United Kingdom) George Russell	170
	2	(United Kingdom) Lando Norris	133
1	3	(Thailand) Alexander Albon	115
1	4	(Russia) Artem Markelov	110
1	5	(Italy) Antonio Fuoco	97

Teams' Championship standings

	Pos.	Team	Points
1	1	(France) ART Grand Prix	219
1	2	(United Kingdom) Carlin	219
	3	(Czech Republic) Charouz Racing System	159
	4	(France) DAMS	149
	5	(Russia) Russian Time	128

== See also ==
- 2018 British Grand Prix
- 2018 Silverstone GP3 Series round

Previous round: 2018 Spielberg Formula 2 round	FIA Formula 2 Championship; 2018 season	Next round: 2018 Budapest Formula 2 round
Previous round: 2017 Silverstone Formula 2 round	Silverstone Formula 2 round	Next round: 2019 Silverstone Formula 2 round
