= 2017 Monza Formula 2 round =

Motor racing competition

(Italy) 2017 Monza Formula 2 round
Round details
- Round 9 of 11 in the 2017 FIA Formula 2 Championship.
- Layout of the Autodromo Nazionale Monza
- Location: Autodromo Nazionale Monza, Monza, Italy
- Course: Permanent racing facility 5.793 km (3.600 mi)

Feature race
- Date: 2 September 2017
- Laps: 23
Pole position
Driver	(Japan) Nobuharu Matsushita	ART Grand Prix
Time	1:30.982	
Podium
First	(Italy) Antonio Fuoco	Prema Racing
Second	(Japan) Nobuharu Matsushita	ART Grand Prix
Third	(Canada) Nicholas Latifi	DAMS
Fastest lap
Driver	(Canada) Nicholas Latifi	DAMS
- Time: 1:47.648 (on lap 23)

Sprint race
- Date: 3 September 2017
- Laps: 21
Podium
First	(Italy) Luca Ghiotto	Russian Time
Second	(Brazil) Sérgio Sette Câmara	MP Motorsport
Third	(Italy) Antonio Fuoco	Prema Racing
Fastest lap
Driver	(Italy) Antonio Fuoco	Prema Racing
- Time: 1:34.080 (on lap 4)

The 2017 Monza FIA Formula 2 round was a pair of motor races held on 2 and 3 September 2017 at the Autodromo Nazionale Monza in Monza, Italy as part of the FIA Formula 2 Championship. It was the ninth round of the 2017 FIA Formula 2 Championship and was run in support of the 2017 Italian Grand Prix.

== Classifications ==
=== Qualifying ===
Pos.	No.	Driver	Team	Time	Gap	Grid
1	7	(Japan) Nobuharu Matsushita	ART Grand Prix	1:30.982	—	1
2	3	(Netherlands) Nyck de Vries	Racing Engineering	1:31.071	+0.089	2
3	18	(Switzerland) Louis Delétraz	Rapax	1:31.239	+0.257	3
4	6	(Russia) Artem Markelov	Russian Time	1:31.266	+0.284	4
5	19	(Spain) Roberto Merhi	Rapax	1:31.323	+0.341	5
6	15	(United Kingdom) Jordan King	MP Motorsport	1:31.355	+0.373	6
7	1	(Monaco) Charles Leclerc	Prema Racing	1:31.378	+0.396	7
8	2	(Italy) Antonio Fuoco	Prema Racing	1:31.426	+0.444	8
9	17	(United States) Santino Ferrucci	Trident	1:31.482	+0.500	9
10	8	(Thailand) Alexander Albon	ART Grand Prix	1:31.511	+0.529	10
11	5	(Italy) Luca Ghiotto	Russian Time	1:31.529	+0.547	11
12	14	(Brazil) Sérgio Sette Câmara	MP Motorsport	1:31.653	+0.671	12
13	9	(United Kingdom) Oliver Rowland	DAMS	1:31.711	+0.729	13
14	10	(Canada) Nicholas Latifi	DAMS	1:31.747	+0.765	14
15	20	(France) Norman Nato	Arden International	1:31.772	+0.790	15
16	11	(Switzerland) Ralph Boschung	Campos Racing	1:31.878	+0.896	16
17	4	(Sweden) Gustav Malja	Racing Engineering	1:31.942	+0.960	17
18	21	(Indonesia) Sean Gelael	Arden International	1:32.171	+1.189	18
19	12	(Romania) Robert Vișoiu	Campos Racing	1:32.267	+1.285	19
20	16	(Malaysia) Nabil Jeffri	Trident	1:32.373	+1.391	20

=== Feature Race ===
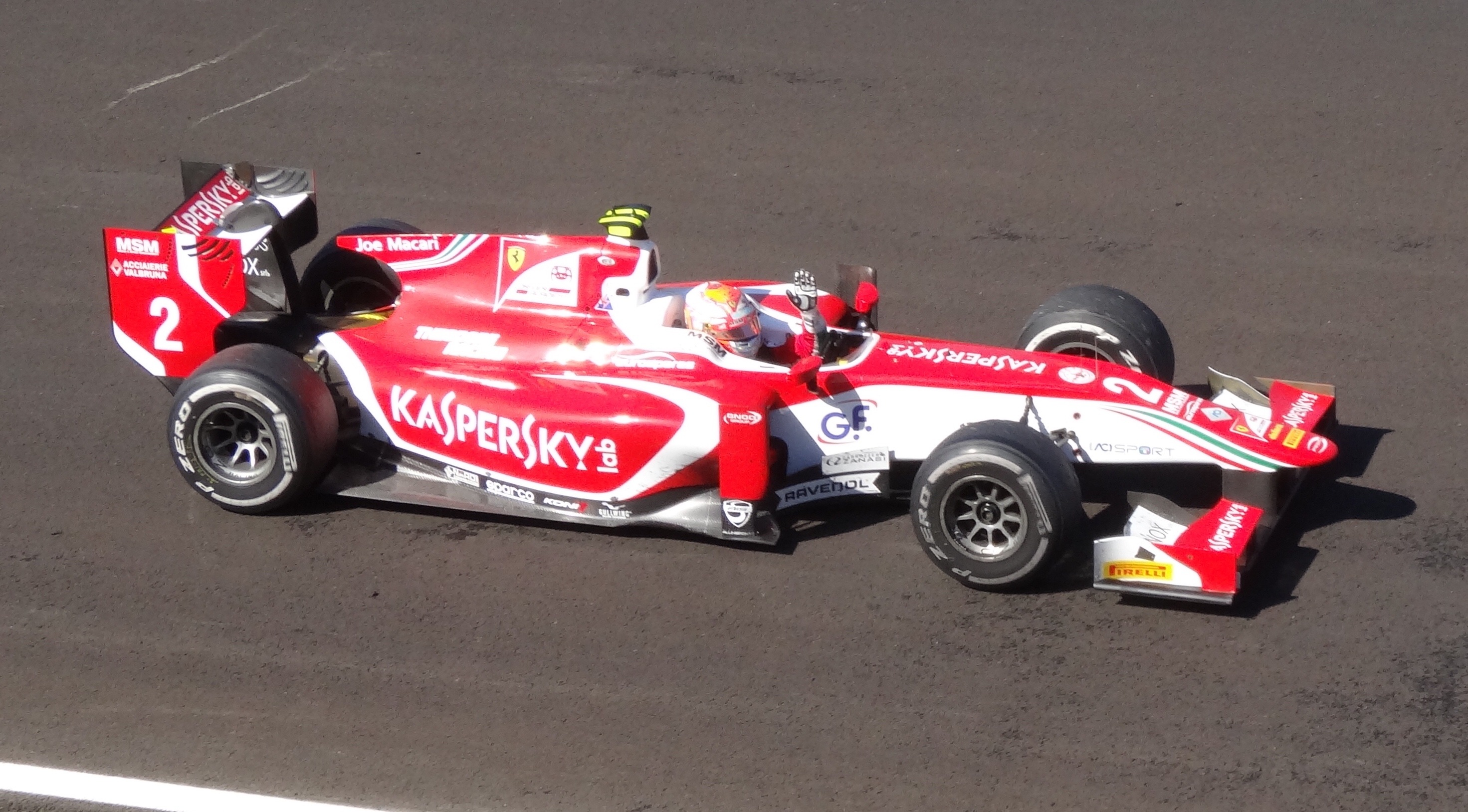
Antonio Fuoco

Pos.	No.	Driver	Team	Laps	Time/Retired	Grid	Points
1	2	(Italy) Antonio Fuoco	Prema Racing	23	44:10.800	8	25
2	7	(Japan) Nobuharu Matsushita	ART Grand Prix	23	+0.351	1	18 (4)
3	10	(Canada) Nicholas Latifi	DAMS	23	+1.477	14	15 (2)
4	5	(Italy) Luca Ghiotto	Russian Time	23	+3.085	11	12
5	21	(Indonesia) Sean Gelael	Arden International	23	+3.844	18	10
6	14	(Brazil) Sérgio Sette Câmara	MP Motorsport	23	+5.268	12	8
7	18	(Switzerland) Louis Delétraz	Rapax	23	+6.031	3	6
8	4	(Sweden) Gustav Malja	Racing Engineering	23	+6.930	17	4
9	6	(Russia) Artem Markelov	Russian Time	23	+7.878	4	2
10	15	(United Kingdom) Jordan King	MP Motorsport	23	+8.219	6	1
11	19	(Spain) Roberto Merhi	Rapax	23	+9.712	5	
12	16	(Malaysia) Nabil Jeffri	Trident	23	+11.679	20	
13	20	(France) Norman Nato	Arden International	23	+11.979	15	
14	8	(Thailand) Alexander Albon	ART Grand Prix	23	+12.046	10	
15	11	(Switzerland) Ralph Boschung	Campos Racing	23	+12.406	16	
16	12	(Romania) Robert Vișoiu	Campos Racing	23	+13.531	19	
17	1	(Monaco) Charles Leclerc	Prema Racing	23	+33.989	7	
18	3	(Netherlands) Nyck de Vries	Racing Engineering	23	+1:12.409	2	
DNF	9	(United Kingdom) Oliver Rowland	DAMS	18	Wheel	13	
DNF	17	(United States) Santino Ferrucci	Trident	5	Water pressure	9	
Fastest lap: (Canada) Nicholas Latifi (DAMS) – 1:47.648 (on lap 23)

=== Sprint Race ===
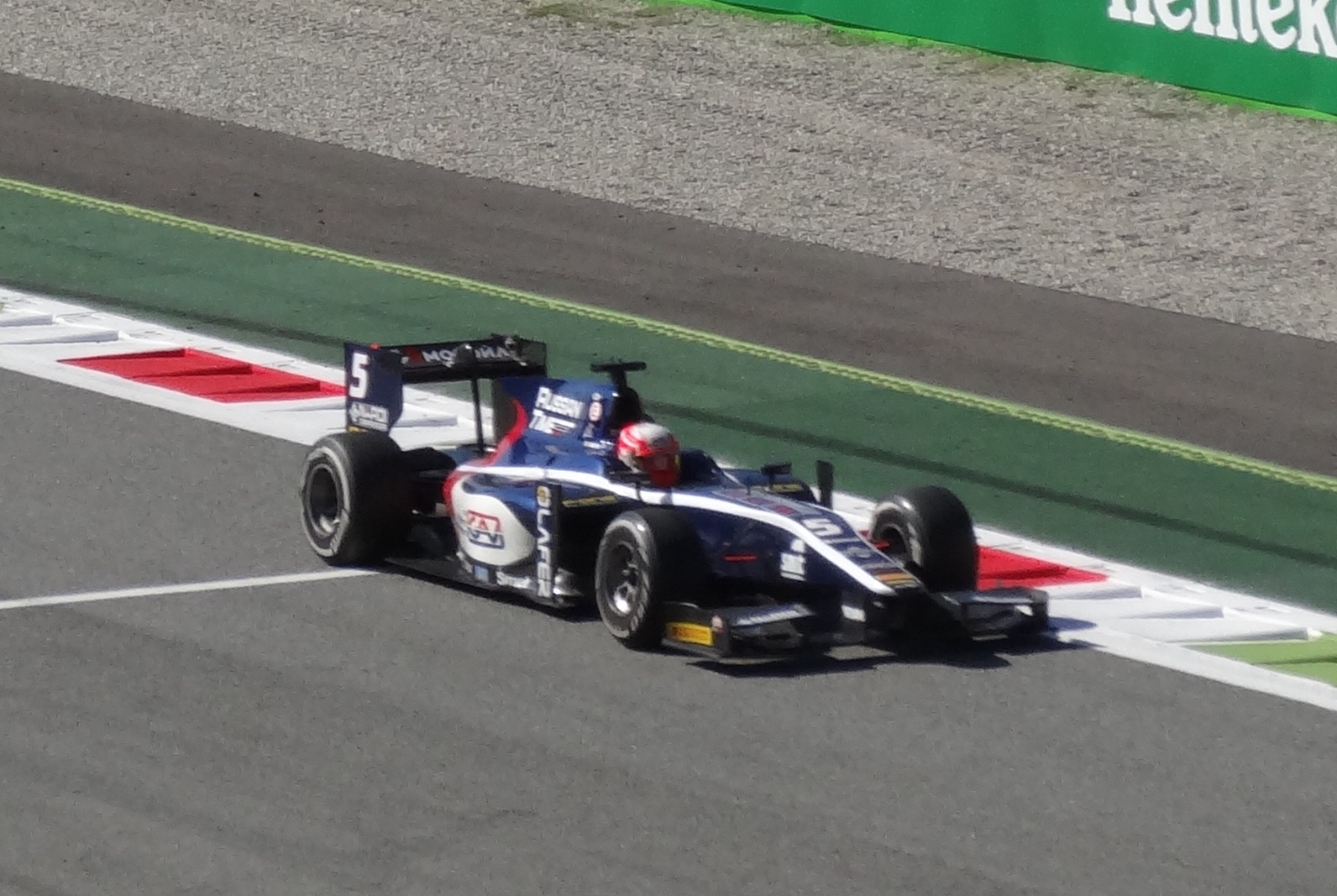
Luca Ghiotto

Pos.	No.	Driver	Team	Laps	Time/Retired	Grid	Points
1	5	(Italy) Luca Ghiotto	Russian Time	21	33:15.078	4	15
2	14	(Brazil) Sérgio Sette Câmara	MP Motorsport	21	+2.296	6	12
3	2	(Italy) Antonio Fuoco	Prema Racing	21	+4.505	1	10 (2)
4	18	(Switzerland) Louis Delétraz	Rapax	23	+6.246	7	8
5	19	(Spain) Roberto Merhi	Rapax	21	+11.803	11	6
6	21	(Indonesia) Sean Gelael	Arden International	21	+17.305	5	4
7	7	(Japan) Nobuharu Matsushita	ART Grand Prix	21	+20.010	2	2
8	8	(Thailand) Alexander Albon	ART Grand Prix	21	+20.588	14	1
9	1	(Monaco) Charles Leclerc	Prema Racing	21	+23.263	17	
10	20	(France) Norman Nato	Arden International	21	+23.704	13	
11	9	(United Kingdom) Oliver Rowland	DAMS	21	+27.419	19	
12	3	(Netherlands) Nyck de Vries	Racing Engineering	21	+29.307	18	
13	11	(Switzerland) Ralph Boschung	Campos Racing	21	+29.659	15	
14	17	(United States) Santino Ferrucci	Trident	21	+29.906	20	
15	6	(Russia) Artem Markelov	Russian Time	21	+32.045	9	
16	10	(Canada) Nicholas Latifi	DAMS	21	+32.965	3	
17	16	(Malaysia) Nabil Jeffri	Trident	21	+33.237	12	
18	4	(Sweden) Gustav Malja	Racing Engineering	21	+57.447	8	
19	12	(Romania) Robert Vișoiu	Campos Racing	21	+1:00.129	16	
20	15	(United Kingdom) Jordan King	MP Motorsport	21	+1.06.302	10	
Fastest lap: (Italy) Antonio Fuoco (Prema Racing) – 1:34.080 (on lap 4)

== Championship standings after the round ==
Drivers' Championship standings

Pos.	Driver	Points
1	(Monaco) Charles Leclerc	218
2	(United Kingdom) Oliver Rowland	159
3	(Russia) Artem Markelov	152
4	(Italy) Luca Ghiotto	150
5	(Canada) Nicholas Latifi	132

Teams' Championship standings

	Pos.	Team	Points
1	1	(Russia) Russian Time	302
1	2	(Italy) Prema Racing	295
2	3	(France) DAMS	291
	4	(France) ART Grand Prix	190
	5	(Italy) Rapax	136

- Note: Only the top five positions are included for both sets of standings.

== See also ==
- 2017 Italian Grand Prix
- 2017 Monza GP3 Series round

Previous round: 2017 Spa-Francorchamps Formula 2 round	FIA Formula 2 Championship; 2017 season	Next round: 2017 Jerez Formula 2 round
Previous round: 2016 Monza GP2 Series round	Monza Formula 2 round	Next round: 2018 Monza Formula 2 round
