= 2018 French Grand Prix =

Race 8 of 21 in the 2018 Formula One World Championship
← Previous race	Next race →
- Layout of the Circuit Paul Ricard in 2018

Race details
- Date: 24 June 2018
- Official name: Formula 1 Pirelli Grand Prix de France 2018
- Location: Circuit Paul Ricard; Le Castellet, Provence-Alpes-Côte d'Azur, France
- Course: Permanent racing circuit
- Course length: 5.842 km (3.630 miles)
- Distance: 53 laps, 309.690 km (192.432 miles)
- Weather: Partially cloudy, warm and dry

Pole position
Driver	(United Kingdom) Lewis Hamilton	Mercedes
- Time: 1:30.029

Fastest lap
Driver	(Finland) Valtteri Bottas	Mercedes
- Time: 1:34.225 on lap 41

Podium
First	(United Kingdom) Lewis Hamilton	Mercedes
Second	(Netherlands) Max Verstappen	Red Bull Racing-TAG Heuer
Third	(Finland) Kimi Räikkönen	Ferrari

The 2018 French Grand Prix (formally known as the Formula 1 Pirelli Grand Prix de France 2018) was a Formula One motor race that took place on 24 June 2018 at the Circuit Paul Ricard in Le Castellet, France. The race was the eighth round of the 2018 FIA Formula One World Championship and marked the first time that the French Grand Prix has been run since 2008. It was the 87th running of the French Grand Prix, and the 59th time the event had been included as a round of the Formula One World Championship since the inception of the series in 1950.

Ferrari driver Sebastian Vettel entered the race with a one-point lead over Lewis Hamilton in the World Drivers' Championship. In the World Constructors' Championship, Mercedes led Ferrari by seventeen points. Hamilton took the lead in the Driver's Championship by winning the race, with Vettel finishing fifth.

== Background ==
The race returned to the calendar for the first time since 2008, with Circuit Paul Ricard chosen as the venue. The circuit last hosted the French Grand Prix in 1990 before the event moved to the Circuit de Nevers Magny-Cours in 1991. The race used the 5.842 km (3.630 mi) layout of the Circuit Paul Ricard for the first time. The layout includes a chicane on the Mistral straight as opposed to the 5.809 km (3.610 mi) circuit that was used nine times between 1971 and 1985. (Note: The French Grand Prix used the short 3.812 km (2.369 mi) configuration of the Circuit Paul Ricard between 1986 and 1990.)

The race was run in June, filling the vacancy left by the Azerbaijan Grand Prix, which was moved to an April date to avoid clashing with celebrations for the centenary of the Azerbaijan Democratic Republic.

=== Drag reduction system ===
The circuit featured two drag reduction system (DRS) zones. The first was located along the main straight, while the second was on the Mistral Straight on the approach to the chicane.

=== Tyres ===
Tyre supplier Pirelli provided teams with the soft, supersoft and ultrasoft compounds of tyres. They reverted to their narrow tread compound following feedback from the teams in the wake of mid-season testing at the Circuit de Barcelona-Catalunya.

== Free practice ==
Lewis Hamilton set the fastest lap in the first free practice session, which was cut short by an accident involving Sauber driver Marcus Ericsson. Ericsson lost control of his Sauber C37 on the approach to Turn 11 and spun into the barrier on the outside of the corner. The car hit the tyre wall at an angle and subsequently caught fire. Ericsson was unharmed, but with two minutes remaining the session was abandoned and the damage to his car so extensive that he was unable to take part in the second free practice session. Several drivers experienced spins during the session, most notably at Turn 6 where an intermittent and gusty local wind caught the drivers unaware as they accelerated away from the apex of the corner. Unlike Ericsson, all of the drivers avoided contact with the wall courtesy of the circuit's unique, abrasive tarmac run-off areas designed to slow down cars that left the circuit.

Hamilton was fastest again in the second free practice session despite having his flying lap interrupted by another red flag. Sergio Pérez lost a wheel as he turned onto the Mistral Straight, prompting race officials to mount an investigation as to whether Force India had released Pérez from the pit lane with his car in an unsafe condition. The session was restarted once Pérez's car was cleared away.

== Qualifying ==
Pos.	No.	Driver	Constructor	Qualifying times			Final grid
Pos.	No.	Driver	Constructor	Q1	Q2	Q3	Final grid
1	44	(United Kingdom) Lewis Hamilton	Mercedes	1:31.271	1:30.645	1:30.029	1
2	77	(Finland) Valtteri Bottas	Mercedes	1:31.776	1:31.227	1:30.147	2
3	5	(Germany) Sebastian Vettel	Ferrari	1:31.820	1:30.751	1:30.400	3
4	33	(Netherlands) Max Verstappen	Red Bull Racing-TAG Heuer	1:31.531	1:30.818	1:30.705	4
5	3	(Australia) Daniel Ricciardo	Red Bull Racing-TAG Heuer	1:31.910	1:31.538	1:30.895	5
6	7	(Finland) Kimi Räikkönen	Ferrari	1:31.567	1:30.772	1:31.057	6
7	55	(Spain) Carlos Sainz Jr.	Renault	1:32.394	1:32.016	1:32.126	7
8	16	(Monaco) Charles Leclerc	Sauber-Ferrari	1:32.538	1:32.055	1:32.635	8
9	20	(Denmark) Kevin Magnussen	Haas-Ferrari	1:32.169	1:31.510	1:32.930	9
10	8	(France) Romain Grosjean	Haas-Ferrari	1:32.083	1:31.472	No time	10
11	31	(France) Esteban Ocon	Force India-Mercedes	1:32.786	1:32.075		11
12	27	(Germany) Nico Hülkenberg	Renault	1:32.949	1:32.115		12
13	11	(Mexico) Sergio Pérez	Force India-Mercedes	1:32.692	1:32.454		13
14	10	(France) Pierre Gasly	Scuderia Toro Rosso-Honda	1:32.447	1:32.460		14
15	9	(Sweden) Marcus Ericsson	Sauber-Ferrari	1:32.804	1:32.820		15
16	14	(Spain) Fernando Alonso	McLaren-Renault	1:32.976			16
17	28	(New Zealand) Brendon Hartley	Scuderia Toro Rosso-Honda	1:33.025			20^{1}
18	2	(Belgium) Stoffel Vandoorne	McLaren-Renault	1:33.162			17
19	35	(Russia) Sergey Sirotkin	Williams-Mercedes	1:33.636			18
20	18	(Canada) Lance Stroll	Williams-Mercedes	1:33.729			19
107% time: 1:37.659

Notes

- ^1 – Brendon Hartley received a 35-place grid penalty for exceeding his quota of power unit components.

== Race ==
=== Race report ===
At the start Sebastian Vettel ran into the back of Valtteri Bottas, with both sustaining damage and having to pit for repairs, also there was a separate collision between Pierre Gasly and Esteban Ocon leaving both cars stranded out on the track, this brought out a brief safety car period lasting till the end of lap 5. Vettel would later receive a penalty for his collision with Bottas which meant he would only manage to finish 5th. Lance Stroll suffered a tyre puncture near the end of the race causing a virtual safety car, which ended with only half a lap left of the race. Lewis Hamilton comfortably won ahead of Max Verstappen, while Kimi Räikkönen completed the podium.

=== Race classification ===
Pos.	No.	Driver	Constructor	Laps	Time/Retired	Grid	Points
1	44	(United Kingdom) Lewis Hamilton	Mercedes	53	1:30:11.385	1	25
2	33	(Netherlands) Max Verstappen	Red Bull Racing-TAG Heuer	53	+7.090	4	18
3	7	(Finland) Kimi Räikkönen	Ferrari	53	+25.888	6	15
4	3	(Australia) Daniel Ricciardo	Red Bull Racing-TAG Heuer	53	+34.736	5	12
5	5	(Germany) Sebastian Vettel	Ferrari	53	+1:01.935	3	10
6	20	(Denmark) Kevin Magnussen	Haas-Ferrari	53	+1:19.364	9	8
7	77	(Finland) Valtteri Bottas	Mercedes	53	+1:20.632	2	6
8	55	(Spain) Carlos Sainz Jr.	Renault	53	+1:27.184	7	4
9	27	(Germany) Nico Hülkenberg	Renault	53	+1:31.989	12	2
10	16	(Monaco) Charles Leclerc	Sauber-Ferrari	53	+1:33.873	8	1
11	8	(France) Romain Grosjean	Haas-Ferrari	52	+1 lap	10	
12	2	(Belgium) Stoffel Vandoorne	McLaren-Renault	52	+1 lap	17	
13	9	(Sweden) Marcus Ericsson	Sauber-Ferrari	52	+1 lap	15	
14	28	(New Zealand) Brendon Hartley	Scuderia Toro Rosso-Honda	52	+1 lap	20	
15	35	(Russia) Sergey Sirotkin	Williams-Mercedes	52	+1 lap^{1}	18	
16^{2}	14	(Spain) Fernando Alonso	McLaren-Renault	50	Suspension	16	
17^{2}	18	(Canada) Lance Stroll	Williams-Mercedes	48	Puncture	19	
Ret	11	(Mexico) Sergio Pérez	Force India-Mercedes	27	Engine	13	
Ret	31	(France) Esteban Ocon	Force India-Mercedes	0	Collision	11	
Ret	10	(France) Pierre Gasly	Scuderia Toro Rosso-Honda	0	Collision	14	

Notes

- ^1 – Sergey Sirotkin had 5 seconds added to his race time for driving unnecessarily slowly behind the safety car.
- ^2 – Fernando Alonso and Lance Stroll retired from the race, but were classified as they completed more than 90% of the race distance.

== Championship standings after the race ==
Drivers' Championship standings

	Pos.	Driver	Points
1	1	(United Kingdom) Lewis Hamilton	145
1	2	(Germany) Sebastian Vettel	131
1	3	(Australia) Daniel Ricciardo	96
1	4	(Finland) Valtteri Bottas	92
	5	(Finland) Kimi Räikkönen	83

Constructors' Championship standings

Pos.	Constructor	Points
1	(Germany) Mercedes	237
2	(Italy) Ferrari	214
3	(Austria) Red Bull Racing-TAG Heuer	164
4	(France) Renault	62
5	(United Kingdom) McLaren-Renault	40

- Note: Only the top five positions are included for both sets of standings.

== See also ==
- 2018 Le Castellet Formula 2 round
- 2018 Le Castellet GP3 Series round

== Notes ==
Previous race: 2018 Canadian Grand Prix	FIA Formula One World Championship; 2018 season	Next race: 2018 Austrian Grand Prix
Previous race: 2008 French Grand Prix; Next race at Paul Ricard: 1990 French Grand Prix	French Grand Prix	Next race: 2019 French Grand Prix
