= 2018 Austrian Grand Prix =

2018 edition of the Austrian Grand Prix

Race 9 of 21 in the 2018 Formula One World Championship
← Previous race	Next race →
- Layout of the Red Bull Ring

Race details
- Date: 1 July 2018
- Official name: Formula 1 Eyetime Grosser Preis von Österreich 2018
- Location: Red Bull Ring; Spielberg, Styria, Austria
- Course: Permanent racing facility
- Course length: 4.318 km (2.683 miles)
- Distance: 71 laps, 306.452 km (190.420 miles)
- Weather: Sunny

Pole position
Driver	(Finland) Valtteri Bottas	Mercedes
- Time: 1:03.130

Fastest lap
Driver	(Finland) Kimi Räikkönen	Ferrari
- Time: 1:06.957 on lap 71

Podium
First	(Netherlands) Max Verstappen	Red Bull Racing-TAG Heuer
Second	(Finland) Kimi Räikkönen	Ferrari
Third	(Germany) Sebastian Vettel	Ferrari

The 2018 Austrian Grand Prix (formally known as the Formula 1 Eyetime Grosser Preis von Österreich 2018) was a Formula One motor race held on 1 July 2018 at the Red Bull Ring in Spielberg, Austria. The race was the 9th round of the 2018 FIA Formula One World Championship, and marked the 32nd running of the Austrian Grand Prix and the 31st time it had been held as a round of the Formula One World Championship since the series inception in 1950.

The race was won by Max Verstappen, driving for Red Bull, marking the first time that Red Bull has won at their home Grand Prix.

== Report ==
=== Background ===
The circuit included three drag reduction system (DRS) zones for the first time. These included a zone along the main straight, with the second zone on the straight from turn 1 to turns 2 and 3, and a third zone extending from turn 3 to turn 4. Mercedes driver Lewis Hamilton entered the round with a 14-point lead over Sebastian Vettel in the Drivers' Championship. In the Constructors' Championship, Mercedes held a 23-point lead over Ferrari.

=== Qualifying ===
In Q2, Carlos Sainz had to avoid Vettel, who was going slowly on the racing line. Vettel was later awarded a 3-place grid penalty for the incident. Mercedes locked out the front row in Q3 and Valtteri Bottas took his first pole of 2018. The Ferraris locked out the second row. Romain Grosjean outqualified Daniel Ricciardo to take P6.

=== Race ===
Bottas had a poor start from pole position. Initially passed by Hamilton, Räikkönen and Verstappen, he reclaimed P2 overtaking Verstappen and Räikkönen around the outside of Turn 4. Shortly after Verstappen overtook Räikkönen for P3. Stoffel Vandoorne broke his front wing at Turn 3, requiring a pitstop, dropping him to the back of the field. On lap 12, Nico Hülkenberg's engine failed on the start/finish straight, causing his immediate retirement from the race. On lap 14, Bottas retired with a gearbox failure which was originally caused by hydraulic problems, causing a Virtual Safety Car. During the VSC period, Ferrari and Red Bull pitted both their cars. Mercedes however, chose not to pit Hamilton, an error for which James Vowles, Mercedes' chief strategist, was heard to apologize via team radio. Hamilton pitted on lap 25, ceding the lead to Verstappen, and rejoined in P4, ahead of Vettel, who overtook him on lap 39. On lap 54 Ricciardo retired with an exhaust problem and then Brendon Hartley retired on the next lap with a hydraulics issue. Hamilton retired on lap 64 with a fuel pressure problem, giving Mercedes only their third double retirement since returning to F1 as a constructor in 2010 (after Australia 2011 and Spain 2016), their first double retirement due to mechanical failures, and Hamilton's first non-finish since the 2016 Malaysian Grand Prix. Verstappen won the race, giving Red Bull their first win at the Red Bull Ring, and Verstappen his first win of the season. The Haas cars finished P4 and P5, giving them their best points finish ever and Grosjean his first points of the season.

== Classification ==
=== Qualifying ===
Pos.	Car no.	Driver	Constructor	Qualifying times			Final grid
Pos.	Car no.	Driver	Constructor	Q1	Q2	Q3	Final grid
1	77	(Finland) Valtteri Bottas	Mercedes	1:04.175	1:03.756	1:03.130	1
2	44	(United Kingdom) Lewis Hamilton	Mercedes	1:04.080	1:03.577	1:03.149	2
3	5	(Germany) Sebastian Vettel	Ferrari	1:04.347	1:03.544	1:03.464	6^{a}
4	7	(Finland) Kimi Räikkönen	Ferrari	1:04.234	1:03.975	1:03.660	3
5	33	(Netherlands) Max Verstappen	Red Bull Racing-TAG Heuer	1:04.273	1:04.001	1:03.840	4
6	8	(France) Romain Grosjean	Haas-Ferrari	1:04.242	1:04.059	1:03.892	5
7	3	(Australia) Daniel Ricciardo	Red Bull Racing-TAG Heuer	1:04.723	1:04.403	1:03.996	7
8	20	(Denmark) Kevin Magnussen	Haas-Ferrari	1:04.460	1:04.291	1:04.051	8
9	55	(Spain) Carlos Sainz Jr.	Renault	1:04.948	1:04.561	1:04.725	9
10	27	(Germany) Nico Hülkenberg	Renault	1:04.864	1:04.676	1:05.019	10
11	31	(France) Esteban Ocon	Force India-Mercedes	1:05.148	1:04.845		11
12	10	(France) Pierre Gasly	Scuderia Toro Rosso-Honda	1:05.011	1:04.874		12
13	16	(Monaco) Charles Leclerc	Sauber-Ferrari	1:04.967	1:04.979		17^{b}
14	14	(Spain) Fernando Alonso	McLaren-Renault	1:04.965	1:05.058		PL^{c}
15	18	(Canada) Lance Stroll	Williams-Mercedes	1:05.264	1:05.286		13
16	2	(Belgium) Stoffel Vandoorne	McLaren-Renault	1:05.271			14
17	11	(Mexico) Sergio Pérez	Force India-Mercedes	1:05.279			15
18	35	(Russia) Sergey Sirotkin	Williams-Mercedes	1:05.322			16
19	28	(New Zealand) Brendon Hartley	Scuderia Toro Rosso-Honda	1:05.366			19^{d}
20	9	(Sweden) Marcus Ericsson	Sauber-Ferrari	1:05.479			18
107% time: 1:08.565

Notes

- ^a – Sebastian Vettel received a three-place grid penalty for impeding Carlos Sainz Jr. in Q2.
- ^b – Charles Leclerc received a five-place grid penalty for an unscheduled gearbox change.
- ^c – Fernando Alonso required to start from the pit lane for changing to a new specification of front wing assembly and a new MGU-K.
- ^d – Brendon Hartley received a 35-place grid penalty for exceeding his quota of power unit components.

=== Race ===
Pos.	No.	Driver	Constructor	Laps	Time/Retired	Grid	Points
1	33	(Netherlands) Max Verstappen	Red Bull Racing-TAG Heuer	71	1:21:56.024	4	25
2	7	(Finland) Kimi Räikkönen	Ferrari	71	+1.504	3	18
3	5	(Germany) Sebastian Vettel	Ferrari	71	+3.181	6	15
4	8	(France) Romain Grosjean	Haas-Ferrari	70	+1 lap	5	12
5	20	(Denmark) Kevin Magnussen	Haas-Ferrari	70	+1 lap	8	10
6	31	(France) Esteban Ocon	Force India-Mercedes	70	+1 lap	11	8
7	11	(Mexico) Sergio Pérez	Force India-Mercedes	70	+1 lap	15	6
8	14	(Spain) Fernando Alonso	McLaren-Renault	70	+1 lap	PL	4
9	16	(Monaco) Charles Leclerc	Sauber-Ferrari	70	+1 lap	17	2
10	9	(Sweden) Marcus Ericsson	Sauber-Ferrari	70	+1 lap	18	1
11	10	(France) Pierre Gasly	Scuderia Toro Rosso-Honda	70	+1 lap	12	
12	55	(Spain) Carlos Sainz Jr.	Renault	70	+1 lap	9	
13	35	(Russia) Sergey Sirotkin	Williams-Mercedes	69	+2 laps	16	
14	18	(Canada) Lance Stroll	Williams-Mercedes	69	+2 laps^{1}	13	
15^{2}	2	(Belgium) Stoffel Vandoorne	McLaren-Renault	65	Collision damage	14	
Ret	44	(United Kingdom) Lewis Hamilton	Mercedes	62	Fuel pressure	2	
Ret	28	(New Zealand) Brendon Hartley	Scuderia Toro Rosso-Honda	54	Hydraulics	19	
Ret	3	(Australia) Daniel Ricciardo	Red Bull Racing-TAG Heuer	53	Exhaust	7	
Ret	77	(Finland) Valtteri Bottas	Mercedes	13	Hydraulics	1	
Ret	27	(Germany) Nico Hülkenberg	Renault	11	Engine	10	

Notes

- ^1 – Lance Stroll originally finished 13th, but had 10 seconds added to his race time for ignoring blue flags.
- ^2 – Stoffel Vandoorne retired from the race, but was classified as he completed more than 90% of the race distance.

== Championship standings after the race ==
Drivers' Championship standings

	Pos.	Driver	Points
1	1	(Germany) Sebastian Vettel	146
1	2	(United Kingdom) Lewis Hamilton	145
2	3	(Finland) Kimi Räikkönen	101
1	4	(Australia) Daniel Ricciardo	96
1	5	(Netherlands) Max Verstappen	93

Constructors' Championship standings

	Pos.	Constructor	Points
1	1	(Italy) Ferrari	247
1	2	(Germany) Mercedes	237
	3	(Austria) Red Bull Racing-TAG Heuer	189
	4	(France) Renault	62
1	5	(United States) Haas-Ferrari	49

- Note: Only the top five positions are included for both sets of standings.

== See also ==
- 2018 Spielberg Formula 2 round
- 2018 Spielberg GP3 Series round

Previous race: 2018 French Grand Prix	FIA Formula One World Championship; 2018 season	Next race: 2018 British Grand Prix
Previous race: 2017 Austrian Grand Prix	Austrian Grand Prix	Next race: 2019 Austrian Grand Prix
