= Ralph Boschung =

Swiss racing driver (born 1997)

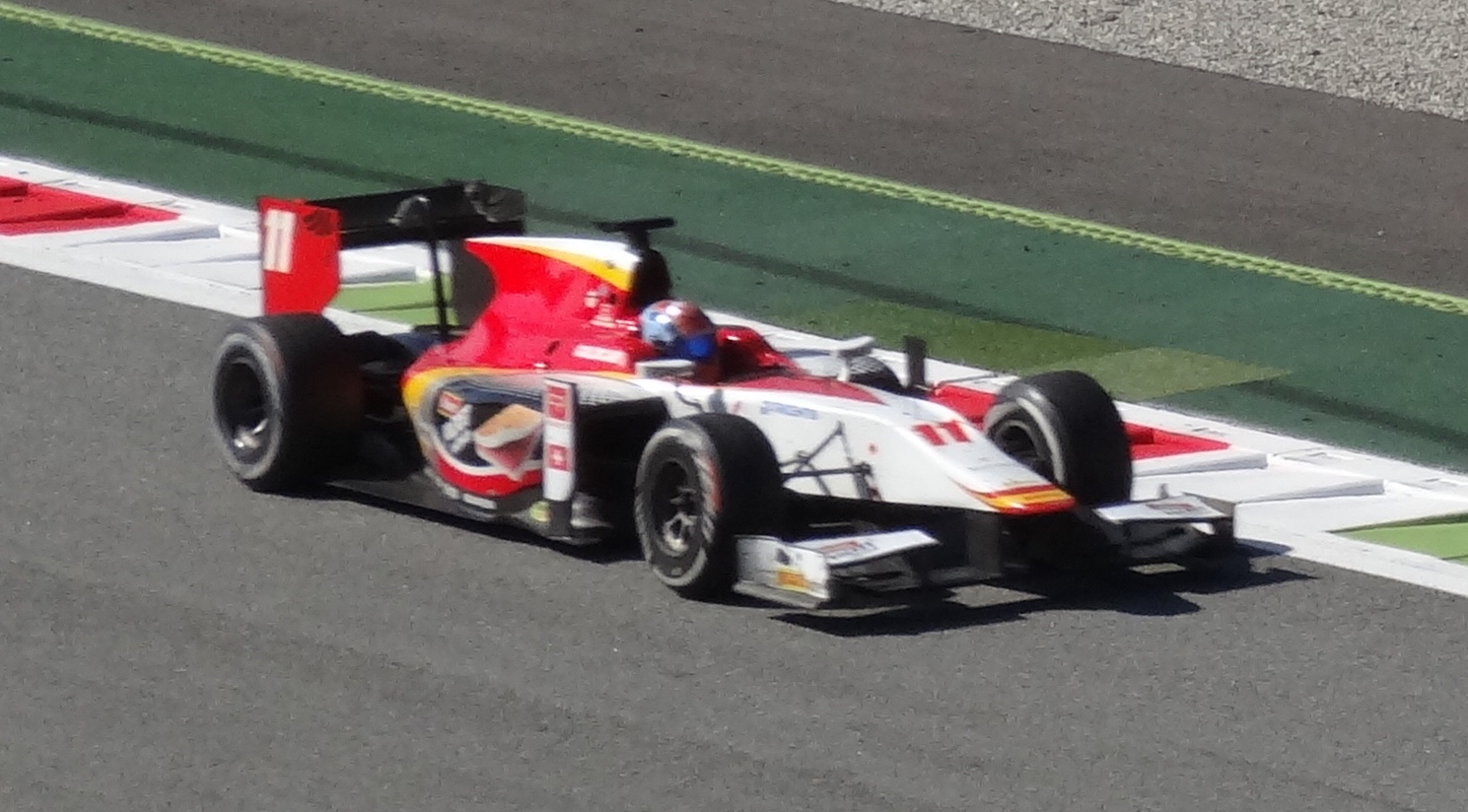
- Boschung in 2017
- Nationality: (Switzerland) Swiss
- Born: 23 September 1997 (age 29) Monthey, Switzerland

FIA Formula 2 Championship career
- Debut season: 2017
- Categorisation: FIA Silver (until 2023); FIA Gold (2024–)
- Car number: 25
- Former teams: Trident, MP Motorsport, Campos Racing
- Starts: 120 (130 entries)
- Wins: 1
- Podiums: 6
- Poles: 1
- Fastest laps: 2
- Best finish: 10th in 2021

Previous series
- 2017–23 2015–16 2013–14 2012: FIA Formula 2 Championship; GP3 Series; ADAC Formel Masters; Formula BMW

Ralph Boschung (German pronunciation: [ʁalf ˈboʃʊŋ]; born 23 September 1997) is a Swiss racing driver who most recently competed in the 2023 FIA Formula 2 Championship for Campos Racing. He is a race winner in the GP3 Series and has previously competed in Formula 2 from 2017 to 2023, for Campos, MP Motorsport and Trident.

== Career ==
=== Formula BMW Talent Cup ===
In 2012, Boschung made his debut in open-wheel racing, competing in the Formula BMW Talent Cup. He ended the season fifth, five points behind champion Marvin Dienst, after winning the first race and scoring a fourth place in the second.

=== ADAC Formel Masters ===
==== 2013 ====
In 2013, Boschung competed in ADAC Formel Masters with Team KUG Motorsport and ended the season seventh, having inherited a win at the Slovakiaring after the original race winner and that year's champion, Alessio Picariello, was given a penalty. He also took six podium finishes.

==== 2014 ====
The following year, Boschung moved to Lotus, where he would partner Dennis Marschall and Joel Eriksson. He started the season with a podium at the Oschersleben, finishing third. Boschung even had a run of finishing on the podium at all three races at the Red Bull Ring. Altogether, Boschung achieved eight podium finishes throughout the season but did not manage a single win. Boschung once again ended the season seventh in the standings, narrowly behind his teammates.

=== GP3 Series ===
==== 2015 ====
In 2015, Boschung debuted in the GP3 Series with Jenzer Motorsport, partnering Pål Varhaug and fellow Swiss Mathéo Tuscher. Having been taken out by a rival in the opening round, Boschung scored his first points in the second round at the Red Bull Ring. Following that, Boschung scored the only podium of his season when he finished third in the round at Silverstone after starting from pole position. He went on to have a five-race long points scoring streak, and after achieving his last point of the campaign at the Bahrain International Circuit, he ended his season eleventh in the championship, achieving 28 points and also beating both his teammates Varhaug and Tuscher.

==== 2016 ====
For the 2016 season, Boschung switched to Koiranen GP, this time teaming up with Matt Parry and Matevos Isaakyan. His season began with a point in Barcelona, after achieving his best qualifying so far in ninth. He then followed that up with his first win in cars since 2013 by winning the sprint race at the Red Bull Ring, where he managed to stay in front of the chasing pack in rainy conditions. Boschung scored further points in the feature races at Silverstone and Hungaroring in the following two events. It saw him up in fifth place in the championship. However, after the pair of races at the Hockenheimring, where the Swiss driver didn't score any points, he was replaced for the round at Spa-Francorchamps by Niko Kari, with the team citing financial reasons. He returned to racing in Monza, finishing outside the points in 18th and ninth. However, Boschung was forced to leave the team for good after that round, missing the final two rounds. He ended up eleventh in the standings, helping Koiranen to finish 5th in the team championship.

=== FIA Formula 2 Championship ===
==== 2017 ====
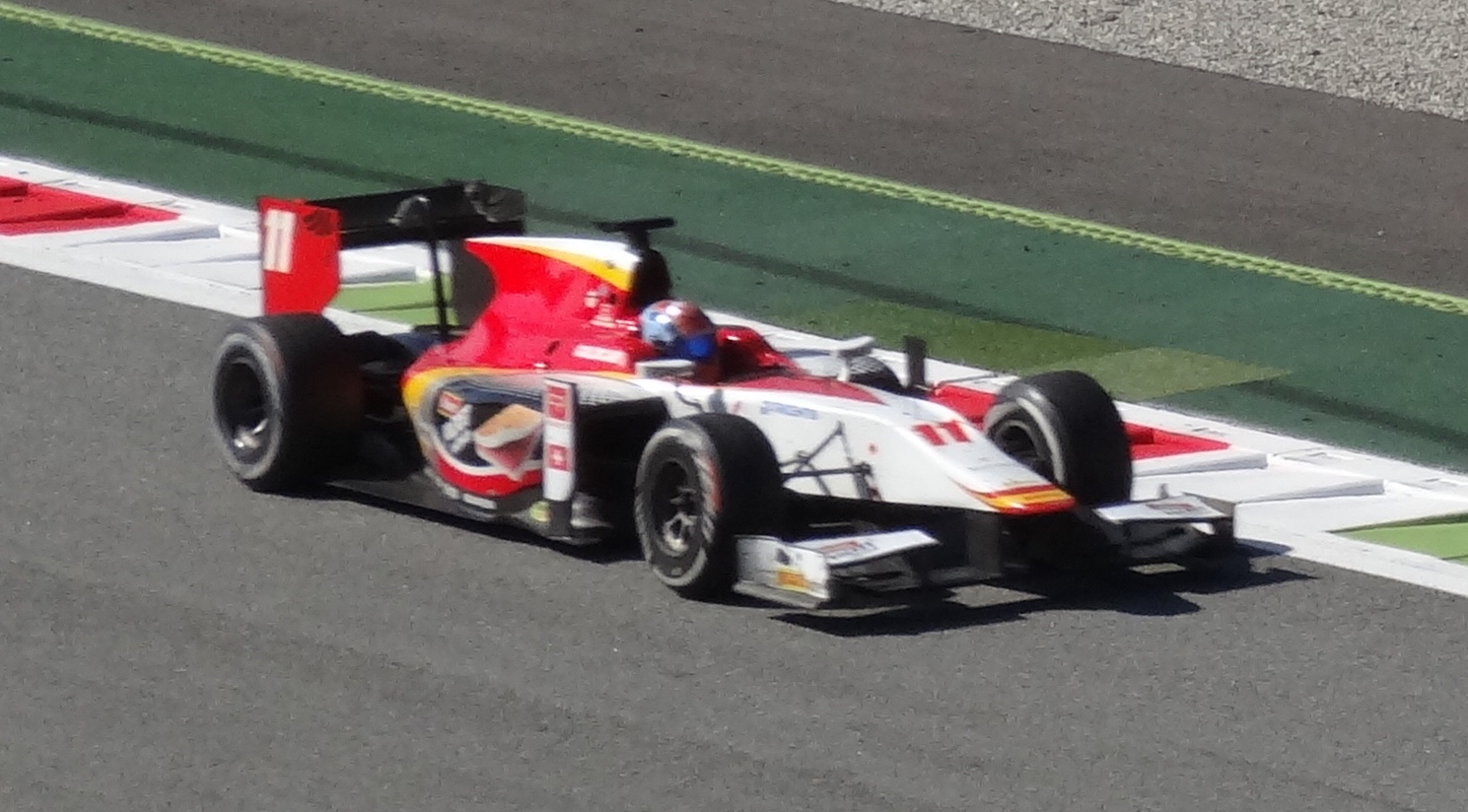
Boschung racing at the 2017 Monza Formula 2 round

In March 2017, Boschung signed for Campos Racing to compete in the inaugural FIA Formula 2 Championship, initially partnering Stefano Coletti and later Roberto Merhi, Robert Vișoiu and Álex Palou. Boschung finished out of the points during the first three rounds of the season, netting a highest finish of 12th thrice. Boschung finally took his first Formula 2 points at the Baku round, finishing eighth in the feature race. This gave him pole for the sprint. Boschung lost the lead on the first lap, before a DRS failure saw him slowly tumble down the rankings. He finished ninth before a disqualification from Jordan King saw him promoted to eighth, adding a point to his tally. Boschung picked his highest finish of the season with seventh in the feature race at the Red Bull Ring. It would also prove to be his final points finish of the season. Lining up second for the sprint, Boschung stalled on the grid and was hit from behind. He carried on with damage but finally retired from good on lap 16. Boschung was set for a top-three qualifying finish at the Hungaroring, but problems left him 14th on the grid. He was set to claim another points finish, running in ninth during the feature race, but he was forced off track by Jordan King and lost five places. He recovered to eleventh. He had no luck in the sprint race; suffering a clutch issue at the start and finishing 16th. Boschung challenged for points at Spa-Francorchamps and Monza, but his efforts went unrewarded. Boschung parted ways with Campos before the final round at Yas Marina and was replaced by that year's FIA Formula 3 European champion Lando Norris. Overall, Boschung scored 11 points and finished 19th in the championship, scoring more points than all his teammates combined.

At the end of the year, Boschung drove in a Super Formula test at the Suzuka Circuit.

==== 2018 ====
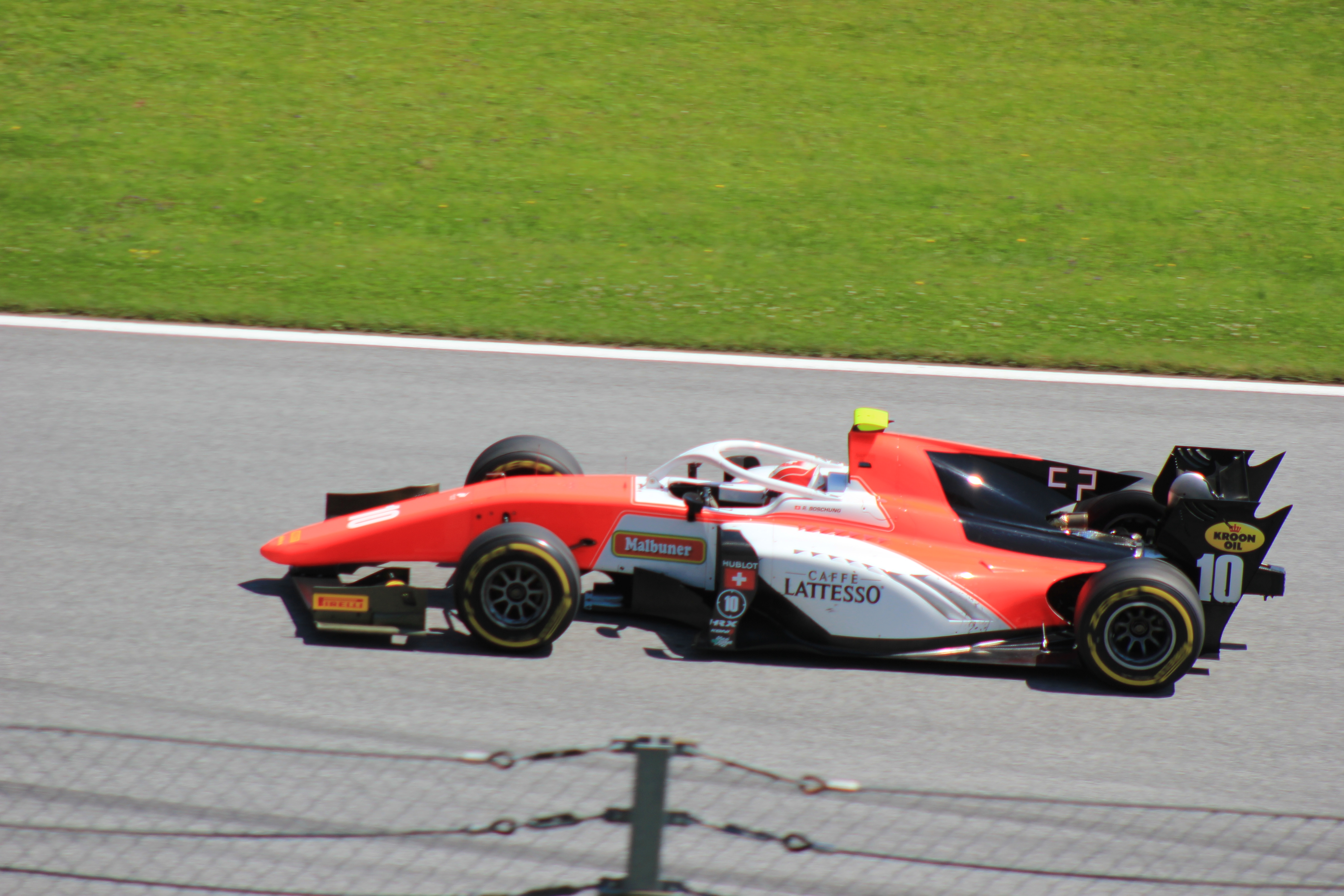
Boschung with MP Motorsport in 2018

After appearing at the 2017 post-season test with MP Motorsport, Boschung signed with the team for the 2018 season alongside Roberto Merhi and later Dorian Boccolacci. Boschung had a great start to the season, scoring points in the first race of the season in Bahrain. He then followed it up with seventh in the sprint race, thanks to a lightning start. Boschung had another double points finish in Baku, qualifying in the top-ten. He progressed to seventh in the feature race, and lined second for the sprint race. He dropped to ninth due to excessive tyre wear, but was upgraded to eighth after Sérgio Sette Câmara was disqualified. Along with Lando Norris, Boschung was one of two drivers to score points in the first two rounds. His opening performance proved to be a false dawn. From Spain to France, Boschung suffered five consecutive retirements ranging from racing incidents to car issues. His next points finish would come at the seventh round at Silverstone. He drove clean races to finish ninth and eighth in the feature and sprint races respectively. Boschung had point-less rounds in Budapest and Spa-Francorchamps compounded with more retirements. During the Monza round Boschung took eighth in the feature race having started 18th. He started on pole for the sprint and suffered a poor start, before contact with Sean Gelael ended Boschung's race on lap 5. Boschung once again failed to finish the season after leaving MP Motorsport due to budgetary reasons. He was replaced by Niko Kari for the rounds at Sochi and Abu Dhabi. Overall, Boschung scored 17 points and placed 18th in the championship, also being outscored by teammate Merhi.

==== 2019 ====
Boschung raced for Trident in 2019 alongside Giuliano Alesi. For the first round in Bahrain, Boschung qualified ninth. However in the feature race electronic issues saw him passed by Guanyu Zhou and Mick Schumacher late in the race, and he finished eleventh just outside the points. He finished 14th in the sprint race, whilst suffering from tyre degradation. At the second round in Baku, despite qualifying in the top-ten once more, he was hit by his teammate Alesi and fell to the back on the opening lap of the feature race. He finished 12th, albeit second-last place. He had no luck in the sprint, being hit by Tatiana Calderon saw his weekend to a close. Boschung maintained his top-ten qualifying form at Barcelona in eighth before being promoted to seventh for the feature race. He ran on the alternate strategy starting on the hards, and finished tenth, scoring his and Trident's first points finish of the year. In the sprint race, Boschung matched his feature race result. In Monaco, Boschung once again scored points in the feature race, finishing ninth having started 14th. In the sprint race, Boschung improved to seventh on the first lap and was set for more points until an engine problem on the tenth lap saw him out of the race. Boschung had a weekend to forget in France, being eliminated in the start chaos in the feature race and finishing 15th in the sprint. Once again, his season was again plagued by funding problems, and he was replaced with Ryan Tveter and Dorian Boccolacci for the rounds in Austria and Britain respectively. Boschung returned to Trident at the Hungaroring round, where he retired with an engine failure in the feature race and finished 18th in the sprint. At the Spa-Francorchamps feature race, Boschung was involved in an accident which resulted in the death of Anthoine Hubert and serious injuries for Juan Manuel Correa. The car of teammate Alesi, who was also involved in the accident, was impounded by the Belgian authorities and the team was forced to field only one car for the next round at Monza. Boschung was stood down to allow Alesi to compete. Boschung returned to racing in Sochi, finishing 14th and 12th in the feature and sprint races respectively. Boschung again lost his seat prior to the final round in Abu Dhabi and was replaced by Christian Lundgaard. Trident finished last in the teams' championship, with Boschung scoring three points and placing 19th in the drivers' championship.

Boschung tested for MP Motorsport during the 2019 post-season testing, the team he raced during the 2018 championship.

==== 2020 ====
Trident fielded a new driver lineup for the 2020 season and Boschung left the series. However, in December 2020 it was announced that Boschung would return to Campos Racing to compete in the 2021 Formula 2 Championship. This return was brought forward to the final round of 2020 by a series of driver moves caused by Mercedes Formula One driver Lewis Hamilton's positive coronavirus test. Hamilton was replaced for the Formula One Sakhir Grand Prix by Williams driver George Russell, who was in turn replaced by Campos Formula 2 driver Jack Aitken, allowing Boschung to return to Formula 2 at the second Bahrain round alongside Guilherme Samaia. He finished 14th in the feature race and retired in the sprint, to rank 25th overall.

==== 2021 ====
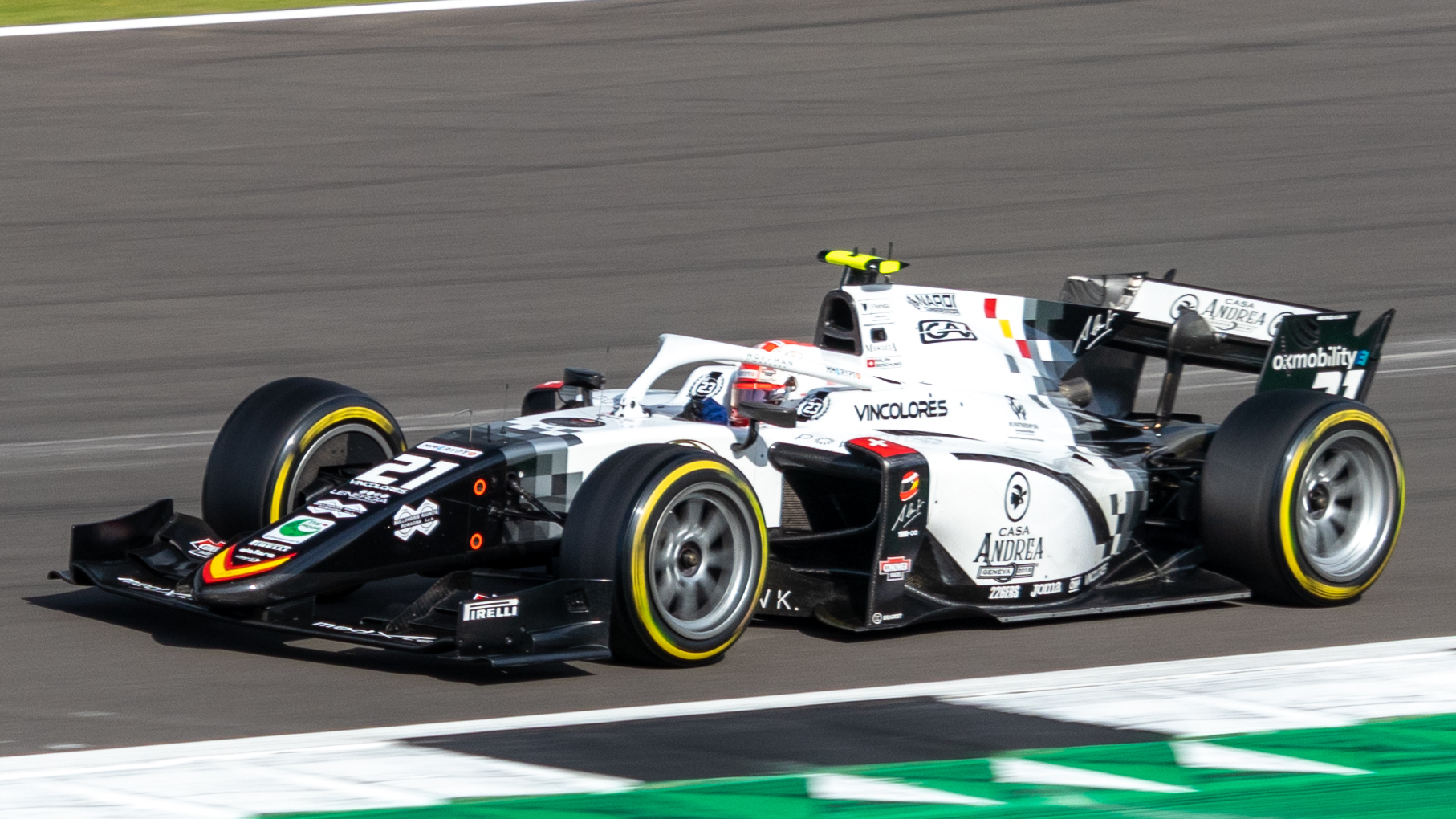
Boschung at Silverstone in 2021

For the start of the 2021 season, Boschung was partnered by the 2020 Formula Regional European champion Gianluca Petecof. Boschung qualified 12th for the Bahrain opening round. The first race ended in disappointment for him, as he tagged the back of Marcus Armstrong and retired. In the second sprint, Boschung finished 17th and last while setting the fastest lap. He finished 15th in the feature race, leaving the weekend without a single point. At the second round of the year in Monaco, Boschung qualified sixth, his best qualifying up till that point. In Sprint Race 1, Boschung finished an excellent fourth, after Christian Lundgaard retired. fifth and sixth places respectively. In Sprint Race 2, Boschung finished fifth and in the feature race finished sixth after nearly passing Guanyu Zhou for fifth in the end. This marked his best Formula 2 race result and earnt him 22 points over the race weekend, more than he had scored in any whole Formula 2 season beforehand.

The following round in Baku, Boschung was partnered by Matteo Nannini. In the first sprint, Boschung lined up fourth, having qualified seventh. He was passed by Marcus Armstrong at the start and later Dan Ticktum and Théo Pourchaire. But on the penultimate lap, Boschung re-overtook Armstrong to classify sixth. He had a difficult second sprint, as he was hit from Pourchaire behind, damaging his suspension. Boschung stayed clear of chaos in the feature race to come home in fifth, his best ever feature race result thus far. Boschung would have a difficult weekend in Silverstone. A red flag with two minutes remaining in qualifying consigned Boschung to a low 15th on the grid. Boschung had no pace in the races, he finished 14th in the first sprint. In the second sprint, Boschung spun on the first lap and collided with Alessio Deledda, concluding both of their races. Boschung finished 14th again in the feature race.

Boschung matched his sixth place Monaco qualifying in Monza. Additionally, David Beckmann was his new teammate for this and the next round. Boschung was running well in the opening laps but sustained front wing damage in an incident with Ticktum and was forced to pit. Boschung finished in 14th, a lap behind the leader. Boschung's second sprint was not much better, he progressed through the field but missed out on points in ninth by less than a second. Boschung had a luckless feature race, he had a slow pit stop and two laps later the safety car was called out and most of the field pitted. He soon was back in the top-ten, but soon fell out of it as drivers on fresher tyres passed him. He ended the race in 15th, to cap off a frustrating weekend. The Swiss driver qualified fifth in Sochi, improving his personal best in qualifying. He started the only sprint in sixth maintaining his position until the end. Boschung had a brilliant start in the feature race, jumping Zhou and Jehan Daruvala into third. He was set for his maiden F2 podium until lap 23, where he slid wide at turn 14 and lost third to Daruvala. He had further woes as with just three laps to go, a puncture forced him to retire.

In November 2021, LTO Network and Boschung announced partnership to lead motorsports into the Metaverse Using NFT2.0 Technology. LTO network also sponsored a few races for Boschung.

Boschung qualified seventh in Jeddah. In the first sprint race, Boschung moved up a position to third at the start, passing Jüri Vips. But at the halfway mark of the race, Vips passed him back and Boschung started to tumble down the order, citing brake issues, and eventually finished 15th. In the second sprint, Boschung improved to ninth but could not steal points. His breakthrough moment of the weekend would be the feature Race where he achieved his first podium, finishing third after the race was reduced to five laps. This occurred due to two accidents, one involving Enzo Fittipaldi and Pourchaire, another involving his new teammate Olli Caldwell and Guilherme Samaia. At the Yas Marina season finale, Boschung equalled his best qualifying of fifth. He crossed the finish line ninth in sprint race 1, which gave him a front row start for sprint race 2. He was overtaken by Guanyu Zhou on lap 3 but was back in second place on lap 11 when Armstrong retired. Just a lap later, Robert Shwartzman passed him but nevertheless capped off another podium in third. Boschung finished the feature race in ninth place after managing to defend his position during the final few laps. Overall, Boschung was classified tenth in the standings and Campos ranked seventh.

==== 2022 ====
In November 2021, Campos announced that Boschung would be remaining with the team for the 2022 campaign, partnering new Alpine junior Olli Caldwell.

For the first round in Bahrain, Boschung qualified fifth, his third top-five in qualifying overall. He made a superb start in the sprint race as he was up to second on the first lap, having started sixth. However, he eventually finished fourth after Jehan Daruvala and Liam Lawson passed him, the latter having overtaken him on the third last lap. He made another epic start in the feature race, also improving to second place. He drove a controlled drive and stayed out of trouble to finish fourth once more. Boschung improved his qualifying best to fourth in Jeddah. Despite that, it would become unrewarded. Boschung finished eighth in the sprint race but was given a 20-second time penalty after being out of position during the starting grid, demoting all the way to 15th. In the feature race, a set-up change saw Boschung unable to maximise his opportunity and lacked pace to finished 14th.

During the third round in Imola, Boschung topped practice for the first time. He then used his talent to again qualify fourth. He was running sixth in the sprint race until lap 9 when Felipe Drugovich overtook him, and he soon retired from the race with a fuel pump issue a lap later. He was able to turn his fortunes in the feature race, making another lightning getaway to move into second on the opening lap behind Roy Nissany. Théo Pourchaire overtook him after the pit stops, and after Nissany crashed out, Boschung was in a net second place. That was until, Enzo Fittipaldi passed him and he fell to third but still managed to add another podium to his tally. In the Barcelona round, Boschung ran in practice but unfortunately, he was forced to sit out the whole weekend with neck pain. Just a week later, Boschung raced in Monaco, qualifying tenth following penalties and was set to start on reverse pole. However his neck issues continued to persist and he once again had to pull out. He returned to racing in Baku, despite continuing to suffer from neck pain. He qualified 18th, and in the sprint race ran as high as ninth before he clashed with Calan Williams. He was deemed guilty, and a three-place grid drop saw Boschung line up 21st for the feature race. Boschung mastered tyre wear as he ran the soft tyre for more than half of the race, and finished ninth.

In Silverstone, Boschung qualified 17th. However, neck pain continued to persist and he was forced to withdraw for the rest of the weekend. Due to ongoing neck injury, Boschung decided that he would take an indefinite number of races off to allow his injury to recover. He was replaced by Roberto Merhi, who last drove with Campos in 2018.

Following three rounds absent, Boschung made his F2 return at Spa-Francorchamps, despite still struggling with neck pain. He topped practice and qualified tenth for the feature race. Boschung took advantage of reverse grid pole to achieve his second podium of the season with third place in Saturday's sprint race. He capped off his weekend with a 14th place in the feature race. In Zandvoort Boschung had an uneventful weekend, a poor qualifying result only bringing him 17th and 15th places in the sprint and feature races respectively.

Boschung had an unfortunate showing in Monza, he retired in the sprint race was involved in an incident with Clément Novalak which bent his steering after starting 13th. Boschung was penalised for the incident and was demoted three place for the feature race. In the feature race, Boschung was forced off-track and re-joined in an unsafe manner, and later crashed into the barriers after colliding with Pourchaire. Boschung was then issued another three-place grid drop for the next race. Boschung again failed to score points in the Yas Marina round. He was classified 15th in the standings with 40 points.

==== 2023 ====
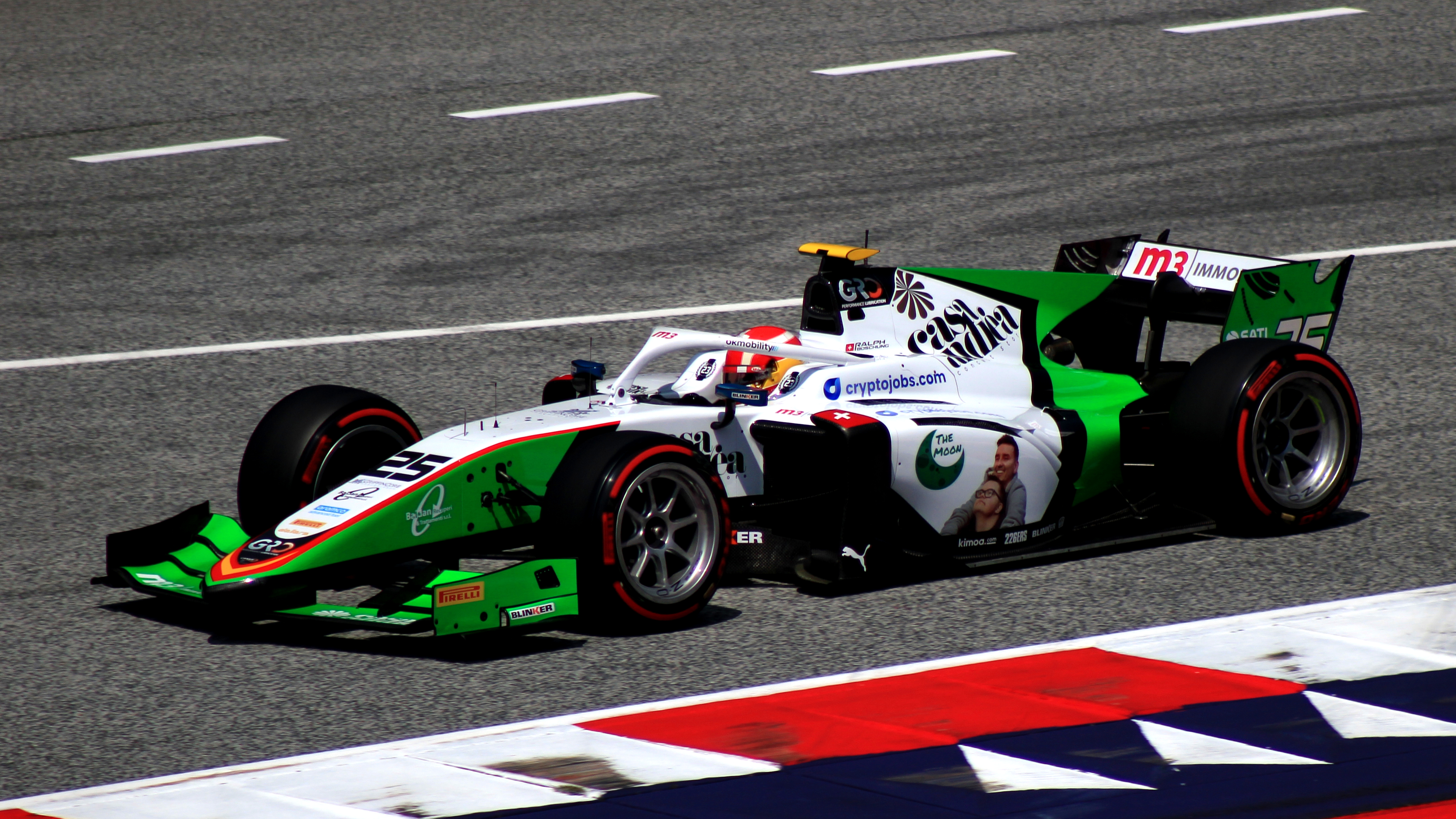
Boschung driving the Dallara F2 2018 during the 2023 Spielberg Formula 2 round.

Boschung remained with Campos Racing for a third successive season in 2023, this time being joined by Kush Maini. The season was Boschung's last F2 season, having competed in the championship for five years. The start of the season brought with it success unseen before, as Boschung took the lead of the sprint race from reverse grid pole in Bahrain, maintaining his position to take his maiden victory in Formula 2 on his 96th race start. On Sunday, he once again finished on the podium, taking second after capitalising on a chaotic opening lap. Talking about his weekend, Boschung described his car as "incredible", saying that the team's baseline race pace was better than it had been during the previous season.

In Jeddah, Boschung qualified in ninth, and took the standings lead after finishing in a strong fourth place during the sprint race. Since then, Boschung failed to score points for the next eight rounds. In Spa-Francorchamps, Boschung returned to the top-ten in qualifying with seventh, having taken advantage of unpredictable rainy conditions. From there, it would yield a double points finish, ending the races in eighth and tenth place. His last points finish came in the Monza feature race, coming home ninth in an incident-marred race. He finished 16th in the standings, with 37 points.

Boschung was the only driver to have contested in every season of the modern era in the FIA Formula 2 Championship up to that point.

== Retirement ==
On 6 February 2024, Ralph Boschung on X announced his retirement from racing.

== Return to motorsport ==
On 16 February 2026, Audi Formula 1 Team announced Boschung as one of their development drivers. He had been assisting the team in developing the Audi R26 via simulator work and other feedback.

== Karting record ==
=== Karting career summary ===
| Season | Series | Position |
|---|---|---|
| 2008 | Swiss Romand Championship — Mini | 4th |
| 2011 | Grand Prix Open Karting — KF3 | 29th |
| 2011 | Bridgestone Cup European Final — KF3 | 34th |

== Racing record ==
=== Racing career summary ===
| Season | Series | Team | Races | Wins | Poles | F/Laps | Podiums | Points | Position |
|---|---|---|---|---|---|---|---|---|---|
| 2012 | Formula BMW Talent Cup | N/A | 3 | 1 | 0 | 0 | 1 | 37 | 5th |
| 2013 | ADAC Formel Masters | Team KUG Motorsport | 24 | 1 | 0 | 1 | 6 | 122 | 7th |
| 2014 | ADAC Formel Masters | Lotus | 24 | 0 | 0 | 1 | 8 | 160 | 7th |
| 2015 | GP3 Series | Jenzer Motorsport | 18 | 0 | 0 | 0 | 1 | 28 | 11th |
| 2016 | GP3 Series | Koiranen GP | 12 | 1 | 0 | 1 | 1 | 48 | 11th |
| 2017 | FIA Formula 2 Championship | Campos Racing | 20 | 0 | 0 | 0 | 0 | 11 | 19th |
| 2018 | FIA Formula 2 Championship | MP Motorsport | 20 | 0 | 0 | 0 | 0 | 17 | 18th |
| 2019 | FIA Formula 2 Championship | Trident | 14 | 0 | 0 | 0 | 0 | 3 | 19th |
| 2020 | FIA Formula 2 Championship | Campos Racing | 2 | 0 | 0 | 0 | 0 | 0 | 25th |
| 2021 | FIA Formula 2 Championship | Campos Racing | 23 | 0 | 0 | 1 | 2 | 59.5 | 10th |
| 2022 | FIA Formula 2 Championship | Campos Racing | 16 | 0 | 0 | 0 | 2 | 40 | 15th |
| 2023 | FIA Formula 2 Championship | Campos Racing | 25 | 1 | 0 | 0 | 2 | 37 | 16th |
| 2024 | Formula One | Stake F1 Team Kick Sauber | Simulator driver | | | | | | |
| 2025 | Formula One | Stake F1 Team Kick Sauber | Simulator driver | | | | | | |
| 2026 | Formula One | Audi Revolut F1 Team | Development driver | | | | | | |

* Season still in progress.

=== Complete ADAC Formel Masters results ===
(key) (Races in bold indicate pole position) (Races in italics indicate fastest lap)

| Year | Team | 1 | 2 | 3 | 4 | 5 | 6 | 7 | 8 | 9 | 10 | 11 | 12 | 13 | 14 | 15 | 16 | 17 | 18 | 19 | 20 | 21 | 22 | 23 | 24 | DC | Points |
|---|---|---|---|---|---|---|---|---|---|---|---|---|---|---|---|---|---|---|---|---|---|---|---|---|---|---|---|
| 2013 | Team KUG Motorsport | OSC; 1; 10 | OSC; 2; 11 | OSC; 3; 8 | SPA; 1; 6 | SPA; 2; 13 | SPA; 3; 3 | SAC; 1 Ret | SAC; 2 Ret | SAC; 3; 14 | NÜR; 1; 4 | NÜR; 2; 3 | NÜR; 3; 7 | RBR; 1 Ret | RBR; 2 Ret | RBR; 3; 8 | LAU; 1; 6 | LAU; 2; 5 | LAU; 3; 3 | SVK; 1; 3 | SVK; 2; 4 | SVK; 3; 1 | HOC; 1; 3 | HOC; 2 Ret | HOC; 3; 5 | 7th | 122 |
| 2014 | Lotus | OSC; 1 Ret | OSC; 2; 5 | OSC; 3; 3 | ZAN; 1; 4 | ZAN; 2; 3 | ZAN; 3 Ret | LAU; 1; 5 | LAU; 2 Ret | LAU; 3; 3 | RBR; 1; 2 | RBR; 2; 3 | RBR; 3; 3 | SVK; 1; 6 | SVK; 2; 3 | SVK; 3; 12 | NÜR; 1; 15 | NÜR; 2; 2 | NÜR; 3; 13 | SAC; 1; 8 | SAC; 2; 11 | SAC; 3; 8 | HOC; 1; 6 | HOC; 2; 13 | HOC; 3 Ret | 7th | 160 |

=== Complete GP3 Series results ===
(key) (Races in bold indicate pole position) (Races in italics indicate fastest lap)

| Year | Entrant | 1 | 2 | 3 | 4 | 5 | 6 | 7 | 8 | 9 | 10 | 11 | 12 | 13 | 14 | 15 | 16 | 17 | 18 | Pos | Points |
|---|---|---|---|---|---|---|---|---|---|---|---|---|---|---|---|---|---|---|---|---|---|
| 2015 | Jenzer Motorsport | CAT; FEA; Ret | CAT; SPR; 14 | RBR; FEA; 8 | RBR; SPR; 8 | SIL; FEA; 8 | SIL; SPR; 3 | HUN; FEA; 13 | HUN; SPR; 8 | SPA; FEA; 9 | SPA; SPR; 8 | MNZ; FEA; 9 | MNZ; SPR; 7 | SOC; FEA; 11 | SOC; SPR; DNS | BHR; FEA; 10 | BHR; SPR; 9 | YMC; FEA; 12 | YMC; SPR; 11 | 11th | 28 |
| 2016 | Koiranen GP | CAT; FEA; 10 | CAT; SPR; 10 | RBR; FEA; 4 | RBR; SPR; 1 | SIL; FEA; 6 | SIL; SPR; 12 | HUN; FEA; 5 | HUN; SPR; 22 | HOC; FEA; 15 | HOC; SPR; Ret | SPA; FEA | SPA; SPR | MNZ; FEA; 18 | MNZ; SPR; 9 | SEP; FEA | SEP; SPR | YMC; FEA | YMC; SPR | 11th | 48 |

=== Complete FIA Formula 2 Championship results ===
(key) (Races in bold indicate pole position) (Races in italics indicate points for the fastest lap of top ten finishers)

| Year | Entrant | 1 | 2 | 3 | 4 | 5 | 6 | 7 | 8 | 9 | 10 | 11 | 12 | 13 | 14 | 15 | 16 | 17 | 18 | 19 | 20 | 21 | 22 | 23 | 24 | 25 | 26 | 27 | 28 | DC | Points |
|---|---|---|---|---|---|---|---|---|---|---|---|---|---|---|---|---|---|---|---|---|---|---|---|---|---|---|---|---|---|---|---|
| 2017 | Campos Racing | BHR; FEA; 12 | BHR; SPR; Ret | CAT; FEA; 12 | CAT; SPR; 17 | MON; FEA; 12 | MON; SPR; Ret | BAK; FEA; 8 | BAK; SPR; 8 | RBR; FEA; 7 | RBR; SPR; Ret | SIL; FEA; 11 | SIL; SPR; Ret | HUN; FEA; 11 | HUN; SPR; 16 | SPA; FEA; 13 | SPA; SPR; 13 | MNZ; FEA; 15 | MNZ; SPR; 13 | JER; FEA; Ret | JER; SPR; 19† | YMC; FEA | YMC; SPR | | | | | | | 19th | 11 |
| 2018 | MP Motorsport | BHR; FEA; 10 | BHR; SPR; 7 | BAK; FEA; 7 | BAK; SPR; 8 | CAT; FEA; Ret | CAT; SPR; Ret | MON; FEA; Ret | MON; SPR; Ret | LEC; FEA; Ret | LEC; SPR; 16 | RBR; FEA; Ret | RBR; SPR; 15 | SIL; FEA; 9 | SIL; SPR; 8 | HUN; FEA; 18 | HUN; SPR; Ret | SPA; FEA; Ret | SPA; SPR; 12 | MNZ; FEA; 8 | MNZ; SPR; Ret | SOC; FEA | SOC; SPR | YMC; FEA | YMC; SPR | | | | | 18th | 17 |
| 2019 | Trident | BHR; FEA; 11 | BHR; SPR; 14 | BAK; FEA; 12 | BAK; SPR; Ret | CAT; FEA; 10 | CAT; SPR; 10 | MON; FEA; 9 | MON; SPR; Ret | LEC; FEA; Ret | LEC; SPR; 15 | RBR; FEA | RBR; SPR | SIL; FEA | SIL; SPR | HUN; FEA; 18† | HUN; SPR; 18 | SPA; FEA; C | SPA; SPR; C | MNZ; FEA | MNZ; SPR | SOC; FEA; 14 | SOC; SPR; 12 | YMC; FEA | YMC; SPR | | | | | 19th | 3 |
| 2020 | Campos Racing | RBR; FEA | RBR; SPR | RBR; FEA | RBR; SPR | HUN; FEA | HUN; SPR | SIL; FEA | SIL; SPR | SIL; FEA | SIL; SPR | CAT; FEA | CAT; SPR | SPA; FEA | SPA; SPR | MNZ; FEA | MNZ; SPR | MUG; FEA | MUG; SPR | SOC; FEA | SOC; SPR | BHR; FEA | BHR; SPR | BHR; FEA; 14 | BHR; SPR; Ret | | | | | 25th | 0 |
| 2021 | Campos Racing | BHR; SP1; Ret | BHR; SP2; 17 | BHR; FEA; 15 | MCO; SP1; 4 | MCO; SP2; 5 | MCO; FEA; 6 | BAK; SP1; 6 | BAK; SP2; Ret | BAK; FEA; 5 | SIL; SP1; 14 | SIL; SP2; Ret | SIL; FEA; 14 | MNZ; SP1; 14 | MNZ; SP2; 9 | MNZ; FEA; 14 | SOC; SP1; 6 | SOC; SP2; C | SOC; FEA; 19† | JED; SP1; 15 | JED; SP2; 9 | JED; FEA; 3‡ | YMC; SP1; 9 | YMC; SP2; 3 | YMC; FEA; 9 | | | | | 10th | 59.5 |
| 2022 | Campos Racing | BHR; SPR; 4 | BHR; FEA; 4 | JED; SPR; 15 | JED; FEA; 15 | IMO; SPR; Ret | IMO; FEA; 3 | CAT; SPR; WD | CAT; FEA; WD | MCO; SPR; WD | MCO; FEA; WD | BAK; SPR; 15† | BAK; FEA; 9 | SIL; SPR; WD | SIL; FEA; WD | RBR; SPR | RBR; FEA | LEC; SPR | LEC; FEA | HUN; SPR | HUN; FEA | SPA; SPR; 3 | SPA; FEA; 14 | ZAN; SPR; 17 | ZAN; FEA; 17 | MNZ; SPR; Ret | MNZ; FEA; Ret | YMC; SPR; 17 | YMC; FEA; Ret | 15th | 40 |
| 2023 | Campos Racing | BHR; SPR; 1 | BHR; FEA; 2 | JED; SPR; 4 | JED; FEA; 19 | MEL; SPR; DNS | MEL; FEA; 16 | BAK; SPR; Ret | BAK; FEA; 20 | MCO; SPR; Ret | MCO; FEA; Ret | CAT; SPR; 16 | CAT; FEA; 15 | RBR; SPR; 17 | RBR; FEA; 14 | SIL; SPR; 20 | SIL; FEA; Ret | HUN; SPR; Ret | HUN; FEA; 19 | SPA; SPR; 8 | SPA; FEA; 10 | ZAN; SPR; Ret | ZAN; FEA; 16 | MNZ; SPR; 19 | MNZ; FEA; 9 | YMC; SPR; 18 | YMC; FEA; 15 | | | 16th | 37 |

^{†} Did not finish, but was classified as he had completed more than 90% of the race distance.
^{‡} Half points awarded as less than 75% of race distance was completed.
* Season still in progress.
