= 2019 Budapest Formula 2 round =

(Hungary) 2019 Budapest Formula 2 round
Round details
- Round 8 of 12 in the 2019 FIA Formula 2 Championship.
- Layout of the Hungaroring
- Location: Hungaroring, Mogyoród, Hungary
- Course: Permanent racing facility 4.381 km (2.722 mi)

Feature race
- Date: 3 August 2019
- Laps: 37
Pole position
Driver	(Netherlands) Nyck de Vries	ART Grand Prix
Time	1:49.809	
Podium
First	(Canada) Nicholas Latifi	DAMS
Second	(Netherlands) Nyck de Vries	ART Grand Prix
Third	(United Kingdom) Jack Aitken	Campos Racing
Fastest lap
Driver	(United Kingdom) Jordan King	MP Motorsport
- Time: 1:32.436 (on lap 33)

Sprint race
- Date: 4 August 2019
- Laps: 28
Podium
First	(Germany) Mick Schumacher	Prema Racing
Second	(Japan) Nobuharu Matsushita	Carlin
Third	(Brazil) Sérgio Sette Câmara	DAMS
Fastest lap
Driver	(Japan) Nobuharu Matsushita	Carlin
- Time: 1:33.056 (on lap 4)

The 2019 Budapest Formula 2 round was a pair of motor races held on 3 and 4 August 2019 at the Hungaroring in Mogyoród, Hungary as part of the FIA Formula 2 Championship. It was the eighth round of the 2019 FIA Formula 2 Championship and was run in support of the 2019 Hungarian Grand Prix.

== Classification ==
=== Qualifying ===
Pos.	No.	Driver	Team	Time	Gap	Grid
1	4	(Netherlands) Nyck de Vries	ART Grand Prix	1:49.809	–	1
2	8	(Italy) Luca Ghiotto	UNI-Virtuosi	1:50.036	+0.227	2
3	6	(Canada) Nicholas Latifi	DAMS	1:50.578	+0.769	3
4	9	(Germany) Mick Schumacher	Prema Racing	1:50.748	+0.939	4
5	1	(Switzerland) Louis Delétraz	Carlin	1:50.853	+1.044	5
6	11	(United Kingdom) Callum Ilott	Sauber Junior Team by Charouz	1:50.871	+1.062	6
7	15	(United Kingdom) Jack Aitken	Campos Racing	1:50.962	+1.153	7
8	2	(Japan) Nobuharu Matsushita	Carlin	1:51.408	+1.599	8
9	7	(China) Guanyu Zhou	UNI-Virtuosi	1:51.573	+1.764	9
10	16	(United Kingdom) Jordan King	MP Motorsport	1:51.717	+1.908	10
11	12	(United States) Juan Manuel Correa	Sauber Junior Team by Charouz	1:51.788	+1.979	11
12	5	(Brazil) Sérgio Sette Câmara	DAMS	1:51.817	+2.008	12
13	20	(France) Giuliano Alesi	Trident	1:52.644	+2.835	13
14	14	(India) Arjun Maini	Campos Racing	1:52.718	+2.909	14
15	21	(Switzerland) Ralph Boschung	Trident	1:52.956	+3.147	15
16	10	(Indonesia) Sean Gelael	Prema Racing	1:52.995	+3.186	17^{1}
17	17	(Netherlands) Mahaveer Raghunathan	MP Motorsport	1:55.217	+5.408	16
107% time: 1:57.496
EX	19	(France) Anthoine Hubert	BWT Arden	no time		18^{2}
EX	18	(Colombia) Tatiana Calderón	BWT Arden	no time		20^{2}
—	3	(Russia) Nikita Mazepin	ART Grand Prix	no time		19

Notes

- ^1 – Sean Gelael served a three-place grid penalty that was due to be served at the previous round at Silverstone before he withdrew from the race.
- ^2 – Anthoine Hubert and Tatiana Calderón were excluded from the qualifying results and had their lap times deleted for failing to comply with the tyre nomination information supplied to the FIA. The stewards gave them permission to start the race.

=== Feature race ===
Pos.	No.	Driver	Team	Laps	Time/Retired	Grid	Points
1	6	(Canada) Nicholas Latifi	DAMS	37	1:02:40.675	3	25
2	4	(Netherlands) Nyck de Vries	ART Grand Prix	37	+0.752	1	18 (4)
3	15	(United Kingdom) Jack Aitken	Campos Racing	37	+1.045	7	15
4	8	(Italy) Luca Ghiotto	UNI-Virtuosi	37	+2.995	2	12
5	5	(Brazil) Sérgio Sette Câmara	DAMS	37	+4.144	12	10
6	16	(United Kingdom) Jordan King	MP Motorsport	37	+5.048	10	8 (2)
7	2	(Japan) Nobuharu Matsushita	Carlin	37	+5.282	8	6
8	9	(Germany) Mick Schumacher	Prema Racing	37	+15.807	4	4
9	7	(China) Guanyu Zhou	UNI-Virtuosi	37	+17.795	9	2
10	11	(United Kingdom) Callum Ilott	Sauber Junior Team by Charouz	37	+18.562	6	1
11	19	(France) Anthoine Hubert	BWT Arden	37	+20.018	18	
12	3	(Russia) Nikita Mazepin	ART Grand Prix	37	+22.072	19	
13	20	(France) Giuliano Alesi	Trident	37	+22.754	13	
14	12	(United States) Juan Manuel Correa	Sauber Junior Team by Charouz	37	+23.756	11	
15	10	(Indonesia) Sean Gelael	Prema Racing	37	+28.183^{1}	17	
16	18	(Colombia) Tatiana Calderón	BWT Arden	37	+1:15.823	20	
17	17	(Netherlands) Mahaveer Raghunathan	MP Motorsport	37	+1:16.712	16	
18	21	(Switzerland) Ralph Boschung	Trident	33	Engine^{2}	15	
DNF	14	(India) Arjun Maini	Campos Racing	17	Mechanical	14	
DNF	1	(Switzerland) Louis Delétraz	Carlin	3	Mechanical	5	
Fastest lap: Jordan King (MP Motorsport) — 1:32.436 (on lap 33)

Notes

- ^1 – Sean Gelael was given a five-second time penalty for speeding in the pit lane.
- ^2 - Ralph Boschung was classified despite retiring from the race as he completed more than 90% of the distance.

=== Sprint race ===
Pos.	No.	Driver	Team	Laps	Time/Retired	Grid	Points
1	9	(Germany) Mick Schumacher	Prema Racing	28	43:59.841	1	15
2	2	(Japan) Nobuharu Matsushita	Carlin	28	+1.453	2	12 (2)
3	5	(Brazil) Sérgio Sette Câmara	DAMS	28	+3.396	4	10
4	16	(United Kingdom) Jordan King	MP Motorsport	28	+4.177	3	8
5	15	(United Kingdom) Jack Aitken	Campos Racing	28	+4.960	6	6
6	4	(Netherlands) Nyck de Vries	ART Grand Prix	28	+11.428	7	4
7	6	(Canada) Nicholas Latifi	DAMS	28	+12.314	8	2
8	8	(Italy) Luca Ghiotto	UNI-Virtuosi	28	+12.930	5	1
9	7	(China) Guanyu Zhou	UNI-Virtuosi	28	+13.821	9	
10	11	(United Kingdom) Callum Ilott	Sauber Junior Team by Charouz	28	+23.877	10	
11	19	(France) Anthoine Hubert	BWT Arden	28	+26.891	11	
12	20	(France) Giuliano Alesi	Trident	28	+29.527	13	
13	1	(Switzerland) Louis Delétraz	Carlin	28	+35.741	20	
14	12	(United States) Juan Manuel Correa	Sauber Junior Team by Charouz	28	+38.514	14	
15	3	(Russia) Nikita Mazepin	ART Grand Prix	28	+39.932	12	
16	14	(India) Arjun Maini	Campos Racing	28	+40.093	19	
17	10	(Indonesia) Sean Gelael	Prema Racing	28	+40.737	15	
18	21	(Switzerland) Ralph Boschung	Trident	28	+42.857	18	
19	17	(Netherlands) Mahaveer Raghunathan	MP Motorsport	28	+59.688	17	
DNF	18	(Colombia) Tatiana Calderón	BWT Arden	7	Mechanical	16	
Fastest lap: Nobuharu Matsushita (Carlin) — 1:33.056 (on lap 4)

== Championship standings after the round ==
Drivers' Championship standings

	Pos.	Driver	Points
	1	(Netherlands) Nyck de Vries	196
	2	(Canada) Nicholas Latifi	166
1	3	(Brazil) Sérgio Sette Câmara	141
1	4	(Italy) Luca Ghiotto	135
	5	(United Kingdom) Jack Aitken	134

Teams' Championship standings

Pos.	Team	Points
1	(France) DAMS	307
2	(United Kingdom) UNI-Virtuosi	242
3	(France) ART Grand Prix	202
4	(Spain) Campos Racing	164
5	(United Kingdom) Carlin	145

== See also ==
- 2019 Hungarian Grand Prix
- 2019 Budapest Formula 3 round

Previous round: 2019 Silverstone Formula 2 round	FIA Formula 2 Championship; 2019 season	Next round: 2019 Spa-Francorchamps Formula 2 round
Previous round: 2018 Budapest Formula 2 round	Budapest Formula 2 round	Next round: 2020 Budapest Formula 2 round
