= 2020 2nd Silverstone Formula 2 round =

(United Kingdom) 2020 Silverstone Formula 2 round
Round details
- Round 5 of 12 in the 2020 FIA Formula 2 Championship.
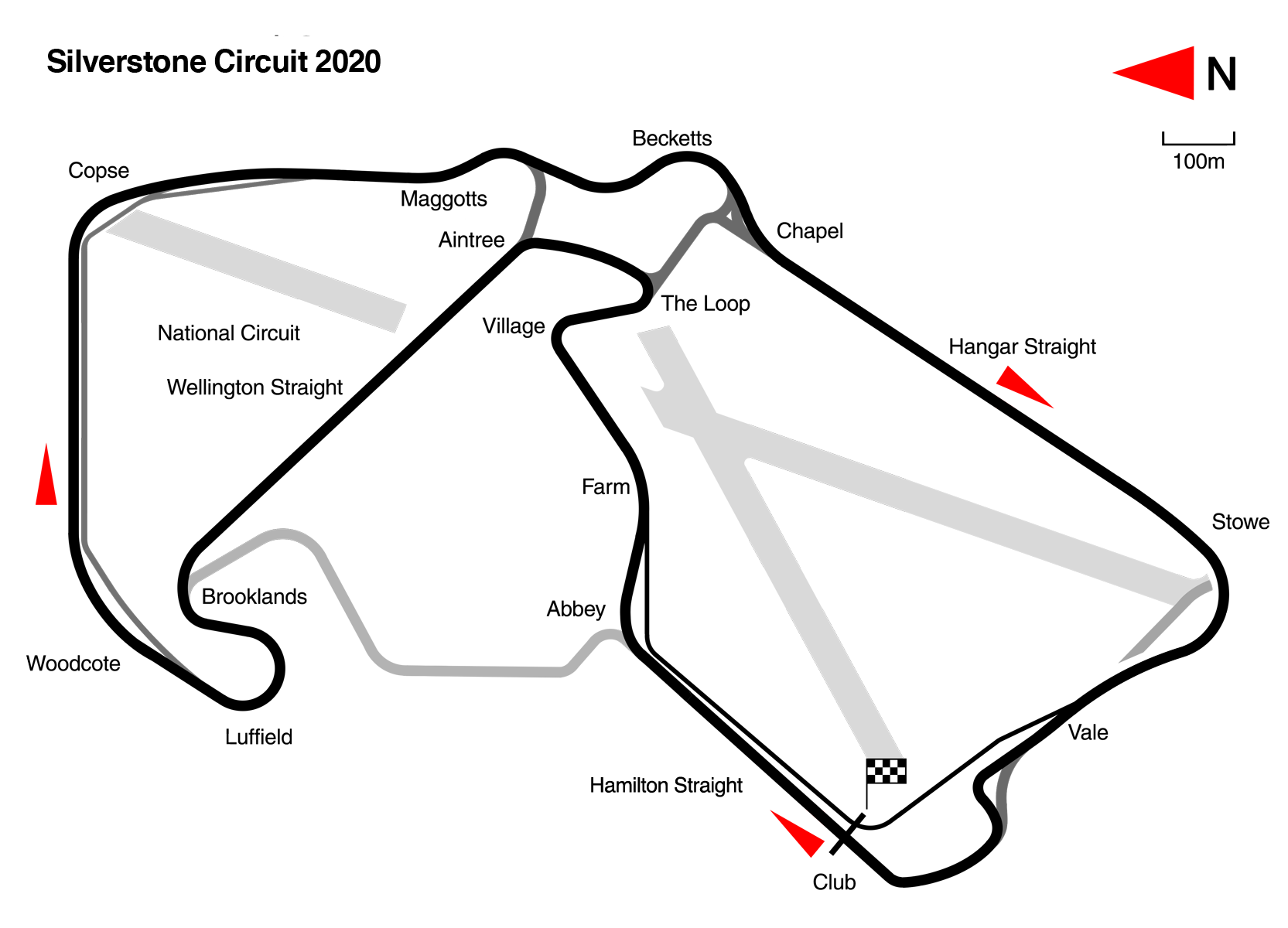
- Layout of the Silverstone Circuit
- Location: Silverstone Circuit; Silverstone, United Kingdom
- Course: Permanent racing circuit 5.891 km (3.660 mi)

Feature race
- Date: 8 August 2020
- Laps: 29
Pole position
Driver	(United Kingdom) Callum Ilott	Uni-Virtuosi
Time	1:39.062	
Podium
First	(United Kingdom) Callum Ilott	UNI-Virtuosi
Second	(Denmark) Christian Lundgaard	ART Grand Prix
Third	(United Kingdom) Jack Aitken	Campos Racing
Fastest lap
Driver	(China) Guanyu Zhou	UNI-Virtuosi
- Time: 1:42.754 (on lap 25)

Sprint race
- Date: 9 August 2020
- Laps: 21
Podium
First	(Japan) Yuki Tsunoda	Carlin
Second	(Germany) Mick Schumacher	Prema Racing
Third	(United Kingdom) Jack Aitken	Campos Racing
Fastest lap
Driver	(Germany) Mick Schumacher	Prema Racing
- Time: 1:41.887 (on lap 3)

The 2020 Silverstone FIA Formula 2 round was a pair of motor races involving Formula 2 cars that took place on 8 and 9 August 2020 at the Silverstone Circuit in Silverstone, Great Britain. The event is the fifth round of the 2020 FIA Formula 2 Championship and ran in support of the 70th Anniversary Grand Prix.

== Classification ==
=== Qualifying ===
Pos.	No.	Driver	Team	Time	Gap	Grid
1	4	(United Kingdom) Callum Ilott	UNI-Virtuosi	1:39.062		1
2	6	(Denmark) Christian Lundgaard	ART Grand Prix	1:39.177	+0.115	2
3	9	(United Kingdom) Jack Aitken	Campos Racing	1:39.278	+0.216	3
4	2	(United Kingdom) Dan Ticktum	DAMS	1:39.326	+0.264	4
5	25	(Italy) Luca Ghiotto	Hitech Grand Prix	1:39.362	+0.300	5
6	3	(China) Guanyu Zhou	UNI-Virtuosi	1:39.394	+0.332	6
7	24	(Russia) Nikita Mazepin	Hitech Grand Prix	1:39.410	+0.348	7
8	20	(Germany) Mick Schumacher	Prema Racing	1:39.448	+0.386	8
9	11	(Switzerland) Louis Delétraz	Charouz Racing System	1:39.474	+0.412	9
10	7	(Japan) Yuki Tsunoda	Carlin	1:39.494	+0.432	10
11	21	(Russia) Robert Shwartzman	Prema Racing	1:39.525	+0.463	11
12	15	(Brazil) Felipe Drugovich	MP Motorsport	1:39.526	+0.464	12
13	12	(Brazil) Pedro Piquet	Charouz Racing System	1:39.621	+0.559	13
14	23	(Japan) Marino Sato	Trident	1:39.679	+0.617	14
15	1	(Indonesia) Sean Gelael	DAMS	1:39.783	+0.721	20^{1}
16	8	(India) Jehan Daruvala	Carlin	1:39.790	+0.728	15
17	14	(Japan) Nobuharu Matsushita	MP Motorsport	1:39.961	+0.899	16
18	16	(Russia) Artem Markelov	BWT HWA Racelab	1:40.094	+1.032	17
19	5	(New Zealand) Marcus Armstrong	ART Grand Prix	1:40.299	+1.237	18
20	17	(France) Giuliano Alesi	HWA Racelab	1:40.485	+1.423	19
21	22	(Israel) Roy Nissany	Trident	1:40.615	+1.553	21
22	10	(Brazil) Guilherme Samaia	Campos Racing	1:41.061	+1.999	22

Notes

- ^1 Sean Gelael was given a five-place grid penalty for not having the correct number of tyres.

=== Feature Race ===
Pos.	No.	Driver	Entrant	Laps	Time/Retired	Grid	Points
1	4	(United Kingdom) Callum Ilott	UNI-Virtuosi	29	51:12.407	1	25 (4)
2	6	(Denmark) Christian Lundgaard	ART Grand Prix	29	+8.574	2	18
3	9	(United Kingdom) Jack Aitken	Campos Racing	29	+12.303	3	15
4	24	(Russia) Nikita Mazepin	Hitech Grand Prix	29	+15.020	7	12
5	11	(Switzerland) Louis Delétraz	Charouz Racing System	29	+16.644	9	10
6	7	(Japan) Yuki Tsunoda	Carlin	29	+17.010	10	8
7	20	(Germany) Mick Schumacher	Prema Racing	29	+19.232	8	6
8	21	(Russia) Robert Shwartzman	Prema Racing	29	+20.033	11	4
9	3	(China) Guanyu Zhou	UNI-Virtuosi	29	+20.428	6	2 (2)
10	15	(Brazil) Felipe Drugovich	MP Motorsport	29	+24.127	12	1
11	14	(Japan) Nobuharu Matsushita	MP Motorsport	29	+26.418	17	
12	8	(India) Jehan Daruvala	Carlin	29	+28.109	16	
13	25	(Italy) Luca Ghiotto	Hitech Grand Prix	29	+36.114	5	
14	5	(New Zealand) Marcus Armstrong	ART Grand Prix	29	+41.725	19	
15	2	(United Kingdom) Dan Ticktum	DAMS	29	+43.109	4	
16	17	(France) Giuliano Alesi	HWA Racelab	29	+43.252	20	
17	23	(Japan) Marino Sato	Trident	29	+50.048	20	
18	22	(Israel) Roy Nissany	Trident	29	+51.428	21	
19	16	(Russia) Artem Markelov	HWA Racelab	29	+1:14.193	18	
20	10	(Brazil) Guilherme Samaia	Campos Racing	29	+1:15.090	22	
21	12	(Brazil) Pedro Piquet	Charouz Racing System	28	+1 lap	13	
DNF	1	(Indonesia) Sean Gelael	DAMS	21	Gearbox	20	
Fastest lap: (China) Guanyu Zhou (UNI-Virtuosi) — 1:42.754 (on lap 25)

=== Sprint race ===
Pos.	No.	Driver	Entrant	Laps	Time/Retired	Grid	Points
1	7	(Japan) Yuki Tsunoda	Carlin	21	36:15.140	3	15
2	20	(Germany) Mick Schumacher	Prema Racing	21	+3.120	2	12 (2)
3	9	(United Kingdom) Jack Aitken	Campos Racing	21	+17.993	6	10
4	11	(Switzerland) Louis Delétraz	Charouz Racing System	21	+20.258	4	8
5	3	(China) Guanyu Zhou	UNI-Virtuosi	21	+21.059	9	6
6	4	(United Kingdom) Callum Ilott	UNI-Virtuosi	21	+22.154	8	4
7	2	(United Kingdom) Dan Ticktum	DAMS	21	+22.913	15	2
8	24	(Russia) Nikita Mazepin	Hitech Grand Prix	21	+25.201	5	1
9	8	(India) Jehan Daruvala	Carlin	21	+28.672	12	
10	25	(Italy) Luca Ghiotto	Hitech Grand Prix	21	+29.066	13	
11	16	(Russia) Artem Markelov	HWA Racelab	21	+33.686	19	
12	15	(Brazil) Felipe Drugovich	MP Motorsport	21	+34.776	10	
13	21	(Russia) Robert Shwartzman	Prema Racing	21	+36.362	1	
14	5	(New Zealand) Marcus Armstrong	ART Grand Prix	21	+37.995	14	
15	22	(Israel) Roy Nissany	Trident	21	+40.151	18	
16	12	(Brazil) Pedro Piquet	Charouz Racing System	21	+43.748	21	
17	23	(Japan) Marino Sato	Trident	21	+47.202	17	
18	14	(Japan) Nobuharu Matsushita	MP Motorsport	21	+1:00.275	11	
19	10	(Brazil) Guilherme Samaia	Campos Racing	21	+1:01.710	20	
20	17	(France) Giuliano Alesi	HWA Racelab	21	+1:31.548	16	
21	6	(Denmark) Christian Lundgaard	ART Grand Prix	20	+1 lap	7	
DNS	1	(Indonesia) Sean Gelael	DAMS	0	Did not start^{1}	22	
Fastest lap: (Germany) Mick Schumacher (Prema Racing) — 1:41.887 (on lap 3)

Notes:

- ^1 – Sean Gelael was making the formation lap, but later returned into the pits after suffering a mechanical issue, forcing him to rule out of the race as a consequence.

== Standings after the event ==
Drivers' Championship standings

	Pos.	Driver	Points
1	1	(United Kingdom) Callum Ilott	106
1	2	(Denmark) Christian Lundgaard	87
2	3	(Russia) Robert Shwartzman	85
	4	(Russia) Nikita Mazepin	71
2	5	(Switzerland) Louis Delétraz	64

Teams' Championship standings

	Pos.	Team	Points
	1	(United Kingdom) UNI-Virtuosi	167
	2	(Italy) Prema Racing	146
	3	(France) ART Grand Prix	121
	4	(United Kingdom) Hitech Grand Prix	98
1	5	(United Kingdom) Carlin	80

- Note: Only the top five positions are included for both sets of standings.

== See also ==
- 2020 70th Anniversary Grand Prix
- 2020 2nd Silverstone Formula 3 round

Previous round: 2020 Silverstone Formula 2 round	FIA Formula 2 Championship; 2020 season	Next round: 2020 Barcelona Formula 2 round
Previous round: 2020 Silverstone Formula 2 round	Silverstone Formula 2 round	Next round: 2021 Silverstone Formula 2 round
