= 2019 Silverstone Formula 2 round =

(United Kingdom) 2019 Silverstone Formula 2 round
Round details
- Round 7 of 12 in the 2019 FIA Formula 2 Championship.
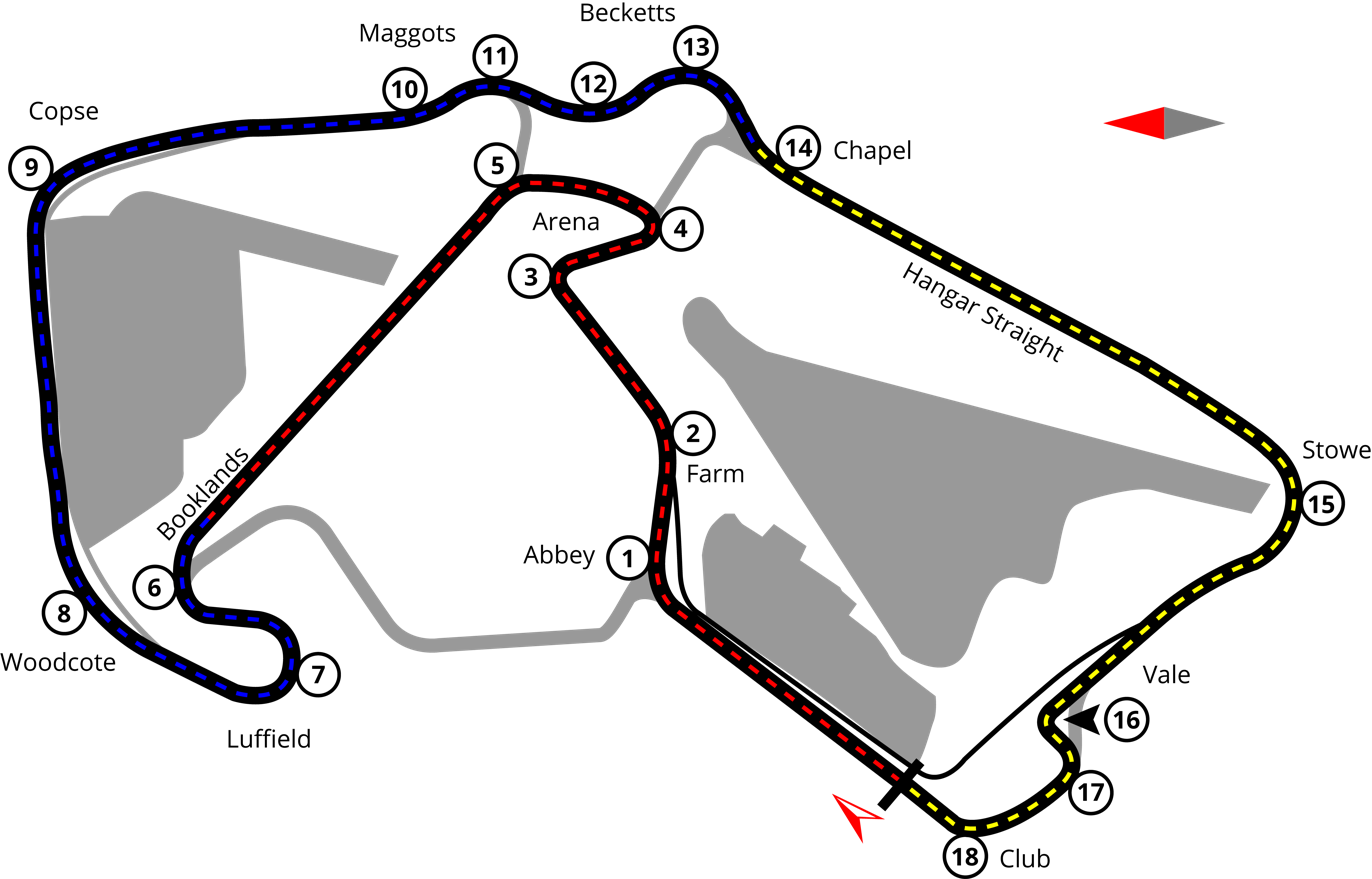
- Layout of the Silverstone Circuit
- Location: Silverstone Circuit, Silverstone, United Kingdom
- Course: Permanent racing facility 5.891 km (3.660 mi)

Feature race
- Date: 13 July 2019
- Laps: 29
Pole position
Driver	(China) Guanyu Zhou	UNI-Virtuosi
Time	1:38.182	
Podium
First	(Italy) Luca Ghiotto	UNI-Virtuosi
Second	(Canada) Nicholas Latifi	DAMS
Third	(China) Guanyu Zhou	UNI-Virtuosi
Fastest lap
Driver	(Brazil) Sérgio Sette Câmara	DAMS
- Time: 1:40.858 (on lap 24)

Sprint race
- Date: 14 July 2019
- Laps: 21
Podium
First	(United Kingdom) Jack Aitken	Campos Racing
Second	(Switzerland) Louis Delétraz	Carlin
Third	(Netherlands) Nyck de Vries	ART Grand Prix
Fastest lap
Driver	(United Kingdom) Jack Aitken	Campos Racing
- Time: 1:39.993 (on lap 20)

The 2019 Silverstone FIA Formula 2 round was a pair of motor races held on 13 and 14 July 2019 at the Silverstone Circuit in Silverstone, United Kingdom as part of the FIA Formula 2 Championship. It was the seventh round of the 2019 FIA Formula 2 Championship and ran in support of the 2019 British Grand Prix.

== Background ==
=== Driver changes ===
Mahaveer Raghunathan returned to MP Motorsport after his one-race ban, replacing Patricio O'Ward. After leaving Campos Racing after the Paul Ricard round, Dorian Boccolacci returned to the series at Trident replacing Ryan Tveter.

== Classification ==
=== Qualifying ===
Pos.	No.	Driver	Team	Time	Gap	Grid
1	7	(China) Guanyu Zhou	UNI-Virtuosi	1:38.182	–	1
2	8	(Italy) Luca Ghiotto	UNI-Virtuosi	1:38.410	+0.228	2
3	5	(Brazil) Sérgio Sette Câmara	DAMS	1:38.511	+0.329	3
4	6	(Canada) Nicholas Latifi	DAMS	1:38.519	+0.337	4
5	1	(Switzerland) Louis Delétraz	Carlin	1:38.547	+0.365	5
6	11	(United Kingdom) Callum Ilott	Sauber Junior Team by Charouz	1:38.549	+0.367	6
7	4	(Netherlands) Nyck de Vries	ART Grand Prix	1:38.613	+0.431	7
8	15	(United Kingdom) Jack Aitken	Campos Racing	1:38.686	+0.504	8
9	2	(Japan) Nobuharu Matsushita	Carlin	1:38.877	+0.695	9
10	19	(France) Anthoine Hubert	BWT Arden	1:39.046	+0.864	10
11	12	(United States) Juan Manuel Correa	Sauber Junior Team by Charouz	1:39.071	+0.889	11
12	16	(United Kingdom) Jordan King	MP Motorsport	1:39.225	+1.043	12
13	9	(Germany) Mick Schumacher	Prema Racing	1:39.227	+1.045	13
14	14	(India) Arjun Maini	Campos Racing	1:39.512	+1.330	14
15	20	(France) Giuliano Alesi	Trident	1:39.574	+1.392	15
16	3	(Russia) Nikita Mazepin	ART Grand Prix	1:39.615	+1.433	16
17	21	(France) Dorian Boccolacci	Trident	1:39.622	+1.440	17
18	10	(Indonesia) Sean Gelael	Prema Racing	1:39.790	+1.608	20^{1}
19	18	(Colombia) Tatiana Calderón	BWT Arden	1:40.530	+2.348	18
20	17	(Netherlands) Mahaveer Raghunathan	MP Motorsport	1:41.725	+3.543	19

Notes

- ^1 – Sean Gelael was given a three-place grid penalty for causing a collision during the practice session. He later withdrew from the race weekend following the incident.

=== Feature race ===
Pos.	No.	Driver	Team	Laps	Time/Retired	Grid	Points
1	8	(Italy) Luca Ghiotto	UNI-Virtuosi	29	50:21.114	2	25
2	6	(Canada) Nicholas Latifi	DAMS	29	+3.314	4	18
3	7	(China) Guanyu Zhou	UNI-Virtuosi	29	+7.186	1	15 (4)
4	5	(Brazil) Sérgio Sette Câmara	DAMS	29	+11.841	3	12 (2)
5	15	(United Kingdom) Jack Aitken	Campos Racing	29	+13.744	8	10
6	4	(Netherlands) Nyck de Vries	ART Grand Prix	29	+18.969	7	8
7	1	(Switzerland) Louis Delétraz	Carlin	29	+19.466	5	6
8	11	(United Kingdom) Callum Ilott	Sauber Junior Team by Charouz	29	+23.144	6	4
9	2	(Japan) Nobuharu Matsushita	Carlin	29	+24.263	9	2
10	16	(United Kingdom) Jordan King	MP Motorsport	29	+30.176	12	1
11	9	(Germany) Mick Schumacher	Prema Racing	29	+31.100	13	
12	12	(United States) Juan Manuel Correa	Sauber Junior Team by Charouz	29	+47.708	11	
13	14	(India) Arjun Maini	Campos Racing	29	+52.072^{1}	14	
14	18	(Colombia) Tatiana Calderón	BWT Arden	29	+1:19.155	18	
15	17	(Netherlands) Mahaveer Raghunathan	MP Motorsport	29	+1:31.116	19	
16	3	(Russia) Nikita Mazepin	ART Grand Prix	28	Collision damage^{2}	16	
17	20	(France) Giuliano Alesi	Trident	28	+1 lap^{3}	15	
18	19	(France) Anthoine Hubert	BWT Arden	28	+1 lap	10	
DNF	21	(France) Dorian Boccolacci	Trident	1	Mechanical	17	
WD	10	(Indonesia) Sean Gelael	Prema Racing	0	Withdrew	—	
Fastest lap: Sérgio Sette Câmara (DAMS) — 1:40.858 (on lap 24)

Notes

- ^1 – Arjun Maini originally finished 12th but received a five-second time penalty for causing a collision.
- ^2 – Nikita Mazepin received a five-second time penalty for speeding in the pit lane.
- ^3 – Giuliano Alesi received a five-second time penalty for speeding in the pit lane and a thirty-second time penalty for an unsafe release.

=== Sprint race ===
Pos.	No.	Driver	Team	Laps	Time/Retired	Grid	Points
1	15	(United Kingdom) Jack Aitken	Campos Racing	21	36:47.822	4	15 (2)
2	1	(Switzerland) Louis Delétraz	Carlin	21	+4.997	2	12
3	4	(Netherlands) Nyck de Vries	ART Grand Prix	21	+8.194	3	10
4	11	(United Kingdom) Callum Ilott	Sauber Junior Team by Charouz	21	+8.850	1	8
5	6	(Canada) Nicholas Latifi	DAMS	21	+16.203	7	6
6	9	(Germany) Mick Schumacher	Prema Racing	21	+19.222	11	4
7	2	(Japan) Nobuharu Matsushita	Carlin	21	+19.666	9	2
8	7	(China) Guanyu Zhou	UNI-Virtuosi	21	+20.181	6	1
9	16	(United Kingdom) Jordan King	MP Motorsport	21	+21.731	10	
10	12	(United States) Juan Manuel Correa	Sauber Junior Team by Charouz	21	+25.820	12	
11	19	(France) Anthoine Hubert	BWT Arden	21	+34.309	18	
12	3	(Russia) Nikita Mazepin	ART Grand Prix	21	+37.426	16	
13	14	(India) Arjun Maini	Campos Racing	21	+40.581	13	
14	21	(France) Dorian Boccolacci	Trident	21	+47.259	19	
15	8	(Italy) Luca Ghiotto	UNI-Virtuosi	21	+57.696	8	
16	18	(Colombia) Tatiana Calderón	BWT Arden	21	+59.998	14	
17	5	(Brazil) Sérgio Sette Câmara	DAMS	21	+1:09.991	5	
18	17	(Netherlands) Mahaveer Raghunathan	MP Motorsport	21	+1:10.157	15	
DNF	20	(France) Giuliano Alesi	Trident	1	Mechanical	17	
WD	10	(Indonesia) Sean Gelael	Prema Racing	—	Withdrew	—	
Fastest lap: Jack Aitken (Campos Racing) — 1:39.993 (on lap 20)

== Championship standings after the round ==
Drivers' Championship standings

	Pos.	Driver	Points
	1	(Netherlands) Nyck de Vries	170
	2	(Canada) Nicholas Latifi	139
1	3	(Italy) Luca Ghiotto	122
1	4	(Brazil) Sérgio Sette Câmara	121
	5	(United Kingdom) Jack Aitken	113

Teams' Championship standings

Pos.	Team	Points
1	(France) DAMS	260
2	(United Kingdom) UNI-Virtuosi	227
3	(France) ART Grand Prix	176
4	(Spain) Campos Racing	143
5	(United Kingdom) Carlin	125

== See also ==
- 2019 British Grand Prix
- 2019 Silverstone Formula 3 round

Previous round: 2019 Spielberg Formula 2 round	FIA Formula 2 Championship; 2019 season	Next round: 2019 Budapest Formula 2 round
Previous round: 2018 Silverstone Formula 2 round	Silverstone Formula 2 round	Next round: 2020 Silverstone Formula 2 round
