= 2019 Spielberg Formula 2 round =

Pair of motor races held at the Red Bull Ring, Austria

(Austria) 2019 Spielberg Formula 2 round
Round details
- Round 6 of 12 in the 2019 FIA Formula 2 Championship.
- Layout of the Red Bull Ring
- Location: Red Bull Ring; Spielberg, Styria, Austria
- Course: Permanent racing circuit 4.318 km (2.683 mi)

Feature race
- Date: 29 June 2019
- Laps: 40
Pole position
Driver	(Netherlands) Nyck de Vries	ART Grand Prix
Time	1:14.143	
Podium
First	(Japan) Nobuharu Matsushita	Carlin
Second	(Italy) Luca Ghiotto	UNI-Virtuosi
Third	(Netherlands) Nyck de Vries	ART Grand Prix
Fastest lap
Driver	(Brazil) Sérgio Sette Câmara	DAMS
- Time: 1:18.209 (on lap 34)

Sprint race
- Date: 30 June 2019
- Laps: 28
Podium
First	(Brazil) Sérgio Sette Câmara	DAMS
Second	(Italy) Luca Ghiotto	UNI-Virtuosi
Third	(Netherlands) Nyck de Vries	ART Grand Prix
Fastest lap
Driver	(Netherlands) Nyck de Vries	ART Grand Prix
- Time: 1:18.159 (on lap 3)

The 2019 Spielberg Formula 2 round was a pair of motor races for Formula 2 cars that took place on 29 and 30 June 2019 at the Red Bull Ring in Spielberg, in Austria as part of the FIA Formula 2 Championship. It was the sixth round of the 2019 FIA Formula 2 Championship and ran in support of the 2019 Austrian Grand Prix.

== Background ==
=== Driver changes ===
Mahaveer Raghunathan received a one-race ban after reaching twelve penalty points on his racing license during the Paul Ricard feature race. His seat at MP Motorsport for the round was taken by Patricio O'Ward.

Elsewhere, Dorian Boccolacci was replaced at Campos Racing by Arjun Maini, and Ralph Boschung left Trident with Ryan Tveter taking his place for the round.

== Classification ==
=== Qualifying ===
Pos.	No.	Driver	Team	Time	Gap	Grid
1	4	(Netherlands) Nyck de Vries	ART Grand Prix	1:14.143	–	1
2	19	(France) Anthoine Hubert	BWT Arden	1:14.309	+0.166	2
3	7	(China) Guanyu Zhou	UNI-Virtuosi	1:14.371	+0.228	3
4	2	(Japan) Nobuharu Matsushita	Carlin	1:14.399	+0.256	4
5	8	(Italy) Luca Ghiotto	UNI-Virtuosi	1:14.429	+0.286	5
6	6	(Canada) Nicholas Latifi	DAMS	1:14.483	+0.340	6
7	9	(Germany) Mick Schumacher	Prema Racing	1:14.488	+0.345	7
8	1	(Switzerland) Louis Delétraz	Carlin	1:14.625	+0.482	8
9	5	(Brazil) Sérgio Sette Câmara	DAMS	1:14.709	+0.566	9
10	11	(United Kingdom) Callum Ilott	Sauber Junior Team by Charouz	1:14.755	+0.612	10
11	10	(Indonesia) Sean Gelael	Prema Racing	1:14.808	+0.665	11
12	3	(Russia) Nikita Mazepin	ART Grand Prix	1:14.882	+0.739	12
13	12	(United States) Juan Manuel Correa	Sauber Junior Team by Charouz	1:14.887	+0.744	13
14	15	(United Kingdom) Jack Aitken	Campos Racing	1:14.986	+0.843	14
15	16	(United Kingdom) Jordan King	MP Motorsport	1:15.139	+0.996	15
16	20	(France) Giuliano Alesi	Trident	1:15.212	+1.069	16
17	17	(United States) Patricio O'Ward	MP Motorsport	1:15.327	+1.184	17
18	14	(India) Arjun Maini	Campos Racing	1:15.363	+1.220	18
19	21	(United States) Ryan Tveter	Trident	1:15.435	+1.292	19
20	18	(Colombia) Tatiana Calderón	BWT Arden	1:16.164	+2.021	20

=== Feature race ===
Pos.	No.	Driver	Team	Laps	Time/Retired	Grid	Points
1	2	(Japan) Nobuharu Matsushita	Carlin	40	53:32.606	4	25
2	8	(Italy) Luca Ghiotto	UNI-Virtuosi	40	+2.963	5	18
3	4	(Netherlands) Nyck de Vries	ART Grand Prix	40	+10.428	1	15 (4)
4	19	(France) Anthoine Hubert	BWT Arden	40	+10.786	2	12
5	5	(Brazil) Sérgio Sette Câmara	DAMS	40	+12.720^{1}	9	10 (2)
6	7	(China) Guanyu Zhou	UNI-Virtuosi	40	+15.514	3	8
7	1	(Switzerland) Louis Delétraz	Carlin	40	+16.541^{2}	8	6
8	16	(United Kingdom) Jordan King	MP Motorsport	40	+22.321	15	4
9	6	(Canada) Nicholas Latifi	DAMS	40	+23.184	6	2
10	15	(United Kingdom) Jack Aitken	Campos Racing	40	+32.919	14	1
11	12	(United States) Juan Manuel Correa	Sauber Junior Team by Charouz	40	+35.892	13	
12	3	(Russia) Nikita Mazepin	ART Grand Prix	40	+35.988	12	
13	20	(France) Giuliano Alesi	Trident	40	+39.890	16	
14	11	(United Kingdom) Callum Ilott	Sauber Junior Team by Charouz	40	+46.138	10	
15	21	(United States) Ryan Tveter	Trident	40	+1:10.057	19	
16	10	(Indonesia) Sean Gelael	Prema Racing	40	+1:15.742	11	
17	18	(Colombia) Tatiana Calderón	BWT Arden	40	+1:16.586	20	
18	9	(Germany) Mick Schumacher	Prema Racing	39	+1 lap	7	
19	17	(United States) Patricio O'Ward	MP Motorsport	39	+1 lap	17	
DSQ	14	(India) Arjun Maini	Campos Racing	40	Disqualified^{3}	18	
Fastest lap: Sérgio Sette Câmara (DAMS) — 1:18.209 (on lap 34)

Notes

- ^1 – Sérgio Sette Câmara was given a five-second time penalty for causing a collision.
- ^2 – Louis Delétraz was given a five-second time penalty for speeding in the pit lane.
- ^3 – Arjun Maini originally finished 15th but was disqualified after his tyres were found to have been fitted incorrectly before the race start.

=== Sprint race ===
Pos.	No.	Driver	Team	Laps	Time/Retired	Grid	Points
1	5	(Brazil) Sérgio Sette Câmara	DAMS	28	38:45.691	4	15
2	8	(Italy) Luca Ghiotto	UNI-Virtuosi	28	+0.563	7	12
3	4	(Netherlands) Nyck de Vries	ART Grand Prix	28	+5.536	6	10 (2)
4	9	(Germany) Mick Schumacher	Prema Racing	28	+5.781	18	8
5	2	(Japan) Nobuharu Matsushita	Carlin	28	+6.269	8	6
6	6	(Canada) Nicholas Latifi	DAMS	28	+13.230	9	4
7	16	(United Kingdom) Jordan King	MP Motorsport	28	+14.095	1	2
8	7	(China) Guanyu Zhou	UNI-Virtuosi	28	+15.086	3	1
9	11	(United Kingdom) Callum Ilott	Sauber Junior Team by Charouz	28	+15.659	14	
10	12	(United States) Juan Manuel Correa	Sauber Junior Team by Charouz	28	+16.607	11	
11	3	(Russia) Nikita Mazepin	ART Grand Prix	28	+18.290	12	
12	10	(Indonesia) Sean Gelael	Prema Racing	28	+19.486	16	
13	18	(Colombia) Tatiana Calderón	BWT Arden	28	+21.136	17	
14	17	(United States) Patricio O'Ward	MP Motorsport	28	+22.294	19	
15	14	(India) Arjun Maini	Campos Racing	28	+22.856	20	
16	21	(United States) Ryan Tveter	Trident	28	+25.302	15	
17	19	(France) Anthoine Hubert	BWT Arden	28	+29.057^{1}	5	
18	15	(United Kingdom) Jack Aitken	Campos Racing	28	+40.537^{2}	10	
DNF	1	(Switzerland) Louis Delétraz	Carlin	19	Crash	2	
DNF	20	(France) Giuliano Alesi	Trident	3	Gearbox	13	
Fastest lap: Nyck de Vries (ART Grand Prix) — 1:18.159 (on lap 3)^{3}

Notes

- ^1 – Anthoine Hubert originally finished 16th but was given a five-second time penalty for causing a collision.
- ^2 – Jack Aitken was given a five-second time penalty for causing a collision and an additional five-second time penalty for a violation of the minimum delta time under the safety car.
- ^3 – Nyck de Vries and Sérgio Sette Câmara set the same fastest lap times, but de Vries was awarded the points for fastest lap as he was the first to achieve the lap time.

== Championship standings after the round ==
Drivers' Championship standings

	Pos.	Driver	Points
	1	(Netherlands) Nyck de Vries	152
	2	(Canada) Nicholas Latifi	115
1	3	(Brazil) Sérgio Sette Câmara	107
2	4	(Italy) Luca Ghiotto	97
2	5	(United Kingdom) Jack Aitken	86

Teams' Championship standings

Pos.	Team	Points
1	(France) DAMS	222
2	(United Kingdom) UNI-Virtuosi	182
3	(France) ART Grand Prix	158
4	(Spain) Campos Racing	116
5	(United Kingdom) Carlin	103

== See also ==
- 2019 Austrian Grand Prix
- 2019 Spielberg Formula 3 round

Previous round: 2019 Le Castellet Formula 2 round	FIA Formula 2 Championship; 2019 season	Next round: 2019 Silverstone Formula 2 round
Previous round: 2018 Spielberg Formula 2 round	Spielberg Formula 2 round	Next round: 2020 Spielberg Formula 2 round
