= 2020 Silverstone Formula 2 round =

(United Kingdom) 2020 Silverstone Formula 2 round
Round details
- Round 4 of 12 in the 2020 FIA Formula 2 Championship.
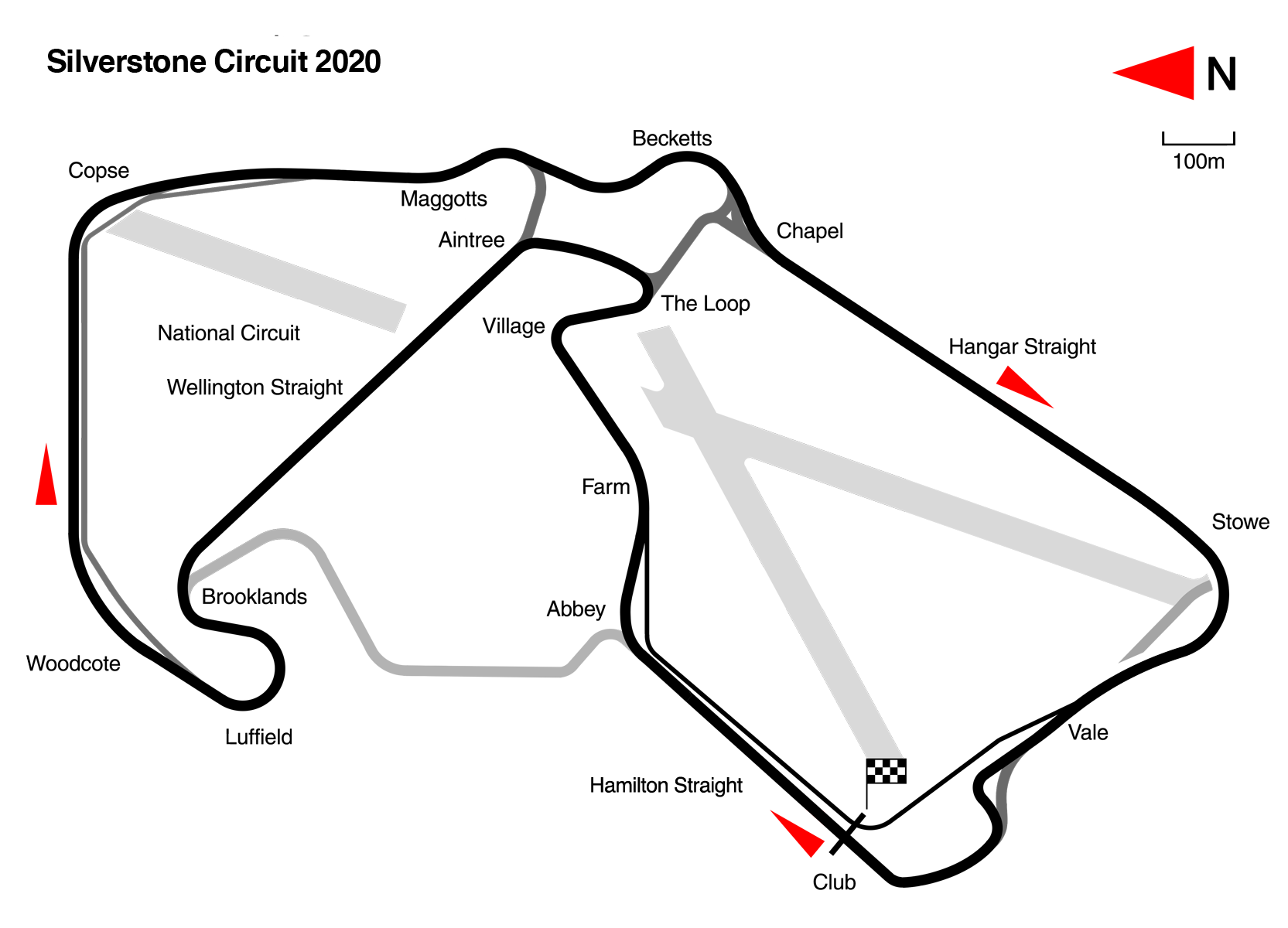
- Layout of the Silverstone Circuit
- Location: Silverstone Circuit; Silverstone, United Kingdom
- Course: Permanent racing circuit 5.891 km (3.660 mi)

Feature race
- Date: 1 August 2020
- Laps: 29
Pole position
Driver	(Brazil) Felipe Drugovich	MP Motorsport
Time	1:39.527	
Podium
First	(Russia) Nikita Mazepin	Hitech Grand Prix
Second	(China) Guanyu Zhou	UNI-Virtuosi
Third	(Japan) Yuki Tsunoda	Carlin
Fastest lap
Driver	(China) Guanyu Zhou	UNI-Virtuosi
- Time: 1:42.676 (on lap 23)

Sprint race
- Date: 2 August 2020
- Laps: 21
Podium
First	(United Kingdom) Dan Ticktum	DAMS
Second	(Denmark) Christian Lundgaard	ART Grand Prix
Third	(Switzerland) Louis Delétraz	Charouz Racing System
Fastest lap
Driver	(Denmark) Christian Lundgaard	ART Grand Prix
- Time: 1:41.337 (on lap 21)

The 2020 Silverstone FIA Formula 2 round was a pair of motor races involving Formula 2 cars that took place on 1 and 2 August 2020 at the Silverstone Circuit in Silverstone, Great Britain. The event is the fourth round of the 2020 FIA Formula 2 Championship and ran in support of the 2020 British Grand Prix.

== Classification ==
=== Qualifying ===
Pos.	No.	Driver	Team	Time	Gap	Grid
1	15	(Brazil) Felipe Drugovich	MP Motorsport	1:39.527		1
2	4	(United Kingdom) Callum Ilott	UNI-Virtuosi	1:39.666	+0.139	2
3	20	(Germany) Mick Schumacher	Prema Racing	1:39.761	+0.234	3
4	6	(Denmark) Christian Lundgaard	ART Grand Prix	1:39.846	+0.319	4
5	24	(Russia) Nikita Mazepin	Hitech Grand Prix	1:39.963	+0.436	5
6	9	(United Kingdom) Jack Aitken	Campos Racing	1:40.082	+0.555	6
7	8	(India) Jehan Daruvala	Carlin	1:40.140	+0.613	7
8	3	(China) Guanyu Zhou	UNI-Virtuosi	1:40.180	+0.653	8
9	7	(Japan) Yuki Tsunoda	Carlin	1:40.216	+0.689	9
10	11	(Switzerland) Louis Delétraz	Charouz Racing System	1:40.324	+0.797	10
11	14	(Japan) Nobuharu Matsushita	MP Motorsport	1:40.347	+0.820	11
12	2	(United Kingdom) Dan Ticktum	DAMS	1:40.396	+0.869	12
13	25	(Italy) Luca Ghiotto	Hitech Grand Prix	1:40.421	+0.894	13
14	12	(Brazil) Pedro Piquet	Charouz Racing System	1:40.443	+0.916	14
15	5	(New Zealand) Marcus Armstrong	ART Grand Prix	1:40.448	+0.921	15
16	1	(Indonesia) Sean Gelael	DAMS	1:40.476	+0.949	16
17	23	(Japan) Marino Sato	Trident	1:40.958	+1.431	17
18	21	(Russia) Robert Shwartzman	Prema Racing	1:41.047	+1.520	18
19	22	(Israel) Roy Nissany	Trident	1:41.052	+1.525	19
20	17	(France) Giuliano Alesi	HWA Racelab	1:41.274	+1.747	20
21	16	(Russia) Artem Markelov	HWA Racelab	1:41.342	+1.815	21
22	10	(Brazil) Guilherme Samaia	Campos Racing	1:42.204	+2.677	22

=== Feature Race ===
Pos.	No.	Driver	Entrant	Laps	Time/Retired	Grid	Points
1	24	(Russia) Nikita Mazepin	Hitech Grand Prix	29	51:17.953	5	25
2	3	(China) Guanyu Zhou	UNI-Virtuosi	29	+5.323	8	18 (2)
3	7	(Japan) Yuki Tsunoda	Carlin	29	+7.406	9	15
4	6	(Denmark) Christian Lundgaard	ART Grand Prix	29	+8.094	4	12
5	4	(United Kingdom) Callum Ilott	UNI-Virtuosi	29	+10.764	2	10
6	11	(Switzerland) Louis Delétraz	Charouz Racing System	29	+16.121	10	8
7	15	(Brazil) Felipe Drugovich	MP Motorsport	29	+18.136	1	6 (4)
8	2	(United Kingdom) Dan Ticktum	DAMS	29	+20.580	12	4
9	20	(Germany) Mick Schumacher	Prema Racing	29	+24.742	3	2
10	14	(Japan) Nobuharu Matsushita	MP Motorsport	29	+25.319	11	1
11	12	(Brazil) Pedro Piquet	Charouz Racing System	29	+26.230	14	
12	8	(India) Jehan Daruvala	Carlin	29	+26.527	7	
13	9	(United Kingdom) Jack Aitken	Campos Racing	29	+26.744	6	
14	21	(Russia) Robert Shwartzman	Prema Racing	29	+30.767	18	
15	1	(Indonesia) Sean Gelael	DAMS	29	+31.585	16	
16	5	(New Zealand) Marcus Armstrong	ART Grand Prix	29	+37.827	15	
17	25	(Italy) Luca Ghiotto	Hitech Grand Prix	29	+45.263	13	
18	16	(Russia) Artem Markelov	HWA Racelab	29	+53.528	21	
19	17	(France) Giuliano Alesi	HWA Racelab	29	+1:00.579	20	
20	23	(Japan) Marino Sato	Trident	29	+1:12.128	17	
21	10	(Brazil) Guilherme Samaia	Campos Racing	29	+1:27.775	22	
DNF	22	(Israel) Roy Nissany	Trident	4	Mechanical	19	
Fastest lap: (China) Guanyu Zhou (UNI-Virtuosi) — 1:42.676 (on lap 23)

=== Sprint race ===
Pos.	No.	Driver	Entrant	Laps	Time/Retired	Grid	Points
1	2	(United Kingdom) Dan Ticktum	DAMS	21	39:50.019	1	15
2	6	(Denmark) Christian Lundgaard	ART Grand Prix	21	+0.376	5	12 (2)
3	11	(Switzerland) Louis Delétraz	Charouz Racing System	21	+2.697	3	10
4	8	(India) Jehan Daruvala	Carlin	21	+6.257	12	8
5	24	(Russia) Nikita Mazepin	Hitech Grand Prix	21	+6.483	8	6
6	15	(Brazil) Felipe Drugovich	MP Motorsport	21	+8.459	2	4
7	14	(Japan) Nobuharu Matsushita	MP Motorsport	21	+8.956	10	2
8	9	(United Kingdom) Jack Aitken	Campos Racing	21	+9.782	13	1
9	3	(China) Guanyu Zhou	UNI-Virtuosi	21	+10.848	7	
10	5	(New Zealand) Marcus Armstrong	ART Grand Prix	21	+10.995	16	
11	16	(Russia) Artem Markelov	HWA Racelab	21	+17.417	18	
12	23	(Japan) Marino Sato	Trident	21	+18.643	20	
13	21	(Russia) Robert Shwartzman	Prema Racing	21	+22.320	14	
14	20	(Germany) Mick Schumacher	Prema Racing	21	+26.230	9	
15	10	(Brazil) Guilherme Samaia	Campos Racing	21	+28.531	21	
16	22	(Israel) Roy Nissany	Trident	21	+31.974	22	
17	12	(Brazil) Pedro Piquet	Charouz Racing System	21	+41.395	11	
18	17	(France) Giuliano Alesi	HWA Racelab	20	+1 lap	19	
19	25	(Italy) Luca Ghiotto	Hitech Grand Prix	19	Mechanical	17	
DNF	1	(Indonesia) Sean Gelael	DAMS	16	Wheel	15	
DNF	4	(United Kingdom) Callum Ilott	UNI-Virtuosi	14	Spun off	4	
DNF	7	(Japan) Yuki Tsunoda	Carlin	0	Collision	6	
Fastest lap: (Denmark) Christian Lundgaard (ART Grand Prix) — 1:41.337 (on lap 21)

== Standings after the event ==
Drivers' Championship standings

	Pos.	Driver	Points
	1	(Russia) Robert Shwartzman	81
	2	(United Kingdom) Callum Ilott	73
	3	(Denmark) Christian Lundgaard	69
8	4	(Russia) Nikita Mazepin	58
	5	(United Kingdom) Dan Ticktum	57

Teams' Championship standings

	Pos.	Team	Points
1	1	(United Kingdom) UNI-Virtuosi Racing	124
1	2	(Italy) Prema Racing	122
	3	(France) ART Grand Prix	103
	4	(United Kingdom) Hitech Grand Prix	85
	5	(France) DAMS	60

- Note: Only the top five positions are included for both sets of standings.

== See also ==
- 2020 British Grand Prix
- 2020 Silverstone Formula 3 round

Previous round: 2020 Hungaroring Formula 2 round	FIA Formula 2 Championship; 2020 season	Next round: 2020 2nd Silverstone Formula 2 round
Previous round: 2019 Silverstone Formula 2 round	Silverstone Formula 2 round	Next round: 2020 2nd Silverstone Formula 2 round
