= Giuliano Alesi =

French racing driver (born 1999)

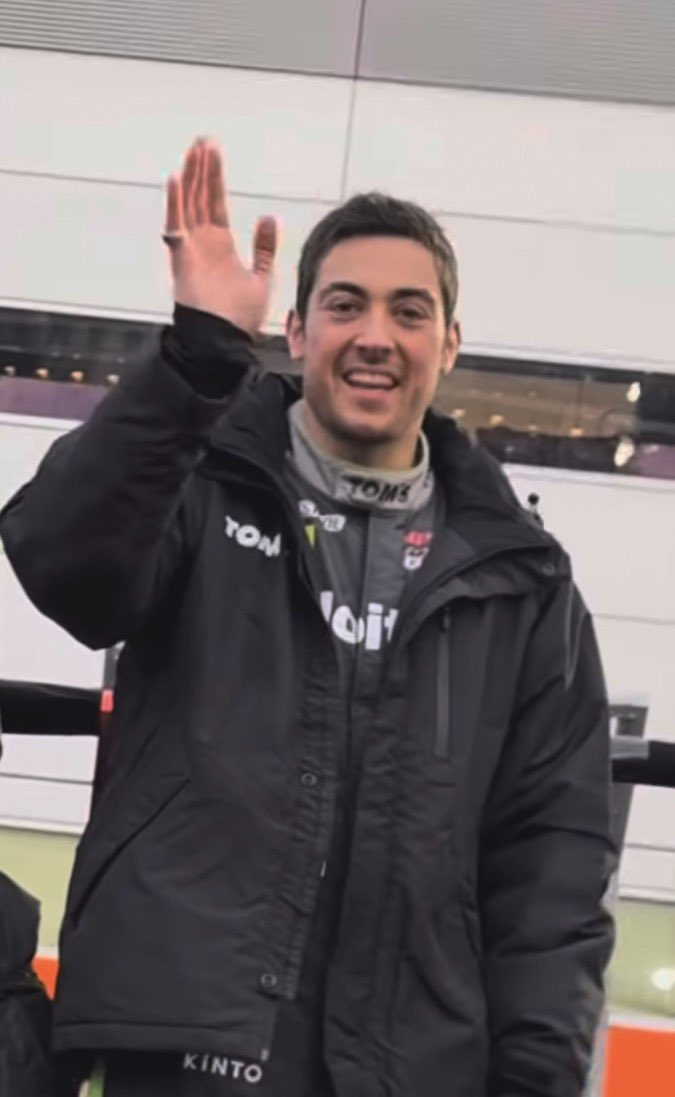
- Alesi in 2025
- Nationality: (France) French
- Born: Giuliano Ryu Alesi; 20 September 1999 (age 27) Avignon, France
- Relatives: Jean Alesi (father); Kumiko Goto (mother)

Super GT - GT500 career
- Debut season: 2022
- Current team: TGR Team Deloitte TOM'S
- Categorisation: FIA Silver (2018); FIA Gold (2019–)
- Car number: 38
- Former teams: TGR Team au TOM'S
- Starts: 40
- Wins: 3
- Podiums: 5
- Poles: 1
- Fastest laps: 0
- Best finish: 5th in 2024

Previous series
- 2021–23 2021 2021 2019–20 2016–18 2015–16 2015: Super Formula Championship; Super GT GT300; Super Formula Lights; FIA Formula 2 GP3 Series; MRF Challenge; French F4 Championship

Giuliano Ryu Alesi (ジュリアーノ・リュウ・アレジ; born 20 September 1999) is a French professional racing driver. He is the son of French racing driver and Formula One Grand Prix winner Jean Alesi and Japanese actress and TV personality Kumiko Goto.

== Career ==
=== Karting ===
Born in Avignon, Alesi began karting in 2013 before competing in the KF3 category in 2013 where he finished 14th overall and the KFJ category in 2014 with Baby Race SRL, finishing 28th in the standings.

=== French F4 Championship ===
In March 2015, it was announced that Alesi would step up from karting to cars in the 2015 season. In the first race, he took pole position and took victory as well as setting the fastest lap. He secured two more victories and two junior victories and finished second in the junior category and fourth in the overall standings.

=== GP3 Series ===
==== 2016 ====
In December 2015, Alesi took part in GP3 post-season testing with Arden International and Jenzer Motorsport. That same month, it was announced that Alesi would race in the 2016 season. In February 2016, it was announced that Alesi would race with Trident. After several races at the back of the grid, he scored his first point in GP3 Series in the feature race of Spa-Francorchamps.

==== 2017 ====
Alesi remained in GP3 for the 2017 season, once again driving with Trident. Having scored his first podium at the Red Bull Ring, Alesi took victory in the Sprint race at Silverstone. He followed this up with another win in Hungary, with a third win coming at the round in Spa-Francorchamps. He ended up fifth in the standings, having taken more points from two of the final three events.

==== 2018 ====
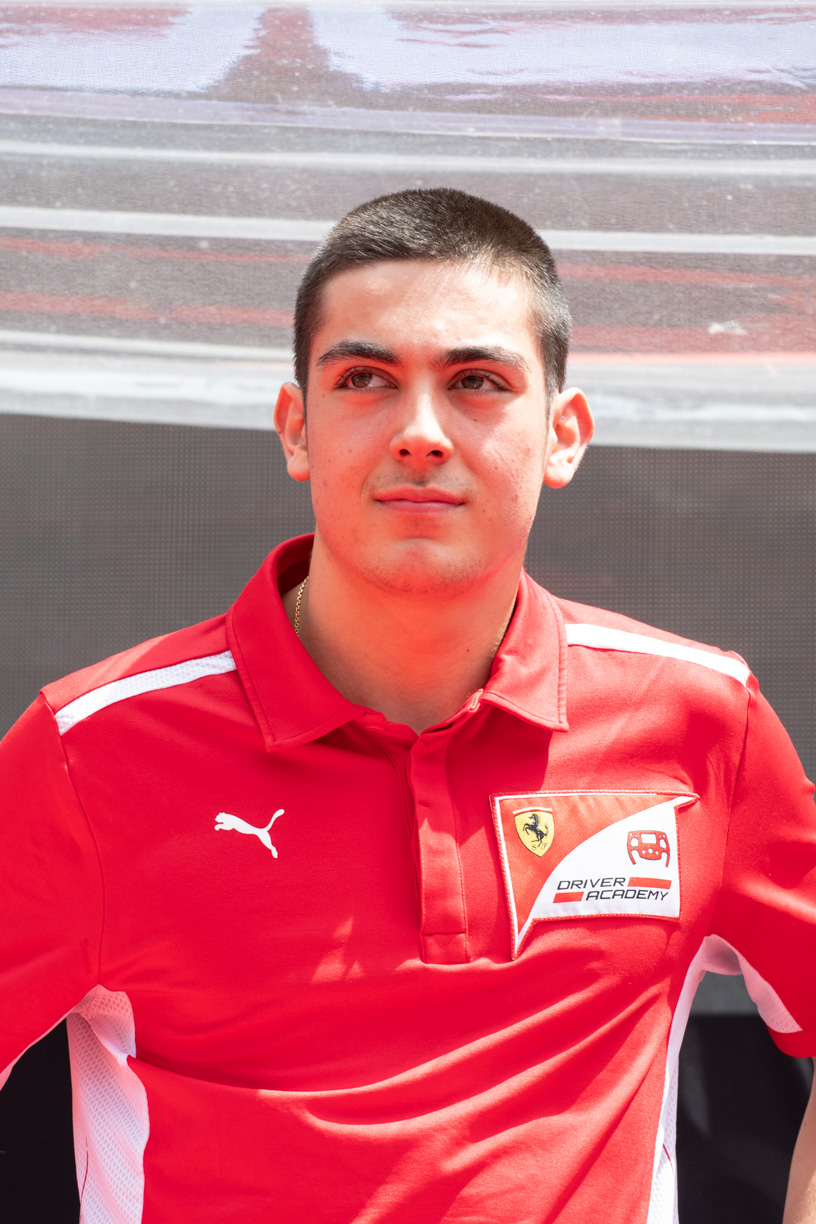
Alesi at the 2018 Spanish Grand Prix

In 2018, Alesi scored 100 points and finished seventh in the standings, only six points behind his Trident teammate, Pedro Piquet. Alesi won one race and finished on the podium on three other occasions.

=== FIA Formula 2 Championship ===
==== 2019 ====
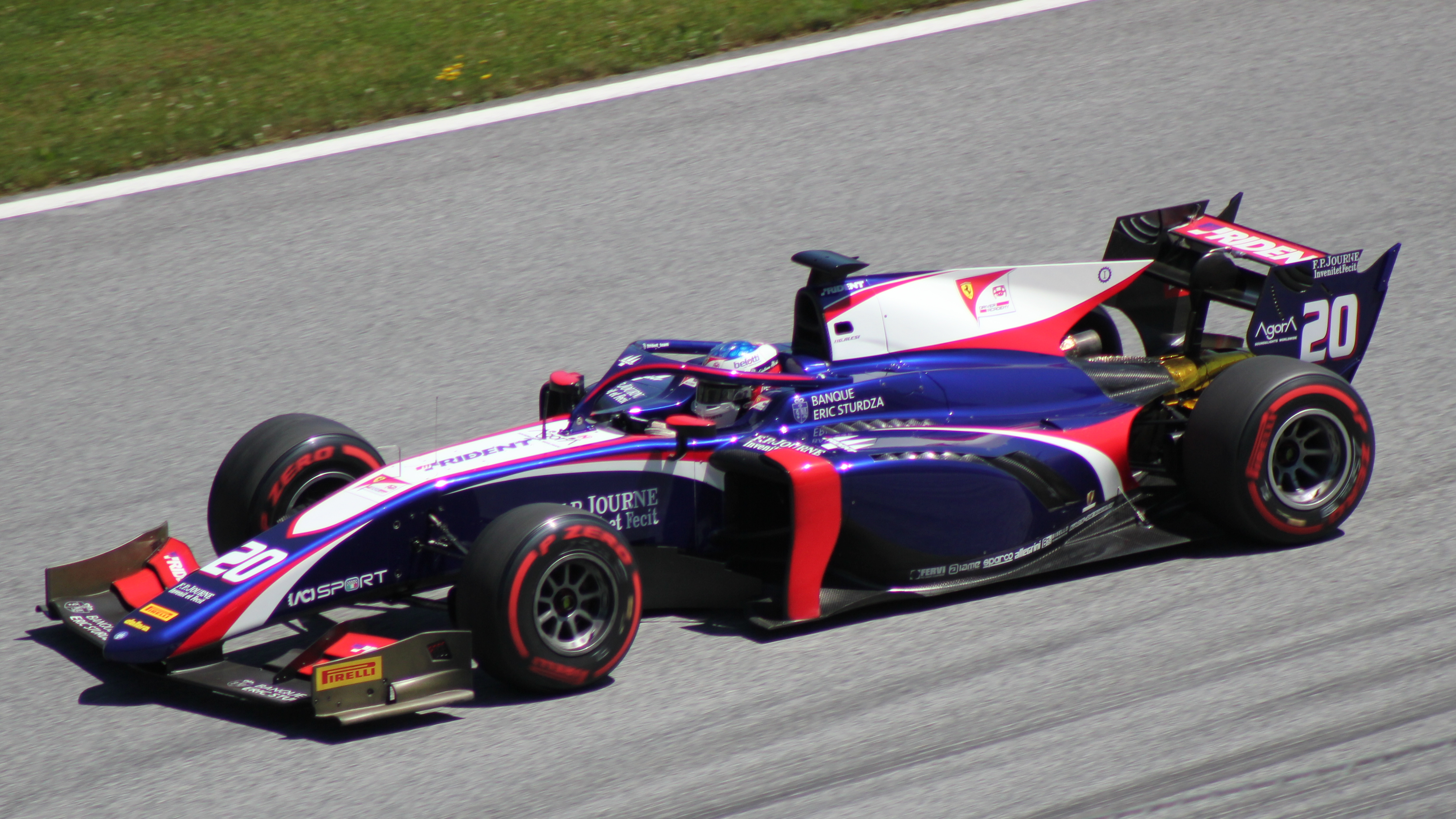
Alesi at the 2019 Spielberg Formula 2 round with Trident

On 8 December 2018, Trident Racing announced that Alesi would be driving for the team in the 2019 FIA Formula 2 Championship, alongside Ralph Boschung. Alesi had a slow start to the season, scoring only one point during the first half of the season, that being at the Paul Ricard feature race. From the event at Monza, however, he only failed to score points at the feature race in Sochi. He finished the season in 15th place, scoring 20 points; however, he could not prevent Trident from finishing last in the team championship.

==== 2020 ====
For the 2020 Formula 2 season, Alesi switched to his father's former DTM team HWA Racelab, driving alongside Artem Markelov. Despite a strong start to his season with a sixth place at the opening race in Austria, Alesi failed to score points with the team afterwards. As his father Jean later clarified, they had "banked on the wrong team", with the Frenchman eventually switching to MP Motorsport for the final three rounds. He finished his season by scoring another sixth place at the season finale, which landed him 17th in the championship.

=== Formula One ===
In March 2016, Alesi was inducted into the Ferrari Driver Academy (along with fellow GP3 driver Charles Leclerc), aligning him with the same team his father raced for in the early nineties. He left the academy after his first F1 test, in which he drove a Ferrari SF71H.

=== Super Formula Lights ===
After leaving the Ferrari Driver Academy, Alesi set his sights on Formula racing in Asia, and more specifically Super Formula Lights, where he was signed to TOM'S, alongside Japanese pair Kazuko Kotaka and Hibiki Taira. With four wins and fourteen podiums, Alesi clinched second in the championship, losing to Teppei Natori by six points.

=== Super Formula ===
Alesi made his debut in the Super Formula on 25 April 2021 filling in for Kazuki Nakajima in the TOM'S team; he would finish 11th in the series, getting a win at Autopolis, having converted it from a pole position. Alesi remained with TOM'S for 2022 and 2023 but was dropped by the team in June 2023 after a string of poor results; he was replaced by Ukyo Sasahara for the remaining rounds.

=== Super GT ===
==== GT300 ====
Alesi competed in Super GT with team Arto alongside Sean Walkinshaw in the GT300 category in 2021.

==== GT500 ====
Alesi was promoted to the GT500 category, joining 2021 champions Toyota Team au TOM'S alongside Sho Tsuboi; he replaced Yuhi Sekiguchi, who moved to SARD; the highlight of their season was a second in the first Fuji race, the race being stopped midway due to a heavy crash by Mitsunori Takaboshi. Alesi swapped seats with Ritomo Miyata for 2023, now racing alongside former Honda driver Ukyo Sasahara in the Deloitte car.

== Personal life ==
Giuliano Ryu Alesi was born on 20 September 1999 in Avignon, France. His father is a former professional racing driver Jean Alesi, and his mother is a Japanese model, actress, and former pop singer Kumiko Goto. He has three siblings: an older half-sister from his father's first marriage, his brother John, and younger sister Helena Alesi, who is also a fellow racing driver. Alesi is multilingual; he can speak English, French, Italian, and Japanese fluently.

== Karting record ==
=== Karting career summary ===
Season	Series	Team	Position
2013	Trofeo delle Industrie — KF3		14th
2014	Italian Championship — KF3		16th
2014	Andrea Margutti Trophy — KFJ	Baby Race Srl	28th

== Racing record ==
=== Racing career summary ===
Season	Series	Team	Races	Wins	Poles	F/Laps	Podiums	Points	Position
2015	French F4 Championship	Auto Sport Academy	21	3	2	2	4	168.5	4th
2015–16	MRF Challenge Formula 2000	MRF Racing	4	0	0	0	0	3	23rd
2016	GP3 Series	Trident	15	0	0	0	0	1	22nd
2017	GP3 Series	Trident	15	3	0	1	4	99	5th
2018	GP3 Series	Trident	18	1	0	1	4	100	7th
2019	FIA Formula 2 Championship	Trident	22	0	0	0	0	20	15th
2020	FIA Formula 2 Championship	BWT HWA Racelab	18	0	0	1	0	12	17th
2020	FIA Formula 2 Championship	MP Motorsport	6	0	0	0	0	12	17th
2021	Super Formula Lights	TOM'S	17	4	2	5	14	103	**2nd**
2021	Super GT - GT300	arto Team Thailand	8	0	0	0	0	0	NC
2021	Super Formula	Kuo Vantelin Team TOM'S	5	1	1	0	1	20	11th
2021	Super Taikyu - ST-Z	Porsche Team EBI Waimarama	1	0	0	0	0	52.5‡	7th‡
2022	Super Formula	Kuo Vantelin Team TOM'S	10	0	0	0	0	3	20th
2022	Super GT - GT500	TGR Team au TOM'S	8	0	0	0	1	29.5	10th
2022	Super Taikyu - ST-Z	Porsche Team EBI Waimarama	1	0	0	1	0	80‡	5th‡
2023	Super Formula	Vantelin Team TOM'S	5	0	0	0	0	3	20th
2023	Super GT - GT500	TGR Team Deloitte TOM'S	8	0	0	0	0	15	15th
2023	Super Taikyu - ST-Z	Porsche Team EBI Waimarama	1	0	0	0	0	50‡	8th‡
2024	Super GT - GT500	TGR Team Deloitte TOM'S	8	2	1	0	2	51	5th
2024	Super Taikyu - ST-X	Zhongsheng ROOKIE Racing	5	2	1	2	2	67‡	**1st‡**
2025	Super GT - GT500	TGR Team Deloitte TOM'S	8	1	0	0	1	49.5	6th
2025	Nürburgring Langstrecken-Serie - SP8T	Toyota Gazoo Racing							
2025	Nürburgring Langstrecken-Serie - SP8T	Toyo Tires with Ring Racing							
2025	Super Taikyu - ST-TCR	Waimarama Racing							
2025	Super Taikyu - ST-USA-2	TechSport Racing							
2026	Super GT - GT500	TGR Team Deloitte TOM'S	8	0	0	0	1	28	12th
2026	Nürburgring Langstrecken-Serie - SP10	Toyo Tires with Ring Racing							
2026	Nürburgring Langstrecken-Serie - SP9	Toyo Tires with Ring Racing							
2026	24 Hours of Le Mans - LMGT3	Team Qatar by Iron Lynx	1	0	0	0	0	N/A	16th
2026	Super Formula	KCMG	5	0	0	0	0	2	22nd*

^{*} Season still in progress.

‡ Team standings

=== Complete French F4 Championship results ===
(key) (Races in bold indicate pole position) (Races in italics indicate fastest lap)

Year	1	2	3	4	5	6	7	8	9	10	11	12	13	14	15	16	17	18	19	20	21	Pos	Points
2015	**LÉD**; **1**; 1	LÉD; 2 Ret	**LÉD**; **3**; 1	LMS; 1; 7	LMS; 2; 5	LMS; 3; 12	PAU; 1; 5	PAU; 2; 2	PAU; 3; 4	HUN; 1; 8	HUN; 2 Ret	HUN; 3; 6	MAG; 1; 12	MAG; 2; 5	MAG; 3 Ret	NAV; 1; 1	NAV; 2; 8	NAV; 3; 5	LEC; 1; 6	LEC; 2; 10	LEC; 3 Ret	4th	168.5

=== Complete GP3 Series results ===
(key) (Races in bold indicate pole position) (Races in italics indicate fastest lap)

Year	Entrant	1	2	3	4	5	6	7	8	9	10	11	12	13	14	15	16	17	18	Pos	Points
2016	Trident	CAT; FEA; 22	CAT; SPR; 16	RBR; FEA; DNS	RBR; SPR; DNS	SIL; FEA; 16	SIL; SPR; Ret	HUN; FEA; 19	HUN; SPR; 16	HOC; FEA; Ret	HOC; SPR; 14	SPA; FEA; 10	SPA; SPR; 12	MNZ; FEA; DNS	MNZ; FEA; 19	SEP; FEA; 16	SEP; SPR; 13	YMC; FEA; 11	YMC; SPR; 10	22nd	1
2017	Trident	CAT; FEA; 17	CAT; SPR; 11	RBR; FEA; 6	RBR; SPR; 2	SIL; FEA; 7	SIL; SPR; 1	HUN; FEA; 6	HUN; SPR; 1	SPA; FEA; 7	SPA; SPR; 1	MNZ; FEA; 6	MNZ; SPR; C	JER; FEA; 9	JER; SPR; 7	YMC; FEA; Ret	YMC; SPR; 10			5th	99
2018	Trident	CAT; FEA; 7	CAT; SPR; 1	LEC; FEA; 3	LEC; SPR; 6	RBR; FEA; 6	RBR; SPR; Ret	SIL; FEA; 8	SIL; SPR; 2	HUN; FEA; 17†	HUN; SPR; 16	SPA; FEA; 9	SPA; SPR; 6	MNZ; FEA; 6	MNZ; SPR; 2	SOC; FEA; 14	SOC; SPR; 17	YMC; FEA; 6	YMC; SPR; 10	7th	100

^{†} Driver did not finish the race, but was classified as he completed over 90% of the race distance.

=== Complete FIA Formula 2 Championship results ===
(key) (Races in bold indicate pole position) (Races in italics indicate points for the fastest lap of top ten finishers)

Year	Entrant	1	2	3	4	5	6	7	8	9	10	11	12	13	14	15	16	17	18	19	20	21	22	23	24	DC	Points
2019	Trident	BHR; FEA; 12	BHR; SPR; DSQ	BAK; FEA; Ret	BAK; SPR; Ret	CAT; FEA; Ret	CAT; SPR; 16	MON; FEA; 11	MON; SPR; Ret	LEC; FEA; 10	LEC; SPR; 14	RBR; FEA; 13	RBR; SPR; Ret	SIL; FEA; 17	SIL; SPR; Ret	HUN; FEA; 13	HUN; SPR; 12	SPA; FEA; C	SPA; SPR; C	MNZ; FEA; 7	MNZ; SPR; 7	SOC; FEA; 13	SOC; SPR; 8	YMC; FEA; 8	YMC; SPR; 5	15th	20
2020	BWT HWA Racelab	RBR; FEA; 6	RBR; SPR; Ret	RBR; FEA; 21	RBR; SPR; 15	HUN; FEA; 11	HUN; SPR; 10	SIL; FEA; 19	SIL; SPR; 18	SIL; FEA; 16	SIL; SPR; 20	CAT; FEA; Ret	CAT; SPR; 19	SPA; FEA; 18	SPA; SPR; 14	MNZ; FEA; 18	MNZ; SPR; 12	MUG; FEA; Ret	MUG; SPR; Ret							17th	12
2020	MP Motorsport																			SOC; FEA; 14	SOC; SPR; 16	BHR; FEA; 17	BHR; SPR; 13	BHR; FEA; 15	BHR; SPR; 6	17th	12

=== Complete Super GT results ===
(key) (Races in bold indicate pole position; races in italics indicate fastest lap)

Year	Team	Car	Class	1	2	3	4	5	6	7	8	9	DC	Points
2021	arto Team Thailand	Lexus RC F GT3	GT300	OKA; 24	FUJ; 22	MOT; Ret	SUZ; 20	SUG; 17	AUT; Ret	MOT; 17	FUJ; 20		36th	0
2022	TGR Team au TOM'S	Toyota GR Supra GT500	GT500	OKA; 6	FUJ; 2‡	SUZ; 10	FUJ; 4	SUZ; 9	SUG; 10	AUT; 8	MOT; 9		10th	29.5
2023	TGR Team Deloitte TOM'S	Toyota GR Supra GT500	GT500	OKA; 13	FUJ; 6	SUZ; 11	FUJ; 8	SUZ; 11	SUG; 10	AUT; 7	MOT; 9		15th	15
2024	TGR Team Deloitte TOM'S	Toyota GR Supra GT500	GT500	OKA; 7	FUJ; 11	**SUZ**; 1	FUJ; 10	SUG; 1	AUT; 8	MOT; Ret	SUZ; 11		5th	51
2025	TGR Team Deloitte TOM'S	Toyota GR Supra GT500	GT500	OKA; 5	FUJ; 7	SEP; 1	FS1 (3)	FS2; 7	SUZ; 12	SUG; 5	AUT; Ret	MOT; 5	6th	49.5
2026	TGR Team Deloitte TOM'S	Toyota GR Supra GT500	GT500	OKA; 14	FUJ; Ret	FUJ; 3	SUZ; 10	SUG; 5	AUT; 4	MOT; Ret	MOT; 9		12th	28

^{‡} Half points awarded as less than 75% of race distance was completed.
^{(Number)} Driver did not take part in this sprint race, points are still awarded for the teammate's result.

=== Complete Super Formula Lights results ===
(key) (Races in bold indicate pole position; races in italics indicate fastest lap)

Year	Entrant	1	2	3	4	5	6	7	8	9	10	11	12	13	14	15	16	17	18	DC	Points
2021	TOM'S	FUJ; 1; 3	FUJ; 2; 6	FUJ; 3; 3	SUZ; 1; 2	SUZ; 2; 3	SUZ; 3; 2	AUT; 1; 2	AUT; 2; 2	AUT; 3 C	**SUG**; **1**; 1	SUG; 2; 4	SUG; 3; 1	MOT; 1; 3	MOT; 2; 2	MOT; 3; 2	**MOT**; **1**; 1	**MOT**; **2**; 12	MOT; 3; 1	2nd	103

=== Complete Super Formula results ===
(key) (Races in bold indicate pole position; races in italics indicate fastest lap)

Year	Team	Engine	1	2	3	4	5	6	7	8	9	10	11	12	DC	Points
2021	Kuo Vantelin Team TOM'S	Toyota	FUJ	SUZ; 9	**AUT**; 1‡^{1}	SUG; 9	MOT; 16	MOT	SUZ; 8						11th	20
2022	Kuo Vantelin Team TOM'S	Toyota	FUJ; 17	FUJ; 8	SUZ; 15	AUT; Ret	SUG; 13	FUJ; Ret	MOT; 13	MOT; Ret	SUZ; 21	SUZ; 16			20th	3
2023	Vantelin Team TOM'S	Toyota	FUJ; Ret	FUJ; Ret	SUZ; 8	AUT; 13	SUG; Ret	FUJ	MOT	SUZ	SUZ				20th	3
2026	KCMG	Toyota	MOT	MOT	SUZ	SUZ	FUJ; 18	FUJ	FUJ; Ret	SUG; 19	FUJ; 16	FUJ; 9	SUZ	SUZ	22nd*	2*

^{‡} Half points awarded as less than 75% of race distance was completed.
^{*} Season still in progress.

=== Complete 24 Hours of Le Mans results ===
Year	Team	Co-Drivers	Car	Class	Laps	Pos.	Class Pos.
2026	Team Qatar by Iron Lynx	(Qatar) Abdulla Al-Khelaifi (Germany) Julian Hanses	Mercedes-AMG GT3 Evo	LMGT3	324	48th	16th
