= 2018 Silverstone GP3 Series round =

(United Kingdom) 2018 Silverstone GP3 round
Round details
- Round 4 of 9 rounds in the 2018 GP3 Series
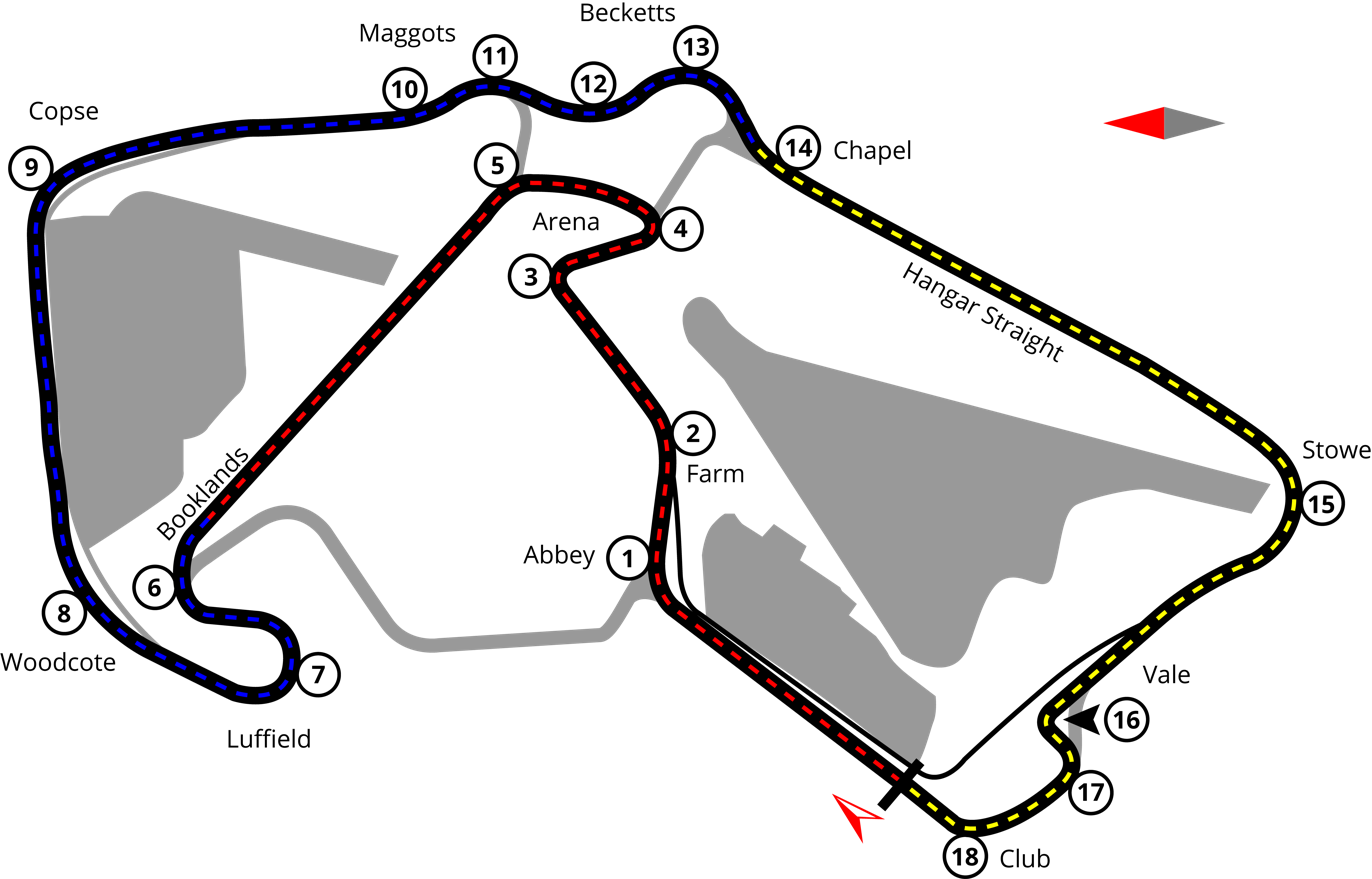
- Location: Silverstone Circuit, Silverstone, United Kingdom
- Course: Permanent racing facility 5.891 km (3.660 mi)

GP3 Series

Race 1
- Date: 7 July 2018
- Laps: 20

Pole position
Driver	(France) Anthoine Hubert	ART Grand Prix
- Time: 1:46.033

Podium
First	(France) Anthoine Hubert	ART Grand Prix
Second	(Russia) Nikita Mazepin	ART Grand Prix
Third	(United Kingdom) Callum Ilott	ART Grand Prix

Fastest lap
Driver	(United Kingdom) Callum Ilott	ART Grand Prix
- Time: 1:47.096 (on lap 19)

Race 2
- Date: 8 July 2018
- Laps: 15

Podium
First	(Brazil) Pedro Piquet	Trident
Second	(France) Giuliano Alesi	Trident
Third	(United States) Ryan Tveter	Trident

Fastest lap
Driver	(United Kingdom) Callum Ilott	ART Grand Prix
- Time: 1:47.821 (on lap 10)

The 2018 Silverstone GP3 Series round was the fourth round of the 2018 GP3 Series. It was held on 7 and 8 July 2018 at Silverstone Circuit in Silverstone, United Kingdom. The race supported the 2018 British Grand Prix.

== Classification ==
=== Qualifying ===
Pos.	No.	Driver	Team	Time	Gap	Grid
1	2	(France) Anthoine Hubert	ART Grand Prix	1:46.033		1
2	3	(Russia) Nikita Mazepin	ART Grand Prix	1:46.135	+0.102	2
3	6	(France) Giuliano Alesi	Trident	1:46.271	+0.238	3
4	1	(United Kingdom) Callum Ilott	ART Grand Prix	1:46.348	+0.315	4
5	7	(United States) Ryan Tveter	Trident	1:46.705	+0.672	5
6	8	(Italy) Alessio Lorandi	Trident	1:46.706	+0.673	6
7	22	(France) Dorian Boccolacci	MP Motorsport	1:46.710	+0.677	7
8	4	(United Kingdom) Jake Hughes	ART Grand Prix	1:46.712	+0.679	8
9	18	(Italy) Leonardo Pulcini	Campos Racing	1:46.790	+0.757	9
10	19	(Finland) Simo Laaksonen	Campos Racing	1:46.871	+0.838	10
11	5	(Brazil) Pedro Piquet	Trident	1:46.907	+0.874	11
12	20	(Mexico) Diego Menchaca	Campos Racing	1:46.987	+0.954	12
13	16	(Australia) Joey Mawson	Arden International	1:47.094	+1.061	13
14	15	(France) Julien Falchero	Arden International	1:47.145	+1.112	14
15	10	(United States) Juan Manuel Correa	Jenzer Motorsport	1:47.159	+1.126	15
16	11	(Germany) David Beckmann	Jenzer Motorsport	1:47.187	+1.154	16
17	9	(Colombia) Tatiana Calderón	Jenzer Motorsport	1:47.233	+1.200	17
18	23	(Canada) Devlin DeFrancesco	MP Motorsport	1:47.304	+1.271	18
19	24	(Finland) Niko Kari	MP Motorsport	1:47.311	+1.278	19
20	14	(France) Gabriel Aubry	Arden International	1:47.315	+1.282	20

=== Feature race ===
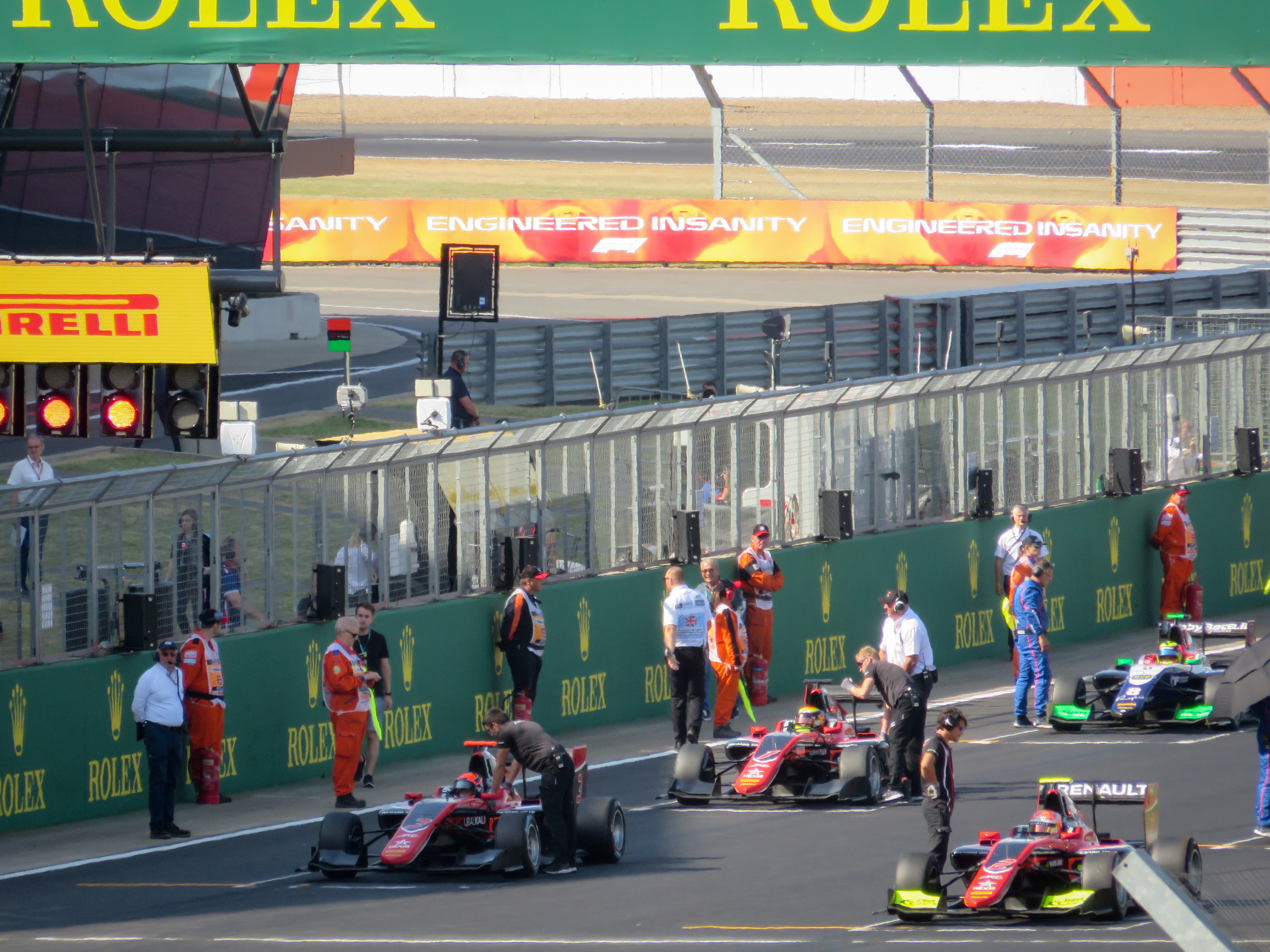

Pos.	No.	Driver	Team	Laps	Time/Retired	Grid	Points
1	2	(France) Anthoine Hubert	ART Grand Prix	20	39:40.023	1	25+4
2	3	(Russia) Nikita Mazepin	ART Grand Prix	20	+3.903	2	18
3	1	(United Kingdom) Callum Ilott	ART Grand Prix	20	+6.408	4	15+2
4	7	(United States) Ryan Tveter	Trident	20	+10.768	5	12
5	22	(France) Dorian Boccolacci	MP Motorsport	20	+15.035	7	10
6	18	(Italy) Leonardo Pulcini	Campos Racing	20	+18.048	9	8
7	5	(Brazil) Pedro Piquet	Trident	20	+19.736	11	6
8	6	(France) Giuliano Alesi	Trident	20	+21.281	3	4
9	16	(Australia) Joey Mawson	Arden International	20	+23.124	13	2
10	8	(Italy) Alessio Lorandi	Trident	20	+23.449	6	1
11	24	(Finland) Niko Kari	MP Motorsport	20	+24.283	19	
12	20	(Mexico) Diego Menchaca	Campos Racing	20	+24.972	12	
13	19	(Finland) Simo Laaksonen	Campos Racing	20	+26.739	10	
14	11	(Germany) David Beckmann	Jenzer Motorsport	20	+27.363	16	
15	23	(Canada) Devlin DeFrancesco	MP Motorsport	20	+28.852	18	
Ret	4	(United Kingdom) Jake Hughes	ART Grand Prix	12	Engine fail	8	
Ret	9	(Colombia) Tatiana Calderón	Jenzer Motorsport	3	Collision	17	
Ret	14	(France) Gabriel Aubry	Arden International	2	Collision	20	
Ret	15	(France) Julien Falchero	Arden International	0	Collision	14	
Ret	10	(United States) Juan Manuel Correa	Jenzer Motorsport	0	Collision	15	
Fastest lap: Callum Ilott − ART Grand Prix − 1:47.096 (on lap 19)

=== Sprint race ===
Pos.	No.	Driver	Team	Laps	Time/Retired	Grid	Points
1	5	(Brazil) Pedro Piquet	Trident	15	28:46.563	2	15
2	6	(France) Giuliano Alesi	Trident	15	+1.401	1	12
3	7	(United States) Ryan Tveter	Trident	15	+2.967	5	10
4	2	(France) Anthoine Hubert	ART Grand Prix	15	+3.503	8	8
5	1	(United Kingdom) Callum Ilott	ART Grand Prix	15	+3.900	6	6+2
6	18	(Italy) Leonardo Pulcini	Campos Racing	15	+9.356	3	4
7	3	(Russia) Nikita Mazepin	ART Grand Prix	15	+12.450	7	2
8	4	(United Kingdom) Jake Hughes	ART Grand Prix	15	+14.033	16	1
9	22	(France) Dorian Boccolacci	MP Motorsport	15	+14.676	4	
10	9	(Colombia) Tatiana Calderón	Jenzer Motorsport	15	+15.401	17	
11	20	(Mexico) Diego Menchaca	Campos Racing	15	+16.025	12	
12	8	(Italy) Alessio Lorandi	Trident	15	+18,222	10	
13	16	(Australia) Joey Mawson	Arden International	15	+18.915	9	
14	23	(Canada) Devlin DeFrancesco	MP Motorsport	15	+19.152	15	
15	10	(United States) Juan Manuel Correa	Jenzer Motorsport	15	+19.385	20	
16	19	(Finland) Simo Laaksonen	Campos Racing	15	+22.846	13	
Ret	24	(Finland) Niko Kari	MP Motorsport	12	Collision	11	
Ret	15	(France) Julien Falchero	Arden International	12	Collision	19	
Ret	14	(France) Gabriel Aubry	Arden International	11	Collision	18	
Ret	11	(Germany) David Beckmann	Jenzer Motorsport	11	Collision	14	
Fastest lap: Callum Ilott − ART Grand Prix − 1:47.821 (on lap 10)

== Standings after the event ==
Drivers' Championship standings

	Pos.	Driver	Points
1	1	(France) Anthoine Hubert	100
1	2	(United Kingdom) Callum Ilott	94
	3	(Italy) Leonardo Pulcini	73
	4	(Russia) Nikita Mazepin	71
1	5	(Brazil) Pedro Piquet	67

Teams' Championship standings

Pos.	Team	Points
1	(France) ART Grand Prix	300
2	(Italy) Trident	196
3	(Spain) Campos Racing	77
4	(Netherlands) MP Motorsport	42
5	(Switzerland) Jenzer Motorsport	26

- Note: Only the top five positions are included for both sets of standings.

== See also ==
- 2018 British Grand Prix
- 2018 Silverstone Formula 2 round

Previous round: 2018 Spielberg GP3 Series round	GP3 Series; 2018 season	Next round: 2018 Budapest GP3 Series round
Previous round: 2017 Silverstone GP3 Series round	Silverstone GP3 round	Next round: 2019 Silverstone Formula 3 round
