= 2018 Le Castellet GP3 Series round =

(France) 2018 Le Castellet GP3 round
Round details
- Round 2 of 9 rounds in the 2018 GP3 Series
- Location: Circuit Paul Ricard; Le Castellet, Var, France
- Course: Permanent racing facility 5.842 km (3.630 mi)

GP3 Series

Race 1
- Date: 23 June 2018
- Laps: 20

Pole position
Driver	(France) Dorian Boccolacci	MP Motorsport
- Time: 1:50.615

Podium
First	(France) Anthoine Hubert	ART Grand Prix
Second	(Russia) Nikita Mazepin	ART Grand Prix
Third	(France) Giuliano Alesi	Trident

Fastest lap
Driver	(France) Anthoine Hubert	ART Grand Prix
- Time: 1:52.551 (on lap 17)

Race 2
- Date: 24 June 2018
- Laps: 15

Podium
First	(United Kingdom) Callum Ilott	ART Grand Prix
Second	(Brazil) Pedro Piquet	Trident
Third	(Australia) Joey Mawson	Arden International

Fastest lap
Driver	(France) Anthoine Hubert	ART Grand Prix
- Time: 1:52.934 (on lap 15)

The 2018 Le Castellet GP3 Series round was a motor racing event held on 23 and 24 June 2018 at the Circuit Paul Ricard, Le Castellet, France. It was the second round of the 2018 GP3 Series, and ran in support of the 2018 French Grand Prix.

== Classification ==
=== Qualifying ===
Pos.	No.	Driver	Team	Time	Gap	Grid
1	22	(France) Dorian Boccolacci	MP Motorsport	1:50.615		1
2	2	(France) Anthoine Hubert	ART Grand Prix	1:50.697	+0.082	2
3	6	(France) Giuliano Alesi	Trident	1:50.708	+0.093	3
4	3	(Russia) Nikita Mazepin	ART Grand Prix	1:50.861	+0.246	4
5	18	(Italy) Leonardo Pulcini	Campos Racing	1:50.880	+0.265	5
6	24	(Finland) Niko Kari	MP Motorsport	1:50.900	+0.285	6
7	1	(United Kingdom) Callum Ilott	ART Grand Prix	1:50.904	+0.289	7
8	8	(Italy) Alessio Lorandi	Trident	1:51.108	+0.493	8
9	5	(Brazil) Pedro Piquet	Trident	1:51.134	+0.519	9
10	16	(Australia) Joey Mawson	Arden International	1:51.180	+0.565	10
11	23	(Denmark) Christian Lundgaard	MP Motorsport	1:51.266	+0.651	11
12	4	(United Kingdom) Jake Hughes	ART Grand Prix	1:51.308	+0.693	12
13	9	(Colombia) Tatiana Calderón	Jenzer Motorsport	1:51.338	+0.723	13
14	11	(Germany) David Beckmann	Jenzer Motorsport	1:51.409	+0.794	14
15	7	(United States) Ryan Tveter	Trident	1:51.450	+0.835	15
16	10	(United States) Juan Manuel Correa	Jenzer Motorsport	1:51.470	+0.855	16
17	19	(Finland) Simo Laaksonen	Campos Racing	1:51.614	+0.999	17
18	14	(France) Gabriel Aubry	Arden International	1:51.631	+1.016	18
19	15	(France) Julien Falchero	Arden International	1:51.758	+1.143	19
20	20	(Mexico) Diego Menchaca	Campos Racing	1:51.797	+1.182	20

=== Feature Race ===
Pos.	No.	Driver	Team	Laps	Time/Retired	Grid	Points
1	2	(France) Anthoine Hubert	ART Grand Prix	20	37:55.061	2	25 (2)
2	3	(Russia) Nikita Mazepin	ART Grand Prix	20	+4.361	4	18
3	6	(France) Giuliano Alesi	Trident	20	+8.333	3	15
4	18	(Italy) Leonardo Pulcini	Campos Racing	20	+10.919	5	12
5	8	(Italy) Alessio Lorandi	Trident	20	+13.706	8	10
6	5	(Brazil) Pedro Piquet	Trident	20	+19.413	9	8
7	16	(Australia) Joey Mawson	Arden International	20	+25.979	10	6
8	1	(United Kingdom) Callum Ilott	ART Grand Prix	20	+26.213	7	4
9	10	(United States) Juan Manuel Correa	Jenzer Motorsport	20	+27.125	16	2
10	4	(United Kingdom) Jake Hughes	ART Grand Prix	20	+27.418	12	1
11	7	(United States) Ryan Tveter	Trident	20	+27.483	15	
12	23	(Denmark) Christian Lundgaard	MP Motorsport	20	+27.529	11	
13	19	(Finland) Simo Laaksonen	Campos Racing	20	+41.869	17	
14	20	(Mexico) Diego Menchaca	Campos Racing	20	+42.332	20	
15	14	(France) Gabriel Aubry	Arden International	20	+43.203	18	
16	15	(France) Julien Falchero	Arden International	20	+47.372	19	
17	9	(Colombia) Tatiana Calderón	Jenzer Motorsport	20	+48.282	13	
18	11	(Germany) David Beckmann	Jenzer Motorsport	20	+1:02.380	14	
DSQ	22	(France) Dorian Boccolacci	MP Motorsport	20	Disqualified	1	(4)
DSQ	24	(Finland) Niko Kari	MP Motorsport	20	Disqualified	6	
Fastest lap: Anthoine Hubert − ART Grand Prix − 1:52.551 (on lap 17)

=== Sprint Race ===
Pos.	No.	Driver	Team	Laps	Time/Retired	Grid	Points
1	1	(United Kingdom) Callum Ilott	ART Grand Prix	15	28:35.270	1	15
2	5	(Brazil) Pedro Piquet	Trident	15	+3.491	3	12
3	16	(Australia) Joey Mawson	Arden International	15	+5.037	2	10
4	8	(Italy) Alessio Lorandi	Trident	15	+6.076	4	8
5	3	(Russia) Nikita Mazepin	ART Grand Prix	15	+6.799	7	6
6	6	(France) Giuliano Alesi	Trident	15	+7.045	6	4
7	2	(France) Anthoine Hubert	ART Grand Prix	15	+8.464	8	2 (2)
8	18	(Italy) Leonardo Pulcini	Campos Racing	15	+12.845	5	1
9	7	(United States) Ryan Tveter	Trident	15	+13.197	11	
10	11	(Germany) David Beckmann	Jenzer Motorsport	15	+14.474	18	
11	19	(Finland) Simo Laaksonen	Campos Racing	15	+17.604	13	
12	10	(United States) Juan Manuel Correa	Jenzer Motorsport	15	+21.339	9	
13	23	(Denmark) Christian Lundgaard	MP Motorsport	15	+22.040	12	
14	22	(France) Dorian Boccolacci	MP Motorsport	15	+22.222	19	
15	15	(France) Julien Falchero	Arden International	15	+23.587	16	
16	9	(Colombia) Tatiana Calderón	Jenzer Motorsport	15	+59.395	17	
17	4	(United Kingdom) Jake Hughes	ART Grand Prix	15	+1:14.335	10	
DNF	24	(Finland) Niko Kari	MP Motorsport	4	Puncture	20	
DNF	20	(Mexico) Diego Menchaca	Campos Racing	0	Accident damage	14	
DNF	14	(France) Gabriel Aubry	Arden International	0	Accident damage	15	
Fastest lap: Anthoine Hubert − ART Grand Prix − 1:52.934 (on lap 15)

== Standings after the event ==
Drivers' Championship standings

Pos.	Driver	Points
1	(France) Anthoine Hubert	63
2	(Russia) Nikita Mazepin	49
3	(France) Giuliano Alesi	42
4	(United Kingdom) Callum Ilott	36
5	(Italy) Leonardo Pulcini	29

Teams' Championship standings

	Pos.	Team	Points
	1	(France) ART Grand Prix	158
	2	(Italy) Trident	82
2	3	(Spain) Campos Racing	31
	4	(Netherlands) MP Motorsport	24
2	5	(Switzerland) Jenzer Motorsport	22

- Note: Only the top five positions are included for both sets of standings.

== See also ==
- 2018 French Grand Prix
- 2018 Le Castellet Formula 2 round

Previous round: 2018 Barcelona GP3 Series round	GP3 Series; 2018 season	Next round: 2018 Spielberg GP3 Series round
Previous round: None	Le Castellet GP3 round	Next round: 2019 Le Castellet Formula 3 round
