= 2018 Monza GP3 Series round =

Motor race competition in Monza, Italy

(Italy) 2018 Monza GP3 round
Round details
- Round 7 of 9 rounds in the 2018 GP3 Series
- Layout of the Autodromo Nazionale Monza
- Location: Autodromo Nazionale Monza, Monza, Italy
- Course: Permanent racing facility 5.793 km (3.600 mi)

GP3 Series

Race 1
- Date: 1 September 2018
- Laps: 22

Pole position
Driver	(Germany) David Beckmann	Trident
- Time: 1:37.959

Podium
First	(Germany) David Beckmann	Trident
Second	(France) Anthoine Hubert	ART Grand Prix
Third	(United Kingdom) Callum Ilott	ART Grand Prix

Fastest lap
Driver	(United States) Juan Manuel Correa (Note: Juan Manuel Correa set the fastest lap, but did not finish in the top 10, so was ineligible to be the point-scorer for the fastest lap. David Beckmann was the point-scorer instead for setting the fastest lap of those finishing in the top 10.)	Jenzer Motorsport
- Time: 1:43.797 (on lap 22)

Race 2
- Date: 2 September 2018
- Laps: 17

Podium
First	(Brazil) Pedro Piquet	Trident
Second	(France) Giuliano Alesi	Trident
Third	(Russia) Nikita Mazepin	ART Grand Prix

Fastest lap
Driver	(Russia) Nikita Mazepin	ART Grand Prix
- Time: 1:39.664 (on lap 8)

The 2018 Monza GP3 Series round was the seventh round of the 2018 GP3 Series. It was held on 1 and 2 September 2018 at Autodromo Nazionale Monza in Monza, Italy. The race supported the 2018 Italian Grand Prix.

== Classification ==
=== Qualifying ===
Pos.	No.	Driver	Team	Time	Gap	Grid
1	8	(Germany) David Beckmann	Trident	1:37.959		1
2	2	(France) Anthoine Hubert	ART Grand Prix	1:37.970	+0.011	2
3	18	(Italy) Leonardo Pulcini	Campos Racing	1:38.158	+0.199	3
4	10	(United States) Juan Manuel Correa	Jenzer Motorsport	1:38.181	+0.222	4
5	6	(France) Giuliano Alesi	Trident	1:38.203	+0.244	5
6	1	(United Kingdom) Callum Ilott	ART Grand Prix	1:38.255	+0.296	6
7	7	(United States) Ryan Tveter	Trident	1:38.289	+0.330	7
8	9	(Colombia) Tatiana Calderón	Jenzer Motorsport	1:38.333	+0.374	8
9	5	(Brazil) Pedro Piquet	Trident	1:38.408	+0.449	9
10	24	(Finland) Niko Kari	MP Motorsport	1:38.487	+0.528	10
11	3	(Russia) Nikita Mazepin	ART Grand Prix	1:38.586	+0.627	12
12	4	(United Kingdom) Jake Hughes	ART Grand Prix	1:38.620	+0.661	12
13	11	(Germany) Jannes Fittje	Jenzer Motorsport	1:38.748	+0.789	20
14	19	(Finland) Simo Laaksonen	Campos Racing	1:38.850	+0.891	13
15	16	(Australia) Joey Mawson	Arden International	1:38.896	+0.937	14
16	22	(Netherlands) Richard Verschoor	MP Motorsport	1:38.965	+1.006	15
17	14	(France) Gabriel Aubry	Arden International	1:39.035	+1.076	16
18	20	(Mexico) Diego Menchaca	Campos Racing	1:39.049	+1.090	17
19	15	(France) Julien Falchero	Arden International	1:39.109	+1.150	18
20	23	(Canada) Devlin DeFrancesco	MP Motorsport	1:39.635	+1.676	19

- Jannes Fittje was disqualified as there was not enough fuel in his car to produce sample for scrutineers.

=== Feature race ===
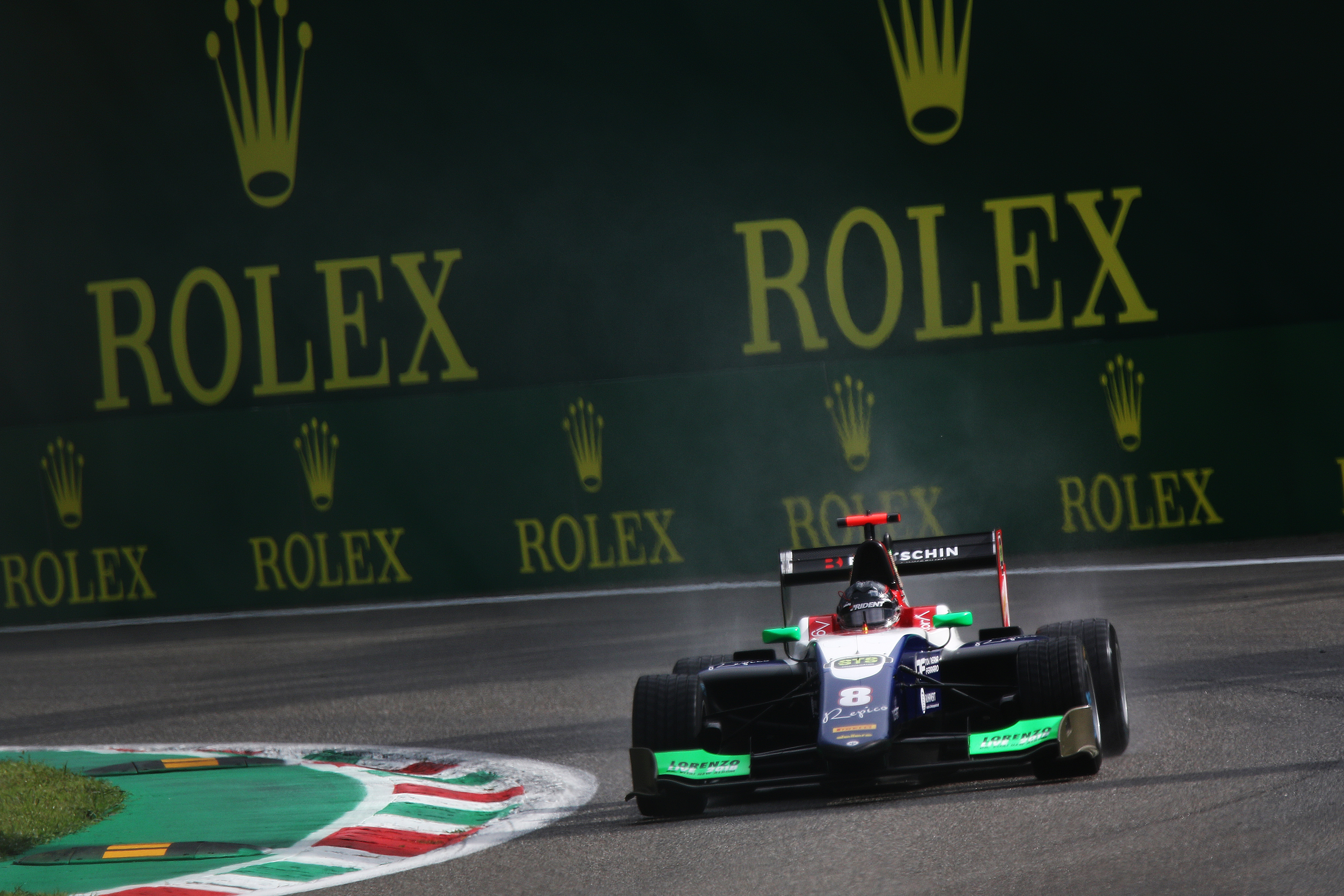
David Beckmann

Pos.	No.	Driver	Team	Laps	Time/Retired	Grid	Points
1	8	(Germany) David Beckmann	Trident	22	41:55.494	1	25+4
2	2	(France) Anthoine Hubert	ART Grand Prix	22	+6.018	2	18
3	1	(United Kingdom) Callum Ilott	ART Grand Prix	22	+13.789	6	15
4	19	(Finland) Simo Laaksonen	Campos Racing	22	+15.886	14	12
5	3	(Russia) Nikita Mazepin	ART Grand Prix	22	+16.559	11	10
6	6	(France) Giuliano Alesi	Trident	22	+17.034	5	8
7	5	(Brazil) Pedro Piquet	Trident	22	+23.042	9	6
8	22	(Netherlands) Richard Verschoor	MP Motorsport	22	+26.049	16	4
9	4	(United Kingdom) Jake Hughes	ART Grand Prix	22	+30.312	12	2
10	24	(Finland) Niko Kari	MP Motorsport	22	+34.788	10	1
11	7	(United States) Ryan Tveter	Trident	22	+40.236	7	
12	16	(Australia) Joey Mawson	Arden International	22	+40.396	15	
13	23	(Canada) Devlin DeFrancesco	MP Motorsport	22	+42.687	20	
14	18	(Italy) Leonardo Pulcini	Campos Racing	22	+43.391	3	
15	9	(Colombia) Tatiana Calderón	Jenzer Motorsport	22	+44.435	8	
16	11	(Germany) Jannes Fittje	Jenzer Motorsport	22	+56.185	13	
17	10	(United States) Juan Manuel Correa	Jenzer Motorsport	22	+1:16.194	4	
Ret	20	(Mexico) Diego Menchaca	Campos Racing	16	Collision	18	
Ret	15	(France) Julien Falchero	Arden International	15	DNF	19	
Ret	14	(France) Gabriel Aubry	Arden International	1	DNF	17	
Fastest lap: Juan Manuel Correa − Jenzer Motorsport − 1:43.797 (on lap 22)

=== Sprint race ===
Pos.	No.	Driver	Team	Laps	Time/Retired	Grid	Points
1	5	(Brazil) Pedro Piquet	Trident	17	33:01.677	2	15
2	6	(France) Giuliano Alesi	Trident	17	+0.419	3	12
3	3	(Russia) Nikita Mazepin	ART Grand Prix	17	+2.603	4	10+2
4	4	(United Kingdom) Jake Hughes	ART Grand Prix	17	+2.841	9	8
5	8	(Germany) David Beckmann	Trident	17	+3.382	8	6
6	9	(Colombia) Tatiana Calderón	Jenzer Motorsport	17	+6.756	15	4
7	18	(Italy) Leonardo Pulcini	Campos Racing	17	+9.071	14	2
8	19	(Finland) Simo Laaksonen	Campos Racing	17	+9.643	5	1
9	22	(Netherlands) Richard Verschoor	MP Motorsport	17	+10.153	1	
10	24	(Finland) Niko Kari	MP Motorsport	17	+12.260	10	
11	11	(Germany) Jannes Fittje	Jenzer Motorsport	17	+16.224	16	
12	16	(Australia) Joey Mawson	Arden International	17	+18.214	12	
13	15	(France) Julien Falchero	Arden International	17	+21.294	19	
14	20	(Mexico) Diego Menchaca	Campos Racing	17	+25.674	18	
15	23	(Canada) Devlin DeFrancesco	MP Motorsport	17	+35.571	13	
16	7	(United States) Ryan Tveter	Trident	17	+1:07.656	11	
Ret	14	(France) Gabriel Aubry	Arden International	0	Accident	20	
Ret	10	(United States) Juan Manuel Correa	Jenzer Motorsport	0	Accident	17	
DSQ	2	(France) Anthoine Hubert	ART Grand Prix	17	Disqualified	7	
DSQ	1	(United Kingdom) Callum Ilott	ART Grand Prix	17	Disqualified	6	
Fastest lap: Nikita Mazepin − ART Grand Prix − 1:39.664 (on lap 8)

== See also ==
- 2018 Italian Grand Prix
- 2018 Monza Formula 2 round

== Notes ==
Previous round: 2018 Spa-Francorchamps GP3 Series round	GP3 Series; 2018 season	Next round: 2018 Sochi GP3 Series round
Previous round: 2017 Monza GP3 Series round	Monza GP3 round	Next round: 2019 Monza Formula 3 round
