= 2018 Spa-Francorchamps GP3 Series round =

(Belgium) 2018 Spa-Francorchamps GP3 round
Round details
- Round 6 of 9 rounds in the 2018 GP3 Series
- Location: Circuit de Spa-Francorchamps, Stavelot, Belgium
- Course: Permanent racing facility 7.004 km (4.352 mi)

GP3 Series

Race 1
- Date: 25 August 2018
- Laps: 17

Pole position
| Driver | (Germany) David Beckmann | Trident |
- Time: 2:04.335

Podium
| First | (Germany) David Beckmann | Trident |
| Second | (United States) Ryan Tveter | Trident |
| Third | (France) Anthoine Hubert | ART Grand Prix |

Fastest lap
| Driver | (France) Anthoine Hubert | ART Grand Prix |
- Time: 2:07.684 (on lap 15)

Race 2
- Date: 26 August 2018
- Laps: 13

Podium
| First | (Russia) Nikita Mazepin | ART Grand Prix |
| Second | (France) Anthoine Hubert | ART Grand Prix |
| Third | (United Kingdom) Callum Ilott | ART Grand Prix |

Fastest lap
| Driver | (Russia) Nikita Mazepin | ART Grand Prix |
- Time: 2:06.738 (on lap 4)

The 2018 Spa-Francorchamps GP3 Series round was the sixth round of the 2018 GP3 Series. It was held on 25 and 26 August 2018 at Circuit de Spa-Francorchamps in Stavelot, Belgium. The race supported the 2018 Belgian Grand Prix.

== Classification ==
=== Qualifying ===
| Pos. | No. | Driver | Team | Time | Gap | Grid |
|---|---|---|---|---|---|---|
| 1 | 8 | (Germany) David Beckmann | Trident | 2:04.335 | | 1 |
| 2 | 2 | (France) Anthoine Hubert | ART Grand Prix | 2:04.479 | +0.144 | 2 |
| 3 | 5 | (Brazil) Pedro Piquet | Trident | 2:04.529 | +0.194 | 3 |
| 4 | 4 | (United Kingdom) Jake Hughes | ART Grand Prix | 2:04.530 | +0.195 | 4 |
| 5 | 3 | (Russia) Nikita Mazepin | ART Grand Prix | 2:04.538 | +0.203 | 5 |
| 6 | 1 | (United Kingdom) Callum Ilott | ART Grand Prix | 2:04.549 | +0.214 | 6 |
| 7 | 19 | (Finland) Simo Laaksonen | Campos Racing | 2:04.633 | +0.298 | 7 |
| 8 | 7 | (United States) Ryan Tveter | Trident | 2:04.677 | +0.342 | 8 |
| 9 | 6 | (France) Giuliano Alesi | Trident | 2:04.685 | +0.350 | 9 |
| 10 | 16 | (Australia) Joey Mawson | Arden International | 2:04.712 | +0.377 | 10 |
| 11 | 9 | (Colombia) Tatiana Calderón | Jenzer Motorsport | 2:04.804 | +0.469 | 11 |
| 12 | 18 | (Italy) Leonardo Pulcini | Campos Racing | 2:04.945 | +0.610 | 12 |
| 13 | 10 | (United States) Juan Manuel Correa | Jenzer Motorsport | 2:05.068 | +0.733 | 13 |
| 14 | 14 | (France) Gabriel Aubry | Arden International | 2:05.135 | +0.800 | 14 |
| 15 | 22 | (Netherlands) Richard Verschoor | MP Motorsport | 2:05.269 | +0.934 | 15 |
| 16 | 15 | (France) Julien Falchero | Arden International | 2:05.278 | +0.943 | 16 |
| 17 | 24 | (Finland) Niko Kari | MP Motorsport | 2:05.296 | +0.961 | 17 |
| 18 | 20 | (Mexico) Diego Menchaca | Campos Racing | 2:05.782 | +1.447 | 18 |
| 19 | 23 | (Canada) Devlin DeFrancesco | MP Motorsport | 2:05.974 | +1.639 | 19 |
| 20 | 11 | (Germany) Jannes Fittje | Jenzer Motorsport | 2:06.036 | +1.701 | 20 |

=== Feature race ===
| Pos. | No. | Driver | Team | Laps | Time/Retired | Grid | Points |
|---|---|---|---|---|---|---|---|
| 1 | 8 | (Germany) David Beckmann | Trident | 17 | 36:56.427 | 1 | 25+4 |
| 2 | 7 | (United States) Ryan Tveter | Trident | 17 | +1.363 | 8 | 18 |
| 3 | 2 | (France) Anthoine Hubert | ART Grand Prix | 17 | +2.027 | 2 | 15+2 |
| 4 | 5 | (Brazil) Pedro Piquet | Trident | 17 | +9.167 | 3 | 12 |
| 5 | 3 | (Russia) Nikita Mazepin | ART Grand Prix | 17 | +11.015 | 5 | 10 |
| 6 | 1 | (United Kingdom) Callum Ilott | ART Grand Prix | 17 | +13.392 | 6 | 8 |
| 7 | 4 | (United Kingdom) Jake Hughes | ART Grand Prix | 17 | +14.330 | 4 | 6 |
| 8 | 16 | (Australia) Joey Mawson | Arden International | 17 | +16.170 | 10 | 4 |
| 9 | 6 | (France) Giuliano Alesi | Trident | 17 | +17.015 | 9 | 2 |
| 10 | 9 | (Colombia) Tatiana Calderón | Jenzer Motorsport | 17 | +20.479 | 11 | 1 |
| 11 | 10 | (United States) Juan Manuel Correa | Jenzer Motorsport | 17 | +21.975 | 13 | |
| 12 | 19 | (Finland) Simo Laaksonen | Campos Racing | 17 | +25.071 | 7 | |
| 13 | 14 | (France) Gabriel Aubry | Arden International | 17 | +27.923 | 14 | |
| 14 | 24 | (Finland) Niko Kari | MP Motorsport | 17 | +29.176 | 17 | |
| 15 | 18 | (Italy) Leonardo Pulcini | Campos Racing | 17 | +30.302 | 12 | |
| 16 | 15 | (France) Julien Falchero | Arden International | 17 | +31.284 | 16 | |
| 17 | 22 | (Netherlands) Richard Verschoor | MP Motorsport | 17 | +36.065 | 15 | |
| 18 | 23 | (Canada) Devlin DeFrancesco | MP Motorsport | 17 | +37.632 | 19 | |
| 19 | 20 | (Mexico) Diego Menchaca | Campos Racing | 17 | +39.092 | 18 | |
| 20 | 11 | (Germany) Jannes Fittje | Jenzer Motorsport | 17 | +41.249 | 20 | |
Fastest lap: Anthoine Hubert − ART Grand Prix − 2:07.684 (on lap 15)

=== Sprint race ===
| Pos. | No. | Driver | Team | Laps | Time/Retired | Grid | Points |
|---|---|---|---|---|---|---|---|
| 1 | 3 | (Russia) Nikita Mazepin | ART Grand Prix | 13 | 27:45.477 | 4 | 15+2 |
| 2 | 2 | (France) Anthoine Hubert | ART Grand Prix | 13 | +1.840 | 6 | 12 |
| 3 | 1 | (United Kingdom) Callum Ilott | ART Grand Prix | 13 | +4.658 | 3 | 10 |
| 4 | 4 | (United Kingdom) Jake Hughes | ART Grand Prix | 13 | +9.338 | 2 | 8 |
| 5 | 5 | (Brazil) Pedro Piquet | Trident | 13 | +11.027 | 5 | 6 |
| 6 | 6 | (France) Giuliano Alesi | Trident | 13 | +12.104 | 9 | 4 |
| 7 | 22 | (Netherlands) Richard Verschoor | MP Motorsport | 13 | +19.250 | 17 | 2 |
| 8 | 7 | (United States) Ryan Tveter | Trident | 13 | +24.363 | 7 | 1 |
| 9 | 9 | (Colombia) Tatiana Calderón | Jenzer Motorsport | 13 | +24.751 | 10 | |
| 10 | 10 | (United States) Juan Manuel Correa | Jenzer Motorsport | 13 | +24.880 | 11 | |
| 11 | 14 | (France) Gabriel Aubry | Arden International | 13 | +26.476 | 13 | |
| 12 | 24 | (Finland) Niko Kari | MP Motorsport | 13 | +28.465 | 14 | |
| 13 | 19 | (Finland) Simo Laaksonen | Campos Racing | 13 | +32.841 | 12 | |
| 14 | 15 | (France) Julien Falchero | Arden International | 13 | +34.298 | 16 | |
| 15 | 11 | (Germany) Jannes Fittje | Jenzer Motorsport | 13 | +34.563 | 20 | |
| 16 | 20 | (Mexico) Diego Menchaca | Campos Racing | 13 | +36.020 | 19 | |
| 17 | 16 | (Australia) Joey Mawson | Arden International | 11 | +2 laps | 1 | |
| Ret | 23 | (Canada) Devlin DeFrancesco | MP Motorsport | 10 | DNF | 18 | |
| Ret | 18 | (Italy) Leonardo Pulcini | Campos Racing | 7 | DNF | 15 | |
| Ret | 8 | (Germany) David Beckmann | Jenzer Motorsport | 0 | DNF | 8 | |
Fastest lap: Nikita Mazepin − ART Grand Prix − 2:06.738 (on lap 4)

== Standings after the event ==
Drivers' Championship standings

| | Pos. | Driver | Points |
|---|---|---|---|
| | 1 | (France) Anthoine Hubert | 158 |
| | 2 | (United Kingdom) Callum Ilott | 132 |
| 1 | 3 | (Russia) Nikita Mazepin | 125 |
| 1 | 4 | (Italy) Leonardo Pulcini | 99 |
| | 5 | (Brazil) Pedro Piquet | 85 |

Teams' Championship standings

| Pos. | Team | Points |
|---|---|---|
| 1 | (France) ART Grand Prix | 450 |
| 2 | (Italy) Trident | 294 |
| 3 | (Spain) Campos Racing | 105 |
| 4 | (Netherlands) MP Motorsport | 65 |
| 5 | (Switzerland) Jenzer Motorsport | 40 |

- Note: Only the top five positions are included for both sets of standings.

== See also ==
- 2018 Belgian Grand Prix
- 2018 Spa-Francorchamps Formula 2 round

| Previous round: 2018 Budapest GP3 Series round | GP3 Series; 2018 season | Next round: 2018 Monza GP3 Series round |
| Previous round: 2017 Spa-Francorchamps GP3 Series round | Spa-Francorchamps GP3 round | Next round: 2019 Spa-Francorchamps Formula 3 round |
