= 2018 Spielberg GP3 Series round =

Motor racing competition

(Austria) 2018 Spielberg GP3 round
Round details
- Round 3 of 9 rounds in the 2018 GP3 Series
- Location: Red Bull Ring, Spielberg, Austria
- Course: Permanent racing facility 4.318 km (2.683 mi)

GP3 Series

Race 1
- Date: 30 June 2018
- Laps: 24

Pole position
Driver	(United Kingdom) Callum Ilott	ART Grand Prix
- Time: 1:19.209

Podium
First	(United Kingdom) Callum Ilott	ART Grand Prix
Second	(Italy) Leonardo Pulcini	Campos Racing
Third	(Italy) Alessio Lorandi	Trident

Fastest lap
Driver	(Italy) Leonardo Pulcini	Campos Racing
- Time: 1:20.850 (on lap 7)

Race 2
- Date: 1 July 2018
- Laps: 18

Podium
First	(United Kingdom) Jake Hughes	ART Grand Prix
Second	(Brazil) Pedro Piquet	Trident
Third	(Italy) Leonardo Pulcini	Campos Racing

Fastest lap
Driver	(Italy) Leonardo Pulcini	Campos Racing
- Time: 1:20.275 (on lap 7)

The 2018 Spielberg GP3 Series round was the third round of the 2018 GP3 Series. It was held on 30 June and 1 July 2018 at Red Bull Ring in Spielberg, Austria. The race supported the 2018 Austrian Grand Prix.

== Classification ==
=== Qualifying ===
Pos.	No.	Driver	Team	Time	Gap	Grid
1	1	(United Kingdom) Callum Ilott	ART Grand Prix	1:19.209		1
2	4	(United Kingdom) Jake Hughes	ART Grand Prix	1:19.246	+0.037	2
3	8	(Italy) Alessio Lorandi	Trident	1:19.276	+0.067	3
4	18	(Italy) Leonardo Pulcini	Campos Racing	1:19.344	+0.135	4
5	3	(Russia) Nikita Mazepin	ART Grand Prix	1:19.351	+0.142	5
6	5	(Brazil) Pedro Piquet	Trident	1:19.400	+0.191	6
7	22	(France) Dorian Boccolacci	MP Motorsport	1:19.453	+0.244	7
8	7	(United States) Ryan Tveter	Trident	1:19.487	+0.278	8
9	14	(France) Gabriel Aubry	Arden International	1:19.502	+0.293	9
10	6	(France) Giuliano Alesi	Trident	1:19.549	+0.340	10
11	10	(United States) Juan Manuel Correa	Jenzer Motorsport	1:19.592	+0.383	11
12	19	(Finland) Simo Laaksonen	Campos Racing	1:19.606	+0.397	12
13	16	(Australia) Joey Mawson	Arden International	1:19.718	+0.509	13
14	11	(Germany) David Beckmann	Jenzer Motorsport	1:19.782	+0.573	14
15	20	(Mexico) Diego Menchaca	Campos Racing	1:19.807	+0.598	15
16	24	(Finland) Niko Kari	MP Motorsport	1:19.902	+0.693	16
17	9	(Colombia) Tatiana Calderón	Jenzer Motorsport	1:19.974	+0.765	17
18	15	(France) Julien Falchero	Arden International	1:19.995	+0.786	18
19	2	(France) Anthoine Hubert	ART Grand Prix	1:20.003	+0.794	19
20	23	(Canada) Devlin DeFrancesco	MP Motorsport	1:20.191	+0.982	20

=== Feature race ===
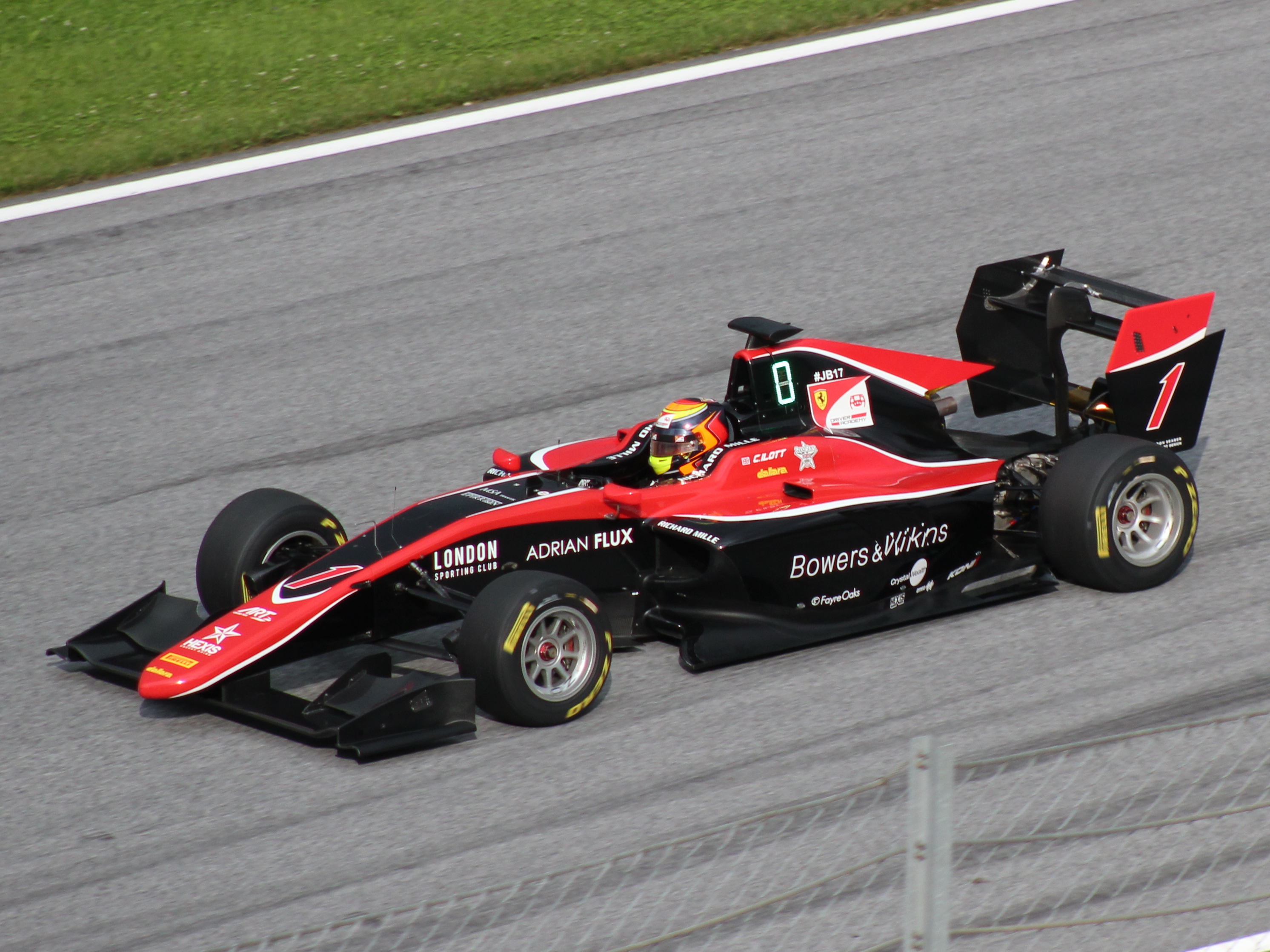
Callum Ilott

Pos.	No.	Driver	Team	Laps	Time/Retired	Grid	Points
1	1	(United Kingdom) Callum Ilott	ART Grand Prix	24	34:11.806	1	25 (4)
2	18	(Italy) Leonardo Pulcini	Campos Racing	24	+4.518	4	18 (2)
3	8	(Italy) Alessio Lorandi	Trident	24	+10.404	3	15
4	5	(Brazil) Pedro Piquet	Trident	24	+11.317	6	12
5	4	(United Kingdom) Jake Hughes	ART Grand Prix	24	+13.873	2	10
6	6	(France) Giuliano Alesi	Trident	24	+14.545	10	8
7	7	(United States) Ryan Tveter	Trident	24	+15.326	8	6
8	11	(Germany) David Beckmann	Jenzer Motorsport	24	+17.024	14	4
9	19	(Finland) Simo Laaksonen	Campos Racing	24	+18.946	12	2
10	22	(France) Dorian Boccolacci	MP Motorsport	24	+19.306	7	1
11	24	(Finland) Niko Kari	MP Motorsport	24	+20.069	16	
12	9	(Colombia) Tatiana Calderón	Jenzer Motorsport	24	+25.390	17	
13	3	(Russia) Nikita Mazepin	ART Grand Prix	24	+27.326	5	
14	20	(Mexico) Diego Menchaca	Campos Racing	24	+27.582	15	
15	15	(France) Julien Falchero	Arden International	24	+36.223	18	
16	14	(France) Gabriel Aubry	Arden International	24	+36.687	9	
17	2	(France) Anthoine Hubert	ART Grand Prix	24	+52.372	19	
18	23	(Canada) Devlin DeFrancesco	MP Motorsport	22	+2 laps	20	
19	10	(United States) Juan Manuel Correa	Jenzer Motorsport	22	+2 laps	11	
Ret	16	(Australia) Joey Mawson	Arden International	0	DNF	13	
Fastest lap: Leonardo Pulcini − Campos Racing − 1:20.850 (on lap 7)

=== Sprint race ===
Pos.	No.	Driver	Team	Laps	Time/Retired	Grid	Points
1	4	(United Kingdom) Jake Hughes	ART Grand Prix	18	25:23.065	4	15
2	5	(Brazil) Pedro Piquet	Trident	18	+0.821	5	12
3	18	(Italy) Leonardo Pulcini	Campos Racing	18	+1.784	7	10 (2)
4	8	(Italy) Alessio Lorandi	Trident	18	+2.202	6	8
5	22	(France) Dorian Boccolacci	MP Motorsport	18	+2.914	10	6
6	1	(United Kingdom) Callum Ilott	ART Grand Prix	18	+3.440	8	4
7	3	(Russia) Nikita Mazepin	ART Grand Prix	18	+5.061	13	2
8	24	(Finland) Niko Kari	MP Motorsport	18	+6.163	11	1
9	2	(France) Anthoine Hubert	ART Grand Prix	18	+6.634	17	
10	16	(Australia) Joey Mawson	Arden International	18	+7.682	20	
11	23	(Canada) Devlin DeFrancesco	MP Motorsport	18	+9.034	18	
12	9	(Colombia) Tatiana Calderón	Jenzer Motorsport	18	+12.396	12	
13	10	(United States) Juan Manuel Correa	Jenzer Motorsport	18	+16.335	19	
14	15	(France) Julien Falchero	Arden International	18	+16.942	15	
15	19	(Finland) Simo Laaksonen	Campos Racing	18	+18.437	9	
16	20	(Mexico) Diego Menchaca	Campos Racing	18	+22.620	14	
Ret	14	(France) Gabriel Aubry	Arden International	2	DNF	16	
Ret	11	(Germany) David Beckmann	Jenzer Motorsport	0	Collision	1	
Ret	6	(France) Giuliano Alesi	Trident	0	Collision	3	
Ret	7	(United States) Ryan Tveter	Trident	0	Collision	2	
Fastest lap: Leonardo Pulcini − Campos Racing − 1:20.275 (on lap 7)

== Standings after the event ==
Drivers' Championship standings

	Pos.	Driver	Points
3	1	(United Kingdom) Callum Ilott	69
1	2	(France) Anthoine Hubert	63
2	3	(Italy) Leonardo Pulcini	61
2	4	(Russia) Nikita Mazepin	51
2	5	(France) Giuliano Alesi	50

Teams' Championship standings

Pos.	Team	Points
1	(France) ART Grand Prix	218
2	(Italy) Trident	137
3	(Spain) Campos Racing	65
4	(Netherlands) MP Motorsport	32
5	(Switzerland) Jenzer Motorsport	26

- Note: Only the top five positions are included for both sets of standings.

== See also ==
- 2018 Austrian Grand Prix
- 2018 Spielberg Formula 2 round

Previous round: 2018 Le Castellet GP3 Series round	GP3 Series; 2018 season	Next round: 2018 Silverstone GP3 Series round
Previous round: 2017 Spielberg GP3 Series round	Spielberg GP3 round	Next round: 2019 Spielberg Formula 3 round
