= Simo Laaksonen =

Finnish racing driver

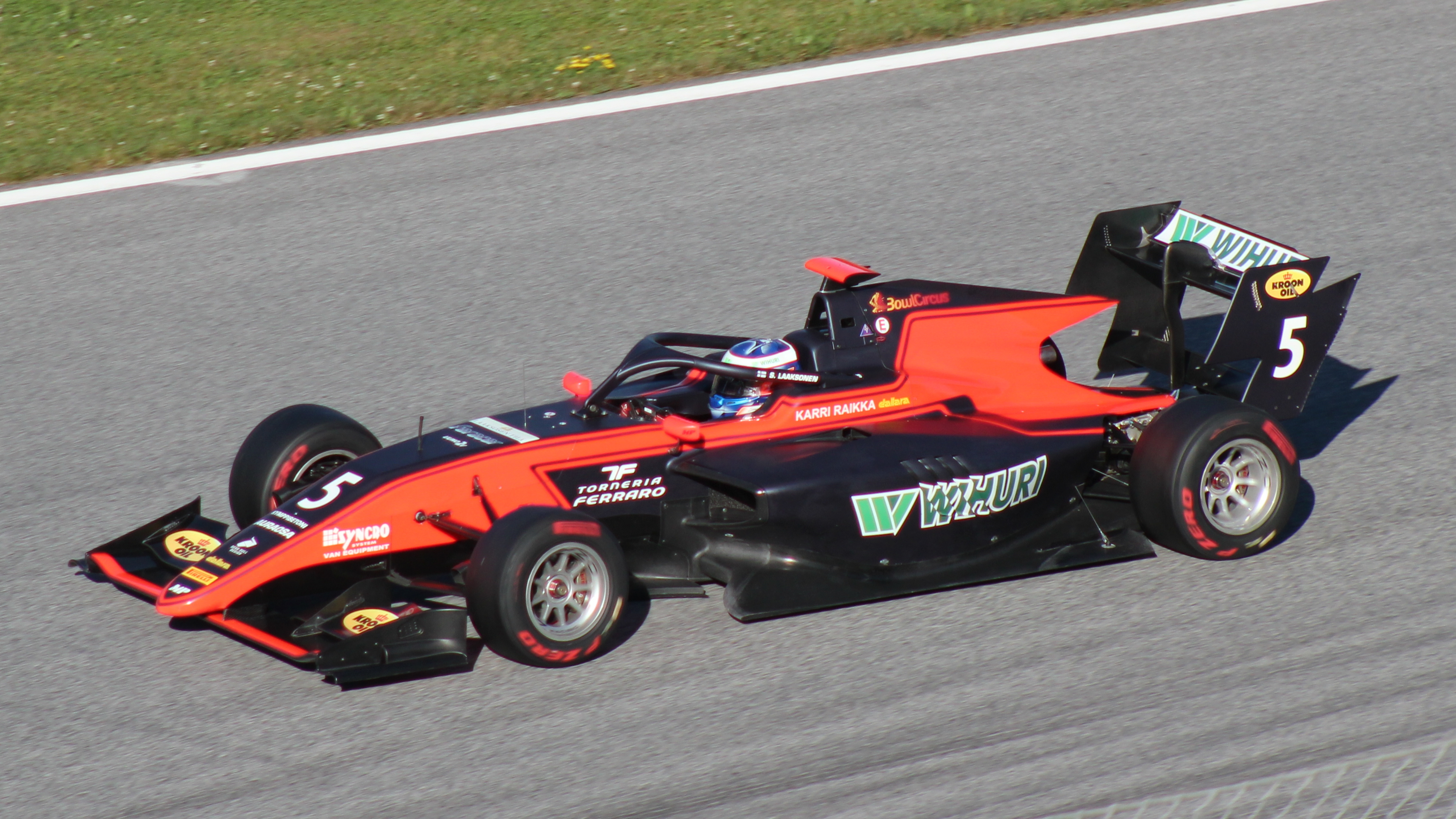
- Laaksonen driving the Dallara F3 2019 during the 2019 Spielberg Formula 3 round
- Nationality: Finnish
- Born: 10 September 1998 (age 28) Marttila, Finland

GP3 Series career
- Debut season: 2018
- Current team: Campos Racing
- Categorisation: FIA Silver
- Car number: 19
- Starts: 18
- Wins: 0
- Poles: 0
- Fastest laps: 0
- Best finish: 14th in 2018

Previous series
- 2014-2015 2015 2016 2017 2018: French F4 Championship; SMP F4 Championship; ADAC Formula 4 Euroformula Open Championship; GP3 Series

Simo Laaksonen (born 10 September 1998) is a Finnish former racing driver, who last competed for MP Motorsport in the 2019 FIA Formula 3 Championship.

== Racing record ==
=== Career summary ===
Season	Series	Team	Races	Wins	Poles	FLaps	Podiums	Points	Position
2014	French F4 Championship	Auto Sport Academy	21	0	0	0	1	31	17th
2015	French F4 Championship	Auto Sport Academy	21	1	0	1	3	150	6th
2015	SMP F4 Championship	Koiranen GP	12	0	0	0	0	60	11th
2016	ADAC Formula 4 Championship	Motopark	24	1	0	0	2	88	11th
2017	Euroformula Open Championship	Campos Racing	16	0	0	0	2	100	6th
2017	Spanish Formula 3 Championship	Campos Racing	6	0	0	0	0	70	**3rd**
2018	GP3 Series	Campos Racing	18	0	0	0	1	36	14th
2019	FIA Formula 3 Championship	MP Motorsport	16	0	0	0	0	2	23rd

=== Complete French F4 Championship results ===
(key) (Races in bold indicate pole position) (Races in italics indicate fastest lap)

Year	1	2	3	4	5	6	7	8	9	10	11	12	13	14	15	16	17	18	19	20	21	Pos	Points
2014	LMS; 1; 12	LMS; 2; 8	LMS; 3; 14	PAU; 1; 9	PAU; 2; 2	PAU; 3; 11	VDV; 1; 15	VDV; 2; 9	VDV; 3; 13	MAG; 1; 20	MAG; 2; 19†	MAG; 3; 19	NOG; 1; 17	NOG; 2; 12	NOG; 3; 18	JER; 1; 16	JER; 2; 22	JER; 3; 16	LEC; 1; 11	LEC; 2; 9	LEC; 3; 13	17th	31
2015	LÉD; 1; 13	LÉD; 2; 9	LÉD; 3; 9	LMS; 1; 5	LMS; 2; 3	LMS; 3 Ret	PAU; 1; 4	PAU; 2 Ret	PAU; 3; 6	HUN; 1; 6	HUN; 2; 4	HUN; 3; 7	MAG; 1; 6	MAG; 2; 1	MAG; 3; 6	NAV; 1; 11	NAV; 2; 12	NAV; 3; 9	LEC; 1; 4	LEC; 2; 9	LEC; 3; 2	6th	150

=== Complete SMP F4 Championship results ===
(key) (Races in bold indicate pole position) (Races in italics indicate fastest lap)

Year	1	2	3	4	5	6	7	8	9	10	11	12	13	14	15	16	17	18	19	20	21	Pos	Points
2015	AHV; 1	AHV; 2	AHV; 3	MSC1; 1	MSC1; 2	MSC1; 3	SOC; 1; 6	SOC; 2; 10	SOC; 3 Ret	ALA; 1; 11	ALA; 2; 5	ALA; 3; 6	AUD1; 1	AUD1; 2	AUD1; 3	MSC2; 1; 8	MSC2; 2; 8	MSC2; 3; 8	AUD2; 1; 7	AUD2; 2; 11	AUD2; 3; 7	11th	60

=== Complete ADAC Formula 4 Championship results ===
(key) (Races in bold indicate pole position) (Races in italics indicate fastest lap)

Year	Team	1	2	3	4	5	6	7	8	9	10	11	12	13	14	15	16	17	18	19	20	21	22	23	24	Pos	Points
2016	Motopark	OSC1; 1 Ret	OSC1; 2; 7	OSC1; 3; 22	SAC; 1; 8	SAC; 2; 12	SAC; 3; 2	LAU; 1 Ret	LAU; 2; 16	LAU; 3; 14	OSC2; 1; 7	OSC2; 2; 4	OSC2; 3 Ret	RBR; 1; 10	RBR; 2; 17	RBR; 3; 1	NÜR; 1; 9	NÜR; 2 Ret	NÜR; 3; 12	ZAN; 1 Ret	ZAN; 2; 12	ZAN; 3; 30	HOC; 1; 9	HOC; 2; 4	HOC; 3; 34	11th	88

=== Complete Euroformula Open Championship results ===
(key) (Races in bold indicate pole position) (Races in italics indicate fastest lap)

Year	Entrant	1	2	3	4	5	6	7	8	9	10	11	12	13	14	15	16	Pos	Points
2017	Campos Racing	EST; 1 Ret	EST; 2; 6	SPA; 1; 7	SPA; 2; 14	LEC; 1; 14	LEC; 2; 10	HUN; 1; 2	HUN; 2; 4	SIL; 1 Ret	SIL; 2; 11	MNZ; 1; 4	MNZ; 2; 3	JER; 1; 6	JER; 2; 6	CAT; 1; 11	CAT; 2; 8	6th	100

=== Complete GP3 Series/FIA Formula 3 Championship results ===
(key) (Races in bold indicate pole position) (Races in italics indicate fastest lap)

Year	Entrant	1	2	3	4	5	6	7	8	9	10	11	12	13	14	15	16	17	18	Pos	Points
2018	Campos Racing	CAT; FEA; 15	CAT; SPR; 8	LEC; FEA; 13	LEC; SPR; 11	RBR; FEA; 9	RBR; SPR; 15	SIL; FEA; 13	SIL; SPR; 16	HUN; FEA; 14	HUN; SPR; 11	SPA; FEA; 12	SPA; SPR; 13	MNZ; FEA; 4	MNZ; SPR; 8	SOC; FEA; 6	SOC; SPR; 14	YMC; FEA; 9	YMC; SPR; 3	14th	36
2019	MP Motorsport	CAT; FEA; 9	CAT; SPR; Ret	LEC; FEA; 20^{†}	LEC; SPR; Ret	RBR; FEA; 18	RBR; SPR; 18	SIL; FEA; 24	SIL; SPR; 24	HUN; FEA; 17	HUN; SPR; 18	SPA; FEA; 24	SPA; SPR; Ret	MNZ; FEA; 20	MNZ; SPR; 20	SOC; FEA; 17	SOC; SPR; Ret			23rd	2

^{†} Driver did not finish the race, but was classified as he completed over 90% of the race distance.
