= 2018 Sochi GP3 Series round =

2018 car race in Sochi, Russia

(Russia) 2018 Sochi GP3 round
Round details
- Round 8 of 9 rounds in the 2018 GP3 Series
- Location: Sochi Autodrom, Sochi, Russia
- Course: Permanent racing facility 5.848 km (3.634 mi)

GP3 Series

Race 1
- Date: 29 September 2018
- Laps: 20

Pole position
| Driver | (Italy) Leonardo Pulcini | Campos Racing |
- Time: 1:52.586

Podium
| First | (Italy) Leonardo Pulcini | Campos Racing |
| Second | (Russia) Nikita Mazepin | ART Grand Prix |
| Third | (France) Anthoine Hubert | ART Grand Prix |

Fastest lap
| Driver | (Russia) Nikita Mazepin | ART Grand Prix |
- Time: 1:56.004 (on lap 16)

Race 2
- Date: 30 September 2018
- Laps: 15

Podium
| First | (Germany) David Beckmann | Trident |
| Second | (Australia) Joey Mawson | Arden International |
| Third | (Netherlands) Richard Verschoor | MP Motorsport |

Fastest lap
| Driver | (United Kingdom) Jake Hughes (Note: Jake Hughes set the fastest lap, but did not finish in the top 10, so was ineligible to be the point-scorer for the fastest lap. David Beckmann was the point-scorer instead for setting the fastest lap of those finishing in the top 10.) | ART Grand Prix |
- Time: 1:55.087 (on lap 7)

The 2018 Sochi GP3 Series round was the eighth and penultimate round of the 2018 GP3 Series. It was held on 29 and 30 September 2018 at Sochi Autodrom in Sochi, Russia. The race supported the 2018 Russian Grand Prix.

== Classification ==
=== Qualifying ===
| Pos. | No. | Driver | Team | Time | Gap | Grid |
|---|---|---|---|---|---|---|
| 1 | 18 | (Italy) Leonardo Pulcini | Campos Racing | 1:52.586 | | 1 |
| 2 | 1 | (United Kingdom) Callum Ilott | ART Grand Prix | 1:52.655 | +0.069 | 2 |
| 3 | 6 | (France) Giuliano Alesi | Trident | 1:52.664 | +0.078 | 3 |
| 4 | 2 | (France) Anthoine Hubert | ART Grand Prix | 1:52.798 | +0.212 | 4 |
| 5 | 7 | (United States) Ryan Tveter | Trident | 1:52.826 | +0.240 | 5 |
| 6 | 19 | (Finland) Simo Laaksonen | Campos Racing | 1:52.844 | +0.258 | 6 |
| 7 | 22 | (Netherlands) Richard Verschoor | MP Motorsport | 1:52.865 | +0.279 | 7 |
| 8 | 3 | (Russia) Nikita Mazepin | ART Grand Prix | 1:52.951 | +0.365 | 8 |
| 9 | 16 | (Australia) Joey Mawson | Arden International | 1:53.178 | +0.592 | 9 |
| 10 | 4 | (United Kingdom) Jake Hughes | ART Grand Prix | 1:53.218 | +0.632 | 10 |
| 11 | 5 | (Brazil) Pedro Piquet | Trident | 1:53.262 | +0.676 | 11 |
| 12 | 10 | (United States) Juan Manuel Correa | Jenzer Motorsport | 1:53.362 | +0.776 | 12 |
| 13 | 15 | (France) Sacha Fenestraz | Arden International | 1:53.435 | +0.849 | 13 |
| 14 | 9 | (Colombia) Tatiana Calderón | Jenzer Motorsport | 1:53.661 | +1.075 | 14 |
| 15 | 8 | (Germany) David Beckmann | Trident | 1:53.765 | +1.179 | 15 |
| 16 | 23 | (Canada) Devlin DeFrancesco | MP Motorsport | 1:53.992 | +1.406 | 16 |
| 17 | 14 | (France) Gabriel Aubry | Arden International | 1:54.007 | +1.421 | 17 |
| 18 | 20 | (Mexico) Diego Menchaca | Campos Racing | 1:54.614 | +2.028 | 18 |
| 19 | 11 | (Germany) Jannes Fittje | Jenzer Motorsport | 1:54.846 | +2.260 | 19 |

- Nikita Mazepin recorded the fastest time in qualifying, a 1:52.569, but it was deleted for track limits.

=== Race 1 ===
| Pos. | No. | Driver | Team | Laps | Time/Retired | Grid | Points |
|---|---|---|---|---|---|---|---|
| 1 | 18 | (Italy) Leonardo Pulcini | Campos Racing | 20 | 38:56.960 | 1 | 25+4 |
| 2 | 3 | (Russia) Nikita Mazepin | ART Grand Prix | 20 | +3.955 | 8 | 18+2 |
| 3 | 2 | (France) Anthoine Hubert | ART Grand Prix | 20 | +7.037 | 4 | 15 |
| 4 | 22 | (Netherlands) Richard Verschoor | MP Motorsport | 20 | +8.314 | 7 | 12 |
| 5 | 8 | (Germany) David Beckmann | Trident | 20 | +12.631 | 15 | 10 |
| 6 | 19 | (Finland) Simo Laaksonen | Campos Racing | 20 | +13.442 | 6 | 8 |
| 7 | 4 | (United Kingdom) Jake Hughes | ART Grand Prix | 20 | +14.198 | 10 | 6 |
| 8 | 16 | (Australia) Joey Mawson | Arden International | 20 | +24.084 | 9 | 4 |
| 9 | 10 | (United States) Juan Manuel Correa | Jenzer Motorsport | 20 | +25.503 | 12 | 2 |
| 10 | 9 | (Colombia) Tatiana Calderón | Jenzer Motorsport | 20 | +31.565 | 14 | 1 |
| 11 | 14 | (France) Gabriel Aubry | Arden International | 20 | +31.973 | 17 | |
| 12 | 11 | (Germany) Jannes Fittje | Jenzer Motorsport | 20 | +33.156 | 19 | |
| 13 | 1 | (United Kingdom) Callum Ilott | ART Grand Prix | 20 | +35.793 | 2 | |
| 14 | 6 | (France) Giuliano Alesi | Trident | 20 | +36.222 | 3 | |
| 15 | 5 | (Brazil) Pedro Piquet | Trident | 20 | +37.714 | 11 | |
| 16 | 15 | (France) Sacha Fenestraz | Arden International | 20 | +38.412 | 13 | |
| 17 | 23 | (Canada) Devlin DeFrancesco | MP Motorsport | 20 | +39.357 | 16 | |
| 18 | 7 | (United States) Ryan Tveter | Trident | 19 | DNF | 5 | |
| Ret | 20 | (Mexico) Diego Menchaca | Campos Racing | 0 | DNF | 18 | |
Fastest lap: Nikita Mazepin − ART Grand Prix − 1:56.004 (on lap 16)

=== Race 2 ===
| Pos. | No. | Driver | Team | Laps | Time/Retired | Grid | Points |
|---|---|---|---|---|---|---|---|
| 1 | 8 | (Germany) David Beckmann | Trident | 15 | 29:43.318 | 4 | 15+2 |
| 2 | 16 | (Australia) Joey Mawson | Arden International | 15 | +0.617 | 1 | 12 |
| 3 | 22 | (Netherlands) Richard Verschoor | MP Motorsport | 15 | +1.056 | 5 | 10 |
| 4 | 2 | (France) Anthoine Hubert | ART Grand Prix | 15 | +4.559 | 6 | 8 |
| 5 | 10 | (United States) Juan Manuel Correa | Jenzer Motorsport | 15 | +5.736 | 9 | 6 |
| 6 | 14 | (France) Gabriel Aubry | Arden International | 15 | +10.464 | 11 | 4 |
| 7 | 9 | (Colombia) Tatiana Calderón | Jenzer Motorsport | 15 | +11.292 | 10 | 2 |
| 8 | 18 | (Italy) Leonardo Pulcini | Campos Racing | 15 | +11.852 | 8 | 1 |
| 9 | 7 | (United States) Ryan Tveter | Trident | 15 | +13.204 | 18 | |
| 10 | 11 | (Germany) Jannes Fittje | Jenzer Motorsport | 15 | +14.719 | 12 | |
| 11 | 5 | (Brazil) Pedro Piquet | Trident | 15 | +15.175 | 15 | |
| 12 | 23 | (Canada) Devlin DeFrancesco | MP Motorsport | 15 | +20.866 | 17 | |
| 13 | 15 | (France) Sacha Fenestraz | Arden International | 15 | +25.386 | 16 | |
| 14 | 19 | (Finland) Simo Laaksonen | Campos Racing | 15 | +25.963 | 3 | |
| 15 | 20 | (Mexico) Diego Menchaca | Campos Racing | 15 | +26.442 | 19 | |
| 16 | 4 | (United Kingdom) Jake Hughes | ART Grand Prix | 15 | +57.406 | 2 | |
| 17 | 6 | (France) Giuliano Alesi | Trident | 15 | +1:40.305 | 14 | |
| 18 | 1 | (United Kingdom) Callum Ilott | ART Grand Prix | 14 | +1 Lap | 13 | |
| Ret | 3 | (Russia) Nikita Mazepin | ART Grand Prix | 12 | Accident | 7 | |
Fastest lap: Jake Hughes − ART Grand Prix − 1:55.087 (on lap 7)

== See also ==
- 2018 Russian Grand Prix
- 2018 Sochi Formula 2 round

== Notes ==
| Previous round: 2018 Monza GP3 Series round | GP3 Series; 2018 season | Next round: 2018 Yas Marina GP3 Series round |
| Previous round: 2015 Sochi GP3 Series round | Sochi GP3 round | Next round: 2019 Sochi Formula 3 round |
