= 2019 Silverstone Formula 3 round =

(United Kingdom) 2019 Silverstone Formula 3 round
Round details
- Round 4 of 8 in the 2019 FIA Formula 3 Championship.
- Layout of the Silverstone Circuit
- Location: Silverstone Circuit; Towchester, United Kingdom
- Course: Permanent racing facility 5.891 km (3.66 mi)

Race 1
- Date: 13 July 2019
- Laps: 20
Pole position
Driver	(Estonia) Jüri Vips	Hitech Grand Prix
Time	1:43.902	
Podium
First	(Estonia) Jüri Vips	Hitech Grand Prix
Second	(India) Jehan Daruvala	Prema Racing
Third	(New Zealand) Marcus Armstrong	Prema Racing
Fastest lap
Driver	(United States) Logan Sargeant	Carlin Buzz Racing
- Time: 1:45.692 (on lap 16)

Race 2
- Date: 14 July 2019
- Laps: 20
Podium
First	(Italy) Leonardo Pulcini	Hitech Grand Prix
Second	(Russia) Robert Shwartzman	Prema Racing
Third	(New Zealand) Liam Lawson	MP Motorsport
Fastest lap
Driver	(Russia) Robert Shwartzman	Prema Racing
- Time: 1:46.203 (on lap 19)

The 2019 Silverstone FIA Formula 3 round was a motor racing event held on 13 and 14 July 2019 at the Silverstone Circuit, Towcester, United Kingdom. It was the fourth round of the 2019 FIA Formula 3 Championship, and ran in support of the 2019 British Grand Prix

== Classification ==
=== Qualifying ===
The Qualifying session took place on 12 July 2019, with Jüri Vips scoring pole position.

Pos.	No.	Driver	Team	Time/Gap	Grid
1	21	(Estonia) Jüri Vips	Hitech Grand Prix	1:43.902	1
2	26	(New Zealand) Marcus Armstrong	Prema Racing	+0.096	2
3	27	(India) Jehan Daruvala	Prema Racing	+0.112	3
4	3	(Denmark) Christian Lundgaard	ART Grand Prix	+0.171	4
5	20	(Italy) Leonardo Pulcini	Hitech Grand Prix	+0.237	5
6	28	(Russia) Robert Shwartzman	Prema Racing	+0.316	6
7	4	(New Zealand) Liam Lawson	MP Motorsport	+0.458	7
8	18	(Brazil) Pedro Piquet	Trident	+0.501	8
9	8	(Switzerland) Fabio Scherer	Sauber Junior Team by Charouz	+0.531	9
10	22	(China) Ye Yifei	Hitech Grand Prix	+0.559	10
11	11	(United Kingdom) Jake Hughes	HWA Racelab	+0.560	11
12	19	(Finland) Niko Kari	Trident	+0.574	12
13	1	(Germany) David Beckmann	ART Grand Prix	+0.679	13
14	2	(United Kingdom) Max Fewtrell	ART Grand Prix	+0.682	14
15	9	(United Kingdom) Raoul Hyman	Sauber Junior Team by Charouz	+0.745	15
16	31	(United States) Logan Sargeant	Carlin Buzz Racing	+0.844	16
17	7	(Germany) Lirim Zendeli	Sauber Junior Team by Charouz	+0.854	17
18	6	(Netherlands) Richard Verschoor	MP Motorsport	+1.065	18
19	25	(Spain) Sebastián Fernández	Campos Racing	+1.082	19
20	30	(Brazil) Felipe Drugovich	Carlin Buzz Racing	+1.118	20
21	23	(Australia) Alex Peroni	Campos Racing	+1.186	21
22	17	(Canada) Devlin DeFrancesco	Trident	+1.207	22
23	12	(Iran) Keyvan Andres	HWA Racelab	+1.208	23
24	5	(Finland) Simo Laaksonen	MP Motorsport	+1.240	24
25	10	(Netherlands) Bent Viscaal	HWA Racelab	+1.327	25
26	14	(Japan) Yuki Tsunoda	Jenzer Motorsport	+1.399	26
27	16	(Germany) Andreas Estner	Jenzer Motorsport	+1.533	27
28	29	(Japan) Teppei Natori	Carlin Buzz Racing	+1.688	28
29	15	(Italy) Federico Malvestiti	Jenzer Motorsport	+2.201	29
30	24	(Italy) Alessio Deledda	Campos Racing	+3.166	30

=== Race 1 ===
Pos.	No.	Driver	Team	Laps	Time/Retired	Grid	Pts.
1	21	(Estonia) Jüri Vips	Hitech Grand Prix	20	41:12.477	1	25 (4)
2	27	(India) Jehan Daruvala	Prema Racing	20	+0.811	3	18 (2)
3	26	(New Zealand) Marcus Armstrong	Prema Racing	20	+1.313	2	15
4	20	(Italy) Leonardo Pulcini	Hitech Grand Prix	20	+1.938	5	12
5	28	(Russia) Robert Shwartzman	Prema Racing	20	+2.236	6	10
6	18	(Brazil) Pedro Piquet	Trident	20	+5.301	8	8
7	3	(Denmark) Christian Lundgaard	ART Grand Prix	20	+6.835	4	6
8	4	(New Zealand) Liam Lawson	MP Motorsport	20	+7.106	7	4
9	11	(United Kingdom) Jake Hughes	HWA Racelab	20	+7.305	11	2
10	23	(Australia) Alex Peroni	Campos Racing	20	+8.316	21	1
11	1	(Germany) David Beckmann	ART Grand Prix	20	+8.836	13	
12	22	(China) Ye Yifei	Hitech Grand Prix	20	+9.262	10	
13	30	(Brazil) Felipe Drugovich	Carlin Buzz Racing	20	+11.261	20	
14	14	(Japan) Yuki Tsunoda	Jenzer Motorsport	20	+13.704	26	
15	7	(Germany) Lirim Zendeli	Sauber Junior Team by Charouz	20	+14.605	17	
16	8	(Switzerland) Fabio Scherer	Sauber Junior Team by Charouz	20	+15.933	9	
17	6	(Netherlands) Richard Verschoor	MP Motorsport	20	+18.527	18	
18	19	(Finland) Niko Kari	Trident	20	+19.339	12	
19	2	(United Kingdom) Max Fewtrell	ART Grand Prix	20	+19.845	14	
20	25	(Spain) Sebastián Fernández	Campos Racing	20	+20.055	19	
21	12	(Iran) Keyvan Andres	HWA Racelab	20	+20.569	23	
22	10	(Netherlands) Bent Viscaal	HWA Racelab	20	+21.268	25	
23	16	(Germany) Andreas Estner	Jenzer Motorsport	20	+21.519	27	
24	5	(Finland) Simo Laaksonen	MP Motorsport	20	+21.778	24	
25	29	(Japan) Teppei Natori	Carlin Buzz Racing	20	+21.944	28	
26	31	(United States) Logan Sargeant	Carlin Buzz Racing	20	+28.790	16	
27	17	(Canada) Devlin DeFrancesco	Trident	20	+55.456	22	
DNF	9	(United Kingdom) Raoul Hyman	Sauber Junior Team by Charouz	11	Accident	15	
DNF	15	(Italy) Federico Malvestiti	Jenzer Motorsport	7	Mechanical	29	
DNF	24	(Italy) Alessio Deledda	Campos Racing	7	Mechanical	30	
Fastest lap set by Jehan Daruvala: 1:45.698 (lap 17)

=== Race 2 ===
Pos.	No.	Driver	Team	Laps	Time/Retired	Grid	Pts.
1	20	(Italy) Leonardo Pulcini	Hitech Grand Prix	20	35:57.713	5	15
2	28	(Russia) Robert Shwartzman	Prema Racing	20	+2.692	4	12 (2)
3	4	(New Zealand) Liam Lawson	MP Motorsport	20	+9.718	1	10
4	26	(New Zealand) Marcus Armstrong	Prema Racing	20	+10.118	6	8
5	3	(Denmark) Christian Lundgaard	ART Grand Prix	20	+10.671	2	6
6	1	(Germany) David Beckmann	ART Grand Prix	20	+11.171	11	4
7	14	(Japan) Yuki Tsunoda	Jenzer Motorsport	20	+12.150	14	2
8	8	(Switzerland) Fabio Scherer	Sauber Junior Team by Charouz	20	+13.048	16	1
9	7	(Germany) Lirim Zendeli	Sauber Junior Team by Charouz	20	+14.018	15	
10	30	(Brazil) Felipe Drugovich	Carlin Buzz Racing	20	+14.857	13	
11	22	(China) Ye Yifei	Hitech Grand Prix	20	+16.744	12	
12	2	(United Kingdom) Max Fewtrell	ART Grand Prix	20	+17.488	19	
13	31	(United States) Logan Sargeant	Carlin Buzz Racing	20	+20.043	26	
14	25	(Spain) Sebastián Fernández	Campos Racing	20	+23.660	20	
15	21	(Estonia) Jüri Vips	Hitech Grand Prix	20	+25.332	8	
16	29	(Japan) Teppei Natori	Carlin Buzz Racing	20	+29.136	25	
17	17	(Canada) Devlin DeFrancesco	Trident	20	+29.899	27	
18	9	(United Kingdom) Raoul Hyman	Sauber Junior Team by Charouz	20	+30.123	28	
19	19	(Finland) Niko Kari	Trident	20	+30.779	18	
20	10	(Netherlands) Bent Viscaal	HWA Racelab	20	+30.967	22	
21	6	(Netherlands) Richard Verschoor	MP Motorsport	20	+32.930	17	
22	16	(Germany) Andreas Estner	Jenzer Motorsport	20	+33.087	23	
23	15	(Italy) Federico Malvestiti	Jenzer Motorsport	20	+36.223	29	
24	5	(Finland) Simo Laaksonen	MP Motorsport	20	+36.711	24	
25	24	(Italy) Alessio Deledda	Campos Racing	20	+44.287	30	
26	12	(Iran) Keyvan Andres	HWA Racelab	20	+62.568	21	
27	18	(Brazil) Pedro Piquet	Trident	19	Collision	3	
28	27	(India) Jehan Daruvala	Prema Racing	19	Collision	7	
DNF	11	(United Kingdom) Jake Hughes	HWA Racelab	17	Collision	9	
DNF	23	(Australia) Alex Peroni	Campos Racing	7	Mechanical	10	
Fastest lap set by Robert Shwartzman: 1:46.203 (lap 19)

== See also ==
- 2019 British Grand Prix
- 2019 Silverstone Formula 2 round

Previous round: 2019 Spielberg Formula 3 round	FIA Formula 3 Championship; 2019 season	Next round: 2019 Budapest Formula 3 round
Previous round: 2018 Silverstone GP3 Series round	Silverstone Formula 3 round	Next round: 2020 Silverstone Formula 3 round
