= 2019 Spa-Francorchamps Formula 3 round =

(Belgium) 2019 Spa-Francorchamps Formula 3 round
Round details
- Round 6 of 8 in the 2019 FIA Formula 3 Championship.
- Layout of the Circuit de Spa-Francorchamps
- Location: Circuit de Spa-Francorchamps; Stavelot, Belgium
- Course: Permanent racing facility 7.004 km (4.352 mi)

Race 1
- Date: 31 August 2019
- Laps: 17
Pole position
Driver	(India) Jehan Daruvala	Prema Racing
Time	2:05.125	
Podium
First	(Brazil) Pedro Piquet	Trident
Second	(Russia) Robert Shwartzman	Prema Racing
Third	(India) Jehan Daruvala	Prema Racing
Fastest lap
Driver	(Brazil) Pedro Piquet	Trident
- Time: 2:08.911 (on lap 4)

Race 2
- Date: 1 September 2019
- Laps: 17
Podium
First	(New Zealand) Marcus Armstrong	Prema Racing
Second	(Japan) Yuki Tsunoda	Jenzer Motorsport
Third	(Russia) Robert Shwartzman	Prema Racing
Fastest lap
Driver	(New Zealand) Marcus Armstrong	Prema Racing
- Time: 2:08.535 (on lap 2)

The 2019 Spa-Francorchamps FIA Formula 3 round was a motor racing event held on 31 August and 1 September 2019 at the Circuit de Spa-Francorchamps, Stavelot, Belgium. It was the sixth race of the 2019 FIA Formula 3 Championship, and ran in support of the 2019 Belgian Grand Prix.

== Classification ==
=== Qualifying ===
The Qualifying session took place on 30 August 2019, with Jehan Daruvala scoring pole position.

Pos.	No.	Driver	Team	Time/Gap	Grid
1	27	(India) Jehan Daruvala	Prema Racing	2:05.125	1
2	18	(Brazil) Pedro Piquet	Trident	+0.231	2
3	14	(Japan) Yuki Tsunoda	Jenzer Motorsport	+0.415	3
4	28	(Russia) Robert Shwartzman	Prema Racing	+0.480	4
5	11	(United Kingdom) Jake Hughes	HWA Racelab	+0.489	5
6	21	(Estonia) Jüri Vips	Hitech Grand Prix	+0.500	6
7	17	(Canada) Devlin DeFrancesco	Trident	+0.515	7
8	20	(Italy) Leonardo Pulcini	Hitech Grand Prix	+0.576	8
9	31	(United States) Logan Sargeant	Carlin Buzz Racing	+0.584	9
10	4	(New Zealand) Liam Lawson	MP Motorsport	+0.935	10
11	23	(Australia) Alex Peroni	Campos Racing	+1.062	11
12	2	(United Kingdom) Max Fewtrell	ART Grand Prix	+1.082	12
13	6	(Netherlands) Richard Verschoor	MP Motorsport	+1.130	13
14	3	(Denmark) Christian Lundgaard	ART Grand Prix	+1.145	14
15	22	(China) Ye Yifei	Hitech Grand Prix	+1.149	15
16	10	(Netherlands) Bent Viscaal	HWA Racelab	+1.164	16
17	1	(Germany) David Beckmann	ART Grand Prix	+1.208	17
18	15	(Switzerland) Giorgio Carrara	Jenzer Motorsport	+1.271	18
19	26	(New Zealand) Marcus Armstrong	Prema Racing	+1.275	19
20	29	(Japan) Teppei Natori	Carlin Buzz Racing	+1.295	20
21	19	(Finland) Niko Kari	Trident	+1.350	21
22	12	(Iran) Keyvan Andres	HWA Racelab	+1.412	22
23	30	(Brazil) Felipe Drugovich	Carlin Buzz Racing	+1.481	23
24	9	(United Kingdom) Raoul Hyman	Sauber Junior Team by Charouz	+1.489	24
25	25	(Spain) Sebastián Fernández	Campos Racing	+2.126	25
26	16	(Germany) Andreas Estner	Jenzer Motorsport	+2.350	26
27	5	(Finland) Simo Laaksonen	MP Motorsport	+2.378	27
28	8	(Switzerland) Fabio Scherer	Sauber Junior Team by Charouz	+2.889	28
29	7	(Germany) Lirim Zendeli	Sauber Junior Team by Charouz	+2.951	30
30	24	(Italy) Alessio Deledda	Campos Racing	+3.773	29

=== Race 1 ===
Pos.	No.	Driver	Team	Laps	Time/Retired	Grid	Pts.
1	18	(Brazil) Pedro Piquet	Trident	17	37:40.863	2	25 (2)
2	28	(Russia) Robert Shwartzman	Prema Racing	17	+2.222	4	18
3	27	(India) Jehan Daruvala	Prema Racing	17	+7.621	1	15 (4)
4	3	(Denmark) Christian Lundgaard	ART Grand Prix	17	+14.837	14	12
5	21	(Estonia) Jüri Vips	Hitech Grand Prix	17	+15.498	6	10
6	14	(Japan) Yuki Tsunoda	Jenzer Motorsport	17	+16.147	3	8
7	20	(Italy) Leonardo Pulcini	Hitech Grand Prix	17	+17.724	8	6
8	26	(New Zealand) Marcus Armstrong	Prema Racing	17	+18.661	19	4
9	2	(United Kingdom) Max Fewtrell	ART Grand Prix	17	+19.346	12	2
10	1	(Germany) David Beckmann	ART Grand Prix	17	+26.879	17	1
11	29	(Japan) Teppei Natori	Carlin Buzz Racing	17	+32.465	20	
12	4	(New Zealand) Liam Lawson	MP Motorsport	17	+33.181	10	
13	31	(United States) Logan Sargeant	Carlin Buzz Racing	17	+35.538	9	
14	12	(Iran) Keyvan Andres	HWA Racelab	17	+35.751	22	
15	22	(China) Ye Yifei	Hitech Grand Prix	17	+36.721	15	
16	15	(Switzerland) Giorgio Carrara	Jenzer Motorsport	17	+37.539	18	
17	6	(Netherlands) Richard Verschoor	MP Motorsport	17	+41.006	13	
18	30	(Brazil) Felipe Drugovich	Carlin Buzz Racing	17	+41.357	23	
19	19	(Finland) Niko Kari	Trident	17	+41.442	21	
20	10	(Netherlands) Bent Viscaal	HWA Racelab	17	+42.303	16	
21	11	(United Kingdom) Jake Hughes	HWA Racelab	17	+43.007	5	
22	7	(Germany) Lirim Zendeli	Sauber Junior Team by Charouz	17	+43.809	30	
23	16	(Germany) Andreas Estner	Jenzer Motorsport	17	+52.045	26	
24	5	(Finland) Simo Laaksonen	MP Motorsport	17	+53.111	27	
25	25	(Spain) Sebastián Fernández	Campos Racing	17	+55.152	25	
26	9	(United Kingdom) Raoul Hyman	Sauber Junior Team by Charouz	17	+56.454	24	
27	8	(Switzerland) Fabio Scherer	Sauber Junior Team by Charouz	17	+59.466	28	
28	24	(Italy) Alessio Deledda	Campos Racing	17	+63.428	29	
29	17	(Canada) Devlin DeFrancesco	Trident	17	+76.706	7	
DNF	23	(Australia) Alex Peroni	Campos Racing		Collision	11	
Fastest lap set by Pedro Piquet: 2:08.911 (lap 4)

=== Race 2 ===
Pos.	No.	Driver	Team	Laps	Time/Retired	Grid	Pts.
1	26	(New Zealand) Marcus Armstrong	Prema Racing	17	42:03.504	1	15 (2)
2	14	(Japan) Yuki Tsunoda	Jenzer Motorsport	17	+4.515	3	12
3	28	(Russia) Robert Shwartzman	Prema Racing	17	+5.616	7	10
4	3	(Denmark) Christian Lundgaard	ART Grand Prix	17	+6.538	5	8
5	27	(India) Jehan Daruvala	Prema Racing	17	+7.612	6	6
6	18	(Brazil) Pedro Piquet	Trident	17	+8.200	8	4
7	20	(Italy) Leonardo Pulcini	Hitech Grand Prix	17	+9.124	2	2
8	29	(Japan) Teppei Natori	Carlin Buzz Racing	17	+10.245	11	1
9	30	(Brazil) Felipe Drugovich	Carlin Buzz Racing	17	+10.843	18	
10	22	(China) Ye Yifei	Hitech Grand Prix	17	+13.881	15	
11	6	(Netherlands) Richard Verschoor	MP Motorsport	17	+15.469	17	
12	1	(Germany) David Beckmann	ART Grand Prix	17	+16.613	10	
13	25	(Spain) Sebastián Fernández	Campos Racing	17	+16.929	25	
14	10	(Netherlands) Bent Viscaal	HWA Racelab	17	+18.504	20	
15	23	(Australia) Alex Peroni	Campos Racing	17	+20.046	30	
16	12	(Iran) Keyvan Andres	HWA Racelab	17	+20.391	14	
17	16	(Germany) Andreas Estner	Jenzer Motorsport	17	+25.426	23	
18	8	(Switzerland) Fabio Scherer	Sauber Junior Team by Charouz	17	+25.864	27	
19	4	(New Zealand) Liam Lawson	MP Motorsport	17	+26.724	12	
20	24	(Italy) Alessio Deledda	Campos Racing	17	+27.058	28	
21	21	(Estonia) Jüri Vips	Hitech Grand Prix	17	+97.427	4	
22	7	(Germany) Lirim Zendeli	Sauber Junior Team by Charouz	15	Collision	22	
DNF	2	(United Kingdom) Max Fewtrell	ART Grand Prix		Collision	9	
DNF	31	(United States) Logan Sargeant	Carlin Buzz Racing		Puncture	13	
DNF	15	(Switzerland) Giorgio Carrara	Jenzer Motorsport		Collision	16	
DNF	19	(Finland) Niko Kari	Trident		Collision	19	
DNF	11	(United Kingdom) Jake Hughes	HWA Racelab		Collision	21	
DNF	5	(Finland) Simo Laaksonen	MP Motorsport		Crash	24	
DNF	9	(United Kingdom) Raoul Hyman	Sauber Junior Team by Charouz		Collision	26	
DNF	17	(Canada) Devlin DeFrancesco	Trident		Collision	29	
Fastest lap set by Marcus Armstrong: 2:08.535 (lap 2)

== See also ==
- 2019 Belgian Grand Prix
- 2019 Spa-Francorchamps Formula 2 round

Previous round: 2019 Budapest Formula 3 round	FIA Formula 3 Championship; 2019 season	Next round: 2019 Monza Formula 3 round
Previous round: 2018 Spa-Francorchamps GP3 Series round	Spa-Francorchamps Formula 3 round	Next round: 2020 Spa-Francorchamps Formula 3 round
