= 2019 Le Castellet Formula 3 round =

(France) 2019 Paul Ricard Formula 3 round
Round details
- Round 2 of 8 in the 2019 FIA Formula 3 Championship.
- Layout of the Circuit Paul Ricard
- Location: Circuit Paul Ricard; Le Castellet, Provence-Alpes-Côte d'Azur, France
- Course: Permanent racing facility 5.842 km (3.630 mi)

Feature Race
- Date: 22 June 2019
- Laps: 20
Pole position
Driver	(United Kingdom) Jake Hughes	HWA Racelab
Time	1:49.519	
Podium
First	(India) Jehan Daruvala	Prema Racing
Second	(Russia) Robert Shwartzman	Prema Racing
Third	(Brazil) Pedro Piquet	Trident
Fastest lap
Driver	(Brazil) Felipe Drugovich	Carlin Racing
- Time: 1:52.358 (on lap 19)

Sprint Race
- Date: 23 June 2019
- Laps: 20
Podium
First	(Russia) Robert Shwartzman	Prema Racing
Second	(Brazil) Pedro Piquet	Trident
Third	(India) Jehan Daruvala	Prema Racing
Fastest lap
Driver	(New Zealand) Marcus Armstrong	Prema Racing
- Time: 1:52.171 (on lap 18)

The 2019 Paul Ricard FIA Formula 3 round was a motor racing event held on 22 and 23 June 2019 at the Circuit Paul Ricard in France. It is the second round of the 2019 FIA Formula 3 Championship, and ran in support of the 2019 French Grand Prix.

== Summary ==
=== Background ===
Following the opening round, Russian driver Robert Shwartzman leads the championship by thirteen points over Christian Lundgaard of Denmark, with Shwartzman's team-mate Jehan Daruvala a further three points behind the Dane.

Artem Petrov will be absent from the round, and with his Jenzer Motorsport team unable to draft in a replacement due to visa restrictions the grid would stand at 29 cars.

=== Qualifying ===
Jake Hughes of HWA Racelab would claim the pole position, beating Daruvala by just under 9-hundredths of a second. Championship leader Shwartzman will start third alongside Pedro Piquet, son of former world champion Nelson Piquet.

== Classification ==
=== Qualifying ===
Pos.	No.	Driver	Team	Time/Gap	Grid
1	11	(United Kingdom) Jake Hughes	HWA Racelab	1:49.519	1
2	27	(India) Jehan Daruvala	Prema Racing	+0.087	2
3	28	(Russia) Robert Shwartzman	Prema Racing	+0.239	3
4	18	(Brazil) Pedro Piquet	Trident	+0.425	4
5	26	(New Zealand) Marcus Armstrong	Prema Racing	+0.547	5
6	20	(Italy) Leonardo Pulcini	Hitech Grand Prix	+0.576	6
7	21	(Estonia) Jüri Vips	Hitech Grand Prix	+0.609	7
8	10	(Netherlands) Bent Viscaal	HWA Racelab	+0.673	8
9	19	(Finland) Niko Kari	Trident	+0.734	9
10	23	(Australia) Alex Peroni	Campos Racing	+0.797	10
11	31	(United States) Logan Sargeant	Carlin Racing	+0.826	11
12	3	(Denmark) Christian Lundgaard	ART Grand Prix	+0.859	12
13	6	(Netherlands) Richard Verschoor	MP Motorsport	+0.932	13
14	2	(United Kingdom) Max Fewtrell	ART Grand Prix	+0.937	14
15	4	(New Zealand) Liam Lawson	MP Motorsport	+0.949	15
16	22	(China) Ye Yifei	Hitech Grand Prix	+0.972	16
17	7	(Germany) Lirim Zendeli	Sauber Junior Team by Charouz	+0.991	17
18	30	(Brazil) Felipe Drugovich	Carlin Racing	+1.030	18
19	17	(Canada) Devlin DeFrancesco	Trident	+1.047	19
20	5	(Finland) Simo Laaksonen	MP Motorsport	+1.066	20
21	29	(Japan) Teppei Natori	Carlin Racing	+1.154	21
22	1	(Germany) David Beckmann	ART Grand Prix	+1.197	22
23	8	(Switzerland) Fabio Scherer	Sauber Junior Team by Charouz	+1.230	23
24	9	(United Kingdom) Raoul Hyman	Sauber Junior Team by Charouz	+1.272	24
25	12	(Iran) Keyvan Andres	HWA Racelab	+1.549	25
26	25	(Spain) Sebastián Fernández	Campos Racing	+1.753	26
27	14	(Japan) Yuki Tsunoda	Jenzer Motorsport	+2.468	27
28	16	(Germany) Andreas Estner	Jenzer Motorsport	+2.547	28
29	24	(Italy) Alessio Deledda	Campos Racing	+4.707	29

=== Feature Race ===
Pos.	No.	Driver	Team	Laps	Time/Retired	Grid	Pts.
1	27	(India) Jehan Daruvala	Prema Racing	20	38:27.360	2	25
2	28	(Russia) Robert Shwartzman	Prema Racing	20	+2.805	3	18
3	18	(Brazil) Pedro Piquet	Trident Racing	20	+3.213	4	15
4	21	(Estonia) Jüri Vips	Hitech Grand Prix	20	+3.706	7	12
5	10	(Netherlands) Bent Viscaal	HWA Racelab	20	+19.308	8	10
6	26	(New Zealand) Marcus Armstrong	Prema Racing	20	+21.146	5	8
7	14	(Japan) Yuki Tsunoda	Jenzer Motorsport	20	+24.970^{1}	27	6 (2)
8	23	(Australia) Alex Peroni	Campos Racing	20	+25.807	10	4
9	4	(New Zealand) Liam Lawson	MP Motorsport	20	+26.980	15	2
10	1	(Germany) David Beckmann	ART Grand Prix	20	+30.123^{1}	22	1
11	16	(Germany) Andreas Estner	Jenzer Motorsport	20	+30.817	28	
12	31	(United States) Logan Sargeant	Carlin Racing	20	+32.272^{1}	11	
13	22	(China) Ye Yifei	Hitech Grand Prix	20	+33.340	16	
14	6	(Netherlands) Richard Verschoor	MP Motorsport	20	+36.720	13	
15	8	(Switzerland) Fabio Scherer	Sauber Junior Team by Charouz	20	+40.231	23	
16	24	(Italy) Alessio Deledda	Campos Racing	20	+1:01.610	29	
17	9	(United Kingdom) Raoul Hyman	Sauber Junior Team by Charouz	20	+1:01.879	24	
18	19	(Finland) Niko Kari	Trident	20	+1:08.806	9	
19	30	(Brazil) Felipe Drugovich	Carlin Racing	20	+1:35.552	18	
20	5	(Finland) Simo Laaksonen	MP Motorsport	19	+1 lap	20	
21	17	(Canada) Devlin DeFrancesco	Trident	18	Puncture	19	
Ret	11	(United Kingdom) Jake Hughes	HWA Racelab	15	Crash	1	(4)
Ret	25	(Spain) Sebastián Fernández	Campos Racing	15	Collision damage	26	
Ret	2	(United Kingdom) Max Fewtrell	ART Grand Prix	10	Puncture	14	
Ret	7	(Germany) Lirim Zendeli	Sauber Junior Team by Charouz	9		17	
Ret	29	(Japan) Teppei Natori	Carlin Racing	1	Crash	21	
Ret	20	(Italy) Leonardo Pulcini	Hitech Grand Prix	1	Collision damage	6	
Ret	3	(Denmark) Christian Lundgaard	ART Grand Prix	1	Suspension^{1}	12	
Ret	12	(Iran) Keyvan Andres	HWA Racelab	0	Mechanical	PL	
Fastest lap set by (Japan) Yuki Tsunoda: 1:53.134

Notes:

- ^1 Yuki Tsunoda, David Beckmann and Christian Lundgaard were awarded a five-second penalty for track limits abuse.

=== Sprint Race ===
Pos.	No.	Driver	Team	Laps	Time/Retired	Grid	Pts.
1	28	(Russia) Robert Shwartzman	Prema Racing	20	38:04.147	7	15
2	18	(Brazil) Pedro Piquet	Trident	20	+1.479	6	12
3	27	(India) Jehan Daruvala	Prema Racing	20	+2.849	8	10
4	6	(Netherlands) Richard Verschoor	MP Motorsport	20	+8.300	14	8
5	26	(New Zealand) Marcus Armstrong	Prema Racing	20	+15.141	3	6 (2)
6	4	(New Zealand) Liam Lawson	MP Motorsport	20	+16.233	9	4
7	11	(United Kingdom) Jake Hughes	HWA Racelab	20	+21.364	22	2
8	31	(United States) Logan Sargeant	Carlin Racing	20	+21.913	12	1
9	14	(Japan) Yuki Tsunoda	Jenzer Motorsport	20	+22.906	2	
10	30	(Brazil) Felipe Drugovich	Carlin Racing	20	+25.613	19	
11	16	(Germany) Andreas Estner	Jenzer Motorsport	20	+25.675	11	
12	20	(Italy) Leonardo Pulcini	Hitech Grand Prix	20	+25.918	29	
13	9	(South Africa) Raoul Hyman	Sauber Junior Team by Charouz	20	+29.772	17	
14	23	(Australia) Alex Peroni	Campos Racing	20	+30.323	1	
15	3	(Denmark) Christian Lundgaard	ART Grand Prix	20	+31.441	27	
16	7	(Germany) Lirim Zendeli	Sauber Junior Team by Charouz	20	+32.041	25	
17	21	(Estonia) Jüri Vips	Hitech Grand Prix	20	+32.599	5	
18	2	(United Kingdom) Max Fewtrell	ART Grand Prix	20	+33.958	24	
19	12	(Iran) Keyvan Andres	HWA Racelab	20	+34.809	28	
20	10	(Netherlands) Bent Viscaal	HWA Racelab	20	+34.811	4	
21	17	(Canada) Devlin DeFrancesco	Trident	20	+37.501	21	
22	22	(China) Ye Yifei	Hitech Grand Prix	20	+1:06.052	13	
23	24	(Italy) Alessio Deledda	Campos Racing	20	+1:48.973	16	
24	19	(Finland) Niko Kari	Trident	18	+2 Laps	18	
Ret	5	(Finland) Simo Laaksonen	MP Motorsport	16	Fuel pump	20	
Ret	25	(Venezuela) Sebastián Fernández	Campos Racing	15		23	
Ret	8	(Switzerland) Fabio Scherer	Sauber Junior Team by Charouz	11	Suspension	15	
Ret	29	(Japan) Teppei Natori	Carlin Racing	5	Crash damage	26	
Ret	1	(Germany) David Beckmann	ART Grand Prix	2	Puncture	10	
Fastest lap set by (New Zealand) Marcus Armstrong: 1:52.171

== Standings after the event ==
Drivers' Championship standings

	Pos	Driver	Points
	1	(Russia) Robert Shwartzman	70
1	2	(India) Jehan Daruvala	58
1	3	(New Zealand) Marcus Armstrong	37
1	4	(Estonia) Jüri Vips	32
6	5	(Brazil) Pedro Piquet	27

Teams' Championship standings

	Pos	Team	Points
	1	(Italy) Prema Racing	163
	2	(France) ART Grand Prix	50
1	3	(Italy) Trident	41
1	4	(United Kingdom) Hitech Grand Prix	32
	5	(Netherlands) MP Motorsport	16

- Note: Only the top five positions are included for both sets of standings.

== See also ==
- 2019 French Grand Prix
- 2019 Le Castellet Formula 2 round

Previous round: 2019 Barcelona Formula 3 round	FIA Formula 3 Championship; 2019 season	Next round: 2019 Spielberg Formula 3 round
Previous round: 2018 Le Castellet GP3 Series round	Le Castellet Formula 3 round	Next round: 2021 Le Castellet Formula 3 round
