= 2019 Monza Formula 3 round =

Motor racing competition

(Italy) 2019 Monza Formula 3 round
Round details
- Round 7 of 8 in the 2019 FIA Formula 3 Championship.
- Layout of the Autodromo Nazionale di Monza
- Location: Autodromo Nazionale di Monza; Monza, Italy
- Course: Permanent racing facility 5.793 km (3.600 mi)

Race 1
- Date: 7 September 2019
- Laps: 22
Pole position
| Driver | (Denmark) Christian Lundgaard | ART Grand Prix |
| Time | 1:38.834 | |
Podium
| First | (Russia) Robert Shwartzman | Prema Racing |
| Second | (India) Jehan Daruvala | Prema Racing |
| Third | (Japan) Yuki Tsunoda | Jenzer Motorsport |
Fastest lap
| Driver | (Russia) Robert Shwartzman | Prema Racing |
- Time: 1:40.020 (on lap 17)

Race 2
- Date: 8 September 2019
- Laps: 22
Podium
| First | (Japan) Yuki Tsunoda | Jenzer Motorsport |
| Second | (New Zealand) Liam Lawson | MP Motorsport |
| Third | (United Kingdom) Jake Hughes | HWA Racelab |
Fastest lap
| Driver | (Estonia) Jüri Vips | Hitech Grand Prix |
- Time: 1:48.890 (on lap 20)

The 2019 Monza FIA Formula 3 round was a motor racing event held on 7 and 8 September 2019 at the Autodromo Nazionale di Monza, Monza, Italy. It was the penultimate race of the 2019 FIA Formula 3 Championship, and ran in support of the 2019 Italian Grand Prix.

== Classification ==
=== Qualifying ===
The Qualifying session took place on 6 September 2019, with Christian Lundgaard scoring pole position.

| Pos. | No. | Driver | Team | Time/Gap | Grid |
|---|---|---|---|---|---|
| 1 | 3 | (Denmark) Christian Lundgaard | ART Grand Prix | 1:38.834 | 1 |
| 2 | 26 | (New Zealand) Marcus Armstrong | Prema Racing | +0.135 | 2 |
| 3 | 28 | (Russia) Robert Shwartzman | Prema Racing | +0.203 | 3 |
| 4 | 27 | (India) Jehan Daruvala | Prema Racing | +0.221 | 4 |
| 5 | 7 | (Germany) Lirim Zendeli | Sauber Junior Team by Charouz | +0.343 | 5 |
| 6 | 29 | (Japan) Teppei Natori | Carlin Buzz Racing | +0.469 | 6 |
| 7 | 2 | (United Kingdom) Max Fewtrell | ART Grand Prix | +0.473 | 7 |
| 8 | 6 | (Netherlands) Richard Verschoor | MP Motorsport | +0.478 | 8 |
| 9 | 19 | (Finland) Niko Kari | Trident | +0.509 | 9 |
| 10 | 15 | (Switzerland) Giorgio Carrara | Jenzer Motorsport | +0.510 | 10 |
| 11 | 14 | (Japan) Yuki Tsunoda | Jenzer Motorsport | +0.603 | 11 |
| 12 | 11 | (United Kingdom) Jake Hughes | HWA Racelab | +0.610 | 12 |
| 13 | 4 | (New Zealand) Liam Lawson | MP Motorsport | +0.671 | 13 |
| 14 | 18 | (Brazil) Pedro Piquet | Trident | +0.677 | 14 |
| 15 | 21 | (Estonia) Jüri Vips | Hitech Grand Prix | +0.811 | 15 |
| 16 | 31 | (United States) Logan Sargeant | Carlin Buzz Racing | +0.883 | 16 |
| 17 | 1 | (Germany) David Beckmann | ART Grand Prix | +0.954 | 17 |
| 18 | 23 | (Australia) Alex Peroni | Campos Racing | +0.996 | 18 |
| 19 | 5 | (Finland) Simo Laaksonen | MP Motorsport | +1.234 | 19 |
| 20 | 12 | (Iran) Keyvan Andres | HWA Racelab | +1.250 | 20 |
| 21 | 10 | (Netherlands) Bent Viscaal | HWA Racelab | +1.263 | 21 |
| 22 | 20 | (Italy) Leonardo Pulcini | Hitech Grand Prix | +1.274 | 22 |
| 23 | 17 | (Canada) Devlin DeFrancesco | Trident | +1.280 | 23 |
| 24 | 25 | (Spain) Sebastián Fernández | Campos Racing | +1.356 | 24 |
| 25 | 8 | (Switzerland) Fabio Scherer | Sauber Junior Team by Charouz | +1.424 | 25 |
| 26 | 30 | (Brazil) Felipe Drugovich | Carlin Buzz Racing | +1.536 | 26 |
| 27 | 22 | (China) Ye Yifei | Hitech Grand Prix | +1.805 | 27 |
| 28 | 9 | (United Kingdom) Raoul Hyman | Sauber Junior Team by Charouz | +2.218 | 28 |
| 29 | 24 | (Italy) Alessio Deledda | Campos Racing | +2.327 | 29 |
| 30 | 16 | (Germany) Andreas Estner | Jenzer Motorsport | +3.197 | 30 |

=== Race 1 ===
| Pos. | No. | Driver | Team | Laps | Time/Retired | Grid | Pts. |
|---|---|---|---|---|---|---|---|
| 1 | 28 | (Russia) Robert Shwartzman | Prema Racing | 22 | 42:46.627 | 8 | 25 (2) |
| 2 | 27 | (India) Jehan Daruvala | Prema Racing | 22 | +1.391 | 10 | 18 |
| 3 | 14 | (Japan) Yuki Tsunoda | Jenzer Motorsport | 22 | +1.923 | 6 | 15 |
| 4 | 6 | (Netherlands) Richard Verschoor | MP Motorsport | 22 | +2.372 | 3 | 12 |
| 5 | 18 | (Brazil) Pedro Piquet | Trident | 22 | +3.517 | 9 | 10 |
| 6 | 11 | (United Kingdom) Jake Hughes | HWA Racelab | 22 | +4.557 | 18 | 8 |
| 7 | 4 | (New Zealand) Liam Lawson | MP Motorsport | 22 | +5.170 | 14 | 6 |
| 8 | 8 | (Switzerland) Fabio Scherer | Sauber Junior Team by Charouz | 22 | +5.837 | 20 | 4 |
| 9 | 31 | (United States) Logan Sargeant | Carlin Buzz Racing | 22 | +6.830 | 22 | 2 |
| 10 | 20 | (Italy) Leonardo Pulcini | Hitech Grand Prix | 22 | +7.473 | 27 | 1 |
| 11 | 29 | (Japan) Teppei Natori | Carlin Buzz Racing | 22 | +8.620 | 12 | |
| 12 | 17 | (Canada) Devlin DeFrancesco | Trident | 22 | +8.935 | 24 | |
| 13 | 3 | (Denmark) Christian Lundgaard | ART Grand Prix | 22 | +9.924 | 1 | (4) |
| 14 | 2 | (United Kingdom) Max Fewtrell | ART Grand Prix | 22 | +10.951 | 5 | |
| 15 | 9 | (United Kingdom) Raoul Hyman | Sauber Junior Team by Charouz | 22 | +11.728 | 23 | |
| 16 | 30 | (Brazil) Felipe Drugovich | Carlin Buzz Racing | 22 | +12.206 | 29 | |
| 17 | 10 | (Netherlands) Bent Viscaal | HWA Racelab | 22 | +13.198 | 28 | |
| 18 | 25 | (Spain) Sebastián Fernández | Campos Racing | 22 | +15.523 | 19 | |
| 19 | 12 | (Iran) Keyvan Andres | HWA Racelab | 22 | +17.850 | 16 | |
| 20 | 5 | (Finland) Simo Laaksonen | MP Motorsport | 22 | +19.367 | 15 | |
| 21 | 26 | (New Zealand) Marcus Armstrong | Prema Racing | 22 | +20.559 | 7 | |
| 22 | 16 | (Germany) Andreas Estner | Jenzer Motorsport | 22 | +21.148 | 26 | |
| 23 | 24 | (Italy) Alessio Deledda | Campos Racing | 22 | +22.067 | 25 | |
| DNF | 23 | (Australia) Alex Peroni | Campos Racing | 18 | Crash | 13 | |
| DNF | 7 | (Germany) Lirim Zendeli | Sauber Junior Team by Charouz | | Collision | 2 | |
| DNF | 19 | (Finland) Niko Kari | Trident | | Collision | 11 | |
| DNF | 15 | (Switzerland) Giorgio Carrara | Jenzer Motorsport | | Collision | 4 | |
| DNF | 21 | (Estonia) Jüri Vips | Hitech Grand Prix | | Collision | 17 | |
| DNF | 1 | (Germany) David Beckmann | ART Grand Prix | | Collision | 21 | |
| DNF | 22 | (China) Ye Yifei | Hitech Grand Prix | | Collision | 30 | |
Fastest lap set by Robert Shwartzman: 1:40.020 (lap 17)

=== Race 2 ===
| Pos. | No. | Driver | Team | Laps | Time/Retired | Grid | Pts. |
|---|---|---|---|---|---|---|---|
| 1 | 14 | (Japan) Yuki Tsunoda | Jenzer Motorsport | 22 | 41:11.470 | 6 | 15 |
| 2 | 4 | (New Zealand) Liam Lawson | MP Motorsport | 22 | +1.312 | 2 | 12 |
| 3 | 11 | (United Kingdom) Jake Hughes | HWA Racelab | 22 | +2.018 | 3 | 10 |
| 4 | 6 | (Netherlands) Richard Verschoor | MP Motorsport | 22 | +2.803 | 5 | 8 (2) |
| 5 | 18 | (Brazil) Pedro Piquet | Trident | 22 | +6.861 | 4 | 6 |
| 6 | 20 | (Italy) Leonardo Pulcini | Hitech Grand Prix | 22 | +7.930 | 10 | 4 |
| 7 | 8 | (Switzerland) Fabio Scherer | Sauber Junior Team by Charouz | 22 | +14.329 | 1 | 2 |
| 8 | 28 | (Russia) Robert Shwartzman | Prema Racing | 22 | +14.952 | 8 | 1 |
| 9 | 3 | (Denmark) Christian Lundgaard | ART Grand Prix | 22 | +15.019 | 13 | |
| 10 | 31 | (United States) Logan Sargeant | Carlin Buzz Racing | 22 | +16.320 | 9 | |
| 11 | 21 | (Estonia) Jüri Vips | Hitech Grand Prix | 22 | +16.417 | | |
| 12 | 30 | (Brazil) Felipe Drugovich | Carlin Buzz Racing | 22 | +19.285 | 16 | |
| 13 | 27 | (India) Jehan Daruvala | Prema Racing | 22 | +22.373 | 7 | |
| 14 | 26 | (New Zealand) Marcus Armstrong | Prema Racing | 22 | +23.517 | 21 | |
| 15 | 19 | (Finland) Niko Kari | Trident | 22 | +25.101 | | |
| 16 | 17 | (Canada) Devlin DeFrancesco | Trident | 22 | +25.759 | 12 | |
| 17 | 9 | (United Kingdom) Raoul Hyman | Sauber Junior Team by Charouz | 22 | +25.970 | 15 | |
| 18 | 7 | (Germany) Lirim Zendeli | Sauber Junior Team by Charouz | 22 | +30.267 | | |
| 19 | 22 | (China) Ye Yifei | Hitech Grand Prix | 22 | +35.425 | | |
| 20 | 5 | (Finland) Simo Laaksonen | MP Motorsport | 22 | +36.412 | 20 | |
| 21 | 2 | (United Kingdom) Max Fewtrell | ART Grand Prix | 22 | +37.328 | 14 | |
| 22 | 12 | (Iran) Keyvan Andres | HWA Racelab | 22 | +38.842 | 19 | |
| 23 | 15 | (Switzerland) Giorgio Carrara | Jenzer Motorsport | 22 | +44.302 | | |
| 24 | 16 | (Germany) Andreas Estner | Jenzer Motorsport | 22 | +47.238 | 22 | |
| 25 | 24 | (Italy) Alessio Deledda | Campos Racing | 22 | +76.932 | 23 | |
| 26 | 25 | (Spain) Sebastián Fernández | Campos Racing | 22 | +97.975 | 18 | |
| 27 | 10 | (Netherlands) Bent Viscaal | HWA Racelab | 21 | +1 Lap | 17 | |
| 28 | 1 | (Germany) David Beckmann | ART Grand Prix | 21 | +1 Lap | | |
| 29 | 29 | (Japan) Teppei Natori | Carlin Buzz Racing | 21 | +1 Lap | 11 | |
| DNS | 23 | (Australia) Alex Peroni | Campos Racing | 0 | Injured | - | |
Fastest lap set by Jüri Vips: 1:48.890 (lap 20)

== See also ==
- 2019 Italian Grand Prix
- 2019 Monza Formula 2 round

| Previous round: 2019 Spa-Francorchamps Formula 3 round | FIA Formula 3 Championship; 2019 season | Next round: 2019 Sochi Formula 3 round |
| Previous round: 2018 Monza GP3 Series round | Monza Formula 3 round | Next round: 2020 Monza Formula 3 round |
