= 2018 Yas Marina GP3 Series round =

(United Arab Emirates) 2018 Yas Marina GP3 round
Round details
- Round 9 of 9 rounds in the 2018 GP3 Series
- Location: Yas Marina Circuit Abu Dhabi, United Arab Emirates
- Course: Permanent racing facility 5.554 km (3.451 mi)

GP3 Series

Race 1
- Date: 25 November 2018
- Laps: 18

Pole position
Driver	(Russia) Nikita Mazepin	ART Grand Prix
- Time: 1:54.885

Podium
First	(Italy) Leonardo Pulcini	Campos Racing
Second	(Germany) David Beckmann	Trident
Third	(France) Anthoine Hubert	ART Grand Prix

Fastest lap
Driver	(Russia) Nikita Mazepin	ART Grand Prix
- Time: 1:59.168 (on lap 2)

Race 2
- Date: 26 November 2018
- Laps: 14

Podium
First	(Russia) Nikita Mazepin	ART Grand Prix
Second	(United Kingdom) Jake Hughes	ART Grand Prix
Third	(Finland) Simo Laaksonen	Campos Racing

Fastest lap
Driver	(India) Jehan Daruvala (Note: Jehan Daruvala set the fastest lap, but did not finish in the top 10, so was ineligible to be the point-scorer for the fastest lap. Ryan Tveter was the point-scorer instead for setting the fastest lap of those finishing in the top 10.)	MP Motorsport
- Time: 1:59.800 (on lap 8)

The 2018 Yas Marina GP3 Series round was the final round of the 2018 GP3 Series. It was held on 24 and 25 November 2018 at Yas Marina Circuit in Abu Dhabi, United Arab Emirates. The race supported the 2018 Abu Dhabi Grand Prix. The round was the last for Anthoine Hubert, who was promoted to FIA Formula 2 for 2019, where he won in Monaco and Paul Ricard and died in Spa-Francorchamps.

== Classification ==
=== Qualifying ===
Pos.	No.	Driver	Team	Time	Gap	Grid
1	3	(Russia) Nikita Mazepin	ART Grand Prix	1:54.885		1
2	18	(Italy) Leonardo Pulcini	Campos Racing	1:54.952	+0.067	2
3	2	(France) Anthoine Hubert	ART Grand Prix	1:55.041	+0.156	3
4	4	(United Kingdom) Jake Hughes	ART Grand Prix	1:55.068	+0.183	4
5	1	(United Kingdom) Callum Ilott	ART Grand Prix	1:55.098	+0.213	5
6	8	(Germany) David Beckmann	Trident	1:55.178	+0.293	6
7	6	(France) Giuliano Alesi	Trident	1:55.345	+0.460	7
8	7	(United States) Ryan Tveter	Trident	1:55.511	+0.626	8
9	19	(Finland) Simo Laaksonen	Campos Racing	1:55.525	+0.640	9
10	10	(United States) Juan Manuel Correa	Jenzer Motorsport	1:55.535	+0.650	10
11	5	(Brazil) Pedro Piquet	Trident	1:55.589	+0.704	11
12	22	(Netherlands) Richard Verschoor	MP Motorsport	1:55.597	+0.712	12
13	11	(Germany) Jannes Fittje	Jenzer Motorsport	1:55.782	+0.897	13
14	9	(Colombia) Tatiana Calderón	Jenzer Motorsport	1:55.789	+0.904	14
15	24	(India) Jehan Daruvala	MP Motorsport	1:55.828	+0.943	15
16	14	(France) Gabriel Aubry	Arden International	1:55.836	+0.951	16
17	20	(Mexico) Diego Menchaca	Campos Racing	1:55.914	+1.029	17
18	15	(France) Sacha Fenestraz	Arden International	1:55.985	+1.100	18
19	23	(Canada) Devlin DeFrancesco	MP Motorsport	1:56.142	+1.257	19
20	16	(Australia) Joey Mawson	Arden International	1:56.276	+1.391	20

=== Race 1 ===
Pos.	No.	Driver	Team	Laps	Time/Retired	Grid	Points
1	18	(Italy) Leonardo Pulcini	Campos Racing	18	36:04.077	2	25
2	8	(Germany) David Beckmann	Trident	18	+8.631	6	18
3	2	(France) Anthoine Hubert	ART Grand Prix	18	+10.360	3	15
4	1	(United Kingdom) Callum Ilott	ART Grand Prix	18	+11.156	5	12
5	3	(Russia) Nikita Mazepin	ART Grand Prix	18	+11.481	1	10+4+2
6	6	(France) Giuliano Alesi	Trident	18	+12.701	7	8
7	4	(United Kingdom) Jake Hughes	ART Grand Prix	18	+16.729	4	6
8	10	(United States) Juan Manuel Correa	Jenzer Motorsport	18	+17.110	10	4
9	19	(Finland) Simo Laaksonen	Campos Racing	18	+17.512	9	2
10	9	(Colombia) Tatiana Calderón	Jenzer Motorsport	18	+17.804	14	1
11	7	(United States) Ryan Tveter	Trident	18	+18.479	8	
12	5	(Brazil) Pedro Piquet	Trident	18	+20.350	11	
13	11	(Germany) Jannes Fittje	Jenzer Motorsport	18	+21.523	13	
14	22	(Netherlands) Richard Verschoor	MP Motorsport	18	+22.728	12	
15	14	(France) Gabriel Aubry	Arden International	18	+24.169	16	
16	15	(France) Sacha Fenestraz	Arden International	18	+26.043	18	
17	23	(Canada) Devlin DeFrancesco	MP Motorsport	18	+28.055	19	
18	20	(Mexico) Diego Menchaca	Campos Racing	18	+32.591	17	
19	24	(India) Jehan Daruvala	MP Motorsport	18	+39.718	15	
20	16	(Australia) Joey Mawson	Arden International	18	+1:09.610	20	
Fastest lap: Nikita Mazepin − ART Grand Prix − 1:59.168 (on lap 2)

=== Race 2 ===
Pos.	No.	Driver	Team	Laps	Time/Retired	Grid	Points
1	3	(Russia) Nikita Mazepin	ART Grand Prix	14	30:16.148	4	15
2	4	(United Kingdom) Jake Hughes	ART Grand Prix	14	+1.317	2	12
3	19	(Finland) Simo Laaksonen	Campos Racing	14	+3.183	9	10
4	1	(United Kingdom) Callum Ilott	ART Grand Prix	14	+3.711	5	8
5	7	(United States) Ryan Tveter	Trident	14	+5.622	11	6+2
6	10	(United States) Juan Manuel Correa	Jenzer Motorsport	14	+5.712	1	4
7	22	(Netherlands) Richard Verschoor	MP Motorsport	14	+6.125	14	2
8	9	(Colombia) Tatiana Calderón	Jenzer Motorsport	14	+6.553	10	1
9	16	(Australia) Joey Mawson	Arden International	14	+7.987	20	
10	6	(France) Giuliano Alesi	Trident	14	+9.791	3	
11	23	(Canada) Devlin DeFrancesco	MP Motorsport	14	+10.790	17	
12	18	(Italy) Leonardo Pulcini	Campos Racing	14	+12.104	8	
13	24	(India) Jehan Daruvala	MP Motorsport	14	+14.713	19	
14	14	(France) Gabriel Aubry	Arden International	14	+14.915	15	
15	15	(France) Sacha Fenestraz	Arden International	14	+18.047	16	
16	20	(Mexico) Diego Menchaca	Campos Racing	14	+18.801	18	
Ret	2	(France) Anthoine Hubert	ART Grand Prix	0	Collision	6	
Ret	8	(Germany) David Beckmann	Trident	0	Collision	7	
Ret	5	(Brazil) Pedro Piquet	Trident	0	Collision	12	
Ret	11	(Germany) Jannes Fittje	Jenzer Motorsport	0	Collision	13	
Fastest lap: Jehan Daruvala − MP Motorsport − 1:59.800 (on lap 8)

== See also ==
- 2018 Abu Dhabi Grand Prix
- 2018 Yas Island Formula 2 round

== Notes ==
Previous round: 2018 Sochi GP3 Series round	GP3 Series; 2018 season	Next round: 2019 Barcelona Formula 3 round
Previous round: 2017 Yas Marina GP3 Series round	Yas Marina GP3 round	Next round: None
