= 2019 Spielberg Formula 3 round =

Motor racing competition

(Austria) 2019 Spielberg Formula 3 round
Round details
- Round 3 of 8 in the 2019 FIA Formula 3 Championship.
- Layout of the Red Bull Ring
- Location: Red Bull Ring; Spielberg, Styria, Austria
- Course: Permanent racing facility 4.326 km (2.690 mi)

Race 1
- Date: 29 June 2019
- Laps: 24
Pole position
Driver	(New Zealand) Marcus Armstrong	Prema Racing
Time	1:19.716	
Podium
First	(Estonia) Jüri Vips	Hitech Grand Prix
Second	(United Kingdom) Max Fewtrell	ART Grand Prix
Third	(New Zealand) Marcus Armstrong	Prema Racing
Fastest lap
Driver	(Estonia) Jüri Vips	Hitech Grand Prix
- Time: 1:21.042 (on lap 23)

Race 2
- Date: 30 June 2019
- Laps: 24
Podium
First	(United Kingdom) Jake Hughes	HWA Racelab
Second	(India) Jehan Daruvala	Prema Racing
Third	(Russia) Robert Shwartzman	Prema Racing
Fastest lap
Driver	(Denmark) Christian Lundgaard	ART Grand Prix
- Time: 1:21.234 (on lap 20)

The 2019 Spielberg FIA Formula 3 round was a motor racing event held on 29 and 30 June 2019 at the Red Bull Ring in Austria. It is the third round of the 2019 FIA Formula 3 Championship, and ran in support of the 2019 Austrian Grand Prix.

== Summary ==
=== Background ===
Following the opening round, Russian driver Robert Shwartzman leads the championship by twelve points over team-mate Jehan Daruvala, with Prema's third driver Marcus Armstrong sitting a further thirteen points behind the Indian.

Jenzer Motorsport would enter Italian F4 Championship driver Giorgio Carrara in their third car after it was left unoccupied in France following the departure of Artem Petrov.

== Classification ==
=== Qualifying ===
Pos.	No.	Driver	Team	Time/Gap	Grid
1	26	(New Zealand) Marcus Armstrong	Prema Racing	1:19.716	1
2	2	(United Kingdom) Max Fewtrell	ART Grand Prix	+0.123	2
3	21	(Estonia) Jüri Vips	Hitech Grand Prix	+0.180	3
4	27	(India) Jehan Daruvala	Prema Racing	+0.218	4
5	11	(United Kingdom) Jake Hughes	HWA Racelab	+0.359	5
6	20	(Italy) Leonardo Pulcini	Hitech Grand Prix	+0.472	6
7	18	(Brazil) Pedro Piquet	Trident	+0.474	7
8	25	(Spain) Sebastián Fernández	Campos Racing	+0.488	8
9	7	(Germany) Lirim Zendeli	Sauber Junior Team by Charouz	+0.518	9
10	28	(Russia) Robert Shwartzman	Prema Racing	+0.561	10
11	10	(Netherlands) Bent Viscaal	HWA Racelab	+0.585	11
12	6	(Netherlands) Richard Verschoor	MP Motorsport	+0.592	12
13	17	(Canada) Devlin DeFrancesco	Trident	+0.607	13
14	23	(Australia) Alex Peroni	Campos Racing	+0.612	14
15	4	(New Zealand) Liam Lawson	MP Motorsport	+0.670	15
16	30	(Brazil) Felipe Drugovich	Carlin Buzz Racing	+0.691	16
17	5	(Finland) Simo Laaksonen	MP Motorsport	+0.711	17
18	19	(Finland) Niko Kari	Trident	+0.760	18
19	29	(Japan) Teppei Natori	Carlin Buzz Racing	+0.823	19
20	15	(Switzerland) Giorgio Carrara	Jenzer Motorsport	+0.876	20
21	22	(China) Ye Yifei	Hitech Grand Prix	+0.946	21
22	31	(United States) Logan Sargeant	Carlin Buzz Racing	+0.957	22
23	8	(Switzerland) Fabio Scherer	Sauber Junior Team by Charouz	+1.062	23
24	9	(United Kingdom) Raoul Hyman	Sauber Junior Team by Charouz	+1.171	24
25	14	(Japan) Yuki Tsunoda	Jenzer Motorsport	+1.243	25
26	12	(Iran) Keyvan Andres	HWA Racelab	+1.603	27^{1}
27	16	(Germany) Andreas Estner	Jenzer Motorsport	+1.942	26
28	24	(Italy) Alessio Deledda	Campos Racing	+2.219	28^{1}
DSQ	3	(Denmark) Christian Lundgaard	ART Grand Prix		29^{2}
DSQ	1	(Germany) David Beckmann	ART Grand Prix		30^{2}

- ^1 – Andres and Deledda received a five-place grid penalty each for ignoring Virtual Safety car.
- ^2 – Lundgaard and Beckmann were excluded from qualifying after it was discovered unauthorized personnel were working on their cars in the pit-lane.

=== Feature Race ===
Pos.	No.	Driver	Team	Laps	Time/Retired	Grid	Pts.
1	21	(Estonia) Jüri Vips	Hitech Grand Prix	24	32:47.063	3	25 (2)
2	2	(United Kingdom) Max Fewtrell	ART Grand Prix	24	+1.741	2	18
3	26	(New Zealand) Marcus Armstrong	Prema Racing	24	+2.354	1	15 (4)
4	27	(India) Jehan Daruvala	Prema Racing	24	+3.605	4	12
5	28	(Russia) Robert Shwartzman	Prema Racing	24	+5.639	10	10
6	18	(Brazil) Pedro Piquet	Trident	24	+7.499	7	8
7	11	(United Kingdom) Jake Hughes	HWA Racelab	24	+8.435	5	6
8	7	(Germany) Lirim Zendeli	Sauber Junior Team by Charouz	24	+8.912	9	4
9	20	(Italy) Leonardo Pulcini	Hitech Grand Prix	24	+9.416	6	2
10	6	(Netherlands) Richard Verschoor	MP Motorsport	24	+13.291	12	1
11	19	(Finland) Niko Kari	Trident	24	+13.653	18	
12	30	(Brazil) Felipe Drugovich	Carlin Motorsport	24	+14.438	16	
13	10	(Netherlands) Bent Viscaal	HWA Racelab	24	+16.950	11	
14	4	(New Zealand) Liam Lawson	MP Motorsport	24	+17.275	15	
15	1	(Germany) David Beckmann	ART Grand Prix	24	+17.600	30	
16	14	(Japan) Yuki Tsunoda	Jenzer Motorsport	24	+20.560^{1}	25	
17	17	(Canada) Devlin DeFrancesco	Trident	24	+21.240	13	
18	5	(Finland) Simo Laaksonen	MP Motorsport	24	+23.114	17	
19	9	(South Africa) Raoul Hyman	Sauber Junior Team by Charouz	24	+26.110	24	
20	22	(China) Ye Yifei	Hitech Grand Prix	24	+31.607	21	
21	23	(Australia) Alex Peroni	Campos Racing	24	+32.667	14	
22	31	(United States) Logan Sargeant	Carlin Motorsport	24	+35.803	22	
23	16	(Germany) Andreas Estner	Jenzer Motorsport	24	+39.085	26	
24	25	(Venezuela) Sebastián Fernández	Campos Racing	24	+45.413	8	
25	24	(Italy) Alessio Deledda	Campos Racing	24	+46.679	28	
26	3	(Denmark) Christian Lundgaard	ART Grand Prix	24	+49.725	29	
27	12	(Iran) Keyvan Andres	HWA Racelab	24	+1:11.500	27	
28	15	(Argentina) Giorgio Carrara	Jenzer Motorsport	23	+1 lap	20	
Ret	8	(Switzerland) Fabio Scherer	Sauber Junior Team by Charouz	3	Mechanical	23	
Ret	29	(Japan) Teppei Natori	Carlin Motorsport	0	Mechanical	19	
Fastest lap set by (Estonia) Jüri Vips: 1:21.042

- ^1 – Tsunoda was awarded a five-second penalty for causing a collision.

=== Sprint Race ===
Pos.	No.	Driver	Team	Laps	Time/Retired	Grid	Pts.
1	11	(United Kingdom) Jake Hughes	HWA Racelab	24	34:47.494	2	15 (2)
2	27	(India) Jehan Daruvala	Prema Racing	24	+4.727	5	12
3	28	(Russia) Robert Shwartzman	Prema Racing	24	+4.850^{1}	4	10
4	2	(United Kingdom) Max Fewtrell	ART Grand Prix	24	+5.079	7	8
5	20	(Italy) Leonardo Pulcini	Hitech Grand Prix	24	+5.666	9	6
6	21	(Estonia) Jüri Vips	Hitech Grand Prix	24	+6.086	8	4
7	7	(Germany) Lirim Zendeli	Sauber Junior Team by Charouz	24	+6.705	1	2
8	19	(Finland) Niko Kari	Trident	24	+7.768	11	1
9	17	(Canada) Devlin DeFrancesco	Trident	24	+8.913	17	
10	1	(Germany) David Beckmann	ART Grand Prix	24	+10.172	15	
11	14	(Japan) Yuki Tsunoda	Jenzer Motorsport	24	+10.716	16	
12	6	(Netherlands) Richard Verschoor	MP Motorsport	24	+12.370	10	
13	12	(Iran) Keyvan Andres	HWA Racelab	24	+14.315	27	
14	30	(Brazil) Felipe Drugovich	Carlin Racing	24	+14.746	12	
15	18	(Brazil) Pedro Piquet	Trident	24	+15.423	3	
16	9	(South Africa) Raoul Hyman	Sauber Junior Team by Charouz	24	+15.703	19	
17	3	(Denmark) Christian Lundgaard	ART Grand Prix	24	+15.972	26	
18	5	(Finland) Simo Laaksonen	MP Motorsport	24	+19.677	18	
19	26	(New Zealand) Marcus Armstrong	Prema Racing	24	+19.863	6	
20	16	(Germany) Andreas Estner	Jenzer Motorsport	24	+22.026	23	
21	15	(Switzerland) Giorgio Carrara	Jenzer Motorsport	24	+23.867	28	
22	29	(Japan) Teppei Natori	Carlin Racing	24	+24.660	30	
23	8	(Switzerland) Fabio Scherer	Sauber Junior Team by Charouz	24	+25.232	29	
24	24	(Italy) Alessio Deledda	Campos Racing	24	+30.984	25	
25	4	(New Zealand) Liam Lawson	MP Motorsport	23	+1 Lap	14	
26	31	(United States) Logan Sargeant	Carlin Racing	21	+3 Laps	22	
Ret	25	(Venezuela) Sebastián Fernández	Campos Racing	20	Accident	24	
Ret	23	(Australia) Alex Peroni	Campos Racing	20	Accident	21	
Ret	22	(China) Ye Yifei	Hitech Grand Prix	10		20	
Ret	10	(Netherlands) Bent Viscaal	HWA Racelab	10		13	
Fastest lap set by (Denmark) Christian Lundgaard: 1:21.234

^1 Driver awarded a five-second penalty for causing a collision.

== Standings after the event ==
Drivers' Championship standings

	Pos	Driver	Points
	1	(Russia) Robert Shwartzman	90
	2	(India) Jehan Daruvala	82
1	3	(Estonia) Jüri Vips	63
1	4	(New Zealand) Marcus Armstrong	56
4	5	(United Kingdom) Max Fewtrell	37

Teams' Championship standings

	Pos	Team	Points
	1	(Italy) Prema Racing	228
	2	(France) ART Grand Prix	76
1	3	(United Kingdom) Hitech Grand Prix	71
1	4	(Italy) Trident	50
1	5	(Germany) HWA Racelab	39

- Note: Only the top five positions are included for both sets of standings.

== See also ==
- 2019 Austrian Grand Prix
- 2019 Spielberg Formula 2 round

Previous round: 2019 Le Castellet Formula 3 round	FIA Formula 3 Championship; 2019 season	Next round: 2019 Silverstone Formula 3 round
Previous round: 2018 Spielberg GP3 Series round	Spielberg Formula 3 round	Next round: 2020 Spielberg Formula 3 round
