= Julien Falchero =

French racing driver

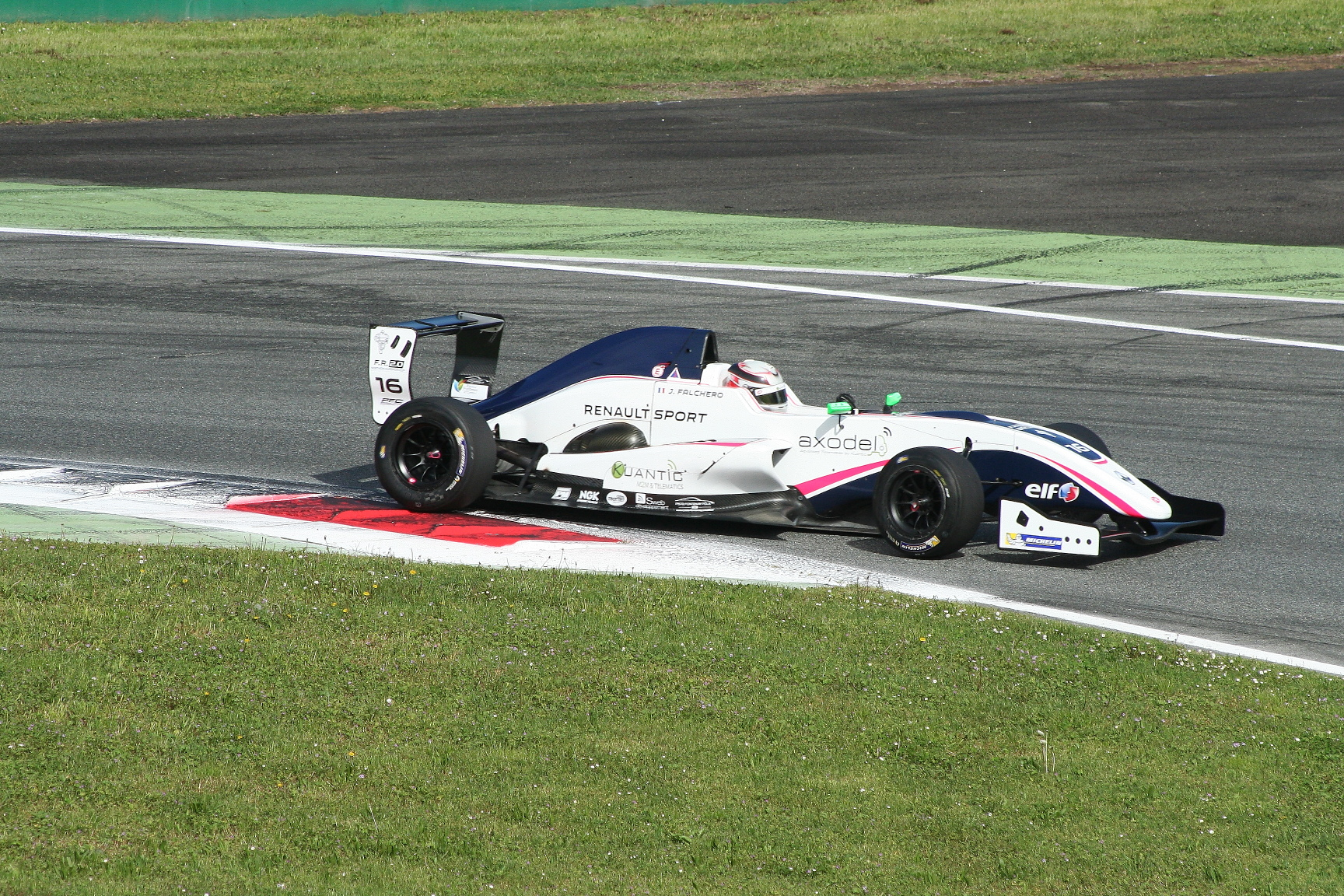
- Nationality: (France) French
- Born: Julien Albert Claude Falchero; 2 March 1997 (age 29) Valence, France

GP3 Series career
- Debut season: 2017
- Current team: Arden International
- Categorisation: FIA Silver
- Car number: 15
- Former teams: Campos Racing
- Starts: 29
- Wins: 0
- Poles: 0
- Fastest laps: 0
- Best finish: 15th in 2017

Previous series
- 2016 2015-16 2015: Formula Renault 2.0 NEC; Eurocup Formula Renault 2.0; Formula Renault 2.0 Alps

Julien Albert Claude Falchero (born 2 March 1997) is a French former racing driver.

== Career ==
=== GP3 Series ===
In December 2016, Falchero partook in post-season testing with Campos Racing. He was signed to the team the following month.

== Racing record ==
=== Career summary ===
Season	Series	Team	Races	Wins	Poles	F/Laps	Podiums	Points	Position
2015	V de V Challenge Monoplace	GSK Grand Prix	16	1	0	0	7	474.5	**2nd**
2015	Formula Renault 2.0 Alps	GSK Grand Prix	2	0	0	0	0	0	NC†
2015	Eurocup Formula Renault 2.0	GSK Grand Prix	3	0	0	0	0	0	NC†
2016	Eurocup Formula Renault 2.0	R-ace GP	15	0	0	0	0	32.5	13th
2016	Formula Renault 2.0 NEC	R-ace GP	15	0	0	0	0	124	13th
2017	GP3 Series	Campos Racing	14	0	0	0	0	16	15th
2017-18	MRF Challenge Formula 2000 Championship	MRF Racing	16	1	0	1	8	194	4th
2018	GP3 Series	Arden International	14	0	0	0	0	0	22nd
2018	European Le Mans Series - LMP2	G-Drive Racing	2	0	0	0	0	6.25	21st
2019	Indy Lights	Belardi Auto Racing	4	0	0	0	0	66	11th
2020	Le Mans Cup - LMP3	Team Virage	1	0	0	0	0	0	NC
2021	European Le Mans Series - LMP2	Inter Europol Competition	1	0	0	0	1	15	19th

^{†} As Falchero was a guest driver, he was ineligible for points.

=== Complete Formula Renault 2.0 NEC results ===
(key) (Races in bold indicate pole position) (Races in italics indicate fastest lap)

Year	Entrant	1	2	3	4	5	6	7	8	9	10	11	12	13	14	15	DC	Points
2016	R-ace GP	MNZ; 1 Ret	MNZ; 2; 11	SIL; 1; 8	SIL; 2; 6	HUN; 1 Ret	HUN; 2; 16	SPA; 1; 8	SPA; 2; 12	ASS; 1; 16	ASS; 2; 16	NÜR; 1; 11	NÜR; 2; 7	HOC; 1; 7	HOC; 2; 16	HOC; 3; 10	13th	124

=== Complete Eurocup Formula Renault 2.0 results ===
(key) (Races in bold indicate pole position; races in italics indicate fastest lap)

Year	Entrant	1	2	3	4	5	6	7	8	9	10	11	12	13	14	15	16	17	DC	Points
2015	GSK Grand Prix	ALC; 1	ALC; 2	ALC; 3	SPA; 1	SPA; 2	HUN; 1	HUN; 2	SIL; 1	SIL; 2	SIL; 3	NÜR; 1	NÜR; 2	LMS; 1	LMS; 2	JER; 1; 18	JER; 2; 18	JER; 3; 22	NC†	0
2016	R-ace GP	ALC; 1; 15	ALC; 2; 11	ALC; 3; 7	MON; 1; 10	MNZ; 1; 13	MNZ; 2; 9	MNZ; 3; 11	RBR; 1; 7	RBR; 2; 16	LEC; 1; 9	LEC; 2; 12	SPA; 1; 10	SPA; 2; 7	EST; 1; 12	EST; 2; 12			13th	32.5

† As Falchero was a guest driver, he was ineligible for points

=== Complete GP3 Series results ===
(key) (Races in bold indicate pole position) (Races in italics indicate fastest lap)

Year	Entrant	1	2	3	4	5	6	7	8	9	10	11	12	13	14	15	16	17	18	Pos	Points
2017	Campos Racing	CAT; FEA; 11	CAT; SPR; 10	RBR; FEA; 15	RBR; SPR; 11	SIL; FEA; 10	SIL; SPR; Ret	HUN; FEA; 13	HUN; SPR; Ret	SPA; FEA; 8	SPA; SPR; 5	MNZ; FEA; 8	MNZ; SPR; C	JER; FEA; 10	JER; SPR; 9	YMC; FEA; DNS	YMC; SPR; 16			15th	16
2018	Arden International	CAT; FEA; 14	CAT; SPR; 11	LEC; FEA; 16	LEC; SPR; 15	RBR; FEA; 15	RBR; SPR; 14	SIL; FEA; Ret	SIL; SPR; Ret	HUN; FEA; 15	HUN; SPR; 15	SPA; FEA; 16	SPA; SPR; 14	MNZ; FEA; Ret	MNZ; SPR; 13	SOC; FEA	SOC; SPR	YMC; FEA	YMC; SPR	22nd	0

=== Complete European Le Mans Series results ===
Year	Entrant	Class	Chassis	Engine	1	2	3	4	5	6	Rank	Points
2018	G-Drive Racing	LMP2	Oreca 07	Gibson GK428 4.2 L V8	LEC	MNZ	RBR	SIL	SPA; 11‡	ALG; 7	21st	6.25
2021	Inter Europol Competition	LMP3	Ligier JS P320	Nissan VK56DE 5.6L V8	CAT; 3	RBR	LEC	MNZ	SPA	ALG	19th	15

^{‡} Half points awarded as less than 75% of race distance was completed.

=== American open-wheel racing results ===
(key)

==== Indy Lights ====
Year	Team	1	2	3	4	5	6	7	8	9	10	11	12	13	14	15	16	17	18	Rank	Points
2019	Belardi Auto Racing	STP; 8	STP; 5	COA; 4	COA; 5	IMS	IMS	INDY	RDA	RDA	TOR	TOR	MOH	MOH	GTW	POR	POR	LAG	LAG	11th	66
