= 2019 Barcelona Formula 3 round =

Motor racing competition

(Spain) 2019 Barcelona Formula 3 round
Round details
- Round 1 of 8 in the 2019 FIA Formula 3 Championship.
- Layout of the Circuit de Barcelona-Catalunya
- Location: Circuit de Barcelona-Catalunya, Montmeló, Catalonia, Spain
- Course: Permanent racing facility 4.655 km (2.892 mi)

Feature Race
- Date: 11 May 2019
- Laps: 22
Pole position
Driver	(Russia) Robert Shwartzman	Prema Racing
Time	1:31.975	
Podium
First	(Russia) Robert Shwartzman	Prema Racing
Second	(Denmark) Christian Lundgaard	ART Grand Prix
Third	(New Zealand) Marcus Armstrong	Prema Racing
Fastest lap
Driver	(Denmark) Christian Lundgaard	ART Grand Prix
- Time: 1:35.209 (on lap 22)

Sprint Race
- Date: 12 May 2019
- Laps: 22
Podium
First	(India) Jehan Daruvala	Prema Racing
Second	(Estonia) Jüri Vips	Hitech Grand Prix
Third	(Finland) Niko Kari	Trident
Fastest lap
Driver	(India) Jehan Daruvala	Prema Racing
- Time: 1:34.711 (on lap 7)

The 2019 Barcelona FIA Formula 3 round was a motor racing event held on 11 and 12 May 2019 at the Circuit de Barcelona-Catalunya in Spain. It was the first round of the 2019 FIA Formula 3 Championship, and ran in support of the 2019 Spanish Grand Prix.

== Summary ==
=== Background ===
Following the 2018 GP3 Series, the series became the FIA Formula 3 Championship after merging with the FIA Formula 3 European Championship.

The round saw the début of the new Dallara F3 2019 chassis. The new chassis uses the same Mecachrome 3.4 litre (207 cu in) naturally-aspirated V6 engine that powered its predecessor, the GP3/16, but the power output is slightly reduced. The chassis also uses Pirelli tyres, as its predecessor GP3 did, and features the "halo" device used for cockpit protection.

Ten teams were listed to compete in the inaugural season; Reigning GP3 champions ART Grand Prix, Campos Racing, Jenzer Motorsport, MP Motorsport and Trident were chosen from the GP3 Series teams, while Carlin, Hitech Grand Prix, and reigning European F3 champions Prema Racing were chosen from the Formula 3 European Championship. Both Carlin and Prema Racing had entries in the championship's sister series Formula 2, as did Charouz Racing System, who later formed a partnership with former Formula 1 team Sauber. The final entry went to HWA Racelab, who joined the championship after Mercedes-Benz left the Deutsche Tourenwagen Masters touring car championship to focus on their Formula E entry.

=== Qualifying ===
Prema Racing's and Ferrari Driver Academy member Robert Shwartzman became the first pole sitter of the series, ahead of ART's Christian Lundgaard and Prema teammate Marcus Armstrong.

=== Feature Race ===
At the start, Christian Lundgaard took the lead into turn one from Robert Shwartzman, with Marcus Armstrong in third place. Lundgaard led for the entire race and became the first race winner of the new championship, with Shwartzman and fellow Ferrari junior Marcus Armstrong completing the podium in third, giving Prema a double podium finish. However, on the cool-down lap, Lundgaard would be awarded a penalty for exceeding the Full Course Yellow speed limit, which would hand the win to Russian driver Shwartzman.

The only retirement of the race was Campos Racing's Alessio Deledda, who spun off on lap 14 at turn 12. Liam Lawson would also not be classified following a late pit-lane start having suffered a mechanical failure on the warm-up lap.

=== Sprint Race ===
Niko Kari, who returned to the championship with Trident after racing for MP Motorsport in GP3 and Formula 2 in 2018, qualified in reverse grid pole after finishing eighth in the first race. He was immediately overtaken at the start by the third Prema driver Jehan Daruvala, who competed in both GP3 and European F3 in 2018. The start saw four drivers eliminated following a collision at turns 1 and 2; Raoul Hyman, Ye Yifei, Jake Hughes, and Artem Petrov, which brought out the safety car. On lap 9, Fabio Scherer made contact with Bent Viscaal at turn 2 and Simo Laaksonen and Alex Peroni collided at the same turn, putting an end to both the Charouz and MP Motorsport drivers' respectively.

As Lundgaard did in the first race, Daruvala led the entire race and brought home a victory for Prema, with Red Bull Junior Jüri Vips in second and Kari third for Trident. The result gave Prema a 32 point lead over ART in the teams' championship, and Robert Shwartzman a 13 point lead over Lundgaard in the drivers' championship.

== Classification ==
=== Qualifying ===
Pos.	No.	Driver	Team	Time/Gap	Grid
1	28	(Russia) Robert Shwartzman	Prema Racing	1:31.975	1
2	3	(Denmark) Christian Lundgaard	ART Grand Prix	+0.108	2
3	26	(New Zealand) Marcus Armstrong	Prema Racing	+0.452	3
4	27	(India) Jehan Daruvala	Prema Racing	+0.554	4
5	31	(United States) Logan Sargeant	Carlin Buzz Racing	+0.685	5
6	5	(Finland) Simo Laaksonen	MP Motorsport	+0.780	6
7	1	(Germany) David Beckmann	ART Grand Prix	+0.854	7
8	2	(United Kingdom) Max Fewtrell	ART Grand Prix	+0.882	8
9	23	(Australia) Alex Peroni	Campos Racing	+0.888	9
10	14	(Japan) Yuki Tsunoda	Jenzer Motorsport	+0.900	10
11	21	(Estonia) Jüri Vips	Hitech Grand Prix	+0.901	11
12	19	(Finland) Niko Kari	Trident	+0.903	12
13	18	(Brazil) Pedro Piquet	Trident	+0.905	13
14	7	(Germany) Lirim Zendeli	Sauber Junior Team by Charouz	+0.959	14
15	6	(Netherlands) Richard Verschoor	MP Motorsport	+0.974	15
16	10	(Netherlands) Bent Viscaal	HWA Racelab	+1.035	16
17	8	(Switzerland) Fabio Scherer	Sauber Junior Team by Charouz	+1.047	17
18	20	(Italy) Leonardo Pulcini	Hitech Grand Prix	+1.128	18
19	4	(New Zealand) Liam Lawson	MP Motorsport	+1.175	19
20	30	(Brazil) Felipe Drugovich	Carlin Buzz Racing	+1.338	20
21	12	(Iran) Keyvan Andres	HWA Racelab	+1.455	21
22	22	(China) Ye Yifei	Hitech Grand Prix	+1.500	22
23	25	(Spain) Sebastián Fernández	Campos Racing	+1.533	23
24	17	(Canada) Devlin DeFrancesco	Trident	+1.570	24
25	9	(United Kingdom) Raoul Hyman	Sauber Junior Team by Charouz	+1.589	25
26	15	(Russia) Artem Petrov	Jenzer Motorsport	+1.739	26
27	16	(Germany) Andreas Estner	Jenzer Motorsport	+1.987	27
28	29	(Japan) Teppei Natori	Carlin Buzz Racing	+2.079	28
29	11	(United Kingdom) Jake Hughes	HWA Racelab	+2.198	29
—	24	(Italy) Alessio Deledda	Campos Racing	No time	30

=== Feature Race ===
Pos.	No.	Driver	Team	Laps	Time/Retired	Grid	Pts.
1	28	(Russia) Robert Shwartzman	Prema Racing	22	37:42.312	1	29 (25+4)
2	3	(Denmark) Christian Lundgaard	ART Grand Prix	22	+2.529^{1}	2	20 (18+2)
3	26	(New Zealand) Marcus Armstrong	Prema Racing	22	+3.426	3	15
4	1	(Germany) David Beckmann	ART Grand Prix	22	+4.432	7	12
5	2	(United Kingdom) Max Fewtrell	ART Grand Prix	22	+10.300	8	10
6	21	(Estonia) Jüri Vips	Hitech Grand Prix	22	+14.536	11	8
7	27	(India) Jehan Daruvala	Prema Racing	22	+14.928	4	6
8	19	(Finland) Niko Kari	Trident	22	+16.132	12	4
9	5	(Finland) Simo Laaksonen	MP Motorsport	22	+17.807	6	2
10	14	(Japan) Yuki Tsunoda	Jenzer Motorsport	22	+22.913	10	1
11	30	(Brazil) Felipe Drugovich	Carlin Buzz Racing	22	+25.576	20	
12	23	(Australia) Alex Peroni	Campos Racing	22	+25.932^{1}	9	
13	10	(Netherlands) Bent Viscaal	HWA Racelab	22	+29.348	16	
14	7	(Germany) Lirim Zendeli	Sauber Junior Team by Charouz	22	+30.237	14	
15	31	(United States) Logan Sargeant	Carlin Buzz Racing	22	+31.386	5	
16	25	(Spain) Sebastián Fernández	Campos Racing	22	+31.926	23	
17	11	(United Kingdom) Jake Hughes	HWA Racelab	22	+32.207	29	
18	15	(Russia) Artem Petrov	Jenzer Motorsport	22	+32.743	26	
19	6	(Netherlands) Richard Verschoor	MP Motorsport	22	+33.624	15	
20	20	(Italy) Leonardo Pulcini	Hitech Grand Prix	22	+33.756	18	
21	9	(United Kingdom) Raoul Hyman	Sauber Junior Team by Charouz	22	+38.164	25	
22	22	(China) Ye Yifei	Hitech Grand Prix	22	+40.024	22	
23	17	(Canada) Devlin DeFrancesco	Trident	22	+40.474	24	
24	29	(Japan) Teppei Natori	Carlin Buzz Racing	22	+42.717^{1}	28	
25	16	(Germany) Andreas Estner	Jenzer Motorsport	22	+43.385	27	
26	18	(Brazil) Pedro Piquet	Trident	22	+45.055	13	
27	8	(Switzerland) Fabio Scherer	Sauber Junior Team by Charouz	22	+50.378	17	
28	12	(Iran) Keyvan Andres	HWA Racelab	22	+1:07.412	21	
NC	4	(New Zealand) Liam Lawson	MP Motorsport	14	+8 Laps	19	
Ret	24	(Italy) Alessio Deledda	Campos Racing	13	Spun out	30	
Fastest lap set by (Denmark) Christian Lundgaard: 1:35.209

^1 Driver awarded a five-second penalty for exceeding the VSC delta.

=== Sprint Race ===
Pos.	No.	Driver	Team	Laps	Time/Retired	Grid	Pts.
1	27	(India) Jehan Daruvala	Prema Racing	22	40:29.021	2	17 (15+2)
2	21	(Estonia) Jüri Vips	Hitech Grand Prix	22	+2.121	3	12
3	19	(Finland) Niko Kari	Trident	22	+3.742	1	10
4	28	(Russia) Robert Shwartzman	Prema Racing	22	+4.266	8	8
5	26	(New Zealand) Marcus Armstrong	Prema Racing	22	+5.257	6	6
6	3	(Denmark) Christian Lundgaard	ART Grand Prix	22	+5.721	7	4
7	1	(Germany) David Beckmann	ART Grand Prix	22	+9.453	5	2
8	2	(United Kingdom) Max Fewtrell	ART Grand Prix	22	+13.914	4	1
9	14	(Japan) Yuki Tsunoda	Jenzer Motorsport	22	+15.897	10	
10	30	(Brazil) Felipe Drugovich	Carlin Buzz Racing	22	+16.591	11	
11	7	(Germany) Lirim Zendeli	Sauber Junior Team by Charouz	22	+17.135	14	
12	25	(Spain) Sebastián Fernández	Campos Racing	22	+17.740	16	
13	10	(Netherlands) Bent Viscaal	HWA Racelab	22	+18.155	13	
14	31	(United States) Logan Sargeant	Carlin Buzz Racing	22	+18.953	15	
15	29	(Japan) Teppei Natori	Carlin Buzz Racing	22	+20.601	24	
16	18	(Brazil) Pedro Piquet	Trident	22	+21.197	26	
17	4	(New Zealand) Liam Lawson	MP Motorsport	22	+22.570	29	
18	12	(Iran) Keyvan Andres	HWA Racelab	22	+24.456	28	
19	6	(Netherlands) Richard Verschoor	MP Motorsport	22	+24.832	19	
20	17	(Canada) Devlin DeFrancesco	Trident	22	+25.368	23	
21	20	(Italy) Leonardo Pulcini	Hitech Racing	22	+31.452	20	
22	16	(Germany) Andreas Estner	Jenzer Motorsport	22	+33.860	25	
23	24	(Italy) Alessio Deledda	Campos Racing	22	+38.702	30	
24	23	(Australia) Alex Peroni	Campos Racing	22	+47.540	12	
Ret	5	(Finland) Simo Laaksonen	MP Motorsport	8	Accident	9	
Ret	8	(Switzerland) Fabio Scherer	Sauber Junior Team by Charouz	8	Spun out	27	
Ret	22	(China) Ye Yifei	Hitech Grand Prix	0	Collision	22	
Ret	9	(United Kingdom) Raoul Hyman	Sauber Junior Team by Charouz	0	Collision	21	
Ret	11	(United Kingdom) Jake Hughes	HWA Racelab	0	Collision	17	
Ret	15	(Russia) Artem Petrov	Jenzer Motorsport	0	Collision	18	
Fastest lap set by (India) Jehan Daruvala: 1:34.711

== Standings after the event ==
Drivers' Championship standings

Pos	Driver	Points
1	(Russia) Robert Shwartzman	37
2	(Denmark) Christian Lundgaard	24
3	(India) Jehan Daruvala	23
4	(New Zealand) Marcus Armstrong	21
5	(Estonia) Jüri Vips	20

Teams' Championship standings

Pos	Team	Points
1	(Italy) Prema Racing	81
2	(France) ART Grand Prix	49
3	(United Kingdom) Hitech Grand Prix	20
4	(Italy) Trident	14
5	(Netherlands) MP Motorsport	2

- Note: Only the top five positions are included for both sets of standings.

== See also ==
- 2019 Spanish Grand Prix
- 2019 Barcelona Formula 2 round

Previous round: 2018 Yas Marina GP3 Series round	FIA Formula 3 Championship; 2019 season	Next round: 2019 Le Castellet Formula 3 round
Previous round: 2018 Barcelona GP3 Series round	Barcelona Formula 3 round	Next round: 2020 Barcelona Formula 3 round
