= Pulcini =

Pulcini is an Italian surname. Notable people with the surname include:

- Leonardo Pulcini (born 1998), Italian racing driver
- Robert Pulcini (born 1964), American filmmaker
