= Niko Kari =

Finnish racing driver (born 1999)

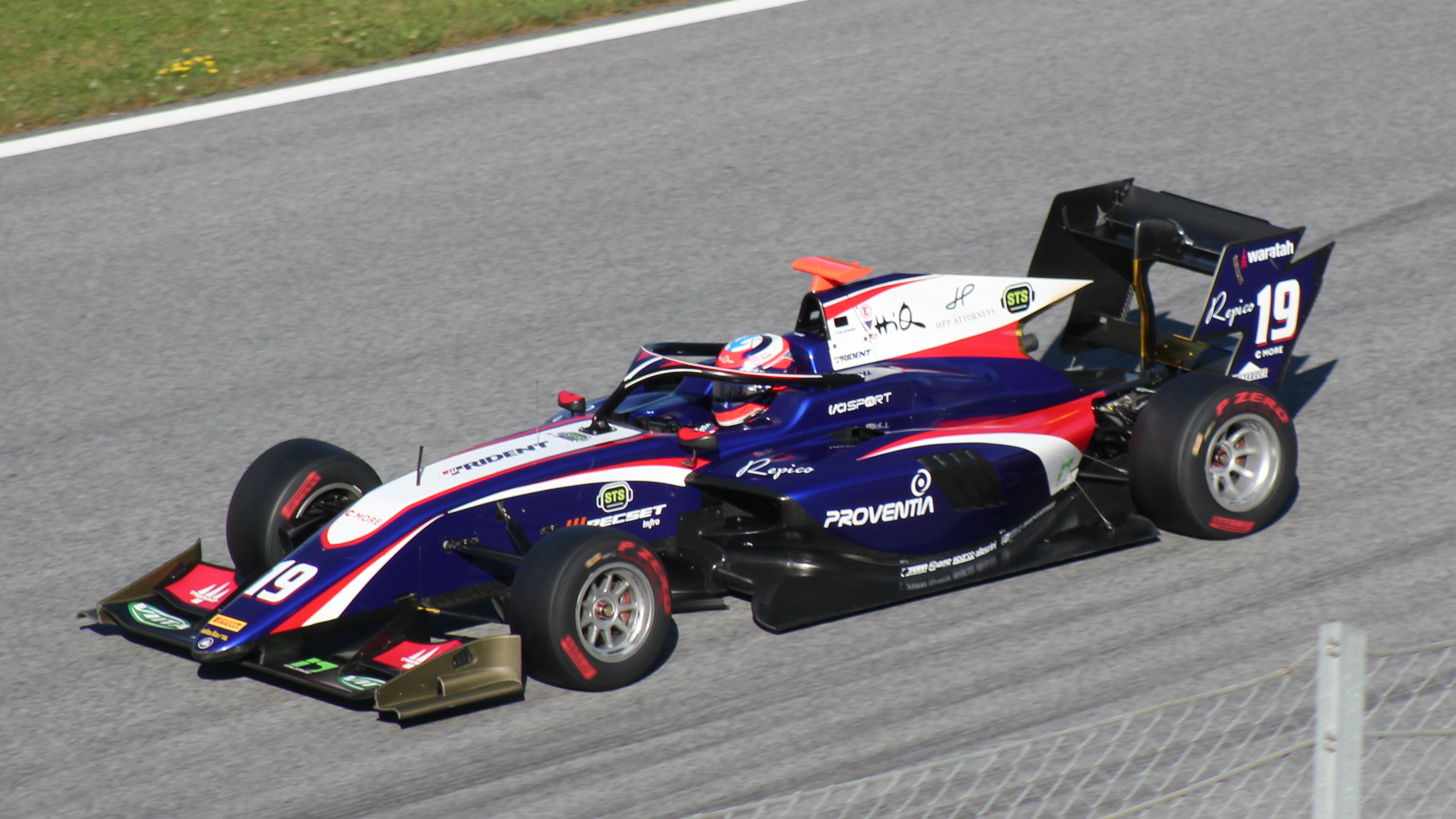
- Kari at the 2019 Spielberg Formula 3 round
- Nationality: (Finland) Finnish
- Born: Niko Petteri Kari; 6 October 1999 (age 27) Hyvinkää, Finland

FIA Formula 3 Championship career
- Debut season: 2019
- Categorisation: FIA Gold
- Car number: 24
- Former teams: Trident, Jenzer Motorsport
- Starts: 18
- Wins: 0
- Podiums: 2
- Poles: 0
- Fastest laps: 0
- Best finish: 12th in 2019

Previous series
- 2020 2018 2016–18 2016 2015: European Le Mans Series; FIA Formula 2 Championship; GP3 Series; FIA European Formula 3 SMP F4 Championship

Championship titles
- 2015: SMP F4 Championship

Niko Petteri Kari (born 6 October 1999) is a Finnish former racing driver who last raced in the FIA Formula 3 Championship with Jenzer Motorsport. He won his first single-seater championship, the 2015 SMP F4 Championship, in his debut year in car racing and is a former member of the Red Bull Junior Team.

== Career ==
=== Karting ===
Kari started karting in 2009 and took part in his first race in 2010. He raced in several national karting series in Finland from 2010 to 2013. In 2014, Kari moved to KF European where he finished fifth overall.

=== Junior formulae ===
Kari moved to single-seaters in 2015, starting in the new SMP F4 Championship. He won seven races and took the title with three races to spare. Kari moved to European Formula 3 Championship in 2016 with Motopark. He took victory at the first race at Imola after a late lunge on Lance Stroll and finished fifth in the rookie standings and tenth overall.

=== GP3 Series and Formula 3 ===
==== 2016 ====
In August 2016, Kari was also announced to take part in the GP3 rounds at Spa-Francorchamps with Koiranen GP, in place of Ralph Boschung. He retired from the first race, and finished 14th in the second, scoring no points.

==== 2017 ====
In November 2016, Helmut Marko confirmed Kari would move to the series full-time in 2017. In January, Kari was signed to Arden International. Kari finished the season with one race victory, one third-place finish, 63 points and tenth place in drivers' championship. He was dropped from the Red Bull Junior Team after the season.

==== 2018 ====
Kari continued to race in GP3 switching to MP Motorsport for the 2018 campaign. After 14 races into the season Kari was promoted to FIA Formula 2 Championship with MP Motorsport for the remainder of the 2018 season. As a result, Kari finished the season with three point scoring finishes, six total points, and a 17th place in the drivers' championship.

==== 2019 ====
For the rebranded 2019 F3 season, Kari would drive for Trident, and he would achieve two podiums, both third-place finished, in Barcelona and Sochi. He finished 12th in the championship with 36 points.

=== Formula 2 ===
Kari was promoted to FIA Formula 2 Championship with MP Motorsport for the last two weekends of the 2018 season replacing Ralph Boschung. He retired in both races held in Sochi, finished 15th in the first race of Abu Dhabi, and retired again in the season closing second race.

=== Formula One ===
In December 2015, Kari, along with his Motopark teammate Sérgio Sette Câmara, became a member of the Red Bull Junior Team and thus becoming a test driver of Scuderia Toro Rosso. In November 2016, it was confirmed Kari would remain a part of the Junior team. In August of the following year, Kari was dismissed from the program.

=== European Le Mans Series ===
For the 2020 European Le Mans Series, Kari signed with EuroInternational, in the LMP3 class. They finished fourth overall in the category, with a second, a third, two sixths, and a seventh-place finish during the year.

=== Return to racing ===
In 2022, following a year out of racing, Kari joined Jenzer Motorsport in FIA Formula 3, partnering Ido Cohen and fellow Finn William Alatalo for the opening Bahrain round. He finished the races in 26th and 14th, the former race was derailed by a puncture. Following Bahrain, however, he would be replaced by Federico Malvestiti. Kari ranked 30th in the standings overall.

== Karting record ==
=== Karting career summary ===
Season	Series	Team	Position
2010	ROK Cup International Final - Mini ROK		
2011	Finnish KF6 Challenge		1st
2012	17° South Garda Winter Cup - KF3		33rd
2012	WSK Master Series - KF3	Ward Racing	15th
2012	CIK-FIA European Championship - KF3	Ward Racing	40th
2012	41° Trofeo delle Industrie - KF3	Ward Racing	7th
2012	Viking Trophy - KF3		8th
2012	Finnish Championship - KF3		13th
2012	WSK Euro Series - KF3		33rd
2012	FIA Karting World Cup - KF3		13th
2012	WSK Final Cup - KF3		7th
2013	Finnish Championship - KF3		2nd
2013	WSK Super Master Series - KF Junior		10th
2013	18° South Garda Winter Cup - KF3		30th
2013	WSK Euro Series - KF Junior		16th
2013	CIK-FIA European Championship - KF Junior		21st
2013	CIK-FIA World Championship - KF Junior		8th
2014	WSK Champions Cup - KF		17th
2014	WSK Super Master Series - KF		5th
2014	CIK-FIA European Championship - KF	Ward Racing	5th
2014	CIK-FIA World Championship - KF	Ward Racing	13th

== Racing record ==
=== Racing career summary ===
Season	Series	Team	Races	Wins	Poles	F/Laps	Podiums	Points	Position
2015	SMP F4 Championship	Koiranen GP	21	7	4	9	19	449	**1st**
2016	FIA Formula 3 European Championship	Motopark	30	1	0	0	5	129	10th
2016	Masters of Formula 3	Motopark	1	0	0	0	1	N/A	**2nd**
2016	GP3 Series	Koiranen GP	2	0	0	0	0	0	26th
2017	GP3 Series	Arden International	15	1	0	1	2	63	10th
2018	GP3 Series	MP Motorsport	14	0	0	0	0	6	17th
2018	FIA Formula 2 Championship	MP Motorsport	4	0	0	0	0	0	24th
2019	FIA Formula 3 Championship	Trident	16	0	0	0	2	36	12th
2019	Formula Regional European Championship	KIC Motorsport	3	0	0	0	0	26	15th
2020	European Le Mans Series - LMP3	Eurointernational	5	0	0	1	2	55	4th
2022	FIA Formula 3 Championship	Jenzer Motorsport	2	0	0	0	0	0	30th

=== Complete SMP F4 Championship results ===
(key) (Races in bold indicate pole position) (Races in italics indicate fastest lap)

Year	1	2	3	4	5	6	7	8	9	10	11	12	13	14	15	16	17	18	19	20	21	DC	Points
2015	AHV; 1; 2	AHV; 2 Ret	AHV; 3; 2	MSC1; 1; 2	MSC1; 2; 1	MSC1; 3; 2	**SOC**; **1**; 1	SOC; 2; 1	**SOC**; **3**; 4	ALA; 1; 2	ALA; 2; 2	ALA; 3; 2	**AUD1**; **1**; 2	AUD1; 2; 2	**AUD1**; **3**; 1	MSC2; 1; 1	MSC2; 2; 1	MSC2; 3; 1	AUD2; 1; 2	AUD2; 2; 2	AUD2; 3; 2	1st	449

=== Complete FIA Formula 3 European Championship results ===
(key) (Races in bold indicate pole position) (Races in italics indicate fastest lap)

Year	Entrant	Engine	1	2	3	4	5	6	7	8	9	10	11	12	13	14	15	16	17	18	19	20	21	22	23	24	25	26	27	28	29	30	DC	Points
2016	Motopark	Volkswagen	LEC; 1; 8	LEC; 2; 16	LEC; 3; 15	HUN; 1; 2	HUN; 2 Ret	HUN; 3; 8	PAU; 1; 19	PAU; 2; 11	PAU; 3; 8	RBR; 1; 20	RBR; 2; 3	RBR; 3; 8	NOR; 1; 2	NOR; 2; 12	NOR; 3 Ret	ZAN; 1; 6	ZAN; 2; 11	ZAN; 3; 11	SPA; 1; 11	SPA; 2; 10	SPA; 3; 7	NÜR; 1; 8	NÜR; 2; 10	NÜR; 3; 3	IMO; 1; 1	IMO; 2; 9	IMO; 3 Ret	HOC; 1; 14	HOC; 2; 12	HOC; 3; 13	10th	129

=== Complete GP3 Series/FIA Formula 3 Championship results ===
(key) (Races in bold indicate pole position) (Races in italics indicate fastest lap)

Year	Entrant	1	2	3	4	5	6	7	8	9	10	11	12	13	14	15	16	17	18	Pos	Points
2016	Koiranen GP	CAT; FEA	CAT; SPR	RBR; FEA	RBR; SPR	SIL; FEA	SIL; SPR	HUN; FEA	HUN; SPR	HOC; FEA	HOC; SPR	SPA; FEA; Ret	SPA; SPR; 14	MNZ; FEA	MNZ; SPR	SEP; FEA	SEP; SPR	YMC; FEA	YMC; SPR	26th	0
2017	Arden International	CAT; FEA; 15	CAT; SPR; 14	RBR; FEA; Ret	RBR; SPR; 18	SIL; FEA; 5	SIL; SPR; 3	HUN; FEA; 9	HUN; SPR; 6	SPA; FEA; 9	SPA; SPR; 9	MNZ; FEA; 15†	MNZ; SPR; C	JER; FEA; 6	JER; SPR; 19	YMC; FEA; 1	YMC; SPR; 13			10th	63
2018	MP Motorsport	CAT; FEA; Ret	CAT; SPR; 6	LEC; FEA; DSQ	LEC; SPR; Ret	RBR; FEA; 11	RBR; SPR; 8	SIL; FEA; 11	SIL; SPR; Ret	HUN; FEA; Ret	HUN; SPR; Ret	SPA; FEA; 14	SPA; SPR; 12	MNZ; FEA; 10	MNZ; SPR; 10	SOC; FEA	SOC; SPR	YMC; FEA	YMC; SPR	17th	6
2019	Trident	CAT; FEA; 8	CAT; SPR; 3	LEC; FEA; 18	LEC; SPR; 24†	RBR; FEA; 11	RBR; SPR; 8	SIL; FEA; 18	SIL; SPR; 19	HUN; FEA; 14	HUN; SPR; 12	SPA; FEA; 19	SPA; SPR; Ret	MNZ; FEA; Ret	MNZ; SPR; 15	SOC; FEA; 3	SOC; SPR; 5			12th	36
2022	Jenzer Motorsport	BHR; SPR; 26	BHR; FEA; 14	IMO; SPR	IMO; FEA	CAT; SPR	CAT; FEA	SIL; SPR	SIL; FEA	RBR; SPR	RBR; FEA	HUN; SPR	HUN; FEA	SPA; SPR	SPA; FEA	ZAN; SPR	ZAN; FEA	MNZ; SPR	MNZ; FEA	30th	0

^{†} Driver did not finish the race, but was classified as he completed over 90% of the race distance.

=== Complete FIA Formula 2 Championship results ===
(key) (Races in bold indicate pole position) (Races in italics indicate points for the fastest lap of top ten finishers)

Year	Entrant	1	2	3	4	5	6	7	8	9	10	11	12	13	14	15	16	17	18	19	20	21	22	23	24	DC	Points
2018	MP Motorsport	BHR; FEA	BHR; SPR	BAK; FEA	BAK; SPR	CAT; FEA	CAT; SPR	MON; FEA	MON; SPR	LEC; FEA	LEC; SPR	RBR; FEA	RBR; SPR	SIL; FEA	SIL; SPR	HUN; FEA	HUN; SPR	SPA; FEA	SPA; SPR	MNZ; FEA	MNZ; SPR	SOC; FEA; Ret	SOC; SPR; Ret	YMC; FEA; 15	YMC; SPR; Ret	24th	0

=== Complete European Le Mans Series results ===
(key) (Races in bold indicate pole position; results in italics indicate fastest lap)

Year	Entrant	Class	Chassis	Engine	1	2	3	4	5	Rank	Points
2020	Eurointernational	LMP3	Ligier JS P320	Nissan VK56DE 5.6L V8	LEC; 6	SPA; 3	LEC; 7	MNZ; 2	ALG; 6	4th	55

Sporting positions
Preceded by Inaugural	SMP F4 Championship; Champion; 2015	Succeeded by Richard Verschoor
