= 2018 Budapest GP3 Series round =

Motor racing competition

(Hungary) 2018 Budapest GP3 round
Round details
- Round 5 of 9 rounds in the 2018 GP3 Series
- Location: Hungaroring, Mogyoród, Hungary
- Course: Permanent racing facility 4.381 km (2.722 mi)

GP3 Series

Race 1
- Date: 28 July 2018
- Laps: 22

Pole position
Driver	(France) Anthoine Hubert	ART Grand Prix
- Time: 1:31.409

Podium
First	(Russia) Nikita Mazepin	ART Grand Prix
Second	(Italy) Leonardo Pulcini	Campos Racing
Third	(France) Anthoine Hubert	ART Grand Prix

Fastest lap
Driver	(Russia) Nikita Mazepin	ART Grand Prix
- Time: 1:35.503 (on lap 4)

Race 2
- Date: 29 July 2018
- Laps: 17

Podium
First	(France) Dorian Boccolacci	MP Motorsport
Second	(United Kingdom) Callum Ilott	ART Grand Prix
Third	(France) Anthoine Hubert	ART Grand Prix

Fastest lap
Driver	(Australia) Joey Mawson (Note: Joey Mawson set the fastest lap, but did not finish in the top 10, so was ineligible to be the point-scorer for the fastest lap. Dorian Boccolacci was the point-scorer instead for setting the fastest lap of those finishing in the top 10.)	Arden International
- Time: 1:35.391 (on lap 5)

The 2018 Budapest GP3 Series round was the fifth round of the 2018 GP3 Series. It was held on 28 and 29 July 2018 at Hungaroring in Mogyoród, Hungary. The race supported the 2018 Hungarian Grand Prix.

== Classification ==
=== Qualifying ===
Pos.	No.	Driver	Team	Time	Gap	Grid
1	2	(France) Anthoine Hubert	ART Grand Prix	1:31.409		1
2	3	(Russia) Nikita Mazepin	ART Grand Prix	1:31.484	+0.075	2
3	18	(Italy) Leonardo Pulcini	Campos Racing	1:31.515	+0.106	3
4	4	(United Kingdom) Jake Hughes	ART Grand Prix	1:31.652	+0.243	4
5	1	(United Kingdom) Callum Ilott	ART Grand Prix	1:31.697	+0.288	5
6	7	(United States) Ryan Tveter	Trident	1:31.832	+0.423	6
7	8	(Germany) David Beckmann	Trident	1:31.911	+0.502	7
8	22	(France) Dorian Boccolacci	MP Motorsport	1:31.964	+0.555	8
9	16	(Australia) Joey Mawson	Arden International	1:32.046	+0.637	9
10	10	(United States) Juan Manuel Correa	Jenzer Motorsport	1:32.162	+0.753	10
11	6	(France) Giuliano Alesi	Trident	1:32.164	+0.755	11
12	20	(Mexico) Diego Menchaca	Campos Racing	1:32.172	+0.763	12
13	5	(Brazil) Pedro Piquet	Trident	1:32.212	+0.803	13
14	19	(Finland) Simo Laaksonen	Campos Racing	1:32.265	+0.856	14
15	9	(Colombia) Tatiana Calderón	Jenzer Motorsport	1:32.266	+0.857	15
16	14	(France) Gabriel Aubry	Arden International	1:32.768	+1.359	16
17	11	(Germany) Jannes Fittje	Jenzer Motorsport	1:32.944	+1.535	17
18	15	(France) Julien Falchero	Arden International	1:33.000	+1.591	18
19	24	(Finland) Niko Kari	MP Motorsport	1:35.070	+3.661	19

=== Feature race ===
Pos.	No.	Driver	Team	Laps	Time/Retired	Grid	Points
1	3	(Russia) Nikita Mazepin	ART Grand Prix	22	35:38.823	2	25+2
2	18	(Italy) Leonardo Pulcini	Campos Racing	22	+10.474	3	18
3	2	(France) Anthoine Hubert	ART Grand Prix	22	+12.735	1	15+4
4	8	(Germany) David Beckmann	Trident	22	+14.004	7	12
5	7	(United States) Ryan Tveter	Trident	22	+22.572	6	10
6	1	(United Kingdom) Callum Ilott	ART Grand Prix	22	+26.584	5	8
7	10	(United States) Juan Manuel Correa	Jenzer Motorsport	22	+29.194	10	6
8	22	(France) Dorian Boccolacci	MP Motorsport	22	+39.335	8	4
9	20	(Mexico) Diego Menchaca	Campos Racing	22	+39.719	12	2
10	14	(France) Gabriel Aubry	Arden International	22	+40.962	16	1
11	9	(Colombia) Tatiana Calderón	Jenzer Motorsport	22	+44.346	15	
12	5	(Brazil) Pedro Piquet	Trident	22	+45.028	13	
13	11	(Germany) Jannes Fittje	Jenzer Motorsport	22	+45.334	17	
14	19	(Finland) Simo Laaksonen	Campos Racing	22	+46.271	14	
15	15	(France) Julien Falchero	Arden International	22	+47.278	18	
16	4	(United Kingdom) Jake Hughes	ART Grand Prix	22	+1:34.317	4	
17	6	(France) Giuliano Alesi	Trident	20	Retired	11	
Ret	24	(Finland) Niko Kari	MP Motorsport	14	Retired	19	
Ret	16	(Australia) Joey Mawson	Arden International	13	Retired	9	

== Standings after the event ==
Drivers' Championship standings

Pos.	Driver	Points
1	(France) Anthoine Hubert	129
2	(United Kingdom) Callum Ilott	114
3	(Italy) Leonardo Pulcini	99
4	(Russia) Nikita Mazepin	98
5	(Brazil) Pedro Piquet	67

Teams' Championship standings

Pos.	Team	Points
1	(France) ART Grand Prix	376
2	(Italy) Trident	224
3	(Spain) Campos Racing	105
4	(Netherlands) MP Motorsport	63
5	(Switzerland) Jenzer Motorsport	39

- Note: Only the top five positions are included for both sets of standings.

== See also ==
- 2018 Hungarian Grand Prix
- 2018 Budapest Formula 2 round

== Notes ==
Previous round: 2018 Silverstone GP3 Series round	GP3 Series; 2018 season	Next round: 2018 Spa-Francorchamps GP3 Series round
Previous round: 2017 Budapest GP3 Series round	Budapest GP3 round	Next round: 2019 Budapest Formula 3 round
