= Pedro Piquet =

Brazilian racing driver

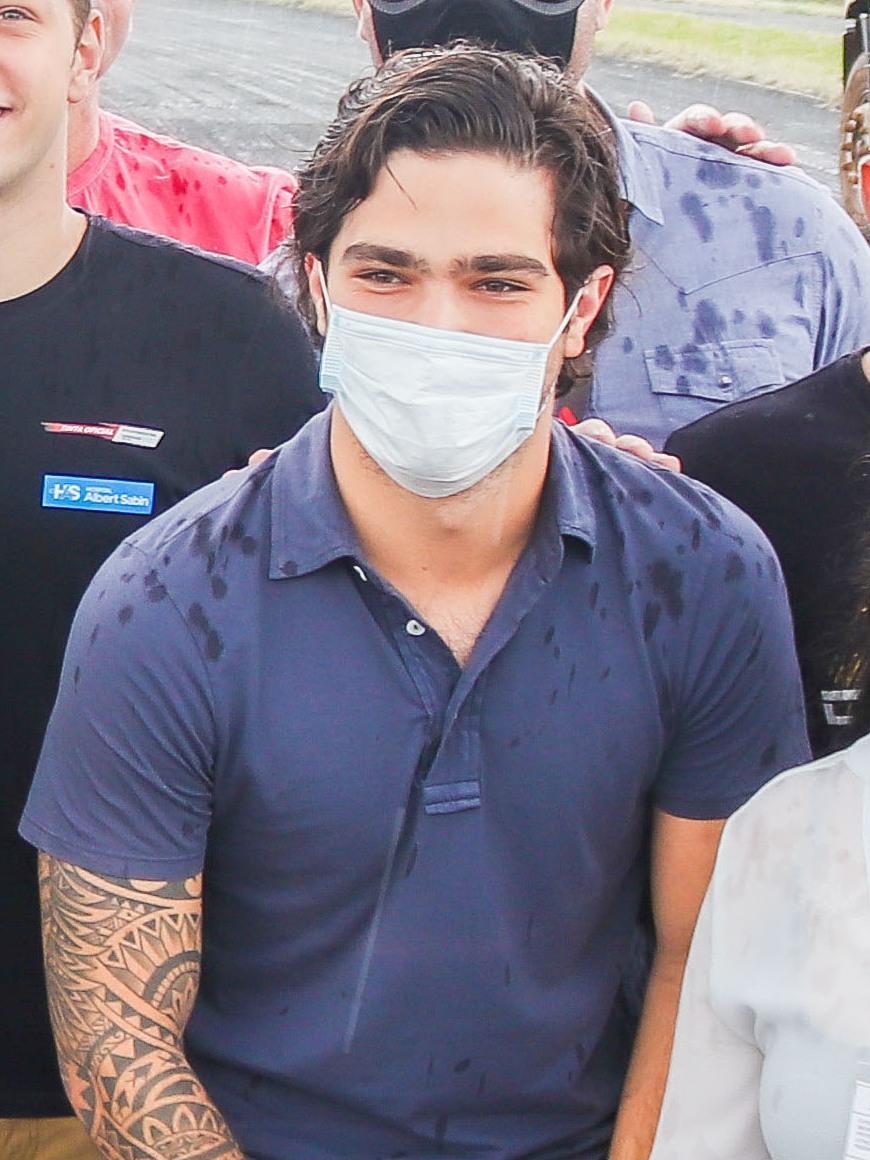
- Piquet in 2021
- Nationality: Germany (Note: Piquet is a Brazilian driver competing under a German licence.)
- Born: 3 July 1998 (age 28) Brasília, Brazil
- Relatives: Nelson Piquet (father); Nelson Piquet Jr. (half-brother); Kelly Piquet (half-sister); Julia Piquet (half-sister); Daniel Suárez (half-brother-in-law)

FIA Formula 2 Championship career
- Debut season: 2020
- Car number: 12
- Former teams: Charouz Racing System
- Starts: 24 (24 entries)
- Wins: 0
- Podiums: 0
- Poles: 0
- Fastest laps: 0
- Best finish: 20th in 2020

Previous series
- 2019 2018 2016-17 2014–2015: FIA Formula 3 Championship; GP3 Series; FIA European Formula 3 Championship; Fórmula 3 Brasil

Championship titles
- 2014–2015: Fórmula 3 Brasil

Pedro Estácio Leão Piquet Souto Maior (born 3 July 1998) is a Brazilian former racing driver. He is the son of three-time Formula One world champion Nelson Piquet and younger half brother of Formula E champion Nelson Piquet Jr. He is known for his successes in single-seater junior categories, including winning the 2014 and 2015 Brazilian Formula 3 Championships.

== Career ==
=== Karting ===
Piquet began his racing career in karts at the age of eight in 2006. During his karting career, he won numerous titles, including three Brazilian championships.

=== Toyota Racing Series ===
Piquet debuted in single-seater cars in the 2014 Toyota Racing Series. He struggled in the first six races, finishing no higher than 13th. His season was then brought to a premature end by licensing problems relating to his age.

In 2016, Piquet returned to the series, racing for M2 Competition for two seasons.

=== Brazilian Formula Three ===
Following his derailed first attempt at the Toyota Racing Series, Piquet returned to Brazil and began racing in Brazilian Formula Three in 2014. He had an extremely successful season, winning 11 of the 16 races and the championship. In 2015, he chose to continue racing in Brazilian Formula Three, winning it for the second time.

=== European Formula 3 ===
In 2016, Piquet joined Van Amersfoort Racing for the European Formula 3 championship. He competed for two seasons.

=== GP3 Series ===
In 2018, Piquet joined Trident Racing and competed In the GP3 Series, winning in Silverstone and Monza. He finished the season in sixth place.

=== FIA Formula 3 Championship ===
For 2019, Piquet stayed in GP3, but the championship turned into the FIA Formula 3 Championship, remaining with Trident. He took one win at Spa-Francorchamps and ended the championship in fifth, helping Trident to finish fourth in the team championship.

=== FIA Formula 2 Championship ===
in 2020, Piquet competed in F2 with Charouz alongside Louis Delétraz. He took his first points in the sprint race at Barcelona, finishing in seventh place. He also narrowly missed out on taking a podium in the Sakhir sprint race, having been third before suffering a mechanical issue on the final lap. Piquet left at the end of the season citing financial reasons.

=== Other racing experience ===
Alongside his single-seater racing, Piquet has participated in other events. In 2014, he entered and won the Brazilian Porsche GT3 Cup Challenge. He also entered one race in the Global Rallycross Championship, taking a podium, and one race in the Brazilian Mercedes-Benz Challenge C250 Cup. In 2015, he started two races in the Porsche Mobil 1 Supercup, scoring no points. He also raced again in the Brazilian Porsche GT3 Cup Challenge, this time scoring two podiums in six races. Piquet is competing in the ROK Shifter class in karting in 2023, he competes in the Florida Winter Tour, competing against the likes of Marijn Kremers and former GP3 driver Giorgio Carrara.

== Karting record ==
=== Karting career summary ===
Season	Series	Team	Position
2011	13ª Copa Brasil de Kart - Júnior Menor		2nd
2012	Super Kart Brasil - Júnior		18th
2012	15º Campeonato Sulbrasileiro de Kart - PJK/Júnior		8th
2013	FIA Karting Academy Trophy		7th
2019	Florida Winter Tour - Shifter ROK	Piquet Sports	38th

== Racing record ==
=== Racing career summary ===
Season	Series	Team	Races	Wins	Poles	FLaps	Podiums	Points	Position
2014	Fórmula 3 Brasil	Cesário F3	16	11	6	8	14	211	**1st**
2014	Brazilian Porsche GT3 Cup Challenge		1	1	1	1	1	0	NC†
2014	Global Rallycross Championship - GRC Lites	Piquet Sports	1	0	0	0	1	43	12th
2014	Brazilian Mercedes-Benz Challenge C250 Cup	Linardi Sports	1	0	0	0	0	7	24th
2014	Toyota Racing Series	M2 Competition	6	0	0	0	0	140	23rd
2015	Fórmula 3 Brasil	Cesário F3	16	14	8	14	14	213	**1st**
2015	Brazilian Porsche GT3 Cup Challenge		10	1	1	6	5	49	13th
2015	Porsche Supercup	The Heart of Racing by Lechner	2	0	0	0	0	0	NC (Note: As Piquet was a guest driver, he was ineligible to score points.)
2016	FIA Formula 3 European Championship	Van Amersfoort Racing	30	0	0	0	0	19	19th
2016	Masters of Formula 3	Van Amersfoort Racing	1	0	0	0	0	N/A	6th
2016	Macau Grand Prix	Van Amersfoort Racing	1	0	0	0	0	N/A	9th
2016	Toyota Racing Series	M2 Competition	15	2	1	3	7	710	5th
2017	FIA Formula 3 European Championship	Van Amersfoort Racing	30	0	0	0	1	80	14th
2017	Macau Grand Prix	Van Amersfoort Racing	1	0	0	0	0	N/A	6th
2017	Toyota Racing Series	M2 Competition	15	3	0	0	8	850	**2nd**
2018	GP3 Series	Trident	18	2	0	0	4	106	6th
2019	FIA Formula 3 Championship	Trident	16	1	0	1	3	98	5th
2020	FIA Formula 2 Championship	Charouz Racing System	24	0	0	0	0	3	20th
2022	Stock Car Pro Series	Motul TMG Racing	1	0	0	0	0	0	NC
2026	Stock Car Pro Series	Full Time Gazoo Racing	1	0	0	0	0	55	38th*

^{*} Season still in progress.

=== Complete Toyota Racing Series results ===
(key) (Races in bold indicate pole position) (Races in italics indicate fastest lap)

Year	Entrant	1	2	3	4	5	6	7	8	9	10	11	12	13	14	15	Pos	Points
2014	M2 Competition	TER; 1; 15	TER; 2; 13	TER; 3; 13	TIM; 1; 15	TIM; 2; 16	TIM; 3; 14	HIG; 1 DNS	HIG; 2 DNS	HIG; 3 DNS	HMP; 1	HMP; 2	HMP; 3	MAN; 1	MAN; 2	MAN; 3	23rd	140
2016	M2 Competition	RUA; 1; 7	RUA; 2; 2	RUA; 3 Ret	TER; 1; 4	TER; 2; 1	TER; 3; 10	HMP; 1; 3	HMP; 2; 3	**HMP**; **3**; 1	TAU; 1; 2	TAU; 2; 5	TAU; 3; 2	MAN; 1 Ret	MAN; 2; 8	MAN; 3; 15	5th	710
2017	M2 Competition	RUA; 1; 6	RUA; 2; 17	RUA; 3; 3	TER; 1; 3	TER; 2; 1	TER; 3; 5	HMP; 1; 2	HMP; 2; 3	HMP; 3; 4	TAU; 1; 5	TAU; 2; 1	TAU; 3; 5	MAN; 1; 1	MAN; 2; 3	MAN; 3; 4	2nd	850

=== Complete Formula 3 Brasil results ===
(key) (Races in bold indicate pole position) (Races in italics indicate fastest lap)

Year	Entrant	1	2	3	4	5	6	7	8	9	10	11	12	13	14	15	16	Pos	Points
2014	Césario F3	**TAR**; **1**; 1	TAR; 2; 1	**SCS**; **1**; 1	SCS; 2; 2	**BRA**; **1**; 1	BRA; 2; 1	INT; 1; 5	INT; 2; 3	**CUR1**; **1**; 1	CUR1; 2; 1	**VEL**; **1**; 1	VEL; 2; 4	**CUR2**; **1**; 1	CUR2; 2 Ret	GOI; 1; 1	GOI; 2; 1	1st	211
2015	Césario F3	**CUR1**; **1**; 1	CUR1; 2; 6	**VEL**; **1** Ret	VEL; 2; 1	**SCS**; **1**; 1	SCS; 2; 1	**CUR2**; **1**; 1	CUR2; 2; 1	**CAS**; **1**; 1	CAS; 2; 1	**CGR**; **1**; 1	CGR; 2; 1	**CUR3**; **1**; 1	CUR3; 2; 1	**INT**; **1**; 1	INT; 2; 1	1st	213

=== Complete Porsche Supercup results ===
(key) (Races in bold indicate pole position) (Races in italics indicate fastest lap)

Year	Team	1	2	3	4	5	6	7	8	9	DC	Points
2015	The Heart of Racing by Lechner	ESP	MON	AUT; 27	GBR	HUN; DSQ	BEL	ITA	USA	USA	NC	0

=== Complete FIA Formula 3 European Championship results ===
(key) (Races in bold indicate pole position) (Races in italics indicate fastest lap)

Year	Entrant	Engine	1	2	3	4	5	6	7	8	9	10	11	12	13	14	15	16	17	18	19	20	21	22	23	24	25	26	27	28	29	30	DC	Points
2016	Van Amersfoort Racing	Mercedes	LEC; 1; 11	LEC; 2; 14	LEC; 3 Ret	HUN; 1; 13	HUN; 2; 14	HUN; 3; 7	PAU; 1; 20	PAU; 2 Ret	PAU; 3; 10	RBR; 1; 19	RBR; 2 Ret	RBR; 3; 13	NOR; 1; 9	NOR; 2 Ret	NOR; 3 Ret	ZAN; 1; 13	ZAN; 2; 16	ZAN; 3; 13	SPA; 1; 18	SPA; 2; 6	SPA; 3; 14	NÜR; 1; 17	NÜR; 2; 9	NÜR; 3; 15	IMO; 1 Ret	IMO; 2; 12	IMO; 3; 14	HOC; 1; 16	HOC; 2; 17	HOC; 3; 15	19th	19
2017	Van Amersfoort Racing	Mercedes	SIL; 1; 9	SIL; 2; 18	SIL; 3; 11	MNZ; 1; 16	MNZ; 2 Ret	MNZ; 3; 7	PAU; 1; 7	PAU; 2; 13	PAU; 3; 8	HUN; 1; 17	HUN; 2; 13	HUN; 3; 14	NOR; 1; 2	NOR; 2; 6	NOR; 3 Ret	SPA; 1; 10	SPA; 2; 16	SPA; 3; 12	ZAN; 1; 7	ZAN; 2 Ret	ZAN; 3; 6	NÜR; 1 Ret	NÜR; 2; 17	NÜR; 3; 13	RBR; 1; 10	RBR; 2; 15	RBR; 3; 15	HOC; 1; 7	HOC; 2; 7	HOC; 3; 6	14th	80

=== Complete Macau Grand Prix results ===
Year	Team	Car	Qualifying	Quali Race	Main race
2016	(Netherlands) Van Amersfoort Racing	Dallara F312	21st	12th	9th
2017	(Netherlands) Van Amersfoort Racing	Dallara F317	13th	6th	6th

=== Complete GP3 Series/FIA Formula 3 Championship results ===
(key) (Races in bold indicate pole position) (Races in italics indicate fastest lap)

Year	Entrant	1	2	3	4	5	6	7	8	9	10	11	12	13	14	15	16	17	18	Pos	Points
2018	Trident	CAT; FEA; 9	CAT; SPR; Ret	LEC; FEA; 6	LEC; SPR; 2	RBR; FEA; 4	RBR; SPR; 2	SIL; FEA; 7	SIL; SPR; 1	HUN; FEA; 12	HUN; SPR; 9	SPA; FEA; 4	SPA; SPR; 5	MNZ; FEA; 7	MNZ; SPR; 1	SOC; FEA; 15	SOC; SPR; 11	YMC; FEA; 12	YMC; SPR; Ret	6th	106
2019	Trident	CAT; FEA; 26	CAT; SPR; 16	LEC; FEA; 3	LEC; SPR; 2	RBR; FEA; 6	RBR; SPR; 15	SIL; FEA; 6	SIL; SPR; 27 (Note: Driver did not finish the race, but was classified as they completed over 90% of the race distance.)	HUN; FEA; Ret	HUN; SPR; 27	SPA; FEA; 1	SPA; SPR; 6	MNZ; FEA; 5	MNZ; SPR; 5	SOC; FEA; 6	SOC; SPR; Ret			5th	98

=== Complete FIA Formula 2 Championship results ===
(key) (Races in bold indicate pole position) (Races in italics indicate points for the fastest lap of top ten finishers)

Year	Entrant	1	2	3	4	5	6	7	8	9	10	11	12	13	14	15	16	17	18	19	20	21	22	23	24	DC	Points
2020	Charouz Racing System	RBR; FEA; 13	RBR; SPR; 13	RBR; FEA; 18	RBR; SPR; 14	HUN; FEA; 14	HUN; SPR; 15	SIL; FEA; 11	SIL; SPR; 17	SIL; FEA; 21	SIL; SPR; 16	CAT; FEA; 14	CAT; SPR; 7	SPA; FEA; 12	SPA; SPR; 12	MNZ; FEA; 12	MNZ; SPR; 17	MUG; FEA; 13	MUG; SPR; 12	SOC; FEA; 17	SOC; SPR; 9	BHR; FEA; 11	BHR; SPR; 19	BHR; FEA; 10	BHR; SPR; 11	20th	3

=== Complete Stock Car Pro Series results ===
(key) (Races in bold indicate pole position) (Races in italics indicate fastest lap)

Year	Team	Car	1	2	3	4	5	6	7	8	9	10	11	12	13	14	15	16	17	18	19	20	21	22	23	Pos	Points
2022	Motul TMG Racing	Toyota Corolla	INT; 1; 19	GOI; 1	GOI; 2	RIO; 1	RIO; 2	VCA; 1	VCA; 2	BRA; 1	BRA; 2	BRA; 1	BRA; 2	INT; 1	INT; 2	SCZ; 1	SCZ; 2	VCA; 1	VCA; 2	GOI; 1	GOI; 2	GOI; 1	GOI; 2	BRA; 1	BRA; 2	NC†	0†
2026	Full Time Gazoo Racing	Toyota Corolla Cross	CRS; 1	CRS; 2	CAS; 1	CAS; 2	INT; 1	INT; 2	GOI; 1	GOI; 2	CUI; 1	CUI; 2	VCA; 1	VCA; 2	SCZ; 1	SCZ; 2	CRS; 1	CRS; 2	BRA; 1; 6	CAS; 1	CAS; 2	VEL; 1	VEL; 2	INT; 1	INT; 2	38th*	55*

^{†} As Piquet was a guest driver, he was ineligible for points. ^{*} Season still in progress.

== Notes ==
Sporting positions
Preceded by Ricardo Zonta (1995)	Fórmula 3 Brasil; Champion; 2014-2015	Succeeded by Matheus Iorio
