= 2020 Barcelona Formula 3 round =

Motor racing event

(Spain) 2020 Barcelona Formula 3 round
Round details
- Round 6 of 9 in the 2020 FIA Formula 3 Championship.
- Layout of the Barcelona Circuit
- Location: Circuit de Barcelona-Catalunya, Montmeló, Catalonia, Spain
- Course: Permanent racing facility 4.655 km (2.892 mi)

Feature Race
- Date: 15 August 2020
- Laps: 22
Pole position
Driver	(United States) Logan Sargeant	Prema Racing
Time	1:32.974	
Podium
First	(United Kingdom) Jake Hughes	HWA Racelab
Second	(New Zealand) Liam Lawson	Hitech Grand Prix
Third	(United States) Logan Sargeant	Prema Racing
Fastest lap
Driver	(United Kingdom) Jake Hughes	HWA Racelab
- Time: 1:35.862 (on lap 13)

Sprint Race
- Date: 16 August 2020
- Laps: 22
Podium
First	(Australia) Oscar Piastri	Prema Racing
Second	(Australia) Alex Peroni	Campos Racing
Third	(Italy) Matteo Nannini	Jenzer Motorsport
Fastest lap
Driver	(Norway) Dennis Hauger	Hitech Grand Prix
- Time: 1:35.706 (on lap 5)

The 2020 Barcelona FIA Formula 3 round is a motor racing event held on 15 and 16 August 2020 at the Circuit de Barcelona-Catalunya in Montmeló, Catalonia, Spain. It was the sixth round of the 2020 FIA Formula 3 Championship, and ran in support of the 2020 Spanish Grand Prix.

== Entries ==
After having replaced Enaam Ahmed for the rounds at Silverstone, Ben Barnicoat returned to the British GT Championship with McLaren. The Brit was replaced by one-time F3 race winner Leonardo Pulcini.

== Classification ==
=== Qualifying ===
The Qualifying session took place on 14 August 2020, with Logan Sargeant scoring pole position for the third weekend in a row.

Pos.	No.	Driver	Team	Time/Gap	Grid
1	3	(United States) Logan Sargeant	Prema Racing	1:32.974	1
2	15	(United Kingdom) Jake Hughes	HWA Racelab	+0.111	2
3	5	(New Zealand) Liam Lawson	Hitech Grand Prix	+0.143	3
4	1	(Australia) Oscar Piastri	Prema Racing	+0.197	4
5	9	(Venezuela) Sebastián Fernández	ART Grand Prix	+0.248	5
6	26	(France) Clément Novalak	Carlin Buzz Racing	+0.265	6
7	11	(Germany) David Beckmann	Trident	+0.345	7
8	7	(France) Théo Pourchaire	ART Grand Prix	+0.412	8
9	29	(Australia) Alex Peroni	Campos Racing	+0.433	9
10	10	(Germany) Lirim Zendeli	Trident	+0.438	13^{1}
11	17	(Netherlands) Richard Verschoor	MP Motorsport	+0.557	10
12	25	(Italy) Leonardo Pulcini	Carlin Buzz Racing	+0.614	17^{2}
13	22	(Italy) Matteo Nannini	Jenzer Motorsport	+0.628	11
14	8	(Russia) Aleksandr Smolyar	ART Grand Prix	+0.708	12
15	2	(Denmark) Frederik Vesti	Prema Racing	+0.711	14
16	14	(Brazil) Enzo Fittipaldi	HWA Racelab	+0.788	15
17	16	(Australia) Jack Doohan	HWA Racelab	+0.808	16
18	28	(United States) Cameron Das	Carlin Buzz Racing	+0.852	18
19	23	(Czech Republic) Roman Staněk	Charouz Racing System	+0.900	19
20	19	(Austria) Lukas Dunner	MP Motorsport	+0.918	20
21	12	(United Kingdom) Olli Caldwell	Trident	+0.937	21
22	4	(United Kingdom) Max Fewtrell	Hitech Grand Prix	+0.960	22
23	18	(Netherlands) Bent Viscaal	MP Motorsport	+0.963	23
24	6	(Norway) Dennis Hauger	Hitech Grand Prix	+1.002	24
25	20	(Australia) Calan Williams	Jenzer Motorsport	+1.030	25
26	25	(Germany) David Schumacher	Charouz Racing System	+1.051	26
27	21	(Italy) Federico Malvestiti	Jenzer Motorsport	+1.214	27
28	24	(Brazil) Igor Fraga	Charouz Racing System	+1.299	28
29	31	(Germany) Sophia Flörsch	Campos Racing	+1.543	29
30	30	(Italy) Alessio Deledda	Campos Racing	+2.207	30^{3}

Notes：

- ^1 - Lirim Zendeli was handed a three-place drop, after he was found to have unnecessarily impeded Alex Peroni at the entry to Turn 7.
- ^2 - Leonardo Pulcini was given a five-place drop for having gotten in the way of Richard Verschoor at Turn 1.
- ^3 - Alessio Deledda was handed a 10-place grid drop for a tyre infringement.

=== Feature Race ===
Pos.	No.	Driver	Team	Laps	Time/Retired	Grid	Pts.
1	15	(United Kingdom) Jake Hughes	HWA Racelab	22	38:53.146	2	25 (2)
2	5	(New Zealand) Liam Lawson	Hitech Grand Prix	22	+2.388	3	18
3	3	(United States) Logan Sargeant	Prema Racing	22	+3.948	1	15 (4)
4	26	(France) Clément Novalak	Carlin Buzz Racing	22	+8.953	6	12
5	11	(Germany) David Beckmann	Trident	22	+9.826	7	10
6	1	(Australia) Oscar Piastri	Prema Racing	22	+10.222	4	8
7	7	(France) Théo Pourchaire	ART Grand Prix	22	+10.751	8	6
8	29	(Australia) Alex Peroni	Campos Racing	22	+12.172	9	4
9	17	(Netherlands) Richard Verschoor	MP Motorsport	22	+12.351	10	2
10	22	(Italy) Matteo Nannini	Jenzer Motorsport	22	+12.573	11	1
11	8	(Russia) Aleksandr Smolyar	ART Grand Prix	22	+14.832	12	
12	10	(Germany) Lirim Zendeli	Trident	22	+15.266	13	
13	14	(Brazil) Enzo Fittipaldi	HWA Racelab	22	+15.665	15	
14	16	(Australia) Jack Doohan	HWA Racelab	22	+16.445	16	
15	9	(Venezuela) Sebastián Fernández	ART Grand Prix	22	+17.282	4	
16	25	(Italy) Leonardo Pulcini	Carlin Buzz Racing	22	+17.892	17	
17	4	(United Kingdom) Max Fewtrell	Hitech Grand Prix	22	+18.925	22	
18	6	(Norway) Dennis Hauger	Hitech Grand Prix	22	+20.166	24	
19	28	(United States) Cameron Das	Carlin Buzz Racing	22	+21.563	18	
20	12	(United Kingdom) Olli Caldwell	Trident	22	+22.489	21	
21	19	(Austria) Lukas Dunner	MP Motorsport	22	+23.105	20	
22	23	(Czech Republic) Roman Staněk	Charouz Racing System	22	+24.159	19	
23	25	(Germany) David Schumacher	Charouz Racing System	22	+24.496	26	
24	24	(Brazil) Igor Fraga	Charouz Racing System	22	+25.776	28	
25	20	(Australia) Calan Williams	Jenzer Motorsport	22	+26.262	25	
26	21	(Italy) Federico Malvestiti	Jenzer Motorsport	22	+32.203	27	
27	31	(Germany) Sophia Flörsch	Campos Racing	22	+33.174	29	
28	30	(Italy) Alessio Deledda	Campos Racing	22	+33.711	30	
DNF	2	(Denmark) Frederik Vesti	Prema Racing	9	Mechanical	14	
DNF	18	(Netherlands) Bent Viscaal	MP Motorsport	1	Spun off	23	
Fastest lap set by (United Kingdom) Jake Hughes: 1:35.862 (lap 13)

=== Sprint Race ===
Pos.	No.	Driver	Team	Laps	Time/Retired	Grid	Pts.
1	1	(Australia) Oscar Piastri	Prema Racing	22	39:52.928	5	15 (2)
2	29	(Australia) Alex Peroni	Campos Racing	22	+1.176	3	12
3	22	(Italy) Matteo Nannini	Jenzer Motorsport	22	+2.028	1	10
4	17	(Netherlands) Richard Verschoor	MP Motorsport	22	+2.568	2	8
5	3	(United States) Logan Sargeant	Prema Racing	22	+3.002	8	6
6	7	(France) Théo Pourchaire	ART Grand Prix	22	+3.910	4	5
7	5	(New Zealand) Liam Lawson	Hitech Grand Prix	22	+4.823	9	4
8	14	(Brazil) Enzo Fittipaldi	HWA Racelab	22	+5.365	13	3
9	11	(Germany) David Beckmann	Trident	22	+5.878	6	2
10	15	(United Kingdom) Jake Hughes	HWA Racelab	22	+6.613	10	1
11	26	(France) Clément Novalak	Carlin Buzz Racing	22	+7.216	7	
12	8	(Russia) Aleksandr Smolyar	ART Grand Prix	22	+7.752	11	
13	9	(Venezuela) Sebastián Fernández	ART Grand Prix	22	+11.107	15	
14	20	(Australia) Calan Williams	Jenzer Motorsport	22	+12.368	25	
15	16	(Australia) Jack Doohan	HWA Racelab	22	+13.139	14	
16	10	(Germany) Lirim Zendeli	Trident	22	+13.630	12	
17	28	(United States) Cameron Das	Carlin Buzz Racing	22	+14.411	19	
18	24	(Brazil) Igor Fraga	Charouz Racing System	22	+15.127	24	
19	23	(Czech Republic) Roman Staněk	Charouz Racing System	22	+15.677	22	
20	18	(Netherlands) Bent Viscaal	MP Motorsport	22	+16.109	30	
21	2	(Denmark) Frederik Vesti	Prema Racing	22	+18.950	29	
22	19	(Austria) Lukas Dunner	MP Motorsport	22	+20.839	21	
23	31	(Germany) Sophia Flörsch	Campos Racing	22	+23.092	27	
24	25	(Italy) Leonardo Pulcini	Carlin Buzz Racing	22	+33.108	16	
25	25	(Germany) David Schumacher	Charouz Racing System	22	+1:24.905	23	
26	6	(Norway) Dennis Hauger	Hitech Grand Prix	19	+3 laps	18	
DNF	21	(Italy) Federico Malvestiti	Jenzer Motorsport	15	Accident	26	
DNF	30	(Italy) Alessio Deledda	Campos Racing	2	Mechanical	28	
DNF	4	(United Kingdom) Max Fewtrell	Hitech Grand Prix	1	Collision	17	
DNF	12	(United Kingdom) Olli Caldwell	Trident	1	Collision	20	
Fastest lap set by (Norway) Dennis Hauger: 1:35.706 (lap 5)

== Standings after the event ==
Drivers' Championship standings

	Pos.	Driver	Points
	1	(United States) Logan Sargeant	131
	2	(Australia) Oscar Piastri	130
1	3	(New Zealand) Liam Lawson	99
1	4	(Germany) David Beckmann	94.5
1	5	(France) Théo Pourchaire	80

Teams' Championship standings

Pos.	Team	Points
1	(Italy) Prema Racing	331.5
2	(Italy) Trident	144.5
3	(France) ART Grand Prix	125
4	(United Kingdom) Hitech Grand Prix	118
5	(Netherlands) MP Motorsport	93

- Note: Only the top five positions are included for both sets of standings.

== See also ==
- 2020 Spanish Grand Prix
- 2020 Barcelona Formula 2 round

Previous round: 2020 2nd Silverstone Formula 3 round	FIA Formula 3 Championship; 2020 season	Next round: 2020 Spa-Francorchamps Formula 3 round
Previous round: 2019 Barcelona Formula 3 round	Barcelona Formula 3 round	Next round: 2021 Barcelona Formula 3 round
