= 2019 FIA Formula 3 Championship =

Inaugural season of the FIA Formula 3 Championship

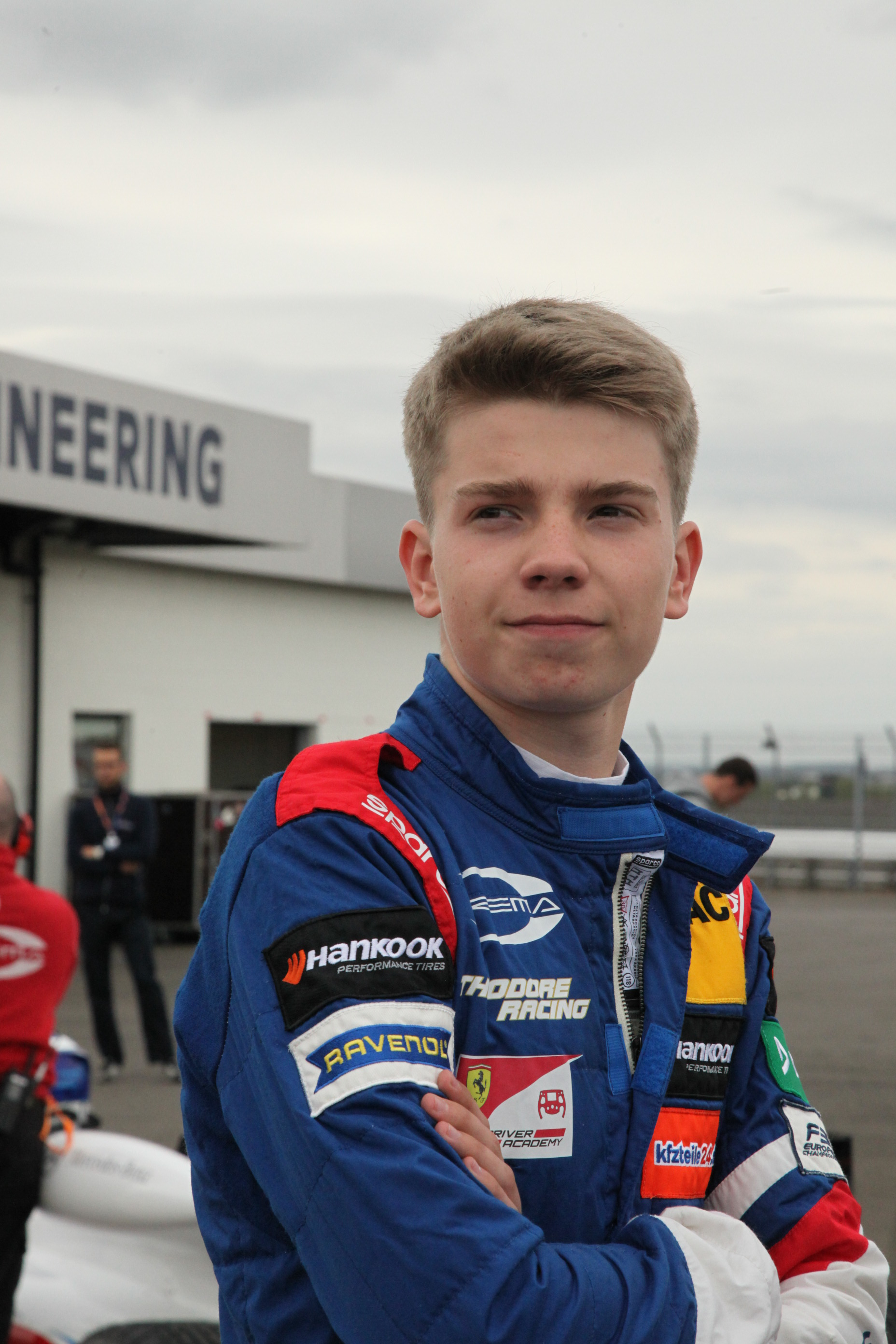
Robert Shwartzman became the first FIA Formula 3 Champion, while his team Prema Racing won the Teams' Championship.

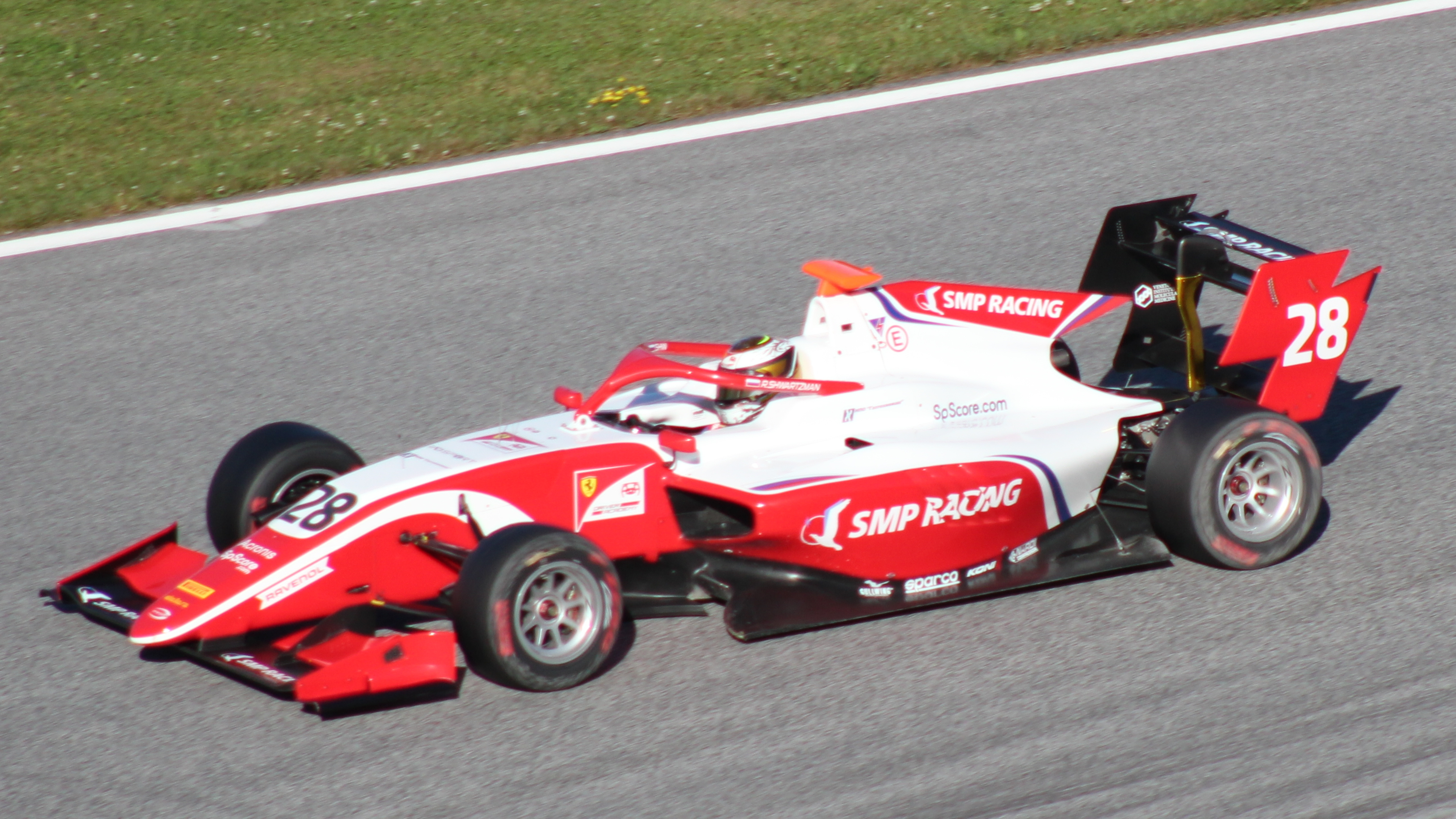
Prema Racing won the inaugural Teams' Championship.

The 2019 FIA Formula 3 Championship was the inaugural season of the FIA Formula 3 Championship, a multi-event motor racing championship for single-seat open-wheel formula racing cars. The championship featured drivers competing in 3.4-litre Formula 3 racing cars which conform to the technical regulations, or formula, of the championship. It ran in support of the Formula 1 World Championship and its sister series, the FIA Formula 2 Championship. It serves as the third tier of formula racing in the FIA Global Pathway. The championship was formed by the merger of the GP3 Series and the FIA Formula 3 European Championship in 2018, which brought the two championships under the umbrella of the Fédération Internationale de l'Automobile (FIA). The Formula One theme song composed by Brian Tyler, which debuted in the 2018 F1 season, would be used in Formula 3 broadcasts.

Prema Racing driver Robert Shwartzman won the championship title with one race to spare after collecting three race wins with six other podium finishes. Shwartzman dominated from the first race of the season, losing the drivers' championship lead only for one race to his teammate Jehan Daruvala. Daruvala, who finished third overall, was victorious at Barcelona and Le Castellet. Marcus Armstrong, another Prema driver, finished second and won races at Hungaroring, Spa and Sochi. He passed Daruvala by one point in the drivers' championship just in the final race of the season. Prema Racing became the inaugural teams' champions after the second Spa-Francorchamps race.

== Regulation changes ==
=== The car ===
For the championship's inaugural season, all teams were supplied with a new chassis package, named the Dallara F3 2019. It was still powered by a fuel-efficient 3.4 litre (207 cu in) naturally-aspirated direct-injected V6 engine developed by Mecachrome that also powered the GP3/16 chassis which was used in the championship's predecessor, the GP3 Series from 2016 to 2018. The chassis used tyres supplied by Pirelli and also featured the "halo" cockpit protection device used in the championship's sister series Formula One and Formula 2.

=== Technical regulations ===
The championship introduced a rule restricting the amount of downforce available during a race. Teams were free to run as much downforce as they choose during free practice and qualifying in order to find the ideal car setup, but the minimum and maximum allowable angle of the rear wing was specified by stewards ahead of the race.

Use of the Drag Reduction System (DRS) was unrestricted, whereas the championship's predecessor, GP3, restricted its use to six in the feature race and four in the sprint race.

== Teams and drivers ==
The following teams and drivers competed in the 2019 championship. As the championship is a spec series, all teams competed with an identical Dallara F3 2019 chassis and a bespoke tyre compound developed by Pirelli. Each car was powered by a 3.4 L (207 cu in) naturally-aspirated V6 engine developed by Mecachrome that was previously used in the Dallara GP3/16. Teams were required to enter three cars.

Entrant	No.	Driver name	Rounds
(France) ART Grand Prix	1	(Germany) David Beckmann	All
(France) ART Grand Prix	2	(United Kingdom) Max Fewtrell	All
(France) ART Grand Prix	3	(Denmark) Christian Lundgaard	All
(Netherlands) MP Motorsport	4	(New Zealand) Liam Lawson	All
(Netherlands) MP Motorsport	5	(Finland) Simo Laaksonen	All
(Netherlands) MP Motorsport	6	(Netherlands) Richard Verschoor	All
(Czech Republic) Sauber Junior Team by Charouz	7	(Germany) Lirim Zendeli	All
(Czech Republic) Sauber Junior Team by Charouz	8	(Switzerland) Fabio Scherer	All
(Czech Republic) Sauber Junior Team by Charouz	9	(United Kingdom) Raoul Hyman (Note: Raoul Hyman is a South African driver competing under a British licence.)	All
(Germany) HWA Racelab	10	(Netherlands) Bent Viscaal	All
(Germany) HWA Racelab	11	(United Kingdom) Jake Hughes	All
(Germany) HWA Racelab	12	(Iran) Keyvan Andres	All
(Switzerland) Jenzer Motorsport	14	(Japan) Yuki Tsunoda	All
(Switzerland) Jenzer Motorsport	15	(Russia) Artem Petrov	1
(Switzerland) Jenzer Motorsport	15	(Switzerland) Giorgio Carrara (Note: Giorgio Carrara is an Argentine driver competing under a Swiss licence.)	3, 5–7
(Switzerland) Jenzer Motorsport	15	(Italy) Federico Malvestiti	4
(Switzerland) Jenzer Motorsport	15	(Macau) Charles Leong	8
(Switzerland) Jenzer Motorsport	16	(Germany) Andreas Estner	All
(Italy) Trident	17	(Canada) Devlin DeFrancesco	All
(Italy) Trident	18	(Brazil) Pedro Piquet	All
(Italy) Trident	19	(Finland) Niko Kari	All
(United Kingdom) Hitech Grand Prix	20	(Italy) Leonardo Pulcini	All
(United Kingdom) Hitech Grand Prix	21	(Estonia) Jüri Vips	All
(United Kingdom) Hitech Grand Prix	22	(China) Yifei Ye	All
(Spain) Campos Racing	23	(Australia) Alex Peroni	1–7
(Spain) Campos Racing	23	(Germany) David Schumacher	8
(Spain) Campos Racing	24	(Italy) Alessio Deledda	All
(Spain) Campos Racing	25	(Spain) Sebastián Fernández	All
(Italy) Prema Racing	26	(New Zealand) Marcus Armstrong	All
(Italy) Prema Racing	27	(India) Jehan Daruvala	All
(Italy) Prema Racing	28	(Russia) Robert Shwartzman	All
(United Kingdom) Carlin Buzz Racing	29	(Japan) Teppei Natori	All
(United Kingdom) Carlin Buzz Racing	30	(Brazil) Felipe Drugovich	All
(United Kingdom) Carlin Buzz Racing	31	(United States) Logan Sargeant	All

=== Team entries ===
The merging of the GP3 Series and the FIA Formula 3 European Championship saw the FIA open up a tender process to prospective entrants. ART Grand Prix, Campos Racing, Jenzer Motorsport, MP Motorsport and Trident were selected from the GP3 Series entrants, while Carlin, Hitech Grand Prix and Prema Racing were chosen from the Formula 3 European Championship. Both Carlin and Prema Racing held entries in the championship's sister series Formula 2, as did Charouz Racing System. Charouz later formed a partnership with Sauber Motorsport, which at the time ran Alfa Romeo's team in Formula 1. The final entry was awarded to HWA Racelab, who joined the series after Mercedes-Benz withdrew from the Deutsche Tourenwagen Masters touring car championship. Formula 2 and GP3 regulars Arden International decided against entering Formula 3, while Motopark—who competed in the Formula 3 European Championship—were unsuccessful in their application and instead entered the Euroformula Open Championship.

=== Driver entries ===
Teppei Natori, who placed second in the 2018 F4 Japanese Championship, joined the series with Carlin Buzz Racing along with Euroformula Open champion Felipe Drugovich and Eurocup Formula Renault race winner Logan Sargeant. FIA Formula 3 European Championship race winners and Ferrari juniors Marcus Armstrong and Robert Shwartzman continued their collaboration with Prema Racing into the championship. Jehan Daruvala, who raced in Formula 3 European Championship with Carlin, also joined Prema Racing.

Honda promoted F4 Japanese champion and Red Bull Junior, Yuki Tsunoda to the category with Jenzer Motorsport. Artem Petrov joined the team from the Formula 3 European Championship and Andreas Estner from ADAC Formula 4. Red Bull Junior Jüri Vips, who also raced in the Formula 3 European Championship, moved to the new championship with Hitech Grand Prix. Leonardo Pulcini and Yifei Ye, who raced in GP3 with Campos Racing and Formula Renault with Josef Kaufmann Racing respectively, also joined Hitech Grand Prix.

After racing in the GP3 Series with Jenzer Motorsport and Trident, David Beckmann signed with ART Grand Prix, who also took on Renault Sport Academy members Max Fewtrell and Christian Lundgaard. Sebastián Fernández, Alex Peroni and Alessio Deledda joined Campos Racing after competing in the FIA European Formula 3 Championship with Motopark, Formula Renault Eurocup with MP Motorsport and Italian F4 with Technorace respectively.

Keyvan Andres Soori, who raced in European Formula 3 with Van Amersfoort Racing, joined the championship with HWA Racelab. He was partnered with Bent Viscaal, who was the runner-up in the 2018 Euroformula Open Championship driving for Teo Martín Motorsport, and Jake Hughes, who raced in GP3 with ART. After racing with them in GP3, Richard Verschoor joined MP Motorsport alongside Simo Laaksonen and reigning TRS champion and Red Bull Junior, Liam Lawson.

The Sauber Junior Team by Charouz entered the championship fielding reigning ADAC Formula 4 champion Lirim Zendeli, European Formula 3 racer Fabio Scherer and reigning F3 Asian champion Raoul Hyman. After scoring two race wins with them in the 2018 GP3 Series, Pedro Piquet reunited with Trident and was joined by Niko Kari and Devlin DeFrancesco, both of whom switched from MP Motorsport.

Mid-season changes

Artem Petrov left the championship after the first round due to a lack of funding. He was replaced by Giorgio Carrara for the round in Spielberg, as visa issues prevented him from racing in Paul Ricard, which reduced Jenzer's lineup to two drivers. Carrara was replaced with Federico Malvestiti for the Silverstone round. Carrara returned to the seat in Hungary. Hon Chio Leong replaced Carrara for the season finale at Sochi Autodrom.

Following an accident at the Monza round that left him with fractured vertebrae, Alex Peroni missed the final race at Sochi. He was replaced with David Schumacher.

David Beckmann withdrew from the final race of the championship for personal reasons.

== Calendar ==
A schedule of eight rounds was made to take place as part of the 2019 championship. The eight rounds were drawn from the 2018 GP3 Series calendar as the series was run on the Formula 1 support bill whereas the Formula 3 European Championship did not. The ninth round held at the Yas Marina Circuit in 2018 was omitted from the Formula 3 calendar to allow drivers the opportunity to compete in the 2019 Macau Grand Prix, which was announced during the season to be a non-championship round of the FIA Formula 3 Championship, as all teams and cars were at the event.

Round	Circuit	Race 1	Race 2
1	(Spain) Circuit de Barcelona-Catalunya, Montmeló	11 May	12 May
2	(France) Circuit Paul Ricard, Le Castellet	22 June	23 June
3	(Austria) Red Bull Ring, Spielberg	29 June	30 June
4	(United Kingdom) Silverstone Circuit, Silverstone	13 July	14 July
5	(Hungary) Hungaroring, Mogyoród	3 August	4 August
6	(Belgium) Circuit de Spa-Francorchamps, Stavelot	31 August	1 September
7	(Italy) Autodromo Nazionale Monza, Monza	7 September	8 September
8	(Russia) Sochi Autodrom, Sochi	28 September	29 September
NC	Guia Circuit, Macau	16 November	17 November

== Season report ==
=== Round 1: Spain ===
For the first race of the season it was Robert Shwartzman who took pole with Christian Lundgaard second.

== Results and standings ==
=== Season summary ===
Round		Circuit	Pole position	Fastest lap	Winning driver	Winning team	Report
1	R1	(Spain) Circuit de Barcelona-Catalunya	(Russia) Robert Shwartzman	(Denmark) Christian Lundgaard	(Russia) Robert Shwartzman (Note: Christian Lundgaard won the race, but was subsequently issued with a five-second time penalty for a virtual safety car (VSC) infringement.)	(Italy) Prema Racing	Report
1	R2	(Spain) Circuit de Barcelona-Catalunya		(India) Jehan Daruvala	(India) Jehan Daruvala	(Italy) Prema Racing	Report
2	R1	(France) Circuit Paul Ricard	(United Kingdom) Jake Hughes	(Brazil) Felipe Drugovich (Note: Felipe Drugovich set the fastest lap, but did not finish in the top 10, so was ineligible to be the point-scorer for the fastest lap. Yuki Tsunoda was the point-scorer instead for setting the fastest lap of those finishing in the top 10.)	(India) Jehan Daruvala	(Italy) Prema Racing	Report
2	R2	(France) Circuit Paul Ricard		(New Zealand) Marcus Armstrong	(Russia) Robert Shwartzman	(Italy) Prema Racing	Report
3	R1	(Austria) Red Bull Ring	(New Zealand) Marcus Armstrong	(Estonia) Jüri Vips	(Estonia) Jüri Vips	(United Kingdom) Hitech Grand Prix	Report
3	R2	(Austria) Red Bull Ring		(Denmark) Christian Lundgaard (Note: Christian Lundgaard set the fastest lap, but did not finish in the top 10, so was ineligible to be the point-scorer for the fastest lap. Jake Hughes was the point-scorer instead for setting the fastest lap of those finishing in the top 10.)	(United Kingdom) Jake Hughes (Note: Robert Shwartzman won the race, but was subsequently issued with a five-second time penalty for a collision with Marcus Armstrong.)	(Germany) HWA Racelab	Report
4	R1	(United Kingdom) Silverstone Circuit	(Estonia) Jüri Vips	(United States) Logan Sargeant (Note: Logan Sargeant set the fastest lap, but did not finish in the top 10, so was ineligible to be the point-scorer for the fastest lap. Jehan Daruvala was the point-scorer instead for setting the fastest lap of those finishing in the top 10.)	(Estonia) Jüri Vips	(United Kingdom) Hitech Grand Prix	Report
4	R2	(United Kingdom) Silverstone Circuit		(Russia) Robert Shwartzman	(Italy) Leonardo Pulcini	(United Kingdom) Hitech Grand Prix	Report
5	R1	(Hungary) Hungaroring	(Denmark) Christian Lundgaard	(Denmark) Christian Lundgaard	(Denmark) Christian Lundgaard	(France) ART Grand Prix	Report
5	R2	(Hungary) Hungaroring		(New Zealand) Marcus Armstrong	(New Zealand) Marcus Armstrong	(Italy) Prema Racing	Report
6	R1	(Belgium) Circuit de Spa-Francorchamps	(India) Jehan Daruvala	(Brazil) Pedro Piquet	(Brazil) Pedro Piquet	(Italy) Trident	Report
6	R2	(Belgium) Circuit de Spa-Francorchamps		(New Zealand) Marcus Armstrong	(New Zealand) Marcus Armstrong	(Italy) Prema Racing	Report
7	R1	(Italy) Autodromo Nazionale Monza	(Denmark) Christian Lundgaard	(Russia) Robert Shwartzman	(Russia) Robert Shwartzman	(Italy) Prema Racing	Report
7	R2	(Italy) Autodromo Nazionale Monza		(Estonia) Jüri Vips (Note: Jüri Vips set the fastest lap, but did not finish in the top 10, so was ineligible to be the point-scorer for the fastest lap. Richard Verschoor was the point-scorer instead for setting the fastest lap of those finishing in the top 10.)	(Japan) Yuki Tsunoda	(Switzerland) Jenzer Motorsport	Report
8	R1	(Russia) Sochi Autodrom	(Russia) Robert Shwartzman	(United Kingdom) Jake Hughes	(New Zealand) Marcus Armstrong	(Italy) Prema Racing	Report
8	R2	(Russia) Sochi Autodrom		(New Zealand) Marcus Armstrong	(Estonia) Jüri Vips	(United Kingdom) Hitech Grand Prix	Report
NC	QR	(Macau) Guia Circuit	(Estonia) Jüri Vips	(Estonia) Jüri Vips	(Estonia) Jüri Vips	(United Kingdom) Hitech Grand Prix	Report
NC	MR	(Macau) Guia Circuit	(Estonia) Jüri Vips	(United Kingdom) Jake Hughes	(Netherlands) Richard Verschoor	(Netherlands) MP Motorsport	Report

=== Scoring system ===
Points were awarded to the top 10 classified finishers in Race 1, and to the top 8 classified finishers in Race 2. The pole-sitter in Race 1 received four points, and two points were given to the driver who set the fastest lap inside the top ten in both races. No extra points are awarded to the pole-sitter in Race 2 as the grid for Race 2 is based on the results of Race 1 with the top eight drivers having their positions reversed.

Race 1 points

Position	**1st**	**2nd**	**3rd**	**4th**	**5th**	**6th**	**7th**	**8th**	**9th**	**10th**	**Pole**	**FL**
Points	25	18	15	12	10	8	6	4	2	1	4	2

Race 2 points

Points were awarded to the top eight classified finishers, excluding the fastest lap points which are given to the top ten classified finishers.

Position	**1st**	**2nd**	**3rd**	**4th**	**5th**	**6th**	**7th**	**8th**	**FL**
Points	15	12	10	8	6	4	2	1	2

=== Drivers' championship ===
Pos.	Driver	CAT (Spain)		LEC (France)		RBR (Austria)		SIL (United Kingdom)		HUN (Hungary)		SPA (Belgium)		MNZ (Italy)		SOC (Russia)		Points
Pos.	Driver	R1	R2	R1	R2	R1	R2	R1	R2	R1	R2	R1	R2	R1	R2	R1	R2	Points
1	(Russia) Robert Shwartzman	**1**	4	2	1	5	3	5	2	5	Ret	2	3	1	8	**2**	3	212
2	(New Zealand) Marcus Armstrong	3	5	6	6	**3**	19	3	4	8	1	8	1	21	14	1	2	158
3	(India) Jehan Daruvala	7	1	1	3	4	2	2	28†	11	7	**3**	5	2	13	5	14	157
4	(Estonia) Jüri Vips	6	2	4	17	1	6	**1**	15	4	4	5	21	Ret	11	8	1	141
5	(Brazil) Pedro Piquet	26	16	3	2	6	15	6	27†	Ret	27	1	6	5	5	6	Ret	98
6	(Denmark) Christian Lundgaard	2	6	Ret	15	26	17	7	5	**1**	5	4	4	**13**	9	14	9	97
7	(United Kingdom) Jake Hughes	17	Ret	**Ret**	7	7	1	9	Ret	3	3	21	Ret	6	3	7	4	90
8	(Italy) Leonardo Pulcini	20	21	Ret	12	9	5	4	1	7	2	7	7	10	6	4	16	78
9	(Japan) Yuki Tsunoda	10	9	7	9	16	11	14	7	9	6	6	2	3	1	12	25†	67
10	(United Kingdom) Max Fewtrell	5	8	Ret	18	2	4	19	12	2	24	9	Ret	14	21	11	11	57
11	(New Zealand) Liam Lawson	NC	17	9	5	14	25	8	3	16	9	12	19	7	2	18	8	41
12	(Finland) Niko Kari	8	3	18	24†	11	8	18	19	14	12	19	Ret	Ret	15	3	5	36
13	(Netherlands) Richard Verschoor	19	19	14	4	10	12	17	21	27†	17	17	11	4	4	10	7	34
14	(Germany) David Beckmann	4	7	10	Ret	15	10	11	6	28†	19	10	12	Ret	28†	WD	WD	20
15	(Netherlands) Bent Viscaal	13	13	5	20	13	Ret	22	20	19	10	20	14	17	27†	Ret	17	10
16	(Brazil) Felipe Drugovich	11	10	19	10	12	14	13	10	6	Ret	18	9	16	12	25	15	8
17	(Switzerland) Fabio Scherer	27	Ret	15	Ret	Ret	23	16	8	15	13	27	18	8	7	Ret	Ret	7
18	(Germany) Lirim Zendeli	14	11	Ret	16	8	7	15	9	Ret	20	22	22†	Ret	18	DNS	DNS	6
19	(United States) Logan Sargeant	15	14	12	8	22	26	26	13	10	8	13	Ret	9	10	15	10	5
20	(Australia) Alex Peroni	12	24	8	14	21	Ret	10	Ret	26	16	Ret	15	Ret	DNS			5
21	(China) Yifei Ye	22	Ret	13	22	20	Ret	12	11	18	22	15	10	Ret	19	13	6	4
22	(United Kingdom) Raoul Hyman	21	Ret	17	13	19	16	Ret	18	22	25	26	Ret	15	17	9	13	2
23	(Finland) Simo Laaksonen	9	Ret	20†	Ret	18	18	24	24	17	18	24	Ret	20	20	17	Ret	2
24	(Japan) Teppei Natori	24	15	Ret	Ret	Ret	22	25	16	20	Ret	11	8	11	29†	20	19	1
25	(Canada) Devlin DeFrancesco	23	20	21†	21	17	9	27	17	12	11	29	Ret	12	16	23	12	0
26	(Germany) Andreas Estner	25	22	11	11	23	20	23	22	21	15	23	17	22	24	24	18	0
27	(Spain) Sebastián Fernández	16	12	Ret	Ret	24	Ret	20	14	13	23	25	13	18	26	16	24†	0
28	(Iran) Keyvan Andres	28	18	DNS	19	27	13	21	26	23	14	14	16	19	22	19	23	0
29	(Italy) Alessio Deledda	Ret	23	16	23	25	24	Ret	25	24	26	28	20	23	25	21	22	0
30	(Switzerland) Giorgio Carrara					28	21			25	21	16	Ret	Ret	23			0
31	(Russia) Artem Petrov	18	Ret															0
32	(Germany) David Schumacher															22	20	0
33	(Macau) Charles Leong															Ret	21	0
34	(Italy) Federico Malvestiti							Ret	23									0
Pos.	Driver	R1	R2	R1	R2	R1	R2	R1	R2	R1	R2	R1	R2	R1	R2	R1	R2	Points
Pos.	Driver	CAT (Spain)		LEC (France)		RBR (Austria)		SIL (United Kingdom)		HUN (Hungary)		SPA (Belgium)		MNZ (Italy)		SOC (Russia)		Points

Key
Colour	Result
Gold	Winner
Silver	2nd place
Bronze	3rd place
Green	Other points position
Blue	Other classified position
Blue	Not classified, finished (NC)
Purple	Not classified, retired (Ret)
Red	Did not qualify (DNQ)
Red	Did not pre-qualify (DNPQ)
Black	Disqualified (DSQ)
White	Did not start (DNS)
White	Race cancelled (C)
Blank	Did not practice (DNP)
Blank	Excluded (EX)
Blank	Did not arrive (DNA)
Blank	Withdrawn (WD)
Text formatting	Meaning
**Bold**	Pole position point(s)
Italics	Fastest lap point(s)

Notes:

- † – Drivers did not finish the race, but were classified as they completed more than 90% of the race distance.

=== Teams' championship ===
Pos.	Team	No.	CAT (Spain)		LEC (France)		RBR (Austria)		SIL (United Kingdom)		HUN (Hungary)		SPA (Belgium)		MNZ (Italy)		SOC (Russia)		Points
Pos.	Team	No.	R1	R2	R1	R2	R1	R2	R1	R2	R1	R2	R1	R2	R1	R2	R1	R2	Points
1	(Italy) Prema Racing	26	3	5	6	6	**3**	19	3	4	8	1	8	1	21	14	1	2	527
1	(Italy) Prema Racing	27	7	1	1	3	4	2	2	28†	11	7	**3**	5	2	13	5	14	527
1	(Italy) Prema Racing	28	**1**	4	2	1	5	3	5	2	5	Ret	2	3	1	8	**2**	3	527
2	(United Kingdom) Hitech Grand Prix	20	20	21	Ret	12	9	5	4	1	7	2	7	7	10	6	4	16	223
2	(United Kingdom) Hitech Grand Prix	21	6	2	4	17	1	6	**1**	15	4	4	5	21	Ret	11	8	1	223
2	(United Kingdom) Hitech Grand Prix	22	22	Ret	13	22	20	Ret	12	11	18	22	15	10	Ret	19	13	6	223
3	(France) ART Grand Prix	1	4	7	10	Ret	15	10	11	6	28†	19	10	12	Ret	28†	WD	WD	174
3	(France) ART Grand Prix	2	5	8	Ret	18	2	4	19	12	2	24	9	Ret	14	21	11	11	174
3	(France) ART Grand Prix	3	2	6	Ret	15	26	17	7	5	**1**	5	4	4	**13**	9	14	9	174
4	(Italy) Trident	17	23	20	21†	21	17	9	27	17	12	11	29	Ret	12	16	23	12	134
4	(Italy) Trident	18	26	16	3	2	6	15	6	27†	Ret	27	1	6	5	5	6	Ret	134
4	(Italy) Trident	19	8	3	18	24†	11	8	18	19	14	12	19	Ret	Ret	15	3	5	134
5	(Germany) HWA Racelab	10	13	13	5	20	13	Ret	22	20	19	10	20	14	17	27†	Ret	17	100
5	(Germany) HWA Racelab	11	17	Ret	**Ret**	7	7	1	9	Ret	3	3	21	Ret	6	3	7	4	100
5	(Germany) HWA Racelab	12	28	18	DNS	19	27	13	21	26	23	14	14	16	19	22	19	23	100
6	(Netherlands) MP Motorsport	4	NC	17	9	5	14	25	8	3	16	9	12	19	7	2	18	8	77
6	(Netherlands) MP Motorsport	5	9	Ret	20†	Ret	18	18	18	24	17	18	24	Ret	20	20	17	Ret	77
6	(Netherlands) MP Motorsport	6	19	19	14	4	10	12	17	21	27†	17	17	11	4	4	10	7	77
7	(Switzerland) Jenzer Motorsport	14	10	9	7	9	16	11	14	7	9	6	6	2	3	1	12	25†	67
7	(Switzerland) Jenzer Motorsport	15	18	Ret			28	21	Ret	23	25	21	16	Ret	Ret	23	Ret	21	67
7	(Switzerland) Jenzer Motorsport	16	25	22	11	11	23	20	23	22	21	15	23	17	22	24	24	18	67
8	(Czech Republic) Sauber Junior Team by Charouz	7	14	11	Ret	16	8	7	15	9	Ret	20	22	22†	Ret	18	DNS	DNS	15
8	(Czech Republic) Sauber Junior Team by Charouz	8	27	Ret	15	Ret	Ret	23	16	8	15	13	27	18	8	7	Ret	Ret	15
8	(Czech Republic) Sauber Junior Team by Charouz	9	21	Ret	17	13	19	16	Ret	18	22	25	26	Ret	15	17	9	13	15
9	(United Kingdom) Carlin Buzz Racing	29	24	15	Ret	Ret	Ret	22	25	16	20	Ret	11	8	11	29†	20	19	14
9	(United Kingdom) Carlin Buzz Racing	30	11	10	19	10	12	14	13	10	6	Ret	18	9	16	12	25	15	14
9	(United Kingdom) Carlin Buzz Racing	31	15	14	12	8	22	26	26	13	10	8	13	Ret	9	10	15	10	14
10	(Spain) Campos Racing	23	12	24	8	14	21	Ret	10	Ret	26	16	Ret	15	Ret	DNS	22	20	5
10	(Spain) Campos Racing	24	Ret	23	16	23	25	24	Ret	25	24	26	28	20	23	25	21	22	5
10	(Spain) Campos Racing	25	16	12	Ret	Ret	24	Ret	20	14	13	23	25	13	18	26	16	24	5
Pos.	Team	No.	R1	R2	R1	R2	R1	R2	R1	R2	R1	R2	R1	R2	R1	R2	R1	R2	Points
Pos.	Team	No.	CAT (Spain)		LEC (France)		RBR (Austria)		SIL (United Kingdom)		HUN (Hungary)		SPA (Belgium)		MNZ (Italy)		SOC (Russia)		Points

Key
Colour	Result
Gold	Winner
Silver	2nd place
Bronze	3rd place
Green	Other points position
Blue	Other classified position
Blue	Not classified, finished (NC)
Purple	Not classified, retired (Ret)
Red	Did not qualify (DNQ)
Red	Did not pre-qualify (DNPQ)
Black	Disqualified (DSQ)
White	Did not start (DNS)
White	Race cancelled (C)
Blank	Did not practice (DNP)
Blank	Excluded (EX)
Blank	Did not arrive (DNA)
Blank	Withdrawn (WD)
Text formatting	Meaning
**Bold**	Pole position point(s)
Italics	Fastest lap point(s)

Notes:

- † – Drivers did not finish the race, but were classified as they completed more than 90% of the race distance.
