= 2018 GP3 Series =

Season of motor racing competitions

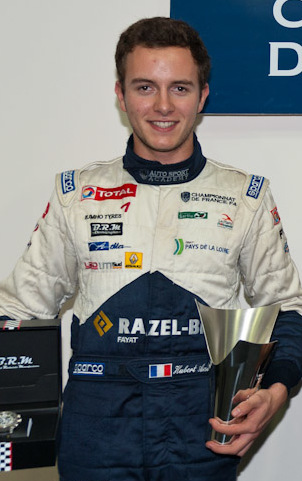
Anthoine Hubert, the series champion.

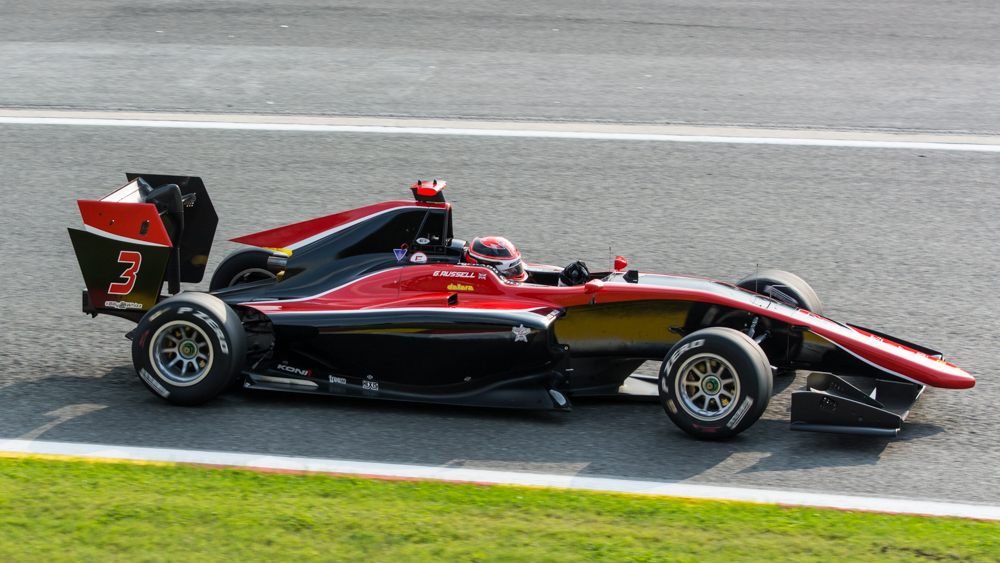
ART Grand Prix successfully defended the teams' championship.

The 2018 GP3 Series was the ninth and final season of the second-tier of Formula One feeder championship and also ninth and final season under the moniker of GP3 Series, a motor racing feeder series that runs in support of the 2018 FIA Formula One World Championship and sister series Formula 2. This was the final contested season of GP3, as the series united with the FIA Formula 3 European Championship to form the FIA Formula 3 Championship.

2018 was the final season that the Dallara GP3/16 chassis package—which débuted in the 2016 GP3 Series—was used in competition, as a brand new chassis package for the FIA Formula 3 Championship was introduced in 2019.

After finishing 3rd in the final feature race of the last season of GP3, Anthoine Hubert was crowned the 2018 GP3 Champion. ART successfully defended their teams' title over Trident after the first race at Sochi, winning the teams' title in eight of the nine seasons of GP3.

Runner-up Nikita Mazepin won 4 races; in Barcelona, Hungaroring, Spa-Francorchamps, and Yas Marina. After having four rounds with Jenzer Motorsport, David Beckmann moved to Trident before the summer break and took 3 race wins. Champion Anthoine Hubert, Callum Ilott, Leonardo Pulcini, and Pedro Piquet all won 2 races. Also, Giuliano Alesi won the second race in Spain, Jake Hughes won for the third time in the series at the Red Bull Ring, and Dorian Boccolacci, who drove for MP Motorsport before being promoted to their Formula 2 team won the sprint race at the Hungaroring.

== Teams and drivers ==
All GP3 drivers competed in a Dallara GP3/16 chassis using a Mecachrome GP3 V6 engine and Pirelli P Zero and Cinturato tyres.

Team	No.	Driver name	Rounds
(France) ART Grand Prix	1	(United Kingdom) Callum Ilott	All
(France) ART Grand Prix	2	(France) Anthoine Hubert	All
(France) ART Grand Prix	3	(Russia) Nikita Mazepin	All
(France) ART Grand Prix	4	(United Kingdom) Jake Hughes	All
(Italy) Trident	5	(Brazil) Pedro Piquet	All
(Italy) Trident	6	(France) Giuliano Alesi	All
(Italy) Trident	7	(United States) Ryan Tveter	All
(Italy) Trident	8	(Italy) Alessio Lorandi	1–4
(Italy) Trident	8	(Germany) David Beckmann	5–9
(Switzerland) Jenzer Motorsport	9	(Colombia) Tatiana Calderón	All
(Switzerland) Jenzer Motorsport	10	(United States) Juan Manuel Correa	All
(Switzerland) Jenzer Motorsport	11	(Germany) David Beckmann	1–4
(Switzerland) Jenzer Motorsport	11	(Germany) Jannes Fittje	5–9
(United Kingdom) Arden International	14	(France) Gabriel Aubry	All
(United Kingdom) Arden International	15	(France) Julien Falchero	1–7
(United Kingdom) Arden International	15	(France) Sacha Fenestraz	8–9
(United Kingdom) Arden International	16	(Australia) Joey Mawson	All
(Spain) Campos Racing	18	(Italy) Leonardo Pulcini	All
(Spain) Campos Racing	19	(Finland) Simo Laaksonen	All
(Spain) Campos Racing	20	(Mexico) Diego Menchaca	All
(Netherlands) MP Motorsport	22	(France) Dorian Boccolacci	1–5
(Netherlands) MP Motorsport	22	(Netherlands) Richard Verschoor	6–9
(Netherlands) MP Motorsport	23	(United Kingdom) Will Palmer	1
(Netherlands) MP Motorsport	23	(Denmark) Christian Lundgaard	2
(Netherlands) MP Motorsport	23	(Canada) Devlin DeFrancesco	3–9
(Netherlands) MP Motorsport	24	(Finland) Niko Kari	1–7
(Netherlands) MP Motorsport	24	(India) Jehan Daruvala	9

=== Team changes ===
- DAMS left the championship after two years of competition. Their entry was taken by Formula 2 team MP Motorsport.

=== Driver changes ===
- Gabriel Aubry and Joey Mawson, who raced in 2017 Eurocup Formula Renault 2.0 and 2017 FIA Formula 3 European Championship respectively, made their series début with Arden International. They were joined by Julien Falchero, who switched from Campos Racing. Steijn Schothorst left the team and switched to sports car racing, joining 2018 Blancpain GT Series.
- Dorian Boccolacci and Niko Kari moved from Trident and Arden International respectively to MP Motorsport. They were joined by 2017 Formula Renault Eurocup runner-up Will Palmer.
- Tatiana Calderón moved from DAMS to Jenzer Motorsport. She was joined by 2017 FIA Formula 3 European Championship driver David Beckmann. Arjun Maini left the team to join the FIA Formula 2 Championship.
- 2017 FIA Formula 3 European Championship drivers Callum Ilott and Nikita Mazepin moved to the series, joining ART Grand Prix for the season. Under the series regulations, reigning GP3 Series champion George Russell could not compete in the championship again and left the series along with Jack Aitken and Nirei Fukuzumi and joined Formula 2. Fukuzumi will also contest the 2018 Super Formula Championship.
- Simo Laaksonen continued his collaboration with Campos Racing after his campaign with the team in the 2017 Euroformula Open Championship. He was partnered by Leonardo Pulcini and Diego Menchaca, who reignited their partnership with Campos after a season with Arden in 2017 and 2017 World Series Formula V8 3.5 respectively. Raoul Hyman and Marcos Siebert both left the team. Siebert later joined Campos in the 2018 Euroformula Open Championship.
- Alessio Lorandi, who raced with Jenzer Motorsport switched to race with Trident. He was joined by former FIA Formula 3 European Championship driver Pedro Piquet.

Midseason changes

- Formula Renault Eurocup race-winner Christian Lundgaard joined MP Motorsport for a one-off entry at Paul Ricard, replacing Will Palmer. Lundgaard was replaced by FIA Formula 3 European Championship driver Devlin DeFrancesco for the rest of the season.
- Jannes Fittje replaced David Beckmann in Jenzer Motorsport after Beckmann parted ways with the team prior Hungaroring round. Beckmann filled Alessio Lorandi's slot in Trident, while Lorandi moved to Trident's FIA Formula 2 Championship team ahead of the Hungaroring round, replacing Santino Ferrucci.
- Richard Verschoor replaced Dorian Boccolacci for the Spa-Francorchamps round, as the French driver joined MP's FIA Formula 2 team, to replace Roberto Merhi. Niko Kari was also promoted to Formula 2 with MP Motorsport before the Sochi round. Jehan Daruvala took Kari's seat for the Abu Dhabi round.
- Sacha Fenestraz replaced Julien Falchero for Arden International ahead of the Sochi Autodrom round.

== Calendar ==
The following nine rounds took place as part of the 2018 championship. Each round consisted of two races, a longer race 1 and a shorter race 2:

Round	Circuit	Race 1	Race 2	Supporting
1	(Spain) Circuit de Barcelona-Catalunya, Barcelona	12 May	13 May	Spanish Grand Prix
2	(France) Circuit Paul Ricard, Le Castellet	23 June	24 June	French Grand Prix
3	(Austria) Red Bull Ring, Spielberg	30 June	1 July	Austrian Grand Prix
4	(United Kingdom) Silverstone Circuit, Silverstone	7 July	8 July	British Grand Prix
5	(Hungary) Hungaroring, Budapest	28 July	29 July	Hungarian Grand Prix
6	(Belgium) Circuit de Spa-Francorchamps, Francorchamps	25 August	26 August	Belgian Grand Prix
7	(Italy) Autodromo Nazionale Monza, Monza	1 September	2 September	Italian Grand Prix
8	(Russia) Sochi Autodrom, Sochi	29 September	30 September	Russian Grand Prix
9	(United Arab Emirates) Yas Marina Circuit, Abu Dhabi	24 November	25 November	Abu Dhabi Grand Prix

=== Calendar changes ===
- The championship will expand to nine rounds in 2018.
- The championship will return to the Sochi Autodrom, running in support of the Russian Grand Prix. The series last visited the circuit in 2015.
- The championship will make its début at the Circuit Paul Ricard, running in support of the French Grand Prix.
- The stand-alone event run at the Jerez Circuit in 2017 was discontinued.

== Results ==
=== Season summary ===
Round		Circuit	Pole position	Fastest lap	Winning driver	Winning team	Report
1	R1	(Spain) Circuit de Barcelona-Catalunya	(Italy) Leonardo Pulcini	(France) Anthoine Hubert	(Russia) Nikita Mazepin	(France) ART Grand Prix	Report
1	R2	(Spain) Circuit de Barcelona-Catalunya		(France) Giuliano Alesi	(France) Giuliano Alesi	(Italy) Trident	Report
2	R1	(France) Circuit Paul Ricard	(France) Dorian Boccolacci	(France) Anthoine Hubert	(France) Anthoine Hubert (Note: MP Motorsport driver Dorian Boccolacci won the race but was later disqualified for a technical infringement.)	(France) ART Grand Prix	Report
2	R2	(France) Circuit Paul Ricard		(France) Anthoine Hubert	(United Kingdom) Callum Ilott	(France) ART Grand Prix	Report
3	R1	(Austria) Red Bull Ring	(United Kingdom) Callum Ilott	(Italy) Leonardo Pulcini	(United Kingdom) Callum Ilott	(France) ART Grand Prix	Report
3	R2	(Austria) Red Bull Ring		(Italy) Leonardo Pulcini	(United Kingdom) Jake Hughes	(France) ART Grand Prix	Report
4	R1	(United Kingdom) Silverstone Circuit	(France) Anthoine Hubert	(United Kingdom) Callum Ilott	(France) Anthoine Hubert	(France) ART Grand Prix	Report
4	R2	(United Kingdom) Silverstone Circuit		(United Kingdom) Callum Ilott	(Brazil) Pedro Piquet	(Italy) Trident	Report
5	R1	(Hungary) Hungaroring	(France) Anthoine Hubert	(Russia) Nikita Mazepin	(Russia) Nikita Mazepin	(France) ART Grand Prix	Report
5	R2	(Hungary) Hungaroring		(Australia) Joey Mawson (Note: Joey Mawson set the fastest lap, but did not finish in the top 10, so was ineligible to be the point-scorer for the fastest lap. Dorian Boccolacci was the point-scorer instead for setting the fastest lap of those finishing in the top 10.)	(France) Dorian Boccolacci	(Netherlands) MP Motorsport	Report
6	R1	(Belgium) Circuit de Spa-Francorchamps	(Germany) David Beckmann	(France) Anthoine Hubert	(Germany) David Beckmann	(Italy) Trident	Report
6	R2	(Belgium) Circuit de Spa-Francorchamps		(Russia) Nikita Mazepin	(Russia) Nikita Mazepin	(France) ART Grand Prix	Report
7	R1	(Italy) Autodromo Nazionale Monza	(Germany) David Beckmann	(United States) Juan Manuel Correa (Note: Juan Manuel Correa set the fastest lap, but did not finish in the top 10, so was ineligible to be the point-scorer for the fastest lap. David Beckmann was the point-scorer instead for setting the fastest lap of those finishing in the top 10.)	(Germany) David Beckmann	(Italy) Trident	Report
7	R2	(Italy) Autodromo Nazionale Monza		(Russia) Nikita Mazepin	(Brazil) Pedro Piquet	(Italy) Trident	Report
8	R1	(Russia) Sochi Autodrom	(Italy) Leonardo Pulcini (Note: Nikita Mazepin originally qualified on pole for the Sochi feature race, but had his lap time deleted for track limits.)	(Russia) Nikita Mazepin	(Italy) Leonardo Pulcini	(Spain) Campos Racing	Report
8	R2	(Russia) Sochi Autodrom		(United Kingdom) Jake Hughes (Note: Jake Hughes set the fastest lap, but did not finish in the top 10, so was ineligible to be the point-scorer for the fastest lap. David Beckmann was the point-scorer instead for setting the fastest lap of those finishing in the top 10.)	(Germany) David Beckmann	(Italy) Trident	Report
9	R1	(United Arab Emirates) Yas Marina Circuit	(Russia) Nikita Mazepin	(Russia) Nikita Mazepin	(Italy) Leonardo Pulcini	(Spain) Campos Racing	Report
9	R2	(United Arab Emirates) Yas Marina Circuit		(India) Jehan Daruvala (Note: Jehan Daruvala set the fastest lap, but did not finish in the top 10, so was ineligible to be the point-scorer for the fastest lap. Ryan Tveter was the point-scorer instead for setting the fastest lap of those finishing in the top 10.)	(Russia) Nikita Mazepin	(France) ART Grand Prix	Report

== Championship standings ==
=== Scoring system ===
Points were awarded to the top 10 classified finishers in the race 1, and to the top 8 classified finishers in the race 2. The pole-sitter in the race 1 also received four points, and two points were given to the driver who set the fastest lap inside the top ten in both the race 1 and race 2. No extra points were awarded to the pole-sitter in the race 2.

Race 1 points

Position	**1st**	**2nd**	**3rd**	**4th**	**5th**	**6th**	**7th**	**8th**	**9th**	**10th**	**Pole**	**FL**
Points	25	18	15	12	10	8	6	4	2	1	4	2

Race 2 points

Points were awarded to the top 8 classified finishers.

Position	**1st**	**2nd**	**3rd**	**4th**	**5th**	**6th**	**7th**	**8th**	**FL**
Points	15	12	10	8	6	4	2	1	2

=== Drivers' championship ===
Pos.	Driver	CAT (Spain)		LEC (France)		RBR (Austria)		SIL (United Kingdom)		HUN (Hungary)		SPA (Belgium)		MNZ (Italy)		SOC (Russia)		YMC (United Arab Emirates)		Points
Pos.	Driver	R1	R2	R1	R2	R1	R2	R1	R2	R1	R2	R1	R2	R1	R2	R1	R2	R1	R2	Points
1	(France) Anthoine Hubert	2	2	1	7	17	9	**1**	4	**3**	3	3	2	2	DSQ	3	4	3	Ret	214
2	(Russia) Nikita Mazepin	1	10	2	5	13	7	2	7	1	12	5	1	5	3	2	Ret	**5**	1	198
3	(United Kingdom) Callum Ilott	3	7	8	1	**1**	6	3	5	6	2	6	3	3	DSQ	13	18	4	4	167
4	(Italy) Leonardo Pulcini	**4**	9	4	8	2	3	6	6	2	4	15	Ret	14	7	**1**	8	1	12	156
5	(Germany) David Beckmann	6	17	18	10	8	Ret	14	Ret	4	7	**1**	Ret	**1**	5	5	1	2	Ret	137
6	(Brazil) Pedro Piquet	9	Ret	6	2	4	2	7	1	12	9	4	5	7	1	15	11	12	Ret	106
7	(France) Giuliano Alesi	7	1	3	6	6	Ret	8	2	17†	16	9	6	6	2	14	17	6	10	100
8	(United Kingdom) Jake Hughes	13	3	10	17	5	1	Ret	8	16	14	7	4	9	4	7	16	7	2	85
9	(United States) Ryan Tveter	17	14	11	9	7	Ret	4	3	5	6	2	8	11	16	18	9	11	5	69
10	(France) Dorian Boccolacci	5	5	**DSQ**	14	10	5	5	9	8	1									58
11	(Italy) Alessio Lorandi	11	16	5	4	3	4	10	12											42
12	(United States) Juan Manuel Correa	8	4	9	12	19	13	Ret	15	7	5	11	10	17	Ret	9	5	8	6	42
13	(Australia) Joey Mawson	16	15	7	3	Ret	10	9	13	Ret	18	8	17†	12	12	8	2	20	9	38
14	(Finland) Simo Laaksonen	15	8	13	11	9	15	13	16	14	11	12	13	4	8	6	14	9	3	36
15	(Netherlands) Richard Verschoor											17	7	8	9	4	3	14	7	30
16	(Colombia) Tatiana Calderón	Ret	Ret	17	16	12	12	Ret	10	11	8	10	9	15	6	10	7	10	8	11
17	(Finland) Niko Kari	Ret	6	DSQ	Ret	11	8	11	Ret	Ret	Ret	14	12	10	10					6
18	(France) Gabriel Aubry	12	Ret	15	Ret	16	Ret	Ret	Ret	10	13	13	11	Ret	Ret	11	6	15	14	5
19	(Mexico) Diego Menchaca	10	12	14	Ret	14	16	12	11	9	10	19	16	Ret	14	Ret	15	18	16	3
20	(Germany) Jannes Fittje									13	17	20	15	16	11	12	10	13	Ret	0
21	(Canada) Devlin DeFrancesco					18†	11	15	14	WD	WD	18	Ret	13	15	17	12	17	11	0
22	(France) Julien Falchero	14	11	16	15	15	14	Ret	Ret	15	15	16	14	Ret	13					0
23	(Denmark) Christian Lundgaard			12	13															0
24	(France) Sacha Fenestraz															16	13	16	15	0
25	(United Kingdom) Will Palmer	18	13																	0
26	(India) Jehan Daruvala																	19	13	0
Pos.	Driver	R1	R2	R1	R2	R1	R2	R1	R2	R1	R2	R1	R2	R1	R2	R1	R2	R1	R2	Points
Pos.	Driver	CAT (Spain)		LEC (France)		RBR (Austria)		SIL (United Kingdom)		HUN (Hungary)		SPA (Belgium)		MNZ (Italy)		SOC (Russia)		YMC (United Arab Emirates)		Points

Key
Colour	Result
Gold	Winner
Silver	2nd place
Bronze	3rd place
Green	Other points position
Blue	Other classified position
Blue	Not classified, finished (NC)
Purple	Not classified, retired (Ret)
Red	Did not qualify (DNQ)
Red	Did not pre-qualify (DNPQ)
Black	Disqualified (DSQ)
White	Did not start (DNS)
White	Race cancelled (C)
Blank	Did not practice (DNP)
Blank	Excluded (EX)
Blank	Did not arrive (DNA)
Blank	Withdrawn (WD)
Text formatting	Meaning
**Bold**	Pole position point(s)
Italics	Fastest lap point(s)

Rookie

Notes:

- † — Drivers did not finish the race, but were classified as they completed over 90% of the race distance.

=== Teams' championship ===
Only three best-finishing cars are allowed to score points in the championship.

Pos.	Team	CAT (Spain)		LEC (France)		RBR (Austria)		SIL (United Kingdom)		HUN (Hungary)		SPA (Belgium)		MNZ (Italy)		SOC (Russia)		YMC (United Arab Emirates)		Points
Pos.	Team	R1	R2	R1	R2	R1	R2	R1	R2	R1	R2	R1	R2	R1	R2	R1	R2	R1	R2	Points
1	(France) ART Grand Prix	1	2	1	1	**1**	1	**1**	4	1	2	3	1	2	3	2	4	3	1	640
1	(France) ART Grand Prix	2	3	2	5	5	6	2	5	**3**	3	5	2	3	4	3	16	4	2	640
1	(France) ART Grand Prix	3	7	8	7	13	7	3	7	6	12	6	3	5	DSQ	7	18	**5**	4	640
2	(Italy) Trident	7	1	3	2	3	2	4	1	4	7	**1**	5	**1**	1	5	1	2	5	433
2	(Italy) Trident	9	14	5	4	4	4	7	2	5	8	2	6	6	2	14	9	8	10	433
2	(Italy) Trident	11	16	6	6	6	Ret	8	3	12	9	4	8	7	5	15	11	11	Ret	433
3	(Spain) Campos Racing	**4**	8	4	8	2	3	6	6	2	4	12	13	4	7	**1**	8	1	3	195
3	(Spain) Campos Racing	10	9	13	11	9	15	12	11	9	10	15	16	14	8	6	14	9	16	195
3	(Spain) Campos Racing	15	12	14	Ret	14	16	13	16	14	11	19	Ret	Ret	14	Ret	15	18	Ret	195
4	(Netherlands) MP Motorsport	5	5	12	13	10	5	5	9	8	1	14	7	8	9	4	3	14	7	94
4	(Netherlands) MP Motorsport	18	6	**DSQ**	14	11	8	11	14	Ret	Ret	17	12	10	10	17	12	17	11	94
4	(Netherlands) MP Motorsport	Ret	13	DSQ	Ret	18†	11	15	Ret	WD	WD	18	Ret	13	15			19	13	94
5	(Switzerland) Jenzer Motorsport	6	4	9	10	8	12	14	10	7	5	10	9	15	6	9	5	8	6	65
5	(Switzerland) Jenzer Motorsport	8	17	17	12	12	13	Ret	15	11	8	11	10	16	11	10	7	10	8	65
5	(Switzerland) Jenzer Motorsport	Ret	Ret	19	16	19	Ret	Ret	Ret	13	17	20	15	17	Ret	12	10	13	Ret	65
6	(United Kingdom) Arden International	12	11	7	3	15	10	9	13	10	13	8	11	12	12	8	2	15	9	43
6	(United Kingdom) Arden International	14	15	15	15	16	14	Ret	Ret	15	15	13	14	Ret	13	11	6	16	14	43
6	(United Kingdom) Arden International	16	Ret	16	Ret	Ret	Ret	Ret	Ret	Ret	18	16	17	Ret	Ret	16	13	20	15	43
Pos.	Team	R1	R2	R1	R2	R1	R2	R1	R2	R1	R2	R1	R2	R1	R2	R1	R2	R1	R2	Points
Pos.	Team	CAT (Spain)		LEC (France)		RBR (Austria)		SIL (United Kingdom)		HUN (Hungary)		SPA (Belgium)		MNZ (Italy)		SOC (Russia)		YMC (United Arab Emirates)		Points

Key
Colour	Result
Gold	Winner
Silver	2nd place
Bronze	3rd place
Green	Other points position
Blue	Other classified position
Blue	Not classified, finished (NC)
Purple	Not classified, retired (Ret)
Red	Did not qualify (DNQ)
Red	Did not pre-qualify (DNPQ)
Black	Disqualified (DSQ)
White	Did not start (DNS)
White	Race cancelled (C)
Blank	Did not practice (DNP)
Blank	Excluded (EX)
Blank	Did not arrive (DNA)
Blank	Withdrawn (WD)
Text formatting	Meaning
**Bold**	Pole position point(s)
Italics	Fastest lap point(s)

Notes:

- † — Drivers did not finish the race, but were classified as they completed over 90% of the race distance.
