= Leonardo Pulcini =

Italian racing driver (born 1998)

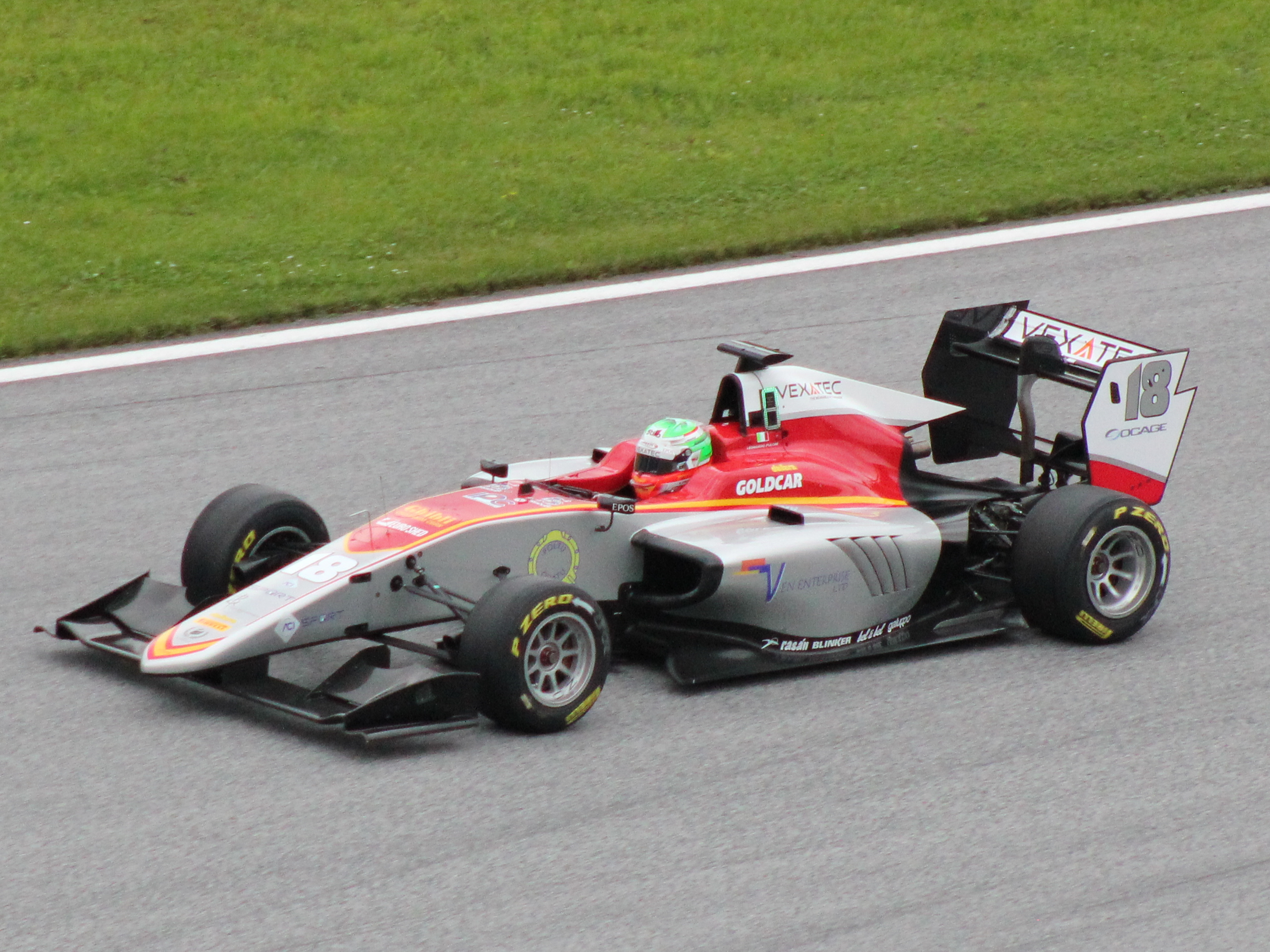
- Pulcini at the 2018 Spielberg GP3 Series round
- Nationality: (Italy) Italian
- Born: 25 June 1998 (age 28) Rome, Italy

Italian GT Championship career
- Debut season: 2014
- Current team: Barone Rampante
- Categorisation: FIA Gold
- Former teams: Hitech Grand Prix, Carlin Buzz Racing, Oregon Team, Iron Lynx
- Starts: 18 (18 entries) (FIA F3 only)
- Wins: 1 (FIA F3 only)
- Podiums: 2 (FIA F3 only)
- Poles: 0 (FIA F3 only)
- Fastest laps: 0 (FIA F3 only)
- Best finish: 8th in 2019

Previous series
- 2023–24 2019–20 2014–16 2015 2014: GT World Challenge Europe Endurance Cup; FIA Formula 3 Championship; Euroformula Open Championship; Auto GP; Italian F4 Championship

Championship titles
- 2016 2021 2022: Euroformula Open Championship; Lamborghini Super Trofeo Europe - Pro; International GT Open

Leonardo Pulcini (born 25 June 1998 in Rome) is an Italian racing driver. He won the 2016 Euroformula Open title, raced in the FIA Formula 3 Championship in 2019 and 2020, and subsequently moved into sports car racing, winning the Lamborghini Super Trofeo Europe – Pro title in 2021 and the International GT Open title in 2022 before becoming a Lamborghini factory driver in 2023.

== Career ==
=== Karting ===
Born in Rome, Pulcini began karting professionally in 2012, and came seventh in the KF3 category in the Italian ACI Karting Championship, won the ROK Cup International Final in the Junior ROK class. He rounded off the season participating in the 23rd Andrea Margutti Trophy, KF3 category, coming in 22nd.

In 2013, Pulcini came runner-up to the Italian Championship in the KF3 category, and made his WSK debut, competing in the WSK Super Master Series and the WSK Euro Series in the KF Junior, coming in ninth and sixth.

Pulcini came sixth in the CIK-FIA Karting European Championship and runner-up to the CIK-FIA World Championship. Pulcini made his KF debut in 2014, during his first year in single-seaters, coming 29th in the CIK-FIA Karting European Championship. He also made his WSK Champions Cup debut, coming in tenth, Pulcini also came 18th in the WSK Super Master Series.

=== Lower Formulae ===
In 2014, Pulcini graduated to single-seaters, competing with DAV Racing in the inaugural season of the Italian F4 Championship, where he finished fourth. He also partook in two rounds of that year's Euroformula Open Championship with the same team.

In 2015, Pulcini switched to Euroformula Open full-time with DAV Racing, scoring his maiden victory at the first race at the Red Bull Ring and finished ninth in the standings. He also partook in the first round of the 2015 Auto GP Series.

The following year, Pulcini switched to Campos Racing. With them, he took seven victories, three pole positions and eight fastest laps to secure the Euroformula Open title.

=== GP3 Series ===
In November 2016, it was announced that Pulcini would reunite with Campos for GP3 Series post-season testing at Yas Marina. In January 2017, Pulcini signed to race with Arden International. A second place in the first round at Catalunya would end up being his only points-scoring finish and the Italian ended up 14th in the championship.

For 2018, Pulcini moved to Campos Racing in what would be the final season of the GP3 Series. His results were much better, and after two race wins and three further podiums Pulcini finished fourth in the drivers' standings.

=== Sports car racing ===
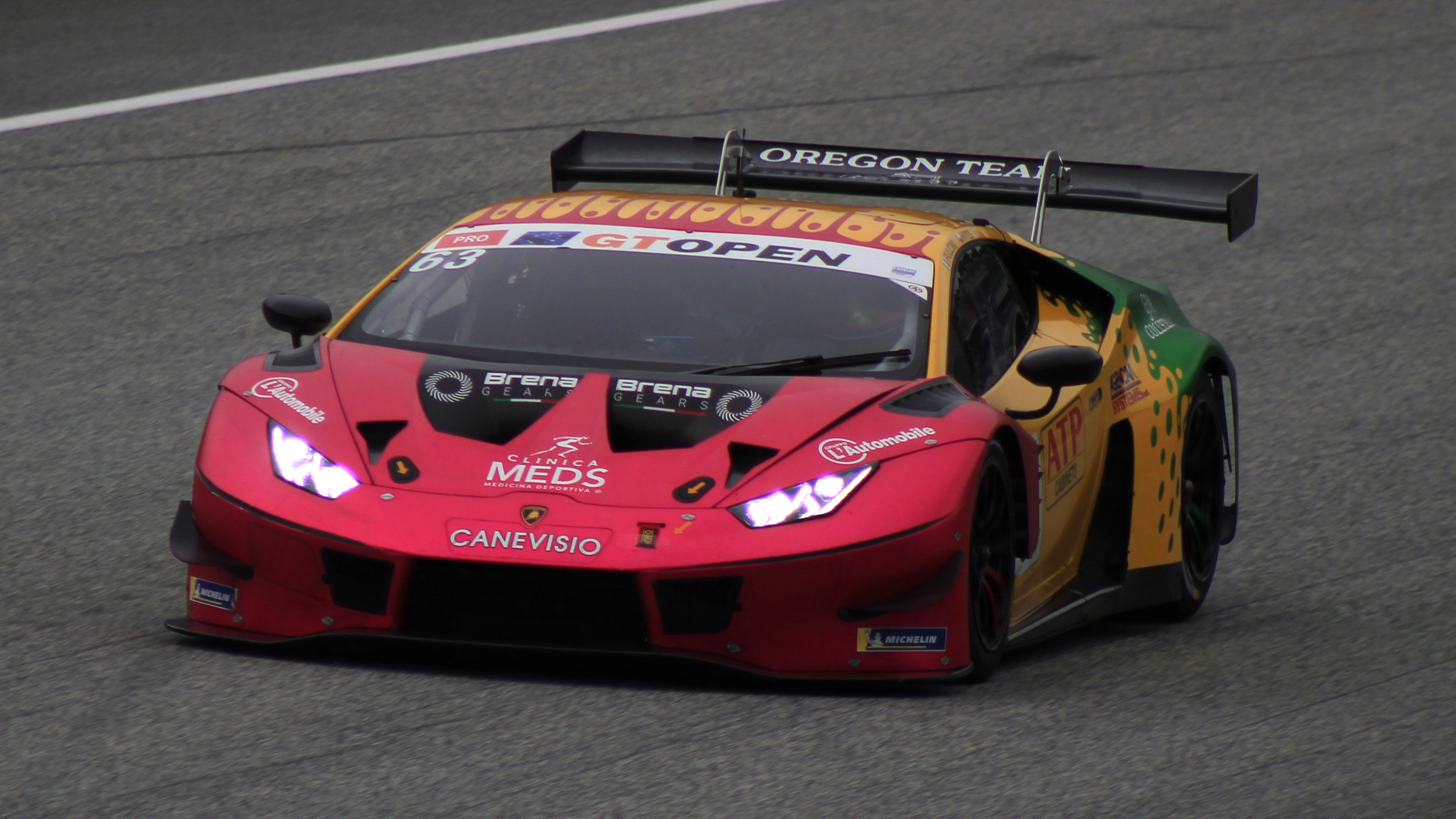
Pulcini's Lamborghini Huracán GT3 at the Red Bull Ring during the 2022 International GT Open, the season in which he and Benjamin Hites won the drivers' title

Pulcini moved into sports car racing for 2020, racing an Italian GT GT3 campaign with Vincenzo Sospiri Racing alongside a part-season return to FIA F3 with Carlin Buzz Racing. Budget problems left him without a drive for 2021, and in March that year he stepped away from racing to work in construction with his father. Days later, Oregon Team's Jerry Canevisio offered him a seat alongside Kevin Gilardoni in Lamborghini Super Trofeo Europe; Pulcini took the drive, and after a difficult start to the season won four races, including both legs of a round at Circuit Paul Ricard, to take the Pro title, clinched at Misano. He also won the Lamborghini Young Driver Program shootout that year.

The Super Trofeo title took Pulcini back into GT3 for 2022, when Oregon Team entered him in the International GT Open alongside Benjamin Hites in a Lamborghini Huracán GT3 Evo; the pairing won the drivers' title, and Oregon Team the teams' title, at the season-closing round in Barcelona. Ahead of the 2023 season, he was named a Lamborghini factory driver. His first assignment was a customer racing drive in the GT World Challenge Europe Endurance Cup with Iron Lynx. His co-drivers in the Gold Cup class were Rolf Ineichen and Michele Beretta.

Pulcini remained with Iron Lynx into 2024, competing in the GT World Challenge Europe Endurance Cup and making his IMSA SportsCar Championship debut in the Lamborghini Huracán GT3 Evo 2. He also returned to the International GT Open with Oregon Team that year, again in car number 63, sharing the Lamborghini with Rolf Ineichen. For 2025 he moved to the sprint category of the Italian GT Championship with the Barone Rampante team, sharing a Lamborghini Huracán GT3 with Giuseppe Cipriani; Fabrizio Crestani partnered Cipriani in the separate endurance rounds.

== Karting record ==
=== Karting career summary ===
Season	Series	Team	Position
2012	Italian ACI Karting Championship - KF3		7th
2012	ROK Cup International Final - Junior ROK		1st
2012	Andrea Margutti Trophy - KF3		22nd
2013	Italian ACI Karting Championship - KF3		2nd
2013	WSK Super Master Series - KF Junior		9th
2013	WSK Euro Series - KF Junior		6th
2013	CIK-FIA European Championship - KF Junior		6th
2013	CIK-FIA World Championship - KF Junior		2nd
2014	CIK-FIA European Championship - KF		29th
2014	WSK Super Master Series - KF		18th
2014	WSK Champions Cup - KF		10th

== Racing record ==
=== Racing career summary ===
Season	Series	Team name	Races	Wins	Poles	F/Laps	Podiums	Points	Position
2014	Italian F4 Championship	DAV Racing	21	0	0	0	6	187	4th
2014	Euroformula Open Championship	DAV Racing	4	0	0	0	0	14	19th
2014	Spanish Formula 3 Championship	DAV Racing	2	0	0	0	0	0	NC†
2015	Euroformula Open Championship	DAV Racing	16	1	0	0	2	91	9th
2015	Spanish Formula 3 Championship	DAV Racing	6	0	0	0	0	22	9th
2015	Auto GP Series	FMS Racing	2	0	0	0	1	27	5th‡
2016	Euroformula Open Championship	Campos Racing	16	7	3	8	13	303	**1st**
2016	Spanish Formula 3 Championship	Campos Racing	6	1	1	4	5	105	**1st**
2017	GP3 Series	Arden International	15	0	0	1	1	20	14th
2018	GP3 Series	Campos Racing	18	2	2	2	5	156	4th
2019	FIA Formula 3 Championship	Hitech Grand Prix	16	1	0	0	2	78	8th
2019	Macau Grand Prix	Campos Racing	1	0	0	0	0	N/A	DNF
2020	Italian GT Championship - GT3	Vincenzo Sospiri Racing	4	0	0	0	1	27	8th
2020	FIA Formula 3 Championship	Carlin Buzz Racing	2	0	0	0	0	0	33rd
2021	Lamborghini Super Trofeo Europe	Oregon Team	12	?	?	?	?	?	**1st**
2022	International GT Open	Oregon Team	13	4	2	1	7	128	**1st**
2023	GT World Challenge Europe Endurance Cup	Iron Lynx	5	0	0	0	0	0	NC
2023	GT World Challenge Europe Endurance Cup - Gold Cup	Iron Lynx	5	0	1	0	1	44	8th
2023	Italian GT Championship - GT3	Oregon Team	2	0	0	0	0	0	NC†
2024	International GT Open	Oregon Team	13	1	0	0	2	68	10th
2024	IMSA SportsCar Championship - GTD Pro	Iron Lynx	1	0	0	0	0	271	15th*
2024	GT World Challenge Europe Endurance Cup	Iron Lynx	1	0	0	0	0	0	NC
2025	International GT Open	Oregon Team	4	0	0	0	0	4	32nd
2025	Italian GT Championship Sprint Cup - GT3	Barone Rampante	2	0	0	0	0	6	NC†
2026	Italian GT Championship Sprint Cup - GT3	Oregon Team	2	0	0	0	0	0	NC†

^{‡} Position when season was cancelled.
^{†} As Pulcini was a guest driver, he was ineligible for points.

=== Complete Italian F4 Championship results ===
(key) (Races in bold indicate pole position) (Races in italics indicate fastest lap)

Year	Team	1	2	3	4	5	6	7	8	9	10	11	12	13	14	15	16	17	18	19	20	21	DC	Points
2014	DAV Racing	ADR; 1; 8	ADR; 2; 4	ADR; 3; 2	IMO1; 1; 3	IMO1; 2; 5	IMO1; 3; 5	MUG; 1; 3	MUG; 2; 10	MUG; 3; 14	MAG; 1; 3	MAG; 2; 7	MAG; 3; 3	VLL; 1; 6	VLL; 2; 5	VLL; 3; 5	MNZ; 1 Ret	MNZ; 2 Ret	MNZ; 3; 9	IMO2; 1; 4	IMO2; 2; 17	IMO2; 3; 3	4th	187

=== Complete Euroformula Open Championship results ===
Year	Team	1	2	3	4	5	6	7	8	9	10	11	12	13	14	15	16	Rank	Points
2014	DAV Racing	NÜR	NÜR	ALG	ALG	JER	JER	HUN	HUN	SIL	SIL	SPA; DNS	SPA; DNS	MNZ	MNZ	CAT; 7	CAT; 8	19th	14
2015	DAV Racing	JER; 1 Ret	JER; 2 Ret	LEC; 1; 18	LEC; 2; 11	EST; 1; 9	EST; 2; 5	SIL; 1 Ret	SIL; 2; 4	RBR; 1; 1	RBR; 2; 5	SPA; 1; 3	SPA; 2 Ret	MNZ; 1; 10	MNZ; 2; 7	CAT; 1; 6	CAT; 2 DNS	9th	91
2016	Campos Racing	**EST**; **1**; 1	EST; 2; 2	**SPA**; **1**; 2	SPA; 2; 1	LEC; 1; 2	LEC; 2; 1	**SIL**; **1**; 1	SIL; 2; 17	RBR; 1; 4	RBR; 2; 2	MNZ; 1; 1	MNZ; 2; 1	JER; 1; 2	JER; 2; 1	CAT; 1; 16	CAT; 2; 3	1st	303

=== Complete Auto GP Series results ===
(key) (Races in bold indicate pole position) (Races in italics indicate fastest lap)

Year	Team	1	2	3	4	Pos	Points
2015	FMS Racing	HUN; 1; 4	HUN; 2; 2	SIL; 1	SIL; 2	5th	27

=== Complete GP3 Series/FIA Formula 3 Championship results ===
(key) (Races in bold indicate pole position) (Races in italics indicate fastest lap)

Year	Entrant	1	2	3	4	5	6	7	8	9	10	11	12	13	14	15	16	17	18	Pos	Points
2017	Arden International	CAT; FEA; 2	CAT; SPR; 17	RBR; FEA; Ret	RBR; SPR; 14	SIL; FEA; 11	SIL; SPR; 12	HUN; FEA; 15	HUN; SPR; 10	SPA; FEA; 11	SPA; SPR; 11	MNZ; FEA; Ret	MNZ; SPR; C	JER; FEA; 14	JER; SPR; 13	YMC; FEA; 17†	YMC; SPR; Ret			14th	20
2018	Campos Racing	**CAT**; **FEA**; 4	CAT; SPR; 9	LEC; FEA; 4	LEC; SPR; 8	RBR; FEA; 2	RBR; SPR; 3	SIL; FEA; 6	SIL; SPR; 6	HUN; FEA; 2	HUN; SPR; 4	SPA; FEA; 15	SPA; SPR; Ret	MNZ; FEA; 14	MNZ; SPR; 7	**SOC**; **FEA**; 1	SOC; SPR; 8	YMC; FEA; 1	YMC; SPR; 12	4th	156
2019	Hitech Grand Prix	CAT; FEA; 20	CAT; SPR; 21	LEC; FEA; Ret	LEC; SPR; 12	RBR; FEA; 9	RBR; SPR; 5	SIL; FEA; 4	SIL; SPR; 1	HUN; FEA; 7	HUN; SPR; 2	SPA; FEA; 7	SPA; SPR; 7	MNZ; FEA; 10	MNZ; SPR; 6	SOC; FEA; 4	SOC; SPR; 16			8th	78
2020	Carlin Buzz Racing	RBR; FEA	RBR; SPR	RBR; FEA	RBR; SPR	HUN; FEA	HUN; SPR	SIL; FEA	SIL; SPR	SIL; FEA	SIL; SPR	CAT; FEA; 16	CAT; SPR; 24	SPA; FEA	SPA; SPR	MNZ; FEA	MNZ; SPR	MUG; FEA	MUG; SPR	33rd	0

=== Complete Macau Grand Prix results ===
Year	Team	Car	Qualifying	Quali Race	Main race
2019	(Spain) Campos Racing	Dallara F3 2019	25th	10th	DNF

=== Complete International GT Open results ===
(key) (Races in bold indicate pole position; results in italics indicate fastest lap)

Year	Entrant	Class	Chassis	1	2	3	4	5	6	7	8	9	10	11	12	13	14	Rank	Points
2022	Oregon Team	Pro	Lamborghini Huracán GT3 Evo	EST; 1; 1	EST; 2; 1	LEC; 1; 8	LEC; 2; 6	**SPA**; 1	**HUN**; **1**; 8	HUN; 2; 13	RBR; 1; 2	RBR; 2; 1	MNZ; 1; 8	MNZ; 2; 2	CAT; 1; 2	CAT; 2; 5		1st	128
2024	Oregon Team	Pro	Lamborghini Huracán GT3 Evo 2	ALG; 1; 9	ALG; 2; 6	HOC; 1; 5	HOC; 2; 7	SPA; WD	HUN; 1; 4	HUN; 2; 1	LEC; 1; 9	LEC; 2; 6	RBR; 1; 3	RBR; 2; 4	CAT; 1; 8	CAT; 2 Ret	MNZ; 24	10th	68
2025	Oregon Team	Pro	Lamborghini Huracán GT3 Evo 2	ALG; 1	ALG; 2	SPA; 1	HOC; 1	HOC; 2	HUN; 1; 7	HUN; 2; 12	LEC; 1; 14	LEC; 2 Ret	RBR; 1	RBR; 2	CAT; 1	CAT; 2	MNZ	32nd	4

=== GT World Challenge Europe Endurance Cup ===
(key) (Races in bold indicate pole position; results in italics indicate fastest lap)

Year	Team	Car	Class	1	2	3	4	5	6	7	Pos.	Points
2023	Iron Lynx	Lamborghini Huracán GT3 Evo 2	Gold	MNZ; Ret	LEC; 34	SPA; 6H; 30	SPA; 12H; 48	SPA; 24H; Ret	NÜR; 12	**CAT**; Ret	8th	44
2024	Iron Lynx	Lamborghini Huracán GT3 Evo 2	Pro	LEC	SPA; 6H	SPA; 12H	SPA; 24H	NÜR	MNZ; 18	JED	NC	0

=== Complete IMSA SportsCar Championship results ===
(key) (Races in bold indicate pole position; races in italics indicate fastest lap)

Year	Entrant	Class	Make	Engine	1	2	3	4	5	6	7	8	9	10	Rank	Points
2024	Iron Lynx	GTD Pro	Lamborghini Huracán GT3 Evo 2	Lamborghini DGF 5.2 L V10	DAY	SEB; 6	LGA	DET	WGL	MOS	ELK	VIR	IMS	PET	35th	271

^{*} Season still in progress.

Sporting positions
Preceded by Vitor Baptista	Euroformula Open Championship; Champion; 2016	Succeeded by Harrison Scott
Preceded by Konstantin Tereshchenko	Spanish Formula 3 Championship; Champion; 2016	Succeeded by Devlin DeFrancesco
