= Robert Shwartzman =

Israeli and Russian racing driver (born 1999)

- רוברט שוורצמן; Ро́берт Шва́рцман
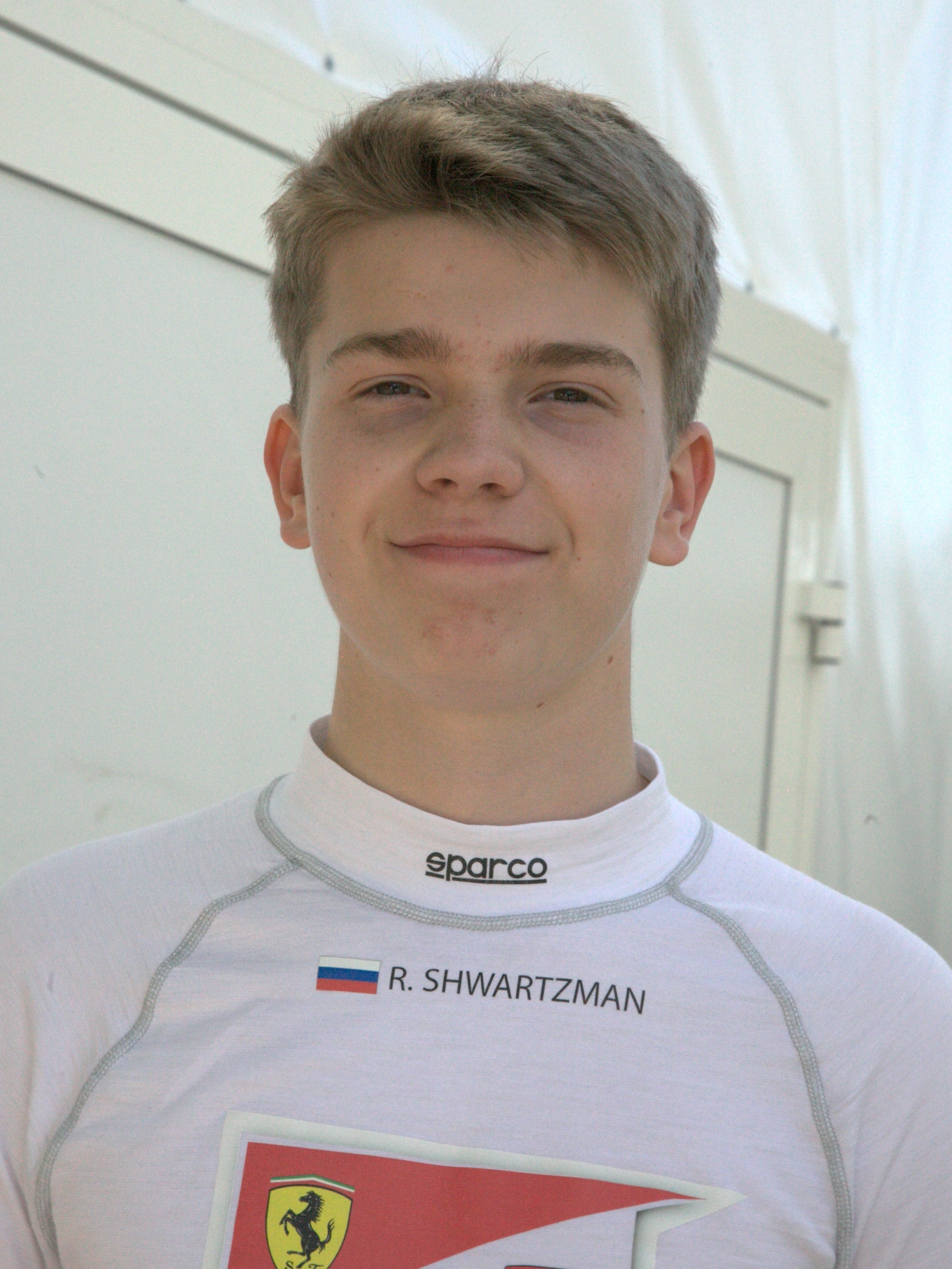
- Shwartzman in 2018
- Born: Robert Mikhailovich Shwartzman; 16 September 1999 (age 27); Tel Aviv, Israel
- Nationality: (Israel) Israeli; (Russia) Russian (Note: Shwartzman competed with a Russian license until 2022. Following the Russian invasion of Ukraine, the FIA banned competitors racing under the Russian flag; Shwartzman switched to an Israeli license instead of competing under a neutral flag.)

IndyCar Series career
- 17 races run over 1 year
- Best finish: 24th (2025)
- First race: 2025 Firestone Grand Prix of St. Petersburg (St. Petersburg)
- Last race: 2025 Borchetta Bourbon Music City Grand Prix (Nashville)
Wins	Podiums	Poles
0	0	1

FIA World Endurance Championship career
- Categorisation: FIA Platinum
- Years active: 2024
- Teams: AF Corse
- Starts: 8
- Championships: 0
- Wins: 1
- Podiums: 1
- Poles: 0
- Fastest laps: 0
- Best finish: 9th in 2024 (LMH)

Previous series
- 2024; 2023; 2020–2021; 2019; 2018; 2018; 2016–2017; 2016–2017; 2015; 2014–2015: FIA WEC; GTWC Europe; FIA Formula 2; FIA Formula 3; FIA F3 European; Toyota Racing Series; Formula Renault Eurocup; Formula Renault NEC; ADAC F4; Italian F4

Championship titles
- 2019; 2018: FIA Formula 3; Toyota Racing Series

Awards
- 2025: Indianapolis 500 Rookie of the Year

Robert Mikhailovich Shwartzman (Hebrew: רוברט מיכאילוביץ' שוורצמן; Russian: Ро́берт Миха́йлович Шва́рцман, pronounced [ˈrobʲɪrt mʲɪˈxajləvʲɪtɕ ˈʂvartsmən]; born 16 September 1999) is an Israeli and Russian racing driver who is due to compete in Formula E for Lola and in the FIA World Endurance Championship for Peugeot.

In formula racing, Shwartzman was a Ferrari junior between 2017 and 2022, and a reserve driver for Ferrari in Formula One between 2021 and 2024. He won the Toyota Racing Series in 2018 and FIA Formula 3 in 2019, before placing fourth and second in Formula 2 for Prema Racing. He joined Prema on its IndyCar Series debut, and scored a shock pole position at the 2025 Indianapolis 500. Shwartzman is set to make his Formula E debut with Lola at the end of 2026.

In endurance racing, Shwartzman has been a factory driver for Ferrari in 2023 and 2024, and for Peugeot since 2027. At Ferrari, he raced in GT World Challenge Europe and the FIA World Endurance Championship, where he won the 2024 Lone Star Le Mans for AF Corse in Hypercar. He will return to WEC in 2027 with Peugeot.

== Early and personal life ==
Shwartzman was born on 16 September 1999 in Tel Aviv, Israel. He was raised in Saint Petersburg and Italy. His father, Mikhail Shwartzman, was from Russia, and died of COVID in 2020. He is of Jewish heritage.

In 2023, Shwartzman released a rap song titled "ACTIVE".

== Junior racing career ==
=== Karting ===
Shwartzman began karting in 2004 at the age of four. Throughout a seven-year career of karting professionally, he claimed karting titles across Europe (predominantly in Italy).

=== Formula 4 ===
==== Italian F4 ====
In 2014, Shwartzman graduated to single-seaters, partaking in six races of the Italian F4 Championship with Cram Motorsport. He finished in the points four times out of the six, to rank sixteenth overall with 26 points.

The following year, Shwartzman partook in the championship full-time with Mücke Motorsport. Shwartzman claimed his first single-seater podium at just the first race at Vallelunga. He later took his maiden wins at Adria. Overall, Shwartzman claimed three wins and finished third in the standings with 212 points behind the Prema Powerteam duo of Ralf Aron and Guanyu Zhou.

==== ADAC F4 ====
During that year, Shwartzman also partook in the inaugural ADAC Formula 4 championship. He had a run of six consecutive podiums but did not record a win. He was unable to finish the season, but finished fourth in the standings.

=== Formula Renault ===
==== 2016 ====
In 2016, Shwartzman moved to Formula Renault 2.0 with reigning series champions Josef Kaufmann Racing after testing with the team at Motorland Aragon. He claimed two victories in the Northern European Cup and finished sixth in the standings. In the Eurocup, Shwartzman finished eighth.

==== 2017 ====
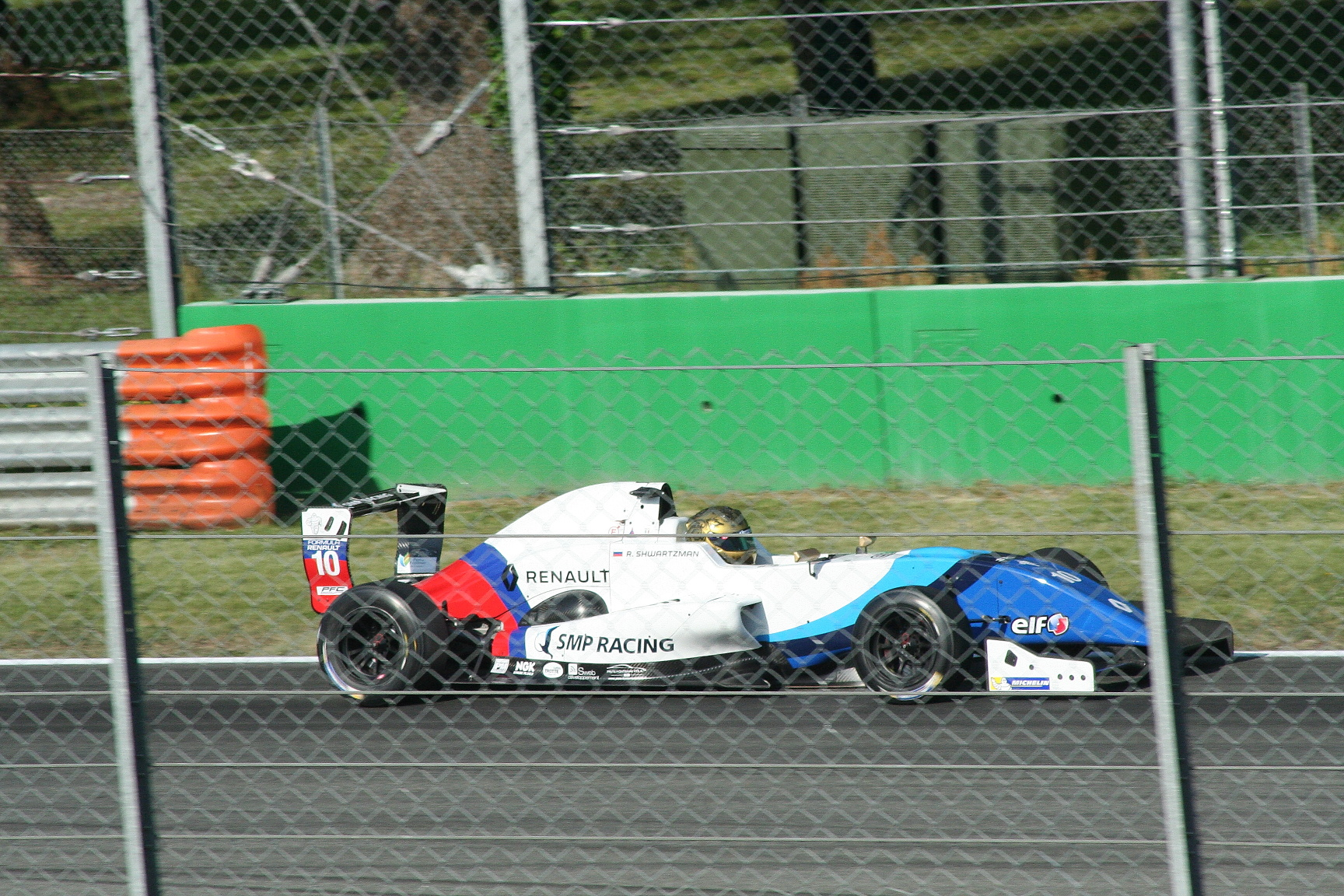
Shwartzman racing in the 2017 Formula Renault Eurocup

For 2017, Shwartzman stayed in Formula Renault 2.0, but decided to switch to the R-ace GP team. He lost thirteen points to his teammate Will Palmer and finished in the third place in the driver standings, but was able to win six races, having podium finish at all rounds excepting Red Bull Ring, and at Circuit Paul Ricard.

=== Toyota Racing Series ===
Shwartzman made his Toyota Racing Series debut during the 2018 off-season, competing for M2 Competition. He finished all fifteen races in the top-five and was the only driver in the season to do so. He won the Denny Hulme Memorial Trophy and the series title, ahead of the M2 teammates Richard Verschoor and Marcus Armstrong, who have raced in the series in 2017.

=== Formula Three ===
==== GP3 Series ====
In November 2016, Shwartzman was listed among the drivers partaking in the post-season test at Yas Marina with Koiranen GP.

==== FIA Formula 3 European Championship ====
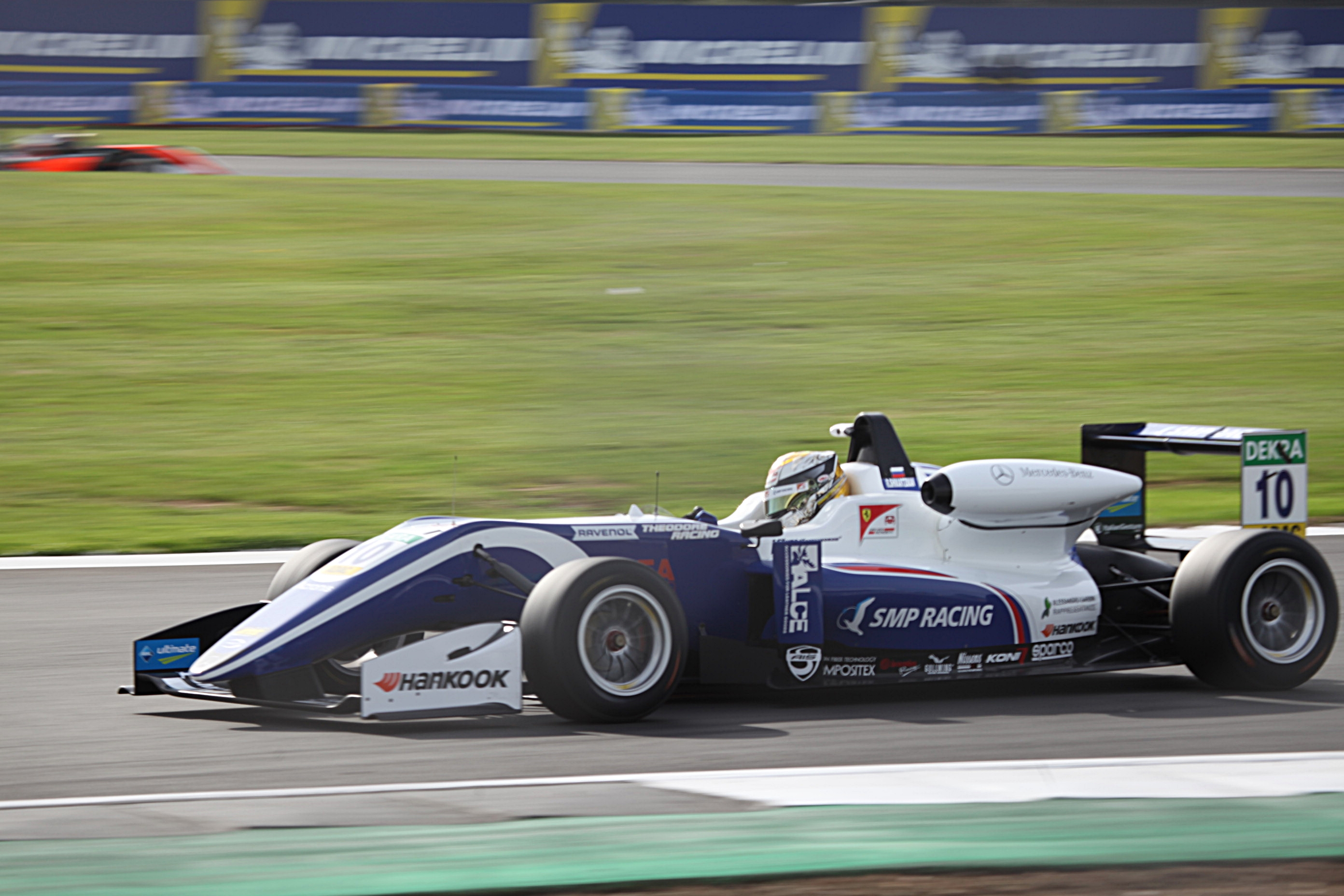
Shwartzman racing for Prema Powerteam in the 2018 FIA Formula 3 European Championship

In September 2017, Shwartzman tested the European Formula 3 machinery with Prema Powerteam. After his tests with Prema he was included into the Ferrari Driver Academy. In December 2017, it was confirmed that he will race for Prema in 2018 FIA Formula 3 European Championship. Shwartzman took his first European Formula 3 win in the third Spielberg race. With his second win in the season finale he outscored another Ferrari Driver Academy member Marcus Armstrong in the drivers' standings, completing the top-three with claiming the rookie title.

==== FIA Formula 3 Championship ====
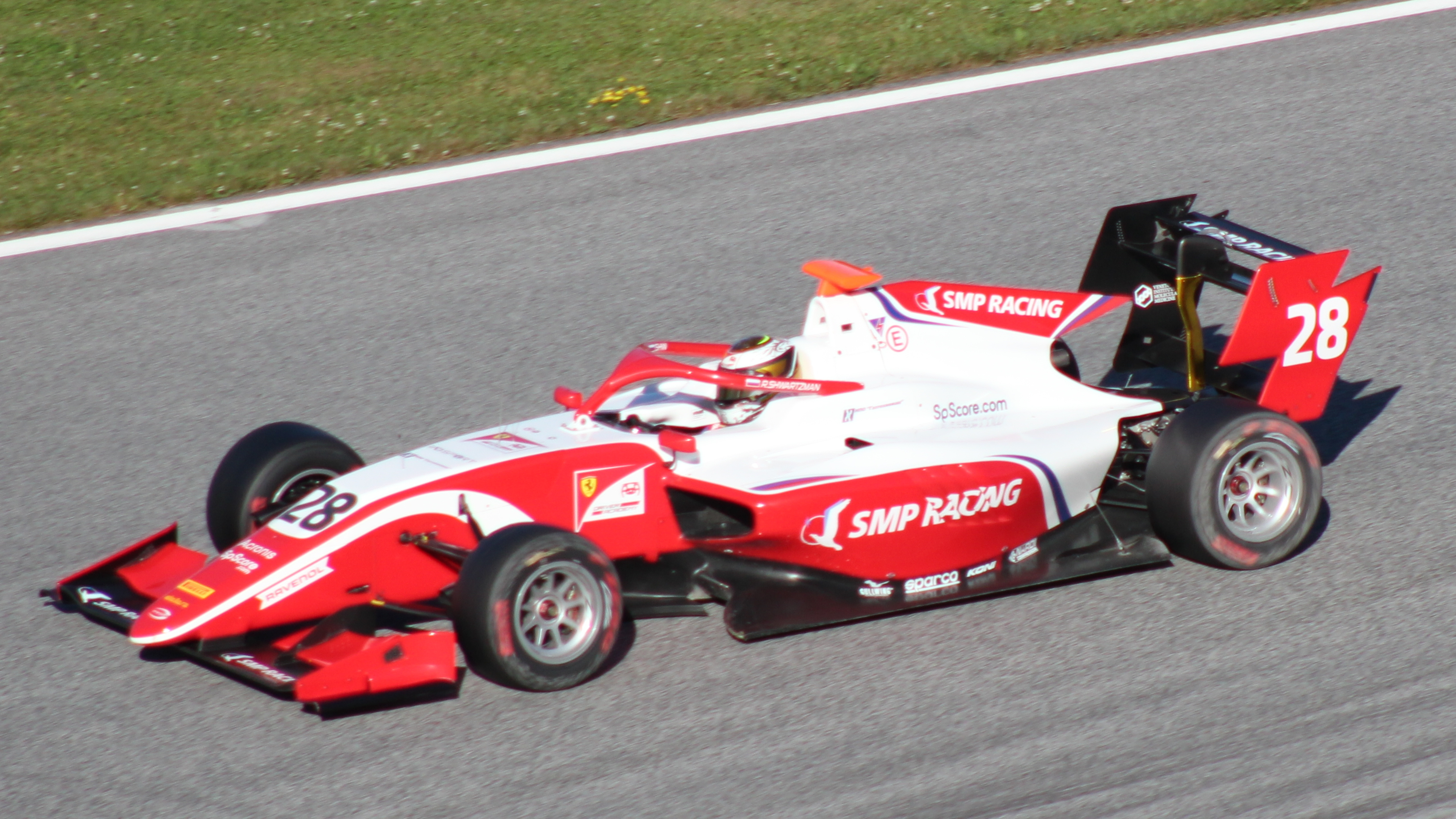
Shwartzman driving the Dallara F3 2019 during the 2019 Spielberg Formula 3 round

Following the merger of the FIA Formula 3 European Championship and GP3 Series into the new FIA Formula 3 Championship in 2019, Prema announced Shwartzman as one of its drivers for the inaugural season. Shwartzman qualified on pole for the first Barcelona race and initially finished the race in second before being promoted to race winner following a time penalty to Christian Lundgaard. In the following day's race, he finished fourth.

Shwartzman took third place at qualifying in Circuit Paul Ricard and finished second in the first race, losing only to his team-mate Jehan Daruvala. After starting from seventh in the grid, at the sprint race, he took his second victory. At the Red Bull Ring, Shwartzman qualified only twelfth, after suffering from technical issues. He went up to fifth in the first race, and in the next race he battled with Marcus Armstrong, but at the final lap made contact. Armstrong retired and Shwartzman crossed the finish line in first, but was given a five-second time penalty for causing a collision, dropping him down to third behind race winner HWA Racelab driver Jake Hughes, who took victory here last year, and Jehan Daruvala.

At Silverstone, Shwartzman qualified sixth. It looked like he would finish in the same position, but with three laps remaining, he overtook Christian Lundgaard. Later, Pedro Piquet also overtook him. On Sunday, he finished second with the fastest lap, behind Hitech Grand Prix and race winner Leonardo Pulcini who took two victories in the 2018 GP3 Series – at Sochi and Abu Dhabi – all victories for the Italian were at the feature races. At the Hungaroring, it was the first weekend for Shwartzman to not score any podiums - he qualified fourth, but following a poor start, finished only in fifth. The following day, he was set to take third position, however retired following difficulties in tyre management and a collision with Felipe Drugovich. At Spa-Francorchamps Shwartzman qualified in fourth position, and overtook Jehan Daruvala and Marcus Armstrong to finish in second place. In the following sprint race, he finished third behind Yuki Tsunoda, and Marcus Armstrong.

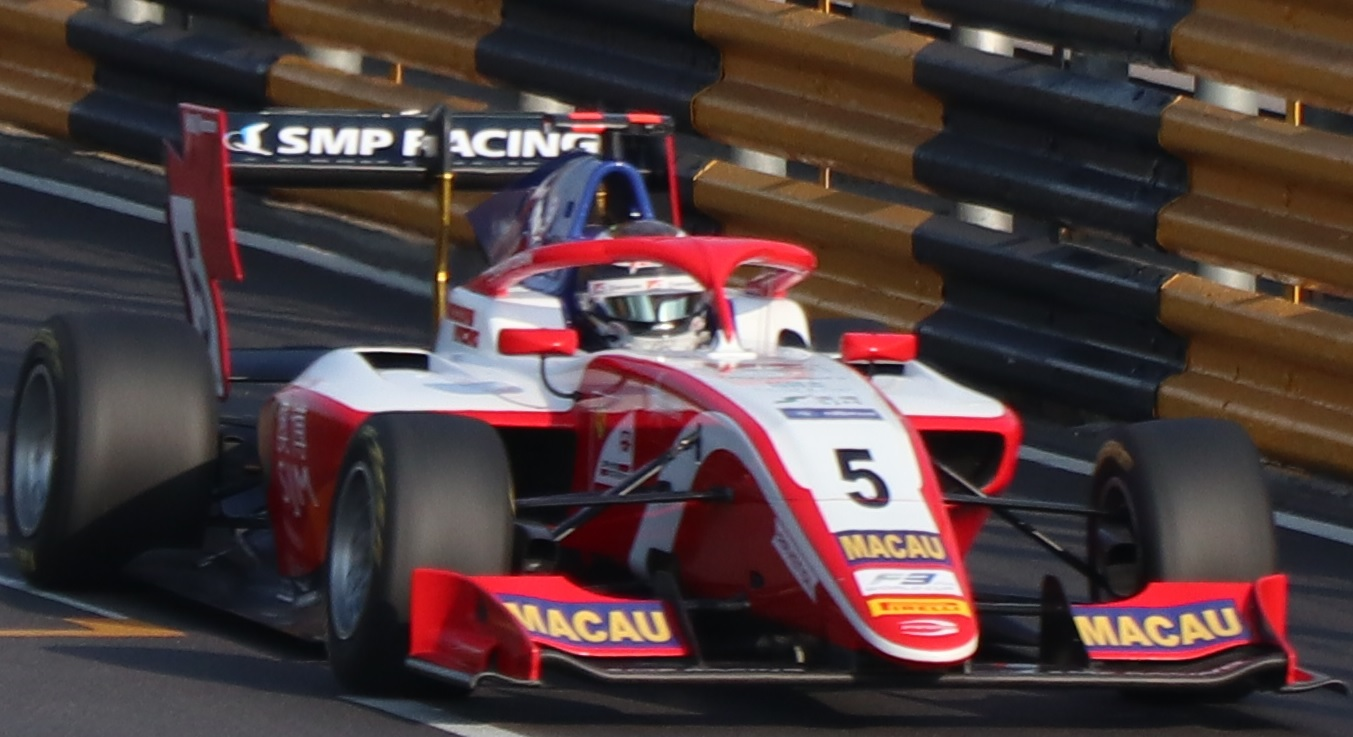
Robert Shwartzman at 2019 Macau Grand Prix.

At Monza, Shwartzman qualified third, and despite a five-place grid penalty, was able to win his third race of the year. In the sprint, he took eight place by a margin of 0.067 seconds over Christian Lundgaard and to take the final point. Shwartzman took the pole position ahead of his home race at Sochi, but he couldn't save his race lead and finished second behind Armstrong. However, Shwartzman's point advantage on Daruvala was enough for him to clinch the championship title.

=== FIA Formula 2 Championship ===
==== 2020 ====
Shwartzman joined Prema Racing for the 2020 FIA Formula 2 Championship, partnering Mick Schumacher. The season was planned to begin in March, but was postponed until July due to COVID-19 pandemic. On 18 April 2020, Shwartzman's father died of COVID-19 aged 52. On his rookie season of F2, Shwartzman expected his season as "toughest season of my life" mainly due to his father's death. Shwartzman qualified eighth on the opening race at the Red Bull Ring in Austria. He made a good start, moving up to fifth and later taking advantage for a mechanical issue for Guanyu Zhou and a mistake from Schumacher. This led him to take a podium finish on his Formula 2 debut, taking third place in the feature race. Shwartzman finished in fourth, two places higher than where he started due to retirements from Giuliano Alesi and former Formula 3 teammate Marcus Armstrong. Shwartzman took his first Formula 2 victory at the feature race of the second Red Bull Ring round, having started eighth. He took the lead from Zhou with nine laps to go. Over the cool-down lap, Shwartzman dedicated the victory to his late father. After the race, Shwartzman described that the red flag "saved" him at the start of the race. However, in the sprint race, his fortunes were reversed by spinning out on the first lap on his own and retiring.

The next feature race at the Hungaroring saw Shwartzman qualify in eleventh position. He left the first turn of the first lap five places ahead in sixth. He had a tire strategy different from the front-runners and had better tyre management. He was in a different world after his pit stop, overtaking Luca Ghiotto and Callum Ilott at the end of lap 29, and taking the lead from Schumacher just a lap later. Eventually, he won the race with a fifteen-second gap. In doing so, Shwartzman took the championship lead. In the sprint race, Shwartzman finished in fourth, passing a few drivers in the race. In Silverstone, Shwartzman qualified a lowly eighteenth. He struggled for pace in both the feature and sprint races, finishing fourteenth and thirteenth respectively. The second Silverstone weekend would prove to be a little better, with Shwartzman qualifying in eleventh. He ended the feature race in eighth, passing Dan Ticktum for the reverse-grid position with five laps to go. Shwartzman led the race for the majority of the sprint race, until with thiree laps to go, Schumacher tried to pass him, but smashed into his front-right tyre, damaging Shwartzman's front wing. They were overtaken by Yuki Tsunoda who went on to win the race. Shwartzman was soon swarmed by the field, and in the end finished thirteenth. His result saw him lose the championship lead. Shwartzman back in top form again in Barcelona, qualifying second and taking the lead from Ilott into the first corner. On lap eight, however, the British driver would reclaim it back. Shwartzman survived a dramatic late safety car restart to finish in second place, only losing out to a timely pitstop from Nobuharu Matsushita. During the sprint race, Shwartzman was hit with massive tyre degradation and only managed thirteenth.

Shwartzman topped free practice for the first time and qualified fourth at Spa-Francorchamps. He fell to seventh on the opening lap but made it up to finish fifth. During the sprint race, Shwartzman passed a slow starting Guanyu Zhou. He grabbed his opportunity after Ticktum and Roy Nissany collided. From then on, he would control the race and eventually win by nine seconds. Shwartzman improved to ninth after starting 16th at Monza, but was just less than a second away from Louis Delétraz from taking reverse pole. He managed to progress to sixth place in the sprint race, before being promoted a place after Ticktum was disqualified. Shwartzman qualified ninth for the round at Mugello. He would retire with a car issue at the halfway mark of the feature race. Shwartzman stormed back to ninth in the sprint race despite a mistake on lap eighteen but was not enough to nab points.

At his home event at Sochi Autodrom, Shwartzman qualified seventh. However, a slow pit stop costed Shwartzman and soon slipping down to 11th. Shwartzman only finished tenth in a red-flagged sprint race, capping off another point-less weekend. Following the weekend, Shwartzman sat fifth in the standings, a distant 51 points off championship leader Schumacher. Shwartzman qualified fourteenth in the first of two rounds in Bahrain. He pushed his way up into fifth place, but fell to eighth after drivers on fresher and softer tyres overtook him. However, he did manage to get reverse pole. He converted it to a dominant win, leading every lap. Shwartzman qualified fourth at the second Sakhir round. He improved ahead to second on the first lap, passing both Carlin drivers. He eventually was passed by Tsunoda, and later in the race by Guanyu Zhou and Felipe Drugovich. He finished in fifth, but when Nikita Mazepin was penalised, he was moved to fourth position. Shwartzman placed 5th in the sprint race. Overall, Shwartzman ranked fourth in the standings with 177 points, but ultimately was beaten by teammate Schumacher who became champion. During the season, he collected six podiums, a fastest lap and four wins — the most wins of any driver during the season.

==== 2021 ====
Shwartzman continued with Prema for the 2021 FIA Formula 2 Championship, this time partnering the reigning FIA Formula 3 champion, Oscar Piastri. Shwartzman endured a shaky start on the first round at Bahrain, qualifying twelfth. He improved to fourth on the opening race in Bahrain. He retired in the second race, after making contact with Dan Ticktum. He finished seventh in the feature race. In Monaco, Shwartzman topped practice and qualified second. Shwartzman brushed the barrier on the first lap during the first sprint race, damaging his front wing and later retired. From last, Shwartzman rose to tenth courtesy of retirements to finish tenth. Shwartzman was on course to take second in the feature race before a slow pit stop caused him to lose positions to Piastri and Felipe Drugovich, ending the race in fourth.

Shwartzman qualified tenth in Baku, and started from reverse pole in the first race. He then scored his first win of the season, winning by five seconds. He finished fifth in the second sprint race, and ended the weekend in third place, taking advantage of multiple incidents and penalties for other drivers. In Silverstone, Shwartzman qualified seventh. He won once again, having a brilliant start to pass Christian Lundgaard, Jüri Vips and Roy Nissany before the first corner. He described his win as "redemption" following his win being taken away the previous year due to a collision. In the second sprint race, Shwartzman was running just outside the points when he spun on the penultimate corner on the penultimate lap, dropping him to fifteenth at the flag. He bounced back to secure fifth in the feature race.

Shwartzman qualified twelfth in Monza. During the first sprint race, Shwartzman benefitted from incidents and failures from other drivers saw him run in third place. However, Shwartzman was awarded a 5-second time penalty for leaving the track and gaining an advantage at the start of the race. He was demoted to sixth, and promoted Lundgaard who started nineteenth to finish on the podium. He managed to claim third in the second sprint, after overtaking Liam Lawson, Vips, and David Beckmann. Shwartzman rounded off his weekend with a sixth place finish in the feature race. In Sochi, Shwartzman qualified seventh. Shwartzman got his home podium in mixed conditions by finishing third, after a battle with Jake Hughes and an incident for Lawson. Following a cancelled sprint 2 due to bad weather, he raced to fourth place in the feature race, finishing just two seconds shy of third place Jehan Daruvala.

Shwartzman qualified second from following up with fastest in free practice, forming a Prema front row lockout in Jeddah. Shwartzman finished fifth in sprint 1, following a battle with Lundgaard. Shwartzman would finish fifth on the road, but following penalties for Lundgaard and Daruvala, he was promoted to third place. In the red-flagged feature race, Shwartzman finished second behind Piastri. His performance in Jeddah moved him ahead of Guanyu Zhou into second place in the championship. At the season finale in Abu Dhabi, Shwartzman qualified fourth and finished in the same place that he qualified in the first sprint race. However, as Piastri finished third, he claimed the title with two races to go, meaning that Shwartzman's title challenge was over. Shwartzman finished second in the second sprint, making up two places at the start. He then overtook Ticktum and Ralph Boschung whilst benefitting from a retirement by Marcus Armstrong. Shwartzman ended the feature race in fifth place, after being passed by Théo Pourchaire and Drugovich in the dying stages of the race. He finished the 2021 season as vice-champion with two wins, three fastest laps and eight podiums in total. He also achieved a total of 192 points that year, albeit 60.5 points off champion Piastri. Following his successful two F2 campaigns, Shwartzman left the series.

== Formula One career ==
Shwartzman was due to appear in the first practice session of the 2020 Abu Dhabi Grand Prix, driving for Haas. However, he did not appear on the entry list. He took part in the 2021 post-season young driver test with Haas and Ferrari.

Shwartzman was a test driver for Ferrari. He currently competes under the Israeli flag after the FIA banned drivers from competing under the Russian flag following the 2022 Russian invasion of Ukraine. Shwartzman participated in two Free Practice 1 sessions for Ferrari in the 2022 season, one ahead of the United States Grand Prix, the other ahead of the Abu Dhabi Grand Prix. He also participated in a test with the Ferrari SF21 in September, at the Fiorano circuit together with Antonio Giovinazzi, in order to prepare them both for the free practice sessions in which they were to compete. At his first free practice outing, Shwartzman finished the session sixteenth, highest of the rookies but well down on his teammate who set the fastest time. He described his experience as "awesome and hard". In his second free practice, in Abu Dhabi, he was classified seventh. Shwartzman also participated in the 2022 post-season tests with Ferrari.

In 2023, Shwartzman was released from the Ferrari Driver Academy, but was promoted to serve as the Ferrari reserve for 2023. He took part in his first free practice session of 2023 at the Dutch Grand Prix for Ferrari. He took part in his second free practice session at Abu Dhabi, finishing eighth overall. Shwartzman also drove the SF-23 during the post-season tests with Ferrari, completing 123 laps.

Shwartzman continued as one of the reserve drivers for Ferrari in 2024. He partook in his first free practice of the year at the Dutch Grand Prix for Kick Sauber, placing sixteenth in the session. Later that year, Shwartzman participated during the first free practice session at the Mexico City Grand Prix with Kick Sauber, and finished nineteenth. During the session, he obtained a five-position grid penalty, which can only be served if he competes in a race, for overtaking under double yellow flags. A month later, after signing with Prema Racing in IndyCar, Shwartzman announced that he had left Ferrari.

== Sportscar racing career ==
=== 2023: GT World Challenge ===
Shwartzman returned to competition in 2023, pairing up with Nicklas Nielsen and Alessio Rovera at AF Corse in the GT World Challenge Europe Endurance Cup, thus making his debut in sportscar racing as a new Ferrari factory driver.

At the end of the year, Shwartzman drove the Ferrari 499P Hypercar in Bahrain during the WEC rookie test. He placed fastest overall.

=== 2024: WEC debut ===
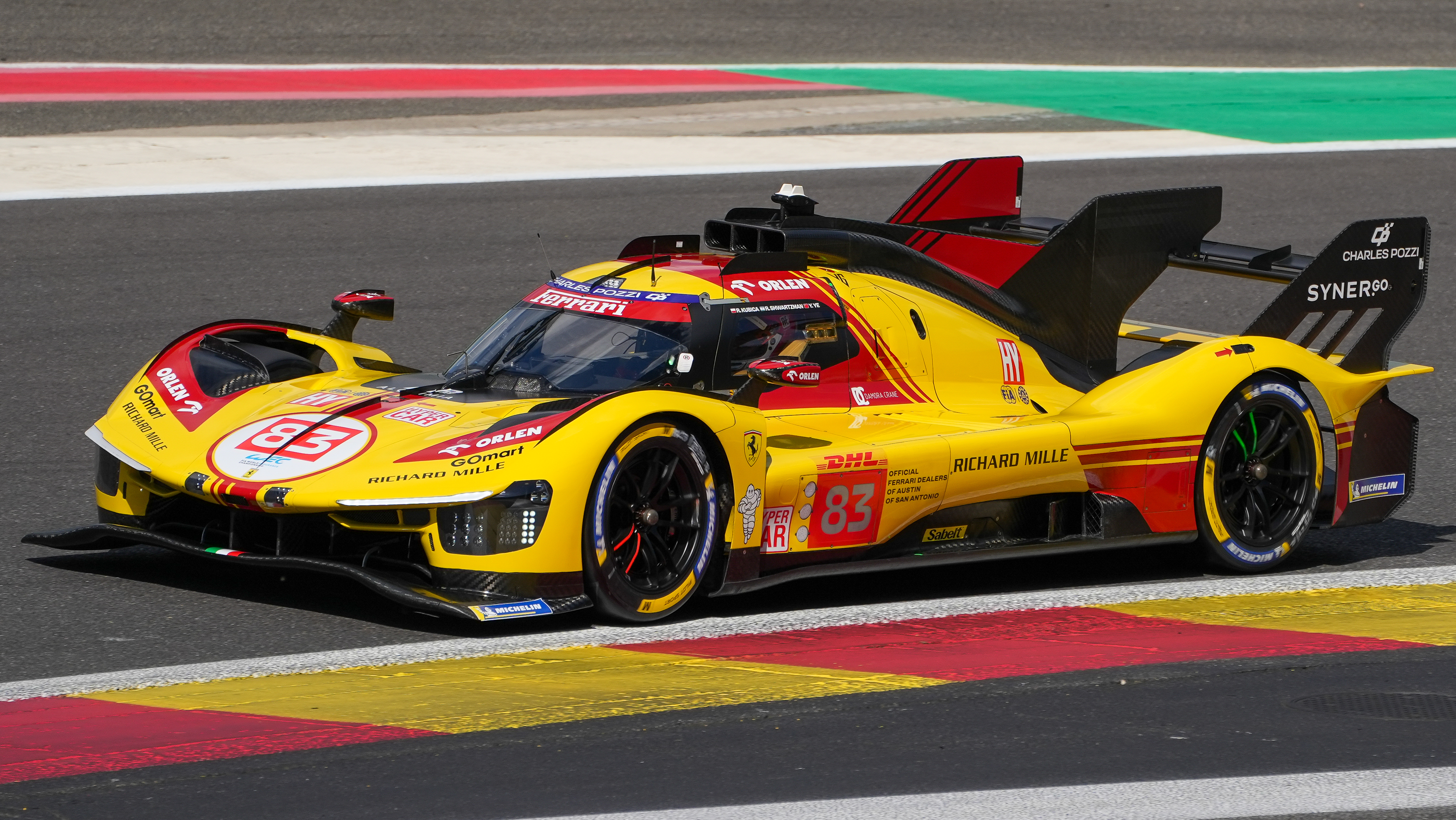
The No. 83 499P piloted by Shwartzman, Kubica, and Ye during the 2024 6 Hours of Spa-Francorchamps

Shwartzman would compete in the 2024 FIA World Endurance Championship for AF Corse alongside Yifei Ye and Robert Kubica. Shwartzman started the season in good fashion, as the No. 83 finished the Qatar 1812 km in fourth place on its debut. At a chaotic 24 Hours of Le Mans, the No. 83 would find themselves in the lead at the six-hour mark, but was penalised after Robert Kubica took out Dries Vanthoor, and the former would receive a thirty-second penalty. More bad luck befell the No. 83 car as they would retire with a mechanical issue after 248 laps. Nevertheless, they bounced back with a victory in the Lone Star Le Mans. An eighth place in the 8 Hours of Bahrain put the No. 83 AF Corse ninth in the Hypercar standings, with 57 points.

=== 2027: Return with Peugeot ===
In 2027, Shwartzman will return to the FIA World Endurance Championship with Peugeot.

== IndyCar career ==
At the start of January 2023, Shwartzman took part in an IndyCar test with Chip Ganassi Racing.

=== Prema (2025) ===
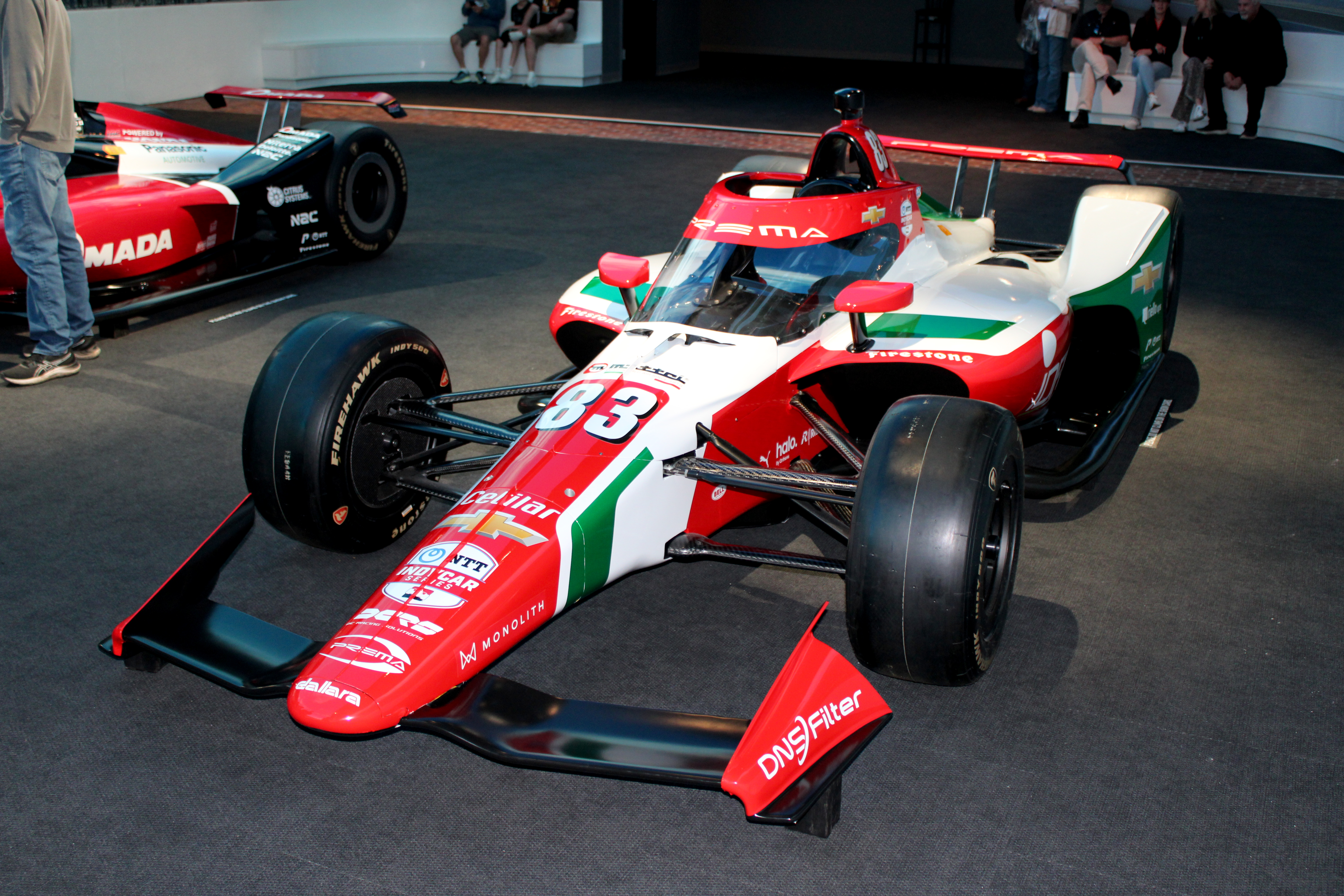
Robert Shwartzman's 2025 Prema Racing Dallara IR-18 on display at the Indianapolis Motor Speedway Museum

On 5 November 2024, it was announced that Shwartzman would compete full-time in the series for Prema Racing in 2025, alongside former Formula 2 rival Callum Ilott. Prema struggled to adapt to the series at the start of the season, as he and Ilott finished no higher than 18th in the first five rounds. However, Shwartzman shocked the field and qualified on pole position for the 2025 Indianapolis 500, becoming the first rookie driver to do so since Teo Fabi in 1983. This was also Prema's first pole in IndyCar. He did not finish the race after crashing in the pit lane on lap 87. Despite this, Shwartzman was named Indianapolis 500 Rookie of the Year for 2025. Two races later, Shwartzman picked up his and Prema's first top-ten finish in Illinois. Prema would prove to be more competitive in the second half of the season, with Shwartzman picking up top-20 finishes in all but two races; this included his best finish yet with ninth in Iowa. Shwartzman finished his rookie season of IndyCar 24th in the standings, missing out on the Rookie of the Year to Louis Foster by two points, and he also finished just seven points behind teammate Ilott. His season also received praise from IndyCar president Doug Boles, who labelled Shwartzman's pole as "a great story for all of us".

Shwartzman was under contract to compete with Prema in 2026. However, Prema's uncertainty to continue racing in the series has left his future in the series in doubt. He did not secure a seat with any of the other teams to compete in the 2026 Indianapolis 500, making him the first pole-sitter to not race in the following year's race since Bruno Junqueira back in 2003.

== Formula E career ==
In April 2023, he tested for DS Penske in Formula E in the Berlin rookie test. He then took part in the pre-season testing in Circuit Ricardo Tormo for the 2023–24 championship with the team. DS Penske again selected Shwartzman to partake in the 2024 Berlin rookie test with them, where he ended fastest overall.

=== Lola (2027–) ===
A few days before the start of pre-season test, Lola Formula E Team announced the signing of Shwartzman for the 2026–27 season.

== Karting record ==
=== Karting career summary ===
Season	Series	Team	Position
2007	Euro Trophy — 60 Baby		7th
2007	Italian Cup — 60 Baby	Michael Schwartzman	18th
2008	Easykart International Grand Final — Easy 60		1st
2009	Trofeo delle Industrie — Minikart	Birel Motorsport	1st
2009	Easykart International Grand Final — Easy 60	Masini	1st
2010	Trofeo delle Industrie — 60 Mini		4th
2010	WSK Nations Cup — 60 Mini		2nd
2010	Andrea Margutti Trophy — 60 Mini	Birel Motorsport Srl	3rd
2010	Easykart International Grand Final — 100 Easykart	Masini	DNF
2010	Italian Open Masters — 60 Mini		12th
2011	Andrea Margutti Trophy — 60 Mini		3rd
2011	Campionato Italiano CSAI Karting — 60 Mini		4th
2011	WSK Final Cup — 60 Mini		14th
2012	Andrea Margutti Trophy — KF3		27th
2012	WSK Euro Series — KF3		41st
2012	WSK Master Series — KF3	Forza Racing	36th
2012	CIK-FIA European Championship — KF3		25th
2012	Trofeo delle Industrie — KF3	Forza Racing	10th
2012	WSK Final Cup — KF3		16th
2013	South Garda Winter Cup — KF3		9th
2013	Italian Championship — KF3		5th
2013	WSK Super Master Series — KFJ		8th
2013	CIK-FIA International Super Cup — KFJ		22nd
2013	WSK Euro Series — KFJ		9th
2013	CIK-FIA European Championship — KFJ	Forza Racing	4th
2013	CIK-FIA World Championship — KFJ	Forza Racing	3rd
2013	WSK Final Cup — KFJ	Forza Racing	1st

== Racing record ==
=== Racing career summary ===
Season	Series	Team	Races	Wins	Poles	F/Laps	Podiums	Points	Position
2014	Italian F4 Championship	Cram Motorsport	6	0	0	0	0	26	16th
2015	Italian F4 Championship	Mücke Motorsport	21	2	4	3	8	212	**3rd**
2015	ADAC Formula 4 Championship	ADAC Berlin-Brandenburg e.V.	20	0	0	4	8	167	4th
2016	Eurocup Formula Renault 2.0	Josef Kaufmann Racing	15	0	0	0	1	75	8th
2016	Formula Renault 2.0 NEC	Josef Kaufmann Racing	15	2	1	2	3	206	6th
2017	Formula Renault Eurocup	R-ace GP	23	6	7	7	12	285	**3rd**
2017	Formula Renault NEC	R-ace GP	3	0	0	0	1	0	NC†
2018	FIA Formula 3 European Championship	Prema Theodore Racing	30	2	3	1	11	294	**3rd**
2018	Macau Grand Prix	SJM Theodore Racing by Prema	1	0	0	0	0	N/A	9th
2018	Toyota Racing Series	M2 Competition	15	1	3	3	9	916	**1st**
2019	FIA Formula 3 Championship	Prema Racing	16	3	2	2	10	212	**1st**
2019	Macau Grand Prix	SJM Prema Theodore Racing	1	0	0	0	0	N/A	DNF
2020	FIA Formula 2 Championship	Prema Racing	24	4	0	1	6	177	4th
2021	FIA Formula 2 Championship	Prema Racing	23	2	0	3	8	192	**2nd**
2022	Formula One	Scuderia Ferrari	Test driver						
2022–23	Formula E	DS Penske	Test driver						
2023	GT World Challenge Europe Endurance Cup	AF Corse	7	1	1	0	1	36	8th
2023	Formula One	Scuderia Ferrari	Reserve driver						
2023–24	Formula E	DS Penske	Test driver						
2024	FIA World Endurance Championship - Hypercar	AF Corse	8	1	0	0	1	57	9th
2024	Formula One	Scuderia Ferrari	Reserve driver						
2024	Formula One	Stake F1 Team Kick Sauber	Test driver						
2025	IndyCar Series	Prema Racing	17	0	1	0	0	211	24th
2026–27	Formula E	Lola Formula E Team	0	0	0	0	0	0	TBD

^{†} As Shwartzman was a guest driver, he was ineligible for points.

=== Complete Italian F4 Championship results ===
(key) (Races in bold indicate pole position) (Races in italics indicate fastest lap)

Year	Team	1	2	3	4	5	6	7	8	9	10	11	12	13	14	15	16	17	18	19	20	21	DC	Points
2014	Cram Motorsport	ADR; 1	ADR; 2	ADR; 3	IMO1; 1	IMO1; 2	IMO1; 3	MUG; 1	MUG; 2	MUG; 3	MAG; 1	MAG; 2	MAG; 3	VLL; 1	VLL; 2	VLL; 3	MNZ; 1 Ret	MNZ; 2; 5	MNZ; 3; 7	IMO2; 1; 8	IMO2; 2; 11	IMO2; 3; 8	16th	26
2015	Mücke Motorsport	VLL; 1; 3	VLL; 2; 5	VLL; 3; 22	**MNZ**; **1**; 2	MNZ; 2 Ret	MNZ; 3; 4	IMO1; 1; 3	IMO1; 2; 4	IMO1; 3; 7	MUG; 1; 15	MUG; 2; 12	MUG; 3; 13	ADR; 1; 4	ADR; 2; 1	**ADR**; **3**; 1	IMO2; 1; 2	IMO2; 2; 6	IMO2; 3; 2	**MIS**; **1**; 4	MIS; 2; 1	**MIS**; **3**; 4	3rd	212

=== Complete ADAC Formula 4 Championship results ===
(key) (Races in bold indicate pole position) (Races in italics indicate fastest lap)

Year	Team	1	2	3	4	5	6	7	8	9	10	11	12	13	14	15	16	17	18	19	20	21	22	23	24	DC	Points
2015	ADAC Berlin-Brandenburg e.V.	OSC1; 1 Ret	OSC1; 2; 10	OSC1; 3; 12	RBR; 1; 6	RBR; 2; 32	RBR; 3; 30	SPA; 1; 3	SPA; 2; 3	SPA; 3; 3	LAU; 1; 2	LAU; 2; 3	LAU; 3; 3	NÜR; 1; 6	NÜR; 2; 3	NÜR; 3; 5	SAC; 1; 27	SAC; 2; 7	SAC; 3; 10	OSC2; 1; 3	OSC2; 2 Ret	OSC2; 3; 5	HOC; 1	HOC; 2	HOC; 3	4th	167

=== Complete Formula Renault Eurocup results ===
(key) (Races in bold indicate pole position) (Races in italics indicate fastest lap)

Year	Team	1	2	3	4	5	6	7	8	9	10	11	12	13	14	15	16	17	18	19	20	21	22	23	Pos	Points
2016	Josef Kaufmann Racing	ALC; 1; 5	ALC; 2; 8	ALC; 3; 9	MON; 1; 12	MNZ; 1; 5	MNZ; 2; 6	MNZ; 3; 6	RBR; 1; 11	RBR; 2 Ret	LEC; 1; 7	LEC; 2; 11	SPA; 1 Ret	SPA; 2; 14	EST; 1; 3	EST; 2; 6									8th	75
2017	R-ace GP	**MNZ**; **1**; 1	MNZ; 2 Ret	SIL; 1; 3	**SIL**; **2**; 1	**PAU**; **1**; 1	PAU; 2; 3	MON; 1; 4	MON; 2; 2	HUN; 1; 7	HUN; 2; 5	HUN; 3; 2	**NÜR**; **1**; 1	NÜR; 2; 8	RBR; 1; 6	RBR; 2; 9	LEC; 1; 23	**LEC**; **2** DSQ	SPA; 1; 2	SPA; 2; 25	SPA; 3 Ret	**CAT**; **1**; 1	**CAT**; **2**; 1	CAT; 3; 2	3rd	285

=== Complete Formula Renault Northern European Cup results ===
(key) (Races in bold indicate pole position) (Races in italics indicate fastest lap)

Year	Team	1	2	3	4	5	6	7	8	9	10	11	12	13	14	15	DC	Points
2016	Josef Kaufmann Racing	MNZ; 1; 5	MNZ; 2; 22	SIL; 1; 11	SIL; 2 Ret	HUN; 1; 5	HUN; 2; 2	SPA; 1; 6	SPA; 2; 8	ASS; 1; 7	ASS; 2; 7	NÜR; 1; 1	NÜR; 2 Ret	HOC; 1; 5	**HOC**; **2**; 1	HOC; 3; 13	6th	206
2017	R-ace GP	MNZ; 1	MNZ; 2	ASS; 1	ASS; 2	NÜR; 1	NÜR; 2	SPA; 1; 2	SPA; 2; 25	SPA; 3 Ret	HOC; 1	HOC; 2					NC†	0

^{†} As Shwartzman was a guest driver, he was ineligible to score points.

=== Complete Toyota Racing Series results ===
(key) (Races in bold indicate pole position) (Races in italics indicate fastest lap)

Year	Team	1	2	3	4	5	6	7	8	9	10	11	12	13	14	15	DC	Points
2018	M2 Competition	**RUA**; **1**; 2	RUA; 2; 3	**RUA**; **3**; 2	TER; 1; 2	TER; 2; 4	TER; 3; 4	HMP; 1; 4	HMP; 2; 2	HMP; 3; 3	TAU; 1; 4	TAU; 2; 5	**TAU**; **3**; 1	MAN; 1; 2	MAN; 2; 4	MAN; 3; 2	1st	916

=== Complete FIA Formula 3 European Championship results ===
(key) (Races in bold indicate pole position) (Races in italics indicate fastest lap)

Year	Entrant	Engine	1	2	3	4	5	6	7	8	9	10	11	12	13	14	15	16	17	18	19	20	21	22	23	24	25	26	27	28	29	30	DC	Points
2018	Prema Theodore Racing	Mercedes	PAU; 1; 8	PAU; 2; 9	PAU; 3; 6‡	HUN; 1; 3	HUN; 2; 5	HUN; 3 Ret	NOR; 1; 6	**NOR**; **2** Ret	NOR; 3; 7	ZAN; 1; 8	ZAN; 2; 7	ZAN; 3; 11	SPA; 1; 5	SPA; 2; 4	SPA; 3; 2	SIL; 1; 8	SIL; 2; 9	SIL; 3; 10	MIS; 1; 3	MIS; 2; 9	MIS; 3; 7	**NÜR**; **1**; 2	NÜR; 2; 2	NÜR; 3; 2	RBR; 1; 2	RBR; 2; 3	RBR; 3; 1	HOC; 1; 2	HOC; 2; 5	**HOC**; **3**; 1	3rd	294

^{‡} Half points awarded as less than 75% of race distance was completed.

=== Complete Macau Grand Prix results ===
Year	Team	Car	Qualifying	Quali Race	Main race
2018	(Italy) SJM Theodore Racing by Prema	Dallara F317	12th	10th	9th
2019	(Italy) SJM Theodore Racing by Prema	Dallara F3 2019	**2nd**	**2nd**	DNF

=== Complete FIA Formula 3 Championship results ===
(key) (Races in bold indicate pole position; races in italics indicate points for the fastest lap of top ten finishers)

Year	Entrant	1	2	3	4	5	6	7	8	9	10	11	12	13	14	15	16	DC	Points
2019	Prema Racing	**CAT**; **FEA**; 1	CAT; SPR; 4	LEC; FEA; 2	LEC; SPR; 1	RBR; FEA; 5	RBR; SPR; 3	SIL; FEA; 5	SIL; SPR; 2	HUN; FEA; 5	HUN; SPR; Ret	SPA; FEA; 2	SPA; SPR; 3	MNZ; FEA; 1	MNZ; SPR; 8	**SOC**; **FEA**; 2	SOC; SPR; 3	1st	212

=== Complete FIA Formula 2 Championship results ===
(key) (Races in bold indicate pole position) (Races in italics indicate points for the fastest lap of top ten finishers)

Year	Entrant	1	2	3	4	5	6	7	8	9	10	11	12	13	14	15	16	17	18	19	20	21	22	23	24	DC	Points
2020	Prema Racing	RBR1; FEA; 3	RBR1; SPR; 4	RBR2; FEA; 1	RBR2; SPR; Ret	HUN; FEA; 1	HUN; SPR; 4	SIL1; FEA; 14	SIL1; SPR; 13	SIL2; FEA; 8	SIL2; SPR; 13	CAT; FEA; 2	CAT; SPR; 13	SPA; FEA; 5	SPA; SPR; 1	MNZ; FEA; 9	MNZ; SPR; 5	MUG; FEA; Ret	MUG; SPR; 9	SOC; FEA; 11	SOC; SPR; 10	BHR1; FEA; 8	BHR1; SPR; 1	BHR2; FEA; 4	BHR2; SPR; 5	4th	177
2021	Prema Racing	BHR; SP1; 4	BHR; SP2; Ret	BHR; FEA; 7	MCO; SP1; Ret	MCO; SP2; 10	MCO; FEA; 4	BAK; SP1; 1	BAK; SP2; 5	BAK; FEA; 3	SIL; SP1; 1	SIL; SP2; 15	SIL; FEA; 5	MNZ; SP1; 6	MNZ; SP2; 3	MNZ; FEA; 6	SOC; SP1; 3	SOC; SP2; C	SOC; FEA; 4	JED; SP1; 5	JED; SP2; 3	JED; FEA; 2‡	YMC; SP1; 4	YMC; SP2; 2	YMC; FEA; 5	2nd	192

^{‡} Half points awarded as less than 75% of race distance was completed.

=== Complete Formula One participations ===
(key) (Races in bold indicate pole position) (Races in italics indicate fastest lap)

Year	Entrant	Chassis	Engine	1	2	3	4	5	6	7	8	9	10	11	12	13	14	15	16	17	18	19	20	21	22	23	24	WDC	Points
2022	Scuderia Ferrari	Ferrari F1-75	Ferrari 066/7 1.6 V6 t	BHR	SAU	AUS	EMI	MIA	ESP	MON	AZE	CAN	GBR	AUT	FRA	HUN	BEL	NED	ITA	SIN	JPN	USA; TD	MXC	SAP	ABU; TD			–	–
2023	Scuderia Ferrari	Ferrari SF-23	Ferrari 066/10 1.6 V6 t	BHR	SAU	AUS	AZE	MIA	MON	ESP	CAN	AUT	GBR	HUN	BEL	NED; TD	ITA	SIN	JPN	QAT	USA	MXC	SAP	LVG	ABU; TD			–	–
2024	Stake F1 Team Kick Sauber	Kick Sauber C44	Ferrari 066/12 1.6 V6 t	BHR	SAU	AUS	JPN	CHN	MIA	EMI	MON	CAN	ESP	AUT	GBR	HUN	BEL	NED; TD	ITA	AZE	SIN	USA	MXC; TD	SAP	LVG	QAT	ABU	–	–

=== Complete GT World Challenge results ===
==== GT World Challenge Europe Endurance Cup ====
(Races in bold indicate pole position) (Races in italics indicate fastest lap)

Year	Team	Car	Class	1	2	3	4	5	6	7	Pos.	Points
2023	AF Corse - Francorchamps Motors	Ferrari 296 GT3	Pro	MNZ; 8	LEC; 7	SPA; 6H; 29	SPA; 12H; 25	SPA; 24H; 44†	NÜR; 22	**CAT**; 1	8th	36

=== Complete FIA World Endurance Championship results ===
(key) (Races in bold indicate pole position; races in italics indicate fastest lap)

Year	Entrant	Class	Chassis	Engine	1	2	3	4	5	6	7	8	Rank	Points
2024	AF Corse	Hypercar	Ferrari 499P	Ferrari 3.0 L Turbo V6	QAT; 4	IMO; 8	SPA; 8	LMS; Ret	SÃO; 11	COA; 1	FUJ; 12	BHR; 8	9th	57

=== Complete 24 Hours of Le Mans results ===
Year	Team	Co-Drivers	Car	Class	Laps	Pos.	Class Pos.
2024	(Italy) AF Corse	(Poland) Robert Kubica (China) Yifei Ye	Ferrari 499P	Hypercar	248	DNF	DNF

=== American open-wheel racing results ===
==== IndyCar Series ====
(key)

Year	Team	No.	Chassis	Engine	1	2	3	4	5	6	7	8	9	10	11	12	13	14	15	16	17	Rank	Points	Ref
2025	Prema Racing	83	Dallara DW12	Chevrolet	STP; 20	THE; 22	LBH; 18	ALA; 25	IMS; 18	**INDY**; 26	DET; 16	GTW; 10	ROA; 27	MDO; 21	IOW; 20	IOW; 9	TOR; 16	LAG; 21	POR; 15	MIL; 18	NSH; 14	24th	211	

==== Indianapolis 500 ====
Year	Chassis	Engine	Start	Finish	Team
2025	Dallara	Chevrolet	**1**	26	Prema Racing

== Notes ==
Sporting positions
Preceded by Thomas Randle	Toyota Racing Series; Champion; 2018	Succeeded by Liam Lawson
Preceded by Lando Norris	FIA Formula 3 European Championship; Rookie Champion; 2018	Succeeded by None (Series ended)
Preceded by Anthoine Hubert (GP3 Series)	FIA Formula 3 Championship; Champion; 2019	Succeeded by Oscar Piastri
Preceded by Kyle Larson	Indianapolis 500; Rookie of the Year; 2025	Succeeded by Mick Schumacher
