= 2020 2nd Spielberg Formula 2 round =

(Austria) 2020 2nd Red Bull Ring Formula 2 round
Round details
- Round 2 of 12 in the 2020 FIA Formula 2 Championship.
- Layout of the Red Bull Ring
- Location: Red Bull Ring; Spielberg, Styria, Austria
- Course: Permanent racing circuit 4.318 km (2.683 mi)

Feature race
- Date: 11 July 2020
- Laps: 36 (Scheduled distance: 40 laps)
Pole position
Driver	(Japan) Yuki Tsunoda	Carlin
Time	1:14.803	
Podium
First	(Russia) Robert Shwartzman	Prema Racing
Second	(Japan) Yuki Tsunoda	Carlin
Third	(China) Guanyu Zhou	UNI-Virtuosi
Fastest lap
Driver	(Israel) Roy Nissany	Trident
- Time: 1:27.030 (on lap 30)

Sprint race
- Date: 12 July 2020
- Laps: 28
Podium
First	(Denmark) Christian Lundgaard	ART Grand Prix
Second	(United Kingdom) Dan Ticktum	DAMS
Third	(New Zealand) Marcus Armstrong	ART Grand Prix
Fastest lap
Driver	(Israel) Roy Nissany	Trident
- Time: 1:16.419 (on lap 25)

The 2020 2nd Red Bull Ring FIA Formula 2 round was a pair of motor races for Formula 2 cars that took place on 11 and 12 July 2020 at the Red Bull Ring in Spielberg, in Austria as part of the FIA Formula 2 Championship. It was the second round of the 2020 FIA Formula 2 Championship and ran in support of the 2020 Styrian Grand Prix.

== Classification ==
=== Qualifying ===
Pos.	No.	Driver	Team	Time	Gap	Grid
1	7	(Japan) Yuki Tsunoda	Carlin	1:14.803		1
2	3	(China) Guanyu Zhou	UNI-Virtuosi	1:14.841	+0.038s	2
3	4	(United Kingdom) Callum Ilott	UNI-Virtuosi	1:14.888	+0.085s	3
4	25	(Italy) Luca Ghiotto	Hitech Grand Prix	1:14.974	+0.171s	4
5	9	(United Kingdom) Jack Aitken	Campos Racing	1:14.976	+0.173s	5
6	21	(Russia) Robert Shwartzman	Prema Racing	1:14.978	+0.175s	6
7	8	(India) Jehan Daruvala	Carlin	1:15.063	+0.260s	7
8	6	(Denmark) Christian Lundgaard	ART Grand Prix	1:15.099	+0.296s	8
9	20	(Germany) Mick Schumacher	Prema Racing	1:15.141	+0.338s	9
10	15	(Brazil) Felipe Drugovich	MP Motorsport	1:15.189	+0.386s	10
11	23	(Japan) Marino Sato	Trident	1:15.230	+0.427s	11
12	5	(New Zealand) Marcus Armstrong	ART Grand Prix	1:15.265	+0.462s	12
13	22	(Israel) Roy Nissany	Trident	1:15.274	+0.471s	13
14	14	(Japan) Nobuharu Matsushita	MP Motorsport	1:15.304	+0.501s	14
15	2	(United Kingdom) Dan Ticktum	DAMS	1:15.305	+0.502s	15
16	1	(Indonesia) Sean Gelael	DAMS	1:15.332	+0.529s	16
17	12	(Brazil) Pedro Piquet	Charouz Racing System	1:15.399	+0.596s	18
18	11	(Switzerland) Louis Delétraz	Charouz Racing System	1:15.490	+0.687s	19
19	24	(Russia) Nikita Mazepin	Hitech Grand Prix	1:15.528	+0.725s	17
20	16	(Russia) Artem Markelov	BWT HWA Racelab	1:15.681	+0.878s	20
21	17	(France) Giuliano Alesi	BWT HWA Racelab	1:15.721	+0.918s	21
22	10	(Brazil) Guilherme Samaia	Campos Racing	1:16.287	+1.484s	22

=== Feature Race ===
Pos.	No.	Driver	Entrant	Laps	Time/Retired	Grid	Points
1	21	(Russia) Robert Shwartzman	Prema Racing	36	56:32.840	6	25
2	7	(Japan) Yuki Tsunoda	Carlin	36	+1.512	1	18 (6)
3	3	(China) Guanyu Zhou	UNI-Virtuosi	36	+18.228	2	15
4	20	(Germany) Mick Schumacher	Prema Racing	36	+18.367	9	12
5	4	(United Kingdom) Callum Ilott	UNI-Virtuosi	36	+20.766	3	10
6	6	(Denmark) Christian Lundgaard	ART Grand Prix	36	+22.271	8	8
7	5	(New Zealand) Marcus Armstrong	ART Grand Prix	36	+24.710	12	6
8	2	(United Kingdom) Dan Ticktum	DAMS	36	+28.851	15	4
9	9	(United Kingdom) Jack Aitken	Campos Racing	36	+31.738	5	2
10	1	(Indonesia) Sean Gelael	DAMS	36	+32.102	16	1
11	25	(Italy) Luca Ghiotto	Hitech Grand Prix	36	+33.012	4	
12	8	(India) Jehan Daruvala	Carlin	36	+35.430	7	
13	15	(Brazil) Felipe Drugovich	MP Motorsport	36	+38.963	10	
14	24	(Russia) Nikita Mazepin	Hitech Grand Prix	36	+42.978	17	
15	22	(Israel) Roy Nissany	Trident	36	+53.122	13	
16	23	(Japan) Marino Sato	Trident	36	+54.292	11	
17	14	(Japan) Nobuharu Matsushita	MP Motorsport	36	+54.659	14	
18	12	(Brazil) Pedro Piquet	Charouz Racing System	36	+1:02.481	18	
19	11	(Switzerland) Louis Delétraz	Charouz Racing System	36	+1:11.498	19	
20	10	(Brazil) Guilherme Samaia	Campos Racing	35	+1 lap	22	
21	17	(France) Giuliano Alesi	BWT HWA Racelab	35	+1 lap	21	
DNS	16	(Russia) Artem Markelov	BWT HWA Racelab		Did not start^{1}		
Fastest lap: (Japan) Yuki Tsunoda (Carlin) — 1:27.457 (on lap 31)

Notes:

- ^1 – Artem Markelov could not start the race after spinning off into the gravel on the way to the starting grid. His grid slot was then left vacant.

=== Sprint race ===
Pos.	No.	Driver	Entrant	Laps	Time/Retired	Grid	Points
1	6	(Denmark) Christian Lundgaard	ART Grand Prix	28	36:51.582	3	15 (2)
2	2	(United Kingdom) Dan Ticktum	DAMS	28	+2.063	1	12
3	5	(New Zealand) Marcus Armstrong	ART Grand Prix	28	+10.226	2	10
4	3	(China) Guanyu Zhou	UNI-Virtuosi	28	+10.944	6	8
5	4	(United Kingdom) Callum Ilott	UNI-Virtuosi	28	+11.534	4	6
6	9	(United Kingdom) Jack Aitken	Campos Racing	28	+20.458	9	4
7	1	(Indonesia) Sean Gelael	DAMS	28	+22.955	10	2
8	24	(Russia) Nikita Mazepin	Hitech Grand Prix	28	+23.632	14	1
9	8	(India) Jehan Daruvala	Carlin	28	+24.180	12	
10	25	(Italy) Luca Ghiotto	Hitech Grand Prix	28	+27.770	11	
11	14	(Japan) Nobuharu Matsushita	MP Motorsport	28	+28.392	17	
12	11	(Switzerland) Louis Delétraz	Charouz Racing System	28	+29.247	19	
13	15	(Brazil) Felipe Drugovich	MP Motorsport	28	+32.770	13	
14	12	(Brazil) Pedro Piquet	Charouz Racing System	28	+34.113	18	
15	17	(France) Giuliano Alesi	BWT HWA Racelab	28	+41.821	21	
16	16	(Russia) Artem Markelov	BWT HWA Racelab	28	+49.240	22	
17	10	(Brazil) Guilherme Samaia	Campos Racing	28	+50.818	20	
18	22	(Israel) Roy Nissany	Trident	28	+1:11.311	15	
DNF	20	(Germany) Mick Schumacher	Prema Racing	13	Fire extinguisher	5	
DNF	7	(Japan) Yuki Tsunoda	Carlin	9	Mechanical	7	
DNF	23	(Japan) Marino Sato	Trident	1	Mechanical	16	
DNF	21	(Russia) Robert Shwartzman	Prema Racing	0	Spun off	8	
Fastest lap: (Denmark) Christian Lundgaard (ART Grand Prix) — 1:16.900 (on lap 5)

== Standings after the event ==
Drivers' Championship standings

	Pos.	Driver	Points
1	1	(Russia) Robert Shwartzman	48
5	2	(Denmark) Christian Lundgaard	43
2	3	(United Kingdom) Callum Ilott	43
	4	(United Kingdom) Dan Ticktum	36
1	5	(New Zealand) Marcus Armstrong	34

Teams' Championship standings

	Pos.	Team	Points
	1	(France) ART Grand Prix	77
	2	(United Kingdom) UNI-Virtuosi Racing	70
1	3	(Italy) Prema Racing	62
1	4	(France) DAMS	39
2	5	(Netherlands) MP Motorsport	27

- Note: Only the top five positions are included for both sets of standings.

== See also ==
- 2020 Styrian Grand Prix
- 2020 2nd Spielberg Formula 3 round

Previous round: 2020 Spielberg Formula 2 round	FIA Formula 2 Championship; 2020 season	Next round: 2020 Budapest Formula 2 round
Previous round: 2020 Spielberg Formula 2 round	Spielberg Formula 2 round	Next round: 2022 Spielberg Formula 2 round
