= 2020 Formula 2 Championship =

Motor racing championship

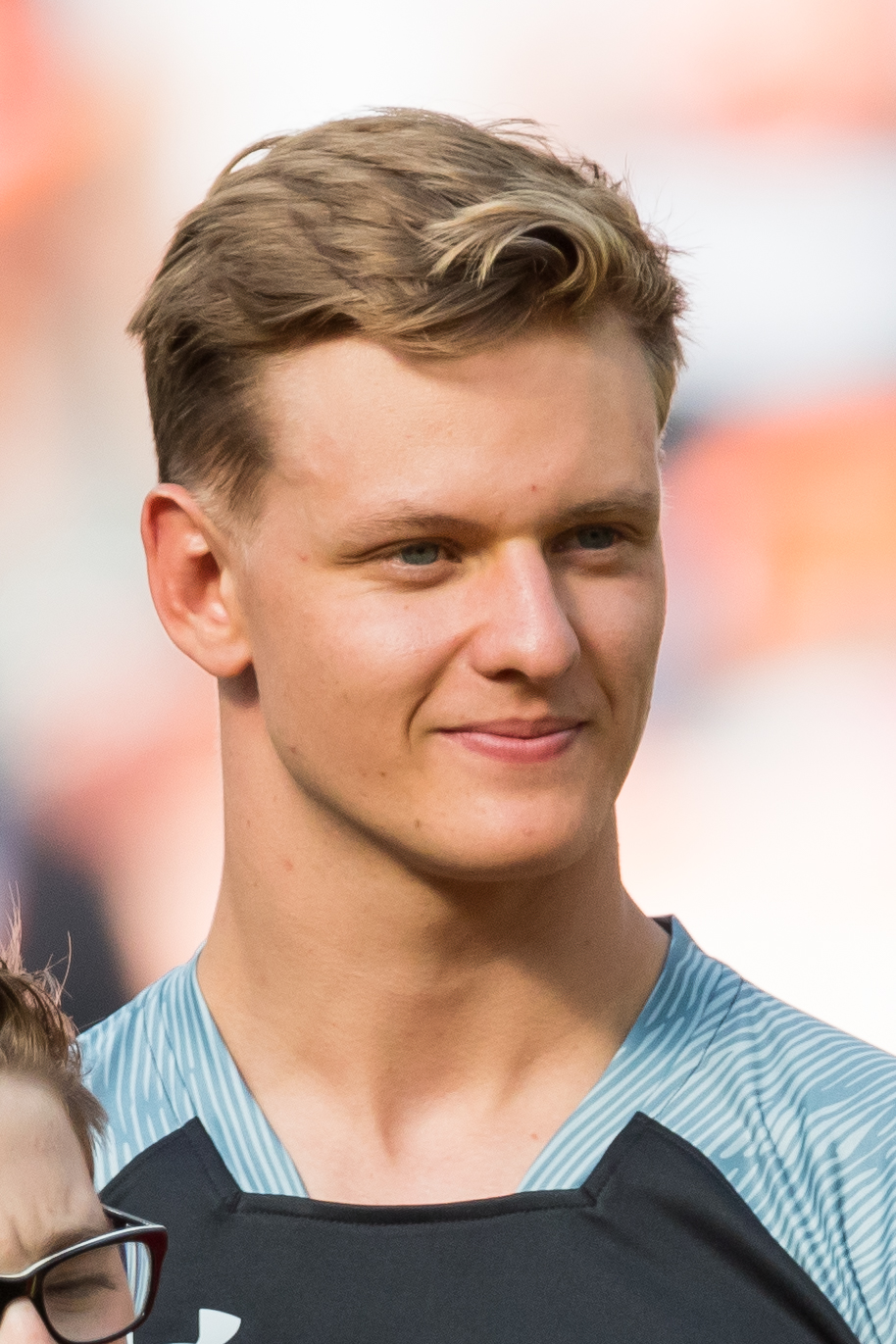
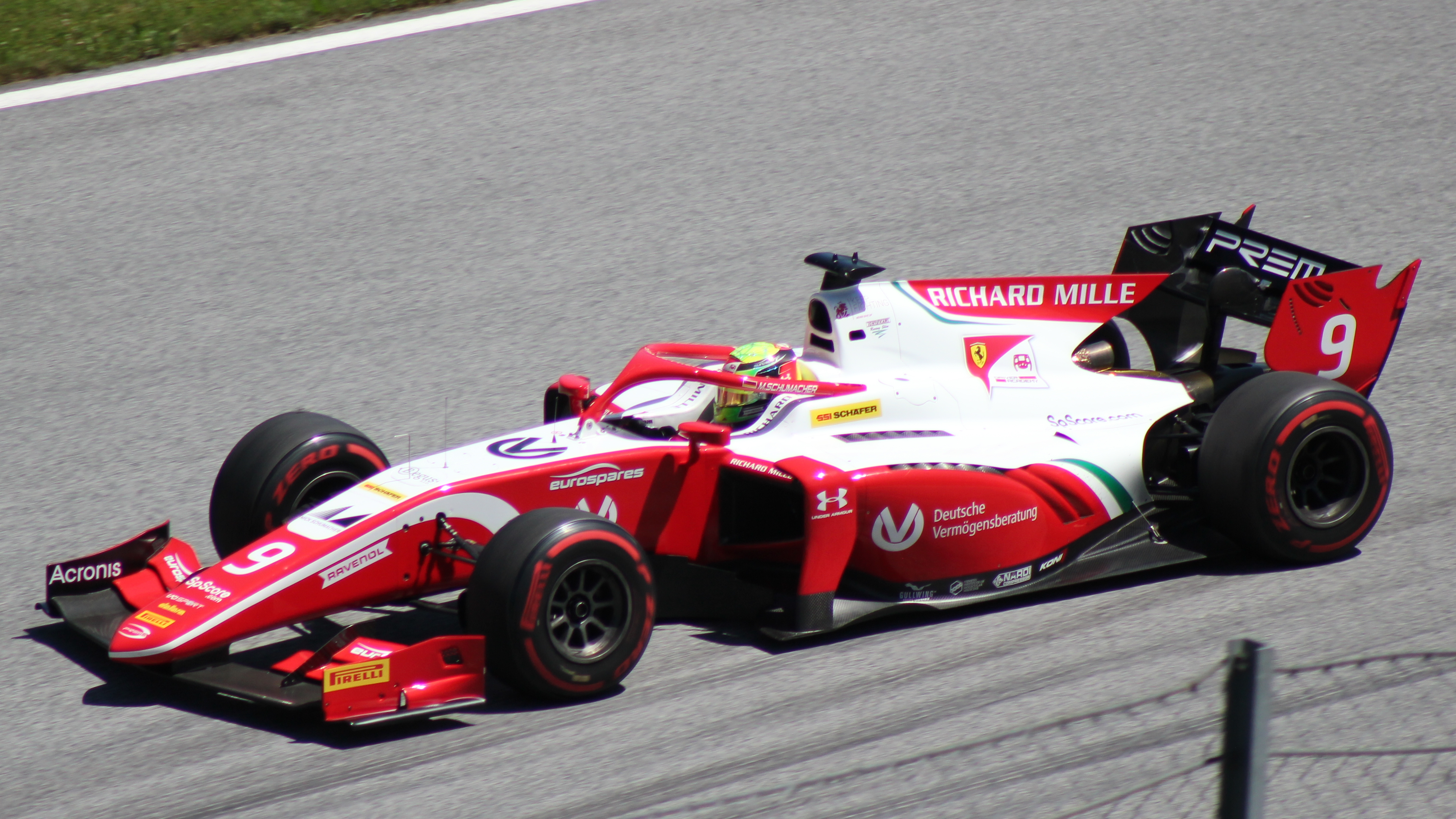
Mick Schumacher (left) and his team, Prema Racing (right), won the Drivers' and Teams' Championships, respectively.

The 2020 FIA Formula 2 Championship was a motor racing championship for Formula 2 cars, sanctioned by the Fédération Internationale de l'Automobile (FIA). The championship was the fifty-fourth season of Formula 2 racing and the fourth season run under the FIA Formula 2 Championship moniker. It is an open-wheel racing category, that serves as the second tier of formula racing in the FIA Global Pathway. The category was run in support of selected rounds of the 2020 FIA Formula One World Championship. As the championship was a spec series, all teams and drivers competing in the championship ran the same car, the Dallara F2 2018.

Nyck de Vries was the 2019 drivers' champion, having won the title at the penultimate race of the 2019 championship in Russia, (Note: Under the series' sporting regulations, the defending drivers' champion is not permitted to continue racing in the championship.) thus Mick Schumacher became the next driver to win the title at the final race in the Outer layout of the Bahrain International Circuit with 14 points ahead of runner-up Callum Ilott. DAMS were the reigning teams' champions, having secured their first Formula 2 title in Abu Dhabi. Prema Racing became the next team to clinch teams' title for the first time, after the finish of the feature race in the Outer layout of the Bahrain International Circuit.

2020 was due to be the final season with the Dallara F2 2018 chassis package which debuted in 2018 with a new chassis introduced for 2021. This was delayed for another three seasons due to the COVID-19 pandemic.

The season would see a record 12 different race winners: with the most race victories of 4 for Robert Shwartzman, 3 wins went to Callum Ilott, Yuki Tsunoda and Felipe Drugovich. 2 races were won by champion Mick Schumacher, Christian Lundgaard and Nikita Mazepin. Other drivers, who won a race were victorious once: victories went to Luca Ghiotto and Nobuharu Matsushita, (for both of them victories were final in the series before retiring from F2), and others: Dan Ticktum and Jehan Daruvala with last winner being Guanyu Zhou.

== Entries ==
The following teams and drivers are under contract to compete in the 2020 championship. As the championship is a spec series, all competitors race with an identical Dallara F2 2018 chassis with a V6 turbo engine developed by Mecachrome and with tyres supplied by Pirelli.

Entrant	No.	Driver name	Rounds
(France) DAMS	1	(Indonesia) Sean Gelael	1–6, 11–12
(France) DAMS	1	(Estonia) Jüri Vips	7–10
(France) DAMS	2	(United Kingdom) Dan Ticktum	All
(United Kingdom) UNI-Virtuosi Racing	3	(China) Guanyu Zhou	All
(United Kingdom) UNI-Virtuosi Racing	4	(United Kingdom) Callum Ilott	All
(France) ART Grand Prix	5	(New Zealand) Marcus Armstrong	All
(France) ART Grand Prix	6	(Denmark) Christian Lundgaard	All
(United Kingdom) Carlin	7	(Japan) Yuki Tsunoda	All
(United Kingdom) Carlin	8	(India) Jehan Daruvala	All
(Spain) Campos Racing	9	(United Kingdom) Jack Aitken	1–11
(Spain) Campos Racing	9	(Switzerland) Ralph Boschung	12
(Spain) Campos Racing	10	(Brazil) Guilherme Samaia	All
(Czech Republic) Charouz Racing System	11	(Switzerland) Louis Delétraz	All
(Czech Republic) Charouz Racing System	12	(Brazil) Pedro Piquet	All
(Netherlands) MP Motorsport	14	(Japan) Nobuharu Matsushita	1–9
(Netherlands) MP Motorsport	14	(France) Giuliano Alesi	10–12
(Netherlands) MP Motorsport	15	(Brazil) Felipe Drugovich	All
(Germany) BWT HWA Racelab	16	(Russia) Artem Markelov	All
(Germany) BWT HWA Racelab	17	(France) Giuliano Alesi	1–9
(Germany) BWT HWA Racelab	17	(United Kingdom) Jake Hughes	10
(Germany) BWT HWA Racelab	17	(France) Théo Pourchaire	11–12
(Italy) Prema Racing (Note: Under the numbering system used prior to 2020, Prema Racing would have been assigned #18 and #19. However, the FIA retired #19 from the series after Anthoine Hubert's death and so Prema Racing were assigned #20 and #21 instead.)	20	(Germany) Mick Schumacher	All
(Italy) Prema Racing	21	(Russia) Robert Shwartzman	All
(Italy) Trident	22	(Israel) Roy Nissany	All
(Italy) Trident	23	(Japan) Marino Sato	All
(United Kingdom) Hitech Grand Prix	24	(Russia) Nikita Mazepin	All
(United Kingdom) Hitech Grand Prix	25	(Italy) Luca Ghiotto	All

=== Team changes ===
Hitech Grand Prix joined the championship, bringing the total number of teams up to eleven. HWA Racelab replaced Arden International on the grid. HWA had formed a technical partnership with the team in 2019.

=== Driver changes ===
Reigning team champions DAMS fielded a new driver line-up. Sérgio Sette Câmara left to compete in Super Formula and Nicholas Latifi graduated to Formula One with Williams. They were replaced by Sean Gelael, who left Prema Racing, and two-time Macau Grand Prix winner Dan Ticktum.

Luca Ghiotto left UNI-Virtuosi to join the new Hitech Grand Prix team. Callum Ilott moved from Sauber Junior Team by Charouz to replace him.

Reigning champion Nyck de Vries left ART Grand Prix and the championship to join Mercedes in Formula E. Nikita Mazepin also left the team to join Ghiotto at Hitech Grand Prix. Their seats were taken by Marcus Armstrong and Christian Lundgaard, who finished second and sixth respectively in the 2019 FIA Formula 3 Championship. Lundgaard had made his Formula 2 debut with Trident at the final race of the 2019 season.

Carlin signed two new drivers for 2020. Louis Delétraz left the team to rejoin Charouz Racing System, the team he had competed with in 2018, and Nobuharu Matsushita moved to MP Motorsport. They were replaced by Red Bull juniors Jehan Daruvala and Yuki Tsunoda, who graduated from the FIA Formula 3 Championship having finished third and ninth respectively in 2019.

Campos Racing did not retain reigning Euroformula Open champion Marino Sato, who competed for the team in the final races of 2019. Sato moved to Trident, with Campos hiring Formula 3 Brasil champion Guilherme Samaia to replace him.

Charouz Racing System driver Juan Manuel Correa was ruled out of the 2020 championship due to his injuries from the 2019 Spa-Francorchamps FIA Formula 2 round, while Matevos Isaakyan—who replaced Correa for the final races of the 2019 championship—was not retained. The team signed 2019 FIA Formula 3 fifth-placed finisher Pedro Piquet to partner Louis Delétraz for 2020.

Jordan King and Mahaveer Raghunathan both left MP Motorsport and the championship. The team hired 2018 Euroformula Open champion Felipe Drugovich to partner Nobuharu Matsushita.

BWT HWA Racelab retained Artem Markelov, who raced for the team in the final races of 2019 as a replacement for the late Anthoine Hubert. Tatiana Calderón left the championship to compete in Super Formula and Giuliano Alesi switched from Trident to replace her.

Reigning FIA Formula 3 champion Robert Shwartzman graduated to the championship with Prema Racing, replacing Sean Gelael.

Trident hired Roy Nissany, who last competed in Formula 2 in 2018 with Campos, to partner Marino Sato.

=== Midseason changes ===
Sean Gelael suffered a broken vertebra during the last lap of the feature race in Barcelona when he collided with Jack Aitken. As a result, Gelael was declared unfit to participate in Spa and the following three rounds, leaving his DAMS seat vacant. The team hired Red Bull Junior driver Jüri Vips as an interim driver.

Matsushita left the MP Motorsport team after the Mugello round, and Alesi moved across from BWT HWA Racelab to replace him with immediate effect. HWA's FIA Formula 3 Championship driver Jake Hughes graduated to Formula 2 to replace Alesi.

2020 FIA Formula 3 Championship runner-up Théo Pourchaire was promoted to Formula 2 for the last two races, replacing Hughes at BWT HWA Racelab.

At the Formula One Sakhir Grand Prix, Campos Racing driver Jack Aitken was called up to the Williams Formula One team as a replacement for 2018 Formula 2 champion George Russell, who replaced an absent Lewis Hamilton. Ralph Boschung stood in for Aitken for the final round of the championship.

== Calendar ==
Both the original and revised calendars had twelve rounds scheduled to take place as part of the 2020 championship. Each round consists of two races: a Feature race, which is run on Saturday, over a distance of 170 km (105.6 mi) and includes a mandatory pit stop; (Note: The Monaco and Budapest feature races are run over a reduced distance, with a length of 140 km (87.0 mi) and 160 km (99.4 mi) respectively.) and a Sprint race, which is run over 120 km (75 mi) and does not require drivers to make a pit stop. (Note: The Feature and Sprint races are time-certain. In the event that the full race distance cannot be completed, the Feature race will end after one hour and the Sprint race after forty-five minutes.)

Round	Circuit	Feature race	Sprint race
1	(Austria) Red Bull Ring, Spielberg	4 July	5 July
2	(Austria) Red Bull Ring, Spielberg	11 July	12 July
3	(Hungary) Hungaroring, Mogyoród	18 July	19 July
4	(United Kingdom) Silverstone Circuit, Silverstone	1 August	2 August
5	(United Kingdom) Silverstone Circuit, Silverstone	8 August	9 August
6	(Spain) Circuit de Barcelona-Catalunya, Montmeló	15 August	16 August
7	(Belgium) Circuit de Spa-Francorchamps, Stavelot	29 August	30 August
8	(Italy) Autodromo Nazionale di Monza, Monza	5 September	6 September
9	(Italy) Mugello Circuit, Scarperia e San Piero	12 September	13 September
10	(Russia) Sochi Autodrom, Sochi	26 September	27 September
11	Bahrain International Circuit, Sakhir	28 November	29 November
12	Bahrain International Circuit, Sakhir	5 December	6 December
–	(United Arab Emirates) Yas Marina Circuit, Abu Dhabi	Cancelled (Note: The Abu Dhabi races were due to take place on 28 and 29 November, but were cancelled due to the COVID-19 pandemic.)	
–	(Azerbaijan) Baku City Circuit, Baku	Cancelled (Note: The Baku races were due to take place on 6 and 7 June, but were cancelled due to the COVID-19 pandemic.)	
–	(Netherlands) Circuit Zandvoort, Zandvoort	Cancelled (Note: The Zandvoort races were due to take place on 2 and 3 May, but were cancelled due to the COVID-19 pandemic.)	
–	Circuit de Monaco, Monte Carlo	Cancelled (Note: The Monaco races were due to take place on 22 and 23 May, but was cancelled due to the COVID-19 pandemic.)	

=== Calendar changes ===
The Circuit Paul Ricard round that was run in support of the French Grand Prix was removed from the calendar. It was replaced by a round at the Circuit Zandvoort, running in support of the revived Dutch Grand Prix. The Bahrain and Barcelona rounds were postponed in response to the COVID-19 pandemic, while the Zandvoort, Monaco and Baku rounds were cancelled alongside the Dutch, Monaco and Azerbaijan Grands Prix. A revised calendar was published in June 2020, featuring two rounds at the Red Bull Ring and two at the Silverstone Circuit. On 10 July 2020, Mugello was added as the ninth round of the season. It was the first time for this circuit to be featured in the schedule of the main Formula One feeder series since the 1997 International Formula 3000 Championship. On 29 July 2020, Sochi was added to the calendar as the tenth round of the season. The championship used the Outer Circuit layout for the season finale at Bahrain.

== Regulation changes ==
=== Technical changes ===
The championship increased the wheel rims from 330 to 460 mm (13 to 18 in) to allow Formula One tyre partner Pirelli to gather data on how the larger tyres would work ahead of Formula One's adoption of 460 mm wheels in 2022. In addition the Pirelli FIA Formula 2 Championship tyre sizes were also slightly altered with the front tyre width increased from 245 to 275 mm (9.6 to 10.8 in) while the rear tyre width remained same at 325 mm (12.8 in). The overall tyre diameter (front and rear) sizes were increased from 660 to 705 mm (26.0 to 27.8 in) as a result of 460 mm wheel rim introduction. The conventional 330 mm wheel rims that had been used since 2005 were retired.

== Season report ==
=== Opening rounds ===
UNI-Virtuosi's Guanyu Zhou started the season opener at the Red Bull Ring from pole position alongside series debutant Felipe Drugovich in second place. Zhou led the majority of the race and fought closely with teammate Callum Ilott and Prema Racing's Mick Schumacher. A technical issue later dropped Zhou to the back and Schumacher's chance of victory was lost after a trip through the gravel at turn six, allowing Ilott to claim his first Formula 2 race victory. Drugovich started the sprint race on pole position by virtue of finishing eighth in the feature race. He maintained the lead for the whole race distance to take his debut win in Formula 2. The opening round finished with Ilott leading the championship, four points ahead of Prema's Robert Shwartzman.

Formula 2 remained at the Red Bull Ring on the following weekend, where Carlin's Yuki Tsunoda took pole position. The feature race began under safety car conditions due to wet weather. Tsunoda led for most of the race, but radio issues prevented him from hearing his team's call to enter the pits, causing the gap behind him to close as his tyres degraded. After eventually making a pit stop, he had lost position to Shwartzman, Ilott and Zhou. Tsunoda recovered to second place but was unable to overtake Shwartzman, who took his first Formula 2 victory and the championship lead. Tsunoda and Shwartzman both retired from the sprint race, Tsunoda with a suspected clutch issue and Shwartzman after spinning on the opening lap. ART Grand Prix's Christian Lundgaard overtook reverse-grid pole sitter Dan Ticktum to claim his maiden Formula 2 victory. Despite his retirement, Shwartzman maintained the lead of the championship by five points over Ilott.

Ilott claimed pole position in the wet qualifying session at the Hungaroring. During the feature race he traded the lead with Schumacher, but fell down the order in the closing laps as his medium-compound tyres degraded. Conversely, Shwartzman and Hitech Grand Prix's Nikita Mazepin, who started the race 11th and 16th respectively, switched from medium to soft-compound tyres later in the race. This proved to be the superior strategy and Shwartzman came through the field to take his second consecutive feature race victory, with Mazepin second. Ilott started on pole position for the sprint race. Whilst most drivers elected to make a pit stop, Hitech's Luca Ghiotto did not. This left Ghiotto in the lead with a 40-second gap behind to Ilott, which rapidly closed over the final ten laps. Ilott was ultimately unable to pass Ghiotto, who took his sixth Formula 2 victory by less than half a second. After the Hungaroring round, Shwartzman had extended his championship lead over Ilott to 18 points.

=== Mid-season ===
The first round at Silverstone saw MP Motorsport's Felipe Drugovich take his team's first ever Formula 2 pole position, whilst championship leader Shwartzman qualified 18th. Second-placed Ilott stalled on the formation lap and was forced to start from the pit lane. Schumacher took the lead at the start, but was overtaken by Mazepin soon after. Mazepin led the rest of the race to take his maiden Formula 2 race win. Dan Ticktum started the sprint race from pole position and maintained his lead. Ilott, who had been running closely behind Ticktum in the final laps, was forced into retirement after a spin, and Ticktum held off Christian Lundgaard on the final lap to achieve his first victory. Despite scoring no points, Shwartzman held his championship lead over Ilott by eight points after the fourth round.

Ilott returned to pole position for the second round at Silverstone and led the entire feature race to take his second victory of the season. Shwartzman finished eighth, losing his championship lead to Ilott but giving him reverse-grid pole position for the sprint race. He led for most of the race with teammate Schumacher close behind, but the two collided with two laps remaining, damaging Shwartzman's front wing and relegating him to the back. This allowed Yuki Tsunoda through to claim his first Formula 2 race win. After round five, Ilott led the championship by 19 points over Christian Lundgaard.

Ilott again took pole position at the Circuit de Barcelona-Catalunya. He traded the lead of the race with Shwartzman and Schumacher but had reclaimed first place by lap 25, when a collision between Sean Gelael and Giuliano Alesi brought out the safety car. Whilst most drivers had made a pit stop earlier in the race after starting on soft-compound tyres, MP Motorsport's Nobuharu Matsushita had stayed out after starting from 18th place on hard tyres. He made his first stop under safety car conditions, elevating him to third place. He was then able to pass Ilott and Tsunoda to take the lead and achieve MP Motorsport's first ever Formula 2 feature race victory. A collision between Gelael and Jack Aitken on the final lap resulted in Gelael suffering a broken vertebra, forcing him to miss the sprint race. Luca Ghiotto began the sprint race on pole position but was passed by Felipe Drugovich at the start, who held the position to take his second victory of the season. Ilott kept the championship lead after round six by 18 points over Shwartzman.

Tsunoda achieved his second pole position in the seventh round at Spa-Francorchamps, where Jüri Vips made his Formula 2 debut replacing the injured Gelael at DAMS. Tsunoda was closely followed by Nikita Mazepin in the feature race until a slow pit stop handed Mazepin the lead. Mazepin held off attacks from Tsunoda to cross the line in first place, but he was issued with a time penalty for forcing Tsunoda off the track, awarding Tsunoda his second win of the season. Trident's Roy Nissany started on pole position for the sprint race, in which championship leader Ilott was forced into retirement after a collision with Tsunoda. Nissany and Dan Ticktum traded the lead in the early laps before the two collided, sending Nissany into the barriers. This allowed Shwartzman through to claim his third win of the season, as well as the lead of the championship by 10 points over Ilott.

Ilott repeated his 2019 success in qualifying at Monza, claiming pole position. Mick Schumacher, who started seventh, passed multiple drivers at the start to take second behind Ilott at the first corner. Ilott stalled his car during his pit stop, dropping him to the back of the field and allowing Schumacher through to take his first victory of the season. Charouz Racing System driver Louis Delétraz started on reverse-grid pole position, but was passed by Dan Ticktum before the first corner, who controlled the rest of the race to claim what would have been his second win of the season. However, Ticktum ran out of fuel on his return to the pits, and his team were not able to supply a sufficient fuel sample to the FIA. Thus, Ticktum was disqualified, and Ilott inherited the win. This allowed Ilott to retake the championship lead, six points ahead of Schumacher in second.

=== Closing rounds ===
Christian Lundgaard achieved his first pole position in qualifying at Mugello and controlled the feature race until the closing laps. Nikita Mazepin, who started 14th, was able to take advantage of an alternative tyre strategy and accidents ahead to claim the lead with two laps to go. He led a Hitech one-two at the finish line ahead of teammate Luca Ghiotto. Shwartzman, Ilott and Tsunoda all failed to score, allowing Schumacher to claim the championship lead for the first time after finishing fifth. HWA Racelab's Artem Markelov started on pole position in the sprint race, from which Mazepin and Ghiotto were eliminated after colliding with each other. Lundgaard took the lead of the race at the start and led the rest of the distance to take his second win of the season. Schumacher finished fourth ahead of Ilott in sixth, allowing Schumacher to extend his championship lead to eight points.

In Sochi, Tsunoda started the feature race from pole position. He was overtaken by Schumacher with nine laps remaining, who went on to take his second victory of the season. Title challenger Ilott finished third. The sprint race began with Guanyu Zhou on pole position. On lap seven of 21, Luca Ghiotto attempted an overtake on Campos driver Jack Aitken for fourth place around the outside of the long turn four. The drivers made contact and both crashed into the barriers at high-speed, after which Ghiotto's car caught fire. Both drivers escaped unharmed, but the race was red-flagged and not restarted since the barriers could not be repaired in time. Zhou was awarded the race win, his first in Formula 2. Half-points were given as less than 75% of the scheduled race distance was completed. After round 10, Schumacher's championship lead over Ilott had extended to 22 points.

Round 11 at the Bahrain International Circuit began with Ilott on pole position and championship leader Schumacher qualifying 10th. Ilott and Felipe Drugovich traded the lead during the feature race. Drugovich eventually built a gap and finished ahead of Ilott to claim his third victory of the season. Robert Shwartzman started the sprint race from pole position and converted this into his fourth win of the season. Ilott failed to score after colliding with Carlin's Jehan Daruvala and receiving a drive-through penalty. Schumacher finished seventh to hold his championship lead over Ilott by 14 points.

Yuki Tsunoda took his fourth pole position for the final round on Bahrain's outer layout. Ilott qualified ninth, with Schumacher only 18th after colliding with Roy Nissany in qualifying. Tsunoda, Shwartzman and Nikita Mazepin battled for the lead during the feature race, before Tsunoda built a gap and claimed his third win of the season. Ilott and Schumacher were classified fifth and sixth respectively after Mazepin was penalised for illegal defending. Schumacher recorded the fastest lap of the race, meaning his 14-point advantage in the championship went unchanged going into the final race and guaranteeing him the title if Ilott failed to finish the sprint race in the top two. Dan Ticktum took reverse-grid pole position and was later passed by Jehan Daruvala, who claimed his first Formula 2 victory. Schumacher locked his tyres multiple times during the race and made two pit stops, dropping him to the back. Ilott had run in third place but dropped back due to tyre degradation, eventually finishing outside the points. Schumacher crossed the line 18th to become the 2020 Formula 2 champion.

Three drivers would graduate to Formula One at the end of the season. Champion Schumacher and fifth-placed Mazepin joined Haas F1 Team. Third-placed Tsunoda, who won the Anthoine Hubert Award as the highest-placed rookie in the championship, joined Scuderia AlphaTauri. Runner-up Ilott joined Scuderia Ferrari as a test driver.

== Results and standings ==
=== Season summary ===
Round		Circuit	Pole position	Fastest lap	Winning driver	Winning team	Report
1	F	(Austria) Red Bull Ring	(China) Guanyu Zhou	(China) Guanyu Zhou (Note: Guanyu Zhou set the fastest lap, but did not finish in the top 10, so was ineligible to be the point-scorer for the fastest lap. Callum Ilott was the point-scorer instead for setting the fastest lap of those finishing in the top 10.)	(United Kingdom) Callum Ilott	(United Kingdom) UNI-Virtuosi Racing	Report
1	S	(Austria) Red Bull Ring		(Brazil) Felipe Drugovich	(Brazil) Felipe Drugovich	(Netherlands) MP Motorsport	Report
2	F	(Austria) Red Bull Ring	(Japan) Yuki Tsunoda	(Israel) Roy Nissany (Note: Roy Nissany set the fastest lap, but did not finish in the top 10, so was ineligible to be the point-scorer for the fastest lap. Yuki Tsunoda was the point-scorer instead for setting the fastest lap of those finishing in the top 10.)	(Russia) Robert Shwartzman	(Italy) Prema Racing	Report
2	S	(Austria) Red Bull Ring		(Israel) Roy Nissany (Note: Roy Nissany set the fastest lap, but did not finish in the top 10, so was ineligible to be the point-scorer for the fastest lap. Christian Lundgaard was the point-scorer instead for setting the fastest lap of those finishing in the top 10.)	(Denmark) Christian Lundgaard	(France) ART Grand Prix	Report
3	F	(Hungary) Hungaroring	(United Kingdom) Callum Ilott	(Russia) Nikita Mazepin	(Russia) Robert Shwartzman	(Italy) Prema Racing	Report
3	S	(Hungary) Hungaroring		(China) Guanyu Zhou	(Italy) Luca Ghiotto	(United Kingdom) Hitech Grand Prix	Report
4	F	(United Kingdom) Silverstone Circuit	(Brazil) Felipe Drugovich	(China) Guanyu Zhou	(Russia) Nikita Mazepin	(United Kingdom) Hitech Grand Prix	Report
4	S	(United Kingdom) Silverstone Circuit		(Denmark) Christian Lundgaard	(United Kingdom) Dan Ticktum	(France) DAMS	Report
5	F	(United Kingdom) Silverstone Circuit	(United Kingdom) Callum Ilott	(India) Jehan Daruvala (Note: Jehan Daruvala set the fastest lap, but did not finish in the top 10, so was ineligible to be the point-scorer for the fastest lap. Guanyu Zhou was the point-scorer instead for setting the fastest lap of those finishing in the top 10.)	(United Kingdom) Callum Ilott	(United Kingdom) UNI-Virtuosi Racing	Report
5	S	(United Kingdom) Silverstone Circuit		(Denmark) Christian Lundgaard (Note: Christian Lundgaard set the fastest lap, but did not finish in the top 10, so was ineligible to be the point-scorer for the fastest lap. Mick Schumacher was the point-scorer instead for setting the fastest lap of those finishing in the top 10.)	(Japan) Yuki Tsunoda	(United Kingdom) Carlin	Report
6	F	(Spain) Circuit de Barcelona-Catalunya	(United Kingdom) Callum Ilott	(Japan) Nobuharu Matsushita	(Japan) Nobuharu Matsushita	(Netherlands) MP Motorsport	Report
6	S	(Spain) Circuit de Barcelona-Catalunya		(France) Giuliano Alesi (Note: Giuliano Alesi set the fastest lap, but did not finish in the top 10, so was ineligible to be the point-scorer for the fastest lap. Dan Ticktum was the point-scorer instead for setting the fastest lap of those finishing in the top 10.)	(Brazil) Felipe Drugovich	(Netherlands) MP Motorsport	Report
7	F	(Belgium) Circuit de Spa-Francorchamps	(Japan) Yuki Tsunoda	(Russia) Robert Shwartzman	(Japan) Yuki Tsunoda	(United Kingdom) Carlin	Report
7	S	(Belgium) Circuit de Spa-Francorchamps		(United Kingdom) Jack Aitken (Note: Jack Aitken set the fastest lap, but did not finish in the top 10, so was ineligible to be the point-scorer for the fastest lap. Robert Shwartzman was the point-scorer instead for setting the fastest lap of those finishing in the top 10.)	(Russia) Robert Shwartzman	(Italy) Prema Racing	Report
8	F	(Italy) Autodromo Nazionale di Monza	(United Kingdom) Callum Ilott	(Italy) Luca Ghiotto	(Germany) Mick Schumacher	(Italy) Prema Racing	Report
8	S	(Italy) Autodromo Nazionale di Monza		(Japan) Yuki Tsunoda (Note: Yuki Tsunoda set the fastest lap, but did not finish in the top 10, so was ineligible to be the point-scorer for the fastest lap. Mick Schumacher was the point-scorer instead for setting the fastest lap of those finishing in the top 10.)	(United Kingdom) Callum Ilott (Note: Dan Ticktum finished first on the track, but was disqualified as his team was unable to provide a sufficient fuel sample.)	(United Kingdom) UNI-Virtuosi Racing	Report
9	F	(Italy) Mugello Circuit	(Denmark) Christian Lundgaard	(China) Guanyu Zhou (Note: Guanyu Zhou set the fastest lap, but did not finish in the top 10, so was ineligible to be the point-scorer for the fastest lap. Louis Delétraz was the point-scorer instead for setting the fastest lap of those finishing in the top 10.)	(Russia) Nikita Mazepin	(United Kingdom) Hitech Grand Prix	Report
9	S	(Italy) Mugello Circuit		(United Kingdom) Dan Ticktum (Note: Dan Ticktum set the fastest lap, but did not finish in the top 10, so was ineligible to be the point-scorer for the fastest lap. Christian Lundgaard was the point-scorer instead for setting the fastest lap of those finishing in the top 10.)	(Denmark) Christian Lundgaard	(France) ART Grand Prix	Report
10	F	(Russia) Sochi Autodrom	(Japan) Yuki Tsunoda	(Switzerland) Louis Delétraz (Note: Louis Delétraz set the fastest lap, but did not finish in the top 10, so was ineligible to be the point-scorer for the fastest lap. Dan Ticktum was the point-scorer instead for setting the fastest lap of those finishing in the top 10.)	(Germany) Mick Schumacher	(Italy) Prema Racing	Report
10	S	(Russia) Sochi Autodrom		(Russia) Nikita Mazepin	(China) Guanyu Zhou	(United Kingdom) UNI-Virtuosi Racing	Report
11	F	Bahrain International Circuit; Layout: Grand Prix Circuit	(United Kingdom) Callum Ilott	(Italy) Luca Ghiotto (Note: Luca Ghiotto set the fastest lap, but did not finish in the top 10, so was ineligible to be the point-scorer for the fastest lap. Yuki Tsunoda was the point-scorer instead for setting the fastest lap of those finishing in the top 10.)	(Brazil) Felipe Drugovich	(Netherlands) MP Motorsport	Report
11	S	Bahrain International Circuit; Layout: Grand Prix Circuit		(Switzerland) Louis Delétraz	(Russia) Robert Shwartzman	(Italy) Prema Racing	Report
12	F	Bahrain International Circuit; Layout: Outer Circuit	(Japan) Yuki Tsunoda	(Germany) Mick Schumacher	(Japan) Yuki Tsunoda	(United Kingdom) Carlin	Report
12	S	Bahrain International Circuit; Layout: Outer Circuit		(Germany) Mick Schumacher (Note: Mick Schumacher set the fastest lap, but did not finish in the top 10, so was ineligible to be the point-scorer for the fastest lap. Yuki Tsunoda was the point-scorer instead for setting the fastest lap of those finishing in the top 10.)	(India) Jehan Daruvala	(United Kingdom) Carlin	Report

=== Scoring system ===
Points are awarded to the top 10 classified finishers in the Feature race, and to the top 8 classified finishers in the Sprint race. The pole-sitter in the feature race also receives four points, and two points is given to the driver who sets the fastest lap inside the top ten in both the feature and sprint races. No extra points are awarded to the pole-sitter in the sprint race as the grid for the sprint race is based on the results of the feature race with the top eight drivers having their positions reversed.

Feature race points

Position	**1st**	**2nd**	**3rd**	**4th**	**5th**	**6th**	**7th**	**8th**	**9th**	**10th**	**Pole**	**FL**
Points	25	18	15	12	10	8	6	4	2	1	4	2

Sprint race points

Points are awarded to the top eight classified finishers, excluding the fastest lap points which are given to the top ten classified finishers.

Position	**1st**	**2nd**	**3rd**	**4th**	**5th**	**6th**	**7th**	**8th**	**FL**
Points	15	12	10	8	6	4	2	1	2

=== Drivers' championship ===
Pos.	Driver	RBR1 (Austria)		RBR2 (Austria)		HUN (Hungary)		SIL1 (United Kingdom)		SIL2 (United Kingdom)		CAT (Spain)		SPA (Belgium)		MNZ (Italy)		MUG (Italy)		SOC^{‡} (Russia)		BHR1 (Bahrain)		BHR2 (Bahrain)		Points
Pos.	Driver	FR	SR	FR	SR	FR	SR	FR	SR	FR	SR	FR	SR	FR	SR	FR	SR	FR	SR	FR	SR	FR	SR	FR	SR	Points
1	(Germany) Mick Schumacher	11	7	4	Ret	3	3	9	14	7	2^{F}	6	3	3	2	1	3^{F}	5	4	1	3	4	7	6^{F}	18	215
2	(United Kingdom) Callum Ilott	1^{F}	9	5	5	8^{P}	2	5	Ret	1^{P}	6	5^{P}	8	10	Ret	6^{P}	1	12	6	3	7	2^{P}	16	5	10	201
3	(Japan) Yuki Tsunoda	18	11	2^{P F}	Ret	16	18	3	Ret	6	1	4	4	1^{P}	9	4	NC	16	19	2^{P}	6	6^{F}	15	1^{P}	2^{F}	200
4	(Russia) Robert Shwartzman	3	4	1	Ret	1	4	14	13	8	13	2	13	5^{F}	1^{F}	9	5	Ret	9	11	10	8	1	4	5	177
5	(Russia) Nikita Mazepin	14	10	14	8	2^{F}	5	1	5	4	8	13	6	2	4	NC	8	1	18	7	2^{F}	5	2	9	9	164
6	(China) Guanyu Zhou	17^{P}	14	3	4	10	8^{F}	2^{F}	9	9^{F}	5	3	14	7	3	5	NC	Ret	5	8	1	14	5	2	4	151.5
7	(Denmark) Christian Lundgaard	4	5	6	1^{F}	Ret	13	4	2^{F}	2	21	11	11	17	7	3	2	6^{P}	1^{F}	Ret	13	19	6	21	12	149
8	(Switzerland) Louis Delétraz	7	2	19	12	7	6	6	3	5	4	10	9	4	6	8	4	3^{F}	2	18	17	16	3^{F}	12	13	134
9	(Brazil) Felipe Drugovich	8	1^{F}	13	13	5	16	7^{P}	6	10	12	7	1	DSQ	13	16	Ret	4	15	Ret	20	1	8	3	8	121
10	(Italy) Luca Ghiotto	DNS	Ret	11	10	4	1	17	19†	13	10	8	2	9	5	2^{F}	15	2	Ret	4	5	12	Ret	16	7	106
11	(United Kingdom) Dan Ticktum	5	3	8	2	9	NC	8	1	15	7	9	10^{F}	6	10	7	DSQ	17	17	10^{F}	8	9	12	8	3	96.5
12	(India) Jehan Daruvala	12	16	12	9	6	7	12	4	12	9	17	17	19	16	10	6	10	7	5	11	3	Ret	7	1	72
13	(New Zealand) Marcus Armstrong	2	Ret	7	3	Ret	9	16	10	14	14	Ret	15	15	Ret	14	18	9	11	9	14	7	4	11	14	52
14	(United Kingdom) Jack Aitken	15	8	9	6	13	19	13	8	3	3	18†	18	13	17	13	7	Ret	13	6	4	10	17†			48
15	(Japan) Nobuharu Matsushita	9	6	17	11	12	11	10	7	11	18	1^{F}	5	Ret	DNS	15	11	11	14							42
16	(Estonia) Jüri Vips													11	11	11	9	7	3	Ret	18					16
17	(France) Giuliano Alesi	6	Ret	21	15	11	10	19	18	16	20	Ret	19	18	14	18	12	Ret	Ret	14	16	17	13	15	6	12
18	(Russia) Artem Markelov	Ret	18	DNS	16	Ret	14	18	11	19	11	12	16	16	8	17	16	8	20	15	12	22	10	13	20	5
19	(Israel) Roy Nissany	10	12	15^{F}	18^{F}	Ret	17	Ret	16	18	15	Ret	12	8	Ret	19	10	15	10	Ret	19	15	9	20	15	5
20	(Brazil) Pedro Piquet	13	13	18	14	14	15	11	17	21	16	14	7	12	12	12	17	13	12	17	9	11	19†	10	11	3
21	(Indonesia) Sean Gelael	Ret	Ret	10	7	17	12	15	Ret	Ret	DNS	19†	DNS									13	14	19	17	3
22	(Japan) Marino Sato	Ret	17	16	Ret	Ret	20	20	12	17	17	15	21	14	Ret	20	13	14	8	13	15	20	11	17	16	1
23	(United Kingdom) Jake Hughes																			12	Ret					0
24	(Brazil) Guilherme Samaia	16	15	20	17	15	21	21	15	20	19	16	20	Ret	15	21	14	18	16	16	Ret	21	18†	22	19	0
25	(Switzerland) Ralph Boschung																							14	Ret	0
26	(France) Théo Pourchaire																					18	Ret	18	21	0
Pos.	Driver	FR	SR	FR	SR	FR	SR	FR	SR	FR	SR	FR	SR	FR	SR	FR	SR	FR	SR	FR	SR	FR	SR	FR	SR	Points
Pos.	Driver	RBR1 (Austria)		RBR2 (Austria)		HUN (Hungary)		SIL1 (United Kingdom)		SIL2 (United Kingdom)		CAT (Spain)		SPA (Belgium)		MNZ (Italy)		MUG (Italy)		SOC (Russia)		BHR1 (Bahrain)		BHR2 (Bahrain)		Points

Key
Colour	Result
Gold	Winner
Silver	2nd place
Bronze	3rd place
Green	Other points position
Blue	Other classified position
Blue	Not classified, finished (NC)
Purple	Not classified, retired (Ret)
Red	Did not qualify (DNQ)
Red	Did not pre-qualify (DNPQ)
Black	Disqualified (DSQ)
White	Did not start (DNS)
White	Race cancelled (C)
Blank	Did not practice (DNP)
Blank	Excluded (EX)
Blank	Did not arrive (DNA)
Blank	Withdrawn (WD)
Text formatting	Meaning
**Bold**	Pole position point(s)
Italics	Fastest lap point(s)

Notes:

- † – Drivers did not finish the race, but were classified as they completed more than 90% of the race distance.
- ‡ – Half points were awarded for the sprint race, as less than 75% of the scheduled distance was completed.

=== Teams' championship ===
Pos.	Team	RBR1 (Austria)		RBR2 (Austria)		HUN (Hungary)		SIL1 (United Kingdom)		SIL2 (United Kingdom)		CAT (Spain)		SPA (Belgium)		MNZ (Italy)		MUG (Italy)		SOC^{‡} (Russia)		BHR1 (Bahrain)		BHR2 (Bahrain)		Points
Pos.	Team	FR	SR	FR	SR	FR	SR	FR	SR	FR	SR	FR	SR	FR	SR	FR	SR	FR	SR	FR	SR	FR	SR	FR	SR	Points
1	(Italy) Prema Racing	3	4	1	Ret	1	3	9	13	7	2^{F}	2	3	3	1^{F}	1	3^{F}	5	4	1	3	4	1	4	5	392
1	(Italy) Prema Racing	11	7	4	Ret	3	4	14	14	8	13	6	13	5^{F}	2	9	5	Ret	9	11	10	8	7	6^{F}	18	392
2	(United Kingdom) UNI-Virtuosi Racing	1^{F}	9	3	4	8^{P}	2	2^{F}	9	1^{P}	5	3	8	7	3	5	1	12	5	3	1	2^{P}	5	2	4	352.5
2	(United Kingdom) UNI-Virtuosi Racing	17^{P}	14	5	5	10	8^{F}	5	Ret	9^{F}	6	5^{P}	14	10	Ret	6^{P}	NC	Ret	6	8	7	14	16	5	10	352.5
3	(United Kingdom) Carlin	12	11	2^{P F}	9	6	7	3	4	6	1	4	4	1^{P}	9	4	6	10	7	2^{P}	6	3	15	1^{P}	1	272
3	(United Kingdom) Carlin	18	16	12	Ret	16	18	12	Ret	12	9	17	17	19	16	10	NC	16	19	5	11	6^{F}	Ret	7	2^{F}	272
4	(United Kingdom) Hitech Grand Prix	14	10	11	8	2^{F}	1	1	5	4	8	8	2	2	4	2^{F}	8	1	18	4	2^{F}	5	2	9	7	270
4	(United Kingdom) Hitech Grand Prix	DNS	Ret	14	10	4	5	17	19†	13	10	13	6	9	5	NC	15	2	Ret	7	5	12	Ret	16	9	270
5	(France) ART Grand Prix	2	5	6	1^{F}	Ret	9	4	2^{F}	2	14	11	11	15	7	3	2	6^{P}	1^{F}	9	13	7	4	11	12	201
5	(France) ART Grand Prix	4	Ret	7	3	Ret	13	16	10	14	21	Ret	15	17	Ret	14	18	9	11	Ret	14	19	6	21	14	201
6	(Netherlands) MP Motorsport	8	1^{F}	13	11	5	11	7^{P}	6	10	12	1^{F}	1	Ret	13	15	11	4	14	14	16	1	8	3	6	167
6	(Netherlands) MP Motorsport	9	6	17	13	12	16	10	7	11	18	7	5	DSQ	DNS	16	Ret	11	15	Ret	20	17	13	15	8	167
7	(Czech Republic) Charouz Racing System	7	2	18	12	7	6	6	3	5	4	10	7	4	6	8	4	3^{F}	2	17	9	11	3^{F}	10	11	137
7	(Czech Republic) Charouz Racing System	13	13	19	14	14	15	11	17	21	16	14	9	12	12	12	17	13	12	18	17	16	19†	12	13	137
8	(France) DAMS	5	3	8	2	9	12	8	1	15	7	9	10^{F}	6	10	7	9	7	3	10^{F}	8	9	12	8	3	115.5
8	(France) DAMS	Ret	Ret	10	7	17	NC	15	Ret	Ret	DNS	19†	DNS	11	11	11	DSQ	17	17	Ret	18	13	14	19	17	115.5
9	(Spain) Campos Racing	15	8	9	6	13	19	13	8	3	3	16	18	13	15	13	7	18	13	6	4	10	17†	14	19	48
9	(Spain) Campos Racing	16	15	20	17	15	21	21	15	20	19	18†	20	Ret	17	21	14	Ret	16	16	Ret	21	18†	22	Ret	48
10	(Germany) BWT HWA Racelab	6	18	21	15	11	10	18	11	16	11	12	16	16	8	17	12	8	20	12	12	18	10	13	20	13
10	(Germany) BWT HWA Racelab	Ret	Ret	DNS	16	Ret	14	19	18	19	20	Ret	19	18	14	18	16	Ret	Ret	15	Ret	22	Ret	18	21	13
11	(Italy) Trident	10	12	15	18	Ret	17	20	12	17	15	15	12	8	Ret	19	10	14	8	13	15	15	9	17	15	6
11	(Italy) Trident	Ret	17	16	Ret	Ret	20	Ret	16	18	17	Ret	21	14	Ret	20	13	15	10	Ret	19	20	11	20	16	6
Pos.	Team	FR	SR	FR	SR	FR	SR	FR	SR	FR	SR	FR	SR	FR	SR	FR	SR	FR	SR	FR	SR	FR	SR	FR	SR	Points
Pos.	Team	RBR1 (Austria)		RBR2 (Austria)		HUN (Hungary)		SIL1 (United Kingdom)		SIL2 (United Kingdom)		CAT (Spain)		SPA (Belgium)		MNZ (Italy)		MUG (Italy)		SOC (Russia)		BHR1 (Bahrain)		BHR2 (Bahrain)		Points

Key
Colour	Result
Gold	Winner
Silver	2nd place
Bronze	3rd place
Green	Other points position
Blue	Other classified position
Blue	Not classified, finished (NC)
Purple	Not classified, retired (Ret)
Red	Did not qualify (DNQ)
Red	Did not pre-qualify (DNPQ)
Black	Disqualified (DSQ)
White	Did not start (DNS)
White	Race cancelled (C)
Blank	Did not practice (DNP)
Blank	Excluded (EX)
Blank	Did not arrive (DNA)
Blank	Withdrawn (WD)
Text formatting	Meaning
**Bold**	Pole position point(s)
Italics	Fastest lap point(s)

Notes:

- † – Drivers did not finish the race, but were classified as they completed more than 90% of the race distance.
- ‡ – Half points were awarded for the sprint race, as less than 75% of the scheduled distance was completed.
