= 2020 Spielberg Formula 2 round =

(Austria) 2020 Red Bull Ring Formula 2 round
Round details
- Round 1 of 12 in the 2020 FIA Formula 2 Championship.
- Layout of the Red Bull Ring
- Location: Red Bull Ring; Spielberg, Styria, Austria
- Course: Permanent racing circuit 4.318 km (2.683 mi)

Feature race
- Date: 4 July 2020
- Laps: 40
Pole position
Driver	(China) Guanyu Zhou	UNI-Virtuosi
Time	1:14.416	
Podium
First	(United Kingdom) Callum Ilott	UNI-Virtuosi
Second	(New Zealand) Marcus Armstrong	ART Grand Prix
Third	(Russia) Robert Shwartzman	Prema Racing
Fastest lap
Driver	(United Kingdom) Callum Ilott	UNI-Virtuosi
- Time: 1:17.016 (on 27)

Sprint race
- Date: 5 July 2020
- Laps: 28
Podium
First	(Brazil) Felipe Drugovich	MP Motorsport
Second	(Switzerland) Louis Deletraz	Charouz Racing System
Third	(United Kingdom) Dan Ticktum	DAMS
Fastest lap
Driver	(Brazil) Felipe Drugovich	MP Motorsport
- Time: 1:17.277 (on 25)

The 2020 Red Bull Ring FIA Formula 2 round was a pair of motor races for Formula 2 cars that took place on 4 and 5 July 2020 at the Red Bull Ring in Spielberg, Austria, as part of the FIA Formula 2 Championship. It was the first round of the 2020 FIA Formula 2 Championship and ran in support of the 2020 Austrian Grand Prix.

== Classification ==
=== Qualifying ===
Pos.	No.	Driver	Team	Time	Gap	Grid
1	3	(China) Guanyu Zhou	UNI-Virtuosi	1:14.416		1
2	15	(Brazil) Felipe Drugovich	MP Motorsport	1:14.880	+0.464s	2
3	4	(United Kingdom) Callum Ilott	UNI-Virtuosi	1:14.884	+0.468s	3
4	6	(Denmark) Christian Lundgaard	ART Grand Prix	1:14.922	+0.506s	4
5	20	(Germany) Mick Schumacher	Prema Racing	1:14.952	+0.536s	5
6	8	(India) Jehan Daruvala	Carlin	1:15.028	+0.612s	6
7	25	(Italy) Luca Ghiotto	Hitech Grand Prix	1:15.044	+0.628s	7
8	21	(Russia) Robert Shwartzman	Prema Racing	1:15.051	+0.635s	8
9	2	(United Kingdom) Dan Ticktum	DAMS	1:15.128	+0.712s	9
10	11	(Switzerland) Louis Delétraz	Charouz Racing System	1:15.151	+0.735s	10
11	24	(Russia) Nikita Mazepin	Hitech Grand Prix	1:15.152	+0.736s	11
12	7	(Japan) Yuki Tsunoda	Carlin	1:15.157	+0.741s	12
13	5	(New Zealand) Marcus Armstrong	ART Grand Prix	1:15.208	+0.792s	13
14	9	(United Kingdom) Jack Aitken	Campos Racing	1:15.264	+0.848s	14
15	12	(Brazil) Pedro Piquet	Charouz Racing System	1:15.376	+0.960s	15
16	22	(Israel) Roy Nissany	Trident	1:15.457	+1.041s	16
17	1	(Indonesia) Sean Gelael	DAMS	1:15.604	+1.188s	17
18	17	(France) Giuliano Alesi	BWT HWA Racelab	1:15.688	+1.272s	18
19	10	(Brazil) Guilherme Samaia	Campos Racing	1:15.703	+1.287s	19
20	16	(Russia) Artem Markelov	BWT HWA Racelab	1:15.746	+1.330s	20
21	14	(Japan) Nobuharu Matsushita	MP Motorsport	1:15.897	+1.481s	21
22	23	(Japan) Marino Sato	Trident	1:16.011	+1.595s	22

=== Feature race ===
Pos.	No.	Driver	Team	Laps	Time/retired	Grid	Points
1	4	(United Kingdom) Callum Ilott	UNI-Virtuosi	40	54:21.050	3	25 (2)
2	5	(New Zealand) Marcus Armstrong	ART Grand Prix	40	+8.856	13	18
3	21	(Russia) Robert Shwartzman	Prema Racing	40	+9.291	8	15
4	6	(Denmark) Christian Lundgaard	ART Grand Prix	40	+10.878	4	12
5	2	(United Kingdom) Dan Ticktum	DAMS	40	+11.277	9	10
6	17	(France) Giuliano Alesi	BWT HWA Racelab	40	+12.828	18	8
7	11	(Switzerland) Louis Delétraz	Charouz Racing System	40	+16.267	10	6
8	15	(Brazil) Felipe Drugovich	MP Motorsport	40	+17.033	2	4
9	14	(Japan) Nobuharu Matsushita	MP Motorsport	40	+17.435	21	2
10	22	(Israel) Roy Nissany	Trident	40	+19.543	16	1
11	20	(Germany) Mick Schumacher	Prema Racing	40	+20.049	5	
12	8	(India) Jehan Daruvala	Carlin	40	+22.008	6	
13	12	(Brazil) Pedro Piquet	Charouz Racing System	40	+24.996	15	
14	24	(Russia) Nikita Mazepin	Hitech Grand Prix	40	+25.885	11	
15	9	(United Kingdom) Jack Aitken	Campos Racing	40	+30.138	15	
16	10	(Brazil) Guilherme Samaia	Campos Racing	40	+53.934	19	
17	3	(China) Guanyu Zhou	UNI-Virtuosi	39	+1 lap	1	(4)
18	7	(Japan) Yuki Tsunoda	Carlin	39	+1 lap	12	
DNF	16	(Russia) Artem Markelov	BWT HWA Racelab	26	Mechanical	20	
DNF	1	(Indonesia) Sean Gelael	DAMS	16	Mechanical	17	
DNF	23	(Japan) Marino Sato	Trident	2	Mechanical	22	
DNS	25	(Italy) Luca Ghiotto	Hitech Grand Prix		Did not start^{1}		
Fastest lap: (United Kingdom) Callum Ilott (UNI-Virtuosi) — 1:17.016 (on lap 37)

Notes:

- ^1 – Luca Ghiotto could not start the race after suffering a mechanical issue on the sighting lap. His grid slot was then left vacant.

=== Sprint race ===
Pos.	No.	Driver	Team	Laps	Time/retired	Grid	Points
1	15	(Brazil) Felipe Drugovich	MP Motorsport	28	42:05.526	1	15 (2)
2	11	(Switzerland) Louis Delétraz	Charouz Racing System	28	+2.469	2	12
3	2	(United Kingdom) Dan Ticktum	DAMS	28	+2.790	4	10
4	21	(Russia) Robert Shwartzman	Prema Racing	28	+3.330	6	8
5	6	(Denmark) Christian Lundgaard	ART Grand Prix	28	+5.396	5	6
6	14	(Japan) Nobuharu Matsushita	MP Motorsport	28	+9.177	9	4
7	20	(Germany) Mick Schumacher	Prema Racing	28	+9.741	11	2
8	9	(United Kingdom) Jack Aitken	Campos Racing	28	+14.041	15	1
9	4	(United Kingdom) Callum Ilott	UNI-Virtuosi	28	+14.272	8	
10	24	(Russia) Nikita Mazepin	Hitech Grand Prix	28	+15.395	14	
11	7	(Japan) Yuki Tsunoda	Carlin	28	+17.528	18	
12	22	(Israel) Roy Nissany	Trident	28	+18.471	10	
13	12	(Brazil) Pedro Piquet	Charouz Racing System	28	+19.118	13	
14	3	(China) Guanyu Zhou	UNI-Virtuosi	28	+19.668	17	
15	10	(Brazil) Guilherme Samaia	Campos Racing	28	+22.082	16	
16	8	(India) Jehan Daruvala	Carlin	28	+24.290	12	
17	23	(Japan) Marino Sato	Trident	28	+24.909	21	
18	16	(Russia) Artem Markelov	BWT HWA Racelab	27	+1 lap	19	
DNF	5	(New Zealand) Marcus Armstrong	ART Grand Prix	13	Mechanical	7	
DNF	25	(Italy) Luca Ghiotto	Hitech Grand Prix	7	Collision	22	
DNF	1	(Indonesia) Sean Gelael	DAMS	3	Mechanical	20	
DNF	17	(France) Giuliano Alesi	BWT HWA Racelab	1	Engine	3	
Fastest lap: (Brazil) Felipe Drugovich (MP Motorsport) — 1:17.277 (on lap 25)

== Championship standings after the event ==
Drivers' Championship standings

Pos	Driver	Points
1	(United Kingdom) Callum Ilott	27
2	(Russia) Robert Shwartzman	23
3	(Brazil) Felipe Drugovich	21
4	(United Kingdom) Dan Ticktum	20
5	(Switzerland) Louis Delétraz	18

Teams' Championship standings

Pos	Team	Points
1	(France) ART Grand Prix	36
2	(United Kingdom) UNI-Virtuosi Racing	31
3	(Netherlands) MP Motorsport	27
4	(Italy) Prema Racing	25
5	(France) DAMS	20

- Note: Only the top five positions are included for both sets of standings.

== See also ==
- 2020 Austrian Grand Prix
- 2020 Spielberg Formula 3 round

Previous round: 2019 Yas Island Formula 2 round	FIA Formula 2 Championship; 2020 season	Next round: 2020 2nd Spielberg Formula 2 round
Previous round: 2019 Spielberg Formula 2 round	Spielberg Formula 2 round	Next round: 2020 2nd Spielberg Formula 2 round
