= 2020 Budapest Formula 2 round =

(Hungary) 2020 Hungaroring Formula 2 round
Round details
- Round 3 of 12 in the 2020 FIA Formula 2 Championship.
- Layout of the Hungaroring
- Location: Hungaroring; Mogyoród, Hungary
- Course: Permanent racing circuit 4.381 km (2.722 mi)

Feature race
- Date: 18 July 2020
- Laps: 37
Pole position
Driver	(United Kingdom) Callum Ilott	UNI-Virtuosi
Time	1:50.767	
Podium
First	(Russia) Robert Shwartzman	Prema Racing
Second	(Russia) Nikita Mazepin	Hitech Grand Prix
Third	(Germany) Mick Schumacher	Prema Racing
Fastest lap
Driver	(Russia) Nikita Mazepin	Hitech Grand Prix
- Time: 1:31.717 (on lap 34)

Sprint race
- Date: 19 July 2020
- Laps: 28
Podium
First	(Italy) Luca Ghiotto	Hitech Grand Prix
Second	(United Kingdom) Callum Ilott	UNI-Virtuosi
Third	(Germany) Mick Schumacher	Prema Racing
Fastest lap
Driver	(China) Guanyu Zhou	UNI-Virtuosi
- Time: 1:30.969 (on lap 22)

The 2020 Hungaroring FIA Formula 2 round was a pair of motor races involving Formula 2 cars on 18 and 19 July 2020 at the Hungaroring in Mogyoród, Hungary. The event was the third round of the 2020 FIA Formula 2 Championship and ran in support of the 2020 Hungarian Grand Prix.

== Classification ==
=== Qualifying ===
Pos.	No.	Driver	Team	Time	Gap	Grid
1	4	(United Kingdom) Callum Ilott	UNI-Virtuosi	1:50.767		1
2	25	(Italy) Luca Ghiotto	Hitech Grand Prix	1:51.075	+0.308	2
3	3	(China) Guanyu Zhou	UNI-Virtuosi	1:51.290	+0.523	3
4	2	(United Kingdom) Dan Ticktum	DAMS	1:51.379	+0.612	4
5	20	(Germany) Mick Schumacher	Prema Racing	1:51.584	+0.817	5
6	6	(Denmark) Christian Lundgaard	ART Grand Prix	1:51.729	+0.962	6
7	5	(New Zealand) Marcus Armstrong	ART Grand Prix	1:51.962	+1.195	7
8	9	(United Kingdom) Jack Aitken	Campos Racing	1:52.496	+1.729	8
9	1	(Indonesia) Sean Gelael	DAMS	1:52.500	+1.733	9
10	17	(France) Giuliano Alesi	BWT HWA Racelab	1:52.567	+1.800	10
11	21	(Russia) Robert Shwartzman	Prema Racing	1:52.715	+1.948	11
12	11	(Switzerland) Louis Delétraz	Charouz Racing System	1:52.729	+1.962	12
13	12	(Brazil) Pedro Piquet	Charouz Racing System	1:52.870	+2.103	13
14	7	(Japan) Yuki Tsunoda	Carlin	1:53.215	+2.448	14
15	8	(India) Jehan Daruvala	Carlin	1:53.288	+2.521	15
16	24	(Russia) Nikita Mazepin	Hitech Grand Prix	1:53.462	+2.695	16
17	16	(Russia) Artem Markelov	BWT HWA Racelab	1:53.569	+2.802	17
18	15	(Brazil) Felipe Drugovich	MP Motorsport	1:53.583	+2.816	18
19	23	(Japan) Marino Sato	Trident	1:53.658	+2.891	20^{1}
20	22	(Israel) Roy Nissany	Trident	1:54.736	+3.969	21^{1}
21	14	(Japan) Nobuharu Matsushita	MP Motorsport	1:55.869	+5.102	19
NC	10	(Brazil) Guilherme Samaia	Campos Racing	No time		22

Notes

- ^1 - Marino Sato and Roy Nissany received a one-place grid penalty for a tyre usage infraction.

=== Feature Race ===
Pos.	No.	Driver	Entrant	Laps	Time/Retired	Grid	Points
1	21	(Russia) Robert Shwartzman	Prema Racing	37	1:01:36.211	11	25
2	24	(Russia) Nikita Mazepin	Hitech Grand Prix	37	+15.599	16	18 (2)
3	20	(Germany) Mick Schumacher	Prema Racing	37	+23.051	5	15
4	25	(Italy) Luca Ghiotto	Hitech Grand Prix	37	+32.775	2	12
5	15	(Brazil) Felipe Drugovich	MP Motorsport	37	+36.241	18	10
6	8	(India) Jehan Daruvala	Carlin	37	+40.104	15	8
7	11	(Switzerland) Louis Delétraz	Charouz Racing System	37	+46.191	12	6
8	4	(United Kingdom) Callum Ilott	UNI-Virtuosi	37	+48.780	1	4 (4)
9	2	(United Kingdom) Dan Ticktum	DAMS	37	+49.652	4	2
10	3	(China) Guanyu Zhou	UNI-Virtuosi	37	+52.176	3	1
11	17	(France) Giuliano Alesi	BWT HWA Racelab	37	+1:01.789	10	
12	14	(Japan) Nobuharu Matsushita	MP Motorsport	37	+1:21.317	19	
13	9	(United Kingdom) Jack Aitken	Campos Racing	37	+1:31.744	8	
14	12	(Brazil) Pedro Piquet	Charouz Racing System	37	+1:45.786	13	
15	10	(Brazil) Guilherme Samaia	Campos Racing	36	+1 lap	22	
16	7	(Japan) Yuki Tsunoda	Carlin	36	+1 lap	14	
17	1	(Indonesia) Sean Gelael	DAMS	36	+1 lap	9	
DNF	6	(Denmark) Christian Lundgaard	ART Grand Prix	10	Collision damage	6	
DNF	5	(New Zealand) Marcus Armstrong	ART Grand Prix	5	Collision damage	7	
DNF	16	(Russia) Artem Markelov	BWT HWA Racelab	3	Collision	17	
DNF	23	(Japan) Marino Sato	Trident	1	Collision	20	
DNF	22	(Israel) Roy Nissany	Trident	1	Collision	21	
Fastest lap: (Russia) Nikita Mazepin (Hitech Grand Prix) — 1:31.717 (on lap 34)

=== Sprint race ===
Pos.	No.	Driver	Entrant	Laps	Time/Retired	Grid	Points
1	25	(Italy) Luca Ghiotto	Hitech Grand Prix	28	45:04.725	5	15
2	4	(United Kingdom) Callum Ilott	UNI-Virtuosi	28	+0.423	1	12
3	20	(Germany) Mick Schumacher	Prema Racing	28	+11.762	6	10
4	21	(Russia) Robert Shwartzman	Prema Racing	28	+13.818	8	8
5	24	(Russia) Nikita Mazepin	Hitech Grand Prix	28	+15.152	7	6
6	11	(Switzerland) Louis Delétraz	Charouz Racing System	28	+23.451	2	4
7	8	(India) Jehan Daruvala	Carlin	28	+23.831	3	2
8	3	(China) Guanyu Zhou	UNI-Virtuosi	28	+32.230	10	1 (2)
9	5	(New Zealand) Marcus Armstrong	ART Grand Prix	28	+34.275	19	
10	17	(France) Giuliano Alesi	BWT HWA Racelab	28	+39.283	11	
11	14	(Japan) Nobuharu Matsushita	MP Motorsport	28	+42.731	12	
12	1	(Indonesia) Sean Gelael	DAMS	28	+44.953	17	
13	6	(Denmark) Christian Lundgaard	ART Grand Prix	28	+46.926	18	
14	16	(Russia) Artem Markelov	BWT HWA Racelab	28	+51.733	20	
15	12	(Brazil) Pedro Piquet	Charouz Racing System	28	+52.231	14	
16	15	(Brazil) Felipe Drugovich	MP Motorsport	28	+55.890	4	
17	22	(Israel) Roy Nissany	Trident	28	+1:04.365	22	
18	7	(Japan) Yuki Tsunoda	Carlin	28	+1:13.806	16	
19	9	(United Kingdom) Jack Aitken	Campos Racing	28	+1:15.656	13	
20	23	(Japan) Marino Sato	Trident	28	+1:23.059	21	
21	10	(Brazil) Guilherme Samaia	Campos Racing	27	+1 lap	15	
DNF	2	(United Kingdom) Dan Ticktum	DAMS	23	Engine	9	
Fastest lap: (China) Guanyu Zhou (UNI-Virtuosi) — 1:30.969 (on lap 22)

== Standings after the event ==
Drivers' Championship standings

	Pos.	Driver	Points
	1	(Russia) Robert Shwartzman	81
1	2	(United Kingdom) Callum Ilott	63
1	3	(Denmark) Christian Lundgaard	43
6	4	(Germany) Mick Schumacher	39
1	5	(United Kingdom) Dan Ticktum	38

Teams' Championship standings

	Pos.	Team	Points
2	1	(Italy) Prema Racing	120
	2	(United Kingdom) UNI-Virtuosi Racing	94
2	3	(France) ART Grand Prix	77
6	4	(United Kingdom) Hitech Grand Prix	54
1	5	(France) DAMS	41

- Note: Only the top five positions are included for both sets of standings.

== See also ==
- 2020 Hungarian Grand Prix
- 2020 Budapest Formula 3 round

Previous round: 2020 2nd Spielberg Formula 2 round	FIA Formula 2 Championship; 2020 season	Next round: 2020 Silverstone Formula 2 round
Previous round: 2019 Budapest Formula 2 round	Budapest Formula 2 round	Next round: 2022 Budapest Formula 2 round
