= 2017 Taupo TRS round =

Race details
Date	4-5 February 2017
Official name	Taupo TRS round
Location	Bruce McLaren Motorsport Park, Taupō
Course	Permanent road course 3.5 km (2.2 mi)
- Overall results

Podium
First	(New Zealand) Marcus Armstrong	M2 Competition
Second	(India) Jehan Daruvala	M2 Competition
Third	(Australia) Thomas Randle	Victory Motor Racing

The 2017 Taupo TRS round was the fourth round of the 2017 Toyota Racing Series. The event was held at the Bruce McLaren Motorsport Park, in Taupō, New Zealand from 4 to 5 February 2017.

== Report ==
=== Practice ===
Thomas Randle continued his front-running form by achieving the fastest time in four out of the five practice sessions during the weekend. The only other driver to top the timesheets during practice was Marcus Armstrong, who went fastest in Practice Four.

Session	Day	Fastest lap			
Session	Day	No.	Driver	Team	Time
Practice 1	Thursday	49	(Australia) Thomas Randle	Victory Motor Racing	1:24.179
Practice 2	Thursday	49	(Australia) Thomas Randle	Victory Motor Racing	1:23.699
Practice 3	Friday	49	(Australia) Thomas Randle	Victory Motor Racing	1:23.524
Practice 4	Friday	8	(New Zealand) Marcus Armstrong	M2 Competition	1:23.180
Practice 5	Friday	49	(Australia) Thomas Randle	Victory Motor Racing	1:22.994

=== Race 1 ===
==== Qualifying ====
Armstrong grabbed his first Toyota Racing Series pole position with a time of 1:23.383, with Jehan Daruvala in second and Brendon Leitch in third.

Pos	No	Driver	Team	Lap	Grid
1	8	(New Zealand) Marcus Armstrong	M2 Competition	1:23.383	1
2	9	(India) Jehan Daruvala	M2 Competition	1:23.436	2
3	3	(New Zealand) Brendon Leitch	Victory Motor Racing	1:23.536	3
4	5	(Brazil) Pedro Piquet	M2 Competition	1:23.543	4
5	49	(Australia) Thomas Randle	Victory Motor Racing	1:23.549	5
6	83	(Canada) Kami Laliberté	M2 Competition	1:23.660	6
7	22	(Netherlands) Richard Verschoor	Giles Motorsport	1:23.718	7
8	65	(United Kingdom) Enaam Ahmed	Giles Motorsport	1:23.928	8
9	62	(Austria) Ferdinand Habsburg	M2 Competition	1:23.989	9
10	26	(Australia) Harry Hayek	Giles Motorsport	1:24.001	10
11	10	(France) Thomas Neubauer	MTEC Motorsport	1:24.029	11
12	11	(New Zealand) Taylor Cockerton	MTEC Motorsport	1:24.087	12
13	33	(United States) Kory Enders	MTEC Motorsport	1:24.131	13
14	96	(Australia) Luis Leeds	Giles Motorsport	1:24.306	14
15	47	(Germany) Keyvan Andres Soori	Giles Motorsport	1:24.526	15
16	51	(United States) Shelby Blackstock	Victory Motor Racing	1:24.669	16
17	80	(Russia) Nikita Lastochkin	Victory Motor Racing	1:24.886	17
18	12	(Brazil) Christian Hahn	Giles Motorsport	1:24.900	18
19	24	(India) Ameya Vaidyanathan	MTEC Motorsport	1:25.198	19
20	27	(France) Jean Baptiste Simmenauer	M2 Competition	1:25.396	20

==== Race ====
A strong start followed by fast, consistent race pace meant that Leitch would grab his first race win of the year. Armstrong finished second and Daruvala third.

Pos	No	Driver	Team	Laps	Time / Retired	Grid
1	3	(New Zealand) Brendon Leitch	Victory Motor Racing	15	21min 16.000sec	3
2	8	(New Zealand) Marcus Armstrong	M2 Competition	15	+ 1.536 s	1
3	9	(India) Jehan Daruvala	M2 Competition	15	+ 3.763 s	2
4	49	(Australia) Thomas Randle	Victory Motor Racing	15	+ 3.860 s	5
5	5	(Brazil) Pedro Piquet	M2 Competition	15	+ 6.334 s	4
6	83	(Canada) Kami Laliberté	M2 Competition	15	+ 9.783 s	6
7	65	(United Kingdom) Enaam Ahmed	Giles Motorsport	15	+ 10.915 s	8
8	22	(Netherlands) Richard Verschoor	Giles Motorsport	15	+ 11.564 s	7
9	96	(Australia) Luis Leeds	Giles Motorsport	15	+ 18.441 s	14
10	47	(Germany) Keyvan Andres Soori	Giles Motorsport	15	+ 20.975 s	15
11	10	(France) Thomas Neubauer	MTEC Motorsport	15	+ 21.807 s	11
12	24	(India) Ameya Vaidyantahan	MTEC Motorsport	15	+ 22.180 s	19
13	26	(Australia) Harry Hayek	Giles Motorsport	15	+ 23.595 s	10
14	51	(United States) Shelby Blackstock	Victory Motor Racing	15	+ 24.091 s	16
15	12	(Brazil) Christian Hahn	Giles Motorsport	15	+ 24.966 s	18
16	80	(Russia) Nikita Lastochkin	Victory Motor Racing	15	+ 25.946 s	17
17	27	(France) Jean Baptiste Simmenauer	M2 Competition	15	+ 35.675 s	20
Ret	62	(Austria) Ferdinand Habsburg	M2 Competition	0	Accident	9
Ret	11	(New Zealand) Taylor Cockerton	MTEC Motorsport	0	Accident	12
Ret	33	(United States) Kory Enders	MTEC Motorsport	0	Accident	13
Fastest Lap: Brendon Leitch (Victory Motor Racing) – 1:24.315

=== Race 2 ===
Pedro Piquet held off a rampant Thomas Randle to take his second win of the year, with Daruvala in third.

Pos	No	Driver	Team	Laps	Time / Retired	Grid
1	5	(Brazil) Pedro Piquet	M2 Competition	15	23min 01.308sec	3
2	49	(Australia) Thomas Randle	Victory Motor Racing	15	+ 0.563 s	1
3	9	(India) Jehan Daruvala	M2 Competition	15	+ 1.269 s	1
4	8	(New Zealand) Marcus Armstrong	M2 Competition	15	+ 2.565 s	1
5	3	(New Zealand) Brendon Leitch	Victory Motor Racing	15	+ 2.884 s	1
6	22	(Netherlands) Richard Verschoor	Giles Motorsport	15	+ 4.712 s	1
7	65	(United Kingdom) Enaam Ahmed	Giles Motorsport	15	+ 5.007 s	1
8	96	(Australia) Luis Leeds	Giles Motorsport	15	+ 8.029 s	1
9	10	(France) Thomas Neubauer	MTEC Motorsport	15	+ 9.306 s	1
10	47	(Germany) Keyvan Andres Soori	Giles Motorsport	15	+ 9.454 s	1
11	83	(Canada) Kami Laliberté	M2 Competition	15	+ 11.169 s	1
12	12	(Brazil) Christian Hahn	Giles Motorsport	15	+ 11.585 s	1
13	80	(Russia) Nikita Lastochkin	Victory Motor Racing	15	+ 12.360 s	1
14	51	(United States) Shelby Blackstock	Victory Motor Racing	15	+ 12.837 s	1
15	11	(New Zealand) Taylor Cockerton	MTEC Motorsport	15	+ 13.208 s	1
16	62	(Austria) Ferdinand Habsburg	M2 Competition	15	+ 58.379 s	1
17	24	(India) Ameya Vaidyanathan	MTEC Motorsport	12	+ 3 laps	1
Ret	26	(Australia) Harry Hayek	Giles Motorsport	11	Retired	1
Ret	33	(United States) Kory Enders	MTEC Motorsport	1	Retired	1
Ret	27	(France) Jean Baptiste Simmenauer	M2 Competition	1	Retired	1
Fastest Lap: Taylor Cockerton (MTEC Motorsport) – 1:24.290

=== Race 3 ===
==== Race ====
Pos	No	Driver	Team	Laps	Time / Retired	Grid
1	8	(New Zealand) Marcus Armstrong	M2 Competition	20	29min 57.431sec	3
2	9	(India) Jehan Daruvala	M2 Competition	20	+ 6.723 s	1
3	62	(Austria) Ferdinand Habsburg	M2 Competition	20	+ 16.654 s	1
4	49	(Australia) Thomas Randle	Victory Motor Racing	20	+ 16.797 s	1
5	5	(Brazil) Pedro Piquet	M2 Competition	20	+ 17.777 s	1
6	11	(New Zealand) Taylor Cockerton	MTEC Motorsport	20	+ 19.464 s	1
7	22	(Netherlands) Richard Verschoor	Giles Motorsport	20	+ 23.726 s	1
8	3	(New Zealand) Brendon Leitch	Victory Motor Racing	20	+ 23.922 s	1
9	83	(Canada) Kami Laliberté	M2 Competition	20	+ 24.791 s	1
10	26	(Australia) Harry Hayek	Giles Motorsport	20	+ 26.221 s	1
11	65	(United Kingdom) Enaam Ahmed	Giles Motorsport	20	+ 27.202 s	1
12	96	(Australia) Luis Leeds	Giles Motorsport	20	+ 29.093 s	1
13	47	(Germany) Keyvan Andres Soori	Giles Motorsport	20	+ 31.336 s	1
14	24	(India) Ameya Vaidyanathan	MTEC Motorsport	20	+ 31.692 s	1
15	12	(Brazil) Christian Hahn	Giles Motorsport	20	+ 33.271 s	1
16	80	(Russia) Nikita Lastochkin	Victory Motor Racing	20	+ 33.693 s	1
17	51	(United States) Shelby Blackstock	Victory Motor Racing	20	+ 34.063 s	1
18	10	(France) Thomas Neubauer	MTEC Motorsport	20	+ 34.678 s	1
19	27	(France) Jean Baptiste Simmenauer	M2 Competition	20	+ 48.265 s	1
Ret	33	(United States) Kory Enders	MTEC Motorsport	0	Retired	1
Fastest Lap: Jehan Daruvala (M2 Competition) – 1:24.590

Preceded by 2017 Hampton Downs TRS round	Toyota Racing Series; 2017	Succeeded by 2017 New Zealand Grand Prix
