= 2014 CIK-FIA Karting Academy Trophy =

International karting championship

The 2014 CIK-FIA Karting Academy Trophy was the 5th season of the CIK-FIA Karting Academy Trophy, an international karting championship. Richard Verschoor clinched the title in the final race ahead of Kakunoshin Ohta and Rinus van Kalmthout.

== Standings ==
Heat qualifying points

Points are awarded to the top 10.

Position	1st	2nd	3rd	4th	5th	6th	7th	8th	9th	10th
Points	10	9	8	7	6	5	4	3	2	1

Feature race points

Points are awarded to the top fifteen.

Position	1st	2nd	3rd	4th	5th	6th	7th	8th	9th	10th	11th	12th	13th	14th	15th
Points	25	18	16	13	11	10	9	8	7	6	5	4	3	2	1

Championship top 10

Pos.	Driver	BEL QH (Belgium)	BEL FR (Belgium)	DEU QH (Germany)	DEU FR (Germany)	ITA QH (Italy)	ITA FR (Italy)	Points
1	(Netherlands) Richard Verschoor	1	(13)	(7)	2	2	1	64(71)
2	(Japan) Kakunoshin Ohta	10+	1	2	3	10+	11	50(55)
3	(Netherlands) Rinus van Kalmthout	2	2	3	5	10+	10	48(54)
4	(Turkey) Berkay Besler	3	4	(5)	(4)	1	3	47(66)
5	(France) Alexandre Vromant	10+	10	10+	1	10+	15+	31
6	(Spain) Xavier Lloveras	7	15+	(8)	14	7	2	30(33)
7	(United Kingdom) Ross Martin	10+	2	10+	(10)	5	8	30(36)
8	(Switzerland) Lucas Légeret	10	(8)	10+	7	6	7	24(34)
9	(Germany) Max Hesse	10+	15+	10+	6	10+	4	23
10	(United Kingdom) Oliver York	6	15+	10+	9	10+	5	23
