= Benschop, Utrecht =

Benschop
- Village
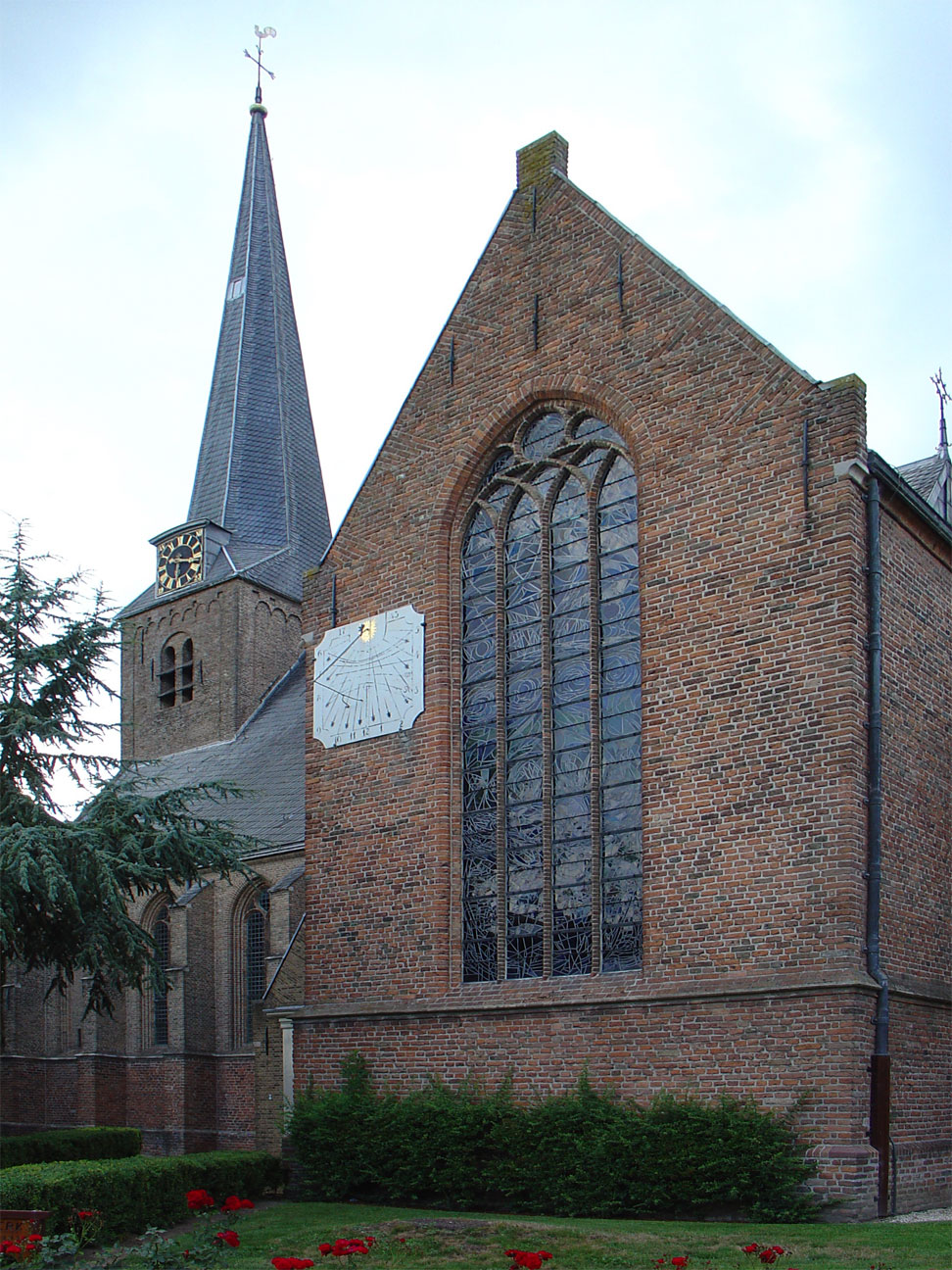
- De Nicolaaskerk van Benschop

- Location in the Netherlands Benschop (Netherlands)
- Coordinates: 52°0′26″N 4°58′46″E
- Country: Netherlands
- Province: Utrecht
- Municipality: Lopik

Area
  - Total: 22.97 km^{2} (8.87 sq mi)
- Elevation: −0.4 m (−1.3 ft)

Population (2021)
  - Total: 3,575
  - Density: 155.6/km^{2} (403.1/sq mi)
- Time zone: UTC+1 (CET)
  - Summer (DST): UTC+2 (CEST)
- Postal code: 3405
- Dialing code: 0348

Benschop is a village in the Dutch province of Utrecht. It is a part of the municipality of Lopik, and lies about 4 km west of IJsselstein. Benschop is an extremely long village: apart from a relatively compact town centre, it consists of a long ribbon (over 8 km long) of houses (mainly farms) on both sides of the Benschopsche Wetering. Until 1989, Benschop was a separate municipality.

== History ==
The village was first mentioned between 1280 and 1287 as benscop, and means "(peat) concession of Ben (person)". Excavation of the peat started in the 11th and 12th century. Benschop used to be part of the Prince-Bishopric of Utrecht. In 1285, the village became part of Holland.

The Dutch Reformed Church dates from around 1500, but has 13th century elements. Huis Snellenburg was a manor house built around 1700. It was redeveloped into a farm, however the interior and the carriage house remain. In 1805, Benschop was returned to Utrecht. In 1840, it was home to 1,415 people. Benschop used to be an independent municipality. In 1989, it was merged into Lopik.

== Notable people ==
- Richard Verschoor (born 2000), racing driver

== Gallery ==
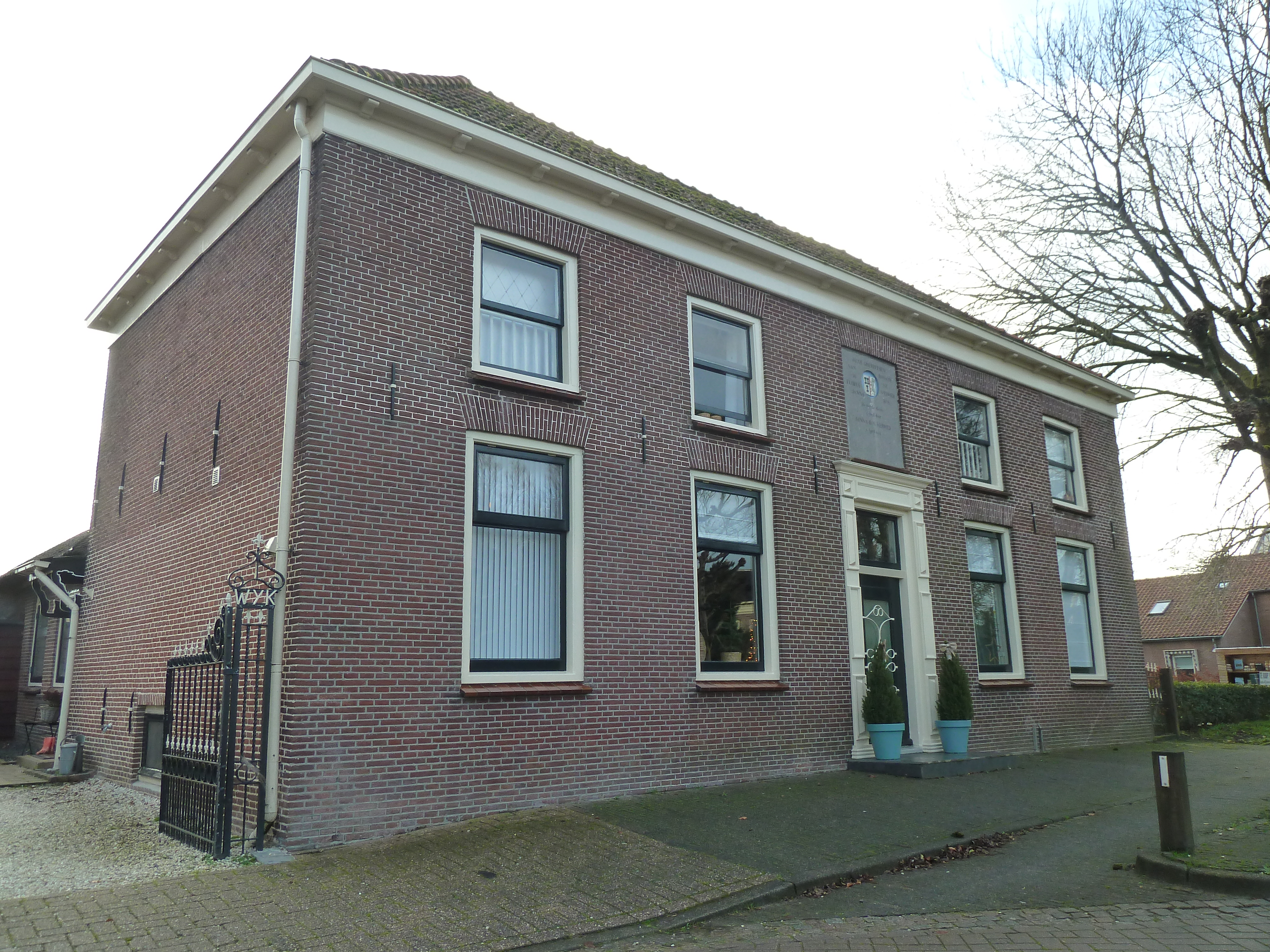
House in Benschop

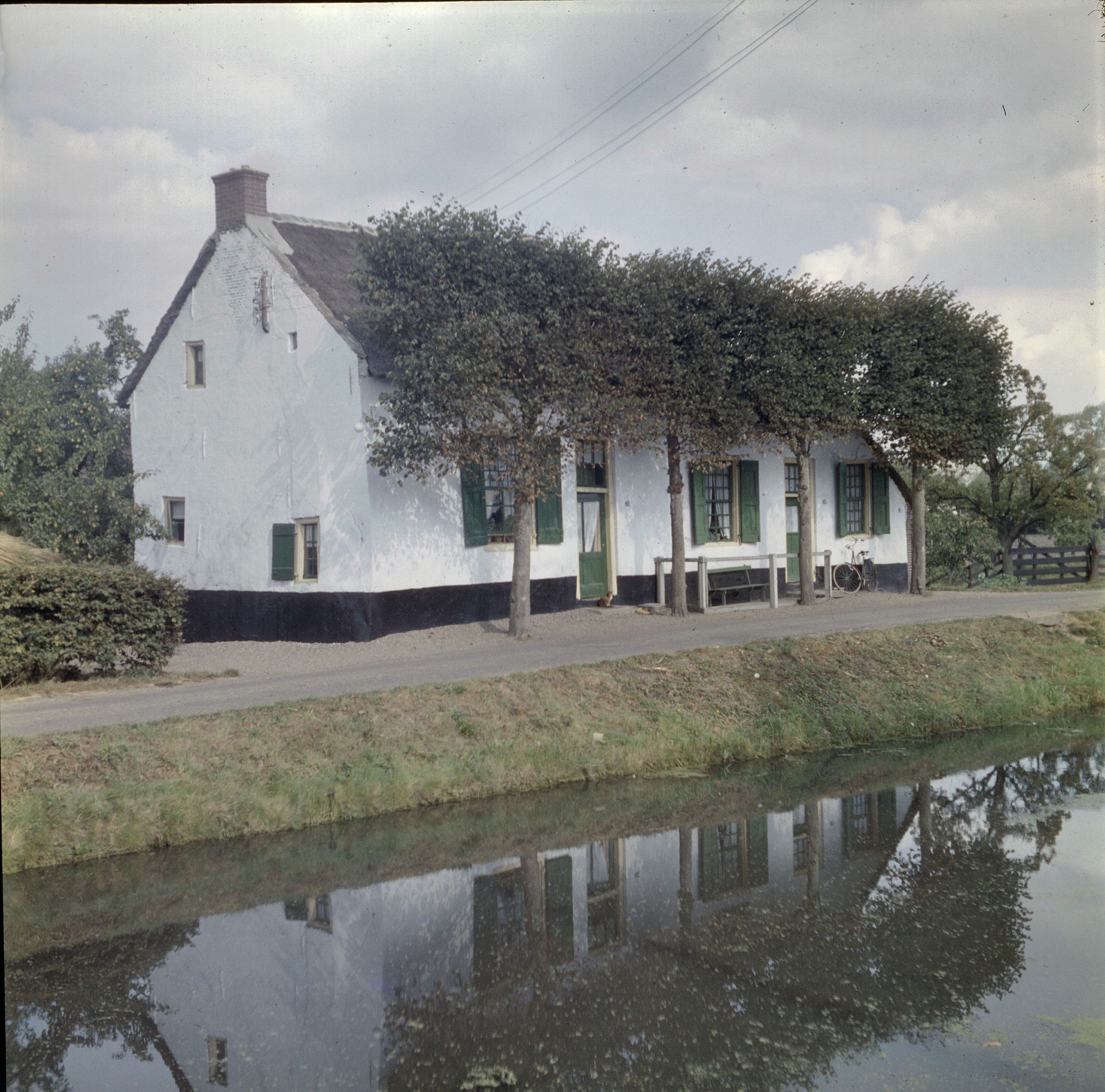
Farm in Benschop

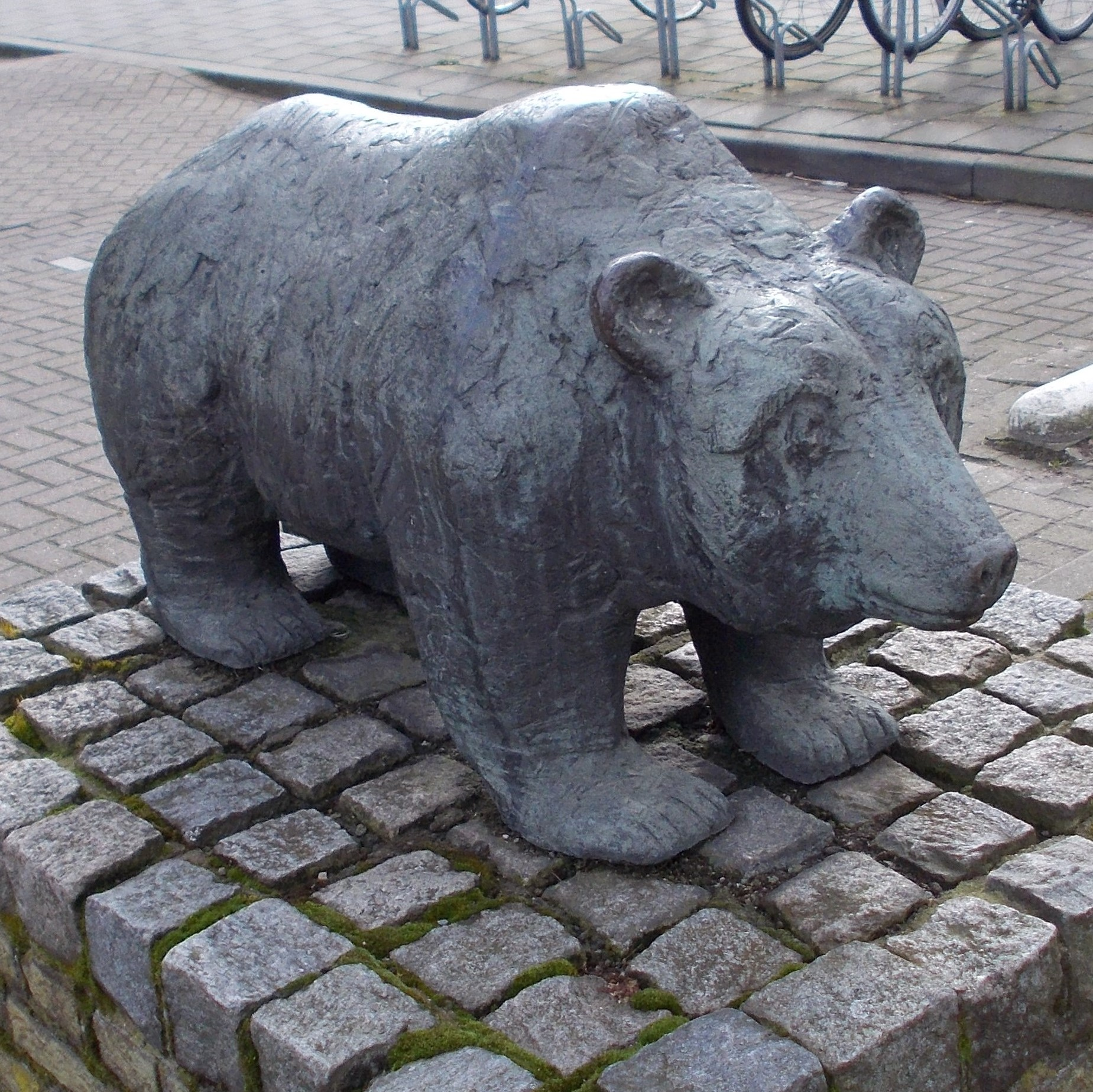
The bear of Benschop by Inez van Dijk

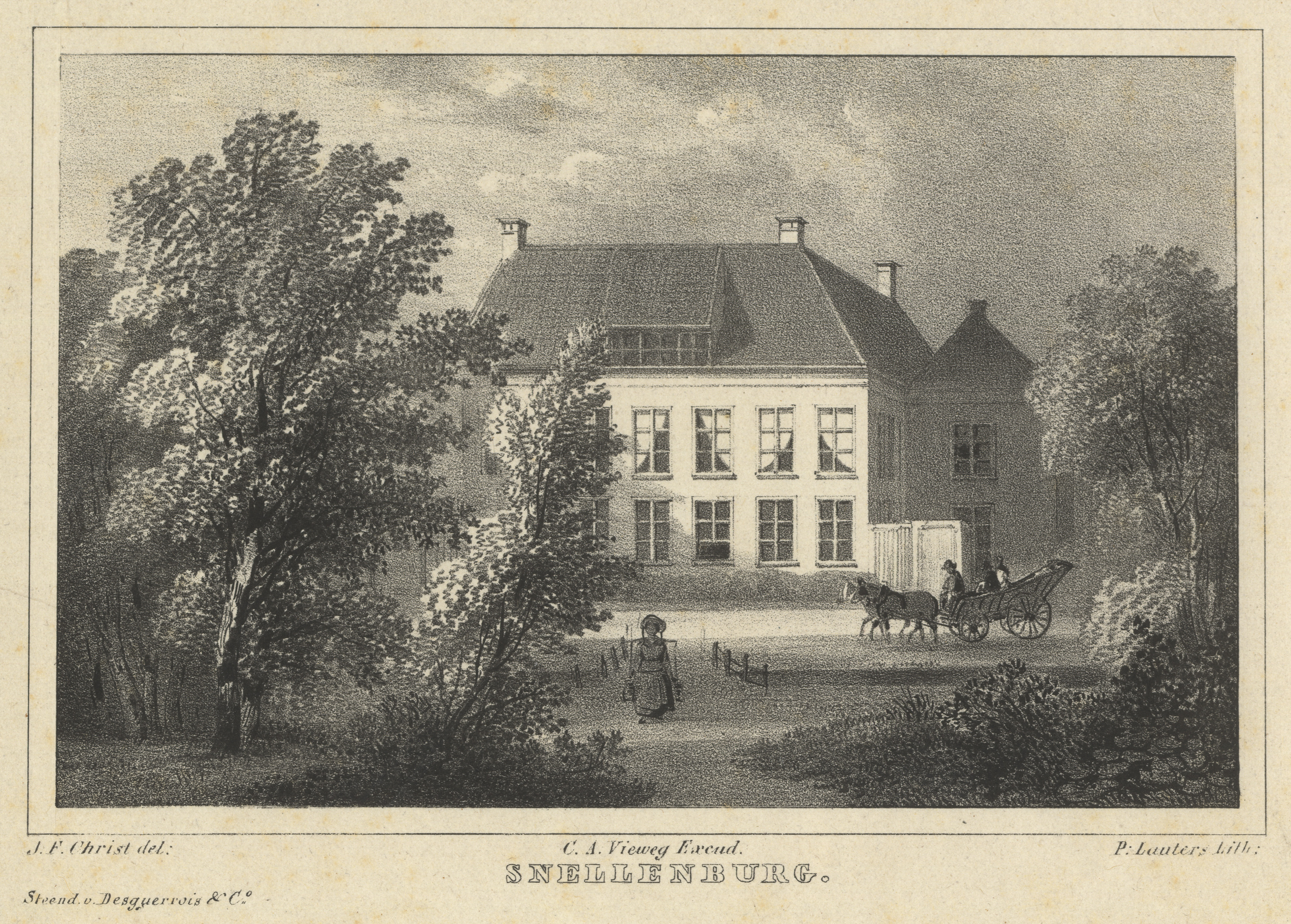
Huis Snellenburg (1839)
