= 2016 SMP F4 Championship =

Motor racing competition

The 2016 SMP F4 Championship season is the second season of the SMP F4 Championship. It began on 29 April at Sochi and finished on 10 September at Ahvenisto after 20 races held across seven rounds.

This season saw the F4 debut of the Dutch team MP Motorsport, which joined Koiranen GP and SMP Racing in fielding cars and drivers. The series also expanded to the Netherlands, hosting some races as well as a parallel championship to the SMP F4 championship, called the Dutch F4 Trophy.

The series is a FIA North-European Zone (NEZ) championship as in 2015. NEZ Council agreed in its meeting in 20 March to allow KNAF licence holders to score points in the championship. The FIA World Motor Sport Council (WMSC) had already accepted KNAF into the NEZ F4 championship earlier in 4 March. The exception is valid for 2016 season only, and only after NEZ receives full payment of membership fees. Dutch drivers aren't eligible to any other NEZ cups or championships. Spanish Xavier Lloveras scored points in the series as he was an AKK Motorsports (FIN) license holder. Richard Verschoor take 11 wins as another Dutch driver Jarno Opmeer wins 7 races, as Thomas Tujula and Aleksandr Vartanyan win 1 race.

== Drivers ==
No.	Driver	Class	Rounds
1	(Russia) Aleksey Korneev	G	1, 4–5
2	(Russia) Ivan Matveev	G	4
3	(Finland) Henri Kauppi		1–2, 7
4	(Finland) Tuomas Tujula		All
5	(Russia) Nikita Sitnikov		1–2, 4–7
7	(Russia) Nikita Volegov		2–7
10	(Russia) Zakhar Slutskiy		1–3
11	(Russia) Gleb Zotov		1–5
14	(Finland) Juho Valtanen		All
15	(Russia) Artem Petrov		1–5
16	(Netherlands) Jarno Opmeer		All
17	(Russia) Nerses Isaakyan	G	5, 7
21	(Spain) Xavier Lloveras		All
22	(Netherlands) Richard Verschoor		All
25	(Russia) Artem Slutskiy		1–3
32	(Russia) Roman Lebedev		All
38	(Netherlands) Danny Kroes		1–3
40	(Cyprus) Vladimiros Tziortzis		All
41	(Russia) Aleksandr Vartanyan		All
50	(Finland) Tuomas Haapalainen		All
64	(Finland) Rasmus Markkanen		All
65	(Finland) Roope Markkanen		All
77	(Russia) Aleksandr Maslennikov		All

Icon	Class
G	Guest drivers ineligible to score points

== Race calendar and results ==
The final calendar was announced on 7 March 2016.

Round		Circuit	Date	Pole position	Fastest lap	Winning driver	Supporting
1	R1	(Russia) Sochi Autodrom, Sochi	30 April	(Netherlands) Richard Verschoor	(Netherlands) Jarno Opmeer	(Netherlands) Richard Verschoor	Russian Grand Prix
1	R2	(Russia) Sochi Autodrom, Sochi	1 May	(Netherlands) Jarno Opmeer	(Netherlands) Jarno Opmeer	(Netherlands) Jarno Opmeer	Russian Grand Prix
2	R3	(Netherlands) Circuit Park Zandvoort, Zandvoort	14 May	(Netherlands) Richard Verschoor	(Netherlands) Jarno Opmeer	(Finland) Tuomas Tujula	Pinksterraces
2	R4	(Netherlands) Circuit Park Zandvoort, Zandvoort	15 May		(Russia) Aleksandr Vartanyan	(Netherlands) Jarno Opmeer	Pinksterraces
2	R5	(Netherlands) Circuit Park Zandvoort, Zandvoort	15 May	(Netherlands) Richard Verschoor	(Finland) Tuomas Tujula	(Netherlands) Jarno Opmeer	Pinksterraces
3	R6	(Netherlands) Circuit Park Zandvoort, Zandvoort	4 June	(Netherlands) Richard Verschoor	(Netherlands) Jarno Opmeer	(Netherlands) Jarno Opmeer	Max Verstappen Fan Days
3	R7	(Netherlands) Circuit Park Zandvoort, Zandvoort	5 June		(Finland) Juho Valtanen	(Netherlands) Jarno Opmeer	Max Verstappen Fan Days
3	R8	(Netherlands) Circuit Park Zandvoort, Zandvoort	5 June	(Netherlands) Richard Verschoor	(Netherlands) Richard Verschoor	(Netherlands) Richard Verschoor	Max Verstappen Fan Days
4	R9	(Russia) Moscow Raceway, Volokolamsk	23 July	(Netherlands) Richard Verschoor	(Russia) Aleksey Korneev	(Netherlands) Richard Verschoor	Russian Circuit Racing Series
4	R10	(Russia) Moscow Raceway, Volokolamsk	24 July		(Netherlands) Richard Verschoor	(Netherlands) Richard Verschoor	Russian Circuit Racing Series
4	R11	(Russia) Moscow Raceway, Volokolamsk	24 July	(Netherlands) Richard Verschoor	(Netherlands) Richard Verschoor	(Netherlands) Richard Verschoor	Russian Circuit Racing Series
5	R12	(Russia) Moscow Raceway, Volokolamsk	20 August	(Netherlands) Richard Verschoor	(Spain) Xavier Lloveras	(Netherlands) Richard Verschoor	Deutsche Tourenwagen Masters
5	R13	(Russia) Moscow Raceway, Volokolamsk	21 August		(Netherlands) Richard Verschoor	(Netherlands) Richard Verschoor	Deutsche Tourenwagen Masters
5	R14	(Russia) Moscow Raceway, Volokolamsk	21 August	(Netherlands) Richard Verschoor	(Netherlands) Richard Verschoor	(Netherlands) Richard Verschoor	Deutsche Tourenwagen Masters
6	R15	(Sweden) Anderstorp Raceway, Anderstorp	3 September	(Netherlands) Jarno Opmeer	(Netherlands) Richard Verschoor	(Netherlands) Richard Verschoor	
6	R16	(Sweden) Anderstorp Raceway, Anderstorp	4 September		(Netherlands) Jarno Opmeer	(Netherlands) Richard Verschoor	
6	R17	(Sweden) Anderstorp Raceway, Anderstorp	4 September	(Netherlands) Jarno Opmeer	(Netherlands) Richard Verschoor	(Netherlands) Richard Verschoor	
7	R18	(Finland) Ahvenisto Race Circuit, Hämeenlinna	10 September	(Netherlands) Jarno Opmeer	(Russia) Aleksandr Vartanyan	(Netherlands) Jarno Opmeer	Rata-SM
7	R19	(Finland) Ahvenisto Race Circuit, Hämeenlinna	11 September		(Netherlands) Richard Verschoor	(Netherlands) Jarno Opmeer	Rata-SM
7	R20	(Finland) Ahvenisto Race Circuit, Hämeenlinna	11 September	(Netherlands) Richard Verschoor	(Netherlands) Richard Verschoor	(Russia) Aleksandr Vartanyan	Rata-SM

== Championship standings ==
Points are awarded to the top 10 classified finishers in each race. No points are awarded for pole position or fastest lap. At Sochi, only two races were held, and full points were awarded for Race 2.

Races	Position, points per race									
Races	**1st**	**2nd**	**3rd**	**4th**	**5th**	**6th**	**7th**	**8th**	**9th**	**10th**
Races 1 & 3	25	18	15	12	10	8	6	4	2	1
Race 2	15	12	10	8	6	4	2	1		

=== Drivers' Championship ===
Pos	Driver	SOC (Russia)		ZAN1 (Netherlands)			ZAN2 (Netherlands)			MSC1 (Russia)			MSC2 (Russia)			AND (Sweden)			AHV (Finland)			Pts
1	(Netherlands) Richard Verschoor	**1**	Ret	**2**	7	**12**	**2**	4	**1**	**1**	1	**1**	**1**	1	**1**	1	1	1	3	2	**2**	339
2	(Netherlands) Jarno Opmeer	2	**1**	3	1	1	1	1	3	5	2	3	10	16	2	**5**	9	**12**	**1**	1	4	270
3	(Russia) Aleksandr Vartanyan	4	4	5	6	3	7	3	2	4	4	9	4	4	13	6	Ret	2	8	9	1	198
4	(Finland) Rasmus Markkanen	Ret	5	16	5	Ret	3	6	5	11	9	12	5	3	Ret	10	12	3	4	6	3	124
5	(Finland) Tuomas Tujula	Ret	EX	1	3	2	6	8	Ret	12	10	7	7	7	4	8	Ret	4	7	8	Ret	120
6	(Finland) Roope Markkanen	3	Ret	8	Ret	6	4	2	6	14	12	5	13	10	3	7	11	Ret	6	5	6	118
7	(Russia) Nikita Sitnikov	5	3	9	Ret	4				2	3	2	Ret	13	15	4	4	10	13	Ret	8	113
8	(Finland) Tuomas Haapalainen	Ret	6	12	13	Ret	Ret	15	9	7	5	16	2	5	5	2	2	8	9	11	5	110
9	(Finland) Juho Valtanen	Ret	Ret	4	2	5	8	7	4	10	6	10	12	8	11	3	3	Ret	5	4	Ret	108
10	(Spain) Xavier Lloveras	8	7	Ret	15	11	5	5	7	8	7	6	11	9	6	Ret	6	9	10	7	7	80
11	(Russia) Nikita Volegov			11	10	Ret	10	10	10	6	13	8	9	12	9	9	10	5	14	14	Ret	38
12	(Netherlands) Danny Kroes	6	8	6	4	Ret	9	11	11													32
13	(Cyprus) Vladimiros Tziortzis	14	11	7	14	10	13	12	12	13	15	13	6	6	16	Ret	7	7	12	13	Ret	32
14	(Russia) Aleksandr Maslennikov	9	Ret	15	12	9	15	18	Ret	9	8	11	Ret	15	12	11	8	6	11	10	Ret	20
15	(Russia) Artem Petrov	10	EX	14	9	7	Ret	13	Ret	Ret	DNS	Ret	8	11	10							14
16	(Finland) Henri Kauppi	7	14	18	17	13													16	15	9	8
17	(Russia) Zakhar Slutskiy	Ret	9	13	11	8	11	9	13													8
18	(Russia) Roman Lebedev	13	10	17	16	Ret	14	14	8	15	14	17				12	5	11	15	12	Ret	6
19	(Russia) Artem Slutskiy	12	13	10	8	Ret	12	17	Ret													2
20	(Russia) Gleb Zotov	11	12	Ret	18	Ret	16	16	14	17	Ret	15	14	Ret	14							0
**Drivers ineligible to score points**
-	(Russia) Nerses Isaakyan												3	2	8				2	3	Ret	0
-	(Russia) Aleksey Korneev	Ret	2							3	16	4	DSQ	14	7							0
-	(Russia) Ivan Matveev									16	11	14										0
Pos	Driver	SOC (Russia)		ZAN1 (Netherlands)			ZAN2 (Netherlands)			MSC1 (Russia)			MSC2 (Russia)			AND (Sweden)			AHV (Finland)			Pts

Colour	Result
Gold	Winner
Silver	Second place
Bronze	Third place
Green	Points classification
Blue	Non-points classification
Blue	Non-classified finish (NC)
Purple	Retired, not classified (Ret)
Red	Did not qualify (DNQ)
Red	Did not pre-qualify (DNPQ)
Black	Disqualified (DSQ)
White	Did not start (DNS)
White	Withdrew (WD)
White	Race cancelled (C)
Blank	Did not practice (DNP)
Blank	Did not arrive (DNA)
Blank	Excluded (EX)

**Bold** – Pole
Italics – Fastest Lap
