= Karting Academy Trophy =

International kart racing competition

The FIA Karting Academy Trophy is an international kart racing competition organised by the FIA. Its inaugural season took place in 2010. Notable champions have been Formula One driver Charles Leclerc, F2 driver Richard Verschoor and NASCAR driver Connor Zilisch.

== Champions ==
Year	Champion	Chassis	Engine	Tyre	Second place	Third place
2010	(Finland) Niklas Tiihonen	Parolin	FIM		(France) Anthoine Hubert	(Greece) Filippos Kalesis
2011	(Monaco) Charles Leclerc	Parolin	FIM	LC	(United Kingdom) Ben Barnicoat	(Finland) Juho Valtanen
2012	(Finland) Joonas Lappalainen	Parolin	FIM	LC	(Spain) Javier Cobián	(France) Erwan Julé
2013	(Belgium) Maxime Potty	Parolin	FIM	V	(Spain) Arturo Melgar	(Turkey) Berkay Besler
2014	(Netherlands) Richard Verschoor	Parolin	FIM	B	(Japan) Kakunoshin Ohta	(Netherlands) Rinus VeeKay
2015	(Spain) Marta García	Parolin	FIM	B	(Spain) Xavier Lloveras	(Spain) Alejandro Lahoz Lopez
2016	(United Kingdom) Callum Bradshaw	Exprit	Vortex	V	(Sweden) Alfred Nilsson	(Netherlands) Kas Haverkort
2017	(Belgium) Xavier Handsaeme	Exprit	Vortex	B	(Netherlands) Tijmen van der Helm	(Brazil) Francisco Melo D. Porto
2018	(Spain) Mari Boya	Exprit	Vortex	LC	(Belgium) Kobe Pauwels	(Brazil) Guilherme Figueiredo
2019	(Lithuania) Kajus Siksnelis	Exprit	Vortex	B	(Singapore) Christian Ho	(Netherlands) Robert de Haan
2020	(United States) Connor Zilisch	Exprit	Vortex	V	(France) Macéo Capietto	(Luxembourg) Maxime Furon-Castelain
2021	(Poland) Maciej Gladysz	Exprit	Vortex	MG	(Denmark) David Walther	(Ukraine) Oleksandr Bondarev
2022	(France) Arthur Dorison	Exprit	Vortex	LC	(Luxembourg) Guillaume Bouzar	(Colombia) Matias Orjuela
2023	(Spain) Hugo Marti	Exprit	Vortex	V	(Australia) Max Walton	(Lithuania) Markas Šilkūnas
2024	(Belgium) Gilles Herman	Exprit	Vortex	MA	(Switzerland) Dan Allemann	(Slovakia) Jakub Gasparovic

== See also ==
- Karting World Championship
- CIK-FIA Karting European Championship
