= 2011 CIK-FIA Karting Academy Trophy =

International karting championship

The 2011 CIK-FIA Karting Academy Trophy was the 2nd season of the CIK-FIA Karting Academy Trophy, an international karting championship. Charles Leclerc clinched the title ahead of Ben Barnicoat and Juho Valtanen.

== Standings ==
Heat qualifying points

Points are awarded to the top 10.

Position	1st	2nd	3rd	4th	5th	6th	7th	8th	9th	10th
Points	10	9	8	7	6	5	4	3	2	1

Feature race points

Points are awarded to the top fifteen.

Position	1st	2nd	3rd	4th	5th	6th	7th	8th	9th	10th	11th	12th	13th	14th	15th
Points	25	18	16	13	11	10	9	8	7	6	5	4	3	2	1

Championship top 15

Pos.	Driver	Points
1	(Monaco) Charles Leclerc	253
2	(United Kingdom) Ben Barnicoat	240
3	(Finland) Juho Valtanen	217
4	(Greece) Filippos Kalesis	200
5	(Finland) Aatu Moilanen	195
6	(Russia) Vsevolod Gagen	189
7	(Netherlands) Marijn Kremers	185
8	(France) Dorian Boccolacci	183
9	(Spain) Mikel Azcona Troyas	172
10	(Belgium) Simon Miguet	166
11	(Ukraine) Oleksandr Tkachenko	157
12	(Albania) Aleksander Ndrio	152
13	(Austria) Florian Janits	142
14	(Denmark) Frederik Schandorff	142
15	(Norway) Martin Ellegård	138
