= Richard Verschoor =

Dutch racing driver (born 2000)

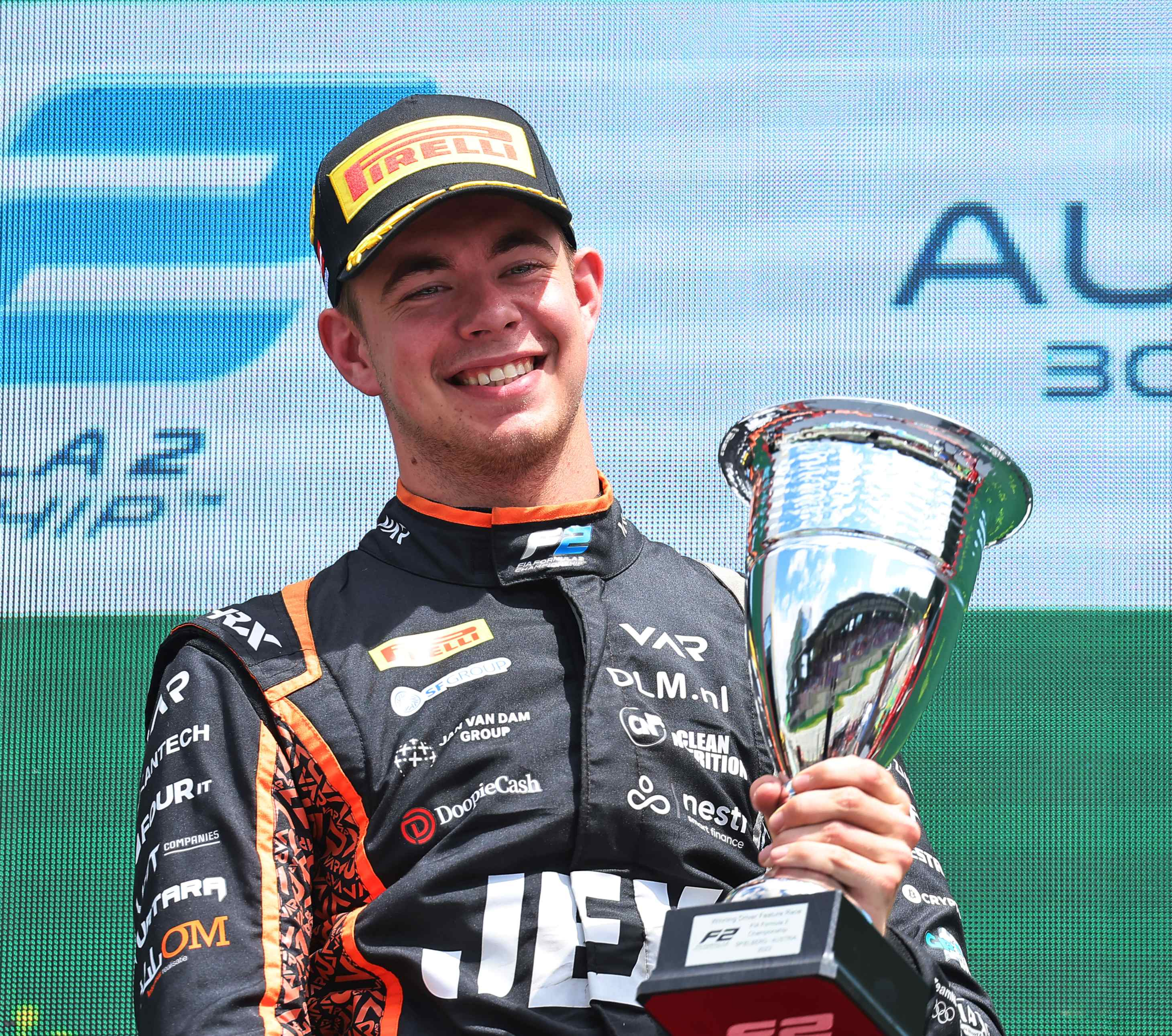
- Verschoor on the podium at the 2023 Spielberg Formula 2 round
- Nationality: (Netherlands) Dutch
- Born: 16 December 2000 (age 25) Benschop, Utrecht, Netherlands

European Le Mans Series career
- Debut season: 2026
- Current team: Duqueine Team
- Categorisation: FIA Silver (until 2021); FIA Gold (2022–)
- Car number: 30
- Starts: 3
- Wins: 0
- Podiums: 2
- Poles: 0
- Fastest laps: 0
- Best finish: TBD in 2026 (LMP2 Pro-Am)

Previous series
- 2021–2025; 2019–2020; 2018; 2017–2018; 2017–2018; 2017–2018; 2016; 2016; 2016: FIA Formula 2; FIA Formula 3; GP3 Series; Formula Renault Eurocup; Formula Renault NEC; Toyota Racing Series; SMP F4; F4 Spanish; ADAC F4

Championship titles
- 2019; 2016; 2016; 2015; 2014: Macau Grand Prix; F4 Spanish; SMP F4; German Karting Championship; Karting Academy Trophy

Richard Verschoor (Dutch pronunciation: [ˈriɕɑrt vərˈsxoːr]; born 16 December 2000) is a Dutch racing driver who competes in the LMP2 Pro-Am class of the European Le Mans Series with Duqueine Team.

Born in Benschop, Utrecht, Verschoor began karting in 2011, graduating to single-seaters in 2016 where he won the SMP F4 and Spanish F4 that year. He spent two years in Formula Renault Eurocup that yielded little success, before moving up to FIA Formula 3 for 2019 and 2020, competing for MP Motorsport. Verschoor graduated to Formula 2 in 2021 with MP Motorsport and spent five seasons in the category, his best being third during his final season in 2025.

Verschoor became the first Dutch driver to win the Macau Grand Prix, winning at his first attempt in 2019. He is also a McLaren Driver Development Programme member. As of 2025, Verschoor currently holds the most starts in the FIA Formula 2 Championship (125).

== Junior racing career ==
=== Karting ===
Verschoor started karting competitively in 2011, contesting various national championships in the Netherlands over the following three years. He stepped up to the European level in 2014 and won the CIK-FIA Karting Academy Trophy. Verschoor continued his success in 2015 by claiming the German Karting Championship, while also finishing third in the European CIK-FIA KF Championship and sixth in the world championship.

=== Formula 4 ===
Verschoor graduated to single-seaters in 2016, joining the SMP F4 Championship at the age of fifteen. He won on debut in Sochi, and went on to dominate the season with ten consecutive victories, securing the title with three races remaining and finishing nearly 70 points clear of compatriot Jarno Opmeer.

Alongside his SMP campaign, Verschoor contested the inaugural F4 Spanish Championship with MP Motorsport. He won the opening race of the season and comfortably secured a second title after winning all but three races. He also made selected appearances in ADAC Formula 4 with Motopark and in the Italian F4 Championship with Bhaitech Engineering.

=== Toyota Racing Series ===
==== 2017 ====
Before beginning his main campaign in Europe, Verschoor competed in the 2017 Toyota Racing Series with Giles Motorsport. He claimed two podiums during the opening round at the Euromarque Motorsport Park to lead the standings early on, before inheriting his maiden victory at Teretonga after Thomas Randle received a post-race penalty. Another victory in the third race strengthened his championship challenge. Although his form faded during the final three rounds of the season, he added one further win and podium, eventually finishing third in the standings.

==== 2018 ====
Verschoor returned to the series in 2018 with M2 Competition. He won the opening race in each of the first three rounds, emerging as a title contender alongside Robert Shwartzman. Despite claiming two victories during the final round at Manfeild, Verschoor ultimately finished runner-up in the championship, five points behind Shwartzman.

=== Formula Renault Eurocup ===
==== 2017 ====
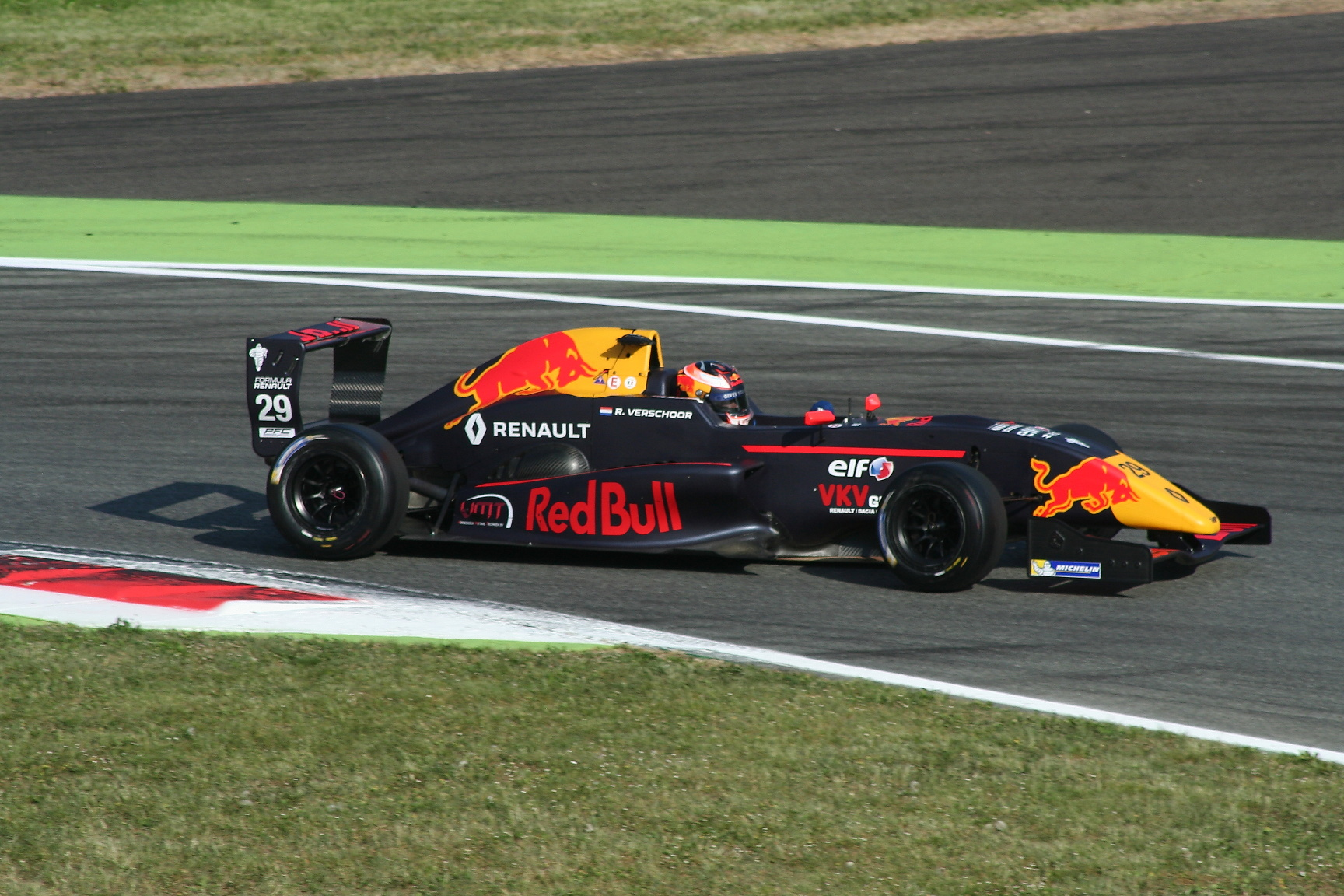
Verschoor racing in the 2017 Formula Renault Eurocup

In January 2017, Verschoor remained with MP Motorsport to contest the Formula Renault Eurocup alongside fellow Red Bull junior Neil Verhagen. After scoring points during the opening four rounds, his campaign was hindered by a seven-race non-scoring streak between Hungary and Austria. He recovered with fourth place at Paul Ricard, before securing his maiden Eurocup podium with third at the Barcelona finale. Verschoor finished ninth overall in the standings and fourth among rookies.

Verschoor also contested selected rounds of the Northern European Cup that year. On his debut weekend in Assen, he claimed both a podium and a victory. and later added another podium in Hockenheim to also finish ninth overall despite his limited schedule.

==== 2018 ====
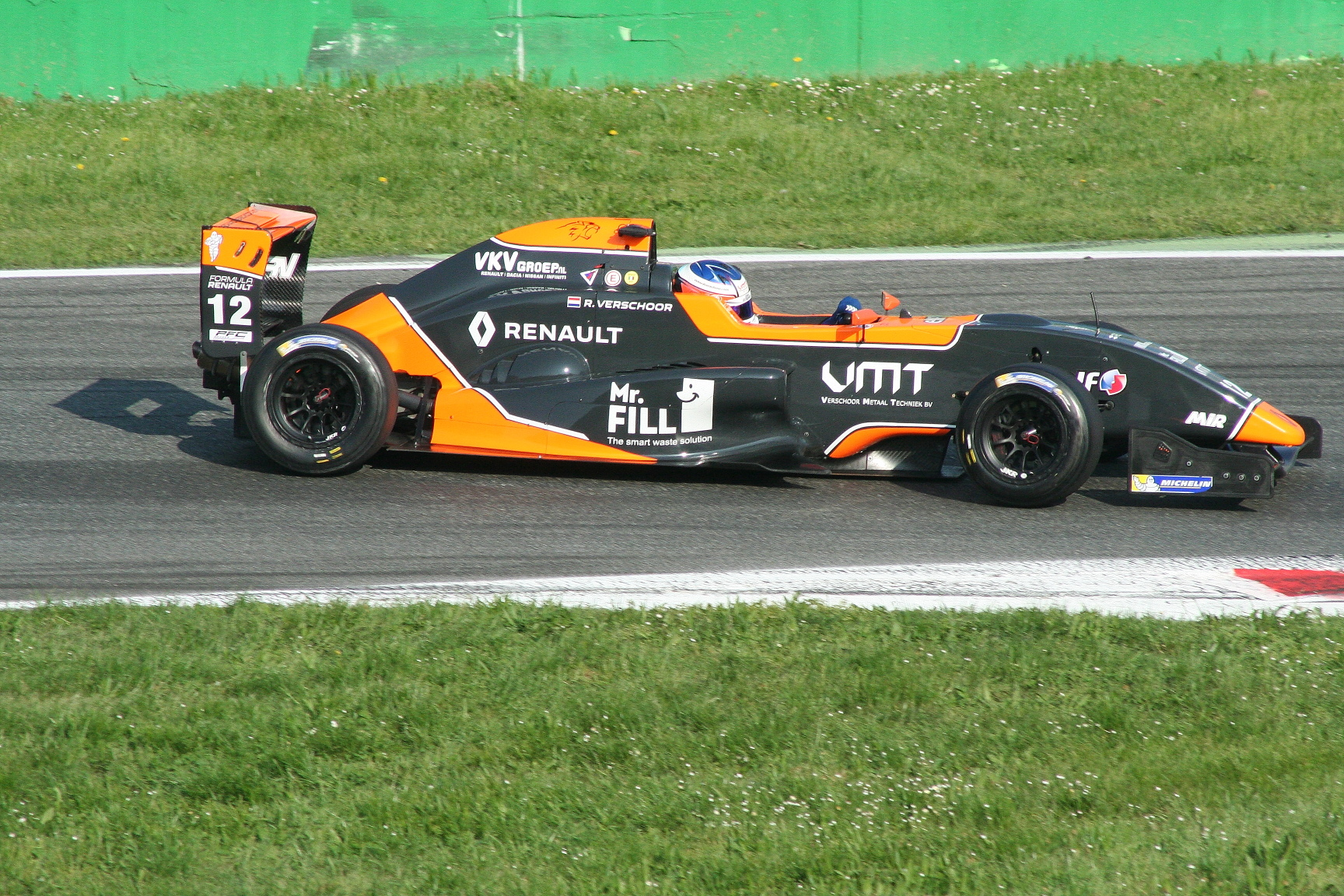
Verschoor racing in the 2018 Formula Renault Eurocup

Verschoor switched to Josef Kaufmann Racing, for the 2018 season, joining the outfit that had won the previous two Eurocup drivers' titles with Lando Norris and Sacha Fenestraz. However, his campaign proved difficult following his departure from the Red Bull Junior Team. His best result came with second place in a red-flagged race at the Red Bull Ring, while three additional points finishes followed before he departed the team mid-season. Three more points finishes followed, Verschoor ended the year thirteenth in the standings with one podium.

Verschoor also made a guest appearance in the Northern European Cup at Spa-Francorchamps, finishing eighth and tenth across the two races.

=== GP3 Series ===
Verschoor entered the GP3 Series midway through 2018 after Roberto Merhi left MP Motorsport's Formula 2 lineup, prompting Dorian Boccolacci to move up and vacate the team's GP3 seat. Verschoor joined the championship from the Spa-Francorchamps round onwards. Despite being excluded from qualifying on debut weekend, he scored points with seventh in the sprint race. He added four further points finishes during the remaining rounds, including a podium in Sochi. and concluded the season fifteenth in the standings with 30 points.

=== FIA Formula 3 Championship ===
==== 2019 ====
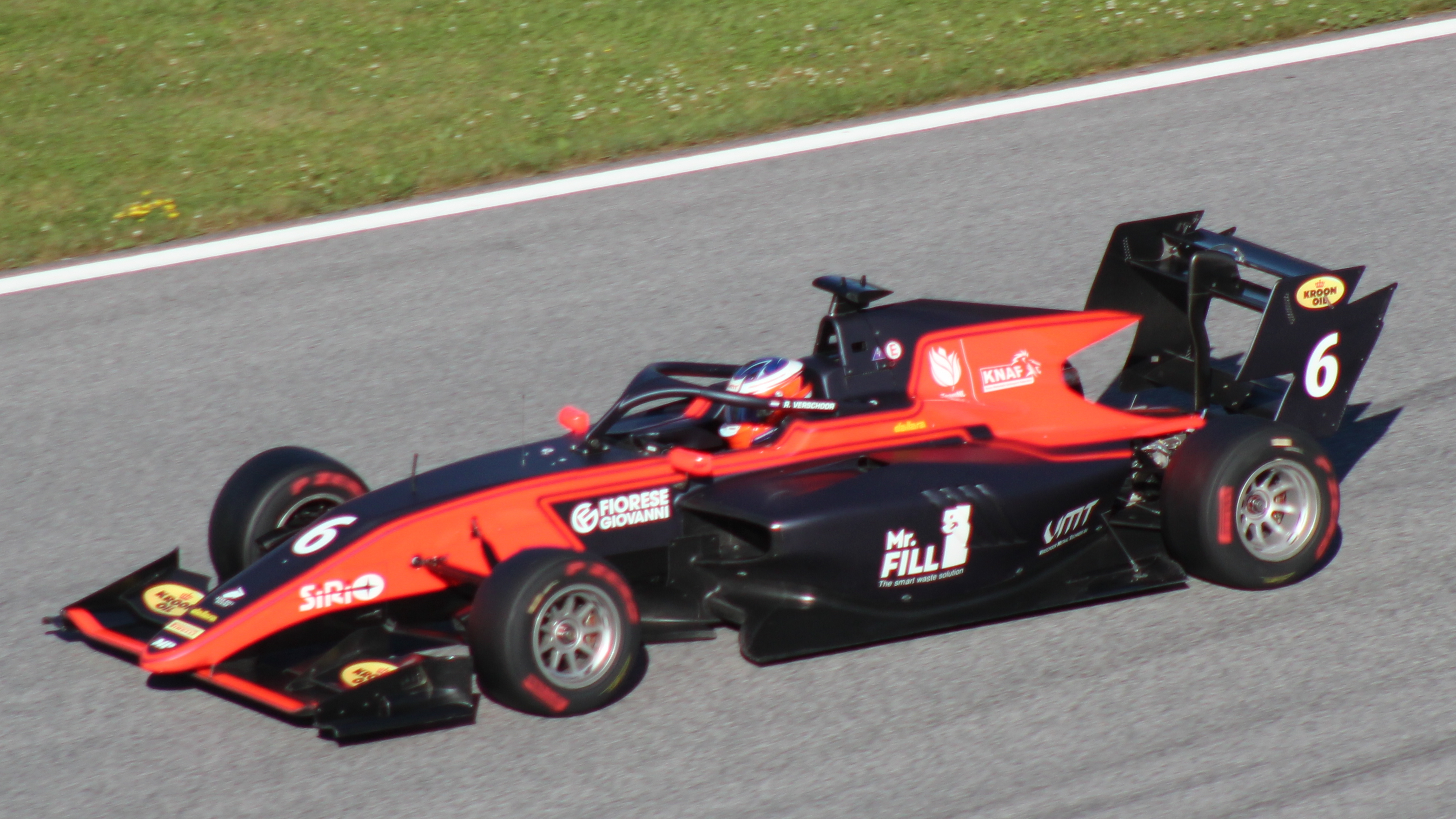
Verschoor driving for MP Motorsport at the 2019 Spielberg Formula 3 round

In 2019, Verschoor remained with MP Motorsport for the inaugural FIA Formula 3 Championship. He endured a difficult start to the season, failing to score points in Barcelona after qualifying fifteenth. In Paul Ricard, he qualified thirteenth and finished fourteenth in the first race, before charging through the field to fourth in Race 2, scoring his first points of the season. Verschoor scored points again at the Red Bull Ring, after overtaking Niko Kari late in Race 1 to finish tenth, but then he went scoreless over the next three rounds. This included a difficult Silverstone weekend where he finished seventeenth and 21st, and a retirement from Race 1 in Hungary after suffering a technical issue on the final lap. After finishing seventeenth and eleventh in Spa-Francorchamps, he qualified eighth in Monza, later starting third due to grid penalties for other drivers. He briefly led a multi-car battle for the lead before eventually finishing fifth, later promoted to fourth after Marcus Armstrong received a penalty. He added another fourth place in Race 2, finishing just behind Liam Lawson. At the Sochi finale, Verschoor finished tenth and seventh across the two races, securing further points finishes. He ended the season thirteenth in the standings with 34 points.

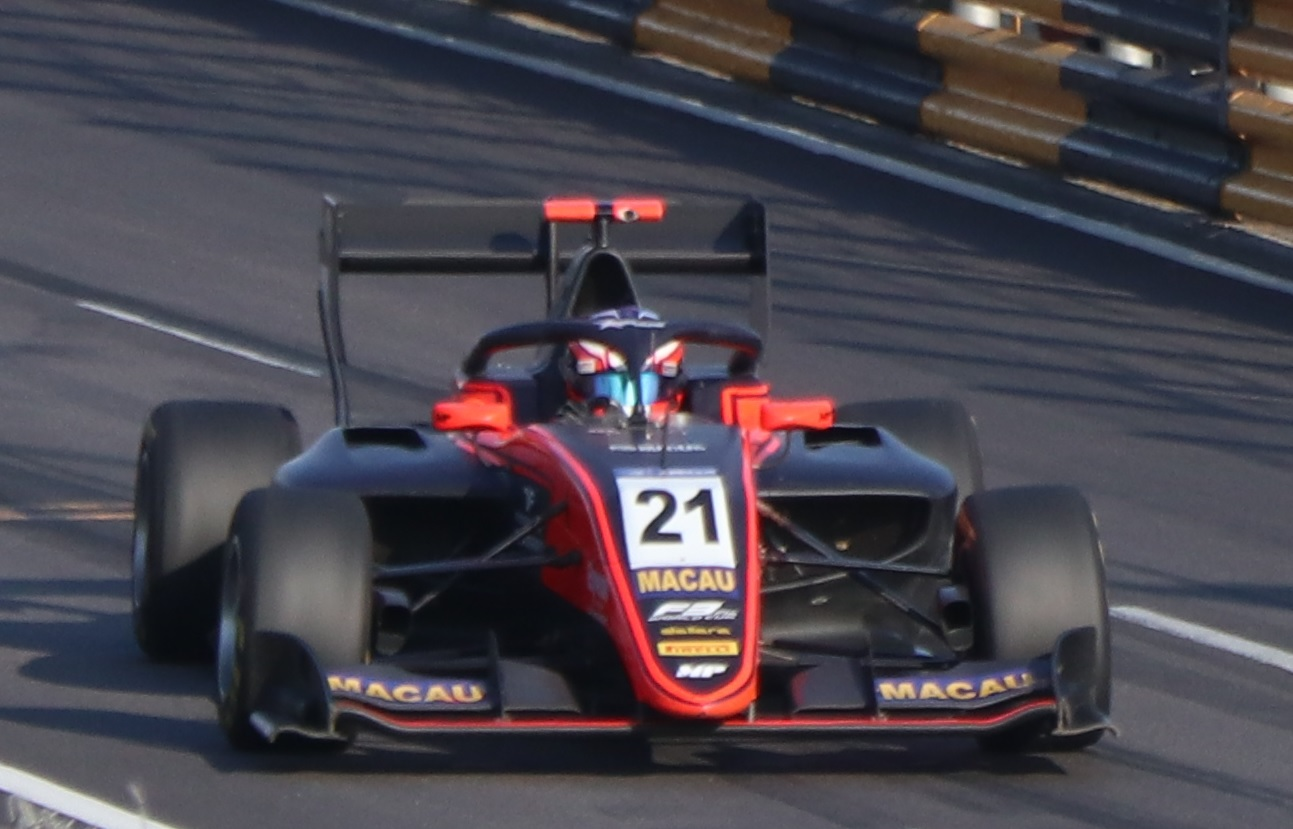
Verschoor at the 2019 Macau Grand Prix

Following the Formula 3 season, Verschoor competed in the Macau Grand Prix with MP Motorsport. After qualifying fifth and finishing fourth in the qualification race, he overtook Robert Shwartzman and Christian Lundgaard early before passing Jüri Vips for the lead on lap eight. Despite sustaining bent steering after clipping the wall during the move, Verschoor held off Vips to become the first Dutch driver to win the Macau Grand Prix, as well as the first rookie winner since Keisuke Kunimoto in 2008.

==== 2020 ====
Verschoor remained with MP Motorsport for the 2020 FIA Formula 3 Championship, partnering Bent Viscaal and Lukas Dunner. He enjoyed a strong start to the season at the Red Bull Ring, qualifying ninth before scoring points in Race 1 with eighth place. Starting third for Race 2, he overtook David Beckmann and Clément Novalak to secure second place and his maiden Formula 3 podium. During the second Spielberg round, Verschoor recovered from eleventh on the grid to seventh in wet conditions during Race 1, before finishing fourth in Race 2 after benefitting from a late collision between Liam Lawson and Jake Hughes. In Hungary, he added further points finishes with fourth and fifth places across the two races, the former coming after Logan Sargeant received a penalty. Verschoor endured a more difficult run over the next rounds. After qualifying fifteenth in Silverstone, he narrowly missed out on points in Race 1 before finishing ninth in Race 2. A poor qualifying result of 27th in the second Silverstone round limited him to nineteenth and eighteenth-place finishes. In Barcelona, he finished ninth in Race 1 and fourth in Race 2 after briefly running in podium contention.

In Spa-Francorchamps, Verschoor recorded his best qualifying of the season in sixth. Although he dropped to tenth in Race 1, it handed him reverse-grid (Note: In the 2020 FIA Formula 3 Championship, the top 10 finishers in Race 1 were subjected to a reverse-grid in the sprint race.) pole for Race 2. He lost the lead to Sargeant on lap three and eventually finished seventh. A difficult Monza weekend followed, where a technical issue left him 27th, although he recovered to tenth in a chaotic second race.but started 14th due to penalties. Verschoor ended the campaign with fifth place in the Mugello finale during the second race. He finished ninth in the standings with 69 points, recording thirteen top-ten finishes and ending the year as MP Motorsport's highest-scoring driver.

=== FIA Formula 2 Championship ===
==== 2021 ====
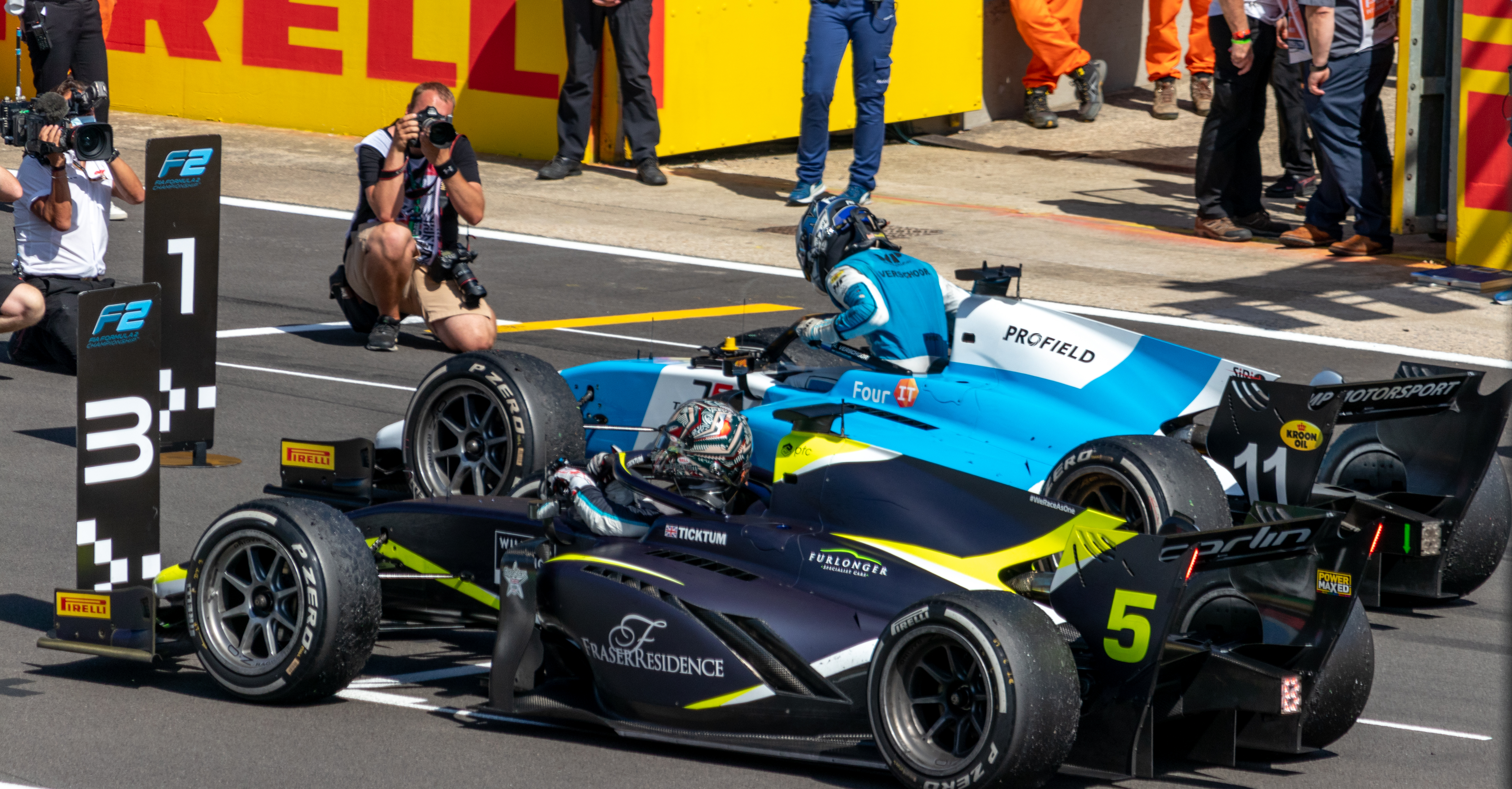
Verschoor after winning a race in the 2021 Silverstone Formula 2 round (car behind)

Verschoor participated in Formula 2 pre-season testing with MP Motorsport before joining the team on a round-by-round basis for the opening rounds of the season alongside Lirim Zendeli; from Silverstone onwards, his deal was extended to cover the remainder of the campaign. He made an immediate impression in Bahrain, qualifying sixth before being promoted to fifth after Jüri Vips was disqualified. Although he retired from the opening sprint race after contact with Dan Ticktum, Verschoor recovered strongly in Sprint Race 2 to finish fifth after gaining eight positions in the closing laps. In the feature race, an alternate tyre strategy briefly elevated him into the lead after overtaking Marcus Armstrong and Oscar Piastri, though fading tyre performance dropped him to fourth at the finish. In Monaco, after qualifying fifteenth, he finished thirteenth and seventh in the sprint races before scoring a point with tenth in the feature. In the feature race, he took a solitary point with tenth. A difficult Baku weekend followed, where he qualified sixteenth and failed to score after retiring from the second sprint following contact with Roy Nissany and later colliding with Bent Viscaal in the feature race.

In Silverstone, Verschoor enjoyed his strongest weekend of the season. He qualified third behind Piastri and Zhou Guanyu before claiming his maiden Formula 2 victory in Sprint Race 2 from reverse-grid pole after a strong start. He followed it with fourth place in the feature race after pressuring Piastri for the final podium position in the closing laps. After qualifying twentieth in Monza, he recovered from technical issues in Sprint Race 1 and climbed from the back to seventh in the feature race, only to be disqualified for a technical infringement regarding car weight. In Sochi, he scored points in both races with eighth-place finishes. Due to budgetary issues, MP Motorsport replaced Verschoor with Jack Doohan for the final two rounds of the season. However, he returned for the Abu Dhabi finale with Charouz Racing System, replacing the injured Enzo Fittipaldi. He scored a point in the feature race with tenth and ended the season eleventh in the standings with 56 points.

==== 2022 ====
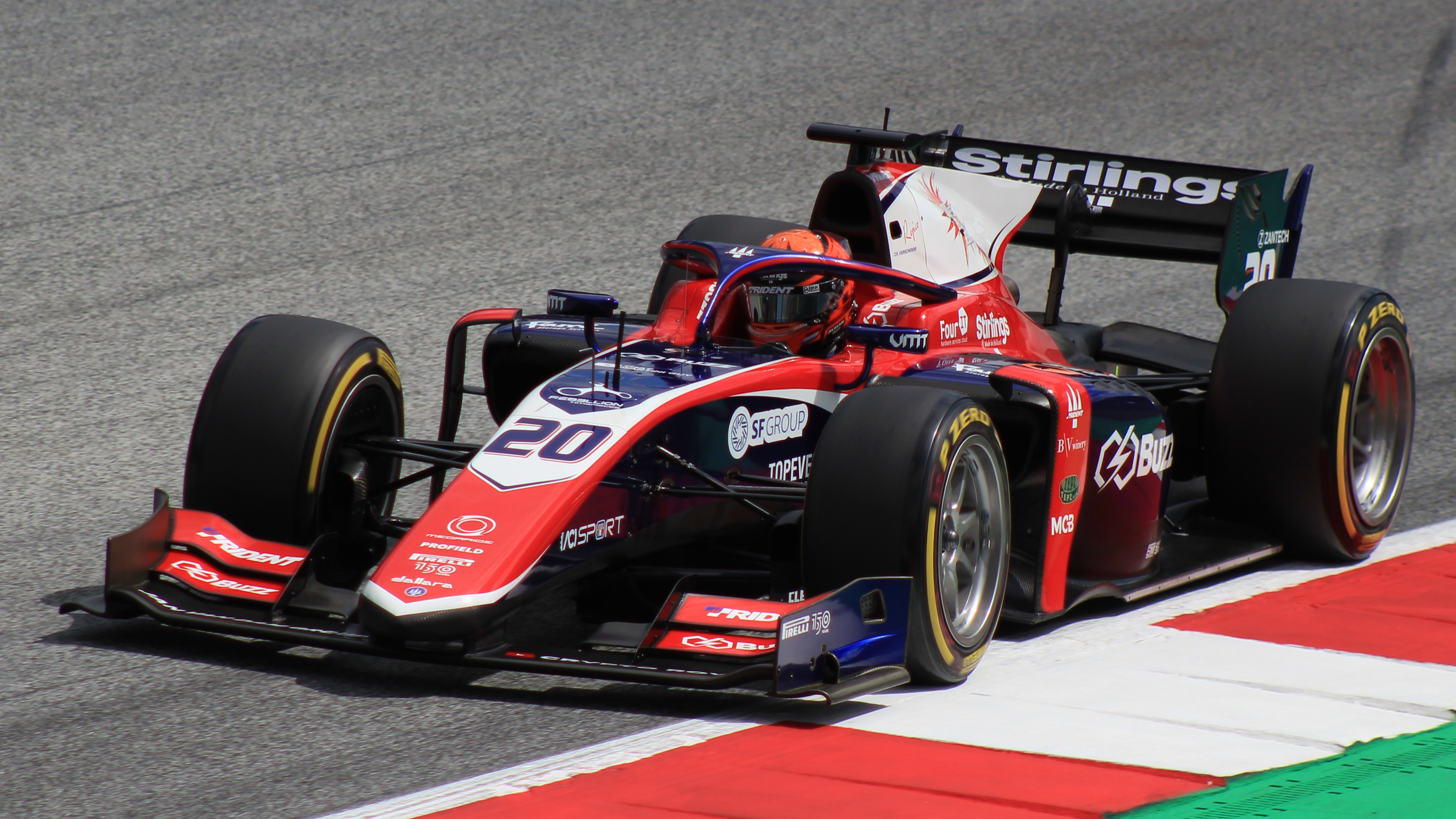
Verschoor driving the Dallara F2 2018 during the 2022 Spielberg Formula 2 round

At the end of February 2022, Verschoor joined Trident for the Formula 2 season alongside Calan Williams, ending a six-year association with MP Motorsport. He made an immediate impact in Bahrain, qualifying ninth before winning the opening sprint race from the front row after a slow start for Felipe Drugovich, securing Trident's maiden Formula 2 victory. However, he retired from the feature race after contact with Enzo Fittipaldi. Verschoor continued his strong form in Jeddah by qualifying second, finishing fifth in the sprint and taking his maiden feature race podium with second place behind Drugovich. The result elevated him to third in the championship standings.

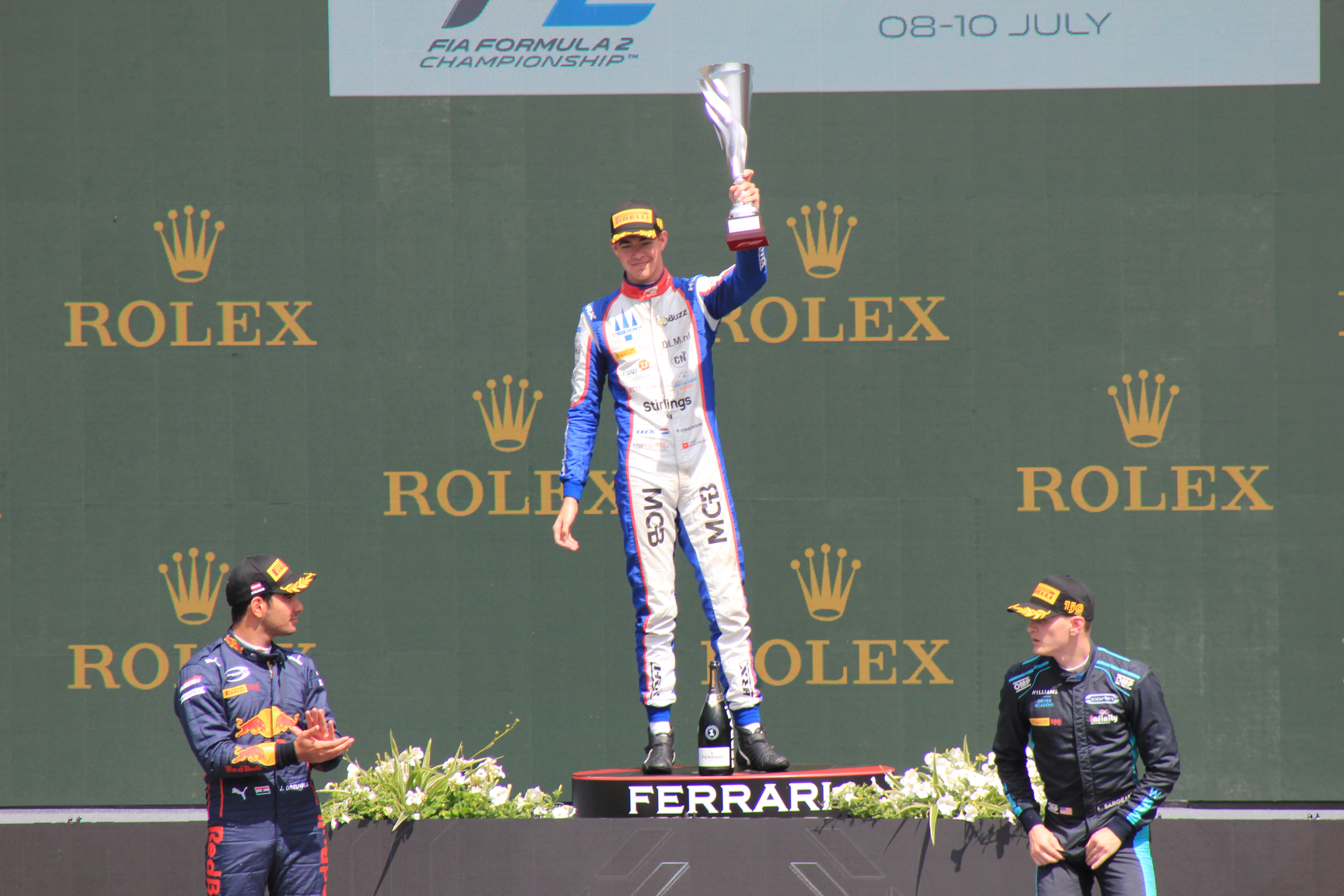
Verschoor (center) winning the feature race in Austria before his disqualification.

However, Verschoor and Trident endured a difficult run over the following rounds, failing to score points across Imola, Barcelona and Monaco. This included qualifying nineteenth in Imola and twentieth in Barcelona, while car issues prevented him from participating in Monaco qualifying altogether. Despite this, he recovered positions in the races, including finishing twelfth in the Monaco feature race. Verschoor returned to form in Baku by qualifying sixth and finishing fifth in a chaotic feature race, although he retired from the sprint after crashing while battling Liam Lawson for third. After a subdued Silverstone weekend, he qualified eighth at the Red Bull Ring and finished sixth in the sprint race. In the feature race, he initially secured victory after gambling on slick tyres in changing conditions and crossing the line first by several seconds. However, he was disqualified after his car was found to contain insufficient fuel, promoting Logan Sargeant to victory. His difficult run continued in Paul Ricard, where a stalled start and technical issues compromised his sprint race, before a powertrain failure on the final lap of the feature denied him points. In Hungary, Verschoor recovered from fourteenth on the grid to finish eighth in the feature race using an alternate strategy.

In Spa-Francorchamps, Verschoor finished fifth in the sprint and fourth in the feature after charging through the field on softer tyres. He then secured a home podium in Zandvoort by finishing second in the feature race after overtaking Dennis Hauger during the pit cycle, although he also eliminated Jack Doohan in a safety car restart collision for which he later apologised. In Monza, he finished eighth in the sprint after a penalty for an off-track advantage demoted him three places, while he placed ninth in the feature after an alternate strategy was disrupted by a safety car and a red flag period. At the Abu Dhabi finale, Verschoor started from reverse pole in the sprint race and finished second behind Lawson, before adding seventh in the feature. He ended the season twelfth in the standings with 103 points, one win and three additional podiums.

==== 2023 ====
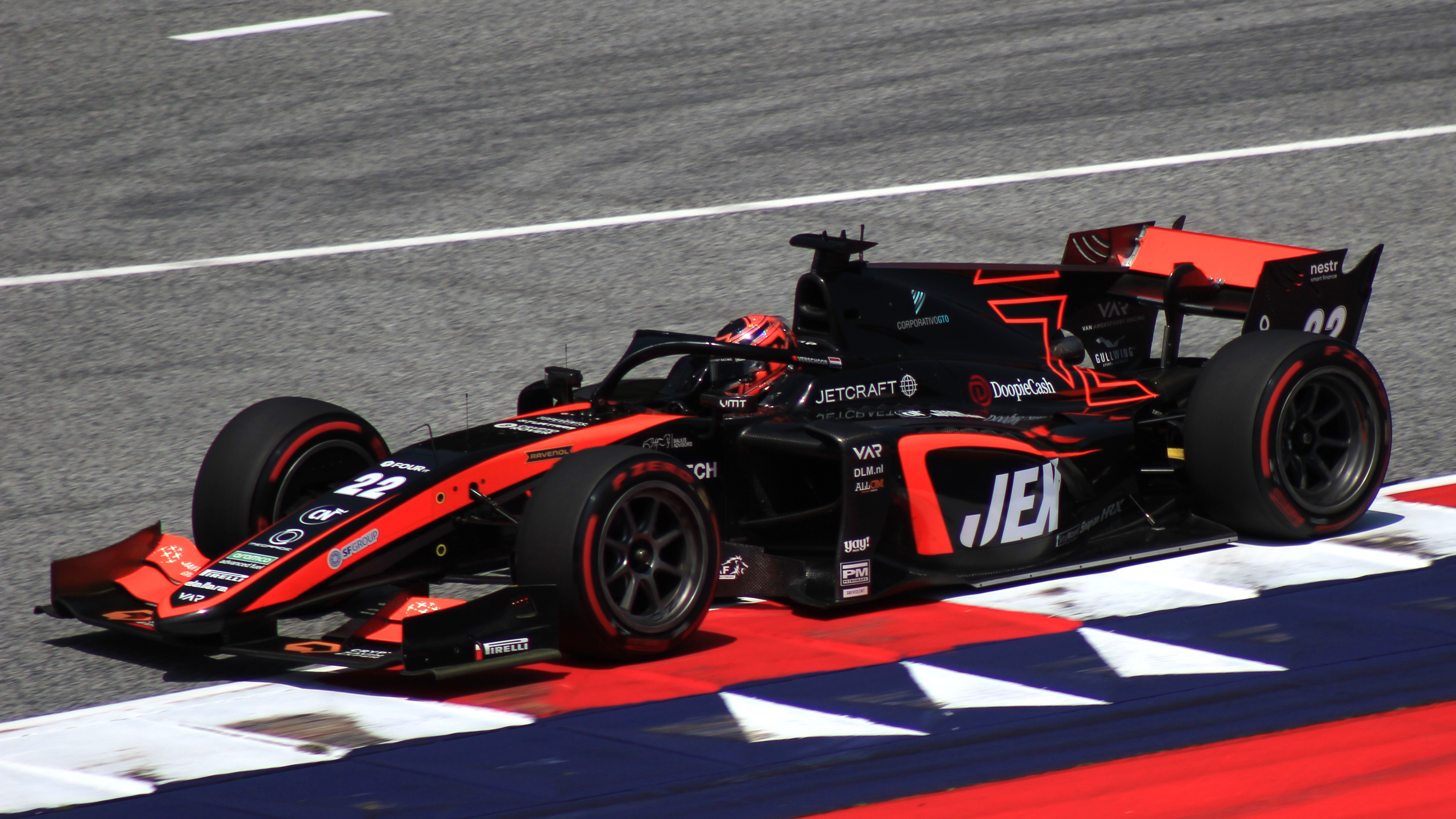
Verschoor driving for Van Amersfoort Racing during the 2023 Spielberg Formula 2 round

Verschoor participated in post-season testing with Van Amersfoort Racing and on his 22nd birthday, the Dutch outfit confirmed him for the 2023 season alongside Juan Manuel Correa. He began the season strongly in Bahrain by qualifying third. Although he failed to score in the sprint race, Verschoor recovered from a first-lap spin caused by Frederik Vesti in the feature race to finish fifth after an aggressive recovery drive on fresher tyres. In Jeddah, a mistake in qualifying left him down the order, but he recovered from twentieth on the grid to sixth in the feature race using an alternate strategy. An ill-timed red flag in Melbourne qualifying relegated him to eighteenth for both races, though he improved to score points in both, finishing tenth in the sprint and seventh in the feature. In Baku, Verschoor started from reverse pole in the sprint but retired after spinning into the barriers at Turn 1. He recovered to eighth in the feature race, and followed this with consecutive fourth-place finishes in Monaco, before scoring sixth and tenth in the Barcelona races respectively.

In Austria, after qualifying twelfth and spinning out of the sprint race, Verschoor executed an alternate strategy to perfection in the feature race, using a late safety car period to switch onto fresher tyres. He then overtook race leader Vesti in the closing laps to secure victory. However, his momentum faded over the next two rounds, as a non-scoring weekend at Silverstone ended his streak of scoring points in every round since the 2022 Budapest round, before he managed just a single point in Hungary. In Spa-Francorchamps, Verschoor inherited the lead of the sprint race after Jehan Daruvala retired with a loose headrest, but lost victory on the penultimate lap to Enzo Fittipaldi and finished second on the road. He was later disqualified due to an illegal throttle map. Nevertheless, he bounced back with a sixth place in the feature race. In Zandvoort, Verschoor qualified fourteenth and finished fourth in the feature race after benefitting from multiple retirements ahead. In Monza, he claimed third in the sprint race after defending from Théo Pourchaire, but a five-second penalty for an unsafe release in the feature dropped him from fourth to twelfth.

Verschoor qualified seventh for the Abu Dhabi finale. He finished third in the sprint race after running second for much of the race, but retired from the feature race with an engine issue. He ended the season ninth in the standings with 108 points, scoring one victory, three podiums and one fastest lap, while comfortably outperforming teammate Correa.

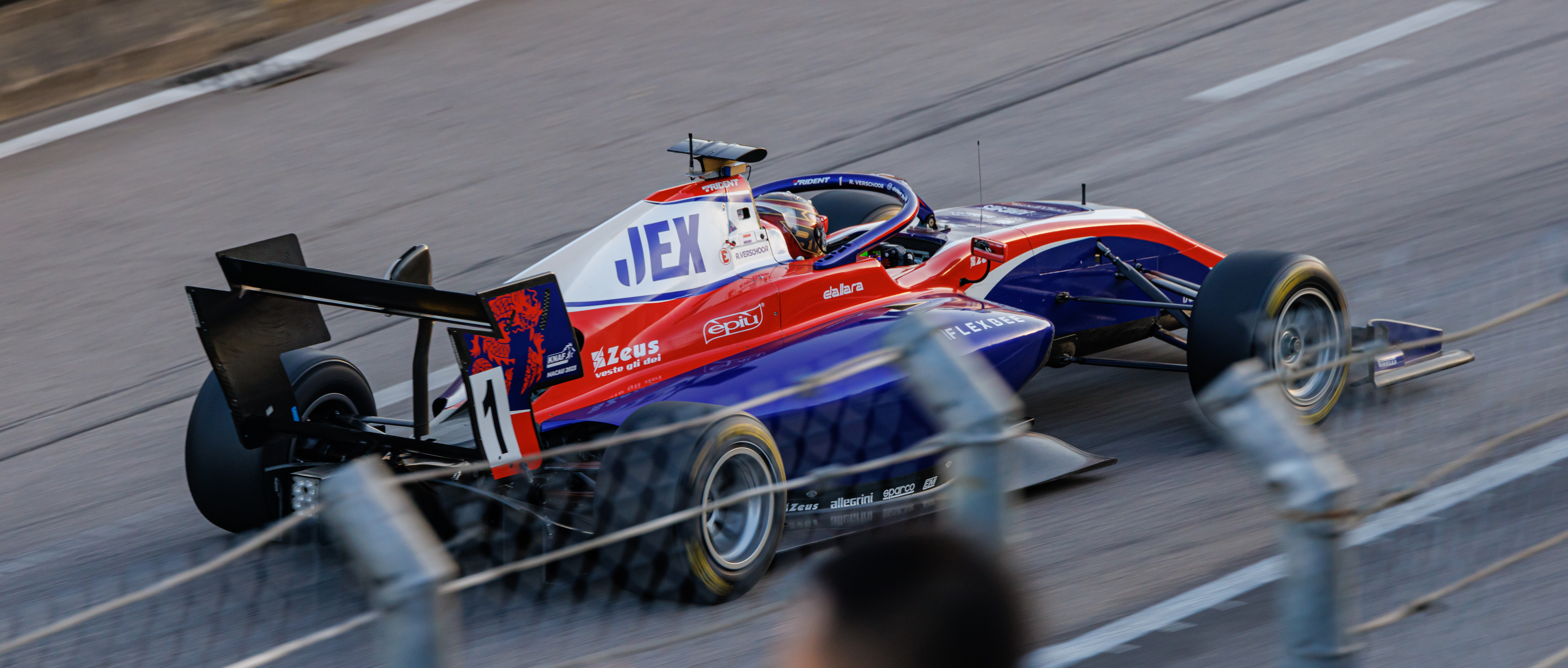
Verschoor at the 2023 Macau Grand Prix

2023 Macau Grand Prix
Verschoor returned to Trident for the Macau Grand Prix, and finished the race in sixth place.

==== 2024 ====
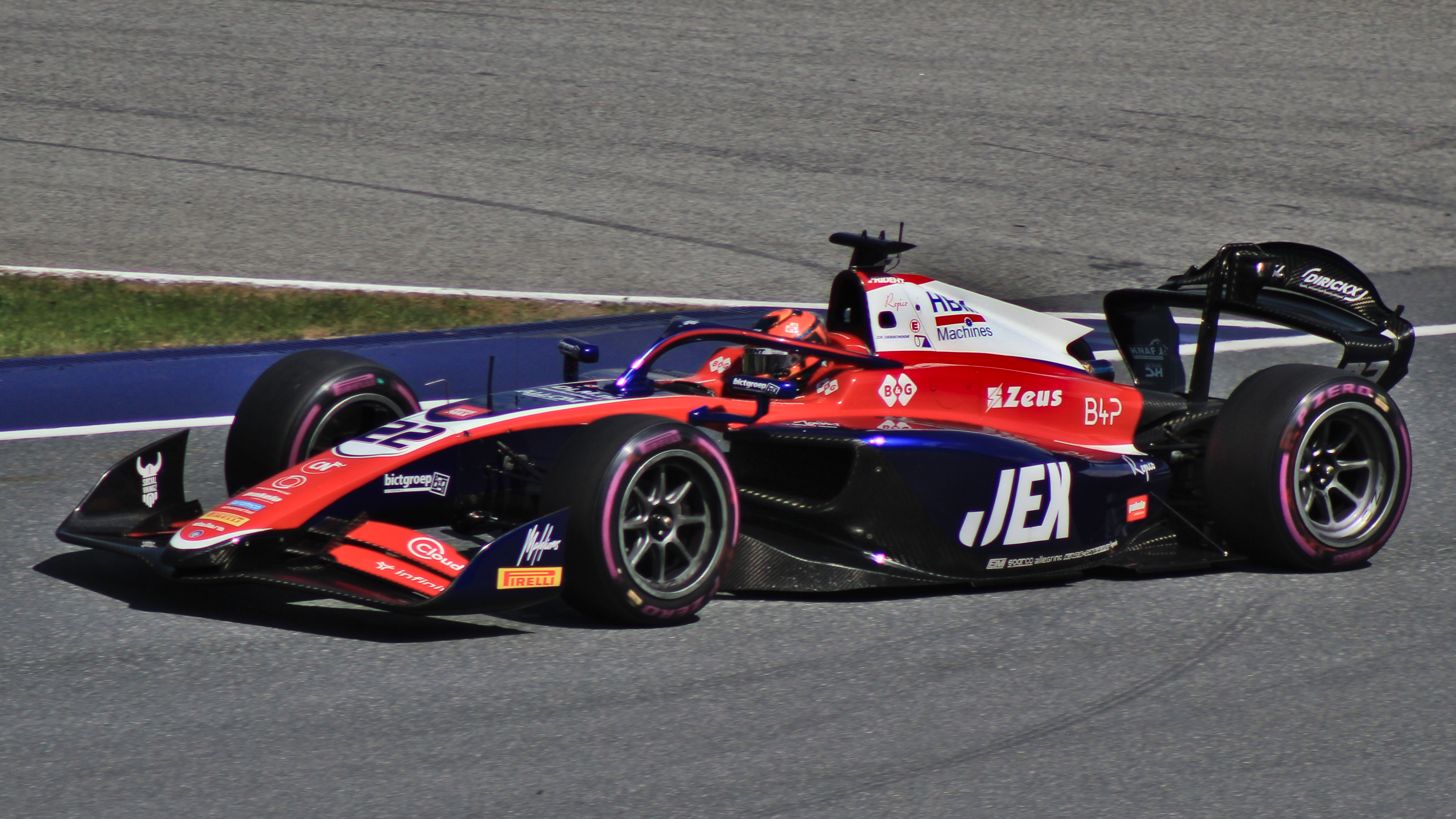
Verschoor driving the Dallara F2 2024 during the 2024 Spielberg Formula 2 round

Verschoor returned to Trident for his fourth season in the 2024 FIA Formula 2 Championship in 2024, partnering Roman Staněk. After an uneventful opening round in Bahrain, he crossed the line first in the Jeddah sprint race after overtaking Paul Aron for the lead. However, he was later disqualified due to an incorrect throttle pedal progressivity map, marking the second time he had lost a Formula 2 victory for a technical infringement. He placed eighth in the feature race. In Melbourne, Verschoor qualified third, but after retiring from the sprint race following a spin, he finished sixth in the feature. He scored points in both races in Imola with seventh and tenth-place finishes respectively.

Verschoor secured his maiden Formula 2 pole position in Monaco, despite describing his car as "not perfect". However, a technical issue at the halfway mark of the feature race caused him to fall down the order before retiring on lap 31. He then endured three consecutive non-scoring rounds. In Hungary, Verschoor started the sprint from reverse pole and controlled the race to take victory after managing his tyres effectively on the hard compound. However, he was later stripped of the win due to an illegal plank assembly. He responded by charging to third place in the feature race, overtaking Gabriel Bortoleto on the final lap for the podium. In Spa-Francorchamps, he added another podium with third place in a rain-shortened sprint race, before finishing fifth in the feature.

After qualifying nineteenth in Monza, a well-timed safety car during the feature race allowed Verschoor to gain track position through the pit cycle, and he ultimately finished third. In Baku, he secured his second pole of the season. Following a seventeenth-place finish in the sprint race, Verschoor lost the lead of the feature race to Victor Martins in the opening stages, but regained net track position during the pit stops before cruising to his first victory of the campaign. The result elevated him into the top ten of the championship standings for the first time that season.

Ahead of the Qatar round, Verschoor announced a return to MP Motorsport for the final two rounds of 2024 in place of Dennis Hauger, as well as the full 2025 Formula 2 Championship. He qualified fifth in Lusail and finished third in the sprint race after strong tyre management. However, contact with Andrea Kimi Antonelli in the pit lane during the feature race caused a puncture and relegated him to seventeenth. In Yas Marina, Verschoor qualified fourteenth, but recovered to seventh place in the sprint race. He then used an alternate strategy in the feature race to climb through the field, overtaking Martins on the final lap to secure third place. Verschoor ended the season eighth in the standings with 106 points, scoring one victory and six podiums.

==== 2025 ====
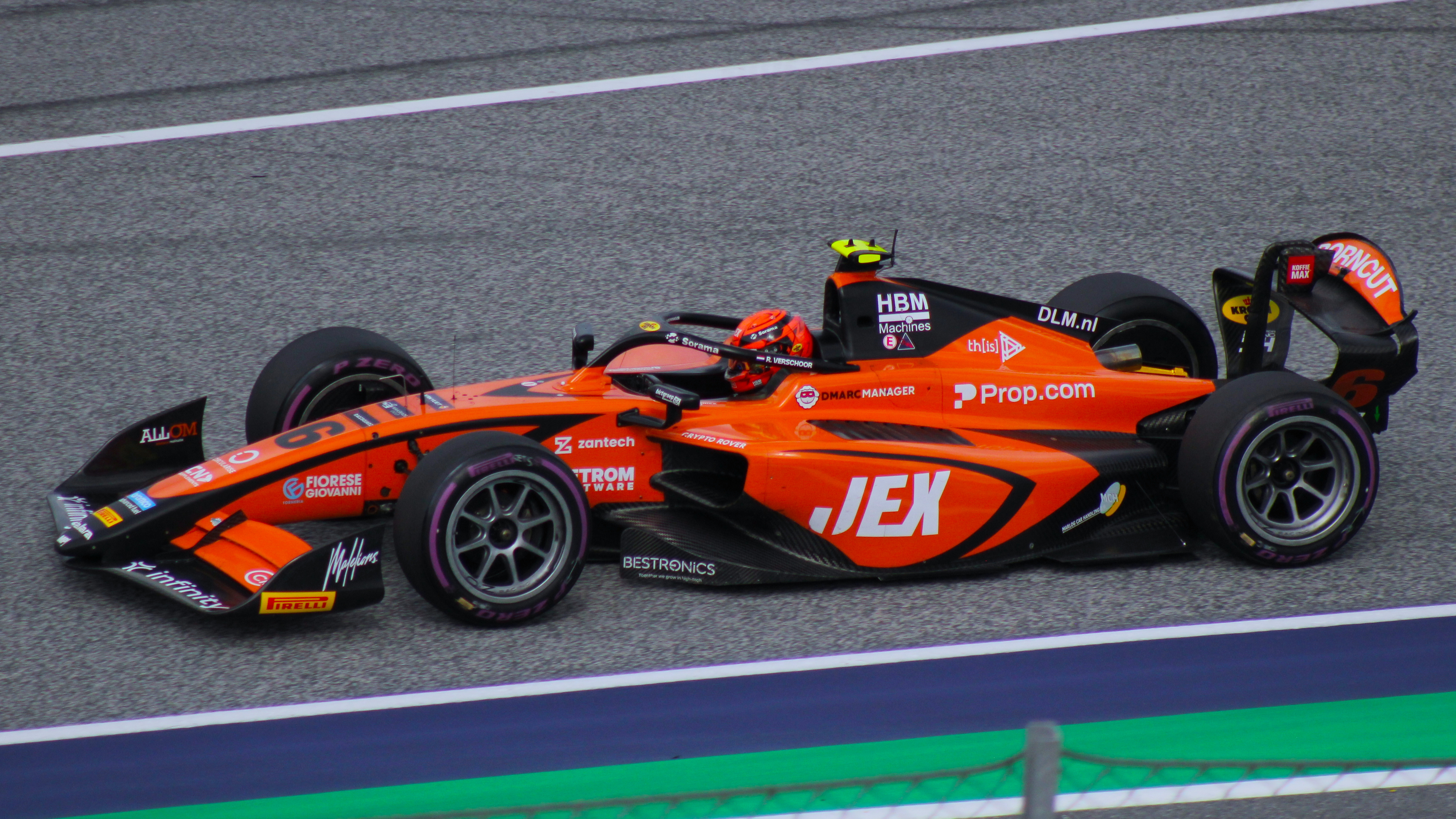
Verschoor driving for MP Motorsport during the 2025 Spielberg Formula 2 round

Verschoor partnered Oliver Goethe at MP Motorsport in 2025 for his fifth season in the category. Ahead of the campaign, he stated that he was "aiming for the championship". He began the season by qualifying fourth in Melbourne and finished in the same position during the sprint race. He was due to start the feature race from the front row following grid penalties for rivals, though the rain was ultimately cancelled due to heavy rain. In Bahrain, Verschoor claimed second place in the sprint race after overtaking Joshua Dürksen on the final lap, before finishing sixth in the feature. In Jeddah, a penalty for Roman Staněk promoted Verschoor to reverse pole in the sprint race after qualifying ninth. Although he led most of the race, a five-second penalty for forcing Pepe Martí off-track dropped him to fourth. He responded in the feature race by using an alternate strategy to move into winning contention before overtaking long-time leader Jak Crawford on the final lap to secure his first victory of the season. The win also gave Verschoor the championship lead for the first time in his Formula 2 career.

A difficult Imola weekend followed, where illness contributed to a lowly qualifying position and he only managed a ninth-place finish in the feature race. In Monaco, Verschoor qualified fourth and finished fifth in the sprint race, but retired from the feature race following a multi-car collision on the opening lap. He returned to form in Barcelona, where a safety car in the sprint race allowed him to switch onto soft tyres and recover from outside the top ten to take victory. He followed this with third place in the feature race after a strong opening lap. In Austria, Verschoor qualified third, finished fourth in the sprint race, and secured the feature race victory after gaining track position during the pit stops and holding off Alex Dunne in the closing laps. The result returned him to the championship lead with a 24-point advantage. He later scored seventh-place finishes in both races in Silverstone.

Verschoor endured his first scoreless weekend of the season in Spa-Francorchamps, which included a high-speed spin at Eau Rouge following contact with Luke Browning on the opening lap. After qualifying eleventh in Budapest, he recovered to sixth in the sprint race and fifth in the feature using an alternate strategy. During the weekend, he also surpassed Ralph Boschung's record for the most Formula 2 starts, making his 121st appearance in the category. Ahead of Monza, MP Motorsport introduced a revised black livery to reduce Verschoor's car's weight after running overweight earlier in the season, though a qualifying crash restricted Verschoor to seventh and eighth-place finishes. He added further points in Baku, before winning the Qatar sprint race from reverse pole despite a poor start. He finished sixth in the feature race. In the Abu Dhabi finale, Verschoor failed to score after qualifying outside the top-ten. He ended the season third in the standings with four victories, six podiums and 170 points, before departing Formula 2 at the conclusion of the campaign after five seasons in the championship.

== Formula E ==
In March 2026, Verschoor made his debut in Formula E machinery with Lola Yamaha ABT during the rookie test at the 2026 Madrid ePrix.

== Formula One ==
In 2016, following his maiden single-seater victory, Verschoor was one of four to be added into the Red Bull Junior Team that year. However, in December 2017, it was announced that Verschoor would cease to be part of Red Bull, the Dutchman stating that "[Red Bull] mainly just added pressure". In 2025, McLaren announced that Verschoor would be signed to their driver development programme.

== Sportscar racing career ==
=== European Le Mans Series ===
==== 2026 ====
In 2026, Verschoor moved to the European Le Mans Series with Duqueine Team, partnering Doriane Pin and Giorgio Roda in the LMP2 Pro-Am category. At the season opener in Barcelona, teammate Roda qualified the car on pole position in class. The No. 30 car in the lead for a majority of Pin's stint, and they were in a battle with the No. 20 Algarve Pro Racing car. Differing strategies between the two teams resulted in the No. 20 having one less pit stop than the No. 30. Verschoor finished the race in second, however, a late ten-second time penalty was given to the No. 30, dropping them down to third.

== Personal life ==
As of July 2022, Verschoor lived in Benschop, Netherlands.

== Karting record ==
=== Karting career summary ===
Season	Series	Team	Position
2011	BNL Karting Series — Minimax		25th
2011	Chrono Dutch Rotax Max Challenge — Minimax		4th
2011–2012	Chrono Rotax Max Winter Cup — Minimax		10th
2012	Chrono Dutch Rotax Max Challenge — Minimax		4th
2013	Rotax International Open — Junior		21st
2013	BNL Karting Series — Rotax Max Junior		10th
2013	SKUSA SuperNationals — Rotax Junior		7th
2013	Chrono Karting Winter Series — Max Junior		10th
2014	Rotax Max Wintercup — Junior	Team TKP	2nd
2014	Rotax Euro Challenge — Junior	Team TKP	2nd
2014	Rotax Max Challenge Central-Eastern Europe — Junior		2nd
2014	CIK-FIA Karting Academy Trophy	Verschoor, Kees	1st
2014	Rotax Max Challenge Grand Finals — Junior		6th
2015	Rotax Max Wintercup — Senior	Team TKP	4th
2015	WSK Champions Cup — KF	RB Racing	2nd
2015	WSK Gold Cup — KF	RB Racing	10th
2015	Andrea Margutti Trophy — KF	RB Racing	19th
2015	WSK Super Master Series — KF	RB Racing	8th
2015	Rotax Max Euro Challenge — Senior	RB Racing	32nd
2015	German Karting Championship — Senior	RB Racing	1st
2015	CIK-FIA European Championship — KF	RB Racing	3rd
2015	CIK-FIA World Championship — KF	RB Racing	6th
2015	WSK Final Cup — KF	RB Racing	2nd
2016	WSK Super Master Series — OK	CRG Keijzer Racing	34th

=== Complete CIK-FIA Academy Trophy results ===
Year	BEL QH	BEL FR	DEU QH	DEU FR	ITA QH	ITA FR	Pos	Points
2014	1	(13)	(7)	2	2	1	1st	64

== Racing record ==
=== Racing career summary ===
Season	Series	Team	Races	Wins	Poles	F/Laps	Podiums	Points	Position
2016	SMP F4 Championship	MP Motorsport	20	11	10	9	16	339	**1st**
2016	F4 Spanish Championship	MP Motorsport	20	17	15	16	19	387	**1st**
2016	V de V Challenge Monoplace	MP Motorsport	3	1	3	1	2	—N/a	NC†
2016	ADAC Formula 4 Championship	Motopark	6	0	0	0	0	34	15th
2016	Italian F4 Championship	Bhaitech Engineering	3	0	0	0	1	31	21st
2017	Formula Renault Eurocup	MP Motorsport	23	0	0	0	1	89	9th
2017	Formula Renault NEC	MP Motorsport	7	1	0	0	3	90	9th
2017	Toyota Racing Series	Giles Motorsport	15	3	0	2	7	843	**3rd**
2018	Formula Renault Eurocup	Josef Kaufmann Racing	12	0	0	0	1	34	13th
2018	Formula Renault NEC	Josef Kaufmann Racing	2	0	0	0	0	—N/a	NC†
2018	GP3 Series	MP Motorsport	8	0	0	0	1	30	15th
2018	Toyota Racing Series	M2 Competition	15	6	4	4	12	911	**2nd**
2019	FIA Formula 3 Championship	MP Motorsport	16	0	0	1	0	34	13th
2019	Macau Grand Prix	MP Motorsport	1	1	0	0	1	—N/a	**1st**
2020	FIA Formula 3 Championship	MP Motorsport	18	0	0	0	1	69	9th
2021	FIA Formula 2 Championship	MP Motorsport	17	1	0	0	1	56	11th
2021	FIA Formula 2 Championship	Charouz Racing System	3	0	0	0	0	56	11th
2022	FIA Formula 2 Championship	Trident	28	1	0	3	4	103	12th
2023	FIA Formula 2 Championship	Van Amersfoort Racing	26	1	0	1	3	108	9th
2023	Macau Grand Prix	Trident	1	0	0	0	0	—N/a	6th
2024	FIA Formula 2 Championship	Trident	24	1	2	1	4	106	8th
2024	FIA Formula 2 Championship	MP Motorsport	4	0	0	2	2	106	8th
2025	FIA Formula 2 Championship	MP Motorsport	27	4	0	3	6	170	**3rd**
2026	European Le Mans Series - LMP2 Pro-Am	Duqueine Team	6	0	3	0	2	67	4th
2026	24 Hours of Le Mans - LMP2	Duqueine Team	1	0	0	0	0	N/A	DNF
2026	Formula One	McLaren Mastercard F1 Team	Development driver						

^{†} As Verschoor was a guest driver, he was ineligible for points.
* Season still in progress.

=== Complete SMP F4 Championship results ===
(key) (Races in bold indicate pole position) (Races in italics indicate fastest lap)

Year	Team	1	2	3	4	5	6	7	8	9	10	11	12	13	14	15	16	17	18	19	20	Pos	Points
2016	MP Motorsport	**SOC**; **1**; 1	SOC; 2 Ret	**ZAN1**; **1**; 2	ZAN1; 2; 7	**ZAN1**; **3**; 12	**ZAN2**; **1**; 2	ZAN2; 2; 4	**ZAN2**; **3**; 1	**MSC1**; **1**; 1	MSC1; 2; 1	**MSC1**; **3**; 1	**MSC2**; **1**; 1	MSC2; 2; 1	**MSC2**; **3**; 1	AND; 1; 1	AND; 2; 1	AND; 3; 1	AHV; 1; 3	AHV; 2; 2	**AHV**; **3**; 2	1st	339

=== Complete F4 Spanish Championship results ===
(key) (Races in bold indicate pole position) (Races in italics indicate fastest lap)

Year	Team	1	2	3	4	5	6	7	8	9	10	11	12	13	14	15	16	17	18	19	20	Pos	Points
2016	MP Motorsport	**NAV**; **1**; 1	NAV; 2; 2	NAV; 3 Ret	ALC; 1; 1	ALC; 2; 1	**ALC**; **3**; 1	**ALG**; **1**; 1	ALG; 2; 1	ALG; 3; 1	**VAL**; **1**; 1	VAL; 2; 1	**VAL**; **3**; 1	**CAT**; **1**; 1	**CAT**; **2**; 2	**JAR**; **1**; 1	JAR; 2; 1	JAR; 3; 1	JER; 1; 1	JER; 2; 1	**JER**; **3**; 1	1st	368

=== Complete V de V Challenge Monoplace results ===
(key) (Races in bold indicate pole position) (Races in italics indicate fastest lap)

Year	Team	1	2	3	4	5	6	7	8	9	10	11	12	13	14	15	16	17	18	19	20	21	DC	Points
2016	MP Motorsport	CAT; 1	CAT; 2	CAT; 3	**BUG**; **1**; 4	**BUG**; **2**; 1	**BUG**; **3**; 3	LEC; 1	LEC; 2	LEC; 3	ALC; 1	ALC; 2	ALC; 3	MUG; 1	MUG; 2	MUG; 3	MAG; 1	MAG; 2	MAG; 3	EST; 1	EST; 2	EST; 3	NC†	0

^{†} As Verschoor was a guest driver, he was ineligible to score points.

=== Complete ADAC Formula 4 Championship results ===
(key) (Races in bold indicate pole position) (Races in italics indicate fastest lap)

Year	Team	1	2	3	4	5	6	7	8	9	10	11	12	13	14	15	16	17	18	19	20	21	22	23	24	Pos	Points
2016	Motopark	OSC1; 1	OSC1; 2	OSC1; 3	SAC; 1	SAC; 2	SAC; 3	LAU; 1	LAU; 2	LAU; 3	OSC2; 1; 12	OSC2; 2; 24	OSC2; 3; 6	RBR; 1	RBR; 2	RBR; 3	NÜR; 1; 7	NÜR; 2; 5	NÜR; 3; 5	ZAN; 1	ZAN; 2	ZAN; 3	HOC; 1	HOC; 2	HOC; 3	15th	34

=== Complete Italian F4 Championship results ===
(key) (Races in bold indicate pole position) (Races in italics indicate fastest lap)

Year	Entrant	1	2	3	4	5	6	7	8	9	10	11	12	13	14	15	16	17	18	19	20	21	22	23	DC	Points
2016	Bhaitech Engineering	MIS; 1	MIS; 2	MIS; 3	MIS; 4	ADR; 1; 6	ADR; 2 DNS	ADR; 3; 3	ADR; 4; 6	IMO1; 1	IMO1; 2	IMO1; 3	MUG; 1	MUG; 2	MUG; 3	VLL; 1	VLL; 2	VLL; 3	IMO2; 1	IMO2; 2	IMO2; 3	MNZ; 1	MNZ; 2	MNZ; 3	21st	31

=== Complete Toyota Racing Series results ===
(key) (Races in bold indicate pole position) (Races in italics indicate fastest lap)

Year	Team	1	2	3	4	5	6	7	8	9	10	11	12	13	14	15	DC	Points
2017	Giles Motorsport	RUA; 1; 3	RUA; 2; 2	RUA; 3; 4	TER; 1; 1	TER; 2; 2	TER; 3; 1	HMP; 1; 4	HMP; 2; 2	HMP; 3; 16	TAU; 1; 8	TAU; 2; 6	TAU; 3; 7	MAN; 1; 4	MAN; 2; 1	MAN; 3; 5	3rd	843
2018	M2 Competition	RUA; 1; 1	RUA; 2; 2	RUA; 3 Ret	TER; 1; 1	TER; 2; 6	TER; 3; 3	**HMP**; **1**; 1	HMP; 2; 5	**HMP**; **3**; 1	TAU; 1; 3	TAU; 2; 3	TAU; 3; 3	**MAN**; **1**; 1	MAN; 2; 3	**MAN**; **3**; 1	2nd	911

=== Complete Formula Renault Northern European Cup results ===
(key) (Races in bold indicate pole position) (Races in italics indicate fastest lap)

Year	Team	1	2	3	4	5	6	7	8	9	10	11	12	DC	Points
2017	MP Motorsport	MNZ; 1	MNZ; 2	ASS; 1; 2	ASS; 2; 1	NÜR; 1	NÜR; 2	SPA; 1; 7	SPA; 2; 12	SPA; 3 Ret	HOC; 1; 3	HOC; 2; 5		9th	90
2018	Josef Kaufmann Racing	PAU; 1	PAU; 2	MNZ; 1	MNZ; 2	SPA; 1; 8	SPA; 2; 10	HUN; 1	HUN; 2	NÜR; 1	NÜR; 2	HOC; 1	HOC; 2	NC†	0

^{†} As Verschoor was a guest driver, he was ineligible to score points.

=== Complete Formula Renault Eurocup results ===
(key) (Races in bold indicate pole position) (Races in italics indicate fastest lap)

Year	Team	1	2	3	4	5	6	7	8	9	10	11	12	13	14	15	16	17	18	19	20	21	22	23	Pos	Points
2017	MP Motorsport	MNZ; 1; 10	MNZ; 2; 7	SIL; 1; 7	SIL; 2; 6	PAU; 1; 13	PAU; 2; 8	MON; 1; 8	MON; 2; 8	HUN; 1 Ret	HUN; 2; 25	HUN; 3; 18	NÜR; 1; 20	NÜR; 2; 14	RBR; 1; 11	RBR; 2; 26	LEC; 1; 4	LEC; 2; 7	SPA; 1; 7	SPA; 2; 12	SPA; 3 Ret	CAT; 1; 5	CAT; 2; 3	CAT; 3; 5	9th	89
2018	Josef Kaufmann Racing	LEC; 1 Ret	LEC; 2; 8	MNZ; 1; 24	MNZ; 2; 9	SIL; 1; 9	SIL; 2; 11	MON; 1; 14	MON; 2; 13	RBR; 1; 2	RBR; 2; 4	SPA; 1; 8	SPA; 2; 10	HUN; 1	HUN; 2	NÜR; 1	NÜR; 2	HOC; 1	HOC; 2	CAT; 1	CAT; 2				13th	34

=== Complete GP3 Series/FIA Formula 3 Championship results ===
(key) (Races in bold indicate pole position) (Races in italics indicate fastest lap)

Year	Entrant	1	2	3	4	5	6	7	8	9	10	11	12	13	14	15	16	17	18	Pos	Points
2018	MP Motorsport	CAT; FEA	CAT; SPR	LEC; FEA	LEC; SPR	RBR; FEA	RBR; SPR	SIL; FEA	SIL; SPR	HUN; FEA	HUN; SPR	SPA; FEA; 17	SPA; SPR; 7	MNZ; FEA; 8	MNZ; SPR; 9	SOC; FEA; 4	SOC; SPR; 3	YMC; FEA; 14	YMC; SPR; 7	15th	30
2019	MP Motorsport	CAT; FEA; 19	CAT; SPR; 19	LEC; FEA; 14	LEC; SPR; 4	RBR; FEA; 10	RBR; SPR; 12	SIL; FEA; 17	SIL; SPR; 21	HUN; FEA; 27†	HUN; SPR; 17	SPA; FEA; 17	SPA; SPR; 11	MNZ; FEA; 4	MNZ; SPR; 4	SOC; FEA; 10	SOC; SPR; 7			13th	34
2020	MP Motorsport	RBR; FEA; 8	RBR; SPR; 2	RBR^{‡} FEA; 7	RBR; SPR; 4	HUN; FEA; 4	HUN; SPR; 5	SIL; FEA; 11	SIL; SPR; 9	SIL; FEA; 19	SIL; SPR; 18	CAT; FEA; 9	CAT; SPR; 4	SPA; FEA; 10	SPA; SPR; 7	MNZ; FEA; 27	MNZ; SPR; 10	MUG; FEA; 12	MUG; SPR; 5	9th	69

^{†} Driver did not finish the race, but was classified as he completed over 90% of the race distance.
^{‡} Half points were awarded, as less than 75% of the scheduled distance was completed.

=== Complete Macau Grand Prix results ===
Year	Team	Car	Qualifying	Quali Race	Main race
2019	(Netherlands) MP Motorsport	Dallara F3 2019	5th	4th	**1st**
2023	(Italy) Trident Motorsport	Dallara F3 2019	12th	12th	6th

=== Complete FIA Formula 2 Championship results ===
(key) (Races in bold indicate pole position) (Races in italics indicate fastest lap)

Year	Entrant	1	2	3	4	5	6	7	8	9	10	11	12	13	14	15	16	17	18	19	20	21	22	23	24	25	26	27	28	DC	Points
2021	MP Motorsport	BHR; SP1; Ret	BHR; SP2; 5	BHR; FEA; 4	MCO; SP1; 13	MCO; SP2; 6	MCO; FEA; 10	BAK; SP1; 12	BAK; SP2; Ret	BAK; FEA; 14	SIL; SP1; 10	SIL; SP2; 1	SIL; FEA; 4	MNZ; SP1; Ret	MNZ; SP2; 13	MNZ; FEA; DSQ	SOC; SP1; 8	SOC; SP2; C	SOC; FEA; 8	JED; SP1	JED; SP2	JED; FEA								11th	56
2021	Charouz Racing System																						YMC; SP1; Ret	YMC; SP2; 11	YMC; FEA; 10					11th	56
2022	Trident	BHR; SPR; 1	BHR; FEA; Ret	JED; SPR; 5	JED; FEA; 2	IMO; SPR; 13	IMO; FEA; 14	CAT; SPR; 11	CAT; FEA; 18	MCO; SPR; 13	MCO; FEA; 12	BAK; SPR; 20†	BAK; FEA; 5	SIL; SPR; 10	SIL; FEA; 14	RBR; SPR; 6	RBR; FEA; DSQ	LEC; SPR; NC	LEC; FEA; 17†	HUN; SPR; 18	HUN; FEA; 8	SPA; SPR; 5	SPA; FEA; 4	ZAN; SPR; 7	ZAN; FEA; 2	MNZ; SPR; 8	MNZ; FEA; 9	YMC; SPR; 2	YMC; FEA; 7	12th	103
2023	Van Amersfoort Racing	BHR; SPR; 22†	BHR; FEA; 5	JED; SPR; 16	JED; FEA; 6	MEL; SPR; 10	MEL; FEA; 7	BAK; SPR; Ret	BAK; FEA; 8	MCO; SPR; 4	MCO; FEA; 4	CAT; SPR; 6	CAT; FEA; 10	RBR; SPR; Ret	RBR; FEA; 1	SIL; SPR; 18	SIL; FEA; 16	HUN; SPR; 13	HUN; FEA; 10	SPA; SPR; DSQ	SPA; FEA; 6	ZAN; SPR; 12	ZAN; FEA; 4	MNZ; SPR; 3	MNZ; FEA; 13	YMC; SPR; 3	YMC; FEA; Ret			9th	108
2024	Trident	BHR; SPR; 10	BHR; FEA; 14	JED; SPR; DSQ	JED; FEA; 8	MEL; SPR; Ret	MEL; FEA; 6	IMO; SPR; 7	IMO; FEA; 10	MON; SPR; 16	**MON**; **FEA**; Ret	CAT; SPR; 13	CAT; FEA; 18†	RBR; SPR; 20	RBR; FEA; Ret	SIL; SPR; 11	SIL; FEA; 13	HUN; SPR; DSQ	HUN; FEA; 3	SPA; SPR; 3	SPA; FEA; 5	MNZ; SPR; 14	MNZ; FEA; 3	BAK; SPR; 17	**BAK**; **FEA**; 1					8th	106
2024	MP Motorsport																									LSL; SPR; 3	LSL; FEA; 17	YMC; SPR; 7	YMC; FEA; 3	8th	106
2025	MP Motorsport	MEL; SPR; 4	MEL; FEA; C	BHR; SPR; 2	BHR; FEA; 6	JED; SPR; 4	JED; FEA; 1	IMO; SPR; 22†	IMO; FEA; 9	MON; SPR; 5	MON; FEA; Ret	CAT; SPR; 1	CAT; FEA; 3	RBR; SPR; 4	RBR; FEA; 1	SIL; SPR; 7	SIL; FEA; 7	SPA; SPR; Ret	SPA; FEA; 18	HUN; SPR; 6	HUN; FEA; 5	MNZ; SPR; 4	MNZ; FEA; 6	BAK; SPR; 6	BAK; FEA; 8	LSL; SPR; 1	LSL; FEA; 6	YMC; SPR; 11	YMC; FEA; 13	3rd	170

=== Complete European Le Mans Series results ===
(key) (Races in bold indicate pole position; results in italics indicate fastest lap)

Year	Entrant	Class	Chassis	Engine	1	2	3	4	5	6	Rank	Points
2026	Duqueine Team	LMP2 Pro-Am	Oreca 07	Gibson GK428 4.2 L V8	**CAT**; 3	LEC; 3	**IMO**; 7	SPA; 5	SIL; 4	ALG; 7	4th	67

=== Complete 24 Hours of Le Mans results ===
Year	Team	Co-Drivers	Car	Class	Laps	Pos.	Class Pos.
2026	(France) Duqueine Team	(France) Julien Andlauer (France) Doriane Pin	Oreca 07-Gibson	LMP2	298	DNF	DNF

== Notes ==
Sporting positions
Preceded by Niko Kari	SMP F4 Championship; Champion; 2016	Succeeded by Christian Lundgaard
Preceded by Inaugural	F4 Spanish Championship; Champion; 2016	Succeeded by Christian Lundgaard
Preceded by Jehan Daruvala	New Zealand Grand Prix; Winner; 2018	Succeeded by Liam Lawson
Preceded by Dan Ticktum	Macau Grand Prix; Winner; 2019	Succeeded by Hon Chio Leong
