= 2018 FIA Formula 3 European Championship =

2018 season of the Formula 3 European Championship

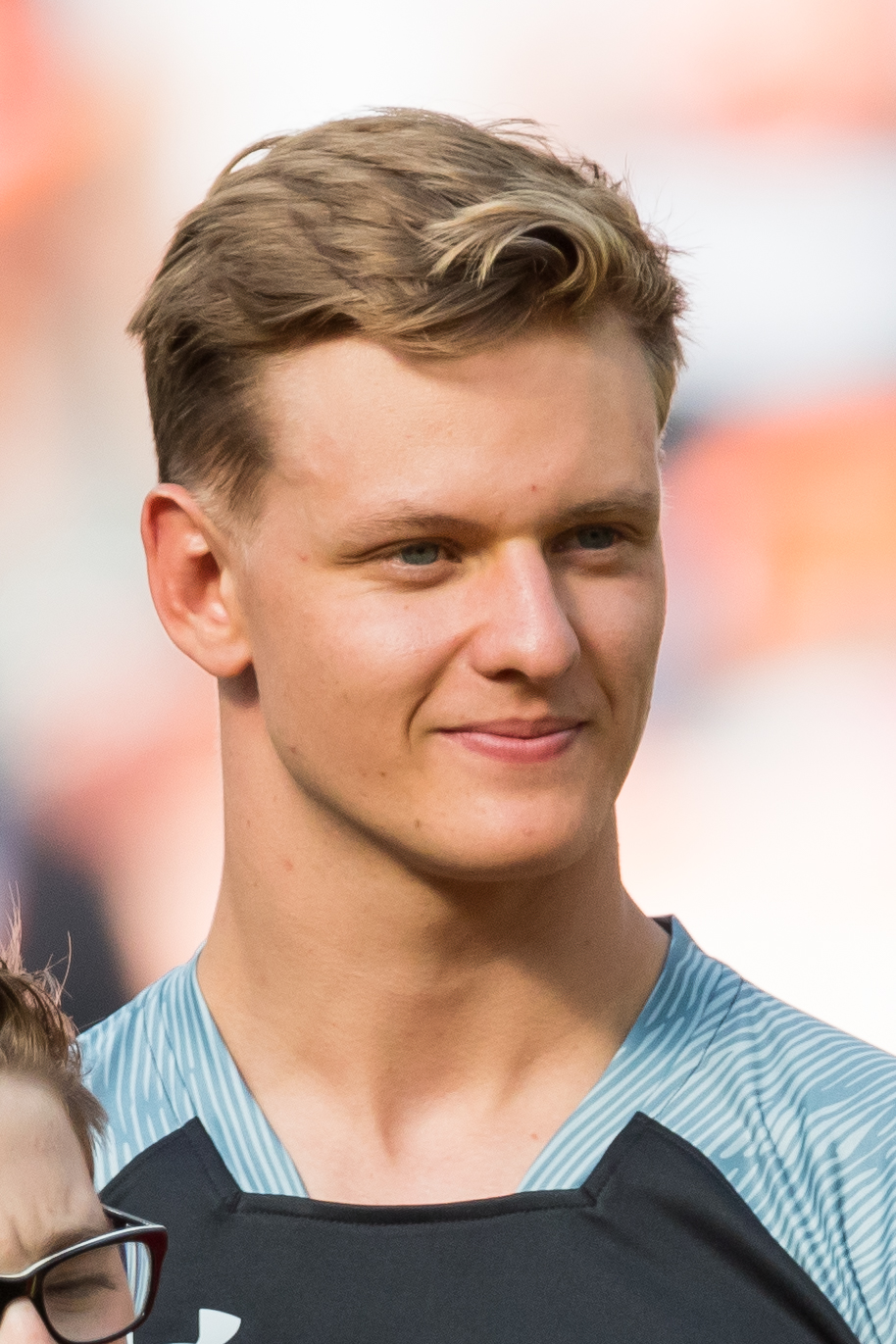
Mick Schumacher won his first junior formulae title after achieving eight victories.

The 2018 FIA Formula 3 European Championship was the seventh and final season of the FIA Formula 3 European Championship, a multi-event motor racing championship for third-tier single-seat open wheel formula racing cars that is held across Europe. The championship features drivers competing in two-litre Formula 3 racing cars which conform to the technical regulations, or formula, for the championship. Teams and drivers competed in ten rounds, running in support of a variety of European motorsport championships including the Deutsche Tourenwagen Masters, Blancpain GT Series Endurance Cup and the FIA World Endurance Championship.

As the FIA Formula 3 European Championship and GP3 Series are merged to form the international FIA Formula 3 Championship in 2019, 2018 was the final year that the championship was run since its formation in 2012.

Mick Schumacher won the championship on his second season. He took the championship lead after win in the first Spielberg race and held it until the second Hockenheim race, where he clinched the title. Dan Ticktum was the championship leader after first Hungaroring race and from finish of the first Silverstone race till the finish of the first Spielberg race but he scored only 42 out of 150 possible points in the final two rounds, losing the title battle by 59 points. Robert Shwartzman won the rookies' championship and completed the top-three in the driver's standings ahead of another Ferrari Driver Academy members Marcus Armstrong and Guanyu Zhou. Armstrong was placed behind Jüri Vips in both Drivers' and Rookies' standings. While fellow Estonian driver Ralf Aron was behind Armstrong in the driver standings. Prema Theodore Racing successfully defended the teams' championship title, winning over Motopark with one round to spare, and maintaining their record of being the only team to have won the teams' championship since the FIA Formula 3 European Championship was launched in 2012.

Champion Mick Schumacher took eight wins: one each at Spa-Francorchamps, Silverstone, and Misano, a hat-trick at the Nürburgring, and a double at the Red Bull Ring. Runner-up Dan Ticktum, Jüri Vips, and Ralf Aron each took four race wins. Guanyu Zhou, Enaam Ahmed, and Robert Shwartzman won two races. Marcus Armstrong, Sacha Fenestraz, Jehan Daruvala, and Nikita Troitskiy were also race-winners.

== Entries ==
The following teams and drivers are currently competing in the 2018 championship:

Team	Chassis (Note: All drivers competed in Dallara chassis; model listed.)	Engine	No.	Driver	Status	Rounds
(Italy) Prema Theodore Racing	F315/004	Mercedes-Benz	1	(China) Guanyu Zhou		All
(Italy) Prema Theodore Racing	F318/002	Mercedes-Benz	4	(Germany) Mick Schumacher		All
(Italy) Prema Theodore Racing	F317/004	Mercedes-Benz	7	(Estonia) Ralf Aron		All
(Italy) Prema Theodore Racing	F317/003	Mercedes-Benz	8	(Italy) Marcus Armstrong (Note: Armstrong is a New Zealand driver who raced under an Italian racing licence.)	R	All
(Italy) Prema Theodore Racing	F314/015	Mercedes-Benz	10	(Russia) Robert Shwartzman	R	All
(Germany) Motopark	F318/006 (Note: Used F314/006 chassis at rounds 1–6)	Volkswagen	3	(Spain) Sebastián Fernández (Note: Fernández is a Venezuelan driver who raced under a Spanish racing licence.)	R	All
(Germany) Motopark	F316/012	Volkswagen	13	(Switzerland) Fabio Scherer	R	All
(Germany) Motopark	F315/007	Volkswagen	23	(South Africa) Jonathan Aberdein	R	All
(Germany) Motopark	F318/007	Volkswagen	27	(United Kingdom) Dan Ticktum		All
(Germany) Motopark	F314/018	Volkswagen	33	(San Marino) Marino Sato (Note: Sato is a Japanese driver who raced under a Sammarinese racing licence.)		All
(Germany) Motopark	F315/003	Volkswagen	44	(Estonia) Jüri Vips	R	All
(United Kingdom) Fortec Motorsports	F318/007 (Note: Used F317/012 chassis at round 2)	Mercedes-Benz	5	(Romania) Petru Florescu	R	2–7
(United Kingdom) Carlin	F312/010 (Note: Used F315/001 chassis at roundы 1-9)	Volkswagen	9	(India) Jehan Daruvala		All
(United Kingdom) Carlin	F317/001	Volkswagen	11	(France) Sacha Fenestraz	R	All
(United Kingdom) Carlin	F315/016	Volkswagen	16	(Russia) Nikita Troitskiy	R	All
(United Kingdom) Carlin	F312/004	Volkswagen	17	(Canada) Devlin DeFrancesco		1–4
(United Kingdom) Carlin	F312/004	Volkswagen	17	(Germany) Julian Hanses	R	9–10
(United Kingdom) Carlin	F312/002 (Note: Used F316/014 chassis at rounds 1–3)	Volkswagen	24	(India) Ameya Vaidyanathan (Note: Vaidyanathan raced under a British racing licence at rounds 1–3.)	R	All
(United Kingdom) Carlin	F317/020	Volkswagen	62	(Austria) Ferdinand Habsburg		All
(Netherlands) Van Amersfoort Racing	F316/017	Mercedes-Benz	12	(Russia) Artem Petrov	R	All
(Netherlands) Van Amersfoort Racing	F317/018	Mercedes-Benz	15	(Iran) Keyvan Andres (Note: Andres is a German-Iranian driver who raced under an Iranian racing licence.)		All
(Netherlands) Van Amersfoort Racing	F316/001	Mercedes-Benz	25	(Germany) Sophia Flörsch	R	4–10
(Netherlands) Van Amersfoort Racing	F316/010	Mercedes-Benz	30	(Denmark) Frederik Vesti	R	10
(Germany) ma-con	F312/019 (Note: Used F312/045 chassis at round 3)	Volkswagen	18	(Germany) Julian Hanses	R	1–6
(United Kingdom) Hitech Bullfrog GP	F316/018 (Note: Used F315/009 chassis at rounds 1–3)	Mercedes-Benz	39	(Spain) Álex Palou		All
(United Kingdom) Hitech Bullfrog GP	F315/009 (Note: Used F315/011 chassis at rounds 1-9)	Mercedes-Benz	65	(United Kingdom) Enaam Ahmed	R	All
(United Kingdom) Hitech Bullfrog GP	F317/011	Mercedes-Benz	66	(Macau) Charles Leong	R	6
(United Kingdom) Hitech Bullfrog GP	F315/011 (Note: Used F316/019 chassis at rounds 1–4, F316/022 chassis at rounds 5-9)	Mercedes-Benz	77	(United Kingdom) Ben Hingeley	R	All

Icon	Meaning
R	Rookie Cup

=== Team changes ===
- ma-con and Fortec Motorsports, which have previously competed until the 2013 and 2015 seasons made their comeback to the championship after a four-year and two-year hiatus respectively.

=== Driver changes ===
- Italian F4 champion Marcus Armstrong made his Formula 3 debut with Prema Powerteam. He is partnered by Robert Shwartzman, who finished third in the 2017 Eurocup Formula Renault 2.0. Callum Ilott, who raced for the team in 2017, moved to the GP3 Series. After a season with Hitech GP, Ralf Aron returned to Prema. Maximilian Günther, who finished third in 2017, stepped up to FIA Formula 2 Championship, leaving his Prema seat vacant.
- Fabio Scherer and Jonathan Aberdein, who finished fifth and ninth respectively in the 2017 ADAC Formula 4 Championship, moved up to the series with Motopark. They are joined by 2017 Italian F4 Championship driver Sebastián Fernández, 2017 Macau Grand Prix winner Dan Ticktum and 2017 ADAC Formula 4 champion Jüri Vips. David Beckmann, who raced with the team switched to GP3 Series. Joel Eriksson received 2018 Deutsche Tourenwagen Masters drive with BMW, leaving his Motopark seat vacant.
- After competing in the selected rounds of the 2017 championship, Devlin DeFrancesco and Ameya Vaidyanathan made their full-time switch to European F3 with Carlin from Euroformula Open. 2017 Eurocup Formula Renault 2.0 champion Sacha Fenestraz, who have competed Nürburgring round for Carlin in 2017 also made the full-time switch. They are joined by 2017 Euroformula Open Championship runner-up Nikita Troitskiy. Reigning champion Lando Norris graduated to the FIA Formula 2 Championship, leaving his Carlin seat vacant.
- Keyvan Andres switched from Motopark to Van Amersfoort Racing. He is joined by Italian F4 Championship graduate Artem Petrov. Harrison Newey left the team and the championship, moving to sports car racing with Rebellion Racing in the 2018 European Le Mans Series. Joey Mawson and Pedro Piquet left the team and the championship to join Arden International and Trident respectively in the GP3 Series.
- Julian Hanses, who finished eleventh in the 2017 ADAC Formula 4 Championship is scheduled to graduate with series returnees ma-con, after missing three rounds he returned with Carlin at Spielberg.
- BRDC British Formula 3 champion Enaam Ahmed and his rival Ben Hingeley moved to European Formula 3, joining Hitech GP. They are joined by Álex Palou, who finished third in the 2017 All-Japan Formula Three Championship. Nikita Mazepin left Hitech after two consecutive seasons to join ART Grand Prix in the GP3 Series. Tadasuke Makino also left the team to join the FIA Formula 2 Championship.

Midseason changes

- Petru Florescu, who raced with Motopark in 2017, returned to the championship with Fortec Motorsports.
- Sophia Flörsch stepped up from ADAC Formula 4, joining Van Amersfoort Racing from round 4 onwards.
- China Formula 4 champion Charles Leong made his FIA F3 European Championship debut at Silverstone with Hitech Bullfrog GP.

== Calendar ==
The following ten rounds are being contested as part of the 2018 championship:

Round	Circuit	Race 1	Race 2	Race 3	Supporting
1	(France) Circuit de Pau-Ville, Pau	12 May	13 May	13 May	stand-alone event
2	(Hungary) Hungaroring, Mogyoród	2 June	3 June	3 June	Deutsche Tourenwagen Masters
3	(Germany) Norisring, Nuremberg	23 June	24 June	24 June	Deutsche Tourenwagen Masters
4	(Netherlands) Circuit Zandvoort, Zandvoort	14 July	14 July	15 July	Deutsche Tourenwagen Masters
5	(Belgium) Circuit de Spa-Francorchamps, Francorchamps	27 July	27 July	28 July	Blancpain GT Series Endurance Cup
6	(United Kingdom) Silverstone Circuit, Silverstone	18 August	18 August	19 August	FIA World Endurance Championship
7	(Italy) Misano World Circuit Marco Simoncelli, Misano Adriatico	25 August	26 August	26 August	Deutsche Tourenwagen Masters
8	(Germany) Nürburgring, Rhineland-Palatinate	8 September	9 September	9 September	Deutsche Tourenwagen Masters
9	(Austria) Red Bull Ring, Spielberg	22 September	23 September	23 September	Deutsche Tourenwagen Masters
10	(Germany) Hockenheimring, Baden-Württemberg	13 October	13 October	14 October	Deutsche Tourenwagen Masters

=== Calendar changes ===
The round at the Autodromo Nazionale Monza was replaced by a new round at Misano World Circuit Marco Simoncelli as the series continues to support the Deutsche Tourenwagen Masters. The Pau Grand Prix replaced Monza as the opening round of the championship, with the Silverstone round held later in the season.

== Results and standings ==
=== Season summary ===
Round		Circuit	Pole position	Fastest lap	Winning driver	Winning team	Rookie winner	Report
1	R1	(France) Circuit de Pau-Ville	(United Kingdom) Dan Ticktum	(Estonia) Ralf Aron	(China) Guanyu Zhou	(Italy) Prema Theodore Racing	(France) Sacha Fenestraz	Report
1	R2	(France) Circuit de Pau-Ville	(France) Sacha Fenestraz	(France) Sacha Fenestraz	(France) Sacha Fenestraz	(United Kingdom) Carlin	(France) Sacha Fenestraz	Report
1	R3	(France) Circuit de Pau-Ville	(United Kingdom) Enaam Ahmed	(Estonia) Ralf Aron	(Estonia) Ralf Aron	(Italy) Prema Theodore Racing	(United Kingdom) Enaam Ahmed	Report
2	R1	(Hungary) Hungaroring	(United Kingdom) Dan Ticktum	(Austria) Ferdinand Habsburg	(United Kingdom) Dan Ticktum	(Germany) Motopark	(Russia) Robert Shwartzman	Report
2	R2	(Hungary) Hungaroring	(United Kingdom) Dan Ticktum	(Russia) Nikita Troitskiy	(United Kingdom) Enaam Ahmed	(United Kingdom) Hitech Bullfrog GP	(United Kingdom) Enaam Ahmed	Report
2	R3	(Hungary) Hungaroring	(United Kingdom) Enaam Ahmed	(Spain) Álex Palou	(United Kingdom) Enaam Ahmed	(United Kingdom) Hitech Bullfrog GP	(United Kingdom) Enaam Ahmed	Report
3	R1	(Germany) Norisring	(Italy) Marcus Armstrong	(Austria) Ferdinand Habsburg	(Italy) Marcus Armstrong	(Italy) Prema Theodore Racing	(Italy) Marcus Armstrong	Report
3	R2	(Germany) Norisring	(Russia) Robert Shwartzman	(Estonia) Jüri Vips	(Estonia) Jüri Vips	(Germany) Motopark	(Estonia) Jüri Vips	Report
3	R3	(Germany) Norisring	(Italy) Marcus Armstrong	(Switzerland) Fabio Scherer	(United Kingdom) Dan Ticktum	(Germany) Motopark	(Estonia) Jüri Vips	Report
4	R1	(Netherlands) Circuit Zandvoort	(China) Guanyu Zhou	(Italy) Marcus Armstrong	(Estonia) Ralf Aron	(Italy) Prema Theodore Racing	(Italy) Marcus Armstrong	Report
4	R2	(Netherlands) Circuit Zandvoort	(United Kingdom) Dan Ticktum	(Italy) Marcus Armstrong	(Estonia) Ralf Aron	(Italy) Prema Theodore Racing	(Italy) Marcus Armstrong	Report
4	R3	(Netherlands) Circuit Zandvoort	(United Kingdom) Dan Ticktum	(Russia) Nikita Troitskiy	(Russia) Nikita Troitskiy	(United Kingdom) Carlin	(Russia) Nikita Troitskiy	Report
5	R1	(Belgium) Circuit de Spa-Francorchamps	(India) Jehan Daruvala	(India) Jehan Daruvala	(India) Jehan Daruvala	(United Kingdom) Carlin	(Russia) Robert Shwartzman	Report
5	R2	(Belgium) Circuit de Spa-Francorchamps	(Germany) Mick Schumacher	(South Africa) Jonathan Aberdein	(United Kingdom) Dan Ticktum	(Germany) Motopark	(Switzerland) Fabio Scherer	Report
5	R3	(Belgium) Circuit de Spa-Francorchamps	(China) Guanyu Zhou	(Switzerland) Fabio Scherer	(Germany) Mick Schumacher	(Italy) Prema Theodore Racing	(Russia) Robert Shwartzman	Report
6	R1	(United Kingdom) Silverstone Circuit	(France) Sacha Fenestraz	(United Kingdom) Dan Ticktum	(United Kingdom) Dan Ticktum	(Germany) Motopark	(France) Sacha Fenestraz	Report
6	R2	(United Kingdom) Silverstone Circuit	(Switzerland) Fabio Scherer	(Germany) Mick Schumacher	(Germany) Mick Schumacher	(Italy) Prema Theodore Racing	(Estonia) Jüri Vips	Report
6	R3	(United Kingdom) Silverstone Circuit	(Estonia) Jüri Vips	(Estonia) Jüri Vips	(Estonia) Jüri Vips	(Germany) Motopark	(Estonia) Jüri Vips	Report
7	R1	(Italy) Misano World Circuit Marco Simoncelli	(Germany) Mick Schumacher	(Estonia) Jüri Vips	(Germany) Mick Schumacher	(Italy) Prema Theodore Racing	(Italy) Marcus Armstrong	Report
7	R2	(Italy) Misano World Circuit Marco Simoncelli	(Estonia) Jüri Vips	(United Kingdom) Enaam Ahmed	(Estonia) Jüri Vips	(Germany) Motopark	(Estonia) Jüri Vips	Report
7	R3	(Italy) Misano World Circuit Marco Simoncelli	(Italy) Marcus Armstrong	(Estonia) Jüri Vips	(Estonia) Ralf Aron	(Italy) Prema Theodore Racing	(Estonia) Jüri Vips	Report
8	R1	(Germany) Nürburgring	(Russia) Robert Shwartzman	(Germany) Mick Schumacher	(Germany) Mick Schumacher	(Italy) Prema Theodore Racing	(Russia) Robert Shwartzman	Report
8	R2	(Germany) Nürburgring	(Germany) Mick Schumacher	(Germany) Mick Schumacher	(Germany) Mick Schumacher	(Italy) Prema Theodore Racing	(Russia) Robert Shwartzman	Report
8	R3	(Germany) Nürburgring	(Germany) Mick Schumacher	(Spain) Álex Palou	(Germany) Mick Schumacher	(Italy) Prema Theodore Racing	(Russia) Robert Shwartzman	Report
9	R1	(Austria) Red Bull Ring	(Germany) Mick Schumacher	(Italy) Marcus Armstrong	(Germany) Mick Schumacher	(Italy) Prema Theodore Racing	(Russia) Robert Shwartzman	Report
9	R2	(Austria) Red Bull Ring	(Germany) Mick Schumacher	(Germany) Mick Schumacher	(Germany) Mick Schumacher	(Italy) Prema Theodore Racing	(Italy) Marcus Armstrong	Report
9	R3	(Austria) Red Bull Ring	(Germany) Mick Schumacher	(Russia) Robert Shwartzman	(Russia) Robert Shwartzman	(Italy) Prema Theodore Racing	(Russia) Robert Shwartzman	Report
10	R1	(Germany) Hockenheimring	(China) Guanyu Zhou	(China) Guanyu Zhou	(China) Guanyu Zhou	(Italy) Prema Theodore Racing	(Russia) Robert Shwartzman	Report
10	R2	(Germany) Hockenheimring	(Estonia) Jüri Vips	(Estonia) Jüri Vips	(Estonia) Jüri Vips	(Germany) Motopark	(Estonia) Jüri Vips	Report
10	R3	(Germany) Hockenheimring	(Russia) Robert Shwartzman	(Estonia) Jüri Vips	(Russia) Robert Shwartzman	(Italy) Prema Theodore Racing	(Russia) Robert Shwartzman	Report

=== Scoring system ===
Points are awarded to the top ten drivers. Guest drivers are not eligible to score points.

Position	**1st**	**2nd**	**3rd**	**4th**	**5th**	**6th**	**7th**	**8th**	**9th**	**10th**
Points	25	18	15	12	10	8	6	4	2	1

In order for the full points score to be awarded, the race must run for at least twenty-five minutes. In the event that less than twenty-five minutes elapse, half points are awarded.

=== Drivers' championship ===
Pos.	Driver	PAU (Note: The third race at Pau was red-flagged after eleven laps were completed. As less than 25 minutes of the race had passed at the time of suspension, the race paid half points to all classified finishers.) (France)			HUN (Hungary)			NOR (Germany)			ZAN (Netherlands)			SPA (Belgium)			SIL (United Kingdom)			MIS (Italy)			NÜR (Germany)			RBR (Austria)			HOC (Germany)			Points
Pos.	Driver	R1	R2	R3	R1	R2	R3	R1	R2	R3	R1	R2	R3	R1	R2	R3	R1	R2	R3	R1	R2	R3	R1	R2	R3	R1	R2	R3	R1	R2	R3	Points
1	(Germany) Mick Schumacher	15	10	7	4	7	3	5	9	15	3	Ret	13	4	**Ret**	1	Ret	1	5	**1**	3	5	1	**1**	**1**	**1**	**1**	**2**	12	2	2	365
2	(United Kingdom) Dan Ticktum	**3**	Ret	5	**1**	**Ret**	2	4	Ret	1	5	**6**	**Ret**	13	1	5	1	8	6	6	4	4	3	3	4	8	17†	4	5	7	4	308
3	(Russia) Robert Shwartzman	8	9	6	3	5	Ret	6	**Ret**	7	8	7	11	5	4	2	8	9	10	3	9	7	**2**	2	2	2	3	1	2	5	**1**	294
4	(Estonia) Jüri Vips	10	17	12	6	18	4	7	1	2	6	8	15	6	Ret	4	4	2	**1**	5	**1**	2	Ret	18	6	6	4	8	3	**1**	9	284
5	(New Zealand) Marcus Armstrong	5	3	Ret	Ret	2	Ret	**1**	2	**3**	4	2	16	Ret	6	3	6	5	Ret	2	13	**Ret**	6	4	5	4	2	5	Ret	Ret	Ret	260
6	(Estonia) Ralf Aron	2	8	1	5	12	7	2	13	6	1	1	14	3	Ret	14	Ret	10	Ret	7	5	1	5	5	8	23	5	9	6	3	15	242.5
7	(Spain) Álex Palou	7	2	19	12	3	Ret	11	4	Ret	10	4	6	2	11	9	7	11	7	8	2	6	Ret	6	3	3	Ret	10	4	8	3	204
8	(China) Guanyu Zhou	1	12	13	2	4	5	9	12	4	**2**	3	2	Ret	Ret	**13**	Ret	6	8	4	11	Ret	7	8	10	12	9	11	**1**	10	5	203
9	(United Kingdom) Enaam Ahmed	6	5	**2**	7	1	**1**	14	15	8	16	Ret	10	19	5	6	3	4	4	21	6	10	4	Ret	9	22	11	18	9	Ret	8	174
10	(India) Jehan Daruvala	Ret	6	3	13	6	11	3	6	5	12	Ret	3	**1**	3	11	9	15	12	9	Ret	9	Ret	14	13	10	18†	7	Ret	4	Ret	136.5
11	(France) Sacha Fenestraz	4	**1**	20	8	9	6	Ret	8	Ret	17	12	18	11	7	15	**2**	7	2	11	8	12	12	9	7	11	16†	Ret	7	Ret	Ret	121
12	(South Africa) Jonathan Aberdein	12	19	8	17	14	8	16	14	Ret	7	11	8	Ret	9	7	5	3	3	10	14	11	9	7	12	7	6	3	16	11	7	108
13	(Austria) Ferdinand Habsburg	17	11	Ret	Ret	8	15	18	5	9	14	5	7	Ret	10	12	13	13	9	12	7	3	Ret	10	11	5	8	6	Ret	12	6	87
14	(Switzerland) Fabio Scherer	11	Ret	4	10	11	10	19	10	16	13	9	5	9	2	10	10	**Ret**	11	14	10	8	Ret	11	14	9	7	12	Ret	6	11	64
15	(Russia) Nikita Troitskiy	14	13	11	11	20	9	22	11	Ret	11	13	1	Ret	8	24	14	Ret	15	18	21	14	13	16	19	16	Ret	17	8	9	21	37
16	(Japan) Marino Sato	9	18	10	15	13	16	8	7	13	19	10	4	7	15	16	12	17	14	15	12	Ret	Ret	Ret	18	14	13	21	19	14	16	31.5
17	(United Kingdom) Ben Hingeley	Ret	4	9	9	10	Ret	12	16	Ret	9	Ret	Ret	18	14	17	11	12	19	22	16	13	8	Ret	20	13	12	20	14	13	19	22
18	(Iran) Keyvan Andres	Ret	14	14	16	15	13	10	3	Ret	20	18	17	10	12	20	16	18	16	19	18	17	10	12	15	18	Ret	13	17	17	20	18
19	(Germany) Julian Hanses	13	7	18	Ret	21	20	20	17	12	21	16	Ret	17	18	23	WD	WD	WD							20	14	19	11	Ret	13	7
20	(Russia) Artem Petrov	16	Ret	15	20	23	17	13	18	11	15	15	9	8	Ret	18	Ret	16	13	13	17	15	15	13	17	21	Ret	14	13	16	10	7
21	(Spain) Sebastián Fernández	Ret	15	17	14	19	12	15	20	10	18	14	12	14	13	8	15	14	Ret	17	15	Ret	11	Ret	16	15	Ret	16	18	15	12	5
22	(Germany) Sophia Flörsch										23	17	19	16	17	21	18	19	17	16	19	18	Ret	15	21	17	10	15	15	19	18	1
23	(India) Ameya Vaidyanathan	Ret	16	16	19	17	18	17	DSQ	EX	22	Ret	20	12	16	22	17	21	18	20	20	16	14	17	Ret	19	15	22	20	18	17	0
24	(Romania) Petru Florescu				21	22	19	21	19	14	24	19	21	15	Ret	19	20	20	21	WD	WD	WD										0
25	(Canada) Devlin DeFrancesco	Ret	Ret	Ret	18	16	14	WD	WD	WD	WD	WD	WD																			0
26	(Macau) Charles Leong																19	22	20													0
Guest drivers ineligible to score points
	(Denmark) Frederik Vesti																												10	20	14	0
Pos.	Driver	R1	R2	R3	R1	R2	R3	R1	R2	R3	R1	R2	R3	R1	R2	R3	R1	R2	R3	R1	R2	R3	R1	R2	R3	R1	R2	R3	R1	R2	R3	Points
Pos.	Driver	PAU (France)			HUN (Hungary)			NOR (Germany)			ZAN (Netherlands)			SPA (Belgium)			SIL (United Kingdom)			MIS (Italy)			NÜR (Germany)			RBR (Austria)			HOC (Germany)			Points

Colour	Result
Gold	Winner
Silver	Second place
Bronze	Third place
Green	Points classification
Blue	Non-points classification
Blue	Non-classified finish (NC)
Purple	Retired, not classified (Ret)
Red	Did not qualify (DNQ)
Red	Did not pre-qualify (DNPQ)
Black	Disqualified (DSQ)
White	Did not start (DNS)
White	Withdrew (WD)
White	Race cancelled (C)
Blank	Did not practice (DNP)
Blank	Did not arrive (DNA)
Blank	Excluded (EX)

**Bold** – Pole
Italics – Fastest Lap

Notes:

- † — Drivers did not finish the race, but were classified as they completed over 90% of the race distance.

=== Rookies' championship ===
Pos.	Driver	PAU (France)			HUN (Hungary)			NOR (Germany)			ZAN (Netherlands)			SPA (Belgium)			SIL (United Kingdom)			MIS (Italy)			NÜR (Germany)			RBR (Austria)			HOC (Germany)			Points
Pos.	Driver	R1	R2	R3	R1	R2	R3	R1	R2	R3	R1	R2	R3	R1	R2	R3	R1	R2	R3	R1	R2	R3	R1	R2	R3	R1	R2	R3	R1	R2	R3	Points
1	(Russia) Robert Shwartzman	4	6	3	1	3	Ret	2	Ret	3	4	2	6	1	2	1	6	6	5	2	4	2	1	1	1	1	2	1	1	2	1	491.5
2	(Estonia) Jüri Vips	5	10	7	2	9	2	3	1	1	2	3	8	2	Ret	3	3	1	1	3	1	1	Ret	10	3	3	3	4	2	1	4	430
3	(Italy) Marcus Armstrong	2	2	Ret	Ret	2	Ret	1	2	2	1	1	9	Ret	4	2	5	4	Ret	1	6	Ret	3	2	2	2	1	3	Ret	Ret	Ret	361
4	(United Kingdom) Enaam Ahmed	3	4	1	3	1	1	6	7	4	9	Ret	5	12	3	4	2	3	4	12	2	4	2	Ret	5	14	7	10	5	Ret	3	304.5
5	(France) Sacha Fenestraz	1	1	12	4	4	3	Ret	3	Ret	10	6	10	5	5	8	1	5	2	5	3	6	7	4	4	6	11†	Ret	3	Ret	Ret	277
6	(South Africa) Jonathan Aberdein	7	11	4	9	7	4	8	6	Ret	3	5	3	Ret	7	5	4	2	3	4	7	5	5	3	6	4	4	2	11	5	2	277
7	(Switzerland) Fabio Scherer	6	Ret	2	6	6	6	10	4	9	7	4	2	4	1	7	7	Ret	6	7	5	3	Ret	5	7	5	5	5	Ret	3	6	249
8	(Russia) Nikita Troitskiy	9	7	6	7	11	5	13	5	Ret	6	7	1	DNS	6	15	9	Ret	8	10	13	8	8	8	10	9	Ret	9	4	4	13	133
9	(United Kingdom) Ben Hingeley	Ret	3	5	5	5	Ret	4	8	Ret	5	Ret	Ret	11	9	9	8	7	11	13	9	7	4	Ret	11	7	8	12	9	6	12	122
10	(Russia) Artem Petrov	10	Ret	8	11	14	8	5	10	6	8	9	4	3	Ret	10	Ret	9	7	6	10	9	10	6	9	13	Ret	6	8	8	5	118
11	(Spain) Sebastián Fernández	Ret	8	10	8	10	7	7	12	5	11	8	7	7	8	6	10	8	Ret	9	8	Ret	6	Ret	8	8	Ret	8	12	7	7	102.5
12	(Germany) Julian Hanses	8	5	11	Ret	12	11	11	9	7	12	10	Ret	10	12	14	WD	WD	WD							12	9	11	7	Ret	8	38
13	(Germany) Sophia Flörsch										14	11	11	9	11	12	12	10	9	8	11	11	Ret	7	12	10	6	7	10	10	11	34
14	(India) Ameya Vaidyanathan	Ret	9	9	10	8	9	9	DSQ	EX	13	Ret	12	6	10	13	11	12	10	11	12	10	9	9	Ret	11	10	13	13	9	10	32
15	(Romania) Petru Florescu				12	13	10	12	11	8	15	12	13	8	Ret	11	13	11	13	WD	WD	WD										9
Guest drivers ineligible to score points
	(Denmark) Frederik Vesti																												6	11	9	0
Pos.	Driver	R1	R2	R3	R1	R2	R3	R1	R2	R3	R1	R2	R3	R1	R2	R3	R1	R2	R3	R1	R2	R3	R1	R2	R3	R1	R2	R3	R1	R2	R3	Points
Pos.	Driver	PAU (France)			HUN (Hungary)			NOR (Germany)			ZAN (Netherlands)			SPA (Belgium)			SIL (United Kingdom)			MIS (Italy)			NÜR (Germany)			RBR (Austria)			HOC (Germany)			Points

Notes:

- † — Drivers did not finish the race, but were classified as they completed over 90% of the race distance.

=== Teams' championship ===
Points for the team classification solely are awarded to two best finishing cars of each team, omitting the other cars from the classification of the race.

Pos.	Team	Points
1	(Italy) Prema Theodore Racing	1003.5
2	(Germany) Motopark	789
3	(United Kingdom) Hitech Bullfrog GP	518
4	(United Kingdom) Carlin	503.5
5	(Netherlands) Van Amersfoort Racing	141.5
6	(Germany) ma-con	18
7	(United Kingdom) Fortec	4
