= Dan Ticktum =

British racing driver (born 1999)

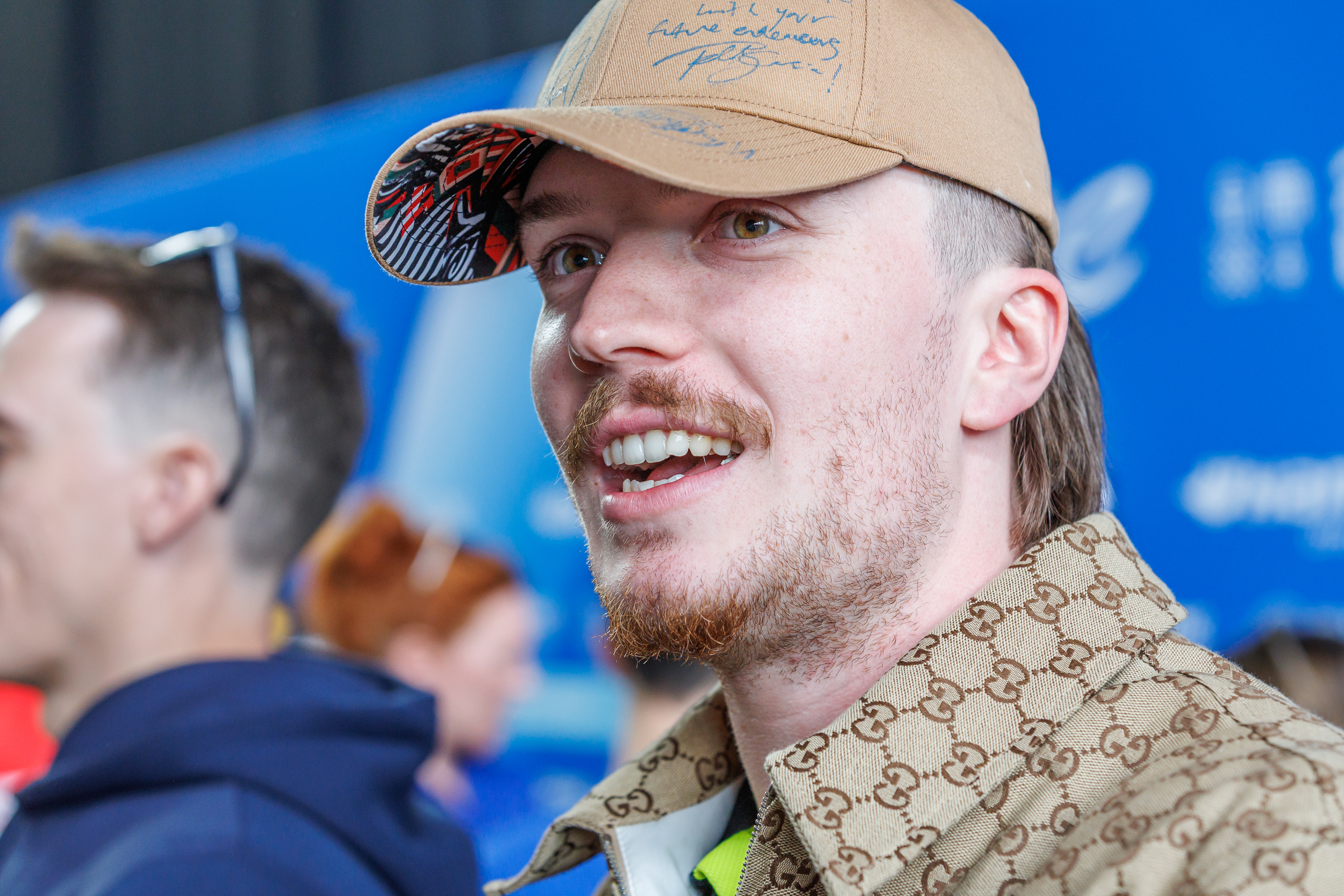
- Ticktum at the 2025 Berlin ePrix
- Born: Daniel Charles Anthony Ticktum; 8 June 1999 (age 27); London, England
- Nationality: (United Kingdom) British

Formula E career
- Debut season: 2021–22
- Current team: Fortescue Zero Racing
- Car number: 30
- Former teams: Cupra Kiro
- Starts: 81
- Championships: 0
- Wins: 2
- Podiums: 3
- Poles: 3
- Fastest laps: 3
- Finished last season: 15th (62 pts)
- Statistics up to date as of 16 August 2026.

Previous series
- 2018–2021 (Note: The exact years Ticktum competed in FIA Formula 2: 2018, 2020–2021.); 2019; 2019; 2016, 2018; 2017; 2015, 2017; 2015, 2017; 2016; 2015: FIA Formula 2; FR European; Super Formula; FIA F3 European; GP3 Series; Formula Renault Eurocup; Formula Renault NEC; British F3 Autumn; MSA Formula

Championship titles
- 2017–2018: Macau Grand Prix

Awards
- 2018; 2017: Autosport National DOTY; Autosport BRDC Award

Daniel Charles Anthony Ticktum (born 8 June 1999) is a British racing driver who is set to compete in Formula E for Fortescue Zero Racing.

Born in London, Ticktum began competitive kart racing aged eight, winning several national titles. Graduating to junior formulae in 2015, Ticktum debuted in MSA Formula, but received a two-year ban from motorsport for intentionally crashing into a rival under safety car conditions. (Note: Ticktum received a two-year ban, the second year of which was suspended, allowing him to compete in 2017.) He became a member of the Red Bull Junior Team in 2017, winning the Macau Grand Prix in 2017 and 2018, as well as finishing runner-up in the 2018 FIA Formula 3 European Championship. Ticktum was awarded the McLaren Autosport BRDC Award in 2017.

After a brief Super Formula stint in 2019, Ticktum left Red Bull to join the Williams Driver Academy, where he remained until 2021. He raced in FIA Formula 2 from 2020 to 2021 with DAMS and Carlin, before moving to Formula E with NIO. He achieved his maiden victory at the Jakarta ePrix in 2025 for the rebranded Cupra Kiro team. In 2026, Ticktum moved to Fortescue Zero.

== Early career ==
=== Karting career ===
Born in London, Ticktum began karting in 2007 at the age of eight and started racing in championships the following year. He enjoyed early success, winning the Bamford Kart Club Winter Series and competing in the Super 1 National Championship in the Honda Cadet class with Project One Racing in just his first year of competition. In the following two years Ticktum competed to drive in local and national championships, which culminated in winning the Buckmore Park Kart Club Winter Series in 2009 and placing second in the National Super One Championship the same year, having competed for Ambition Motorsport.

In 2011, Ticktum completed the Grand Slam of British national cadet titles — winning the British Formula Kart Stars Championship, National ABkC Super One Championship, British Open Championship and British Grand Prix Championship, beating the likes of Lando Norris, Enaam Ahmed, Jamie Caroline and Billy Monger.

A year later, Ticktum moved into the international scene, competing in the WSK Euro Series and WSK Master Series, finishing both championships as the highest placed rookie.

In 2013, Ticktum joined Ricky Flynn Motorsport, finishing second in the European Championship, tying on points with winner Lando Norris, and second in the National Super One Championship. The same year Ticktum won the KFJ Andrea Margutti Trophy against the likes of Lando Norris and Jehan Daruvala, with previous winners being F1 stars Giancarlo Fisichella, Robert Kubica and Daniil Kvyat.

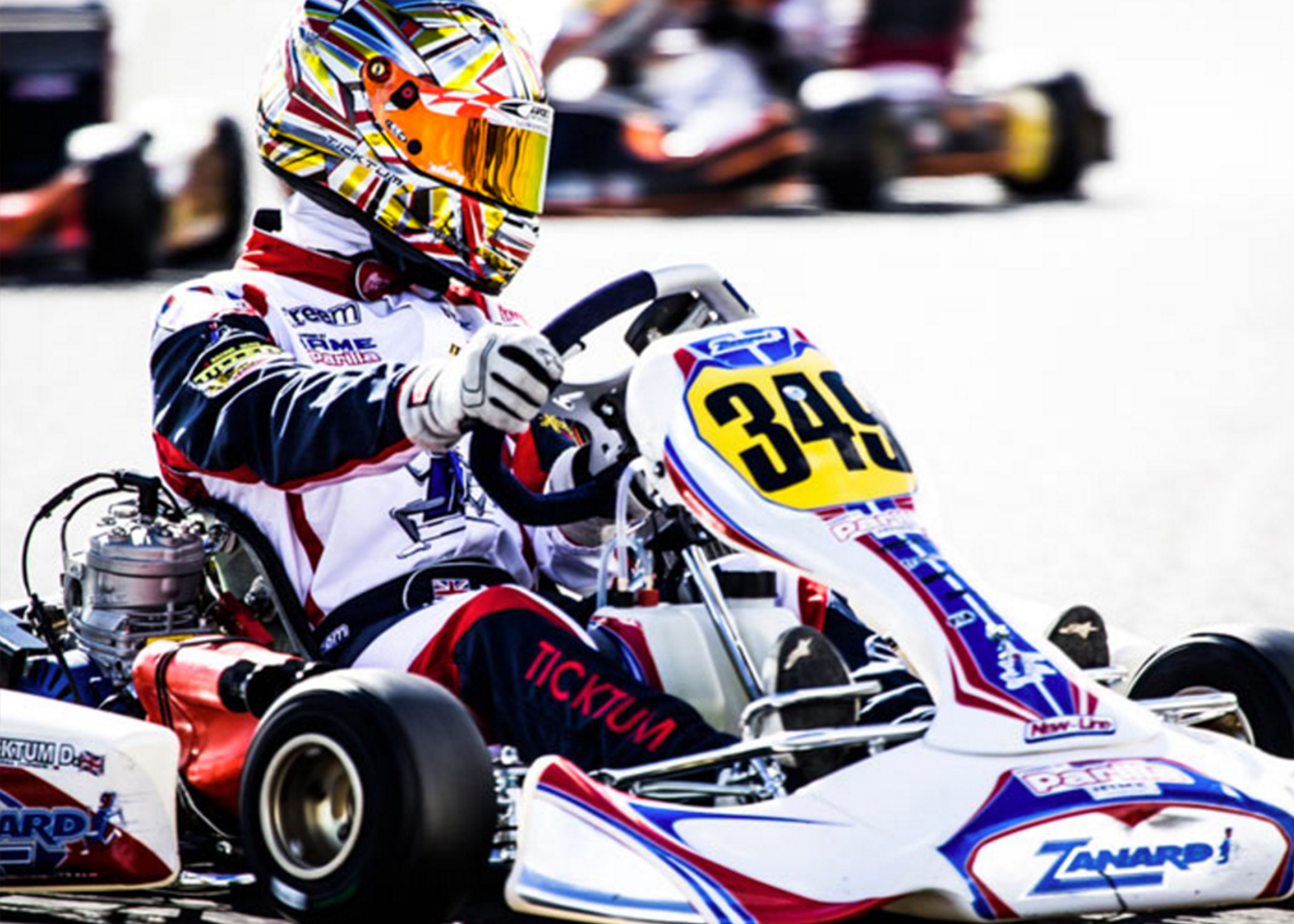
Dan Ticktum in 2014

The following year, Ticktum finished second in the WSK Masters to Enaam Ahmed and took part in his first test in the BRDC Formula 4 Championship with Lanan Racing, where he broke the lap record at the Brands Hatch Indy Circuit. He also finished sixth and fourth in the World and European championships respectively.

=== MSA Formula and two year ban ===
In 2015, Ticktum graduated to MSA Formula with Fortec Motorsport. He led the early rounds of the Championship, taking two victories at Donington and one at Snetterton, but fell behind his main rivals Lando Norris and Colton Herta as the season progressed. At the penultimate round of the season at Silverstone, Ticktum got involved in an incident with Ricky Collard on the opening lap, which dropped him to the back of the field. During the ensuing safety car period he purposely overtook several cars to crash into Collard, taking both out of the race. This saw him receive a two-year ban from motorsport, of which one year was a suspended ban, as well as a disqualification from the event's results. Following the incident, Ticktum labelled himself "a fool" and apologised to his fellow drivers and the track marshals at the circuit. As a result, he finished sixth in his first season of single-seater racing and ended up second in the rookie standings, which he had originally won during the aforementioned Silverstone weekend.

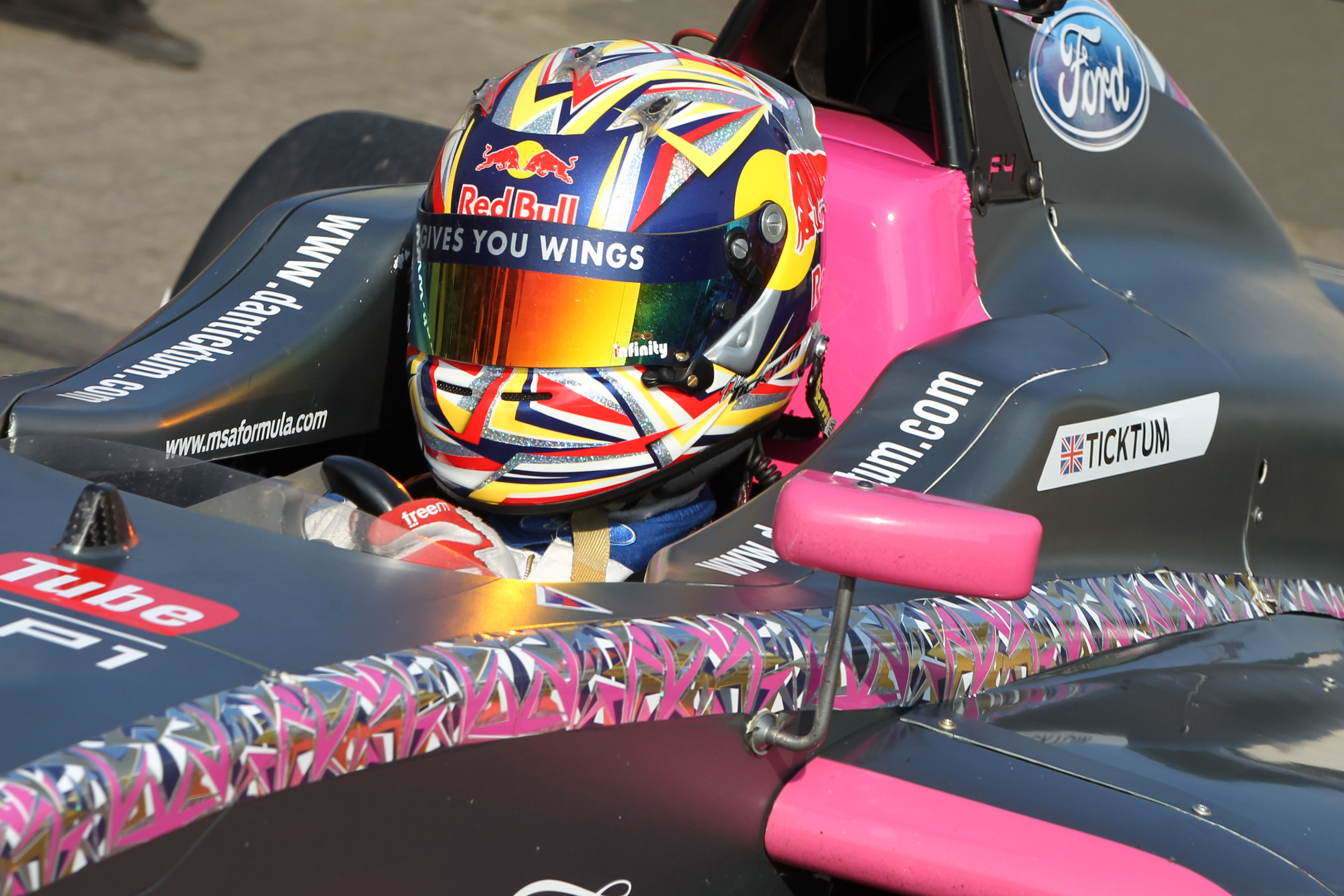
Dan Ticktum in 2015

=== Return to single-seater racing and debut at Macau ===
In 2016, Ticktum returned to motorsport, competing in the final round of the FIA European Formula 3 Championship in Hockenheim with Carlin. He also took part in the BRDC British Formula 3 Autumn Trophy with Double R Racing, where he won the second race and placed fourth in the standings. Following that, Ticktum made his debut in the Macau Grand Prix with Double R Racing, finishing eighth in Saturday's qualifying race before retiring early in the main race thanks to an accident caused by a rival.

=== Formula Renault Eurocup ===
==== 2015 ====
In 2015, Ticktum made a one-off appearance in the Formula Renault Eurocup with Koiranen GP, finishing 16th and eleventh in his two races at the Nürburgring.

==== 2017 ====
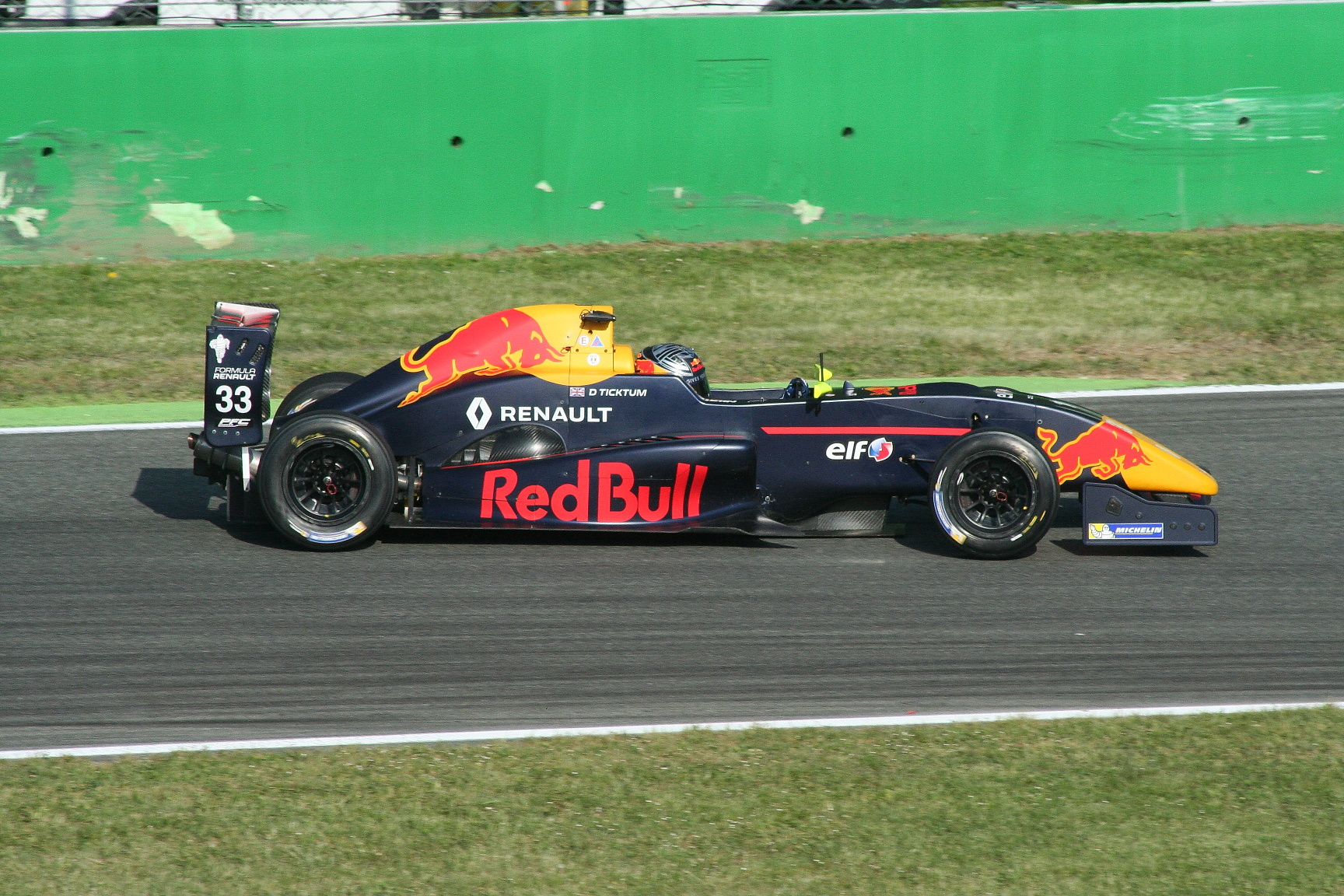
Ticktum driving at Monza during the 2017 Formula Renault Eurocup.

Following Ticktum's return to competition, he went into his first full racing season in 2017, driving in the Eurocup with Arden International, who were making their category debut that year, together with Ghislain Cordeel and Zane Goddard. He also competed in the MRF Challenge in pre-season during the final round. He claimed his only win of the season at the Hungaroring, having qualified on pole during a wet-weather session, and scored two further podiums at Silverstone and the Nürburgring, finishing the season seventh in the drivers' standings. He also became the second-best rookie of the season, finishing thirty points behind Max Fewtrell. At the end of the year, Ticktum was ranked 13th of Motorsport.com's top-20 junior single-seater drivers, and also won the McLaren Autosport BRDC Award.

=== GP3 Series ===
In September 2017, Ticktum made his debut in the GP3 Series at Monza with DAMS, partnering Tatiana Calderón and Bruno Baptista. He claimed a podium finish in his second full race weekend at the season finale in Abu Dhabi and finished eleventh in the standings, ahead of some full-time competitors, including all drivers who raced for DAMS that year.

=== Macau Grand Prix ===
In November 2017, Ticktum competed in a one-off race at the Macau Grand Prix with Team Motopark. He qualified sixth and finished eighth in the Qualifying race, behind two of his teammates. However, Ticktum managed to overtake three of his rivals into Lisboa corner on lap 14 and claimed victory after leaders Ferdinand Habsburg and Sérgio Sette Câmara crashed in the final corner of the 15th and final lap. He would win the race again in 2018 after dominating throughout the whole weekend, topping the qualifying session, winning the qualifying race and dominating from lights to flag in the Grand Prix. Ticktum became the third driver to win the race in consecutive years. On his victory, the Brit stated "I don’t think I ever prepared as hard for a race as this. I’ve never felt so involved or at one with a car before”.

=== FIA European Formula 3 Championship ===
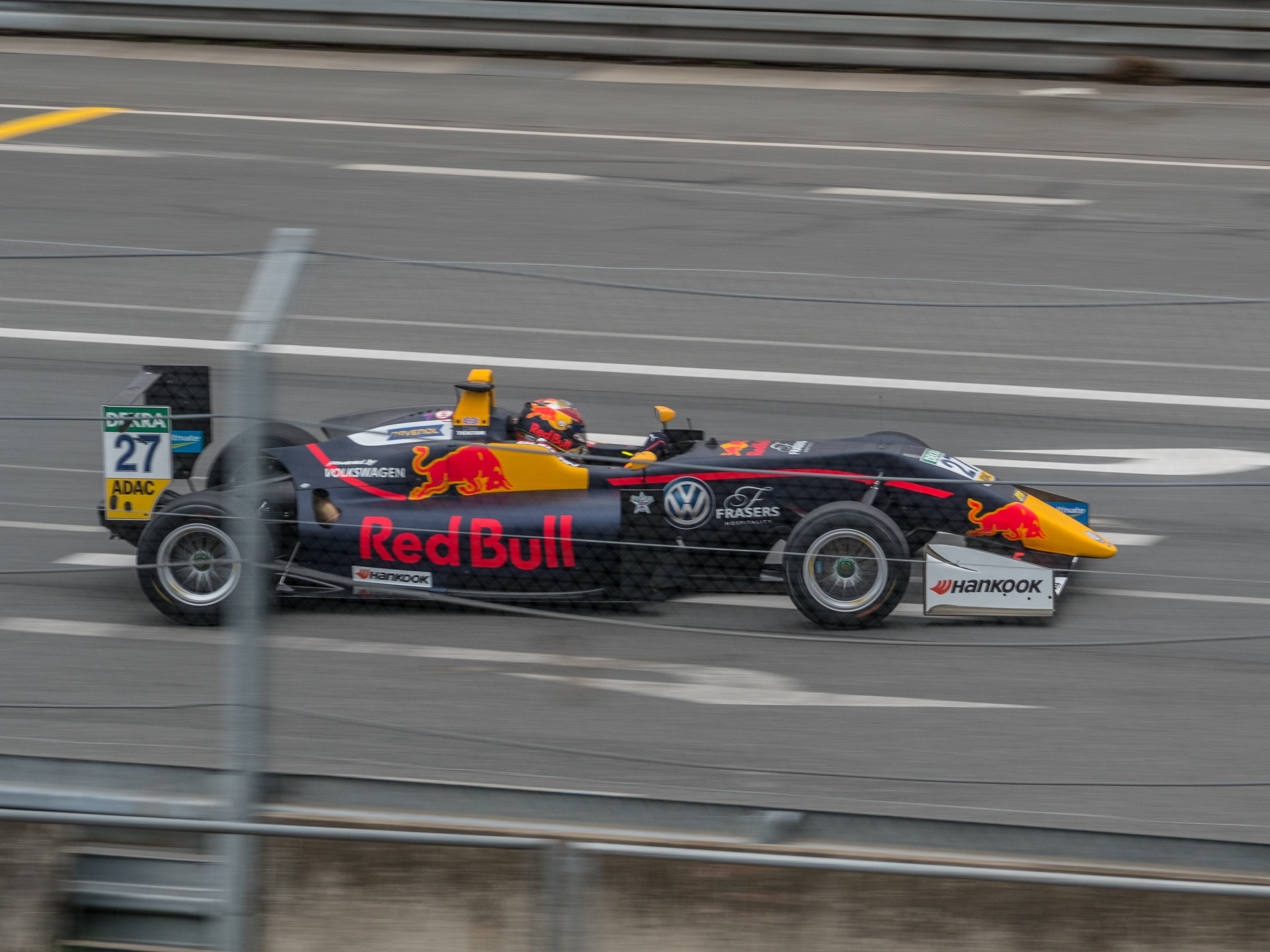
Ticktum at the Norisring in the 2018 FIA Formula 3 European Championship

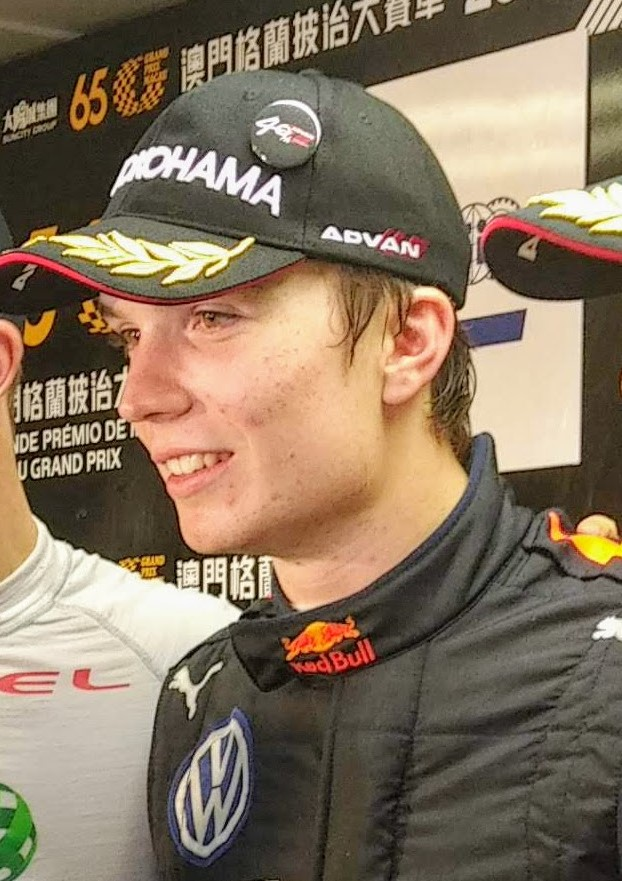
Ticktum after winning the 2018 Macau Grand Prix

In December 2017, it was confirmed that Ticktum would contest the FIA Formula 3 European Championship with Team Motopark in 2018, alongside Sebastián Fernández, Fabio Scherer, Jonathan Aberdein, Marino Sato and Jüri Vips. Ticktum started the season in positive fashion, scoring third place in the opening race at Pau. He would better that result at the Hungaroring, where he took a lights-to-flag win in the first race and finished second to Enaam Ahmed in Race 3, though a component failure prevented a podium in Race 2. At the following round at the Norisring, Ticktum stalled at the start of the second race and was hit from behind by Ameya Vaidyanathan, which forced the Brit to go to hospital and his team to fully repair the car with just a few hours available. Thankfully for Ticktum, Motopark were able to fix his chassis and he went on to win the following race, less than a tenth ahead of teammate Vips. Ticktum later described the work his team had done as "unbelievable".

The Brit endured a difficult weekend at Circuit Zandvoort, with him being squeezed into the path of Mick Schumacher by Ralf Aron at the first corner of the second race and receiving a drive-through penalty for a false start in the third race. Spa would be better for Ticktum, as he took victory in Race 2, having started from tenth on the grid. Another win at Silverstone put Ticktum into the lead of the championship, and he remained there following the seventh event, held at Misano.

However, in the last three rounds of the championship, Schumacher scored a total of eight podiums out of nine races, with five successive wins, which put Ticktum from being 36 points ahead of the Prema driver after the Misano round to being 52 points behind by season's end. Both Ticktum and Prema's Ralf Aron suggested that there was something dubious about the form Schumacher and his teammate Robert Shwartzman were showing in the final third of the season, with Ticktum describing their sudden surge in performance as "interesting".

Ticktum amassed five pole positions and a total of eight podiums, becoming the highest-placed rookie in the final year of the series. His performances also made sure that Motopark would finish second in the teams' championship. Ticktum was ranked fourth of Motorsport.com's top 20 junior single-seater drivers in 2018.

=== Super Formula Championship ===
==== 2018 ====
In mid-2018, Ticktum was announced to make his debut in the Super Formula Championship with Team Mugen at Sportsland Sugo. He retired from that race, but competed in the following event at Fuji, finishing eleventh. Ticktum was classified 19th in the full standings.

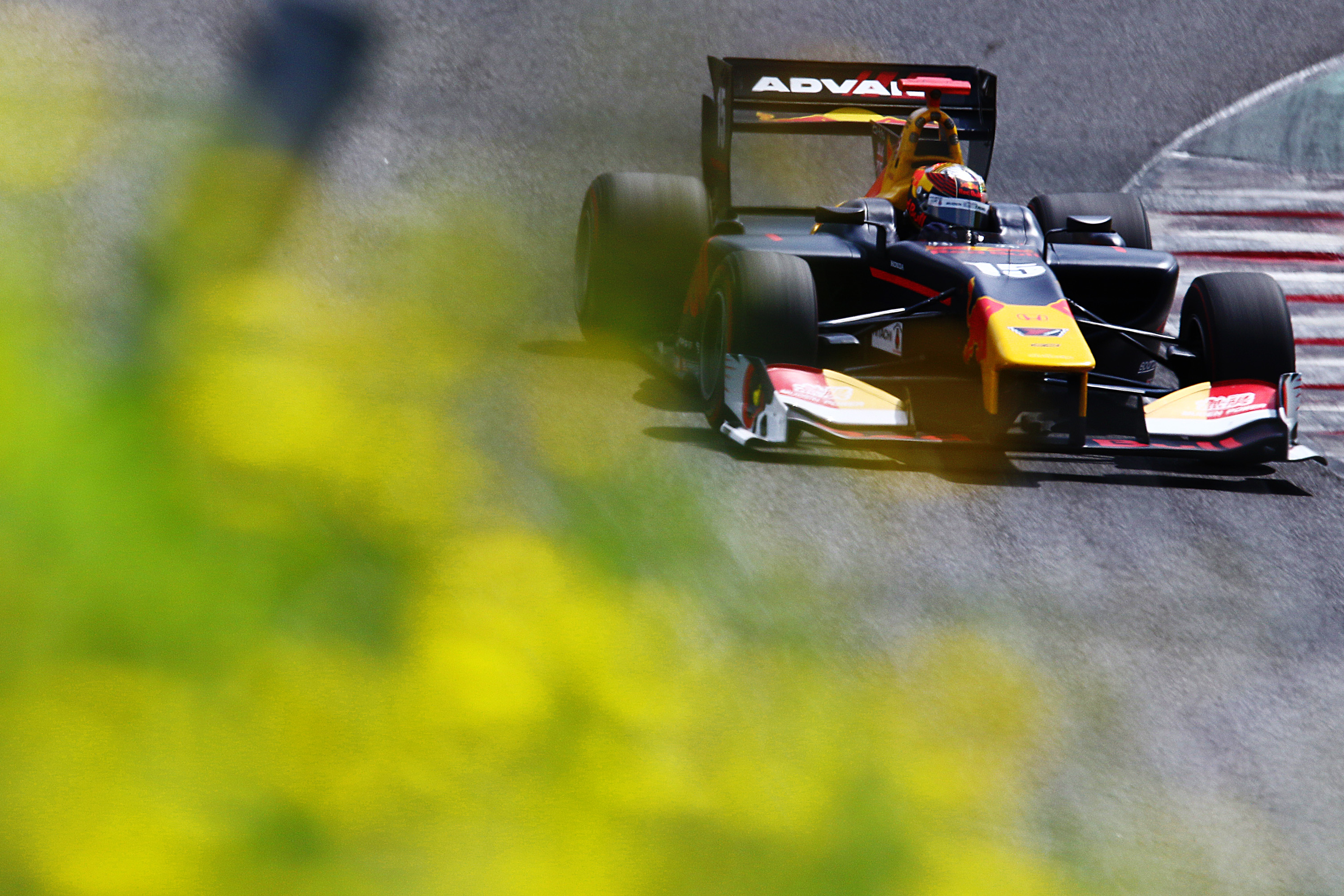
Ticktum making his Super Formula debut at Sportsland Sugo.

==== 2019 ====
Ticktum joined Team Mugen for the 2019 season, partnering Tomoki Nojiri, after an unsuccessful attempt to find a Formula 2 drive. His campaign started out with an eighth place at the Suzuka Circuit, but things would head for the worst when Ticktum stalled his car after a spin on a curb in the next round at Autopolis. The spin damaged the chassis, and, after his request to check the car on a chassis dyno was denied by Mugen, Ticktum found himself being one second behind teammate Nojiri in qualifying for the round at Sportsland Sugo. He finished the race in 15th position. Soon after, Ticktum was announced to be leaving the championship the following week when he was dropped from the Red Bull programme. He was replaced by Patricio O'Ward. Ticktum was eventually classified 20th in the standings.

=== Asian Winter Series ===
Before the start of his 2019 Super Formula campaign, Ticktum participated in the 2019 F3 Asian Winter Series. After scoring a second place, he pulled out of the series before the final round.

=== 2019 post-Super Formula ===
After a brief hiatus from racing following his exit from the Red Bull Junior Team, during which Ticktum briefly considered quitting the sport, he would partake in a shakedown of the new Dallara 320 chassis at Varano. He then competed in two rounds of the Formula Regional European Championship for Van Amersfoort Racing, scoring a pair of second places in Barcelona, this allowed him to end ninth in the standings. In October, he partook in the FIA Formula 3 post-season test with Carlin at the Circuit Ricardo Tormo, following that he returned to the 2019 Macau Grand Prix with Carlin. He was involved in a pileup during the qualification race, but clawed his way back to 13th in the main event.

=== FIA Formula 2 Championship ===
==== 2018 ====
At the start of 2018, Ticktum first tested in Formula 2 when DAMS' Nicholas Latifi had fallen ill. Following the Brit's Formula 3 campaign, he drove for Arden in the final round of the FIA Formula 2 Championship in Abu Dhabi, where he finished eleventh in his first race at that level. However, he was forced to retire from the sprint race after his car had developed a technical issue.

==== 2020 ====
In December 2019, it was announced Ticktum would contest the 2020 season with reigning team champions DAMS alongside Sean Gelael. Ticktum qualified ninth during the first round in Austria and made his way up to fifth in the feature race. He would score his first podium in the sprint race, inheriting third place after an engine issue for Marcus Armstrong. An eighth place came in the feature race of the second Austria round, scoring reverse pole. He would lose the lead to Christian Lundgaard during the sprint, but would come away with a second place. He would be deprived of a podium opportunity in Budapest after a mechanical issue during the sprint race, but scored points in the feature race. Ticktum qualified 12th and finished eighth in the feature race which gave him reverse pole again. He bounced back in the sprint race where he earned his first victory in Formula 2, having held off a charging Lundgaard in the final laps. In the second Silverstone round, Ticktum qualified an impressive fourth, but dropped to 15th at the feature race end. He managed to climb to seventh in the sprint. After topping practice in Barcelona, he went on to qualify eighth. He finished both races in tenth, but scored two points in the sprint race thanks to a fastest lap.

Ticktum did not take part in Belgium practice due to an inconclusive COVID-19 test, but was cleared for qualifying. After securing sixth place in the feature race, he would collide with fellow Williams Academy member Roy Nissany battling for the lead, sending the Israeli into the barriers. In Monza, he qualified tenth and progressed to seventh in the feature race. In the sprint race, he would snatch the lead from Louis Delétraz and lead a lights-to-flag for victory. However, his win was stripped from him due to lack of fuel after crossing the line leading to him falling out of the top ten in the standings. He secured second in qualifying at Mugello, but incidents deprived him of any points. In Russia, he had a solid weekend, taking the final points positions in both races. In Bahrain, he qualified third, and his only points came in the feature race with ninth. During the second Bahrain round and finale, Ticktum claimed reverse pole in the feature race by finishing eighth. He would finish behind the Carlins clinching a third place. Ticktum finished his season eleventh in the championship, placing as the fourth-highest rookie with 96.5 points, one victory and three other podiums. He would later make an appearance at the post-season test in Bahrain for Carlin alongside his F2 rival Jehan Daruvala.

==== 2021 ====
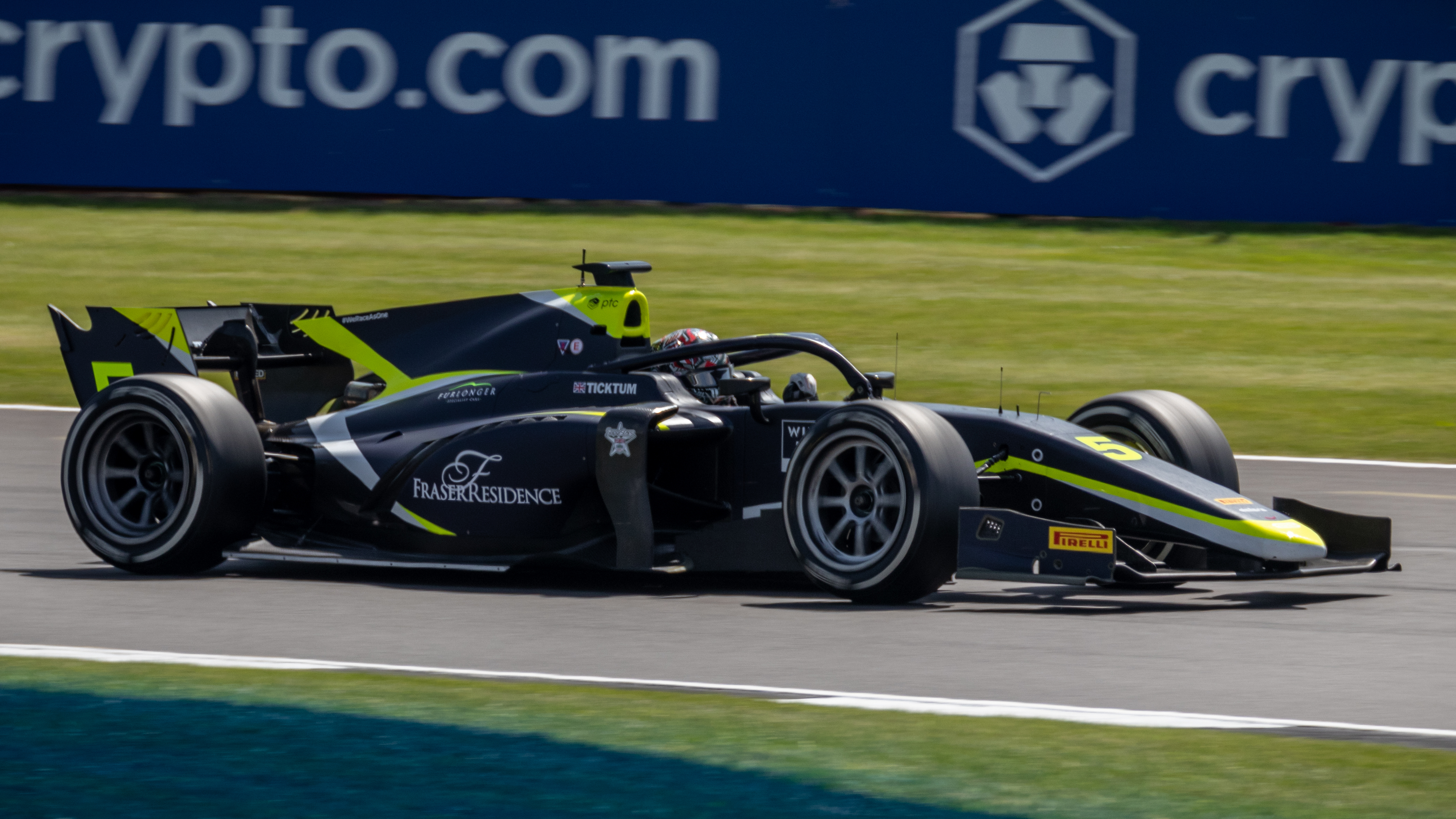
Ticktum driving the Dallara F2 2018 during the 2021 Silverstone Formula 2 round.

In 2021, Ticktum switched to Carlin alongside Daruvala. In the first round at the Bahrain International Circuit, Ticktum qualified fourth for Sunday's feature race. In sprint race 1 he collided with Richard Verschoor and received a five-second penalty. Despite this, he fought back to finish in eighth place. For the next race, he started from third but was forced to retire after being spun around at the first corner by Robert Shwartzman. In the feature race, Ticktum fell back at the start, but through the use of an alternative strategy, he got back to the lead pack and fought for the race win. When he overtook Oscar Piastri, the Australian collided with him and spun out; Ticktum, however, managed to keep going. He overtook Richard Verschoor on the penultimate lap and finished the race in second, only half a second behind Guanyu Zhou. At the next round Ticktum qualified fourth and finished sixth in the first sprint race in Monaco, and after jumping Théo Pourchaire at the start and overtaking Oscar Piastri into the nouvelle chicane in sprint race two, he ended up second, just behind Liam Lawson. After the race Lawson was disqualified for using an illegal throttle map on the formation lap, which promoted Ticktum to take his first win of the season. In the feature race he battled his rival Piastri for a podium spot, but Ticktum was forced to retire when he got stuck at La Rascasse, after an attempted overtake on the Australian. Following the race Ticktum took the blame for the incident and apologised to his team.

Ticktum was able to turn around his favours immediately, finishing second in the first Baku sprint race, having overtaken four drivers in the first half of the race. In the second sprint race of the weekend, Ticktum fell back to the back of the pack after being clipped by Zhou, but charged through the field after a safety car period to take sixth place. The feature race held similar fortunes: after a first-lap collision with Pourchaire and Marcus Armstrong, which led to Ticktum having to pit for repairs, he fought back, moving up to eighth and setting the fastest lap of the race. At the next event, his home race at Silverstone, Ticktum qualified fourth having topped practice. Ticktum finished on the podium in both the second sprint and the feature race, scoring more points that weekend than any other driver bar championship leader Oscar Piastri, and was also the only driver to score two podiums that weekend.

After the summer break, Ticktum qualified in eighth, and was taken out in a collision with Felipe Drugovich in the first race in Monza. and despite eleven overtakes in the second sprint he was unable to get into the points-paying positions. Ticktum then started the feature race from eighth on the grid, being the first driver to line up with harder tyres at the start. After gaining the lead through a safety car period in the middle of the race, a well-timed safety car played into Ticktum's strategy, as he was able to come out of the pits in eleventh on fresher and softer rubber than his competitors with a few laps to go. Having shown supreme car control after being hit from behind at the restart, the Brit charged through the field, and finished third after another safety car on the penultimate lap all but destroyed his chances for a victory. Ticktum scored his second win of the season in mixed conditions at the following round in Sochi, having led the sprint race from start to finish. Despite his victory, Ticktum said in a post-race interview that the win "[didn't] mean much" due to him "not going to be in Formula 1", which had always been his career goal. He finished fifth in the feature race that weekend, having started tenth.

In the penultimate qualifying session of the year in Jeddah, Ticktum's car received a slow puncture with just a few minutes of the session left, which didn't allow him to improve his laptime and led to him qualifying in 13th place. During the first sprint race the Briton moved through the pack to finish seventh, and he started and finished race 2 in fourth. Ticktum finished 10th in the feature race on Sunday, thus ending his podium streak of six consecutive rounds of getting at least one podium. Ticktum had an uneventful weekend in the final round at the Yas Marina Circuit, but finished in the top six in all three races. Ticktum ended up fourth in the drivers' standings with two wins and seven podiums in total and a 159.5 points, 23.5 points behind third-placed Zhou.

=== Return to the Macau Grand Prix (2023) ===
Ticktum returned with Rodin Carlin to participate in the 2023 Macau Grand Prix.

== Formula One ==
=== Red Bull (2017–2019) ===
In January 2017, Ticktum was announced as a member of the Red Bull Junior Team. Ticktum was unable to take part in July 2018 in-season test due to insufficient superlicence points, with Red Bull stating it was "odd". It was also speculated that Ticktum would replace Brendon Hartley at Toro Rosso for the 2019 Formula One season, but it was given to Daniil Kvyat. However, Ticktum was scolded by Red Bull after he questioned Mick Schumacher's recent dominance in the 2018 FIA Formula 3 European Championship. Ticktum drove an F1 car for the first time at Silverstone, driving the McLaren MP4-28, as his reward of winning the 2017 Autosport BRDC Award.

At the start of 2019, Ticktum was able to test the Red Bull RB15 at the young drivers' tests in Bahrain and Barcelona, and took part in a number of simulator sessions at the team's base in Milton Keynes. Red Bull and Ticktum parted ways in mid-2019. Despite him questioning whether Red Bull had given him enough time in Super Formula, Ticktum stated that there was "no disrespect" towards academy boss Helmut Marko, and thanked him for "having given [him] the money to go racing".

=== Williams (2020–2021) ===
Ticktum was named in the line-up of the Williams Driver Academy in December 2019, where he was designated the role of a development driver. He was retained for the 2021 season. In August 2021, shortly after Ticktum caused controversy by criticising and appearing to jibe Williams driver Nicholas Latifi, it was confirmed that he had been released from his contract.

== Formula E ==
=== NIO 333/ERT Formula E Team/Cupra Kiro (2022–2026) ===
==== 2021–22 season ====
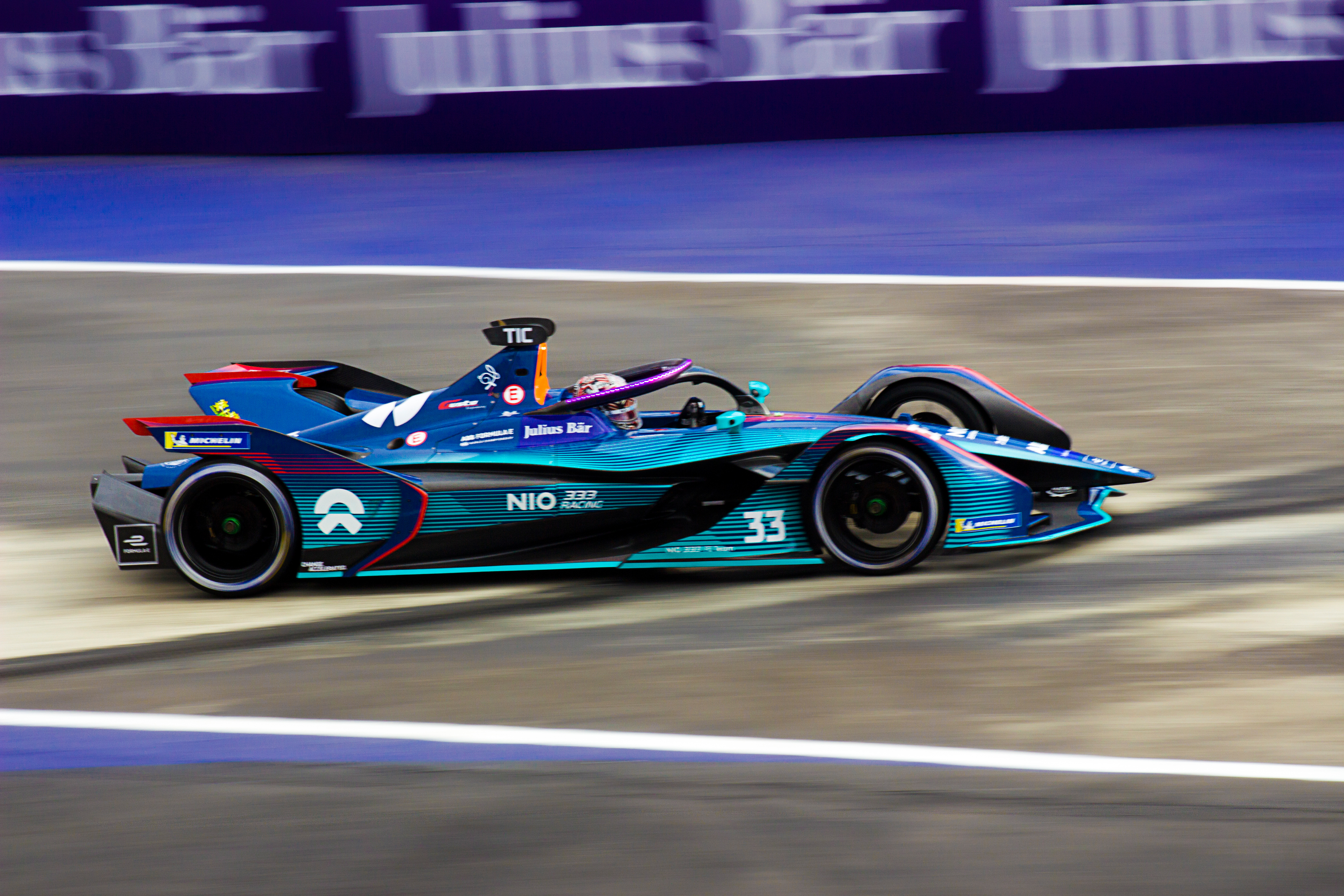
Ticktum practicing a full power lap at the 2022 Mexico City ePrix.

On 25 November 2021, the NIO 333 FE Team announced that Ticktum would be joining Oliver Turvey for the 2021–22 Formula E season. He stated that he was "looking forward to [racing in Formula E], as it's a totally different experience to Formula 2". In his debut race at the Diriyah ePrix, Ticktum beat his teammate and fellow rookie Antonio Giovinazzi to finish 18th. The following day Ticktum qualified in 18th place, but dropped back to 20th by the checkered flag. Ticktum's next race, the Mexico City ePrix, was compromised by a collision with Giovinazzi, which led to another 18th-place finish. Another point-less race in Rome followed, before Ticktum scored his first ever point in Formula E in the second race of the weekend, benefitting from a post-race penalty for Oliver Askew.

At the following round in Monaco, Ticktum beat his teammate Turvey, finishing twelfth, however a weekend in Berlin, which the Brit described as "pretty disastrous", ended with finishes near the back of the pecking order. An additional lowly finish at Jakarta was followed by Ticktum's first retirement of the season at the Marrakesh ePrix. Round 11 at New York City brought a 17th place, although a rapid start and a number of overtakes during Sunday's race enabled Ticktum to finish twelfth. He later described that drive as having been "the performance of [his] life". At his home race in London, a crash in practice hampered his chances, whilst an unsighted collision with Sam Bird meant retirement from Race 2.

The final round of the season in Seoul started out in a positive manner, with Ticktum qualifying in a season-best 13th for Race 1. However, the Brit was involved in a major pile-up on the first lap of a wet race after being hit by Sébastien Buemi, which forced him, alongside five other drivers including teammate Turvey, to retire. In the final qualifying session of the year, Ticktum made it into the duel phase for the first time, starting from seventh on the grid. After a tumultuous start, in which his car was slightly pushed into the wall by Lucas di Grassi, Ticktum ended the first lap sat in sixth place. However, hitting the wall going into the stadium section bent the steering of his car, forcing Ticktum to retire. He finished the season 21st in the standings, helping NIO 333 to not finish last for the first time in three seasons.

Prior to the final weekend of the season, Ticktum remarked that the team had "made massive leaps forward this year" and marked out their gains in qualifying pace as the team's biggest improvement throughout the season. He summed up his season as having been "challenging with lots to learn", whilst also stating that, considering his lack of experience, he was "pretty happy" with being on par with his teammate Turvey over the course of the season.

==== 2022–23 season ====
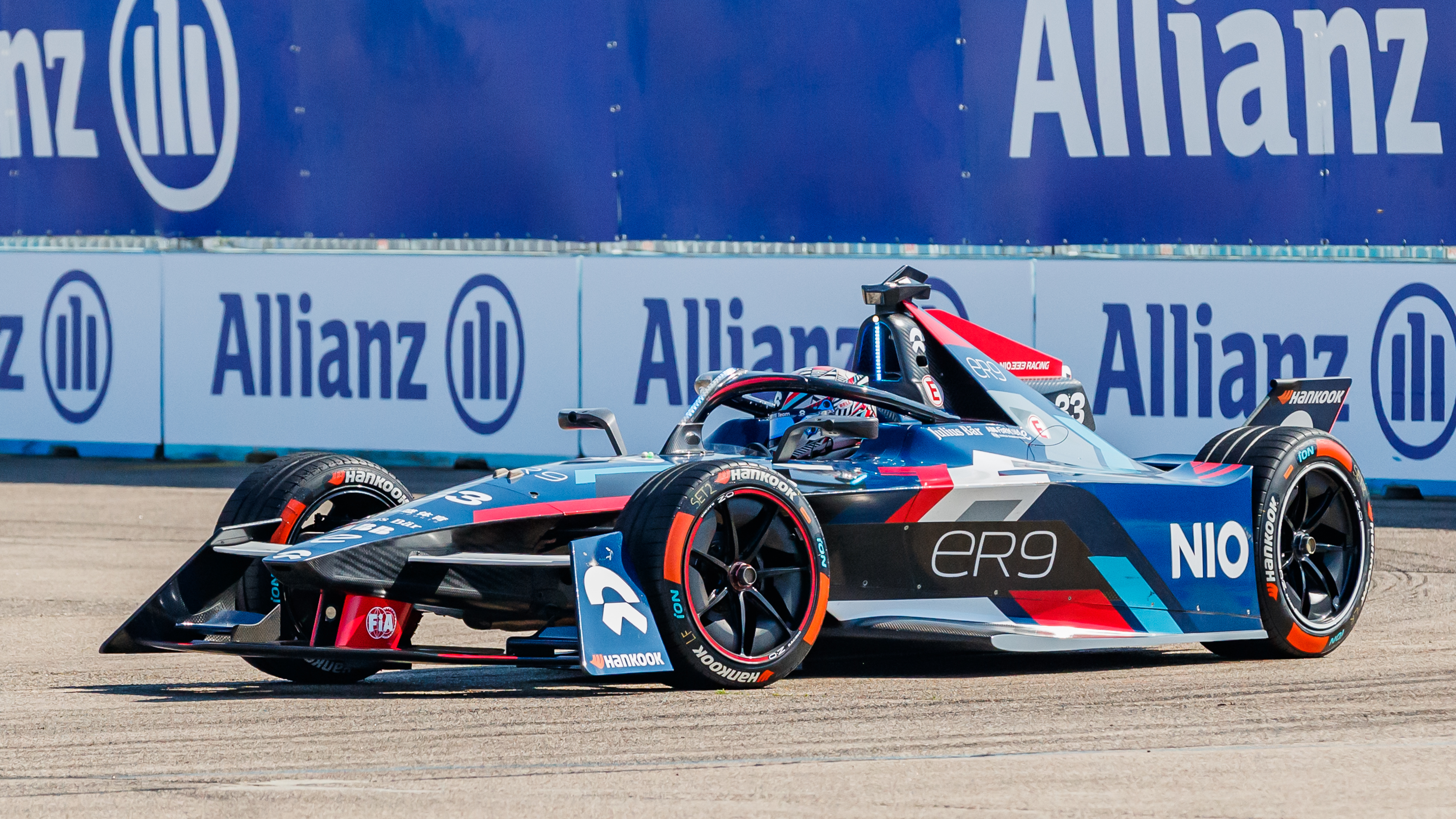
Ticktum at the 2023 Berlin ePrix.

Having tested the new Gen3 era car after the conclusion of the 2022 season, Ticktum was announced to continue his relationship with NIO into 2023 alongside a new teammate, ex-Formula 2 driver Sérgio Sette Câmara who replaces Oliver Turvey. The season opener in Mexico City began with promise, as Ticktum managed to qualify second in his group, thus progressing to the quarter-finals of the session, where he eventually lost out to Jake Hughes, giving him a starting spot of fifth, a personal best and his team's first top-five qualifying since Tom Blomqvist at the 2021 Berlin ePrix. During the race however, a drive-through penalty for his car going over the power limit sent the Briton to the back of the field, where two further penalties for cutting the chicane left him in 17th by the checkered flag.

At the second round in Diriyah, Ticktum managed to improve his best starting position, qualifying fourth, having missed out on a place in the final stage of the duels courtesy of a mistake in the final corner of the semi-final. The Briton fell back during the race, citing energy management issues of the car to have been the reason for a 14th-placed finish. Despite only qualifying in eleventh for the second round in Saudi Arabia, Ticktum managed to finish tenth, scoring his first point of the season. Recapping on the weekend, Ticktum stated he had performed "as good as [he] could have done", with him admitting that the team struggled with battery efficiency throughout the event. At the Hyderabad ePrix two weeks later, car damage forced Ticktum out of the race near the halfway mark. He would come back to points-scoring ways in Cape Town, finishing sixth after having started from eighth place. A disappointing round at São Paulo came next, during which, having missed out on qualifying for the duels in qualifying by a tenth of a second, Ticktum collided into the back of Jake Dennis at Turn 1 after missing his braking point, which earned him a 15-second-penalty. Ticktum apologised to Dennis after the race finished.

For Race 1 of the Berlin ePrix, Ticktum qualified in fourth and experienced an eventful race; Ticktum took the lead at the first corner, though he was later embroiled in a collision with Stoffel Vandoorne, which put both drivers out of the race and earned him a five-place grid drop for the following day. He recovered from an 18th-placed starting spot on Sunday to take a sole point.

The Monaco ePrix brought both points and controversy: Ticktum qualified in fifth place and held himself in the top positions for the majority of the race. After a light tap of Norman Nato's car damaged his front wing, Ticktum piloted his slowing car up the hill after Turn 1, where Maximilian Günther would collide with the back of the NIO, sending the German out of the race. Ticktum was able to remove the broken wing during the safety car period and ended the race in sixth. Whilst Günther called for Ticktum to receive a race ban following the race, the Briton, as well as the race stewards, held the view that it had been a racing incident. Following four successive races where he had missed out on points, Ticktum would end up finishing ninth in Rome before taking two points finishes at the London ePrix, helping his team to finish ahead of Mahindra in the standings.

==== 2023–24 season ====
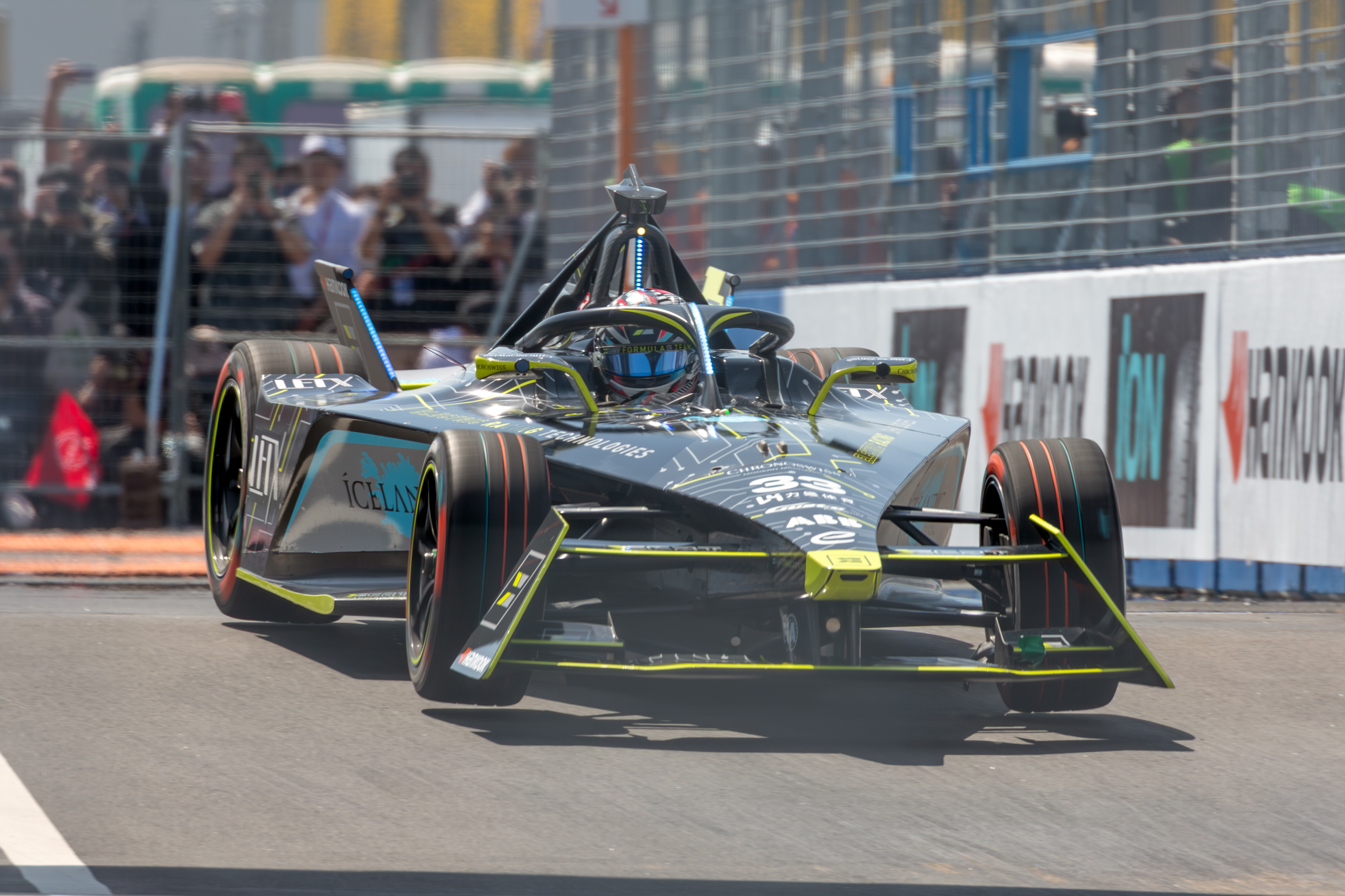
Ticktum at the 2024 Tokyo ePrix

Ticktum remained with NIO for a third successive season alongside Sérgio Sette Câmara once again, as the team rebranded as ERT Formula E Team. His campaign would be more difficult than the previous year, with only one points finish throughout the whole year. However, it would turn out to be his career best Formula E finish with fourth place at the Misano ePrix thanks to a strategy masterclass. His result put him 19th in the drivers' championship with 12 points, ahead of teammate Sette Câmara again, but could not prevent ERT from finishing last in the teams' championship.

==== 2024–25 season ====
Ticktum remained with ERT alongside a new teammate in David Beckmann, as the team rebranded once again to Cupra Kiro. The first race in São Paulo brought good fortunes, as he was able to salvage eighth place in a race of attrition. His next points finish, a ninth place, came in race 2 of the Jeddah ePrix, before Ticktum claimed seventh at a chaotic Miami ePrix. Another seventh place followed at the first Monaco race, although he missed out on the top ten in the second race after sliding off the track following a touch with Nick Cassidy. At the 2025 Tokyo ePrix, Ticktum made a last-lap pass on Edoardo Mortara to claim fifth in race 1. The following day, he reached the qualifying final for the first time in his career, but missed out on pole after touching the wall during the final duel. In the race, Ticktum led a few laps before the midpoint, before eventually battling past Taylor Barnard to take his maiden Formula E podium with third. He was voted driver of the race by the fans.

The next round in Shanghai offered Ticktum another chance to fight at the front: despite starting 21st, Ticktum progressed to a podium spot by the final lap. He tried to pass Barnard for second but got chopped off on the main straight, and the ensuing battle culminated in a last-gasp overtake by Jean-Éric Vergne, who overtook Ticktum and left the Kiro driver fourth at the flag. In a rainy second race, Ticktum suffered a spin and ended up 16th. Ticktum qualified fifth for the race in Jakarta, having missed out on progressing to the semi-final stage by five thousandths versus Barnard. In the ePrix, Ticktum profited from a clash between Jake Dennis and Nyck de Vries, as well as their subsequent car failures, to inherit the lead with six laps to go. With Edoardo Mortara on his tail, Ticktum soaked up the pressure and claimed his first victory in the category. The win, achieved in Ticktum's 60th Formula E start, was the Kiro team's first in its modern iteration, and its first since the 2015 Moscow ePrix when they were named NEXTEV TCR.

In Berlin, Ticktum scored ninth place on Saturday and missed out on points on Sunday, having made a strategic mistake alongside his Porsche marque colleagues by leading in the race's early stages. The season-ending London ePrix was chaotic for Ticktum: during race 1, he punted Mitch Evans into a spin whilst braking hard to defend his position against Jake Dennis, before crashing into the wall in a misjudged overtaking attempt on Sam Bird. Though he scored his maiden Formula E pole position the day after, Ticktum started from sixth owing to a grid penalty for his contact with Evans. The race itself included a penalty for not staying within ten car-lengths of the field whilst the race was under safety car conditions, a heated battle with Pascal Wehrlein, and a penalty for a collision with Norman Nato which Ticktum contested. He finished 11th in the drivers' standings, having helped Porsche to win the manufacturers' title.

==== 2025–26 season ====
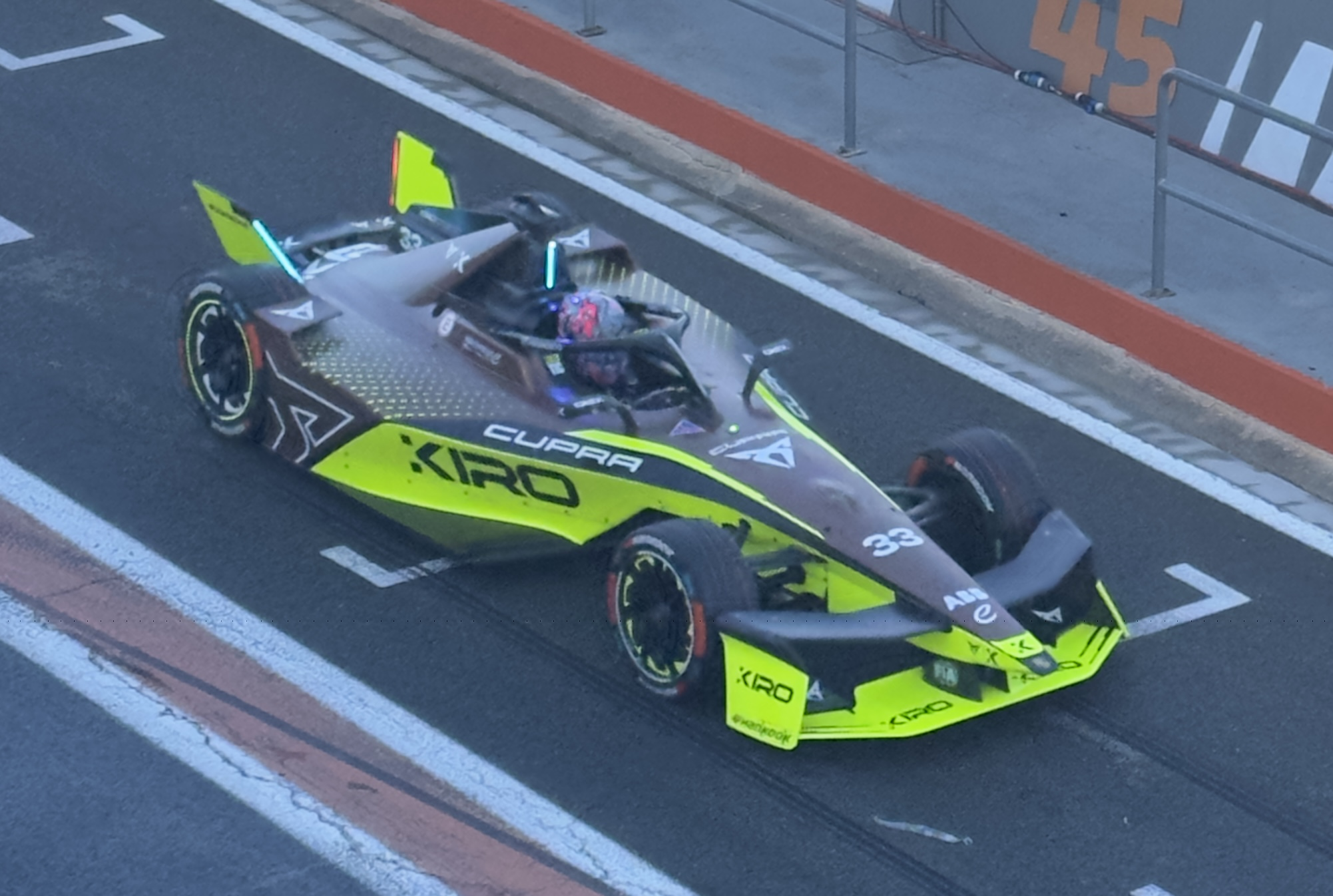
Ticktum at the pre-season test at Valencia.

Ticktum extended his stay with Cupra Kiro for the 2025–26 season.

After qualifying third in the first race of the season at São Paulo, Ticktum's car was hit by Nyck de Vries going into turn 1 after the race started, causing a left-rear puncture. An issue during his pit stop caused him a drive-through penalty. After Ticktum had spinning wheels driving out of the pit lane, he was issued a second drive-through penalty. After having brake failure issues, he retired a few laps later.

At the second race of the season, Mexico City, Ticktum had another DNF after Da Costa collided with Cassidy, sending Günther spinning and causing Ticktum to be hit as he tried to avoid the collision.

In Miami, Ticktum suffered his third DNF of the season. He took his second career victory in Formula E in the fourteenth round of the season in Tokyo, after passing Jake Dennis for the lead on the final lap of the race. He ended the season 15th in the standings, with 62 points. On 12 October 2026, Cupra Kiro announced Pepe Martí and Jake Hughes as their line-up for the 2026–27 season, ending Ticktum's five-year stint with the team.

In August 2026, he tested for Lola Formula E Team.

=== Fortescue Zero Racing (2027–present) ===
On 22 October 2026, Ticktum was announced to be joining the newly formed Fortescue Zero Racing for the 2026–27 season alongside Taylor Barnard.

== Personal life ==
Ticktum has gained a following of over twelve thousand followers on streaming-platform Twitch (as of May 2025), where he plays Call of Duty.

Ticktum is well known for his outspoken, blunt and occasionally discourteous nature, which mostly stands out in interviews and team radio messages and has earned him a controversial reputation. During his successful fourth season in Formula E, Ticktum was described as having become more composed and refined character, partly down to working with mental optimisation coach Gerry Convy.

== Karting record ==
=== Karting career summary ===
Season	Series	Team	Position
2008	Bamford Kart Club Winter Series		**1st**
2008	Super 1 National Championship — Honda Cadet	Project One Racing	11th
2008	British Open Championship — Honda Cadet		15th
2009	Buckmore Park Kart Club Winter Series	Ambition Motorsport	**1st**
2009	Super 1 National Championship — Honda Cadet	Ambition Motorsport	**2nd**
2010	Kartmasters British Grand Prix — Comer Cadet		11th
2010	Formula Kart Stars MSA — Cadet		12th
2010	Super 1 National Championship — Comer Cadet		15th
2011	British Open Championship — Comer Cadet	Fusion Motorsport	**1st**
2011	Super 1 National Championship — Comer Cadet	Fusion Motorsport	**1st**
2011	MSA Formula Kart Stars — Comer Cadet	Fusion Motorsport	**1st**
2011	Kartmasters British Grand Prix — Comer Cadet	Fusion Motorsport	**1st**
2012	South Garda Winter Cup — KF3	Chiesa Corse	16th
2012	Silver Cup — KF3	Chiesa Corse	4th
2012	WSK Master Series — KF3	Chiesa Corse	11th
2012	Campeonato de Espana — KF3	Chiesa Corse	26th
2012	CIK-FIA European Championship — KF3	Chiesa Corse	10th
2012	WSK Euro Series — KF3	Chiesa Corse	8th
2012	CIK-FIA World Cup — KF3	Chiesa Corse	24th
2012	WSK Final Cup — KF3	Chiesa Corse	31st
2012	Trofeo delle Industrie — KF3	Ricky Flynn Motorsport	6th
2013	Super 1 National Championship — KFJ		**2nd**
2013	South Garda Winter Cup — KF3	Ricky Flynn Motorsport	**3rd**
2013	Andrea Margutti Trophy — KFJ	Ricky Flynn Motorsport	**1st**
2013	WSK Euro Series — KFJ	Ricky Flynn Motorsport	4th
2013	WSK Super Master Series — KFJ	Ricky Flynn Motorsport	5th
2013	CIK-FIA European Championship — KFJ	Ricky Flynn Motorsport	**2nd**
2013	CIK-FIA International Super Cup — KFJ	Ricky Flynn Motorsport	11th
2013	WSK Final Cup — KFJ	Ricky Flynn Motorsport	8th
2013	CIK-FIA World Championship — KFJ	Ricky Flynn Motorsport	7th
2014	South Garda Winter Cup — KF3	Zanardi Strakka Racing	4th
2014	WSK Champions Cup — KFJ	Zanardi Strakka Racing	**3rd**
2014	Andrea Margutti Trophy — KFJ	Zanardi Strakka Racing	34th
2014	WSK Super Master Series — KFJ	Zanardi Strakka Racing	**2nd**
2014	CIK-FIA European Championship — KFJ	Zanardi Strakka Racing	4th
2014	CIK-FIA World Championship — KFJ	Zanardi Strakka Racing	6th

=== Complete CIK-FIA Karting European Championship results ===
(key) (Races in bold indicate pole position) (Races in italics indicate fastest lap)

Year	Team	Class	1	2	3	4	5	6	7	8	DC	Points
2012	Chiesa Corse	KF3	PSB; R1; 8	PSB; R2; 6	PFI; R1; DNQ	PFI; R2; DNQ					10th	18
2013	Ricky Flynn Motorsport	KFJ	ALC; DNQ	**ORT**; 1							2nd	25
2014	Ricky Flynn Motorsport	KFJ	LAC; QH; 22	LAC; R 10	ZUE; QH; 9	ZUE; R 2	KRI; QH; 2	KRI; R 5	PFI; QH; 16	PFI; R 29	4th	48

=== Complete Karting World Championship results ===
Year	Team	Class	Prefinals	Main race
2013	(United Kingdom) Ricky Flynn Motorsport	KFJ	N/A	7th
2014	(Sweden) Zanardi Strakka Racing	KFJ	**2nd**	6th

== Racing record ==
=== Racing career summary ===
Season	Series	Team	Races	Wins	Poles	F/Laps	Podiums	Points	Position
2015	MSA Formula Championship	Fortec Motorsports	27	3	3	5	10	242	6th
2015	Formula Renault 2.0 NEC	Koiranen GP	4	0	0	0	0	41	23rd
2015	Eurocup Formula Renault 2.0	Koiranen GP	2	0	0	0	0	0	NC†
2016	FIA Formula 3 European Championship	Carlin	3	0	0	0	0	0	NC†
2016	BRDC British Formula 3 Autumn Trophy	Double R Racing	3	1	0	1	2	59	4th
2016	Macau Grand Prix	Double R Racing	1	0	0	0	0	—N/a	DNF
2016–17	MRF Challenge Formula 2000	MRF Racing	4	0	0	0	1	41	11th
2017	Formula Renault Eurocup	Arden International	23	1	1	2	3	134	7th
2017	Formula Renault NEC	Arden International	5	0	0	0	1	0	NC†
2017	GP3 Series	DAMS	5	0	0	1	1	34	11th
2017	Macau Grand Prix	Motopark	1	1	0	0	1	—N/a	**1st**
2018	FIA Formula 3 European Championship	Motopark	30	4	5	1	8	308	**2nd**
2018	Macau Grand Prix	Motopark	1	1	1	1	1	—N/a	**1st**
2018	Super Formula	Team Mugen	2	0	0	0	0	0	19th
2018	FIA Formula 2 Championship	BWT Arden	2	0	0	0	0	0	23rd
2019	Super Formula	Team Mugen	3	0	0	0	0	1	20th
2019	F3 Asian Winter Series	Dragon Hitech GP	6	0	2	0	1	38	9th
2019	Formula Regional European Championship	Van Amersfoort Racing	6	0	0	0	2	64	9th
2019	Macau Grand Prix	Carlin Buzz Racing	1	0	0	0	0	—N/a	13th
2019	Formula One	Aston Martin Red Bull Racing	Test/Development driver						
2020	FIA Formula 2 Championship	DAMS	24	1	0	1	4	96.5	11th
2020	Formula One	Williams Racing	Development driver						
2021	FIA Formula 2 Championship	Carlin	23	2	0	1	7	159.5	4th
2021	Formula One	Williams Racing	Development driver						
2021–22	Formula E	NIO 333 FE Team	16	0	0	0	0	1	21st
2022–23	Formula E	Nio 333 Racing	16	0	0	0	0	28	17th
2023	Macau Grand Prix	Rodin Carlin	1	0	0	0	0	—N/a	13th
2023–24	Formula E	ERT Formula E Team	16	0	0	0	0	12	19th
2024–25	Formula E	Cupra Kiro	16	1	1	1	2	85	11th
2025–26	Formula E	Cupra Kiro	17	1	2	1	1	62	15th
2026–27	Formula E	Fortescue Zero Racing	0	0	0	0	0	0	TBD

^{†} As Ticktum was a guest driver, he was ineligible for points.
* Season still in progress.

=== Complete MSA Formula results ===
(key) (Races in bold indicate pole position; races in italics indicate fastest lap)

Year	Entrant	1	2	3	4	5	6	7	8	9	10	11	12	13	14	15	16	17	18	19	20	21	22	23	24	25	26	27	28	29	30	DC	Points
2015	Fortec Motorsport	BHI; 1; 2	BHI; 2; 2	BHI; 3; 5	**DON**; **1**; 1	DON; 2; 5	**DON**; **3**; 1	THR; 1; 7	THR; 2 Ret	THR; 3 Ret	OUL; 1; 9	OUL; 2; 3	OUL; 3; 4	CRO; 1 DSQ	CRO; 2 DSQ	CRO; 3 DSQ	SNE; 1; 1	SNE; 2; 2	SNE; 3; 3	KNO; 1; 8	KNO; 2 Ret	**KNO**; **3**; 8	ROC; 1; 2	ROC; 2; 5	ROC; 3; 3	SIL; 1 DSQ	SIL; 2 DSQ	SIL; 3 DSQ	BHGP; 1	BHGP; 2	BHGP; 3	6th	242

=== Complete Formula Renault Northern European Cup results ===
(key) (Races in bold indicate pole position) (Races in italics indicate fastest lap)

Year	Team	1	2	3	4	5	6	7	8	9	10	11	12	13	14	15	16	DC	Points
2015	Koiranen GP	MNZ; 1	MNZ; 2	SIL; 1	SIL; 2	RBR; 1	RBR; 2	RBR; 3	SPA; 1; 15	SPA; 2; 11	ASS; 1	ASS; 2	NÜR; 1; 7	NÜR; 2; 5	HOC; 1	HOC; 2	HOC; 3	23rd	41
2017	Arden International	MNZ; 1	MNZ; 2	ASS; 1	ASS; 2	NÜR; 1; 3	NÜR; 2; 13	SPA; 1; 18	SPA; 2; 11	SPA; 3; 7	HOC; 1	HOC; 2						NC†	0

^{†} As Ticktum was a guest driver, he was ineligible for points.

=== Complete Formula Renault Eurocup results ===
(key) (Races in bold indicate pole position; races in italics indicate fastest lap)

Year	Entrant	1	2	3	4	5	6	7	8	9	10	11	12	13	14	15	16	17	18	19	20	21	22	23	DC	Points
2015	Koiranen GP	ALC; 1	ALC; 2	ALC; 3	SPA; 1	SPA; 2	HUN; 1	HUN; 2	SIL; 1	SIL; 2	SIL; 3	NÜR; 1; 16	NÜR; 2; 11	LMS; 1	LMS; 2	JER; 1	JER; 2	JER; 3							NC†	0
2017	Arden	MNZ; 1; 11	MNZ; 2 Ret	SIL; 1; 10	SIL; 2; 3	PAU; 1; 10	PAU; 2 Ret	MON; 1; 5	MON; 2; 5	**HUN**; **1**; 1	HUN; 2; 9	HUN; 3; 7	NÜR; 1; 4	NÜR; 2; 2	RBR; 1; 9	RBR; 2; 5	LEC; 1 Ret	LEC; 2; 5	SPA; 1; 18	SPA; 2; 11	SPA; 3; 7	CAT; 1; 20	CAT; 2; 7	CAT; 3; 12	7th	134

^{†} As Ticktum was a guest driver, he was ineligible for points.

=== Complete FIA Formula 3 European Championship results ===
(key) (Races in bold indicate pole position; races in italics indicate fastest lap)

Year	Entrant	Engine	1	2	3	4	5	6	7	8	9	10	11	12	13	14	15	16	17	18	19	20	21	22	23	24	25	26	27	28	29	30	DC	Points
2016	Carlin	Volkswagen	LEC; 1	LEC; 2	LEC; 3	HUN; 1	HUN; 2	HUN; 3	PAU; 1	PAU; 2	PAU; 3	RBR; 1	RBR; 2	RBR; 3	NOR; 1	NOR; 2	NOR; 3	ZAN; 1	ZAN; 2	ZAN; 3	SPA; 1	SPA; 2	SPA; 3	NÜR; 1	NÜR; 2	NÜR; 3	IMO; 1	IMO; 2	IMO; 3	HOC; 1; 13	HOC; 2; 20	HOC; 3; 14	NC*	0
2018	Motopark	Volkswagen	**PAU**; **1**; 3	PAU; 2 Ret	PAU; 3; 5‡	**HUN**; **1**; 1	**HUN**; **2** Ret	HUN; 3; 2	NOR; 1; 4	NOR; 2 Ret	NOR; 3; 1	ZAN; 1; 5	**ZAN**; **2**; 6	**ZAN**; **3** Ret	SPA; 1; 13	SPA; 2; 1	SPA; 3; 5	SIL; 1; 1	SIL; 2; 8	SIL; 3; 6	MIS; 1; 6	MIS; 2; 4	MIS; 3; 4	NÜR; 1; 3	NÜR; 2; 3	NÜR; 3; 4	RBR; 1; 8	RBR; 2; 17†	RBR; 3; 4	HOC; 1; 5	HOC; 2; 7	HOC; 3; 4	2nd	308

^{†} Driver did not finish the race, but was classified as he completed over 90% of the race distance.
^{*} As Ticktum was a guest driver, he was ineligible for points.
^{‡} Half points awarded as less than 75% of race distance was completed.

=== Complete Macau Grand Prix results ===
Year	Team	Car	Qualifying	Quali Race	Main race
2016	(United Kingdom) Double R Racing	Dallara F312	13th	8th	DNF
2017	(Germany) Motopark	Dallara F317	6th	8th	**1st**
2018	(Germany) Motopark	Dallara F317	**1st**	**1st**	**1st**
2019	(United Kingdom) Carlin Buzz Racing	Dallara F3 2019	13th	NC	13th
2023	(United Kingdom) Rodin Carlin	Dallara F3 2019	13th	DNF	13th

=== Complete MRF Challenge Formula 2000 Championship results ===
(key) (Races in bold indicate pole position; races in italics indicate fastest lap)

Year	Team	1	2	3	4	5	6	7	8	9	10	11	12	13	14	15	16	DC	Points
2016–17	MRF Racing	BHR; 1	BHR; 2	BHR; 3	BHR; 4	DUB; 1	DUB; 2	DUB; 3	DUB; 4	GNO; 1	GNO; 2	GNO; 3	GNO; 4	CHE; 1; 6	CHE; 2; 3	CHE; 3; 10	CHE; 4; 6	12th	32

=== Complete GP3 Series results ===
(key) (Races in bold indicate pole position; races in italics indicate fastest lap)

Year	Entrant	1	2	3	4	5	6	7	8	9	10	11	12	13	14	15	16	Pos	Points
2017	DAMS	CAT; FEA	CAT; SPR	RBR; FEA	RBR; SPR	SIL; FEA	SIL; SPR	HUN; FEA	HUN; SPR	SPA; FEA	SPA; SPR	MNZ; FEA; 13	MNZ; SPR; C	JER; FEA; 4	JER; SPR; Ret	YMC; FEA; 4	YMC; SPR; 3	11th	34

=== Complete Super Formula results ===
(key) (Races in bold indicate pole position; races in italics indicate fastest lap)

Year	Team	Engine	1	2	3	4	5	6	7	DC	Points
2018	Team Mugen	Honda	SUZ	AUT	SUG; Ret	FUJ; 11	MOT	OKA	SUZ	19th	0
2019	Team Mugen	Honda	SUZ; 8	AUT; Ret	SUG; 15	FUJ	MOT	OKA	SUZ	20th	1

=== Complete FIA Formula 2 Championship results ===
(key) (Races in bold indicate pole position points) (Races in italics indicate points for the fastest lap of top ten finishers)

Year	Entrant	1	2	3	4	5	6	7	8	9	10	11	12	13	14	15	16	17	18	19	20	21	22	23	24	DC	Points
2018	BWT Arden	BHR; FEA	BHR; SPR	BAK; FEA	BAK; SPR	CAT; FEA	CAT; SPR	MON; FEA	MON; SPR	LEC; FEA	LEC; SPR	RBR; FEA	RBR; SPR	SIL; FEA	SIL; SPR	HUN; FEA	HUN; SPR	SPA; FEA	SPA; SPR	MNZ; FEA	MNZ; SPR	SOC; FEA	SOC; SPR	YMC; FEA; 11	YMC; SPR; Ret	23rd	0
2020	DAMS	RBR; FEA; 5	RBR; SPR; 3	RBR; FEA; 8	RBR; SPR; 2	HUN; FEA; 9	HUN; SPR; NC	SIL; FEA; 8	SIL; SPR; 1	SIL; FEA; 15	SIL; SPR; 7	CAT; FEA; 9	CAT; SPR; 10	SPA; FEA; 6	SPA; SPR; 10	MNZ; FEA; 7	MNZ; SPR; DSQ	MUG; FEA; 17	MUG; SPR; 17	SOC; FEA; 10	SOC; SPR; 8‡	BHR; FEA; 9	BHR; SPR; 12	BHR; FEA; 8	BHR; SPR; 3	11th	96.5
2021	Carlin	BHR; SP1; 8	BHR; SP2; Ret	BHR; FEA; 2	MCO; SP1; 6	MCO; SP2; 1	MCO; FEA; Ret	BAK; SP1; 2	BAK; SP2; 6	BAK; FEA; 8	SIL; SP1; 8	SIL; SP2; 3	SIL; FEA; 2	MNZ; SP1; Ret	MNZ; SP2; 11	MNZ; FEA; 3	SOC; SP1; 1	SOC; SP2; C	SOC; FEA; 5	JED; SP1; 7	JED; SP2; 4	JED; FEA; 10‡	YMC; SP1; 6	YMC; SP2; 4	YMC; FEA; 6	4th	159.5

^{‡} Half points awarded as less than 75% of race distance was completed.

=== Complete F3 Asian Winter Series results ===
(key) (Races in bold indicate pole position) (Races in italics indicate fastest lap)

Year	Team	1	2	3	4	5	6	7	8	9	Pos	Points
2019	Dragon Hitech GP	**CHA**; **1** Ret	CHA; 2; 6	**CHA**; **3**; 2	SEP1; 1 DNS	SEP1; 2; 5	SEP1; 3; 9	SEP2; 1	SEP2; 2	SEP2; 3	9th	38

=== Complete Formula Regional European Championship results ===
(key) (Races in bold indicate pole position; races in italics indicate fastest lap)

Year	Entrant	1	2	3	4	5	6	7	8	9	10	11	12	13	14	15	16	17	18	19	20	21	22	23	24	25	DC	Points
2019	Van Amersfoort Racing	LEC; 1	LEC; 2	LEC; 3	VLL; 1	VLL; 2	VLL; 3	HUN; 1	HUN; 2	HUN; 3	RBR; 1	RBR; 2	RBR; 3	IMO; 1	IMO; 2	IMO; 3	IMO; 4	CAT; 1; 2	CAT; 2; 5	CAT; 3; 2	MUG; 1; 8	MUG; 2; 6	MUG; 3; 7	MNZ; 1	MNZ; 2	MNZ; 3	9th	64

=== Complete Formula E results ===
(key) (Races in bold indicate pole position; races in italics indicate fastest lap)

Year	Team	Chassis	Powertrain	1	2	3	4	5	6	7	8	9	10	11	12	13	14	15	16	17	Pos	Points
2021–22	NIO 333 FE Team	Spark SRT05e	NIO 333 001	DRH; 18	DRH; 19	MEX; 18	RME; 18	RME; 10	MCO; 12	BER; 19	BER; 20	JAK; 18	MRK; Ret	NYC; 17	NYC; 12	LDN; 17	LDN; Ret	SEO; Ret	SEO; Ret		21st	1
2022–23	NIO 333 FE Team	Formula E Gen3	NIO 333 ER9	MEX; 17	DRH; 14	DRH; 10	HYD; Ret	CAP; 6	SAO; 17	BER; Ret	BER; 10	MCO; 6	JAK; 13	JAK; 11	POR; 13	RME; 13	RME; 9	LDN; 7	LDN; 9		17th	28
2023–24	ERT Formula E Team	Formula E Gen3	ERT X24	MEX; 18	DRH; 21	DRH; Ret	SAO; 16	TOK; 18	MIS; 4	MIS; 14	MCO; 13	BER; 14	BER; 17	SIC; 20	SIC; 21	POR; 17	POR; 15	LDN; 13	LDN; 14		19th	12
2024–25	Kiro Race Co	Formula E Gen3 Evo	Porsche 99X Electric WCG3	SAO; 8	MEX; 16	JED; 18	JED; 9	MIA; 7	MCO; 7	MCO; 15	TKO; 5	TKO; 3	SHA; 4	SHA; 16	JKT; 1	BER; 9	BER; 14	LDN; Ret	**LDN**; 14		11th	85
2025–26	Cupra Kiro	Formula E Gen3 Evo	Porsche 99X Electric	SAO; Ret	MEX; Ret	MIA; Ret	JED; 12	JED; 5	MAD; 4	BER; 20†	BER; 14	**MCO**; 12	**MCO**; 14	SAN; 15	SHA; 13	SHA; 11	TKO; 1	TKO; 14	LDN; 6	LDN; 16	15th	62

^{*} Season still in progress.

== Notes ==
Sporting positions
Preceded by António Félix da Costa	Macau Grand Prix; Winner; 2017–2018	Succeeded by Richard Verschoor
Awards and achievements
Preceded by Lando Norris	McLaren Autosport BRDC Award; 2017	Succeeded by Tom Gamble
Preceded by Lando Norris	Autosport Awards; National Driver of the Year; 2018	Succeeded by Colin Turkington
