= 2017 Macau Grand Prix =

Formula Three motor race

Race details
Date	19 November 2017
Official name	64th Suncity Group Macau Grand Prix – FIA F3 World Cup
Location	Guia Circuit, Macau
Course	Temporary street circuit 6.120 km (3.803 mi)
Distance	Qualifying Race; 10 laps, 61.200 km (38.028 mi); Main Race; 15 laps, 91.800 km (57.042 mi)
Weather	Qualifying Race: Overcast; Main Race: Overcast
- Qualifying Race

Pole
Driver	(Sweden) Joel Eriksson	Motopark
Time	2:10.720

Fastest Lap
Driver	(United Kingdom) Dan Ticktum	Motopark
Time	2:12.281 (on lap 3)

Podium
First	(United Kingdom) Callum Ilott	Prema Powerteam
Second	(Sweden) Joel Eriksson	Motopark
Third	(Brazil) Sérgio Sette Câmara	Motopark
- Main Race

Pole
Driver	(United Kingdom) Callum Ilott	Prema Powerteam

Fastest Lap
Driver	(Germany) Mick Schumacher	Prema Powerteam
Time	2:12.651

Podium
First	(United Kingdom) Dan Ticktum	Motopark
Second	(United Kingdom) Lando Norris	Carlin
Third	(Estonia) Ralf Aron	Van Amersfoort Racing

The 2017 Macau Grand Prix (formally the 64th Suncity Group Macau Grand Prix – FIA F3 World Cup) was a motor race for Formula Three cars that was held on the streets of Macau on 19 November 2017. Unlike other races, such as the Pau Grand Prix, the 2017 Macau Grand Prix was not a part of any Formula Three championship, but was open to entries from all Formula Three championships. The race itself was made up of two races: a ten-lap qualifying race that decided the starting grid for the fifteen-lap main race. The 2017 race was the 64th running of the Macau Grand Prix, the 35th for Formula Three cars and the 2nd edition of the FIA F3 World Cup.

The Grand Prix was won by Motopark driver Dan Ticktum, having finished eighth in the previous day's qualification race which was won by Theodore Racing by Prema driver Callum Ilott. Ticktum led only the final lap of the Grand Prix after Ferdinand Habsburg and Sérgio Sette Câmara crashed at the final corner while battling for the victory. Second place went to Lando Norris, competing for Carlin, while the podium was completed by the highest-placed rookie driver, Ralf Aron for Van Amersfoort Racing.

== Entry list and background ==
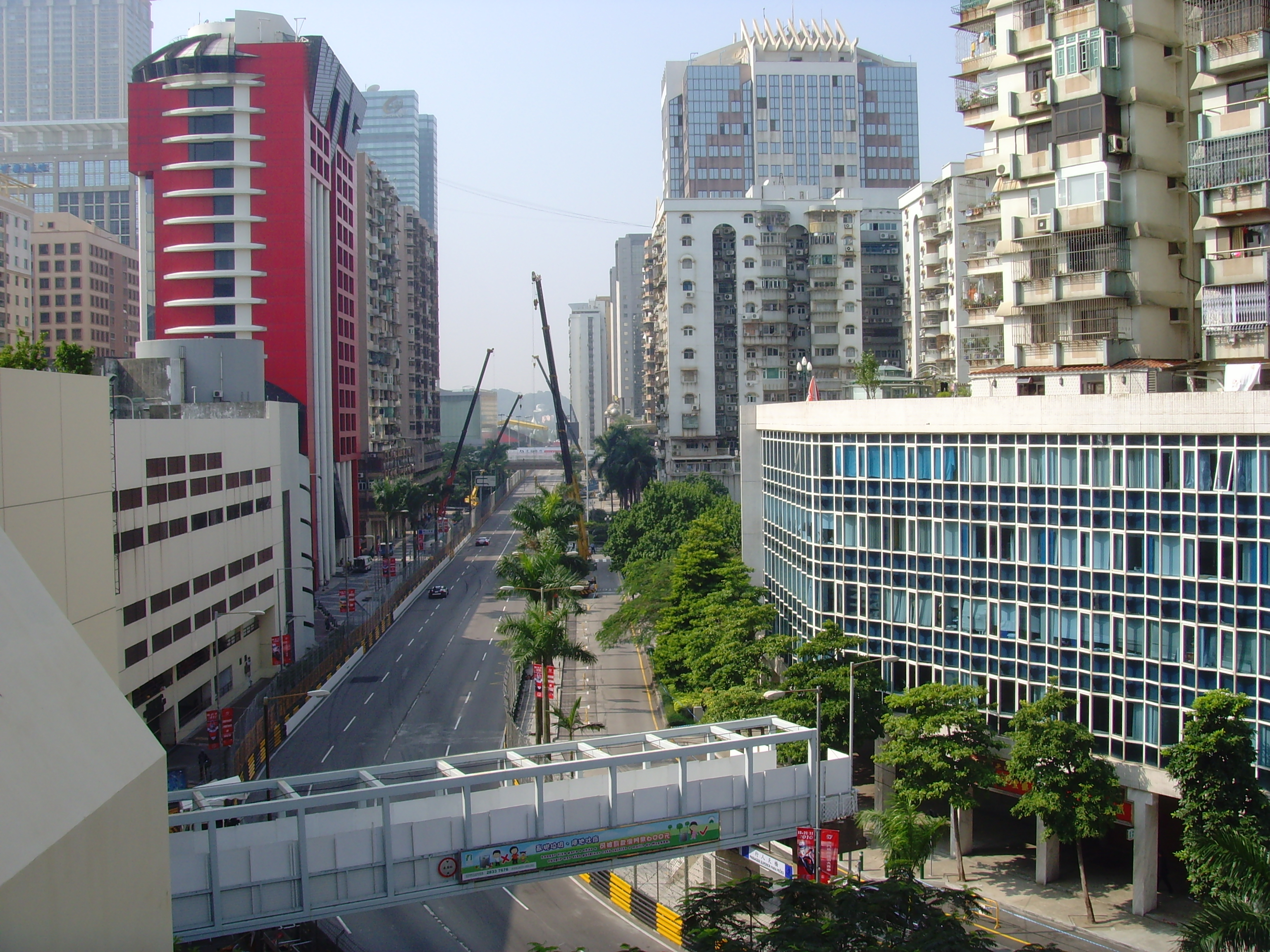
The Guia Circuit, where the race was held

The Macau Grand Prix is a Formula Three race considered to be a stepping stone to higher motor racing categories such as Formula One and is Macau's most prestigious international sporting event. The 2017 Macau Grand Prix was the 64th running of the event, the 35th time the race was held to Formula Three regulations and the 2nd edition of the FIA F3 World Cup. It took place on the 6.2 km (3.9 mi) 22-turn Guia Circuit on 19 November 2017 with three preceding days of practice and qualifying. The Guia Circuit underwent modifications following the 2016 event with several kerbs modified for safety purposes along with the installation of TecPro barriers and the strengthening of recovery protocols for stranded vehicles. After being sidelined by Pirelli for the 2016 race, Yokohama was reinstated as the event's official tyre supplier. Yokohama organised a test session with the 2017 Formula Three aerodynamic package to prevent a driver or team from gaining an unfair advantage.

In order to compete in Macau, drivers had to compete in a Fédération Internationale de l'Automobile (FIA)-regulated championship meeting during the calendar year, in either the FIA Formula Three European Championship or one of the domestic championships, with drivers placed high up in the rankings of these respective championships given priority in receiving an invitation to the meeting. Within the Formula Three record-low 22-car grid for the event, only one of the major Formula Three series was represented by their respective champion. Lando Norris, the Formula Three European champion, was this sole representative as the Japanese series winner Mitsunori Takaboshi was not entered for the race. It marked the first time since the 2014 edition that the overall champion of the All-Japan Formula Three series did not race in Macau. Seven drivers outside of Formula Three entered the race through invitations: they were Formula Two race winner Sérgio Sette Câmara, Eurocup Formula Renault 2.0 competitors Dan Ticktum and Sacha Fenestraz, All-Japan Formula Three national class champion Ryuji "Dragon" Kumita, Super GT racer Kenta Yamashita and Super Formula driver Yuhi Sekiguchi.

== Practice and qualifying ==
There were two 40-minute practice sessions preceding the Sunday race: one on Thursday morning and one on Friday morning. Sette Câmara set the fastest time for Motopark in the closing minutes of the opening practice session with a lap of 2 minutes, 14.808 seconds, one-tenth of a second faster than any one else. His closest challenger was teammate Joel Eriksson in second. Ticktum, Pedro Piquet and Ferdinand Habsburg, the Theodore Racing by Prema duo of Guanyu Zhou and Callum Ilott, Norris, Mick Schumacher and Yamashita followed in positions three through ten. Jehan Daruvala's session ended early when he hit the barriers at Moorish corners and Maximilian Günther lost a large amount of time in the pit lane as his car needed gearbox repairs. Eriksson narrowly avoided damaging his car when he slid sideways at Fisherman's Bend while Norris regained control of his at Lisboa corner. Kumita crashed into the tyre barriers at Police corner, ending the session early.

Qualifying was split into two sessions; the first was held on Thursday afternoon and ran for 40 minutes with the second held on Friday afternoon and lasted for half an hour. The fastest time set by each driver from either session counted towards his final starting position for the qualification race. The first qualifying session had Norris at the top of the time sheets with a lap of 2 minutes, 11.570 seconds after he improved on his own personal best. He was fastest in the circuit's mountain section but admitted to the press most of his advantage came out on new rear tyres at his pit stop after struggling to locate a decent car balance. Norris was nine-tenths of a second faster than the second-placed Pedro Piquet after he fitted new tyres to his vehicle. Günther was second but fell to third in spite of improving his fastest lap time on worn tyres. Ticktum ended up provisionally fourth and was narrowly in front of teammate Eriksson in fifth. Sekguicki finished sixth, with Fenestraz the best-placed rookie in seventh and he was followed closely in the time sheets by Sette Câmara. Zhou and Yamashita rounded out the top ten. Following them were Ralf Aron, Schumacher with Tadasuke Makino and Habsburg, Daruvala, Marino Sato, Devlin DeFrancesco, Ritomo Miyata, Álex Palou, and the Japanese duo of Kumita and Sekiguchi who both failed to register a lap time. The session was tumultuous and was stopped four times: Kumita crashed at San Francisco Bend early on, and shortly after the restarted, a second red flag was necessitated for Palou who went into the wall at Paiol turn and stopped on the circuit. Sette Câmara went into the barriers heavily at Fisherman's Bend with his car's rear, prompting a one-hour delay before running could resume. First qualifying was prematurely ended with less than two minutes remaining because of Daruvala impacting the wall at San Francisco Bend.

After cracking a bone his left hand, Kumita was withdrawn for the rest of the weekend. In the second 40-minute practice session, Ticktum led the way early on with a benchmark lap time and held it for most of the session until Eriksson had two new tyres fitted to his car's left-hand side to claim the top spot in the closing minutes with a lap of 2 minutes, 12.032 seconds. Ticktum followed 0.110 seconds adrift in second and Habsburg improved late in practice to finish third-fastest. Ilott was satisfied with alterations to his car and was fourth with a late lap that put him ahead of teammate Günther in fifth. After his car was repaired by his mechanics overnight, Sette Câmara was sixth and Norris seventh. Sekiguchi, Zhou and Darvala completed the top ten. Piquet swiped the barriers and removed the car's front left corner but returned to the pit lane. This caused the session's first stoppage as debris was left on the track. A second red flag was prompted when Schumacher lost control of his vehicle, locked his tyres at Police corner and hit the wall. The final stoppage came when Aron went into the wall at Moorish Hill turn.

In the second qualifying session, the first red flag came out when Daruvala crashed at the Solitude Esses complex. Soon after, Sette Câmara crashed for a second time at Fisherman's Bend and this prompted the second stoppage of the session. Ticktum was the early pace setter before Norris returned to the top of the time sheets on a new set of tyres by being the first driver to go into the two minutes and 10 seconds range more than halfway through. Eriksson fitted four new tyres to his car and found a gap between traffic to better Norris's time with a lap of 2 minutes, 10.720 seconds. With five minutes left, Zhou hit the wall and stopped with heavy damage to his vehicle, causing the session's third stoppage. Norris and Eriksson elected not to venture onto the track at the restart after Seguicki ended the session early by crashing. Thus, Eriksson became the sixth Swedish driver to secure pole position at the Macau Grand Prix. (Note: The other five Swedish drivers to start from pole position in the Macau Grand Prix are Stefan Johansson, Rickard Rydell, Björn Wirdheim, Marcus Ericsson and Felix Rosenqvist.) Norris was 0.027 seconds behind in third and Ilott was hindered by slower traffic and oversteer and settled for third having been eighth beforehand. Günther dropped one position from his provisional grid slot to start from fourth. Habsburg damaged his suspension after hitting the wall but limped back to the pit lane. Habsburg fell to fifth due to Ilott improving his position and him choosing not to venture onto the track at the restart. Ticktum was bulked by the slow-moving Habsburg but his earlier effort placed him sixth with Schumacher the best placed rookie in seventh. The top ten was completed by Sekiguchi, Sette Câmara and Zhou. Behind them the rest of the field lined up as Fenestraz, Makino, Piquet, DeFrancesco, Sato, Yamashita, Aron, Tsuboi, Daravala, Miyata and Palou.

=== Qualifying classification ===
Each of the driver's fastest lap times from the two qualifying sessions are denoted in bold.

Final qualifying classification
Pos	No.	Driver	Team	Q1 Time	Rank	Q2 Time	Rank	Gap	Grid
1	15	(Sweden) Joel Eriksson	Motopark	2:13.637	5	**2:10.720**	1	—	1
2	1	(United Kingdom) Lando Norris	Carlin	2:11.570	1	**2:10.744**	2	+0.024	2
3	7	(United Kingdom) Callum Ilott	Theodore Racing by Prema	2:13.739	6	**2:10.810**	3	+0.090	3
4	9	(Germany) Maximilian Günther	Theodore Racing by Prema	2:12.619	3	**2:11.156**	4	+0.436	4
5	3	(Austria) Ferdinand Habsburg	Carlin	2:14.688	14	**2:11.245**	5	+0.525	5
6	18	(United Kingdom) Dan Ticktum	Motopark	2:13.317	4	**2:11.437**	6	+0.717	6
7	10	(Germany) Mick Schumacher	Theodore Racing by Prema	2:14.608	12	**2:11.483**	7	+0.763	7
8	22	(Japan) Yuhi Sekiguchi	B-Max Racing Team	No time	—	**2:11.559**	8	+0.839	8
9	19	(Brazil) Sérgio Sette Câmara	Motopark	2:13.884	8	**2:11.569**	9	+0.849	9
10	8	(China) Guanyu Zhou	Theodore Racing by Prema	2:14.055	9	**2:11.781**	10	+1.061	10
11	5	(France) Sacha Fenestraz	Carlin	2:13.818	7	**2:11.929**	11	+1.160	11
12	16	(Japan) Tadasuke Makino	Motopark	2:14.670	13	**2:11.929**	12	+1.209	12
13	26	(Brazil) Pedro Piquet	Van Amersfoort Racing	2:12.482	2	**2:12.050**	13	+1.330	13
14	6	(Canada) Devlin DeFrancesco	Carlin	2:15.977	18	**2:12.349**	14	+1.629	14
15	17	(Japan) Marino Sato	Motopark	2:15.416	17	**2:12.558**	15	+1.838	15
16	21	(Japan) Kenta Yamashita	B-Max Racing Team	2:14.281	10	**2:12.563**	16	+1.843	16
17	25	(Estonia) Ralf Aron	Van Amersfoort Racing	2:14.347	11	**2:12.644**	17	+1.924	17
18	11	(Japan) Sho Tsuboi	Team TOM'S	2:15.085	16	**2:13.604**	18	+2.884	18
19	2	(India) Jehan Daruvala	Carlin	2:14.868	15	**2:13.710**	19	+2.990	19
20	12	(Japan) Ritomo Miyata	Team TOM'S	2:17.482	19	**2:13.721**	20	+3.001	20
21	20	(Japan) Álex Palou	ThreeBond Racing	2:17.992	20	**2:13.863**	21	+3.143	21
Did not qualify
–	23	(Japan) Ryuji Kumita	B-Max Racing Team	No time	—	No time	—	—	—
**Bold time** indicates the faster of the two times that determined the grid order.

== Qualification race ==
The qualifying race to set the grid order for the main race started at 10:20 Macau Standard Time (UTC+08:00) on 18 November. On the grid, in dry and cloudy weather, Eriksson maintained the lead into the first turn. Norris was slow off the line and Ilott overtook him for second place. Günther followed suit and overtook the slow moving Norris for third position. At the end of the first lap Eriksson led Ilott by 1.127 seconds. Sette Câmara passed Habsburg to take fourth into Lisboa corner on lap two. He then slipstreamed onto the back of Günther and overtook him for third place on the next lap. Habsburg lost a further position to Ticktum on the same lap and fell behind Schumacher who overtook him braking for Lisboa on the fourth lap. Schumacher locked his tyres driving towards Lisboa corner as he attempted to overtake Habsburg for sixth and ran onto the turn's escape to allow him to continue driving. The gap between the first two drivers remained stable over the next three laps until Ilott drew closer to Eriksson and got onto the latter's slipstream by the end of the fifth lap. Ilott immediately attempted to overtake on Eriksson on the outside of Lisboa corner but failed to pass.

"We started quite strong as I got up to second from third which was not too bad. Then in the middle part of the race I had a good pace and I got past Joel for P1. After that I managed to pull away. It was a good race, even quite relaxing at the end. I'm really happy for the result. Thank you SJM Theodore Racing by Prema, they did a great job and it should be good for tomorrow too"

— Callum Ilott, talking about his victory in the qualification race.

Ilott remained close behind Eriksson on the following lap and elected to stay back until he exited the Mandarin Bend kink before attempting a pass on Eriksson who had worn tyres. This allowed Eriksson to cover the inside and keep the lead when the duo drew alongside each other braking for Lisboa corner. Ilott had a large amount of momentum on Eriksson, that at the start of lap seven, he passed Eriksson on the inside at the Mandarin Bend kink for the lead. After he was overtaken by Ilott, Eriksson immediately came under pressure from his teammate Sette Câmara. Norris fell to ninth after his slow getaway and overtook Ticktum to return to the top five on lap seven but then slowed without warning and fell down the order. Ilott opened up a lead of nearly eight seconds and crossed the start/finish line after ten laps to win the qualification race and pole position for the Grand Prix itself. He was joined on the front row of the grid by Eriksson who fended off consecutive overtaking attempts from Sette Câmara. Behind the trio, Günther followed with Habsburg in fifth. Piquet, Norris and Ticktum were in close formation for positions six to eight and Sekiguchi and Zhou were similarly close to round out the top ten. Yamashita, Fenestraz, Aron, the Japanese duo of Sato and Tsuboi, Daruvala, Makino, Palou, Miyata, Schumacher and DeFrancesco (delayed by an unnoticed incident) completed the 21 classified finishers.

=== Qualifying race classification ===
Final qualification race classification
Pos	No.	Driver	Team	Laps	Time/Retired	Grid
1	7	(United Kingdom) Callum Ilott	Theodore Racing by Prema	10	22:18.077	3
2	15	(Sweden) Joel Eriksson	Motopark	10	+7.957	1
3	19	(Brazil) Sérgio Sette Câmara	Motopark	10	+8.643	9
4	9	(Germany) Maximilian Günther	Theodore Racing by Prema	10	+9.798	4
5	3	(Austria) Ferdinand Habsburg	Carlin	10	+10.391	5
6	26	(Brazil) Pedro Piquet	Van Amersfoort Racing	10	+10.821	13
7	1	(United Kingdom) Lando Norris	Carlin	10	+11.966	2
8	18	(United Kingdom) Dan Ticktum	Motopark	10	+12.657	6
9	22	(Japan) Yuhi Sekiguchi	B-Max Racing Team	10	+13.418	8
10	8	(China) Guanyu Zhou	Theodore Racing by Prema	10	+14.715	10
11	21	(Japan) Kenta Yamashita	B-Max Racing Team	10	+15.505	16
12	5	(France) Sacha Fenestraz	Carlin	10	+17.608	11
13	25	(Estonia) Ralf Aron	Van Amersfoort Racing	10	+19.371	17
14	17	(Japan) Marino Sato	Motopark	10	+25.456	15
15	11	(Japan) Sho Tsuboi	Team TOM'S	10	+26.614	18
16	2	(India) Jehan Daruvala	Carlin	10	+30.412	19
17	16	(Japan) Tadasuke Makino	Motopark	10	+32.173	12
18	20	(Japan) Álex Palou	ThreeBond Racing	10	+32.606	21
19	12	(Japan) Ritomo Miyata	Team TOM'S	10	+37.061	20
20	10	(Germany) Mick Schumacher	Theodore Racing by Prema	10	+37.634	7
21	6	(Canada) Devlin DeFrancesco	Carlin	10	+51.177	14
Fastest lap: Dan Ticktum, 2:12.281, 166.55 km/h (103.55 mph) on lap 3

== Main race ==
The race started at 15:30 local time on 19 November. The weather was cloudy and dry although some rain had fallen earlier in the day. Eriksson made a brisk start and clung onto the slipstream of pole position starter Ilott heading towards Lisboa corner and moved into first place. Competitive racing was temporarily suspended with a full course yellow flag on the second lap after Sato crashed at the kink going into the entry for Fisherman's Bend. As the field were travelling down the straight heading towards Lisboa corner, the green flags were waved to signal to drivers that racing resumed. This appeared to catch out race leaders Ilott and Eriksson, with Ilott steering into the corner earlier than anticipated and making contact with the front-left suspension on Eriksson's car. Eriksson reached the turn in first position but the damage to his car meant he retired from the Grand Prix after he stopped before the tyre barrier at San Francisco Hill a few hundred metres later. The incident allowed Sette Câmara into the lead with Günther moving into second and the Carlin pairing of Habsburg and Norris inherited third and fourth places. Eriksson's stranded car necessitated a second full course yellow flag, which was later converted to a safety car because he was deemed to be in a dangerous position.

Ilott made a pit stop for repairs to his car under the safety car while Schumacher had gearbox issues that needed tending to. The race restarted on the seventh lap with Sette Câmara ahead of Günther, Habsburg, Norris and Ticktum. Günther could not get back up to speed, allowing Sette Câmara to establish a healthy lead and the former came under attack from Habsburg. DeFrancesco was another retiree when he went into the barriers at Lisboa corner after ten laps. On the 11th lap, Habsburg used the slipstream of Günther and the braking area at the Lisboa turn to overtake him for second position. He set about reducing Sette Câmara's two-second lead over the rest of the field. Meanwhile, Ticktum pressured Norris. Ticktum used a four-wide battle of Norris, Günther and Aron into Lisboa corner for third place on the Grand Prix's 14th lap and slipstreamed past both into third place. As the leading two started the final lap, Habsburg drew close to Sette Câmara into Mandarin corner. Habsburg's higher straight-line speed allowed him to attempt a pass to the left of Sette Câmara heading into Lisboa corner. Despite drawing alongside Sette Câmara, he did not take the lead in the braking zone as the latter held onto the position on the inside.

As the two cars slid in the mountain complex, Habsburg could not take the lead due to a lack of on-track space. Habsburg however got a fast exit leaving the penultimate turn and used the momentum on the straight linking the Melco and Fisherman's Bend corners to challenge Sette Câmara. Habsburg passed Sette Câmara on the outside for the lead but, in an attempt to brake later than each other, both drivers braked too late for the corner, drove onto some dust and understeered into the barriers on the left of Fisherman's Bend. Habsburg ricocheted off the wall and managed to limp to the line, whilst Sette Câmara was left stranded in the tyre wall. Thus, in his third Formula Three race, Ticktum inherited the lead and swerved to avoid hitting debris to win the race. Norris finished half a second later in second and Aron completed the podium in third having moved up ten from his starting position. Off the podium, Habsburg limped his car which had its left-front suspension deranged to fourth ahead of Günther in fifth. Piquet took sixth place ahead of Fenestraz and Zhou. The top ten was rounded out by Makino and Daruvala. Outside the top ten, Palou finished 11th having moved up seven from his starting position, in front of Miyata and the stricken Sette Câmara. Tsuboi, Ilott and Schumacher were the last of the classified finishers.

=== Post-race ===
The top three drivers appeared on the podium to collect their trophies and spoke to the media in a later press conference. Ticktum spoke of a "pretty unlucky weekend" for himself before the Sunday race and admitted that his victory was serendipitous, owing to the Sette Câmara and Habsburg crash on the final lap, "I was due a bit of luck with what happened at the final corner. But there are no words to describe what it was like coming across the line." He thanked Red Bull motorsport adviser Helmut Marko for signing him and said he sought to improve himself, "I think if you are a second-year driver in the Red Bull programme, then Helmut has established that you are bloody fast – unless something else has gone wrong with the team and he cannot quite gauge what the driver is doing." Though Norris congratulated Ticktum for his victory he spoke of his disappointment over not winning, but expressed a desire to return to Macau in 2018 and sought an improvement in his tyre's life span, "I came to Macau to win, and in some ways I didn't prepare for it as much as I should have done and maybe I could have done – because I was focusing on other things" Third-placed Aron said of his achievement, "It could be said that it was a happy one too, but that's Macau. Macau's always the race that everyone wants to win, and it often ends with silly maneuvers. I finally got the third place, probably a tenth, but it was time for luck to finally end up on my side."

Habsburg spoke of his pride on his weekend and stated that he was "100 percent" unwilling to finish second as he attempted to put off Sette Câmara on the final lap, "I was crying when I crashed, because I knew I'd lost it. and I was wiping my tears away. But I don't think you can say you've lost it when you've thrown everything into winning it at the final corner. The move was either win or crash – and for me it was crash." Sette Câmara revealed he lost aerodynamic grip just before his crash, "It hurts a lot, it is not easy. But it's a World Cup, it's not a championship. Either you win or you lose, I do not have to get upset about it." Eriksson apportioned blame for his crash on Ilott, who received a ten-second penalty from the stewards which could not be applied since he retired, who he felt was overaggressive, "Callum crashed into me. He thought he was already past me and he was not; it was his mistake and we both had to pay the price for it." Ilott stated his belief he was unworthy of a penalty because his car's onboard footage was not made available to the stewards and it reportedly showed Eriksson steering left. He argued he provided Eriksson with enough room and stated his belief he had passed the latter before the collision.

=== Main race classification ===
Final main race classification
Pos	No.	Driver	Team	Laps	Time/Retired	Grid
1	18	(United Kingdom) Dan Ticktum	Motopark	15	39:56.648	8
2	1	(United Kingdom) Lando Norris	Carlin	15	+0.568	7
3	25	(Estonia) Ralf Aron	Van Amersfoort Racing	15	+1.763	13
4	3	(Austria) Ferdinand Habsburg	Carlin	15	+1.953	5
5	9	(Germany) Maximilian Günther	Theodore Racing by Prema	15	+4.463	4
6	26	(Brazil) Pedro Piquet	Van Amersfoort Racing	15	+5.141	6
7	5	(France) Sacha Fenestraz	Carlin	15	+5.386	12
8	8	(China) Guanyu Zhou	Theodore Racing by Prema	15	+6.483	10
9	16	(Japan) Tadasuke Makino	Motopark	15	+7.626	17
10	2	(India) Jehan Daruvala	Carlin	15	+10.455	16
11	20	(Japan) Álex Palou	Threebond Racing	15	+27.160	18
12	12	(Japan) Ritomo Miyata	Team TOM'S	15	+43.746	19
13	19	(Brazil) Sérgio Sette Câmara	Motopark	14	Accident	3
14	11	(Japan) Sho Tsuboi	Team TOM'S	14	+1 Lap	15
15	7	(United Kingdom) Callum Ilott	Theodore Racing by Prema	13	+2 Laps	1
16	10	(Germany) Mick Schumacher	Theodore Racing by Prema	13	+2 Laps	20
Ret	6	(Canada) Devlin DeFrancesco	Carlin	10	Retired	21
Ret	22	(Japan) Yuhi Sekiguchi	B-Max Racing Team	6	Retired	9
Ret	21	(Japan) Kenta Yamashita	B-Max Racing Team	6	Retired	11
Ret	15	(Sweden) Joel Eriksson	Motopark	2	Retired	2
Ret	17	(Japan) Marino Sato	Motopark	0	Retired	14
Fastest lap: Mick Schumacher, 2:12.651, 166.09 km/h (103.20 mph) on lap 10

== See also ==
- 2017 FIA GT World Cup
