= Nobuharu Matsushita =

Japanese racing driver

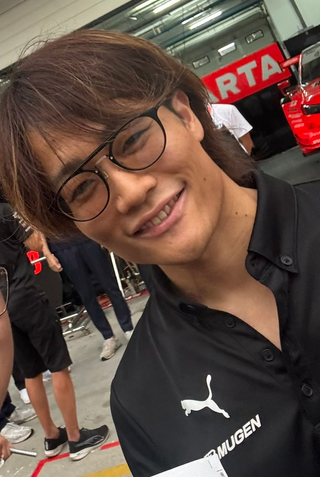
- Matsushita at the 2025 Super GT Malaysia Festival
- Nationality: (Japan) Japanese
- Born: 13 October 1993 (age 33) Saitama, Japan

Super GT - GT500 career
- Debut season: 2021
- Current team: ARTA
- Car number: 8
- Former teams: Team Impul, Real Racing
- Starts: 40
- Wins: 3
- Podiums: 10
- Poles: 1
- Fastest laps: 0
- Best finish: 4th in 2022

Previous series
- 2020–2024 2017, 2019-20 2015–2016 2015-16 2013–14 2012 2011: Super Formula; FIA F2; GP2 Series; MRF Challenge; All-Japan Formula Three; Formula Challenge Japan; Formula Pilota China

Championship titles
- 2014 2012: All-Japan Formula Three; Formula Challenge Japan

Nobuharu Matsushita (松下信治, Matsushita Nobuharu; born 13 October 1993) is a Japanese racing driver currently competing in Super GT for ARTA and Super Formula for TGM Grand Prix.

== Early career ==
=== Karting ===
Born in Saitama, Matsushita began his racing career in karting in 2005, competing the All-Japan Junior Kart Championship. In 2008, he clinched the championship title in the Open Masters Kart ARTA Challenge. He ended his karting participations in 2010, finishing third in the KF1 category of the All Japan Kart Championship.

=== Formula Pilota China and Formula Challenge Japan ===
In 2011, Matsushita graduated to single–seaters into the Formula Pilota China with the Super License team. He missed the Ordos round, but after his returning he showed better performance than in the first part of the season. He won the final race of the season at Sepang and finished the season fourth.

For 2012, Matsushita switched to the Formula Challenge Japan mono-series. He scored ten podiums in twelve races, including five wins and took the championship title.

=== All-Japan Formula Three ===
==== 2013 ====
In 2013, Matsushita stepped up to the All-Japan Formula Three Championship with the HFDP Racing. He collected five podiums and another seven point-scoring finishes, to end the season fifth in the series standings, it was the best result for the Honda driver.

==== 2014 ====
For the next season, Matsushita decided to stay in the series with the same team. He was victorious at Motegi, Fuji and Sugo, grabbing the championship title from Kenta Yamashita with a twelve-point gap.

=== GP2 Series and FIA Formula 2 ===
==== 2015 ====
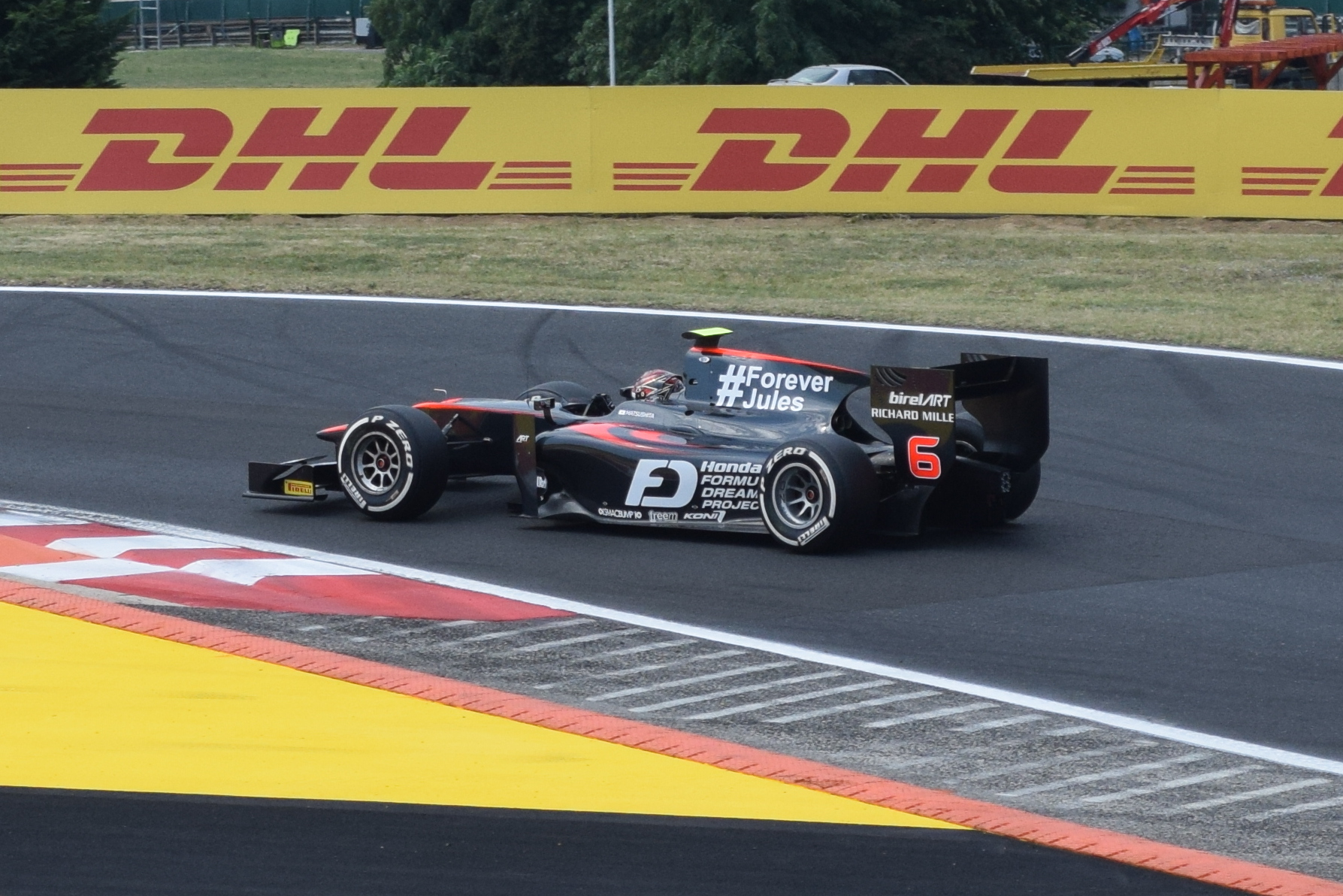
Matsushita in GP2 (Hungary 2015)

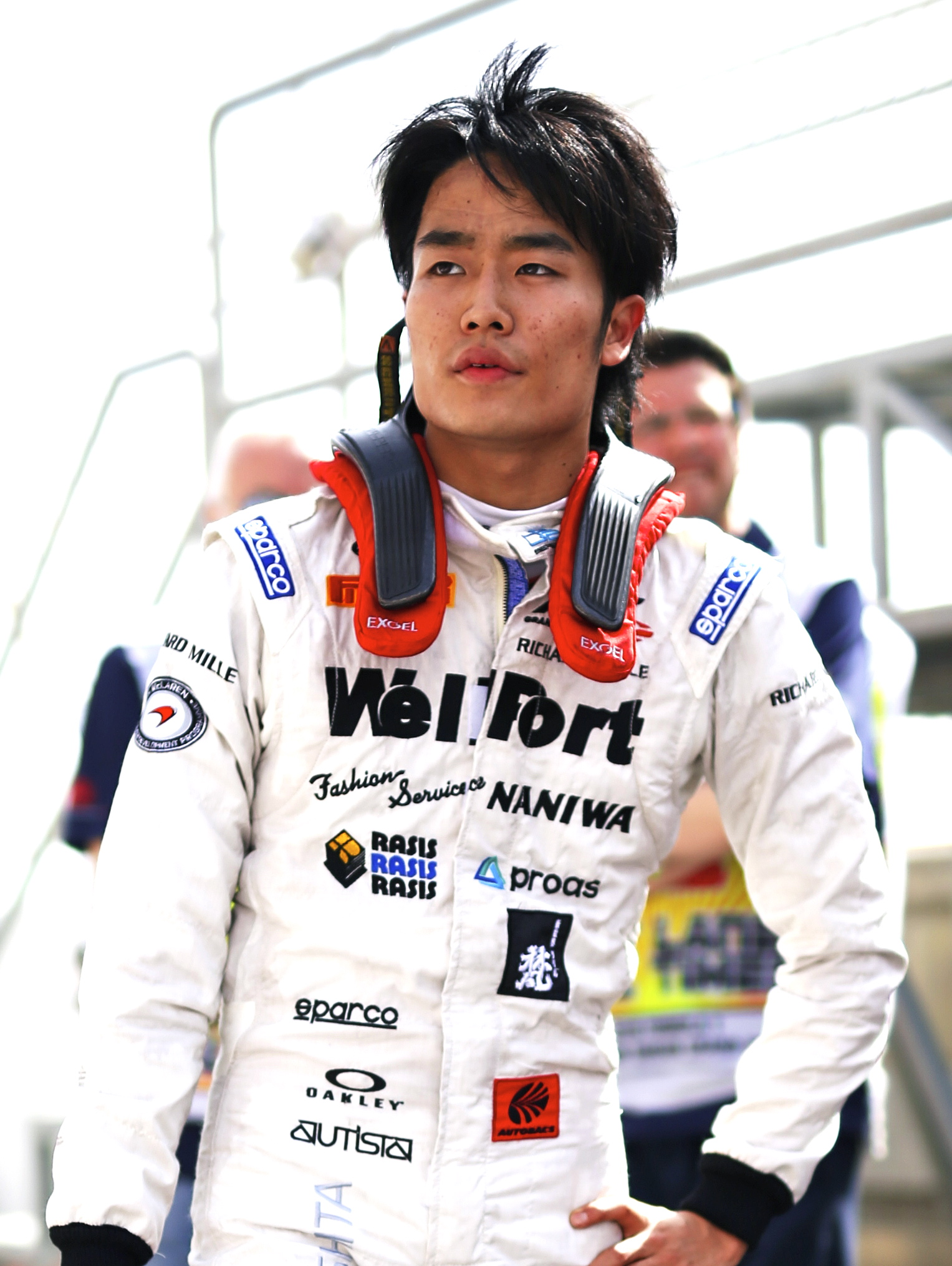
Matsushita in 2015

Matsushita made his début in the GP2 Series in 2015 with ART Grand Prix. In the first race at Bahrain, he qualified second on the grid opposite teammate Stoffel Vandoorne and finished in the points in both races, setting the fastest lap in the sprint race. At the Red Bull Ring, Matsushita took his first GP2 podium by finishing third in the sprint race. He took his first victory in the sport in the sprint race at the Hungaroring as part of an ART 1–2. He finished ninth in the overall standings.

==== 2016 ====
In February 2016, it was announced Matsushita would reunite with ART for a second season, alongside fellow 2015 rookie Sergey Sirotkin. Matsushita was suspended for the fourth round of the season in Austria due to erratic driving at the previous event in Baku.

==== 2017 ====
In 2017, Matsushita competed in the inaugural Formula 2 championship, driving for ART Grand Prix alongside Alex Albon. He scored his first win in the sprint race in Spain, and his second one during the sprint race in Hungary. He scored two more podiums, in Monaco and in Monza and finished sixth in the final standings, beating Albon by 45 points.

==== 2019 ====
Matsushita returned to Formula 2 in 2019 with the Carlin team, partnering Louis Delétraz. He won the feature races at the Red Bull Ring and in Monza. He, again, finished sixth in the championship, two positions above his teammate.

==== 2020 ====
Matsushita was announced to drive for MP Motorsport in the 2020 FIA Formula 2 Championship together with Brazilian Felipe Drugovich. Matsushita announced that he would be leaving the F2 Championship with immediate effect on 22 September 2020.

=== Formula One ===
On 20 February 2016, Matsushita was signed as a development driver for McLaren.

== Super Formula and Super GT career ==
=== Super Formula ===
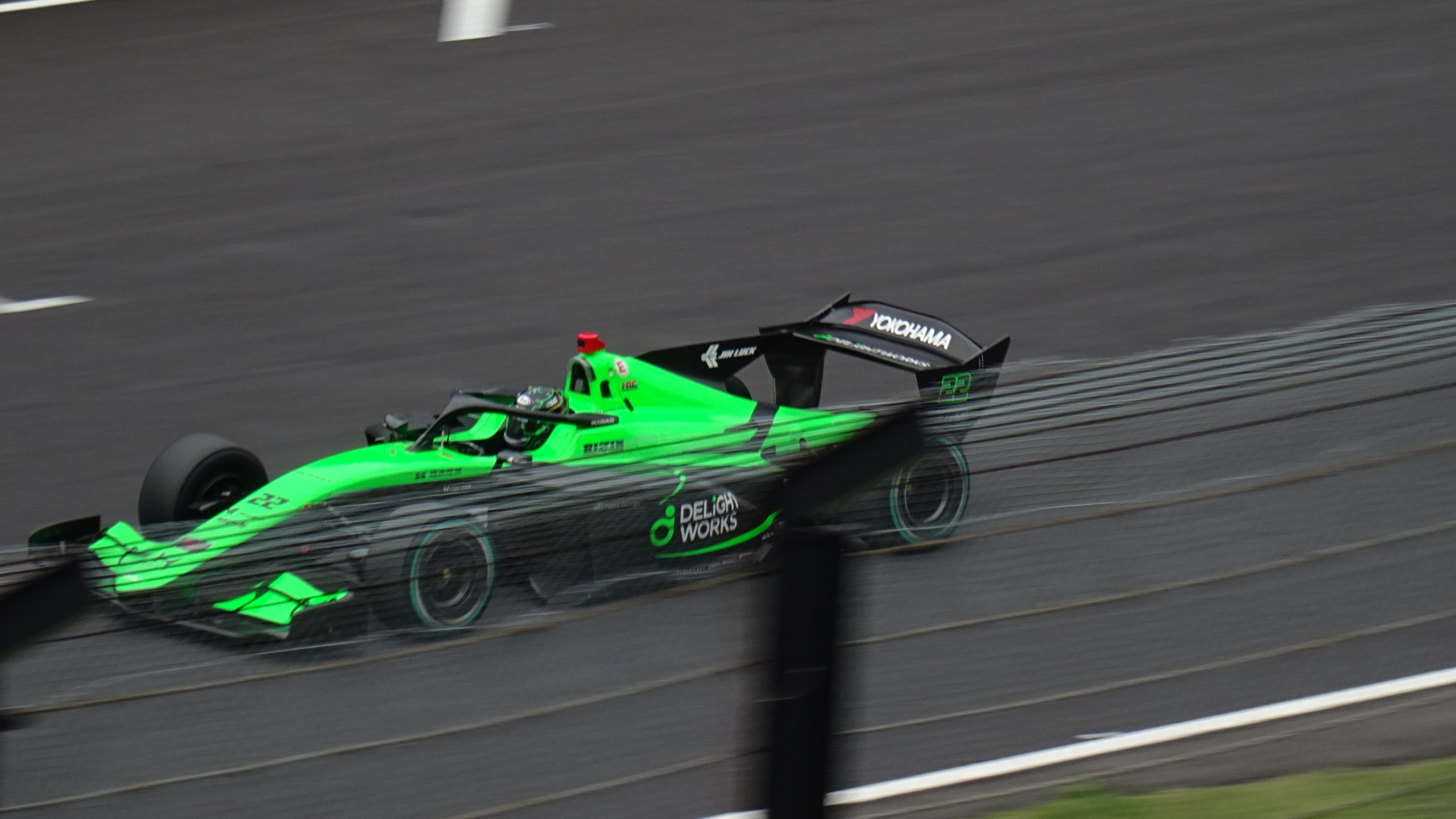
Matsushita at the Suzuka Circuit in the 2026 season

In 2018, Matsushita returned to Japan to compete in Super Formula for Honda team Dandelion. He returned to the series in 2020 racing with B-Max Racing, where he replaced Sérgio Sette Câmara who moved to Formula E. He continued racing with B-Max once again, and competed from the second round onwards. For 2022, he stayed again with the same team. Matsushita clinched his first win of the series in Suzuka. For 2023, Matsushita continued racing with B-Max once again. Matsushita ended his association with B-Max as he moved to TGM Grand Prix last minute.

=== Super GT ===
==== GT300 ====
Matsushita made his debut in the Japanese Super GT Series in the last two rounds of the 2020 season, replacing Shinichi Takagi – who had sustained injuries from a crash in a Super Taikyu race – in the Honda NSX GT3 Evo of ARTA in the GT300 class. Driving alongside co-driver Toshiki Oyu, the pair finished the races at Motegi and Fuji Speedway eighth and seventh, respectively. After he left Honda, Matsushita moved to their manufacturer's rival Nissan where he stepped up to GT500 racing with Team Impul alongside Kazuki Hiramine. Both pairs won their first GT500 race, and clinched eighth in the standings. Matsushita returned to Honda, and moved to Real Racing to partner up with Koudai Tsukakoshi, switching with Bertrand Baguette who moved to the other team.

==== GT500 ====
For the 2021 season, Matsushita decided to join Nissan in the GT500 class, despite having been a Honda junior throughout his career. He was placed at Team Impul alongside Kazuki Hiramine. The duo won the fifth round at Sportsland Sugo, ending a five year win drought for the Impul team. They nearly also won round seven at Motegi, but Hiramine ran out of fuel on the final lap while leading, although he was able to coast to the finish in third. They finished the season eighth in the championship, the best result for Nissan drivers that year.

Matsushita rejoined Honda as a factory driver and signed with Astemo Real Racing to race with Koudai Tsukakoshi. Matsushita replaced Bertrand Baguette, who went to Team Impul. For two seasons, he won only one race in Autopolis 2022.

Matsushita then returned to ARTA to race with Tomoki Nojiri.

== Racing record ==
=== Career summary ===
Season	Series	Team	Races	Wins	Poles	FLaps	Podiums	Points	Position
2011	Formula Pilota China	Super License	10	1	1	2	4	89	4th
2012	Formula Challenge Japan	HFDP with ARTA	12	5	1	5	10	91	**1st**
2013	Japanese Formula 3 Championship	HFDP Racing	15	0	0	0	5	43	5th
2014	Japanese Formula 3 Championship	HFDP Racing	15	6	5	5	9	102	**1st**
2015	GP2 Series	ART Grand Prix	22	1	0	1	3	68.5	9th
2015–16	MRF Challenge Formula 2000	MRF Racing	4	2	1	3	2	80	6th
2016	GP2 Series	ART Grand Prix	20	1	0	4	2	92	11th
2016	Formula One	McLaren Honda Formula 1 Team	Development driver						
2017	FIA Formula 2 Championship	ART Grand Prix	22	2	1	2	4	131	6th
2017	Formula One	Sauber F1 Team	Development driver						
2018	Super Formula	Docomo Team Dandelion Racing	6	0	0	0	0	7	11th
2019	FIA Formula 2 Championship	Carlin	22	2	1	4	5	144	6th
2019	Euroformula Open Championship	Carlin	2	0	1	1	1	20	18th
2019	Euroformula Open Winter Series	Carlin	2	1	1	1	1	27	4th
2020	FIA Formula 2 Championship	MP Motorsport	17	1	0	1	1	42	15th
2020	Super GT - GT300	ARTA	2	0	0	0	0	7	23rd
2020	Super Formula	Buzz Racing with B-Max	4	0	0	0	1	16	15th
2021	Super GT - GT500	Team Impul	8	1	0	0	2	45	8th
2021	Super Formula	B-Max Racing	6	0	1	0	2	33.5	8th
2022	Super Formula	B-Max Racing	10	1	0	0	1	21	13th
2022	Super GT - GT500	Astemo Real Racing	8	1	0	0	3	60	4th
2023	Super Formula	B-Max Racing	9	0	0	0	0	4	19th
2023	Super GT - GT500	Astemo Real Racing	8	0	0	0	1	45	6th
2024	Super GT - GT500	ARTA	8	1	1	0	2	43	9th
2024	Super Formula	TGM Grand Prix	3	0	0	0	0	3	15th
2025	Super GT - GT500	ARTA	8	0	0	0	1	30.5	9th
2026	Super Formula	Delightworks Racing	10	0	0	0	2	27	11th*

^{*} Season still in progress.

=== Complete Formula Pilota China results ===
(key) (Races in bold indicate pole position) (Races in italics indicate fastest lap)

Year	Entrant	1	2	3	4	5	6	7	8	9	10	11	12	DC	Points
2011	Super License	GUA; 1; 9	GUA; 2; 11	SHI; 1; 6	SHI; 2; 8	SHI; 1; 6	SHI; 2; 3	ORD; 1	ORD; 2	SHT; 1; 2	SHT; 2; 4	**SEP**; **1**; 2	SEP; 2; 1	4th	89

=== Complete Formula Challenge Japan results ===
(key) (Races in bold indicate pole position) (Races in italics indicate fastest lap)

Year	Entrant	1	2	3	4	5	6	7	8	9	10	11	12	DC	Points
2012	HFDP ARTA	FUJ1; 1; 2	FUJ1; 2; 2	MOT; 1; 3	MOT; 2; 5	**FUJ2**; **1**; 1	FUJ2; 2; 1	FUJ2; 3; 1	SUZ1; 1; 1	SUZ1; 2; 15	SUZ2; 1; 2	SUZ2; 2; 1	SUZ2; 3; 2	1st	91

=== Complete Japanese Formula 3 Championship results ===
(key) (Races in bold indicate pole position) (Races in italics indicate fastest lap)

Year	Entrant	1	2	3	4	5	6	7	8	9	10	11	12	13	14	15	DC	Points
2013	HFDP Racing	SUZ; 1; 4	SUZ; 2; 5	MOT1; 1; 5	MOT1; 2; 3	MOT1; 3; 5	OKA; 1 Ret	OKA; 2 Ret	FUJ1; 1; 5	FUJ1; 2; 3	MOT2; 1; 5	MOT2; 2; 4	SUG; 1; 3	SUG; 2; 3	FUJ2; 1; 2	FUJ2; 2 Ret	5th	43
2014	HFDP Racing	SUZ; 1; 4	SUZ; 2; 4	**MOT1**; **1**; 1	**MOT1**; **2**; 1	MOT1; 3; 1	**OKA**; **1**; 2	OKA; 2; 14	FUJ1; 1; 4	**FUJ1**; **2**; 1	MOT2; 1; 4	MOT2; 2; 2	**SUG**; **1**; 1	SUG; 2; 1	FUJ2; 1; 5	FUJ2; 2; 3	1st	102

=== Complete GP2 Series/FIA Formula 2 Championship results ===
(key) (Races in bold indicate pole position) (Races in italics indicate fastest lap)

Year	Entrant	1	2	3	4	5	6	7	8	9	10	11	12	13	14	15	16	17	18	19	20	21	22	23	24	DC	Points
2015	ART Grand Prix	BHR; FEA; 10	BHR; SPR; 6	CAT; FEA; 11	CAT; SPR; 18	MON; FEA; Ret	MON; SPR; 19	RBR; FEA; 4	RBR; SPR; 3	SIL; FEA; Ret	SIL; SPR; 19	HUN; FEA; 8	HUN; SPR; 1	SPA; FEA; Ret	SPA; SPR; 15	MNZ; FEA; Ret	MNZ; SPR; 15	SOC; FEA; 10	SOC; SPR; 7	BHR; FEA; 2	BHR; SPR; Ret	YMC; FEA; 11	YMC; SPR; C			9th	68.5
2016	ART Grand Prix	CAT; FEA; 11	CAT; SPR; 8	MON; FEA; 8	MON; SPR; 1	BAK; FEA; 6	BAK; SPR; Ret	RBR; FEA; EX	RBR; SPR; EX	SIL; FEA; 6	SIL; SPR; 5	HUN; FEA; 6	HUN; SPR; Ret	HOC; FEA; 9	HOC; SPR; 12	SPA; FEA; 11	SPA; SPR; 11	MNZ; FEA; 11	MNZ; SPR; 6	SEP; FEA; Ret	SEP; SPR; 7	YMC; FEA; 2	YMC; SPR; 4			11th	92
2017	ART Grand Prix	BHR; FEA; 8	BHR; SPR; 14	CAT; FEA; 4	CAT; SPR; 1	MON; FEA; 3	MON; SPR; 7	BAK; FEA; 12	BAK; SPR; 6	RBR; FEA; 6	RBR; SPR; 14	SIL; FEA; 10	SIL; SPR; 8	HUN; FEA; 5	HUN; SPR; 1	SPA; FEA; 16	SPA; SPR; Ret	**MNZ**; **FEA**; 2	MNZ; SPR; 7	JER; FEA; 18	JER; SPR; 11	YMC; FEA; 6	YMC; SPR; 4			6th	131
2019	Carlin	BHR; FEA; 9	BHR; SPR; 12	**BAK**; **FEA**; 13	BAK; SPR; 12	CAT; FEA; 11	CAT; SPR; Ret	MON; FEA; 2	MON; SPR; 9	LEC; FEA; 9	LEC; SPR; 9	RBR; FEA; 1	RBR; SPR; 5	SIL; FEA; 9	SIL; SPR; 7	HUN; FEA; 7	HUN; SPR; 2	SPA; FEA; C	SPA; SPR; C	MNZ; FEA; 1	MNZ; SPR; 5	SOC; FEA; 6	SOC; SPR; Ret	YMC; FEA; 2	YMC; SPR; 7	6th	144
2020	MP Motorsport	RBR1; FEA; 9	RBR1; SPR; 6	RBR2; FEA; 17	RBR2; SPR; 11	HUN; FEA; 12	HUN; SPR; 11	SIL1; FEA; 10	SIL1; SPR; 7	SIL2; FEA; 11	SIL2; SPR; 18	CAT; FEA; 1	CAT; SPR; 5	SPA; FEA; Ret	SPA; SPR; DNS	MNZ; FEA; 15	MNZ; SPR; 11	MUG; FEA; 11	MUG; SPR; 14	SOC; FEA	SOC; SPR	BHR1; FEA	BHR1; SPR	BHR2; FEA	BHR2; SPR	15th	42

=== Complete MRF Challenge Formula 2000 Championship results ===
(key) (Races in bold indicate pole position) (Races in italics indicate fastest lap)

Year	1	2	3	4	5	6	7	8	9	10	11	12	13	14	DC	Points
2015–16	**ABU**; **1**; 1	ABU; 2; 5	**ABU**; **3**; 1	ABU; 4; 4	BHR; 1	BHR; 2	DUB; 1	DUB; 2	DUB; 3	DUB; 4	CHE; 1	CHE; 2	CHE; 3	CHE; 4	6th	80

=== Complete Euroformula Open Championship results ===
(key) (Races in bold indicate pole position) (Races in italics indicate fastest lap)

Year	Entrant	1	2	3	4	5	6	7	8	9	10	11	12	13	14	15	16	17	18	DC	Points
2019	Carlin Motorsport	LEC; 1	LEC; 2	PAU; 1	PAU; 2	HOC; 1	HOC; 2	SPA; 1	SPA; 2	HUN; 1 NC	**HUN**; **2**; 2	RBR; 1	RBR; 2	SIL; 1	SIL; 2	CAT; 1	CAT; 2	MNZ; 1	MNZ; 2	18th	20

=== Complete Super Formula results ===
(key) (Races in bold indicate pole position) (Races in italics indicate fastest lap)

Year	Team	Engine	1	2	3	4	5	6	7	8	9	10	11	12	DC	Points
2018	Docomo Team Dandelion Racing	Honda	SUZ; 12	AUT; C	SUG; 10	FUJ; 9	MOT; 4	OKA; 9	SUZ; 7						11th	7
2020	Buzz Racing with B-Max	Honda	MOT	OKA	SUG	AUT; 6	SUZ; Ret	SUZ; 14	FUJ; 3						15th	16
2021	B-Max Racing	Honda	FUJ	SUZ; 13	AUT; 3‡	SUG; 4	MOT; 3^{3}	MOT; 6	**SUZ**; 12^{3}						8th	33.5
2022	B-Max Racing	Honda	FUJ; Ret	FUJ; 19	SUZ; 1	AUT; 10	SUG; Ret	FUJ; Ret	MOT; 11	MOT; 11	SUZ; 17	SUZ; Ret			13th	21
2023	B-Max Racing	Honda	FUJ; 13	FUJ; 12	SUZ; 12	AUT; Ret	SUG; Ret	FUJ; 13	MOT; Ret	SUZ; 13	SUZ; 7				19th	4
2024	TGM Grand Prix	Honda	SUZ; 8	AUT; 16	SUG; 19	FUJ	MOT	FUJ	FUJ	SUZ	SUZ				15th	3
2026	Delightworks Racing	Honda	MOT; 16	MOT; 10	SUZ; 2	SUZ; 12	FUJ; 17	FUJ; 17	FUJ; 16	SUG; 16	FUJ; 19	FUJ; 3	SUZ	SUZ	11th*	27*

^{‡} Half points awarded as less than 75% of race distance was completed.
^{*} Season still in progress.

=== Complete Super GT results ===
(key) (Races in bold indicate pole position) (Races in italics indicate fastest lap)

Year	Team	Car	Class	1	2	3	4	5	6	7	8	9	DC	Points
2020	ARTA	Honda NSX GT3 Evo	GT300	FUJ	FUJ	SUZ	MOT	FUJ	SUZ	MOT; 8	FUJ; 7		23rd	7
2021	Team Impul	Nissan GT-R Nismo GT500	GT500	OKA; 10	FUJ; 9	MOT; 11	SUZ; 6	SUG; 1	AUT; 7	MOT; 3	FUJ; 9		8th	45
2022	Astemo Real Racing	Honda NSX-Type S GT500	GT500	OKA; 9	FUJ; 9‡	SUZ; 2	FUJ; 10	SUZ; 2	SUG; 12	AUT; 1	MOT; 5		4th	60
2023	Astemo Real Racing	Honda NSX-Type S GT500	GT500	OKA; 7	FUJ; 3	SUZ; 9	FUJ; 7	SUZ; 4	SUG; DSQ	AUT; 6	MOT; 3		6th	45
2024	ARTA	Honda Civic Type R-GT GT500	GT500	OKA; 8	FUJ; 14	SUZ; Ret	**FUJ**; 1	SUG; 15	AUT; 11	MOT; 2	SUZ; 12		9th	43
2025	ARTA	Honda Civic Type R-GT GT500	GT500	OKA; 7	FUJ; 9	SEP; 2	FS1 (10)	FS2; 11	SUZ; 11	SUG; 8	AUT; 10	MOT; 6	9th	30.5

^{‡} Half points awarded as less than 75% of race distance was completed.
^{(Number)} Driver did not take part in this sprint race, points are still awarded for the teammate's result.
^{*} Season still in progress.

Sporting positions
Preceded by Takamoto Katsuta	Formula Challenge Japan; Champion; 2012	Succeeded by Kenta Yamashita
Preceded by Yuichi Nakayama	All-Japan Formula Three Championship; Champion; 2014	Succeeded by Nick Cassidy
Preceded by Pierre Gasly	Super Formula; Rookie Champion; 2018	Succeeded by Álex Palou
