= 2020 Mugello Formula 2 round =

9th round of the Formula 2 Championship

(Italy) 2020 Mugello Formula 2 round
Round details
- Round 9 of 12 in the 2020 FIA Formula 2 Championship.
- Layout of the Autodromo Internazionale del Mugello
- Location: Mugello Circuit, Mugello, Italy
- Course: Permanent racing facility 5.245 km (3.259 mi)

Feature race
- Date: 12 September 2020
- Laps: 33
Pole position
Driver	(Denmark) Christian Lundgaard	ART Grand Prix
Time	1:30.133	
Podium
First	(Russia) Nikita Mazepin	Hitech Grand Prix
Second	(Italy) Luca Ghiotto	Hitech Grand Prix
Third	(Switzerland) Louis Delétraz	Charouz Racing System
Fastest lap
Driver	(China) Guanyu Zhou	UNI-Virtuosi
- Time: 1:33.732 (on lap 21)

Sprint race
- Date: 13 September 2020
- Laps: 23
Podium
First	(Denmark) Christian Lundgaard	ART Grand Prix
Second	(Switzerland) Louis Delétraz	Charouz Racing System
Third	(Estonia) Jüri Vips	DAMS
Fastest lap
Driver	(United Kingdom) Dan Ticktum	DAMS
- Time: 1:33.295 (on 18)

The 2020 Mugello FIA Formula 2 round was a pair of motor races for Formula 2 cars that took place on 12-13 September 2020 at the Mugello Circuit in Mugello, Italy as part of the FIA Formula 2 Championship. It was the ninth round of the 2020 FIA Formula 2 Championship and ran in support of the 2020 Tuscan Grand Prix.

== Report ==
Lundgaard achieved his first pole position in qualifying, but he was not successful in the race. For the first time since 2018 Sakhir Formula 2 round a team scored a one-two in the feature race with Mazepin first and Ghiotto second. Ghiotto also broke the record for the most podiums in Formula 2 history with 24. Both Ilott and Shwartzman failed to score points in the feature race, while Schumacher, by finishing in fifth, led the championship for the first time.

The sprint race was won by Lundgaard ahead of Louis Delétraz and Jüri Vips. This was Vips' first podium in Formula 2. Finishing ahead of his closest rivals Ilott and Shwartzman, Mick Schumacher extended his championship lead.

== Classification ==
=== Qualifying ===
Pos.	No.	Driver	Team	Time	Gap	Grid
1	6	(Denmark) Christian Lundgaard	ART Grand Prix	1:30.133		1
2	2	(United Kingdom) Dan Ticktum	DAMS	1:30.138	+0.005	2
3	4	(United Kingdom) Callum Ilott	UNI-Virtuosi	1:30.204	+0.071	3
4	5	(New Zealand) Marcus Armstrong	ART Grand Prix	1:30.317	+0.184	4
5	15	(Brazil) Felipe Drugovich	MP Motorsport	1:30.339	+0.206	5
6	8	(India) Jehan Daruvala	Carlin	1:30.437	+0.304	6
7	1	(Estonia) Jüri Vips	DAMS	1:30.486	+0.353	7
8	25	(Italy) Luca Ghiotto	Hitech Grand Prix	1:30.508	+0.375	8
9	21	(Russia) Robert Shwartzman	Prema Racing	1:30.527	+0.394	9
10	9	(United Kingdom) Jack Aitken	Campos Racing	1:30.533	+0.400	10
11	7	(Japan) Yuki Tsunoda	Carlin	1:30.542	+0.409	11
12	11	(Switzerland) Louis Delétraz	Charouz Racing System	1:30.552	+0.419	12
13	3	(China) Guanyu Zhou	UNI-Virtuosi	1:30.586	+0.453	13
14	24	(Russia) Nikita Mazepin	Hitech Grand Prix	1:30.592	+0.459	14
15	20	(Germany) Mick Schumacher	Prema Racing	1:30.924	+0.791	15
16	12	(Brazil) Pedro Piquet	Charouz Racing System	1:30.974	+0.841	16
17	23	(Japan) Marino Sato	Trident	1:31.131	+0.998	17
18	22	(Israel) Roy Nissany	Trident	1:31.159	+1.026	18
19	16	(Russia) Artem Markelov	BWT HWA Racelab	1:31.331	+1.198	19
20	17	(France) Giuliano Alesi	BWT HWA Racelab	1:31.345	+1.212	20
21	14	(Japan) Nobuharu Matsushita	MP Motorsport	1:31.961	+1.828	21
22	10	(Brazil) Guilherme Samaia	Campos Racing	1:32.359	+2.226	22

=== Feature race ===
Pos.	No.	Driver	Entrant	Laps	Time/Retired	Grid	Points
1	24	(Russia) Nikita Mazepin	Hitech Grand Prix	33	59:22.869	14	25
2	25	(Italy) Luca Ghiotto	Hitech Grand Prix	33	+4.460	8	18
3	11	(Switzerland) Louis Delétraz	Charouz Racing System	33	+4.519	12	15 (2)
4	15	(Brazil) Felipe Drugovich	MP Motorsport	33	+4.860	5	12
5	20	(Germany) Mick Schumacher	Prema Racing	33	+5.374	15	10
6	6	(Denmark) Christian Lundgaard	ART Grand Prix	33	+7.825	1	8 (4)
7	1	(Estonia) Jüri Vips	DAMS	33	+8.353	7	6
8	16	(Russia) Artem Markelov	BWT HWA Racelab	33	+10.172	19	4
9	5	(New Zealand) Marcus Armstrong	ART Grand Prix	33	+10.434	4	2
10	8	(India) Jehan Daruvala	Carlin	33	+10.663	6	1
11	14	(Japan) Nobuharu Matsushita	MP Motorsport	33	+11.100	21	
12	4	(United Kingdom) Callum Ilott	UNI-Virtuosi	33	+11.747	3	
13	12	(Brazil) Pedro Piquet	Charouz Racing System	33	+11.757	16	
14	23	(Japan) Marino Sato	Trident Racing	33	+12.428	17	
15	22	(Israel) Roy Nissany	Trident Racing	33	+13.588	18	
16	7	(Japan) Yuki Tsunoda	Carlin	33	+14.112^{1}	11	
17	2	(United Kingdom) Dan Ticktum	DAMS	33	+15.959	2	
18	10	(Brazil) Guilherme Samaia	Campos Racing	33	+52.196	22	
DNF	9	(United Kingdom) Jack Aitken	Campos Racing	26	Collision	10	
DNF	3	(China) Guanyu Zhou	UNI-Virtuosi	26	Collision	13	
DNF	17	(France) Giuliano Alesi	BWT HWA Racelab	21	Engine	20	
DNF	21	(Russia) Robert Shwartzman	Prema Racing	16	Engine	9	
Fastest lap： (Switzerland) Louis Delétraz (Charouz Racing System) — 1:33.969（lap 22)

Note：

- ^1 - Yuki Tsunoda originally finished the race in eighth place, but was given a five-second time penalty due to a collision with Dan Ticktum and ended up in sixteenth.

=== Sprint race ===
Pos.	No.	Driver	Entrant	Laps	Time/Retired	Grid	Points
1	6	(Denmark) Christian Lundgaard	ART Grand Prix	23	37:51.980	3	15 (2)
2	11	(Switzerland) Louis Delétraz	Charouz Racing System	23	+14.321	6	12
3	1	(Estonia) Jüri Vips	DAMS	23	+14.870	2	10
4	20	(Germany) Mick Schumacher	Prema Racing	23	+18.018	4	8
5	3	(China) Guanyu Zhou	UNI-Virtuosi	23	+18.382	20	6
6	4	(United Kingdom) Callum Ilott	UNI-Virtuosi	23	+24.421	12	4
7	8	(India) Jehan Daruvala	Carlin	23	+26.264	10	2
8	23	(Japan) Marino Sato	Trident Racing	23	+26.301	14	1
9	21	(Russia) Robert Shwartzman	Prema Racing	23	+31.425	22	
10	22	(Israel) Roy Nissany	Trident Racing	23	+32.942	15	
11	5	(New Zealand) Marcus Armstrong	ART Grand Prix	23	+34.902	9	
12	12	(Brazil) Pedro Piquet	Charouz Racing System	23	+35.040	13	
13	9	(United Kingdom) Jack Aitken	Campos Racing	23	+35.254	19	
14	14	(Japan) Nobuharu Matsushita	MP Motorsport	23	+36.983	11	
15	15	(Brazil) Felipe Drugovich	MP Motorsport	23	+39.072	5	
16	10	(Brazil) Guilherme Samaia	Campos Racing	23	+48.433	18	
17	2	(United Kingdom) Dan Ticktum	DAMS	23	+48.483	17	
18	24	(Russia) Nikita Mazepin	Hitech Grand Prix	23	+50.793	8	
19	7	(Japan) Yuki Tsunoda	Carlin	23	+1:09.649	16	
20	16	(Russia) Artem Markelov	BWT HWA Racelab	23	+1:21.885	1	
DNF	25	(Italy) Luca Ghiotto	Hitech Grand Prix	14	Collision damage	7	
DNF	17	(France) Giuliano Alesi	BWT HWA Racelab	14	Wheel	21	
Fastest lap： (Denmark) Christian Lundgaard (ART Grand Prix) — 1:34.907（lap 2)

== Standings after the event ==
Drivers' Championship standings

	Pos.	Driver	Points
1	1	(Germany) Mick Schumacher	161
1	2	(United Kingdom) Callum Ilott	153
2	3	(Denmark) Christian Lundgaard	145
1	4	(Russia) Robert Shwartzman	140
1	5	(Russia) Nikita Mazepin	127

Teams' Championship standings

Pos.	Team	Points
1	(Italy) Prema Racing	301
2	(United Kingdom) UNI-Virtuosi	261
3	(United Kingdom) Hitech Grand Prix	216
4	(France) ART Grand Prix	181
5	(United Kingdom) Carlin	149

- Note: Only the top five positions are included for both sets of standings.

== See also ==
- 2020 Tuscan Grand Prix
- 2020 Mugello Formula 3 round

Previous round: 2020 Monza Formula 2 round	FIA Formula 2 Championship; 2020 season	Next round: 2020 Sochi Formula 2 round
Previous round: 1997 International F3000 Mugello round	Mugello Formula 2 round	Next round: none
