= Sochi Formula 2 round =

(Russia) Sochi Formula 2 round

FIA Formula 2 Championship
- Venue: Sochi Autodrom
- Location: Sochi, Russia
- First race: 2018
- Last race: 2021
- Most wins (team): (France) ART Grand Prix (United Kingdom) Virtuosi Racing (Italy) Prema Racing (2)
- Lap record: 1:50.501 ( (United Kingdom) George Russell, ART Grand Prix, F2 2018, 2018)

(Russia) Sochi GP2 round
GP2 Series
- First race: 2014
- Last race: 2015
- Lap record: 1:46.407 ( (Belgium) Stoffel Vandoorne, ART Grand Prix, GP2/11, 2014)

The Sochi Formula 2 round, formerly Sochi GP2 Series round, was a FIA Formula 2 Championship series race that was run on the Sochi Autodrom track in Sochi, Russia.

== Winners ==
A green background indicates an event which was part of the GP2 Series event.

Year	Race	Driver	Team	Report
2014	Feature	(United Kingdom) Jolyon Palmer	DAMS	Report
2014	Sprint	(Denmark) Marco Sørensen	MP Motorsport	Report
2015	Feature	(United States) Alexander Rossi	Racing Engineering	Report
2015	Sprint	(New Zealand) Richie Stanaway	Status Grand Prix	Report
2018	Feature	(Thailand) Alexander Albon	DAMS	Report
2018	Sprint	(United Kingdom) George Russell	ART Grand Prix	Report
2019	Feature	(Netherlands) Nyck de Vries	ART Grand Prix	Report
2019	Sprint	(Italy) Luca Ghiotto	UNI-Virtuosi Racing	Report
2020	Feature	(Germany) Mick Schumacher	Prema Racing	Report
2020	Sprint	(China) Guanyu Zhou	UNI-Virtuosi Racing	Report
2021	Sprint1	(United Kingdom) Dan Ticktum	Carlin	Report
2021	Sprint2	Race cancelled.		Report
2021	Feature	(Australia) Oscar Piastri	Prema Racing	Report

== See also ==
- Russian Grand Prix
