= 2017 Barcelona Formula 2 round =

Motor racing competition

(Spain) 2017 Barcelona Formula 2 round
Round details
- Round 2 of 11 in the 2017 FIA Formula 2 Championship.
- Layout of the Circuit de Barcelona-Catalunya
- Location: Circuit de Barcelona-Catalunya, Montmeló, Catalonia, Spain
- Course: Permanent racing facility 4.655 km (2.892 mi)

Feature race
- Date: 13 May 2017
- Laps: 37
Pole position
Driver	(Monaco) Charles Leclerc	Prema Racing
Time	1:29.285	
Podium
First	(Monaco) Charles Leclerc	Prema Racing
Second	(Italy) Luca Ghiotto	Russian Time
Third	(United Kingdom) Oliver Rowland	DAMS
Fastest lap
Driver	(Russia) Artem Markelov	Russian Time
- Time: 1:34.294 (on lap 29)

Sprint race
- Date: 14 May 2017
- Laps: 26
Podium
First	(Japan) Nobuharu Matsushita	ART Grand Prix
Second	(United Kingdom) Oliver Rowland	DAMS
Third	(Canada) Nicholas Latifi	DAMS
Fastest lap
Driver	(Canada) Nicholas Latifi	DAMS
- Time: 1:34.811 (on lap 3)

The 2017 Barcelona FIA Formula 2 round was a pair of motor races held on 13 and 14 May 2017 at the Circuit de Barcelona-Catalunya in Montmeló, Catalonia, Spain as part of the FIA Formula 2 Championship. It was the second round of the 2017 FIA Formula 2 Championship and was run in support of the 2017 Spanish Grand Prix.

== Report ==
=== Background ===
The Catalunya round marked the second round of the season and the first to be staged within the European continent. Following the previous round in Bahrain, Charles Leclerc entered the second round as the championship leader, with Artem Markelov and Oliver Rowland in second ad third respectively. Campos Racing announced a driver-change for the Catalunya round, with former-Formula 1 driver, Roberto Merhi replacing Stefano Coletti after only one outing for the Monégasque driver. This turned out to be a one-off for Merhi, although he later returned to race with the Rapax team.

Pirelli supplied the field with P Zero Orange hard tyres and P Zero Yellow soft tyres for the round. The abrasive surface as well as the demanding nature of the track meant that tyres played a vital role in the races - as much as they did in the previous round in Bahrain.

=== Practice and qualifying ===
The conditions for practice were optimal, opening the door for fast lap times. Leclerc topped the timing sheets in free practice with a time of 1:29.974, followed closely by former teammate, Alexander Albon. Albon completed a time just 0.042 of a second off of Leclerc and given the strong performance in pre-season testing, looked set for an equally strong weekend ahead. In third was another debutant in Sergio Sette Camara, who was half a second off of Leclerc.

The immaculate conditions remained for the qualifying session, where Leclerc took his second pole position in succession. Jordan King set the initial benchmark with Nyck de Vries right behind him. As time went in qualifying, the times started to tumble until eventually Luca Ghiotto set a time of 1:29.478 to go fastest and seemed sure to be the pole position time. Elsewhere around the track, Artem Markelov's fire extinguisher let loose in his car, hampering his run and Nabil Jeffri ground to a halt, owing problems with his car. This subsequently brought out the red flag with six minutes remaining. Once the session resumed, the remainder of the field looked forward to eclipse Ghiotto's time. Alexander Albon improved his time to take fourth, but Leclerc went purple in the final two sectors to go two-tenths faster than Ghiotto and take the pole position for the second time in succession.

=== Races ===
==== Feature Race ====
Leclerc led into turn one, but found himself under fire from Ghiotto and Albon after locking up. Ghiotto lunged down the inside into turn four, but couldn't make the move stick. The battle ensued for the next few corners as Leclerc struggled to maintain a rhythm following the lock-up. Artem Markelov and Antonio Fuoco came together at the end of the first sector which caused damage to Fuoco's front wing. He along with Johnny Cecotto came in for an early pitstop owing to damage brought on in the opening laps after having run into the back of Louis Deletraz at the end of the opening lap. Leclerc began to pull away from Ghiotto, who began to fall into the clutches of Albon, who subsequently made a move into turn one and took second place from Ghiotto. Leclerc pitted on lap seven, along with Matsushita, leaving Albon with the lead of the race. Canamasas ground to a halt on lap 10 owing to problems with the car. Despite this, he did not pull off the track to retire - instead remaining on the track and gesturing to the marshals asking for a push-start. The dangerous position of the car initially brought out the virtual safety car and eventually, the safety car itself. Eventually, the mercurial Spaniard conceded defeat and retired from the race. As the race resumed, Leclerc and Ghiotto began to scythe through the pack. Rowland eventually pressured Albon into a mistake to take the lead of the race, although both still had an impending pitstop to make. Eventually, the leaders made their stops, handing the lead once again to Leclerc. With the fresh rubber, Albon and Rowland were staging a comeback with both drivers challenging for the podium toward the latter stages of the race. Rowland gained on the third-placed Matsushita and eventually passed him on the main straight with use of DRS. Jordan King and Artem Markelov engaged in an epic battle for eighth spot which ultimately saw Markelov prevail to take the spot and pole position for the sprint race. For Charles Leclerc though, the win was rather comfortable and proved once again that he and the Prema outfit looked to be the team to beat for this years championship.

==== Sprint Race ====
Nicholas Latifi made a blinder and shot through to the lead heading into turn one. Ralph Boschung stalled on the grid and contact between Nyck de Vries and Antonio Fuoco brought out the safety car before the end of the first lap. As the race resumed, Latifi maintained a relatively comfortable lead as the race remained stagnant for some laps. After a lock-up from Malja, Matsushita took second place and proceeded to pursue Latifi, whilst Rowland passed him further down the circuit. After battling for a number of laps, Leclerc finally passed Albon for fifth place and soon thereafter passed Malja for fourth. Latifi seemed to have had the race wrapped up until lap 22 when he ran wide and speared off into the gravel. He recovered and got back on track, but not before Matsushita passed him for the lead. His teammate Rowland passed him further down the circuit, as well. Matsushita remained in the lead and took his first win of the season, with the DAMS pair of Rowland and Latifi taking the remaining slots on the podium.

== Classifications ==
=== Qualifying ===
Pos.	No.	Driver	Team	Time	Gap	Grid
1	1	(Monaco) Charles Leclerc	Prema Racing	1:29.285	–	1
2	5	(Italy) Luca Ghiotto	Russian Time	1:29.478	+0.193	2
3	18	(Netherlands) Nyck de Vries	Rapax	1:29.550	+0.265	3
4	15	(United Kingdom) Jordan King	MP Motorsport	1:29.585	+0.300	4
5	8	(Thailand) Alexander Albon	ART Grand Prix	1:29.732	+0.447	5
6	9	(United Kingdom) Oliver Rowland	DAMS	1:29.744	+0.459	6
7	20	(France) Norman Nato	Arden International	1:29.790	+0.505	7
8	2	(Italy) Antonio Fuoco	Prema Racing	1:29.834	+0.549	8
9	10	(Canada) Nicholas Latifi	DAMS	1:29.885	+0.600	9
10	7	(Japan) Nobuharu Matsushita	ART Grand Prix	1:29.975	+0.690	10
11	3	(Switzerland) Louis Delétraz	Racing Engineering	1:30.046	+0.761	11
12	11	(Switzerland) Ralph Boschung	Campos Racing	1:30.065	+0.780	12
13	6	(Russia) Artem Markelov	Russian Time	1:30.177	+0.892	13
14	14	(Brazil) Sérgio Sette Câmara	MP Motorsport	1:30.231	+0.946	14
15	12	(Spain) Roberto Merhi	Campos Racing	1:30.389	+1.104	15
16	19	(Venezuela) Johnny Cecotto Jr.	Rapax	1:30.441	+1.156	16
17	21	(Indonesia) Sean Gelael	Arden International	1:30.772	+1.487	17
18	4	(Sweden) Gustav Malja	Racing Engineering	1:30.814	+1.529	18
19	17	(Spain) Sergio Canamasas	Trident	1:31.148	+1.863	19
20	16	(Malaysia) Nabil Jeffri	Trident	1:32.303	+3.018	20

=== Feature Race ===
Pos.	No.	Driver	Team	Laps	Time / Gap	Grid	Points
1	1	(Monaco) Charles Leclerc	Prema Racing	37	1:02:33.684	1	25 (4)
2	5	(Italy) Luca Ghiotto	Russian Time	37	+3.730	2	18
3	9	(United Kingdom) Oliver Rowland	DAMS	37	+11.146	6	15
4	7	(Japan) Nobuharu Matsushita	ART Grand Prix	37	+14.103	10	12
5	8	(Thailand) Alexander Albon	ART Grand Prix	37	+17.319	5	10
6	10	(Canada) Nicholas Latifi	DAMS	37	+23.879	9	8
7	4	(Sweden) Gustav Malja	Racing Engineering	37	+24.779	18	6
8	6	(Russia) Artem Markelov	Russian Time	37	+25.403	13	4 (2)
9	15	(United Kingdom) Jordan King	MP Motorsport	37	+30.967	4	2
10	18	(Netherlands) Nyck de Vries	Rapax	37	+43.832	3	1
11	3	(Switzerland) Louis Delétraz	Racing Engineering	37	+50.283	11	
12	11	(Switzerland) Ralph Boschung	Campos Racing	37	+58.201^{1}	12	
13	2	(Italy) Antonio Fuoco	Prema Racing	37	+1:05.970	8	
14	14	(Brazil) Sérgio Sette Câmara	MP Motorsport	37	+1:05.973^{2}	14	
15	21	(Indonesia) Sean Gelael	Arden International	37	+1:08.333	17	
16	20	(France) Norman Nato	Arden International	37	+1:09.241	7	
17	19	(Venezuela) Johnny Cecotto Jr.	Rapax	37	+1:27.784^{1}	16	
18	16	(Malaysia) Nabil Jeffri	Trident	37	+1:29.521	20	
19	12	(Spain) Roberto Merhi	Campos Racing	33	Brakes	15	
DNF	17	(Spain) Sergio Canamasas	Trident	8	Brakes	19	
Fastest lap: (Russia) Artem Markelov (Russian Time) – 1:46.038 (on lap 24)

Notes

1. – Ralph Boschung and Johnny Cecotto Jr. received 20-second penalties after having been deemed to have insufficiently slowed for the VSC (Virtual Safety Car).
2. – Sérgio Sette Câmara was handed a five-second time penalty during the race. Having failed to take the penalty earlier in the race, an additional five-second penalty was given.

=== Sprint Race ===
Pos.	No.	Driver	Team	Laps	Time / Gap	Grid	Points
1	7	(Japan) Nobuharu Matsushita	ART Grand Prix	26	42:20.450	5	15
2	9	(United Kingdom) Oliver Rowland	DAMS	26	+3.309	6	12
3	10	(Canada) Nicholas Latifi	DAMS	26	+4.621	3	10 (2)
4	1	(Monaco) Charles Leclerc	Prema Racing	26	+9.177	8	8
5	15	(United Kingdom) Jordan King	MP Motorsport	26	+15.333	9	6
6	4	(Sweden) Gustav Malja	Racing Engineering	26	+17.987	2	4
7	5	(Italy) Luca Ghiotto	Russian Time	26	+18.092	7	2
8	8	(Thailand) Alexander Albon	ART Grand Prix	26	+21.135	4	1
9	6	(Russia) Artem Markelov	Russian Time	26	+21.552	1	
10	19	(Venezuela) Johnny Cecotto Jr.	Rapax	26	+30.744	17	
11	17	(Spain) Sergio Canamasas	Trident	26	+31.549	20	
12	12	(Spain) Roberto Merhi	Campos Racing	26	+34.434	19	
13	20	(France) Norman Nato	Arden International	26	+35.271	16	
14	3	(Switzerland) Louis Delétraz	Racing Engineering	26	+38.090	11	
15	14	(Brazil) Sérgio Sette Câmara	MP Motorsport	26	+39.446	14	
16	21	(Indonesia) Sean Gelael	Arden International	26	+46.950	15	
17	11	(Switzerland) Ralph Boschung	Campos Racing	26	+50.226	12	
18	16	(Malaysia) Nabil Jeffri	Rapax	26	+59.912	18	
DNF	18	(Netherlands) Nyck de Vries	Rapax	0	Collision	10	
DNF	2	(Italy) Antonio Fuoco	Prema Racing	0	Collision	13	
Fastest lap: (Canada) Nicholas Latifi (DAMS) – 1:34.811 (on lap 3)

== Championship standings after the round ==
Drivers' Championship standings

	Pos.	Driver	Points
	1	(Monaco) Charles Leclerc	73
1	2	(United Kingdom) Oliver Rowland	47
1	3	(Italy) Luca Ghiotto	38
2	4	(Russia) Artem Markelov	34
5	5	(Japan) Nobuharu Matsushita	31

Teams' Championship standings

	Pos.	Team	Points
1	1	(Italy) Prema Racing	75
1	2	(France) DAMS	75
2	3	(Russia) Russian Time	72
2	4	(France) ART Grand Prix	52
	5	(Netherlands) MP Motorsport	26

- Note: Only the top five positions are included for both sets of standings.

== See also ==
- 2017 Spanish Grand Prix
- 2017 Barcelona GP3 Series round

Previous round: 2017 Sakhir Formula 2 round	FIA Formula 2 Championship; 2017 season	Next round: 2017 Monte Carlo Formula 2 round
Previous round: 2016 Catalunya GP2 Series round	Catalunya Formula 2 round	Next round: 2018 Barcelona Formula 2 round
