= 2019 Spa-Francorchamps Formula 2 round =

Formula 2 race

(Belgium) 2019 Spa-Francorchamps Formula 2 round
Round details
- Round 9 of 12 in the 2019 FIA Formula 2 Championship.
- Layout of the Circuit de Spa-Francorchamps
- Location: Circuit de Spa-Francorchamps, Stavelot, Belgium
- Course: Permanent racing facility 7.004 km (4.352 mi)

Feature race
- Date: 31 August 2019
- Laps: 25
Pole position
Driver	(Netherlands) Nyck de Vries	ART Grand Prix
Time	1:58.304	
Podium
First	Race Cancelled	N/A
Second	Race Cancelled	N/A
Third	Race Cancelled	N/A
Fastest lap
Driver	None	None
- Time: NC

Sprint race
- Date: 1 September 2019
- Laps: 18
Podium
First	Race Cancelled	N/A
Second	Race Cancelled	N/A
Third	Race Cancelled	N/A
Fastest lap
Driver	Race Cancelled	N/A
- Time: NC

The 2019 Spa-Francorchamps FIA Formula 2 round was to have been a pair of motor races that were due to be held on 31 August and 1 September 2019 at the Circuit de Spa-Francorchamps in Stavelot, Belgium as part of the FIA Formula 2 Championship. It was to be the ninth round of the 2019 FIA Formula 2 Championship and run in support of the 2019 Belgian Grand Prix.

The feature race was abandoned after an accident involving Anthoine Hubert, Juan Manuel Correa and Giuliano Alesi. Hubert and Correa were taken to the circuit's medical centre where the former died of his injuries. Correa was stabilised and transferred to a nearby hospital. The sprint race was cancelled as a mark of respect.

== Report ==
=== Championship standings before the round ===
ART Grand Prix driver Nyck de Vries entered the round with a thirty-point lead over Nicholas Latifi in the drivers' championship. Sérgio Sette Câmara was third, a further twenty-five points behind. In the teams' championship, DAMS started the round with a sixty-five point lead over UNI-Virtuosi Racing, and ART Grand Prix a further thirty-six points behind in third.

=== Driver changes ===
Twenty drivers representing ten teams were entered into the event. Nineteen of the drivers who contested the previous round in Hungary returned for the Spa-Francorchamps round. The only exception was Campos Racing driver Arjun Maini, who left the team. Campos signed Euroformula Open championship leader Marino Sato to replace Maini prior to the round.

=== Qualifying ===
Nyck de Vries qualified on pole position, his third of the season. Sérgio Sette Câmara was second, a quarter of a second behind de Vries, but de Vries' championship rival Nicholas Latifi was only able to qualify in eleventh when a red flag interrupted his final flying lap. Latifi was later promoted to tenth on the grid by way of a three-place penalty awarded to Jordan King for ignoring yellow flags.

=== Feature race accident ===
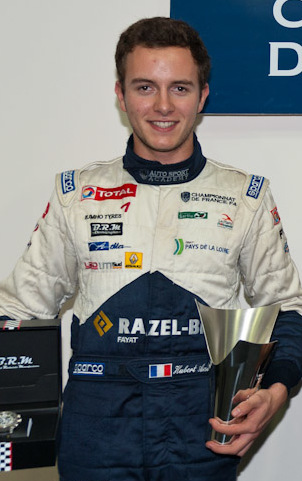
Anthoine Hubert died of injuries he sustained in an accident during the feature race.

A sequence of collisions involving multiple cars at the Raidillon corner stopped the feature race in its second lap. Trident driver Giuliano Alesi was running tenth when he spun into the barriers while going through Eau Rouge, damaging the rear of the car and bouncing back onto the circuit at the exit of the corner. Ralph Boschung, Anthoine Hubert and Jordan King had been running eleventh, twelfth and thirteenth at the time and took evasive action. Boschung cleared Alesi's Trident by taking to the tarmac run-off on the outside of the corner and King was able to slow in time to avoid contact. Hubert attempted to go to the right of Boschung, but made contact with the Trident's right-rear wheel, puncturing Boschung's tyre and causing Hubert to lose his front wing. Hubert's car continued along the run-off and crashed into a tyre barrier with the front and right side of the car. The car snapped around and was sitting at an angle that was perpendicular to the racing line, but it remained on the tarmac run-off area.

Juan Manuel Correa, who had been fourteenth at the time, was on the approach to Eau Rouge as Alesi lost control. He hit a piece of debris which lodged under a front wheel, preventing his car from steering effectively and causing it to go straight into the tarmac run-off. Correa hit Hubert at right angles, his Charouz hitting Hubert's BWT Arden in the left side of the car. Correa was estimated to be travelling at 257 km/h (159.7 mph) at the time of the impact. The force of the collision was enough to tear Hubert's car in half, his headrest being ejected in the process, and partly exposed Hubert's body. The front assembly of Correa's car broke away, exposing his feet; Correa's car also rolled over. Hubert's Arden pivoted around and hit the tyre barrier again, and came to a rest with its front wing and rear assembly up against the barriers while Correa's Charouz continued travelling several metres further along the circuit and came to rest upside-down on the grassy verge on the opposite side of the circuit. Campos driver Marino Sato braked to a complete stop to avoid cars on track, but in so doing stalled his engine and could not continue. Alesi was similarly unharmed—the accident unfolded behind him as he continued onto the Kemmel Straight—but his contact with the wall meant that his car suffered from race-ending damage and he pulled over on the approach to Les Combes. An FIA investigation into the accident found that fifteen seconds had elapsed between Alesi's initial loss of control and the cars of Hubert and Correa coming to a halt.

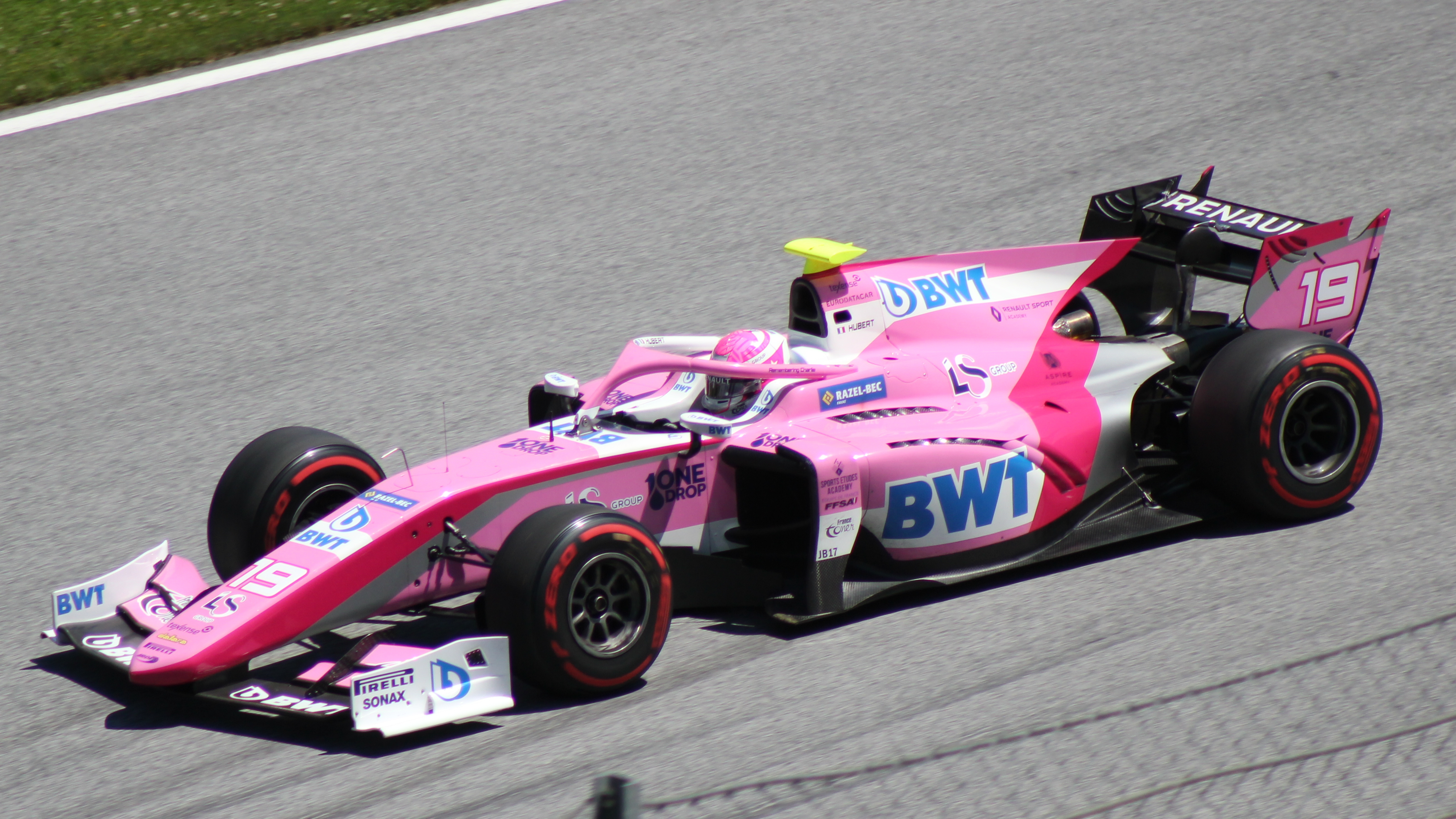
A Dallara F2 2018 entered by BWT Arden and driven by Hubert. Picture taken at the Red Bull Ring.

The seriousness of the accident and the amount of debris littered across the circuit meant that the race was immediately red-flagged. Hubert was attended to by medical staff within one minute of the accident unfolding. He and Correa were extracted from their cars and rushed to the circuit's medical centre. Hubert died of his injuries eighty-three minutes after the accident while Correa was stabilised and transferred to a hospital in Liège. He was admitted to intensive care and diagnosed with a spinal injury and fractured legs. He was reported to be conscious and lucid before undergoing surgery. His injuries ruled him out of competing for the remainder of the season. Correa was transferred to a specialist facility in the UK where he entered acute respiratory failure brought about by acute respiratory distress syndrome. His condition was downgraded to critical, but stable, but he was placed in a medically-induced coma on 7 September. Correa was brought out of the coma on 20 September, and underwent surgery to save his lower right leg. The reconstructive surgery was largely deemed a success. Correa's long-term prognosis called for up to a year of rehabilitation.

The feature race was not restarted and no result was issued, as per FIA regulations, as the leader had only completed one lap so the race was abandoned. The sprint race that had been planned for the following morning was cancelled after Hubert's death was announced.

==== Response ====
A manslaughter inquiry was opened by the Verviers prosecutor's office on 2 September; a number of auto racing and road safety experts have been employed as advisers. The car driven by Giuliano Alesi was impounded by the authorities as part of the investigation, forcing Trident Racing to enter a single car at the following round in Monza one week after the Spa-Francorchamps round. The Fédération Internationale de l'Automobile (FIA), the international governing body of motorsport, launched their own investigation into the accident. Hubert and Correa's cars were provided to the FIA to allow their forensic investigation to begin in earnest. The final report was published in February 2020 and concluded that there was no single contributing factor to the accident. It stated that previous contact with another car had caused Alesi to lose pressure in his rear tyre, setting off a chain reaction of events. The report also concluded that Hubert had taken every reasonable measure to avoid the initial contact and that his death was not the result of a driver error.

BWT Arden announced that they would only enter one car for Hubert's team-mate Tatiana Calderón at the Monza round. The team went on to prepare a car for Hubert, which was then left in the garage as a mark of respect. Artem Markelov was named as Hubert's replacement for the final two rounds of the championship in Sochi and Abu Dhabi. Hubert's racing number, #19, was retired and Markelov assigned #22. Matevos Isaakyan replaced the injured Correa at Charouz for the final races. Hubert's number was permanently retired in 2020.

Formula 1 driver Daniel Ricciardo admitted that he had given serious thought to withdrawing from the Belgian Grand Prix that took place the next day, and offered the opinion that other drivers had also considered it. Race winner Charles Leclerc, long time friend of Hubert, dedicated the victory to him. Organisers of the Formula 2 Championship introduced an award for the best rookie driver, which was named in Hubert's honour.

The managers of the Circuit de Spa-Francorchamps announced that a planned redesign of the Raidillon run-off area that had been scheduled for 2022 would be brought forward. The redesign had been scheduled to be introduced to allow the circuit to host a round of the FIM Endurance World Championship. The proposal called for the addition of a gravel trap to make the circuit suitable for motorcycle racing events sanctioned by the Fédération Internationale de Motocyclisme (FIM), the international governing body of motorcycle racing. The managers argued that the gravel trap would benefit racing cars by arresting their speed when they left the circuit.

== Classification ==
=== Qualifying ===
Pos.	No.	Driver	Team	Time	Gap	Grid
1	4	(Netherlands) Nyck de Vries	ART Grand Prix	1:58.304	–	1
2	5	(Brazil) Sérgio Sette Câmara	DAMS	1:58.576	+0.272	2
3	15	(United Kingdom) Jack Aitken	Campos Racing	1:58.785	+0.481	3
4	2	(Japan) Nobuharu Matsushita	Carlin	1:58.832	+0.528	4
5	1	(Switzerland) Louis Delétraz	Carlin	1:58.910	+0.606	5
6	9	(Germany) Mick Schumacher	Prema Racing	1:59.141	+0.837	6
7	3	(Russia) Nikita Mazepin	ART Grand Prix	1:59.142	+0.838	7
8	16	(United Kingdom) Jordan King	MP Motorsport	1:59.366	+1.062	11^{1}
9	7	(China) Guanyu Zhou	UNI-Virtuosi	1:59.425	+1.121	8
10	8	(Italy) Luca Ghiotto	UNI-Virtuosi	1:59.641	+1.310	9
11	6	(Canada) Nicholas Latifi	DAMS	1:59.717	+1.443	10
12	20	(France) Giuliano Alesi	Trident	1:59.961	+1.657	12
13	19	(France) Anthoine Hubert	BWT Arden	2.00.005	+1.701	13
14	21	(Switzerland) Ralph Boschung	Trident	2:00.030	+1.716	14
15	12	(United States) Juan Manuel Correa	Sauber Junior Team by Charouz	2:00.250	+1.936	15
16	10	(Indonesia) Sean Gelael	Prema Racing	2:00.327	+2.023	16
17	14	(Japan) Marino Sato	Campos Racing	2:01.185	+2.881	17
18	17	(India) Mahaveer Raghunathan	MP Motorsport	2:01.226	+2.922	19^{1}
19	18	(Colombia) Tatiana Calderón	BWT Arden	2:03.224	+4.920	18
107% time: 2:06.585
–	11	(United Kingdom) Callum Ilott	Sauber Junior Team by Charouz	no time	–	20^{2}

Notes:

- ^1 – Jordan King and Mahaveer Raghunathan were both given a three-place grid penalty for failing to slow under yellow flags. Both drivers also had two penalty points added to their racing licences.
- ^2 – Callum Ilott failed to set a lap time, but was given permission by the stewards to start the race.

== Championship standings after the round ==
Drivers' Championship standings

Pos.	Driver	Points
1	(Netherlands) Nyck de Vries	200
2	(Canada) Nicholas Latifi	166
3	(Brazil) Sérgio Sette Câmara	141
4	(Italy) Luca Ghiotto	135
5	(United Kingdom) Jack Aitken	134

Teams' Championship standings

Pos.	Team	Points
1	(France) DAMS	307
2	(United Kingdom) UNI-Virtuosi	242
3	(France) ART Grand Prix	202
4	(Spain) Campos Racing	164
5	(United Kingdom) Carlin	145

== See also ==
- 2019 Belgian Grand Prix
- 2019 Spa-Francorchamps Formula 3 round

Previous round: 2019 Budapest Formula 2 round	FIA Formula 2 Championship; 2019 season	Next round: 2019 Monza Formula 2 round
Previous round: 2018 Spa-Francorchamps Formula 2 round	Spa-Francorchamps Formula 2 round	Next round: 2020 Spa-Francorchamps Formula 2 round
