= 2017 Monte Carlo Formula 2 round =

Motor racing competition

2017 Monaco Formula 2 round
Round details
- Round 3 of 11 in the 2017 FIA Formula 2 Championship.
- Layout of the Circuit de Monaco
- Location: Circuit de Monaco, Monte-Carlo, Monaco
- Course: Temporary racing facility 3.337 km (2.074 mi)

Feature race
- Date: 26 May 2017
- Laps: 41
Pole position
Driver	(Monaco) Charles Leclerc	Prema Racing
Time	1:19.309	
Podium
First	(United Kingdom) Oliver Rowland	DAMS
Second	(Russia) Artem Markelov	Russian Time
Third	(Japan) Nobuharu Matsushita	ART Grand Prix
Fastest lap
Driver	(United Kingdom) Oliver Rowland	DAMS
- Time: 1:21.562 (on lap 27)

Sprint race
- Date: 27 May 2017
- Laps: 30
Podium
First	(Netherlands) Nyck de Vries	Rapax
Second	(Venezuela) Johnny Cecotto Jr.	Rapax
Third	(Sweden) Gustav Malja	Racing Engineering
Fastest lap
Driver	(Russia) Artem Markelov	Russian Time
- Time: 1:21.674 (on lap 8)

The 2017 Monaco FIA Formula 2 round was a pair of motor races held on 26 and 27 May 2017 at the Circuit de Monaco in Monte-Carlo, Monaco as part of the FIA Formula 2 Championship. It was the third round of the 2017 FIA Formula 2 Championship and was run in support of the 2017 Monaco Grand Prix.

== Report ==
=== Practice and qualifying ===
For qualifying, the field was split into two groups due to the short nature of the circuit.

=== Feature Race ===
After an aborted start due to Antonio Fuoco and Sean Gelael stalling on the grid, Charles Leclerc led into the first corner, followed by Alexander Albon and Oliver Rowland. A concertina effect occurred at the Grand Hotel Hairpin as Canamasas was spun, causing Gelael to lose his front wing and bringing out a local yellow. Whilst Leclerc was setting fastest laps up the front, Nicholas Latifi went out with engine failure in the tunnel, bringing out the safety car. Leclerc maintained the lead on the restart and began to set the track alight, setting fastest lap after fastest lap, eventually building a big gap back between himself and Rowland. Contact between Robert Visoiu and Louis Deletraz caused another safety car. Leclerc took his compulsory pitstop immediately and came out in fourth place after initial confusion with the safety car saw him lose the gap and then some to Rowland. Worse would come for Leclerc after an insecure tyre would force him into the pits on the restart. However, it would not come right for Leclerc and subsequently, was forced to retire from the race. Rowland would maintain the lead until the end, winning the race and racking up valuable points while doing it. Artem Markelov and Nobuharu Matsushita rounded out the podium.

== Classifications ==
=== Qualifying ===
==== Group A ====
Pos.	No.	Driver	Team	Time	Gap	Grid
1	1	(Monaco) Charles Leclerc	Prema Racing	1:19.309	—	1
2	9	(United Kingdom) Oliver Rowland	DAMS	1:19.541	+0.232	3
3	7	(Japan) Nobuharu Matsushita	ART Grand Prix	1:19.922	+0.613	5
4	15	(United Kingdom) Jordan King	MP Motorsport	1:20.058	+0.749	7
5	5	(Italy) Luca Ghiotto	Russian Time	1:20.089	+0.780	9
6	21	(Indonesia) Sean Gelael	Arden International	1:20.272	+0.963	11
7	19	(Venezuela) Johnny Cecotto Jr.	Rapax	1:20.413	+1.104	13
8	17	(Spain) Sergio Canamasas	Trident	1:20.415	+1.106	15
9	3	(Switzerland) Louis Delétraz	Racing Engineering	1:21.592	+2.283	17
10	11	(Switzerland) Ralph Boschung	Campos Racing	1:21.664	+2.355	19

==== Group B ====
Pos.	No.	Driver	Team	Time	Gap	Grid
1	8	(Thailand) Alexander Albon	ART Grand Prix	1:19.321	—	2
2	6	(Russia) Artem Markelov	Russian Time	1:19.647	+0.326	4
3	20	(France) Norman Nato	Arden International	1:19.803	+0.482	6
4	18	(Netherlands) Nyck de Vries	Rapax	1:19.814	+0.493	8
5	10	(Canada) Nicholas Latifi	DAMS	1:20.042	+0.721	10
6	4	(Sweden) Gustav Malja	Racing Engineering	1:20.282	+0.961	12
7	2	(Italy) Antonio Fuoco	Prema Racing	1:20.593	+1.272	14
8	12	(Romania) Robert Vișoiu	Campos Racing	1:20.867	+1.546	16
9	16	(Malaysia) Nabil Jeffri	Trident	1:21.239	+1.918	18
10	14	(Brazil) Sérgio Sette Câmara	MP Motorsport	1:21.271	+1.950	20

=== Feature Race ===
Pos.	No.	Driver	Team	Laps	Time / Gap	Grid	Points
1	9	(United Kingdom) Oliver Rowland	DAMS	41	1:00:46.545	3	25 (2)
2	6	(Russia) Artem Markelov	Russian Time	41	+0.864	4	18
3	7	(Japan) Nobuharu Matsushita	ART Grand Prix	41	+13.769	5	15
4	8	(Thailand) Alexander Albon	ART Grand Prix	41	+19.738	2	12
5	5	(Italy) Luca Ghiotto	Russian Time	41	+24.657	9	10
6	4	(Sweden) Gustav Malja	Racing Engineering	41	+28.082	12	8
7	18	(Netherlands) Nyck de Vries	Rapax	41	+28.453	8	6
8	19	(Venezuela) Johnny Cecotto Jr.	Rapax	41	+29.125	13	4
9	15	(United Kingdom) Jordan King	MP Motorsport	41	+45.552	7	2
10	17	(Spain) Sergio Canamasas	Trident	41	+46.581	15	1
11	2	(Italy) Antonio Fuoco	Prema Racing	41	+47.818	14	
12	11	(Switzerland) Ralph Boschung	Campos Racing	41	+50.772	19	
13	21	(Indonesia) Sean Gelael	Arden International	41	+53.694	11	
14	16	(Malaysia) Nabil Jeffri	Trident	40	+1 lap	18	
15	3	(Switzerland) Louis Delétraz	Racing Engineering	39	+2 laps	17	
DNF	14	(Brazil) Sérgio Sette Câmara	MP Motorsport	33	Oil leak	20	
DNF	1	(Monaco) Charles Leclerc	Prema Racing	26	Suspension	1	(4)
DNF	20	(France) Norman Nato	Arden International	23	Hydraulics	6	
DNF	12	(Romania) Robert Vișoiu	Campos Racing	20	Accident	16	
DNF	10	(Canada) Nicholas Latifi	DAMS	6	Engine	10	
Fastest lap: (United Kingdom) Oliver Rowland (DAMS) – 1:21.562 (on lap 27)

=== Sprint Race ===
Pos.	No.	Driver	Team	Laps	Time / Gap	Grid	Points
1	18	(Netherlands) Nyck de Vries	Rapax	30	41:51.284	2	15
2	19	(Venezuela) Johnny Cecotto Jr.	Rapax	30	+9.834	1	12
3	4	(Sweden) Gustav Malja	Racing Engineering	30	+10.415	3	10
4	5	(Italy) Luca Ghiotto	Russian Time	30	+10.881	4	8
5	6	(Russia) Artem Markelov	Russian Time	30	+11.258	7	6 (2)
6	8	(Thailand) Alexander Albon	ART Grand Prix	30	+11.901	5	4
7	7	(Japan) Nobuharu Matsushita	ART Grand Prix	30	+13.627	6	2
8	15	(United Kingdom) Jordan King	MP Motorsport	30	+13.970	9	1
9	9	(United Kingdom) Oliver Rowland	DAMS	30	+28.993	8	
10	2	(Italy) Antonio Fuoco	Prema Racing	30	+29.051	11	
11	16	(Malaysia) Nabil Jeffri	Trident	30	+34.041	14	
12	21	(Indonesia) Sean Gelael	Arden International	30	+42.732	13	
13	10	(Canada) Nicholas Latifi	DAMS	30	+43.430	20	
14	14	(Brazil) Sérgio Sette Câmara	MP Motorsport	30	+46.423	16	
15	12	(Romania) Robert Vișoiu	Campos Racing	30	+47.007	19	
16	3	(Switzerland) Louis Delétraz	Racing Engineering	30	+53.179	15	
17	17	(Spain) Sergio Canamasas	Trident	30	+55.677	10	
DNF	1	(Monaco) Charles Leclerc	Prema Racing	20	Electrical	17	
DNF	11	(Switzerland) Ralph Boschung	Campos Racing	14	Brakes	12	
DNF	20	(France) Norman Nato	Arden International	2	Suspension	18	
Fastest lap: (Russia) Artem Markelov (Russian Time) – 1:21.674 (on lap 8)

== Championship standings after the round ==
Drivers' Championship standings

	Pos.	Driver	Points
	1	(Monaco) Charles Leclerc	77
	2	(United Kingdom) Oliver Rowland	74
1	3	(Russia) Artem Markelov	60
1	4	(Italy) Luca Ghiotto	56
	5	(Japan) Nobuharu Matsushita	48

Teams' Championship standings

	Pos.	Team	Points
2	1	(Russia) Russian Time	116
	2	(France) DAMS	102
1	3	(France) ART Grand Prix	85
3	4	(Italy) Prema Racing	79
3	5	(Italy) Rapax	43

- Note: Only the top five positions are included for both sets of standings.

Previous round: 2017 Catalunya FIA Formula 2 round	FIA Formula 2 Championship; 2017 season	Next round: 2017 Baku FIA Formula 2 round
Previous round: 2016 Monaco GP2 Series round	FIA Formula 2 round	Next round: 2018 Monaco FIA Formula 2 round
