= 2019 Sochi Formula 2 round =

International motor racing meeting

(Russia) 2019 Sochi Formula 2 round
Round details
- Round 11 of 12 in the 2019 FIA Formula 2 Championship.
- Layout of the Sochi Autodrom
- Location: Sochi Autodrom, Sochi, Krasnodar Krai, Russia
- Course: Permanent racing facility 5.848 km (3.630 mi)

Feature race
- Date: 28 September 2019
- Laps: 28
Pole position
Driver	(Netherlands) Nyck de Vries	ART Grand Prix
Time	1:47.440	
Podium
First	(Netherlands) Nyck de Vries	ART Grand Prix
Second	(Canada) Nicholas Latifi	DAMS
Third	(Switzerland) Louis Delétraz	Carlin
Fastest lap
Driver	(Italy) Luca Ghiotto	UNI-Virtuosi Racing
- Time: 1:51.104 (on lap 26)

Sprint race
- Date: 29 September 2019
- Laps: 21
Podium
First	(Italy) Luca Ghiotto	UNI-Virtuosi Racing
Second	(Netherlands) Nyck de Vries	ART Grand Prix
Third	(United Kingdom) Callum Ilott	Sauber Junior Team by Charouz
Fastest lap
Driver	(Canada) Nicholas Latifi	DAMS
- Time: 1:52.272 (on lap 12)

The 2019 Sochi FIA Formula 2 round consisted of a pair of Formula Two motor races that took place on 28 and 29 September 2019 at the Sochi Autodrom in Sochi, Russia. It was the eleventh and penultimate round of the 2019 FIA Formula 2 Championship.

Nyck de Vries of ART Grand Prix set the fastest time in qualifying for the feature race. He won the feature race, and won the driver's championship with three races remaining in the season. In the sprint race that followed, Italian Luca Ghiotto took the victory for Virtuosi Racing ahead of de Vries.

== Background ==
The event was held at the Sochi Autodrom in Sochi across the weekend of 28–29 September 2019. The Grand Prix was the eleventh and penultimate round of the 2019 FIA Formula 2 Championship.

== Entrants ==
In the aborted race in the round at Spa-Francorchamps, a multiple-car pileup resulted in the death of Anthoine Hubert of Arden and seriously injured Juan Manuel Correa of Charouz Racing. The incident also involved Giuliano Alesi of Trident Racing. While all three teams involved in the accident ran only one car rather than the usual two in the previous race at Monza, the teams resorted back to the two-drive line-up for the race. While Ralph Boschung returned for Trident, Russian Artem Markelov returned to Formula 2 to replace Hubert at Arden and another Russian Matevos Isaakyan made his debut for Charouz in place of the injured Correa.

== Format ==
The race weekend consisted of two races–feature race and sprint. The grid order for the feature race was determined based on the times set during qualification. The pole-sitter of the feature race received four championship points. Points were awarded to the top 10 classified finishers in the feature race. The feature race ran for 163.744 km (101.746 mi) and consisted of 28 laps around the circuit.

The grid for the sprint race were based on the results of the feature race with the top eight drivers having their positions reversed. The sprint race was a shorter version with 21 laps. Points are awarded to the top 8 classified finishers in the Sprint race. Two points were given to the driver who sets the fastest lap inside the top ten in both the feature and sprint races.

== Qualifying ==
The qualifying session started under a dark cloud cover with a 60% chance of rain. Luca Ghiotto, who was amongst the first drivers to venture out, warned of rain falling on parts of the circuit. Nicolas Latifi set the initial fastest time of 1:48.060, ahead of the championship leader Nyck de Vries, with Ghiotto in third. With eight minutes to go in the session, more rainfall came in, and the drivers scrambled to set a faster lap time before the track got wet. de Vries snatched the pole position in a last gasp flying lap, ahead of Latifi in second, and Callum Ilott in third.

=== Classification ===
Pos.	No.	Driver	Team	Time	Gap	Grid
1	4	(Netherlands) Nyck de Vries	ART Grand Prix	1:47.440	–	1
2	6	(Canada) Nicholas Latifi	DAMS	1:47.700	+0.260	2
3	11	(United Kingdom) Callum Ilott	Sauber Junior Team by Charouz	1:47.737	+0.297	3
4	8	(Italy) Luca Ghiotto	UNI-Virtuosi Racing	1:47.767	0.327	4
5	7	(China) Guanyu Zhou	UNI-Virtuosi Racing	1:47.843	+0.403	5
6	5	(Brazil) Sérgio Sette Câmara	DAMS	1:48.031	+0.591	6
7	1	(Switzerland) Louis Delétraz	Carlin	1:48.188	+0.748	7
8	3	(Russia) Nikita Mazepin	ART Grand Prix	1:48.226	+0.786	8
9	16	(United Kingdom) Jordan King	MP Motorsport	1:48.320	+0.880	9
10	2	(Japan) Nobuharu Matsushita	Carlin	1:48.396	+0.956	10
11	9	(Germany) Mick Schumacher	Prema Racing	1:48.444	+1.004	11
12	15	(United Kingdom) Jack Aitken	Campos Racing	1:48.477	+1.037	12
13	10	(Indonesia) Sean Gelael	Prema Racing	1:48.567	+1.127	13
14	20	(France) Giuliano Alesi	Trident	1:48.850	+1.410	14
15	21	(Switzerland) Ralph Boschung	Trident	1:48.880	+1.440	15
16	22	(Russia) Artem Markelov	BWT Arden	1:49.244	+1.804	16
17	12	(Russia) Matevos Isaakyan	Sauber Junior Team by Charouz	1:49.497	+2.057	17
18	18	(Colombia) Tatiana Calderón	BWT Arden	1:50.255	+2.815	18
19	14	(Japan) Marino Sato	Campos Racing	1:50.311	+2.871	19
20	17	(India) Mahaveer Raghunathan	MP Motorsport	1:51.949	+4.509	20

== Feature race ==
On a dry track, de Vries led the drivers from the line, with the top ten largely unaltered. Mick Schumacher rose to seventh after he gained multiple places during the start. While Ilott moved down the order, Ghiotto moved up the order to third, before he overtook Latifi and de Vries to take the lead. Apart from De Vries and Latifi, the other top six runners were on harder tyres, and an alternate tyre strategy. When both the drivers pitted early, they moved down the order. However, when Ghiotto ultimately pitted late in the race, he came behind both De Vries and Latifi, and Louis Delétraz. The top three maintained their positions, with de Vries winning the race, and the world championship. Latifi finished second, and Delétraz won his maiden podium.

=== Classification ===
Pos.	No.	Driver	Team	Laps	Time/Retired	Grid	Points
1	4	(Netherlands) Nyck de Vries	ART Grand Prix	28	54:12.087	1	25 (4)
2	6	(Canada) Nicholas Latifi	DAMS	28	+4.918	2	18
3	1	(Switzerland) Louis Delétraz	Carlin	28	+5.995	7	15
4	8	(Italy) Luca Ghiotto	UNI-Virtuosi Racing	28	+7.607	4	12 (2)
5	5	(Brazil) Sérgio Sette Câmara	DAMS	28	+11.378	6	10
6	2	(Japan) Nobuharu Matsushita	Carlin	28	+20.364	10	8
7	15	(United Kingdom) Jack Aitken	Campos Racing	28	+27.403	12	6
8	3	(Russia) Nikita Mazepin	ART Grand Prix	28	+28.572	8	4
9	11	(United Kingdom) Callum Ilott	Sauber Junior Team by Charouz	28	+32.394	3	2
10	7	(China) Guanyu Zhou	UNI-Virtuosi Racing	28	+33.756	5	1
11	10	(Indonesia) Sean Gelael	Prema Racing	28	+43.365	13	
12	16	(United Kingdom) Jordan King	MP Motorsport	28	+47.493	9	
13	20	(France) Giuliano Alesi	Trident	28	+48.620	14	
14	21	(Switzerland) Ralph Boschung	Trident	28	+59.021	15	
15	18	(Colombia) Tatiana Calderón	BWT Arden	28	+1:09.884	18	
16	14	(Japan) Marino Sato	Campos Racing	28	+1:46.218	19	
17	17	(India) Mahaveer Raghunathan	MP Motorsport	27	+1 lap	20	
18	12	(Russia) Matevos Isaakyan	Sauber Junior Team by Charouz	27	+1 lap	17	
DNF	9	(Germany) Mick Schumacher	Prema Racing	19	Oil Leak	11	
DNF	22	(Russia) Artem Markelov	BWT Arden	0	Accident	16	
Fastest lap: Luca Ghiotto (UNI-Virtuosi Racing) 1:51.104 (on lap 26)

== Sprint Race ==
Nikita Mazepin started on the pole position for the sprint race based on reverse grid order. He led the drivers from the start, before a skirmish with Jack Aitken resulted in both the drivers going off the track. When the drivers attempted to return to the racing line, Aitken pushed Mazepin into the path of Nobuharu Matsushita, and the resulting collision brought about a red flag. The race was subsequently shortened to 15 laps due to time constraints. When the race resumed, Ghiotto took the lead, ahead of Ilott and De Vries. While the Italian held on for a race win, de Vries overtook Ilott for second with Latifi and Guanyu Zhou completing the top five.

=== Classification ===
Pos.	No.	Driver	Team	Laps	Time/Retired	Grid	Points
1	8	(Italy) Luca Ghiotto	UNI-Virtuosi Racing	15	1:18:21.329	5	15
2	4	(Netherlands) Nyck de Vries	ART Grand Prix	15	+0.712	8	12
3	11	(United Kingdom) Callum Ilott	Sauber Junior Team by Charouz	15	+1.672	9	10
4	6	(Canada) Nicholas Latifi	DAMS	15	+3.383	7	8 (2)
5	7	(China) Guanyu Zhou	UNI-Virtuosi Racing	15	+3.820	10	6
6	5	(Brazil) Sérgio Sette Câmara	DAMS	15	+7.336	4	4
7	10	(Indonesia) Sean Gelael	Prema Racing	15	+10.343	11	2
8	20	(France) Giuliano Alesi	Trident	15	+13.108	13	1
9	16	(United Kingdom) Jordan King	MP Motorsport	15	+14.851	12	
10	22	(Russia) Artem Markelov	BWT Arden	15	+16.769	20	
11	15	(United Kingdom) Jack Aitken	Campos Racing	15	+23.898	2	
12	21	(Switzerland) Ralph Boschung	Trident	15	+26.558	14	
13	12	(Russia) Matevos Isaakyan	Sauber Junior Team by Charouz	15	+27.414	18	
14	1	(Switzerland) Louis Delétraz	Carlin	15	+31.933	6	
15	14	(Japan) Marino Sato	Campos Racing	15	+36.472	16	
16	18	(Colombia) Tatiana Calderón	BWT Arden	15	+43.057	15	
17	17	(India) Mahaveer Raghunathan	MP Motorsport	15	+1:01.506	17	
DNF	9	(Germany) Mick Schumacher	Prema Racing	7	Collision damage	19	
DNF	3	(Russia) Nikita Mazepin	ART Grand Prix	0	Collision	1	
DNF	2	(Japan) Nobuharu Matsushita	Carlin	0	Collision	3	
Fastest lap: Nicholas Latifi (DAMS) 1:52.272 (on lap 12)

== Championship standings after the round ==
De Vries ends the weekend with 266 points and won the driver's Championship ahead of Latifi on 194 points. The fight for the Teams’ Championship would go on to the final round as DAMS only had a 53 point lead over Virtuosi Racing.

Drivers' Championship standings

Pos.	Driver	Points
1	(Netherlands) Nyck de Vries	266
2	(Canada) Nicholas Latifi	194
3	(Italy) Luca Ghiotto	184
4	(Brazil) Sérgio Sette Câmara	161
5	(United Kingdom) Jack Aitken	159

Teams' Championship standings

Pos.	Team	Points
1	(France) DAMS	359
2	(United Kingdom) UNI-Virtuosi	306
3	(France) ART Grand Prix	276
4	(United Kingdom) Carlin	200
5	(Spain) Campos Racing	189

== See also ==
- 2019 Russian Grand Prix
- 2019 Sochi Formula 3 round

Previous round: 2019 Monza Formula 2 round	FIA Formula 2 Championship; 2019 season	Next round: 2019 Yas Island Formula 2 round
Previous round: 2018 Sochi Formula 2 round	Sochi Formula 2 round	Next round: 2020 Sochi Formula 2 round
