= 2019 Monza Formula 2 round =

Motor racing competition

(Italy) 2019 Monza Formula 2 round
Round details
- Round 10 of 12 in the 2019 FIA Formula 2 Championship.
- Layout of the Autodromo Nazionale Monza
- Location: Autodromo Nazionale Monza, Monza, Italy
- Course: Permanent racing facility 5.793 km (3.600 mi)

Feature race
- Date: 7 September 2019
- Laps: 30
Pole position
Driver	(United Kingdom) Callum Ilott	Sauber Junior Team by Charouz
Time	1:33.887	
Podium
First	(Japan) Nobuharu Matsushita	Carlin
Second	(Italy) Luca Ghiotto	UNI-Virtuosi Racing
Third	(Netherlands) Nyck de Vries	ART Grand Prix
Fastest lap
Driver	(Germany) Mick Schumacher (Note: Mick Schumacher set the fastest lap, but did not finish in the top 10, so was ineligible to be the point-scorer for the fastest lap. Luca Ghiotto was the point-scorer instead for setting the fastest lap of those finishing in the top 10.)	Prema Racing
- Time: 1:34.632 (on lap 21)

Sprint race
- Date: 8 September 2019
- Laps: 21
Podium
First	(United Kingdom) Jack Aitken	Campos Racing
Second	(United Kingdom) Jordan King	MP Motorsport
Third	(Netherlands) Nyck de Vries	ART Grand Prix
Fastest lap
Driver	(Germany) Mick Schumacher	Prema Racing
- Time: 1:35.422 (on 4)

The 2019 Monza FIA Formula 2 round consisted of a pair of Formula Two motor races that took place on 7 and 8 September 2019 at the Autodromo Nazionale di Monza in Monza, Italy. It was the tenth round of the 2019 FIA Formula 2 Championship.

Callum Ilott set the fastest time in qualifying for the feature race. Japanese driver Nobuharu Matsushita of Carlin Motorsport won the feature race. In the sprint race that followed, British driver Jack Aitken took the victory for Campos Racing.

== Background ==
The event was held at the Autodromo Nazionale di Monza in Monza across the weekend of 7–8 September 2019. The Grand Prix was the tenth round of the 2019 FIA Formula 2 Championship.

== Entrants ==
In the aborted race in the previous round at Spa-Francorchamps, a multiple-car pileup resulted in the death of Anthoine Hubert of Arden and seriously injured Juan Manuel Correa of Charouz Racing. The incident also involved Giuliano Alesi of Trident Racing. All three teams involved in the accident ran only one car rather than the usual two as the cars involved in the accident were impounded by authorities as part of the crash investigation. While Tatiana Calderón (Arden) and Callum Ilott (Charouz) ran the only cars for their team, Trident benched Ralph Boschung in favour of Alesi, who was not injured in the crash.

== Format ==
The race weekend consisted of two races–feature race and sprint. The grid order for the feature race was determined based on the times set during qualification. The pole-sitter of the feature race received four championship points. Points were awarded to the top 10 classified finishers in the feature race. The feature race ran for 173.79 km (107.99 mi) and consisted of 30 laps around the circuit.

The grid for the sprint race were based on the results of the feature race with the top eight drivers having their positions reversed. The sprint race was a shorter version with 21 laps. Points are awarded to the top 8 classified finishers in the Sprint race. Two points were given to the driver who sets the fastest lap inside the top ten in both the feature and sprint races.

== Qualifying ==
In the qualifying session, the cars took to the track on a wet circuit which resulted in wobbling of the cars. Luca Ghiotto, who topped the practice charts, set the initial fastest lap with a time of 1:37.906. Guanyu Zhou briefly secured pole position before Callum Ilott topped the time charts with a 1:33.887 lap. Shortly after, Nobuharu Matsushita and Tatiana Calderon crashed their cars, and brought the red flag. When the session resumed, the track was wetter, and no driver was able to set a better lap time.

=== Classification ===
Pos.	No.	Driver	Team	Time	Gap	Grid
1	11	(United Kingdom) Callum Ilott	Sauber Junior Team by Charouz	1:33.887	–	1
2	7	(China) Guanyu Zhou	UNI-Virtuosi Racing	1:34.030	+0.143	2
3	3	(Russia) Nikita Mazepin	ART Grand Prix	1:34.063	+0.176	3
4	5	(Brazil) Sérgio Sette Câmara	DAMS	1:34.272	+0.385	4
5	2	(Japan) Nobuharu Matsushita	Carlin	1:34.419	+0.532	5
6	6	(Canada) Nicholas Latifi	DAMS	1:34.885	+0.998	6
7	16	(United Kingdom) Jordan King	MP Motorsport	1:34.944	+1.057	7
8	9	(Germany) Mick Schumacher	Prema Racing	1:35.082	+1.195	8
9	1	(Switzerland) Louis Delétraz	Carlin	1:35.101	+1.214	9
10	10	(Indonesia) Sean Gelael	Prema Racing	1:35.148	+1.261	10
11	20	(France) Giuliano Alesi	Trident	1:35.310	+1.423	11
12	15	(United Kingdom) Jack Aitken	Campos Racing	1:35.547	+1.660	12
13	8	(Italy) Luca Ghiotto	UNI-Virtuosi Racing	1:35.641	+1.754	13
14	14	(Japan) Marino Sato	Campos Racing	1:36.709	+2.822	14
15	17	(India) Mahaveer Raghunathan	MP Motorsport	1:37.027	+3.140	15
107% time: 1:40.459
NC	18	(Colombia) Tatiana Calderón	BWT Arden	1:46.667	+12.780	16
EX	4	(Netherlands) Nyck de Vries	ART Grand Prix	1:34.156	+0.269	17^{1}

Notes

- ^1 – Nyck de Vries was excluded from the qualifying results due to fuel infringement.

== Feature race ==
Ilott, who started on pole for the first time in his career fought off a challenge from Zhou in the first corner to maintain their places. While Nikita Mazepin from third fell down the order following a mistake, Zhou committed a similar error in the second lap of the race. Nobuharu Matsushita rose through the field to second place by lap five, and overtook Ilott for the lead. Ghiotto, who was on an alternate tyre strategy, moved to second place after Nicholas Latifi and Zhou were involved in a crash. Championship leader Nyck de Vries, who started last, completed the podium positions by finishing third.

=== Classification ===
Pos.	No.	Driver	Team	Laps	Time/Retired	Grid	Points
1	2	(Japan) Nobuharu Matsushita	Carlin	30	48:56.512	5	25
2	8	(Italy) Luca Ghiotto	UNI-Virtuosi Racing	30	+5.752	13	18 (2)
3	4	(Netherlands) Nyck de Vries	ART Grand Prix	30	+9.207	17	15
4	11	(United Kingdom) Callum Ilott	Sauber Junior Team by Charouz	30	+17.213	1	12 (4)
5	5	(Brazil) Sérgio Sette Câmara	DAMS	30	+20.487	4	10
6	16	(United Kingdom) Jordan King	MP Motorsport	30	+24.810	7	8
7	20	(France) Giuliano Alesi	Trident	30	+32.335	11	6
8	15	(United Kingdom) Jack Aitken	Campos Racing	30	+33.059	12	4
9	10	(Indonesia) Sean Gelael	Prema Racing	30	+38.890	10	2
10	17	(India) Mahaveer Raghunathan	MP Motorsport	30	+1:12.785	15	1
11	3	(Russia) Nikita Mazepin	ART Grand Prix	29	+1 lap	3	
12	14	(Japan) Marino Sato	Campos Racing	29	+1 lap	14	
13	6	(Canada) Nicholas Latifi	DAMS	29	+1 lap	6	
DNF	9	(Germany) Mick Schumacher	Prema Racing	22	Engine	8	
DNF	7	(China) Guanyu Zhou	UNI-Virtuosi Racing	13	Collision damage^{1}	2	
DNF	18	(Colombia) Tatiana Calderón	BWT Arden	5	Spin	16	
DNF	1	(Switzerland) Louis Delétraz	Carlin	1	Spin	9	
Fastest lap: Mick Schumacher (Prema Racing) 1:34.632 (on lap 21)

Notes

- ^1 – Guanyu Zhou was handed a three-place grid drop for the sprint race following a collision with Nicholas Latifi in the feature race.

== Sprint race ==
Jack Aitken started the sprint race on pole based on the reverse grid order. Aitken led the race from the start while Jordan King and Ilott overtook Giuliano Alesi, who started second. King overtook Aitken afterwards to go in to the lead before a struggle between Ghiotto and Sérgio Sette Câmara resulted in a Virtual Safety Car. When the race resumed, Aitken re-took the lead, and finished in first place. Behind him, King drove home in second place, and Matsushita finished third after Ilott damaged his car in the final lap of the race. However, a five second penalty for Matsushita pushed him to fifth and allowed De Vries into third.

=== Classification ===
Pos.	No.	Driver	Team	Laps	Time/Retired	Grid	Points
1	15	(United Kingdom) Jack Aitken	Campos Racing	21	34:26.288	1	15
2	16	(United Kingdom) Jordan King	MP Motorsport	21	+2.764	3	12
3	4	(Netherlands) Nyck de Vries	ART Grand Prix	21	+6.530	6	10
4	7	(China) Guanyu Zhou	UNI-Virtuosi Racing	21	+7.612	17	8
5	2	(Japan) Nobuharu Matsushita	Carlin	21	+8.189	8	6
6	9	(Germany) Mick Schumacher	Prema Racing	21	+8.541	14	4 (2)
7	20	(France) Giuliano Alesi	Trident	21	+12.851	2	2
8	1	(Switzerland) Louis Delétraz	Carlin	21	+13.389	16	1
9	3	(Russia) Nikita Mazepin	ART Grand Prix	21	+13.941	9	
10	6	(Canada) Nicholas Latifi	DAMS	21	+23.091	13	
11	14	(Japan) Marino Sato	Campos Racing	21	+29.564	12	
12	11	(United Kingdom) Callum Ilott	Sauber Junior Team by Charouz	21	+41.390	5	
13	17	(India) Mahaveer Raghunathan	MP Motorsport	21	+52.478	10	
14	18	(Colombia) Tatiana Calderón	BWT Arden	21	+53.021	15	
15	8	(Italy) Luca Ghiotto	UNI-Virtuosi Racing	21	+1:32.691	7	
DNF	10	(Indonesia) Sean Gelael	Prema Racing	9	Mechanical	9	
DNF	5	(Brazil) Sérgio Sette Câmara	DAMS	6	Collision damage	4	
Fastest lap: Mick Schumacher (Prema Racing) 1:35.422 (on lap 4)

== Championship standings after the round ==
Drivers' Championship standings

Pos.	Driver	Points
1	(Netherlands) Nyck de Vries	225
2	(Canada) Nicholas Latifi	166
3	(Italy) Luca Ghiotto	155
4	(United Kingdom) Jack Aitken	153
5	(Brazil) Sérgio Sette Câmara	151

Teams' Championship standings

Pos.	Team	Points
1	(France) DAMS	317
2	(United Kingdom) UNI-Virtuosi Racing	270
3	(France) ART Grand Prix	231
4	(Spain) Campos Racing	183
5	(United Kingdom) Carlin	177

== See also ==
- 2019 Italian Grand Prix
- 2019 Monza Formula 3 round

== Notes ==
Previous round: 2019 Spa-Francorchamps Formula 2 round	FIA Formula 2 Championship; 2019 season	Next round: 2019 Sochi Formula 2 round
Previous round: 2018 Monza Formula 2 round	Monza Formula 2 round	Next round: 2020 Monza Formula 2 round
