= 2020 Monza Formula 2 round =

Motor racing competition

(Italy) 2020 Monza Formula 2 round
Round details
- Round 8 of 12 in the 2020 FIA Formula 2 Championship.
- Layout of the Autodromo Nazionale Monza
- Location: Autodromo Nazionale Monza, Monza, Italy
- Course: Permanent racing facility 5.793 km (3.600 mi)

Feature race
- Date: 5 September 2020
- Laps: 30
Pole position
Driver	(United Kingdom) Callum Ilott	UNI-Virtuosi Racing
Time	1:31.929	
Podium
First	(Germany) Mick Schumacher	Prema Racing
Second	(Italy) Luca Ghiotto	Hitech Grand Prix
Third	(Denmark) Christian Lundgaard	ART Grand Prix
Fastest lap
Driver	(Italy) Luca Ghiotto	Hitech Grand Prix
- Time: 1:34.181 (on lap 25)

Sprint race
- Date: 6 September 2020
- Laps: 21
Podium
First	(United Kingdom) Callum Ilott	UNI-Virtuosi Racing
Second	(Denmark) Christian Lundgaard	ART Grand Prix
Third	(Germany) Mick Schumacher	Prema Racing
Fastest lap
Driver	(Japan) Yuki Tsunoda	Carlin
- Time: 1:34.194 (on 14)

The 2020 Monza FIA Formula 2 round was a pair of motor races for Formula 2 cars that took place on 5-6 September 2020 at the Autodromo Nazionale Monza in Monza, Italy as part of the FIA Formula 2 Championship. It was the eighth round of the 2020 FIA Formula 2 Championship and ran in support of the 2020 Italian Grand Prix.

== Report ==
Ilott repeated his previous year success in Monza qualifying, grabbing another pole. But pit stop struggles left him without the chance of taking the podium. The race was won by Schumacher, who was victorious in the feature race for the first time. He was accompanied by Ghiotto and Lundgaard on podium, with the former equalling the all-time record of 23 podiums by last year's champion Nyck de Vries.

In the sprint race Ticktum crossed the finish line first after dominating the race, but he was disqualified due to a lack of fuel. Ilott inherited the win and retook the lead in the championship from Shwartzman.

== Classification ==
=== Qualifying ===
Pos.	No.	Driver	Team	Time	Gap	Grid
1	4	(United Kingdom) Callum Ilott	UNI-Virtuosi	1:31.929		1
2	7	(Japan) Yuki Tsunoda	Carlin	1:31.959	+0.030	2
3	25	(Italy) Luca Ghiotto	Hitech Grand Prix	1:32.127	+0.198	3
4	6	(Denmark) Christian Lundgaard	ART Grand Prix	1:32.200	+0.271	4
5	22	(Israel) Roy Nissany	Trident	1:32.226	+0.297	5
6	24	(Russia) Nikita Mazepin	Hitech Grand Prix	1:32.267	+0.338	6
7	20	(Germany) Mick Schumacher	Prema Racing	1:32.277	+0.348	7
8	8	(India) Jehan Daruvala	Carlin	1:32.308	+0.379	8
9	11	(Switzerland) Louis Delétraz	Charouz Racing System	1:32.342	+0.413	9
10	2	(United Kingdom) Dan Ticktum	DAMS	1:32.373	+0.444	10
11	1	(Estonia) Jüri Vips	DAMS	1:32.381	+0.452	11
12	15	(Brazil) Felipe Drugovich	MP Motorsport	1:32.412	+0.483	12
13	14	(Japan) Nobuharu Matsushita	MP Motorsport	1:32.420	+0.491	13
14	23	(Japan) Marino Sato	Trident	1:32.534	+0.605	14
15	5	(New Zealand) Marcus Armstrong	ART Grand Prix	1:32.592	+0.663	15
16	21	(Russia) Robert Shwartzman	Prema Racing	1:32.597	+0.668	16
17	3	(China) Guanyu Zhou	UNI-Virtuosi	1:32.602	+0.673	17
18	12	(Brazil) Pedro Piquet	Charouz Racing System	1:32.610	+0.681	18
19	9	(United Kingdom) Jack Aitken	Campos Racing	1:32.623	+0.694	19
20	17	(France) Giuliano Alesi	BWT HWA Racelab	1:32.626	+0.697	20
21	16	(Russia) Artem Markelov	BWT HWA Racelab	1:33.311	+1.382	21
22	10	(Brazil) Guilherme Samaia	Campos Racing	1:33.501	+1.572	22

=== Feature race ===
Pos.	No.	Driver	Entrant	Laps	Time/Retired	Grid	Points
1	20	(Germany) Mick Schumacher	Prema Racing	30	48:24.641	7	25
2	25	(Italy) Luca Ghiotto	Hitech Grand Prix	30	+3.185	3	18 (2)
3	6	(Denmark) Christian Lundgaard	ART Grand Prix	30	+7.321	4	15
4	7	(Japan) Yuki Tsunoda	Carlin	30	+9.279	2	12
5	3	(China) Guanyu Zhou	UNI-Virtuosi	30	+12.553	17	10
6	4	(United Kingdom) Callum Ilott	UNI-Virtuosi	30	+15.145	1	8 (4)
7	2	(United Kingdom) Dan Ticktum	DAMS	30	+15.291	10	6
8	11	(Switzerland) Louis Delétraz	Charouz Racing System	30	+17.561	9	4
9	21	(Russia) Robert Shwartzman	Prema Racing	30	+18.238	16	2
10	8	(India) Jehan Daruvala	Carlin	30	+21.154	8	1
11	1	(Estonia) Jüri Vips	DAMS	30	+23.947	11	
12	12	(Brazil) Pedro Piquet	Charouz Racing System	30	+25.004	18	
13	9	(United Kingdom) Jack Aitken	Campos Racing	30	+27.859	19	
14	5	(New Zealand) Marcus Armstrong	ART Grand Prix	30	+28.379^{1}	15	
15	14	(Japan) Nobuharu Matsushita	MP Motorsport	30	+28.666	13	
16	15	(Brazil) Felipe Drugovich	MP Motorsport	30	+29.257	12	
17	16	(Russia) Artem Markelov	BWT HWA Racelab	30	+29.927	21	
18	17	(France) Giuliano Alesi	BWT HWA Racelab	30	+30.343	20	
19	22	(Israel) Roy Nissany	Trident Racing	30	+33.081	5	
20	23	(Japan) Marino Sato	Trident Racing	30	+51.408	14	
21	10	(Brazil) Guilherme Samaia	Campos Racing	30	+52.406	22	
DNF	24	(Russia) Nikita Mazepin	Hitech Grand Prix	24	Engine	6	
Fastest lap： (Italy) Luca Ghiotto (Hitech Grand Prix) — 1:34.181（Lap 25）

Note：

- ^1 - Marcus Armstrong originally finished eleventh, but was given a five-second-overtime penalty for forcing Guanyu Zhou off the track.

=== Sprint race ===
Pos.	No.	Driver	Entrant	Laps	Time/Retired	Grid	Points
1	4	(United Kingdom) Callum Ilott	UNI-Virtuosi	21	34:12.598	3	15
2	6	(Denmark) Christian Lundgaard	ART Grand Prix	21	+5.299	6	12
3	20	(Germany) Mick Schumacher	Prema Racing	21	+6.615	8	10 (2)
4	11	(Switzerland) Louis Delétraz	Charouz Racing System	21	+7.072	1	8
5	21	(Russia) Robert Shwartzman	Prema Racing	21	+7.338	9	6
6	8	(India) Jehan Daruvala	Carlin	21	+10.989	10	4
7	9	(United Kingdom) Jack Aitken	Campos Racing	21	+16.962	13	2
8	24	(Russia) Nikita Mazepin	Hitech Grand Prix	21	+18.782	22	1
9	1	(Estonia) Jüri Vips	DAMS	21	+19.685	11	
10	22	(Israel) Roy Nissany	Trident Racing	21	+30.844	19	
11	14	(Japan) Nobuharu Matsushita	MP Motorsport	21	+31.080	15	
12	17	(France) Giuliano Alesi	BWT HWA Racelab	21	+32.331	18	
13	23	(Japan) Marino Sato	Trident Racing	21	+33.113	20	
14	10	(Brazil) Guilherme Samaia	Campos Racing	21	+41.766	21	
15	25	(Italy) Luca Ghiotto	Hitech Grand Prix	21	+1:00.054	7	
16	16	(Russia) Artem Markelov	BWT HWA Racelab	20	+1 lap	17	
17	12	(Brazil) Pedro Piquet	Charouz Racing System	20	+1 lap	12	
18	5	(New Zealand) Marcus Armstrong	ART Grand Prix	20	+1 lap	14	
DNF	15	(Brazil) Felipe Drugovich	MP Motorsport	16	Collision	16	
DNF	7	(Japan) Yuki Tsunoda	Carlin	15	Mechanical	5	
DNF	3	(China) Guanyu Zhou	UNI-Virtuosi	13	Gearbox	4	
DSQ	2	(United Kingdom) Dan Ticktum	DAMS	21	Disqualified ^{2}	2	
Fastest lap: (Germany) Mick Schumacher (Prema Racing) — 1:34.533（lap 5)

Note：

- ^2 - Dan Ticktum originally finished first, but he was later disqualified due to lack of fuel on finish.

== Standings after the event ==
Drivers' Championship standings

	Pos.	Driver	Points
1	1	(United Kingdom) Callum Ilott	149
1	2	(Germany) Mick Schumacher	143
2	3	(Russia) Robert Shwartzman	140
1	4	(Japan) Yuki Tsunoda	123
2	5	(Denmark) Christian Lundgaard	116

Teams' Championship standings

	Pos.	Team	Points
	1	(Italy) Prema Racing	283
	2	(United Kingdom) UNI-Virtuosi	251
	3	(United Kingdom) Hitech Grand Prix	173
1	4	(France) ART Grand Prix	150
1	5	(United Kingdom) Carlin	146

- Note: Only the top five positions are included for both sets of standings.

== See also ==
- 2020 Italian Grand Prix
- 2020 Monza Formula 3 round

Previous round: 2020 Spa-Francorchamps Formula 2 round	FIA Formula 2 Championship; 2020 season	Next round: 2020 Mugello Formula 2 round
Previous round: 2019 Monza Formula 2 round	Monza Formula 2 round	Next round: 2021 Monza Formula 2 round
