= 2017 Baku Formula 2 round =

Motor races

(Azerbaijan) 2017 Baku Formula 2 round
Round details
- Round 4 of 11 in the 2017 FIA Formula 2 Championship.
- Layout of the Baku City Circuit
- Location: Baku City Circuit, Baku, Azerbaijan
- Course: Temporary racing facility 6.003 km (3.730 mi)

Feature race
- Date: 24 June 2017
- Laps: 29
Pole position
Driver	(Monaco) Charles Leclerc	Prema Racing
Time	1:52.129	
Podium
First	(Monaco) Charles Leclerc	Prema Racing
Second	(Netherlands) Nyck de Vries	Rapax
Third	(Canada) Nicholas Latifi	DAMS
Fastest lap
Driver	(Monaco) Charles Leclerc	Prema Racing
- Time: 1:54.025 (on lap 24)

Sprint race
- Date: 25 June 2017
- Laps: 21
Podium
First	(France) Norman Nato	Arden International
Second	(Monaco) Charles Leclerc	Prema Racing
Third	(Canada) Nicholas Latifi	DAMS
Fastest lap
Driver	(Monaco) Charles Leclerc	Prema Racing
- Time: 1:53.635 (on lap 17)

The 2017 Baku FIA Formula 2 round was a pair of motor races held on 23 and 25 June 2017 at the Baku City Circuit in Baku, Azerbaijan as part of the FIA Formula 2 Championship. It was the fourth round of the 2017 FIA Formula 2 Championship and was run in support of the 2017 Azerbaijan Grand Prix.

== Classifications ==
=== Qualifying ===
Pos.	No.	Driver	Team	Time	Gap	Grid
1	1	(Monaco) Charles Leclerc	Prema Racing	1:52.129	—	1
2	7	(Japan) Nobuharu Matsushita	ART Grand Prix	1:52.697	+0.568	2
3	10	(Canada) Nicholas Latifi	DAMS	1:52.865	+0.736	3
4	18	(Netherlands) Nyck de Vries	Rapax	1:53.018	+0.889	4
5	6	(Russia) Artem Markelov	Russian Time	1:53.135	+1.006	5
6	2	(Italy) Antonio Fuoco	Prema Racing	1:53.220	+1.091	6
7	19	(Venezuela) Johnny Cecotto Jr.	Rapax	1:53.313	+1.184	7
8	17	(Spain) Sergio Canamasas	Trident	1:53.354	+1.225	8
9	9	(United Kingdom) Oliver Rowland	DAMS	1:53.479	+1.350	9
10	12	(Romania) Robert Vișoiu	Campos Racing	1:53.670	+1.541	10
11	14	(Brazil) Sérgio Sette Câmara	MP Motorsport	1:53.853	+1.724	11
12	20	(France) Norman Nato	Arden International	1:53.900	+1.771	12
13	21	(Indonesia) Sean Gelael	Arden International	1:54.032	+1.903	13
14	4	(Sweden) Gustav Malja	Racing Engineering	1:54.286	+2.157	14
15	15	(United Kingdom) Jordan King	MP Motorsport	1:54.295	+2.166	15
16	11	(Switzerland) Ralph Boschung	Campos Racing	1:54.339	+2.210	16
17	8	(Russia) Sergey Sirotkin	ART Grand Prix	1:54.384	+2.255	17
18	3	(Switzerland) Louis Delétraz	Racing Engineering	1:54.688	+2.559	18
19	16	(Malaysia) Nabil Jeffri	Trident	1:54.857	+2.728	19
20	5	(Italy) Luca Ghiotto	Russian Time	2:06.148	+14.019	20

=== Feature Race ===
The race was scheduled for 29 laps; however, an incident in lap 26 brought out the red flag and the race was stopped. The result was counted back at the end of lap 24.

Pos.	No.	Driver	Team	Laps	Time / Gap	Grid	Points
1	1	(Monaco) Charles Leclerc	Prema Racing	24	52:33.196	1	25 (6)
2	18	(Netherlands) Nyck de Vries	Rapax	24	+3.469	4	18
3	10	(Canada) Nicholas Latifi	DAMS	24	+6.390	3	15
4	6	(Russia) Artem Markelov	Russian Time	24	+11.694	5	12
5	20	(France) Norman Nato	Arden International	24	+17.074	12	10
6	15	(United Kingdom) Jordan King	MP Motorsport	24	+18.570	15	8
7	9	(United Kingdom) Oliver Rowland	DAMS	24	+19.090	9	6
8	11	(Switzerland) Ralph Boschung	Campos Racing	24	+21.348	16	4
9	17	(Spain) Sergio Canamasas	Trident	24	+22.870	8	2
10	8	(Russia) Sergey Sirotkin	ART Grand Prix	24	+24.042	17	1
11	4	(Sweden) Gustav Malja	Racing Engineering	24	+24.828	14	
12	7	(Japan) Nobuharu Matsushita	ART Grand Prix	24	+25.696	2	
13	14	(Brazil) Sérgio Sette Câmara	MP Motorsport	24	+29.675	11	
14	21	(Indonesia) Sean Gelael	Arden International	24	+33.101	13	
15	12	(Romania) Robert Vișoiu	Campos Racing	24	+33.320	10	
16	5	(Italy) Luca Ghiotto	Russian Time	24	+49.207	20	
DNF	3	(Switzerland) Louis Delétraz	Racing Engineering	11	Accident	18	
DNF	16	(Malaysia) Nabil Jeffri	Trident	9	Accident	19	
DNF	2	(Italy) Antonio Fuoco	Prema Racing	6	Accident/Wing	6	
DNF	19	(Venezuela) Johnny Cecotto Jr.	Rapax	0	Accident	7	
Fastest lap: (Monaco) Charles Leclerc (Prema Racing) – 1:54.025 (on lap 24)

Ralph Boschung did not make any pit stop but kept his 8th place since the race was stopped by red flag rather than finished.

=== Sprint Race ===
Pos.	No.	Driver	Team	Laps	Time / Gap	Grid	Points
1	20	(France) Norman Nato	Arden International	21	40:37.601	4	15
2	1	(Monaco) Charles Leclerc	Prema Racing	21	+8.717	8	12 (2)
3	10	(Canada) Nicholas Latifi	DAMS	21	+11.574	6	10
4	8	(Russia) Sergey Sirotkin	ART Grand Prix	21	+12.792	10	8
5	6	(Russia) Artem Markelov	Russian Time	21	+12.890	5	6
6	7	(Japan) Nobuharu Matsushita	ART Grand Prix	21	+14.472	12	4
7	5	(Italy) Luca Ghiotto	Russian Time	21	+16.888	16	2
8	11	(Switzerland) Ralph Boschung	Campos Racing	21	+21.387	1	1
9	14	(Brazil) Sérgio Sette Câmara	MP Motorsport	21	+27.343	13	
10	21	(Indonesia) Sean Gelael	Arden International	21	+27.827	14	
11	12	(Romania) Robert Vișoiu	Campos Racing	21	+31.612	15	
12	2	(Italy) Antonio Fuoco	Prema Racing	21	+32.664	19	
13	4	(Sweden) Gustav Malja	Racing Engineering	21	+34.645	11	
14	19	(Venezuela) Johnny Cecotto Jr.	Rapax	21	+35.789	20	
15	17	(Spain) Sergio Canamasas	Trident	21	+49.243	9	
16	3	(Switzerland) Louis Delétraz	Racing Engineering	21	+57.152	17	
17	16	(Malaysia) Nabil Jeffri	Trident	21	+1:38.931	18	
DNF	18	(Netherlands) Nyck de Vries	Rapax	8	Spin	7	
DNF	9	(United Kingdom) Oliver Rowland	DAMS	7	Gearbox	2	
DSQ	15	(United Kingdom) Jordan King	MP Motorsport	21	Disqualified	3	
Fastest lap: (Monaco) Charles Leclerc (Prema Racing) – 1:53.635 (on lap 17)

== Championship standings after the round ==
Drivers' Championship standings

	Pos.	Driver	Points
	1	(Monaco) Charles Leclerc	122
	2	(United Kingdom) Oliver Rowland	80
	3	(Russia) Artem Markelov	78
	4	(Italy) Luca Ghiotto	58
3	5	(Canada) Nicholas Latifi	53

Teams' Championship standings

	Pos.	Team	Points
	1	(Russia) Russian Time	136
	2	(France) DAMS	133
1	3	(Italy) Prema Racing	124
1	4	(France) ART Grand Prix	98
	5	(Italy) Rapax	61

- Note: Only the top five positions are included for both sets of standings.

Previous round: 2017 Monaco FIA Formula 2 round	FIA Formula 2 Championship; 2017 season	Next round: 2017 Red Bull Ring FIA Formula 2 round
Previous round: 2016 Baku GP2 Series round	Baku FIA Formula 2 round	Next round: 2018 Baku FIA Formula 2 round
