= 2020 Sochi Formula 2 round =

(Russia) 2020 Sochi Formula 2 round
Round details
- Round 10 of 12 in the 2020 FIA Formula 2 Championship.
- Layout of the Sochi Autodrom
- Location: Sochi Autodrom; Sochi, Krasnodar Krai, Russia
- Course: Permanent racing circuit 5.848 km (3.630 mi)

Feature race
- Date: 26 September 2020
- Laps: 28
Pole position
Driver	(Japan) Yuki Tsunoda	Carlin
Time	1:48.688	
Podium
First	(Germany) Mick Schumacher	Prema Racing
Second	(Japan) Yuki Tsunoda	Carlin
Third	(United Kingdom) Callum Ilott	Uni-Virtuosi
Fastest lap
Driver	(Japan) Yuki Tsunoda	Carlin
- Time: 1:52.303 (on lap 25)

Sprint race
- Date: 27 September 2020
- Laps: 5
Podium
First	(China) Guanyu Zhou	Uni-Virtuosi
Second	(Russia) Nikita Mazepin	Hitech Grand Prix
Third	(Germany) Mick Schumacher	Prema Racing
Fastest lap
Driver	(Russia) Nikita Mazepin	Hitech Grand Prix
- Time: 1:51.873 (on lap 5)

The 2020 Sochi Formula 2 round was a pair of motor races involving Formula 2 cars that took place on 26 and 27 September 2020 at the Sochi Autodrom in Sochi, Russia. The event is the ten round of the 2020 FIA Formula 2 Championship and ran in support of the 2020 Russian Grand Prix.

== Report ==
=== Qualifying ===
With temperatures hovering at 28 °C on the Black Sea coast the session got underway on Friday afternoon, with Mick Schumacher leading the field out of the pits. The German youth would go on to set the first lap of the session, although it was teammate and title rival Robert Shwartzman who put in the first competitive time, a 1:49.634. Jehan Daruvala then appeared at the top of the times, before being supplanted by Nikita Mazepin as the first set of runs came to a conclusion.

After a cool down lap all 22 drivers went for a second run on their first set of supersoft tyres, with the times at the top coming down again. This time Daruvala found four tenths to return to top spot, with his Carlin teammate Yuki Tsunoda slotting into second ahead of Mazepin. Otherwise it would be marginal gains on the whole for the rest of the field, although debutante Jake Hughes would notably jump to ninth as drivers began heading back to the pits.

Armed with fresh supersofts the field re-emerged with ten minutes to go, with Daruvala again finding a tenth to increase his margin. Tsunoda also improved but could not match the Indian racer's mark, while the two UNI-Virutosis leapt up to third and fourth, Guanyu Zhou ahead of Callum Ilott. With that the field again settled into cool down laps, before once again opting to complete a second run on the same set of supersofts.

This time it was Tsunoda who found the biggest gains, overcoming his one tenth deficit to Daruvala to go fastest with a 1:48.688. Daruvala followed him across the line, although he would harrowingly missout on pole by 0.006s to Tsunoda as the chequered flag fell. Shwartzman then claimed third although he would be shuffled back instantly by Schumacher and Ilott, before Luca Ghiotto and Christian Lundgaard made late runs to also jump the #21 Prema pilot. Regardless, Shwartzman would end the session as the best placed Russian racer in the field, with Nikita Mazepin in tenth and Artem Markelov in twentieth.

=== Feature Race ===
Tsunoda duly exchanged pole position for the lead when the lights went out, sprinting away with Mick Schumacher right on his tail. Indeed, an equally strong start from the German youth would see the #20 Prema jet past Jehan Daruvala, with the Indian racer hampered by the dust on the off-side of the grid. Callum Ilott would likewise lose out to Luca Ghiotto and drop to fifth, with Jack Aitken and Robert Shwartzman also moving up to challenge the UNI-Virtuosi through the first corner.

Into the first braking point of the afternoon and Schumacher had a run on Tsunoda into turn two, although the Japanese racer placed his #7 Carlin on the defensive inside line and held the lead. Behind, Ilott recovered from his poor launch to fire his car right around the outside of Ghiotto to reclaim fourth, before a multi-car collision thinned the field behind. Indeed, as Shwartzman disappeared down the escape road after locking up, Jüri Vips tried a lunge and sent several cars scattering across the exit of turn two. The Estonian racer was on the inside of a three car fight into turn two, with Vips and Pedro Piquet running either side of Louis Delétraz. Vips then moved across and into the path of Delétraz as they braked for turn two, resulting in the #1 DAMS getting spun across the nose of the #11 Charouz and into the sister car of Piquet. Piquet was then pushed into the side of Christian Lundgaard, while Dan Ticktum, Felipe Drugovich, Guilherme Samaia and several others took avoiding action.

Vips was left stranded at turn two, while Lundgaard retired his car on the outside of turn three due to damage. Their abandoned cars would trigger a Safety Car, with Roy Nissany and Felipe Drugovich having also retired in the pits due to damage sustained in the collision, having also got tangled in the incident. Piquet and Delétraz would likewise have to pit to have their front wings replaced, and would be a long way off the back of the field when the race resumed at the start of lap three.

At the restart Tsunoda would bolt, although Schumacher was able to pace him out of the final corner, but ultimately proved too far back to challenge into turn two. Indeed, there would be very little movement in the field at the restart despite the promised influence of the slipstream into turn two. Instead, the only change in the top ten came through turn three and into turn four, with Nikita Mazepin throwing the #24 Hitech down the inside of Zhou into turn four to claim seventh.

With that the order quickly settled, with Tsunoda and Schumacher easing away from Daruvala, while the Indian racer opened a small margin over Ilott, Aitken and Luca Ghiotto. Daruvala subsequently became the first driver to stop at the end of lap six after the pit window formally opened, while Tsunoda and Schumacher carried on until lap eight. Indeed, Schumacher's stop came a something of a surprise to the Prema pitcrew, with boss Rene Rosin visibly shouting at the crew to prepare for the #20 Prema's arrival.

The reason for Rosin's frantic attempts at communication were revealed a few moments later as Shwartzman followed Schumacher into the pits, with Ilott and Ghiotto likewise venturing into the pitlane. Regardless, Schumacher would not be delayed and hence rejoined between Tsunoda and Ilott as before, while Shwartzman suffered a small delay due to the late change. On track, meanwhile, Aitken would move into the lead as the lead driver on the alternate medium-supersoft strategy, while Tsunoda and co. came back on in tenth through sixteenth with Daruvala.

As the race wore on Mazepin made a bid for the lead, only to lock-up when challenging Aitken on the brakes for turn two, the Anglo-Korean racer having taken the inside line to defend from the Russian. Mazepin duly went skating into the run-off and had to take the prescribed path to rejoin, with that delay allowing Zhou to sweep back past to claim second on the road. Elsewhere, Tsunoda and Schumacher were beginning to make their way up the field through those on the alternate strategy, amid news that Prema were under investigation for their stops.

Four laps after Mazepin made his bid for the lead Zhou would have a go at Mazepin, forcing the #3 UNI-Virtuosi down the inside of Aitken on the run to turn two. Aitken finally relented and dived across to take the grippier racing line for the 90° right-hand, leaving Zhou fully committed on the dustier inside line. Zhou would make the corner but run wide on the compromised line, allowing Aitken to sweep back past on the exit and retain the lead.

Zhou tried again a lap later at turn four on lap sixteen, although his look down the inside of the #9 Campos would end in failure, with the Chinese racer duly dropping back behind Mazepin due to lost momentum on the exit. Two laps later and Aitken was in for his stop, a surprise given that there were still eleven laps to go. A lap later and Mazepin and Zhou made their stops along with the rest of those who started on the mediums, promoting Tsunoda back into the lead.

That, however, was not to last, for as Tsunoda moved to the head of the field, Schumacher was plotting a move on the #7 Carlin, getting the slipstream and DRS down into turn two. Tsunoda duly took the defensive inside line into the 90 right, while Schumacher took the racing line to try a move around the outside. However, Tsunoda would wash out wide on the exit of the corner, allowing Schumacher to chop back inside and power past on the run to turn three and secure the lead.

With that Schumacher was away, while Tsunoda quickly slipped into the sights of Ilott, who had shadowed them back up through the field. The Brit would subsequently ease past the Japanese racer down the weaving back straight with the aid of DRS, before sprinting away to chase title rival Schumacher. Tsunoda was hence left in a lonely third, as behind Aitken, Zhou and Mazepin were moving steadily up the field with their fresh supersofts.

Into the closing stages and Ilott had failed to muster a serious challenge for victory, for Schumacher had been able to maintain a one-second buffer to the #4 Virtuosi and hence deny Ilott the aid of DRS. Indeed, Schumacher's title ambitions would be further enhanced by the slow decline of teammate Shwartzman, who slipped from eighth to eleventh in the final laps after moves from Mazepin, Marcus Armstrong and Dan Ticktum. Indeed, since his stop Shwartzman's race had largely fallen apart, with the Russian racer's bid to keep Ticktum at bay through turn three ending with the #21 Prema getting elbowed out onto the dust and marbles.

Back with Ilott and his pace would collapse with three laps to go, allowing Tsunoda to move back onto his tail as they started the final tour. Ilott duly defended Tsunoda's lunge around the outside of turn two, and would get a strong enough exit to deny the #7 Carlin the cut-back on the exit. However, Tsunoda was not so easily resisted, with the Japanese racer completing a breath-taking manoeuvre around the outside of the #4 Virtuosi through turn three to claim second, with Ilott lacking the grip to respond.

That move settled the race order, with Schumacher having escaped by six seconds in the final laps to secure victory, a win the ballooned out his Championship lead to eighteen points. Tsunoda and Ilott then completed the podium ahead of Ghiotto, while Daruvala claimed fifth ahead of a charging Aitken. Mazepin was next up ahead of Zhou, who registered reverse-grid pole for the feature race, while Armstrong and Ticktum rounded out the scorers.

=== Post-Race ===
After the race there would be several investigations facing Prema Racing, after an irregularity was found on Schumacher's car in post-race scrutineering on top of an investigation into Rosin's actions during their pitstops. Schumacher's car was found to be using a superseded crank in its DRS system, which had been replaced on safety grounds after the 2019 Bahrain Sprint Race, with the modified part introduced and mandated from the 2019 Baku Feature Race. Prema defended their position by stating that the part on Schumacher's car had been installed after his qualifying crash at Monza, and hence passed scrutineering for two full events, and the fact that the part was very similar to the one that had replaced it.

After a two-hour investigation the FIA ruled in favour of Prema, declaring that there had been 'no sporting advantage' from the part. Their investigation highlighted the visual similarity of the two cranks, so much so that it was decided that all teams would be given technical drawings of the new part to ensure that they were all installed on the 22 cars for the Sprint Race. Furthermore, Dallara were instructed to design a new part for the 2021 season to avoid further confusion.

There would be more external pressure surrounding the FIA's investigation into Rene Rosin, which was investigated under Article 21.5 of the sporting regulations. That Article was designed to restrict the number of operational personnel allowed to work on an F2 car to twelve during a race meeting, and Rosin's attempts to communicate with the pitcrew were investigated under that ruling. Fortunately for Prema it was ruled that Rosin had had no impact on the pitstop itself due to the ambient noise in the pitlane, although he was fined €10,000 for his actions as they could be 'misconstrued'.

Upon the publication of this ruling four teams, noted as ART Grand Prix, Carlin, DAMS and UNI-Virtuosi, would declare their intent to appeal, with a four-day window to do so, although none would officially lodge a protest before the Sochi Sprint.

=== Sprint Race ===
Zhou duly aced the start to secure the lead at the start, with Jack Aitken likewise making an excellent start from third to claim second. Nikita Mazepin, meanwhile, would find himself under instant attack from Jehan Daruvala and Luca Ghiotto after dropping to third after starting on the dirtier side of the grid. Behind it was a similar story, with those on the racing line getting far better starts than those on the dirty side of the grid.

Into turn two for the first time and Zhou would fend off a half-hearted look from Aitken on the brakes, while Mazepin held the inside line from Daruvala and Ghiotto to hold third. Indeed, that fight would also see Ghiotto forced wide, and hence lose fifth to Mick Schumacher on the exit, the German racer having been the exception to the start rule in leaping from eighth to sixth. Behind, however, there would be chaos on the exit, as Guilherme Samaia and Jake Hughes clashed after the Brazilian racer clattered the outside kerb and had a half spin into the side of the #17 BWT HWA Racelab.

Samaia and Hughes were out as a result, although both were able to drive to safe places to be dragged away from the circuit. Yellow flags were thrown in order to cover their cars' removal from the circuit, which was withdrawn before the end of the opening tour. That meant that fighting could resume with only a brief intervention, with Callum Ilott coming under attack from Yuki Tsunoda into turn two.

While Ilott kept Tsunoda at bay through turn three, Mazepin was working to make up for his miserable start, firing down the inside of Aitken into turn five to reclaim second. With that the Russian racer was off to chase Zhou, although the #3 UNI-Virtuosi had established a two-second lead. Aitken, meanwhile, was left under attack from Schumacher, before a Virtual Safety Car was thrown due to issues removing Samaia's car.

The race resumed as the leaders came through turn four on lap three, with Zhou and Mazepin now well clear of Aitken. Indeed, the Anglo-Korean racer was having to defend hard from Schumacher at the restart, with the #20 Prema trying a lunge down the inside of turn thirteen on the brakes, although Aitken held on. However, the German youth was not deterred, and duly threw his car down the inside of Aitken of the penultimate corner.

Schumacher hence established third and powered away, while Aitken was compromised on the exit and was powerless to prevent Daruvala firing past into the final corner. Aitken was, however, able to respond to Daruvala's move down the start/finish straight with the slipstream, and claimed the inside line into turn two as they hit the brakes. Daruvala tried to resist on the outside of the #9 Campos, but slid wide and had to take the escape road, allowing Ghiotto to close right onto his tail.

As that fight concluded Ilott would lose seventh to Tsunoda, who quickly pulled clear of the Brit, while Ilott drifted back into the sights of Dan Ticktum. Out front, meanwhile, Zhou was holding a small margin over Mazepin, while Schumacher appeared to have settled for third, unable to match the lead duo's pace. Aitken, meanwhile, would hold onto fourth, after Daruvala tried another lunge around the outside of turn two, only to lock his rear wheels and bounce across the kerbs, handing fifth to Ghiotto.

A lap later and Ghiotto was on the back of Aitken and lining up a move into turn two, and duly fired the #25 Hitech down the inside of the #9 Campos to secure fourth. However, Aikten had a better line through the corner and hence got a better exit, allowing him to draw back alongside the Italian racer, crucially with the inside line for turn three. That, however, would be a huge factor a few moments later, as a puncture caused a race ending accident between the two a few moments later.

Indeed, as Aitken held off Ghiotto through the flat out left hander, the Anglo-Korean racer would have a sudden deflation of his right rear tyre, which kicked the car into a small slide. That slide resulted in the #9 Campos slapping the side of the #25 Hitech mid-corner, and hence sending both skating into the outside wall at high speed. Their mutual impacts shredded the tec-pro barriers as both cars ended up buried and with heavy damage, although both Ghiotto and Aitken would escape unaided and without injury.

The extensive barrier damage caused the race to be red flagged, with no time on when the race would restart given. Indeed, the fate of the race was ultimately sealed when Ghiotto's car caught fire while buried in the barriers, resulting in the race being abandoned on lap seven. The final classification was hence based on the finishing order of lap five, with half points awarded due to the fact that the race had not reached 75% of its scheduled distance.

Zhou was hence classified as the winner, claiming 7.5 points, while Mazepin claimed just half a point less for finishing second with the bonus point for fastest lap. Schumacher then completed the podium in third to extend his Championship lead, while Aitken and Ghiotto were still classified in fourth and fifth despite causing the red flag. Tsunoda was next up ahead of Ilott, while Dan Ticktum claimed the final point in eighth.

== Classification ==
=== Qualifying ===
Pos.	No.	Driver	Team	Time	Gap	Grid
1	7	(Japan) Yuki Tsunoda	Carlin	1:48.688		1
2	8	(India) Jehan Daruvala	Carlin	1:48.694	+0.006	2
3	20	(Germany) Mick Schumacher	Prema Racing	1:48.883	+0.195	3
4	4	(United Kingdom) Callum Ilott	UNI-Virtuosi	1:49.047	+0.359	4
5	25	(Italy) Luca Ghiotto	Hitech Grand Prix	1:49.230	+0.542	5
6	6	(Denmark) Christian Lundgaard	ART Grand Prix	1:49.252	+0.564	6
7	21	(Russia) Robert Shwartzman	Prema Racing	1:49.284	+0.596	7
8	9	(United Kingdom) Jack Aitken	Campos Racing	1:49.306	+0.618	8
9	3	(China) Guanyu Zhou	UNI-Virtuosi	1:49.311	+0.623	9
10	24	(Russia) Nikita Mazepin	Hitech Grand Prix	1:49.474	+0.786	10
11	1	(Estonia) Jüri Vips	DAMS	1:49.639	+0.951	11
12	12	(Brazil) Pedro Piquet	Charouz Racing System	1:49.680	+0.992	12
13	11	(Switzerland) Louis Delétraz	Charouz Racing System	1:49.699	+1.011	13
14	5	(New Zealand) Marcus Armstrong	ART Grand Prix	1:49.869	+1.181	14
15	17	(United Kingdom) Jake Hughes	BWT HWA Racelab	1:49.962	+1.274	15
16	15	(Brazil) Felipe Drugovich	MP Motorsport	1:49.976	+1.288	16
17	2	(United Kingdom) Dan Ticktum	DAMS	1:50.214	+1.526	17
18	23	(Japan) Marino Sato	Trident	1:50.349	+1.661	18
19	22	(Israel) Roy Nissany	Trident	1:50.456	+1.768	19
20	16	(Russia) Artem Markelov	BWT HWA Racelab	1:50.488	+1.800	20
21	14	(France) Giuliano Alesi	MP Motorsport	1:50.943	+2.255	21
22	10	(Brazil) Guilherme Samaia	Campos Racing	1:51.375	+2.687	22

=== Feature race ===
Pos.	No.	Driver	Entrant	Laps	Time/Retired	Grid	Points
1	20	(Germany) Mick Schumacher	Prema Racing	28	55:02.871	3	25
2	7	(Japan) Yuki Tsunoda	Carlin	28	+6.358	1	18 (4)
3	4	(United Kingdom) Callum Ilott	UNI-Virtuosi	28	+9.482	4	15
4	25	(Italy) Luca Ghiotto	Hitech Grand Prix	28	+9.507	5	12
5	8	(India) Jehan Daruvala	Carlin	28	+15.225	2	10
6	9	(United Kingdom) Jack Aitken	Campos Racing	28	+22.183	8	8
7	24	(Russia) Nikita Mazepin	Hitech Grand Prix	28	+23.129	10	6
8	3	(China) Guanyu Zhou	UNI-Virtuosi	28	+25.392	9	4
9	5	(New Zealand) Marcus Armstrong	ART Grand Prix	28	+26.940	14	2
10	2	(United Kingdom) Dan Ticktum	DAMS	28	+29.525	17	1 (2)
11	21	(Russia) Robert Shwartzman	Prema Racing	28	+35.582	7	
12	17	(United Kingdom) Jake Hughes	BWT HWA Racelab	28	+37.535	15	
13	23	(Japan) Marino Sato	Trident Racing	28	+46.326	18	
14	14	(France) Giuliano Alesi	MP Motorsport	28	+48.045	21	
15	16	(Russia) Artem Markelov	BWT HWA Racelab	28	+52.107	20	
16	10	(Brazil) Guilherme Samaia	Campos Racing	28	+1:07.006	22	
17	12	(Brazil) Pedro Piquet	Charouz Racing System	28	+1:08.704	12	
18	11	(Switzerland) Louis Delétraz	Charouz Racing System	28	+1:19.307	13	
DNF	22	(Israel) Roy Nissany	Trident Racing	1	Collision damage	19	
DNF	15	(Brazil) Felipe Drugovich	MP Motorsport	1	Collision damage	16	
DNF	6	(Denmark) Christian Lundgaard	ART Grand Prix	0	Collision	6	
DNF	1	(Estonia) Jüri Vips	DAMS	0	Collision	11	
Fastest lap： (United Kingdom) Dan Ticktum (DAMS) — 1:51.700(lap 28)

=== Sprint race ===
The race was originally scheduled for 21 laps, but has been red-flagged on lap 7 after a huge collision between Luca Ghiotto and Jack Aitken. As a result of the incident and the extensive construction measures around the circuit, the organizers then decided that the race would not be restarted and the result of the race was counted by 5 laps. Since 75% of the predetermined distance has not been completed, only half of the points were awarded in this race.

Pos.	No.	Driver	Entrant	Laps	Time/Retired	Grid	Points
1	3	(China) Guanyu Zhou	UNI-Virtuosi	5	10:01.184	1	7.5
2	24	(Russia) Nikita Mazepin	Hitech Grand Prix	5	+0.818	2	6 (1)
3	20	(Germany) Mick Schumacher	Prema Racing	5	+4.816	8	5
4	9	(United Kingdom) Jack Aitken	Campos Racing	5	+6.459	3	4
5	25	(Italy) Luca Ghiotto	Hitech Grand Prix	5	+7.670	5	3
6	7	(Japan) Yuki Tsunoda	Carlin	5	+8.282	7	2
7	4	(United Kingdom) Callum Ilott	UNI-Virtuosi	5	+9.141	6	1
8	2	(United Kingdom) Dan Ticktum	DAMS	5	+9.769	10	0.5
9	12	(Brazil) Pedro Piquet	Charouz Racing System	5	+10.506	17	
10	21	(Russia) Robert Shwartzman	Prema Racing	5	+11.244	11	
11	8	(India) Jehan Daruvala	Carlin	5	+11.988^{1}	4	
12	16	(Russia) Artem Markelov	BWT HWA Racelab	5	+12.438	15	
13	6	(Denmark) Christian Lundgaard	ART Grand Prix	5	+13.536	21	
14	5	(New Zealand) Marcus Armstrong	ART Grand Prix	5	+14.053	9	
15	23	(Japan) Marino Sato	Trident Racing	5	+14.611	13	
16	14	(France) Giuliano Alesi	MP Motorsport	5	+15.032	14	
17	11	(Switzerland) Louis Delétraz	Charouz Racing System	5	+15.717	18	
18	1	(Estonia) Jüri Vips	DAMS	5	+17.100	22	
19	22	(Israel) Roy Nissany	Trident Racing	5	+17.757	19	
20	15	(Brazil) Felipe Drugovich	MP Motorsport	5	+38.002	20	
DNF	17	(United Kingdom) Jake Hughes	BWT HWA Racelab	0	Collision	12	
DNF	10	(Brazil) Guilherme Samaia	Campos Racing	0	Collision	16	
Fastest lap： (Russia) Nikita Mazepin (Hitech Grand Prix) — 1:51.873(lap 5)

Notes：

- ^1 - Jehan Daruvala originally finished fifth, but was given a five-second time penalty for corner cutting.

== Standings after the event ==
Drivers' Championship standings

	Pos.	Driver	Points
	1	(Germany) Mick Schumacher	191
	2	(United Kingdom) Callum Ilott	169
3	3	(Japan) Yuki Tsunoda	147
1	4	(Denmark) Christian Lundgaard	145
1	5	(Russia) Robert Shwartzman	140

Teams' Championship standings

Pos.	Team	Points
1	(Italy) Prema Racing	331
2	(United Kingdom) UNI-Virtuosi	288.5
3	(United Kingdom) Hitech Grand Prix	244
4	(France) ART Grand Prix	183
5	(United Kingdom) Carlin	183

- Note: Only the top five positions are included for both sets of standings.

== See also ==
- 2020 Russian Grand Prix

Previous round: 2020 Mugello Formula 2 round	FIA Formula 2 Championship; 2020 season	Next round: 2020 Sakhir Formula 2 round
Previous round: 2019 Sochi Formula 2 round	Sochi Formula 2 round	Next round: 2021 Sochi Formula 2 round
