= 2020 Spa-Francorchamps Formula 2 round =

(Belgium) 2020 Spa-Francorchamps Formula 2 round
Round details
- Round 7 of 12 in the 2020 FIA Formula 2 Championship.
- Layout of the Circuit de Spa-Francorchamps
- Location: Circuit de Spa-Francorchamps, Stavelot, Belgium
- Course: Permanent racing facility 7.004 km (4.352 mi)

Feature race
- Date: 29 August 2020
- Laps: 25
Pole position
Driver	(Japan) Yuki Tsunoda	Carlin
Time	1:57.593	
Podium
First	(Japan) Yuki Tsunoda	Carlin
Second	(Russia) Nikita Mazepin	Hitech Grand Prix
Third	(Germany) Mick Schumacher	Prema Racing
Fastest lap
Driver	(Russia) Robert Shwartzman	Prema Racing
- Time: 2:01.092 (on lap 12)

Sprint race
- Date: 30 August 2020
- Laps: 18
Podium
First	(Russia) Robert Shwartzman	Prema Racing
Second	(Germany) Mick Schumacher	Prema Racing
Third	(China) Guanyu Zhou	UNI-Virtuosi
Fastest lap
Driver	(United Kingdom) Jack Aitken	Campos Racing
- Time: 2:00.884 (on lap 16)

The 2020 Spa-Francorchamps FIA Formula 2 round was a pair of motor races for Formula 2 cars that took place on 29–30 August 2020 at the Circuit de Spa-Francorchamps in Stavelot, Belgium as part of the FIA Formula 2 Championship. It was the seventh round of the 2020 FIA Formula 2 Championship and ran in support of the 2020 Belgian Grand Prix.

== Report ==
Yuki Tsunoda achieved his second pole, setting a time 0.128 seconds faster than Nikita Mazepin in qualifying. Mazepin crossed the finish line first in the race but he was handed a five second time penalty for forcing Tsunoda off the track multiple times. Mick Schumacher was the other person on the podium.

Shwartzman benefited from a good start and a collision between race leaders Dan Ticktum and Roy Nissany, reclaiming the championship lead from Ilott with the sprint race win. Schumacher returned to the podium, bringing Prema their first double on the finish of the sprint race. Guanyu Zhou completed the podium.

== Classification ==
=== Qualifying ===
Pos.	No.	Driver	Team	Time	Gap	Grid
1	7	(Japan) Yuki Tsunoda	Carlin	1:57.593		1
2	24	(Russia) Nikita Mazepin	Hitech Grand Prix	1:57.721	+0.128	2
3	14	(Japan) Nobuharu Matsushita	MP Motorsport	1:57.844	+0.251	3
4	21	(Russia) Robert Shwartzman	Prema Racing	1:57.861	+0.268	4
5	15	(Brazil) Felipe Drugovich	MP Motorsport	1:58.014	+0.421	5
6	3	(China) Guanyu Zhou	UNI-Virtuosi	1:58.022	+0.429	6
7	20	(Germany) Mick Schumacher	Prema Racing	1:58.076	+0.483	7
8	11	(Switzerland) Louis Delétraz	Charouz Racing System	1:58.080	+0.487	8
9	8	(India) Jehan Daruvala	Carlin	1:58.137	+0.544	9
10	25	(Italy) Luca Ghiotto	Hitech Grand Prix	1:58.168	+0.575	10
11	12	(Brazil) Pedro Piquet	Charouz Racing System	1:58.194	+0.601	11
12	4	(United Kingdom) Callum Ilott	UNI-Virtuosi	1:58.259	+0.666	12
13	5	(New Zealand) Marcus Armstrong	ART Grand Prix	1:58.318	+0.725	13
14	2	(United Kingdom) Dan Ticktum	DAMS	1:58.391	+0.798	14
15	22	(Israel) Roy Nissany	Trident	1:58.578	+0.985	15
16	23	(Japan) Marino Sato	Trident	1:58.959	+1.366	16
17	9	(United Kingdom) Jack Aitken	Campos Racing	1:59.007	+1.414	17
18	6	(Denmark) Christian Lundgaard	ART Grand Prix	1:59.079	+1.486	18
19	16	(Russia) Artem Markelov	BWT HWA Racelab	1:59.207	+1.614	19
20	17	(France) Giuliano Alesi	BWT HWA Racelab	2:02.991	+5.398	20
21	10	(Brazil) Guilherme Samaia	Campos Racing	2:30.794	+33.201	21
22	1	(Estonia) Jüri Vips	DAMS	no time	no time	22

=== Feature race ===
Pos.	No.	Driver	Entrant	Laps	Time/Retired	Grid	Points
1	7	(Japan) Yuki Tsunoda	Carlin	25	53:42.538	1	25 (4)
2	24	(Russia) Nikita Mazepin	Hitech Grand Prix	25	+4.430^{1}	2	18
3	20	(Germany) Mick Schumacher	Prema Racing	25	+5.639	7	15
4	11	(Switzerland) Louis Delétraz	Charouz Racing System	25	+10.381	8	12
5	21	(Russia) Robert Shwartzman	Prema Racing	25	+13.595	4	10 (2)
6	2	(United Kingdom) Dan Ticktum	DAMS	25	+16.218	14	8
7	3	(China) Guanyu Zhou	UNI-Virtuosi	25	+16.453	6	6
8	22	(Israel) Roy Nissany	Trident Racing	25	+20.792	15	4
9	25	(Italy) Luca Ghiotto	Hitech Grand Prix	25	+24.222	10	2
10	4	(United Kingdom) Callum Ilott	UNI-Virtuosi	25	+25.808	12	1
11	1	(Estonia) Jüri Vips	DAMS	25	+28.877	21	
12	12	(Brazil) Pedro Piquet	Charouz Racing System	25	+29.776	11	
13	9	(United Kingdom) Jack Aitken	Campos Racing	25	+36.613	17	
14	23	(Japan) Marino Sato	Trident Racing	25	+38.942	16	
15	5	(New Zealand) Marcus Armstrong	ART Grand Prix	25	+36.414^{2}	13	
16	16	(Russia) Artem Markelov	BWT HWA Racelab	25	+44.258	19	
17	6	(Denmark) Christian Lundgaard	ART Grand Prix	25	+46.051	18	
18	17	(France) Giuliano Alesi	BWT HWA Racelab	25	+47.045	20	
19	8	(India) Jehan Daruvala	Carlin	25	+1:32.794	9	
DNF	10	(Brazil) Guilherme Samaia	Campos Racing	15	Retired	22	
DNF	14	(Japan) Nobuharu Matsushita	MP Motorsport	3	Collision ^{3}	3	
DSQ	15	(Brazil) Felipe Drugovich	MP Motorsport	25	Disqualified ^{4}	5	
Fastest lap： (Russia) Robert Shwartzman (Prema Racing) — 2:01.092（lap 12）

Note：

- ^1 – Nikita Mazepin originally finished first, but was given a five second penalty for forcing Yuki Tsunoda off track and was classified second.
- ^2 – Marcus Armstrong originally finished the race in thirteenth place, but was given a five second penalty after the race for leaving the track and gaining an advantage after passing Jack Aitken and was classified fifteenth.
- ^3 – Nobuharu Matsushita collided with Felipe Drugovich on the third lap and was given a three place grid penalty for the sprint race.
- ^4 – Felipe Drugovich originally finished the race in 20th place but was disqualified after pitting on the last lap, which violates Article 37.6 of the race rules, In addition, he started the sprint race from the back of the grid.

=== Sprint race ===
Pos.	No.	Driver	Entrant	Laps	Time/Retired	Grid	Points
1	21	(Russia) Robert Shwartzman	Prema Racing	18	42:44.391	4	15 (2)
2	20	(Germany) Mick Schumacher	Prema Racing	18	+9.025	6	12
3	3	(China) Guanyu Zhou	UNI-Virtuosi	18	+11.193	2	10
4	24	(Russia) Nikita Mazepin	Hitech Grand Prix	18	+20.945	7	8
5	25	(Italy) Luca Ghiotto	Hitech Grand Prix	18	+21.907	9	6
6	11	(Switzerland) Louis Delétraz	Charouz Racing System	18	+25.182	5	4
7	6	(Denmark) Christian Lundgaard	ART Grand Prix	18	+26.796	17	2
8	16	(Russia) Artem Markelov	BWT HWA Racelab	18	+30.492	16	1
9	7	(Japan) Yuki Tsunoda	Carlin	18	+30.559^{5}	8	
10	2	(United Kingdom) Dan Ticktum	DAMS	18	+32.126	3	
11	1	(Estonia) Jüri Vips	DAMS	18	+32.331	PL	
12	12	(Brazil) Pedro Piquet	Charouz Racing System	18	+32.832	12	
13	15	(Brazil) Felipe Drugovich	MP Motorsport	18	+33.041	21	
14	17	(France) Giuliano Alesi	BWT HWA Racelab	18	+33.448	18	
15	10	(Brazil) Guilherme Samaia	Campos Racing	18	+34.729	20	
16	8	(India) Jehan Daruvala	Carlin	18	+44.078	19	
17	9	(United Kingdom) Jack Aitken	Campos Racing	18	+1:16.304^{6}	13	
DNF	23	(Japan) Marino Sato	Trident Racing	13	Collision	14	
DNF	5	(New Zealand) Marcus Armstrong	ART Grand Prix	9	Collision	15	
DNF	22	(Israel) Roy Nissany	Trident Racing	3	Collision	1	
DNF	4	(United Kingdom) Callum Ilott	UNI-Virtuosi	0	Collision	10	
DNS	14	(Japan) Nobuharu Matsushita	MP Motorsport		Did not start ^{7}		
Fastest lap： (Russia) Robert Shwartzman (Prema Racing) — 2:01.124 (lap 7)

Note

- ^5 – Yuki Tsunoda originally finished in seventh place, but was given a five second time penalty for causing a collision.
- ^6 – Jack Aitken was given a ten second stop/go penalty after failing to start from the correct starting position.
- ^7 – Nobuharu Matsushita could not start the Sprint Race due to car damage sustained in the Feature Race after a collision with Felipe Drugovich.

== Standings after the event ==
Drivers' Championship standings

	Pos.	Driver	Points
1	1	(Russia) Robert Shwartzman	132
1	2	(United Kingdom) Callum Ilott	122
1	3	(Japan) Yuki Tsunoda	111
1	4	(Germany) Mick Schumacher	106
2	5	(Russia) Nikita Mazepin	101

Teams' Championship standings

	Pos.	Team	Points
1	1	(Italy) Prema Racing	238
1	2	(United Kingdom) UNI-Virtuosi	214
1	3	(United Kingdom) Hitech Grand Prix	152
2	4	(United Kingdom) Carlin	129
2	5	(France) ART Grand Prix	123

- Note: Only the top five positions are included for both sets of standings.

== See also ==
- 2020 Belgian Grand Prix
- 2020 Spa-Francorchamps Formula 3 round

Previous round: 2020 Barcelona Formula 2 round	FIA Formula 2 Championship; 2020 season	Next round: 2020 Monza Formula 2 round
Previous round: 2019 Spa-Francorchamps Formula 2 round	Spa-Francorchamps Formula 2 round	Next round: 2022 Spa-Francorchamps Formula 2 round
