= 2021 Sochi Formula 2 round =

(Russia) 2021 Sochi Formula 2 round
Round details
- Round 6 of 8 in the 2021 FIA Formula 2 Championship.
- Location: Sochi Autodrom, Sochi, Russia
- Course: Permanent Circuit; 5.848 km (3.634 mi)

Sprint race 1
- Date: 25 September 2021
- Laps: 18
Podium
First	(United Kingdom) Dan Ticktum	Carlin
Second	(Estonia) Jüri Vips	Hitech Grand Prix
Third	(Russia) Robert Shwartzman	Prema Racing
Fastest lap
Driver	(France) Théo Pourchaire	ART Grand Prix
- Time: 1:50.669 (on lap 16)

Sprint race 2
- Date: 25 September 2021
- Laps: 18
Podium
First	Race cancelled	N/A
Second	Race cancelled	N/A
Third	Race cancelled	N/A
Fastest lap
Driver	Race cancelled	N/A
- Time: NC

Feature race
- Date: 26 September 2021
- Laps: 28
Pole position
Driver	(Australia) Oscar Piastri	Prema Racing
Time	1:47.465	
Podium
First	(Australia) Oscar Piastri	Prema Racing
Second	(France) Théo Pourchaire	ART Grand Prix
Third	(India) Jehan Daruvala	Carlin
Fastest lap
Driver	(New Zealand) Liam Lawson	Hitech Grand Prix
- Time: 1:50.917 (on lap 20)

The 2021 Sochi Formula 2 round the sixth round of the 2021 Formula 2 Championship and took place at the Sochi Autodrom from 24 to 25 September. It ran in support of the 2021 Russian Grand Prix and was planned to feature three races. However, the second sprint race was cancelled amid bad weather conditions. This is the first cancelled Formula 2 race since the cancellation of the sprint race during the 2019 Spa-Francorchamps Formula 2 round due to Anthoine Hubert's fatal accident.

== Classification ==
=== Qualifying ===
Pos.	No.	Driver	Team	Time	Gap	Grid
1	2	(Australia) Oscar Piastri	Prema Racing	1:47.465	-	1
2	6	(India) Jehan Daruvala	Carlin	1:47.653	+0.188	2
3	10	(France) Théo Pourchaire	ART Grand Prix	1:47.891	+0.426	3
4	3	(China) Guanyu Zhou	UNI-Virtuosi Racing	1:47.994	+0.529	4
5	21	(Switzerland) Ralph Boschung	Campos Racing	1:48.024	+0.559	5
6	22	(United Kingdom) Jake Hughes	HWA Racelab	1:48.073	+0.608	6
7	1	(Russia) Robert Shwartzman	Prema Racing	1:48.098	+0.633	7
8	7	(New Zealand) Liam Lawson	Hitech Grand Prix	1:48.129	+0.664	8
9	8	(Estonia) Jüri Vips	Hitech Grand Prix	1:48.139	+0.674	9
10	5	(United Kingdom) Dan Ticktum	Carlin	1:48.171	+0.706	10
11	17	(New Zealand) Marcus Armstrong	DAMS	1:48.190	+0.725	11
12	9	(Denmark) Christian Lundgaard	ART Grand Prix	1:48.255	+0.790	12
13	4	(Brazil) Felipe Drugovich	UNI-Virtuosi Racing	1:48.286	+0.821	13
14	20	(Germany) David Beckmann	Campos Racing	1:48.428	+0.963	14
15	11	(Netherlands) Richard Verschoor	MP Motorsport	1:48.587	+1.122	15
16	24	(Netherlands) Bent Viscaal	Trident	1:48.662	+1.197	16
17	12	(Germany) Lirim Zendeli	MP Motorsport	1:48.785	+1.320	17
18	16	(Israel) Roy Nissany	DAMS	1:48.989	+1.524	18
19	15	(Brazil) Guilherme Samaia	Charouz Racing System	1:49.226	+1.761	19
20	25	(Japan) Marino Sato	Trident	1:49.339	+1.874	20
21	14	(Brazil) Enzo Fittipaldi	Charouz Racing System	1:49.465	+2.000	21
22	23	(Italy) Alessio Deledda	HWA Racelab	1:50.389	+2.924	22

=== Sprint race 1 ===
Pos.	No.	Driver	Team	Laps	Time/Retired	Grid	Points
1	5	(United Kingdom) Dan Ticktum	Carlin	18	36:37.195	1	15
2	8	(Estonia) Jüri Vips	Hitech Grand Prix	18	+4.422	2	12
3	1	(Russia) Robert Shwartzman	Prema Racing	18	+6.638	4	10
4	22	(United Kingdom) Jake Hughes	HWA Racelab	18	+8.894	5	8
5	10	(France) Théo Pourchaire	ART Grand Prix	18	+9.824	8	6 (2)
6	21	(Switzerland) Ralph Boschung	Campos Racing	18	+12.994	6	4
7	9	(Denmark) Christian Lundgaard	ART Grand Prix	18	+13.669	12	2
8	11	(Netherlands) Richard Verschoor	MP Motorsport	18	+14.172	15	1
9	2	(Australia) Oscar Piastri	Prema Racing	18	+14.921	10	
10	12	(Germany) Lirim Zendeli	MP Motorsport	18	+17.268	17	
11	17	(New Zealand) Marcus Armstrong	DAMS	18	+18.179	11	
12	6	(India) Jehan Daruvala	Carlin	18	+28.131	9	
13	15	(Brazil) Guilherme Samaia	Charouz Racing System	18	+28.764	19	
14	25	(Japan) Marino Sato	Trident	18	+40.661	20	
15	20	(Germany) David Beckmann	Campos Racing	18	+57.671	14	
16	16	(Israel) Roy Nissany	DAMS	18	+1:10.465	18	
17	14	(Brazil) Enzo Fittipaldi	Charouz Racing System	18	+1:11.672	21	
18	23	(Italy) Alessio Deledda	HWA Racelab	18	+1:33.339	22	
DNF	7	(New Zealand) Liam Lawson	Hitech Grand Prix	5	Accident	3	
DNF	24	(Netherlands) Bent Viscaal	Trident	3	Collision	16	
DNS	3	(China) Guanyu Zhou	UNI-Virtuosi Racing	—	Spun off	7	
DNS	4	(Brazil) Felipe Drugovich	UNI-Virtuosi Racing	—	Accident	13	
Fastest lap： (France) Théo Pourchaire − ART Grand Prix − 1:50.669 (lap 16)

=== Sprint race 2 ===
The second sprint race was cancelled due to heavy rainfall, which led to postponement of the first races of Formula 2 and Formula 3.

=== Feature Race ===
Pos.	No.	Driver	Team	Laps	Time/Retired	Grid	Points
1	2	(Australia) Oscar Piastri	Prema Racing	28	53:20.402	1	25 (4)
2	10	(France) Théo Pourchaire	ART Grand Prix	28	+1.928	3	18
3	6	(India) Jehan Daruvala	Carlin	28	+12.601	2	15
4	1	(Russia) Robert Shwartzman	Prema Racing	28	+14.485	7	12
5	5	(United Kingdom) Dan Ticktum	Carlin	28	+18.058	10	10
6	3	(China) Guanyu Zhou	UNI-Virtuosi Racing	28	+22.177	4	8
7	7	(New Zealand) Liam Lawson	Hitech Grand Prix	28	+30.596	8	6 (2)
8	11	(Netherlands) Richard Verschoor	MP Motorsport	28	+33.451	15	4
9	9	(Denmark) Christian Lundgaard	ART Grand Prix	28	+37.775	12	2
10	20	(Germany) David Beckmann	Campos Racing	28	+39.118	14	1
11	17	(New Zealand) Marcus Armstrong	DAMS	28	+43.824	11	
12	14	(Brazil) Enzo Fittipaldi	Charouz Racing System	28	+44.482	21	
13	15	(Brazil) Guilherme Samaia	Charouz Racing System	28	+45.798	19	
14	25	(Japan) Marino Sato	Trident	28	+51.902	20	
15	16	(Israel) Roy Nissany	DAMS	28	+58.191	18	
16	12	(Germany) Lirim Zendeli	MP Motorsport	28	+1:08.370	17	
17	23	(Italy) Alessio Deledda	HWA Racelab	28	+1:24.953	22	
18	22	(United Kingdom) Jake Hughes	HWA Racelab	27	+1 lap	6	
19	21	(Switzerland) Ralph Boschung	Campos Racing	25	Puncture	5	
DNF	8	(Estonia) Jüri Vips	Hitech Grand Prix	6	Mechanical	9	
DNF	24	(Netherlands) Bent Viscaal	Trident	0	Collision	16	
DNS	4	(Brazil) Felipe Drugovich	UNI-Virtuosi Racing	—	Injured after crash	13	
Fastest lap： (New Zealand) Liam Lawson − Hitech Grand Prix − 1:50.917 (lap 20)

== Standings after the event ==
Drivers' Championship standings

Pos.	Driver	Points
1	(Australia) Oscar Piastri	178
2	(China) Guanyu Zhou	142
3	(Russia) Robert Shwartzman	135
4	(United Kingdom) Dan Ticktum	129
5	(France) Théo Pourchaire	120

Teams' Championship standings

	Pos.	Team	Points
	1	(Italy) Prema Racing	313
1	2	(United Kingdom) Carlin	225
1	3	(United Kingdom) UNI-Virtuosi Racing	201
	4	(United Kingdom) Hitech Grand Prix	182
	5	(France) ART Grand Prix	163

- Note: Only the top five positions are included for both sets of standings.

== See also ==
- 2021 Russian Grand Prix
- 2021 Sochi Formula 3 round

Previous round: 2021 Monza Formula 2 round	FIA Formula 2 Championship; 2021 season	Next round: 2021 Jeddah Formula 2 round
Previous round: 2020 Sochi Formula 2 round	Sochi Formula 2 round	Next round: none
