= 2020 Barcelona Formula 2 round =

Motor racing competition

(Spain) 2020 Barcelona Formula 2 round
Round details
- Round 6 of 12 in the 2020 FIA Formula 2 Championship.
- Layout of the Circuit de Barcelona-Catalunya
- Location: Circuit de Barcelona-Catalunya, Montmeló, Catalonia, Spain
- Course: Permanent racing facility 4.655 km (2.892 mi)

Feature race
- Date: 15 August 2020
- Laps: 35
Pole position
Driver	(United Kingdom) Callum Ilott	UNI-Virtuosi Racing
Time	1:28.381	
Podium
First	(Japan) Nobuharu Matsushita	MP Motorsport
Second	(Russia) Robert Shwartzman	Prema Racing
Third	(China) Guanyu Zhou	UNI-Virtuosi Racing
Fastest lap
Driver	(Japan) Nobuharu Matsushita	MP Motorsport
- Time: 1:32.902 (on lap 35)

Sprint race
- Date: 16 August 2020
- Laps: 26
Podium
First	(Brazil) Felipe Drugovich	MP Motorsport
Second	(Italy) Luca Ghiotto	Hitech Grand Prix
Third	(Germany) Mick Schumacher	Prema Racing
Fastest lap
Driver	(France) Giuliano Alesi	BWT HWA Racelab
- Time: 1:33.413 (on lap 21)

The 2020 Barcelona FIA Formula 2 round was a pair of motor races for Formula 2 cars that took place on 15–16 August 2020 at the Circuit de Barcelona-Catalunya in Catalonia, Spain as part of the FIA Formula 2 Championship. It was the sixth round of the 2020 FIA Formula 2 Championship and ran in support of the 2020 Spanish Grand Prix.

It was the first time since 2018 where one team secured a double lock-up in terms of wins in both races as Dutch outfit MP Motorsport won both the Feature Race and Sprint Race with Nobuharu Matsushita and Felipe Drugovich respectively. The last team to do that was ART Grand Prix, coincidentally at the same venue.

== Report ==
=== Qualifying ===
Callum Ilott continued to score poles, outpacing Robert Shwartzman in the Barcelona Qualifying.

=== Feature race ===
Nobuharu Matsushita was the only driver who had a pit-stop during the safety car period after Sean Gelael and Giuliano Alesi tangled. It helped Matsushita to achieve win after start from the 18th on the grid, which as 2020 Barcelona Formula 2 round is the farthest starting position to take a race win in the history of FIA Formula 2 Championship and this was the first time since the previous GP2 Series 2011 Hungaroring sprint race when Stefano Coletti won from the 21st grid, when the race has been won from the same place or further back. While Shwartzman and Guanyu Zhou completed the podium. Gelael was injured after collision with Jack Aitken on the final lap, resulting his missing in the sprint race and the four further race weekends.

=== Sprint race ===
Ilott wasn't able again to convert pole into the race victory in the sprint race. While Matsushita's teammate Felipe Drugovich won the race ahead of Luca Ghiotto and Mick Schumacher.

== Classification ==
=== Qualifying ===
Pos.	No.	Driver	Team	Time	Gap	Grid
1	4	(United Kingdom) Callum Ilott	UNI-Virtuosi Racing	1:28.381		1
2	21	(Russia) Robert Shwartzman	Prema Racing	1:28.564	+0.183	2
3	3	(China) Guanyu Zhou	UNI-Virtuosi Racing	1:28.601	+0.220	3
4	15	(Brazil) Felipe Drugovich	MP Motorsport	1:28.767	+0.386	4
5	20	(Germany) Mick Schumacher	Prema Racing	1:28.889	+0.508	5
6	7	(Japan) Yuki Tsunoda	Carlin	1:28.903	+0.522	6
7	9	(United Kingdom) Jack Aitken	Campos Racing	1:28.979	+0.598	7
8	2	(United Kingdom) Dan Ticktum	DAMS	1:28.986	+0.605	8
9	24	(Russia) Nikita Mazepin	Hitech Grand Prix	1:29.033	+0.652	9
10	11	(Switzerland) Louis Delétraz	Charouz Racing System	1:29.199	+0.818	10
11	16	(Russia) Artem Markelov	BWT HWA Racelab	1:29.297	+0.916	11
12	8	(India) Jehan Daruvala	Carlin	1:29.308	+0.927	12
13	1	(Indonesia) Sean Gelael	DAMS	1:29.316	+0.935	13
14	6	(Denmark) Christian Lundgaard	ART Grand Prix	1:29.333	+0.952	14
15	22	(Israel) Roy Nissany	Trident	1:29.469	+1.088	15
16	23	(Japan) Marino Sato	Trident	1:29.493	+1.112	16
17	12	(Brazil) Pedro Piquet	Charouz Racing System	1:29.524	+1.143	17
18	14	(Japan) Nobuharu Matsushita	MP Motorsport	1:29.641	+1.260	18
19	5	(New Zealand) Marcus Armstrong	ART Grand Prix	1:29.686	+1.305	19
20	25	(Italy) Luca Ghiotto	Hitech Grand Prix	1:29.690	+1.309	20
21	17	(France) Giuliano Alesi	BWT HWA Racelab	1:29.748	+1.367	21
22	10	(Brazil) Guilherme Samaia	Campos Racing	1:30.093	+1.712	22

=== Feature race ===
Pos.	No.	Driver	Team	Laps	Time/Retired	Grid	Points
1	14	(Japan) Nobuharu Matsushita	MP Motorsport	35	1:02:14.783	18	25 (2)
2	21	(Russia) Robert Shwartzman	Prema Racing	35	+1.599	2	18
3	3	(China) Guanyu Zhou	UNI-Virtuosi Racing	35	+6.166	3	15
4	7	(Japan) Yuki Tsunoda	Carlin	35	+7.796	6	12
5	4	(United Kingdom) Callum Ilott	UNI-Virtuosi Racing	35	+7.954	1	10 (4)
6	20	(Germany) Mick Schumacher	Prema Racing	35	+8.471	5	8
7	15	(Brazil) Felipe Drugovich	MP Motorsport	35	+8.831	4	6
8	25	(Italy) Luca Ghiotto	Hitech Grand Prix	35	+8.992	20	4
9	2	(United Kingdom) Dan Ticktum	DAMS	35	+9.438	8	2
10	11	(Switzerland) Louis Delétraz	Charouz Racing System	35	+9.494	10	1
11	6	(Denmark) Christian Lundgaard	ART Grand Prix	35	+9.658	14	
12	16	(Russia) Artem Markelov	BWT HWA Racelab	35	+10.552	11	
13	24	(Russia) Nikita Mazepin	Hitech Grand Prix	35	+10.661^{1}	9	
14	12	(Brazil) Pedro Piquet	Charouz Racing System	35	+14.389	17	
15	23	(Japan) Marino Sato	Trident Racing	35	+15.157	16	
16	10	(Brazil) Guilherme Samaia	Campos Racing	35	+15.327	22	
17	8	(India) Jehan Daruvala	Carlin	35	+18.437	12	
18^{2}	9	(United Kingdom) Jack Aitken	Campos Racing	34	Collision	7	
19^{2}	1	(Indonesia) Sean Gelael	DAMS	34	Collision	13	
DNF	22	(Israel) Roy Nissany	Trident Racing	30	Accident	15	
DNF	17	(France) Giuliano Alesi	BWT HWA Racelab	23	Collision	21	
DNF	5	(New Zealand) Marcus Armstrong	ART Grand Prix	0	Spun off	19	
Fastest lap： (Japan) Nobuharu Matsushita (MP Motorsport) − 1:32.902 (lap 35)

Note：

- ^1 – Nikita Mazepin originally finished in third place, but was given a five-second time penalty for failing to bypass the bollard at Turn 1, and finally ranked 13th.
- ^2 – Jack Aitken and Sean Gelael collided on the final lap, but were classified as they completed over 90% of the race distance.

=== Sprint race ===
Pos.	No.	Driver	Team	Laps	Time/Retired	Grid	Points
1	15	(Brazil) Felipe Drugovich	MP Motorsport	26	41:55.669	2	15
2	25	(Italy) Luca Ghiotto	Hitech Grand Prix	26	+9.536	1	12
3	20	(Germany) Mick Schumacher	Prema Racing	26	+10.956	3	10
4	7	(Japan) Yuki Tsunoda	Carlin	26	+14.924	5	8
5	14	(Japan) Nobuharu Matsushita	MP Motorsport	26	+19.921	8	6
6	24	(Russia) Nikita Mazepin	Hitech Grand Prix	26	+23.231	13	4
7	12	(Brazil) Pedro Piquet	Charouz Racing System	26	+24.528	14	2
8	4	(United Kingdom) Callum Ilott	UNI-Virtuosi Racing	26	+29.718	4	1
9	11	(Switzerland) Louis Delétraz	Charouz Racing System	26	+31.973	10	
10	2	(United Kingdom) Dan Ticktum	DAMS	26	+32.155	9	(2)
11	6	(Denmark) Christian Lundgaard	ART Grand Prix	26	+34.196^{3}	11	
12	22	(Israel) Roy Nissany	Trident Racing	26	+34.822	19	
13	21	(Russia) Robert Shwartzman	Prema Racing	26	+41.254	7	
14	3	(China) Guanyu Zhou	UNI-Virtuosi Racing	26	+41.996	6	
15	5	(New Zealand) Marcus Armstrong	ART Grand Prix	26	+43.413	21	
16	16	(Russia) Artem Markelov	BWT HWA Racelab	26	+45.618	12	
17	8	(India) Jehan Daruvala	Carlin	26	+46.219	17	
18	9	(United Kingdom) Jack Aitken	Campos Racing	26	+48.431	18	
19	17	(France) Giuliano Alesi	BWT HWA Racelab	26	+54.736	20	
20	10	(Brazil) Guilherme Samaia	Campos Racing	26	+1:09.082	16	
21	23	(Japan) Marino Sato	Trident Racing	26	+1:14.667	15	
DNS	1	(Indonesia) Sean Gelael	DAMS		Did not start^{4}		
Fastest lap： (United Kingdom) Dan Ticktum (DAMS) – 1:33.595 (lap 21)

Note：

- ^3 – Christian Lundgaard originally finished the race in eighth place, but because of an illegal overtake against Callum Ilott, he was given a five-second time penalty and finally ranked 11th.
- ^4 – Sean Gelael was declared unfit for the Sprint Race after an accident in the Feature Race with Jack Aitken, where he suffered a fracture of a vertebra. He was then subsequently ruled out for the following four rounds.

== Standings after the event ==
Drivers' Championship standings

	Pos.	Driver	Points
	1	(United Kingdom) Callum Ilott	121
1	2	(Russia) Robert Shwartzman	103
1	3	(Denmark) Christian Lundgaard	87
2	4	(Japan) Yuki Tsunoda	82
2	5	(Germany) Mick Schumacher	79

Teams' Championship standings

	Pos.	Team	Points
	1	(United Kingdom) UNI-Virtuosi Racing	197
	2	(Italy) Prema Racing	182
	3	(France) ART Grand Prix	121
	4	(United Kingdom) Hitech Grand Prix	118
1	5	(Netherlands) MP Motorsport	109

- Note: Only the top five positions are included for both sets of standings.

== See also ==
- 2020 Spanish Grand Prix
- 2020 Barcelona Formula 3 round

Previous round: 2020 2nd Silverstone Formula 2 round	FIA Formula 2 Championship; 2020 season	Next round: 2020 Spa-Francorchamps Formula 2 round
Previous round: 2019 Barcelona Formula 2 round	Barcelona Formula 2 round	Next round: 2022 Barcelona Formula 2 round
