= Jehan Daruvala =

Indian racing driver

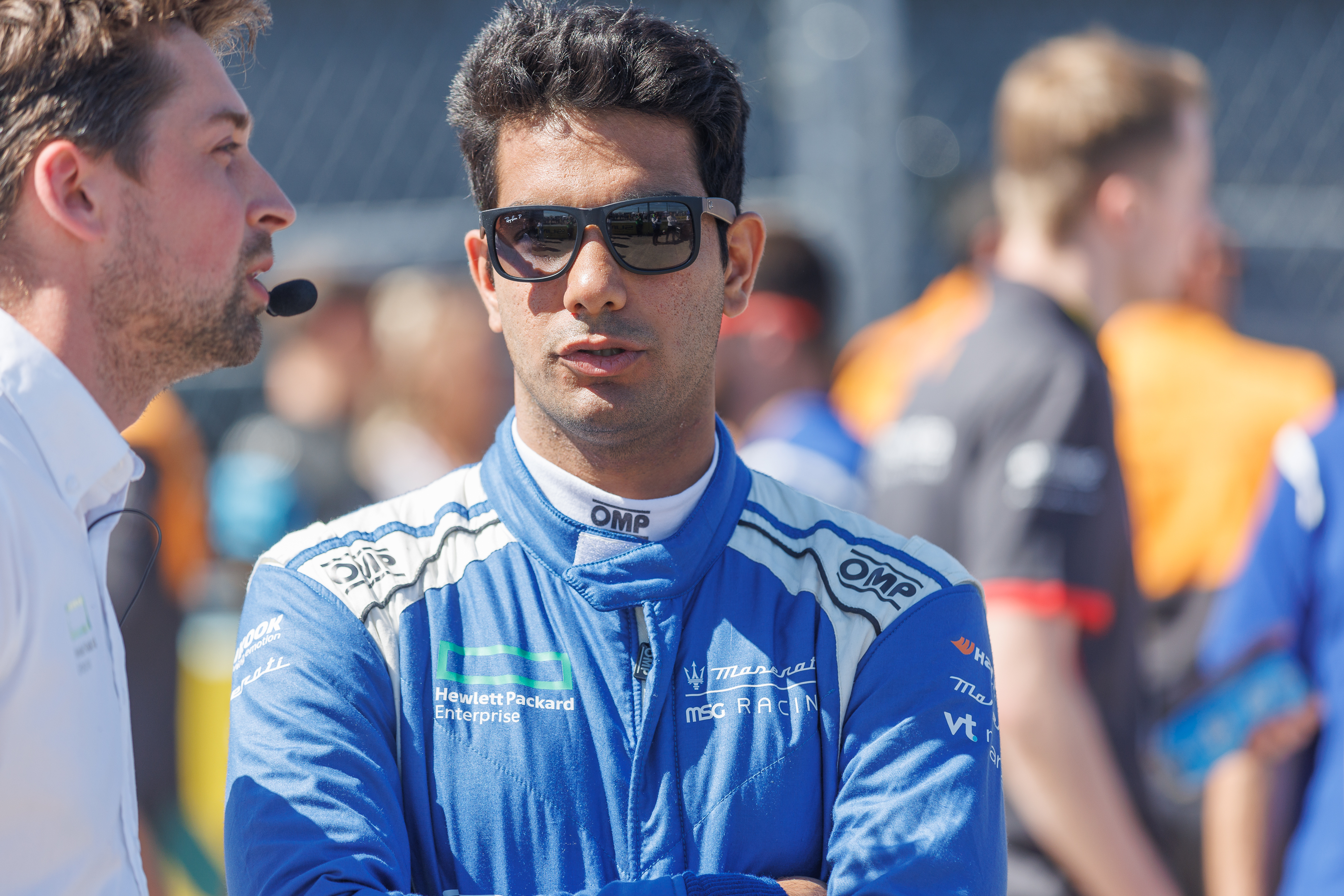
- Daruvala in 2024
- Nationality: (India) Indian
- Born: 1 October 1998 (age 28) Mumbai, Maharashtra, India

Formula E career
- Debut season: 2023–24
- Car number: 18
- Former teams: Maserati
- Starts: 16
- Wins: 0
- Podiums: 0
- Poles: 0
- Fastest laps: 0
- Best finish: 21st in 2023–24
- Finished last season: 21st (8 pts)

Previous series
- 2020–23 2021 2019 2018 2017–18 2016–17 2015–16 2015–16 2015: FIA Formula 2 Championship; F3 Asian Championship; FIA Formula 3 Championship; GP3 Series; FIA European F3; Toyota Racing Series; Eurocup Formula Renault 2.0; Formula Renault 2.0 NEC; Formula Renault 2.0 Alps

Championship titles
- 2016, 2017: Lady Wigram Trophy

Jehan Daruvala (Marathi pronunciation: [d͡ʒeˈɦɑn daːruːvaːlaː]; born 1 October 1998) is an Indian racing driver who last raced in the Formula E for Maserati MSG Racing. He was a protégé of the Force India F1 team, after being one of three winners of a 'One in a Billion hunt' organized by the team in 2011. He is also a former member of the Red Bull Junior Team.

== Early life ==
Daruvala was born in Mumbai to Khurshed and Kainaz Daruvala, a Parsi family. He studied at Bombay Scottish School, Mahim. His father Khurshed is the current chairman of Sterling & Wilson, an associate company of Shapoorji Pallonji.

== Junior racing career ==
=== Karting ===
Jehan Daruvala was born on 1 October 1998 in Mumbai, Maharashtra, India. He started karting in 2011 at the age of 13, competing in various championships across Asia and Europe. He won the Asia-Pacific Championship in 2012 and the Super 1 National Championship in 2013, while also finishing runner-up in multiple series. He further established his credentials by finishing third in the Karting World Championship in 2014. During his early career, Daruvala was coached by Rayomand Banajee, who played an instrumental role in developing his foundational skills.

=== Eurocup Formula Renault 2.0 ===
==== 2015 ====
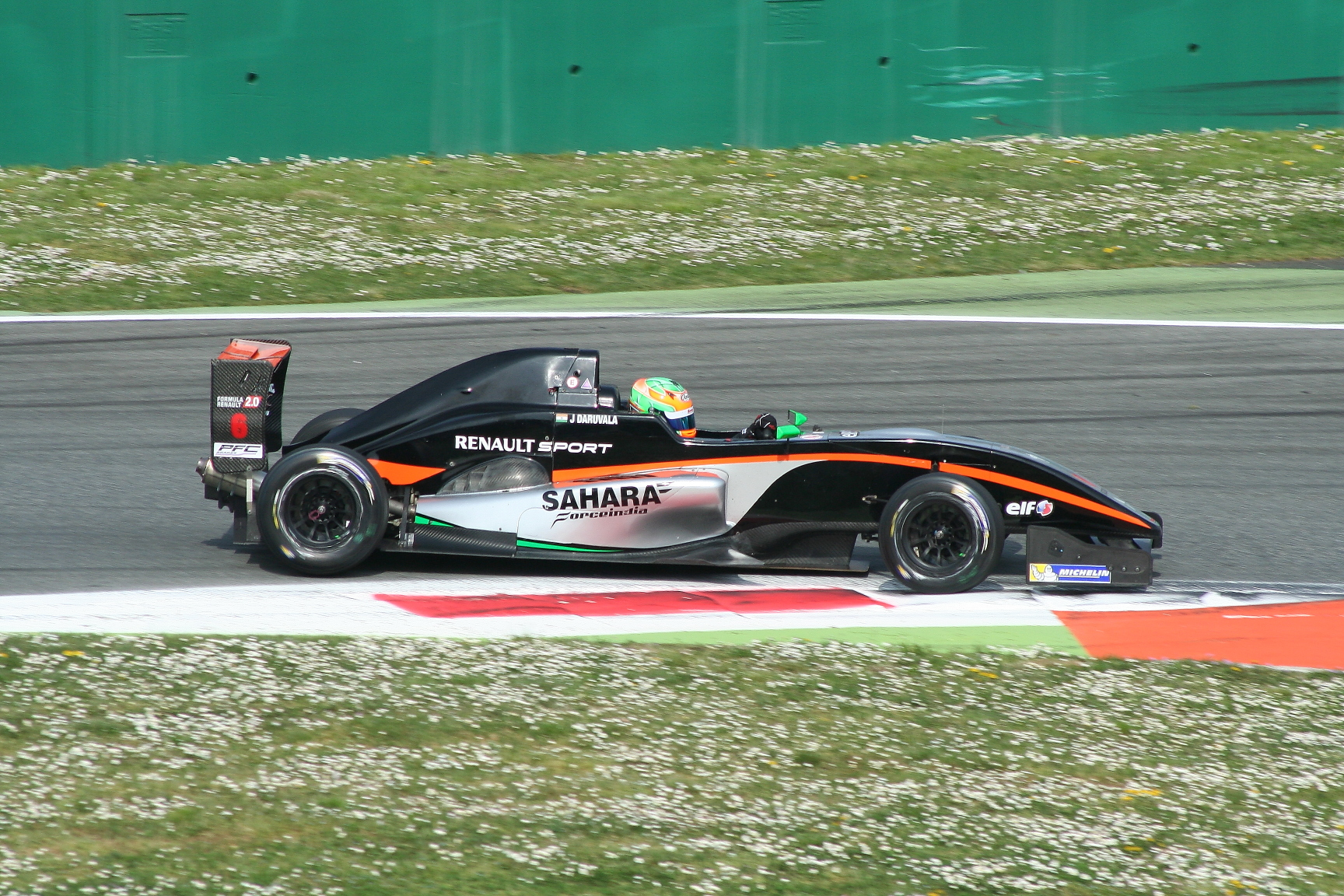
Daruvala racing at the 2015 Eurocup Formula Renault 2.0

Daruvala stepped up to single-seaters in 2015, joining Fortec Motorsport in the Formula Renault 2.0 championships. He achieved three podiums and consistent points-scoring results to place fifth in the Northern European Cup standings. In addition, he made appearances as a guest driver in both the Eurocup and Alps series.

==== 2016 ====
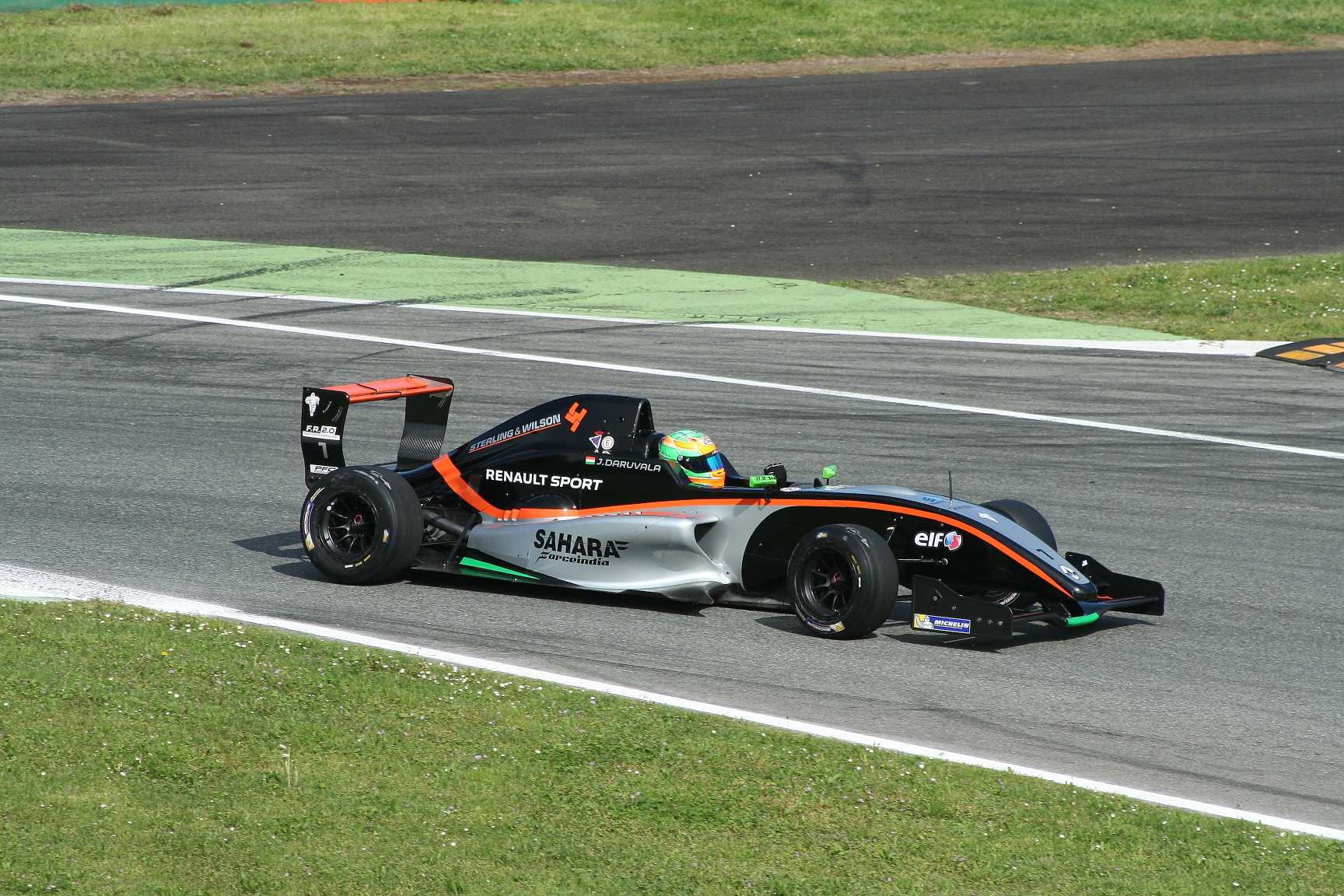
Daruvala racing in the 2016 Eurocup Formula Renault 2.0

For 2016, Daruvala switched to reigning champions Josef Kaufmann Racing, partnering Lando Norris and Robert Shwartzman. He secured pole position at the opening round in Monza, and managed a podium in the second race. He claimed his maiden Formula Renault win at the Hungaroring, going on to finish fourth in the Northern European Cup standings after collecting three more podiums.

In the Eurocup, Daruvala scored an early podium in Aragón but was unable to replicate that result consistently, ultimately finishing ninth in the standings.

=== Toyota Racing Series ===
Prior to his 2016 European campaign, Daruvala competed in the Toyota Racing Series. He claimed three victories and a further three podiums to finish runner-up in the championship behind Lando Norris.

He returned to the series in 2017, securing two wins–including the prestigious New Zealand Grand Prix–and recording the highest number of pole positions that season. Despite his strong qualifying form, a more competitive championship left him fifth in the overall championship.

=== Formula 3 (2017–2019) ===
==== 2017 ====
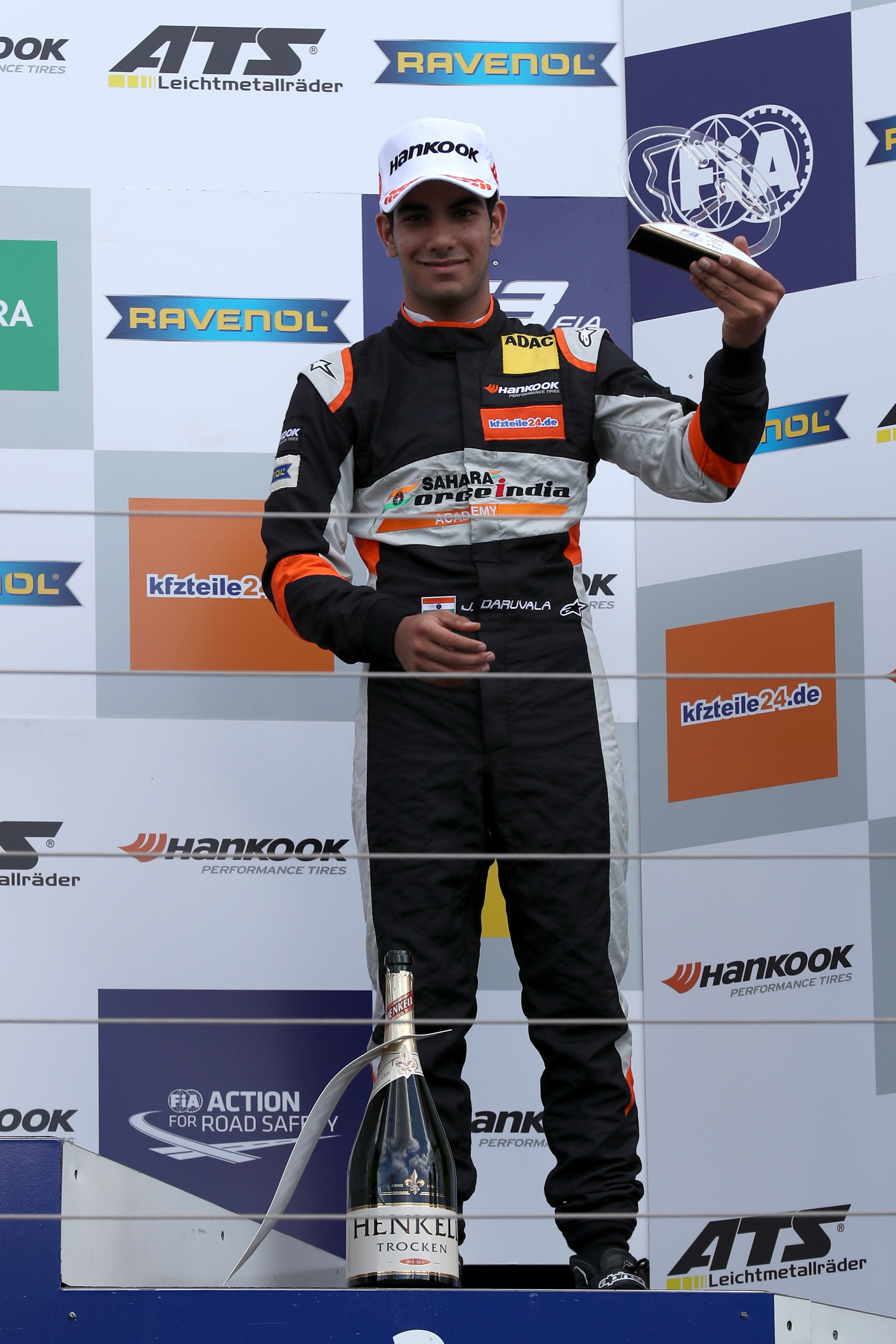
Daruvala on the podium at the Hungaroring in 2017

In November 2016, Daruvala announced his switch to the FIA Formula 3 European Championship for the 2017, joining Carlin the following month. He made an immediate impact in Monza, taking his maiden pole position and converting it into second place after leading much of the race. He added another podium at the Hungaroring before claiming his first victory at the Norisring, passing polesitter Maximilian Günther at the start. Daruvala finished sixth in the championship and also competed in the Macau Grand Prix, finishing tenth after starting 16th.

==== 2018 ====
Daruvala remained with Carlin for the 2018 season. He opened his campaign with a third-place at Pau and later secured his sole win of the year in Spa-Francorchamps, where he took pole position and fastest lap. Despite recording five podiums across the season, inconsistent results hindered his overall standing, and he finished tenth in the championship. He returned to the Macau Grand Prix, finishing twelfth from seventeenth.

Daruvala also made a one-off appearance in the Yas Marina GP3 finale, with MP Motorsport in place of Niko Kari, finishing nineteenth and thirteenth in the races.

==== 2019 ====
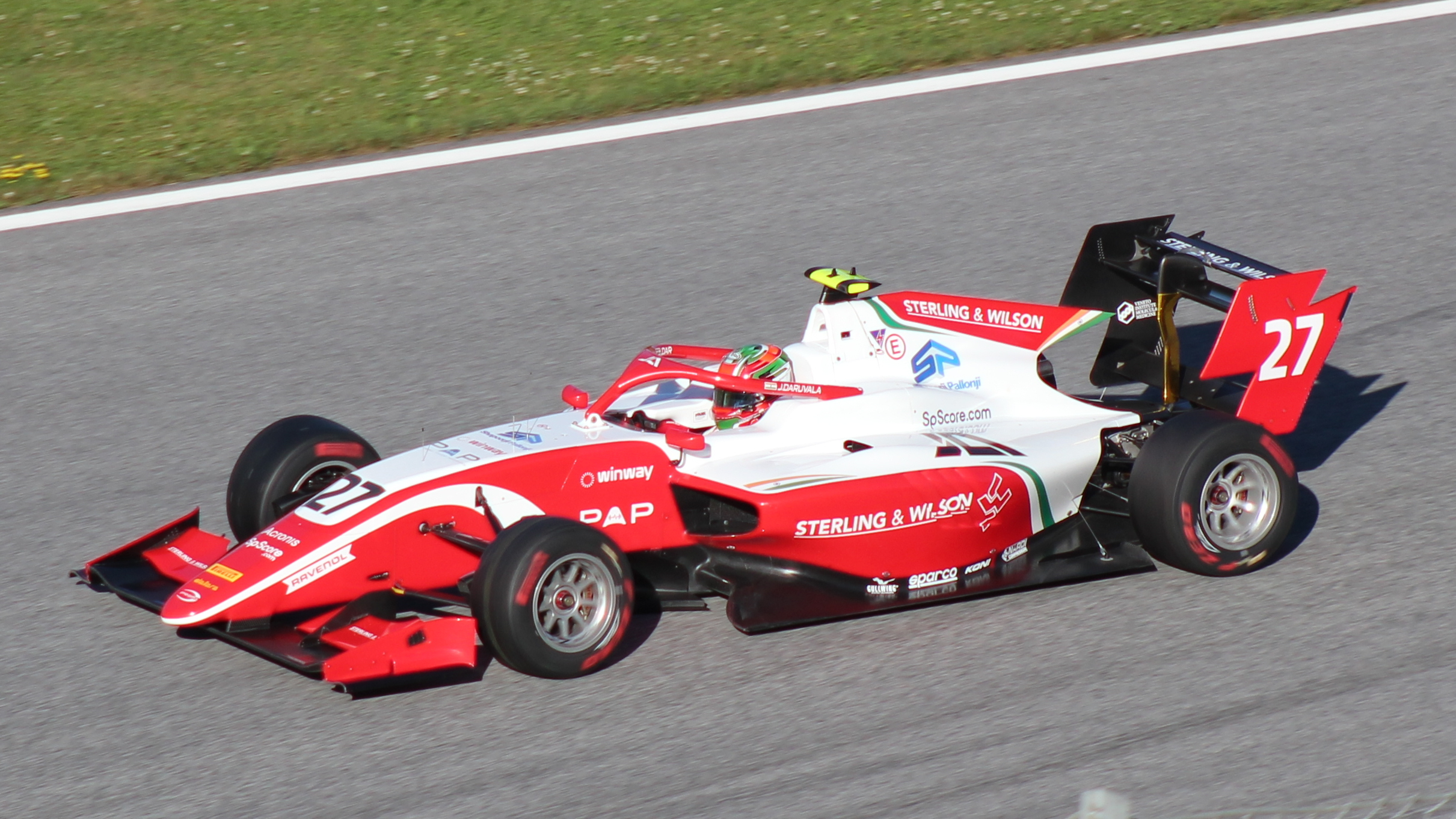
Daruvala at the 2019 Spielberg Formula 3 round.

In 2019, Daruvala continued in Formula 3 for a third consecutive year, competing in the inaugural FIA Formula 3 season with Prema Racing, partnering Robert Shwartzman and Marcus Armstrong. He enjoyed a strong start to the season, taking his maiden win in the Barcelona sprint race after overtaking Niko Kari at the start. He followed this with a second consecutive win in Paul Ricard, recovering from a slow launch from the front row to pass Jake Hughes for the lead. A third-place finish in the reverse-grid race capped off a run of three podiums in four races.

Daruvala remained competitive in the subsequent rounds, finishing fourth in the Red Bull Ring feature race, before inheriting second in the sprint race after his teammates collided ahead. In Silverstone, he secured another podium with second place in the feature race, though his momentum was interrupted in the reverse-grid race after a collision with Pedro Piquet eliminated both drivers. A difficult qualifying session in Daruvala had his worst qualifying of the year in Hungary left him outside the points for the first time that season. He regrouped in Spa-Francorchamps by claiming his maiden pole position. converting it into third place in the feature race, followed by fifth in the sprint.

In Monza, despite grid penalties for impeding, he recovered to finish third in the feature race. At the Sochi finale, Daruvala qualified on the front row but lost positions at the start, ultimately finishing fifth following a post-race penalty for another driver. He stalled on the formation lap of the sprint race and recovered to fourteenth. Daruvala concluded the season third in the championship, scoring seven podiums including two wins, along with one pole position and two fastest laps. Daruvala was scheduled to compete in the Macau Grand Prix but withdrew due to injury, with Frederik Vesti replacing him.

=== FIA Formula 2 Championship ===
==== 2020 ====
In February 2020, Daruvala rejoined Carlin for the FIA Formula 2 Championship, partnering Red Bull Junior Yuki Tsunoda. He was simultaneously inducted into the Red Bull Junior Team, with aspirations of progressing to Formula One in 2021. Following a delayed start to the season, Daruvala made his debut at the Red Bull Ring, qualifying sixth. However, a poor start and a collision with Tsunoda dropped him out of contention in the feature race, and he finished thirteenth, before placing sixteenth in the sprint. Daruvala's hope of points were over following a poor start, before being tipped into a spin by Tsunoda. A similarly challenging round at the same circuit saw him qualify seventh but slip to twelfth in the feature race, while he narrowly missed out on points in the sprint.

Daruvala's breakthrough came in Hungaroring, where he qualified sixteenth but executed an alternate strategy in the feature race, climbing through the field to finish sixth and score his maiden Formula 2 points. He followed this with another sixth-place finish in the sprint race, marking his first double points finish. In Silverstone, he continued to qualify consistently inside the top ten, though race starts hindered his results; he recovered to fifth in the sprint race after pitting under the safety car. A more difficult second Silverstone round and a non-scoring weekend in Barcelona stalled his momentum. A string of challenging rounds followed. In Spa-Francorchamps, early contact in the feature forced him into an unscheduled pit stop, resulting in a nineteenth-place finish. He returned to the points in Monza, utilising an alternate strategy to finish tenth in the feature race, before placing sixth in the sprint. In Mugello, another slow start compromised his feature race, though he again salvaged points with sixth in the sprint.

Daruvala achieved his strongest qualifying performance of the season in Sochi, lining up second alongside Tsunoda on the front row. He then finished fifth in the feature race but dropped out of the points in the sprint following a time penalty. In Bahrain, he converted a strong start into contention and, after an effective undercut strategy, secured his maiden podium with third place in the feature race. However, his sprint race ended prematurely following contact with Callum Ilott. During the second Bahrain round, Daruvala qualified third and finished seventh in the feature race. In the sprint, Daruvala overtook Dan Ticktum late on to secure his maiden Formula 2 victory. He concluded the season twelfth in the drivers' standings with 72 points, significantly behind Tsunoda, who finished third and was promoted to Formula One.

==== 2021 ====
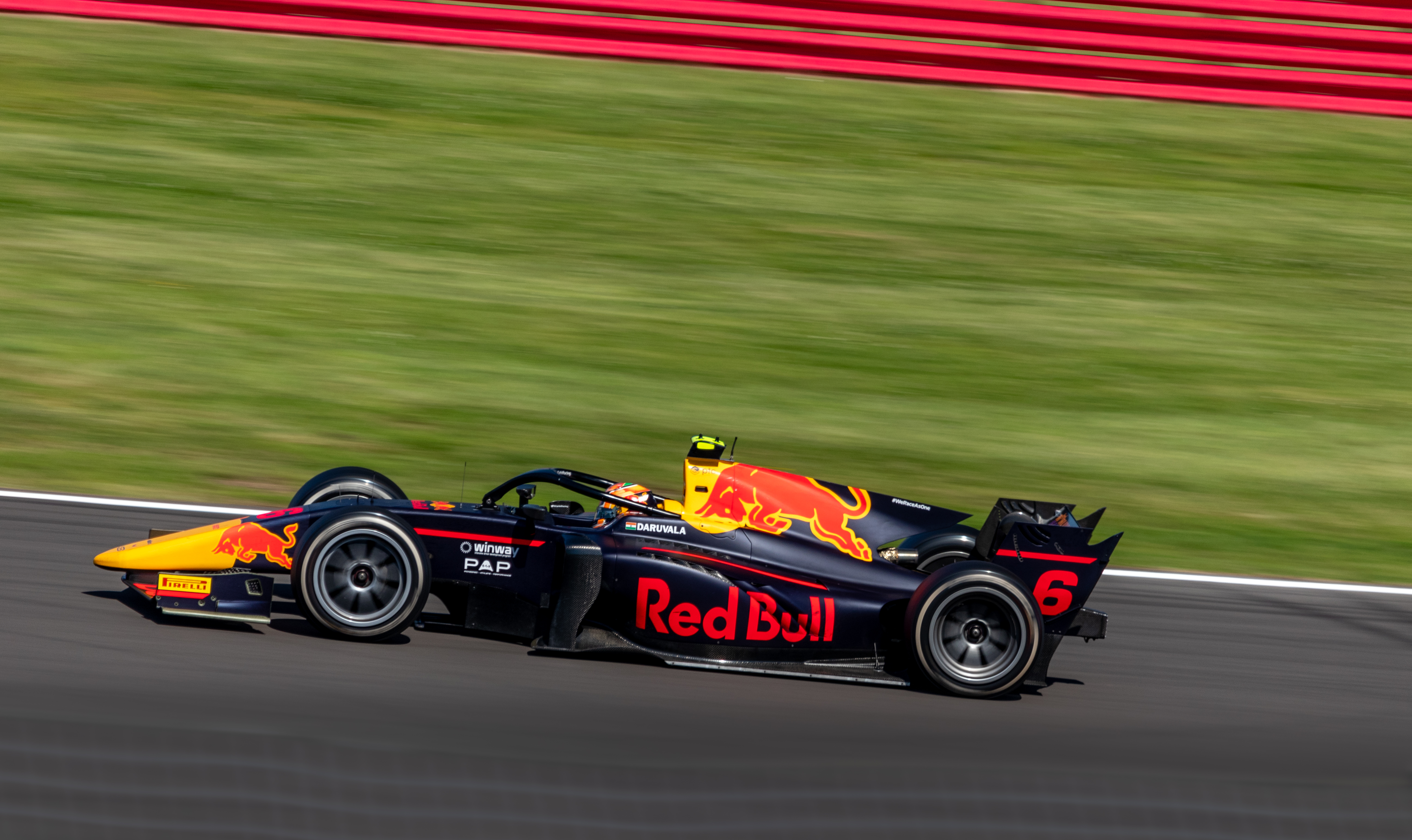
Daruvala driving for Carlin during the 2021 Silverstone Formula 2 round

Prior to his main campaign, Daruvala competed in the F3 Asian Championship with Mumbai Falcons, where he secured three victories and eight podiums to finish third in the championship behind Pierre-Louis Chovet and champion Guanyu Zhou.

Daruvala continued in the FIA Formula 2 Championship for 2021 with Carlin alongside Dan Ticktum. He began the season strongly in Bahrain, finishing second in the opening after passing David Beckmann and capitalising on Théo Pourchaire's retirement, though he was unable to challenge race winner Liam Lawson. He added a fourth place in the second sprint and sixth in the feature race. A difficult weekend followed in Monaco. Daruvala narrowly missed out on reverse pole for the second sprint after being overtaken on the final lap of the opening race, and despite being promoted into the points in the second sprint following a disqualification ahead, he retired from the feature race after contact with Gianluca Petecof.

In Baku, Daruvala returned to form with a podium in the second sprint race, overtaking Bent Viscaal after a safety car restart to finish third, having finished fourth in the earlier sprint. He added further points in the feature race. However, his momentum stalled at Silverstone, where contact with Viscaal in the second sprint resulted in a time penalty, and he could only manage tenth in the feature race. Daruvala delivered a breakthrough performance in Monza, qualifying on the front row. After placing outside the points in the opening sprint, he started second in the reverse-grid race and took the lead at the start, controlling the race to secure his first victory of the season. He followed this with a fifth-place finish in the feature race, despite a poor start. In Sochi, he again qualified second. After a spin in the sprint race dropped him out of the points, he recovered to finish third in the feature race.

In Jeddah, Daruvala qualified outside the top ten and endured a difficult weekend, where penalties in both sprint races dropping him out of contention and leaving him without points. This included a penalty in the second sprint for an off-track pass on Oscar Piastri, which demoted him from second place. He rebounded at the Yas Marina finale, starting from reverse pole in the opening sprint and converting it into his second victory of the season after holding off sustained pressure from Felipe Drugovich. He added a further fifth-place finish in the second sprint, while he failed to score points in the feature race. Daruvala finished seventh in the standings championship with 113 points, scoring two victories, five podiums and a fastest lap, though he was outscored by teammate Ticktum.

==== 2022 ====
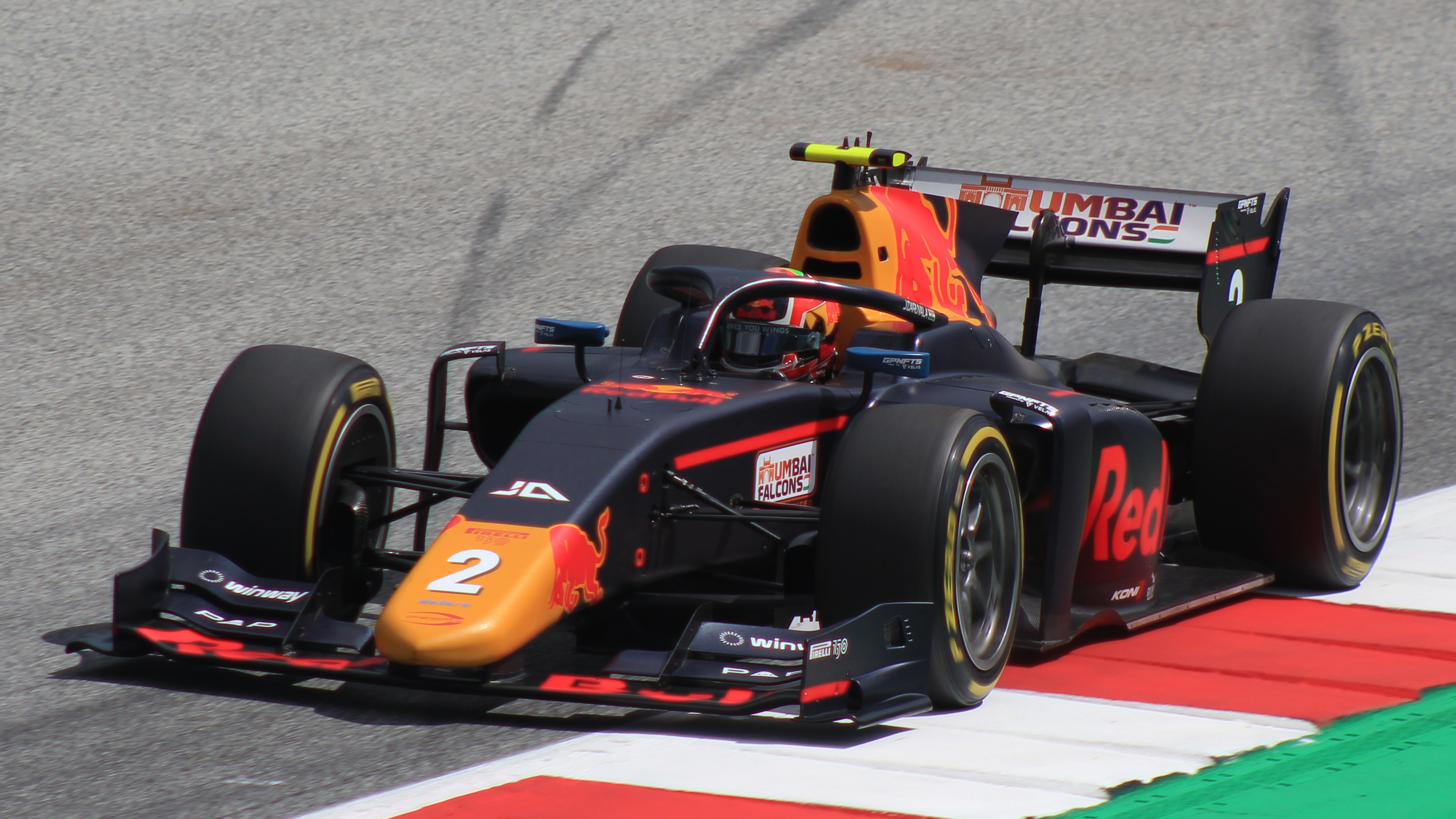
Daruvala driving the Dallara F2 2018 during the 2022 Spielberg Formula 2 round.

In January 2022, Daruvala reunited with reigning champions Prema Powerteam for the 2022 season, partnering fellow Red Bull Junior Team member and 2021 FIA Formula 3 champion Dennis Hauger. Although initially expected to be his final season in the category, Daruvala would ultimately remain for another year. Daruvala qualified seventh at the season-opening Bahrain round and finished second in the sprint race after passing Ralph Boschung in the closing stages. His feature race was compromised by contact and a front wing change, dropping him to fourteenth. In Jeddah, he recovered from a lowly qualifying position to finish seventh in the sprint following post-race penalties, while an early pit stop allowed him to gain track position and secure third in the feature race.

He qualified eighth in Imola and finished second in the sprint race behind Marcus Armstrong, but an alternate strategy in the feature proved ineffective due to an early safety car, which left him ninth. In Barcelona, he qualified fourth and finished in the same position after a late overtake on Jake Hughes. In the feature race, he retired with an electrical issue while again attempting a strategy offset. In Monaco, Daruvala secured second in the sprint behind Hauger, completing a 1-2 finish for Prema, while he finished eighth in an uneventful feature race. In Baku, he led the majority of the race after passing Frederik Vesti at the start, but a lock-up after the second safety car restart dropped him to second place behind Vesti; he added a fourth place in a chaotic feature race.

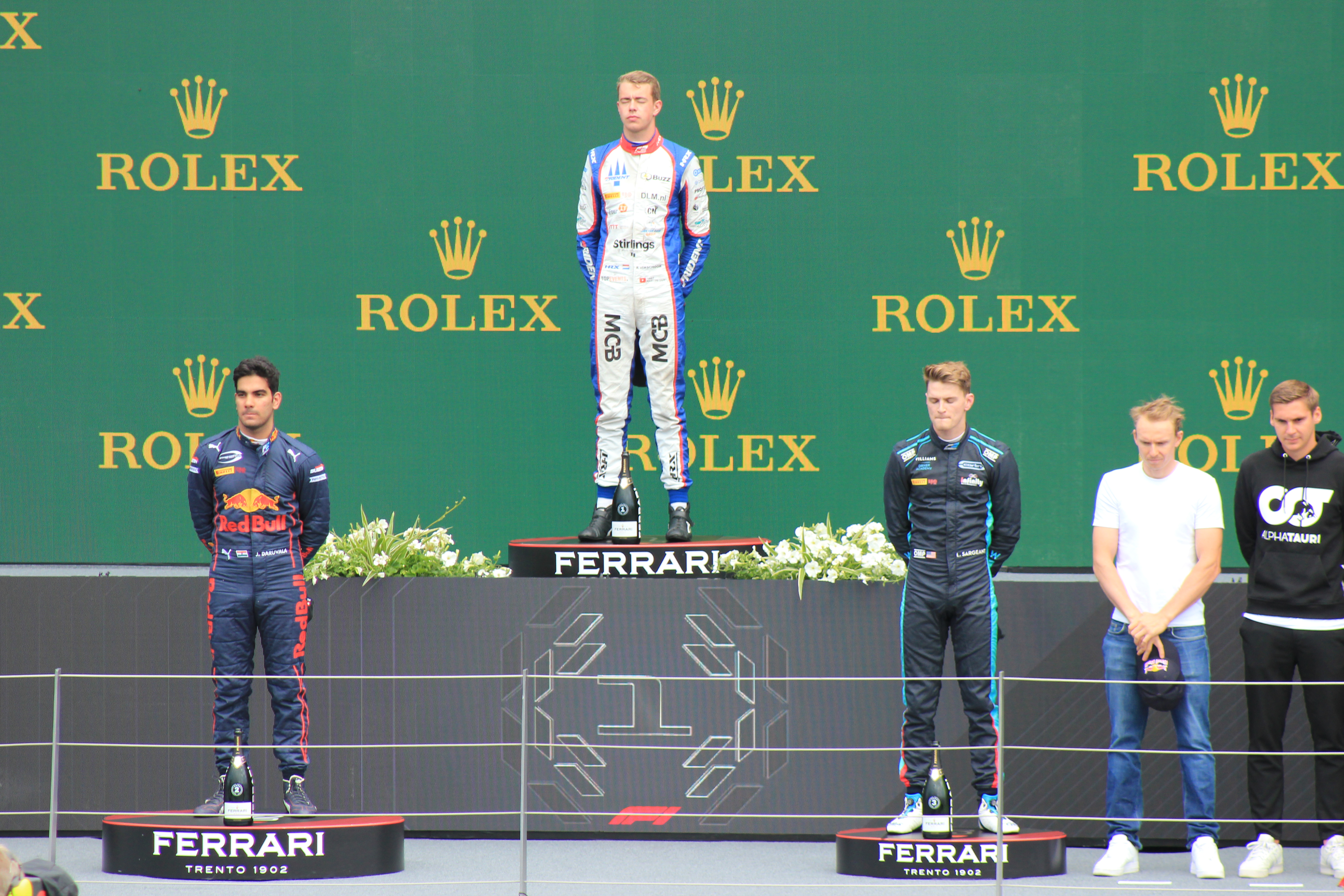
Daruvala (left) taking 2nd in the Austria feature race before being penalised

Daruvala's mid-season form proved inconsistent. After qualifying on reverse pole at Silverstone, he dropped to eighth in the sprint due to tyre degradation but recovered to sixth in the feature race on an alternate strategy. In Austria, he initially finished second on a drying track after starting on slick tyres, but a post-race track drying penalty dropped him out of the points; the result cost him a potential victory after race winner Richard Verschoor was later disqualified. In France, Daruvala claimed another sprint race podium after leading early before being passed by Liam Lawson, and finished seventh in the feature. However, a difficult run followed across the next rounds, which included a non-scoring weekend in Hungary and a did not start (DNS) in the Spa-Francorchamps sprint due to a technical issue; he was due to start from second from the latter.

A crash in Zandvoort limited Daruvala to seventeenth in qualifying, though he broke his points drought with a tenth place in the feature race, following a post-race penalty for David Beckmann ahead. His breakthrough came in Monza, where he qualified sixth and finished third in the sprint. In the feature race, despite minor contact with Jack Doohan and Logan Sargeant on the opening lap, a well-timed safety car allowed Daruvala to benefit and inherit the lead, which he converted into his maiden Formula 2 feature race victory. Despite the breakthrough, Daruvala ended the season on a subdued note. In Abu Dhabi, he qualified twelfth and retired from the sprint race following a collision with Enzo Fittipaldi; he finished thirteenth in the feature. Daruvala concluded the season seventh in the championship with 126 points, recording one victory and seven additional podiums.

==== 2023 ====
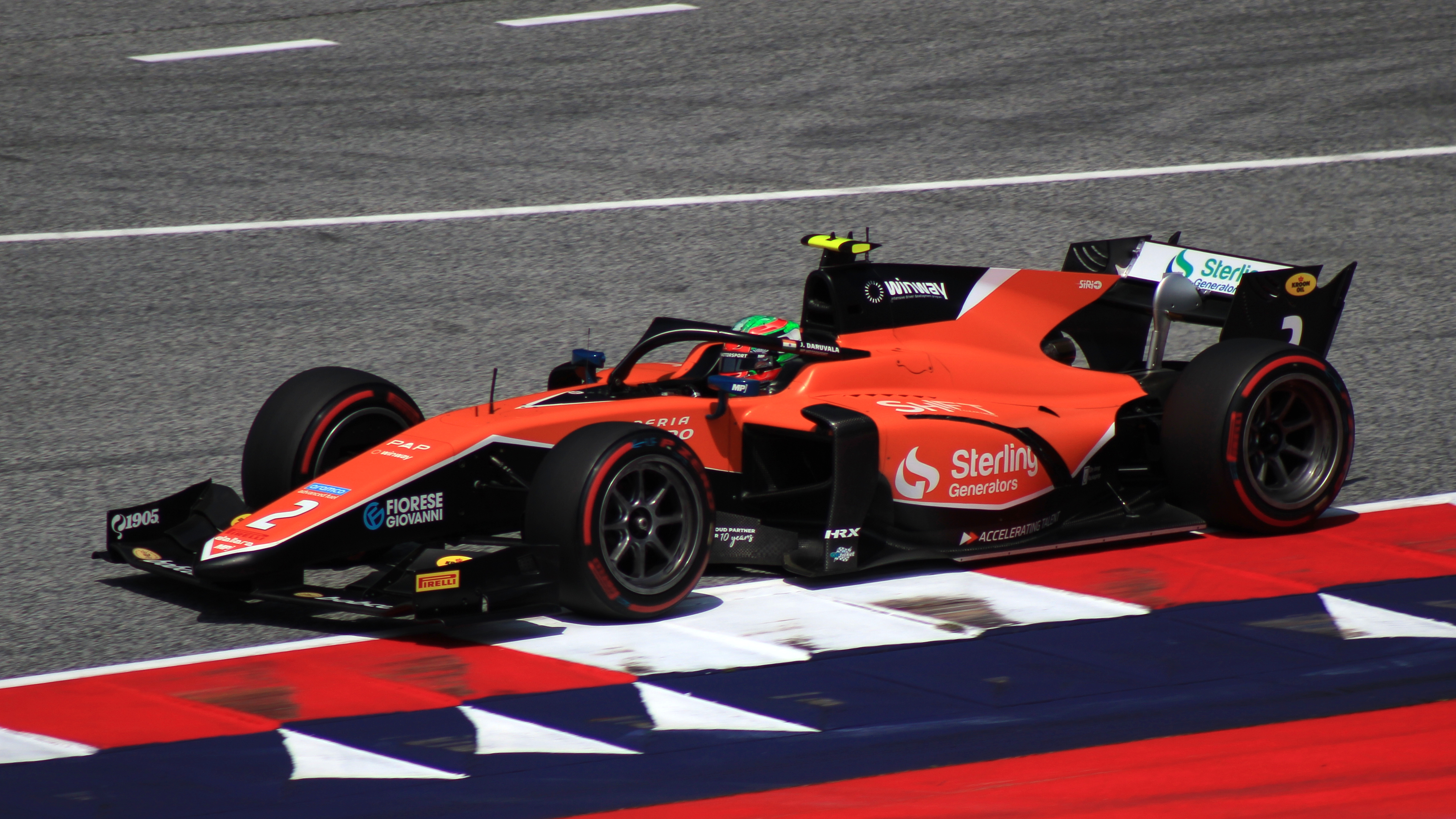
Daruvala driving for MP Motorsport during the 2023 Silverstone Formula 2 round

In 2023, Daruvala switched to reigning champions MP Motorsport for his fourth season in Formula 2, continuing alongside Dennis Hauger. Ahead of the campaign, Daruvala indicated that his long-term future lay in Formula E. Daruvala qualified eleventh in the Bahrain season opener and finished sixth in the sprint race after a strong start, but tyre degradation compromised his feature race, leaving him sixteenth. In Jeddah, he converted a strong fifth-place qualifying result into a pair of podiums, finishing third in both races. He added sixth in a disrupted Melbourne feature race, though a disappointing weekend in Baku followed; he retired from fifth in the sprint after collecting Victor Martins' car and later fell out of the points in the feature due to a penalty for rejoining unsafely.

In Monaco, Daruvala secured second in the sprint race after inheriting the position when Isack Hadjar encountered mechanical issues, but he finished outside the points in the feature. A non-scoring weekend in Barcelona followed, before he returned to the points with tenth and sixth-places in the Austria and Silverstone feature races respectively. In Hungary, he added a fifth place in the sprint. His inconsistent form persisted into the latter stages of the season. In Spa-Francorchamps, Daruvala started from reverse pole in the sprint but retired early due to a loose headrest, before a second retirement in the feature marked his first double DNF weekend in Formula 2. In Zandvoort, he qualified sixteenth and finished outside the points in both races, while he recovered to seventh place in the Monza feature race on an alternate strategy.

Daruvala did not contest the season finale in Abu Dhabi after signing with Maserati MSG Racing in the FIA Formula E World Championship; he was replaced by Franco Colapinto. He finished twelfth in the standings with three podiums and 59 points, marking his first full Formula 2 season without a race victory.

== Formula One ==
Daruvala was announced as member of the Red Bull Junior Team, prior to driving in the 2020 Formula 2 Championship.

On the weekend after the 2022 Canadian Grand Prix, Daruvala was announced to have his first taste of a Formula One car with McLaren, testing the McLaren MCL35M at the Silverstone Circuit. He also had another test at the Algarve International Circuit, from July 18–19. A third F1 test came during the end of September, where he drove at the Circuit Paul Ricard.

At the start of 2023, it was confirmed that Daruvala had been released from the Red Bull Junior Team roster after three years.

== Formula E ==
At the end of November 2022, Daruvala was announced as a test and reserve driver for Mahindra Racing for the 2022-23 Formula E season. He made his first appearance in Formula E machinery during the Berlin rookie test in April 2023, before debuting in a free practice session at the Rome ePrix later that year.

=== Maserati MSG Racing (2024) ===
==== 2023–24 season ====
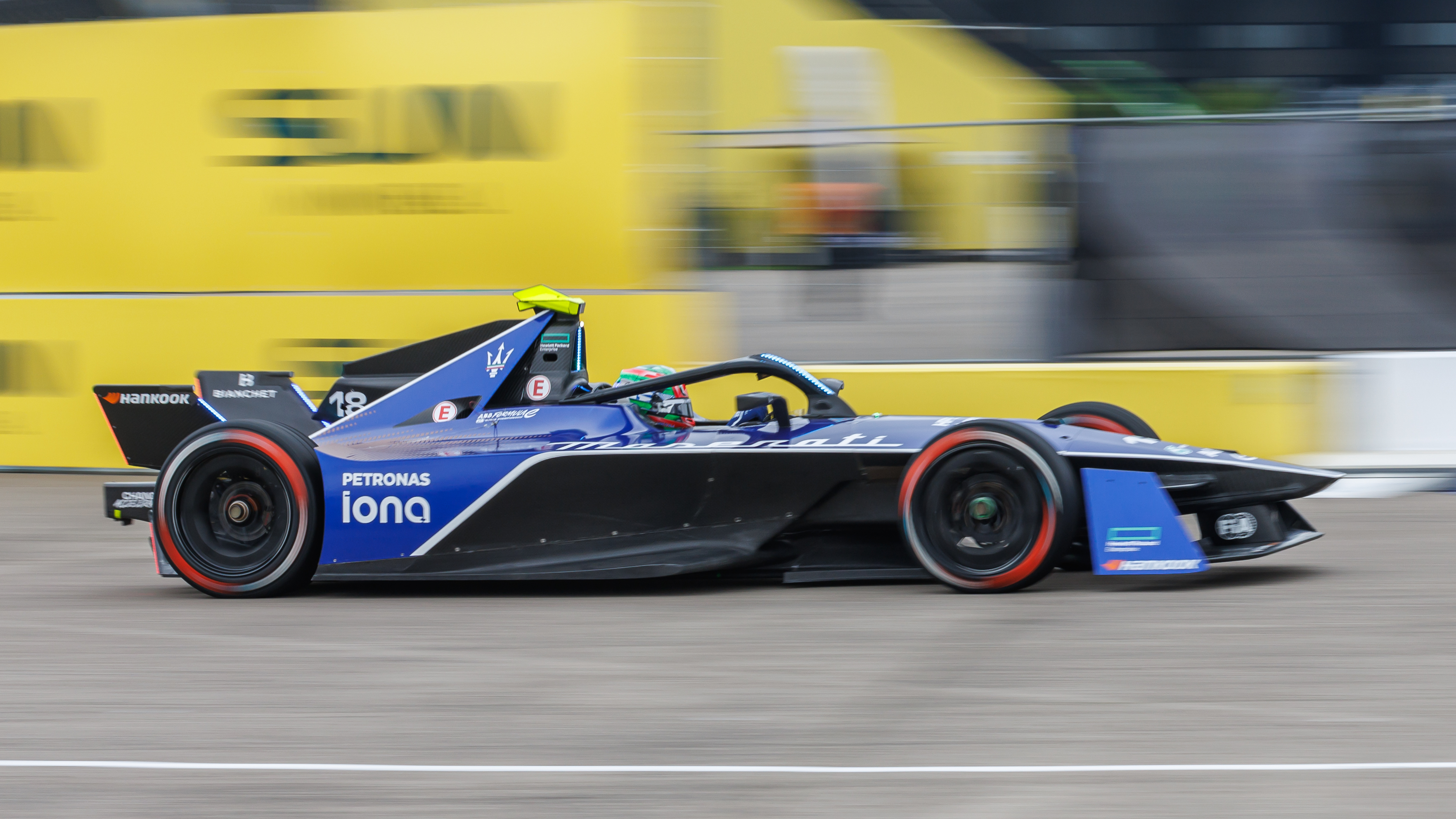
Daruvala with Maserati MSG Racing at the 2024 Berlin ePrix

On 27 September 2023, Daruvala signed with Maserati MSG Racing for the 2023–24 Formula E season, teaming up with Maximilian Günther. He finished his debut race in Mexico City in sixteenth place, before reaching the Duels stage of qualifying for the first time in Diriyah, where he qualified fifth, but retired from the race due to a technical issue. Daruvala scored his first points at the Misano ePrix with ninth place, aided by an effective energy management strategy. He was in contention for more points in Monaco, but difficulties deploying Attack Mode dropped him to twentieth at the finish. He later recorded a career-best result of seventh at the Berlin ePrix marking his second and final points finish of the season.

Daruvala concluded his rookie campaign 21st in the standings with eight points, significantly behind Günther. Following the season, he departed both Maserati and the championship. In March 2025, Daruvala announced that he would not compete in any racing series for the year.

== Karting record ==
=== Karting career summary ===
Season	Series	Team	Position
2011	All Stars Karting Championship Malaysia — Yamaha Junior		1st
2011	Asian Karting Open Championship - Formula 125 Junior Open		34th
2011	CIK-FIA Academy Trophy	Daruvala, Khurshed	25th
2012	Copa Campeones Trophy — KF3		6th
2012	WSK Master Series — KF3	Ricky Flynn Motorsport	40th
2012	WSK Euro Series — KF3	Ricky Flynn Motorsport	29th
2012	CIK-FIA World Cup — KF3	Ricky Flynn Motorsport	17th
2012	Asia-Pacific Championship — KF3	Rayo Racing	1st
2013	South Garda Winter Cup — KF3		11th
2013	Andrea Margutti Trophy — KFJ	Ricky Flynn Motorsport	4th
2013	WSK Euro Series — KFJ	Ricky Flynn Motorsport	17th
2013	WSK Super Master Series — KFJ	Ricky Flynn Motorsport	12th
2013	Super 1 National Championship — KFJ		1st
2013	CIK-FIA International Super Cup — KFJ	Ricky Flynn Motorsport	2nd
2013	CIK-FIA European Championship — KFJ	Ricky Flynn Motorsport	8th
2013	CIK-FIA World Championship — KFJ	Ricky Flynn Motorsport	15th
2013	WSK Final Cup — KFJ	Ricky Flynn Motorsport	21st
2014	South Garda Winter Cup — KF2	Ricky Flynn Motorsport	9th
2014	Andrea Margutti Trophy — KF	Ricky Flynn Motorsport	11th
2014	WSK Super Master Series — KF	Ricky Flynn Motorsport	6th
2014	German Karting Championship — Senior	Ricky Flynn Motorsport	2nd
2014	Deutsche Schalt Kart Meisterschaft	Ricky Flynn Motorsport	NC
2014	CIK-FIA European Championship — KFJ	Ricky Flynn Motorsport	14th
2014	CIK-FIA World Championship — KFJ	Ricky Flynn Motorsport	3rd
2014	SKUSA SuperNationals — TaG Senior	Ricky Flynn Motorsport	NC

== Racing record ==
=== Racing career summary ===
Season	Series	Team	Races	Wins	Poles	F/Laps	Podiums	Points	Position
2015	Formula Renault 2.0 NEC	Fortec Motorsport	16	0	0	1	3	194.5	5th
2015	Formula Renault 2.0 Alps	Fortec Motorsport	7	0	1	0	2	0	NC†
2015	Eurocup Formula Renault 2.0	Fortec Motorsport	7	0	0	0	0	0	NC†
2016	Eurocup Formula Renault 2.0	Josef Kaufmann Racing	15	0	1	0	1	62	9th
2016	Formula Renault 2.0 NEC	Josef Kaufmann Racing	15	1	1	1	5	223	4th
2016	Toyota Racing Series	M2 Competition	15	3	1	3	6	789	**2nd**
2017	FIA Formula 3 European Championship	Carlin	30	1	1	0	3	191	6th
2017	Macau Grand Prix	Carlin	1	0	0	0	0	N/A	10th
2017	Toyota Racing Series	M2 Competition	15	2	5	2	9	781	5th
2018	FIA Formula 3 European Championship	Carlin	30	1	1	1	5	136.5	10th
2018	Macau Grand Prix	Carlin	1	0	0	0	0	N/A	12th
2018	GP3 Series	MP Motorsport	2	0	0	0	0	0	26th
2019	FIA Formula 3 Championship	Prema Racing	16	2	1	2	7	157	**3rd**
2020	FIA Formula 2 Championship	Carlin	24	1	0	1	2	72	12th
2021	FIA Formula 2 Championship	Carlin	23	2	0	1	5	113	7th
2021	F3 Asian Championship	Mumbai Falcons India Racing Ltd.	15	3	3	3	8	192	**3rd**
2022	FIA Formula 2 Championship	Prema Racing	27	1	0	2	8	126	7th
2022–23	Formula E	Mahindra Racing	Reserve driver						
2023	FIA Formula 2 Championship	MP Motorsport	24	0	0	0	3	59	12th
2023–24	Formula E	Maserati MSG Racing	16	0	0	1	0	8	21st

^{†} As Daruvala was a guest driver, he was ineligible for points.

=== Complete Formula Renault 2.0 Northern European Cup results ===
(key) (Races in bold indicate pole position) (Races in italics indicate fastest lap)

Year	Team	1	2	3	4	5	6	7	8	9	10	11	12	13	14	15	16	DC	Points
2015	Fortec Motorsports	MNZ; 1; 8	MNZ; 2; 4	SIL; 1; 16	SIL; 2; 15	RBR; 1; 3	RBR; 2; 4	RBR; 3 Ret	SPA; 1; 6	SPA; 2; 6	ASS; 1; 11	ASS; 2; 7	NÜR; 1; 5	NÜR; 2; 2	HOC; 1; 3	HOC; 2 Ret	HOC; 3; 11	5th	194.5
2016	Josef Kaufmann Racing	**MNZ**; **1**; 4	MNZ; 2; 2	SIL; 1; 5	SIL; 2; 4	HUN; 1; 13	HUN; 2; 1	SPA; 1; 7	SPA; 2 Ret	ASS; 1; 3	ASS; 2; 3	NÜR; 1; 4	NÜR; 2; 3	HOC; 1 Ret	HOC; 2; 13	HOC; 3; 9		4th	223

=== Complete Formula Renault 2.0 Alps results ===
(key) (Races in bold indicate pole position) (Races in italics indicate fastest lap)

Year	Team	1	2	3	4	5	6	7	8	9	10	11	12	13	14	15	16	Pos	Points
2015	Fortec Motorsport	IMO; 1	IMO; 2	PAU; 1	PAU; 2	RBR; 1	RBR; 2	RBR; 3	SPA; 1	SPA; 2	MNZ; 1; 6	MNZ; 2; 8	MNZ; 3 Ret	**MIS**; **1**; 3	**MIS**; **2**; 4	JER; 1; 6	JER; 2; 8	NC†	0

^{†} As Daruvala was a guest driver, he was ineligible for points.

=== Complete Eurocup Formula Renault 2.0 results ===
(key) (Races in bold indicate pole position) (Races in italics indicate fastest lap)

Year	Team	1	2	3	4	5	6	7	8	9	10	11	12	13	14	15	16	17	Pos	Points
2015	Fortec Motorsport	ALC; 1	ALC; 2	ALC; 3	SPA; 1	SPA; 2	HUN; 1	HUN; 2	SIL; 1 Ret	SIL; 2 DNS	SIL; 3; 16	NÜR; 1; 7	NÜR; 2 Ret	LMS; 1	LMS; 2	JER; 1; 15	JER; 2; 13	JER; 3 Ret	NC†	0
2016	Josef Kaufmann Racing	ALC; 1; 3	ALC; 2; 5	ALC; 3; 13	MON; 1; 15	MNZ; 1; 7	MNZ; 2 Ret	MNZ; 3 Ret	RBR; 1; 5	RBR; 2; 7	LEC; 1 Ret	LEC; 2; 7	SPA; 1; 9	SPA; 2 Ret	EST; 1; 10	EST; 2; 11			9th	62

^{†} As Daruvala was a guest driver, he was ineligible for points.

=== Complete Toyota Racing Series results ===
(key) (Races in bold indicate pole position) (Races in italics indicate fastest lap)

Year	Team	1	2	3	4	5	6	7	8	9	10	11	12	13	14	15	DC	Points
2016	M2 Competition	RUA; 1; 8	RUA; 2; 13	RUA; 3; 1	TER; 1; 1	TER; 2; 5	TER; 3; 17	HMP; 1; 2	HMP; 2; 4	HMP; 3; 3	TAU; 1; 5	TAU; 2; 1	TAU; 3; 8	**MAU**; **1**; 4	MAU; 2; 2	MAU; 3; 7	2nd	789
2017	M2 Competition	**RUA**; **1**; 2	RUA; 2 Ret	**RUA**; **3**; 1	TER; 1; 9	TER; 2; 7	TER; 3; 2	HMP; 1; 14	HMP; 2; 8	HMP; 3; 3	TAU; 1; 3	TAU; 2; 3	**TAU**; **3**; 2	**MAN**; **1**; 2	MAN; 2; 7	**MAN**; **3**; 1	5th	781

=== Complete FIA Formula 3 European Championship results ===
(key) (Races in bold indicate pole position) (Races in italics indicate fastest lap)

Year	Entrant	Engine	1	2	3	4	5	6	7	8	9	10	11	12	13	14	15	16	17	18	19	20	21	22	23	24	25	26	27	28	29	30	DC	Points
2017	Carlin	Volkswagen	SIL; 1; 10	SIL; 2; 8	SIL; 3; 6	**MNZ**; **1**; 2	MNZ; 2; 8	MNZ; 3; 9	PAU; 1; 10	PAU; 2; 9	PAU; 3; 11	HUN; 1; 3	HUN; 2; 8	HUN; 3; 9	NOR; 1; 6	NOR; 2; 4	NOR; 3; 1	SPA; 1; 4	SPA; 2; 5	SPA; 3; 5	ZAN; 1; 9	ZAN; 2; 16	ZAN; 3; 14	NÜR; 1; 6	NÜR; 2; 10	NÜR; 3; 5	RBR; 1; 13	RBR; 2; 5	RBR; 3; 6	HOC; 1; 5	HOC; 2; 8	HOC; 3; 20	6th	191
2018	Carlin	Volkswagen	PAU; 1 Ret	PAU; 2; 6	PAU; 3; 3‡	HUN; 1; 13	HUN; 2; 6	HUN; 3; 11	NOR; 1; 3	NOR; 2; 6	NOR; 3; 5	ZAN; 1; 12	ZAN; 2 Ret	ZAN; 3; 3	**SPA**; **1**; 1	SPA; 2; 3	SPA; 3; 11	SIL; 1; 9	SIL; 2; 15	SIL; 3; 12	MIS; 1; 9	MIS; 2 Ret	MIS; 3; 9	NÜR; 1 Ret	NÜR; 2; 13	NÜR; 3; 14	RBR; 1; 10	RBR; 2; 18†	RBR; 3; 7	HOC; 1 Ret	HOC; 2; 4	HOC; 3 Ret	10th	136.5

^{†} Driver did not finish the race, but was classified as he completed over 90% of the race distance.
^{‡} Half points awarded as less than 75% of race distance was completed.

=== Complete Macau Grand Prix results ===
Year	Team	Car	Qualifying	Quali Race	Main race
2017	(United Kingdom) Carlin	Dallara F317	19th	16th	10th
2018	(United Kingdom) Carlin	Dallara F317	19th	17th	12th

=== Complete GP3 Series/FIA Formula 3 Championship results ===
(key) (Races in bold indicate pole position) (Races in italics indicate fastest lap)

Year	Entrant	1	2	3	4	5	6	7	8	9	10	11	12	13	14	15	16	17	18	Pos	Points
2018	MP Motorsport	CAT; FEA	CAT; SPR	LEC; FEA	LEC; SPR	RBR; FEA	RBR; SPR	SIL; FEA	SIL; SPR	HUN; FEA	HUN; SPR	SPA; FEA	SPA; SPR	MNZ; FEA	MNZ; SPR	SOC; FEA	SOC; SPR	YMC; FEA; 19	YMC; SPR; 13	26th	0
2019	Prema Racing	CAT; FEA; 7	CAT; SPR; 1	LEC; FEA; 1	LEC; SPR; 3	RBR; FEA; 4	RBR; SPR; 2	SIL; FEA; 2	SIL; SPR; 28†	HUN; FEA; 11	HUN; SPR; 7	**SPA**; **FEA**; 3	SPA; SPR; 5	MNZ; FEA; 2	MNZ; SPR; 13	SOC; FEA; 5	SOC; SPR; 14			3rd	157

^{†} Driver did not finish the race, but was classified as he completed over 90% of the race distance.

=== Complete FIA Formula 2 Championship results ===
(key) (Races in bold indicate pole position) (Races in italics indicate points for the fastest lap of top ten finishers)

Year	Entrant	1	2	3	4	5	6	7	8	9	10	11	12	13	14	15	16	17	18	19	20	21	22	23	24	25	26	27	28	DC	Points
2020	Carlin	RBR; FEA; 12	RBR; SPR; 16	RBR; FEA; 12	RBR; SPR; 9	HUN; FEA; 6	HUN; SPR; 7	SIL; FEA; 12	SIL; SPR; 4	SIL; FEA; 12	SIL; SPR; 9	CAT; FEA; 17	CAT; SPR; 17	SPA; FEA; 19	SPA; SPR; 16	MNZ; FEA; 10	MNZ; SPR; 6	MUG; FEA; 10	MUG; SPR; 7	SOC; FEA; 5	SOC; SPR; 11	BHR; FEA; 3	BHR; SPR; Ret	BHR; FEA; 7	BHR; SPR; 1					12th	72
2021	Carlin	BHR; SP1; 2	BHR; SP2; 4	BHR; FEA; 6	MCO; SP1; 11	MCO; SP2; 8	MCO; FEA; Ret	BAK; SP1; 4	BAK; SP2; 3	BAK; FEA; 7	SIL; SP1; 12	SIL; SP2; 19	SIL; FEA; 10	MNZ; SP1; 9	MNZ; SP2; 1	MNZ; FEA; 5	SOC; SP1; 12	SOC; SP2; C	SOC; FEA; 3	JED; SP1; 10	JED; SP2; 14	JED; FEA; 11	YMC; SP1; 1	YMC; SP2; 7	YMC; FEA; 11					7th	113
2022	Prema Racing	BHR; SPR; 2	BHR; FEA; 12	JED; SPR; 7	JED; FEA; 3	IMO; SPR; 2	IMO; FEA; 9	CAT; SPR; 4	CAT; FEA; Ret	MCO; SPR; 2	MCO; FEA; 8	BAK; SPR; 2	BAK; FEA; 4	SIL; SPR; 8	SIL; FEA; 7	RBR; SPR; 11	RBR; FEA; 12	LEC; SPR; 2	LEC; FEA; 7	HUN; SPR; 17	HUN; FEA; 11	SPA; SPR; DNS	SPA; FEA; 20	ZAN; SPR; 16	ZAN; FEA; 10	MNZ; SPR; 3	MNZ; FEA; 1	YMC; SPR; Ret	YMC; FEA; 13	7th	126
2023	MP Motorsport	BHR; SPR; 6	BHR; FEA; 17	JED; SPR; 3	JED; FEA; 3	MEL; SPR; 17	MEL; FEA; 6	BAK; SPR; 14†	BAK; FEA; 14	MCO; SPR; 2	MCO; FEA; 13	CAT; SPR; 19†	CAT; FEA; 14	RBR; SPR; Ret	RBR; FEA; 10	SIL; SPR; 11	SIL; FEA; 6	HUN; SPR; 5	HUN; FEA; 11	SPA; SPR; Ret	SPA; FEA; Ret	ZAN; SPR; 10	ZAN; FEA; 17	MNZ; SPR; 17	MNZ; FEA; 7	YMC; SPR	YMC; FEA			12th	59

=== Complete F3 Asian Championship results ===
(key) (Races in bold indicate pole position) (Races in italics indicate fastest lap)

Year	Entrant	1	2	3	4	5	6	7	8	9	10	11	12	13	14	15	DC	Points
2021	Mumbai Falcons India Racing Ltd.	DUB; 1; 3	DUB; 2; 7	DUB; 3; 7	**ABU**; **1**; 1	ABU; 2; 1	ABU; 3; 2	**ABU**; **1**; 2	ABU; 2; 6	**ABU**; **3**; 1	DUB; 1; 5	DUB; 2; 12	DUB; 3 Ret	ABU; 1; 7	ABU; 2; 3	ABU; 3; 3	3rd	192

=== Complete Formula E results ===
(key) (Races in bold indicate pole position; races in italics indicate fastest lap)

Year	Team	Chassis	Powertrain	1	2	3	4	5	6	7	8	9	10	11	12	13	14	15	16	Pos	Points
2023–24	Maserati MSG Racing	Formula E Gen3	Maserati Tipo Folgore	MEX; 16	DRH; 20	DRH; Ret	SAP; 15	TOK; 17	MIS; Ret	MIS; 9	MCO; 20	BER; 17	BER; 7	SHA; 19	SHA; 17	POR; 16	POR; 12	LDN; 18	LDN; Ret	21st	8

Sporting positions
Preceded by Lando Norris	New Zealand Grand Prix; Winner; 2017	Succeeded by Richard Verschoor
