= Charouz Racing System =

Racing team from the Czech Republic

(Czech Republic) Charouz Racing System
- Founded: 1985
- Base: Prague, Czech Republic
- Team principal(s): Antonín Charouz
- Former series: Formula 3000; World Series Formula V8 3.5; F3000 International Masters; A1 Grand Prix; Auto GP; FIA GT3 European Championship; Formula 4 UAE Championship; ADAC Formula 4 FIA Formula 2 Championship; FIA Formula 3 Championship
- Teams' Championships: F3000 International Masters: 2006; Le Mans Series: 2009: LMP1; FIA GT3 European Championship: 2012; FIA GT Series: 2013: Pro-Am Cup; 2013: Gentlemen's Trophy; World Series Formula V8 3.5: 2017; ADAC Formula 4; 2018, 2019
- Drivers' Championships: F3000 International Masters: 2006: Jan Charouz; Le Mans Series: 2009: Jan Charouz, Tomáš Enge, Stefan Mücke; FIA GT3 European Championship: 2012: Dominik Baumann, Maximilian Buhk; FIA GT Series: 2013 Pro-Am Cup: Sergey Afanasyev, Andreas Simonsen; 2013 Gentlemen's Trophy: Petr Charouz, Jan Stoviček; World Series Formula V8 3.5: 2017: Pietro Fittipaldi; ADAC Formula 4: 2018: Lirim Zendeli; 2019: Théo Pourchaire
- Website: http://charouz-racing.com

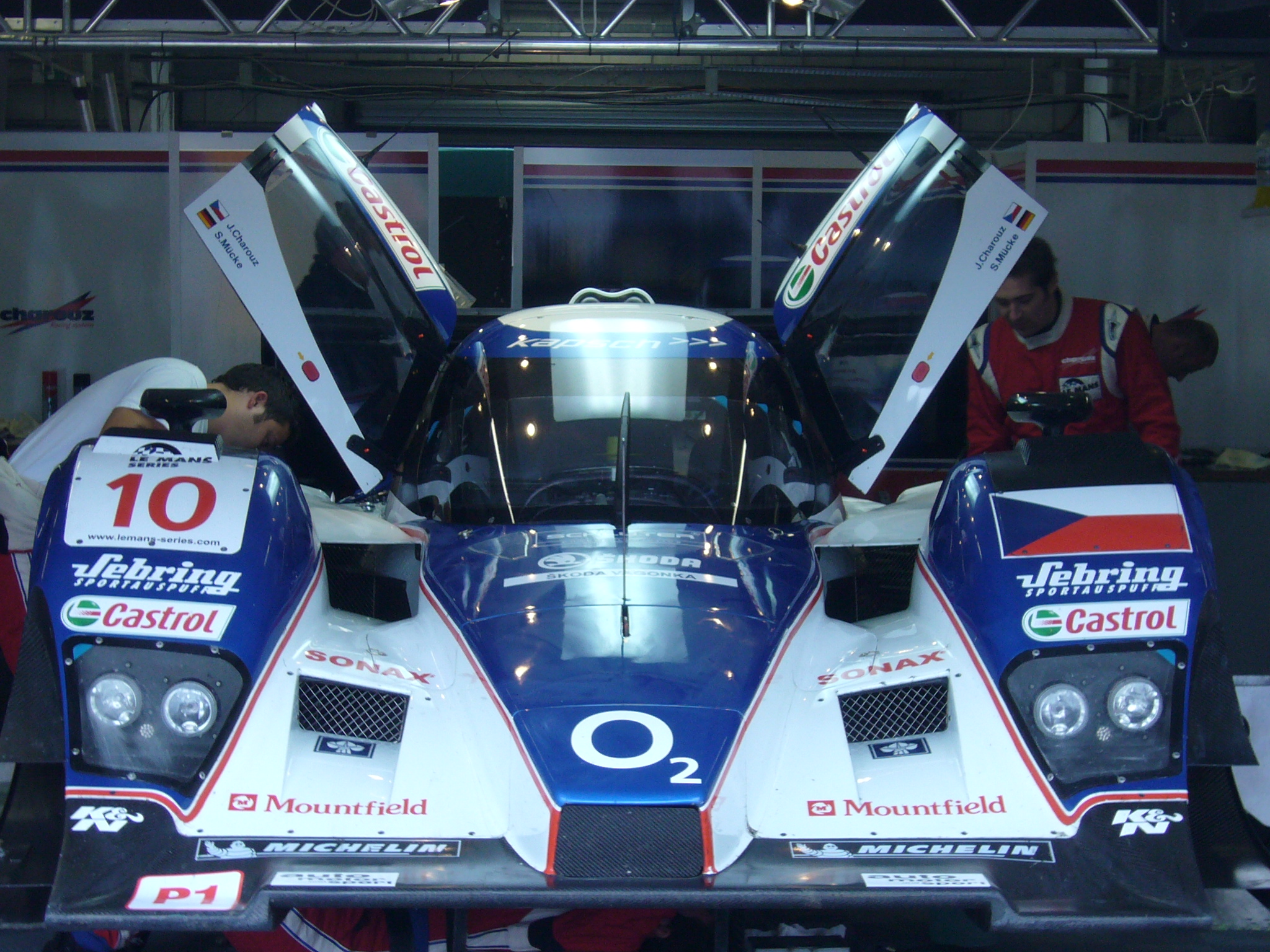
Charouz's Lola B08/60-Aston Martin which the team campaigned in the Le Mans Series

Charouz Racing System (CHRS, also was known as Lotus in World Series Formula V8 3.5) is a racing team from Czech Republic, created in 1985 by Antonín Charouz.

== History ==
In the 1980s, Charouz participated in the European Championship of Circuit Races' 1600 cc division in a Toyota Corolla. By 1992, they prepared cars for a special cup series for Ford Fiestas, Escort RS 2000s and Pumas.

Since 1998, Charouz has competed in the European Rally Championship, Slovak Championship and European Zone series.

When the A1 Grand Prix series debuted in 2005, Charouz managed the A1 Team Czech Republic. The team later took over management duties for A1 Team Brazil.

New for 2007 was the entrance into endurance racing with the Le Mans Series. Competing with a Lola-Judd prototype, the team finished the year fifth in their class championship, including a second-place finish at Valencia. For 2008 the team entered a cooperation with Aston Martin Racing and Prodrive, running a new Lola B08/60 coupe in the Le Mans Series and the 24 Hours of Le Mans. The B07/17 from 2007 was entered at Le Mans under the Charouz banner, but the car was run by Greg Pickett's Team Cytosport with help from Sam Hignett's Jota Sport, the same organization who prepared this car for Charouz in 2007.

In 2010 Charouz ran four cars in the Auto GP series.

In 2018, following the collapse of the World Series Formula V8 3.5, Charouz joined the FIA Formula 2 Championship, fielding Antonio Fuoco and Louis Delétraz, and collaborated with Ralf Schumacher's US Racing outfit in the ADAC Formula 4 championship. This saw the team claim two wins from Fuoco in Formula 2, including a double podium at the sprint race in Monaco, to finish sixth in the constructors' standings while claiming both the ADAC Formula 4 drivers' and constructors' titles with Lirim Zendeli.

In November 2018, it was announced that Charouz would serve as a junior team to the Sauber Formula One team from 2019 onwards. For 2019, the team expanded into the newly created FIA Formula 3 Championship, while continuing its collaboration with US Racing in ADAC Formula 4.

In December 2019, after a season competing as the Sauber Junior Team, Charouz revealed that it would revert to its former name for 2020. Louis Delétraz and Pedro Piquet were the first drivers to be announced for the squad. Both drove for the Charouz Racing System in its third consecutive season in the FIA Formula 2 Championship.

For the 2021 season of the FIA Formula 2 Championship, Charouz initially ran with a lineup consisting of German David Beckmann and Brazilian Guilherme Samaia, with former Formula 3 driver Enzo Fittipaldi replacing David starting at the round in Monza. Logan Sargeant would take Charouz's lone victory in FIA Formula 3 that year, helping the team to 5th in the constructor's championship.

Fittipaldi would continue for 2022, partnering Cem Bölükbaşı at the start of the season. Their Formula 3 team ran 8 different drivers throughout the season, and finished 10th in the championship, with Francesco Pizzi scoring the team's solitary point.

In 2023, German team PHM Racing took over the assets of the Charouz F2 and F3 teams, racing under the moniker PHM Racing by Charouz.

From the 2024 season onwards, the F2 and F3 teams were fully rebranded to PHM AIX Racing, and then to AIX Racing, after an acquisition from the AIX Investment Group.

== Former series results ==
=== FIA Formula 2 Championship ===
Year	Chassis	Engine	Tyres	Drivers	Races	Wins	Poles	F. Laps	Podiums	D.C.	Pts	T.C.	Pts
2018	Dallara; F2 2018	Mecachrome; V634T V6 t	P	(Italy) Antonio Fuoco	23	2	0	1	6	7th	141	6th	215
2018	Dallara; F2 2018	Mecachrome; V634T V6 t	P	(Switzerland) Louis Delétraz	24	0	0	0	2	10th	74	6th	215
2019	Dallara; F2 2018	Mecachrome; V634T V6 t	P	(United Kingdom) Callum Ilott	21	0	1	0	2	11th	74	6th	110
2019	Dallara; F2 2018	Mecachrome; V634T V6 t	P	(United States) Juan Manuel Correa	16	0	0	0	2	13th	36	6th	110
2019	Dallara; F2 2018	Mecachrome; V634T V6 t	P	(Russia) Matevos Isaakyan	4	0	0	0	0	25th	0	6th	110
2020	Dallara; F2 2018	Mecachrome; V634T V6 t	P	(Switzerland) Louis Delétraz	24	0	0	2	5	8th	134	7th	137
2020	Dallara; F2 2018	Mecachrome; V634T V6 t	P	(Brazil) Pedro Piquet	24	0	0	0	0	20th	3	7th	137
2021	Dallara; F2 2018	Mecachrome; V634T V6 t	P	(Germany) David Beckmann	12	0	0	0	2	15th	25 (Note: 32 points scored in total during the season, including for other teams.)	10th	28
2021	Dallara; F2 2018	Mecachrome; V634T V6 t	P	(Brazil) Enzo Fittipaldi	8	0	0	0	0	20th	2	10th	28
2021	Dallara; F2 2018	Mecachrome; V634T V6 t	P	(Netherlands) Richard Verschoor	3	0	0	0	0	11th	1 (Note: 56 points scored in total during the season, including for other teams.)	10th	28
2021	Dallara; F2 2018	Mecachrome; V634T V6 t	P	(Brazil) Guilherme Samaia	23	0	0	0	0	24th	0	10th	28
2022	Dallara; F2 2018	Mecachrome; V634T V6 t	P	(Brazil) Enzo Fittipaldi	28	0	0	0	6	8th	126	8th	130
2022	Dallara; F2 2018	Mecachrome; V634T V6 t	P	(Turkey) Cem Bölükbaşı	16	0	0	0	0	24th	0	8th	130
2022	Dallara; F2 2018	Mecachrome; V634T V6 t	P	(Germany) David Beckmann	2	0	0	0	0	18th	4 (Note: 25 points scored in total during the season, including for other teams.)	8th	130
2022	Dallara; F2 2018	Mecachrome; V634T V6 t	P	(Colombia) Tatiana Calderón	7	0	0	0	0	28th	0	8th	130

==== In detail ====
(key) (Races in bold indicate pole position) (Races in italics indicate fastest lap)

Year	Drivers	1	2	3	4	5	6	7	8	9	10	11	12	13	14	15	16	17	18	19	20	21	22	23	24	25	26	27	28	T.C.	Points
2018		BHR; FEA	BHR; SPR	BAK; FEA	BAK; SPR	CAT; FEA	CAT; SPR	MON; FEA	MON; SPR	LEC; FEA	LEC; SPR	RBR; FEA	RBR; SPR	SIL; FEA	SIL; SPR	HUN; FEA	HUN; SPR	SPA; FEA	SPA; SPR	MNZ; FEA	MNZ; SPR	SOC; FEA	SOC; SPR	YMC; FEA	YMC; SPR					6th	215
2018	(Switzerland) Louis Delétraz	13	9	Ret	10	Ret	10	4	2	6	2	Ret	Ret	4	5	17	9	18	13	13	11	12	13	6	6					6th	215
2018	(Italy) Antonio Fuoco	17	12	3	DNS	10	7	8	1	4	4	3	4	3	Ret	3	17	17	19	DSQ	10	6	9	7	1					6th	215
2019		BHR; FEA	BHR; SPR	BAK; FEA	BAK; SPR	CAT; FEA	CAT; SPR	MON; FEA	MON; SPR	LEC; FEA	LEC; SPR	RBR; FEA	RBR; SPR	SIL; FEA	SIL; SPR	HUN; FEA	HUN; SPR	SPA; FEA	SPA; SPR	MNZ; FEA	MNZ; SPR	SOC; FEA	SOC; SPR	YMC; FEA	YMC; SPR					6th	110
2019	(United Kingdom) Callum Ilott	14	16	Ret	9	8	3	DNS	14	Ret	8	14	9	8	4	10	10	C	C	**4**	12	9	3	5	4					6th	110
2019	(United States) Juan Manuel Correa	16	18	7	2	Ret	15	16†	12	7	2	11	10	12	10	14	14	C	C											6th	110
2019	(Russia) Matevos Isaakyan																					18	13	15	Ret					6th	110
2020		RBR; FEA	RBR; SPR	RBR; FEA	RBR; SPR	HUN; FEA	HUN; SPR	SIL; FEA	SIL; SPR	SIL; FEA	SIL; SPR	CAT; FEA	CAT; SPR	SPA; FEA	SPA; SPR	MNZ; FEA	MNZ; SPR	MUG; FEA	MUG; SPR	SOC; FEA	SOC; SPR	BHR; FEA	BHR; SPR	BHR; FEA	BHR; SPR					7th	137
2020	(Switzerland) Louis Delétraz	7	2	19	12	7	6	6	3	5	4	10	9	4	6	8	4	3	2	18	17	16	3	12	13					7th	137
2020	(Brazil) Pedro Piquet	13	13	18	14	14	15	11	17	21	16	14	7	12	12	12	17	13	12	17	9	11	19†	10	11					7th	137
2021		BHR; SP1	BHR; SP2	BHR; FEA	MON; SP1	MON; SP2	MON; FEA	BAK; SP1	BAK; SP2	BAK; FEA	SIL; SP1	SIL; SP2	SIL; FEA	MNZ; SP1	MNZ; SP2	MNZ; FEA	SOC; SP1	SOC; SP2	SOC; FEA	JED; SP1	JED; SP2	JED; FEA	YMC; SP1	YMC; SP2	YMC; FEA					10th	28
2021	(Germany) David Beckmann	3	7	11	12	Ret	13	9	2	12	13	8	15																	10th	28
2021	(Brazil) Enzo Fittipaldi													Ret	16	11	17	C	12	12	7	Ret								10th	28
2021	(Netherlands) Richard Verschoor																						Ret	11	10					10th	28
2021	(Brazil) Guilherme Samaia	11	11	16	17	13	15	17	14	18	Ret	17	20	Ret	Ret	Ret	13	C	13	Ret	Ret	17	16	12	16					10th	28
2022		BHR; SPR	BHR; FEA	JED; SPR	JED; FEA	IMO; SPR	IMO; FEA	CAT; SPR	CAT; FEA	MON; SPR	MON; FEA	BAK; SPR	BAK; FEA	SIL; SPR	SIL; FEA	RBR; SPR	RBR; FEA	LEC; SPR	LEC; FEA	HUN; SPR	HUN; FEA	SPA; SPR	SPA; FEA	ZAN; SPR	ZAN; FEA	MNZ; SPR	MNZ; FEA	YMC; SPR	YMC; FEA	8th	130
2022	(Brazil) Enzo Fittipaldi	11	13	10	11	12	2	8	6	4	5	Ret	6	3	11	8	2	Ret	10	3	2	13	10	13	5	12	3	Ret	14	8th	130
2022	(Turkey) Cem Bölükbaşı	14	14	WD	WD			18	20	12	11	18†	Ret	19	18	NC	Ret	15	Ret	16	13									8th	130
2022	(Germany) David Beckmann					Ret	8																							8th	130
2022	(Colombia) Tatiana Calderón																					19	18	Ret	Ret	Ret	DNS	20	18	8th	130

=== FIA Formula 3 Championship ===
Year	Chassis	Engine	Tyres	Drivers	Races	Wins	Poles	F. Laps	Podiums	D.C.	Pts	T.C.	Pts
2019	Dallara; F3 2019	Mecachrome; V634 V6	P	(Germany) Lirim Zendeli	14	0	0	0	0	18th	6	8th	15
2019	Dallara; F3 2019	Mecachrome; V634 V6	P	(Switzerland) Fabio Scherer	16	0	0	0	0	17th	7	8th	15
2019	Dallara; F3 2019	Mecachrome; V634 V6	P	(United Kingdom) Raoul Hyman	16	0	0	0	0	22nd	2	8th	15
2020	Dallara; F3 2019	Mecachrome; V634 V6	P	(Czech Republic) Roman Staněk	18	0	0	0	0	21st	3	10th	5
2020	Dallara; F3 2019	Mecachrome; V634 V6	P	(Brazil) Igor Fraga	16	0	0	0	0	24th	1	10th	5
2020	Dallara; F3 2019	Mecachrome; V634 V6	P	(Germany) David Schumacher	12	0	0	0	0	28th	0	10th	5
2020	Dallara; F3 2019	Mecachrome; V634 V6	P	(Russia) Michael Belov	6	0	0	0	0	23rd	1	10th	5
2021	Dallara; F3 2019	Mecachrome; V634 V6	P	(United States) Logan Sargeant	20	1	0	0	4	7th	102	5th	127
2021	Dallara; F3 2019	Mecachrome; V634 V6	P	(Brazil) Enzo Fittipaldi	12	0	0	0	1	17th	25	5th	127
2021	Dallara; F3 2019	Mecachrome; V634 V6	P	(United States) Hunter Yeany	6	0	0	0	0	33rd	0	5th	127
2021	Dallara; F3 2019	Mecachrome; V634 V6	P	(United Kingdom) Ayrton Simmons	2	0	0	0	0	35th	0	5th	127
2021	Dallara; F3 2019	Mecachrome; V634 V6	P	(France) Reshad de Gerus	12	0	0	1	0	28th	0	5th	127
2021	Dallara; F3 2019	Mecachrome; V634 V6	P	(Portugal) Zdeněk Chovanec	8	0	0	0	0	34th	0	5th	127
2022	Dallara; F3 2019	Mecachrome; V634 V6	P	(Hungary) László Tóth	18	0	0	0	0	37th	0	10th	1
2022	Dallara; F3 2019	Mecachrome; V634 V6	P	(United Kingdom) Ayrton Simmons	2	0	0	0	0	35th	0	10th	1
2022	Dallara; F3 2019	Mecachrome; V634 V6	P	(Germany) David Schumacher	4	0	0	0	0	28th	0	10th	1
2022	Dallara; F3 2019	Mecachrome; V634 V6	P	(Germany) Lirim Zendeli	2	0	0	0	0	31st	0	10th	1
2022	Dallara; F3 2019	Mecachrome; V634 V6	P	(Portugal) Zdeněk Chovanec	4	0	0	0	0	40th	0	10th	1
2022	Dallara; F3 2019	Mecachrome; V634 V6	P	(United Kingdom) Christian Mansell	4	0	0	0	0	38th	0	10th	1
2022	Dallara; F3 2019	Mecachrome; V634 V6	P	(Italy) Alessandro Famularo	2	0	0	0	0	39th	0	10th	1
2022	Dallara; F3 2019	Mecachrome; V634 V6	P	(Italy) Francesco Pizzi	18	0	0	0	0	27th	1	10th	1

==== In detail ====
(key) (Races in bold indicate pole position) (Races in italics indicate fastest lap)

Year	Drivers	1	2	3	4	5	6	7	8	9	10	11	12	13	14	15	16	17	18	19	20	21	T.C.	Points
2019		CAT; FEA	CAT; SPR	LEC; FEA	LEC; SPR	RBR; FEA	RBR; SPR	SIL; FEA	SIL; SPR	HUN; FEA	HUN; SPR	SPA; FEA	SPA; SPR	MNZ; FEA	MNZ; SPR	SOC; FEA	SOC; SPR						8th	15
2019	(Germany) Lirim Zendeli	14	11	Ret	16	8	7	15	9	Ret	20	22	22†	Ret	18	WD	WD						8th	15
2019	(Switzerland) Fabio Scherer	27	Ret	15	Ret	Ret	23	16	8	15	13	27	18	8	7	Ret	Ret						8th	15
2019	(United Kingdom) Raoul Hyman	21	Ret	17	13	19	16	Ret	18	22	25	26	Ret	15	17	9	13						8th	15
2020		RBR; FEA	RBR; SPR	RBR; FEA	RBR; SPR	HUN; FEA	HUN; SPR	SIL; FEA	SIL; SPR	SIL; FEA	SIL; SPR	CAT; FEA	CAT; SPR	SPA; FEA	SPA; SPR	MNZ; FEA	MNZ; SPR	MUG; FEA	MUG; SPR				10th	5
2020	(Czech Republic) Roman Staněk	17	23	17	24	23	20	17	18	22	15	22	19	24	18	11	8	26†	18				10th	5
2020	(Brazil) Igor Fraga	16	25	26	14	15	Ret	15	Ret	18	10	24	18	19	27	24	17						10th	5
2020	(Germany) David Schumacher	25	15	12	17	16	13	25	15	15	Ret	23	25										10th	5
2020	(Russia) Michael Belov													20	Ret	10	13	27	23				10th	5
2021		CAT; SP1	CAT; SP2	CAT; FEA	LEC; SP1	LEC; SP2	LEC; FEA	RBR; SP1	RBR; SP2	RBR; FEA	HUN; SP1	HUN; SP2	HUN; FEA	SPA; SP1	SPA; SP2	SPA; FEA	ZAN; SP1	ZAN; SP2	ZAN; FEA	SOC; SP1	SOC; SP2	SOC; FEA	5th	127
2021	(United States) Logan Sargeant	4	Ret	9	4	12	Ret	15	Ret	8	3	9	10	8	3	7	2	10	6	1	C	4	5th	127
2021	(Brazil) Enzo Fittipaldi	12	Ret	19	21	17	11	4	8	15	12	2	9										5th	127
2021	(United States) Hunter Yeany													18	26	NC	Ret	23	22				5th	127
2021	(United Kingdom) Ayrton Simmons																			24	C	21	5th	127
2021	(France) Reshad de Gerus	20	13	23	19	25	21	20	23	17	24	18	20										5th	127
2021	(Portugal) Zdeněk Chovanec													26	23	24	26	20	23	26	C	20	5th	127
2022		BHR; SPR	BHR; FEA	IMO; SPR	IMO; FEA	CAT; SPR	CAT; FEA	SIL; SPR	SIL; FEA	RBR; SPR	RBR; FEA	HUN; SPR	HUN; FEA	SPA; SPR	SPA; FEA	ZAN; SPR	ZAN; FEA	MNZ; SPR	MNZ; FEA				10th	1
2022	(Hungary) László Tóth	22	24	19	25	26	23	Ret	21	23	19	26	Ret	22	25	27	22	22	19				10th	1
2022	(United Kingdom) Ayrton Simmons	18	19																				10th	1
2022	(Germany) David Schumacher			18	12											20	15						10th	1
2022	(Germany) Lirim Zendeli					20	15																10th	1
2022	(Portugal) Zdeněk Chovanec							Ret	24	26	Ret												10th	1
2022	(United Kingdom) Christian Mansell											22	23	Ret	23								10th	1
2022	(Italy) Alessandro Famularo																	23	23				10th	1
2022	(Italy) Francesco Pizzi	19	Ret	10	Ret	24	18	24	14	15	24	21	27	19	21	16	18	17	16				10th	1

=== Formula 3000 ===
International Formula 3000 results
Year	Car	Drivers	Races	Wins	Poles	F.L.	Points	D.C.	T.C.
2003	Lola B02/50-Zytek Judd	(Czech Republic) Jaroslav Janiš	9	0	0	0	20	7th	6th
2003	Lola B02/50-Zytek Judd	(France) Yannick Schroeder	8	0	0	0	13	12th	6th

=== A1 Grand Prix ===
A1 Grand Prix results
Year	Car	Team	Races	Wins	Poles	Fast laps	Points	T.C.
2005–06	Lola A1GP-Zytek	A1 Team Czech Republic	22	1	0	0	56	12th
2006–07	Lola A1GP-Zytek	A1 Team Czech Republic	22	0	0	0	27	12th
2006–07	Lola A1GP-Zytek	A1 Team Brazil	22	0	0	0	9	18th
2007–08	Lola A1GP-Zytek	A1 Team Czech Republic	20	0	0	0	10	19th

=== F3000 International Masters ===
F3000 International Masters results
Year	Car	Drivers	Races	Wins	Poles	Fast laps	Points	D.C.	T.C.
2006	Lola B02/50-Zytek	(Czech Republic) Jan Charouz	15	2	0	0	75	**1st**	1st
2006	Lola B02/50-Zytek	(Czech Republic) Jaroslav Janiš	6	4	2	4	54	**3rd**	1st
2006	Lola B02/50-Zytek	(Brazil) Luiz Razia	3	3	0	2	30	8th	1st
2006	Lola B02/50-Zytek	(Czech Republic) Filip Salaquarda	2	0	0	1	16	12th	1st
2006	Lola B02/50-Zytek	(Czech Republic) Tomáš Kostka	2	1	1	1	11	16th	1st
2006	Lola B02/50-Zytek	(Russia) Vitaly Petrov	2	0	1	1	0	NC	1st

=== 24 Hours of Le Mans ===
24 Hours of Le Mans results
Year	Class	Tyres	Car	Drivers	Pole	Fast lap	Laps	Pos.	Class Pos.
2007	LMP1	**M**	Lola B07/17-Judd GV5.5 S2 5.5L V10	(Czech Republic) Jan Charouz (Germany) Stefan Mücke (Malaysia) Alex Yoong	no	no	338	8th	5th
2008	LMP1	**M**	Lola B08/60-Aston Martin 6.0L V12	(Czech Republic) Jan Charouz (Czech Republic) Tomáš Enge (Germany) Stefan Mücke	no	no	354	9th	9th
2008	LMP1	**M**	Lola B07/17-Judd GV5.5 S2 5.5L V10	(United States) Greg Pickett (Germany) Klaus Graf (Netherlands) Jan Lammers	no	no	146	DNF	DNF
2009	LMP1	**M**	Lola-Aston Martin B09/60-Aston Martin 6.0L V12	(Czech Republic) Jan Charouz (Czech Republic) Tomáš Enge (Germany) Stefan Mücke	no	no	373	4th	4th

=== Le Mans Series ===
Le Mans Series results
Year	Class	Car	Drivers	Races	Wins	Poles	Fast laps	Points	T.C.
2007	LMP1	Lola B07/17-Judd GV5.5 S2 5.5L V10	(Czech Republic) Jan Charouz (Germany) Stefan Mücke (Malaysia) Alex Yoong	6	0	0	0	15	5th
2008	LMP1	Lola B08/60-Aston Martin 6.0L V12	(Czech Republic) Jan Charouz (Germany) Stefan Mücke	5	0	0	0	19	5th
2009	LMP1	Lola B09/60-Aston Martin 6.0L V12	(Czech Republic) Tomáš Enge (Czech Republic) Jan Charouz (Germany) Stefan Mücke	5	2	1	?	39	**1st**

=== Formula Renault 3.5 Series ===
Formula Renault 3.5 Results
Year (Note: The team competed as Gravity–Charouz Racing in 2011 and as Lotus in 2012-2015.)	Car	Drivers	Races	Wins	Poles	F.L.	Points	D.C.	T.C.
2011	Dallara T08-Renault	(New Zealand) Brendon Hartley	17	0	0	2	95	7th	7th
2011	Dallara T08-Renault	(Czech Republic) Jan Charouz	17	0	0	1	10	25th	7th
2012	Dallara T12-Renault	(Denmark) Marco Sørensen	17	1	0	0	122	6th	6th
2012	Dallara T12-Renault	(Estonia) Kevin Korjus (Note: Kevin Korjus joined Charouz for the last three rounds of 2012 season. At that point he had collected 49 points with Tech 1 Racing.)	17	0	0	0	69	10th	6th
2012	Dallara T12-Renault	(Netherlands) Nigel Melker	2	0	0	0	15	19th	6th
2012	Dallara T12-Renault	(New Zealand) Richie Stanaway	5	0	0	0	8	22nd	6th
2012	Dallara T12-Renault	(Brazil) César Ramos	4	0	0	0	0	30th	6th
2013	Dallara T12-Renault	(Denmark) Marco Sørensen	17	2	2	1	113	7th	7th
2013	Dallara T12-Renault	(Philippines) Marlon Stöckinger	17	0	0	0	23	18th	7th
2014	Dallara T12-Renault	(France) Matthieu Vaxivière	13	0	0	0	83	8th	5th
2014	Dallara T12-Renault	(Philippines) Marlon Stöckinger	17	0	0	0	73	9th	5th
2014	Dallara T12-Renault	(New Zealand) Richie Stanaway	4	0	0	0	21	18th	5th
2015	Dallara T12-Renault	(France) Matthieu Vaxivière	18	3	5	5	234	**2nd**	**2nd**
2015	Dallara T12-Renault	(Netherlands) Meindert van Buuren	9	0	0	1	20	15th	**2nd**
2015	Dallara T12-Renault	(Philippines) Marlon Stöckinger	8	0	0	0	14	17th	**2nd**
2015	Dallara T12-Renault	(United Kingdom) Nick Yelloly	2	0	0	0	6	20th	**2nd**

=== World Series Formula V8 3.5 ===
World Series Formula V8 3.5 Results
Year (Note: The team competed as Lotus.)	Car	Drivers	Races	Wins	Poles	F.L.	Points	D.C.	T.C.
2016	Dallara T12-Zytek	(Austria) René Binder	18	0	0	0	161	7th	**2nd**
2016	Dallara T12-Zytek	(Israel) Roy Nissany	18	3	3	5	189	4th	**2nd**
2017	Dallara T12-Zytek	(Austria) René Binder	18	4	2	3	201	4th	**1st**
2017	Dallara T12-Zytek	(Brazil) Pietro Fittipaldi	18	6	10	2	259	**1st**	**1st**

=== Auto GP ===
Auto GP Results
Year (Note: The team competed as Gravity–Charouz Racing.)	Car	Drivers	Races	Wins	Poles	F.L.	Points	D.C.	T.C.
2010	Dallara T12-Zytek	(Czech Republic) Tomáš Kostka	2	0	0	0	0	27th	2nd
2010	Dallara T12-Zytek	(Monaco) Stefano Coletti	2	0	0	0	2	20th	2nd
2010	Dallara T12-Zytek	(Switzerland) Natacha Gachnang	6	0	0	0	1	21st	2nd
2010	Dallara T12-Zytek	(Argentina) Esteban Guerrieri	2	0	0	0	5	18th	2nd
2010	Dallara T12-Zytek	(Austria) Walter Grubmüller	6	0	0	0	2	19th	2nd
2010	Dallara T12-Zytek	(United Kingdom) Alexander Sims	4	0	0	0	0	25th	2nd
2010	Dallara T12-Zytek	(Czech Republic) Jan Charouz	12	0	0	0	36	4th	2nd
2010	Dallara T12-Zytek	(France) Adrien Tambay	12	1	0	1	29	6th	2nd

=== ADAC Formula 4 ===
Year (Note: Charouz Racing System competed under the name US Racing - CHRS.)	Car	Drivers	Races	Wins	Poles	Fast laps	Points	D.C.	T.C.
2018	Tatuus F4-T014	(Czech Republic) Petr Ptáček	3	0	0	0	0	NC†	1st
2018	Tatuus F4-T014	(Germany) David Schumacher	21	0	0	0	103	9th	1st
2018	Tatuus F4-T014	(Austria) Mick Wishofer	21	1	0	3	160	6th	1st
2018	Tatuus F4-T014	(Germany) Lirim Zendeli	21	10	8	8	348	**1st**	1st
2018	Tatuus F4-T014	(Czech Republic) Tom Beckhäuser	21	0	0	0	4	21st	1st
2019	Tatuus F4-T014	(Czech Republic) Roman Staněk	20	2	0	1	165	4th	1st
2019	Tatuus F4-T014	(Monaco) Arthur Leclerc	20	1	1	2	202	**3rd**	1st
2019	Tatuus F4-T014	(France) Théo Pourchaire	20	4	6	2	258	**1st**	1st
2019	Tatuus F4-T014	(France) Alessandro Ghiretti	20	0	0	0	136	6th	1st

=== Formula 4 UAE Championship ===
Year	Car	Drivers	Races	Wins	Poles	Fast laps	Points	D.C.	T.C.
2017–18 (Note: Charouz Racing System competed under the name Cram Motorsport / Charouz Racing.)	Tatuus F4-T014	(Czech Republic) Tom Beckhäuser (Note: Beckhäuser drove for Rasgaira Motorsports in round 5.)	22	1	0	1	262	**3rd**	4th

== Timeline ==
Former series
International Formula 3000	2003
A1 Grand Prix	2005–2008
F3000 International Masters	2006
Le Mans Series	2007–2009
Auto GP	2010
FIA GT3 European Championship	2011–2012
Formula Renault 3.5 Series	2011–2017
ADAC GT Masters	2012
Lamborghini Super Trofeo Europe	2012
FIA GT Series	2013
Eurocup Mégane Trophy	2013
Formula 4 UAE Championship	2017–2018
ADAC Formula 4	2018–2019
FIA Formula 2 Championship	2018–2023
FIA Formula 3 Championship	2019–2023

== Notes ==
Achievements
Preceded by Arden International	World Series Formula V8 3.5 Teams' Champion; 2017	Succeeded by None (Series ended)
