= 2021 Monza Formula 2 round =

Motor racing competition

(Italy) 2021 Monza Formula 2 round
Round details
- Round 5 of 8 in the 2021 FIA Formula 2 Championship.
- Location: Autodromo Nazionale di Monza, Monza, Italy
- Course: Permanent Circuit; 5.793 km (3.600 mi)

Sprint race 1
- Date: 11 September 2021
- Laps: 21
Podium
First	(France) Théo Pourchaire	ART Grand Prix
Second	(China) Guanyu Zhou	UNI-Virtuosi
Third	(Denmark) Christian Lundgaard	ART Grand Prix
Fastest lap
Driver	(France) Théo Pourchaire	ART Grand Prix
- Time: 1:34.314 (on lap 16)

Sprint race 2
- Date: 11 September 2021
- Laps: 21
Podium
First	(India) Jehan Daruvala	Carlin
Second	(Netherlands) Bent Viscaal	Trident
Third	(Russia) Robert Shwartzman	Prema Racing
Fastest lap
Driver	(Australia) Oscar Piastri	Prema Racing
- Time: 1:35.239 (on lap 6)

Feature race
- Date: 12 September 2021
- Laps: 30
Pole position
Driver	(Australia) Oscar Piastri	Prema Racing
Time	1:32.199	
Podium
First	(Australia) Oscar Piastri	Prema Racing
Second	(China) Guanyu Zhou	UNI-Virtuosi Racing
Third	(United Kingdom) Dan Ticktum	Carlin
Fastest lap
Driver	(New Zealand) Liam Lawson	Hitech Grand Prix
- Time: 1:35.000 (on lap 14)

The 2021 Monza Formula 2 round was the fifth round of the 2021 Formula 2 Championship and took place at the Monza Circuit from 10 to 12 September. It ran in support of the 2021 Italian Grand Prix and featured three races.

== Classification ==
=== Qualifying ===
Pos.	No.	Driver	Team	Time	Gap	Grid
1	2	(Australia) Oscar Piastri	Prema Racing	1:32.199	-	1
2	6	(India) Jehan Daruvala	Carlin	1:32.240	+0.041	2
3	3	(China) Guanyu Zhou	UNI-Virtuosi	1:32.256	+0.057	3
4	7	(New Zealand) Liam Lawson	Hitech Grand Prix	1:32.383	+0.184	4
5	4	(Brazil) Felipe Drugovich	UNI-Virtuosi	1:32.409	+0.210	5
6	21	(Switzerland) Ralph Boschung	Campos Racing	1:32.553	+0.354	6
7	10	(France) Théo Pourchaire	ART Grand Prix	1:32.586	+0.387	7
8	5	(United Kingdom) Dan Ticktum	Carlin	1:32.641	+0.442	8
9	8	(Estonia) Jüri Vips	Hitech Grand Prix	1:32.675	+0.476	9
10	20	(Germany) David Beckmann	Campos Racing	1:32.699	+0.500	10
11	12	(Germany) Lirim Zendeli	MP Motorsport	1:32.885	+0.686	11
12	1	(Russia) Robert Shwartzman	Prema Racing	1:32.942	+0.743	12
13	14	(Brazil) Enzo Fittipaldi	Charouz Racing System	1:32.965	+0.766	13
14	25	(Japan) Marino Sato	Trident	1:33.023	+0.824	14
15	16	(Israel) Roy Nissany	DAMS	1:33.031	+0.832	15
16	22	(United Kingdom) Jake Hughes	HWA Racelab	1:33.043	+0.844	16
17	17	(New Zealand) Marcus Armstrong	DAMS	1:33.054	+0.855	17
18	24	(Netherlands) Bent Viscaal	Trident	1:33.080	+0.881	18
19	9	(Denmark) Christian Lundgaard	ART Grand Prix	1:33.155	+0.956	19
20	11	(Netherlands) Richard Verschoor	MP Motorsport	1:33.193	+0.994	20
21	15	(Brazil) Guilherme Samaia	Charouz Racing System	1:33.478	+1.279	21
22	23	(Italy) Alessio Deledda	HWA Racelab	1:34.194	+1.995	22

=== Sprint race 1 ===
Pos.	No.	Driver	Entrant	Laps	Time/Retired	Grid	Points
1	10	(France) Théo Pourchaire	ART Grand Prix	21	39:12.495	4	15 (2)
2	3	(China) Guanyu Zhou	UNI-Virtuosi	21	+4.360	8	12
3	9	(Denmark) Christian Lundgaard	ART Grand Prix	21	+6.929	19	10
4	2	(Australia) Oscar Piastri	Prema Racing	21	+7.694	10	8
5	7	(New Zealand) Liam Lawson	Hitech Grand Prix	21	+9.767	7	6
6	1	(Russia) Robert Shwartzman	Prema Racing	21	+10.747	12	4
7	24	(Netherlands) Bent Viscaal	Trident	21	+11.504	18	2
8	8	(Estonia) Jüri Vips	Hitech Grand Prix	21	+12.789	2	1
9	6	(India) Jehan Daruvala	Carlin	21	+13.168	9	
10	20	(Germany) David Beckmann	Campos Racing	21	+15.232	1	
11	17	(New Zealand) Marcus Armstrong	DAMS	21	+15.646	17	
12	22	(United Kingdom) Jake Hughes	HWA Racelab	21	+18.840	PL	
13	23	(Italy) Alessio Deledda	HWA Racelab	21	+20.397	22	
14	21	(Switzerland) Ralph Boschung	Campos Racing	20	+1 lap	5	
15	12	(Germany) Lirim Zendeli	MP Motorsport	18	Engine	11	
DNF	25	(Japan) Marino Sato	Trident	16	Engine	14	
DNF	11	(Netherlands) Richard Verschoor	MP Motorsport	10	Mechanical	20	
DNF	16	(Israel) Roy Nissany	DAMS	9	Spun off	15	
DNF	15	(Brazil) Guilherme Samaia	Charouz Racing System	8	Mechanical	21	
DNF	4	(Brazil) Felipe Drugovich	UNI-Virtuosi	4	Accident	6	
DNF	14	(Brazil) Enzo Fittipaldi	Charouz Racing System	2	Mechanical	13	
DNF	5	(United Kingdom) Dan Ticktum	Carlin	1	Collision	3	
Fastest lap： (France) Théo Pourchaire − ART Grand Prix − 1:34.314 (lap 16)

=== Sprint race 2 ===
Pos.	No.	Driver	Entrant	Laps	Time/Retired	Grid	Points
1	6	(India) Jehan Daruvala	Carlin	21	34:37.701	2	15
2	24	(Netherlands) Bent Viscaal	Trident	21	+6.114	4	12
3	1	(Russia) Robert Shwartzman	Prema Racing	21	+9.388	5	10
4	7	(New Zealand) Liam Lawson	Hitech Grand Prix	21	+9.962	6	8
5	20	(Germany) David Beckmann	Campos Racing	21	+10.829	1	6
6	8	(Estonia) Jüri Vips	Hitech Grand Prix	21	+11.172	3	4
7	2	(Australia) Oscar Piastri	Prema Racing	21	+11.735	7	2 (2)
8	3	(China) Guanyu Zhou	UNI-Virtuosi	21	+12.215	9	1
9	21	(Switzerland) Ralph Boschung	Campos Racing	21	+12.945	14	
10	10	(France) Théo Pourchaire	ART Grand Prix	21	+15.425	10	
11	5	(United Kingdom) Dan Ticktum	Carlin	21	+15.649	22	
12	12	(Germany) Lirim Zendeli	MP Motorsport	21	+17.800	15	
13	11	(Netherlands) Richard Verschoor	MP Motorsport	21	+21.707	17	
14	9	(Denmark) Christian Lundgaard	ART Grand Prix	21	+25.467	8	
15	17	(New Zealand) Marcus Armstrong	DAMS	21	+26.811	11	
16	14	(Brazil) Enzo Fittipaldi	Charouz Racing System	21	+33.214	21	
17	4	(Brazil) Felipe Drugovich	UNI-Virtuosi	21	+35.354	20	
18	16	(Israel) Roy Nissany	DAMS	21	+40.049	18	
19	23	(Italy) Alessio Deledda	HWA Racelab	21	+43.472	13	
20	25	(Japan) Marino Sato	Trident	21	+1:22.126	16	
DNF	22	(United Kingdom) Jake Hughes	HWA Racelab	2	Collision	12	
DNF	15	(Brazil) Guilherme Samaia	Charouz Racing System	2	Mechanical	19	
Fastest lap： (Australia) Oscar Piastri − Prema Racing − 1:35.239 (lap 6)

=== Feature Race ===
Pos.	No.	Driver	Entrant	Laps	Time/Retired	Grid	Points
1	2	(Australia) Oscar Piastri	Prema Racing	30	56:39.491	1	25 (4)
2	3	(China) Guanyu Zhou	UNI-Virtuosi	30	+1.043	3	18
3	5	(United Kingdom) Dan Ticktum	Carlin	30	+1.818	8	15
4	10	(France) Théo Pourchaire	ART Grand Prix	30	+2.066	7	12
5	6	(India) Jehan Daruvala	Carlin	30	+2.445	2	10
6	1	(Russia) Robert Shwartzman	Prema Racing	30	+2.728	12	8
7	12	(Germany) Lirim Zendeli	MP Motorsport	30	+3.560	11	6
8	16	(Israel) Roy Nissany	DAMS	30	+3.964	15	4
9	17	(New Zealand) Marcus Armstrong	DAMS	30	+4.477	17	2
10	9	(Denmark) Christian Lundgaard	ART Grand Prix	30	+5.015	19	1
11	14	(Brazil) Enzo Fittipaldi	Charouz Racing System	30	+8.690	13	
12	4	(Brazil) Felipe Drugovich	UNI-Virtuosi	30	+8.793	5	
13	22	(United Kingdom) Jake Hughes	HWA Racelab	30	+10.106	16	
14	21	(Switzerland) Ralph Boschung	Campos Racing	30	+17.038	6	
15	24	(Netherlands) Bent Viscaal	Trident	28	Collision	18	
16	20	(Germany) David Beckmann	Campos Racing	28	Collision	10	
DNF	7	(New Zealand) Liam Lawson	Hitech Grand Prix	21	Mechanical	4	
DNF	23	(Italy) Alessio Deledda	HWA Racelab	14	Collision damage	22	
DNF	25	(Japan) Marino Sato	Trident	9	Mechanical	14	
DNF	8	(Estonia) Jüri Vips	Hitech Grand Prix	7	Mechanical	9	
DNF	15	(Brazil) Guilherme Samaia	Charouz Racing System	0	Accident	21	
DSQ	11	(Netherlands) Richard Verschoor	MP Motorsport	30	Technical infringement^{1}	20	
Fastest lap： (New Zealand) Liam Lawson − Hitech Grand Prix − 1:35.000 (lap 14)

Note:

- ^1 – Richard Verschoor originally finished seventh, but was later disqualified after it was found that the combined weight of his MP Motorsport car, including the driver wearing his complete racing apparel, was below the minimum weight specified in Article 5.a of the Technical Regulations.

== Standings after the event ==
Drivers' Championship standings

	Pos.	Driver	Points
	1	(Australia) Oscar Piastri	149
	2	(China) Guanyu Zhou	134
	3	(Russia) Robert Shwartzman	113
	4	(United Kingdom) Dan Ticktum	104
1	5	(France) Théo Pourchaire	94

Teams' Championship standings

Pos.	Team	Points
1	(Italy) Prema Racing	262
2	(United Kingdom) UNI-Virtuosi Racing	193
3	(United Kingdom) Carlin	185
4	(United Kingdom) Hitech Grand Prix	162
5	(France) ART Grand Prix	133

- Note: Only the top five positions are included for both sets of standings.

== See also ==
- 2021 Italian Grand Prix

Previous round: 2021 Silverstone FIA Formula 2 round	FIA Formula 2 Championship; 2021 season	Next round: 2021 Sochi Formula 2 round
Previous round: 2020 Monza Formula 2 round	Monza Formula 2 round	Next round: 2022 Monza Formula 2 round
