= 2015 Masters of Formula 3 =

Race details
Date	20 September 2015
Official name	Masters of Formula 3
Location	Circuit Park Zandvoort, Netherlands
Course	4.307 km (2.676 mi)
Distance	Qualifying Race; 12 laps, 51.684 km (32.115 mi); Main Race; 25 laps, 107.675 km (66.906 mi)
- Qualifying Race

Pole
Driver	(Brazil) Sérgio Sette Câmara	Motopark
Time	1:31.281

Fastest Lap
Driver	(Italy) Antonio Giovinazzi	Jagonya Ayam with Carlin
Time	1:32.396 (on lap 4 of 12)

Podium
First	(Italy) Antonio Giovinazzi	Jagonya Ayam with Carlin
Second	(Germany) Markus Pommer	Motopark
Third	(Brazil) Sérgio Sette Câmara	Motopark
- Main Race

Pole
Driver	(Italy) Antonio Giovinazzi	Jagonya Ayam with Carlin

Fastest Lap
Driver	(Italy) Antonio Giovinazzi	Jagonya Ayam with Carlin
Time	1:32.009 (on lap 2 of 25)

Podium
First	(Italy) Antonio Giovinazzi	Jagonya Ayam with Carlin
Second	(United Kingdom) George Russell	Carlin
Third	(Brazil) Sérgio Sette Câmara	Motopark

The 2015 Masters of Formula 3 was the 25th edition of the Masters of Formula 3 event, a non-championship race for cars that conform to Formula Three regulations. The event was held on 20 September 2015 at Circuit Park Zandvoort, in Zandvoort, North Holland; it was the 23rd time that the circuit held the event.

For the first time since 1999, a qualification race was held alongside the main race but unlike previous years – where the qualification race eliminated drivers from the main race if they finished below a required position – all drivers contested the main Masters race itself.

Jagonya Ayam with Carlin driver Antonio Giovinazzi qualified second for the qualifying race, but after pole-sitter Sérgio Sette Câmara (Motopark) bogged down at the start, Giovinazzi moved into the lead and ultimately won the race by almost nine seconds ahead of another Motopark driver, Markus Pommer in second place. Sette Câmara completed the podium for the race. In the main Masters race, Giovinazzi moved clear at the start, and won the race by a similar margin to what he had done the previous day. As a result, Giovinazzi became the first Italian driver to win the event, and took his team's first win in the race since Takuma Sato in 2001. George Russell completed a 1–2 for Carlin after moving ahead of Pommer and Sette Câmara at the start, while Sette Câmara once again completed the podium.

== Drivers and teams ==
All teams used Dallara chassis, model listed:

Team	No.	Driver	Chassis	Engine	Main series
(Germany) Motopark	1	(Germany) Markus Pommer	F315	Volkswagen	2015 European Formula 3 season
(Germany) Motopark	2	(Brazil) Sérgio Sette Câmara	F314	Volkswagen	2015 European Formula 3 season
(Germany) Motopark	3	(United Kingdom) Sam MacLeod	F315	Volkswagen	2015 European Formula 3 season
(Germany) Motopark	4	(Malaysia) Nabil Jeffri	F314	Volkswagen	2015 European Formula 3 season
(Germany) Motopark	5	(India) Mahaveer Raghunathan	F315	Volkswagen	2015 European Formula 3 season
(United Kingdom) Jagonya Ayam with Carlin	7	(Italy) Antonio Giovinazzi	F315	Volkswagen	2015 European Formula 3 season
(United Kingdom) Jagonya Ayam with Carlin	11	(United States) Ryan Tveter	F312	Volkswagen	2015 European Formula 3 season
(United Kingdom) Carlin	8	(United Kingdom) George Russell	F312	Volkswagen	2015 European Formula 3 season
(United Kingdom) Carlin	9	(United Kingdom) Callum Ilott	F312	Volkswagen	2015 European Formula 3 season
(Netherlands) Van Amersfoort Racing	15	(Italy) Alessio Lorandi	F312	Volkswagen	2015 European Formula 3 season
(Netherlands) Van Amersfoort Racing	16	(India) Arjun Maini	F312	Volkswagen	2015 European Formula 3 season
(Switzerland) Jo Zeller Racing	17	(Puerto Rico) Félix Serrallés	F312	Mercedes	2015 Indy Lights season
(United Kingdom) Fortec Motorsports	21	(China) Zhi Cong Li	F312	Mercedes	2015 European Formula 3 season
(United Kingdom) Fortec Motorsports	22	(Brazil) Pietro Fittipaldi	F315	Mercedes	2015 European Formula 3 season
(United Kingdom) Team West-Tec	24	(South Africa) Raoul Hyman	F314	Mercedes	2015 European Formula 3 season
(United Kingdom) Team West-Tec	25	(Israel) Yarin Stern	F312	Mercedes	2015 Euroformula Open season
(United Kingdom) ThreeBond with T-Sport	26	(Norway) Dennis Olsen	F312	Tomei	2015 Eurocup Formula Renault 2.0 season
(United Kingdom) ThreeBond with T-Sport	27	(Ecuador) Julio Moreno	F312	NBE	2015 European Formula 3 season

== Classification ==
=== Qualifying ===
Pos	No	Driver	Team	Time
1	2	(Brazil) Sérgio Sette Câmara	Motopark	1:31.281
2	7	(Italy) Antonio Giovinazzi	Jagonya Ayam with Carlin	1:31.343
3	1	(Germany) Markus Pommer	Motopark	1:31.414
4	8	(United Kingdom) George Russell	Carlin	1:31.641
5	15	(Italy) Alessio Lorandi	Van Amersfoort Racing	1:31.690
6	16	(India) Arjun Maini	Van Amersfoort Racing	1:31.803
7	3	(United Kingdom) Sam MacLeod	Motopark	1:31.951
8	4	(Malaysia) Nabil Jeffri	Motopark	1:32.041
9	9	(United Kingdom) Callum Ilott	Carlin	1:32.049
10	24	(South Africa) Raoul Hyman	Team West-Tec	1:32.050
11	11	(United States) Ryan Tveter	Jagonya Ayam with Carlin	1:32.146
12	22	(Brazil) Pietro Fittipaldi	Fortec Motorsports	1:32.404
13	17	(Puerto Rico) Félix Serrallés	Jo Zeller Racing	1:32.421
14	26	(Norway) Dennis Olsen	Threebond with T-Sport	1:32.561
15	27	(Ecuador) Julio Moreno	Threebond with T-Sport	1:32.756
16	25	(Israel) Yarin Stern	Team West-Tec	1:33.002
17	5	(India) Mahaveer Raghunathan	Motopark	1:33.199
18	21	(China) Zhi Cong Li	Fortec Motorsports	1:33.472

=== Qualifying Race ===
Pos	No.	Driver	Team	Laps	Time/Retired	Grid
1	7	(Italy) Antonio Giovinazzi	Jagonya Ayam with Carlin	12	18:39.670	2
2	1	(Germany) Markus Pommer	Motopark	12	+8.803	3
3	2	(Brazil) Sérgio Sette Câmara	Motopark	12	+9.230	1
4	8	(United Kingdom) George Russell	Carlin	12	+10.096	4
5	3	(United Kingdom) Sam MacLeod	Motopark	12	+11.665	7
6	4	(Malaysia) Nabil Jeffri	Motopark	12	+12.127	8
7	15	(Italy) Alessio Lorandi	Van Amersfoort Racing	12	+14.121	5
8	16	(India) Arjun Maini	Van Amersfoort Racing	12	+14.671	6
9	11	(United States) Ryan Tveter	Jagonya Ayam with Carlin	12	+17.779	11
10	17	(Puerto Rico) Félix Serrallés	Jo Zeller Racing	12	+18.407	13
11	27	(Ecuador) Julio Moreno	Threebond with T-Sport	12	+21.084	15
12	22	(Brazil) Pietro Fittipaldi	Fortec Motorsports	12	+25.107	12
13	26	(Norway) Dennis Olsen	Threebond with T-Sport	12	+25.628	14
14	9	(United Kingdom) Callum Ilott	Carlin	12	+26.081	9
15	25	(Israel) Yarin Stern	Team West-Tec	12	+27.750	16
16	21	(China) Zhi Cong Li	Fortec Motorsports	12	+30.171	18
17	5	(India) Mahaveer Raghunathan	Motopark	11	+1 Lap	17
Ret	24	(South Africa) Raoul Hyman	Team West-Tec	3	Retired	10
Fastest lap: Antonio Giovinazzi, 1:32.396, 167.812 km/h (104.274 mph) on lap 4

=== Race ===
Pos	No.	Driver	Team	Laps	Time	Grid
1	7	(Italy) Antonio Giovinazzi	Jagonya Ayam with Carlin	25	38:51.164	1
2	8	(United Kingdom) George Russell	Carlin	25	+8.427	4
3	2	(Brazil) Sérgio Sette Câmara	Motopark	25	+11.577	3
4	3	(United Kingdom) Sam MacLeod	Motopark	25	+14.947	5
5	4	(Malaysia) Nabil Jeffri	Motopark	25	+16.641	6
6	16	(India) Arjun Maini	Van Amersfoort Racing	25	+16.783	8
7	11	(United States) Ryan Tveter	Jagonya Ayam with Carlin	25	+21.528	9
8	9	(United Kingdom) Callum Ilott	Carlin	25	+22.430	14
9	15	(Italy) Alessio Lorandi	Van Amersfoort Racing	25	+22.897	7
10	27	(Ecuador) Julio Moreno	Threebond with T-Sport	25	+31.905	11
11	26	(Norway) Dennis Olsen	Threebond with T-Sport	25	+32.380	13
12	17	(Puerto Rico) Félix Serrallés	Jo Zeller Racing	25	+35.831	10
13	22	(Brazil) Pietro Fittipaldi	Fortec Motorsports	25	+36.272	12
14	25	(Israel) Yarin Stern	Team West-Tec	25	+36.657	15
15	24	(South Africa) Raoul Hyman	Team West-Tec	25	+38.768	18
16	21	(China) Zhi Cong Li	Fortec Motorsports	25	+49.151	16
17	5	(India) Mahaveer Raghunathan	Motopark	25	+55.079	17
18	1	(Germany) Markus Pommer	Motopark	24	+1 Lap	2
Fastest lap: Antonio Giovinazzi, 1:32.009, 168.518 km/h (104.712 mph) on lap 2
