= Sérgio Sette Câmara =

Brazilian racing driver (born 1998)

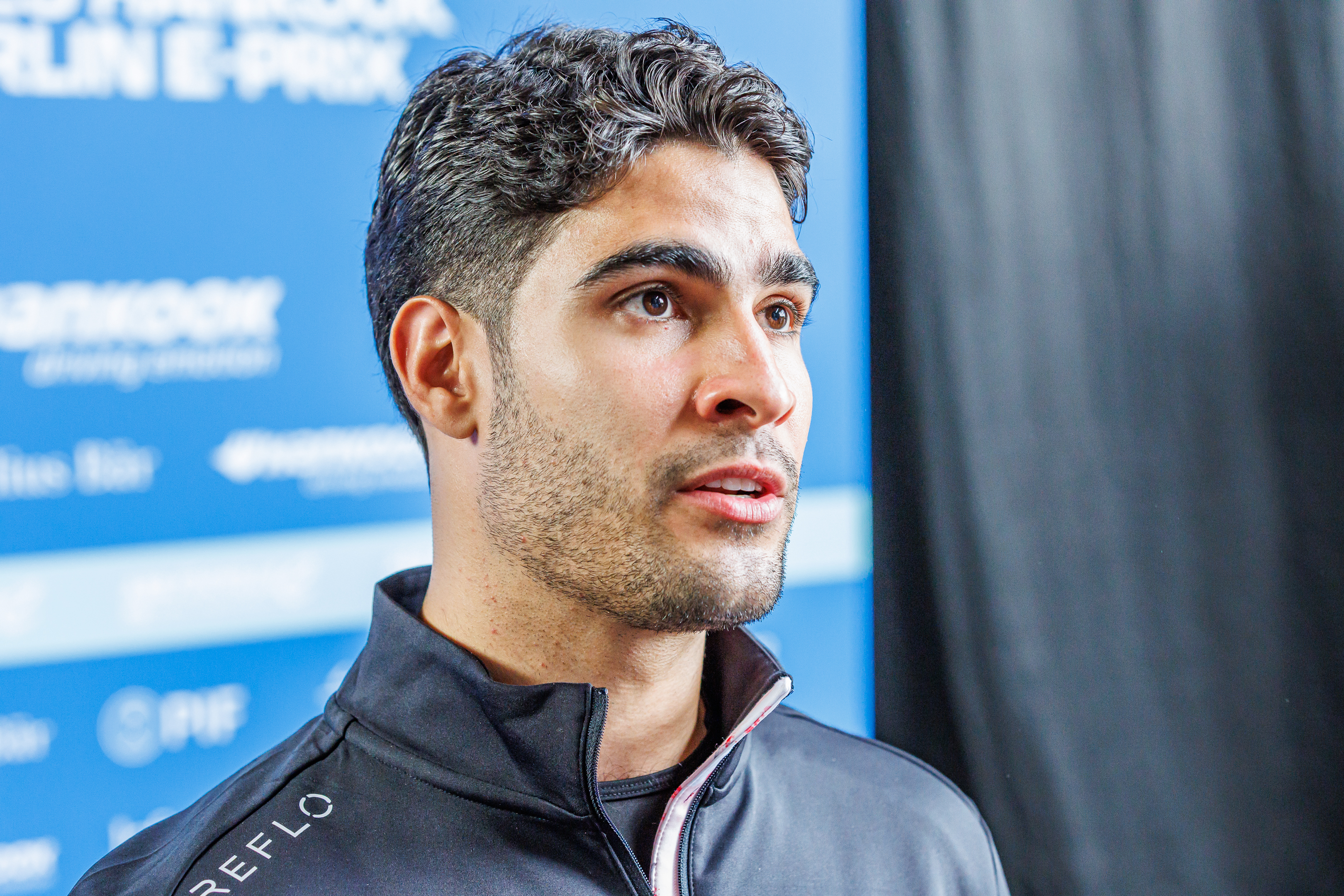
- Sette Câmara at the 2025 Berlin ePrix
- Nationality: (Brazil) Brazilian
- Born: Sérgio Santos Sette Câmara Filho; 23 May 1998 (age 28) Belo Horizonte, Minas Gerais, Brazil

European Le Mans Series career
- Debut season: 2025
- Current team: Nielsen Racing
- Categorisation: FIA Gold
- Car number: 27
- Starts: 6 (6 entries)
- Championships: 0
- Wins: 1
- Poles: 0
- Fastest laps: 1
- Best finish: 8th in 2025

Formula E career
- Debut season: 2019–20
- Car number: 17
- Former teams: Dragon / Penske Autosport, ERT Formula E Team, Nissan
- Starts: 62
- Championships: 0
- Wins: 0
- Poles: 0
- Fastest laps: 0
- Best finish: 20th in 2021–22
- Finished last season: 22nd (2 pts)

Previous series
- 2017–19 2014–16 2015 2014: FIA Formula 2 Championship; FIA European Formula 3 Championship; Toyota Racing Series; Brazilian Formula 3

Sérgio Santos Sette Câmara Filho (born 23 May 1998) is a Brazilian racing driver who currently competes in the 2025 European Le Mans Series with Nielsen Racing. He previously competed in Formula E, having previously raced for Dragon / Penske and ERT Formula E Team. Sette Câmara was part of the Red Bull Junior Team from 2015 to 2017, then again in 2020. In that time, he signed with the McLaren Driver Development Programme in late 2018 to take part in the 2019 season as a development driver.

== Career ==
=== 2014 ===
After he turned sixteen, Sette Câmara was legally able to race in the national F3 championship (Class A) in Brazil. He made his debut at the fourth round at Interlagos. Although he could not quite match up to teammate Pedro Piquet, he finished the year with a strong seventh.

Sette Câmara also made his European F3 debut at the second-last round at Imola, driving for EuroInternational. Driving as a guest driver and ineligible for championship points, Sette Câmara finished 14th, 20th, and 21st respectively in the three races over the weekend.

=== 2015 ===
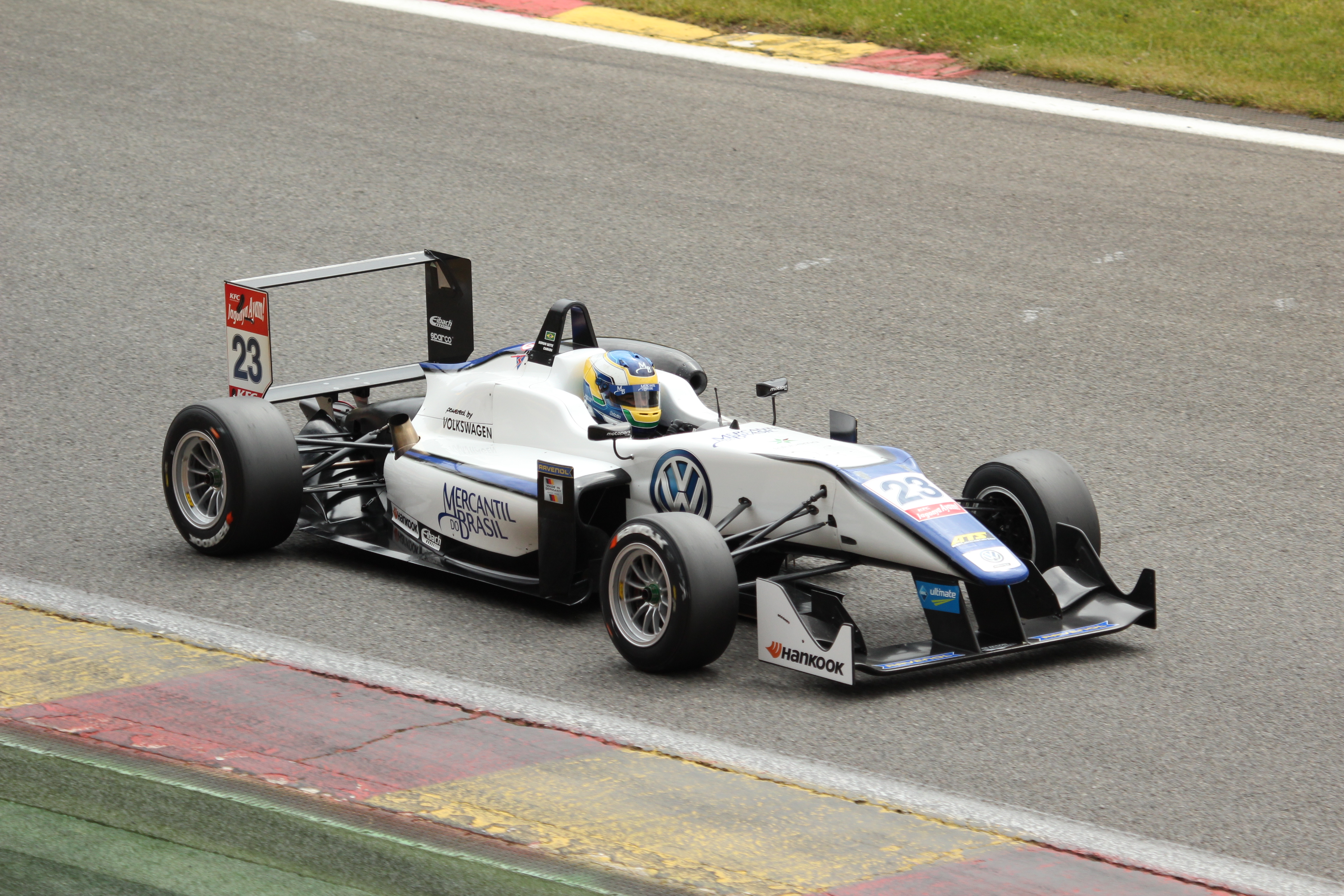
Sette Câmara driving at Spa-Francorchamps during the 2015 FIA Formula 3 European Championship.

After a one-off appearance that year, Sette Câmara made his full-time debut for the 2015 season, driving for Motopark. After a rather disappointing start to the season, his luck turned for the better at Spa where he achieved his first podium in Europe where he finished third. After that race, Sette Câmara went on to score more consistently than not while achieving another third place at Red Bull Ring and went on to finish 14th in the championship with 57.5 points next to his name.

==== Masters of Formula 3 ====
The annual meeting at Zandvoort for the Masters of F3 event was a successful one for Sette Câmara, bagging a pole position for the qualification race. In that race, he finished in third place and also finished third in the main race.

==== Macau Grand Prix ====
Another annual meeting for Formula 3 drivers, this time at Macau, a circuit Sette Câmara had not competed on before. His weekend started well by qualifying seventh, an impressive result for a rookie. In the qualification race, he improved one position to finish a respectable sixth place. In the main race, he struck trouble before finishing 22nd, last of the runners and two minutes off eventual winner Felix Rosenqvist. Despite the disappointing result, Sette Câmara recorded the fastest lap of the race which not only was over 1.5 seconds faster than his own fastest qualifying lap, but it is now also the outright lap record for the Macau GP circuit.

==== Toyota Racing Series ====
Sette Câmara made his Toyota Racing Series debut in 2015 after replacing Dzhon Simonyan at Taupo. He ended the season with 199 points and placed 20th overall.

=== 2016 ===
Returning with Motopark for a second season, now part of the Red Bull Junior Team, the 2016 season for Sette Câmara started off with a tricky weekend at Circuit Paul Ricard when he was taken out by his teammate at the first corner in race 1. But from Hungaroring onwards, Sette Câmara started to prove that he was a genuine competitor on the track by performing some top quality overtaking maneuvers and consistently finishing in the 'points paying positions' including podiums at Pau and Red Bull Ring. Unfortunately, the second half of the season was less than lucky for Sette Câmara: he had many high grid position placings, including a pole position, taken away from him due to grid penalties and suffered other problems, including a drive-through penalty whilst running in 2nd place at Hockenheim. He finished 11th in the championship at the season's end but that did not justify the pace he had all year.

==== Masters of Formula 3 ====
Like last year's event, Sette Câmara enjoyed success at the Zandvoort event. After qualifying seventh for the qualification race, he ended finishing fifth in that race and then in the main race, Sette Câmara finished third once again to top off a successful outing.

==== Macau Grand Prix ====
Returning after a record-breaking race weekend for him in last year's event, Sette Câmara came into the event with Carlin, a team he had never raced with previously. With past winner Antonio Felix da Costa and rising stars Jake Hughes and Lando Norris as his teammates, Sette Câmara was not going to have it easy. He showed his strong form by qualifying in fourth place, just one place behind da Costa. In the qualification race, Sette Câmara made up one place in the race to finish third behind da Costa and former Red Bull Junior Callum Ilott. For the main race, Sette Câmara held the lead for half of the race in strong fashion until Nikita Mazepin crashed and brought out the safety car. Once the safety car came in, he was immediately pressured by da Costa and lost the lead in an epic duel between them and Felix Rosenqvist, reigning and two-time winner of this event, also snuck by Sette Câmara after putting extreme pressure on and Sette Câmara held onto 3rd place at the end of the race to take a podium in one of the most prestigious events in world motorsport, finishing behind now two-time winner da Costa and Rosenqvist.

=== 2017 ===
==== FIA Formula 2 Championship ====
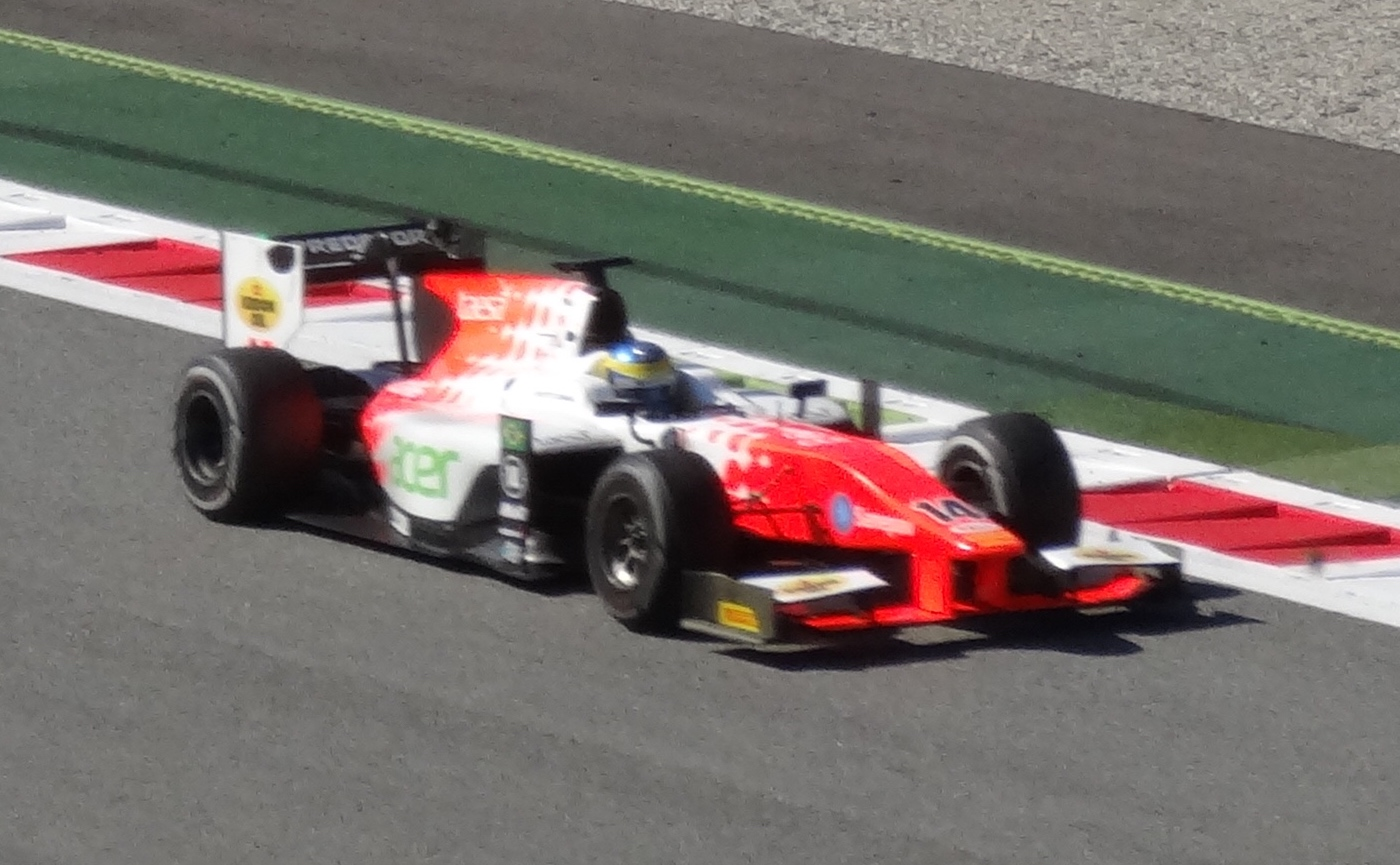
Sette Câmara during the 2017 Monza Formula 2 round

In November 2016, Câmara was confirmed to be stepping up to FIA Formula 2 Championship with MP Motorsport for the 2017 season.

Arriving at Bahrain for Round 1 of the new era of Formula 2, Sette Câmara had a challenge on his hands as he not only had to prove he can match experienced teammate Jordan King, but he also had to prove that being the youngest driver on the grid was not going to hold him back, and after qualifying, he proved he can be quick from the get go as he qualified an impressive tenth for his first ever race and qualified one place ahead of his teammate in the process. Race 1 proved to be the real challenge however as tyre degradation played a massive role in the outcome of the race, but Sette Câmara held on nicely and took a fine 12th place at the end but got relegated to 13th after a time penalty for forcing Campos driver Ralph Boschung off the track. Race 2 did not end up too much better for Sette Câmara, as a puncture on lap 1 forced him into the pits for a tyre change and he did not help his own cause by stalling in the pits either. Eager to prove his worth after a major setback, Sette Câmara went out and while he was too far back from the rest of the field, he was lapping times quicker than most. By the end, he finished a miserable 18th but set the fastest lap of the race and was the only driver to lap a 1: 43-second lap but unfortunately did not get the two points for the fastest lap as he failed to finish inside the top-ten.

Unfortunately for Sette Câmara, points did not get earned at either Spain or Monaco. Struggling for genuine pace in the feature race before being forced off the track by Johnny Cecotto in the sprint race at Spain and being to told to stop crying by his own team over the radio and retiring with a suspension failure whilst in the points in the feature race and being stuck at the back of the field due to extremely difficult overtaking opportunities in the sprint race at Monaco were his problems.

Baku, Austria, Silverstone and Hungaroring were also quiet and scoreless runs for Sette Câmara but could have had a breakthrough points score in Austria after qualifying second before being disqualified and sent to the back of the grid for having an irregular fuel sample in the car and to sum up his season going into the summer break, scoring 0 points from 14 races was certainly not what Sette Câmara planned to achieve.

After the summer break, Sette Câmara returned to the Spa circuit where he had much success in the past. After qualifying 11th for the feature race in a session that was hit by heavy rain, Sette Câmara wasted no time in making his way up inside the top-ten. He finished eighth, his first points finish of the season, before being promoted to sixth after the disqualifications of Charles Leclerc and Oliver Rowland. Starting third for the sprint race, Sette Câmara made the best start of the season as he managed to take the lead out of turn 1. He had tough competition behind him, but held the lead until the end. This was his first race win not only in Formula 2, but in car racing in general, as he had not won a race since his karting days.

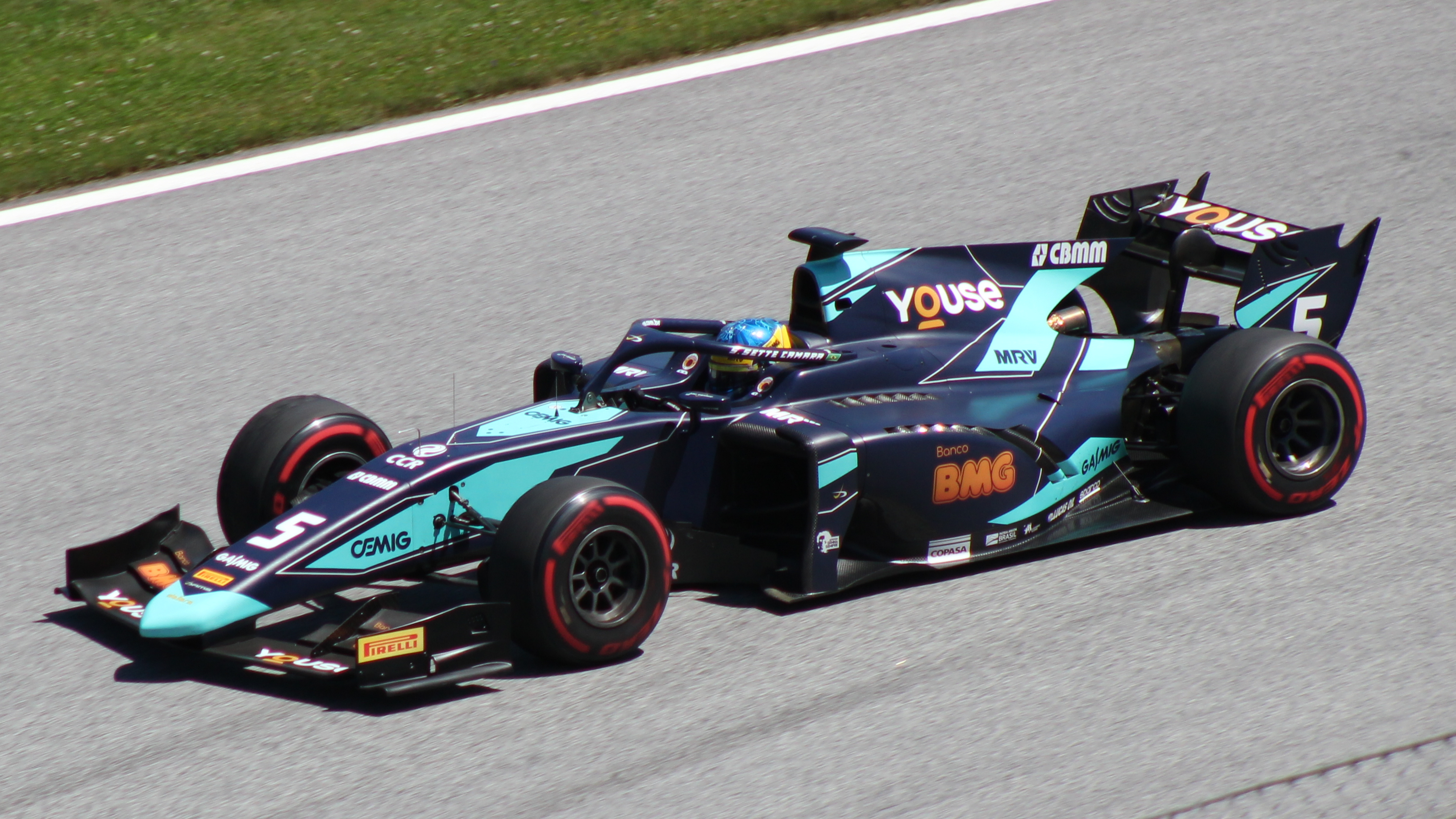
Sette Câmara at the Red Bull Ring round of the 2019 FIA Formula 2 Championship. He would win the sprint race.

One week later at Monza, Sette Câmara came in with good momentum after his first win and while qualifying 11th was not the best start, his two races were top class once again. Having a quiet race up until the frantic final laps of the feature race, he finished sixth after all of the penalties were set in stone and once again started 3rd for the sprint race, where once again he capitalized on his improving race pace and captured 2nd place after losing the lead to the fast charging Luca Ghiotto and held his own for another deserving podium.

For the penultimate round at Jerez, which was a stand-alone event for F2 and GP3 to make up for the German Grand Prix not being able to host an event that year, Sette Câmara got up to speed quite quickly despite the circuit being unfamiliar, and was comfortably inside the top-ten for the majority of the weekend before a string of bad luck which led to bad timing leaving him with tenth and 14th in the feature and sprint races respectively. He had better luck at Yas Marina, Abu Dhabi where he had a solid weekend that resulted in ninth and eighth in the feature and sprint races respectively to close off his rookie year in Formula 2.

==== Macau Grand Prix ====
Returning for his third attempt, Sette Câmara had a lot more of a challenge on his plate due to being out of a Formula 3 car all year while racing in Formula 2. He was the fastest in FP1 but that involved hitting the wall and in qualifying, his best lap was ruined by making contact with the wall and he had to settle for ninth. That did not hamper his progress through the qualification race as he made a rapid start, making his way to fifth by the end of lap 1 before reaching third and pressuring Joel Eriksson for second. In the end, Eriksson held his own and Sette Câmara finished an impressive third from ninth on the grid.

The main race, however, was action-packed and entertaining, featuring hard racing and daring overtakes as well as a number of incidents. For Sette Câmara however, it was a fairytale that quickly turned into his biggest nightmare. After both Joel Eriksson and Callum Ilott ran into trouble, Sette Câmara inherited the lead and held it until the final lap. After firstly being under immense pressure from Maximilian Günther and then the fast charging Ferdinand Habsburg, Sette Câmara looked set to take victory, but he was overtaken around the outside on the final corner on the last lap by Habsburg and both drivers went into the wall after carrying too much speed into the corner. Habsburg managed to make it across the line in a heavily damaged car and finished fourth, but Sette Câmara did not make it to the checkered flag and was classified in 13th place, after having led the majority of the race.

=== 2018 ===
Sette Câmara returned to Formula 2 for the 2018 season and started it off in impressive fashion, finishing second behind Lando Norris in the first feature race of the year in Bahrain. He followed that up with a third place finish in the same weekend's sprint race. He would go on to finish sixth in the championship with a total of eight podium finishes for the year.

== Formula E ==
=== Dragon / Penske Autosport (2020–2022) ===
==== 2019–20 season ====
In February 2020, Sette Câmara, along with former European Formula 3 teammate Joel Eriksson, joined the GEOX Dragon Formula E team as reserve driver and entrant into the March rookie test in Marrakesh. In the test, his efforts saw him set the second fastest time of the day behind Envision Virgin Racing entrant Nick Cassidy. In July 2020, following Brendon Hartley's departure from the outfit, Dragon promoted Sette Câmara to the second race seat for the season finale in Berlin.

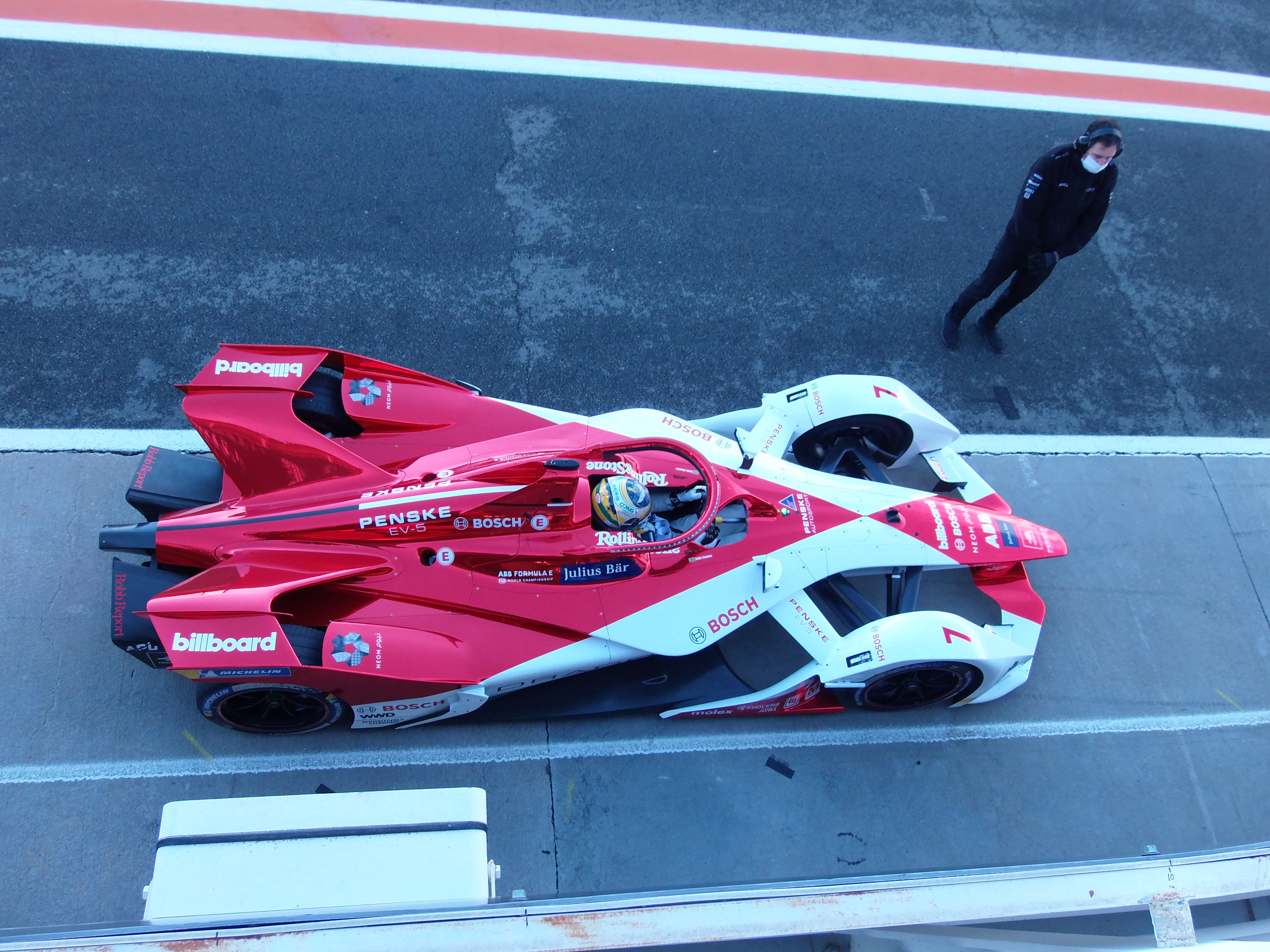
Sette Câmara testing before his first full season of Formula E.

==== 2020–21 season ====
In November, the team confirmed Sette Câmara would join the series full time as part of the 2020–21 line-up. He scored his first points finish in Formula E with a fourth place finish at the Diriyah ePrix. This was Dragon's best finish in Formula E since the 2019 Swiss ePrix. He finished eighth at the London ePrix to take his second points finish of the year and ended up 22nd in the standings.

==== 2021–22 season ====
Sette Câmara was signed by Dragon for the 2021–22 season. Ex-F1 driver Antonio Giovinazzi was signed as his teammate. He finished ninth in the London ePrix, scoring his team's and his only points of the season.

=== NIO 333 Racing / ERT Formula E Team (2023–2024) ===
==== 2022–23 season ====
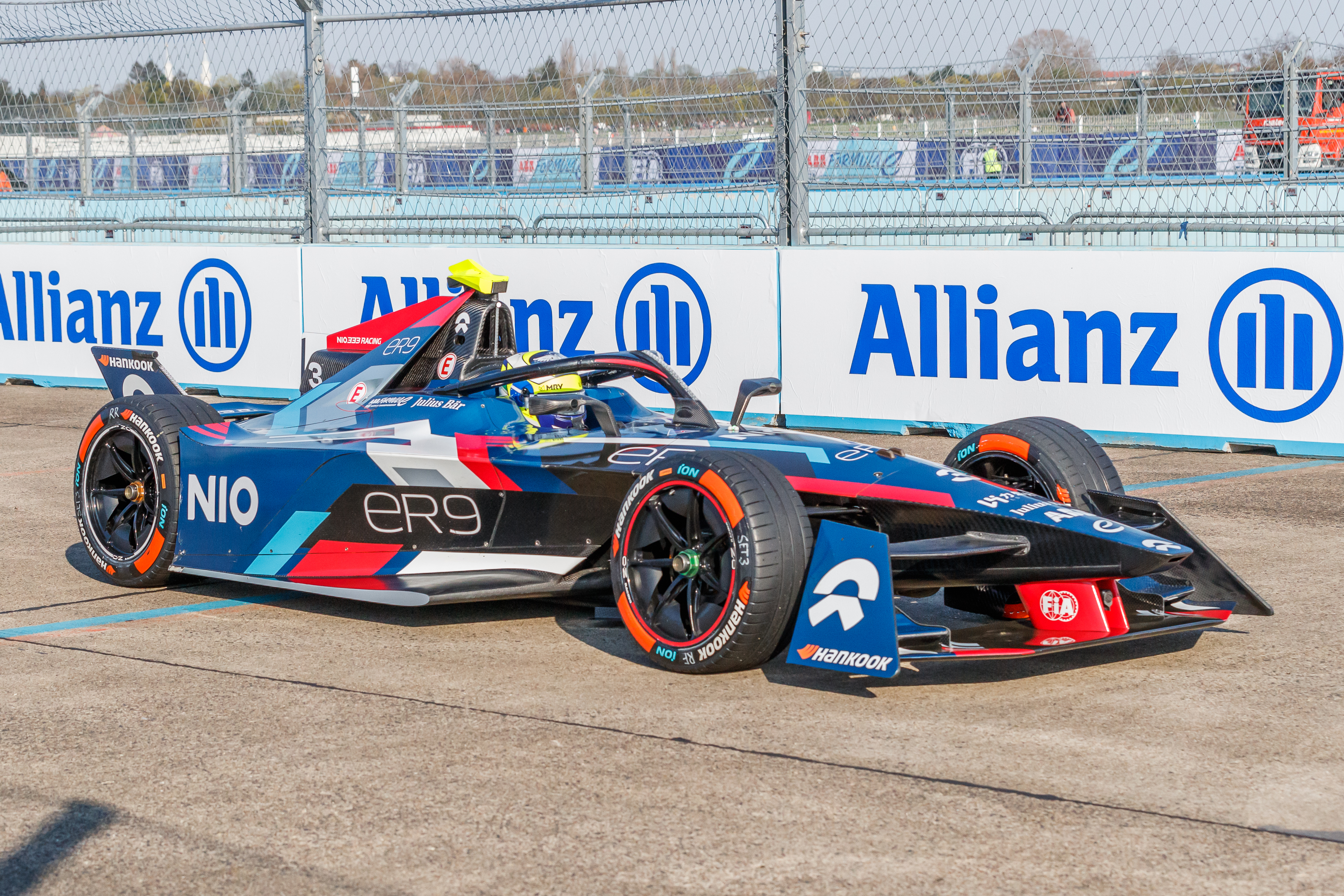
Sette Câmara during the 2023 Berlin ePrix

Sette Câmara switched to NIO 333 FE Team for the 2022–23 season, partnering Dan Ticktum. He would be outscored by his teammate across the year, though he would achieve their outfits best result since 2018 with fifth place in a chaotic Hyderabad ePrix. Sette Câmara also came eighth at the first race in Rome and fifth at the opening round of the London event, though he would later be disqualified as his team failed to obey the race directors' instructions, not changing a broken front wing during a red flag race stoppage. Sette Câmara ended up 20th in the championship, with Ticktum scoring double his amount of points.

==== 2023–24 season ====
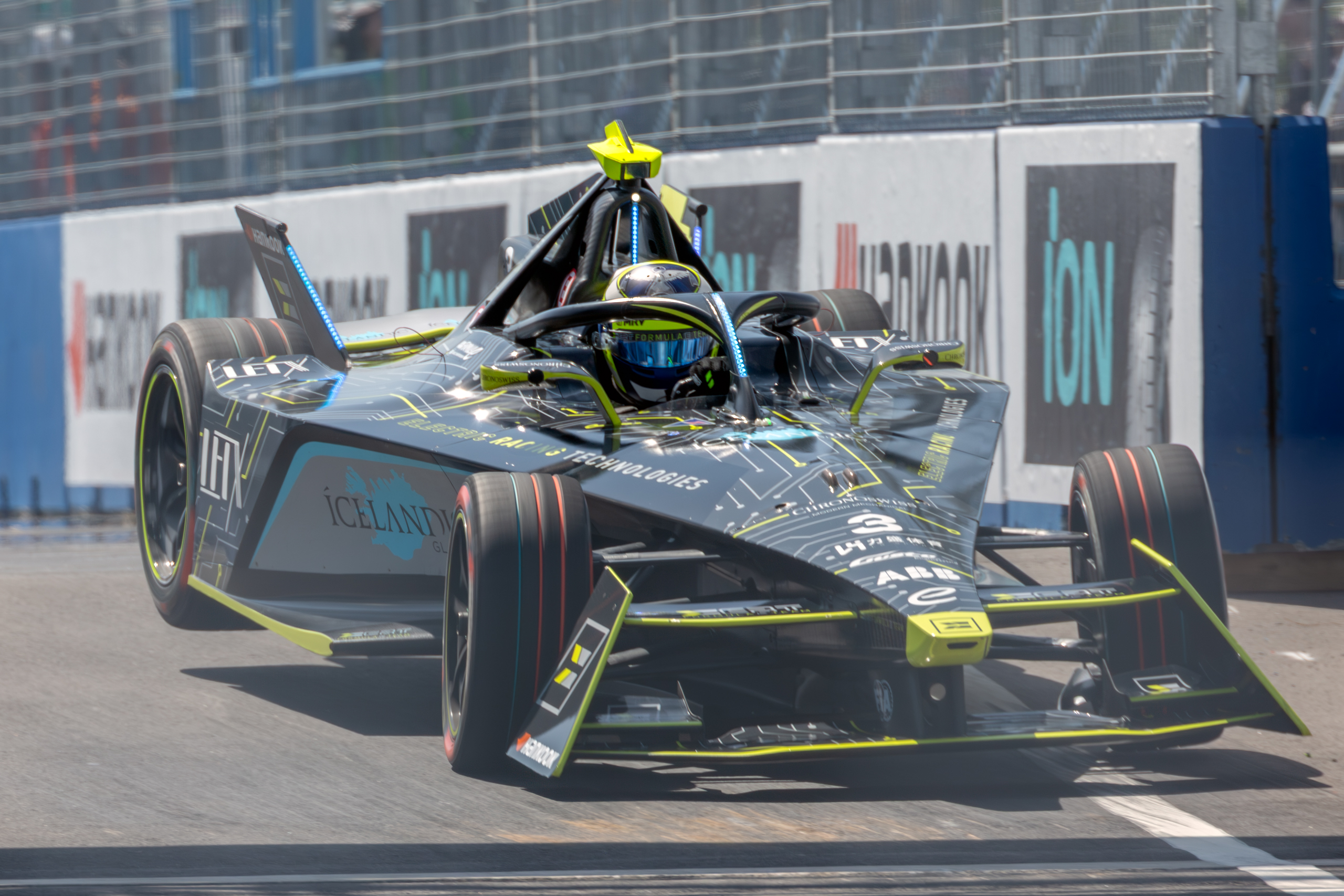
Sette Câmara at the 2024 Tokyo ePrix

In September 2023, the team, which was rebranded as ERT Formula E Team, announced that it would be retaining Sette Câmara and Dan Ticktum for the 2023–24 campaign. Sette Câmara was released from the team at the end of the season, and was replaced by David Beckmann.

=== Nissan (2025) ===
After losing his full-time Formula E drive, Sette Câmara joined Nissan as their reserve and simulator driver for the 2024–25 season. He made his return during the Berlin ePrix subbing in for Norman Nato who would have clashing commitments in the FIA World Endurance Championship.

== Formula One ==
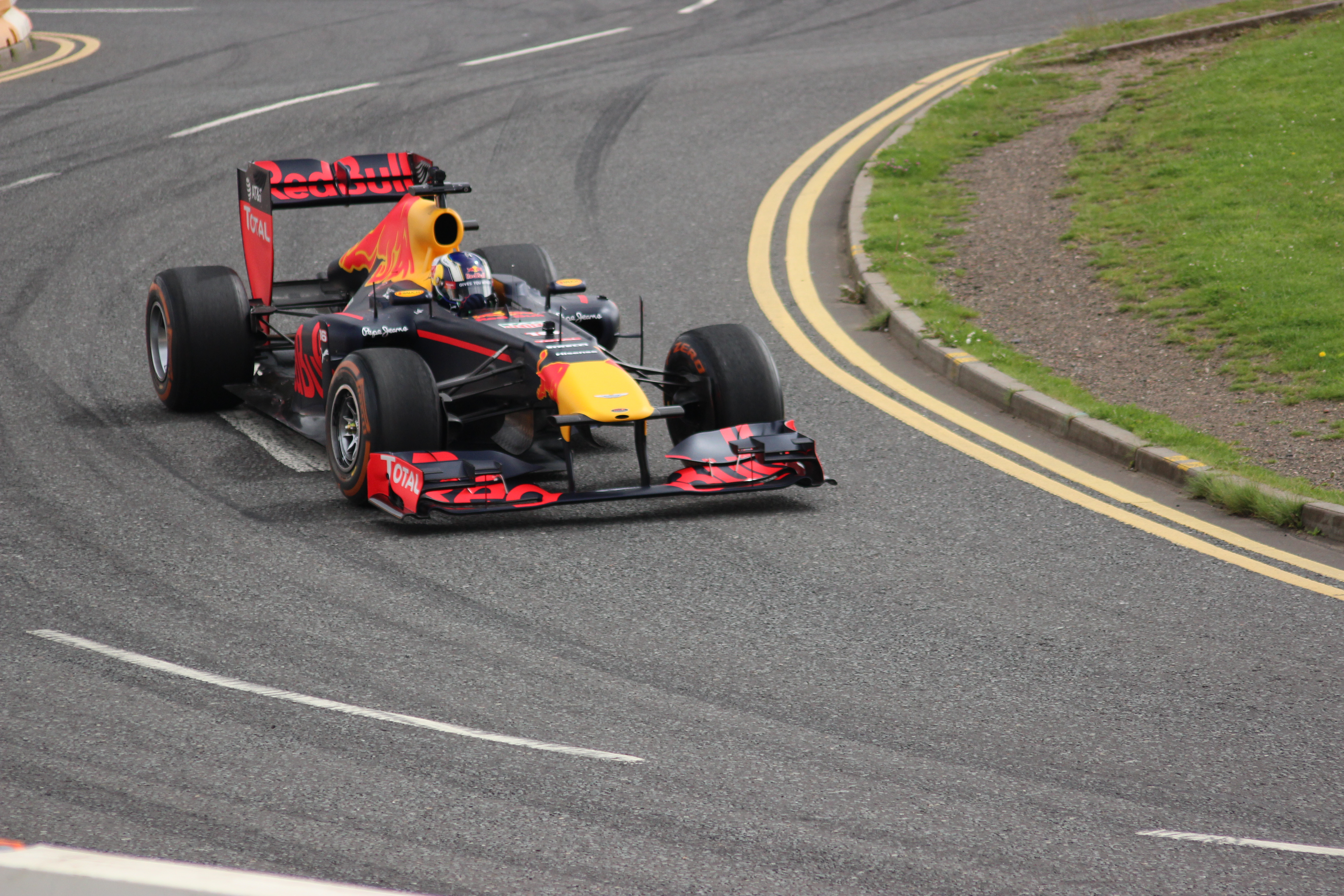
Sette Câmara driving the Red Bull RB7 at the Ignition Festival in Glasgow in 2016

After impressive pace in Formula 3 in 2015, Red Bull signed him to the Red Bull Junior Team. After his first taste of F1 machinery in a demo run at Motorland Aragón, he made his official test debut with Toro Rosso after the British Grand Prix at Silverstone. In the beginning of 2017, Sette Câmara was dropped from the Red Bull Junior Team program. In November 2018, he was signed by McLaren as a 2019 test and development driver and took part in the 2019 Catalunya Young Driver Test, but returned to the Red Bull program in 2020.

== Sportscar racing ==
=== European Le Mans Series ===
==== 2025 ====
Alongside his reserve driver role for Nissan in Formula E, Sette Câmara signed with Nielsen Racing to compete in the 2025 European Le Mans Series alongside co-drivers James Allen and Anthony Wells.

== Karting record ==
=== Karting career summary ===
Season	Series	Team	Position
2011	Super Kart Brasil — Júnior		10th
2011	Copa Brasil de Kart — Júnior Menor		**1st**
2011	Brazilian Kart Championship — Sudam Junior		9th
2011	SKUSA SuperNationals — TaG Junior		11th
2012	Super Kart Brasil — Júnior		7th
2012	SKUSA SuperNationals — TaG Junior	ART Grand Prix America	20th
2012	IAME International Final — X30 Junior		**1st**
2012	WSK Euro Series — KF3		48th
2013	IAME International Final — X30 Junior		9th
2013	WSK Super Master Series — KFJ		30th
2013	CIK-FIA International Super Cup — KFJ		15th
2013	Copa Brasil de Kart — Graduado		**2nd**
2013	CIK-FIA European Championship — KFJ	ART Grand Prix Srl	13th
2013	CIK-FIA World Championship — KFJ		26th
2014	South Garda Winter Cup — KF2		16th
2014	WSK Champions Cup — KF		22nd
2014	CIK-FIA European Championship — KF	Morsicani Racing	49th

=== Complete CIK-FIA Karting European Championship results ===
(key) (Races in bold indicate pole position) (Races in italics indicate fastest lap)

Year	Team	Class	1	2	3	4	5	6	7	8	DC	Points
2013	ART Grand Prix Srl	KFJ	ALC; 7	ORT; 18							13th	9
2014	Morsicani Racing	KF	LAC; QH; 48	LAC; R DNQ	ZUE; QH; 43	ZUE; R DNQ	GEN; QH; WD	GEN; R WD	PFI; QH	PFI; R	49th	0

== Racing record ==
=== Racing career summary ===
Season	Series	Team	Races	Wins	Poles	F/Laps	Podiums	Points	Position
2014	Fórmula 3 Brasil	Cesário F3	10	0	1	2	3	45	7th
2014	FIA Formula 3 European Championship	EuroInternational	3	0	0	0	0	0	NC†
2015	FIA Formula 3 European Championship	Motopark	33	0	0	0	2	57.5	14th
2015	Masters of Formula 3	Motopark	1	0	0	0	1	N/A	**3rd**
2015	Macau Grand Prix	Motopark	1	0	0	1	0	N/A	22nd
2015	Toyota Racing Series	Giles Motorsport	7	0	0	0	0	199	20th
2016	FIA Formula 3 European Championship	Motopark	30	0	0	1	2	117	11th
2016	Masters of Formula 3	Motopark	1	0	0	0	1	N/A	**3rd**
2016	Macau Grand Prix	Carlin	1	0	0	0	1	N/A	**3rd**
2016	Formula One	Scuderia Toro Rosso	Test and Development driver						
2017	FIA Formula 2 Championship	MP Motorsport	22	1	0	1	2	47	12th
2017	Macau Grand Prix	Motopark	1	0	0	0	0	N/A	13th
2018	FIA Formula 2 Championship	Carlin	22	0	1	3	8	164	6th
2019	FIA Formula 2 Championship	DAMS	22	2	2	3	8	204	4th
2019	Formula One	McLaren F1 Team	Test and Development driver						
2019–20	Formula E	GEOX Dragon	6	0	0	0	0	0	27th
2020	Super Formula	Buzz Racing with B-MAX	1	0	1	0	0	3	20th
2020	Formula One	Aston Martin Red Bull Racing	Test driver						
2020	Formula One	Scuderia AlphaTauri Honda	Test driver						
2020–21	Formula E	Dragon / Penske Autosport	15	0	0	0	0	16	22nd
2021	Porsche All-Star Race Brasil	N/A	1	0	0	0	0	N/A	6th
2021–22	Formula E	Dragon / Penske Autosport	15	0	0	0	0	2	20th
2022–23	Formula E	NIO 333 Racing	15	0	0	0	0	14	20th
2023–24	Formula E	ERT Formula E Team	15	0	0	0	0	11	20th
2024	GT World Challenge Europe Endurance Cup	Boutsen VDS	1	0	0	0	0	8	24th
2024–25	Formula E	Nissan Formula E Team	2	0	0	0	0	2	22nd
2025	European Le Mans Series - LMP2 Pro-Am	Nielsen Racing	6	1	0	1	2	58	8th
2025	24H Series - GT3	Comtoyou Racing							
2025	GT World Challenge Europe Endurance Cup	Comtoyou Racing	1	0	0	0	0	0	NC
2025	GT World Challenge Europe Sprint Cup	Comtoyou Racing	2	0	0	0	0	0	NC
2025	GT World Challenge Europe Sprint Cup - Bronze Cup	Comtoyou Racing	2	0	0	0	0	6.5	18th
2025	Le Mans Cup - LMP3 Pro-Am	Inter Europol Competition	2	0	0	0	0	5	26th
2025	Shanghai 8 Hours - GT3	Uno Racing Team						N/A	TBD
2026	Stock Car Pro Series	RCM Motorsport	19	1	0	0	3	581	7th*
2026	European Le Mans Series - LMGT3	Iron Lynx	6	0	0	0	0	18	20th
2026	Le Mans Cup - LMP3	Steller Motorsport	1	0	0	0	0	0	NC†
2026	GT World Challenge Europe Endurance Cup	Tresor Attempto Racing	1	0	0	0	0	0	NC
2026	GT World Challenge Europe Endurance Cup	Comtoyou Racing	1	0	0	0	0	0	NC
2026-27	Asian Le Mans Series - GT3	Craft-Bamboo Iron Lynx							

^{†} As Sette Câmara was a guest driver, he was ineligible to score championship points.
^{*} Season still in progress.

=== Complete Formula 3 Brasil results ===
(key) (Races in bold indicate pole position) (Races in italics indicate fastest lap)

Year	Entrant	1	2	3	4	5	6	7	8	9	10	11	12	13	14	15	16	Pos	Points
2014	Césario F3	TAR; 1	TAR; 2	SCS; 1	SCS; 2	BRA; 1	BRA; 2	INT; 1; 6	INT; 2; 12	CUR1; 1; 6	CUR1; 2; 4	VEL; 1; 7	VEL; 2 Ret	CUR2; 1 Ret	CUR2; 2; 11	**GOI**; **1**; 2	GOI; 2 Ret	7th	45

=== Complete FIA Formula 3 European Championship results ===
(key) (Races in bold indicate pole position, races in italics indicate fastest race lap)

Year	Entrant	Engine	1	2	3	4	5	6	7	8	9	10	11	12	13	14	15	16	17	18	19	20	21	22	23	24	25	26	27	28	29	30	31	32	33	DC	Points
2014	EuroInternational	Mercedes	SIL; 1	SIL; 2	SIL; 3	HOC; 1	HOC; 2	HOC; 3	PAU; 1	PAU; 2	PAU; 3	HUN; 1	HUN; 2	HUN; 3	SPA; 1	SPA; 2	SPA; 3	NOR; 1	NOR; 2	NOR; 3	MSC; 1	MSC; 2	MSC; 3	RBR; 1	RBR; 2	RBR; 3	NÜR; 1	NÜR; 2	NÜR; 3	IMO; 1; 14	IMO; 2; 20	IMO; 3; 21	HOC; 1	HOC; 2	HOC; 3	NC†	0†
2015	Motopark	Volkswagen	SIL; 1; 17	SIL; 2 Ret	SIL; 3; 20	HOC; 1; 17	HOC; 2; 25	HOC; 3; 27	PAU; 1; 14	PAU; 2; 20	PAU; 3; 11	MNZ; 1 Ret	MNZ; 2; 11	MNZ; 3; 22	SPA; 1; 16	SPA; 2; 3	SPA; 3; 22	NOR; 1; 15	NOR; 2; 23	NOR; 3; 19	ZAN; 1 Ret	ZAN; 2; 6	ZAN; 3; 7	RBR; 1; 9	RBR; 2; 19	RBR; 3; 3	ALG; 1; 11	ALG; 2; 13	ALG; 3; 5	NÜR; 1; 11	NÜR; 2; 21	NÜR; 3; 9	HOC; 1; 11	HOC; 2; 7	HOC; 3; 11	14th	57.5
2016	Motopark	Volkswagen	LEC; 1; 16	LEC; 2; 5	LEC; 3; 19	HUN; 1; 7	HUN; 2; 5	HUN; 3; 5	PAU; 1; 8	PAU; 2; 2	PAU; 3 Ret	RBR; 1; 12	RBR; 2; 8	RBR; 3; 4	NOR; 1 Ret	NOR; 2 Ret	NOR; 3; 3	ZAN; 1; 11	ZAN; 2; 17	ZAN; 3; 15	SPA; 1; 15	SPA; 2 Ret	SPA; 3; 15	NÜR; 1; 11	NÜR; 2; 8	NÜR; 3; 8	IMO; 1 Ret	IMO; 2; 15	IMO; 3; 11	HOC; 1; 5	HOC; 2; 14	HOC; 3; 6				11th	117

^{†} As Sette Câmara was a guest driver, he was ineligible to score championship points.

=== Complete Macau Grand Prix results ===
Year	Team	Car	Qualifying	Quali Race	Main race
2015	(Germany) Motopark	Dallara F312	7th	6th	22nd
2016	(United Kingdom) Carlin	Dallara F312	4th	**3rd**	**3rd**
2017	(Germany) Motopark	Dallara F317	9th	**3rd**	13th

=== Complete FIA Formula 2 Championship results ===
(key) (Races in bold indicate pole position) (Races in italics indicate points for the fastest lap of top ten finishers)

Year	Entrant	1	2	3	4	5	6	7	8	9	10	11	12	13	14	15	16	17	18	19	20	21	22	23	24	DC	Points
2017	MP Motorsport	BHR; FEA; 13	BHR; SPR; 18	CAT; FEA; 14	CAT; SPR; 15	MON; FEA; Ret	MON; SPR; 14	BAK; FEA; 13	BAK; SPR; 9	RBR; FEA; 16	RBR; SPR; 10	SIL; FEA; 13	SIL; SPR; 15	HUN; FEA; 16	HUN; SPR; 13	SPA; FEA; 6	SPA; SPR; 1	MNZ; FEA; 6	MNZ; SPR; 2	JER; FEA; 10	JER; SPR; 14	YMC; FEA; 9	YMC; SPR; 8			12th	47
2018	Carlin	BHR; FEA; 2	BHR; SPR; 3	BAK; FEA; 4	BAK; SPR; DSQ	CAT; FEA; 7	CAT; SPR; Ret	MON; FEA; DNS	MON; SPR; DNS	LEC; FEA; 2	LEC; SPR; 6	RBR; FEA; 6	RBR; SPR; 3	SIL; FEA; Ret	SIL; SPR; 17	**HUN**; **FEA**; 7	HUN; SPR; 3	SPA; FEA; 2	SPA; SPR; 9	MNZ; FEA; 7	MNZ; SPR; 3	SOC; FEA; 5	SOC; SPR; 2	YMC; FEA; 16	YMC; SPR; 10	6th	164
2019	DAMS	BHR; FEA; 3	BHR; SPR; 2	BAK; FEA; Ret	BAK; SPR; 6	CAT; FEA; NC	CAT; SPR; 17	MON; FEA; 3	MON; SPR; 6	**LEC**; **FEA**; 2	LEC; SPR; 5	RBR; FEA; 5	RBR; SPR; 1	SIL; FEA; 4	SIL; SPR; 17	HUN; FEA; 5	HUN; SPR; 3	SPA; FEA; C	SPA; SPR; C	MNZ; FEA; 5	MNZ; SPR; Ret	SOC; FEA; 5	SOC; SPR; 6	**YMC**; **FEA**; 1	YMC; SPR; 3	4th	204

=== Complete Formula E results ===
(key) (Races in bold indicate pole position; races in italics indicate fastest lap)

Year	Team	Chassis	Powertrain	1	2	3	4	5	6	7	8	9	10	11	12	13	14	15	16	Pos	Points
2019–20	GEOX Dragon	Spark SRT05e	Penske EV-4	DIR	DIR	SCL	MEX	MRK	BER; DSQ	BER; 17	BER; Ret	BER; 21	BER; 15	BER; 19						27th	0
2020–21	Dragon / Penske Autosport	Spark SRT05e	Penske EV-4	DIR; 20	DIR; 4	RME; 16	RME; 12	VLC; Ret	VLC; 21											22nd	16
2020–21	Dragon / Penske Autosport	Spark SRT05e	Penske EV-5							MCO; 15	PUE; 15	PUE; 16	NYC; 18	NYC; 11	LDN; 17	LDN; 8	BER; 18	BER; 18		22nd	16
2021–22	Dragon / Penske Autosport	Spark SRT05e	Penske EV-5	DRH; 15	DRH; 17	MEX; 20	RME; 15	RME; 12	MCO; 13	BER; 17	BER; 19	JAK; 19	MRK; 20	NYC; DNS	NYC; 17	LDN; NC	LDN; 9	SEO; 12	SEO; 13	20th	2
2022–23	NIO 333 FE Team	Formula E Gen3	NIO 333 ER9	MEX; 16	DRH; 15	DRH; 17	HYD; 5	CAP; 12	SAP; 17	BER; 16	BER; 15	MCO; 14	JAK; 17	JAK; DNS	POR; 16	RME; 8	RME; Ret	LDN; DSQ	LDN; 13	20th	14
2023–24	ERT Formula E Team	Formula E Gen3	ERT X24	MEX; DNS	DRH; 9	DRH; 18	SAP; DSQ	TOK; 10	MIS; 15	MIS; 6	MCO; 19	BER; 16	BER; 13	SIC; 13	SIC; 18	POR; 14	POR; 14	LDN; 12	LDN; 11	20th	11
2024–25	Nissan Formula E Team	Formula E Gen3 Evo	Nissan e-4ORCE 05	SAO	MEX	JED	JED	MIA	MCO	MCO	TKO	TKO	SHA	SHA	JAK	BER; 15	BER; 9	LDN	LDN	22nd	2

=== Complete Super Formula results ===
(key) (Races in bold indicate pole position) (Races in italics indicate fastest lap)

Year	Team	Engine	1	2	3	4	5	6	7	DC	Points
2020	Buzz Racing with B-Max	Honda	MOT	OKA	**SUG**; Ret^{1}	AUT	SUZ	SUZ	FUJ	20th	3

=== Complete European Le Mans Series results ===
(key) (Races in bold indicate pole position; results in italics indicate fastest lap)

Year	Entrant	Class	Chassis	Engine	1	2	3	4	5	6	Rank	Points
2025	Nielsen Racing	LMP2 Pro-Am	Oreca 07	Gibson GK428 4.2 L V8	CAT; 7	LEC; 1	IMO; 8	SPA; Ret	SIL; 6	ALG; 3	8th	58
2026	Iron Lynx	LMGT3	Mercedes-AMG GT3 Evo	Mercedes-AMG M159 6.2 L V8	CAT; 7	LEC; 6	IMO; Ret	SPA; 8	SIL; Ret	ALG; Ret	20th	18

^{*} Season still in progress.

=== Complete Le Mans Cup results ===
(key) (Races in bold indicate pole position; results in italics indicate fastest lap)

Year	Entrant	Class	Chassis	1	2	3	4	5	6	7	Rank	Points
2025	Inter Europol Competition	LMP3 Pro-Am	Ligier JS P325	CAT	LEC	LMS; 1; 10	LMS; 2; 7	SPA	SIL	ALG	26th	5
2026	Steller Motorsport	LMP3 Pro-Am	Duqueine D09	CAT	LEC	LMS; 8	SPA	SIL	ALG		NC	0

=== Complete GT World Challenge Europe results ===
==== GT World Challenge Europe Endurance Cup ====
(key) (Races in bold indicate pole position) (Races in italics indicate fastest lap)

Year	Team	Car	Class	1	2	3	4	5	6	7	Pos.	Points
2024	Boutsen VDS	Mercedes-AMG GT3 Evo	Pro	LEC	SPA; 6H	SPA; 12H	SPA; 24H	NÜR	MNZ; 6	JED	24th	8
2025	Comtoyou Racing	Aston Martin Vantage AMR GT3 Evo	Pro-Am	LEC	MNZ	SPA; 6H; 67†	SPA; 12H; 67†	SPA; 24H; Ret	NÜR	CAT	NC	0
2026	Tresor Attempto Racing	Audi R8 LMS Evo II	Bronze	LEC	MNZ	SPA; 6H; 54	SPA; 12H; 56†	SPA; 24H; Ret			40th	1
2026	Comtoyou Racing	Aston Martin Vantage AMR GT3 Evo	Bronze						NÜR; 45	ALG	40th	1

==== GT World Challenge Europe Sprint Cup ====
(key) (Races in bold indicate pole position) (Races in italics indicate fastest lap)

Year	Team	Car	Class	1	2	3	4	5	6	7	8	Pos.	Points
2025	Comtoyou Racing	Aston Martin Vantage AMR GT3 Evo	Bronze	ZAN; 1	ZAN; 2	MIS; 1; 35	MIS; 2; 33	MAG; 1	MAG; 2	VAL; 1	VAL; 2	18th	6.5

=== Complete Stock Car Pro Series results ===
Year	Team	Car	1	2	3	4	5	6	7	8	9	10	11	12	13	14	15	16	17	18	19	20	21	22	Rank	Points
2026	RCM Motorsport	Mitsubishi Eclipse Cross	CRS; 1; 6	CRS; 2; 10	CAS; 1; 15	CAS; 2; 7	INT; 1; 22	INT; 2; 14	GOI; 1; 12	GOI; 2; 2	CUI; 1; 3	CUI; 2; 5	VCA; 1; 8	VCA; 2; 10	SCZ; 1; 19	SCZ; 2; 17	CRS; 1; 11	CRS; 2; 26	BRA; 1; 1	CAS; 1; 17	CAS; 2; 21	VEL; 1	INT; 1	INT; 2	7th*	581*

^{*} Season still in progress.
