= Julio Moreno (racing driver) =

Ecuadorian racing driver (born 1995)

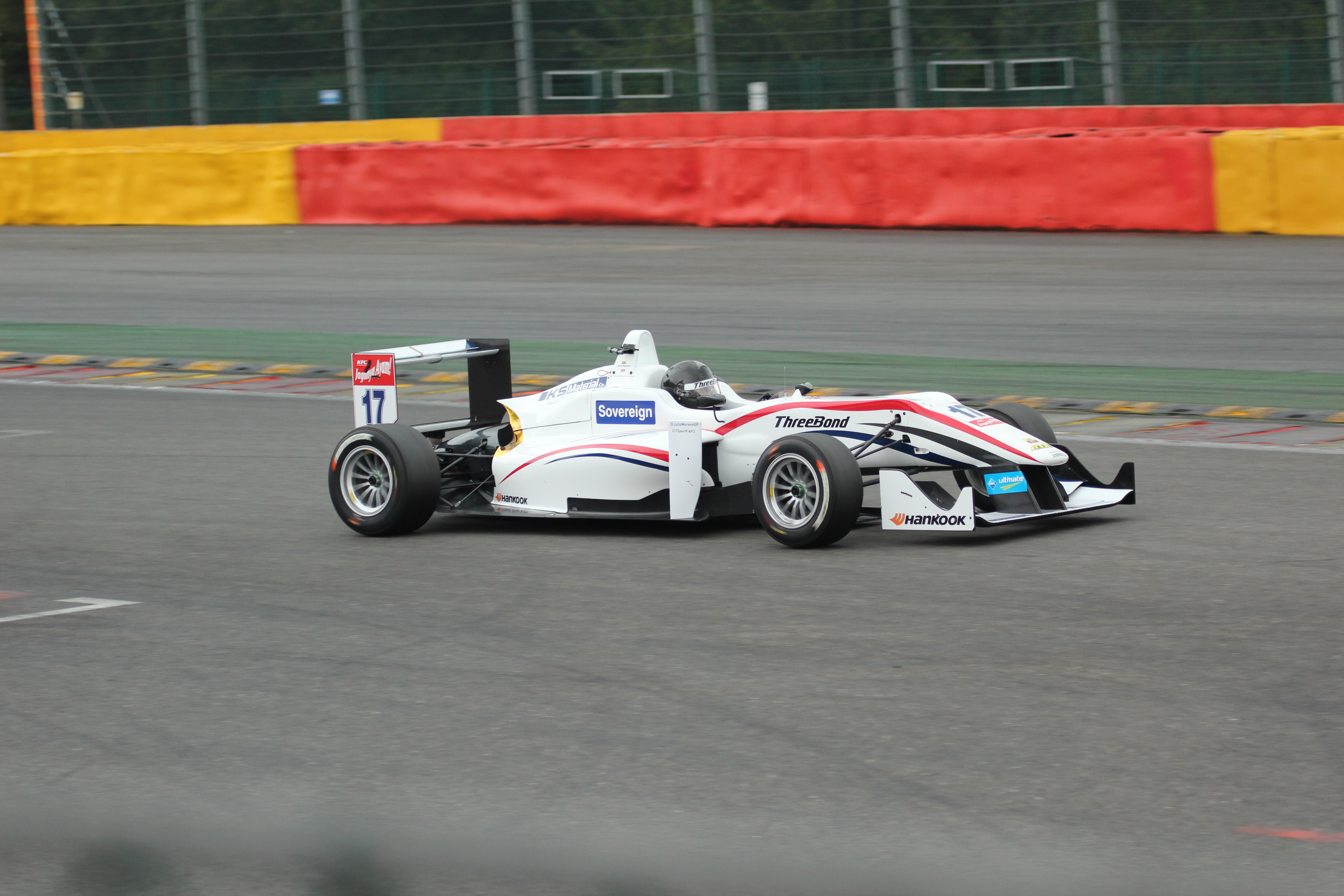
- Nationality: Ecuadorian
- Born: 12 June 1995 (age 31) Quito, Ecuador

Euroformula Open Championship
- Years active: 2016
- Teams: Campos Racing
- Starts: 16
- Wins: 0
- Poles: 0
- Fastest laps: 0
- Best finish: 14th in 2016

Previous series
- 2012 2013–14 2015: British Formula Ford Championship; Formula Renault 2.0 NEC; FIA Formula 3 European Championship

Julio Moreno (born 12 June 1995 in Quito) is a former racing driver from Ecuador. He has formerly competed in the FIA Formula 3 European Championship and Euroformula Open Championship.

== Racing Record ==
=== Career summary ===
Season	Series	Team	Races	Wins	Poles	F/Laps	Podiums	Points	Position
2012	British Formula Ford Championship	JTR	23	1	0	0	5	416	4th
2012	Formula Ford EuroCup	JTR	3	1	0	0	2	N/A	NC
2013	Formula Renault 2.0 NEC	JTR Racing	16	0	0	0	0	48	25th
2014	Formula Renault 2.0 NEC	Manor MP Motorsport	14	0	0	0	0	62	22nd
2014	Eurocup Formula Renault 2.0	Manor MP Motorsport	4	0	0	0	0	0	NC†
2015	FIA Formula 3 European Championship	Threebond with T-Sport	32	0	0	1	0	0	34th
2015	Masters of Formula 3	Threebond with T-Sport	2	0	0	0	0	N/A	10th
2016	Euroformula Open Championship	Campos Racing	16	0	0	0	0	30	14th

=== Complete Formula Renault 2.0 NEC results ===
(key) (Races in bold indicate pole position) (Races in italics indicate fastest lap)

Year	Entrant	1	2	3	4	5	6	7	8	9	10	11	12	13	14	15	16	17	DC	Points
2013	JTR Racing	HOC; 1; 29	HOC; 2 Ret	HOC; 3; 29	NÜR; 1; 25	NÜR; 2; 25	SIL; 1; 10	SIL; 2; 8	SPA; 1; 16	SPA; 2; 14	ASS; 1; 17	ASS; 2; 24	MST; 1; 21	MST; 2; 28	MST; 3; 16	ZAN; 1; 28	ZAN; 2; 18	ZAN; 3 C	25th	48
2014	Manor MP Motorsport	MNZ; 1; 17	MNZ; 2; 17	SIL; 1; 16	SIL; 2; 13	HOC; 1; 20	HOC; 2; 17	HOC; 3; 16	SPA; 1; 12	SPA; 2; 16	ASS; 1; 17	ASS; 2; 16	MST; 1 Ret	MST; 2; 15	MST; 3 C	NÜR; 1; 19	NÜR; 2; 21	NÜR; 3 C	22nd	62

=== Complete Eurocup Formula Renault 2.0 results ===
(key) (Races in bold indicate pole position; races in italics indicate fastest lap)

Year	Entrant	1	2	3	4	5	6	7	8	9	10	11	12	13	14	DC	Points
2014	Manor MP Motorsport	ALC; 1	ALC; 2	SPA; 1; 28	SPA; 2; 31	MSC; 1	MSC; 2	NÜR; 1; 25	NÜR; 2; 23	HUN; 1	HUN; 2	LEC; 1	LEC; 2	JER; 1	JER; 2	NC†	0

† As Moreno was a guest driver, he was ineligible for points
