= 2015 FIA Formula 3 European Championship =

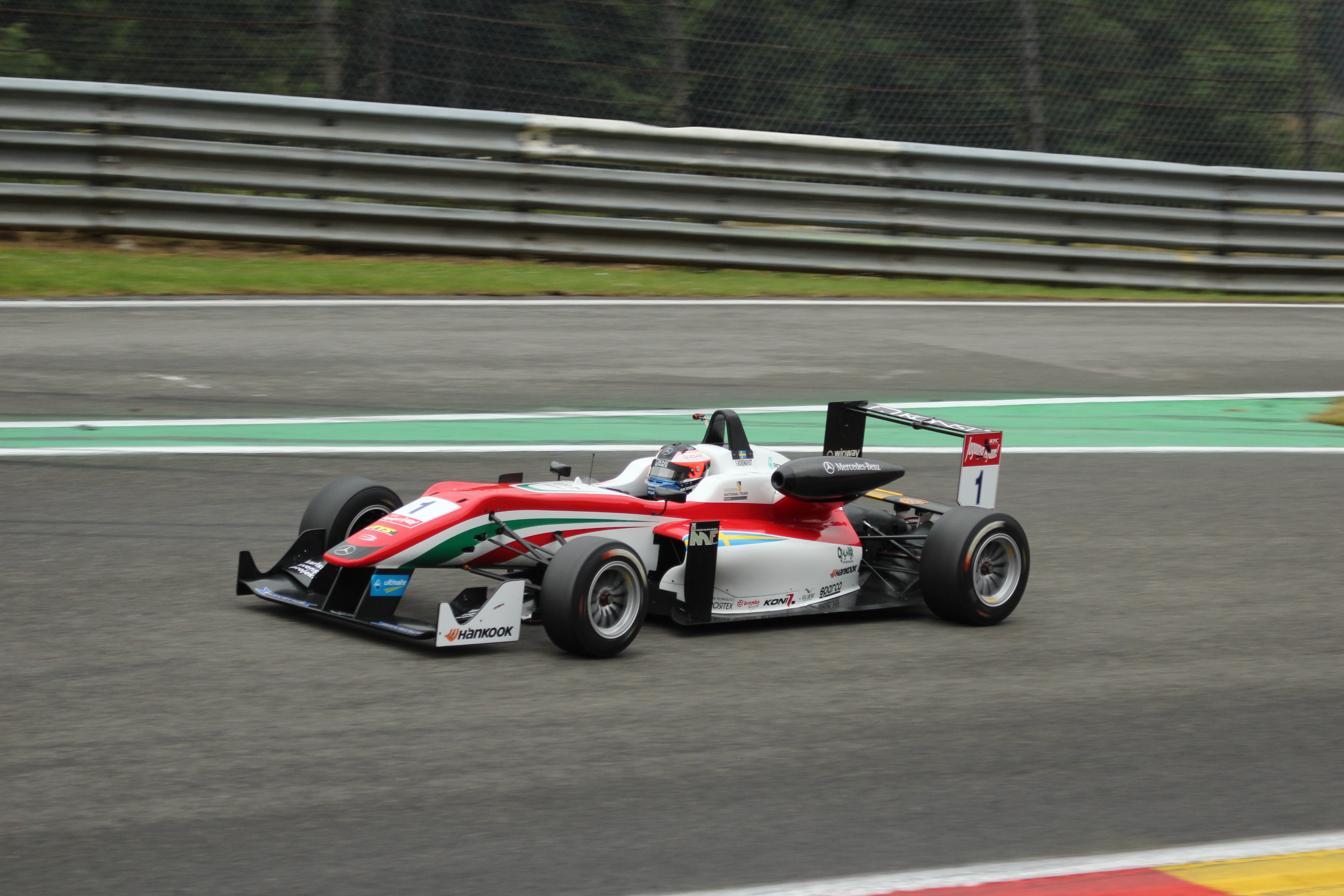
2015 champion Felix Rosenqvist

The 2015 FIA Formula 3 European Championship was a multi-event motor racing championship for single-seat open wheel formula racing cars that was held across Europe. The championship featured drivers competing in two-litre Formula Three racing cars which conform to the technical regulations, or formula, for the championship. It was the fourth edition of the FIA Formula 3 European Championship.

This season saw a significant increase in the number of participants at each Grand Prix, with some events featuring as many as 35 registered drivers.

Esteban Ocon was the reigning drivers' champion, but he did not defend his title as he moved across to the GP3 Series. His team, Prema Powerteam, was the defending winners of the teams' championship.

== Drivers and teams ==
The following teams and drivers competed during the 2015 season:

Team	Chassis (Note: All drivers competed in Dallara chassis; model listed.)	Engine	No.	Driver	Status	Rounds
(Italy) Prema Powerteam	F315/006	Mercedes	1	(Sweden) Felix Rosenqvist		All
(Italy) Prema Powerteam	F315/005	Mercedes	2	(United Kingdom) Jake Dennis (Note: Ineligible to score points for the team in the teams' championship at round 9.)		All
(Italy) Prema Powerteam	F312/015	Mercedes	24	(France) Brandon Maïsano (Note: Ineligible to score points for the team in the teams' championship.)		1–8
(Italy) Prema Powerteam	F312/015	Mercedes	24	(New Zealand) Nick Cassidy		9–10
(Italy) Prema Powerteam	F312/015	Mercedes	24	(Germany) Maximilian Günther	R	11
(Italy) Prema Powerteam	F315/004	Mercedes	25	(Canada) Lance Stroll (Note: Ineligible to score points for the team in the teams' championship at rounds 1–8.)	R	All
(United Kingdom) Jagonya Ayam with Carlin	F315/001	Volkswagen	3	(Italy) Antonio Giovinazzi		All
(United Kingdom) Jagonya Ayam with Carlin	F312/040	Volkswagen	4	(United States) Gustavo Menezes		All
(United Kingdom) Jagonya Ayam with Carlin	F312/002	Volkswagen	26	(United States) Ryan Tveter	R	All
(Germany) kfzteile24 Mücke Motorsport	F312/039	Mercedes	5	(United States) Santino Ferrucci (Note: Ineligible to score points for the team in the teams' championship at rounds 4–9.)		All
(Germany) kfzteile24 Mücke Motorsport	F312/019	Mercedes	6	(Italy) Michele Beretta		All
(Germany) kfzteile24 Mücke Motorsport	F312/023	Mercedes	27	(Denmark) Mikkel Jensen (Note: Ineligible to score points for the team in the teams' championship at rounds 1–3.)	R	All
(Germany) kfzteile24 Mücke Motorsport	F312/020	Mercedes	28	(Germany) Maximilian Günther	R	1–9
(Germany) kfzteile24 Mücke Motorsport	F312/044	Mercedes	35	(China) Kang Ling		1–8
(Germany) kfzteile24 Mücke Motorsport	F312/044	Mercedes	35	(Puerto Rico) Félix Serrallés		10
(Netherlands) Van Amersfoort Racing	F316/001	Volkswagen	7	(Monaco) Charles Leclerc	R	All
(Netherlands) Van Amersfoort Racing	F312/052	Volkswagen	8	(Italy) Alessio Lorandi (Note: Ineligible to score points for the team in the teams' championship at rounds 4–5, 7–8.)	R	All
(Netherlands) Van Amersfoort Racing	F312/051	Volkswagen	29	(India) Arjun Maini (Note: Ineligible to score points for the team in the teams' championship at rounds 1–3, 6, 9.)	R	All
(United Kingdom) Carlin	F314/020	Volkswagen	9	(Colombia) Tatiana Calderón (Note: Ineligible to score points for the team in the teams' championship at rounds 1–4, 6–9.)		All
(United Kingdom) Carlin	F312/010	Volkswagen	10	(United Kingdom) George Russell	R	All
(United Kingdom) Carlin	F312/004	Volkswagen	30	(United Kingdom) Callum Ilott (Note: Ineligible to score points for the team in the teams' championship at round 5.)	R	All
(United Kingdom) Team West-Tec F3	F312/011	Mercedes	11	(Germany) Fabian Schiller	R	1–8
(United Kingdom) Team West-Tec F3	F314/007	Mercedes	38	(South Africa) Raoul Hyman	R	All
(United Kingdom) Fortec Motorsports	F315/012	Mercedes	12	(Brazil) Pietro Fittipaldi	R	All
(United Kingdom) Fortec Motorsports	F312/007	Mercedes	14	(United Kingdom) Matthew Rao (Note: Ineligible to score points for the team in the teams' championship at rounds 5, 9.)		All
(United Kingdom) Fortec Motorsports	F312/035	Mercedes	31	(China) Martin Cao (Note: Ineligible to score points for the team in the teams' championship at rounds 1–4.)		1–5
(United Kingdom) Fortec Motorsports	F312/035	Mercedes	31	(Macau) Andy Chang (Note: Ineligible to score points for the team in the teams' championship at rounds 7–8.)		7–11
(United Kingdom) Fortec Motorsports	F312/003	Mercedes	32	(China) Peter Li		1–2, 7–11
(Italy) EuroInternational	F312/053	Mercedes	15	(Denmark) Nicolas Beer	R	1–2
(Italy) EuroInternational	F312/053	Mercedes	15	(Poland) Artur Janosz		4
(Italy) EuroInternational	F313/003	Mercedes	16	(Sweden) Gustav Malja	R	3
(Italy) EuroInternational	F313/003	Mercedes	16	(Argentina) Facu Regalia		4
(United Kingdom) Threebond with T-Sport	F312/008	NBE	17	(Ecuador) Julio Moreno	R	All
(United Kingdom) Double R Racing	F312/043	Mercedes	18	(Germany) Nicolas Pohler		1–7, 10–11
(United Kingdom) Double R Racing	F312/043	Mercedes	18	(Brazil) Matheus Leist	R	8
(United Kingdom) Double R Racing	F313/004	Mercedes	19	(Hong Kong) Matt Solomon	R	All
(France) Signature	F315/015	Volkswagen	20	(France) Dorian Boccolacci	R	All
(France) Signature	F315/002	Volkswagen	21	(Thailand) Alexander Albon	R	All
(Germany) Motopark	F314/021	Volkswagen	22	(Malaysia) Nabil Jeffri		All
(Germany) Motopark	F314/018	Volkswagen	23	(Brazil) Sérgio Sette Câmara (Note: Ineligible to score points for the team in the teams' championship at rounds 1–8.)		All
(Germany) Motopark	F314/016	Volkswagen	33	(India) Mahaveer Raghunathan	R	1–10
(Germany) Motopark	F314/016	Volkswagen	33	(Thailand) Tanart Sathienthirakul		11
(Germany) Motopark	F315/007	Volkswagen	34	(Germany) Markus Pommer		All
(Germany) Motopark	F315/003	Volkswagen	36	(United Kingdom) Sam MacLeod (Note: Ineligible to score points for the team in the teams' championship at round 9.)		1–10
(United Kingdom) HitechGP	F315/010	Mercedes	39	(United Kingdom) Alexander Sims	G	9, 11
(Russia) Artline Engineering	ArtTech P315	NBE	40	(Latvia) Harald Schlegelmilch	G	10–11
(Russia) Artline Engineering	ArtTech P315	NBE	41	(Germany) Marvin Dienst	R G	11

Icon	Legend
R	Rookie Cup
G	Guest drivers ineligible to score points

=== Driver changes ===
Joining FIA European Formula 3

- Alexander Albon, third in the 2014 Eurocup Formula Renault 2.0 season, joined Signature, where he was joined by 2014 French F4 runner-up Dorian Boccolacci.
- 2014 German Formula Three driver Nicolas Beer joined EuroInternational.
- 2014 Protyre Formula Renault champion Pietro Fittipaldi joined Fortec Motorsports. He was joined in the team by British Formula 3 competitors Hongwei Cao, Matt Rao and Zhi Cong Li.
- 2014 BRDC F4 driver Raoul Hyman made his championship début with Team West-Tec F3.
- Callum Ilott moved into the series with Carlin, having been signed as a member of the Red Bull Junior Team.
- The top two drivers in the 2014 ADAC Formel Masters season, Mikkel Jensen and Maximilian Günther moved to the championship with Mücke Motorsport. The team's lineup was completed by Kang Ling, who predominantly competed in German Formula Three in 2014.
- 2014 Formula Renault 2.0 Alps runner-up Charles Leclerc graduated to the series with Van Amersfoort Racing. He was joined by single-seaters débutant Alessio Lorandi and BRDC F4 runner-up Arjun Maini.
- 2014 German Formula Three competitors Nabil Jeffri, Sam MacLeod and Markus Pommer joined the series with the Motopark squad. They was joined by 2014 Italian F4 driver Mahaveer Raghunathan.
- Nicolas Pohler, who raced in the Euroformula Open Championship, joined Double R Racing for his series debut.
- 2014 BRDC F4 champion George Russell joined Carlin for his series début.
- 2014 Formula Renault 2.0 NEC driver Julio Moreno joined Threebond with T-Sport.
- Fabian Schiller graduated from ADAC Formel Masters to the championship with Team West-Tec F3.
- 2014 Formula Masters China runner-up Matt Solomon joined Double R Racing for his European single-seater debut.
- Lance Stroll and Brandon Maïsano – the overall and Trophy winners in the 2014 Italian F4 championship – continued their collaboration with Prema Powerteam into the series.
- Ryan Tveter, who raced in Eurocup Formula Renault 2.0, graduated to the championship with Carlin.

Changing teams

- Michele Beretta, who raced for EuroInternational moved to Mücke Motorsport.
- Tatiana Calderón moved from Jo Zeller Racing to Carlin.
- Sérgio Sette Câmara, who competed for EuroInternational at Imola in 2014, switched to Motopark.
- Jake Dennis left Carlin to join Prema Powerteam for his second season of European Formula 3.
- Santino Ferrucci, who drove for EuroInternational and Fortec Motorsports in 2014, joined Beretta at Mücke Motorsport.
- 2014 Van Amersfoort Racing driver Gustavo Menezes moved to Carlin, to replace Dennis.
- After three seasons with Mücke Motorsport, Felix Rosenqvist switched to Prema Powerteam.

Leaving FIA European Formula 3

- Van Amersfoort Racing driver Max Verstappen, who finished third in 2014, graduated to Formula One for Scuderia Toro Rosso.
- Prema Powerteam driver and 2014 champion Esteban Ocon stepped up to GP3 with ART Grand Prix.
- Mücke Motorsport driver Lucas Auer, who finished fourth in 2014 moved into the DTM with ART Grand Prix for the 2015 season. Jagonya Ayam with Carlin driver Tom Blomqvist will also move to the DTM, driving for BMW.
- Prema Powerteam driver Antonio Fuoco, who finished fifth in 2014, stepped up to GP3, with Carlin.
- Sean Gelael (Jagonya Ayam with Carlin), Nicholas Latifi (Prema) and Roy Nissany (Mücke) all moved to the Formula Renault 3.5 Series full-time. Gelael continued with Carlin, Latifi joined Arden International, and Nissany will be a part of the Tech 1 Racing team.
- Carlin driver Ed Jones, left the series to compete in the 2015 Indy Lights season, remaining with Carlin. Team West-Tec's Félix Serrallés will also move to Indy Lights, with Belardi Auto Racing.
- Carlin driver Jordan King, who finished seventh in 2014, stepped up to GP2, with Racing Engineering.

=== Team changes ===
- 2013 and 2014 German Formula Three champions Motopark will make their debut in the championship.

== Calendar ==
A provisional eleven-round calendar was announced on 4 December 2014. The series will return to Zandvoort (replacing the Hungaroring) after a one-year absence, while the Italian round has been moved from Autodromo Enzo e Dino Ferrari to Monza, still supporting the Italian GT Championship. On 3 May 2015, was announced that round at Moscow Raceway will be changed to Algarve International Circuit.

R.	RN	Circuit	Date	Supporting
1	1	(United Kingdom) Silverstone Circuit, Silverstone	11 April	6 Hours of Silverstone
1	2	(United Kingdom) Silverstone Circuit, Silverstone	11 April	6 Hours of Silverstone
1	3	(United Kingdom) Silverstone Circuit, Silverstone	12 April	6 Hours of Silverstone
2	4	(Germany) Hockenheimring, Baden-Württemberg	1 May	Deutsche Tourenwagen Masters
2	5	(Germany) Hockenheimring, Baden-Württemberg	2 May	Deutsche Tourenwagen Masters
2	6	(Germany) Hockenheimring, Baden-Württemberg	3 May	Deutsche Tourenwagen Masters
3	7	(France) Circuit de Pau-Ville, Pau	16 May	Pau Grand Prix
3	8	(France) Circuit de Pau-Ville, Pau	16 May	Pau Grand Prix
3	9	(France) Circuit de Pau-Ville, Pau	17 May	Pau Grand Prix
4	10	(Italy) Autodromo Nazionale Monza, Monza	30 May	Italian GT Championship
4	11	(Italy) Autodromo Nazionale Monza, Monza	30 May	Italian GT Championship
4	12	(Italy) Autodromo Nazionale Monza, Monza	31 May	Italian GT Championship
5	13	(Belgium) Circuit de Spa-Francorchamps, Francorchamps	20 June	ADAC GT Masters
5	14	(Belgium) Circuit de Spa-Francorchamps, Francorchamps	20 June	ADAC GT Masters
5	15	(Belgium) Circuit de Spa-Francorchamps, Francorchamps	21 June	ADAC GT Masters
6	16	(Germany) Norisring, Nuremberg	27 June	Deutsche Tourenwagen Masters
6	17	(Germany) Norisring, Nuremberg	27 June	Deutsche Tourenwagen Masters
6	18	(Germany) Norisring, Nuremberg	28 June	Deutsche Tourenwagen Masters
7	19	(Netherlands) Circuit Park Zandvoort, Zandvoort	11 July	Deutsche Tourenwagen Masters
7	20	(Netherlands) Circuit Park Zandvoort, Zandvoort	11 July	Deutsche Tourenwagen Masters
7	21	(Netherlands) Circuit Park Zandvoort, Zandvoort	12 July	Deutsche Tourenwagen Masters
8	22	(Austria) Red Bull Ring, Spielberg	1 August	Deutsche Tourenwagen Masters
8	23	(Austria) Red Bull Ring, Spielberg	1 August	Deutsche Tourenwagen Masters
8	24	(Austria) Red Bull Ring, Spielberg	2 August	Deutsche Tourenwagen Masters
9	25	(Portugal) Algarve International Circuit, Portimão	5 September	Blancpain Sprint Series
9	26	(Portugal) Algarve International Circuit, Portimão	5 September	Blancpain Sprint Series
9	27	(Portugal) Algarve International Circuit, Portimão	6 September	Blancpain Sprint Series
10	28	(Germany) Nürburgring, Rhineland-Palatinate	26 September	Deutsche Tourenwagen Masters
10	29	(Germany) Nürburgring, Rhineland-Palatinate	26 September	Deutsche Tourenwagen Masters
10	30	(Germany) Nürburgring, Rhineland-Palatinate	27 September	Deutsche Tourenwagen Masters
11	31	(Germany) Hockenheimring, Baden-Württemberg	17 October	Deutsche Tourenwagen Masters
11	32	(Germany) Hockenheimring, Baden-Württemberg	17 October	Deutsche Tourenwagen Masters
11	33	(Germany) Hockenheimring, Baden-Württemberg	18 October	Deutsche Tourenwagen Masters

== Results ==
Round		Circuit	Pole position	Fastest lap	Winning driver	Winning team	Rookie winner
1	R1	(United Kingdom) Silverstone Circuit	(Sweden) Felix Rosenqvist	(Sweden) Felix Rosenqvist	(Sweden) Felix Rosenqvist	(Italy) Prema Powerteam	(Thailand) Alexander Albon
1	R2	(United Kingdom) Silverstone Circuit	(Monaco) Charles Leclerc	(Monaco) Charles Leclerc	(United Kingdom) George Russell	(United Kingdom) Carlin	(United Kingdom) George Russell
1	R3	(United Kingdom) Silverstone Circuit	(Monaco) Charles Leclerc	(Monaco) Charles Leclerc	(Monaco) Charles Leclerc	(Netherlands) Van Amersfoort Racing	(Monaco) Charles Leclerc
2	R1	(Germany) Hockenheimring	(Sweden) Felix Rosenqvist	(Italy) Antonio Giovinazzi	(Italy) Antonio Giovinazzi	(United Kingdom) Jagonya Ayam with Carlin	(Monaco) Charles Leclerc
2	R2	(Germany) Hockenheimring	(Sweden) Felix Rosenqvist	(Sweden) Felix Rosenqvist	(Sweden) Felix Rosenqvist	(Italy) Prema Powerteam	(Monaco) Charles Leclerc
2	R3	(Germany) Hockenheimring	(Sweden) Felix Rosenqvist	(Monaco) Charles Leclerc	(Monaco) Charles Leclerc	(Netherlands) Van Amersfoort Racing	(Monaco) Charles Leclerc
3	R1	(France) Circuit de Pau-Ville	(United Kingdom) Jake Dennis	(Monaco) Charles Leclerc	(United Kingdom) Jake Dennis	(Italy) Prema Powerteam	(Monaco) Charles Leclerc
3	R2	(France) Circuit de Pau-Ville	(United Kingdom) Jake Dennis	(United Kingdom) Jake Dennis	(United Kingdom) Jake Dennis	(Italy) Prema Powerteam	(Monaco) Charles Leclerc
3	R3	(France) Circuit de Pau-Ville	(United Kingdom) Jake Dennis	(United Kingdom) Jake Dennis	(Italy) Antonio Giovinazzi	(United Kingdom) Jagonya Ayam with Carlin	(Germany) Maximilian Günther
4	R1	(Italy) Autodromo Nazionale Monza	(Sweden) Felix Rosenqvist	(Sweden) Felix Rosenqvist	(Sweden) Felix Rosenqvist	(Italy) Prema Powerteam	(Denmark) Mikkel Jensen
4	R2	(Italy) Autodromo Nazionale Monza	(Sweden) Felix Rosenqvist	(Sweden) Felix Rosenqvist	(Sweden) Felix Rosenqvist	(Italy) Prema Powerteam	(Denmark) Mikkel Jensen
4	R3	(Italy) Autodromo Nazionale Monza	(Sweden) Felix Rosenqvist	(United Kingdom) Jake Dennis	(Sweden) Felix Rosenqvist	(Italy) Prema Powerteam	(Monaco) Charles Leclerc
5	R1	(Belgium) Circuit de Spa-Francorchamps	(Sweden) Felix Rosenqvist	(United States) Santino Ferrucci	(Monaco) Charles Leclerc	(Netherlands) Van Amersfoort Racing	(Monaco) Charles Leclerc
5	R2	(Belgium) Circuit de Spa-Francorchamps	(Denmark) Mikkel Jensen	(Sweden) Felix Rosenqvist	(United Kingdom) Jake Dennis	(Italy) Prema Powerteam	(France) Dorian Boccolacci
5	R3	(Belgium) Circuit de Spa-Francorchamps	(United Kingdom) Jake Dennis	(Sweden) Felix Rosenqvist	(United Kingdom) Jake Dennis	(Italy) Prema Powerteam	(Monaco) Charles Leclerc
6	R1	(Germany) Norisring	(Monaco) Charles Leclerc	(Thailand) Alexander Albon	(Monaco) Charles Leclerc	(Netherlands) Van Amersfoort Racing	(Monaco) Charles Leclerc
6	R2	(Germany) Norisring	(Thailand) Alexander Albon	(Germany) Markus Pommer	(Germany) Maximilian Günther	(Germany) Mücke Motorsport	(Germany) Maximilian Günther
6	R3	(Germany) Norisring	(Thailand) Alexander Albon	(Monaco) Charles Leclerc	(Italy) Antonio Giovinazzi	(United Kingdom) Jagonya Ayam with Carlin	(United Kingdom) George Russell
7	R1	(Netherlands) Circuit Park Zandvoort	(Italy) Antonio Giovinazzi	(United Kingdom) Jake Dennis	(Italy) Antonio Giovinazzi	(United Kingdom) Jagonya Ayam with Carlin	(Canada) Lance Stroll
7	R2	(Netherlands) Circuit Park Zandvoort	(Sweden) Felix Rosenqvist	(Sweden) Felix Rosenqvist	(Sweden) Felix Rosenqvist	(Italy) Prema Powerteam	(Thailand) Alexander Albon
7	R3	(Netherlands) Circuit Park Zandvoort	(Italy) Antonio Giovinazzi	(Italy) Antonio Giovinazzi	(Germany) Markus Pommer	(Germany) Motopark	(Canada) Lance Stroll
8	R1	(Austria) Red Bull Ring	(Sweden) Felix Rosenqvist	(United States) Gustavo Menezes	(United Kingdom) Jake Dennis	(Italy) Prema Powerteam	(Canada) Lance Stroll
8	R2	(Austria) Red Bull Ring	(Sweden) Felix Rosenqvist	(Italy) Antonio Giovinazzi	(Sweden) Felix Rosenqvist	(Italy) Prema Powerteam	(Canada) Lance Stroll
8	R3	(Austria) Red Bull Ring	(Italy) Antonio Giovinazzi	(Ecuador) Julio Moreno	(Italy) Antonio Giovinazzi	(United Kingdom) Jagonya Ayam with Carlin	(Canada) Lance Stroll
9	R1	(Portugal) Algarve International Circuit	(United Kingdom) Jake Dennis	(United Kingdom) Jake Dennis	(United Kingdom) Jake Dennis	(Italy) Prema Powerteam	(Thailand) Alexander Albon
9	R2	(Portugal) Algarve International Circuit	(Sweden) Felix Rosenqvist	(Sweden) Felix Rosenqvist	(Sweden) Felix Rosenqvist	(Italy) Prema Powerteam	(Canada) Lance Stroll
9	R3	(Portugal) Algarve International Circuit	(Sweden) Felix Rosenqvist	(Sweden) Felix Rosenqvist	(Sweden) Felix Rosenqvist	(Italy) Prema Powerteam	(Canada) Lance Stroll
10	R1	(Germany) Nürburgring	(Sweden) Felix Rosenqvist	(Sweden) Felix Rosenqvist	(Sweden) Felix Rosenqvist	(Italy) Prema Powerteam	(United Kingdom) Callum Ilott
10	R2	(Germany) Nürburgring	(Sweden) Felix Rosenqvist	(Sweden) Felix Rosenqvist	(Sweden) Felix Rosenqvist	(Italy) Prema Powerteam	(Canada) Lance Stroll
10	R3	(Germany) Nürburgring	(Sweden) Felix Rosenqvist	(Sweden) Felix Rosenqvist	(Sweden) Felix Rosenqvist	(Italy) Prema Powerteam	(Canada) Lance Stroll
11	R1	(Germany) Hockenheimring	(Sweden) Felix Rosenqvist	(United Kingdom) Alexander Sims	(Canada) Lance Stroll	(Italy) Prema Powerteam	(Canada) Lance Stroll
11	R2	(Germany) Hockenheimring	(Italy) Antonio Giovinazzi	(Italy) Antonio Giovinazzi	(Italy) Antonio Giovinazzi	(United Kingdom) Jagonya Ayam with Carlin	(Germany) Maximilian Günther
11	R3	(Germany) Hockenheimring	(United Kingdom) Jake Dennis	(Sweden) Felix Rosenqvist	(Sweden) Felix Rosenqvist	(Italy) Prema Powerteam	(Thailand) Alexander Albon

== Championship standings ==
Scoring system

Position	1st	2nd	3rd	4th	5th	6th	7th	8th	9th	10th
Points	25	18	15	12	10	8	6	4	2	1

=== Drivers' championship ===
The second and third races at Monza (both for safety car incidents) and the third race at Spielberg (rain) were red-flagged after three laps were completed, but before 75% of the scheduled distance in laps, the necessary distance required for a race to pay full points. All three races paid half points to all classified finishers.

At Monza, the second race was red-flagged on Lap 14 of 19, with 2:20 remaining in the 35-minute race, as the Safety Car would have resulted in the race ending under caution because of multiple Safety Car periods caused by incidents. The excessive number of incidents during the race resulted in a warning by officials during the drivers' meeting of proper driver conduct before the start of the third race. A start crash involving Ryan Tveter and Fabian Schiller resulted in officials imposing an ultimatum that drivers be on their best behaviour or the race would be abandoned. On lap six Lance Stroll and Mikkel Jensen collided causing the race to be red-flagged three laps later. As a result, series organisers awarded half points to each of the classified finishers eligible to score points. Rosenqvist won all three of the Monza races, but expressed frustration with the driving standards on display.

At Spielberg, the third race ended due to early torrential rain.

(key)

Pos.	Driver	SIL (United Kingdom)			HOC (Germany)			PAU (France)			MNZ (Italy)			SPA (Belgium)			NOR (Germany)			ZAN (Netherlands)			RBR (Austria)			ALG (Portugal)			NÜR (Germany)			HOC (Germany)			Points
Pos.	Driver	R1	R2	R3	R1	R2	R3	R1	R2	R3	R1	R2	R3	R1	R2	R3	R1	R2	R3	R1	R2	R3	R1	R2	R3	R1	R2	R3	R1	R2	R3	R1	R2	R3	Points
1	(Sweden) Felix Rosenqvist	1	7	12	2	1	2	13	5	6	1	1	1	2	Ret	5	3	17	13	2	1	3	2	1	2	3	1	1	1	1	1	3	3	1	508
2	(Italy) Antonio Giovinazzi	2	3	2	1	3	3	2	3	1	4	Ret	4	Ret	9	15	2	22	1	1	2	2	3	2	1	9	8	8	10	2	13	6	1	3	412.5
3	(United Kingdom) Jake Dennis	3	Ret	3	4	15	8	1	1	23	3	2	2	5	1	1	Ret	Ret	11	Ret	3	4	1	8	7	1	2	2	Ret	4	4	2	2	7	377
4	(Monaco) Charles Leclerc	12	2	1	3	2	1	3	2	3	5	Ret	3	1	6	2	1	3	4	5	Ret	10	6	4	6	6	7	7	4	5	5	8	10	23	363.5
5	(Canada) Lance Stroll	6	4	Ret	6	14	6	9	10	4	11	Ret	DSQ	31	Ret	EX	8	4	26	4	Ret	5	4	3	5	4	3	3	9	3	2	1	6	Ret	231
6	(United Kingdom) George Russell	8	1	5	11	9	18	8	6	8	8	6	7	6	13	3	10	5	2	6	5	6	5	7	9	10	5	4	13	8	10	7	8	Ret	203
7	(Thailand) Alexander Albon	4	6	6	13	8	9	5	7	NC	21	WD	WD	3	16	9	5	2	3	7	4	8	7	5	8	2	12	Ret	12	14	11	11	Ret	2	187
8	(Germany) Maximilian Günther	9	12	21	5	4	5	4	18	2	Ret	Ret	9	13	7	8	4	1	Ret	29	7	12	20	14	19	14	14	Ret				4	4	6	152
9	(Denmark) Mikkel Jensen	13	10	10	7	11	4	7	12	9	2	3	Ret	7	Ret	Ret	12	6	5	8	18	Ret	10	9	13	8	9	DNS	5	10	Ret	19	5	8	117.5
10	(Germany) Markus Pommer	5	Ret	7	DSQ	17	7	23	8	20	Ret	8	10	19	28	DSQ	9	11	12	3	21	1	17	6	4	5	11	Ret	6	13	6	9	9	21	116.5
11	(United States) Santino Ferrucci	18	9	13	10	6	28	Ret	11	10	Ret	4	8	4	2	12	Ret	Ret	6	28	8	9	12	13	11	7	10	Ret	7	7	7	10	17	Ret	91
12	(United Kingdom) Callum Ilott	10	19	9	12	5	10	11	15	16	20	14	14	14	11	4	11	16	7	11	12	22	30	12	10	16	26†	11	3	9	8	15	11	5	65.5
13	(United States) Gustavo Menezes	7	18	4	9	7	11	15	14	Ret	13	5	6	22	Ret	DNS	7	7	Ret	16	10	Ret	8	10	12	15	4	Ret	14	Ret	14	20	12	13	65
14	(Brazil) Sérgio Sette Câmara	17	Ret	20	17	25	27	14	20	11	Ret	11	22	16	3	22	15	23	19	Ret	6	7	9	19	3	11	13	5	11	11	9	17	7	11	57.5
15	(France) Brandon Maïsano	Ret	5	8	8	10	17	10	Ret	21	9	7	5	15	4	6	20	10	10	10	13	29	26	WD	WD										53
16	(New Zealand) Nick Cassidy																									32	Ret	9	2	6	3				43
17	(Brazil) Pietro Fittipaldi	11	8	Ret	Ret	20	Ret	DNS	DNQ	DNQ	7	9	11	8	21	10	19	Ret	16	17	20	20	23	32	24	12	6	6	15	Ret	18	13	16	Ret	32
18	(India) Arjun Maini	Ret	14	16	15	Ret	13	12	4	5	10	20	20	17	23	16	Ret	14	17	13	15	17	21	15	22	28	24	16	8	12	16	29	14	17	27
19	(France) Dorian Boccolacci	21	Ret	17	20	32	12	Ret	26	14	Ret	28	EX	18	5	13	6	8	8	15	Ret	25	16	17	17	22	16	10	21	17	Ret	30	15	24	27
20	(Italy) Alessio Lorandi	Ret	16	14	Ret	30	Ret	6	13	7	18	13	17	10	10	7	17	9	9	30	28	19	15	28	20	17	27	Ret	19	Ret	Ret	12	13	12	26
21	(South Africa) Raoul Hyman	19	27	28	Ret	13	16	16	22	26	6	10	12	30	8	Ret	Ret	18	18	14	14	11	11	11	14	19	Ret	18	16	19	Ret	Ret	Ret	10	14.5
22	(Italy) Michele Beretta	24	Ret	19	23	24	19	Ret	Ret	Ret	15	Ret	DNS	21	24	21	Ret	Ret	20	18	16	15	22	30	18	27	20	14	25	24	17	14	20	9	4
23	(United States) Ryan Tveter	Ret	15	11	Ret	Ret	20	24	21	17	12	27	Ret	11	12	14	13	Ret	21	Ret	9	Ret	Ret	Ret	32	23	21	12	24	16	21	16	29	Ret	2
24	(United Kingdom) Sam MacLeod	22	Ret	Ret	19	19	14	Ret	9	12	Ret	12	26	12	18	11	16	13	Ret	12	19	16	18	29	15	13	17	23	23	21	Ret				2
25	(Germany) Fabian Schiller	16	11	25	16	12	15	Ret	Ret	18	Ret	25	Ret	9	15	Ret	26	15	15	25	25	13	19	27	28										2
26	(Malaysia) Nabil Jeffri	15	13	15	22	22	22	18	17	15	Ret	21	21	24	17	23	24	24	Ret	9	22	18	14	16	21	18	Ret	20	17	22	12	21	Ret	Ret	2
27	(Colombia) Tatiana Calderón	20	Ret	22	Ret	21	25	17	19	Ret	17	22	13	25	25	18	14	12	14	19	11	14	13	21	16	29	Ret	15	20	15	Ret	18	21	22	0
28	(Hong Kong) Matt Solomon	25	26	24	21	26	23	25	Ret	13	Ret	19	19	Ret	19	25	Ret	25	Ret	21	17	Ret	Ret	20	26	21	25	22	28	Ret	18	26	26	14	0
29	(United Kingdom) Matthew Rao	Ret	22	Ret	14	16	31	19	24	19	16	15	EX	23	14	Ret	23	21	Ret	22	23	27	25	31	25	25	Ret	21	22	18	Ret	23	28	18	0
30	(China) Hongwei Cao	23	17	23	18	18	21	21	16	24	14	17	15	20	20	17																			0
31	(Denmark) Nicolas Beer	14	20	18	Ret	DNS	DNS																												0
32	(Germany) Nicolas Pohler	27	24	26	Ret	23	32†	Ret	23	22	19	18	16	27	22	Ret	22	Ret	24	24	29	Ret							31	25	Ret	22	24	15	0
33	(Puerto Rico) Félix Serrallés																												18	Ret	15				0
34	(Ecuador) Julio Moreno	28	23	30	Ret	27	26	22	Ret	DNS	Ret	23	23	28	26	19	18	19	23	31	27	24	28	22	31	31	19	17	29	20	Ret	24	19	16	0
35	(Poland) Artur Janosz										Ret	16	18																						0
36	(Macau) Wing Chung Chang																			20	26	21	24	18	23	24	18	Ret	26	Ret	Ret	Ret	18	20	0
37	(China) Peter Li	Ret	28	27	25	29	29													26	31	26	32	23	30	26	22	19	27	23	20	Ret	27	19	0
38	(China) Kang Ling	Ret	21	Ret	Ret	28	24	20	Ret	Ret	Ret	26	24	26	Ret	20	21	Ret	22	23	24	23	29	26	Ret										0
39	(India) Mahaveer Raghunathan	26	25	29	24	31	30	DNQ	DNQ	DNQ	Ret	24	25	29	27	24	25	20	25	27	30	28	31	25	29	30	23	DNS	30	26	22				0
40	(Thailand) Tanart Sathienthirakul																															25	23	Ret	0
41	(Brazil) Matheus Leist																						27	24	27										0
42	(Sweden) Gustav Malja							Ret	25	25																									0
	(Argentina) Facu Regalia										WD	WD	WD																						0
Guest drivers ineligible for points
	(United Kingdom) Alexander Sims																									20	15	13				5	DSQ	4	0
	(Latvia) Harald Schlegelmilch																												31	27	23	28	22	Ret	0
	(Germany) Marvin Dienst																															27	25	Ret	0
Pos.	Driver	R1	R2	R3	R1	R2	R3	R1	R2	R3	R1	R2	R3	R1	R2	R3	R1	R2	R3	R1	R2	R3	R1	R2	R3	R1	R2	R3	R1	R2	R3	R1	R2	R3	Points
Pos.	Driver	SIL (United Kingdom)			HOC (Germany)			PAU (France)			MNZ (Italy)			SPA (Belgium)			NOR (Germany)			ZAN (Netherlands)			RBR (Austria)			ALG (Portugal)			NÜR (Germany)			HOC (Germany)			Points

† — Drivers did not finish the race, but were classified as they completed over 90% of the race distance.

=== Rookies' Championship ===
Pos.	Driver	SIL (United Kingdom)			HOC (Germany)			PAU (France)			MNZ (Italy)			SPA (Belgium)			NOR (Germany)			ZAN (Netherlands)			RBR (Austria)			ALG (Portugal)			NÜR (Germany)			HOC (Germany)			Points
Pos.	Driver	R1	R2	R3	R1	R2	R3	R1	R2	R3	R1	R2	R3	R1	R2	R3	R1	R2	R3	R1	R2	R3	R1	R2	R3	R1	R2	R3	R1	R2	R3	R1	R2	R3	Points
1	(Monaco) Charles Leclerc	12	2	1	3	2	1	3	2	3	5	Ret	3	1	6	2	1	3	4	5	Ret	10	6	4	6	6	7	7	4	5	5	8	10	23	533.5
2	(United Kingdom) George Russell	8	1	5	12	9	18	8	6	8	8	6	7	6	13	3	10	5	2	6	5	6	5	7	9	10	5	4	13	8	10	7	8	Ret	410
3	(Canada) Lance Stroll	6	4	Ret	6	14	6	9	10	4	11	Ret	DSQ	31	Ret	EX	8	4	26	4	Ret	5	4	3	5	4	3	3	9	3	2	1	6	Ret	401.5
4	(Thailand) Alexander Albon	4	6	6	14	8	9	5	7	Ret	21	WD	WD	3	16	9	5	2	3	7	4	8	7	5	8	2	12	Ret	12	14	11	11	Ret	2	363.5
5	(Germany) Maximilian Günther	9	12	21	5	4	5	4	18	2	Ret	Ret	9	13	7	8	4	1	Ret	29	7	12	20	14	19	14	14	Ret				4	4	6	288.5
6	(Denmark) Mikkel Jensen	13	10	10	8	11	4	7	12	9	2	3	Ret	7	Ret	Ret	12	6	5	8	18	Ret	10	9	13	8	9	DNS	5	10	Ret	19	5	8	271.5
7	(United Kingdom) Callum Ilott	10	19	9	13	5	10	11	15	16	20	14	14	14	11	4	11	16	7	11	12	22	30	12	10	16	26†	11	3	9	8	15	11	5	234
8	(Brazil) Pietro Fittipaldi	11	8	Ret	Ret	20	Ret	DNS	DNQ	DNQ	7	9	11	8	21	10	19	Ret	16	17	20	20	23	32	24	12	6	6	15	Ret	18	13	16	Ret	120.5
9	(India) Arjun Maini	Ret	14	16	16	Ret	13	12	4	5	10	Ret	20	17	23	16	Ret	14	17	13	15	17	21	15	22	28	24	16	8	12	16	29	14	17	117
10	(Italy) Alessio Lorandi	Ret	16	14	Ret	30	Ret	6	13	8	18	13	17	10	10	7	17	9	9	30	28	19	15	28	20	17	27	Ret	19	Ret	Ret	12	13	12	116.5
11	(South Africa) Raoul Hyman	19	27	28	Ret	13	16	16	22	26	6	10	12	30	8	Ret	Ret	18	18	14	14	11	11	11	14	19	Ret	18	16	19	Ret	Ret	Ret	10	100
12	(France) Dorian Boccolacci	21	Ret	17	21	32	12	Ret	26	14	Ret	28	EX	18	5	13	6	8	8	15	Ret	25	16	17	17	22	16	10	21	17	Ret	30	15	24	93
13	(United States) Ryan Tveter	Ret	15	11	Ret	Ret	20	24	21	17	12	27	Ret	11	12	14	13	Ret	21	Ret	9	Ret	Ret	Ret	32	23	21	12	24	16	21	16	29	Ret	55
14	(Germany) Fabian Schiller	16	11	25	17	12	15	Ret	Ret	18	Ret	25	Ret	9	15	Ret	26	15	15	25	25	13	19	27	28										40
15	(Hong Kong) Matt Solomon	25	26	24	22	26	23	25	Ret	13	Ret	19	19	Ret	19	25	Ret	25	Ret	21	17	Ret	Ret	20	26	21	25	22	28	Ret	18	26	26	14	23
16	(Ecuador) Julio Moreno	28	23	30	Ret	27	26	22	Ret	DNS	Ret	23	23	28	26	19	18	19	23	31	27	24	28	22	31	31	19	17	29	20	Ret	24	19	16	9.5
17	(Denmark) Nicolas Beer	14	20	18	Ret	DNS	DNS																												3
18	(India) Mahaveer Raghunathan	26	25	29	25	31	30	DNQ	DNQ	DNQ	Ret	24	25	29	27	24	25	20	25	27	30	28	31	25	29	30	23	DNS	30	26	22				1.5
19	(Brazil) Matheus Leist																						27	24	27										0
20	(Sweden) Gustav Malja							Ret	25	25																									0
Pos.	Driver	R1	R2	R3	R1	R2	R3	R1	R2	R3	R1	R2	R3	R1	R2	R3	R1	R2	R3	R1	R2	R3	R1	R2	R3	R1	R2	R3	R1	R2	R3	R1	R2	R3	Points
Pos.	Driver	SIL (United Kingdom)			HOC (Germany)			PAU (France)			MNZ (Italy)			SPA (Belgium)			NOR (Germany)			ZAN (Netherlands)			RBR (Austria)			ALG (Portugal)			NÜR (Germany)			HOC (Germany)			Points

=== Teams' championship ===
Prior to each round of the championship, two drivers from each team – if applicable – were nominated to score teams' championship points.

Pos	Team	Points
1	(Italy) Prema Powerteam	912
2	(United Kingdom) Jagonya Ayam with Carlin	532.5
3	(Netherlands) Van Amersfoort Racing	464.5
4	(United Kingdom) Carlin	362.5
5	(Germany) kfzteile24 Mücke Motorsport	326
6	(France) Signature	278
7	(Germany) Motopark	196.5
8	(United Kingdom) Fortec Motorsports	54
9	(United Kingdom) Team West-Tec F3	51.5
10	(United Kingdom) Double R Racing	4
11	(United Kingdom) HitechGP	1
12	(Italy) EuroInternational	0
13	(United Kingdom) ThreeBond with T-Sport	0
