= Yas Island Formula 2 round =

FIA Formula 2 Championship series race

(United Arab Emirates) Yas Island Formula 2 round
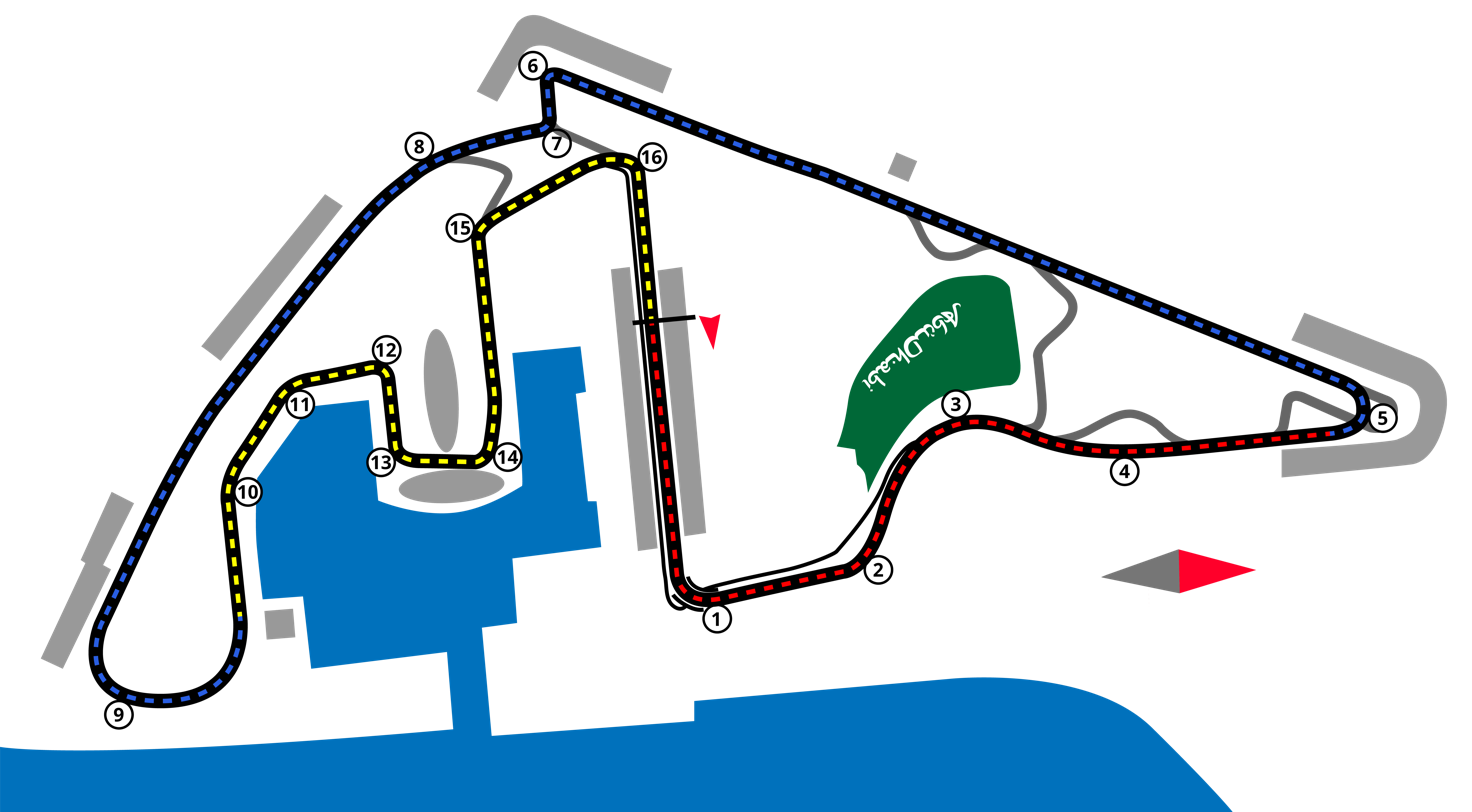

FIA Formula 2 Championship
- Venue: Yas Marina Circuit
- Location: Abu Dhabi, United Arab Emirates
- First race: 2017
- Most wins (driver): (Paraguay) Joshua Dürksen (2)
- Most wins (team): (United Kingdom) Virtuosi Racing (Italy) Prema Racing (3)
- Lap record: 1:37.445 ( (United Kingdom) Roy Nissany, DAMS, F2 2018, 2021)

2017–2019 (Note: Older layout of the Yas Marina Circuit, which held F2 races in 2017–2019.)
- Lap record: 1:50.314 ( (Thailand) Alexander Albon, ART Grand Prix, GP2/11, 2017)

The Yas Island Formula 2 round is a FIA Formula 2 Championship series race that is run on the Yas Marina Circuit track in Abu Dhabi, United Arab Emirates.

== Winners ==
Year	Race	Driver	Team	Report
2017	Feature	(Russia) Artem Markelov	Russian Time	Report
2017	Sprint	(Monaco) Charles Leclerc	Prema Racing	Report
2018	Feature	(United Kingdom) George Russell	ART Grand Prix	Report
2018	Sprint	(Italy) Antonio Fuoco	Charouz Racing System	Report
2019	Feature	(Brazil) Sérgio Sette Câmara	DAMS	Report
2019	Sprint	(Italy) Luca Ghiotto	UNI-Virtuosi Racing	Report
2021	Sprint 1	(India) Jehan Daruvala	Carlin	Report
2021	Sprint 2	(China) Guanyu Zhou	UNI-Virtuosi Racing	Report
2021	Feature	(Australia) Oscar Piastri	Prema Racing	Report
2022	Sprint	(New Zealand) Liam Lawson	Carlin	Report
2022	Feature	(Japan) Ayumu Iwasa	DAMS	Report
2023	Sprint	(Denmark) Frederik Vesti	Prema Racing	Report
2023	Feature	(Australia) Jack Doohan	Virtuosi	Report
2024	Sprint	(Spain) Pepe Martí	Campos Racing	Report
2024	Feature	(Paraguay) Joshua Dürksen	AIX Racing	Report
2025	Sprint	(United Kingdom) Arvid Lindblad	Campos Racing	Report
2025	Feature	(Paraguay) Joshua Dürksen	AIX Racing	Report

== See also ==
- Abu Dhabi Grand Prix
