= 2019 Yas Island Formula 2 round =

Car racing competition

(United Arab Emirates) 2019 Yas Island Formula 2 round
Round details
- Round 12 of 12 in the 2019 FIA Formula 2 Championship.
- Layout of the Yas Marina Circuit
- Location: Yas Marina Circuit, Abu Dhabi, United Arab Emirates
- Course: Permanent racing facility 5.554 km (3.451 mi)

Feature race
- Date: 30 November 2019
- Laps: 29
Pole position
Driver	(Brazil) Sérgio Sette Câmara	DAMS
Time	1:49.751	
Podium
First	(Brazil) Sérgio Sette Câmara	DAMS
Second	(Japan) Nobuharu Matsushita	Carlin
Third	(China) Guanyu Zhou	UNI-Virtuosi Racing
Fastest lap
Driver	(China) Guanyu Zhou	UNI-Virtuosi Racing
- Time: 1:54.077 (on lap 30)

Sprint race
- Date: 1 December 2019
- Laps: 21
Podium
First	(Italy) Luca Ghiotto	UNI-Virtuosi Racing
Second	(Canada) Nicholas Latifi	DAMS
Third	(Brazil) Sérgio Sette Câmara	DAMS
Fastest lap
Driver	(Canada) Nicholas Latifi	DAMS
- Time: 1:55.526 (on lap 6)

The 2019 Yas Island Formula 2 round was a pair of motor races held on 30 November and 1 December 2019 at the Yas Marina Circuit in Abu Dhabi, United Arab Emirates as part of the FIA Formula 2 Championship. It was the twelfth and final race of the 2019 FIA Formula 2 Championship and was run in support of the 2019 Abu Dhabi Grand Prix.

== Classifications ==
=== Qualifying ===
Pos.	No.	Driver	Team	Time	Gap	Grid
1	5	(Brazil) Sérgio Sette Câmara	DAMS	1:49.751	–	1
2	11	(United Kingdom) Callum Ilott	Sauber Junior Team by Charouz	1:49.840	+0.089	2
3	1	(Switzerland) Louis Delétraz	Carlin	1:49.931	+0.180	3
4	2	(Japan) Nobuharu Matsushita	Carlin	1:50.157	+0.406	4
5	7	(China) Guanyu Zhou	UNI-Virtuosi Racing	1:50.190	+0.439	5
6	4	(Netherlands) Nyck de Vries	ART Grand Prix	1:50.288	+0.537	6
7	6	(Canada) Nicholas Latifi	DAMS	1:50.303	+0.552	7
8	15	(United Kingdom) Jack Aitken	Campos Racing	1:50.520	+0.769	8
9	3	(Russia) Nikita Mazepin	ART Grand Prix	1:50.618	+0.867	9
10	9	(Germany) Mick Schumacher	Prema Racing	1:50.652	+0.901	10
11	8	(Italy) Luca Ghiotto	UNI-Virtuosi Racing	1:50.858	+1.107	11
12	20	(France) Giuliano Alesi	Trident	1:50.920	+1.169	12
13	16	(United Kingdom) Jordan King	MP Motorsport	1:51.174	+1.423	13
14	22	(Russia) Artem Markelov	BWT Arden	1:51.412	+1.661	14
15	12	(Russia) Matevos Isaakyan	Sauber Junior Team by Charouz	1:51.522	+1.771	15
16	14	(Japan) Marino Sato	Campos Racing	1:51.829	+2.078	16
17	10	(Indonesia) Sean Gelael	Prema Racing	1:51.884	+2.133	17
18	21	(Denmark) Christian Lundgaard	Trident	1:52.140	+2.389	18
19	18	(Colombia) Tatiana Calderón	BWT Arden	1:52.412	+2.661	19
20	17	(India) Mahaveer Raghunathan	MP Motorsport	1:53.363	+3.612	20

=== Feature Race ===
Pos.	No.	Driver	Team	Laps	Time/Retired	Grid	Points
1	5	(Brazil) Sérgio Sette Câmara	DAMS	29	1:02:17.011	1	25 (4)
2	2	(Japan) Nobuharu Matsushita	Carlin	29	+5.149	4	18
3	7	(China) Guanyu Zhou	UNI-Virtuosi Racing	29	+7.765	5	15 (2)
4	1	(Switzerland) Louis Delétraz	Carlin	29	+10.919	3	12
5	11	(United Kingdom) Callum Ilott	Sauber Junior Team by Charouz	29	+15.981	2	10
6	8	(Italy) Luca Ghiotto	UNI-Virtuosi Racing	29	+20.385	11	8
7	6	(Canada) Nicholas Latifi	DAMS	29	+25.785	7	6
8	20	(France) Giuliano Alesi	Trident	29	+32.249	12	4
9	9	(Germany) Mick Schumacher	Prema Racing	29	+41.942	10	2
10	3	(Russia) Nikita Mazepin	ART Grand Prix	29	+48.680	9	1
11	15	(United Kingdom) Jack Aitken	Campos Racing	29	+49.860	8	
12	16	(United Kingdom) Jordan King	MP Motorsport	29	+50.479	13	
13	4	(Netherlands) Nyck de Vries	ART Grand Prix	29	+53.455	6	
14	21	(Denmark) Christian Lundgaard	Trident	29	+53.963	18	
15	12	(Russia) Matevos Isaakyan	Sauber Junior Team by Charouz	29	+56.593	15	
16	18	(Colombia) Tatiana Calderón	BWT Arden	29	+58.602	19	
17	10	(Indonesia) Sean Gelael	Prema Racing	29	+1:02.900	17	
18	14	(Japan) Marino Sato	Campos Racing	29	+1:37.470	16	
DNF	22	(Russia) Artem Markelov	BWT Arden	14	Engine	14	
DNF	17	(India) Mahaveer Raghunathan	MP Motorsport	10	Spin	20	
Fastest lap: Guanyu Zhou (UNI-Virtuosi Racing) - 1:54.077 (on lap 30)

=== Sprint Race ===
Pos.	No.	Driver	Team	Laps	Time/Retired	Grid	Points
1	8	(Italy) Luca Ghiotto	UNI-Virtuosi Racing	21	44:22.552	3	15
2	6	(Canada) Nicholas Latifi	DAMS	21	+7.274	2	12 (2)
3	5	(Brazil) Sérgio Sette Câmara	DAMS	21	+10.235	8	10
4	11	(United Kingdom) Callum Ilott	Sauber Junior Team by Charouz	21	+16.106	4	8
5	20	(France) Giuliano Alesi	Trident	21	+17.273	1	6
6	1	(Switzerland) Louis Delétraz	Carlin	21	+19.451	5	4
7	2	(Japan) Nobuharu Matsushita	Carlin	21	+28.230	7	2
8	7	(China) Guanyu Zhou	UNI-Virtuosi Racing	21	+29.112	6	1
9	16	(United Kingdom) Jordan King	MP Motorsport	21	+31.532	12	
10	15	(United Kingdom) Jack Aitken	Campos Racing	21	+32.075	11	
11	9	(Germany) Mick Schumacher	Prema Racing	21	+33.578	9	
12	21	(Denmark) Christian Lundgaard	Trident	21	+37.018	14	
13	4	(Netherlands) Nyck de Vries	ART Grand Prix	21	+40.436	13	
14	18	(Colombia) Tatiana Calderón	BWT Arden	21	+43.149	16	
15	17	(India) Mahaveer Raghunathan	MP Motorsport	21	+52.593	20	
16	14	(Japan) Marino Sato	Campos Racing	21	+59.719	18	
DNF	3	(Russia) Nikita Mazepin	ART Grand Prix	19	Collision damage	10	
DNF	12	(Russia) Matevos Isaakyan	Sauber Junior Team by Charouz	18	Collision	15	
DNF	10	(Indonesia) Sean Gelael	Prema Racing	16	Engine	17	
DNF	22	(Russia) Artem Markelov	BWT Arden	10	Gearbox	19	
Fastest lap: Nicholas Latifi (DAMS) - 1:55.526 (on lap 6)

== Final championship standings ==
Drivers' Championship standings

Pos.	Driver	Points
1	(Netherlands) Nyck de Vries	266
2	(Canada) Nicholas Latifi	214
3	(Italy) Luca Ghiotto	207
4	(Brazil) Sérgio Sette Câmara	204
5	(United Kingdom) Jack Aitken	159

Teams' Championship standings

Pos.	Team	Points
1	(France) DAMS	418
2	(United Kingdom) UNI-Virtuosi	347
3	(France) ART Grand Prix	277
4	(United Kingdom) Carlin	236
5	(Spain) Campos Racing	189

== See also ==
- 2019 Abu Dhabi Grand Prix

Previous round: 2019 Sochi Formula 2 round	FIA Formula 2 Championship; 2019 season	Next round: 2020 Spielberg Formula 2 round
Previous round: 2018 Yas Island Formula 2 round	Yas Island Formula 2 round	Next round: 2021 Yas Island Formula 2 round
