= 2017 Yas Island Formula 2 round =

Car racing competition

(United Arab Emirates) 2017 Yas Marina Formula 2 round
Round details
- Round 11 of 11 in the 2017 FIA Formula 2 Championship.
- Layout of the Yas Marina Circuit
- Location: Yas Marina Circuit, Abu Dhabi, United Arab Emirates
- Course: Permanent racing facility 5.554 km (3.451 mi)

Feature race
- Date: 25 November 2017
- Laps: 31
Pole position
Driver	(Russia) Artem Markelov	Russian Time
Time	1:47.181	
Podium
First	(Russia) Artem Markelov	Russian Time
Second	(Monaco) Charles Leclerc	Prema Racing
Third	(Italy) Luca Ghiotto	Russian Time
Fastest lap
Driver	(Thailand) Alexander Albon	ART Grand Prix
- Time: 1:50.314 (on lap 27)

Sprint race
- Date: 26 November 2017
- Laps: 22
Podium
First	(Monaco) Charles Leclerc	Prema Racing
Second	(Thailand) Alexander Albon	ART Grand Prix
Third	(Canada) Nicholas Latifi	DAMS
Fastest lap
Driver	(Canada) Nicholas Latifi	DAMS
- Time: 1:51.875 (on lap 4)

The 2017 Yas Marina FIA Formula 2 round was a pair of motor races held on 25 and 26 November 2017 at the Yas Marina Circuit in Abu Dhabi, United Arab Emirates as part of the FIA Formula 2 Championship. It was the final round of the 2017 FIA Formula 2 Championship and was run in support of the 2017 Abu Dhabi Grand Prix.

This was the final event for the Dallara GP2/11 chassis that was introduced at the 2011 Yas Marina Circuit GP2 Asia Series round and also the final event for the Mecachrome V8 engine package that had been part of the GP2 Series and FIA Formula 2 since its formation in 2005. The Dallara F2 2018 chassis with a Mecachrome V6 turbocharged engine was introduced for the 2018 Formula 2 Championship onwards.

== Classifications ==
=== Qualifying ===
Pos.	No.	Driver	Team	Time	Gap	Grid
1	6	(Russia) Artem Markelov	Russian Time	1:47.181	—	1
2	3	(Netherlands) Nyck de Vries	Racing Engineering	1:47.387	+0.206	2
3	2	(Italy) Antonio Fuoco	Prema Racing	1:47.575	+0.394	3
4	9	(United Kingdom) Oliver Rowland	DAMS	1:47.617	+0.436	4
5	20	(France) Norman Nato	Arden International	1:47.676	+0.495	5
6	1	(Monaco) Charles Leclerc	Prema Racing	1:47.692	+0.511	6
7	5	(Italy) Luca Ghiotto	Russian Time	1:47.753	+0.572	7
8	7	(Japan) Nobuharu Matsushita	ART Grand Prix	1:47.759	+0.578	8
9	14	(Brazil) Sérgio Sette Câmara	MP Motorsport	1:47.824	+0.643	9
EX	8	(Thailand) Alexander Albon	ART Grand Prix	1:47.957	+0.776	20
10	12	(Japan) Álex Palou	Campos Racing	1:48.127	+0.946	10
11	10	(Canada) Nicholas Latifi	DAMS	1:48.201	+1.020	11
12	18	(Switzerland) Louis Delétraz	Rapax	1:48.212	+1.031	12
13	11	(United Kingdom) Lando Norris	Campos Racing	1:48.404	+1.223	13
14	15	(United Kingdom) Jordan King	MP Motorsport	1:48.476	+1.295	14
15	17	(United States) Santino Ferrucci	Trident	1:48.538	+1.357	15
16	21	(Indonesia) Sean Gelael	Arden International	1:48.609	+1.428	16
17	4	(Sweden) Gustav Malja	Racing Engineering	1:48.671	+1.490	17
18	19	(Spain) Roberto Merhi	Rapax	1:48.794	+1.613	18
19	16	(Malaysia) Nabil Jeffri	Trident	1:50.201	+3.020	19

=== Feature Race ===
Pos.	No.	Driver	Team	Laps	Time/Retired	Grid	Points
1	6	(Russia) Artem Markelov	Russian Time	31	59:34.767	1	25 (4)
2	1	(Monaco) Charles Leclerc	Prema Racing	31	+16.265	6	18
3	5	(Italy) Luca Ghiotto	Russian Time	31	+25.438	7	15
4	3	(Netherlands) Nyck de Vries	Racing Engineering	31	+27.181	2	12
5	10	(Canada) Nicholas Latifi	DAMS	31	+29.697	11	10
6	7	(Japan) Nobuharu Matsushita	ART Grand Prix	31	+31.974	8	8
7	8	(Thailand) Alexander Albon	ART Grand Prix	31	+34.618	20	6 (2)
8	15	(United Kingdom) Jordan King	MP Motorsport	31	+40.639	14	4
9	14	(Brazil) Sérgio Sette Câmara	MP Motorsport	31	+43.305	9	2
10	18	(Switzerland) Louis Delétraz	Rapax	31	+52.356	12	1
11	4	(Sweden) Gustav Malja	Racing Engineering	31	+1:01.198	17	
12	12	(Japan) Álex Palou	Campos Racing	31	+1:04.596	10	
13	20	(France) Norman Nato	Arden International	31	+1:12.209	5	
14	17	(United States) Santino Ferrucci	Trident	31	+1:21.496	15	
15	21	(Indonesia) Sean Gelael	Arden International	31	+1:23.795	16	
16	19	(Spain) Roberto Merhi	Rapax	30	+1 lap	18	
DNF	11	(United Kingdom) Lando Norris	Campos Racing	5	Engine	13	
DNF	16	(Malaysia) Nabil Jeffri	Trident	0	Wheel nut	19	
DSQ	9	(United Kingdom) Oliver Rowland	DAMS	31	Disqualified	4	
DSQ	2	(Italy) Antonio Fuoco	Prema Racing	31	Disqualified	3	
Fastest lap: (Thailand) Alexander Albon (ART Grand Prix) – 1:50.314 (on lap 27)

=== Sprint Race ===
Pos.	No.	Driver	Team	Laps	Time/Retired	Grid	Points
1	1	(Monaco) Charles Leclerc	Prema Racing	22	41:36.188	7	15
2	8	(Thailand) Alexander Albon	ART Grand Prix	22	+1.293	2	12
3	10	(Canada) Nicholas Latifi	DAMS	22	+3.207	4	10 (2)
4	7	(Japan) Nobuharu Matsushita	ART Grand Prix	22	+4.105	3	8
5	5	(Italy) Luca Ghiotto	Russian Time	22	+4.952	6	6
6	6	(Russia) Artem Markelov	Russian Time	22	+14.758	8	4
7	9	(United Kingdom) Oliver Rowland	DAMS	22	+15.446	19	2
8	14	(Brazil) Sérgio Sette Câmara	MP Motorsport	22	+24.795	9	1
9	3	(Netherlands) Nyck de Vries	Racing Engineering	22	+29.261	5	
10	19	(Spain) Roberto Merhi	Rapax	22	+29.689	16	
11	2	(Italy) Antonio Fuoco	Prema Racing	22	+29.912	20	
12	12	(Japan) Álex Palou	Campos Racing	22	+30.999	12	
13	11	(United Kingdom) Lando Norris	Campos Racing	22	+31.564	17	
14	21	(Indonesia) Sean Gelael	Arden International	22	+38.714	15	
15	17	(United States) Santino Ferrucci	Trident	22	+39.605	14	
16	16	(Malaysia) Nabil Jeffri	Trident	22	+43.310	18	
17	4	(Sweden) Gustav Malja	Racing Engineering	22	+49.659	11	
18	20	(France) Norman Nato	Arden International	19	Throttle	13	
DNF	18	(Switzerland) Louis Delétraz	Rapax	18	Mechanical	10	
DNF	15	(United Kingdom) Jordan King	MP Motorsport	11	Transmission	1	
Fastest lap: (Canada) Nicholas Latifi (DAMS) – 1:51.875 (on lap 4)

== Final championship standings ==
Drivers' Championship standings

	Pos.	Driver	Points
	1	(Monaco) Charles Leclerc	282
1	2	(Russia) Artem Markelov	210
1	3	(United Kingdom) Oliver Rowland	191
	4	(Italy) Luca Ghiotto	185
	5	(Canada) Nicholas Latifi	178

Teams' Championship standings

	Pos.	Team	Points
1	1	(Russia) Russian Time	395
1	2	(Italy) Prema Racing	380
1	3	(France) DAMS	369
	4	(France) ART Grand Prix	226
	5	(Italy) Rapax	137

- Note: Only the top five positions are included for both sets of standings.

== See also ==
- 2017 Abu Dhabi Grand Prix
- 2017 Yas Marina GP3 Series round

Previous round: 2017 Jerez Formula 2 round	FIA Formula 2 Championship; 2017 season	Next round: 2018 Bahrain Formula 2 round
Previous round: 2016 Yas Marina GP2 Series round	Yas Island Formula 2 round	Next round: 2018 Yas Island Formula 2 round
