= Olli Caldwell =

British racing driver (born 2002)

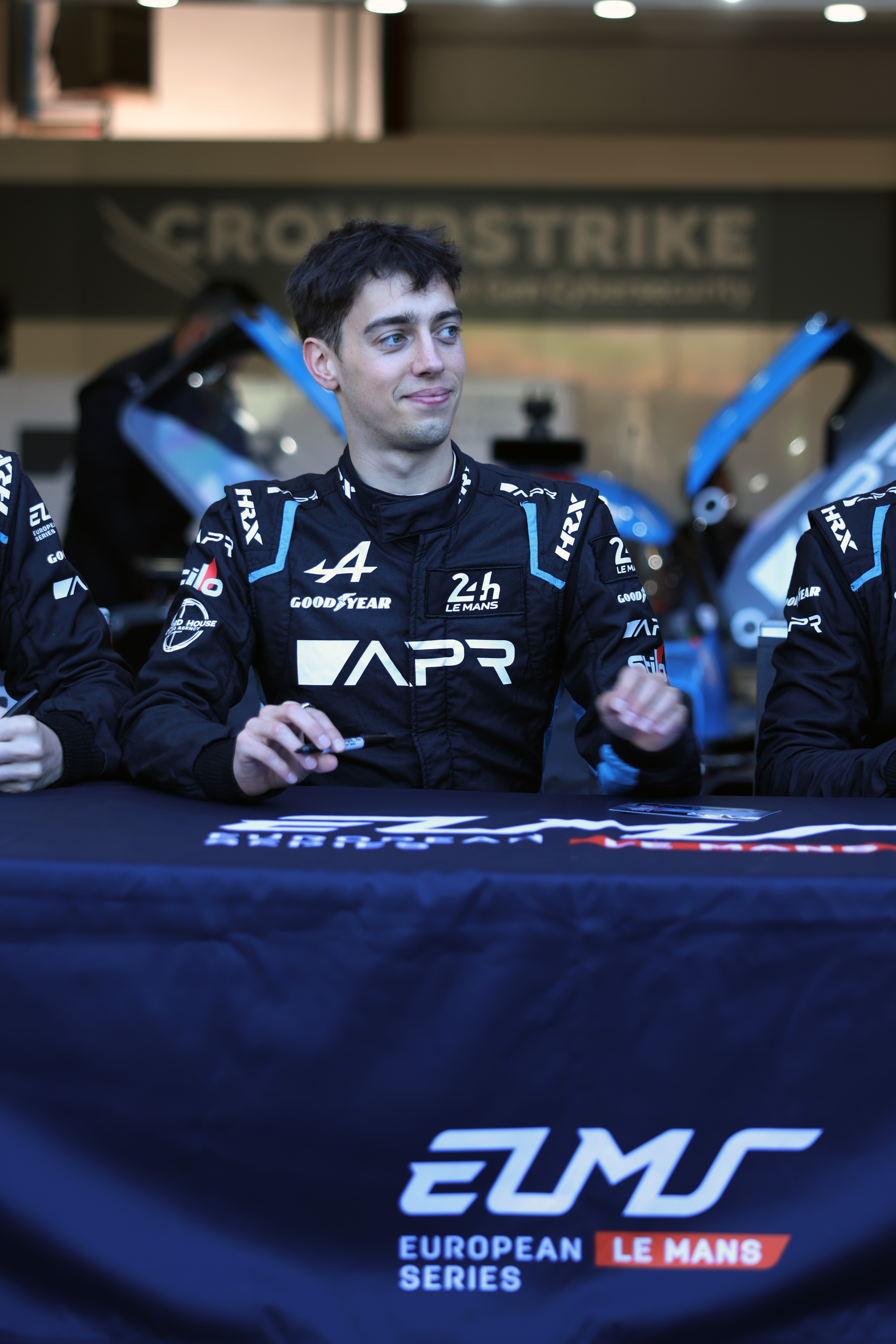
- Caldwell in 2024
- Nationality: (United Kingdom) British
- Born: Oliver William Caldwell; 11 June 2002 (age 24) Winchester, United Kingdom

European Le Mans Series career
- Debut season: 2023
- Current team: Algarve Pro Racing
- Categorisation: FIA Silver (until 2021); FIA Gold (2022–)
- Car number: 20
- Former teams: Inter Europol Competition
- Starts: 18 (18 entries)
- Wins: 2
- Podiums: 7
- Poles: 0
- Fastest laps: 1
- Best finish: 2nd in 2025 (LMP2 Pro-Am)

Previous series
- 2021, 2023; 2021–2022; 2020–2021; 2019; 2017–18; 2017–18; 2017–18; 2017; 2016: FIA WEC - LMP2; FIA Formula 2; FIA Formula 3; FR European; F4 UAE; Italian F4; ADAC F4; F4 British; Ginetta Junior

Oliver "Olli" William Caldwell (born 11 June 2002) is a British racing driver who currently competes in the LMP2 class of the European Le Mans Series with Algarve Pro Racing.

Caldwell is a race winner in the FIA Formula 3, Formula Regional European, Italian F4 and ADAC Formula 4 championships, won the 2018 Gulf 12 Hours in the GT4 category, and was formerly part of the Alpine Academy. In February 2025, Caldwell took his first prototype victory at the 4 Hours of Dubai.

== Career ==
=== Karting ===
Caldwell was born in Hampshire and began karting in 2013 at the age of eleven. Having raced in karts for four seasons, Caldwell finished third in the 2016 edition of the Rotax Euro Challenge and took part in the Rotax Max Challenge Grand Finals in the same year, representing Great Britain at the latter competition.

=== Ginetta Junior Championship ===
In 2016, Caldwell progressed into car racing, driving for JHR Developments in the second half of the Ginetta Junior Championship. Having scored a rookie podium on his debut, the Brit would finish all but two of his thirteen races in the top-ten, ending up 19th in the overall standings.

=== Formula 4 ===
==== F4 British Championship ====
Having taken part in multiple tests of the F4 British Championship in the first half of 2017, Caldwell made his single-seater debut at the Croft Circuit with Arden, which, as he had missed the opening third of the campaign due to age requirements, made him the youngest ever participant in a British F4 race at the age of fifteen. He competed in the series for the remainder of that year, finishing 14th with a highest race finish of seventh.

==== ADAC Formula 4 ====
That same year, Caldwell made his debut in the ADAC Formula 4 Championship, driving for ADAC Berlin-Brandenburg e.V. in two weekends.

In 2018, Caldwell made the full-time switch to Prema where he finished in seventh on 125 points, scoring four podiums, with one of them being his only win of the season at Oschersleben.

==== Italian F4 Championship ====
Mücke Motorsport was the team Caldwell made his Italian F4 debut for in 2017. In the fifteen races he competed in he recorded ten points, with a highest placing of sixth in the final race at Monza helping him to 11th in the standings.

In 2018, Caldwell switched to the Italian outfit Prema Powerteam, partnering Enzo Fittipaldi and Gianluca Petecof for the entire season. A disappointing opening weekend, was cancelled out by two podiums, a pole position and a race win in France. Three podiums from the Monza races put Caldwell into the championship hunt, though the following two rounds only yielded one podium finish. However, a dominant weekend at Vallelunga, where Caldwell scored all three victories after qualifying on pole for every race, gave him a fighting chance for the season finale at Mugello. There, two podiums would not be enough to claim the title, as Caldwell finished third in the standings.

==== Formula 4 UAE ====
Caldwell competed in the F4 UAE Championship for Silberpfeil Energy Dubai in preparation for his 2018 season. He would only race in the first two rounds, winning three races and ending up seventh in the championship.

=== Formula Regional European Championship ===
In 2019, Caldwell remained with Prema, progressing to FREC alongside Enzo Fittipaldi and Frederik Vesti. Having started his season with a fourth-placed finish in race 1 of Le Castellet, the Brit took a lights-to-flag victory in race 2, although he was later disqualified for a technical infringement on his car. At the following round in Vallelunga the Briton scored a podium in the second race, before ending up on the rostrum in all three races at the Hungaroring. In Austria, a charging drive during race 2 was stopped due to a faulty gearbox, costing him his "best chance of a win".

Caldwell bounced back in Imola, where, despite a crash in race 3, he would score two second places in the opening two races of the weekend and win in race 4, which was held as a re-run of the cancelled third race at Vallelunga. As this had been the weekend during which F2 driver Anthoine Hubert had been killed at Spa, Caldwell decided to dedicate his victory to the late Frenchman. In Barcelona, Caldwell was fighting for a podium position in race 1 until being forced into the gravel by Fittipaldi. At the next round in Mugello, Caldwell experienced his worst weekend of the season, scoring a mere three points and getting his first and only non-points finish of the season. He ended his campaign with three top-eight finishes at Monza, as Caldwell finished fifth in the championship.

=== FIA Formula 3 Championship ===
==== Macau Grand Prix ====
At the end of 2019, Caldwell raced at the 2019 Macau Grand Prix with Trident. He qualified 17th before being caught up in an incident during the qualifying race, which dropped him to 23rd ahead of the main race. At the start of the race Caldwell made contact with Andreas Estner, which later caused him to retire due with front wing and tyre damage.

==== 2020 ====
In January, Caldwell was announced by Trident as one of their three drivers for the 2020 Formula 3 season, partnering the experienced pairing of David Beckmann and Lirim Zendeli. The Brit had a successful start to the year, finishing in the top six in both races at the second round at Spielberg. Unfortunately, Caldwell then had to endure four successive rounds without any points, a run that included him being spun out in the feature race at Silverstone. Caldwell managed to break that streak by finishing seventh in the Barcelona feature race. His final points of the year came at the penultimate round in Monza, and he ended up 16th in the drivers' standings.

==== 2021 ====
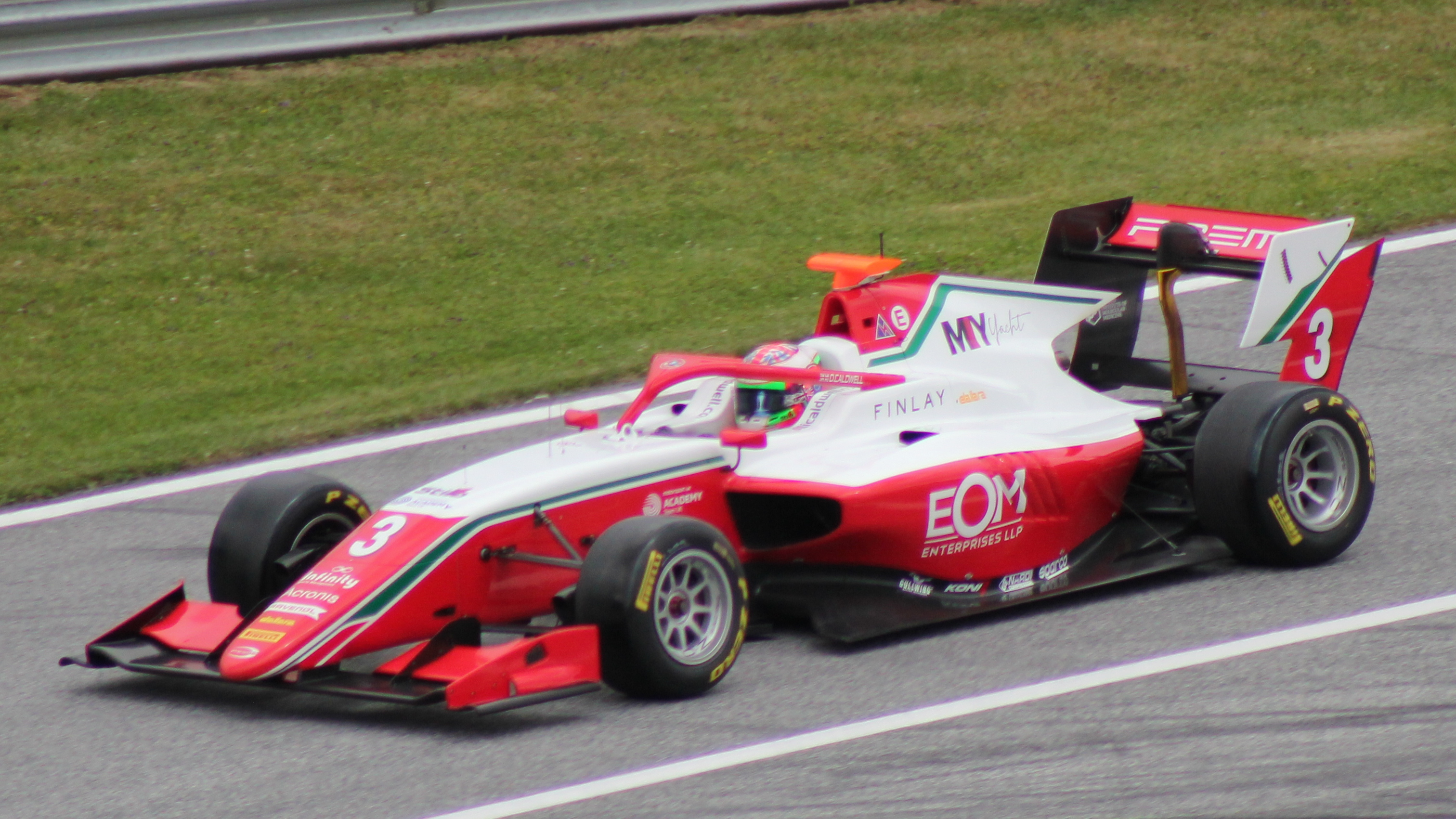
Caldwell at the 2021 Spielberg Formula 3 round.

Caldwell was announced to be racing for Prema Racing in the 2021 season, partnering Arthur Leclerc and Dennis Hauger. He won the second race of the season in Barcelona, after inheriting the race lead when the leading pair of Hauger and Matteo Nannini collided on the penultimate lap. Caldwell held off a charging Victor Martins on the final lap to take his first F3 victory. After scoring points in France, Caldwell returned to the podium at Spielberg, where he finished second in race one and third in race three, where he made his way past five cars on the way to the rostrum. Caldwell's next podium finish occurred at the next race in Budapest, with him being promoted to second place after initial race winner Lorenzo Colombo received a five-second penalty. A collision with Oliver Rasmussen in race 2 scuppered his hopes of scoring points, although he came back to eighth place in the feature race. However, a disappointing weekend at Spa where the whole team qualified outside the top-12, a broken DRS in qualifying at Zandvoort and the decision to choose a wet-weather setup in Sochi, where the races were held in dry conditions despite the predicted rain, meant that Caldwell failed to score a podium in the final rounds. Caldwell ended his campaign eighth in the drivers' standings, two places ahead of teammate Leclerc.

=== FIA Formula 2 Championship ===
==== 2021 ====
In November 2021, Caldwell announced that he would be joining Campos Racing to partner Ralph Boschung in the final two rounds of the FIA Formula 2 Championship. After the final round, where he set a fastest lap in the first sprint race following a late stop after a racing incident with Jake Hughes, Caldwell took part in the post-season test with the Spanish team.

==== 2022 ====
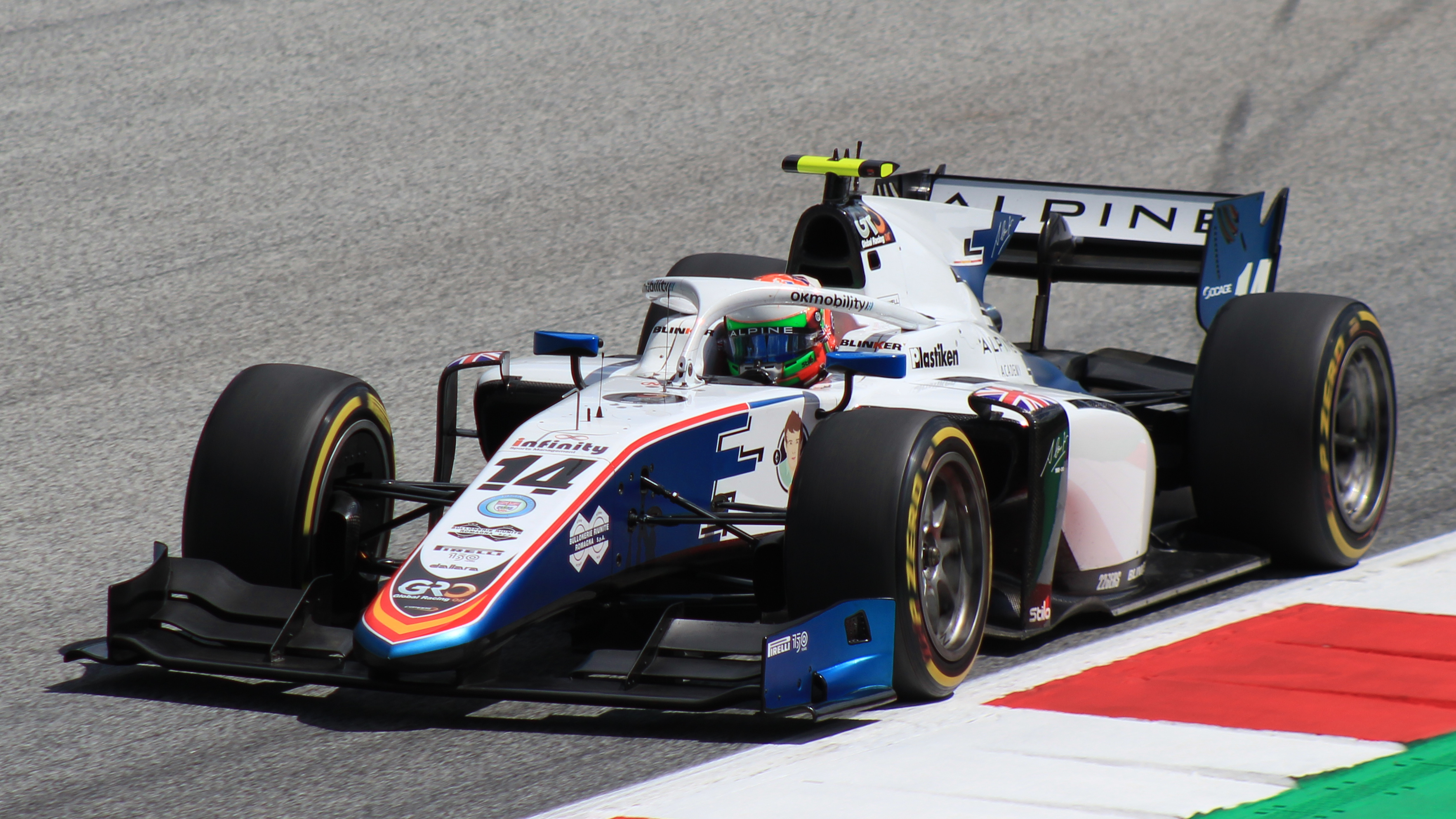
Caldwell in his Dallara F2 2018 during the 2022 Spielberg F2 round

Caldwell stepped up to Formula 2 full-time for the 2022 season, remaining with Campos and still having Boschung as his teammate. The season began with an engine issue in the sprint race at Bahrain, a race that was followed up by a penalty-strewn Sunday, where Caldwell collected a total of seven penalty points for being out of position on the formation lap and exceeding the track limits at turn 4 several times. The subsequent six rounds did not yield points, though Caldwell outqualified Boschung for the first time at his home track at Silverstone. At the Red Bull Ring however, Caldwell would get up to eleventh by the end of the race after starting last, which eventually became sixth after penalties ahead of him had been handed out. In the qualifying session at the Hungaroring, Caldwell managed to qualify 13th and finished tenth in the sprint race, but retired from the feature race after running out of fuel. Near the race's end, he also committed a track limits infringement, earning him a twelfth penalty point and excluding him from the round at Spa. Caldwell later apologised to his team.

On his return at Zandvoort, Caldwell outqualified teammate Boschung, but retired from the sprint race with brake issues. In the feature race, he took advantage of a pileup at the Safety car restart to finish ninth, having held off attacks from Jehan Daruvala, and was elevated to eighth following a penalty ahead. The next round at Monza would bring two retirements due to respective lap 1 collisions, before Caldwell retired at Abu Dhabi with a mechanical issue. Caldwell ended up finishing 21st in the standings with 12 points to his name.

=== Formula One ===
In February 2022, the Alpine F1 Team announced that Caldwell would be joining the team's academy, alongside former F3 rivals Jack Doohan, Victor Martins and Caio Collet. On the 14 June it was confirmed that Caldwell would drive the team's 2021 car, the Alpine A521, at his home track in Silverstone in a test, taking over from Alpine reserve driver Oscar Piastri the following day. He completed a total of 485.7 kilometres of running throughout the day. In November of the same year Caldwell tested the car once again, completing more than 100 laps around the Bahrain International Circuit. At the start of 2023, it was announced that Caldwell had graduated from the Alpine Academy.

== Sportscar racing ==
=== GT appearances ===
At the end of 2018, Caldwell made his GT racing debut in the Gulf 12 Hours, where, having taken the Race 1 win by leading after 6 Hours of the race, he took victory in the GT4 category, driving a Mercedes for Bullitt Racing alongside Ian Loggie and Oleg Kharuk.

In early 2020 it was confirmed that Caldwell would drive alongside Marvin Kirchhöfer and Luca Ghiotto in the Bathurst 12 Hour race for R-Motorsport. However, the trio was forced to miss the race as a crash from Kirchhöfer in the second part of qualifying broke the Vantage AMR GT3 car, which forced the team to withdraw from the event. Despite the premature withdrawal, Caldwell described the event as "an amazing experience".

=== 2021-22: Prototype debut ===
On 3 November 2021, it was announced that Caldwell would be making his debut in the FIA World Endurance Championship, driving alongside Miro Konôpka and Nelson Panciatici for the ARC Bratislava team in the 8 Hours of Bahrain. The trio finished the race eleventh in the LMP2 category.

The following year, Caldwell competed in the series' rookie test at Bahrain in November, driving the Richard Mille Racing Team LMP2 car during the afternoon session. He ended up setting the second-fastest time of all rookies in the category.

=== 2023: Alpine LMP2 programme ===
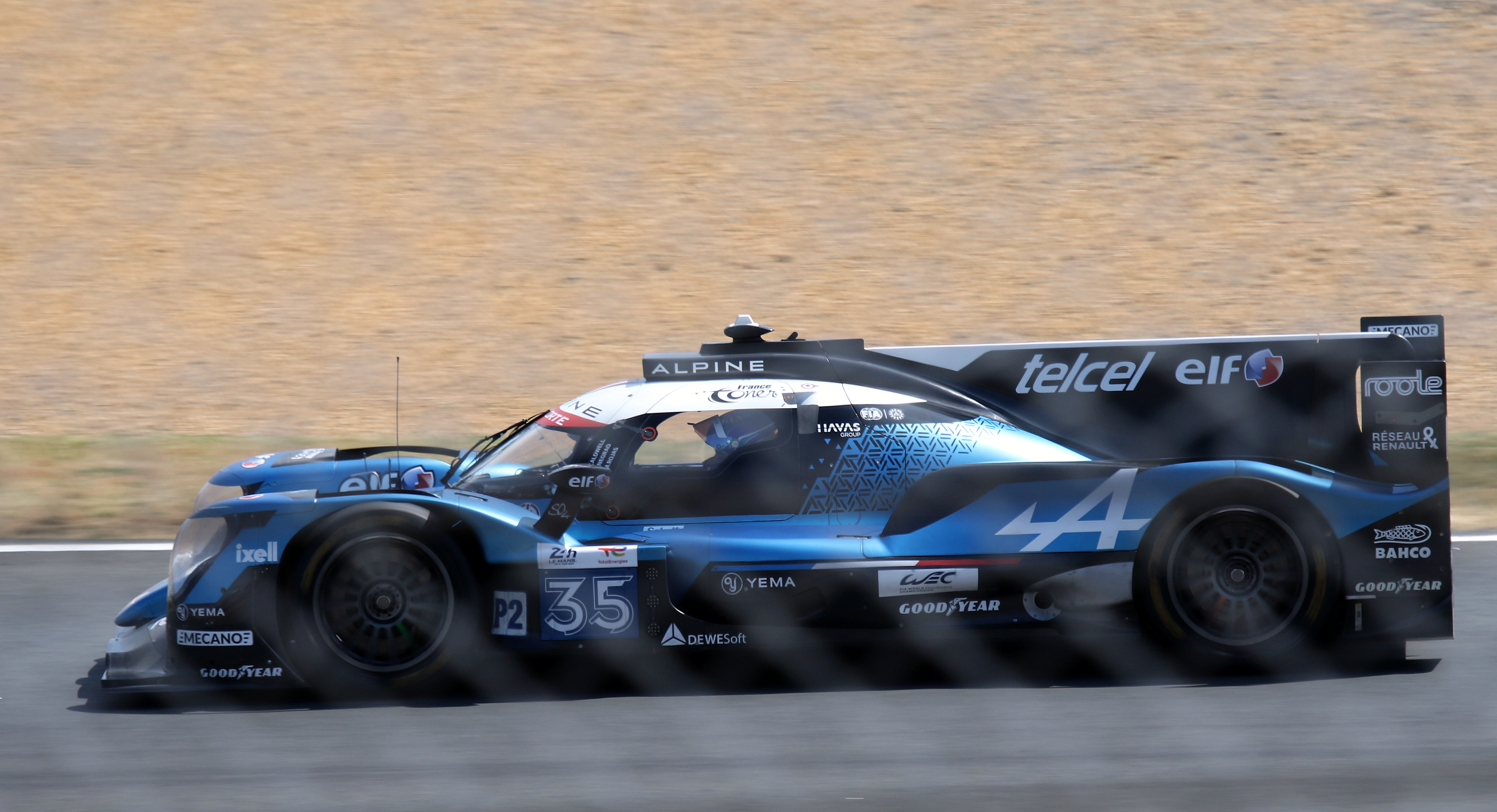
Caldwell in the Alpine Oreca 07 at the 2023 24 Hours of Le Mans.

For the 2023 season, Caldwell moved into the WEC, partnering André Negrão and Memo Rojas for the Alpine Elf Team in the LMP2 class. In addition, he signed a factory contract with the brand. The campaign began disappointingly at Sebring, where Caldwell was forced to retire after five hours due to an electrical issue. Caldwell experienced a more positive race at Portimão, as he overtook Oliver Rasmussen during his first stint. The team eventually finished eleventh. Caldwell would be handed qualifying duties at Spa, where he managed to place himself ahead of Charles Milesi in the sister car, before contributing to take eighth on a damp track on Saturday. Summing up the season until that point, Caldwell admitted that the campaign had proven to be "difficult", as Alpine were still trying to catch up with the frontrunners.

The 24 Hours of Le Mans saw the No. 35 cycle towards the front during the first few hours owing to a fortuitous pit strategy just before Caldwell entered the car. Having defended fourth against Ben Barnicoat for a number of laps, Caldwell took third place during his second stint as a result of an accident ahead, and held the spot until leaving the car at midnight. Laps later, with Rojas in the car, the No. 35 collided with the No. 66 JMW and No. 7 Toyota, forcing the team to repair the car and serve a penalty, losing them several laps. The team finished the race ninth in the LMP2 class. Monza saw Caldwell once again outqualify Milesi, though a mistimed safety car period would relegate the car to eighth. The team scored one further points-scoring result in the final two races on their way to 11th in the teams' standings.

During the same year, Caldwell also raced in the European Le Mans Series with Inter Europol Competition alongside Jonathan Aberdein and Rui Andrade. The team retired due to a gearbox issue at the season-opener, however they would bounce back at Le Castellet. Caldwell qualified fourth and - in spite of a drive-through penalty caused by contact from Andrade and an emergency fuel stop under safety car conditions - helped his team to score a podium finish in the LMP2 Pro class. At Aragón, Caldwell qualified third, though the team's podium chances were squashed due to contact with the Ferrari of Johnny Laursen. Despite fighting for the podium at Spa, the team once again went scoreless thanks to a late crash caused by Aberdein. At the finale in Portimão, Caldwell qualified a season-best second for Friday's race, though the team fell back early and eventually ended up sixth after a driving time penalty, though they bounced back to finish fourth on Sunday.

=== 2024: Sophomore ELMS Season ===
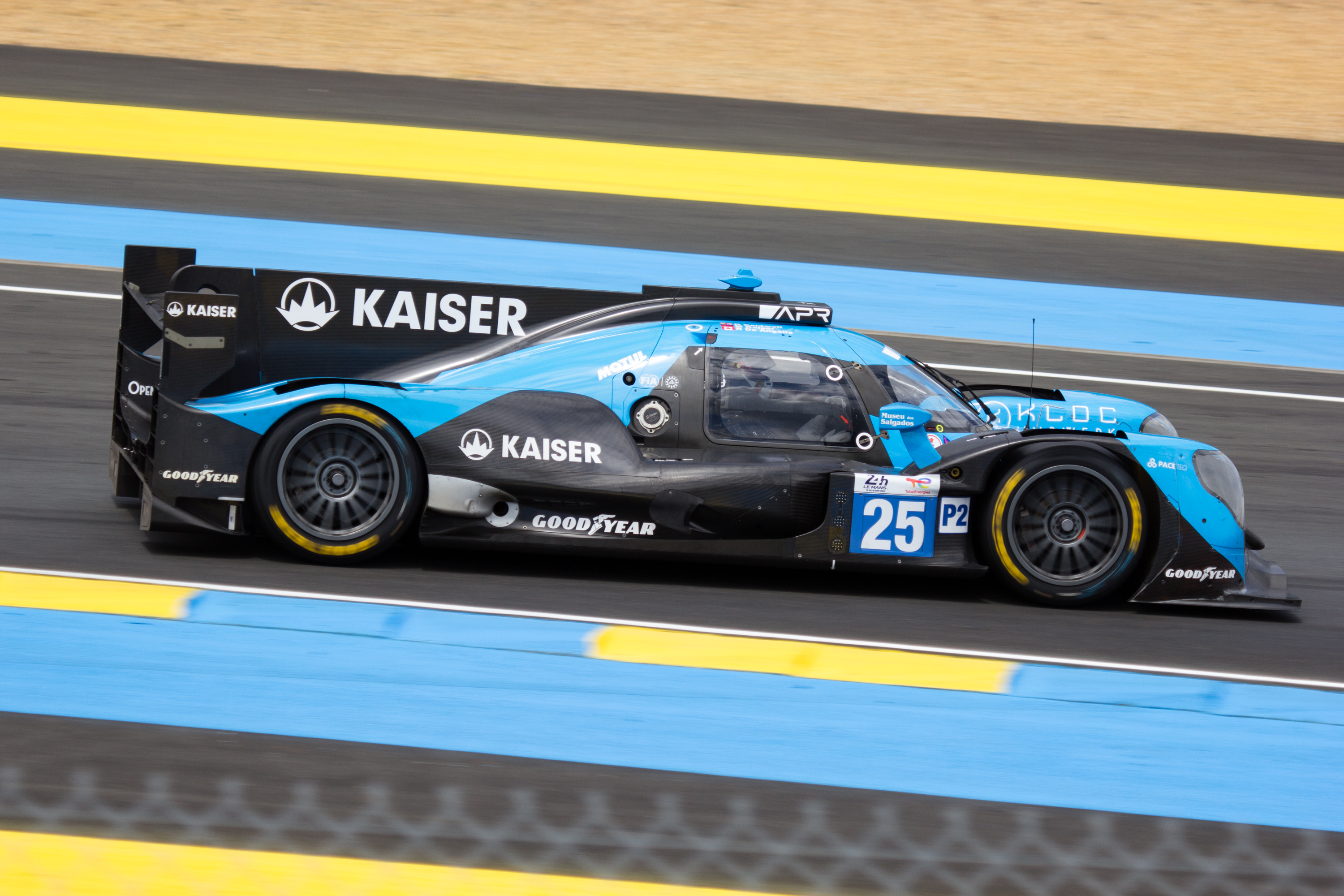
Caldwell's No. 25 car at the 2024 24 Hours of Le Mans

Moving away from Alpine, Caldwell joined reigning ELMS champions Algarve Pro Racing for his second season in the ELMS, partnering Matthias Kaiser and title winner Alex Lynn. At the season-opener in Barcelona, the Briton charged into the lead during his stint, using traffic to pass Ritomo Miyata, before a quicker pit stop ended up dropping APR back to second, the position in which they eventually finished. In Le Castellet, Caldwell set the fastest lap of all Pro class entries, finishing seventh. Caldwell and Kaiser would be joined by Roman De Angelis for the 24 Hours of Le Mans, as Alex Lynn attended to his Hypercar duties with Cadillac. The trio finished eighth in class, losing two laps in the first hour after Caldwell tagged a barrier, which necessitated repairs.

The European season continued with eighth place at Imola, where a poorly-timed virtual safety car forced the team to play catch-up during the final hour. More misfortune befell Algarve Pro at Spa, as they finished several laps down after collecting the spinning GT Ferrari of John Hartshorne in the first stint. Despite Caldwell being overtaken for the lead by Macéo Capietto during a safety car restart at Mugello, an undercut on Panis Racing allowed the outfit to claim their second podium of the campaign, finishing second. Finally, eighth at Portimão meant that Caldwell and his teammates ended their year sat fifth in the drivers' standings.

Caldwell remained at the team for the Asian Le Mans Series held during the winter, driving alongside Alex Quinn and amateur-ranked Kriton Lendoudis. After finishing sixth in race one at Sepang, the trio benefited from a rain shower in race two, for which Algarve Pro had gambled correctly on wet-weather tyres, and subsequent race abandonment, leaving the No. 20 car of Caldwell in third whilst the sister No. 25 won. At the 4 Hours of Dubai, held in February 2025, Caldwell and his teammates finished third again in race 1. During race 2 of the weekend, Caldwell claimed his maiden LMP2 victory in a race headlined by multiple overtakes from Quinn and a late collision from the leading car, which allowed Quinn to take an uncontested lead. After finishing second during race 1 in Abu Dhabi thanks to a risky fuel saving strategy by Quinn, Caldwell put in a charging drive to pass several cars for a podium spot in race 2, before having his and the No. 20's chances of victory ended with a steering column issue. The team finished fourth overall.

=== 2025: Wins & ELMS title fight ===
Caldwell remained at APR for the 2025 ELMS season, partnering Quinn and Lendoudis. The trio finished second in class at the first round in Barcelona, coming home just behind the No. 25 sister car after a late safety car restart. At Le Castellet, both Caldwell and Quinn received penalties, leaving the team sixth in class. Caldwell pressed Dane Cameron for the lead during the middle part of the Imola race. Quinn later survived contact with Mathias Beche to hang on to third place. In Spa-Francorchamps, Caldwell battled for the class lead once again, this time chasing Oliver Jarvis. The No. 20 APR crew overcut its rivals at United Autosports later on, benefiting from a late Full-Course Yellow to take the win, Caldwell's first in the ELMS. This result also gave the team the championship lead. At Silverstone, a charging late drive by Quinn and well-timed red flag allowed Caldwell and his teammates to win again, being classed just over a tenth of a second ahead of the penalised AO by TF No. 99. Despite entering the season finale at Portimão with a nine-point gap to second in the standings, a collision between Caldwell and an Iron Lynx GT car caused Algarve Pro to finish last in class; the team ended up second in the Pro-Am championship.

=== 2026: Racing hiatus ===
At the start of 2026, Caldwell revealed that his racing plans for the upcoming season had fallen through, leaving him without a seat entering 2026. Caldwell remained connected to Algarve Pro by becoming a driver coach for the 2026 ELMS season.

== Personal life ==
In 2022, Caldwell lived in Oxford alongside Formula One reserve driver and former Mercedes Junior Frederik Vesti.

== Karting record ==
=== Karting career summary ===
Season	Series	Team	Position
2013	Super 1 National Championship — IAME Cadet	Eclipse Motorsport	NC
2013	Super 1 National Championship — Comer Cadet		9th
2014	Super 1 National Championship — Rotax Mini Max		22nd
2015	Rotax Max Wintercup — Rotax Max Junior	KR Sport	NC
2015	Super 1 National Championship — Rotax Mini Max	KR Sport	21st
2015	Rotax Max Euro Challenge — Junior	KR Sport	33rd
2016	Rotax Max Wintercup — Rotax Max Junior	KR Sport	30th
2016	Rotax International Open — Junior	KR Sport	9th
2016	BNL International Karting Series — Junior	KR Sport	17th
2016	Rotax Euro Challenge — Rotax Max Junior	KR Sport	3rd
2016	Rotax Max Challenge Grand Finals — Junior	KR Sport	8th

=== Complete Rotax Max Challenge Grand Finals results ===
Year	Team	Class	Quali Heats	Pre-Final	Main race
2016	(United Kingdom) KR Sport	125 Junior	5th	7th	8th

== Racing record ==
=== Racing career summary ===
Season	Series	Team	Races	Wins	Poles	F/Laps	Podiums	Points	Position
2016	Ginetta Junior Championship	JHR Developments	13	0	0	0	0	105	19th
2017	F4 British Championship	TRS Arden Junior Racing Team	17	0	0	0	0	39	14th
2017	Italian F4 Championship	Mücke Motorsport	15	0	0	0	0	15	11th
2017	ADAC Formula 4 Championship	ADAC Berlin-Brandenburg e.V.	6	0	0	0	0	0	NC†
2017–18	Formula 4 UAE Championship	Silberpfeil Energy Dubai	8	3	1	1	4	123	7th
2018	Italian F4 Championship	Prema Theodore Racing	21	4	4	2	11	262	**3rd**
2018	ADAC Formula 4 Championship	Prema Theodore Racing	21	1	0	0	4	125	7th
2018	Gulf 12 Hours - GT4	Bullitt Racing	2	2	0	1	2	—N/a	**1st**
2019	Formula Regional European Championship	Prema Powerteam	24	1	1	0	7	213	5th
2019	Macau Grand Prix	Trident	1	0	0	0	0	—N/a	DNF
2020	FIA Formula 3 Championship	Trident	18	0	0	0	0	18	16th
2020	Intercontinental GT Challenge	R-Motorsport	0	0	0	0	0	0	NC
2021	FIA Formula 3 Championship	Prema Racing	20	1	0	1	4	93	8th
2021	FIA World Endurance Championship - LMP2	ARC Bratislava	1	0	0	0	0	1	31st
2021	FIA Formula 2 Championship	Campos Racing	6	0	0	1	0	0	26th
2022	FIA Formula 2 Championship	Campos Racing	26	0	0	0	0	12	21st
2023	FIA World Endurance Championship - LMP2	Alpine Elf Team	7	0	0	0	0	23	18th
2023	24 Hours of Le Mans - LMP2	Alpine Elf Team	1	0	0	0	0	—N/a	9th
2023	European Le Mans Series - LMP2	Inter Europol Competition	6	0	0	0	1	33	7th
2024	European Le Mans Series - LMP2	Algarve Pro Racing	6	0	0	1	2	50	5th
2024	24 Hours of Le Mans - LMP2	Algarve Pro Racing	1	0	0	0	0	—N/a	8th
2024–25	Asian Le Mans Series - LMP2	Algarve Pro Racing	6	1	0	0	4	83	4th
2025	European Le Mans Series - LMP2 Pro-Am	Algarve Pro Racing	6	2	0	0	4	95	**2nd**
2026	24 Hours of Le Mans - LMP2 Pro-Am	Algarve Pro Racing	Reserve driver						

^{†} As Caldwell was a guest driver, he was ineligible to score points.

=== Complete Ginetta Junior Championship results ===
(key) (Races in bold indicate pole position) (Races in italics indicate fastest lap)

Year	Team	1	2	3	4	5	6	7	8	9	10	11	12	13	14	15	16	17	18	19	20	21	22	23	24	25	Pos	Points
2016	JHR Developments	BRI; 1	BRI; 2	DON; 1	DON; 2	DON; 3	THR; 1	THR; 2	OUL; 1	OUL; 2	CRO; 1; 5	CRO; 2; 16	CRO; 3; 13	SNE; 1; 13	SNE; 2 Ret	KNO; 1; 15	KNO; 2; 10	KNO; 3; 10	ROC; 1	ROC; 2	ROC; 3	SIL; 1; 14	SIL; 2; 12	SIL; 3; 13	BHGP; 1; 8	BHGP; 2; 11	19th	105

=== Complete F4 British Championship results ===
(key) (Races in bold indicate pole position) (Races in italics indicate fastest lap)

Year	Team	1	2	3	4	5	6	7	8	9	10	11	12	13	14	15	16	17	18	19	20	21	22	23	24	25	26	27	28	29	30	31	Pos	Points
2017	TRS Arden Junior Racing Team	BRI; 1	BRI; 2	BRI; 3	DON; 1	DON; 2	DON; 3	THR; 1	THR; 2	THR; 3	OUL; 1	OUL; 2	OUL; 3	CRO; 1 DNP	CRO; 2; 10	CRO; 3; 12	SNE; 1; 7	SNE; 2; 8	SNE; 3; 8	KNO; 1; 9	KNO; 2 C	KNO; 3; 13	KNO; 4; 9	ROC; 1; 12	ROC; 2; 7	ROC; 3 Ret	SIL; 1; 17	SIL; 2; 18	SIL; 3; 8	BHGP; 1; 9	BHGP; 2; 7	BHGP; 3; 9	14th	39

=== Complete Italian F4 Championship results ===
(key) (Races in bold indicate pole position) (Races in italics indicate fastest lap)

Year	Team	1	2	3	4	5	6	7	8	9	10	11	12	13	14	15	16	17	18	19	20	21	Pos	Points
2017	Mücke Motorsport	MIS; 1	MIS; 2	MIS; 3	ADR; 1	ADR; 2	ADR; 3	VLL; 1; 18	VLL; 2; 14	VLL; 3; 13	MUG1; 1; 11	MUG1; 2; 13	MUG1; 3; 11	IMO; 1 Ret	IMO; 2; 19	IMO; 3; 14	MUG2; 1; 21	MUG2; 2; 10	MUG2; 3; 10	MNZ; 1; 11	MNZ; 2; 15	MNZ; 3; 6	11th	15
2018	Prema Theodore Racing	ADR; 1; 7	ADR; 2; 4	ADR; 3; 8	LEC; 1; 1	**LEC**; **2**; 8	LEC; 3; 2	MNZ; 1; 2	MNZ; 2; 2	MNZ; 3; 3	MIS; 1; 6	MIS; 2; 10	MIS; 3; 9	IMO; 1; 9	IMO; 2; 2	IMO; 3; 9	**VLL**; **1**; 1	**VLL**; **2**; 1	**VLL**; **3**; 1	MUG; 1; 2	MUG; 2; 4	MUG; 3; 3	3rd	262

=== Complete ADAC Formula 4 Championship results ===
(key) (Races in bold indicate pole position) (Races in italics indicate fastest lap)

Year	Team	1	2	3	4	5	6	7	8	9	10	11	12	13	14	15	16	17	18	19	20	21	Pos	Points
2017	ADAC Berlin-Brandenburg e.V.	OSC1; 1	OSC1; 2	OSC1; 3	LAU; 1	LAU; 2	LAU; 3	RBR; 1	RBR; 2	RBR; 3	OSC2; 1; 23	OSC2; 2; 26	OSC2; 3; 22	NÜR; 1; 20	NÜR; 2; 21	NÜR; 3; 17	SAC; 1	SAC; 2	SAC; 3	HOC; 1	HOC; 2	HOC; 3	NC†	0
2018	Prema Theodore Racing	OSC; 1; 10	OSC; 2; 8	OSC; 3; 1	HOC1; 1; 3	HOC1; 2; 15	HOC1; 3; 10	LAU; 1 Ret	LAU; 2; 3	LAU; 3; 7	RBR; 1; 8	RBR; 2; 4	RBR; 3; 4	HOC2; 1 Ret	HOC2; 2; 2	NÜR; 1 Ret	NÜR; 2; 9	NÜR; 3; 7	HOC3; 1; 10	HOC3; 2; 12	HOC3; 3; 9		7th	125

^{†} As Caldwell was a guest driver, he was ineligible to score points.

=== Complete Formula 4 UAE Championship results ===
(key) (Races in bold indicate pole position) (Races in italics indicate fastest lap)

Year	Team	1	2	3	4	5	6	7	8	9	10	11	12	13	14	15	16	17	18	19	20	21	22	23	24	Pos	Points
2017-18	Silberpfeil Energy Dubai	YMC1; 1; 4	YMC1; 2; 2	YMC1; 3; 1	YMC1; 4; 8	YMC2; 1; 1	YMC2; 2; 1	**YMC2**; **3**; 8	YMC2; 4; 8	DUB1; 1	DUB1; 2	DUB1; 3	DUB1; 4	YMC3; 1	YMC3; 2	YMC3; 3	YMC3; 4	YMC4; 1	YMC4; 2	YMC4; 3	YMC4; 4	DUB2; 1	DUB2; 2	DUB2; 3	DUB2; 4	7th	123

=== Complete Gulf 12 Hours results ===
Year	Team	Class	Car	Qualifying	6 Hours	12 Hours
2018	(France) Bullitt Racing	GT4	Mercedes-AMG GT4	4th	**1st**	**1st**

=== Complete Formula Regional European Championship results ===
(key) (Races in bold indicate pole position; races in italics indicate fastest lap)

Year	Entrant	1	2	3	4	5	6	7	8	9	10	11	12	13	14	15	16	17	18	19	20	21	22	23	24	25	DC	Points
2019	Prema Powerteam	LEC; 1; 4	**LEC**; **2** DSQ	LEC; 3; 4	VLL; 1; 8	VLL; 2; 3	VLL; 3 C	HUN; 1; 3	HUN; 2; 3	HUN; 3; 2	RBR; 1; 7	RBR; 2 Ret	RBR; 3; 7	IMO; 1; 2	IMO; 2; 2	IMO; 3 Ret	IMO; 4; 1	CAT; 1; 7	CAT; 2; 6	CAT; 3; 4	MUG; 1; 9	MUG; 2; 11	MUG; 3; 10	MNZ; 1; 5	MNZ; 2; 8	MNZ; 3; 7	5th	213

=== Complete Macau Grand Prix results ===
Year	Team	Car	Qualifying	Quali Race	Main race
2019	(Italy) Trident	Dallara F3 2019	17th	23rd	DNF

=== Complete FIA Formula 3 Championship results ===
(key) (Races in bold indicate pole position; races in italics indicate points for the fastest lap of top ten finishers)

Year	Entrant	1	2	3	4	5	6	7	8	9	10	11	12	13	14	15	16	17	18	19	20	21	DC	Points
2020	Trident	RBR; FEA; 20	RBR; SPR; 19	RBR; FEA; 5‡	RBR; SPR; 6	HUN; FEA; 21	HUN; SPR; 18	SIL; FEA; Ret	SIL; SPR; 26	SIL; FEA; 21	SIL; SPR; 22	CAT; FEA; 20	CAT; SPR; Ret	SPA; FEA; 7	SPA; SPR; 11	MNZ; FEA; Ret	MNZ; SPR; 9	MUG; FEA; 17	MUG; SPR; 16				16th	18
2021	Prema Racing	CAT; 1; 6	CAT; 2; 1	CAT; 3; 4	LEC; 1; 10	LEC; 2; 4	LEC; 3 Ret	RBR; 1; 2	RBR; 2; 9	RBR; 3; 3	HUN; 1; 2	HUN; 2; 29	HUN; 3; 8	SPA; 1; 16	SPA; 2; 15	SPA; 3; 11	ZAN; 1; 10	ZAN; 2; 6	ZAN; 3; 14	SOC; 1; 17	SOC; 2 C	SOC; 3; 10	8th	93

^{‡} Half points awarded as less than 75% of race distance was completed.

=== Complete FIA Formula 2 Championship results ===
(key) (Races in bold indicate pole position) (Races in italics indicate points for the fastest lap of top ten finishers)

Year	Entrant	1	2	3	4	5	6	7	8	9	10	11	12	13	14	15	16	17	18	19	20	21	22	23	24	25	26	27	28	DC	Points
2021	Campos Racing	BHR; SP1	BHR; SP2	BHR; FEA	MCO; SP1	MCO; SP2	MCO; FEA	BAK; SP1	BAK; SP2	BAK; FEA	SIL; SP1	SIL; SP2	SIL; FEA	MNZ; SP1	MNZ; SP2	MNZ; FEA	SOC; SP1	SOC; SP2	SOC; FEA	JED; SP1; 18	JED; SP2; 12	JED; FEA; 16	YMC; SP1; 20	YMC; SP2; 15	YMC; FEA; 18					26th	0
2022	Campos Racing	BHR; SPR; 19†	BHR; FEA; 17	JED; SPR; 14	JED; FEA; 16	IMO; SPR; 17	IMO; FEA; 13	CAT; SPR; 13	CAT; FEA; 14	MCO; SPR; 16	MCO; FEA; 15	BAK; SPR; 19	BAK; FEA; Ret	SIL; SPR; 18	SIL; FEA; 17	RBR; SPR; 17	RBR; FEA; 6	LEC; SPR; 18	LEC; FEA; 13	HUN; SPR; 10	HUN; FEA; 20†	SPA; SPR; EX	SPA; FEA; EX	ZAN; SPR; Ret	ZAN; FEA; 8	MNZ; SPR; Ret	MNZ; FEA; Ret	YMC; SPR; 16	YMC; FEA; 20†	21st	12

^{†} Driver did not finish the race, but was classified as they completed more than 90% of the race distance.

=== Complete FIA World Endurance Championship results ===
(key) (Races in bold indicate pole position) (Races in italics indicate fastest lap)

Year	Entrant	Class	Chassis	Engine	1	2	3	4	5	6	7	Rank	Points
2021	ARC Bratislava	LMP2	Oreca 07	Gibson GK428 4.2 L V8	SPA	ALG	MNZ	LMS	BHR	BHR; 11		31st	1
2023	Alpine Elf Team	LMP2	Oreca 07	Gibson GK428 4.2 L V8	SEB; Ret	ALG; 10	SPA; 8	LMS; 7	MNZ; 8	FUJ; 11	BHR; 10	18th	23

=== Complete European Le Mans Series results ===
(key) (Races in bold indicate pole position; results in italics indicate fastest lap)

Year	Entrant	Class	Chassis	Engine	1	2	3	4	5	6	Rank	Points
2023	Inter Europol Competition	LMP2	Oreca 07	Gibson GK428 4.2 L V8	CAT; Ret	LEC; 3	ARA; Ret	SPA; Ret	POR; 6	ALG; 4	7th	33
2024	Algarve Pro Racing	LMP2	Oreca 07	Gibson GK428 4.2 L V8	CAT; 2	LEC; 7	IMO; 8	SPA; 14	MUG; 2	ALG; 8	5th	50
2025	Algarve Pro Racing	LMP2 Pro-Am	Oreca 07	Gibson GK428 4.2 L V8	CAT; 2	LEC; 6	IMO; 3	SPA; 1	SIL; 1	ALG; 8	2nd	95

=== 24 Hours of Le Mans results ===
Year	Team	Co-Drivers	Car	Class	Laps	Pos.	Class Pos.
2023	(France) Alpine Elf Team	(Brazil) André Negrão (Mexico) Memo Rojas	Oreca 07-Gibson	LMP2	323	19th	9th
2024	(Portugal) Algarve Pro Racing	(Canada) Roman De Angelis (Liechtenstein) Matthias Kaiser	Oreca 07-Gibson	LMP2	294	22nd	8th

=== Complete Asian Le Mans Series results ===
(key) (Races in bold indicate pole position) (Races in italics indicate fastest lap)

Year	Team	Class	Car	Engine	1	2	3	4	5	6	Pos.	Points
2024–25	Algarve Pro Racing	LMP2	Oreca 07	Gibson GK428 4.2 L V8	SEP; 1; 6	SEP; 2; 3	DUB; 1; 3	DUB; 2; 1	ABU; 1; 2	ABU; 2; 9	4th	83
