= 2022 Yas Island Formula 2 round =

Motor racing event

(United Arab Emirates) 2022 Yas Island Formula 2 round
Round details
- Round 14 of 14 in the 2022 FIA Formula 2 Championship.
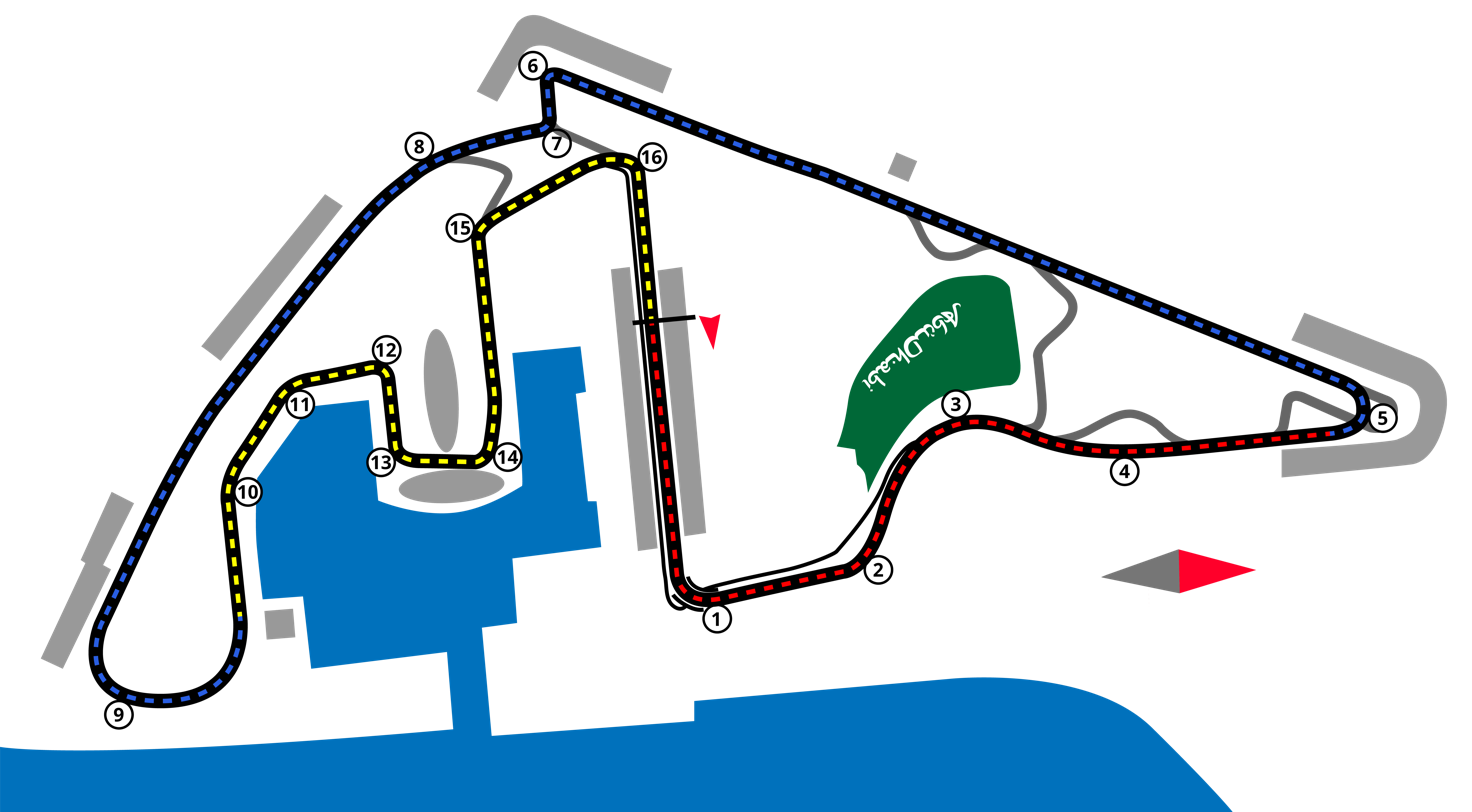
- Location: Yas Marina Circuit, Abu Dhabi, United Arab Emirates
- Course: Permanent Circuit; 5.281 km (3.281 mi)

Sprint race
- Date: 19 November 2022
- Laps: 23
Podium
First	(New Zealand) Liam Lawson	Carlin
Second	(Netherlands) Richard Verschoor	Trident
Third	(Brazil) Felipe Drugovich	MP Motorsport
Fastest lap
Driver	(New Zealand) Liam Lawson	Carlin
- Time: 1:39.292 (on lap 7)

Feature race
- Date: 20 November 2022
- Laps: 33
Pole position
Driver	(Japan) Ayumu Iwasa	DAMS
Time	1:36.290	
Podium
First	(Japan) Ayumu Iwasa	DAMS
Second	(Brazil) Felipe Drugovich	MP Motorsport
Third	(New Zealand) Liam Lawson	Carlin
Fastest lap
Driver	(France) Clément Novalak	MP Motorsport
- Time: 1:39.146 (on lap 24)

The 2022 Yas Island FIA Formula 2 round was a motor racing event held between 18 and 20 November 2022 at the Yas Marina Circuit, Abu Dhabi, United Arab Emirates. It was the final race of the 2022 Formula 2 Championship and was held in support of the 2022 Abu Dhabi Grand Prix.

After winning the Drivers' Championship with Felipe Drugovich, MP Motorsport also secured its first Teams' Championship in Formula 2 history after Drugovich finished runner-up in the Feature Race. Logan Sargeant ensured he had sufficient FIA Super License points to be promoted to a 2023 Formula One seat with Williams Racing by finishing fourth in the Drivers' Championship.

== Report ==
=== Championship standings before the round ===
==== Drivers' Championship ====
Brazilian racing driver Felipe Drugovich had already won the 2022 FIA Formula 2 Drivers' Championship in Monza, having extended an unassailable 77-point lead over his closest rival, Théo Pourchaire.

During the weekend of the 2022 United States Grand Prix, former Williams Racing Team Principal and CEO Jost Capito announced that Logan Sargeant would be promoted from the Williams Driver Academy to a Formula One race seat in 2023 if he finished high enough in the standings to qualify for an FIA Super Licence. Having already accumulated 29 Super Licence points, Sargeant would need to finish at least fifth in the Drivers' Championship (or sixth, without receiving any penalty points); Sargeant was in third place ahead of the Yas Island Formula 2 round.

==== Teams' Championship ====
MP Motorsport, ART Grand Prix, and Carlin were in contention for the 2022 FIA Formula 2 Teams' Championship. Both MP Motorsport and ART Grand Prix were level on points; however, MP Motorsport was ahead on countback due to having won more races. Carlin were third in the standings, twenty-three points behind the two other title contenders.

=== Driver changes ===
Trident driver Calan Williams parted ways with his team before the Yas Marina season finale. He was replaced by 2022 FIA Formula 3 vice champion Zane Maloney, who made his FIA Formula 2 Championship debut.

Van Amersfoort Racing driver David Beckmann was replaced by Juan Manuel Correa, who returned to Formula 2 for the first time since his accident in 2019.

=== Qualifying ===
Qualifying was red-flagged twice. The first red flag was deployed seven minutes into the session, after Virtuosi driver Marino Sato spun out at Turn 14. Sato was unable to set a qualifying time within the 107% rule, but was granted permission by the stewards to start the race after setting acceptable times in practice. The session was green-flagged after a five-minute delay.

Despite having an earlier lap time deleted for track limits, Ayumu Iwasa qualified on pole with a lap time of 1:36.290. His teammate, Roy Nissany, locked out the front row for DAMS with a time which was 0.036 seconds slower. Carlin finished qualifying as the only other team with two drivers inside the top ten. Shortly after Iwasa's pole position lap, a second, session-ending red flag was deployed following Zane Maloney's spin at Turn 9.

=== Sprint race ===
Richard Verschoor started the sprint race from pole, but was overtaken by eventual sprint race winner Liam Lawson on Lap 10. Felipe Drugovich made up four places from seventh place on the grid to finish in third. Dennis Hauger finished in fourth, while Amaury Cordeel secured his best Formula 2 finish in fifth place. Logan Sargeant held on to his starting position of sixth, despite dropping down to ninth on the opening lap; a red flag, deployed after Enzo Fittipaldi and Jehan Daruvala collided at Turn 3, enabled Sargeant to return to his original starting position for the rolling restart. Jack Doohan finished in seventh, unable to overtake Sargeant despite the American driver having a flat-spotted left front tyre. Roy Nissany was the final points finisher in eighth place.

=== Feature race ===
Ayumu Iwasa won the feature race from pole position after battling Felipe Drugovich, whose second-place finish secured the 2022 Teams' Championship title for MP Motorsport. Liam Lawson finished in third, leapfrogging Carlin ahead of ART Grand Prix to finish second in the teams' standings. A virtual safety car was deployed on the opening lap after Ralph Boschung made contact with Juan Manuel Correa before spin out at Turn 9. Boschung retired from the race, having been unable to recover his car. Théo Pourchaire made the first overtake after racing resumed on Lap 3, demoting Dennis Hauger down to third. Drugovich followed soon after with a move on Roy Nissany to take second.

A marginally quicker pit stop allowed Lawson to overtake Hauger in the pit lane on Lap 8, allowing the Carlin driver to assume a net position of third, behind Iwasa and Drugovich. Jack Doohan pit on Lap 26, having been one of the few drivers starting on medium compound tyres; however, his front left tyre detached following his pit stop, forcing him to retire from the race and triggering another virtual safety car. Théo Pourchaire suffered a terminal mechanical issue after hitting a bird with four laps to go, causing him to retire from the race. Hauger and Logan Sargeant finished fourth and fifth respectively, with Amaury Cordeel, Richard Verschoor, Jüri Vips, Marcus Armstrong and Nissany the rest of the points finishers. Nissany received a five-second time penalty for track limits, dropping him down from his on-track finishing position of seventh.

== Classification ==
=== Qualifying ===
Pos.	No.	Driver	Entrant	Time	Grid SR	Grid FR
1	17	(Japan) Ayumu Iwasa	DAMS	1:36.290	10	1
2	16	(Israel) Roy Nissany	DAMS	+0.036	9	2
3	10	(France) Théo Pourchaire	ART Grand Prix	+0.082	8	3
4	11	(Brazil) Felipe Drugovich	MP Motorsport	+0.192	7	4
5	3	(Australia) Jack Doohan	Virtuosi Racing	+0.220	6	5
6	6	(United States) Logan Sargeant	Carlin	+0.224	5	6
7	1	(Norway) Dennis Hauger	Prema Racing	+0.260	4	7
8	25	(Belgium) Amaury Cordeel	Van Amersfoort Racing	+0.288	3	8
9	5	(New Zealand) Liam Lawson	Carlin	+0.298	2	9
10	20	(Netherlands) Richard Verschoor	Trident	+0.298	1	10
11	7	(New Zealand) Marcus Armstrong	Hitech Grand Prix	+0.329	11	11
12	2	(India) Jehan Daruvala	Prema Racing	+0.340	12	12
13	22	(Brazil) Enzo Fittipaldi	Charouz Racing System	+0.390	13	13
14	15	(Switzerland) Ralph Boschung	Campos Racing	+0.395	17^{1}	14
15	8	(Estonia) Jüri Vips	Hitech Grand Prix	+0.504	14	15
16	9	(Denmark) Frederik Vesti	ART Grand Prix	+0.733	15	16
17	12	(France) Clément Novalak	MP Motorsport	+0.755	16	17
18	24	(United States) Juan Manuel Correa	Van Amersfoort Racing	+0.794	18	18
19	21	(Barbados) Zane Maloney	Trident	+0.810	19	19
20	14	(United Kingdom) Olli Caldwell	Campos Racing	+0.918	20	20
21	23	(Colombia) Tatiana Calderón	Charouz Racing System	+1.538	21	21
107% time: 1:43.030 (+6.740)
—	4	(Japan) Marino Sato	Virtuosi Racing	+23.455	22	22

Notes

- ^1 – Ralph Boschung originally qualified fourteenth, but received a three-place grid drop for the next race he participates in (Sprint Race) for both rejoining the track in an unsafe manner and causing a collision with Théo Pourchaire at the previous round in Monza.

=== Sprint race ===
Pos.	No.	Driver	Entrant	Laps	Time/Retired	Grid	Points
1	5	(New Zealand) Liam Lawson	Carlin	23	1:11:53.868	2	10 (1)
2	20	(Netherlands) Richard Verschoor	Trident	23	+7.943	1	8
3	11	(Brazil) Felipe Drugovich	MP Motorsport	23	+8.803	7	6
4	1	(Norway) Dennis Hauger	Prema Racing	23	+14.937	4	5
5	25	(Belgium) Amaury Cordeel	Van Amersfoort Racing	23	+15.449	3	4
6	6	(United States) Logan Sargeant	Carlin	23	+15.938	5	3
7	3	(Australia) Jack Doohan	Virtuosi Racing	23	+16.501	6	2
8	16	(Israel) Roy Nissany	DAMS	23	+17.313	9	1
9	10	(France) Théo Pourchaire	ART Grand Prix	23	+17.579	8	
10	7	(New Zealand) Marcus Armstrong	Hitech Grand Prix	23	+17.968	11	
11	9	(Denmark) Frederik Vesti	ART Grand Prix	23	+19.213	15	
12	8	(Estonia) Jüri Vips	Hitech Grand Prix	23	+22.031	14	
13	17	(Japan) Ayumu Iwasa	DAMS	23	+24.162	10	
14	12	(France) Clément Novalak	MP Motorsport	23	+27.095	16	
15	21	(Barbados) Zane Maloney	Trident	23	+33.860	19	
16	14	(United Kingdom) Olli Caldwell	Campos Racing	23	+34.034	20	
17	15	(Switzerland) Ralph Boschung	Campos Racing	23	+36.430	17	
18	24	(United States) Juan Manuel Correa	Van Amersfoort Racing	23	+38.164^{1}	18	
19	4	(Japan) Marino Sato	Virtuosi Racing	23	+58.710	22	
20	23	(Colombia) Tatiana Calderón	Charouz Racing System	23	+1:14.890	21	
DNF	2	(India) Jehan Daruvala	Prema Racing	0	Collision	12	
DNF	22	(Brazil) Enzo Fittipaldi	Charouz Racing System	0	Collision	13	
Fastest lap set by (New Zealand) Liam Lawson: 1:39.292 (lap 7)

Notes:

- ^1 – Juan Manuel Correa originally finished fifteenth, but later received a five-second time penalty for causing a collision with Marino Sato, dropping him down to eighteenth place.

=== Feature race ===
Pos.	No.	Driver	Entrant	Laps	Time/Retired	Grid	Points
1	17	(Japan) Ayumu Iwasa	DAMS	33	57:02.908	1	25 (2)
2	11	(Brazil) Felipe Drugovich	MP Motorsport	33	+0.830	4	18
3	5	(New Zealand) Liam Lawson	Carlin	33	+1.348	9	15
4	1	(Norway) Dennis Hauger	Prema Racing	33	+13.440	7	12
5	6	(United States) Logan Sargeant	Carlin	33	+14.064	6	10
6	25	(Belgium) Amaury Cordeel	Van Amersfoort Racing	33	+15.719	8	8
7	20	(Netherlands) Richard Verschoor	Trident	33	+18.162	10	6
8	8	(Estonia) Jüri Vips	Hitech Grand Prix	33	+20.279	15	4
9	7	(New Zealand) Marcus Armstrong	Hitech Grand Prix	33	+20.684	11	2
10	16	(Israel) Roy Nissany	DAMS	33	+22.181	2	1
11	9	(Denmark) Frederik Vesti	ART Grand Prix	33	+22.732	16	
12	12	(France) Clément Novalak	MP Motorsport	33	+23.489	20	
13	2	(India) Jehan Daruvala	Prema Racing	33	+24.298	12	
14	22	(Brazil) Enzo Fittipaldi	Charouz Racing System	33	+27.616	13	
15	4	(Japan) Marino Sato	Virtuosi Racing	33	+28.246	22	
16	21	(Barbados) Zane Maloney	Trident	33	+31.754	18	
17	24	(United States) Juan Manuel Correa	Van Amersfoort Racing	33	+32.446	17	
18	23	(Colombia) Tatiana Calderón	Charouz Racing System	33	+45.116	21	
19	10	(France) Théo Pourchaire	ART Grand Prix	31	Gearbox	3	
20	14	(United Kingdom) Olli Caldwell	Campos Racing	29	Driveshaft	19	
DNF	3	(Australia) Jack Doohan	Virtuosi Racing	25	Wheel nut	5	
DNF	15	(Switzerland) Ralph Boschung	Campos Racing	0	Spun off	14	
Fastest lap set by (France) Clément Novalak: 1:39.146 (lap 24)

== Final championship standings ==
Drivers' Championship standings

	Pos.	Driver	Points
	1	(Brazil) Felipe Drugovich	265
	2	(France) Théo Pourchaire	164
4	3	(New Zealand) Liam Lawson	149
1	4	(United States) Logan Sargeant	148
4	5	(Japan) Ayumu Iwasa	141

Teams' Championship standings

	Pos.	Team	Points
	1	(Netherlands) MP Motorsport	305
1	2	(United Kingdom) Carlin	297
1	3	(France) ART Grand Prix	281
	4	(Italy) Prema Racing	241
	5	(United Kingdom) Hitech Grand Prix	207

- Note: Only the top five positions are included for both sets of standings.
- Note: Bold names include the Drivers' and Teams' Champion respectively.

== See also ==
- 2022 Abu Dhabi Grand Prix

Previous round: 2022 Monza Formula 2 round	FIA Formula 2 Championship; 2022 season	Next round: 2023 Sakhir Formula 2 round
Previous round: 2021 Yas Island Formula 2 round	Yas Island Formula 2 round	Next round: 2023 Yas Island Formula 2 round
