= 2021 Yas Island Formula 2 round =

Car racing competition

(United Arab Emirates) 2021 Yas Island Formula 2 round
Round details
- Round 8 of 8 in the 2021 FIA Formula 2 Championship.
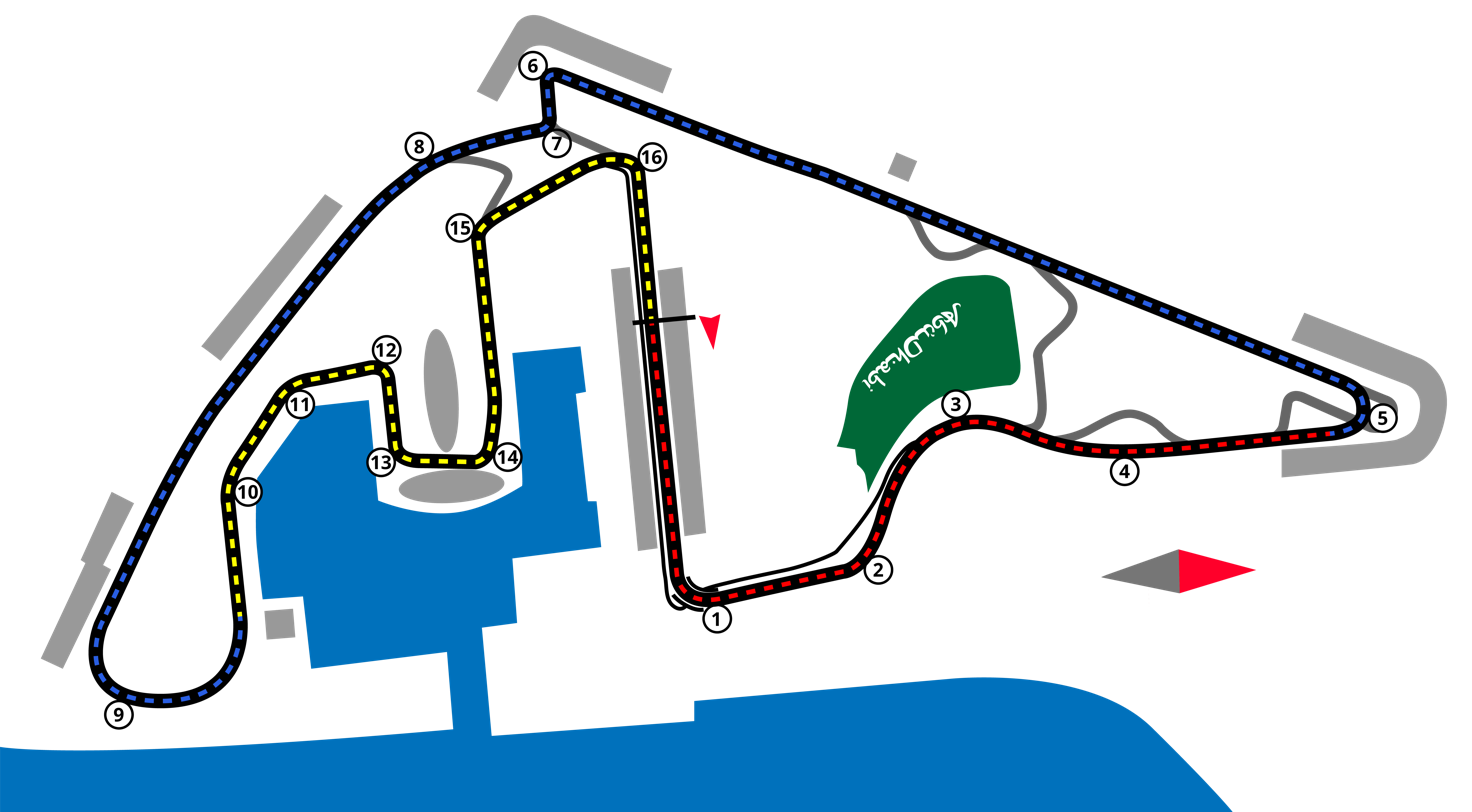
- Location: Yas Marina Circuit, Abu Dhabi, United Arab Emirates
- Course: Permanent Circuit; 5.281 km (3.281 mi)

Sprint race 1
- Date: 11 December 2021
- Laps: 23
Podium
First	(India) Jehan Daruvala	Carlin
Second	(Brazil) Felipe Drugovich	UNI-Virtuosi
Third	(Australia) Oscar Piastri	Prema Racing
Fastest lap
Driver	(United Kingdom) Olli Caldwell	Campos Racing
- Time: 1:39.070 (on 22)

Sprint race 2
- Date: 11 December 2021
- Laps: 23
Podium
First	(China) Guanyu Zhou	UNI-Virtuosi
Second	(Russia) Robert Shwartzman	Prema Racing
Third	(Switzerland) Ralph Boschung	Campos Racing
Fastest lap
Driver	(Israel) Roy Nissany	
- Time: 1:37.445 (on 23)

Feature race
- Date: 12 December 2021
- Laps: 33
Pole position
Driver	(Australia) Oscar Piastri	Prema Racing
Time	1:35.077	
Podium
First	(Australia) Oscar Piastri	Prema Racing
Second	(China) Guanyu Zhou	UNI-Virtuosi
Third	(Brazil) Felipe Drugovich	UNI-Virtuosi
Fastest lap
Driver	(France) Théo Pourchaire	ART Grand Prix
- Time: 1:37.789 (on 29)

The 2021 Yas Island Formula 2 round was the eighth and final race of the 2021 FIA Formula 2 Championship. It took place at the Yas Marina Circuit from 10 to 12 December in support of the 2021 Abu Dhabi Grand Prix and featured three races.

Oscar Piastri clinched the driver's title after finishing third in Sprint Race 1; in doing so, the Australian driver is the third rookie after Charles Leclerc and George Russell to win the championship in the modern Formula 2 era.

== Classification ==
=== Qualifying ===
Pos.	No.	Driver	Entrant	Time	Gap	Grid
1	2	(Australia) Oscar Piastri	Prema Racing	1:35.077	–	1
2	11	(Australia) Jack Doohan	MP Motorsport	1:35.290	+0.213	2
3	3	(China) Guanyu Zhou	UNI-Virtuosi	1:35.348	+0.271	3
4	1	(Russia) Robert Shwartzman	Prema Racing	1:35.360	+0.283	4
5	21	(Switzerland) Ralph Boschung	Campos Racing	1:35.496	+0.419	5
6	10	(France) Théo Pourchaire	ART Grand Prix	1:35.504	+0.427	6
7	7	(New Zealand) Liam Lawson	Hitech Grand Prix	1:35.511	+0.434	7
8	4	(Brazil) Felipe Drugovich	UNI-Virtuosi	1:35.612	+0.535	8
9	5	(United Kingdom) Dan Ticktum	Carlin	1:35.618	+0.541	9
10	6	(India) Jehan Daruvala	Carlin	1:35.821	+0.744	10
11	17	(New Zealand) Marcus Armstrong	DAMS	1:35.855	+0.778	11
12	9	(Denmark) Christian Lundgaard	ART Grand Prix	1:36.016	+0.939	12
13	16	(Israel) Roy Nissany	DAMS	1:36.080	+1.003	13
14	25	(Japan) Marino Sato	Trident	1:36.241	+1.164	14
15	8	(Estonia) Jüri Vips	Hitech Grand Prix	1:36.282	+1.205	15
16	14	(Netherlands) Richard Verschoor	Charouz Racing System	1:36.293	+1.216	16
17	24	(Netherlands) Bent Viscaal	Trident	1:36.312	+1.235	17
18	22	(United Kingdom) Jake Hughes	HWA Racelab	1:36.462	+1.385	18
19	20	(United Kingdom) Olli Caldwell	Campos Racing	1:36.570	+1.493	19
20	12	(France) Clément Novalak	MP Motorsport	1:36.722	+1.645	20
21	15	(Brazil) Guilherme Samaia	Charouz Racing System	1:36.741	+1.664	21
22	23	(Italy) Alessio Deledda	HWA Racelab	1:38.657	+3.580	22

=== Sprint race 1 ===
Pos.	No.	Driver	Entrant	Laps	Time/Retired	Grid	Points
1	6	(India) Jehan Daruvala	Carlin	23	38:33.605	1	15
2	4	(Brazil) Felipe Drugovich	UNI-Virtuosi	23	+2.079	3	12
3	2	(Australia) Oscar Piastri	Prema Racing	23	+2.915	10	10
4	1	(Russia) Robert Shwartzman	Prema Racing	23	+3.581	7	8
5	7	(New Zealand) Liam Lawson	Hitech Grand Prix	23	+11.243	4	6
6	5	(United Kingdom) Dan Ticktum	Carlin	23	+12.978	2	4
7	10	(France) Théo Pourchaire	ART Grand Prix	23	+14.120	5	2
8	3	(China) Guanyu Zhou	UNI-Virtuosi	23	+15.595	8	1
9	21	(Switzerland) Ralph Boschung	Campos Racing	23	+17.081	6	
10	17	(New Zealand) Marcus Armstrong	DAMS	23	+17.539	11	
11	11	(Australia) Jack Doohan	MP Motorsport	23	+18.530	9	
12	8	(Estonia) Jüri Vips	Hitech Grand Prix	23	+19.270	15	
13	24	(Netherlands) Bent Viscaal	Trident	23	+22.226	17	
14	16	(Israel) Roy Nissany	DAMS	23	+29.927	13	
15	9	(Denmark) Christian Lundgaard	ART Grand Prix	23	+32.099	12	
16	15	(Brazil) Guilherme Samaia	Charouz Racing System	23	+32.636	21	
17	12	(France) Clément Novalak	MP Motorsport	23	+37.036	20	
18	23	(Italy) Alessio Deledda	HWA Racelab	23	+48.948	22	
19	25	(Japan) Marino Sato	Trident	23	+54.333	14	
20	20	(United Kingdom) Olli Caldwell	Campos Racing	23	+1:43.561	19	
DNF	22	(United Kingdom) Jake Hughes	HWA Racelab	19	Collision damage	18	
DNF	14	(Netherlands) Richard Verschoor	Charouz Racing System	11	Mechanical	16	
Fastest lap： (United Kingdom) Olli Caldwell − Campos Racing − 1:39.070 (lap 22)

=== Sprint Race 2 ===
Pos.	No.	Driver	Entrant	Laps	Time/Retired	Grid	Points
1	3	(China) Guanyu Zhou	UNI-Virtuosi	23	43:27.096	3	15
2	1	(Russia) Robert Shwartzman	Prema Racing	23	+3.413	7	12
3	21	(Switzerland) Ralph Boschung	Campos Racing	23	+9.772	2	10
4	5	(United Kingdom) Dan Ticktum	Carlin	23	+14.296	5	8
5	4	(Brazil) Felipe Drugovich	UNI-Virtuosi	23	+14.501	9	6
6	7	(New Zealand) Liam Lawson	Hitech Grand Prix	23	+17.088	6	4
7	6	(India) Jehan Daruvala	Carlin	23	+19.839	10	2
8	11	(Australia) Jack Doohan	MP Motorsport	23	+21.086	11	1
9	10	(France) Théo Pourchaire	ART Grand Prix	23	+21.942	4	
10	24	(Netherlands) Bent Viscaal	Trident	23	+22.722	13	
11	14	(Netherlands) Richard Verschoor	Charouz Racing System	23	+25.881	22	
12	15	(Brazil) Guilherme Samaia	Charouz Racing System	23	+30.899	16	
13	22	(United Kingdom) Jake Hughes	HWA Racelab	23	+31.463	21	
14	12	(France) Clément Novalak	MP Motorsport	23	+31.867	17	
15	20	(United Kingdom) Olli Caldwell	Campos Racing	23	+32.236	20	
16	25	(Japan) Marino Sato	Trident	23	+37.022	19	
17	16	(Israel) Roy Nissany	DAMS	23	+1:06.754	14	
18	9	(Denmark) Christian Lundgaard	ART Grand Prix	22	+1 lap	15	
DNF	17	(New Zealand) Marcus Armstrong	DAMS	10	Engine	1	
DNF	8	(Estonia) Jüri Vips	Hitech Grand Prix	6	Collision	12	
DNF	2	(Australia) Oscar Piastri	Prema Racing	6	Collision	8	
DNF	23	(Italy) Alessio Deledda	HWA Racelab	2	Collision	18	
Fastest lap： (Israel) Roy Nissany − DAMS − 1:37.445 − (lap 23)

=== Feature race ===
Pos.	No.	Driver	Entrant	Laps	Time/Retired	Grid	Points
1	2	(Australia) Oscar Piastri	Prema Racing	33	58:14.400	1	25 (4)
2	3	(China) Guanyu Zhou	UNI-Virtuosi	33	+3.288	3	18
3	4	(Brazil) Felipe Drugovich	UNI-Virtuosi	33	+8.242	8	15
4	10	(France) Théo Pourchaire	ART Grand Prix	33	+9.977	6	12 (2)
5	1	(Russia) Robert Shwartzman	Prema Racing	33	+13.333	4	10
6	5	(United Kingdom) Dan Ticktum	Carlin	33	+19.166	9	8
7	17	(New Zealand) Marcus Armstrong	DAMS	33	+19.775	11	6
8	8	(Estonia) Jüri Vips	Hitech Grand Prix	33	+22.555	15	4
9	21	(Switzerland) Ralph Boschung	Campos Racing	33	+26.415	5	2
10	14	(Netherlands) Richard Verschoor	Charouz Racing System	33	+27.242	16	1
11	6	(India) Jehan Daruvala	Carlin	33	+30.007	10	
12	24	(Netherlands) Bent Viscaal	Trident	33	+32.619	17	
13	16	(Israel) Roy Nissany	DAMS	33	+37.305	13	
14	12	(France) Clément Novalak	MP Motorsport	33	+37.836	20	
15	9	(Denmark) Christian Lundgaard	ART Grand Prix	33	+40.446	12	
16	15	(Brazil) Guilherme Samaia	Charouz Racing System	33	+41.040	21	
17	25	(Japan) Marino Sato	Trident	33	+42.341	14	
18	20	(United Kingdom) Olli Caldwell	Campos Racing	33	+43.846	19	
19	23	(Italy) Alessio Deledda	HWA Racelab	33	+1:20.339	22	
DNF	7	(New Zealand) Liam Lawson	Hitech Grand Prix	29	Gearbox	7	
DNF	22	(United Kingdom) Jake Hughes	HWA Racelab	21	Mechanical	18	
DNF	11	(Australia) Jack Doohan	MP Motorsport	0	Collision	2	
Fastest lap： (France) Théo Pourchaire − ART Grand Prix − 1:37.789 − (lap 29)

== Final championship standings ==
Drivers' Championship standings

Pos.	Driver	Points
1	(Australia) Oscar Piastri	252.5
2	(Russia) Robert Shwartzman	192
3	(China) Guanyu Zhou	183
4	(United Kingdom) Dan Ticktum	159.5
5	(France) Théo Pourchaire	140

Teams' Championship standings

	Pos.	Team	Points
	1	(Italy) Prema Racing	444.5
1	2	(United Kingdom) UNI-Virtuosi Racing	288
1	3	(United Kingdom) Carlin	272.5
	4	(United Kingdom) Hitech Grand Prix	223
	5	(France) ART Grand Prix	190

- Note: Only the top five positions are included for both sets of standings.
- Note: Bold names include the Drivers' and Teams' Champion respectively.

== See also ==
- 2021 Abu Dhabi Grand Prix

Previous round: 2021 Jeddah Formula 2 round	FIA Formula 2 Championship; 2021 season	Next round: 2022 Sakhir Formula 2 round
Previous round: 2019 Yas Island Formula 2 round	Yas Island Formula 2 round	Next round: 2022 Yas Island Formula 2 round
