= 2021 Formula 2 Championship =

Motor racing championship held in 2021

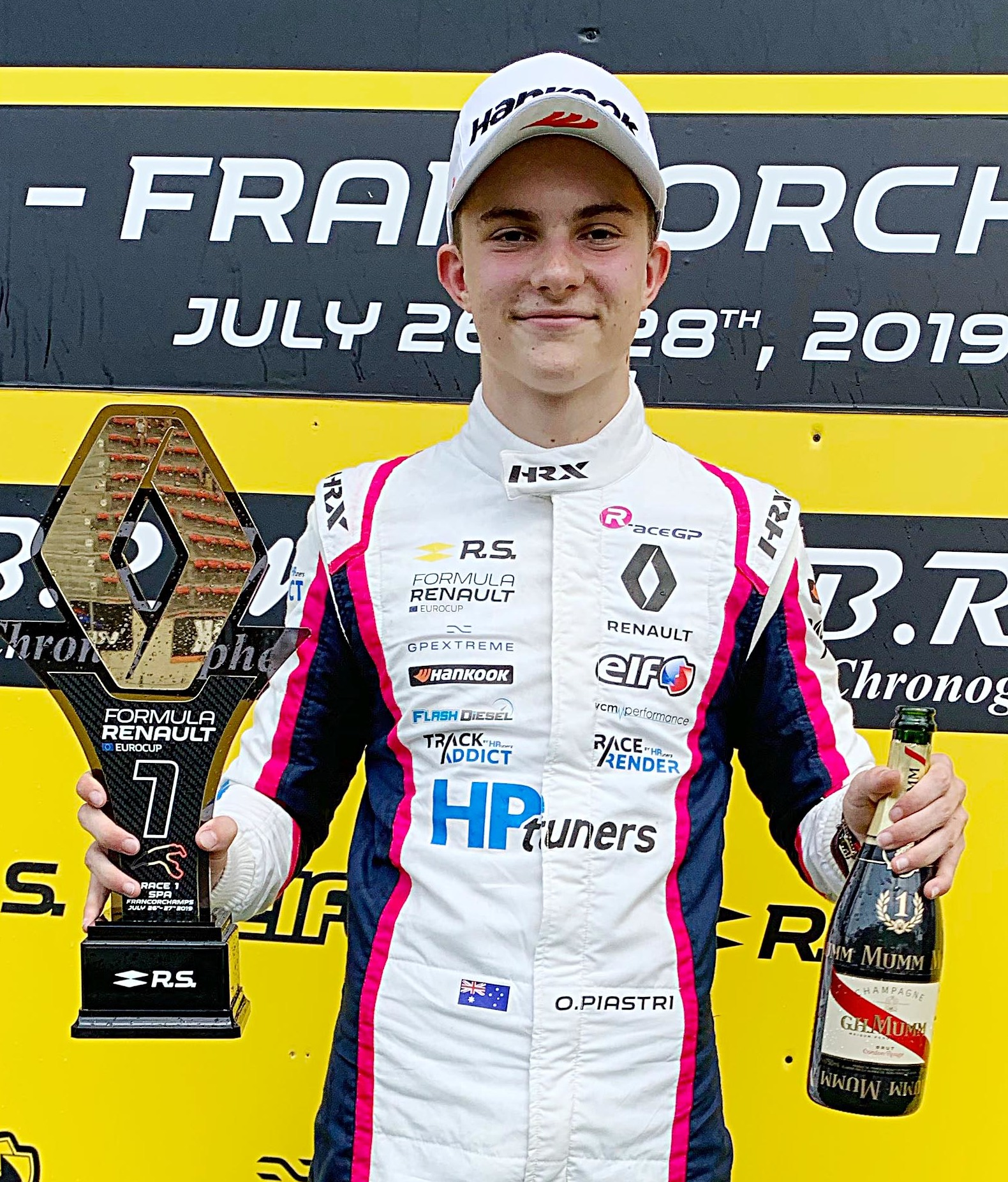
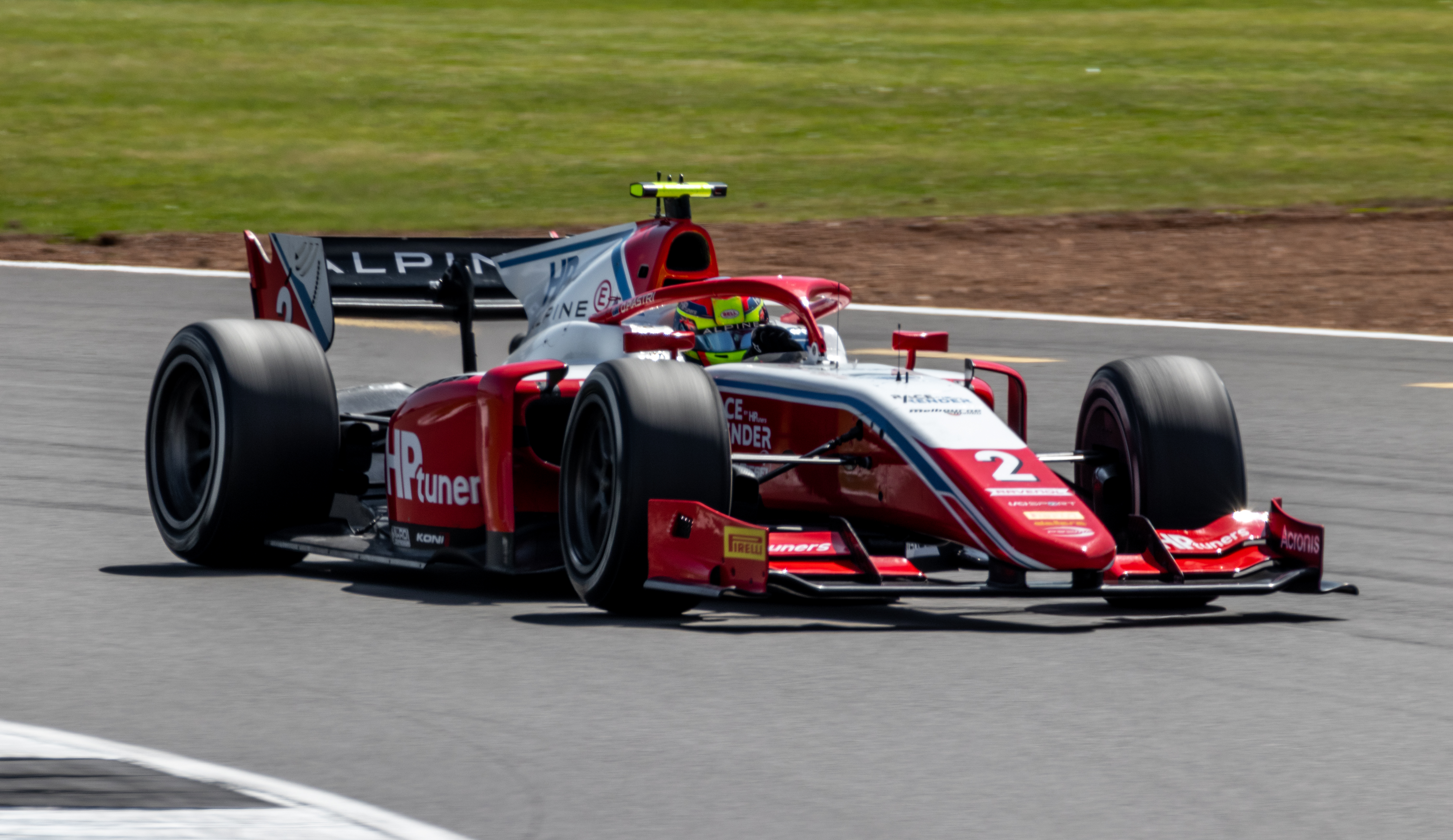
Oscar Piastri (left) and his team, Prema Racing (right), won the Drivers' and Teams' Championships, respectively.

The 2021 FIA Formula 2 Championship was a motor racing championship for Formula 2 cars that was sanctioned by the Fédération Internationale de l'Automobile (FIA). The championship was the fifty-fifth season of Formula 2 racing and the fifth season run under the FIA Formula 2 Championship moniker. It was an open-wheel racing category that served as the second tier of formula racing in the FIA Global Pathway. The category was run in support of selected rounds of the 2021 FIA Formula One World Championship. As the championship was a spec series, all teams and drivers competing in the championship ran the same car, the Dallara F2 2018. The championship was contested over twenty-four races at eight circuits. It began in March 2021 with a round in support of the Bahrain Grand Prix, and ended in December where it supported the Abu Dhabi Grand Prix.

Mick Schumacher was the defending drivers champion having secured the title at the final race of the 2020 season at the Bahrain International Circuit. Schumacher was promoted to Formula One with Haas for the 2021 F1 season. Schumacher's team Prema Racing entered the season as the defending teams champions having also secured their title at the final race of the 2020 season at Bahrain.

A new chassis package was due to be introduced for the 2021 season, but in a bid to cut costs in light of the COVID-19 pandemic, the lifespan of the Dallara F2 2018 chassis package was extended until 2023.

Oscar Piastri secured the Drivers' Championship in Race 1 at Yas Marina, the season finale. Piastri became F2's first rookie champion since George Russell in 2018. He took five consecutive pole positions, from Silverstone to Yas Marina, and won all four feature races in the second half of the season in addition to sprint race victories in Bahrain and Jeddah. The strong results of Piastri and team-mate Robert Shwartzman, the championship runner-up, allowed Prema Racing to secure the Teams' Championship with a round to spare.

Piastri's dominance after the summer break quickly dented the title hopes of early title favourites like Shwartzman and Guanyu Zhou. Shwartzman faced trouble in the early rounds, suffering collisions at both Bahrain and Monaco, but he finished in the top six in all but one race from Baku until the end of the season. Zhou took four wins, including the feature races at Bahrain and Silverstone, but his campaign fizzled out after difficult weekends at Sochi and Jeddah. Dan Ticktum, Théo Pourchaire, Jüri Vips, and Jehan Daruvala took two wins each, but none of them were able to sustain a season-long championship challenge. Other race winners were rookie Richard Verschoor – who had his maiden F2 victory in the second sprint race at Great Britain – and two drivers from New Zealand: Liam Lawson – who crossed the finish line first on his debut race – and Marcus Armstrong – who won the first sprint race in Saudi Arabia.

In an effort to cut costs during the COVID-19 pandemic, series organizers adopted a new format for both F2 and FIA Formula 3 for the 2021 season. Notably, each weekend comprised three races rather than two. The traditional feature race with the mandatory pit-stop was moved to Sunday morning, while on Saturday, there were two sprint races with reverse-grid formats based on the results of qualifying and Race 1 respectively. The extra race was made possible because F3 races were run on different weekends to F2, with the exception of the Sochi round, leaving more space in the timetable of each race weekend. However, the large gaps between rounds – eight weeks between the first two rounds and between Rounds 4 and 5, and ten weeks between Rounds 6 and 7 — made the format widely unpopular, and it was reverted to the previous format ahead of the 2022 season.

== Entries ==
The following teams and drivers competed in the 2021 championship. As the championship was a spec series, all competitors raced with an identical Dallara F2 2018 chassis with a V6 turbo engine developed by Mecachrome. Teams competed with tyres supplied by Pirelli. The same eleven teams who competed during the 2020 season were retained for the next three-year cycle.

Entrant	No.	Driver name	Rounds
(Italy) Prema Racing	1	(Russia) Robert Shwartzman	All
(Italy) Prema Racing	2	(Australia) Oscar Piastri	All
(United Kingdom) UNI-Virtuosi Racing	3	(China) Guanyu Zhou	All
(United Kingdom) UNI-Virtuosi Racing	4	(Brazil) Felipe Drugovich	All
(United Kingdom) Carlin	5	(United Kingdom) Dan Ticktum	All
(United Kingdom) Carlin	6	(India) Jehan Daruvala	All
(United Kingdom) Hitech Grand Prix	7	(New Zealand) Liam Lawson	All
(United Kingdom) Hitech Grand Prix	8	(Estonia) Jüri Vips	All
(France) ART Grand Prix	9	(Denmark) Christian Lundgaard	All
(France) ART Grand Prix	10	(France) Théo Pourchaire	All
(Netherlands) MP Motorsport	11	(Netherlands) Richard Verschoor	1–6
(Netherlands) MP Motorsport	11	(Australia) Jack Doohan	7–8
(Netherlands) MP Motorsport	12	(Germany) Lirim Zendeli	1–6
(Netherlands) MP Motorsport	12	(France) Clément Novalak	7–8
(Czech Republic) Charouz Racing System	14	(Germany) David Beckmann	1–4
(Czech Republic) Charouz Racing System	14	(Brazil) Enzo Fittipaldi	5–7
(Czech Republic) Charouz Racing System	14	(Netherlands) Richard Verschoor	8
(Czech Republic) Charouz Racing System	15	(Brazil) Guilherme Samaia	All
(France) DAMS	16	(Israel) Roy Nissany	All
(France) DAMS	17	(New Zealand) Marcus Armstrong	All
(Spain) Campos Racing	20	(Brazil) Gianluca Petecof	1–2
(Spain) Campos Racing	20	(Italy) Matteo Nannini	3–4
(Spain) Campos Racing	20	(Germany) David Beckmann	5–6
(Spain) Campos Racing	20	(United Kingdom) Olli Caldwell	7–8
(Spain) Campos Racing	21	(Switzerland) Ralph Boschung	All
(Germany) HWA Racelab	22	(Italy) Matteo Nannini	1
(Germany) HWA Racelab	22	(United Kingdom) Jack Aitken	2–4
(Germany) HWA Racelab	22	(United Kingdom) Jake Hughes	5–6, 8
(Germany) HWA Racelab	22	(United States) Logan Sargeant	7
(Germany) HWA Racelab	23	(Italy) Alessio Deledda	All
(Italy) Trident	24	(Netherlands) Bent Viscaal	All
(Italy) Trident	25	(Japan) Marino Sato	All

=== Driver changes ===
Prema Racing hired reigning FIA Formula 3 champion Oscar Piastri to replace Mick Schumacher, who graduated to Formula One with Haas F1 Team.

UNI-Virtuosi Racing signed former MP Motorsport driver Felipe Drugovich to replace Callum Ilott, who left the championship to become a test driver for Formula One team Scuderia Ferrari.

Carlin hired former DAMS driver Dan Ticktum to replace Yuki Tsunoda, who graduated to Formula One with Scuderia AlphaTauri.

Hitech Grand Prix fielded a new driver line-up. Nikita Mazepin graduated to Formula One with Haas F1 Team and Luca Ghiotto joined Deutsche Tourenwagen Masters. They were replaced with Red Bull juniors Liam Lawson, who graduated from Hitech's FIA Formula 3 outfit, and Jüri Vips, who temporarily raced for DAMS in 2020 as a replacement driver.

ART Grand Prix signed FIA Formula 3 runner-up Théo Pourchaire, who briefly debuted in Formula 2 with HWA Racelab in the final rounds of 2020. He replaced Marcus Armstrong, who left the team to join DAMS.

MP Motorsport hired FIA Formula 3 graduates Lirim Zendeli and Richard Verschoor. Giuliano Alesi left the team and the series to join Super Formula Lights.

Charouz Racing System fielded a new line-up as Pedro Piquet vacated his seat and left Formula 2 after one year in the series, citing financial reasons. Louis Delétraz also left the team to join the European Le Mans Series. Charouz hired FIA Formula 3 graduate David Beckmann and former Campos driver Guilherme Samaia.

DAMS parted ways with Sean Gelael, who left Formula 2 after six years in the championship and its predecessor GP2 Series to join the World Endurance Championship. The team hired former Trident driver Roy Nissany to partner Marcus Armstrong.

Campos Racing hired Ralph Boschung, who deputised for the team at the final round of the 2020 season and previously raced for them in 2017. Boschung was signed alongside reigning Formula Regional European champion Gianluca Petecof. Jack Aitken left the team to compete in the GT World Challenge Europe series.

HWA Racelab entered a new driver line-up with FIA Formula 3 graduates Matteo Nannini and Alessio Deledda. Nannini will combine his Formula 2 campaign with a second season in FIA Formula 3. Artem Markelov left the team and the series after seven years in Formula 2 and GP2.

Trident signed FIA Formula 3 graduate Bent Viscaal to replace Roy Nissany.

=== Mid-season changes ===
Matteo Nannini left HWA Racelab and the championship after the first round, citing sponsorship reasons and his desire to focus on his FIA Formula 3 campaign. He was replaced by former Campos driver Jack Aitken for the following three rounds.

Nannini returned to the championship for the third round at the Baku City Circuit, replacing Campos driver Gianluca Petecof who left the team for budgetary reasons.

David Beckmann left Charouz Racing System prior to the fifth round at the Autodromo Nazionale di Monza, citing his financial situation. Enzo Fittipaldi was promoted from Charouz's FIA Formula 3 outfit to replace him. Beckmann was then hired by Campos to replace Matteo Nannini. The round also saw Jake Hughes join HWA Racelab in place of the injured Jack Aitken.

The seventh race at Jeddah Corniche Circuit saw four drivers promoted from the 2021 FIA Formula 3 Championship to make their Formula 2 debuts. Williams Driver Academy member Logan Sargeant replaced Jake Hughes at HWA Racelab and Olli Caldwell took David Beckmann's seat at Campos. MP Motorsport featured an all-new lineup, hiring FIA Formula 3 runner up Jack Doohan and third-place finisher Clément Novalak to replace Richard Verschoor and Lirim Zendeli, both of whom left the team for financial reasons.

Jake Hughes returned to HWA Racelab for the final race of the championship at Yas Marina Circuit, replacing Logan Sargeant. Charouz Racing System driver Enzo Fittipaldi was ruled out of the final race due to injuries suffered in a crash during the Jeddah feature race. Richard Verschoor returned to the championship to replace him.

== Calendar ==
A provisional calendar was published in November 2020. An updated version due to the postponement of the 2021 Australian Grand Prix, which required several Grands Prix to change dates, was revealed in January 2021.

Round	Circuit	Sprint races	Feature race
1	Bahrain International Circuit, Sakhir	27 March	28 March
2	Circuit de Monaco, Monte Carlo	21–22 May	22 May
3	(Azerbaijan) Baku City Circuit, Baku	5 June	6 June
4	(United Kingdom) Silverstone Circuit, Silverstone	17 July	18 July
5	(Italy) Autodromo Nazionale di Monza, Monza	11 September	12 September
6	(Russia) Sochi Autodrom, Sochi	25 September	26 September
7	(Saudi Arabia) Jeddah Corniche Circuit, Jeddah	4 December	5 December
8	(United Arab Emirates) Yas Marina Circuit, Abu Dhabi	11 December	12 December

=== Calendar changes ===
As a consequence of cost-cutting measures, the Formula 2 and Formula 3 championships adopted a new format. The two championships alternated between Grands Prix meetings and didn't appear together on the support race bill. Although this reduced the number of rounds, both championships ran three races at a Grand Prix instead of two, keeping the overall number of races the same as in previous years. The format change was designed to cut costs for teams competing in both championships by allowing them to rotate staff between each championship.

As the 2020 championship was disrupted by the COVID-19 pandemic, the 2021 calendar featured substantial revisions:

- The Mugello round and one of the rounds at the Red Bull Ring, the Silverstone Circuit and the Bahrain International Circuit were removed from the schedule as these rounds were run in support of one-off Grands Prix.
- The Barcelona, Spa-Francorchamps, Hungaroring and the second Red Bull Ring rounds were removed from the schedule to make way for the new weekend format.
- The Monaco, Baku and Yas Marina rounds returned after having been cancelled in 2020.
- The championship made its début at the Jeddah Corniche Circuit and running in support of the Saudi Arabian Grand Prix, a brand-new event on the Formula 1 calendar.

The Circuit Zandvoort had been included on the 2020 calendar, but was removed from the schedule in response to the COVID-19 pandemic. It was initially expected that the round would feature on the 2021 calendar, but it was not included on the provisional calendar. The circuit was included on the Formula 3 calendar instead.

== Regulation changes ==
=== Sporting changes ===
The weekend format was changed with two sprint races held on Saturday and the feature race with mandatory pit stop on Sunday. Qualifying determined the grid of the feature race and the first sprint race; the grid for the first sprint race was set by reversing the top ten qualifying positions. The grid of the second race was formed by results of the first sprint race, with top ten finishers reversed. The addition of a third race to the weekend schedule saw teams provided with an extra set of tyres.

== Season report ==
=== Round 1: Bahrain ===
Guanyu Zhou set the fastest time in qualifying at the Bahrain International Circuit, giving him pole position for the feature race. Théo Pourchaire started the first sprint race from pole position by virtue of qualifying 10th, but he lost the lead to Liam Lawson at the first corner and later retired with mechanical issues. Lawson held the lead for the rest of the race to claim victory on his Formula 2 debut.

Jüri Vips started the second sprint race from pole position after finishing the first race in 10th place, but was overtaken by Zhou in the early laps. The safety car was brought out after Lawson and Felipe Drugovich collided, and a number of drivers elected to make a pit stop. Oscar Piastri, who started the race in sixth place, took the lead on the final lap to achieve his first Formula 2 race win. Second-placed Christian Lundgaard was demoted to ninth by a penalty for colliding with Lirim Zendeli, but was later reinstated to the podium after it emerged he had served his penalty during his pit stop.

Lundgaard took the lead of the feature race at the first corner from pole-sitter Zhou, but was later overtaken by Piastri. A safety car caused by Gianluca Petecof's fire extinguisher deploying allowed Marcus Armstrong to take the lead after all drivers had completed their mandatory pit stops. The lead then passed between Piastri and Richard Verschoor before Zhou, who was in sixth place after the pit stop phase, reclaimed first position with four laps remaining. Piastri was then eliminated from the race after colliding with Dan Ticktum. Zhou took the chequered flag to claim his first feature race victory in Formula 2. Zhou led the championship after the first round by 11 points over second-placed Liam Lawson.

=== Round 2: Monaco ===
Théo Pourchaire was fastest in qualifying at the Circuit de Monaco, with Guanyu Zhou starting the opening sprint race from pole position. Christian Lundgaard challenged for the lead until an engine failure halfway into the race forced his retirement, allowing Zhou to take his second consecutive race victory.

The second sprint race was run in wet track conditions. A pre-race engine issue forced pole-sitter Marcus Armstrong to start the race from the pit lane. Liam Lawson therefore started from the front, but lost the lead to Oscar Piastri at the first corner before retaking first place a few laps later. UNI-Virtuosi were the only team to change to dry-weather tyres, but Zhou and Felipe Drugovich lost large amounts of time before pitting again and returning to wet-weather tyres. Lawson crossed the finish line first, but was later disqualified for a technical infringement. Dan Ticktum, who had earlier passed Piastri for second place, was awarded the victory.

Pole-sitter Pourchaire controlled the feature race to become the youngest driver to win an FIA Formula 2 race. Robert Shwartzman had qualified and ran in second place before a slow pit stop dropped him out of the podium positions. Ticktum was forced into retirement in the closing laps after coming to a halt whilst battling Piastri for third place. After the second round, Zhou had extended his lead in the championship to 16 points over second-placed Piastri.

=== Round 3: Azerbaijan ===
Liam Lawson set the fastest qualifying time at the Baku City Circuit and Robert Shwartzman started the first race from pole position. Shwartzman controlled the race to take his first podium and victory of the season, whilst Lawson and Oscar Piastri were eliminated on the first lap due to an accident caused by Felipe Drugovich. The podium was completed by Dan Ticktum, who had overtaken four cars throughout the race, including third-placed finisher Guanyu Zhou.

Bent Viscaal started the second race, the 100th FIA Formula 2 race, on pole position. Six drivers retired from the race, including championship leader Zhou after colliding with Ticktum at the first corner. David Beckmann took the lead from Viscaal early on, but was later passed by Jüri Vips, who claimed his first Formula 2 race win. Lawson, Piastri and Ticktum all recovered to score points after being at the back of the grid on the opening lap.

Vips took the lead of the feature race from Lawson at the first corner. Vips' frontrunning rivals were unable to challenge him due to penalties and collisions; Lawson was issued a time penalty for an aggressive defence against Théo Pourchaire, and Ticktum was penalised after a collision that eliminated Marcus Armstrong and Pourchaire from the race. Pourchaire was later taken to hospital with a fractured arm. Second-placed Piastri was later handed a time penalty for an unsafe release in the pits. Vips took the chequered flag to claim his second consecutive victory. Despite failing to score in the feature or second sprint races, Zhou maintained the lead of the championship after the third round, albeit with his advantage over Piastri cut to five points.

=== Round 4: United Kingdom ===
Oscar Piastri topped qualifying at Silverstone Circuit and Christian Lundgaard started on reverse-grid pole position for the first sprint race. Robert Shwartzman, who started the race in fourth place, took the lead before the first corner and held his position to take his second win of the season. Guanyu Zhou spun on the first lap and retired from the race, allowing Piastri to take the championship lead.

Richard Verschoor started on pole position for the second sprint race and controlled the race to claim his first Formula 2 victory. The race was interrupted by two safety car periods, the first coming after a heavy collision between Alessio Deledda and Ralph Boschung. Marcus Armstrong finished second to claim his first podium finish of the season.

Zhou took the lead of the feature race from pole-sitter Piastri before the first corner. Dan Ticktum later passed Piastri during the pit stops, and Piastri successfully defended third place after battling Verschoor on the final lap. Piastri held the championship lead at the conclusion of the fourth round, five points ahead of Zhou.

=== Round 5: Italy ===
Oscar Piastri took a second pole position in qualifying at the Autodromo Nazionale di Monza, beating Jehan Daruvala by 0.041 seconds. David Beckmann took reverse-grid pole position for the opening sprint race but lost the lead to Jüri Vips at the first corner. The race was interrupted by a safety car due to a collision between Dan Ticktum and Felipe Drugovich. Vips was later passed by Théo Pourchaire who took his second Formula 2 victory.

Beckmann again claimed reverse-grid pole position for the second sprint race, but was again passed at the first corner, this time by Daruvala. Daruvala controlled the race to take his first win of the season. The podium was completed by Bent Viscaal, who claimed Trident's first ever Formula 2 podium finish, and Robert Shwartzman.

Pole-sitter Piastri maintained his lead at the start of the feature race. The safety car was deployed after Vips stopped on track with a mechanical issue and Ticktum took the lead by electing not to make a pit stop. A second safety car period came later in the race when Liam Lawson broke down, allowing Piastri to regain the lead as Ticktum pitted. Ticktum moved from tenth place up to third in the closing laps with his fresh tyres, however his progress was halted as the race ended under the safety car due to a collision between Beckmann and Viscaal. This ensured Piastri would take his first Formula 2 feature race victory to extend his championship lead to 15 points over Guanyu Zhou.

=== Round 6: Russia ===
Oscar Piastri took yet another pole position beating Jehan Daruvala yet again. Sprint Race 1 was postponed to Sprint Race 2 timing and Sprint Race 2 was cancelled due to heavy rains. Dan Ticktum took reverse grid pole and controlled the race from start to finish, leading Juri Vips and Robert Shwartzman, while the top 2 in the championship did not score points at all.

Oscar Piastri took his second consecutive Feature Race to extend his championship lead. He led Pouchaire and Daruvala. Daruvala pressured Boschung into a lock-up taking the place. Championship contender Zhou only finished sixth.

=== Round 7: Saudi Arabia ===
Oscar Piastri took his 4th pole position in a row beating his teammate, Robert Shwartzman. Marcus Armstrong took the win in Sprint 1. Oscar Piastri reclaimed the top of the podium in Sprint 2, and he ended up taking his third consectutive Feature Race to continue to extend his championship lead.

=== Round 8: Abu Dhabi ===
Oscar Piastri once again took pole position, making it 5 consecutive feature race starts from first on the grid. He won his fourth consecutive Feature Race to conclude his championship season.

== Results and standings ==
=== Season summary ===
Round		Circuit	Pole position	Fastest lap	Winning driver	Winning team	Report
1	S1	Bahrain International Circuit		(Germany) Lirim Zendeli	(New Zealand) Liam Lawson	(United Kingdom) Hitech Grand Prix	Report
1	S2	Bahrain International Circuit		(Switzerland) Ralph Boschung	(Australia) Oscar Piastri	(Italy) Prema Racing	Report
1	F	Bahrain International Circuit	(China) Zhou Guanyu	(Russia) Robert Shwartzman	(China) Zhou Guanyu	(United Kingdom) UNI-Virtuosi Racing	Report
2	S1	Circuit de Monaco		(Estonia) Jüri Vips	(China) Zhou Guanyu	(United Kingdom) UNI-Virtuosi Racing	Report
2	S2	Circuit de Monaco		(Russia) Robert Shwartzman	(United Kingdom) Dan Ticktum	(United Kingdom) Carlin	Report
2	F	Circuit de Monaco	(France) Théo Pourchaire	(China) Zhou Guanyu	(France) Théo Pourchaire	(France) ART Grand Prix	Report
3	S1	(Azerbaijan) Baku City Circuit		(France) Théo Pourchaire	(Russia) Robert Shwartzman	(Italy) Prema Racing	Report
3	S2	(Azerbaijan) Baku City Circuit		(Australia) Oscar Piastri	(Estonia) Jüri Vips	(United Kingdom) Hitech Grand Prix	Report
3	F	(Azerbaijan) Baku City Circuit	(New Zealand) Liam Lawson	(United Kingdom) Dan Ticktum	(Estonia) Jüri Vips	(United Kingdom) Hitech Grand Prix	Report
4	S1	(United Kingdom) Silverstone Circuit		(Australia) Oscar Piastri	(Russia) Robert Shwartzman	(Italy) Prema Racing	Report
4	S2	(United Kingdom) Silverstone Circuit		(Australia) Oscar Piastri	(Netherlands) Richard Verschoor	(Netherlands) MP Motorsport	Report
4	F	(United Kingdom) Silverstone Circuit	(Australia) Oscar Piastri	(India) Jehan Daruvala	(China) Zhou Guanyu	(United Kingdom) UNI-Virtuosi Racing	Report
5	S1	(Italy) Autodromo Nazionale di Monza		(France) Théo Pourchaire	(France) Théo Pourchaire	(France) ART Grand Prix	Report
5	S2	(Italy) Autodromo Nazionale di Monza		(Australia) Oscar Piastri	(India) Jehan Daruvala	(United Kingdom) Carlin	Report
5	F	(Italy) Autodromo Nazionale di Monza	(Australia) Oscar Piastri	(New Zealand) Liam Lawson	(Australia) Oscar Piastri	(Italy) Prema Racing	Report
6	S1	(Russia) Sochi Autodrom		(France) Théo Pourchaire	(United Kingdom) Dan Ticktum	(United Kingdom) Carlin	Report
6	S2	(Russia) Sochi Autodrom		Race cancelled			Report
6	F	(Russia) Sochi Autodrom	(Australia) Oscar Piastri	(New Zealand) Liam Lawson	(Australia) Oscar Piastri	(Italy) Prema Racing	Report
7	S1	(Saudi Arabia) Jeddah Corniche Circuit		(Russia) Robert Shwartzman	(New Zealand) Marcus Armstrong	(France) DAMS	Report
7	S2	(Saudi Arabia) Jeddah Corniche Circuit		(Australia) Oscar Piastri	(Australia) Oscar Piastri	(Italy) Prema Racing	Report
7	F	(Saudi Arabia) Jeddah Corniche Circuit	(Australia) Oscar Piastri	(Australia) Oscar Piastri	(Australia) Oscar Piastri	(Italy) Prema Racing	Report
8	S1	(United Arab Emirates) Yas Marina Circuit		(United Kingdom) Olli Caldwell	(India) Jehan Daruvala	(United Kingdom) Carlin	Report
8	S2	(United Arab Emirates) Yas Marina Circuit		(Israel) Roy Nissany	(China) Zhou Guanyu	(United Kingdom) UNI-Virtuosi Racing	Report
8	F	(United Arab Emirates) Yas Marina Circuit	(Australia) Oscar Piastri	(France) Théo Pourchaire	(Australia) Oscar Piastri	(Italy) Prema Racing	Report

=== Scoring system ===
Points were awarded to the top eight classified finishers in the Sprint races, and to the top ten classified finishers in the Feature race. The pole-sitter in the feature race also received four points, and two points were given to the driver who set the fastest lap in both the feature and sprint races if that driver finished inside the top ten. No point was awarded if the fastest lap time was achieved by a driver who was classified outside the top ten. No extra points were awarded to the pole-sitter in the sprint races as the grid for the first sprint race was set by reversing the top ten qualifiers and the grid for the second sprint race was based on the results of the first race.

Sprint race points

Points were awarded to the top eight classified finishers, excluding the fastest lap points which were given to the top ten classified finishers.

Position	1st	2nd	3rd	4th	5th	6th	7th	8th	FL
Points	15	12	10	8	6	4	2	1	2

Feature race points

Points were awarded to the top ten classified finishers. Bonus points were awarded to the pole-sitter and to the driver who set the fastest lap and finished in the top ten.

Position	1st	2nd	3rd	4th	5th	6th	7th	8th	9th	10th	Pole	FL
Points	25	18	15	12	10	8	6	4	2	1	4	2

=== Drivers' championship ===
Pos.	Driver	BHR (Bahrain)			MON (Monaco)			BAK (Azerbaijan)			SIL (United Kingdom)			MNZ (Italy)			SOC (Russia)			JDH^{‡} (Saudi Arabia)			YMC (United Arab Emirates)			Points
Pos.	Driver	SR1	SR2	FR	SR1	SR2	FR	SR1	SR2	FR	SR1	SR2	FR	SR1	SR2	FR	SR1	SR2	FR	SR1	SR2	FR	SR1	SR2	FR	Points
1	(Australia) Oscar Piastri	5	1	19†	8	2	2	Ret	8^{F}	2	6^{F}	4^{F}	3^{P}	4	7^{F}	1^{P}	9	C	1^{P}	8	1^{F}	1^{P F}	3	Ret	1^{P}	252.5
2	(Russia) Robert Shwartzman	4	Ret	7^{F}	Ret	10^{F}	4	1	5	3	1	15	5	6	3	6	3	C	4	5^{F}	3	2	4	2	5	192
3	(China) Zhou Guanyu	7	3	1^{P}	1	15	5^{F}	3	Ret	13	Ret	11	1	2	8	2	DNS	C	6	17	8	4	8	1	2	183
4	(United Kingdom) Dan Ticktum	8	Ret	2	6	1	Ret	2	6	8^{F}	8	3	2	Ret	11	3	1	C	5	7	4	10	6	4	6	159.5
5	(France) Théo Pourchaire	Ret	6	8	7	4	1^{P}	5^{F}	9	Ret	5	10	8	1^{F}	10	4	5^{F}	C	2	Ret	6	Ret	7	9	4^{F}	140
6	(Estonia) Jüri Vips	10	16	13	5^{F}	3	8	8	1	1	2	6	7	8	6	Ret	2	C	Ret	3	Ret	6	12	Ret	8	120
7	(India) Jehan Daruvala	2	4	6	11	8	Ret	4	3	7	12	19	10^{F}	9	1	5	12	C	3	10	14	11	1	7	11	113
8	(Brazil) Felipe Drugovich	16	14	9	2	14	3	14	10	4	4	7	6	Ret	17	12	DNS	C	DNS	4	10	5	2	5	3	105
9	(New Zealand) Liam Lawson	1	Ret	3	9	DSQ	7	Ret	7	6^{P}	7	5	11	5	4	Ret^{F}	Ret	C	7^{F}	2	Ret	9	5	6	Ret	103
10	(Switzerland) Ralph Boschung	Ret	17^{F}	15	4	5	6	6	Ret	5	14	Ret	14	14	9	14	6	C	19†	15	9	3	9	3	9	59.5
11	(Netherlands) Richard Verschoor	Ret	5	4	13	6	10	12	Ret	14	10	1	4	Ret	13	DSQ	8	C	8				Ret	11	10	56
12	(Denmark) Christian Lundgaard	6	2	12	Ret	Ret	12	11	Ret	9	3	13	21	3	14	10	7	C	9	6	15	7	15	18	15	50
13	(New Zealand) Marcus Armstrong	Ret	10	5	10	Ret	Ret	7	Ret	Ret	9	2	12	11	15	9	11	C	11	1	Ret	8	10	Ret	7	49
14	(Netherlands) Bent Viscaal	13	12	17	14	11	11	10	4	17	16	Ret	13	7	2	15†	Ret	C	Ret	9	2	12	13	10	12	34
15	(Germany) David Beckmann	3	7	11	12	Ret	13	9	2	12	13	8	15	10	5	16†	15	C	10							32
16	(Israel) Roy Nissany	12	15	Ret	3	Ret	9	16	16	16	Ret	12	16	Ret	18	8	16	C	15	13	11	15	14	17^{F}	13	16
17	(Germany) Lirim Zendeli	9^{F}	Ret	18	15	7	Ret	13	Ret	10	11	9	9	15†	12	7	10	C	16							13
18	(United Kingdom) Jake Hughes													12	Ret	13	4	C	18				Ret	13	Ret	8
19	(Australia) Jack Doohan																			11	5	13	11	8	Ret	7
20	(Brazil) Enzo Fittipaldi													Ret	16	11	17	C	12	12	7	Ret				2
21	(Japan) Marino Sato	15	8	14	19†	Ret	14	18	13	15	NC	16	19	NC	20	Ret	14	C	14	Ret	13	18	19	16	17	1
22	(Italy) Matteo Nannini	14	9	10				15	11	DNS	15	14	18													1
23	(United Kingdom) Jack Aitken				16	9	18	Ret	12	11	17	18	17													0
24	(Brazil) Guilherme Samaia	11	11	16	17	13	15	17	14	18	Ret	17	20	Ret	Ret	Ret	13	C	13	Ret	Ret	17	16	12	16	0
25	(Italy) Alessio Deledda	18	Ret	Ret	18	12	17	Ret	15	19	Ret	Ret	22	13	19	Ret	18	C	17	Ret	Ret	20	18	Ret	19	0
26	(United Kingdom) Olli Caldwell																			18	12	16	20^{F}	15	18	0
27	(Brazil) Gianluca Petecof	17	13	Ret	Ret	Ret	16																			0
28	(France) Clément Novalak																			14	Ret	19	17	14	14	0
29	(United States) Logan Sargeant																			16	Ret	14				0
Pos.	Driver	SR1	SR2	FR	SR1	SR2	FR	SR1	SR2	FR	SR1	SR2	FR	SR1	SR2	FR	SR1	SR2	FR	SR1	SR2	FR	SR1	SR2	FR	Points
Pos.	Driver	BHR (Bahrain)			MON (Monaco)			BAK (Azerbaijan)			SIL (United Kingdom)			MNZ (Italy)			SOC (Russia)			JDH (Saudi Arabia)			YMC (United Arab Emirates)			Points

Key
Colour	Result
Gold	Winner
Silver	Second place
Bronze	Third place
Green	Other points position
Blue	Other classified position
Blue	Not classified, finished (NC)
Purple	Not classified, retired (Ret)
Red	Did not qualify (DNQ)
Black	Disqualified (DSQ)
White	Did not start (DNS)
White	Race cancelled (C)
Blank	Did not practice (DNP)
Blank	Excluded (EX)
Blank	Did not arrive (DNA)
Blank	Withdrawn (WD)
Blank	Did not enter (empty cell)
Annotation	Meaning
P	Pole position
F	Fastest lap

Notes:

- † – Drivers did not finish the race, but were classified as they completed more than 90% of the race distance.
- ‡ – Half points were awarded for the feature race, as less than 75% of the scheduled distance was completed.

=== Teams' championship ===
Pos.	Team	BHR (Bahrain)			MON (Monaco)			BAK (Azerbaijan)			SIL (United Kingdom)			MNZ (Italy)			SOC (Russia)			JDH (Saudi Arabia)			YMC (United Arab Emirates)			Points
Pos.	Team	SR1	SR2	FR	SR1	SR2	FR	SR1	SR2	FR	SR1	SR2	FR	SR1	SR2	FR	SR1	SR2	FR	SR1	SR2	FR	SR1	SR2	FR	Points
1	(Italy) Prema Powerteam	4	1	7^{F}	8	2	2	1	5	2	1	4^{F}	3^{P}	4	3	1^{P}	3	C	1^{P}	5^{F}	1^{F}	1^{P F}	3	2	1^{P}	444.5
1	(Italy) Prema Powerteam	5	Ret	19†	Ret	10^{F}	4	Ret	8^{F}	3	6^{F}	15	5	6	7^{F}	6	9	C	4	8	3	2	4	Ret	5	444.5
2	(United Kingdom) UNI-Virtuosi Racing	7	3	1^{P}	1	14	3	3	10	4	4	7	1	2	8	2	DNS	C	6	4	8	4	2	1	2	288
2	(United Kingdom) UNI-Virtuosi Racing	16	14	9	2	15	5^{F}	14	Ret	13	Ret	11	6	Ret	17	12	DNS	C	DNS	17	10	5	8	5	3	288
3	(United Kingdom) Carlin	2	4	2	6	1	Ret	2	3	7	8	3	2	9	1	3	1	C	3	7	4	10	1	4	6	272.5
3	(United Kingdom) Carlin	8	Ret	6	11	8	Ret	4	6	8^{F}	12	19	10^{F}	Ret	11	5	12	C	5	10	14	11	6	7	11	272.5
4	(United Kingdom) Hitech Grand Prix	1	16	3	5^{F}	3	7	8	1	1	2	5	7	5	4	Ret	2	C	7^{F}	2	Ret	6	5	6	8	223
4	(United Kingdom) Hitech Grand Prix	10	Ret	13	9	DSQ	8	Ret	7	6^{P}	7	6	11	8	6	Ret	Ret	C	Ret	3	Ret	9	12	Ret	Ret	223
5	(France) ART Grand Prix	6	2	8	7	4	1^{P}	5^{F}	9	9	3	10	8	1^{F}	10	4	5^{F}	C	2	6	6	7	7	9	4^{F}	190
5	(France) ART Grand Prix	Ret	6	12	Ret	Ret	12	11	Ret	Ret	5	13	21	3	14	10	7	C	9	Ret	15	Ret	15	18	15	190
6	(Netherlands) MP Motorsport	9^{F}	5	4	13	6	10	12	Ret	10	10	1	4	15†	12	7	8	C	8	11	5	13	11	8	14	75
6	(Netherlands) MP Motorsport	Ret	Ret	18	15	7	Ret	13	Ret	14	11	9	9	Ret	13	DSQ	10	C	16	14	Ret	19	17	14	Ret	75
7	(Spain) Campos Racing	17	13	15	4	5	6	6	11	5	14	14	14	10	5	14	6	C	10	15	9	3	9	3	9	66.5
7	(Spain) Campos Racing	Ret	17^{F}	Ret	Ret	Ret	16	15	Ret	DNS	15	Ret	18	14	9	16†	15	C	19†	18	12	16	20^{F}	15	18	66.5
8	(France) DAMS	12	10	5	3	Ret	9	7	16	16	9	2	12	11	15	8	11	C	11	1	11	8	10	17^{F}	7	65
8	(France) DAMS	Ret	15	Ret	10	Ret	Ret	16	Ret	Ret	Ret	12	16	Ret	18	9	16	C	15	13	Ret	15	14	Ret	13	65
9	(Italy) Trident	13	8	14	14	11	11	10	4	15	16	16	13	7	2	15†	14	C	14	9	2	12	13	10	12	35
9	(Italy) Trident	15	12	17	19†	Ret	14	18	13	17	NC	Ret	19	NC	20	Ret	Ret	C	Ret	Ret	13	18	19	16	17	35
10	(Czech Republic) Charouz Racing System	3	7	11	12	13	13	9	2	12	13	8	15	Ret	16	11	13	C	12	12	7	17	16	11	10	28
10	(Czech Republic) Charouz Racing System	11	11	16	17	Ret	15	17	14	18	Ret	17	20	Ret	Ret	Ret	17	C	13	Ret	Ret	Ret	Ret	12	16	28
11	(Germany) HWA Racelab	14	9	10	16	9	17	Ret	12	11	17	18	17	12	19	13	4	C	17	16	Ret	14	18	13	19	9
11	(Germany) HWA Racelab	18	Ret	Ret	18	12	18	Ret	15	19	Ret	Ret	22	13	Ret	Ret	18	C	18	Ret	Ret	20	Ret	Ret	Ret	9
Pos.	Team	SR1	SR2	FR	SR1	SR2	FR	SR1	SR2	FR	SR1	SR2	FR	SR1	SR2	FR	SR1	SR2	FR	SR1	SR2	FR	SR1	SR2	FR	Points
Pos.	Team	BHR (Bahrain)			MON (Monaco)			BAK (Azerbaijan)			SIL (United Kingdom)			MNZ (Italy)			SOC (Russia)			JDH (Saudi Arabia)			YMC (United Arab Emirates)			Points

Key
Colour	Result
Gold	Winner
Silver	Second place
Bronze	Third place
Green	Other points position
Blue	Other classified position
Blue	Not classified, finished (NC)
Purple	Not classified, retired (Ret)
Red	Did not qualify (DNQ)
Black	Disqualified (DSQ)
White	Did not start (DNS)
White	Race cancelled (C)
Blank	Did not practice (DNP)
Blank	Excluded (EX)
Blank	Did not arrive (DNA)
Blank	Withdrawn (WD)
Blank	Did not enter (empty cell)
Annotation	Meaning
P	Pole position
F	Fastest lap

Notes:

- † – Drivers did not finish the race, but were classified as they completed more than 90% of the race distance.
- ‡ – Half points were awarded for the sprint race, as less than 75% of the scheduled distance was completed.
