= 2026 Shanghai ePrix =

Race 12 of 17 of the 2025–26 Formula E season
← Previous race	Next race →
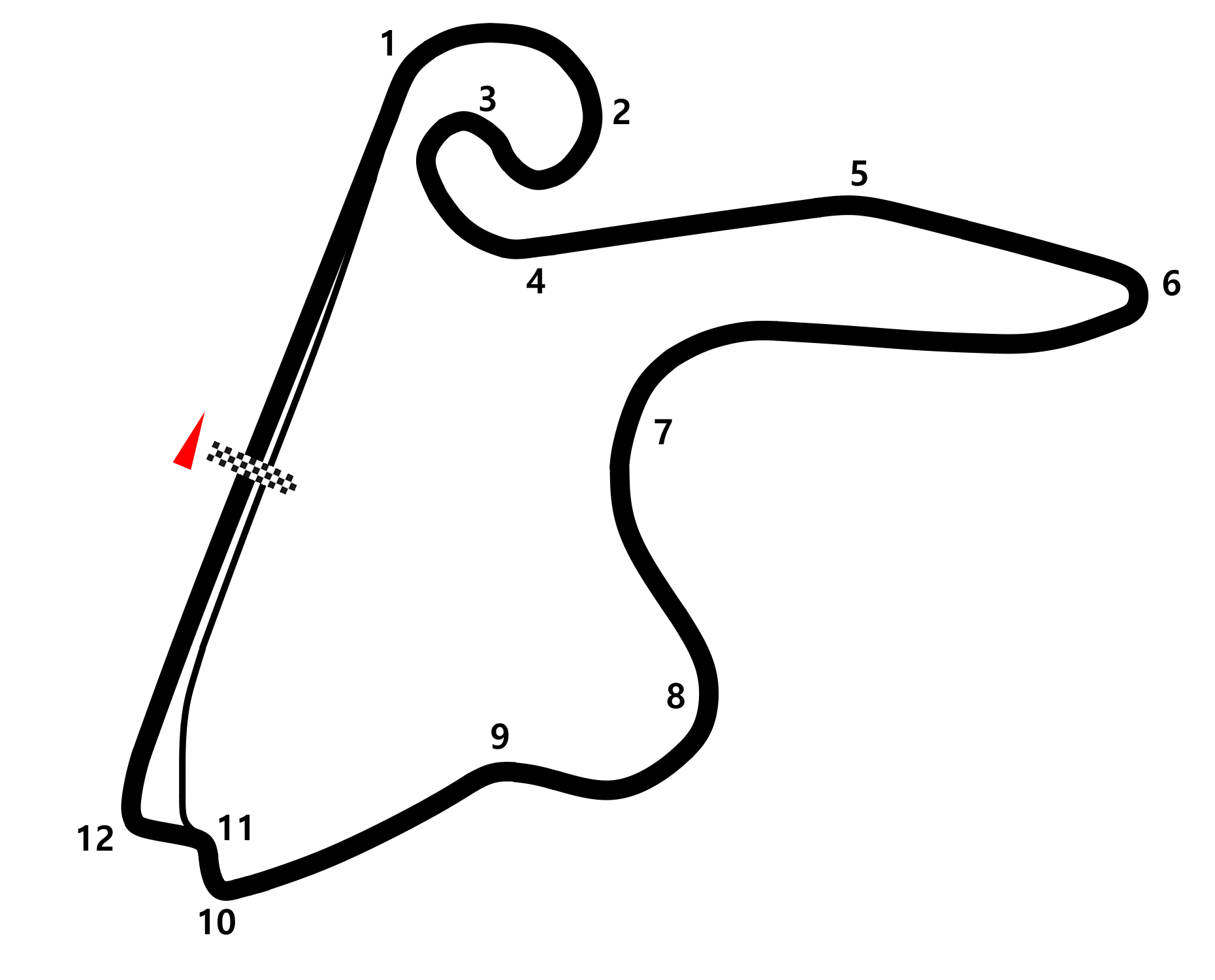

Race details
- Date: 4 July 2026
- Official name: 2026 Shanghai E-Prix
- Location: Shanghai International Circuit, Shanghai
- Course: Permanent racing facility
- Course length: 3.051 km (1.896 mi)

Pole position
Driver	(Germany) Pascal Wehrlein	Porsche
- Time: 1:09.260

Fastest lap
Driver	(Switzerland) Edoardo Mortara	Mahindra
- Time: 1:11.890

Podium
First	(Germany) Pascal Wehrlein	Porsche
Second	(Portugal) António Félix da Costa	Jaguar
Third	(United Kingdom) Jake Dennis	Andretti

2026 Shanghai ePrix
Race 13 of 17 of the 2025–26 Formula E season
← Previous race	Next race →
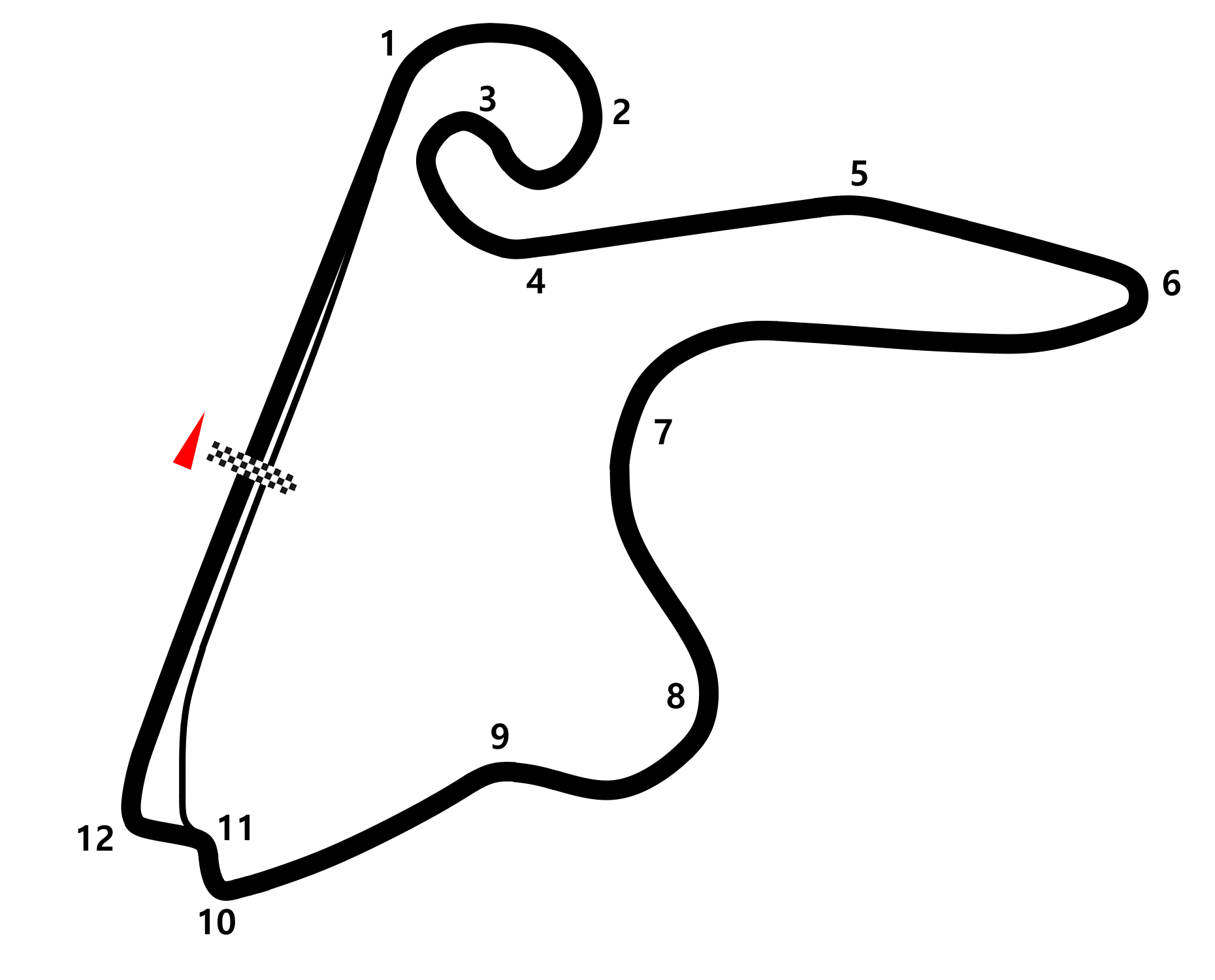

Race details
- Date: 5 July 2026
- Official name: 2026 Shanghai E-Prix
- Location: Shanghai International Circuit, Shanghai
- Course: Permanent racing facility
- Course length: 3.051 km (1.896 mi)

Pole position
Driver	(Brazil) Felipe Drugovich	Andretti
- Time: 1:10.609

Fastest lap
Driver	(United Kingdom) Oliver Rowland	Nissan
- Time: 1:10.945

Podium
First	(Brazil) Lucas di Grassi	Lola Yamaha ABT
Second	(France) Jean-Éric Vergne	Citroën
Third	(Sweden) Joel Eriksson	Envision

The 2026 Shanghai ePrix was a pair of Formula E electric car races held at the Shanghai International Circuit in the outskirts of Shanghai, China on 4 and 5 July 2026. It served as the 12th and 13th rounds of the 2025–26 Formula E season, and marked the third edition of the Shanghai ePrix.

== Background ==
Mitch Evans entered the race as the leader in the Drivers' Championship with a 19 point lead over defending champion Oliver Rowland, followed by Edoardo Mortara (25 points behind).

Prior to the race, Jaguar held a 30 point lead over Porsche in the Teams' Championship, with Mahindra Racing in third. In the Manufacturers' Trophy, Porsche held a 41 point lead over Jaguar, with Mahindra in third.

== Classification ==
All times are in UTC+8.

=== Race 1 ===
==== Qualifying ====
Qualification was originally set to take place at 10:40 AM on 4 July. However, the session was rescheduled to start at 8:00 AM due to adverse weather conditions.

Group draw
Group A	(New Zealand) EVA	(Switzerland) MOR	(United Kingdom) DEN	(Switzerland) MUE	(Switzerland) BUE	(Spain) MAR	(Sweden) ERI	(United Kingdom) BAR	(France) JEV	(Brazil) DIG
Group B	(United Kingdom) ROW	(Germany) WEH	(Portugal) DAC	(New Zealand) CAS	(Netherlands) DEV	(Brazil) DRU	(United Kingdom) TIC	(Germany) GUE	(France) NAT	(Barbados) MAL

==== Qualifying duels ====
Quarter-finals
A2	(United Kingdom) Jake Dennis
A3	(Switzerland) Sébastien Buemi
A1	(New Zealand) Mitch Evans
A4	(France) Jean-Éric Vergne
B2	(Germany) Maximilian Günther
B3	(United Kingdom) Dan Ticktum
B1	(Germany) Pascal Wehrlein
B4	(Portugal) Antonio Felix da Costa

Semi-finals
(United Kingdom) Jake Dennis
(New Zealand) Mitch Evans
(Germany) Maximilian Günther
(Germany) Pascal Wehrlein

Final
(New Zealand) Mitch Evans
(Germany) Pascal Wehrlein

==== Race ====
The race was originally set to start at 3:05 PM on 4 July. However, the session was rescheduled to start at 12:05 PM due to adverse weather conditions.

==== Standings after the race ====
Drivers' Championship standings

	Pos	Driver	Points
	1	(New Zealand) Mitch Evans	132
2	2	(Germany) Pascal Wehrlein	129
3	3	(Portugal) António Félix da Costa	111
1	4	(United Kingdom) Jake Dennis	109
3	5	(United Kingdom) Oliver Rowland	109

Teams' Championship standings

Pos	Team	Points
1	(United Kingdom) Jaguar	243
2	(Germany) Porsche	219
3	(India) Mahindra	172
4	(United States) Andretti	163
5	(Japan) Nissan	120

Manufacturers' Championship standings

Pos	Manufacturer	Points
1	(Germany) Porsche	364
2	(United Kingdom) Jaguar	309
3	(India) Mahindra	171
4	(Netherlands) Stellantis	170
5	(Japan) Nissan	144

- Notes: Only the top five positions are included for all three sets of standings.

=== Race 2 ===
==== Qualifying ====
Qualification was originally set to take place at 10:40 AM on 5 July. However, the session was rescheduled to start at 8:00 AM due to adverse weather conditions.

Group draw
Group A	(New Zealand) EVA	(Portugal) DAC	(United Kingdom) ROW	(Switzerland) MUE	(Netherlands) DEV	(Spain) MAR	(Sweden) ERI	(United Kingdom) BAR	(Germany) GUE	(Brazil) DIG
Group B	(Germany) WEH	(United Kingdom) DEN	(Switzerland) MOR	(New Zealand) CAS	(Switzerland) BUE	(Brazil) DRU	(United Kingdom) TIC	(France) JEV	(France) NAT	(Barbados) MAL

==== Qualifying duels ====
Quarter-finals
A2	(United Kingdom) Taylor Barnard
A3	(Spain) Pepe Martí
A1	(Switzerland) Nico Müller
A4	(United Kingdom) Oliver Rowland
B2	(Brazil) Felipe Drugovich
B3	(Switzerland) Edoardo Mortara
B1	(Germany) Pascal Wehrlein
B4	(Barbados) Zane Maloney

Semi-finals
(United Kingdom) Taylor Barnard
(United Kingdom) Oliver Rowland
(Brazil) Felipe Drugovich
(Germany) Pascal Wehrlein

Final
(United Kingdom) Taylor Barnard
(Brazil) Felipe Drugovich

==== Race ====
The race was originally set to start at 3:05 PM on 5 July. However, the session was rescheduled to start at 12:05 PM due to adverse weather conditions.

==== Standings after the race ====
Drivers' Championship standings

	Pos	Driver	Points
1	1	(Germany) Pascal Wehrlein	141
1	2	(New Zealand) Mitch Evans	132
2	3	(United Kingdom) Oliver Rowland	114
1	4	(Portugal) António Félix da Costa	111
1	5	(United Kingdom) Jake Dennis	109

Teams' Championship standings

	Pos	Team	Points
	1	(United Kingdom) Jaguar	243
	2	(Germany) Porsche	237
1	3	(United States) Andretti	174
1	4	(India) Mahindra	172
1	5	(United Kingdom) Envision	130

Manufacturers' Championship standings

	Pos	Manufacturer	Points
	1	(Germany) Porsche	384
	2	(United Kingdom) Jaguar	334
1	3	(Netherlands) Stellantis	192
1	4	(India) Mahindra	173
	5	(Japan) Nissan	151

- Notes: Only the top five positions are included for all three sets of standings.

== Notes ==
Previous race: 2026 Sanya ePrix	FIA Formula E World Championship; 2025–26 season	Next race: 2026 Tokyo ePrix
Previous race: 2025 Shanghai ePrix	Shanghai ePrix	Next race: 2027 Shanghai ePrix
