= 2024 Shanghai ePrix =

Race 11 of 16 of the 2023–24 Formula E season
← Previous race	Next race →
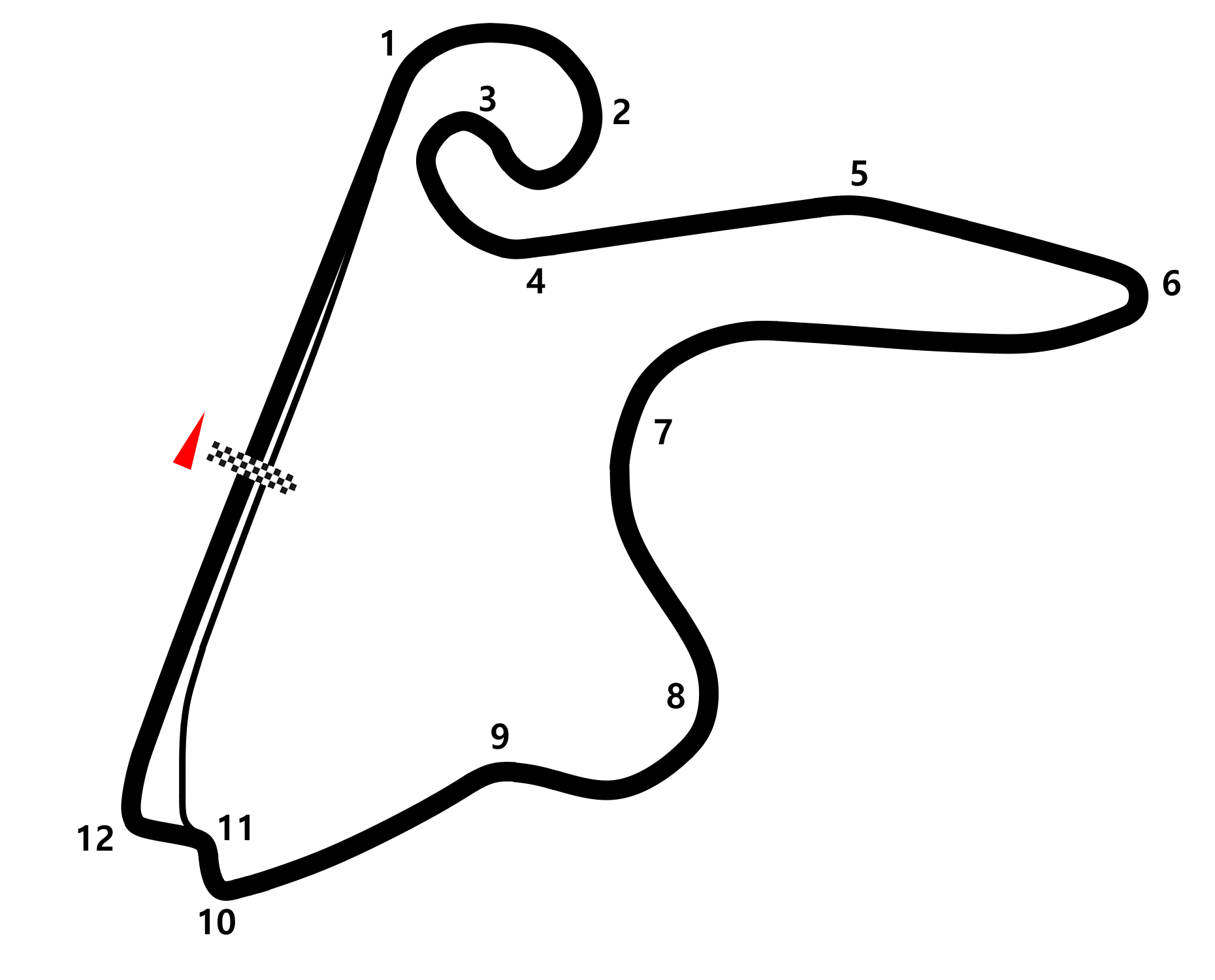

Race details
- Date: 25 May 2024
- Official name: 2024 Shanghai E-Prix
- Location: Shanghai International Circuit, Shanghai
- Course: Permanent racing facility
- Course length: 3.051 km (1.896 mi)
- Distance: 29 laps, 88.479 km (54.978 mi)

Pole position
Driver	(France) Jean-Éric Vergne	DS Penske
- Time: 1:13:322

Fastest lap
Driver	(United Kingdom) Jake Dennis	Andretti-Porsche
- Time: 1:15.965 on lap 23

Podium
First	(New Zealand) Mitch Evans	Jaguar
Second	(Germany) Pascal Wehrlein	Porsche
Third	(New Zealand) Nick Cassidy	Jaguar

2024 Shanghai ePrix
Race 12 of 16 of the 2023–24 Formula E season
← Previous race	Next race →
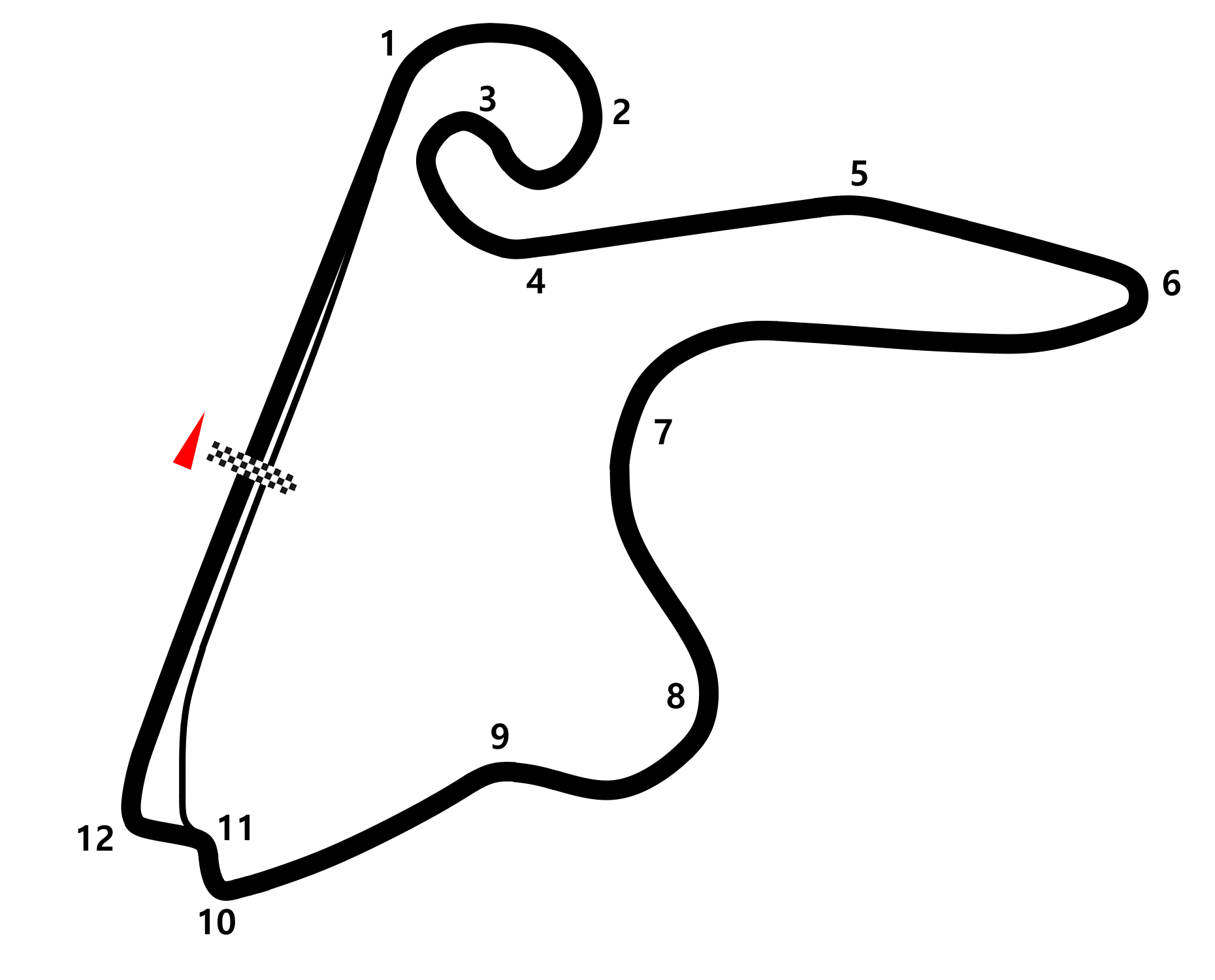

Race details
- Date: 26 May 2024
- Official name: 2024 Shanghai E-Prix
- Location: Shanghai International Circuit, Shanghai
- Course: Permanent racing facility
- Course length: 3.051 km (1.896 mi)
- Distance: 28 laps, 85.428 km (53.082 mi)

Pole position
Driver	(United Kingdom) Jake Hughes	McLaren-Nissan
- Time: 1:13.921

Fastest lap
Driver	(France) Norman Nato	Andretti-Porsche
- Time: 1:15:358

Podium
First	(Portugal) António Félix da Costa	Porsche
Second	(United Kingdom) Jake Hughes	McLaren-Nissan
Third	(France) Norman Nato	Andretti-Porsche

The 2024 Shanghai ePrix was a pair of Formula E electric car races held at the Shanghai International Circuit in the outskirts of Shanghai, China on 25 and 26 May 2024. It served as the 11th and 12th rounds of the 2023–24 Formula E season, and marked the first edition of the Shanghai ePrix and the first ePrix held in China since the 2019 Sanya ePrix.

The first race was won by Mitch Evans driving for Jaguar TCS Racing, with Pascal Wehrlein and Nick Cassidy in second and third place respectively.

The second race was won by António Félix da Costa driving for TAG Heuer Porsche Formula E Team, with Jake Hughes and Norman Nato in second and third place respectively.

== Classification ==
(All times are in UTC+8)

=== Race one ===
==== Qualification ====
Qualification took place at 10:20 AM on 25 May.

Group draw
Group A	(New Zealand) CAS	(United Kingdom) ROW	(New Zealand) EVA	(Germany) GUE	(Belgium) VAN	(France) FEN	(France) NAT	(Switzerland) BUE	(United Kingdom) TIC	(India) DAR	(Brazil) DIG
Group B	(Germany) WEH	(United Kingdom) DEN	(France) JEV	(Portugal) DAC	(United Kingdom) BIR	(United Kingdom) HUG	(Netherlands) FRI	(Switzerland) MUE	(Brazil) SET	(Switzerland) MOR	(Netherlands) DEV

===== Qualifying duels =====
Quarter-finals
A2	(United Kingdom) Oliver Rowland
A3	(France) Norman Nato
A1	(Belgium) Stoffel Vandoorne
A4	(New Zealand) Mitch Evans
B2	(France) Jean-Éric Vergne
B3	(Portugal) António Félix da Costa
B1	(United Kingdom) Jake Hughes
B4	(Germany) Pascal Wehrlein

Semi-finals
(United Kingdom) Oliver Rowland
(New Zealand) Mitch Evans
(France) Jean-Éric Vergne
(Germany) Pascal Wehrlein

Final
(United Kingdom) Oliver Rowland
(France) Jean-Éric Vergne

==== Overall classification ====
Pos.	No.	Driver	Team	A	B	QF	SF	F	Grid
1	25	(France) Jean-Éric Vergne	DS Penske	—N/a	1:14.144	1:13.687	1:13.471	1:13.322	1
2	22	(United Kingdom) Oliver Rowland	Nissan	1:14.252	—N/a	1:13.756	1:13.358	1:13:360	2
3	9	(New Zealand) Mitch Evans	Jaguar	1:14.307	—N/a	1:13.565	1:13.359	—N/a	3
4	94	(Germany) Pascal Wehrlein	Porsche	—N/a	1:14.246	1:13.449	1:13.624	—N/a	4
5	5	(United Kingdom) Jake Hughes	McLaren-Nissan	—N/a	1:14.140	1:13.483	—N/a	—N/a	5
6	13	(Portugal) António Félix da Costa	Porsche	—N/a	1:14.241	1:13.693	—N/a	—N/a	6
7	17	(France) Norman Nato	Andretti-Porsche	1:14.300	—N/a	1:13.824	—N/a	—N/a	7
8	2	(Belgium) Stoffel Vandoorne	DS Penske	1:14.242	—N/a	1:13.861	—N/a	—N/a	8
9	4	(Netherlands) Robin Frijns	Envision-Jaguar	—N/a	1:14.336	—N/a	—N/a	—N/a	9
10	37	(New Zealand) Nick Cassidy	Jaguar	1:14.316	—N/a	—N/a	—N/a	—N/a	10
11	1	(United Kingdom) Jake Dennis	Andretti-Porsche	—N/a	1:14.459	—N/a	—N/a	—N/a	11
12	16	(Switzerland) Sébastien Buemi	Envision-Jaguar	1:14.367	—N/a	—N/a	—N/a	—N/a	12
13	21	(Netherlands) Nyck de Vries	Mahindra	—N/a	1:14.523	—N/a	—N/a	—N/a	13
14	7	(Germany) Maximilian Günther	Maserati	1:14.384	—N/a	—N/a	—N/a	—N/a	14
15	51	(Switzerland) Nico Müller	ABT-Mahindra	—N/a	1:14.530	—N/a	—N/a	—N/a	15
16	11	(Brazil) Lucas di Grassi	ABT Cupra-Mahindra	1:14.384	—N/a	—N/a	—N/a	—N/a	16
17	3	(Brazil) Sérgio Sette Câmara	ERT	—N/a	1:14.580	—N/a	—N/a	—N/a	17
18	33	(United Kingdom) Dan Ticktum	ERT	1:14.481	—N/a	—N/a	—N/a	—N/a	18
19	8	(United Kingdom) Sam Bird	McLaren-Nissan	—N/a	1:14.601	—N/a	—N/a	—N/a	19
20	18	(India) Jehan Daruvala	Maserati	1:14.494	—N/a	—N/a	—N/a	—N/a	20
21	48	(Switzerland) Edoardo Mortara	Mahindra	—N/a	1:15.006	—N/a	—N/a	—N/a	21
22	23	(France) Sacha Fenestraz	Nissan	1:14.520	—N/a	—N/a	—N/a	—N/a	22

==== Race ====
The race took place on 25 May at 3:03 PM.

Pos.	No.	Driver	Team	Laps	Time/Retired	Grid	Points
1	9	(New Zealand) Mitch Evans	Jaguar	29	38:03:434	3	25
2	94	(Germany) Pascal Wehrlein	Porsche	29	+0.796	4	18
3	37	(New Zealand) Nick Cassidy	Jaguar	29	+1.498	10	15
4	22	(United Kingdom) Oliver Rowland	Nissan	29	+1.743	2	12
5	1	(United Kingdom) Jake Dennis	Andretti-Porsche	29	+2.361	11	10+1^{2}
6	25	(France) Jean-Éric Vergne	DS Penske	29	+2.599	1	8+3^{1}
7	21	(Netherlands) Nyck de Vries	Mahindra	29	+2.818	13	6
8	16	(Switzerland) Sébastien Buemi	Envision-Jaguar	29	+3.610	12	4
9	2	(Belgium) Stoffel Vandoorne	DS Penske	29	+4.095	8	2
10	11	(Brazil) Lucas di Grassi	ABT Cupra-Mahindra	29	+4.397	16	1
11	23	(France) Sacha Fenestraz	Nissan	29	+4.791	22	
12	4	(Netherlands) Robin Frijns	Envision-Jaguar	29	+5.083	9	
13	3	(Brazil) Sérgio Sette Câmara	ERT	29	+5.425	17	
14	17	(France) Norman Nato	Andretti-Porsche	29	+5.793	7	
15	51	(Switzerland) Nico Müller	ABT-Mahindra	29	+6.178	15	
16	5	(United Kingdom) Jake Hughes	McLaren-Nissan	29	+6.566	5	
17	8	(United Kingdom) Sam Bird	McLaren-Nissan	29	+6.944	19	
18	13	(Portugal) António Félix da Costa	Porsche	29	+7.165	6	
19	18	(India) Jehan Daruvala	Maserati	20	+7.372	20	
20	33	(United Kingdom) Dan Ticktum	ERT	29	+7.688	18	
21	7	(Germany) Maximilian Günther	Maserati	29	+13.165	14	
Ret	48	(Switzerland) Edoardo Mortara	Mahindra	16	Collision	21	

Notes:

- ^1 – Pole position.
- ^2 – Fastest lap.

==== Standings after the race ====
Drivers' Championship standings

	Pos	Driver	Points
	1	(New Zealand) Nick Cassidy	155
	2	(Germany) Pascal Wehrlein	142
	3	(United Kingdom) Oliver Rowland	130
1	4	(New Zealand) Mitch Evans	122
1	5	(United Kingdom) Jake Dennis	113

Teams' Championship standings

Pos	Team	Points
1	(United Kingdom) Jaguar	277
2	(Germany) Porsche	201
3	(Japan) Nissan	156
4	(United States) DS Penske	136
5	(United States) Andretti	135

Manufacturers' Trophy standings

Pos	Manufacturer	Points
1	(United Kingdom) Jaguar	306
2	(Germany) Porsche	293
3	(Japan) Nissan	214
4	(Netherlands) Stellantis	197
5	(India) Mahindra	33

- Notes: Only the top five positions are included for all three sets of standings.

=== Race two ===
==== Qualification ====
Qualification took place at 10:20 AM on 26 May.

Group draw
Group A	(New Zealand) CAS	(United Kingdom) ROW	(United Kingdom) DEN	(Germany) GUE	(Belgium) VAN	(France) FEN	(Switzerland) BUE	(Netherlands) FRI	(United Kingdom) TIC	(India) DAR	(Netherlands) DEV
Group B	(Germany) WEH	(New Zealand) EVA	(France) JEV	(Portugal) DAC	(United Kingdom) BIR	(United Kingdom) HUG	(France) NAT	(Switzerland) MUE	(Brazil) SET	(Switzerland) MOR	(Brazil) DIG

===== Qualifying duels =====
Quarter-finals
A2	(Belgium) Stoffel Vandoorne
A3	(New Zealand) Nick Cassidy
A1	(United Kingdom) Oliver Rowland
A4	(Netherlands) Nyck de Vries
B2	(Portugal) António Félix da Costa
B3	(New Zealand) Mitch Evans
B1	(United Kingdom) Jake Hughes
B4	(France) Norman Nato

Semi-finals
(Belgium) Stoffel Vandoorne
(Netherlands) Nyck de Vries
(Portugal) António Félix da Costa
(United Kingdom) Jake Hughes

Final
(Belgium) Stoffel Vandoorne
(United Kingdom) Jake Hughes

==== Overall classification ====
Pos.	No.	Driver	Team	A	B	QF	SF	F	Grid
1	5	(United Kingdom) Jake Hughes	McLaren-Nissan	—N/a	1:14.308	1:13.836	1:13.846	1:13.921	1
2	2	(Belgium) Stoffel Vandoorne	DS Penske	1:14.642	—N/a	1:13.666	1:13.854	1:13.922	2
3	13	(Portugal) António Félix da Costa	Porsche	—N/a	1:14.536	1:13.752	1:13.980	—N/a	3
4	21	(Netherlands) Nyck de Vries	Mahindra	1:14.654	—N/a	1:13.817	1:14.080	—N/a	4
5	37	(New Zealand) Nick Cassidy	Jaguar	1:14.650	—N/a	1:13.672	—N/a	—N/a	5
6	9	(New Zealand) Mitch Evans	Jaguar	—N/a	1:14.585	1:13.888	—N/a	—N/a	6
7	17	(France) Norman Nato	Andretti-Porsche	—N/a	1:14.618	1:13.909	—N/a	—N/a	7
8	22	(United Kingdom) Oliver Rowland	Nissan	1:14.629	—N/a	1:14.009	—N/a	—N/a	8
9	25	(France) Jean-Éric Vergne	DS Penske	—N/a	1:14.631	—N/a	—N/a	—N/a	9
10	7	(Germany) Maximilian Günther	Maserati	1:14.672	—N/a	—N/a	—N/a	—N/a	10
11	8	(United Kingdom) Sam Bird	McLaren-Nissan	—N/a	1:14.725	—N/a	—N/a	—N/a	11
12	23	(France) Sacha Fenestraz	Nissan	1:14.735	—N/a	—N/a	—N/a	—N/a	12
13	94	(Germany) Pascal Wehrlein	Porsche	—N/a	1:14.732	—N/a	—N/a	—N/a	13
14	1	(United Kingdom) Jake Dennis	Andretti-Porsche	1:14.771	—N/a	—N/a	—N/a	—N/a	14
15	3	(Brazil) Sérgio Sette Câmara	ERT	—N/a	1:14.771	—N/a	—N/a	—N/a	15
16	18	(India) Jehan Daruvala	Maserati	1:14.792	—N/a	—N/a	—N/a	—N/a	16
17	51	(Switzerland) Nico Müller	ABT-Mahindra	—N/a	1:14.832	—N/a	—N/a	—N/a	17
18	33	(United Kingdom) Dan Ticktum	ERT	1:14.809	—N/a	—N/a	—N/a	—N/a	18
19	11	(Brazil) Lucas di Grassi	ABT Cupra-Mahindra	—N/a	1:14.865	—N/a	—N/a	—N/a	19
20	4	(Netherlands) Robin Frijns	Envision-Jaguar	1:14.944	—N/a	—N/a	—N/a	—N/a	20
21	48	(Switzerland) Edoardo Mortara	Mahindra	—N/a	1:14.877	—N/a	—N/a	—N/a	21
22	16	(Switzerland) Sébastien Buemi	Envision-Jaguar	1:14.949	—N/a	—N/a	—N/a	—N/a	22

==== Race ====
The race took place on 26 May at 3:03 PM.

Pos.	No.	Driver	Team	Laps	Time/Retired	Grid	Points
1	13	(Portugal) António Félix da Costa	Porsche	28	36:04:600	3	25
2	5	(United Kingdom) Jake Hughes	McLaren-Nissan	28	+0.612	1	18+3^{3}
3	17	(France) Norman Nato	Andretti-Porsche	28	+1.122	7	15+1^{4}
4	37	(New Zealand) Nick Cassidy	Jaguar	28	+2.215	5	12
5	9	(New Zealand) Mitch Evans	Jaguar	28	+3.167	6	10
6	2	(Belgium) Stoffel Vandoorne	DS Penske	28	+3.861	2	8
7	25	(France) Jean-Éric Vergne	DS Penske	28	+4.374	9	6
8	7	(Germany) Maximilian Günther	Maserati	28	+5.077	10	4
9	4	(Netherlands) Robin Frijns	Envision-Jaguar	28	+7.846	20	2
10	22	(United Kingdom) Oliver Rowland	Nissan	28	+8.840	8	1
11	1	(United Kingdom) Jake Dennis	Andretti-Porsche	28	+9.634	16	
12	16	(Switzerland) Sébastien Buemi	Envision-Jaguar	28	+10.143	22	
13	48	(Switzerland) Edoardo Mortara	Mahindra	28	+11.423	21	
14	23	(France) Sacha Fenestraz	Nissan	28	+12.280	12	
15	51	(Switzerland) Nico Müller	ABT-Mahindra	28	+12.751	17	
16	21	(Netherlands) Nyck de Vries	Mahindra	28	+13.102	4	
17	18	(India) Jehan Daruvala	Maserati	28	+15.973	18	
18	3	(Brazil) Sérgio Sette Câmara	ERT	28	+16.419	15	
19	11	(Brazil) Lucas di Grassi	ABT Cupra-Mahindra	28	+50.057	19	
20	94	(Germany) Pascal Wehrlein	Porsche	28	+1:01.675	13	
21	33	(United Kingdom) Dan Ticktum	ERT	28	+1:24.415	14	
Ret	8	(United Kingdom) Sam Bird	McLaren-Nissan	18	Collision Damage	11	

Notes:

- ^3 – Pole position.
- ^4 – Fastest lap.

==== Standings after the race ====
Drivers' Championship standings

	Pos	Driver	Points
	1	(New Zealand) Nick Cassidy	167
	2	(Germany) Pascal Wehrlein	142
1	3	(New Zealand) Mitch Evans	132
1	4	(United Kingdom) Oliver Rowland	131
	5	(United Kingdom) Jake Dennis	113

Teams' Championship standings

Pos	Team	Points
1	(United Kingdom) Jaguar	299
2	(Germany) Porsche	226
3	(Japan) Nissan	157
4	(United States) DS Penske	154
5	(United States) Andretti	153

Manufacturers' Trophy standings

	Pos	Manufacturer	Points
1	1	(Germany) Porsche	337
1	2	(United Kingdom) Jaguar	328
	3	(Japan) Nissan	236
	4	(Netherlands) Stellantis	213
	5	(India) Mahindra	33

- Notes: Only the top five positions are included for all three sets of standings.

== Notes ==
Previous race: 2024 Berlin ePrix	FIA Formula E World Championship; 2023–24 season	Next race: 2024 Portland ePrix
Previous race: N/A	Shanghai ePrix	Next race: 2025 Shanghai ePrix
