= Zane Maloney =

Barbadian racing driver (born 2003)

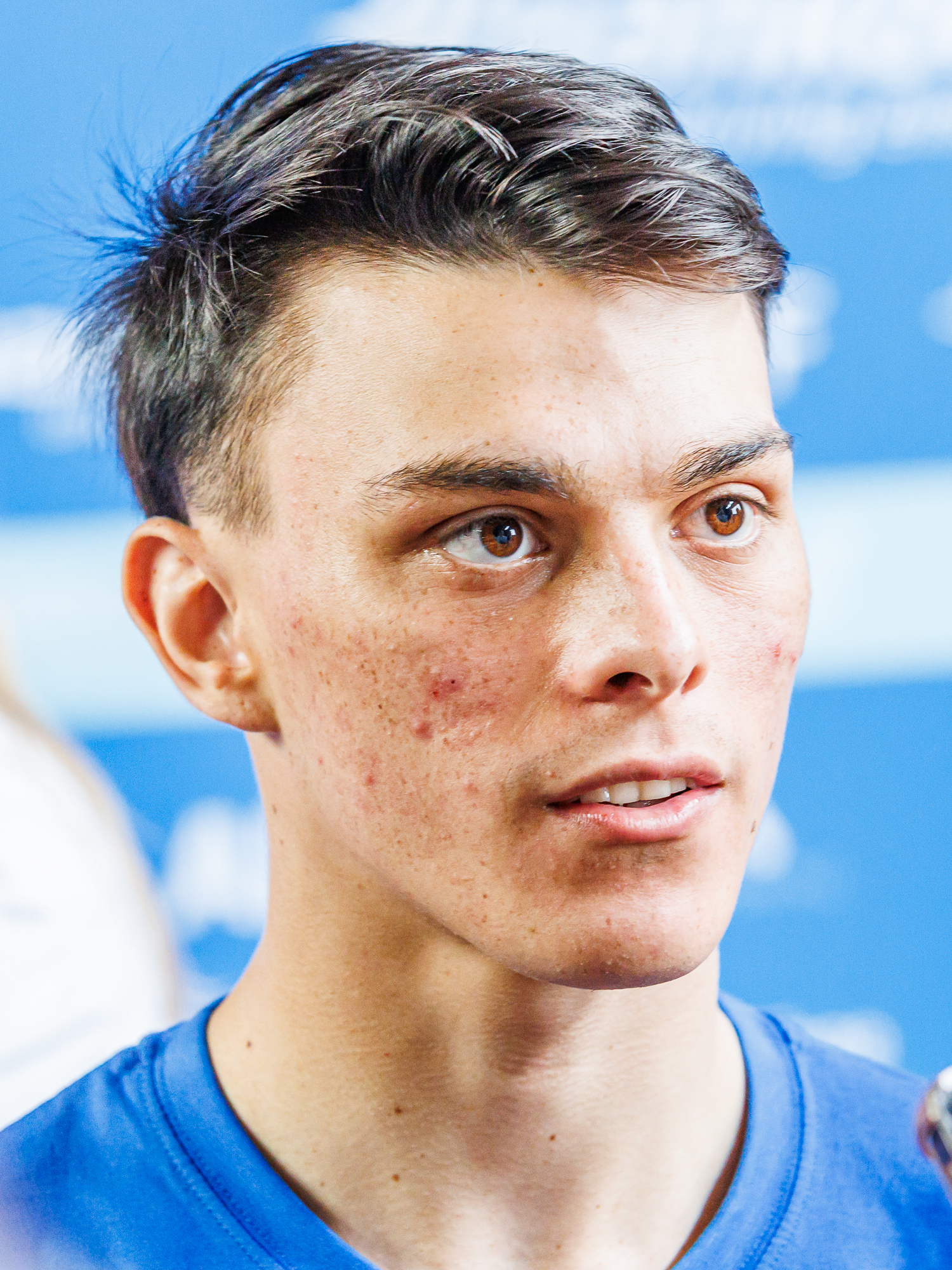
- Maloney at the 2025 Berlin ePrix
- Nationality: (Barbados) Barbadian
- Born: 2 October 2003 (age 23) Bridgetown, Barbados

Formula E career
- Debut season: 2024–25
- Current team: Nissan
- Car number: 22
- Former teams: Lola Yamaha ABT
- Starts: 33 (33 entries)
- Wins: 0
- Podiums: 0
- Poles: 0
- Fastest laps: 0
- Best finish: 20th in 2025–26

Previous series
- 2022–2024; 2022; 2021; 2020; 2019: FIA Formula 2; FIA Formula 3; FR European; Euroformula Open; F4 British

Championship titles
- 2019: F4 British Championship

Awards
- 2022: FIA Rookie of the Year

Zane Maloney (born 2 October 2003) is a Barbadian racing driver who is set to compete in Formula E for Nissan in the 2026–27 season.

Maloney previously competed in the 2024 FIA Formula 2 Championship for Rodin, having debuted for the team in the prior season. He was the 2019 British F4 champion and finished as runner-up in the 2022 FIA Formula 3 Championship, racing for Trident. He is the first Barbadian driver to win a race in FIA Formula 3 and FIA Formula 2.

Maloney was the reserve driver for Red Bull Racing and Stake F1 Team Kick Sauber in 2023 and 2024 respectively, and is a former member of the Red Bull Junior Team.

== Junior racing career ==
=== Karting ===
Maloney started racing in North America at the age of twelve, and after multiple karting titles in Barbados and America, he soon moved over to Europe to compete for Ricky Flynn Motorsport. Maloney placed fourth in the Karting European Championship, fifth in the World Championships and third in the German Championship and WSK Champions Cup respectively in 2018.

=== Formula 4 ===
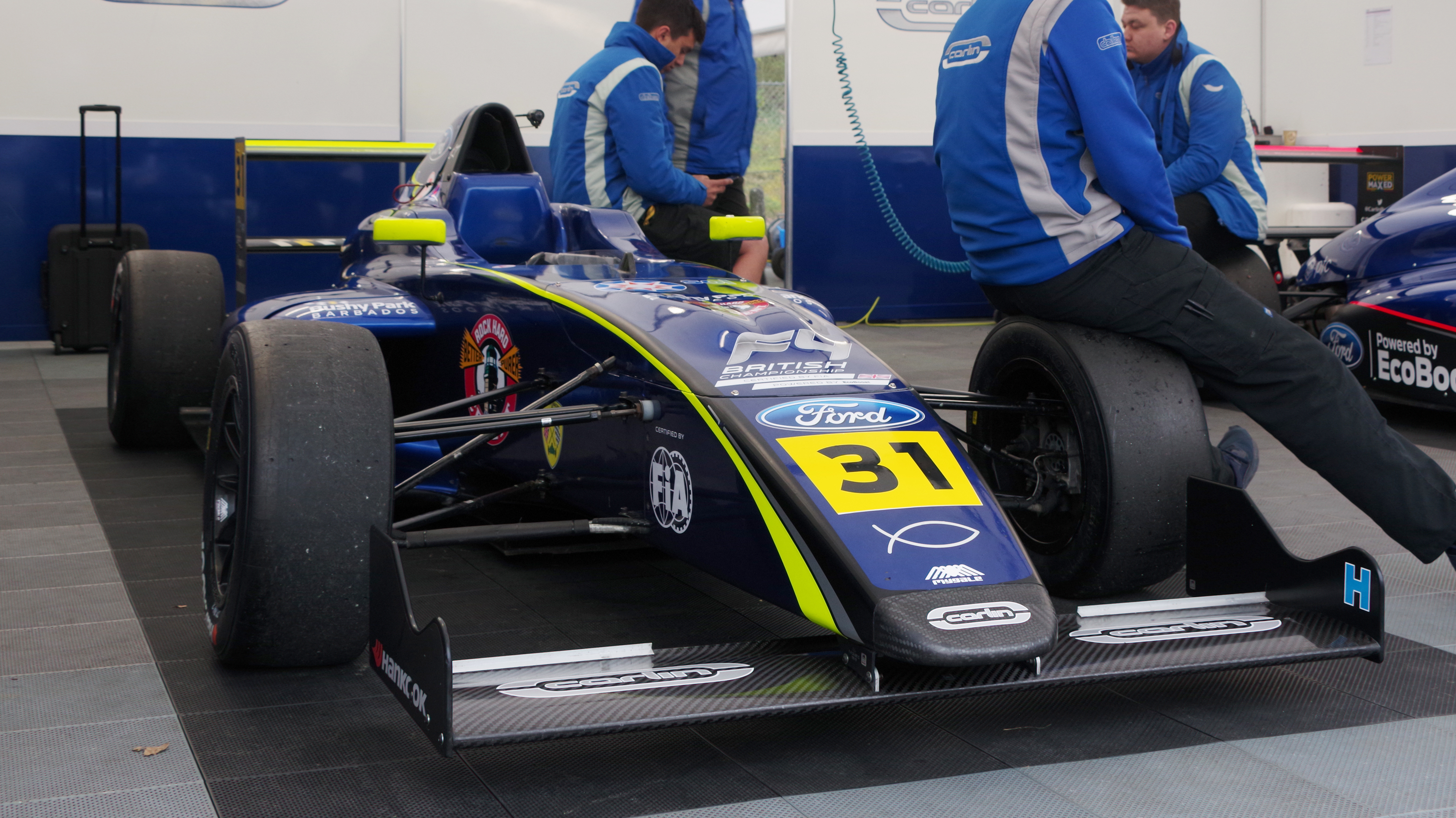
Maloney at Brands Hatch during the 2019 F4 British Championship

Maloney's first single seater season was in 2019, where he competed in British F4 for Carlin Motorsport. He began the season with a double podium in Brands Hatch, before taking his first wins in Thruxton. Another double victory followed in Croft followed, before he took a hat-trick of wins in Oulton Park, becoming the first driver since Jamie Caroline to win all three races in a single weekend. He endured a tough weekend in Snetterton where he only secured a third place finish. but returned to winning ways in Knockhill as he won the first race. At the Brands Hatch season finale, Maloney took a double victory to win the championship by 20 points over Sebastián Álvarez. Through that, he became the first Barbadian racing driver to win a championship in Europe, and the first rookie to win the championship outright in the history of the series.

=== Radical Caribbean Cup ===
Maloney contested the final two rounds of the 2019 Radical Caribbean Cup, winning all three races at Bushy Park Barbados, and two races at South Dakota in Guyana. He returned for the first round of the 2020 season, but the year did not constitute as a championship after being cancelled after round 1 due to coronavirus.

Maloney returned to the championship for the Frankie Boodram Wallerfield International Raceway round in Trinidad and Tobago in the 2022 season as a guest driver.

=== Euroformula Open Championship ===
In January 2020, Maloney reunited with Carlin to contest in the 2020 Euroformula Open. He scored his debut podium in the second race of the season at the Hungaroring, having finished fourth the day before. His next podium came the next round in Circuit Paul Ricard, but this would end up being his final podium finish of the season. After scoreless rounds in Spielberg and Spa, Maloney finished the season eighth in the drivers' standings, one position and point behind teammate Ido Cohen.

=== Formula Regional European Championship ===
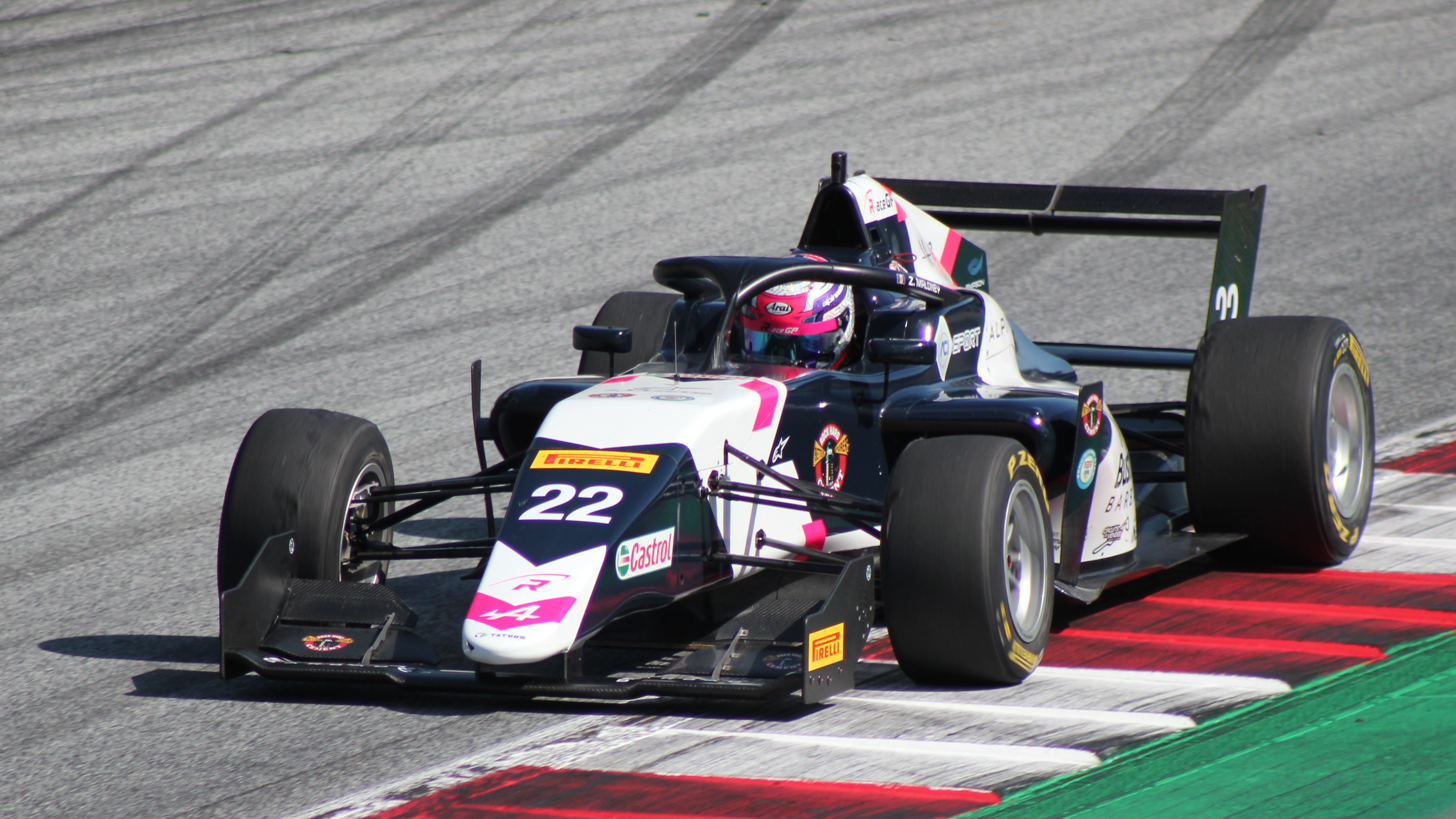
Maloney racing in the 2021 Formula Regional European Championship at the Red Bull Ring

In December 2020, Maloney was signed to R-ace GP to contest the 2021 season. His first podium came at the second race of the first round in Imola, where he finished third. Following two ninth-place finishes in Barcelona, Maloney had an impressive round in Monaco; the Bajan finished second in the first race, and then won the second race from pole position, thus becoming the first Caribbean driver to be victorious in the Principality. Maloney finished on the podium again during the next round in Paul Ricard, and secured a double podium in Spa-Francorchamps. With two further third-places at the Red Bull Ring and Monza, Maloney finished fourth in the standings, having amassed 170 points, one win and seven podiums all season.

=== FIA Formula 3 Championship ===
==== 2022 ====
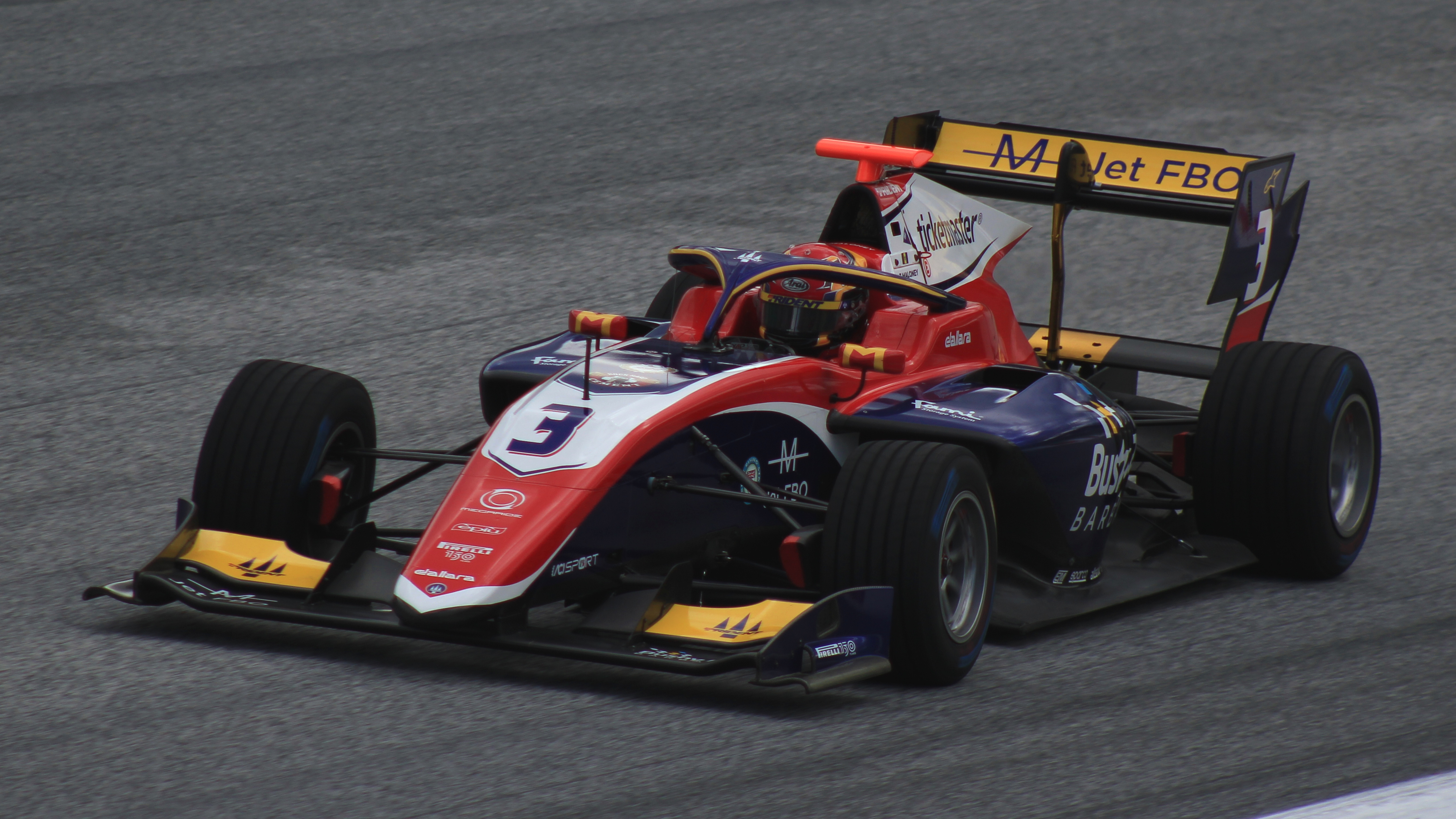
Maloney driving the Dallara F3 2019 during the 2022 Spielberg Formula 3 round

In November 2021, Maloney took part in the FIA Formula 3 post-season test, driving for reigning team champions Trident. In January the following year, the Italian outfit confirmed Maloney would race with them for the 2022 season. He had a shaky start in the Bahrain opener, finishing fourth in the sprint but an engine issue derailed his race on the opening lap. He then secured his maiden pole position in rainy conditions at Imola, despite being "annoyed at [myself]". After finishing sixth in the sprint race, a spin at the safety car restart during the feature race cost him the chance of achieving victory. In Barcelona, Maloney missed the weighbridge during qualifying, forcing him to start from the pit lane in both races. Despite making up a total of 26 positions during the races, he was forced to cope with his first non-scoring round. In Silverstone, Maloney qualified in third. He had a quiet sprint race, finishing in seventh, but his feature race derailed after he was tipped into a spin on the opening lap by Oliver Bearman, and narrowly missed out on points.

Maloney was involved in another contact with Bearman during the Austrian sprint race, this time his race ended prematurely. The next day, Maloney scored his first feature race points with fifth place. In Budapest, Maloney qualified on the front row. In mixed conditions for the feature race, Maloney was able to secure his first podium as he barely fended off Bearman for second place. He then secured another front row start in Spa-Francorchamps. He was involved in a high-speed collision with Oliver Goethe during the sprint race, which had caused the Trident driver's car to roll over, but both drivers emerged unscathed. Maloney continued with positive momentum, taking pole position for the Zandvoort round. He would proceed to take his second victory despite losing out to Victor Martins early on. This rocketed him to fifth in the standings, making him an outside chance for the title.

Maloney's qualifying form continued in the Monza finale, securing another front row start. In a chaotic sprint race, Maloney charged from 11th to fourth place. During the feature race, Maloney successfully defended against early challenges from Martins and Alexander Smolyar, and later fended off a strong attack from Bearman in a closely contested battle for the top step of the podium. Maloney ultimately emerged victorious, securing his third win. Maloney ended up second in the drivers' standings, missing out on the championship by five points to Martins. He had achieved three wins, two poles, four podiums and 134 points throughout the season. At the end of the year, Maloney received the official FIA Rookie of the Year award, having impressed many with his late run of form during his Formula 3 campaign.

==== 2023 ====
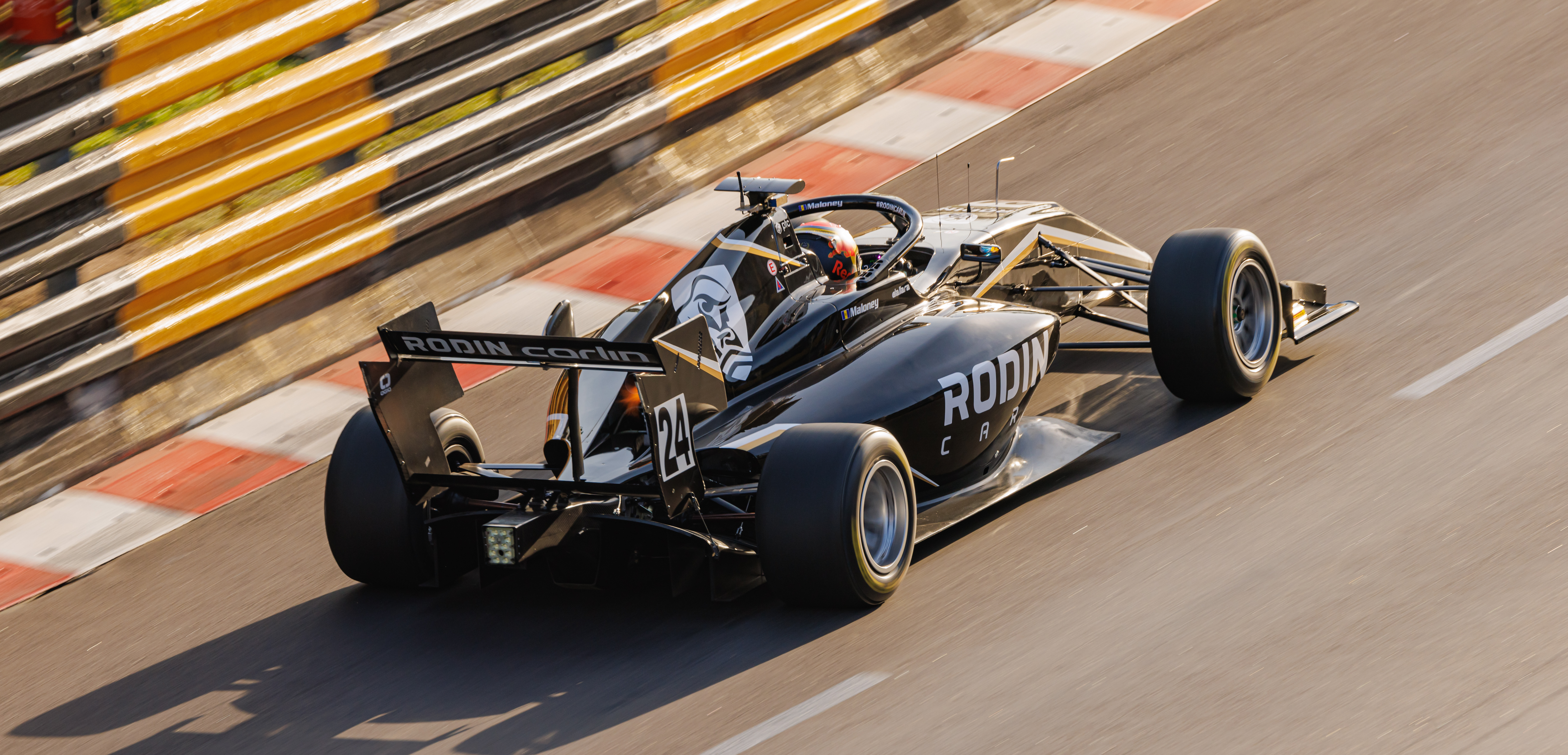
Maloney at the 2023 Macau Grand Prix with Rodin Carlin

In 2023, Maloney returned to Formula 3 to drive for Rodin Carlin in the Jerez F3 post-season test. He also participated in the Macau Grand Prix for the team. He finished the main race in eighth place.

=== FIA Formula 2 Championship ===
==== 2022 ====
Following Calan Williams' departure from the team, Maloney was called up to replace him at Trident for the Yas Marina season finale. After an uneventful weekend, Maloney was invited to test for Carlin at the end of season F2 test.

==== 2023 ====
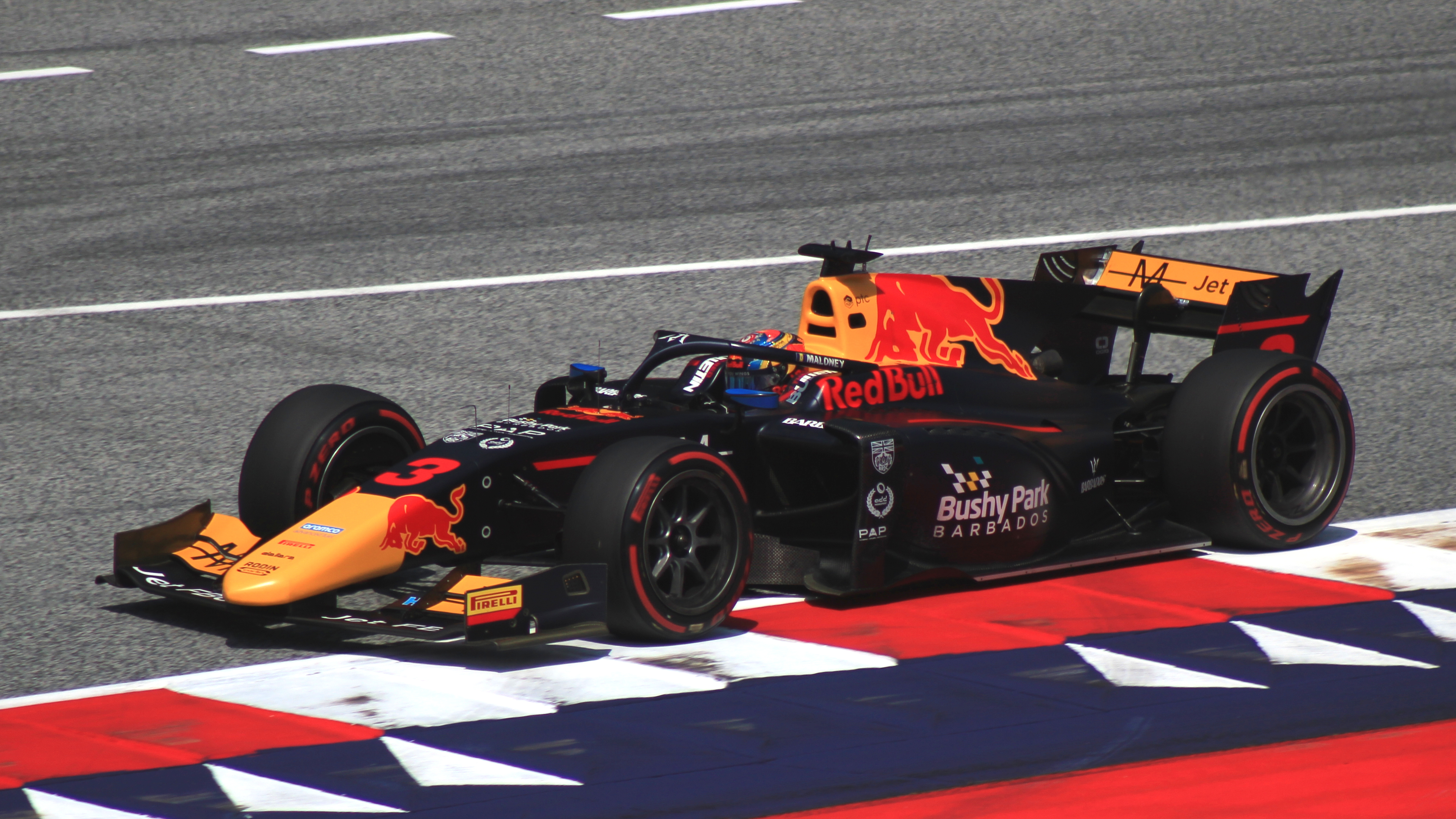
Maloney driving the Dallara F2 2018 during the 2023 Spielberg Formula 2 round

On 18 January 2023, Maloney was announced as a part of the team line-up for Rodin Carlin for 2023 season, alongside Brazilian driver and fellow Red Bull Junior Enzo Fittipaldi. Maloney qualified a poor 18th in the Bahrain opening round, but narrowly missed points in ninth during the sprint. A sprinting feature race charge followed, benefitting from lap 1 chaos and fresher tyres to claim third place and his first F2 podium. Following the race, Maloney stated that "the engine shut off" mid-race momentarily. Maloney had a dreadful weekend in Jeddah, he spun out in the sprint race and lacked pace in the feature race, ending without points. The Barbadian driver bounced back in Melbourne by qualifying fifth, and ended all the races in the same position. Despite securing ninth in Baku qualifying, he would have a forgettable weekend, colliding with Victor Martins at the start in the sprint and a lack of pace in the feature race meant he would come away without points.

In Monaco, Maloney qualified in fifth, and ended the sprint race in the same position. A crash for Jack Doohan and a late drive-through penalty for Martins ahead would see him third and collecting a second podium. He then went two rounds without scoring points. Maloney then qualified fourth in Silverstone, but received two separate three-place grid penalties for the sprint due to impeding. In the feature race, he remained out of trouble and made his way to second place, securing his best result up to that point. In the Spa-Francorchamps feature race, Maloney returned to the points with fourth place, having been embroiled in a tight fight with teammate Fittipaldi. Starting fourth for the Zandvoort feature race, Maloney moved up to third early on, and later passed Jak Crawford on the safety car restart to take second place and another podium.

During the Monza feature race, Maloney was involved in a major crash on lap 12 when Roy Nissany crashed into the back of him, causing Maloney to spin across the pit straight and hit the wall three times. Fortunately, Maloney emerged unscathed from the incident. He then matched his best qualifying result with fourth in the Abu Dhabi finale. During the feature race, he overcame Ayumu Iwasa and ran in third place, but collided with a hard charging Frederik Vesti on the last lap, causing Maloney to tumble out of the points. Maloney ended his season tenth in the drivers' standings with 96 points and four podiums, 28 behind teammate Fittipaldi.

==== 2024 ====
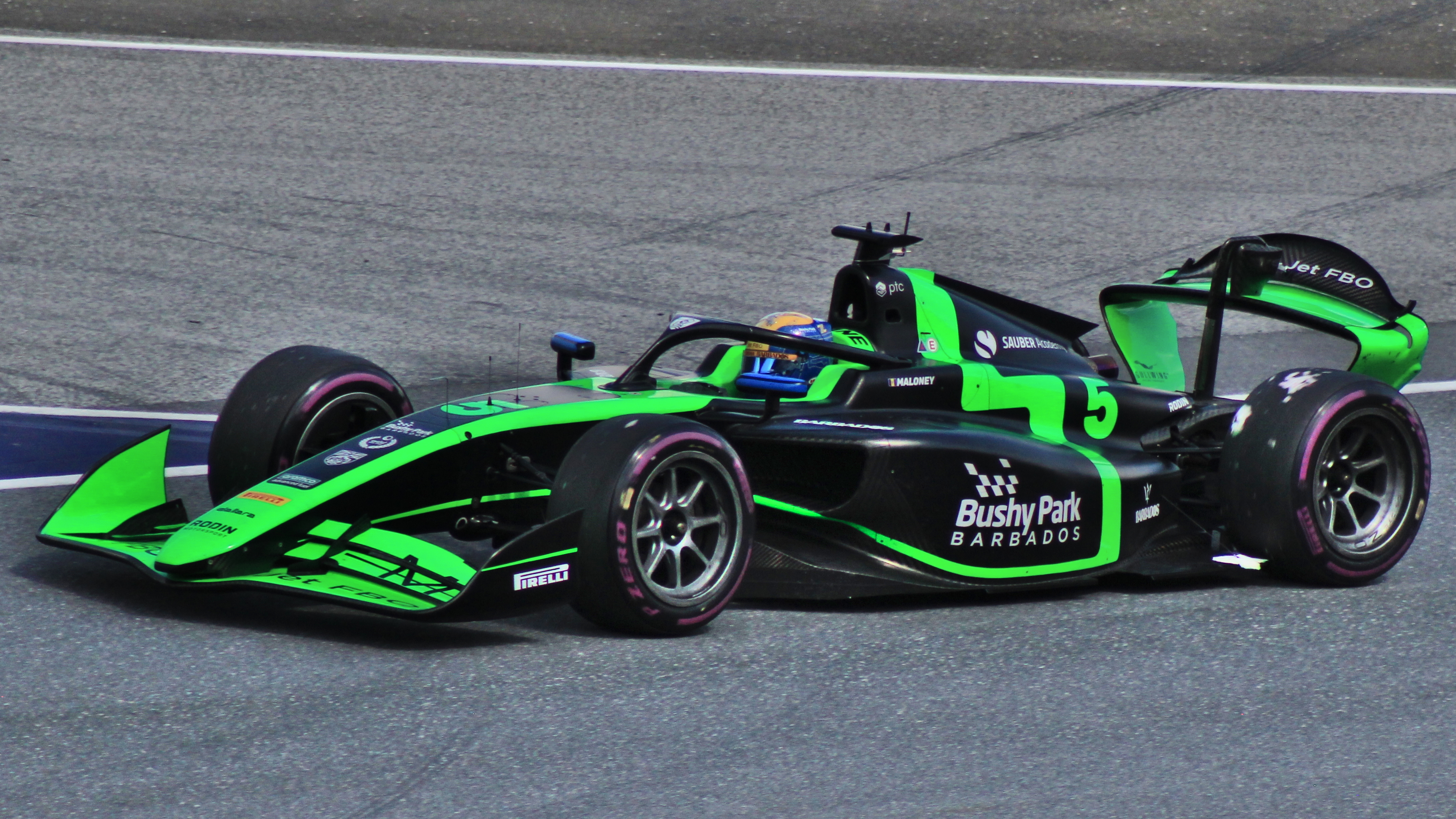
Maloney driving for Rodin Motorsport during the 2024 Spielberg Formula 2 round

Maloney remained with Rodin Carlin, now Rodin Motorsport, for the 2024 season and his teammate was 2023 Super Formula champion Ritomo Miyata. Maloney started the season by qualifying third. From eighth in the sprint, Maloney slowly creeped up the order and passed Jak Crawford for the lead on lap 8. He would then proceed to pull ahead and take his maiden F2 win. In the feature race, Maloney took the lead into the first corner after polesitter Gabriel Bortoleto and Isack Hadjar collided. From there, Maloney controlled proceedings and was able to win his second consecutive race, making him the first driver since Oliver Bearman to win both races on the same weekend. A poor qualifying in Jeddah followed with 16th, but stunned in an impressive recovery drive to fourth place in the sprint race. He improved in the feature race, as he finished in seventh place. He qualified fifth in Melbourne, but endured a scrappy sprint race, a costly mistake into the gravel mid-race dropped him out of the points; he eventually placed tenth. A clean feature race followed the next day, as Maloney powered through to third place. At that point, Maloney led the standings by 14 points, praising his mindset change a reason for his improved form.

Maloney secured another third-placed podium during the Imola sprint race, where he passed Amaury Cordeel for third with three laps to go. He had a forgettable feature race, as he was stuck behind Roman Staněk following the pit stops, causing Maloney to eventually finish in 11th place. A bruising weekend followed in Monaco, he retired in the sprint after contact with Zak O'Sullivan caused Maloney to spin, whereas in the feature race, he clashed with Joshua Dürksen in the dying laps but was lucky to rescue a point. Despite starting 17th for the Barcelona feature race, Maloney made his way up the order, eventually crossing the line seventh at the chequered flag. His first non-scoring round came next in Austria, where Maloney qualified down in 20th and retired from the feature race with an engine issue on lap 7. However, Maloney managed to turn his fortunes around in Silverstone, as he returned to the podium in second place in mixed conditions during the sprint race. The next day, from ninth, Maloney fought for the win with Isack Hadjar after the pit stops, where he would secure back-to-back second places.

Maloney had another weekend of missed opportunities in Hungary; he stalled from third on the formation of the sprint race while his feature race was curtailed early after being hit from Paul Aron behind. He had a clean weekend in Spa-Francorchamps, securing fourth and sixth place in the races. In Monza, Maloney took his maiden F2 pole position. He had a strong fightback in the sprint, passing former teammate Enzo Fittipaldi on the last lap for fifth place. An unlucky safety car timing during the feature race saw Gabriel Bortoleto jump him in the pit stops, and Maloney was forced to cope with second place again, but still moved back into the top-three of the standings. Despite qualifying fourth Baku, Maloney had another unfortunate weekend, being pushed down to tenth during battles in the sprint, while chances of big points faded as Maloney spun after making contact with Andrea Kimi Antonelli on his outlap. During the Qatar round, Maloney signed off Formula 2 with sixth and ninth place, despite the latter feature race being compromised by a spin.

Maloney would not contest the Abu Dhabi season finale after signing as a Formula E driver for ABT Yamaha Lola, and was replaced by 2024 FIA Formula 3 champion Leonardo Fornaroli. Maloney concluded his season fourth in the drivers' standings, scoring two wins, one pole, seven podiums and 140 points.

=== Formula One ===
In December 2022, Maloney joined the Red Bull Junior Team and was Red Bull Racing's reserve driver in 2023. In January 2024, Maloney joined the Sauber Academy and served as a reserve driver for Stake F1 Team Kick Sauber in the 2024 Formula One World Championship. Later in December that year, Maloney announced his departure from Sauber after becoming a full-time Formula E driver.

== Formula E career ==
In April 2023, Maloney was invited to take part in the Formula E rookie test at the Tempelhof Airport Street Circuit with Andretti Autosport. He took part in his first Formula E practice session at the Rome ePrix. Later that November, he was announced to be the reserve and development driver for Andretti for the 2023–24 season. He would run for Andretti during the rookie free practice session at Misano and the rookie test in Berlin.

=== Lola Yamaha ABT (2024–2026) ===
==== 2024–25: Rookie season ====
On 25 September 2024, Maloney announced that he would switch from Formula 2 to compete in the 2024–25 Formula E World Championship with ABT Yamaha Lola, partnering 2016–17 Formula E champion Lucas di Grassi. Maloney was the only driver not to score points all season, with a best finish of eleventh at the Shanghai ePrix—teammate Di Grassi finished seventeenth with one podium and 32 points.

==== 2025–26 season ====
Maloney retained his seat at Lola Yamaha ABT alongside Lucas di Grassi for the 2025–26 season.

=== Nissan (2027–) ===
==== 2026–27 season ====
Maloney switched to Nissan for the 2026–27 season, partnering 2024–25 champion Oliver Rowland.

== Other racing ==
On 1 August 2024, Maloney took part in his maiden IndyCar test with Rahal Letterman Lanigan Racing at the Indianapolis Motor Speedway.

== Personal life ==
Maloney was born on 2 October 2003 in Bridgetown, Barbados to Natalie and Sean Maloney. His father, as well as his two uncles, were racing drivers in Barbados. His uncle, Mark Maloney, is a property developer and chairman of Bushy Park Circuit. Raised in Christ Church, Maloney started karting at the age of three and was an avid fan of formula racing and rallying during his youth. He idolised Lewis Hamilton and attended his first Formula One race win at the 2007 Canadian Grand Prix with his father. After competing in karting, Maloney moved to Farnham, England.

== Karting record ==
=== Karting career summary ===
Season	Series	Team	Position
2016	Trofeo delle Industrie — OKJ		29th
2016	SKUSA SuperNationals — Mini Swift	Kartsport North America	13th
2017	South Garda Winter Cup — OKJ	Ricky Flynn Motorsport	16th
2017	Trofeo delle Industrie — OKJ	Ricky Flynn Motorsport	8th
2017	WSK Super Master Series — OKJ	Ricky Flynn Motorsport	8th
2017	CIK-FIA European Championship — OKJ	Ricky Flynn Motorsport	13th
2017	CIK-FIA World Championship — OKJ	Ricky Flynn Motorsport	5th
2017	WSK Final Cup — OKJ	Ricky Flynn Motorsport	7th
2017	SKUSA SuperNationals — X30 Junior	Speed Concepts Racing	11th
2018	WSK Champions Cup — OK	Ricky Flynn Motorsport	**3rd**
2018	WSK Super Master Series — OK	Ricky Flynn Motorsport	8th
2018	South Garda Winter Cup — OK	Ricky Flynn Motorsport	20th
2018	German Karting Championship — Senior	Ricky Flynn Motorsport	4th
2018	WSK Open Cup — OK	Ricky Flynn Motorsport	12th
2018	CIK-FIA European Championship — OK	Ricky Flynn Motorsport	4th
2018	CIK-FIA World Championship — OK	Ricky Flynn Motorsport	80th
2018	WSK Final Cup — OK	Ricky Flynn Motorsport	19th
2018	SKUSA SuperNationals — X30 Senior	KartSport North America	**2nd**

=== Complete CIK-FIA Karting European Championship results ===
(key) (Races in bold indicate pole position) (Races in italics indicate fastest lap)

Year	Team	Class	1	2	3	4	5	6	7	8	9	10	DC	Points
2017	Ricky Flynn Motorsport	OKJ	SAR; QH; 19	SAR; R 30	CAY; QH; 3	CAY; R 4	LEM; QH; 10	LEM; R 29	ALA; QH; 13	ALA; R 7	KRI; QH; 56	KRI; R DNQ	13th	31
2018	Ricky Flynn Motorsport	OK	SAR; QH; 5	SAR; R 11	PFI; QH (7)	PFI; R 29	AMP; QH; 4	AMP; R 3	ALB; QH; 4	ALB; R 5			4th	52

=== Complete Karting World Championship results ===
Year	Team	Car	Quali Heats	Main race
2017	(United Kingdom) Ricky Flynn Motorsport	OKJ	4th	**5th**
2018	(United Kingdom) Ricky Flynn Motorsport	OK	80th	**DNQ**

== Racing record ==
=== Racing career summary ===
Season	Series	Team	Races	Wins	Poles	F/Laps	Podiums	Points	Position
2019	F4 British Championship	Carlin	30	10	6	5	15	427	**1st**
2019	Radical Caribbean Cup	N/A	6	5	2	5	5	?	5th
2020	Euroformula Open Championship	Carlin	17	0	0	0	2	113	8th
2021	Formula Regional European Championship	R-ace GP	20	1	1	1	7	170	4th
2022	FIA Formula 3 Championship	Trident	18	3	2	3	4	134	**2nd**
2022	FIA Formula 2 Championship	Trident	2	0	0	0	0	0	26th
2022	Radical Caribbean Cup	N/A	3	2	1	3	2	N/A	NC†
2022–23	Formula E	Avalanche Andretti Formula E	Test driver						
2023	FIA Formula 2 Championship	Rodin Carlin	26	0	0	1	4	96	10th
2023	Macau Grand Prix	Rodin Carlin	1	0	0	0	0	N/A	8th
2023	Formula One	Oracle Red Bull Racing	Reserve driver						
2023–24	Formula E	Andretti Formula E	Reserve driver						
2024	FIA Formula 2 Championship	Rodin Motorsport	26	2	1	1	7	140	4th
2024	Formula One	Stake F1 Team Kick Sauber	Reserve driver						
2024–25	Formula E	Lola Yamaha ABT Formula E Team	16	0	0	0	0	0	24th
2025–26	Formula E	Lola Yamaha ABT Formula E Team	17	0	0	0	0	3	20th
2026–27	Formula E	Nissan Formula E Team	0	0	0	0	0	0	TBD

^{†} As Maloney was a guest driver, he was ineligible to score points.
* Season still in progress.

=== Complete F4 British Championship results ===
(key) (Races in bold indicate pole position) (Races in italics indicate fastest lap)

Year	Team	1	2	3	4	5	6	7	8	9	10	11	12	13	14	15	16	17	18	19	20	21	22	23	24	25	26	27	28	29	30	Pos	Points
2019	Carlin	BRI; 1; 3	BRI; 2; 7	BRI; 3; 2	DON; 1; 8	DON; 2; 6	DON; 3; 6	THR1; 1; 2	THR1; 2; 1	THR1; 3; 1	**CRO**; **1**; 1	CRO; 2; 5	**CRO**; **3**; 1	**OUL**; **1**; 1	OUL; 2; 1	**OUL**; **3**; 1	SNE; 1; 3	SNE; 2 Ret	SNE; 3; 4	THR2; 1; 6	THR2; 2; 5	THR2; 3; 6	**KNO**; **1**; 1	KNO; 2; 8	**KNO**; **3** NC	SIL; 1; 5	SIL; 2; 2	SIL; 3 Ret	BHGP; 1; 1	BHGP; 2; 5	BHGP; 3; 1	1st	427

=== Complete Euroformula Open Championship results ===
(key) (Races in bold indicate pole position) (Races in italics indicate fastest lap)

Year	Team	1	2	3	4	5	6	7	8	9	10	11	12	13	14	15	16	17	18	Pos	Points
2020	Carlin Motorsport	HUN; 1; 4	HUN; 2; 3	LEC; 1 DNS	LEC; 2; 2	RBR; 1; 12	RBR; 2 Ret	MNZ; 1; 8	MNZ; 2; 4	MNZ; 3; 7	MUG; 1; 8	MUG; 2; 5	SPA; 1; 14	SPA; 2 Ret	SPA; 3; 12	CAT; 1; 4	CAT; 2; 9	CAT; 3; 6	CAT; 4; 5	8th	113

=== Complete Formula Regional European Championship results ===
(key) (Races in bold indicate pole position) (Races in italics indicate fastest lap)

Year	Team	1	2	3	4	5	6	7	8	9	10	11	12	13	14	15	16	17	18	19	20	DC	Points
2021	R-ace GP	IMO; 1 Ret	IMO; 2; 3	CAT; 1; 9	CAT; 2; 9	MCO; 1; 2	**MCO**; **2**; 1	LEC; 1; 4	LEC; 2; 6	ZAN; 1; 15	ZAN; 2; 8	SPA; 1; 3	SPA; 2; 2	RBR; 1; 9	RBR; 2; 3	VAL; 1; 8	VAL; 2; 8	MUG; 1; 11	MUG; 2; 14	MNZ; 1; 3	MNZ; 2; 7	4th	170

=== Complete FIA Formula 3 Championship results ===
(key) (Races in bold indicate pole position) (Races in italics indicate points for the fastest lap of top ten finishers)

Year	Entrant	1	2	3	4	5	6	7	8	9	10	11	12	13	14	15	16	17	18	DC	Points
2022	Trident	BHR; SPR; 4	BHR; FEA; Ret	IMO; SPR; 6	**IMO**; **FEA**; Ret	CAT; SPR; 21	CAT; FEA; 13	SIL; SPR; 7	SIL; FEA; 11	RBR; SPR; Ret	RBR; FEA; 5	HUN; SPR; 10	HUN; FEA; 2	SPA; SPR; Ret	SPA; FEA; 1	ZAN; SPR; 17	**ZAN**; **FEA**; 1	MNZ; SPR; 4	MNZ; FEA; 1	2nd	134

=== Complete Macau Grand Prix results ===
Year	Team	Car	Qualifying	Quali Race	Main race
2023	(United Kingdom) Rodin Carlin	Dallara F3 2019	16th	10th	8th

=== Complete FIA Formula 2 Championship results ===
(key) (Races in bold indicate pole position) (Races in italics indicate points for the fastest lap of top ten finishers)

Year	Entrant	1	2	3	4	5	6	7	8	9	10	11	12	13	14	15	16	17	18	19	20	21	22	23	24	25	26	27	28	DC	Points
2022	Trident	BHR; SPR	BHR; FEA	JED; SPR	JED; FEA	IMO; SPR	IMO; FEA	CAT; SPR	CAT; FEA	MCO; SPR	MCO; FEA	BAK; SPR	BAK; FEA	SIL; SPR	SIL; FEA	RBR; SPR	RBR; FEA	LEC; SPR	LEC; FEA	HUN; SPR	HUN; FEA	SPA; SPR	SPA; FEA	ZAN; SPR	ZAN; FEA	MNZ; SPR	MNZ; FEA	YMC; SPR; 15	YMC; FEA; 16	26th	0
2023	Rodin Carlin	BHR; SPR; 9	BHR; FEA; 3	JED; SPR; Ret	JED; FEA; 17	MEL; SPR; 5	MEL; FEA; 5	BAK; SPR; Ret	BAK; FEA; 11	MCO; SPR; 5	MCO; FEA; 3	CAT; SPR; 14	CAT; FEA; 16	RBR; SPR; 18	RBR; FEA; 15	SIL; SPR; 10	SIL; FEA; 2	HUN; SPR; 12	HUN; FEA; 16	SPA; SPR; 10	SPA; FEA; 4	ZAN; SPR; 5	ZAN; FEA; 2	MNZ; SPR; 14	MNZ; FEA; Ret	YMC; SPR; 9	YMC; FEA; 17†			10th	96
2024	Rodin Motorsport	BHR; SPR; 1	BHR; FEA; 1	JED; SPR; 4	JED; FEA; 7	MEL; SPR; 10	MEL; FEA; 3	IMO; SPR; 3	IMO; FEA; 11	MON; SPR; Ret	MON; FEA; 10	CAT; SPR; 20	CAT; FEA; 7	RBR; SPR; 17	RBR; FEA; Ret	SIL; SPR; 2	SIL; FEA; 2	HUN; SPR; 13	HUN; FEA; Ret	SPA; SPR; 4	SPA; FEA; 6	MNZ; SPR; 5	**MNZ**; **FEA**; 2	BAK; SPR; 10	BAK; FEA; 15	LSL; SPR; 6	LSL; FEA; 9	YMC; SPR	YMC; FEA	4th	140

=== Complete Formula E results ===
(key) (Races in bold indicate pole position; races in italics indicate fastest lap)

Year	Team	Chassis	Powertrain	1	2	3	4	5	6	7	8	9	10	11	12	13	14	15	16	17	Pos	Points
2024–25	Lola Yamaha ABT Formula E Team	Formula E Gen3 Evo	Lola-Yamaha T001	SAO; 12	MEX; 15	JED; 16	JED; 18	MIA; 19	MCO; 21	MCO; 14	TKO; 16	TKO; 14	SHA; 19	SHA; 11	JKT; 18	BER; 16	BER; Ret	LDN; Ret	LDN; 16		24th	0
2025–26	Lola Yamaha ABT Formula E Team	Formula E Gen3 Evo	Lola-Yamaha T001	SAO; 10	MEX; 16	MIA; 11	JED; Ret	JED; 18	MAD; 20	BER; 15	BER; 17	MCO; 13	MCO; 10	SAN; 11	SHA; 11	SHA; Ret	TKO; 19	TKO; 10	LDN; Ret	LDN; 17	20th	3

^{*} Season still in progress.

Sporting positions
Preceded by Kiern Jewiss	F4 British Championship; Champion; 2019	Succeeded by Luke Browning
Preceded by Jack Doohan	F4 British Championship; Rookie Cup; 2019	Succeeded by Christian Mansell
Awards and achievements
Preceded by Oscar Piastri	FIA Rookie of the Year; 2022	Succeeded by Oscar Piastri
