= Shanghai ePrix =

Formula E motor race in China

- Shanghai International Circuit
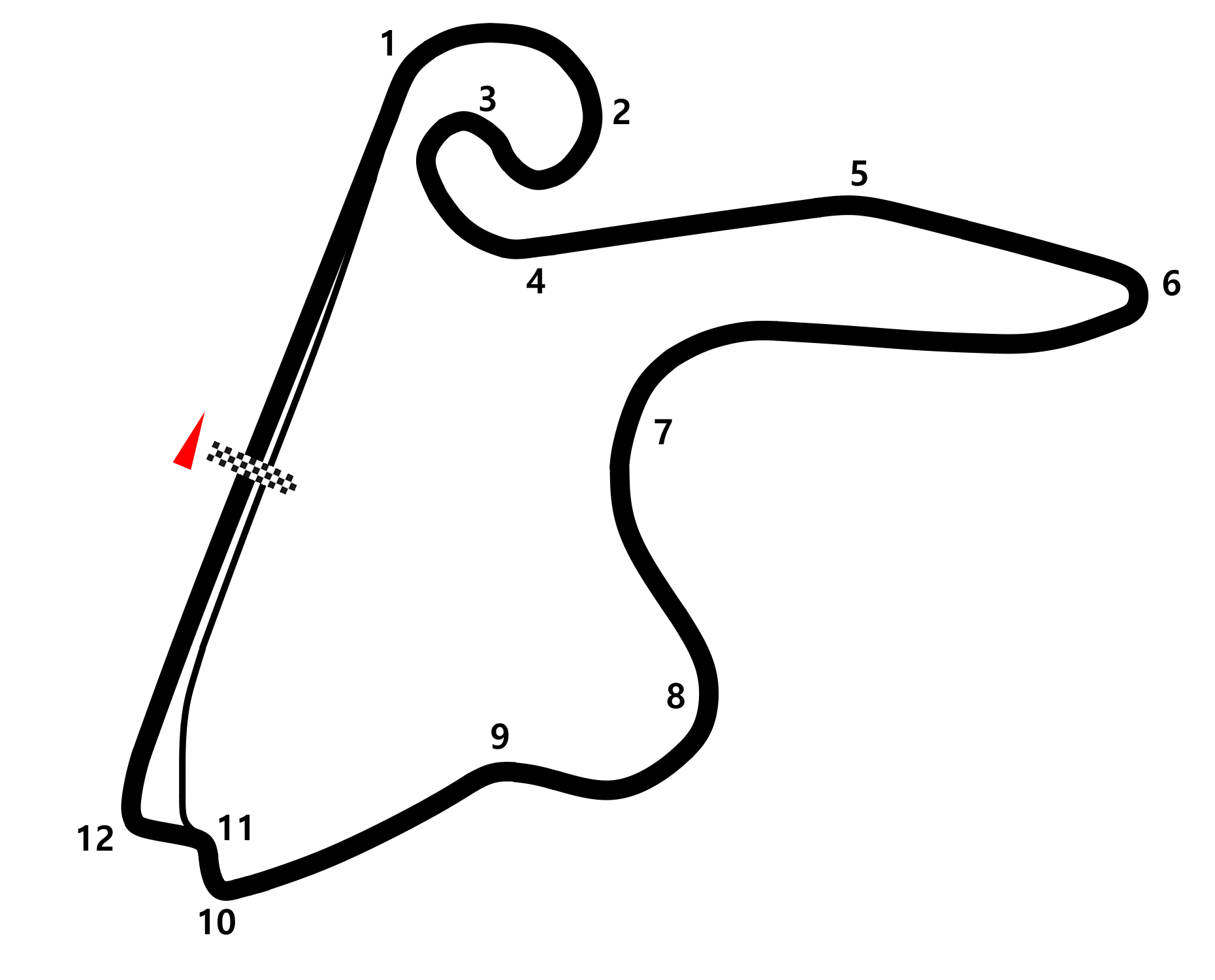

Race information
- Number of times held: 3
- First held: 2024
- Most wins (constructors): Jaguar; Porsche (both 2)
- Circuit length: 3.051 km (1.896 miles)

Last race (2026)

Pole position
- (Brazil) Felipe Drugovich; Andretti; 1:10.609

Podium
- 1. (Brazil) Lucas di Grassi; Lola Yamaha ABT; 40:43.390; 2. (France) Jean-Éric Vergne; Citroën; +0.565; 3. (Sweden) Joel Eriksson; Envision; +2.903

Fastest lap
- (United Kingdom) Oliver Rowland; Nissan; 1:10.945

The Shanghai E-Prix is an annual race in the FIA Formula E World Championship, an all-electric single-seater racing series. The race was held for the first time at the Shanghai International Circuit on 25 May 2024.

== History ==
Formula E has raced in China multiple times, with the Beijing ePrix serving as the opening race for the seasons 1 and 2, the Hong Kong ePrix serving as the opening race for the seasons 3 and 4 and held for the final time in 2019, and the Sanya ePrix being held in 2019. There was supposed to be a race in Sanya in 2020, but this was cancelled due to the COVID-19 pandemic.

The Shanghai ePrix was announced as part of the calendar for the 2023-24 season on 19 October 2023. It would be held as a double header, with the second race substituting for the Jakarta ePrix, which was cancelled due to the upcoming presidential election.

== Circuit ==
The race is being held on the Shanghai International Circuit, the same venue that hosts Formula One's Chinese Grand Prix. The track layout has been altered to remove the long back straight, instead cutting across from Turn 9 to the pit straight with a chicane beforehand.

== Results ==
Edition	Track	Winner	Second	Third	Pole position	Fastest lap	Ref
2024 Race 1	Shanghai International Circuit	(New Zealand) Mitch Evans; Jaguar TCS Racing	(Germany) Pascal Wehrlein; TAG Heuer Porsche Formula E Team	(New Zealand) Nick Cassidy; Jaguar TCS Racing	(France) Jean-Éric Vergne; DS Penske	(United Kingdom) Jake Dennis; Andretti Formula E Team	
2024 Race 2	Shanghai International Circuit	(Portugal) António Félix da Costa; TAG Heuer Porsche Formula E Team	(United Kingdom) Jake Hughes; NEOM McLaren Formula E Team	(France) Norman Nato; Andretti Formula E Team	(United Kingdom) Jake Hughes; NEOM McLaren Formula E Team	(France) Norman Nato; Andretti Formula E Team	
2025 Race 1	Shanghai International Circuit	(Germany) Maximilian Günther; DS Penske	(France) Jean-Éric Vergne; DS Penske	(United Kingdom) Taylor Barnard; NEOM McLaren Formula E Team	(Germany) Maximilian Günther; DS Penske	(New Zealand) Nick Cassidy; Jaguar TCS Racing	
2025 Race 2	Shanghai International Circuit	(New Zealand) Nick Cassidy; Jaguar TCS Racing	(Germany) Pascal Wehrlein; TAG Heuer Porsche Formula E Team	(Portugal) António Félix da Costa; TAG Heuer Porsche Formula E Team	(New Zealand) Nick Cassidy; Jaguar TCS Racing	(Germany) Pascal Wehrlein; TAG Heuer Porsche Formula E Team	
2026 Race 1	Shanghai International Circuit	(Germany) Pascal Wehrlein; Porsche Formula E Team	(Portugal) António Félix da Costa; Jaguar TCS Racing	(United Kingdom) Jake Dennis; Andretti Formula E	(Germany) Pascal Wehrlein; Porsche Formula E Team	(Switzerland) Edoardo Mortara; Mahindra Racing	
2026 Race 2	Shanghai International Circuit	(Brazil) Lucas di Grassi; Lola Yamaha ABT Formula E Team	(France) Jean-Éric Vergne; Citroën Racing	(Sweden) Joel Eriksson; Envision Racing	(Brazil) Felipe Drugovich; Andretti Formula E	(United Kingdom) Oliver Rowland; Nissan Formula E Team	
