= 2025 Shanghai ePrix =

Race 10 of 16 of the 2024–25 Formula E season
← Previous race	Next race →
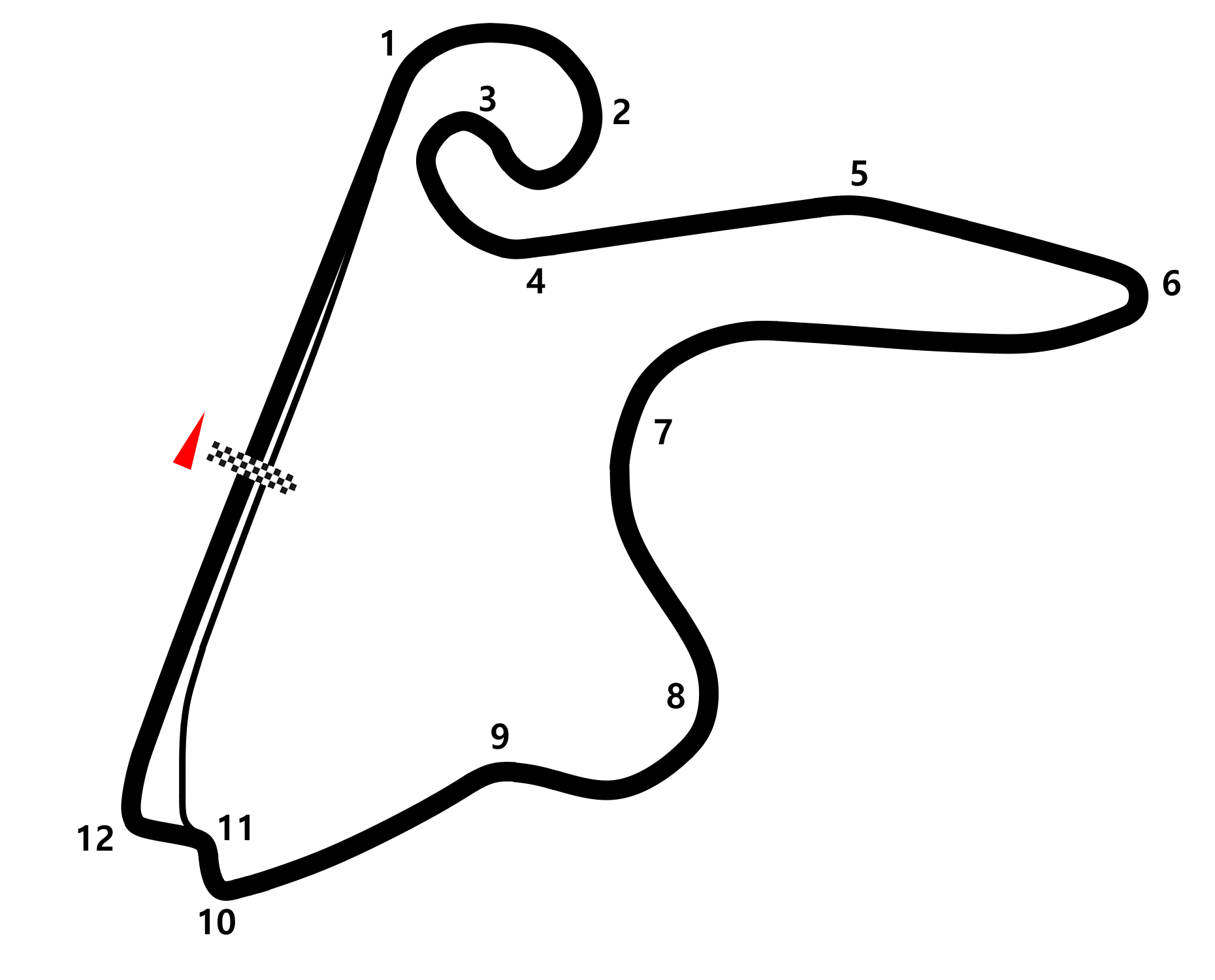

Race details
- Date: 31 May 2025
- Official name: 2025 Hankook Shanghai E-Prix
- Location: Shanghai International Circuit, Shanghai
- Course: Permanent racing facility
- Course length: 3.051 km (1.896 mi)
- Distance: 29 laps, 88.479 km (54.978 mi)

Pole position
Driver	(Germany) Maximilian Günther	DS Penske
- Time: 1:08.234

Fastest lap
Driver	(New Zealand) Nick Cassidy	Jaguar Racing
- Time: 1:10.564

Podium
First	(Germany) Maximilian Günther	DS Penske
Second	(France) Jean-Éric Vergne	DS Penske
Third	(United Kingdom) Taylor Barnard	McLaren

2025 Shanghai ePrix
Race 11 of 16 of the 2024–25 Formula E season
← Previous race	Next race →
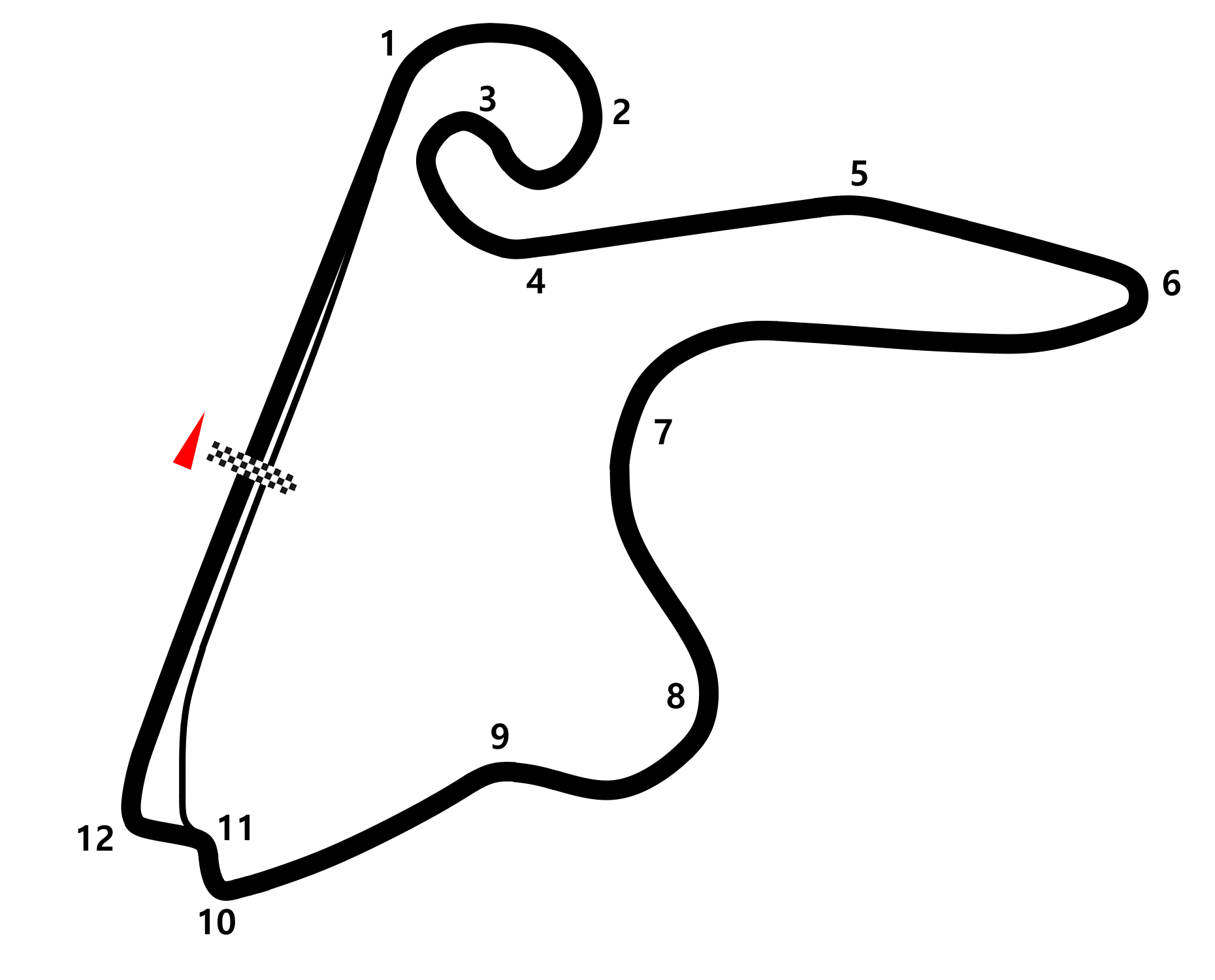

Race details
- Date: 1 June 2025
- Official name: 2025 Hankook Shanghai E-Prix
- Location: Shanghai International Circuit, Shanghai
- Course: Permanent racing facility
- Course length: 3.051 km (1.896 mi)
- Distance: 31 laps, 94.581 km (58.770 mi)
- Scheduled distance: 28 laps, 85.428 km (53.082 mi)
- Weather: Rainy

Pole position
Driver	(New Zealand) Nick Cassidy	Jaguar
- Time: 1:31.305

Fastest lap
Driver	(Germany) Pascal Wehrlein	Porsche
- Time: 1:23.433

Podium
First	(New Zealand) Nick Cassidy	Jaguar
Second	(Germany) Pascal Wehrlein	Porsche
Third	(Portugal) António Félix da Costa	Porsche

The 2025 Shanghai ePrix, known for sponsorship reasons as the 2025 Hankook Shanghai ePrix was a pair of Formula E electric car races held at the Shanghai International Circuit in the outskirts of Shanghai, China on 31 May and 1 June 2025. It served as the 10th and 11th rounds of the 2024–25 Formula E season, and marked the second edition of the Shanghai ePrix.

== Background ==
Oliver Rowland entered the race as the leader in the Drivers' Championship with a 77 point lead over defending champion Pascal Wehrlein, followed by António Félix da Costa (98 points behind).

Prior to the race, Nissan held a 15 point lead over Porsche in the Teams' Championship, with Mahindra Racing in third. In the Manufacturers' Trophy, Nissan held a 44 point lead over Porsche, with Stellantis in third.

The first race of the doubleheader weekend featured the use of Pit Boost, which was first introduced in Jeddah.

== Classification ==
(All times are in UTC+8)

=== Race one ===
==== Qualification ====
Qualification took place at 10:20 AM on 31 May.

Group draw
Group A	(United Kingdom) ROW	(Portugal) DAC	(United Kingdom) DEN	(Switzerland) MOR	(Switzerland) BUE	(Germany) GUE	(New Zealand) CAS	(United Kingdom) HUG	(Switzerland) MUE	(France) NAT	(Barbados) MAL
Group B	(Germany) WEH	(United Kingdom) BAR	(Netherlands) DEV	(France) JEV	(Belgium) VAN	(United Kingdom) TIC	(Brazil) DIG	(New Zealand) EVA	(United Kingdom) BIR	(Netherlands) FRI	(Germany) BEC

===== Qualifying duels =====
Quarter-finals
A3	(New Zealand) Nick Cassidy
A2	(United Kingdom) Jake Dennis
A4	(United Kingdom) Oliver Rowland
A1	(Germany) Maximilian Günther
B3	(Germany) Pascal Wehrlein
B2	(Netherlands) Nyck de Vries
B4	(Germany) David Beckmann
B1	(United Kingdom) Taylor Barnard

Semi-finals
(New Zealand) Nick Cassidy
(Germany) Maximilian Günther
(Germany) Pascal Wehrlein
(United Kingdom) Taylor Barnard

Final
(Germany) Maximilian Günther
(United Kingdom) Taylor Barnard

==== Overall classification ====
Pos.	No.	Driver	Team	A	B	QF	SF	F	Grid
1	7	(Germany) Maximilian Günther	DS Penske	1:09:939	—N/a	1:08:648	1:08:494	1:08:234	1
2	5	(United Kingdom) Taylor Barnard	McLaren-Nissan	—N/a	1:10:045	1:08:844	1:08:503	1:08:621	2
3	1	(Germany) Pascal Wehrlein	Porsche	—N/a	1:10:287	1:08:683	1:08:648	—N/a	3
4	37	(New Zealand) Nick Cassidy	Jaguar	1:10.275	—N/a	1:08:880	1:08:779	—N/a	4
5	21	(Netherlands) Nyck De Vries	Mahindra	—N/a	1:10:219	1:08:742	—N/a	—N/a	5
6	23	(United Kingdom) Oliver Rowland	Nissan	1:10:297	—N/a	1:08:924	—N/a	—N/a	6
7	27	(United Kingdom) Jake Dennis	Andretti-Porsche	1:10:220	—N/a	1:09:088	—N/a	—N/a	7
8	3	(Germany) David Beckmann	Cupra Kiro-Porsche	—N/a	1:10:357	1:09:266	—N/a	—N/a	8
9	55	(United Kingdom) Jake Hughes	Maserati	1:10:321	—N/a	—N/a	—N/a	—N/a	9
10	25	(France) Jean-Éric Vergne	DS Penske	—N/a	1:10:365	—N/a	—N/a	—N/a	10
11	48	(Switzerland) Edoardo Mortara	Mahindra	1:10:347	—N/a	—N/a	—N/a	—N/a	11
12	8	(United Kingdom) Sam Bird	McLaren-Nissan	—N/a	1:10:407	—N/a	—N/a	—N/a	12
13	51	(Switzerland) Nico Müller	Andretti-Porsche	1:10:414	—N/a	—N/a	—N/a	—N/a	13
14	2	(Belgium) Stoffel Vandoorne	Maserati	—N/a	1:10:413	—N/a	—N/a	—N/a	14
15	17	(France) Norman Nato	Nissan	1:10:415	—N/a	—N/a	—N/a	—N/a	15
16	4	(Netherlands) Robin Frijns	Envision	—N/a	1:10:451	—N/a	—N/a	—N/a	16
17	13	(Portugal) António Félix da Costa	Porsche	1:10:431	—N/a	—N/a	—N/a	—N/a	17
18	9	(New Zealand) Mitch Evans	Jaguar	—N/a	1:10:463	—N/a	—N/a	—N/a	22 (Note: Evans received a 20-place grid penalty due to changing both his MCU component and gearbox in excess of the limit at the previous race in Tokyo.)
19	22	(Barbados) Zane Maloney	Lola Yamaha ABT	1:10:485	—N/a	—N/a	—N/a	—N/a	18
20	11	(Brazil) Lucas di Grassi	Lola Yamaha ABT	—N/a	1:10:467	—N/a	—N/a	—N/a	19
21	16	(Switzerland) Sébastien Buemi	Envision	1:10:525	—N/a	—N/a	—N/a	—N/a	20
22	33	(United Kingdom) Dan Ticktum	Cupra Kiro-Porsche	—N/a	1:10:545	—N/a	—N/a	—N/a	21

==== Race ====
The race took place on 31 May at 3:05 PM. It was the 4th race of the season to feature the Pit Boost stops.

Pos.	No.	Driver	Team	Laps	Time/Retired	Grid	Points
1	7	(Germany) Maximilian Günther	DS Penske	29	36:43.328	1	25+3^{1}
2	25	(France) Jean-Eric Vergne	DS Penske	29	+7.016	10	18
3	5	(United Kingdom) Taylor Barnard	McLaren-Nissan	29	+7.488	2	15+1^{2} (Note: Nick Cassidy had taken the fastest lap in the race, however he was ineligible to receive the point due to being outside the top 10.)
4	33	(United Kingdom) Dan Ticktum	Cupra Kiro-Porsche	29	+7.866	21	12
5	23	(United Kingdom) Oliver Rowland	Nissan	29	+8.140	6	10
6	17	(France) Norman Nato	Nissan	29	+8.242	15	8
7	8	(United Kingdom) Sam Bird	McLaren-Nissan	29	+8.458	12	6
8	21	(Netherlands) Nyck De Vries	Mahindra	29	+8.875	5	4
9	16	(Switzerland) Sébastien Buemi	Envision	29	+9.369	20	2
10	4	(Netherlands) Robin Frijns	Envision	29	+9.677	16	1
11	2	(Belgium) Stoffel Vandoorne	Maserati	29	+10.972	14	
12	1	(Germany) Pascal Wehrlein	Porsche	29	+11.326	3	
13	13	(Portugal) António Félix da Costa	Porsche	29	+11.873	17	
14	3	(Germany) David Beckmann	Cupra Kiro-Porsche	29	+12.123	8	
15	51	(Switzerland) Nico Müller	Andretti-Porsche	29	+13.343	13	
16	55	(United Kingdom) Jake Hughes	Maserati	29	+13.695	9	
17	27	(United Kingdom) Jake Dennis	Andretti-Porsche	29	+13.810	7	
18	11	(Brazil) Lucas di Grassi	Lola Yamaha ABT	29	+16.559	19	
19	22	(Barbados) Zane Maloney	Lola Yamaha ABT	29	+19.327	18	
20	9	(New Zealand) Mitch Evans	Jaguar	29	+43.437	22	
21	37	(New Zealand) Nick Cassidy	Jaguar	29	+50.858	4	
Ret	48	(Switzerland) Edoardo Mortara	Mahindra	24	Collision damage	11	

Notes:

- ^1 – Pole position.
- ^2 – Fastest lap.

==== Standings after the race ====
Drivers' Championship standings

	Pos	Driver	Points
	1	(United Kingdom) Oliver Rowland	171
2	2	(United Kingdom) Taylor Barnard	85
1	3	(Germany) Pascal Wehrlein	84
1	4	(Portugal) António Félix da Costa	73
6	5	(Germany) Maximilian Günther	71

Teams' Championship standings

	Pos	Team	Points
	1	(Japan) Nissan	190
	2	(Germany) Porsche	157
2	3	(United States) DS Penske	135
	4	(United Kingdom) McLaren	112
2	5	(India) Mahindra	103

Manufacturers' Championship standings

Pos	Manufacturer	Points
1	(Japan) Nissan	281
2	(Germany) Porsche	226
3	(Netherlands) Stellantis	191
4	(United Kingdom) Jaguar	151
5	(India) Mahindra	128

- Notes: Only the top five positions are included for all three sets of standings.

=== Race two ===
==== Qualification ====
Qualification was originally set take place at 10:20 AM on 1 June. However, the session was rescheduled to start at 9:00 AM and later postponed to 9:45 AM due to adverse weather conditions. All duels were cancelled and the starting grid was decided through the group stages. The 3 points that normally would be given to the driver on pole position was not awarded.

Group draw
Group A	(United Kingdom) ROW	(Germany) WEH	(Germany) GUE	(Netherlands) DEV	(United Kingdom) TIC	(Switzerland) MOR	(New Zealand) CAS	(United Kingdom) HUG	(New Zealand) EVA	(France) NAT	(Barbados) MAL
Group B	(United Kingdom) BAR	(Portugal) DAC	(France) JEV	(United Kingdom) DEN	(Switzerland) BUE	(Belgium) VAN	(Brazil) DIG	(United Kingdom) BIR	(Switzerland) MUE	(Netherlands) FRI	(Germany) BEC

==== Overall classification ====
Pos.	No.	Driver	Team	A	B	Grid
1	37	(New Zealand) Nick Cassidy	Jaguar	1:31:305	—N/a	1
2	13	(Portugal) António Félix da Costa	Porsche	—N/a	1:32:952	2
3	1	(Germany) Pascal Wehrlein	Porsche	1:31:746	—N/a	3
4	11	(Brazil) Lucas Di Grassi	Lola Yamaha ABT	—N/a	1:33:075	4
5	55	(United Kingdom) Jake Hughes	Maserati	1:32:214	—N/a	5
6	25	(France) Jean-Éric Vergne	DS Penske	—N/a	1:33:145	6
7	21	(Netherlands) Nyck De Vries	Mahindra	1:32:479	—N/a	7
8	2	(Belgium) Stoffel Vandoorne	Maserati	—N/a	1:33:407	8
9	7	(Germany) Maximilian Günther	DS Penske	1:32:572	—N/a	9
10	51	(Switzerland) Nico Müller	Andretti-Porsche	—N/a	1:34:108	10
11	22	(Barbados) Zane Maloney	Lola Yamaha ABT	1:32:611	—N/a	11
12	4	(Netherlands) Robin Frijns	Envision	—N/a	1:34:547	12
13	9	(New Zealand) Mitch Evans	Jaguar	1:32:706	—N/a	13
14	5	(United Kingdom) Taylor Barnard	McLaren-Nissan	—N/a	1:34:696	14
15	48	(Switzerland) Edoardo Mortara	Mahindra	1:32:784	—N/a	15
16	8	(United Kingdom) Sam Bird	McLaren-Nissan	—N/a	1:34:813	16
17	23	(United Kingdom) Oliver Rowland	Nissan	1:32:864	—N/a	17
18	27	(United Kingdom) Jake Dennis	Andretti-Porsche	—N/a	1:34:816	18
19	33	(United Kingdom) Dan Ticktum	Cupra Kiro-Porsche	1:33:965	—N/a	19
20	16	(Switzerland) Sébastien Buemi	Envision	—N/a	1:35:528	20
21	17	(France) Norman Nato	Nissan	1:34:278	—N/a	21
22	3	(Germany) David Beckmann	Cupra Kiro-Porsche	—N/a	1:37:081	22

==== Race ====
The race was originally set to take place on 1 June at 3:05 PM. However, the race is rescheduled to start at 1:00 PM and later postponed to 2:30 PM under the safety car condition due to adverse weather conditions.

Pos.	No.	Driver	Team	Laps	Time/Retired	Grid	Points
1	37	(New Zealand) Nick Cassidy	Jaguar	31	45:54.828	1	25
2	1	(Germany) Pascal Wehrlein	Porsche	31	+7.126	3	18+1^{1}
3	13	(Portugal) António Félix da Costa	Porsche	31	+19.444	2	15
4	55	(United Kingdom) Jake Hughes	Maserati	31	+21.034	5	12
5	25	(France) Jean-Éric Vergne	DS Penske	31	+27.705	6	10
6	51	(Switzerland) Nico Müller	Andretti-Porsche	31	+40.675	10	8
7	2	(Belgium) Stoffel Vandoorne	Maserati	31	+42.242	8	6
8	4	(Netherlands) Robin Frijns	Envision	31	+47.642	12	4
9	11	(Brazil) Lucas di Grassi	Lola Yamaha ABT	31	+52.170	4	2
10	5	(United Kingdom) Taylor Barnard	McLaren-Nissan	31	+52.965	14	1
11	22	(Barbados) Zane Maloney	Lola Yamaha ABT	31	+58.578	11	
12	21	(Netherlands) Nyck De Vries	Mahindra	31	+1:00.357	7	
13	23	(United Kingdom) Oliver Rowland	Nissan	31	+1:01.595	17	
14	9	(New Zealand) Mitch Evans	Jaguar	31	+1:03.205	13	
15	8	(United Kingdom) Sam Bird	McLaren-Nissan	31	+1:04.363	16	
16	33	(United Kingdom) Dan Ticktum	Cupra Kiro-Porsche	31	+1:05.259	19	
17	27	(United Kingdom) Jake Dennis	Andretti-Porsche	31	+1:07.093	18	
18	16	(Switzerland) Sébastien Buemi	Envision	31	+1:07.892	20	
19	48	(Switzerland) Edoardo Mortara	Mahindra	31	+1:09.668	15	
20	3	(Germany) David Beckmann	Cupra Kiro-Porsche	31	+1:11.727	22	
21	17	(France) Norman Nato	Nissan	31	+1:12.814	21	
Ret	7	(Germany) Maximilian Günther	DS Penske	18	Technical issue	9	

Notes:

- ^1 – Fastest lap.

==== Standings after the race ====
Drivers' Championship standings

	Pos	Driver	Points
	1	(United Kingdom) Oliver Rowland	171
1	2	(Germany) Pascal Wehrlein	103
1	3	(Portugal) António Félix da Costa	88
2	4	(United Kingdom) Taylor Barnard	86
1	5	(France) Jean-Éric Vergne	74

Teams' Championship standings

	Pos	Team	Points
1	1	(Germany) Porsche	191
1	2	(Japan) Nissan	190
	3	(United States) DS Penske	145
	4	(United Kingdom) McLaren	113
	5	(India) Mahindra	103

Manufacturers' Championship standings

Pos	Manufacturer	Points
1	(Japan) Nissan	285
2	(Germany) Porsche	259
3	(Netherlands) Stellantis	213
4	(United Kingdom) Jaguar	184
5	(India) Mahindra	129

- Notes: Only the top five positions are included for all three sets of standings.

== Notes ==
Previous race: 2025 Tokyo ePrix	FIA Formula E World Championship; 2024–25 season	Next race: 2025 Jakarta ePrix
Previous race: 2024 Shanghai ePrix	Shanghai ePrix	Next race: 2026 Shanghai ePrix
