= Shanghai International Circuit =

Motorsport race track in Jiading, Shanghai, China

- Grand Prix Circuit (2004–present)
- Location: Jiading, Shanghai, China
- Coordinates: 31°20′20″N 121°13′11″E
- Capacity: 200,000
- FIA Grade: 1 (Grand Prix); 2 (International); 3E (West Long)
- Owner: Shanghai Jiushi Group (92%); Shanghai International Automobile City (8%)
- Operator: Shanghai International Circuit Co., Ltd.
- Broke ground: April 2003; 23 years ago
- Opened: 6 June 2004; 22 years ago
- Construction cost: ¥2.6 billion ($450 million, €370 million)
- Architect: Hermann Tilke
- Major events: Current: Formula One; Chinese Grand Prix (2004–2019, 2024–present); Formula E Shanghai ePrix (2024–present); Porsche Carrera Cup Asia (2004–2019, 2021, 2023–present); GT World Challenge Asia (2017–2019, 2024, 2026); Future: World SBK (2027); Former: FIA WEC; 4 Hours of Shanghai (2012–2019); Grand Prix motorcycle racing Chinese motorcycle Grand Prix (2005–2008); WTCC Race of China (2012–2016); Asian Le Mans Series (2014, 2018–2019); TCR Asia Series (2016–2019, 2021, 2025); A1 Grand Prix (2006–2008); V8 Supercars China round (2005)
- Website: shang-sai.com

Grand Prix Circuit (2004–present)
- Length: 5.451 km (3.387 mi)
- Turns: 16
- Race lap record: 1:32.238 ( (Germany) Michael Schumacher, Ferrari F2004, 2004, F1)

Motorcycle Grand Prix Circuit (2004–present)
- Length: 5.281 km (3.281 mi)
- Turns: 16
- Race lap record: 1:59.273 ( (Italy) Valentino Rossi, Yamaha YZR-M1, 2008, MotoGP)

Intermediate Circuit (2004–present)
- Length: 4.603 km (2.860 mi)
- Turns: 14
- Race lap record: 1:35.177 ( (Canada) Robert Wickens, Lola A1GP, 2008, A1GP)

West Long Circuit (2012–present)
- Length: 3.051 km (1.896 mi)
- Turns: 12
- Race lap record: 1:10.564 ( (New Zealand) Nick Cassidy, Jaguar I-Type 7, 2025, F-E)

The Shanghai International Circuit (simplified Chinese: 上海国际赛车场; traditional Chinese: 上海國際賽車場; pinyin: Shànghǎi Guójì Sàichēchǎng), a.k.a. SAIC Shanghai International Circuit (simplified Chinese: 上海上汽国际赛车场; traditional Chinese: 上海上汽國際賽車場; pinyin: Shànghǎi Shàngqì Guójì Sàichēchǎng) for sponsorship purposes, is a motorsport race track, situated in the Jiading, Shanghai, China. The circuit is best known as the venue for the annual Chinese Grand Prix which was hosted from 2004 to 2019, and from 2024 onwards. Besides Chinese Grand Prix, the circuit also hosts Shanghai ePrix starting from 2024.

The Shanghai International Circuit features over 10 top-tier domestic car racing events annually. It also boasts Shanghai's only world-class outdoor go-karting track.

As a nationally recognized 4A-rated tourist attraction, the circuit features tourism, shopping, dining, entertainment, and sports.

The track was resurfaced ahead of the 2025 Chinese Grand Prix.

== History ==
Shanghai International Circuit was conceived by the Shanghai authorities as a way to showcase the city to the world. A 5.3 sq km site was chosen in the Jiading District in the north west of the city, close to major car parts manufacturing facilities and a budget of 2.6 billion yuan ($450 million) raised through a government-funded joint-venture company, the Shanghai Jiushi Group.

Herman Tilke was chosen to design the track and associated buildings, and between April and May 2003, engineers visited the site to draw up their plans. The site was actually a swampland, previously used as rice paddy fields, and extensive groundworks had to be completed to construct the circuit. For 18 months some 3,000 workers were on site daily to complete the facility – a remarkable feat of both engineering and logistics.

When it opened, visitors found a vast complex, dominated by the main grandstand and pit complex, which featured wing-like viewing platforms crossing the circuit at either end. This can hold 30,000 spectators alone, and others around the circuit take the total capacity to 200,000. Paddock facilities were also unique – each of the F1 teams had its own building, arranged like pavilions in a lake to resemble the ancient Yu Garden in Shanghai.

The Shanghai International Circuit is the first in China to be purpose-built for Formula One and it hosts FIA Formula One World Championship Chinese Grand Prix every year since 2004. The circuit also held a number of global high-profile series, including the FIA World Endurance Championship and the GT World Challenge Asia.

In the past, the circuit has hosted the MotoGP world championship, and a one-off V8 Supercars China Round of the Australian-based V8 Supercar championship in 2005, and also the final round of the A1 Grand Prix in 2006/2007.

In 2011, the Shanghai International Circuit signed a sponsorship deal with Audi and was subsequently named the Shanghai Audi International Circuit and the SAIC International Circuit following a deal with SAIC Motor.

== Layout ==
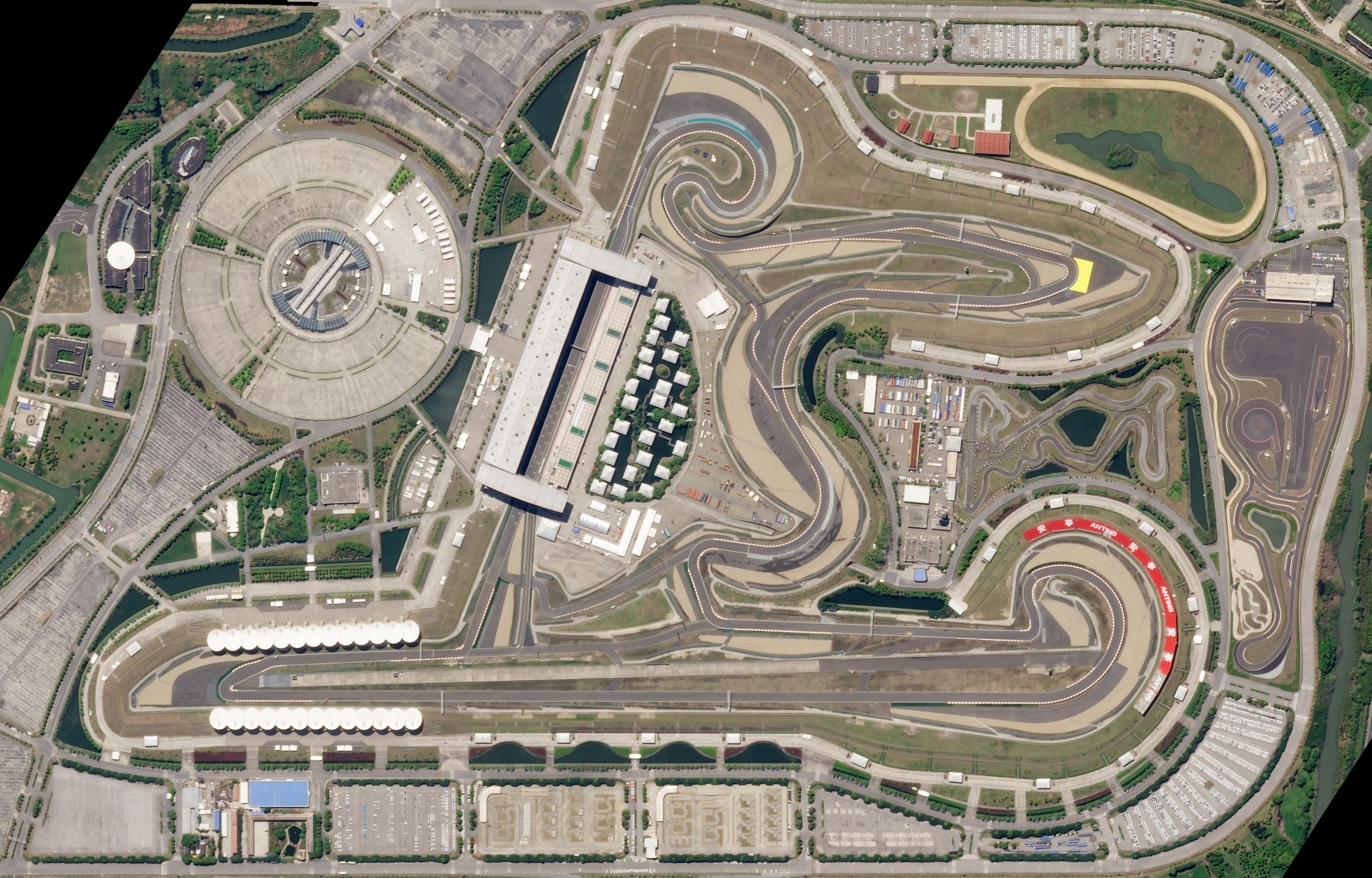
Satellite image of the circuit, as it appeared in April 2018

The track layout was inspired from the Chinese character "shang" (上), the first character in the name of the city Shanghai, meaning "above" or "ascend".

The start of the lap includes tightening Turns 1 and 2, before drivers dart through 3 and 4. It also includes a super-high g force Turns 7 and 8, while the circuit also features one of the longest straights on the calendar, the 1.2 km (0.7 mi) stretch that separates turns 13 and 14.

== A lap in a Formula One car ==
The first two bends make a 185 km/h (115 mph) right-hand curve which leads immediately into turns 3 and 4 taken at 105 km/h (65 mph). One and two are far more difficult – a lift on entry followed by various taps of the throttle and brakes are needed so the car maintains balance throughout. It also becomes blind towards the middle of the corner. Three and four are less complicated, with three being a simple hairpin, but a good exit is needed from four to gain speed down the following straight and through turn 5. The complex of turns 1–4 makes up the first of two "snails" on the circuit, the other being turns 11–13. Turn 6 is a second gear, right-handed hairpin with plentiful run-off. Turns 7 and 8 make up a high speed chicane – the left-right complex sees a constant G-force of 3 and a minimum speed of about 160 km/h (99 mph). Turns 9 and 10 immediately follow – two slow left-handers which require a good exit to gain speed down the next straight. Turns 11 and 12 effectively make up a slow left-right chicane where the use of kerbs are important but traction is low. Turn 13 is a very long right-hander which becomes less and less tight, and a very good exit is important as it leads onto a long straight where overtaking opportunities can arise. At 1.170 km (0.727 mi), it is the equivalent to 11 football pitches laid end to end, or the same length as three and a half of the world's biggest aircraft carriers Turn 14 is a tight hairpin at the end of the straight – this second-gear corner is a prime overtaking spot, with drivers often making their move under heavy braking at the end of the long run. Turn 16 is the last corner – a fourth-gear left-hander which requires a quick tap on the brakes – braking early can be more effective as you can then carry more speed through the corner and then down the pit straight.

== Events ==
Current

- March: Formula One Chinese Grand Prix, F1 Academy, SRO GT Cup, Porsche Carrera Cup Asia
- April: TCR China Touring Car Championship, TCR China Challenge, F4 Chinese Championship, China GT Championship
- July: Formula E Shanghai ePrix
- September: Lamborghini Super Trofeo Asia, TCR China Touring Car Championship, TCR China Challenge, China GT Championship, Shanghai 8 Hours
- November: GT World Challenge Asia, SRO GT Cup

Future

- Formula Regional Asian Championship (2018–2019, 2027)
- Superbike World Championship (2027)
- Supersport World Championship (2027)

Former

- A1 Grand Prix (2006–2008)
- Asian Le Mans Series
  - 4 Hours of Shanghai (2014, 2018–2019)
- Aston Martin Asia Cup (2008–2009)
- Audi R8 LMS Cup (2012–2019)
- China Formula Grand Prix (2015–2019)
- Ferrari Challenge Asia-Pacific (2011–2019)
- FIA World Endurance Championship
  - 4 Hours of Shanghai (2012–2019)
- Formula BMW Pacific (2004–2008)
- Formula Masters Series (2011–2017)
- Formula Renault AsiaCup (2004–2011, 2013–2018)
- Formula V6 Asia (2008)
- Grand Prix motorcycle racing
  - Chinese motorcycle Grand Prix (2005–2008)
- GP2 Asia Series (2008)
- GT Asia Series (2014–2017)
- Superrace Championship (2014–2016)
- TCR Asia Series (2016–2019, 2021, 2025)
- TCR International Series (2015)
- Trofeo Maserati (2012–2014)
- V8 Supercars
  - V8 Supercars China Round (2005)
- World Touring Car Championship
  - FIA WTCC Race of China (2012–2016)

== Lap records ==
The total length of the circuit is 5.451 km (3.387 mi), which is about average for a Formula One circuit. Michael Schumacher's official race lap record of 1:32.238 has stood since 2004. In Q3 of the 2025 Chinese Grand Prix, Oscar Piastri qualified on pole position with a time of 1:30.641, a new unofficial track record. As of September 2026, the fastest official race lap records at the Shanghai International Circuit are listed as:

Category	Record	Circuit length	Circuit layout	Driver/Rider	Vehicle	Date
Formula One	1:32:238	5.451 km (3.387 mi)		(Germany) Michael Schumacher	Ferrari F2004	26 September 2004
LMP1	1:45.892	5.451 km (3.387 mi)		(Switzerland) Sébastien Buemi	Toyota TS050 Hybrid 2017	5 November 2017
GP2 Asia	1:46.407	5.451 km (3.387 mi)		(Japan) Kamui Kobayashi	Dallara GP2/05	18 October 2008
LMP2	1:51.793	5.451 km (3.387 mi)		(Brazil) Bruno Senna	Oreca 07 Gibson	5 November 2017
A1 Grand Prix	1:52.508	5.451 km (3.387 mi)		(Malaysia) Alex Yoong	Lola A1GP	2 April 2006
GT3	1:59.643	5.451 km (3.387 mi)		(China) Deng Yi	Porsche 911 (992 II) GT3 R	18 April 2026
LMP3	2:00.638	5.451 km (3.387 mi)		(Switzerland) Mathias Beche	Ligier JS P3	27 August 2017
LM GTE	2:00.948	5.451 km (3.387 mi)		(France) Kévin Estre	Porsche 911 RSR-19	10 November 2019
Formula Regional	2:01.440	5.451 km (3.387 mi)		(China) Daniel Cao	Tatuus F3 T-318	27 September 2019
Ferrari Challenge	2:02.728	5.451 km (3.387 mi)		(China) Zhang Yaqi	Ferrari 296 Challenge	6 September 2026
Lamborghini Super Trofeo	2:02.994	5.451 km (3.387 mi)		(Monaco) Jonathan Cecotto	Lamborghini Huracán Super Trofeo Evo2	18 May 2025
Porsche Carrera Cup	2:03.497	5.451 km (3.387 mi)		(China) Luo Kailuo	Porsche 911 (992 II) Cup	15 March 2026
Formula 4	2:04.580	5.451 km (3.387 mi)		(United States) Chloe Chambers	Tatuus F4-T421	22 March 2025
Formula Renault 2.0	2:04.675	5.451 km (3.387 mi)		(China) Daniel Cao	Tatuus FR2.0/13	29 April 2018
GT4	2:10.489	5.451 km (3.387 mi)		(China) Lu Wenlong	Lotus Emira GT4	23 March 2025
TCR Touring Car	2:10.712	5.451 km (3.387 mi)		(China) Zhang Zhendong	Hyundai Elantra N TCR	26 April 2025
Formula BMW	2:12.155	5.451 km (3.387 mi)		(Australia) Michael Patrizi	Mygale FB02	16 October 2005
MotoGP	1:59.273	5.281 km (3.281 mi)		(Italy) Valentino Rossi	Yamaha YZR-M1	4 May 2008
250cc	2:05.738	5.281 km (3.281 mi)		(Spain) Jorge Lorenzo	Aprilia RSW 250	6 May 2007
125cc	2:12.131	5.281 km (3.281 mi)		(Spain) Álvaro Bautista	Aprilia RS 125 R	14 May 2006
A1 Grand Prix	1:35.177	4.603 km (2.860 mi)		(Canada) Robert Wickens	Lola A1GP	13 April 2008
Formula Renault 2.0	1:48.325	4.603 km (2.860 mi)		(Finland) Leopold Ringbom	Tatuus FR2000	23 October 2011
TC1	1:50.833	4.603 km (2.860 mi)		(China) Ma Qinghua	Citroën C-Elysée WTCC	12 October 2014
V8 Supercars	1:51.0557	4.603 km (2.860 mi)		(Australia) Todd Kelly	Holden VZ Commodore	12 June 2005
Super 2000	1:54.947	4.603 km (2.860 mi)		(Switzerland) Alain Menu	Chevrolet Cruze 1.6T	4 November 2012
TCR Touring Car	1:59.143	4.603 km (2.860 mi)		(China) Huang Chuhan	Audi RS 3 LMS TCR (2017)	5 August 2017
Formula Renault 3.5	2:01.581	4.603 km (2.860 mi)		(Taiwan) Kevin Chen	Tatuus FRV6	23 November 2008
Porsche Carrera Cup	2:02.2892	4.603 km (2.860 mi)		(China) Siu Tit Lung	Porsche 911 (997 I) GT3 Cup	12 June 2005
Formula E	1:10.564	3.051 km (1.896 mi)		(New Zealand) Nick Cassidy	Jaguar I-Type 7	31 May 2025

== Gallery ==
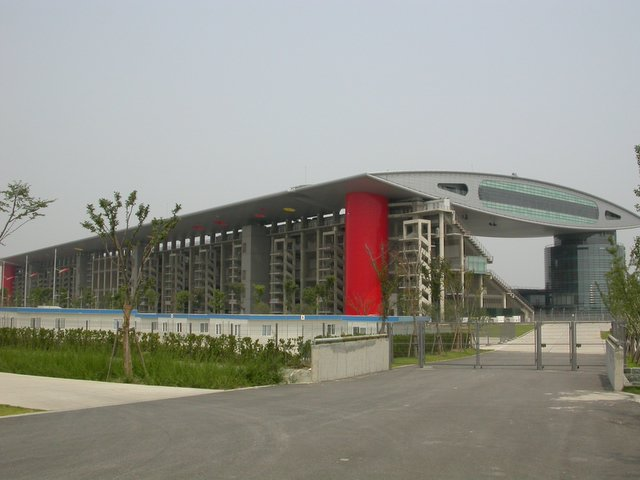
Exterior of main grandstand

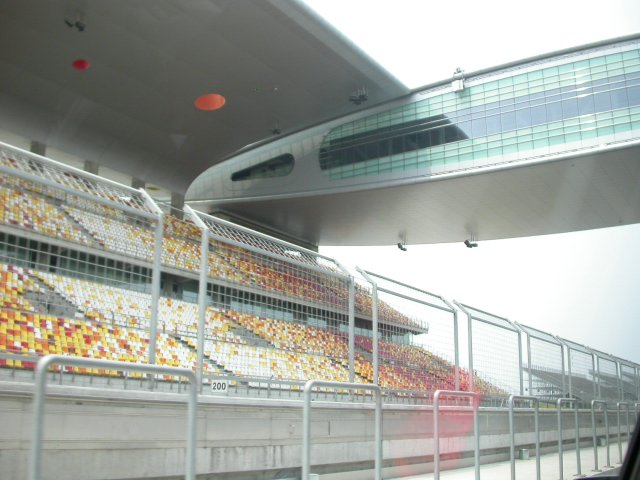
Main grandstand

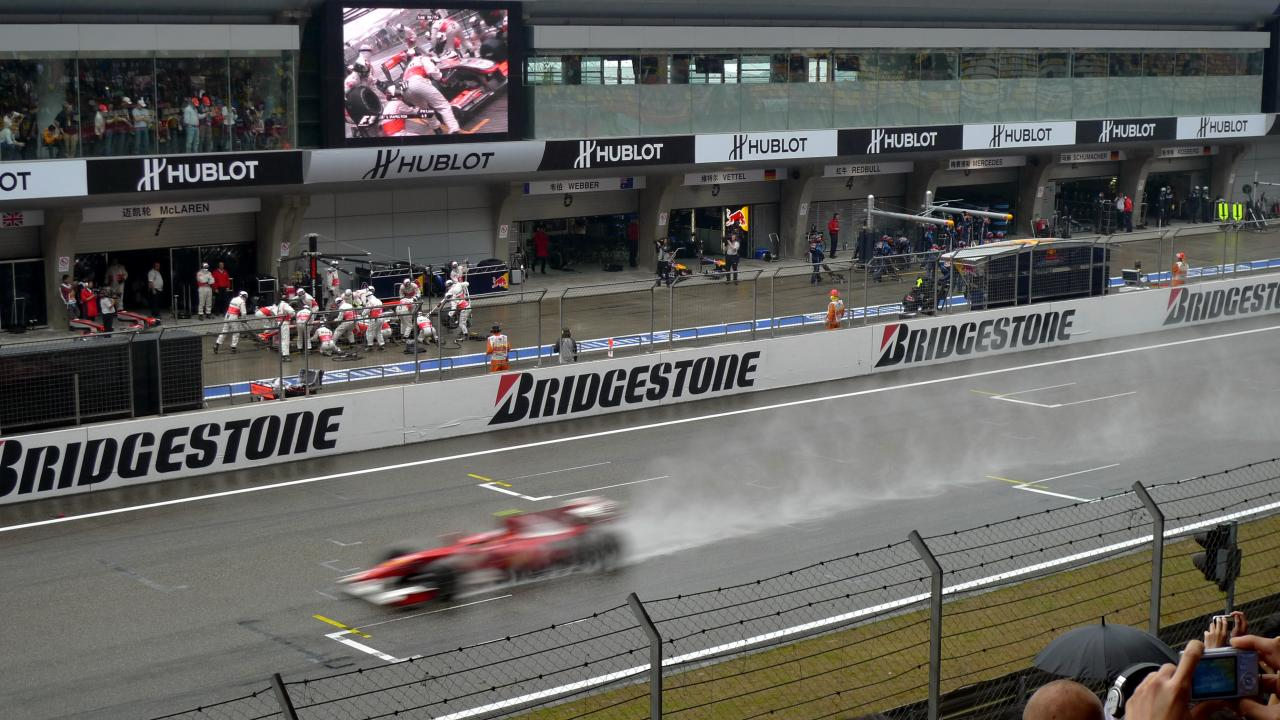
View from the main grandstand

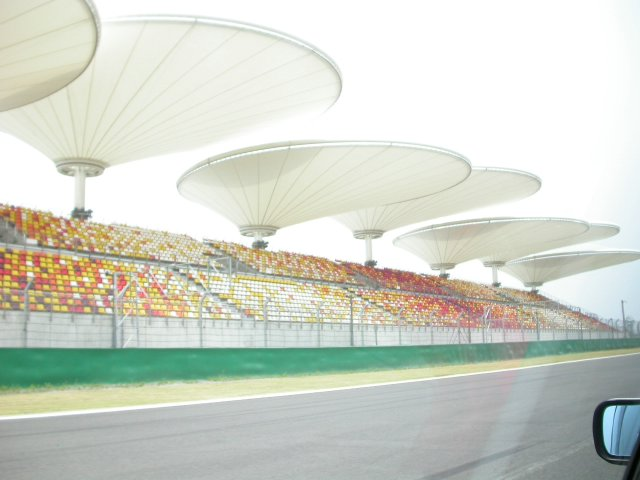
Covered grandstand H & K

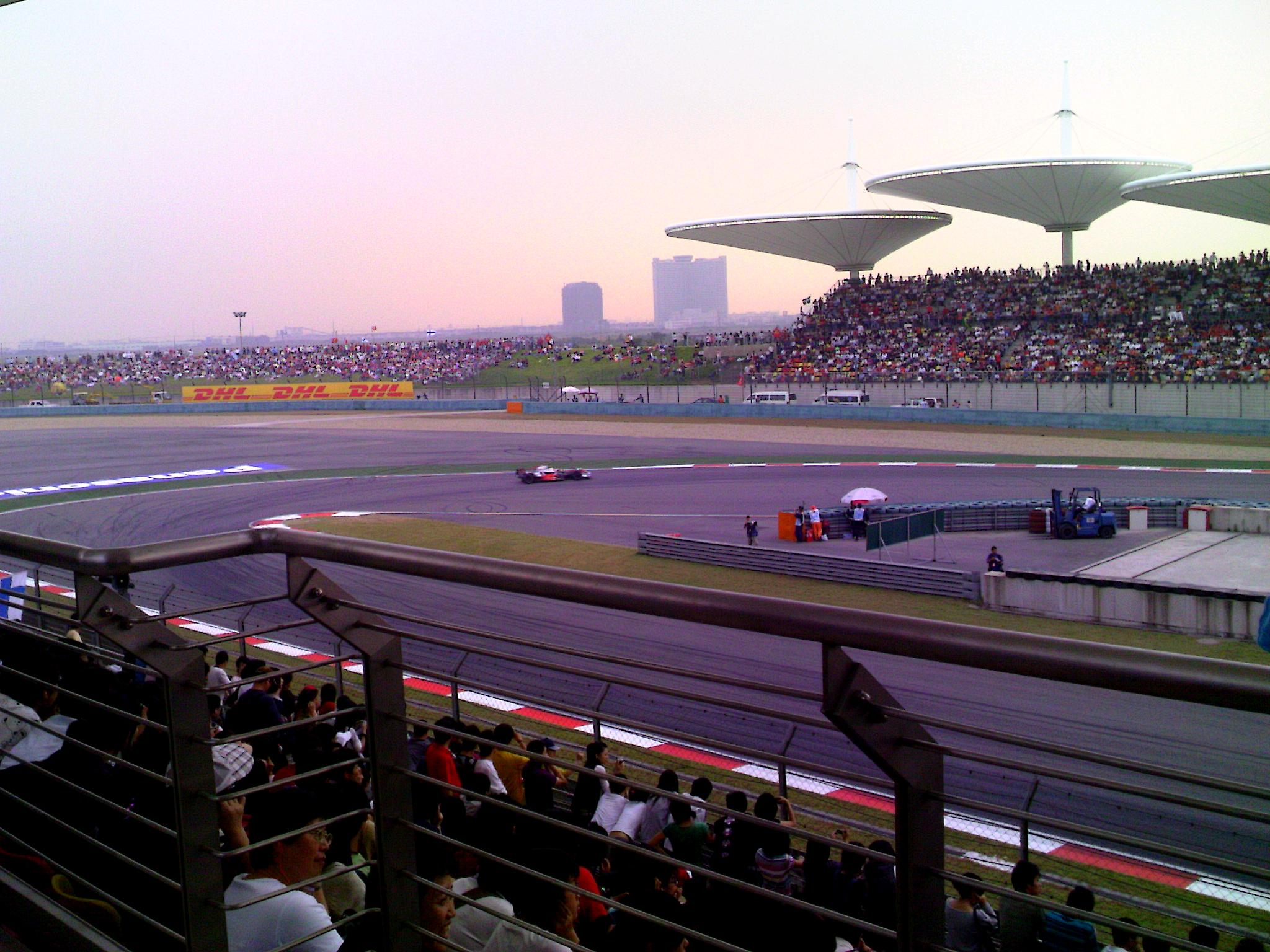
Grandstand H & K

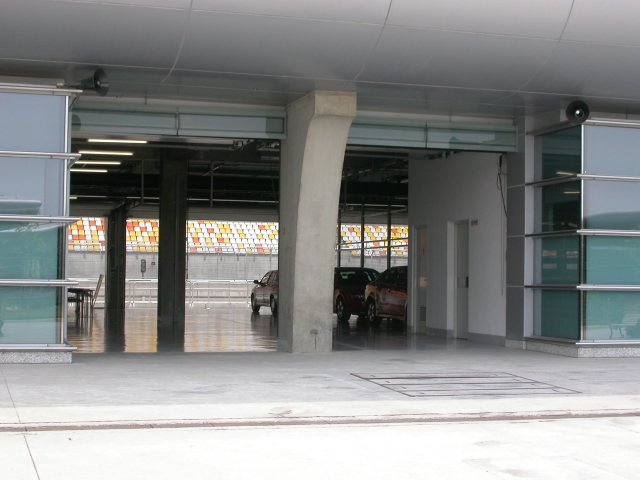
Pit
