= Jeddah Formula 2 round =

(Saudi Arabia) Jeddah Formula 2 round

FIA Formula 2 Championship
- Venue: Jeddah Corniche Circuit
- Location: Jeddah, Saudi Arabia
- First race: 2021
- Most wins (driver): (Australia) Oscar Piastri (2)
- Most wins (team): (Italy) Prema Racing (Netherlands) MP Motorsport (both 3)
- Lap record: 1:43.098 ( (Australia) Jack Doohan, Virtuosi Racing, F2 2018, 2022)

The Jeddah Formula 2 round is a FIA Formula 2 Championship series race that is run on the Jeddah Corniche Circuit track in Jeddah, Saudi Arabia.

== Winners ==
Year	Race	Driver	Team	Report
2021	Sprint 1	(New Zealand) Marcus Armstrong	DAMS	Report
2021	Sprint 2	(Australia) Oscar Piastri	Prema Racing	Report
2021	Feature	(Australia) Oscar Piastri	Prema Racing	Report
2022	Sprint	(New Zealand) Liam Lawson	Carlin	Report
2022	Feature	(Brazil) Felipe Drugovich	MP Motorsport	Report
2023	Sprint	(Japan) Ayumu Iwasa	DAMS	Report
2023	Feature	(Denmark) Frederik Vesti	Prema Racing	Report
2024	Sprint	(Norway) Dennis Hauger	MP Motorsport	Report
2024	Feature	(Brazil) Enzo Fittipaldi	Van Amersfoort Racing	Report
2025	Sprint	(United Kingdom) Arvid Lindblad	Campos Racing	Report
2025	Feature	(Netherlands) Richard Verschoor	MP Motorsport	Report

== See also ==
- Saudi Arabian Grand Prix
