= 2022 Jeddah Formula 2 round =

Motor racing event

(Saudi Arabia) 2022 Jeddah Formula 2 round
Round details
- Round 2 of 14 in the 2022 FIA Formula 2 Championship.
- Location: Jeddah Corniche Circuit; Jeddah, Saudi Arabia
- Course: Street Circuit; 6.174 km (3.836 mi)

Sprint Race
- Date: 26 March 2022
- Laps: 20
Podium
First	(New Zealand) Liam Lawson	Carlin
Second	(Estonia) Jüri Vips	Hitech Grand Prix
Third	(Brazil) Felipe Drugovich	MP Motorsport
Fastest lap
Driver	(Estonia) Jüri Vips	Hitech Grand Prix
- Time: 1:43.284 (on lap 20)

Feature Race
- Date: 27 March 2022
- Laps: 28
Pole position
Driver	(Brazil) Felipe Drugovich	MP Motorsport
Time	1:40.422	
Podium
First	(Brazil) Felipe Drugovich	MP Motorsport
Second	(Netherlands) Richard Verschoor	Trident
Third	(India) Jehan Daruvala	Prema Racing
Fastest lap
Driver	(Australia) Jack Doohan	Virtuosi Racing
- Time: 1:43.098 (on Lap 26)

The 2022 Jeddah FIA Formula 2 round was a motor racing event held between 25 and 27 March 2022 at the Jeddah Corniche Circuit. It was the second round of the 2022 FIA Formula 2 Championship and was held in support of the 2022 Saudi Arabian Grand Prix.

== Classification ==
=== Qualifying ===
The qualifying session was held on 25 March 2022. Felipe Drugovich took pole position, the second of his Formula 2 career. The qualifying session was marred by three red flags. The first red flag came out for Théo Pourchaire, whose car broke down. A second red flag was flown after Logan Sargeant crashed heavily at the exit of turn 17. Oddly, a third red flag was shown due to a technical error after GPS systems indicated that Frederik Vesti stopped on track, despite no such event occurring. In addition, Cem Bölükbaşı crashed in practice and was taken to hospital for precautionary checks, and as a result missed qualifying. He was later withdrawn from the event.

Jack Doohan was later disqualified from the final classification for failing to provide the minimum 0.8 kg fuel sample. Jüri Vips, Olli Caldwell, and Frederik Vesti each received three-place grid penalties for impeding. Clément Novalak received a five-place grid penalty for what the race stewards deemed to be a "dangerous case of impeding." Amaury Cordeel received a ten-place grid penalty for failing to slow for the red flag and double waved yellow flags.

Pos.	No.	Driver	Entrant	Time	Grid SR	Grid FR
1	11	(Brazil) Felipe Drugovich	MP Motorsport	1:40.422	10	1
2	20	(Netherlands) Richard Verschoor	Trident	+0.226	9	2
3	7	(New Zealand) Marcus Armstrong	Hitech Grand Prix	+0.628	8	3
4	15	(Switzerland) Ralph Boschung	Campos Racing	+0.635	7	4
5	5	(New Zealand) Liam Lawson	Carlin	+0.720	5	5
6	17	(Japan) Ayumu Iwasa	DAMS	+0.772	4	6
7	21	(Australia) Calan Williams	Trident	+1.047	3	7
8	8	(Estonia) Jüri Vips	Hitech Grand Prix	+1.111	6^{1}	8
9	24	(United Kingdom) Jake Hughes	Van Amersfoort Racing	+1.116	2	9
10	1	(Norway) Dennis Hauger	Prema Racing	+1.288	1	10
11	12	(France) Clément Novalak	MP Motorsport	+1.288	15^{2}	11
12	16	(Israel) Roy Nissany	DAMS	+1.549	11	12
13	4	(Japan) Marino Sato	Virtuosi Racing	+1.756	12	13
14	2	(India) Jehan Daruvala	Prema Racing	+1.759	13	14
15	22	(Brazil) Enzo Fittipaldi	Charouz Racing System	+2.098	14	15
16	9	(Denmark) Frederik Vesti	ART Grand Prix	+2.483	17^{1}	16
17	14	(United Kingdom) Olli Caldwell	Campos Racing	+2.698	19^{1}	17
18	6	(United States) Logan Sargeant	Carlin	+2.838	16	18
19	25	(Belgium) Amaury Cordeel	Van Amersfoort Racing	+4.015	20^{3}	19
20	10	(France) Théo Pourchaire	ART Grand Prix	+4.314	18	20
107% time: 1:47.451
—	23	(Turkey) Cem Bölükbaşı	Charouz Racing System	No time set	WD	
DSQ	3	(Australia) Jack Doohan	Virtuosi Racing	+0.602	21^{4}	21^{4}

Notes:

- ^1 – Jüri Vips, Olli Caldwell, and Frederik Vesti received three-place grid penalties for impeding another driver during qualifying. Each driver had one penalty point added to their license.
- ^2 – Clément Novalak received a five-place grid penalty for what was deemed a dangerous case of impeding another driver. Novalak had three penalty points added to his license.
- ^3 – Amaury Cordeel received a ten-place grid penalty for failing to respect red and double waved yellow flags. Cordeel had four penalty points added to his license.
- ^4 – Jack Doohan was disqualified for failing to supply an adequate fuel sample after qualifying. He was given permission to race by the stewards.

=== Sprint Race ===
Pos.	No.	Driver	Entrant	Laps	Time/Retired	Grid	Points
1	5	(New Zealand) Liam Lawson	Carlin	20	47:55.487	5	10
2	8	(Estonia) Jüri Vips	Hitech Grand Prix	20	+3.166	6	8 (1)
3	11	(Brazil) Felipe Drugovich	MP Motorsport	20	+4.846	10	6
4	21	(Australia) Calan Williams	Trident	20	+6.277	3	5
5	20	(Netherlands) Richard Verschoor	Trident	20	+12.121	9	4
6	17	(Japan) Ayumu Iwasa	DAMS	20	+13.520	4	3
7	2	(India) Jehan Daruvala	Prema Racing	20	+15.237	13	2
8	4	(Japan) Marino Sato	Virtuosi Racing	20	+16.040	12	1
9	16	(Israel) Roy Nissany	DAMS	20	+17.390	11	
10	22	(Brazil) Enzo Fittipaldi	Charouz Racing System	20	+17.441	14	
11	12	(France) Clément Novalak	MP Motorsport	20	+18.739	15	
12	9	(Denmark) Frederik Vesti	ART Grand Prix	20	+20.298	17	
13	10	(France) Théo Pourchaire	ART Grand Prix	20	+20.569	18	
14	14	(United Kingdom) Olli Caldwell	Campos Racing	20	+25.495	19	
15	15	(Switzerland) Ralph Boschung	Campos Racing	20	+34.454^{1}	7	
16	1	(Norway) Dennis Hauger	Prema Racing	20	+51.495	1	
DNF	7	(New Zealand) Marcus Armstrong	Hitech Grand Prix	17	Spin	8	
DNF	6	(United States) Logan Sargeant	Carlin	6	Collision	16	
DNF	3	(Australia) Jack Doohan	Virtuosi Racing	6	Collision	21	
DNF	25	(Belgium) Amaury Cordeel	Van Amersfoort Racing	1	Accident	20	
DSQ	24	(United Kingdom) Jake Hughes	Van Amersfoort Racing	20	~~(+3.224)~~^{2}	2	
WD	23	(Turkey) Cem Bölükbaşı	Charouz Racing System	—	Withdrew	—	
Fastest lap set by (Estonia) Jüri Vips: 1:43.284 (lap 20)

Notes:

- ^1 – Ralph Boschung originally finished eighth, but was given a 20-second time penalty after it was found that he was in front of his starting grid position before the lights went out. Two penalty points were added to his license.
- ^2 – Jake Hughes originally finished third, but was later disqualified due to a technical non-conformity. The skid plank on his car was found to have a maximum thickness of 3.6mm, which did not meet the required thickness of 5mm +/-1mm.

=== Feature Race ===
Pos.	No.	Driver	Entrant	Laps	Time/Retired	Grid	Points
1	11	(Brazil) Felipe Drugovich	MP Motorsport	27	47:41.485	1	25 (2)
2	20	(Netherlands) Richard Verschoor	Trident	27	+2.379	2	18
3	2	(India) Jehan Daruvala	Prema Racing	27	+15.358	14	15
4	24	(United Kingdom) Jake Hughes	Van Amersfoort Racing	27	+19.117	9	12
5	7	(New Zealand) Marcus Armstrong	Hitech Grand Prix	27	+20.595	3	10
6	1	(Norway) Dennis Hauger	Prema Racing	27	+21.071	10	8
7	17	(Japan) Ayumu Iwasa	DAMS	27	+27.108	6	6
8	16	(Israel) Roy Nissany	DAMS	27	+28.428	12	4
9	3	(Australia) Jack Doohan	Virtuosi Racing	27	+28.861	20	2 (1)
10	8	(Estonia) Jüri Vips	Hitech Grand Prix	27	+32.173	14	1
11	22	(Brazil) Enzo Fittipaldi	Charouz Racing System	27	+32.647	15	
12	6	(United States) Logan Sargeant	Carlin	27	+37.612	18	
13	21	(Australia) Calan Williams	Trident	27	+38.282	7	
14	12	(France) Clément Novalak	MP Motorsport	27	+42.370	11	
15	15	(Switzerland) Ralph Boschung	Campos Racing	27	+47.601	4	
16	14	(United Kingdom) Olli Caldwell	Campos Racing	27	+48.706	17	
17	4	(Japan) Marino Sato	Virtuosi Racing	27	+50.384	13	
18	9	(Denmark) Frederik Vesti	ART Grand Prix	26	Spun off	16	
DNF	5	(New Zealand) Liam Lawson	Carlin	9	Wheel	5	
DNF	10	(France) Théo Pourchaire	ART Grand Prix	5	Gearbox	19	
DNS	25	(Belgium) Amaury Cordeel	Van Amersfoort Racing	—	Did not start^{1}	—	
WD	23	(Turkey) Cem Bölükbaşı	Charouz Racing System	—	Withdrew	—	
Fastest lap set by (Australia) Jack Doohan: 1:43.098 (lap 26)

Notes:

- ^1 – Amaury Cordeel could not start the Feature Race due to car damage sustained in the Sprint Race.

== Standings after the event ==
Drivers' Championship standings

	Pos.	Driver	Points
4	1	(Brazil) Felipe Drugovich	45
	2	(New Zealand) Liam Lawson	34
3	3	(Netherlands) Richard Verschoor	32
1	4	(Estonia) Jüri Vips	28
4	5	(France) Théo Pourchaire	25

Teams' Championship standings

	Pos.	Team	Points
1	1	(United Kingdom) Hitech Grand Prix	48
3	2	(Netherlands) MP Motorsport	45
2	3	(United Kingdom) Carlin	43
2	4	(Italy) Trident	37
2	5	(Italy) Prema Racing	33

- Note: Only the top five positions are included for both sets of standings.

== See also ==
- 2022 Saudi Arabian Grand Prix

Previous round: 2022 Sakhir Formula 2 round	FIA Formula 2 Championship; 2022 season	Next round: 2022 Imola Formula 2 round
Previous round: 2021 Jeddah Formula 2 round	Jeddah Formula 2 round	Next round: 2023 Jeddah Formula 2 round
