= 2023 Budapest Formula 2 round =

9th round of the Formula 2 Championship

(Hungary) 2023 Budapest Formula 2 round
Round details
- Round 9 of 13 in the 2023 FIA Formula 2 Championship.
- Layout of the Hungaroring
- Location: Hungaroring; Mogyoród, Hungary
- Course: Permanent racing circuit 4.381 km (2.722 mi)

Sprint Race
- Date: 22 July 2023
- Laps: 28
Podium
First	(Norway) Dennis Hauger	MP Motorsport
Second	(Japan) Ayumu Iwasa	DAMS
Third	(United Kingdom) Oliver Bearman	Prema Racing
Fastest lap
Driver	(Japan) Ayumu Iwasa	DAMS
- Time: 1:32.585 (on lap 28)

Feature Race
- Date: 23 July 2023
- Laps: 37
Pole position
Driver	(Australia) Jack Doohan	Invicta Virtuosi Racing
Time	1:27.676	
Podium
First	(Australia) Jack Doohan	Invicta Virtuosi Racing
Second	(Denmark) Frederik Vesti	Prema Racing
Third	(France) Victor Martins	ART Grand Prix
Fastest lap
Driver	(Australia) Jack Doohan	Invicta Virtuosi Racing
- Time: 1:30.997 (on lap 36)

The 2023 Budapest FIA Formula 2 round was a motor racing event held between 21 and 23 July 2023 at the Hungaroring, Mogyoród, Hungary. It was the ninth round of the 2023 Formula 2 Championship and was held in support of the 2023 Hungarian Grand Prix.

== Classification ==
=== Qualifying ===
Jack Doohan clinched pole position by 0.052 seconds ahead of Victor Martins, while championship leader Frederik Vesti qualified in third right in front of Théo Pourchaire, his nearest championship rival.

Pos.	No.	Driver	Entrant	Time	Grid SR	Grid FR
1	14	(Australia) Jack Doohan	Invicta Virtuosi Racing	1:27.676	10	1
2	6	(France) Victor Martins	ART Grand Prix	+0.052	9	2
3	7	(Denmark) Frederik Vesti	Prema Racing	+0.091	8	3
4	5	(France) Théo Pourchaire	ART Grand Prix	+0.254	7	4
5	10	(France) Isack Hadjar	Hitech Pulse-Eight	+0.311	6	5
6	11	(Japan) Ayumu Iwasa	DAMS	+0.414	5	6
7	8	(United Kingdom) Oliver Bearman	Prema Racing	+0.425	4	7
8	2	(India) Jehan Daruvala	MP Motorsport	+0.477	3	8
9	1	(Norway) Dennis Hauger	MP Motorsport	+0.479	2	9
10	24	(India) Kush Maini	Campos Racing	+0.488	1	10
11	4	(Brazil) Enzo Fittipaldi	Rodin Carlin	+0.591	11	11
12	22	(Netherlands) Richard Verschoor	Van Amersfoort Racing	+0.610	12	12
13	25	(Switzerland) Ralph Boschung	Campos Racing	+0.640	13	13
14	3	(Barbados) Zane Maloney	Rodin Carlin	+0.645	14	14
15	21	(France) Clément Novalak	Trident	+0.866	15	20^{1}
16	23	(United States) Juan Manuel Correa	Van Amersfoort Racing	+1.088	19^{2}	15
17	12	(Monaco) Arthur Leclerc	DAMS	+1.124	16	16
18	9	(United States) Jak Crawford	Hitech Pulse-Eight	+1.154	17	17
19	16	(Israel) Roy Nissany	PHM Racing by Charouz	+1.324	18	18
20	15	(Belgium) Amaury Cordeel	Invicta Virtuosi Racing	+1.357	20	19
21	17	(United States) Brad Benavides	PHM Racing by Charouz	+1.652	21	21
22	20	(Czech Republic) Roman Staněk	Trident	+2.234	22	22

Notes

- ^1 – Juan Manuel Correa was handed a three-place grid penalty for impeding Invicta Virtuosi Racing driver Amaury Cordeel in qualifying.
- ^2 – Clément Novalak was handed a five-place grid penalty for the Feature Race for causing a collision with Ralph Boschung during the Sprint Race.

=== Sprint race ===
Pos.	No.	Driver	Entrant	Laps	Time/Retired	Grid	Points
1	1	(Norway) Dennis Hauger	MP Motorsport	28	44:43.144	2	10
2	11	(Japan) Ayumu Iwasa	DAMS	28	+4.230	5	8 (1)
3	8	(United Kingdom) Oliver Bearman	Prema Racing	28	+14.196	4	6
4	5	(France) Théo Pourchaire	ART Grand Prix	28	+16.592	7	5
5	2	(India) Jehan Daruvala	MP Motorsport	28	+20.760	3	4
6	24	(India) Kush Maini	Campos Racing	28	+24.054	1	3
7	6	(France) Victor Martins	ART Grand Prix	28	+24.388	9	2
8	10	(France) Isack Hadjar	Hitech Pulse-Eight	28	+25.316	6	1
9	7	(Denmark) Frederik Vesti	Prema Racing	28	+25.316	8	
10	14	(Australia) Jack Doohan	Invicta Virtuosi Racing	28	+25.714	10	
11	4	(Brazil) Enzo Fittipaldi	Rodin Carlin	28	+26.060	11	
12	3	(Barbados) Zane Maloney	Rodin Carlin	28	+26.592	14	
13	22	(Netherlands) Richard Verschoor	Van Amersfoort Racing	28	+26.840	12	
14	9	(United States) Jak Crawford	Hitech Pulse-Eight	28	+27.122	17	
15	12	(Monaco) Arthur Leclerc	DAMS	28	+27.486	16	
16	20	(Czech Republic) Roman Staněk	Trident	28	+28.035	22	
17	16	(Israel) Roy Nissany	PHM Racing by Charouz	28	+32.986	18	
18	17	(United States) Brad Benavides	PHM Racing by Charouz	28	+37.389	21	
19	15	(Belgium) Amaury Cordeel	Invicta Virtuosi Racing	28	+38.013	20	
20	23	(United States) Juan Manuel Correa	Van Amersfoort Racing	27	+1 lap	19	
DNF	25	(Switzerland) Ralph Boschung	Campos Racing	11	Collision	13	
DNF	21	(France) Clement Novalak	Trident	11	Collision	15	
Fastest lap set by: (Japan) Ayumu Iwasa - 1:32.585 (Lap 28)

=== Feature race ===
Pos.	No.	Driver	Entrant	Laps	Time/Retired	Grid	Points
1	14	(Australia) Jack Doohan	Invicta Virtuosi Racing	37	57:52.434	1	25 (3)
2	7	(Denmark) Frederik Vesti	Prema Racing	37	+9.110	3	18
3	6	(France) Victor Martins	ART Grand Prix	37	+9.850	2	15
4	11	(Japan) Ayumu Iwasa	DAMS	37	+26.167	6	12
5	10	(France) Isack Hadjar	Hitech Pulse-Eight	37	+27.407	5	10
6	5	(France) Théo Pourchaire	ART Grand Prix	37	+29.529	4	8
7	1	(Norway) Dennis Hauger	MP Motorsport	37	+30.512	9	6
8	4	(Brazil) Enzo Fittipaldi	Rodin Carlin	37	+30.937	11	4
9	23	(United States) Juan Manuel Correa	Van Amersfoort Racing	37	+39.401	15	2
10	22	(Netherlands) Richard Verschoor	Van Amersfoort Racing	37	+39.979	12	1
11	2	(India) Jehan Daruvala	MP Motorsport	37	+41.025	8	
12	8	(United Kingdom) Oliver Bearman	Prema Racing	37	+41.607	7	
13	12	(Monaco) Arthur Leclerc	DAMS	37	+42.064	16	
14	20	(Czech Republic) Roman Staněk	Trident	37	+42.944	22	
15	16	(Israel) Roy Nissany	PHM Racing by Charouz	37	+56.569	18	
16	3	(Barbados) Zane Maloney	Rodin Carlin	37	+60.999	14	
17	9	(United States) Jak Crawford	Hitech Pulse-Eight	37	+62.846	17	
18	17	(United States) Brad Benavides	PHM Racing by Charouz	37	+68.612	21	
19	25	(Switzerland) Ralph Boschung	Campos Racing	37	+74.010	13	
20	24	(India) Kush Maini	Campos Racing	37	+76.994	10	
21	15	(Belgium) Amaury Cordeel	Invicta Virtuosi Racing	36	+1 lap	19	
DNF	21	(France) Clement Novalak	Trident	2	Retired	20	
Fastest lap set by (Australia) Jack Doohan: 1:30.997 (lap 36)

== Standings after the event ==
Drivers' Championship standings

	Pos.	Driver	Points
	1	(Denmark) Frederik Vesti	153
	2	(France) Théo Pourchaire	142
	3	(Japan) Ayumu Iwasa	132
2	4	(France) Victor Martins	105
1	5	(Australia) Jack Doohan	100

Teams' Championship standings

Pos.	Team	Points
1	(Italy) Prema Racing	247
2	(France) ART Grand Prix	247
3	(France) DAMS	171
4	(United Kingdom) Rodin Carlin	138
5	(Netherlands) MP Motorsport	129

- Note: Only the top five positions are included for both sets of standings.

== See also ==
- 2023 Hungarian Grand Prix
- 2023 Budapest Formula 3 round

Previous round: 2023 Silverstone Formula 2 round	FIA Formula 2 Championship; 2023 season	Next round: 2023 Spa-Francorchamps Formula 2 round
Previous round: 2022 Budapest Formula 2 round	Budapest Formula 2 round	Next round: 2024 Budapest Formula 2 round
