= 2022 Spielberg Formula 2 round =

Motor racing competition

(Austria) 2022 Spielberg Formula 2 round
Round details
- Round 8 of 14 in the 2022 FIA Formula 2 Championship.
- Location: Red Bull Ring, Spielberg, Austria
- Course: Permanent racing facility 4.318 km (2.683 mi)

Sprint Race
- Date: 9 July 2022
- Laps: 28
Podium
First	(New Zealand) Marcus Armstrong	Hitech Grand Prix
Second	(France) Théo Pourchaire	ART Grand Prix
Third	(Australia) Jack Doohan	Virtuosi Racing
Fastest lap
Driver	(Brazil) Felipe Drugovich	MP Motorsport
- Time: 1:17.328 (on lap 7)

Feature Race
- Date: 10 July 2022
- Laps: 40
Pole position
Driver	(Denmark) Frederik Vesti	ART Grand Prix
Time	1:14.123	
Podium
First	(United States) Logan Sargeant	Carlin Motorsport
Second	(Brazil) Enzo Fittipaldi	Charouz Racing System
Third	(Spain) Roberto Merhi	Campos Racing
Fastest lap
Driver	(Australia) Jack Doohan	Virtuosi Racing
- Time: 1:16.536 (on lap 39)

The 2022 Spielberg FIA Formula 2 round was a motor racing event held between 8 and 10 July 2022 at the Red Bull Ring, Spielberg, Austria. It was the eighth round of the 2022 FIA Formula 2 Championship and was held in support of the 2022 Austrian Grand Prix.

== Driver changes ==
Prior to the eighth round in Spielberg, Campos Racing announced on 6 July that Roberto Merhi would make his Formula 2 comeback by replacing Swiss driver Ralph Boschung due to the effects of a neck injury sustained at the third round in Imola. At the age of 31 years, Merhi became the oldest driver to compete in a Formula 2 round.

In addition, Van Amersfoort Racing driver Amaury Cordeel made his comeback after his ban in the previous round in Silverstone following the collection of 12 penalty points.

== Classification ==
=== Qualifying ===
Frederik Vesti took his maiden Formula 2 pole position and the first one for ART Grand Prix this season ahead of Jüri Vips and Silverstone feature race winner Logan Sargeant.

Pos.	No.	Driver	Entrant	Time	Grid SR	Grid FR
1	9	(Denmark) Frederik Vesti	ART Grand Prix	1:14.123	10	1
2	8	(Estonia) Jüri Vips	Hitech Grand Prix	+0.035	9	2
3	6	(United States) Logan Sargeant	Carlin	+0.165	8	3
4	17	(Japan) Ayumu Iwasa	DAMS	+0.184	6	4
5	11	(Brazil) Felipe Drugovich	MP Motorsport	+0.192	5	5
6	3	(Australia) Jack Doohan	Virtuosi Racing	+0.195	4	6
7	25	(Belgium) Amaury Cordeel	Van Amersfoort Racing	+0.334	7^{1}	7
8	20	(Netherlands) Richard Verschoor	Trident	+0.445	3	8
9	10	(France) Théo Pourchaire	ART Grand Prix	+0.493	2	9
10	7	(New Zealand) Marcus Armstrong	Hitech Grand Prix	+0.547	1	10
11	2	(India) Jehan Daruvala	Prema Racing	+0.579	11	11
12	22	(Brazil) Enzo Fittipaldi	Charouz Racing System	+0.617	12	12
13	23	(Turkey) Cem Bölükbaşı	Charouz Racing System	+0.642	13	13
14	5	(New Zealand) Liam Lawson	Carlin	+0.669	14	14
15	1	(Norway) Dennis Hauger	Prema Racing	+0.671	15	15
16	21	(Australia) Calan Williams	Trident	+0.713	16	16
17	16	(Israel) Roy Nissany	DAMS	+0.772	22^{2}	17
18	4	(Japan) Marino Sato	Virtuosi Racing	+0.813	17	18
19	24	(United Kingdom) Jake Hughes	Van Amersfoort Racing	+0.882	18	19
20	12	(France) Clément Novalak	MP Motorsport	+1.000	19	20
21	15	(Spain) Roberto Merhi	Campos Racing	+1.077	20	21
22	14	(United Kingdom) Olli Caldwell	Campos Racing	+1.533	21	22

Notes:

- ^1 – Amaury Cordeel originally qualified fourth for the Sprint Race, but was given a three-place grid penalty for causing a collision with Olli Caldwell at his latest round's Feature Race in Baku, which resulted in both drivers prematurely ending the race.
- ^2 – Roy Nissany originally qualified seventeenth for the Sprint Race, but was given a five-place grid penalty for causing a collision with Dennis Hauger at the previous round's Feature Race in Silverstone, which resulted in both drivers prematurely ending the race.

=== Sprint race ===
Pos.	No.	Driver	Entrant	Laps	Time/Retired	Grid	Points
1	7	(New Zealand) Marcus Armstrong	Hitech Grand Prix	28	36:38.856	1	10
2	10	(France) Théo Pourchaire	ART Grand Prix	28	+1.098	2	8
3	3	(Australia) Jack Doohan	Virtuosi Racing	28	+2.169	4	6
4	11	(Brazil) Felipe Drugovich	MP Motorsport	28	+5.053	5	5 (1)
5	8	(Estonia) Jüri Vips	Hitech Grand Prix	28	+11.972	9	4
6	20	(Netherlands) Richard Verschoor	Trident	28	+14.832	3	3
7	6	(United States) Logan Sargeant	Carlin	28	+15.291	8	2
8	22	(Brazil) Enzo Fittipaldi	Charouz Racing System	28	+17.538	12	1
9	1	(Norway) Dennis Hauger	Prema Racing	28	+19.337	15	
10	17	(Japan) Ayumu Iwasa	DAMS	28	+20.891^{3}	6	
11	2	(India) Jehan Daruvala	Prema Racing	28	+21.644	11	
12	9	(Denmark) Frederik Vesti	ART Grand Prix	28	+22.036^{1}	10	
13	16	(Israel) Roy Nissany	DAMS	28	+31.700	22	
14	21	(Australia) Calan Williams	Trident	28	+34.565	16	
15	12	(France) Clément Novalak	MP Motorsport	28	+38.673	19	
16	24	(United Kingdom) Jake Hughes	Van Amersfoort Racing	28	+40.245	18	
17	14	(United Kingdom) Olli Caldwell	Campos Racing	28	+53.559^{1}	21	
18	25	(Belgium) Amaury Cordeel	Van Amersfoort Racing	28	+1:10.121^{1} ^{4}	7	
19†	15	(Spain) Roberto Merhi	Campos Racing	26	Mechanical	20	
DNF	23	(Turkey) Cem Bölükbaşı	Charouz Racing System	23	Mechanical	13	
DNF	5	(New Zealand) Liam Lawson	Carlin	11	Gearbox	PL^{2}	
DNF	4	(Japan) Marino Sato	Virtuosi Racing	2	Electronics	17	
Fastest lap set by (Brazil) Felipe Drugovich: 1:17.328 (lap 9)

Notes:

- ^1 – Frederik Vesti, Amaury Cordeel and Olli Caldwell all received a five-second time-penalty for repeatedly exceeding track limits.
- ^2 – Liam Lawson was due to start from fourteenth place, but stalled on the grid and was forced to start from pit lane. Thus, his place at the starting grid was left vacant.
- ^3 – Ayumu Iwasa received a five-second time-penalty for forcing Logan Sargeant off track.
- ^4 – Amaury Cordeel received a thirty-second time-penalty for overtaking under double-yellow flags.

=== Feature race ===
Pos.	No.	Driver	Entrant	Laps	Time/Retired	Grid	Points
1	6	(United States) Logan Sargeant	Carlin	40	55:44.500	3	25
2	22	(Brazil) Enzo Fittipaldi	Charouz Racing System	40	+0.514	12	18
3	15	(Spain) Roberto Merhi	Campos Racing	40	+1.618^{1}	21	15
4	1	(Norway) Dennis Hauger	Prema Racing	40	+5.999	15	12
5	24	(United Kingdom) Jake Hughes	Van Amersfoort Racing	40	+10.137	19	10
6	14	(United Kingdom) Olli Caldwell	Campos Racing	40	+12.152	22	8
7	17	(Japan) Ayumu Iwasa	DAMS	40	+13.145^{1}	4	6
8	8	(Estonia) Jüri Vips	Hitech Grand Prix	40	+13.872	2	4
9	16	(Israel) Roy Nissany	DAMS	40	+14.442	17	2
10	5	(New Zealand) Liam Lawson	Carlin	40	+15.964^{2}	14	1
11	11	(Brazil) Felipe Drugovich	MP Motorsport	40	+19.006	5	
12	2	(India) Jehan Daruvala	Prema Racing	40	+19.635^{5}	11	
13	10	(France) Théo Pourchaire	ART Grand Prix	40	+19.842	9	
14	9	(Denmark) Frederik Vesti	ART Grand Prix	40	+26.760^{2} ^{3}	1	(2)
15	21	(Australia) Calan Williams	Trident	40	+28.949^{1}	16	
16	4	(Japan) Marino Sato	Virtuosi Racing	40	+32.056	18	
17	12	(France) Clément Novalak	MP Motorsport	40	+58.606	20	
18	25	(Belgium) Amaury Cordeel	Van Amersfoort Racing	39	+1 lap	7	
19	3	(Australia) Jack Doohan	Virtuosi Racing	39	+1 lap	6	
DNF	23	(Turkey) Cem Bölükbaşı	Charouz Racing System	3	Collision damage	13	
DNF	7	(New Zealand) Marcus Armstrong	Hitech Grand Prix	0	Spin/Collision	10	
DSQ	20	(Netherlands) Richard Verschoor	Trident	40	~~(55:30.399)~~^{4}	8	
Fastest lap set by (Australia) Jack Doohan: 1:16.536 (lap 39)

Notes:

- ^1 – Roberto Merhi, Ayumu Iwasa and Calan Williams all received a five-second time-penalty for repeatedly exceeding track limits.
- ^2 – Liam Lawson and Frederik Vesti received a fifteen-second time-penalty for repeatedly exceeding track limits.
- ^3 – Frederik Vesti received a five-second time-penalty for overtaking Olli Caldwell off the track.
- ^4 – Richard Verschoor finished first on track, but was disqualified for failing to provide a sufficient fuel sample after the race.
- ^5 – Jehan Daruvala received a twenty-second time-penalty after his team attempted to dry the track surface at his grid slot before the race.

== Standings after the event ==
Drivers' Championship standings

	Pos.	Driver	Points
	1	(Brazil) Felipe Drugovich	154
1	2	(United States) Logan Sargeant	115
1	3	(France) Théo Pourchaire	114
	4	(India) Jehan Daruvala	80
4	5	(Brazil) Enzo Fittipaldi	75

Teams' Championship standings

	Pos.	Team	Points
	1	(Netherlands) MP Motorsport	176
1	2	(United Kingdom) Carlin	175
1	3	(France) ART Grand Prix	170
	4	(Italy) Prema Racing	147
	5	(United Kingdom) Hitech Grand Prix	136

- Note: Only the top five positions are included for both sets of standings.

== See also ==
- 2022 Austrian Grand Prix
- 2022 Spielberg Formula 3 round

Previous round: 2022 Silverstone Formula 2 round	FIA Formula 2 Championship; 2022 season	Next round: 2022 Le Castellet Formula 2 round
Previous round: 2020 2nd Spielberg Formula 2 round	Spielberg Formula 2 round	Next round: 2023 Spielberg Formula 2 round
