= Clément Novalak =

French and Swiss racing driver (born 2000)

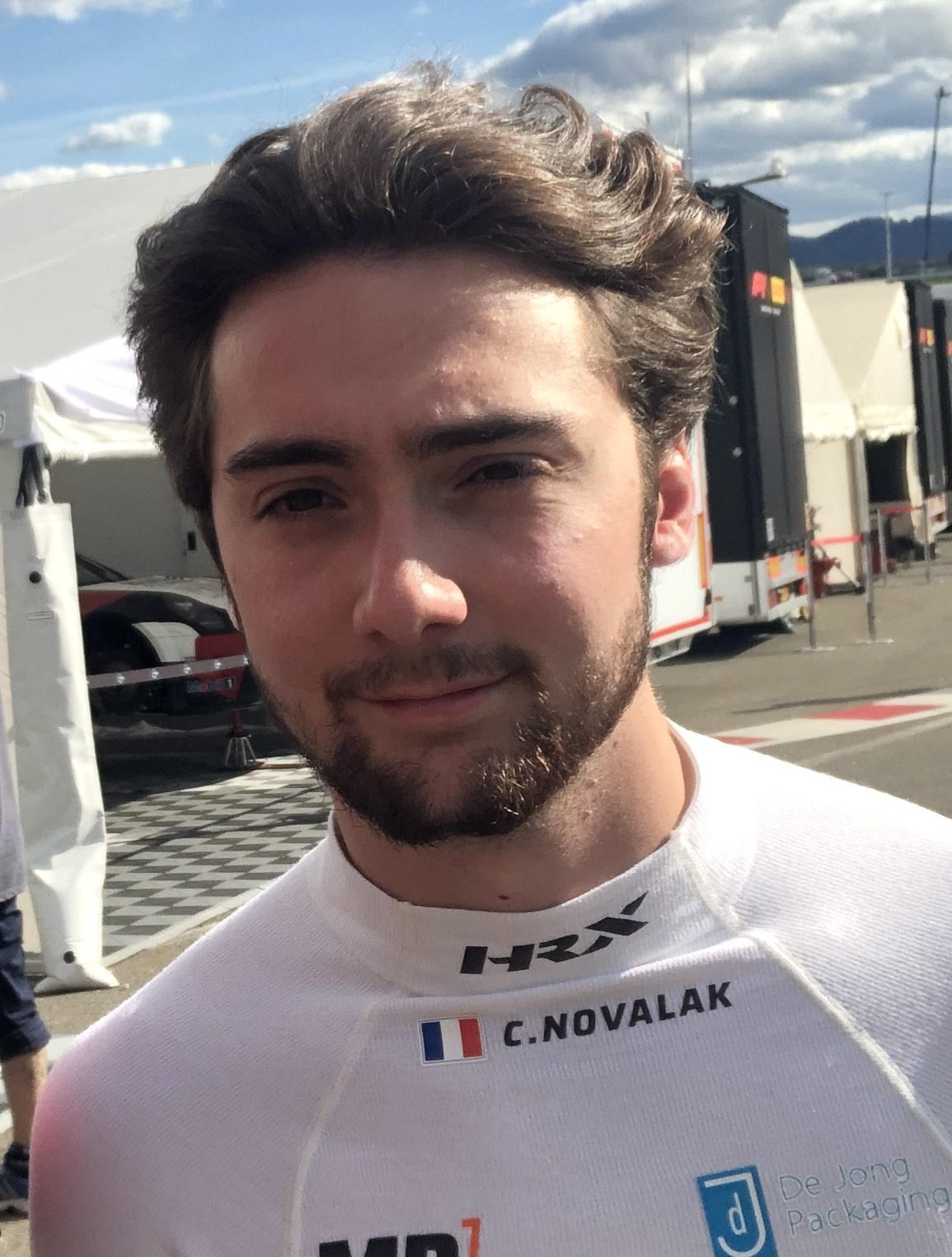
- Novalak in 2022
- Nationality: (France) French; (Switzerland) Swiss; via dual nationality
- Born: 23 December 2000 (age 25) Avignon, France

European Le Mans Series career
- Debut season: 2024
- Current team: TDS Racing
- Categorisation: FIA Gold
- Car number: 29
- Starts: 12 (12 entries)
- Wins: 1
- Podiums: 4
- Poles: 0
- Fastest laps: 0
- Best finish: 3rd in 2025 (LMP2 Pro-Am)

Previous series
- 2021–2023 2020–2021 2018–2019 2018 2018 2018: FIA Formula 2 Championship; FIA Formula 3 BRDC British Formula 3 Championship; Formula Renault NEC; Formula Renault Eurocup; Toyota Racing Series

Championship titles
- 2019: BRDC British Formula 3 Championship

Clément Novalak (French pronunciation: [kle.mɑ̃ nɔ.va.lak]; born 23 December 2000) is a French and Swiss racing driver who last competed in the European Le Mans Series for TDS Racing.

Novalak won the BRDC British Formula 3 Championship with Carlin in 2019.

== Junior racing career ==
=== Karting ===
Novalak started karting in France when he was ten years old. He won a couple of championships, his first of which was in 2015 at the WSK Super Master Series. He competed all around Europe including France, Sweden, Italy and the UK. In 2014, Novalak received backing from former karting champion and Hitech Grand Prix founder Oliver Oakes.

=== Toyota Racing Series ===
In 2018, Novalak made his single-seater debut in the championship with Giles Motorsport. Claiming two wins at Teretonga and Hampton Downs saw him end the season fifth and as top rookie.

=== Formula Renault Eurocup ===
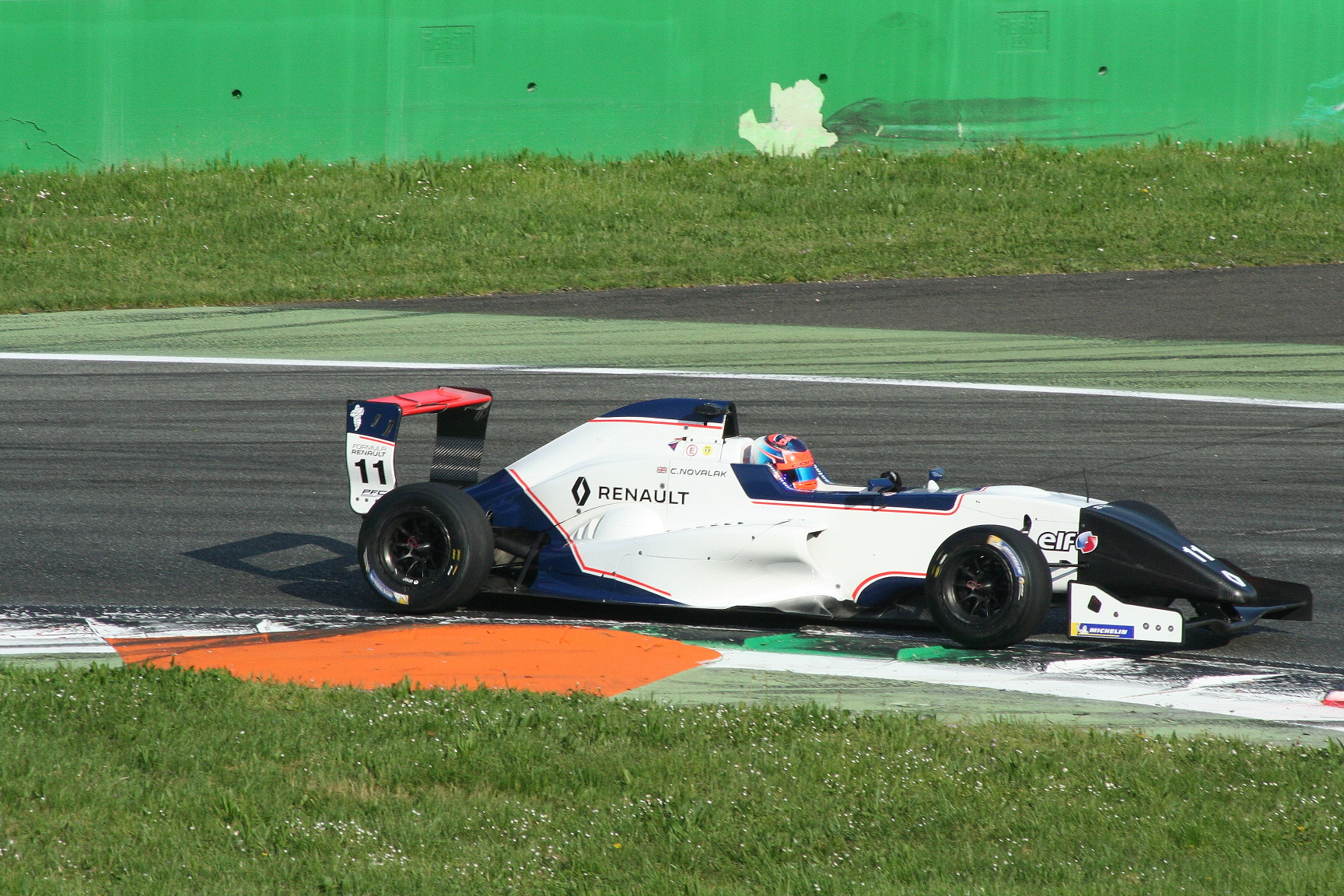
Novalak racing in the 2018 Formula Renault Eurocup

Following his performance in the Toyota Racing Series, Novalak was signed to Josef Kaufmann Racing for the 2018 season.

=== British Formula 3 ===
Novalak's first season in British F3 was in 2018 with Carlin. The first race of the season he took pole at Oulton Park, however he would retire from the race. Novalak competed in four of the eight rounds in that season with the best finish being fourth, he finished the season in 18th with 120 points, only two points behind the Swede Arvin Esmaeili who had a full-time drive.

In 2019, Novalak got a full-time drive with Carlin. He got two poles and two wins, in the second race of the final round of the season himself and championship rival Johnathan Hoggard collided meaning they both finished at the bottom end of the points. Hoggard finished 15th whereas Novalak finished 12th which gave him four points, enough to win him the title despite Hoggard winning the final race.

=== FIA Formula 3 Championship ===
==== 2020 ====
Following his British F3 title win, Novalak joined Carlin for the second and third days of the post-season test at Valencia. In February 2020, Novalak was named as part of Carlin's lineup for the 2020 season, which includes him, Cameron Das and Enaam Ahmed. He scored his first podium in Austria.

==== 2021 ====
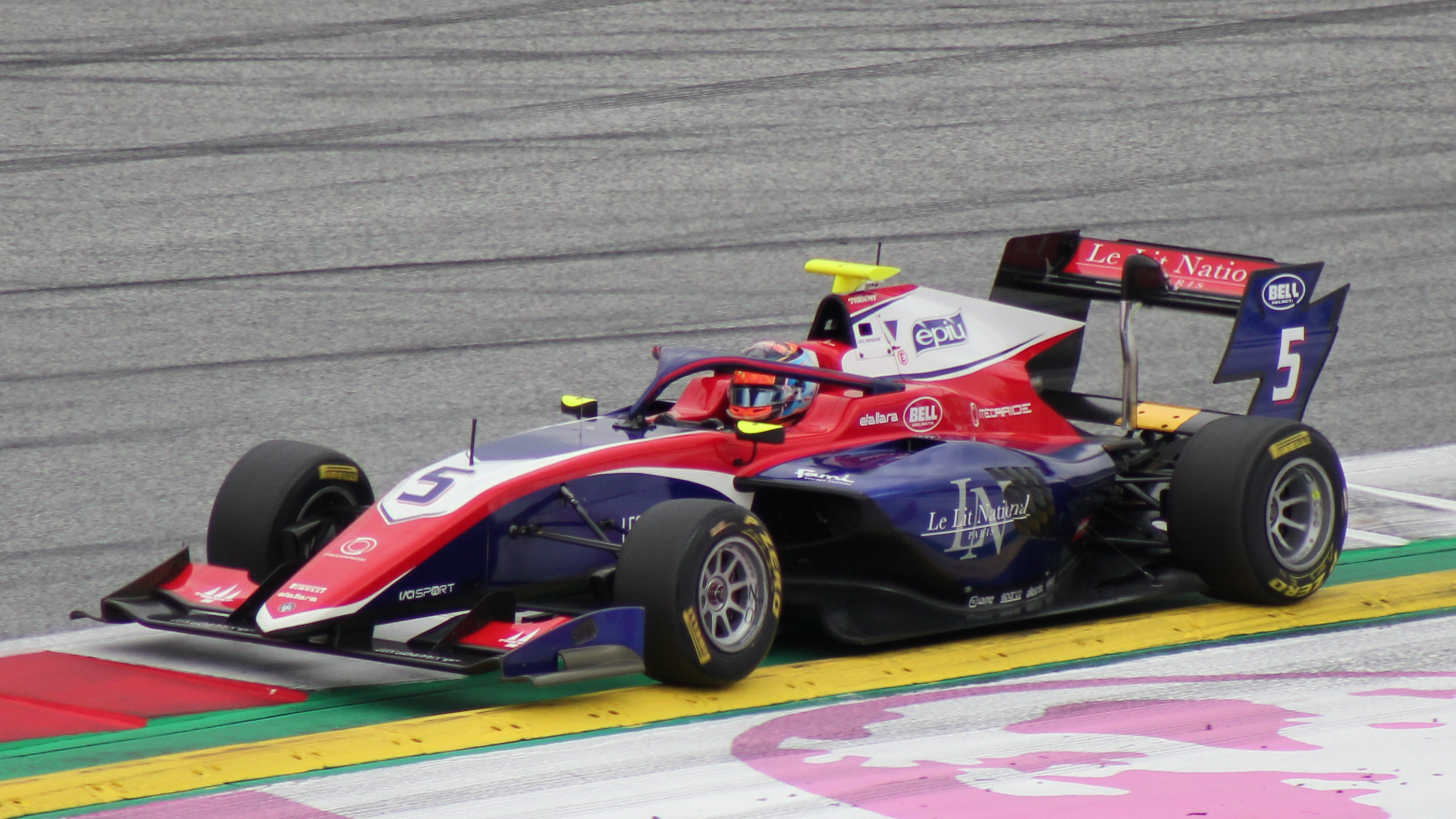
Novalak driving the Dallara F3 2019 during the 2021 Spielberg Formula 3 round

In the post-season test at Catalunya, Novalak joined the Trident outfit and set the fastest time of the second day's morning session. He ended up signing with the team for the 2021 season, driving alongside Jack Doohan and David Schumacher. At the first round in Barcelona, Novalak scored his first podium of the year in Sprint Race 1, finishing second, and would add to his points tally in the remaining two races of the weekend. More points came in all three races at his home circuit, Le Castellet, despite which Novalak commented that consistency was "not good enough" for a title battle. Bad luck befell him in the third event at the Red Bull Ring, where the Frenchman collided with Matteo Nannini whilst battling for the lead in the closing stages of the first sprint race. Another crash, this time caused by Arthur Leclerc, forced Novalak out of the feature race, meaning that he wouldn't score points that round.

At the next two rounds in Budapest and Spa, Novalak scored points in all six races, even managing to set the fastest lap in Sprint Race 2 in the latter event. This would be followed up by a double podium at Zandvoort, with Novalak profiting from a collision between his teammate Schumacher and Victor Martins to take second on Sunday. At the season finale in Sochi, Novalak was embroiled in a battle for the lead with teammate Doohan, as the Australian ignored his team's instructions to let Novalak past, which meant that Doohan won the race, whilst Novalak had to settle for third, having been overtaken by Frederik Vesti near the end of the race. Despite this, Novalak, who ended up third in the drivers' championship, had helped Trident to take the teams' title.

=== FIA Formula 2 Championship ===
==== 2021 ====
During November 2021, MP Motorsport announced that Novalak would replace Lirim Zendeli for the final two races of the 2021 season and contest the full season with them in 2022. His best finish ended up being 14th, which he achieved in three separate races.

==== 2022 ====
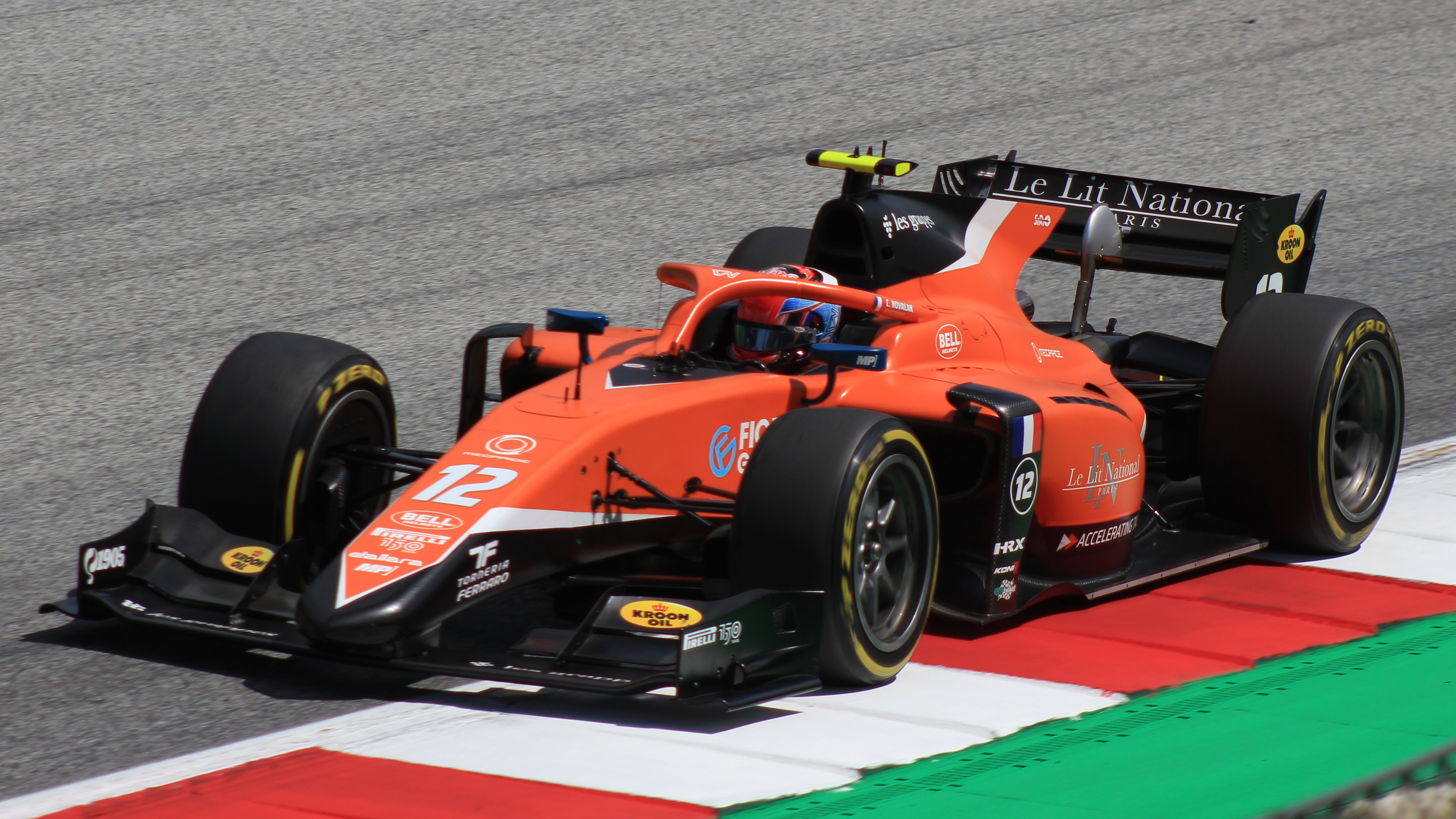
Novalak driving the Dallara F2 2018 during the 2022 Spielberg Formula 2 round.

For the 2022 season, Novalak would be partnered by Felipe Drugovich. He started his season out slowly, having to wait until the round at Imola for his first points in the category. More points would follow in Barcelona, where Novalak took fifth place in the feature race, although this would be his final top-ten finish for the subsequent four rounds. After the summer break, Novalak scored his only podium of the year, finishing second in the sprint race at Zandvoort. He ended his season 14th in the drivers' standings, helping MP to win the teams' title.

==== 2023 ====
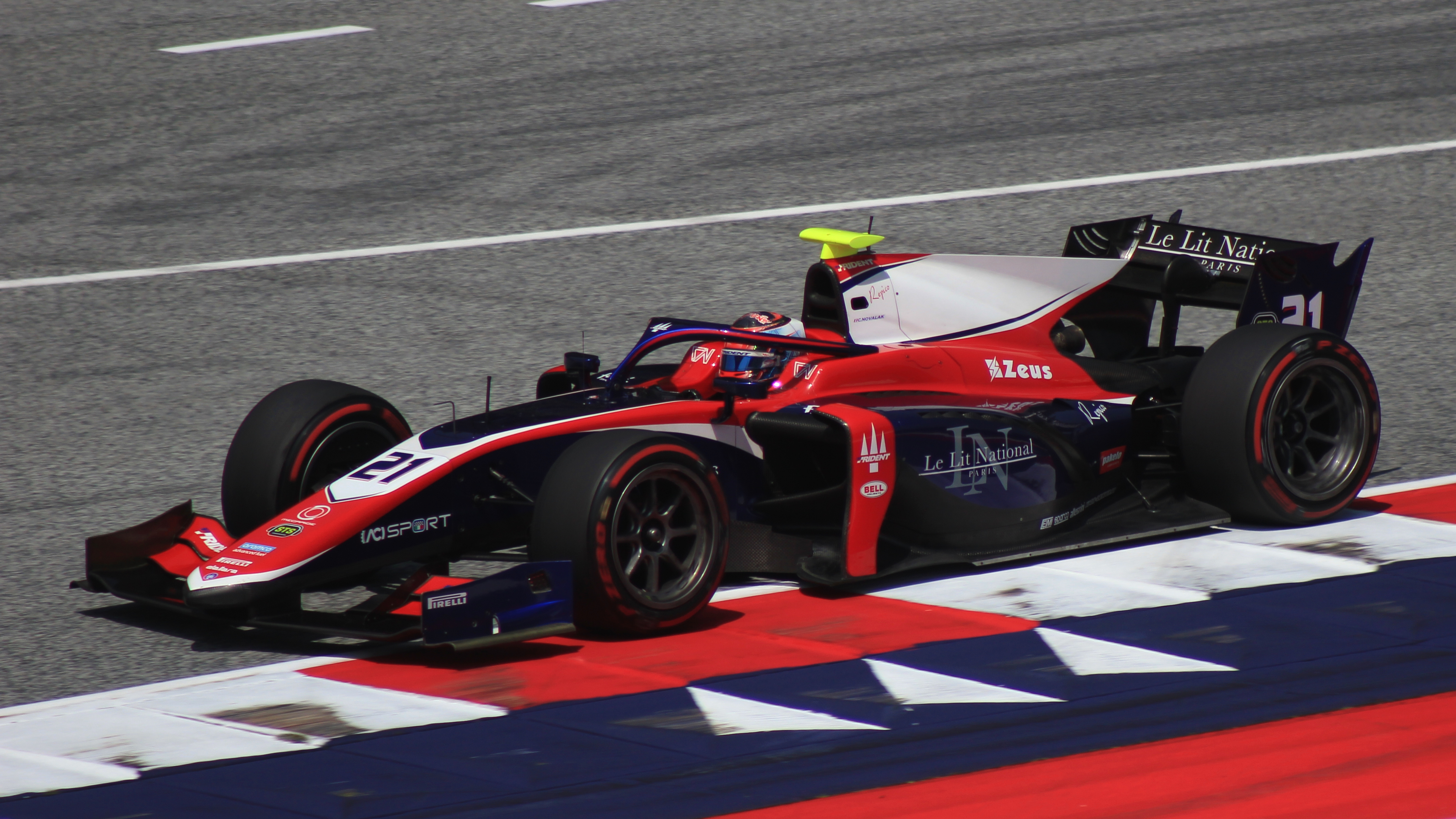
Novalak driving for Trident during the 2023 Spielberg Formula 2 round.

Shortly before the 2022 post-season test, Novalak was announced to be reuniting with Trident for the 2023 season. Partnering him would be Czech rookie Roman Staněk.

The opening three rounds yielded little success, as Novalak continued to struggle in qualifying, leaving him with a best finish of eleventh at Melbourne. Chaos near the end of the Baku sprint race enabled the Frenchman to score his first points, which he described as a relief, whilst also stating that it had been "a weekend of what could have been" due to his starting spot of 19th. Top-ten finishes eluded Novalak during the subsequent rounds, although the round in Austria brought a highlight: despite qualifying in 20th, a decision to start on dry tyres benefited Novalak, who was able to gain a heap of positions on a drying track, leading him on to finish third. However, post-race inspections found that the car's rear tyre pressures were below the legal limit, forcing the race officials to disqualify Novalak.

Three further events without points followed, including a mistake at Budapest, where Novalak lost control under breaking during Saturday's sprint race and collided into Ralph Boschung, earning himself a five-place grid penalty. In Zandvoort, Novalak ended up with a starting spot of 13th after bringing the qualifying session to an early end, having hit the barrier on the exit of turn three. On Sunday, the seas parted for the French driver, who found himself in the lead, having stopped shortly before a safety car intervention. He would hold off Zane Maloney for the remainder of the contest, creating a gap before taking his maiden win in Formula 2.

Novalak left Trident prior to the season finale at Yas Marina and was replaced by Formula 3 graduate Paul Aron.

=== Formula One ===
In 2017, Novalak partook in an assessment with the Ferrari Driver Academy.

== Endurance racing career ==
In November 2023, Novalak participated in the WEC rookie test at the Bahrain International Circuit, testing an LMP2 car with Inter Europol Competition.

=== 2024 ===
The following month, Novalak was announced to be contesting the full European Le Mans Series season with the team for 2024, as well as making his endurance racing debut for Inter Europol at the 24 Hours of Daytona in January 2024.

== Personal life ==
Novalak was born in the French city of Avignon to a French father and Swiss mother. He moved to Montreux in Switzerland as a child and again to Hertfordshire in the United Kingdom in his teens. He claimed in a 2020 interview that, similar to Bertrand Gachot, "...I would probably consider myself European nowadays." In 2021, he raced under a French license as he stated that his "origins are French" and despite him "[not having] lived there a lot [he] was born there and each time [he] took a train or a plane in France, [he felt] at home."

Novalak's father, who had introduced him to motorsport, died in 2017, as a result of which the Frenchman added his father's birthday to his helmet in Roman numerals.

== Karting record ==
=== Karting career summary ===
Season	Series	Team	Position
2011	Championnat Regional Rhone-Alpes — Minime		13th
2011	Bridgestone Cup — Minime		23rd
2011	French Championship — Minime		64th
2012	Trophée Oscar Petit — Minime		2nd
2012	Championnat Regional PACAC — Minime		10th
2012	Championnat Regional Rhone-Alpes — Minime		5th
2012	Bridgestone Cup — Minime		9th
2012	Trophée Kart Mag — Minime		1st
2012	French Championship — Minime		9th
2012	Regional Series — Minime		7th
2013	Rotax Winter Cup — Rotax Junior		30th
2013	Trophée Oscar Petit — Nationale		10th
2013	Rotax Euro Challenge — Rotax Junior		62nd
2013	Challenge Rotax Max France — Cadet		14th
2013	Coupe de France — Cadet		8th
2014	South Garda Winter Cup — KFJ	Kosmic Racing Departement	16th
2014	WSK Champions Cup — KFJ	Kosmic Racing Departement	44th
2014	WSK Super Master Series — KFJ	Kosmic Racing Departement	33rd
2014	CIK-FIA European Championship — KFJ	Kosmic Racing Departement	39th
2014	CIK-FIA World Championship — KFJ	Kosmic Racing Departement	33rd
2014	WSK Final Cup — KFJ	Kosmic Racing Departement	29th
2015	WSK Champions Cup — KFJ	Tony Kart Racing Team	8th
2015	South Garda Winter Cup — KFJ	Tony Kart Racing Team	5th
2015	WSK Super Master Series — KFJ	Tony Kart Racing Team	1st
2015	CIK-FIA European Championship — KFJ	Tony Kart Racing Team	5th
2015	CIK-FIA World Championship — KFJ	Tony Kart Racing Team	2nd
2015	WSK Final Cup — KFJ	Tony Kart Racing Team	33rd
2015	SKUSA SuperNationals — Junior	Team Koene USA	40th
2016	WSK Champions Cup — OK	Tony Kart Racing Team	31st
2016	South Garda Winter Cup — OK	Tony Kart Racing Team	26th
2016	WSK Super Master Series — OK	Tony Kart Racing Team	6th
2016	CIK-FIA European Championship — OK	Tony Kart Racing Team	8th
2016	German Karting Championship — OK	Tony Kart Racing Team	4th
2016	WSK Final Cup — OK	Tony Kart Racing Team	6th
2016	CIK-FIA World Championship — OK	Tony Kart Racing Team	15th
2016	Kartmasters Grand Prix — OK		2nd
2017	WSK Champions Cup — OK	Tony Kart Racing Team	4th
2017	South Garda Winter Cup — OK	Tony Kart Racing Team	7th
2017	WSK Super Master Series — OK	Tony Kart Racing Team	1st
2017	CIK-FIA European Championship — OK	Tony Kart Racing Team	12th
2017	CIK-FIA World Championship — OK	Tony Kart Racing Team	20th
2017	Swedish Karting Championship — OK	Ward Racing	3rd

== Racing record ==
=== Racing career summary ===
Season	Series	Team	Races	Wins	Poles	F/Laps	Podiums	Points	Position
2018	Formula Renault Eurocup	Josef Kaufmann Racing	17	0	0	0	0	0	23rd
2018	Formula Renault NEC	Josef Kaufmann Racing	6	0	0	0	0	0	NC†
2018	BRDC British Formula 3 Championship	Carlin	11	0	1	0	0	120	18th
2018	Toyota Racing Series	Giles Motorsport	15	2	1	3	4	711	5th
2019	BRDC British Formula 3 Championship	Carlin	24	2	2	1	8	505	**1st**
2020	FIA Formula 3 Championship	Carlin Buzz Racing	18	0	0	2	2	45	12th
2021	FIA Formula 3 Championship	Trident	20	0	0	2	4	147	**3rd**
2021	FIA Formula 2 Championship	MP Motorsport	6	0	0	0	0	0	28th
2022	FIA Formula 2 Championship	MP Motorsport	28	0	0	1	1	40	14th
2023	FIA Formula 2 Championship	Trident	24	1	0	2	1	28	17th
2024	European Le Mans Series - LMP2	Inter Europol Competition	6	0	0	0	1	47	7th
2024	24 Hours of Le Mans - LMP2	Inter Europol Competition	1	0	0	0	1	N/A	**2nd**
2025	European Le Mans Series - LMP2 Pro-Am	TDS Racing	6	1	0	0	3	89	**3rd**
2025	24 Hours of Le Mans - LMP2 Pro-Am	TDS Racing	1	0	0	0	1	N/A	**2nd**

^{†} As Novalak was a guest driver, he was ineligible for points.

=== Complete Toyota Racing Series results ===
(key) (Races in bold indicate pole position) (Races in italics indicate fastest lap)

Year	Team	1	2	3	4	5	6	7	8	9	10	11	12	13	14	15	DC	Points
2018	Giles Motorsport	RUA; 1; 4	RUA; 2; 10	RUA; 3; 6	**TER**; **1**; 4	TER; 2; 5	TER; 3; 1	HMP; 1; 5	HMP; 2; 1	HMP; 3; 9	TAU; 1; 10	TAU; 2; 10	TAU; 3 Ret	MAN; 1; 3	MAN; 2; 2	MAN; 3; 6	5th	711

=== Complete Formula Renault Eurocup results ===
(key) (Races in bold indicate pole position) (Races in italics indicate fastest lap)

Year	Team	1	2	3	4	5	6	7	8	9	10	11	12	13	14	15	16	17	18	19	20	Pos	Points
2018	Josef Kaufmann Racing	LEC; 1; 15	LEC; 2 Ret	MNZ; 1; 16	MNZ; 2 Ret	SIL; 1; 12	SIL; 2 Ret	MON; 1; 25	MON; 2; 22	RBR; 1 Ret	RBR; 2 DNS	SPA; 1	SPA; 2	HUN; 1; 18	HUN; 2; 22	NÜR; 1; 14	NÜR; 2; 16	HOC; 1; 11	HOC; 2; 22	CAT; 1 Ret	CAT; 2; 13	23rd	0

=== Complete Formula Renault Northern European Cup results ===
(key) (Races in bold indicate pole position) (Races in italics indicate fastest lap)

Year	Team	1	2	3	4	5	6	7	8	9	10	11	12	DC	Points
2018	Josef Kaufmann Racing	PAU; 1	PAU; 2	MNZ; 1	MNZ; 2	SPA; 1	SPA; 2	HUN; 1; 18	HUN; 2; 22	NÜR; 1; 14	NÜR; 2; 16	HOC; 1; 11	HOC; 2; 22	NC†	0

^{†} As Novalak was a guest driver, he was ineligible to score points.

=== Complete BRDC British Formula 3 Championship results ===
(key) (Races in bold indicate pole position) (Races in italics indicate fastest lap)

Year	Team	1	2	3	4	5	6	7	8	9	10	11	12	13	14	15	16	17	18	19	20	21	22	23	24	Pos	Points
2018	Carlin	**OUL**; **1** Ret	OUL; 2; 7^{10}	OUL; 3; 4	ROC; 1 Ret	ROC; 2; 9^{6}	ROC; 3 DSQ	SNE; 1	SNE; 2	SNE; 3	SIL; 1; 4	SIL; 2; 11^{3}	SIL; 3; 6	SPA; 1	SPA; 2	SPA; 3	BRH; 1	BRH; 2	BRH; 3	DON; 1	DON; 2	DON; 3	SIL; 1; 13	SIL; 2; 4	SIL; 3 C	18th	120
2019	Carlin	OUL; 1; 1	OUL; 2; 6^{7}	OUL; 3; 2	**SNE**; **1**; 2	SNE; 2; 6^{9}	SNE; 3; 2	**SIL1**; **1**; 1	SIL1; 2; 9^{9}	SIL1; 3; 6	DON1; 1; 4	DON1; 2; 4^{7}	DON1; 3; 4	SPA; 1; 4	SPA; 2; 10^{5}	SPA; 3; 2	BRH; 1; 3	BRH; 2; 9^{5}	BRH; 3; 4	SIL2; 1; 7	SIL2; 2; 3^{6}	SIL2; 3; 4	DON2; 1; 4	DON2; 2; 12	DON2; 3; 6	1st	505

=== Complete FIA Formula 3 Championship results ===
(key) (Races in bold indicate pole position points; races in italics indicate points for the fastest lap of top ten finishers)

Year	Entrant	1	2	3	4	5	6	7	8	9	10	11	12	13	14	15	16	17	18	19	20	21	DC	Points
2020	Carlin Buzz Racing	RBR; FEA; 10	RBR; SPR; 3	RBR; FEA; 29	RBR; SPR; 25	HUN; FEA; 9	HUN; SPR; 12	SIL; FEA; 8	SIL; SPR; 2	SIL; FEA; 12	SIL; SPR; 9	CAT; FEA; 4	CAT; SPR; 11	SPA; FEA; NC	SPA; SPR; 15	MNZ; FEA; 13	MNZ; SPR; Ret	MUG; FEA; 24	MUG; SPR; 14				12th	45
2021	Trident	CAT; 1; 2	CAT; 2; 4	CAT; 3; 6	LEC; 1; 5	LEC; 2; 6	LEC; 3; 5	RBR; 1 Ret	RBR; 2; 13	RBR; 3 Ret	HUN; 1; 4	HUN; 2; 8	HUN; 3; 5	SPA; 1; 7	SPA; 2; 5	SPA; 3; 5	ZAN; 1; 11	ZAN; 2; 2	ZAN; 3; 2	SOC; 1; 4	SOC; 2 C	SOC; 3; 3	3rd	147

=== Complete FIA Formula 2 Championship results ===
(key) (Races in bold indicate pole position) (Races in italics indicate points for the fastest lap of top ten finishers)

Year	Entrant	1	2	3	4	5	6	7	8	9	10	11	12	13	14	15	16	17	18	19	20	21	22	23	24	25	26	27	28	DC	Points
2021	MP Motorsport	BHR; SP1	BHR; SP2	BHR; FEA	MCO; SP1	MCO; SP2	MCO; FEA	BAK; SP1	BAK; SP2	BAK; FEA	SIL; SP1	SIL; SP2	SIL; FEA	MNZ; SP1	MNZ; SP2	MNZ; FEA	SOC; SP1	SOC; SP2	SOC; FEA	JED; SP1; 14	JED; SP2; Ret	JED; FEA; 19	YMC; SP1; 17	YMC; SP2; 14	YMC; FEA; 14					28th	0
2022	MP Motorsport	BHR; SPR; 18	BHR; FEA; Ret	JED; SPR; 11	JED; FEA; 14	IMO; SPR; 19	IMO; FEA; 4	CAT; SPR; 14	CAT; FEA; 5	MCO; SPR; Ret	MCO; FEA; Ret	BAK; SPR; 14	BAK; FEA; Ret	SIL; SPR; 13	SIL; FEA; 13	RBR; SPR; 15	RBR; FEA; 17	LEC; SPR; 17	LEC; FEA; 8	HUN; SPR; 20	HUN; FEA; 12	SPA; SPR; 17	SPA; FEA; 9	ZAN; SPR; 2	ZAN; FEA; Ret	MNZ; SPR; Ret	MNZ; FEA; 8	YMC; SPR; 14	YMC; FEA; 12	14th	40
2023	Trident	BHR; SPR; 16	BHR; FEA; 13	JED; SPR; 15	JED; FEA; 16	MEL; SPR; 11	MEL; FEA; 11	BAK; SPR; 7	BAK; FEA; 16	MCO; SPR; 17	MCO; FEA; 17	CAT; SPR; 11	CAT; FEA; 21	RBR; SPR; DSQ	RBR; FEA; 13	SIL; SPR; 17	SIL; FEA; 12	HUN; SPR; Ret	HUN; FEA; Ret	SPA; SPR; 17	SPA; FEA; 13	ZAN; SPR; 8	ZAN; FEA; 1	MNZ; SPR; 10	MNZ; FEA; Ret	YMC; SPR	YMC; FEA			17th	28

=== Complete IMSA SportsCar Championship results ===
(key) (Races in bold indicate pole position; races in italics indicate fastest lap)

Year	Team	Class	Make	Engine	1	2	3	4	5	6	7	Rank	Points
2024	Inter Europol by PR1/Mathiasen Motorsports	LMP2	Oreca 07	Gibson GK428 4.2 L V8	DAY; WD	SEB	WGL	MOS	ELK	IMS	PET	NC	0

=== Complete European Le Mans Series results ===
(key) (Races in bold indicate pole position; results in italics indicate fastest lap)

Year	Entrant	Class	Chassis	Engine	1	2	3	4	5	6	Rank	Points
2024	Inter Europol Competition	LMP2	Oreca 07	Gibson GK428 4.2 L V8	CAT; 8	LEC; Ret	IMO; 7	SPA; 4	MUG; 3	ALG; 5	7th	47
2025	TDS Racing	LMP2 Pro-Am	Oreca 07	Gibson GK428 4.2 L V8	CAT; 3	LEC; 3	IMO; 4	SPA; 5	SIL; 4	ALG; 1	3rd	89

=== Complete 24 Hours of Le Mans results ===
Year	Team	Co-drivers	Car	Class	Laps	Pos.	Class pos.
2024	(Poland) Inter Europol Competition	(Grenada) Vladislav Lomko (Poland) Jakub Śmiechowski	Oreca 07-Gibson	LMP2	297	16th	**2nd**
2025	(France) TDS Racing	(Switzerland) Mathias Beche (United States) Rodrigo Sales	Oreca 07-Gibson	LMP2	365	22nd	5th
2025	(France) TDS Racing	(Switzerland) Mathias Beche (United States) Rodrigo Sales	Oreca 07-Gibson	LMP2 Pro-Am	365	22nd	**2nd**

Sporting positions
Preceded by Linus Lundqvist	BRDC British Formula 3 Championship; Champion; 2019	Succeeded by Kaylen Frederick
