= 2021 Jeddah Formula 2 round =

Motor racing event

(Saudi Arabia) 2021 Jeddah Formula 2 round
Round details
- Round 7 of 8 in the 2021 FIA Formula 2 Championship.
- Location: Jeddah Corniche Circuit, Jeddah, Saudi Arabia
- Course: Street Circuit; 6.174 km (3.836 mi)

Sprint race 1
- Date: 4 December 2021
- Laps: 20
Podium
| First | (New Zealand) Marcus Armstrong | DAMS |
| Second | (New Zealand) Liam Lawson | Hitech Grand Prix |
| Third | (Estonia) Jüri Vips | Hitech Grand Prix |
Fastest lap
| Driver | (Russia) Robert Shwartzman | Prema Racing |
- Time: 1:44.179 (on lap 20)

Sprint race 2
- Date: 4 December 2021
- Laps: 20
Podium
| First | (Australia) Oscar Piastri | Prema Racing |
| Second | (Netherlands) Bent Viscaal | Trident |
| Third | (Russia) Robert Shwartzman | Prema Racing |
Fastest lap
| Driver | (Australia) Oscar Piastri | Prema Racing |
- Time: 1:43.940 (on lap 17)

Feature race
- Date: 5 December 2021
- Laps: 5
Pole position
| Driver | (Australia) Oscar Piastri | Prema Racing |
| Time | 1:40.878 | |
Podium
| First | (Australia) Oscar Piastri | Prema Racing |
| Second | (Russia) Robert Shwartzman | Prema Racing |
| Third | (Switzerland) Ralph Boschung | Campos Racing |
Fastest lap
| Driver | (Australia) Oscar Piastri | Prema Racing |
- Time: 1:45.326 (on lap 5)

The 2021 Jeddah Formula 2 round was the penultimate race of the 2021 Formula 2 Championship and occurred at the Jeddah Corniche Circuit from 3 to 5 December. It was run in support of the 2021 Saudi Arabian Grand Prix and featured three races. The feature race was marred by the crash between Théo Pourchaire and Enzo Fittipaldi where both were hospitalised.

However, Prema Racing sealed the Teams' Championship after their drivers Oscar Piastri and Robert Shwartzman secured a double win in the Feature Race, making them the first double teams' champion in Formula 2 history.

== Classification ==
=== Qualifying ===
| Pos. | No. | Driver | Team | Time | Gap | Grid |
|---|---|---|---|---|---|---|
| 1 | 2 | (Australia) Oscar Piastri | Prema Racing | 1:40.878 | — | 1 |
| 2 | 1 | (Russia) Robert Shwartzman | Prema Racing | 1:41.043 | +0.165 | 2 |
| 3 | 10 | (France) Théo Pourchaire | ART Grand Prix | 1:41.218 | +0.340 | 3 |
| 4 | 9 | (Denmark) Christian Lundgaard | ART Grand Prix | 1:41.297 | +0.419 | 4 |
| 5 | 4 | (Brazil) Felipe Drugovich | UNI-Virtuosi Racing | 1:41.302 | +0.424 | 5 |
| 6 | 3 | (China) Guanyu Zhou | UNI-Virtuosi Racing | 1:41.350 | +0.472 | 6 |
| 7 | 21 | (Switzerland) Ralph Boschung | Campos Racing | 1:41.532 | +0.654 | 7 |
| 8 | 8 | (Estonia) Jüri Vips | Hitech Grand Prix | 1:41.610 | +0.732 | 8 |
| 9 | 17 | (New Zealand) Marcus Armstrong | DAMS | 1:41.618 | +0.740 | 9 |
| 10 | 7 | (New Zealand) Liam Lawson | Hitech Grand Prix | 1:41.619 | +0.741 | 10 |
| 11 | 6 | (India) Jehan Daruvala | Carlin | 1:41.861 | +0.983 | 11 |
| 12 | 12 | (France) Clément Novalak | MP Motorsport | 1:41.890 | +1.012 | 12 |
| 13 | 5 | (United Kingdom) Dan Ticktum | Carlin | 1:41.960 | +1.082 | 13 |
| 14 | 24 | (Netherlands) Bent Viscaal | Trident | 1:41.972 | +1.094 | 14 |
| 15 | 16 | (Israel) Roy Nissany | DAMS | 1:42.076 | +1.198 | 15 |
| 16 | 11 | (Australia) Jack Doohan | MP Motorsport | 1:42.114 | +1.236 | 16 |
| 17 | 25 | (Japan) Marino Sato | Trident | 1:42.466 | +1.588 | 17 |
| 18 | 14 | (Brazil) Enzo Fittipaldi | Charouz Racing System | 1:42.870 | +1.992 | 18 |
| 19 | 20 | (United Kingdom) Olli Caldwell | Campos Racing | 1:42.919 | +2.041 | 19 |
| 20 | 15 | (Brazil) Guilherme Samaia | Charouz Racing System | 1:43.422 | +2.544 | 20 |
| 21 | 22 | (United States) Logan Sargeant | HWA Racelab | 1:43.481 | +2.603 | 21 |
107% time: 1:47.939
| — | 23 | (Italy) Alessio Deledda | HWA Racelab | No time set | — | 22 |

=== Sprint race 1 ===
| Pos. | No. | Driver | Team | Laps | Time/Retired | Grid | Points |
|---|---|---|---|---|---|---|---|
| 1 | 17 | (New Zealand) Marcus Armstrong | DAMS | 20 | 41:44.102 | 2 | 15 |
| 2 | 7 | (New Zealand) Liam Lawson | Hitech Grand Prix | 20 | +0.563 | 1 | 12 |
| 3 | 8 | (Estonia) Jüri Vips | Hitech Grand Prix | 20 | +2.044 | 3 | 10 |
| 4 | 4 | (Brazil) Felipe Drugovich | UNI-Virtuosi Racing | 20 | +2.826 | 6 | 8 |
| 5 | 1 | (Russia) Robert Shwartzman | Prema Racing | 20 | +8.278 | 9 | 6 (2) |
| 6 | 9 | (Denmark) Christian Lundgaard | ART Grand Prix | 20 | +8.377 | 7 | 4 |
| 7 | 5 | (United Kingdom) Dan Ticktum | Carlin | 20 | +8.452 | 13 | 2 |
| 8 | 2 | (Australia) Oscar Piastri | Prema Racing | 20 | +8.613 | 10 | 1 |
| 9 | 24 | (Netherlands) Bent Viscaal | Trident | 20 | +10.468 | 14 | |
| 10 | 6 | (India) Jehan Daruvala | Carlin | 20 | +10.484^{1} | 11 | |
| 11 | 11 | (Australia) Jack Doohan | MP Motorsport | 20 | +10.566 | 16 | |
| 12 | 14 | (Brazil) Enzo Fittipaldi | Charouz Racing System | 20 | +10.965 | 18 | |
| 13 | 16 | (Israel) Roy Nissany | DAMS | 20 | +12.977 | 15 | |
| 14 | 12 | (France) Clément Novalak | MP Motorsport | 20 | +13.104 | 12 | |
| 15 | 21 | (Switzerland) Ralph Boschung | Campos Racing | 20 | +14.332 | 4 | |
| 16 | 22 | (United States) Logan Sargeant | HWA Racelab | 20 | +15.308 | 21 | |
| 17 | 3 | (China) Guanyu Zhou | UNI-Virtuosi Racing | 20 | +17.343 | 5 | |
| 18 | 20 | (United Kingdom) Olli Caldwell | Campos Racing | 20 | +24.652^{2} | 19 | |
| DNF | 10 | (France) Théo Pourchaire | ART Grand Prix | 13 | Accident | 8 | |
| DNF | 23 | (Italy) Alessio Deledda | HWA Racelab | 13 | Mechanical | 22 | |
| DNF | 25 | (Japan) Marino Sato | Trident | 0 | Collision | 17 | |
| DNF | 15 | (Brazil) Guilherme Samaia | Charouz Racing System | 0 | Collision | 20 | |
Fastest lap： (Russia) Robert Shwartzman − Prema Racing − 1:44.179 (lap 20)

Notes：

- ^1 - Jehan Daruvala originally finished the race in fifth place, but was awarded a five-second time penalty for gaining a lasting advantage by going off the track when overtaking his teammate Dan Ticktum. Thus, he was classified tenth.
- ^2 - Olli Caldwell was given a ten-second time penalty for colliding with Marino Sato and Guilherme Samaia on lap 1, which dropped him from 16th to 18th.

=== Sprint race 2 ===
| Pos. | No. | Driver | Team | Laps | Time/Retired | Grid | Points |
|---|---|---|---|---|---|---|---|
| 1 | 2 | (Australia) Oscar Piastri | Prema Racing | 20 | 45:31.603 | 3 | 15 (2) |
| 2 | 24 | (Netherlands) Bent Viscaal | Trident | 20 | +2.521 | 2 | 12 |
| 3 | 1 | (Russia) Robert Shwartzman | Prema Racing | 20 | +3.371 | 6 | 10 |
| 4 | 5 | (United Kingdom) Dan Ticktum | Carlin | 20 | +3.454 | 4 | 8 |
| 5 | 11 | (Australia) Jack Doohan | MP Motorsport | 20 | +3.598 | 11 | 6 |
| 6 | 10 | (France) Théo Pourchaire | ART Grand Prix | 20 | +3.661 | 19 | 4 |
| 7 | 14 | (Brazil) Enzo Fittipaldi | Charouz Racing System | 20 | +3.879 | 12 | 2 |
| 8 | 3 | (China) Guanyu Zhou | UNI-Virtuosi Racing | 20 | +4.128 | 17 | 1 |
| 9 | 21 | (Switzerland) Ralph Boschung | Campos Racing | 20 | +4.351 | 15 | |
| 10 | 4 | (Brazil) Felipe Drugovich | UNI-Virtuosi Racing | 20 | +4.619 | 7 | |
| 11 | 16 | (Israel) Roy Nissany | DAMS | 20 | +4.813 | 13 | |
| 12 | 20 | (United Kingdom) Olli Caldwell | Campos Racing | 20 | +6.148 | 18 | |
| 13 | 25 | (Japan) Marino Sato | Trident | 20 | +6.449 | 21 | |
| 14 | 6 | (India) Jehan Daruvala | Carlin | 20 | +7.003^{1} | 1 | |
| 15 | 9 | (Denmark) Christian Lundgaard | ART Grand Prix | 20 | +7.243^{2} | 5 | |
| DNF | 7 | (New Zealand) Liam Lawson | Hitech Grand Prix | 17 | Accident | 9 | |
| DNF | 8 | (Estonia) Jüri Vips | Hitech Grand Prix | 5 | Collision | 8 | |
| DNF | 22 | (United States) Logan Sargeant | HWA Racelab | 5 | Mechanical | 16 | |
| DNF | 17 | (New Zealand) Marcus Armstrong | DAMS | 0 | Collision | 10 | |
| DNF | 12 | (France) Clément Novalak | MP Motorsport | 0 | Collision | 14 | |
| DNF | 23 | (Italy) Alessio Deledda | HWA Racelab | 0 | Collision | 20 | |
| DNF | 15 | (Brazil) Guilherme Samaia | Charouz Racing System | 0 | Collision | 22 | |
Fastest lap： (Australia) Oscar Piastri − Prema Racing − 1:43.940 (lap 17)

Notes：

- ^1 - Jehan Daruvala received a five-second time penalty for gaining a lasting advantage by shortcutting turn one when he was defending against Oscar Piastri, thus dropping him down from second to 14th.
- ^2 - Christian Lundgaard got a five-second time penalty for gaining an advantage by shortcutting the first corner when overtaking Bent Viscaal, which dropped him from third to 15th.

=== Feature race ===
| Pos. | No. | Driver | Team | Laps | Time/Retired | Grid | Points |
|---|---|---|---|---|---|---|---|
| 1 | 2 | (Australia) Oscar Piastri | Prema Racing | 5 | 47:09.339 | 1 | 12.5 (5) |
| 2 | 1 | (Russia) Robert Shwartzman | Prema Racing | 5 | +1.148 | 2 | 9 |
| 3 | 21 | (Switzerland) Ralph Boschung | Campos Racing | 5 | +2.757 | 7 | 7.5 |
| 4 | 3 | (China) Guanyu Zhou | UNI-Virtuosi Racing | 5 | +3.020 | 6 | 6 |
| 5 | 4 | (Brazil) Felipe Drugovich | UNI-Virtuosi Racing | 5 | +4.407 | 5 | 5 |
| 6 | 8 | (Estonia) Jüri Vips | Hitech Grand Prix | 5 | +4.871 | 8 | 4 |
| 7 | 9 | (Denmark) Christian Lundgaard | ART Grand Prix | 5 | +6.069 | 4 | 3 |
| 8 | 17 | (New Zealand) Marcus Armstrong | DAMS | 5 | +6.178 | 9 | 2 |
| 9 | 7 | (New Zealand) Liam Lawson | Hitech Grand Prix | 5 | +6.547 | 10 | 1 |
| 10 | 5 | (United Kingdom) Dan Ticktum | Carlin | 5 | +9.434 | 12 | 0.5 |
| 11 | 6 | (India) Jehan Daruvala | Carlin | 5 | +9.593 | 11 | |
| 12 | 24 | (Netherlands) Bent Viscaal | Trident | 5 | +10.177 | 13 | |
| 13 | 11 | (Australia) Jack Doohan | MP Motorsport | 5 | +10.445 | 16 | |
| 14 | 22 | (United States) Logan Sargeant | HWA Racelab | 5 | +12.359 | 21 | |
| 15 | 16 | (Israel) Roy Nissany | DAMS | 5 | +12.740 | 14 | |
| 16 | 20 | (United Kingdom) Olli Caldwell | Campos Racing | 5 | +13.736 | 19 | |
| 17 | 15 | (Brazil) Guilherme Samaia | Charouz Racing System | 5 | +15.494 | 20 | |
| 18 | 25 | (Japan) Marino Sato | Trident | 5 | +16.871 | 17 | |
| 19 | 12 | (France) Clément Novalak | MP Motorsport | 5 | +17.134 | 15^{1} | |
| 20 | 23 | (Italy) Alessio Deledda | HWA Racelab | 5 | +20.776 | 22 | |
| DNF | 10 | (France) Théo Pourchaire | ART Grand Prix | 0 | Stalled/collision | 3 | |
| DNF | 14 | (Brazil) Enzo Fittipaldi | Charouz Racing System | 0 | Collision | 18 | |
Fastest lap： (Australia) Oscar Piastri − Prema Racing − 1:45.326 (lap 5)

Notes：

- Originally scheduled for 28 laps, 5 laps were completed.
- Since 75% of the predetermined distance has not been completed, only half of the points were earned in this race.
- ^1 - Clément Novalak received a three-place grid drop for causing a collision with Marcus Armstrong in sprint race 2.

== Standings after the event ==
Drivers' Championship standings

| | Pos. | Driver | Points |
|---|---|---|---|
| | 1 | (Australia) Oscar Piastri | 213.5 |
| 1 | 2 | (Russia) Robert Shwartzman | 162 |
| 1 | 3 | (China) Guanyu Zhou | 149 |
| | 4 | (United Kingdom) Dan Ticktum | 139.5 |
| | 5 | (France) Théo Pourchaire | 124 |

Teams' Championship standings

| Pos. | Team | Points |
|---|---|---|
| 1 | (Italy) Prema Racing | 375.5 |
| 2 | (United Kingdom) Carlin | 235.5 |
| 3 | (United Kingdom) UNI-Virtuosi Racing | 221 |
| 4 | (United Kingdom) Hitech Grand Prix | 209 |
| 5 | (France) ART Grand Prix | 174 |

- Note: Only the top five positions are included for both sets of standings.
- Note: Bold name includes the Teams' Champion.

== See also ==
- 2021 Saudi Arabian Grand Prix

| Previous round: 2021 Sochi Formula 2 round | FIA Formula 2 Championship; 2021 season | Next round: 2021 Yas Island Formula 2 round |
| Previous round: None | Jeddah Formula 2 round | Next round: 2022 Jeddah Formula 2 round |
