= 2022 Le Castellet Formula 2 round =

Motor racing event

(France) 2022 Le Castellet Formula 2 round
Round details
- Round 9 of 14 in the 2022 FIA Formula 2 Championship.
- Layout of the Circuit Paul Ricard
- Location: Circuit Paul Ricard; Le Castellet, Provence-Alpes-Côte d'Azur, France
- Course: Permanent racing circuit 5.842 km (3.630 mi)

Sprint Race
- Date: 23 July 2022
- Laps: 21
Podium
First	(New Zealand) Liam Lawson	Carlin
Second	(India) Jehan Daruvala	Prema Racing
Third	(Brazil) Felipe Drugovich	MP Motorsport
Fastest lap
Driver	(New Zealand) Liam Lawson	Carlin
- Time: 1:47.984 (on lap 21)

Feature Race
- Date: 24 July 2022
- Laps: 30
Pole position
Driver	(United States) Logan Sargeant	Carlin
Time	1:43.871	
Podium
First	(Japan) Ayumu Iwasa	DAMS
Second	(France) Théo Pourchaire	ART Grand Prix
Third	(Denmark) Frederik Vesti	ART Grand Prix
Fastest lap
Driver	(Brazil) Felipe Drugovich	MP Motorsport
- Time: 1:46.901 (on lap 29)

The 2022 Le Castellet FIA Formula 2 round was a motor racing event held between 22 and 24 July 2022 at the Circuit Paul Ricard, Le Castellet, France. It was the ninth round of the 2022 FIA Formula 2 Championship and was held in support of the 2022 French Grand Prix.

== Driver changes ==
David Beckmann replaced Jake Hughes for the Le Castellet round at Van Amersfoort Racing after Hughes tested positive for COVID-19.

== Classification ==
=== Qualifying ===
Logan Sargeant took his second pole position of the season, beating out DAMS driver Ayumu Iwasa by only 0.006 seconds. Frederik Vesti qualified in P3 for the Feature Race right ahead of championship leader Felipe Drugovich, who later was demoted to sixth after his fastest lap time was deleted due to exceeding track limits.

Pos.	No.	Driver	Entrant	Time	Grid SR	Grid FR
1	6	(United States) Logan Sargeant	Carlin	1:43.871	10	1
2	17	(Japan) Ayumu Iwasa	DAMS	+0.006	9	2
3	9	(Denmark) Frederik Vesti	ART Grand Prix	+0.029	8	3
4	3	(Australia) Jack Doohan	Virtuosi Racing	+0.163	7	4
5	10	(France) Théo Pourchaire	ART Grand Prix	+0.290	6	5
6	11	(Brazil) Felipe Drugovich	MP Motorsport	+0.370	5	6
7	8	(Estonia) Jüri Vips	Hitech Grand Prix	+0.437	4	7
8	7	(New Zealand) Marcus Armstrong	Hitech Grand Prix	+0.506	3	8
9	5	(New Zealand) Liam Lawson	Carlin	+0.612	2	9
10	2	(India) Jehan Daruvala	Prema Racing	+0.755	1	10
11	20	(Netherlands) Richard Verschoor	Trident	+0.887	11	11
12	4	(Japan) Marino Sato	Virtuosi Racing	+0.968	12	12
13	21	(Australia) Calan Williams	Trident	+1.047	13	13
14	22	(Brazil) Enzo Fittipaldi	Charouz Racing System	+1.164	14	14
15	15	(Spain) Roberto Merhi	Campos Racing	+1.230	15	15
16	12	(France) Clément Novalak	MP Motorsport	+1.246	16	16
17	24	(Germany) David Beckmann	Van Amersfoort Racing	+1.432	17	17
18	1	(Norway) Dennis Hauger	Prema Racing	+1.526	18	18
19	25	(Belgium) Amaury Cordeel	Van Amersfoort Racing	+1.634	19	19
20	16	(Israel) Roy Nissany	DAMS	+1.871	22^{1}	20
21	14	(United Kingdom) Olli Caldwell	Campos Racing	+1.872	20	21
22	23	(Turkey) Cem Bölükbaşı	Charouz Racing System	+1.902	21	22

Notes:

- ^1 – Roy Nissany originally qualified twentieth, but will be starting the Sprint Race from the back of the grid due to both re-joining the track in a dangerous manner and impeding Olli Caldwell at Free Practice.

=== Sprint race ===
Pos.	No.	Driver	Entrant	Laps	Time/Retired	Grid	Points
1	5	(New Zealand) Liam Lawson	Carlin	21	41:22.995	2	10 (1)
2	2	(India) Jehan Daruvala	Prema Racing	21	+3.206	1	8
3	11	(Brazil) Felipe Drugovich	MP Motorsport	21	+4.835	5	6
4	3	(Australia) Jack Doohan	Virtuosi Racing	21	+5.709	7	5
5	9	(Denmark) Frederik Vesti	ART Grand Prix	21	+7.948	8	4
6	17	(Japan) Ayumu Iwasa	DAMS	21	+8.260	9	3
7	10	(France) Théo Pourchaire	ART Grand Prix	21	+9.552^{1}	6	2
8	6	(United States) Logan Sargeant	Carlin	21	+9.654	10	1
9	4	(Japan) Marino Sato	Virtuosi Racing	21	+10.586	12	
10	24	(Germany) David Beckmann	Van Amersfoort Racing	21	+10.979	17	
11	8	(Estonia) Jüri Vips	Hitech Grand Prix	21	+12.087^{1}	4	
12	1	(Norway) Dennis Hauger	Prema Racing	21	+12.477	18	
13	21	(Australia) Calan Williams	Trident	21	+12.530	13	
14	7	(New Zealand) Marcus Armstrong	Hitech Grand Prix	21	+14.433^{2}	3	
15	23	(Turkey) Cem Bölükbaşı	Charouz Racing System	21	+15.861	21	
16	16	(Israel) Roy Nissany	DAMS	21	+16.536	22	
17	12	(France) Clément Novalak	MP Motorsport	21	+16.643	16	
18	14	(United Kingdom) Olli Caldwell	Campos Racing	21	+17.338	20	
DNF	15	(Spain) Roberto Merhi	Campos Racing	17	Collision damage	15	
DNF	20	(Netherlands) Richard Verschoor	Trident	16	Engine	11	
DNF	22	(Brazil) Enzo Fittipaldi	Charouz Racing System	8	Collision	14	
DNF	25	(Belgium) Amaury Cordeel	Van Amersfoort Racing	8	Collision damage	19	
Fastest lap set by (New Zealand) Liam Lawson: 1:47.984 (lap 21)

Notes:

- ^1 – Théo Pourchaire and Jüri Vips originally finished third and sixth respectively, but were later given a five-second time-penalty for both forcing Marcus Armstrong off the track.
- ^2 – Marcus Armstrong originally finished ninth, but was later given a five-second time-penalty for causing a collision with Jehan Daruvala.

=== Feature race ===
Pos.	No.	Driver	Entrant	Laps	Time/Retired	Grid	Points
1	17	(Japan) Ayumu Iwasa	DAMS	30	57:54.568	2	25
2	10	(France) Théo Pourchaire	ART Grand Prix	30	+8.649	5	18
3	9	(Denmark) Frederik Vesti	ART Grand Prix	30	+9.887	3	15
4	11	(Brazil) Felipe Drugovich	MP Motorsport	30	+10.253	6	12 (1)
5	3	(Australia) Jack Doohan	Virtuosi Racing	30	+16.050	4	10
6	5	(New Zealand) Liam Lawson	Carlin	30	+19.080	9	8
7	2	(India) Jehan Daruvala	Prema Racing	30	+27.558	10	6
8	12	(France) Clément Novalak	MP Motorsport	30	+32.852	15	4
9	16	(Israel) Roy Nissany	DAMS	30	+36.514	20	2
10	22	(Brazil) Enzo Fittipaldi	Charouz Racing System	30	+37.686	19^{1}	1
11	21	(Australia) Calan Williams	Trident	30	+40.214	13	
12	8	(Estonia) Jüri Vips	Hitech Grand Prix	30	+45.584	7	
13	14	(United Kingdom) Olli Caldwell	Campos Racing	30	+46.476	21	
14	24	(Germany) David Beckmann	Van Amersfoort Racing	30	+48.501	16	
15	25	(Belgium) Amaury Cordeel	Van Amersfoort Racing	30	+49.092	18	
16	1	(Norway) Dennis Hauger	Prema Racing	30	+1:25.136	17	
DNF	20	(Netherlands) Richard Verschoor	Trident	28	Engine^{2}	11	
DNF	23	(Turkey) Cem Bölükbaşı	Charouz Racing System	24	Retired	22	
DNF	6	(United States) Logan Sargeant	Carlin	11	Clutch	1	(2)
DNF	15	(Spain) Roberto Merhi	Campos Racing	9	Retired	14	
DNF	7	(New Zealand) Marcus Armstrong	Hitech Grand Prix	0	Collision damage	8	
DNF	4	(Japan) Marino Sato	Virtuosi Racing	0	Spin	12	
Fastest lap set by (Brazil) Felipe Drugovich: 1:46.901 (lap 29)

Notes:

- ^1 – Enzo Fittipaldi received a five-place grid drop for causing a collision with Roberto Merhi in the Sprint Race, demoting him to nineteenth on the grid for the Feature Race.
- ^2 – Richard Verschoor retired from the race, but was classified as he completed over 90% of the race distance.

== Standings after the event ==
Drivers' Championship standings

	Pos.	Driver	Points
	1	(Brazil) Felipe Drugovich	173
1	2	(France) Théo Pourchaire	134
1	3	(United States) Logan Sargeant	118
	4	(India) Jehan Daruvala	94
5	5	(New Zealand) Liam Lawson	79

Teams' Championship standings

	Pos.	Team	Points
2	1	(France) ART Grand Prix	209
1	2	(Netherlands) MP Motorsport	199
1	3	(United Kingdom) Carlin	197
	4	(Italy) Prema Racing	161
	5	(United Kingdom) Hitech Grand Prix	136

- Note: Only the top five positions are included for both sets of standings.

== See also ==
- 2022 French Grand Prix

Previous round: 2022 Spielberg Formula 2 round	FIA Formula 2 Championship; 2022 season	Next round: 2022 Budapest Formula 2 round
Previous round: 2019 Le Castellet Formula 2 round	Le Castellet Formula 2 round	Next round: none
