= Enzo Fittipaldi =

Brazilian racing driver (born 2001)

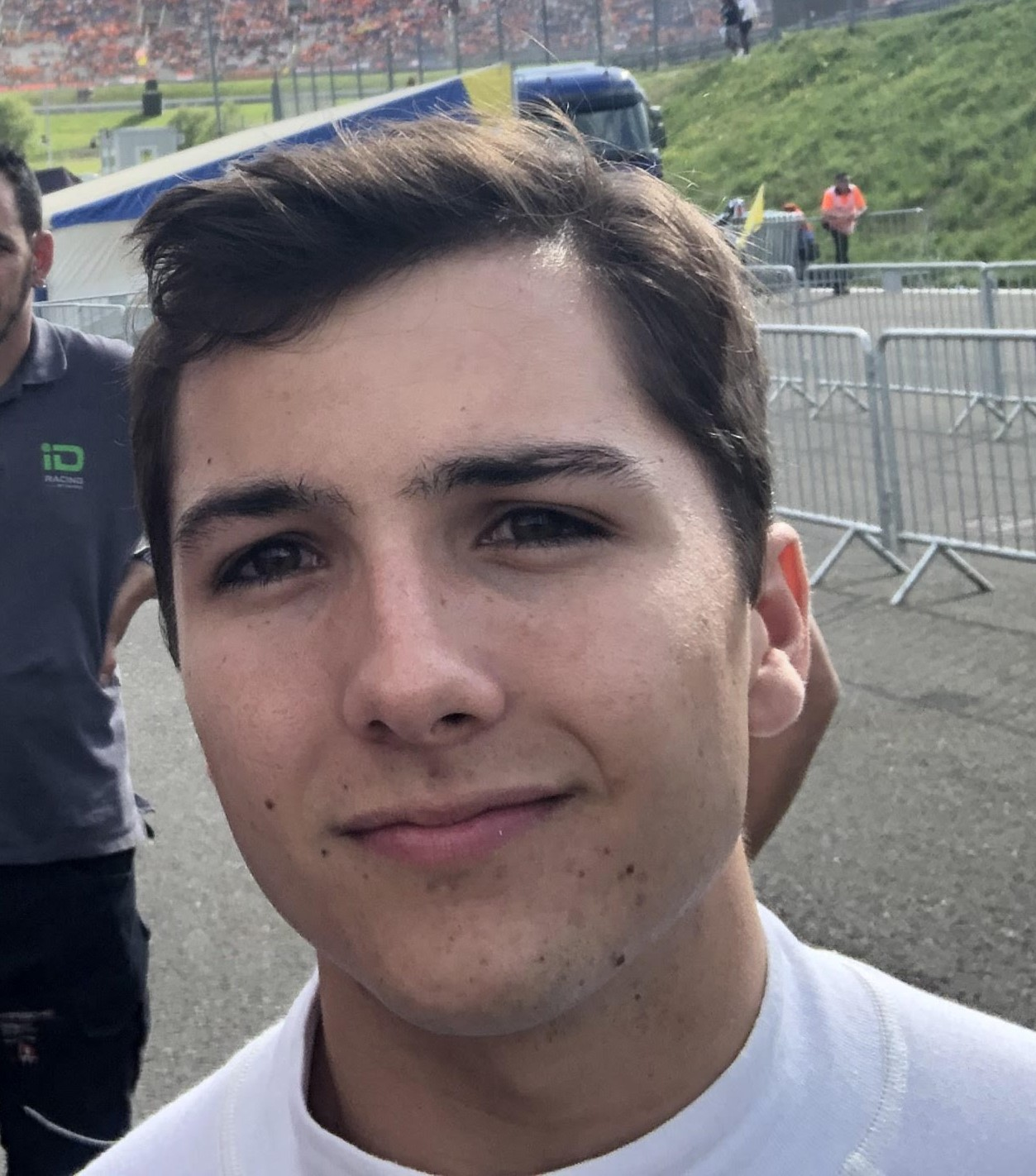
- Fittipaldi in 2022
- Nationality: (Brazil) Brazilian (United States) American
- Born: Enzo Fittipaldi da Cruz; 18 July 2001 (age 25) Miami, Florida, United States
- Relatives: Emerson Fittipaldi (grandfather); Pietro Fittipaldi (brother); Christian Fittipaldi (first cousin once-removed); Max Papis (uncle); Emerson Fittipaldi Jr. (uncle); Wilson Fittipaldi (great-uncle)

Formula E career
- Debut season: 2026–27
- Current team: Lola Formula E Team
- Categorisation: FIA Silver (until 2022); FIA Gold (2023–)
- Car number: 11
- Starts: 0
- Wins: 0
- Podiums: 0
- Poles: 0
- Fastest laps: 0
- Best finish: TBD in 2026–27

Previous series
- 2026 2025 2021–24 2021 2020–21 2019 2017–18 2017–18 2016: Indy NXT; European Le Mans Series; FIA Formula 2 Championship; Indy Pro 2000 Championship; FIA Formula 3 Championship; FR European Championship; ADAC Formula 4 Italian F4 Championship; Ginetta Junior Championship

Championship titles
- 2018: Italian F4 Championship

Enzo Fittipaldi da Cruz (Brazilian Portuguese pronunciation: [ˈẽzu fitʃiˈpawdʒi da ˈkɾus]; born 18 July 2001) is a Brazilian and American racing driver, who is set to compete in Formula E for Lola. He previously competed in the Indy NXT for HMD Motorsports.

Born in Miami, Florida, Fittipaldi is the grandson of two-time Formula 1 champion Emerson Fittipaldi by his daughter Juliana and Carlos da Cruz, and brother of racing driver Pietro Fittipaldi. Fittipaldi graduated to junior formulae in 2016, and became the champion of the 2018 Italian F4 Championship as well as placing third in ADAC F4. He then competed in the Formula Regional European Championship in 2019 where he finished runner-up, before moving up to FIA Formula 3 for 2020 and 2021. Fittipaldi progressed to FIA Formula 2 in the middle of 2021 with Charouz, and remained in the series until 2024, achieving two wins and multiple podiums.

Fittipaldi switched to endurance racing in the European Le Mans Series for 2025 with CLX Motorsport. He was a member of the Ferrari Driver Academy from 2017 to 2021, and was also part of the Red Bull Junior Team in 2023.

== Personal life ==
Fittipaldi is brothers with Pietro Fittipaldi, a former Formula One driver. His uncle, Emerson Fittipaldi Jr, currently competes in FIA Formula 2 with Fittipaldi's former team of AIX Racing (formerly Charouz Racing System and PHM Racing with Charouz). Former F1 drivers Christian, Wilson and most notably Emerson Fittipaldi Sr are his first cousin once-removed, great-uncle and grandfather respectively. Sadly, Wilson Fittipaldi passed away in 2024.

During his FIA Formula 2 days with Charouz Racing System, Fittipaldi was friends with Zdeněk Chovanec. Chovanec died on 18 July 2026. Fittipaldi expressed his sadness via a social media story.

== Junior racing career ==
=== Karting ===
Fittipaldi began his career in karting, although details of his early progression remain limited. His best national result came in the 2009 USA Rotax Grand Nationals, where he finished sixth in the Micro Max category. He later won the East Coast Karting Championship in 2014.

=== Ginetta Junior Championship ===
Fittipaldi graduated to car racing in 2016, competing in the Ginetta Junior Championship with Douglas Motorsport. Despite missing the final three rounds of the season, he finished eighteenth in the standings, with a best finish of eighth place.

=== Formula 4 ===
==== 2017 ====
In 2017, Fittipaldi moved into single-seaters with Prema Powerteam in the Italian F4 Championship. Although he did not score a podium during the season and was comprehensively outperformed by teammate and eventual champion Marcus Armstrong, Fittipaldi recorded four fifth-place finishes and ended the campaign ninth in the standings. He also made selected appearances in the ADAC Formula 4 Championship as a guest driver.

==== 2018 ====
Fittipaldi remained with Prema for a second season in the Italian F4 in 2018. He secured his maiden single-seaters victory in the opening race in Adria, before adding a second win later that weekend. After briefly losing the championship lead midway through the season, Fittipaldi responded dominantly in Misano by winning all three races and scoring maximum points to reclaim the advantage. A further double victory in Mugello allowed him to secure the championship title at the final race.

Alongside his Italian campaign, Fittipaldi contested the full ADAC Formula 4 Championship. In a season dominated by eventual champion Lirim Zendeli, Fittipaldi claimed his only victory in the second Hockenheimring round. He added eight further podiums and concluded the season third in the standings.

=== Formula Regional European Championship ===
In 2019, Fittipaldi stepped up to the inaugural Formula Regional European Championship with Prema Powerteam, partnering Frederik Vesti and Olli Caldwell. He enjoyed a strong start to the campaign, finishing on the podium in every races across the opening three rounds. During the second race of the season, Fittipaldi inherited victory after Caldwell was disqualified post-race, handing him his maiden win in the category. Although his form became less dominant as the season progressed, Fittipaldi added a further victory in Imola alongside several additional podium finishes. He ended the year as runner-up in the championship behind teammate Vesti, having scored two victories and thirteen podiums overall. Fittipaldi also contributed to Prema securing the teams' title.

=== FIA Formula 3 Championship ===
==== 2020 ====
During post-season testing in 2019, Fittipaldi drove for Prema Racing on the second day of the test. In January 2020, he was announced as a HWA Racelab driver for the 2020 FIA Formula 3 Championship, partnering Jake Hughes and Jack Doohan. Fittipaldi endured a difficult qualifying start to the season at the Red Bull Ring, lining up 29th on the grid, but produced strong recovery drives across the weekend and scored his maiden Formula 3 points with ninth place in the second race. Similar comeback performances followed throughout the year, including another ninth-place finish in the Budapest sprint race after climbing through the field. In the second Silverstone round, he initially finished in the points during the second race, but a penalty dropped him out of the top ten. He later improved his best result of the season to eighth in Barcelona. Although he failed to score points in Spa-Francorchamps, Fittipaldi gained fourteen places in the second race to finish twelfth after starting 26th. He added another ninth-place finish in the first Monza race, before enjoying his strongest weekend of the campaign in the Mugello finale. After qualifying fifth and starting fourth following a grid penalty for another driver, Fittipaldi finished fifth and fourth in the two races respectively, tripling his points tally for the season. Fittipaldi concluded his rookie campaign fifteenth in the standings, behind the more experienced Hughes, but comfortably outscoring fellow rookie teammate Doohan.

==== 2021 ====
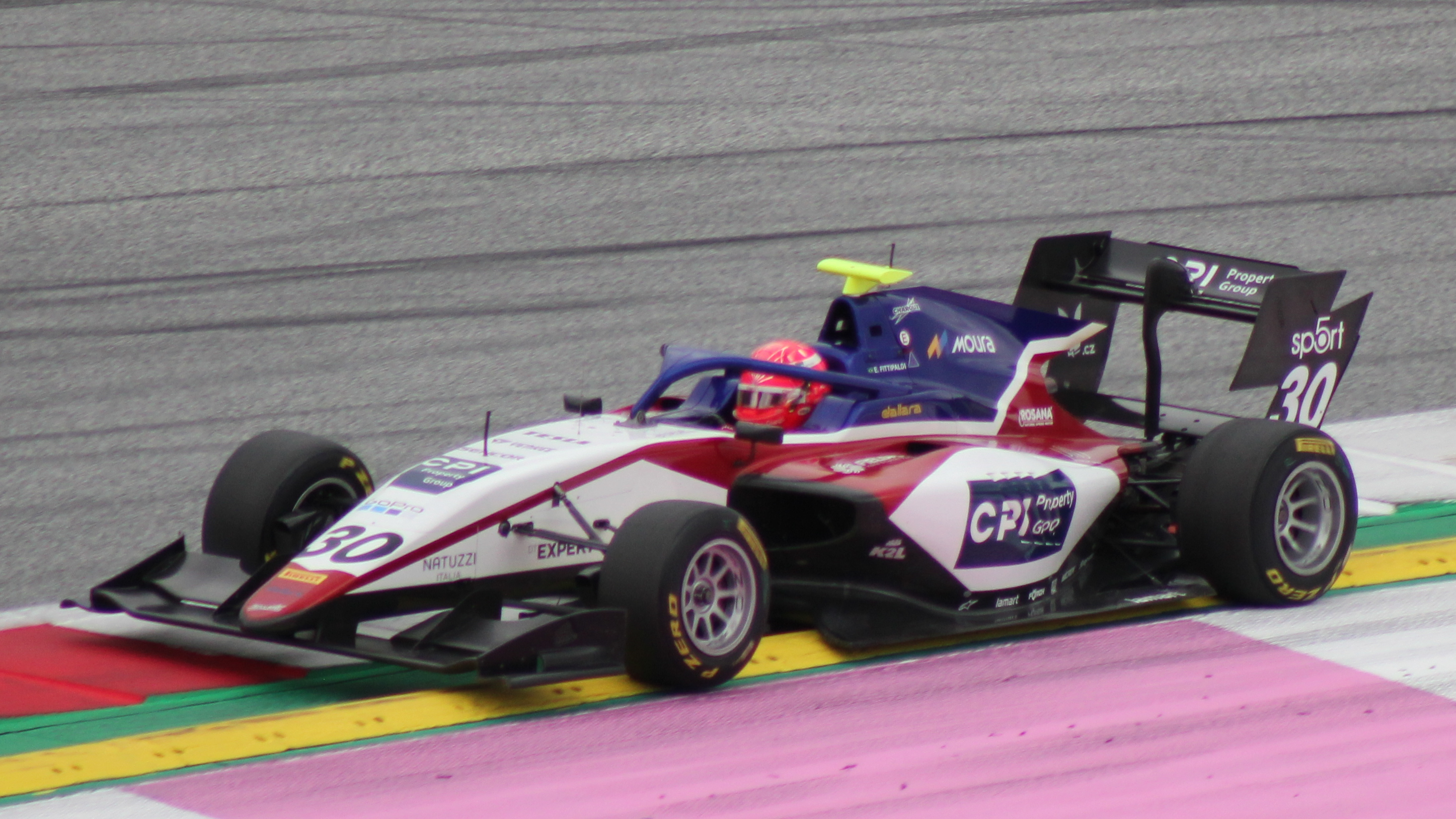
Fittipaldi driving the Dallara F3 2019 during the 2021 Spielberg Formula 3 round

In May 2021, Fittipaldi announced his switch to Charouz Racing System in the 2021 FIA Formula 3 Championship, partnering Reshad de Gerus and Logan Sargeant. At the opening round in Barcelona, finishing twelfth in Race 1 earned him reverse-grid pole (Note: In the 2021 FIA Formula 3 Championship, the top 12 finishers in Race 1 were subjected to a reverse-grid in the Race 2.) for Race 2. Fittipaldi initially led a tense battle with David Schumacher, but the pair collided on lap 15, sending Schumacher into retirement. A lap later, Fittipaldi himself retired with electrical issues. Despite failing to score points in Paul Ricard, Fittipaldi praised the atmosphere within Charouz, describing it as "one of the best [he had] ever felt". At the Red Bull Ring, Fittipaldi narrowly missed points in Race 1 after finishing eleventh on the road, but post-race penalties for several drivers promoted him to fourth, securing his first points of the season. He followed this with eighth place in Race 2 despite briefly being airborne during a wheel-to-wheel battle. At the Hungaroring, another twelfth-place finish in Race 1 handed him reverse-pole for Race 2. Although he lost the lead to Matteo Nannini on lap four, Fittipaldi held on to second place to secure his maiden FIA Formula 3 podium. He later climbed from outside the top ten to finish ninth in Race 3.

Following the Hungaroring round, Fittipaldi was replaced at Charouz by American driver Hunter Yeany. Despite contesting only part of the season, he finished seventeenth in the championship with 25 points.

=== Indy Pro 2000 Championship ===
In February 2021, Fittipaldi was announced to compete in the Indy Pro 2000 Championship for RP Motorsport. However, he left the series after the opening round and did not return. In June, Fittipaldi confirmed in an interview with former teammate Jake Hughes that he would not continue in the championship.

=== FIA Formula 2 Championship ===
==== 2021: Partial campaign ====
In September 2021, Fittipaldi stepped up to the FIA Formula 2 Championship with Charouz Racing System, partnering compatriot Guilherme Samaia for the remainder of the season. He replaced David Beckmann, who vacated the seat due to financial difficulties. Ahead of his debut weekend in Monza, Fittipaldi admitted that he “wasn’t really expecting” the opportunity, but expressed enthusiasm about making his Formula 2 debut at the circuit. He enjoyed a promising first weekend, initially finishing ninth in the feature race and appeared set to score his maiden points, before a five-second penalty demoted him to eleventh. Another solid showing followed in Sochi, where he finished twelfth in the feature race. In Jeddah, Fittipaldi score his first points of his Formula 2 career by finishing seventh in the sprint race.

However, the following day he was involved in a major accident at the start of the feature race after colliding with the stalled car of Théo Pourchaire. Both drivers required medical attention, with Fittipaldi being airlifted to the King Fahad Armed Forces Hospital. Later that evening, his brother Pietro Fittipaldi confirmed that Enzo had sustained a fractured right heel and a cut above his left eye, but was conscious and recovering. Due to his injuries, Fittipaldi was ruled out of the Abu Dhabi finale and was replaced by Richard Verschoor. He was discharged on the day of the Abu Dhabi feature race and returned to his home shortly afterwards. Despite contesting only three rounds of the season, Fittipaldi finished twentieth in the championship with two points.

==== 2022: Redemption ====
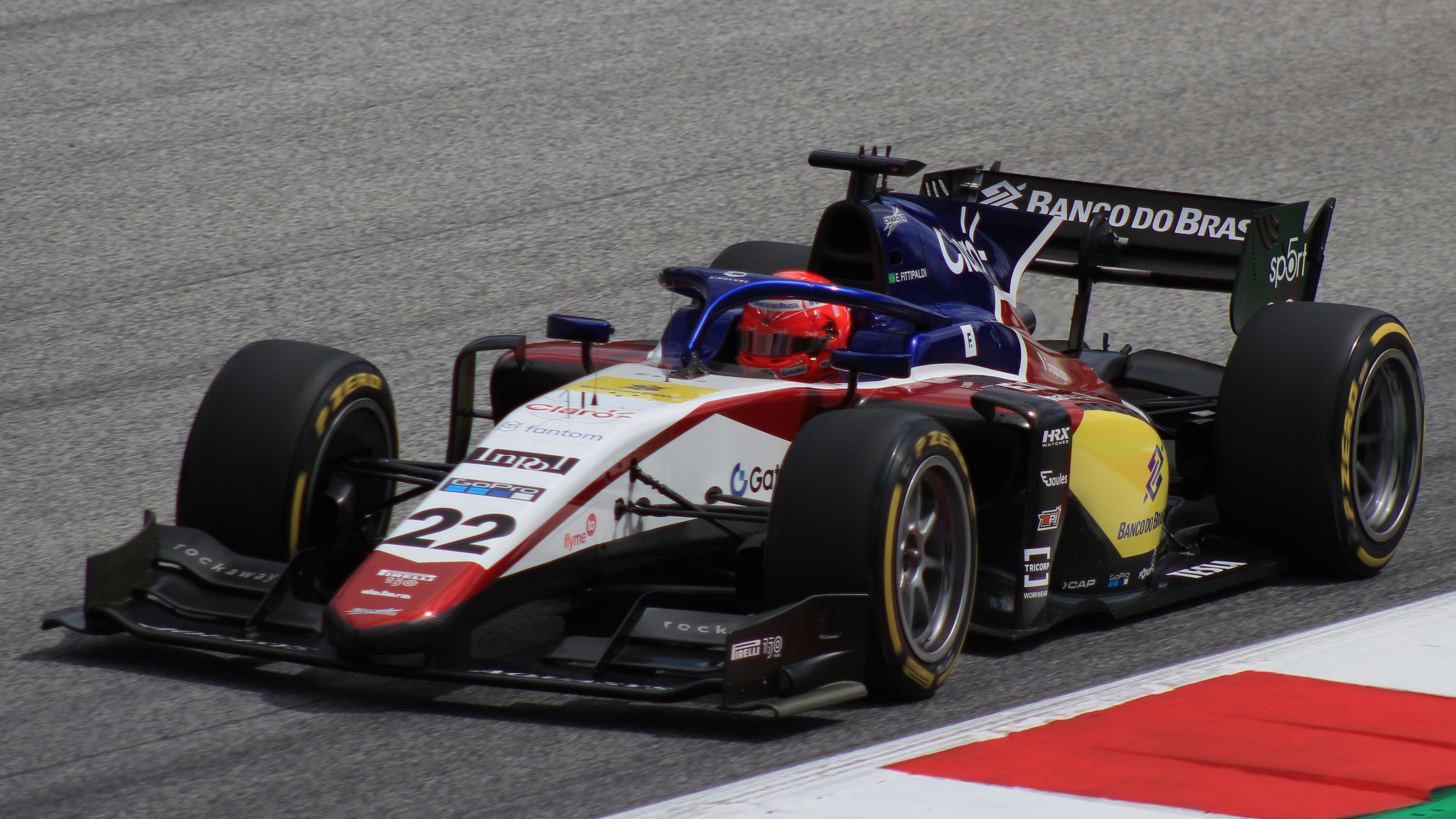
Fittipaldi driving the Dallara F2 2018 during the 2022 Spielberg Formula 2 round

On 16 February 2022, Fittipaldi was retained by Charouz for the 2022 FIA Formula 2 Championship, partnering Euroformula Open graduate Cem Bölükbaşı. After narrowly missing out on points in both Bahrain and Jeddah with eleventh-places, his campaign gained momentum in Imola. Despite qualifying fifteenth and receiving a three-place grid penalty for the sprint, Fittipaldi capitalised on an opportunistic strategy in the feature race to climb through the field. Late overtakes on Logan Sargeant and Ralph Boschung secured second place and his maiden Formula 2 podium. Fittipaldi followed this with a run of increasingly consistent performances. In Barcelona, he missed out on reverse-grid pole, (Note: In the 2022 FIA Formula 2 Championship, the top 10 qualifiers were subjected to a reverse-grid in the sprint race.) after qualifying eleventh, before recovering to eighth in the sprint race and sixth in the feature using an alternate strategy.

He continued his points-scoring form in Monaco with fourth and fifth-place finishes, though a difficult qualifying session in Baku left him down in sixteenth. After retiring from the sprint race following contact with the wall in a failed overtake an attempt on Jüri Vips, Fittipaldi recovered to sixth in a chaotic feature race. Another podium arrived in Silverstone, where he qualified ninth and started from the front row in the sprint race. Fittipaldi overtook reverse-polesitter Jehan Daruvala in wet conditions and eventually finished third behind Jack Doohan and Ayumu Iwasa. He narrowly missed out on points in the feature race after being passed by Jake Hughes on the final lap. At the Red Bull Ring, Fittipaldi qualified twelfth and inherited eighth place in the sprint following penalties for drivers ahead. In the feature race, he was among the first drivers to switch to slick tyres on the drying track, a gamble which elevated him into the top five. He ultimately finished fifth on the road but was promoted to second following post-race penalties for rivals ahead. A difficult weekend in Paul Ricard followed as technical issues confined Fittipaldi to fourteenth in qualifying, before earning a grid penalty after colliding with Roberto Merhi in the sprint. He salvaged a tenth place in the feature race, but he rebounded strongly in Hungary. He claimed third place in the sprint race after briefly leading the opening lap, In the feature race, an effective overcut strategy in the feature elevated him to second behind Théo Pourchaire. Heading into the summer break, he sat fourth in the standings with 100 points.

Fittipaldi achieved his best qualifying result of the year in Spa-Francorchamps with second place. However, a track-limits penalty in the feature race dropped him from fifth to tenth after an extended battle with Liam Lawson. In Zandvoort, he recovered from thirteenth on the grid to finish fifth in the feature race, while in Monza, and late-race timing helped him secure fourth in the feature race, later promoted to third after Iwasa's disqualification. A disappointing finale in Abu Dhabi saw Fittipaldi collide with Daruvala in the sprint race before finishing fourteenth in the feature. He ended the season eighth place in the championship with 126 points and six podium finishes. Shortly after post-season testing, it was revealed that Fittipaldi had undergone brain surgery following a brain haemorrhage, an issue that had nearly caused him to miss the opening round of the season.

==== 2023: First win ====
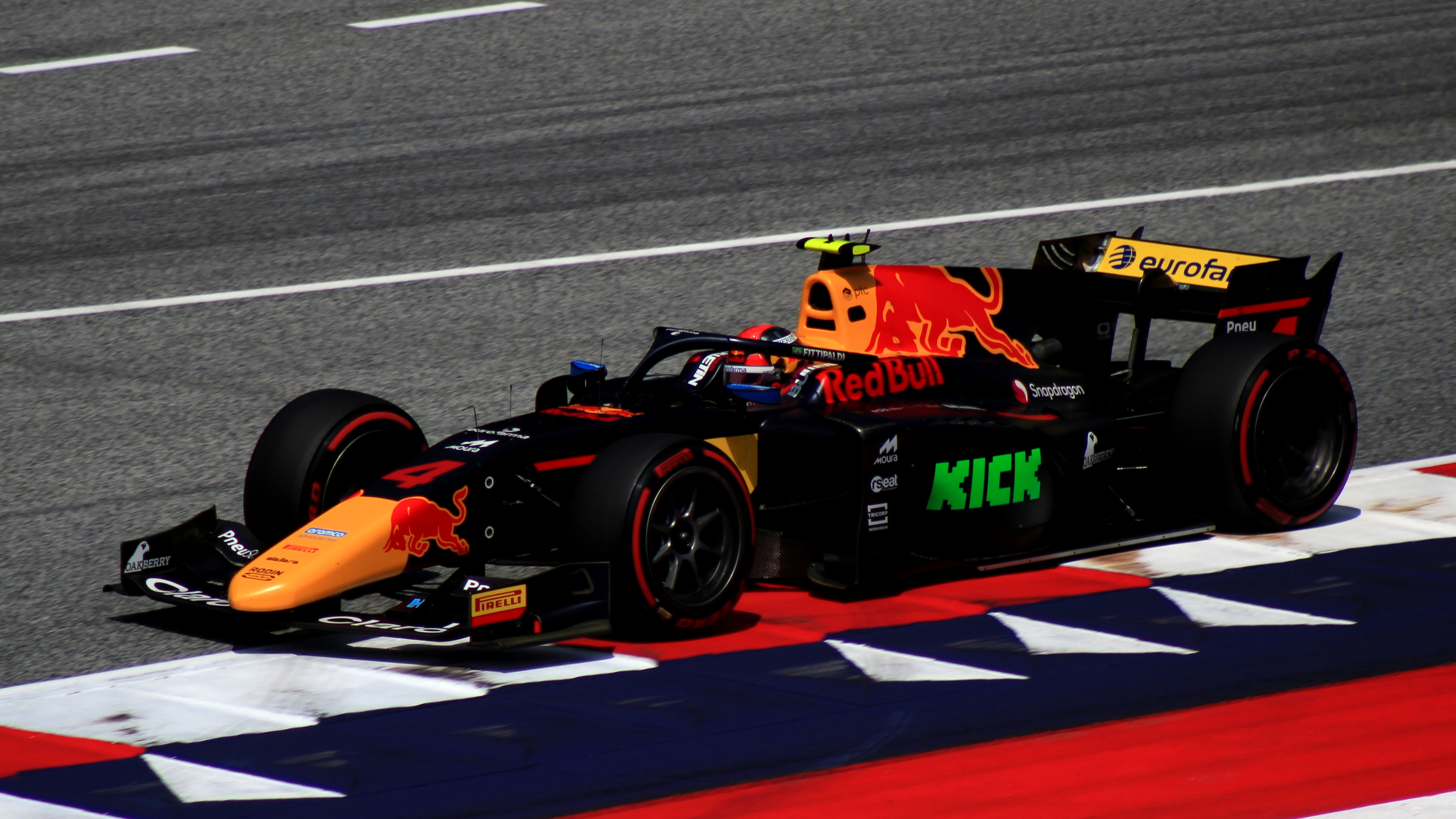
Fittipaldi driving for Rodin Carlin during the 2023 Spielberg Formula 2 round

In January 2023, Fittipaldi joined Rodin Carlin for the 2023 Formula 2 Championship, partnering fellow Red Bull junior Zane Maloney. He began the season with points finishes in Bahrain with eighth and ninth places in the sprint and feature races, while he recovered from a midfield grid position to finish seventh in the Jeddah feature race. However, his momentum was interrupted in Melbourne, where an ill-timed red flag left him sixteenth on the grid. A crash on the formation lap of the sprint race was followed by a feature race retirement after a spin damaged his suspension.

Fittipaldi returned to form in Baku, qualifying on the front row and securing his first podium of the season with second place in the feature race after repassing Théo Pourchaire in the closing stages, having finished fifth in the earlier sprint. A point-less weekend in Monaco followed after qualifying thirteenth, but he responded by qualifying second in Barcelona and finishing runner-up again in the feature race after holding off a late challenge from Victor Martins. After qualifying sixth at the Red Bull Ring, a collision with Kush Maini in the sprint race earned a subsequent three-place grid penalty. Despite this setback, Fittipaldi remained in contention for victory in the feature race, but the pit entry while leading on the alternate strategy, which ultimately led to a sixth-place finish.

A run of consistent points finishes followed through Silverstone and Hungary, before Fittipaldi enjoyed his breakthrough weekend in Spa-Francorchamps. Starting fourth in the sprint race, he managed his tyres effectively before overtaking Richard Verschoor on the penultimate lap to secure his maiden Formula 2 victory and Carlin's first win of the season. He followed this with a podium in the feature race, inheriting third after post-race penalties for rivals ahead, completing his most successful Formula 2 weekend to date. Despite qualifying nineteenth in Zandvoort, Fittipaldi recovered to seventh in the feature race, while a strong drive from thirteenth on the grid earned him fourth place in the Monza feature. He concluded the season in Abu Dhabi by taking second in the sprint race after leading early on before brake issues allowed Frederik Vesti through; a difficult feature race left him outside the points. Fittipaldi ultimately finished seventh in the championship with 124 points, one win and five podiums. Reflecting on the season, Fittipaldi described it as good but below his expectations, citing inconsistency and misfortune in several races that prevented a sustained championship challenge.

==== 2024 ====
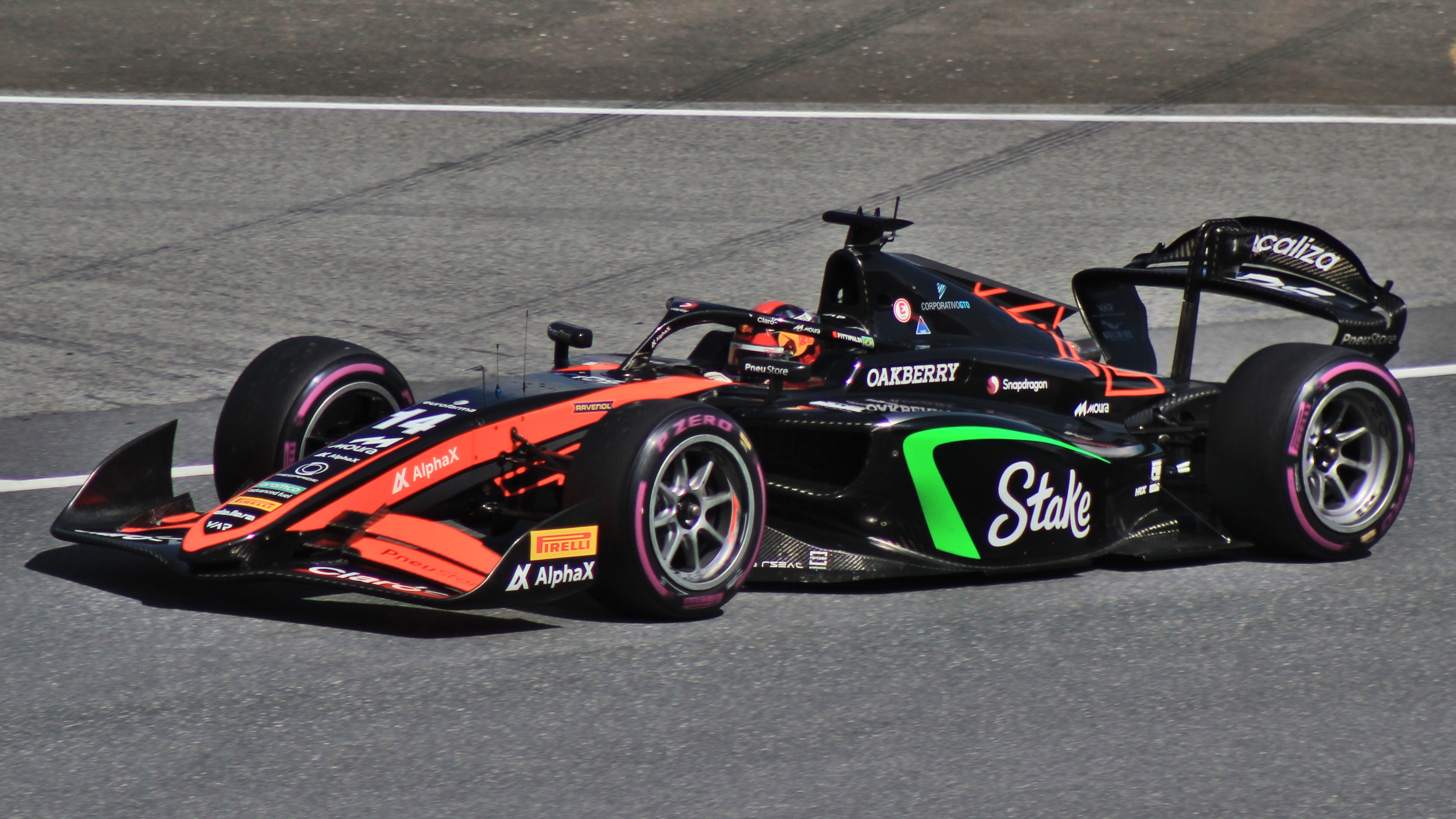
Fittipaldi driving for Van Amersfoort Racing during the 2024 Spielberg Formula 2 round

For 2024, Fittipaldi moved to Van Amersfoort Racing partnering Rafael Villagómez for what would be his third full Formula 2 campaign. His season began poorly in Bahrain, where contact with Isack Hadjar eliminated him on the opening lap of the feature race. However, he quickly rebounded in Jeddah by qualifying fourth. After finishing fourth in the sprint race, he was promoted onto the podium following the disqualification of race winner Richard Verschoor. In the feature race, Fittipaldi assumed the race lead with a pass on Kush Maini after the pit-stop phase, and controlled proceedings thereafter, securing his maiden Formula 2 feature race victory by over eight seconds.

Despite the breakthrough success, Fittipaldi struggled to build momentum over the following rounds. A series of disappointing qualifying performances frequently left him buried in the midfield and unable to challenge for regular points. His drought finally ended at the Red Bull Ring, where an aggressive early-stop strategy and strong tyre management helped him recover from fifteenth on the grid to fourth in the feature race. He employed a similar strategy in Silverstone to salvage eighth place in the feature race. Fittipaldi returned to the front in Hungary by qualifying second. Although a late puncture denied him points in the sprint race, he recovered to finish fifth in the feature. Misfortune struck again in Spa-Francorchamps, where a pit stop issue cost him a likely points finish in the feature race. In Monza, he qualified tenth and scored minor points in both races, finishing eighth in the sprint and tenth in the feature.

Ahead of the Qatar round, Fittipaldi and Van Amersfoort Racing parted ways, with the Brazilian being replaced by John Bennett. Fittipaldi placed fifteenth in the standings with 61 points.

=== Indy NXT ===
In October 2025, Fittipaldi partook in an Indy NXT test with HMD Motorsports at the Indianapolis Motor Speedway.

Before beginning his first full Indy NXT season, Fittipaldi drew on experience from prior open-wheel and endurance racing, including Formula 2 and European Le Mans Series competition. He also credited his tests in IndyCar machinery with teams including Dale Coyne Racing and Arrow McLaren for giving him early Firestone tire experience that he cited as helpful preparation for open-wheel competition in the United States.

==== 2026 ====
In 2026, Fittipaldi signed with HMD Motorsports to race in the Indy NXT.

== Formula E ==
Fittipaldi was chosen by Jaguar TCS Racing in May 2024, to participate in the Formula E Berlin rookie test alongside Sheldon van der Linde.

=== Lola (2027–) ===
In November 2026, Fittipaldi signed with the Lola Formula E Team to compete in the 2026–27 season alongside Robert Shwartzman.

== Formula One ==
In November 2016, Fittipaldi was among five drivers invited to join the Ferrari Driver Academy and was officially confirmed as a member alongside Marcus Armstrong the following month. He remained with Ferrari throughout his early junior career before leaving the programme during the winter of 2021.

Ahead of the 2023 season, Fittipaldi joined the Red Bull Junior Team. Although he was dropped from the programme at the end of the year, he continued to receive sponsorship support from Red Bull. In 2024, Fittipaldi revealed that he had come close to securing a race seat with RB for the 2024 Formula One season.

== Sportscar racing career ==
=== 2025: ELMS debut ===
On 12 February 2025, it was announced that Fittipaldi would compete in the 2025 European Le Mans Series driving for CLX Motorsport. He would be paired up with fellow Brazilian Pipo Derani and Portuguese sportscar driver Manuel Espírito Santo.

=== 2026: Daytona debut ===
In January, Fittipaldi made his first appearance in the 24 Hours of Daytona with Pratt Miller Motorsports in the LMP2 category, where he teamed up with his brother Pietro and Manuel Espírito Santo.

== Other racing ==
=== IndyCar ===
In October 2023, Fittipaldi was announced to participate in an IndyCar test with Dale Coyne Racing at Sebring International Raceway alongside his brother, Pietro Fittipaldi, who had recently signed for Rahal Letterman Lanigan Racing for the 2024 season. He returned to IndyCar machinery in November 2024, completing a further test with Arrow McLaren at The Thermal Club.

== Karting record ==
=== Karting career summary ===
Season	Series	Team	Position
2009	Florida Winter Tour — Rotax Micro Max	Tony Kart Florida	12th
2009	Rotax Grand Nationals U.S.A. — Micro Max		6th
2013	Rotax Max Challenge Grand Finals — Mini Max		8th
2015	Florida Winter Tour — Junior ROK		7th

== Racing record ==
=== Racing career summary ===
Season	Series	Team	Races	Wins	Poles	F/Laps	Podiums	Points	Position
2016	Ginetta Junior Championship	Douglas Motorsport	17	0	0	0	0	113	18th
2016–17	NACAM Formula 4 Championship	APYCSA Racing	2	0	0	0	0	4	20th
2017	Italian F4 Championship	Prema Powerteam	21	0	0	1	0	89	9th
2017	ADAC Formula 4 Championship	Prema Powerteam	3	0	0	0	1	0	NC†
2018	Italian F4 Championship	Prema Theodore Racing	21	7	9	5	12	303	**1st**
2018	ADAC Formula 4 Championship	Prema Theodore Racing	20	1	2	3	9	223	**3rd**
2019	Formula Regional European Championship	Prema Powerteam	24	2	2	5	13	336	**2nd**
2019	Macau Grand Prix	Sauber Junior Team by Charouz	1	0	0	0	0	N/A	16th
2020	FIA Formula 3 Championship	HWA Racelab	18	0	0	0	0	27	15th
2021	FIA Formula 3 Championship	Charouz Racing System	12	0	0	0	1	25	17th
2021	FIA Formula 2 Championship	Charouz Racing System	8	0	0	0	0	2	20th
2021	Indy Pro 2000 Championship	RP Motorsport USA	2	0	0	0	0	20	19th
2022	FIA Formula 2 Championship	Charouz Racing System	28	0	0	0	6	126	8th
2023	FIA Formula 2 Championship	Rodin Carlin	25	1	0	1	5	124	7th
2024	FIA Formula 2 Championship	Van Amersfoort Racing	24	1	0	2	2	61	15th
2025	European Le Mans Series - LMP2	CLX Motorsport	6	0	0	0	1	41	6th
2026	Indy NXT	HMD Motorsports	17	4	2	4	7	556	**2nd**
2026	IMSA SportsCar Championship - LMP2	Pratt Miller Motorsports	1	0	0	0	0	222	41st
2026–27	Formula E	Lola Formula E Team	0	0	0	0	0	0	TBD

^{†} As Fittipaldi was a guest driver, he was ineligible for points.

=== Complete Ginetta Junior Championship results ===
(key) (Races in bold indicate pole position) (Races in italics indicate fastest lap)

Year	Team	1	2	3	4	5	6	7	8	9	10	11	12	13	14	15	16	17	18	19	20	21	22	23	24	25	Pos	Points
2016	Douglas Motorsport	BRI; 1; 12	BRI; 2; 19	DON; 1; 12	DON; 2; 10	DON; 3; 18	THR; 1; 17	THR; 2; 12	OUL; 1; 16	OUL; 2; 15	CRO; 1; 13	CRO; 2; 12	CRO; 3; 8	SNE; 1; 15	SNE; 2; 18	KNO; 1; 10	KNO; 2; 11	KNO; 3; 12	ROC; 1	ROC; 2	ROC; 3	SIL; 1	SIL; 2	SIL; 3	BHGP; 1	BHGP; 2	18th	113

=== Complete NACAM Formula 4 Championship results ===
(key) (Races in bold indicate pole position) (Races in italics indicate fastest lap)

Year	Team	1	2	3	4	5	6	7	8	9	10	11	12	13	14	15	16	17	18	19	20	21	22	23	Pos	Points
2016–17	APYCSA Racing	COA; 1	COA; 2	COA; 3	AHR; 1 Ret	AHR; 2; 8	PUE; 1	PUE; 2	PUE; 3	MER; 1	MER; 2	MER; 3	CAN; 1	CAN; 2	CAN; 3	MTY; 1	MTY; 2	MTY; 3	SLP; 1	SLP; 2	SLP; 3	AHR; 1	AHR; 2	AHR; 3	20th	4

=== Complete Italian F4 Championship results ===
(key) (Races in bold indicate pole position) (Races in italics indicate fastest lap)

Year	Team	1	2	3	4	5	6	7	8	9	10	11	12	13	14	15	16	17	18	19	20	21	Pos	Points
2017	Prema Powerteam	MIS; 1; 11	MIS; 2; 8	MIS; 3; 5	ADR; 1; 6	ADR; 2; 7	ADR; 3; 11	VLL; 1 Ret	VLL; 2; 12	VLL; 3; 14	MUG; 1; 6	MUG; 2 Ret	MUG; 3; 6	IMO; 1 Ret	IMO; 2; 12	IMO; 3; 7	MUG; 1; 5	MUG; 2 DSQ	MUG; 3; 5	MNZ; 1; 9	MNZ; 2 Ret	MNZ; 3; 5	9th	89
2018	Prema Theodore Racing	**ADR**; **1**; 1	ADR; 2; 3	**ADR**; **3**; 1	LEC; 1 Ret	LEC; 2; 2	**LEC**; **3**; 5	MNZ; 1 Ret	MNZ; 2; 18	MNZ; 3; 5	**MIS**; **1**; 1	**MIS**; **2**; 1	**MIS**; **3**; 1	IMO; 1; 4	IMO; 2; 3	IMO; 3; 2	VLL; 1; 8	VLL; 2; 2	VLL; 3; 4	**MUG**; **1** Ret	**MUG**; **2**; 1	**MUG**; **3**; 1	1st	303

=== Complete ADAC Formula 4 Championship results ===
(key) (Races in bold indicate pole position) (Races in italics indicate fastest lap)

Year	Team	1	2	3	4	5	6	7	8	9	10	11	12	13	14	15	16	17	18	19	20	21	Pos	Points
2017	Prema Powerteam	OSC; 1	OSC; 2	OSC; 3	LAU; 1	LAU; 2	LAU; 3	RBR; 1	RBR; 2	RBR; 3	OSC; 1	OSC; 2	OSC; 3	NÜR; 1; 8	NÜR; 2; 7	NÜR; 3; 3	SAC; 1	SAC; 2	SAC; 3	HOC; 1	HOC; 2	HOC; 3	NC†	0
2018	Prema Theodore Racing	OSC; 1; 4	OSC; 2; 3	OSC; 3; 2	HOC; 1; 5	HOC; 2 Ret	HOC; 3; 7	LAU; 1; 2	LAU; 2; 6	LAU; 3; 6	**RBR**; **1**; 1	**RBR**; **2**; 2	RBR; 3; 18	HOC; 1; 4	HOC; 2; 3	NÜR; 1; 2	NÜR; 2; 3	NÜR; 3; 3	HOC; 1; 5	HOC; 2 Ret	HOC; 3; 14		3rd	223

^{†} As Fittipaldi was a guest driver, he was ineligible to score points.

=== Complete Formula Regional European Championship results ===
(key) (Races in bold indicate pole position; races in italics indicate fastest lap)

Year	Entrant	1	2	3	4	5	6	7	8	9	10	11	12	13	14	15	16	17	18	19	20	21	22	23	24	25	DC	Points
2019	Prema Powerteam	**LEC**; **1**; 2	LEC; 2; 1	LEC; 3; 2	VLL; 1; 2	VLL; 2; 2	VLL; 3 C	HUN; 1; 2	HUN; 2; 2	HUN; 3; 3	RBR; 1; 4	RBR; 2; 5	RBR; 3; 2	IMO; 1; 4	IMO; 2; 7	IMO; 3; 1	IMO; 4 Ret	**CAT**; **1**; 5	CAT; 2; 2	CAT; 3; 3	MUG; 1; 4	MUG; 2; 4	MUG; 3; 6	MNZ; 1; 13†	MNZ; 2; 4	MNZ; 3; 2	2nd	336

=== Complete Macau Grand Prix results ===
Year	Team	Car	Qualifying	Quali Race	Main race
2019	(Czech Republic) Sauber Junior Team by Charouz	Dallara F3 2019	30th	14th	16th

=== Complete FIA Formula 3 Championship results ===
(key) (Races in bold indicate pole position) (Races in italics indicate fastest lap)

Year	Entrant	1	2	3	4	5	6	7	8	9	10	11	12	13	14	15	16	17	18	19	20	21	DC	Points
2020	HWA Racelab	RBR; FEA; 18	RBR; SPR; 9	RBR; FEA; 15	RBR; SPR; 13	HUN; FEA; 19	HUN; SPR; 9	SIL; FEA; 18	SIL; SPR; 19	SIL; FEA; 17	SIL; SPR; 17	CAT; FEA; 13	CAT; SPR; 8	SPA; FEA; 26	SPA; SPR; 12	MNZ; FEA; 9	MNZ; SPR; 19	MUG; FEA; 5	MUG; SPR; 4				15th	27
2021	Charouz Racing System	CAT; 1; 12	CAT; 2 Ret	CAT; 3; 19	LEC; 1; 21	LEC; 2; 17	LEC; 3; 11	RBR; 1; 4	RBR; 2; 8	RBR; 3; 15	HUN; 1; 12	HUN; 2; 2	HUN; 3; 9	SPA; 1	SPA; 2	SPA; 3	ZAN; 1	ZAN; 2	ZAN; 3	SOC; 1	SOC; 2	SOC; 3	17th	25

=== Complete FIA Formula 2 Championship results ===
(key) (Races in bold indicate pole position) (Races in italics indicate points for the fastest lap of top ten finishers)

Year	Entrant	1	2	3	4	5	6	7	8	9	10	11	12	13	14	15	16	17	18	19	20	21	22	23	24	25	26	27	28	DC	Points
2021	Charouz Racing System	BHR; SP1	BHR; SP2	BHR; FEA	MCO; SP1	MCO; SP2	MCO; FEA	BAK; SP1	BAK; SP2	BAK; FEA	SIL; SP1	SIL; SP2	SIL; FEA	MNZ; SP1; Ret	MNZ; SP2; 16	MNZ; FEA; 11	SOC; SP1; 17	SOC; SP2; C	SOC; FEA; 12	JED; SP1; 12	JED; SP2; 7	JED; FEA; Ret	YMC; SP1	YMC; SP2	YMC; FEA					20th	2
2022	Charouz Racing System	BHR; SPR; 11	BHR; FEA; 13	JED; SPR; 10	JED; FEA; 11	IMO; SPR; 12	IMO; FEA; 2	CAT; SPR; 8	CAT; FEA; 6	MCO; SPR; 4	MCO; FEA; 5	BAK; SPR; Ret	BAK; FEA; 6	SIL; SPR; 3	SIL; FEA; 11	RBR; SPR; 8	RBR; FEA; 2	LEC; SPR; Ret	LEC; FEA; 10	HUN; SPR; 3	HUN; FEA; 2	SPA; SPR; 13	SPA; FEA; 10	ZAN; SPR; 13	ZAN; FEA; 5	MNZ; SPR; 12	MNZ; FEA; 3	YMC; SPR; Ret	YMC; FEA; 14	8th	126
2023	Rodin Carlin	BHR; SPR; 8	BHR; FEA; 9	JED; SPR; 13	JED; FEA; 7	MEL; SPR; DNS	MEL; FEA; Ret	BAK; SPR; 5	BAK; FEA; 2	MCO; SPR; 10	MCO; FEA; Ret	CAT; SPR; 10	CAT; FEA; 2	RBR; SPR; Ret	RBR; FEA; 6	SIL; SPR; 4	SIL; FEA; 7	HUN; SPR; 11	HUN; FEA; 8	SPA; SPR; 1	SPA; FEA; 3	ZAN; SPR; 15	ZAN; FEA; 7	MNZ; SPR; 15	MNZ; FEA; 4	YMC; SPR; 2	YMC; FEA; 14			7th	124
2024	Van Amersfoort Racing	BHR; SPR; 17	BHR; FEA; Ret	JED; SPR; 3	JED; FEA; 1	MEL; SPR; 12	MEL; FEA; 17	IMO; SPR; Ret	IMO; FEA; 17	MON; SPR; 9	MON; FEA; 12	CAT; SPR; 16	CAT; FEA; 11	RBR; SPR; 14	RBR; FEA; 4	SIL; SPR; 13	SIL; FEA; 8	HUN; SPR; 21	HUN; FEA; 5	SPA; SPR; 14	SPA; FEA; Ret	MNZ; SPR; 7	MNZ; FEA; 10	BAK; SPR; 13	BAK; FEA; 11	LSL; SPR	LSL; FEA	YMC; SPR	YMC; FEA	15th	61

=== American open-wheel racing results ===
==== Indy Pro 2000 Championship ====
(key) (Races in bold indicate pole position) (Races in italics indicate fastest lap)

Year	Entrant	1	2	3	4	5	6	7	8	9	10	11	12	13	14	15	16	17	18	DC	Points
2021	RP Motorsport	ALA; 1; 12	ALA; 2; 10	STP; 1 DNS	STP; 2 DNS	IMS; 1	IMS; 2	IMS; 3	LOR	ROA; 1	ROA; 2	MOH; 1	MOH; 2	GMP	NJM; 1	NJM; 2	NJM; 3	MOH; 1	MOH; 2	19th	20

==== Indy NXT ====
(key) (Races in bold indicate pole position) (Races in italics indicate fastest lap) (Races with ^{L} indicate a race lap led) (Races with * indicate most race laps led)

Year	Team	1	2	3	4	5	6	7	8	9	10	11	12	13	14	15	16	17	Rank	Points
2026	HMD Motorsports	STP; 17	ARL; 2*	BAR; 2	BAR; 4	IMS; 1	IMS; 3	DET; 1	GAT; 13	ROA; 22	ROA; 4	**MOH**; 1*	**MOH**; 1*	NSS; 11	POR; 7	MIL; 7	LAG; 8	LAG; 5	2nd	556

=== Complete European Le Mans Series results ===
(key) (Races in bold indicate pole position; results in italics indicate fastest lap)

Year	Entrant	Class	Chassis	Engine	1	2	3	4	5	6	Rank	Points
2025	CLX Motorsport	LMP2	Oreca 07	Gibson GK428 4.2 L V8	CAT; Ret	LEC; 3	IMO; 5	SPA; 6	SIL; 12	ALG; 6	6th	41

=== Complete IMSA SportsCar Championship results ===
(key) (Races in bold indicate pole position; races in italics indicate fastest lap)

Year	Team	Class	Make	Engine	1	2	3	4	5	6	7	Rank	Points
2026	Pratt Miller Motorsports	LMP2	Oreca 07	Gibson GK428 4.2 L V8	DAY; 11	SEB	WGL	MOS	ELK	IMS	PET	41st	222

== Notes ==
Sporting positions
Preceded by Marcus Armstrong	Italian F4 Championship; Champion; 2018	Succeeded by Dennis Hauger
