= 2022 Imola Formula 2 round =

Motor racing competition

(Italy) 2022 Imola Formula 2 round
Round details
- Round 3 of 14 in the 2022 FIA Formula 2 Championship.
- Location: Autodromo Internazionale Enzo e Dino Ferrari; Imola, Emilia-Romagna, Italy
- Course: Permanent racing facility 4.909 km (3.050 mi)

Sprint Race
- Date: 23 April 2022
- Laps: 25
Podium
First	(New Zealand) Marcus Armstrong	Hitech Grand Prix
Second	(India) Jehan Daruvala	Prema Racing
Third	(Norway) Dennis Hauger	Prema Racing
Fastest lap
Driver	(Estonia) Jüri Vips	Hitech Grand Prix
- Time: 1:28.841 (on 12)

Feature Race
- Date: 24 April 2022
- Laps: 35
Pole position
Driver	(Estonia) Jüri Vips	Hitech Grand Prix
Time	1:40.221	
Podium
First	(France) Théo Pourchaire	ART Grand Prix
Second	(Brazil) Enzo Fittipaldi	Charouz Racing System
Third	(Switzerland) Ralph Boschung	Campos Racing
Fastest lap
Driver	(India) Jehan Daruvala	Prema Racing
- Time: 1:28.353 (on 31)

The 2022 Imola FIA Formula 2 round was a motor racing event held between 22 and 24 April 2022 at the Autodromo Internazionale Enzo e Dino Ferrari. It was the third round of the 2022 FIA Formula 2 Championship and was held in support of the 2022 Emilia Romagna Grand Prix.

== Classification ==
=== Qualifying ===
Jüri Vips took his maiden pole position of his FIA Formula 2 career for Hitech Grand Prix, ahead of Ayumu Iwasa and Jack Doohan.

Pos.	No.	Driver	Entrant	Time	Grid SR	Grid FR
1	8	(Estonia) Jüri Vips	Hitech Grand Prix	1.40.221	10	1
2	17	(Japan) Ayumu Iwasa	DAMS	+0.157	9	2
3	3	(Australia) Jack Doohan	Virtuosi Racing	+0.210	8	3
4	15	(Switzerland) Ralph Boschung	Campos Racing	+0.275	7	4
5	1	(Norway) Dennis Hauger	Prema Racing	+0.351	6	5
6	16	(Israel) Roy Nissany	DAMS	+0.400	5	6
7	10	(France) Théo Pourchaire	ART Grand Prix	+0.641	4	7
8	2	(India) Jehan Daruvala	Prema Racing	+0.665	3	8
9	7	(New Zealand) Marcus Armstrong	Hitech Grand Prix	+0.783	2	9
10	6	(United States) Logan Sargeant	Carlin	+0.841	1	10
11	23	(Germany) David Beckmann	Charouz Racing System	+0.908	11	11
12	11	(Brazil) Felipe Drugovich	MP Motorsport	+0.910	12	12
13	12	(France) Clément Novalak	MP Motorsport	+0.952	13	13
14	5	(New Zealand) Liam Lawson	Carlin	+0.978	14	14
15	22	(Brazil) Enzo Fittipaldi	Charouz Racing System	+1.014	18^{1}	15
16	9	(Denmark) Frederik Vesti	ART Grand Prix	+1.213	15	16
17	24	(United Kingdom) Jake Hughes	Van Amersfoort Racing	+1.299	20^{1}	17
18	25	(Belgium) Amaury Cordeel	Van Amersfoort Racing	+1.371	16	18
19	20	(Netherlands) Richard Verschoor	Trident	+1.923	17	19
20	21	(Australia) Calan Williams	Trident	+2.277	19	20
21	14	(United Kingdom) Olli Caldwell	Campos Racing	+2.733	21	21
22	4	(Japan) Marino Sato	Virtuosi Racing	+3.090	22	22
107% time: 1:47.237

Notes:

- ^1 – Enzo Fittipaldi and Jake Hughes received three-place grid penalties for impeding another driver during qualifying. All three drivers had one penalty point added to their license.

=== Sprint Race ===
Pos.	No.	Driver	Entrant	Laps	Time/Retired	Grid	Pts.
1	7	(New Zealand) Marcus Armstrong	Hitech Grand Prix	25	40:50.545	2	10
2	2	(India) Jehan Daruvala	Prema Racing	25	+1.431	3	8
3	1	(Norway) Dennis Hauger	Prema Racing	25	+2.243	6	6
4	16	(Israel) Roy Nissany	DAMS	25	+2.803	5	5
5	11	(Brazil) Felipe Drugovich	MP Motorsport	25	+7.045	12	4
6	6	(United States) Logan Sargeant	Carlin	25	+9.821	1	3
7	10	(France) Théo Pourchaire	ART Grand Prix	25	+12.372	4	2
8	5	(New Zealand) Liam Lawson	Carlin	25	+12.826	14	1
9	17	(Japan) Ayumu Iwasa	DAMS	25	+13.436	9	
10	9	(Denmark) Frederik Vesti	ART Grand Prix	25	+17.714	15	
11	3	(Australia) Jack Doohan	Virtuosi Racing	25	+20.179	8	
12	22	(Brazil) Enzo Fittipaldi	Charouz Racing System	25	+21.059	18	
13	20	(Netherlands) Richard Verschoor	Trident	25	+21.493	17	
14	21	(Australia) Calan Williams	Trident	25	+22.942	19	
15	8	(Estonia) Jüri Vips	Hitech Grand Prix	25	+23.275	10	
16	4	(Japan) Marino Sato	Virtuosi Racing	25	+24.216	22	
17	14	(United Kingdom) Olli Caldwell	Campos Racing	25	+24.637	21	
18	24	(United Kingdom) Jake Hughes	Van Amersfoort Racing	25	+25.856	20	
19	12	(France) Clément Novalak	MP Motorsport	25	+26.299	13	
DNF	15	(Switzerland) Ralph Boschung	Campos Racing	9	Fuel pump/Collision	7	
DNF	23	(Germany) David Beckmann	Charouz Racing System	0	Spun off	11	
DNS	25	(Belgium) Amaury Cordeel	Van Amersfoort Racing	—	Accident^{1}	16	
Fastest lap set by (Estonia) Jüri Vips: 1:28.841 (lap 12)

Notes:

- ^1 – Amaury Cordeel could not participate at the Sprint Race after a crash in the formation lap.

=== Feature Race ===
Pos.	No.	Driver	Entrant	Laps	Time/Retired	Grid	Pts.
1	10	(France) Théo Pourchaire	ART Grand Prix	35	1:01:56.611	7	25
2	22	(Brazil) Enzo Fittipaldi	Charouz Racing System	35	+0.388	15	18
3	15	(Switzerland) Ralph Boschung	Campos Racing	35	+0.729	4	15
4	12	(France) Clément Novalak	MP Motorsport	35	+1.497	13	12
5	17	(Japan) Ayumu Iwasa	DAMS	35	+1.806	2	10
6	9	(Denmark) Frederik Vesti	ART Grand Prix	35	+2.122	16	8
7	6	(United States) Logan Sargeant	Carlin	35	+2.592	10	6
8	23	(Germany) David Beckmann	Charouz Racing System	35	+3.229	11	4
9	2	(India) Jehan Daruvala	Prema Racing	35	+4.191	8	2 (1)
10	11	(Brazil) Felipe Drugovich	MP Motorsport	35	+4.396	12	1
11	4	(Japan) Marino Sato	Virtuosi Racing	35	+4.893	22	
12	24	(United Kingdom) Jake Hughes	Van Amersfoort Racing	35	+5.044	17	
13	14	(United Kingdom) Olli Caldwell	Campos Racing	35	+6.745	21	
14	20	(Netherlands) Richard Verschoor	Trident	35	+7.271	19	
15	21	(Australia) Calan Williams	Trident	35	+7.763	20	
16	7	(New Zealand) Marcus Armstrong	Hitech Grand Prix	35	+11.287	9	
17	25	(Belgium) Amaury Cordeel	Van Amersfoort Racing	35	+1:26.403	18	
DNF	5	(New Zealand) Liam Lawson	Carlin	30	Accident	14	
DNF	16	(Israel) Roy Nissany	DAMS	20	Accident	6	
DNF	8	(Estonia) Jüri Vips	Hitech Grand Prix	5	Spun off	1	(2)
DNF	3	(Australia) Jack Doohan	Virtuosi Racing	1	Collision damage	3	
DNF	1	(Norway) Dennis Hauger	Prema Racing	0	Collision damage	5	
Fastest lap set by (India) Jehan Daruvala: 1:28.353 (lap 31)

== Standings after the event ==
Drivers' Championship standings

	Pos.	Driver	Points
4	1	(France) Théo Pourchaire	52
1	2	(Brazil) Felipe Drugovich	50
3	3	(India) Jehan Daruvala	36
2	4	(New Zealand) Liam Lawson	35
2	5	(Netherlands) Richard Verschoor	32

Teams' Championship standings

	Pos.	Team	Points
1	1	(Netherlands) MP Motorsport	62
4	2	(France) ART Grand Prix	60
2	3	(United Kingdom) Hitech Grand Prix	60
1	4	(United Kingdom) Carlin	53
	5	(Italy) Prema Racing	50

- Note: Only the top five positions are included for both sets of standings.

== See also ==
- 2022 Emilia Romagna Grand Prix
- 2022 Imola Formula 3 round

Previous round: 2022 Jeddah Formula 2 round	FIA Formula 2 Championship; 2022 season	Next round: 2022 Barcelona Formula 2 round
Previous round: 2011 Imola GP2 Asia Series round	Imola Formula 2 round	Next round: 2024 Imola Formula 2 round
