= Calan Williams =

Australian racing driver (born 2000)

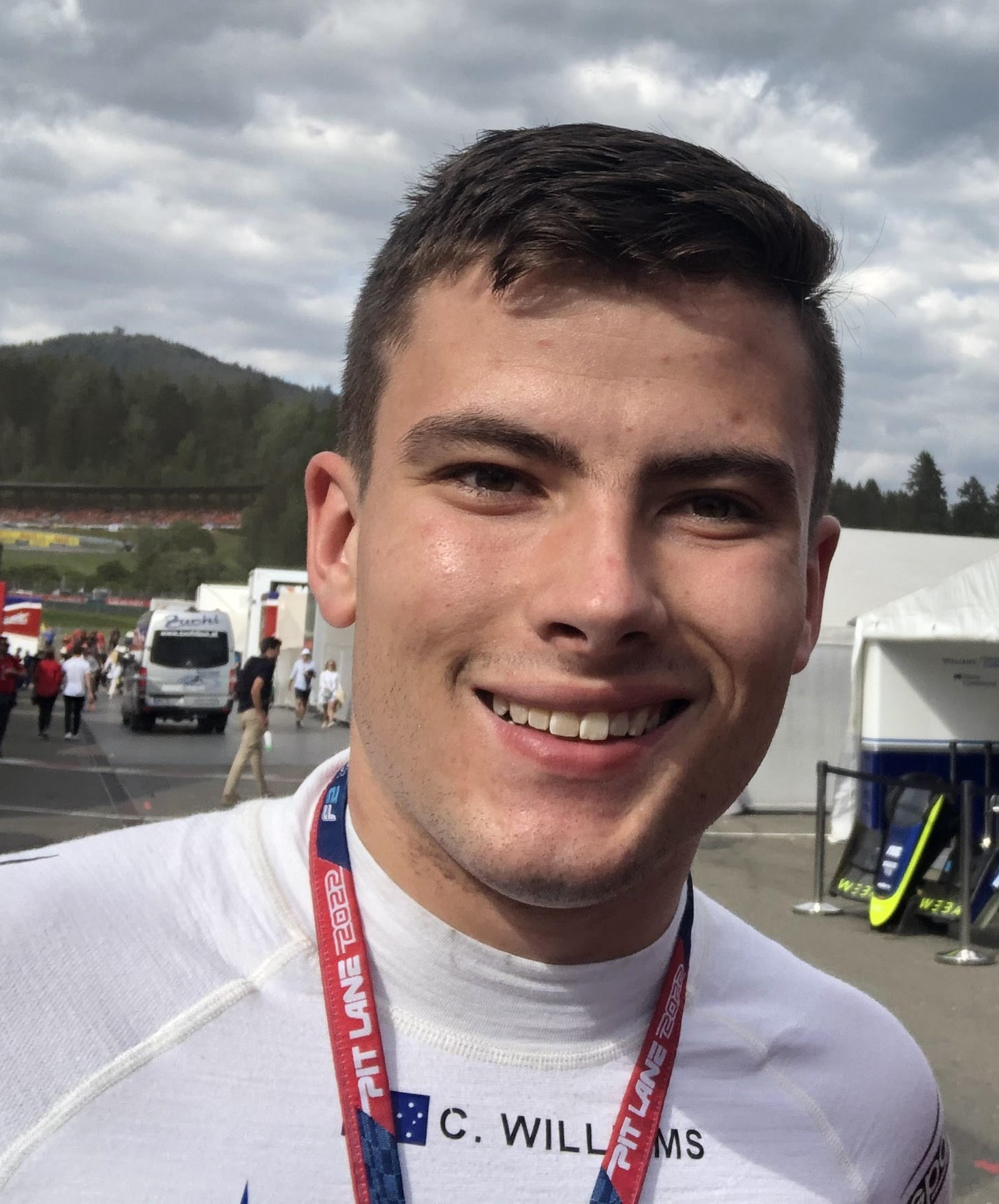
- Williams in 2022
- Nationality: (Australia) Australian
- Born: Calan Joshua Williams; 30 June 2000 (age 26) Perth, Western Australia

GTWC Europe Endurance Cup career
- Debut season: 2023
- Current team: BMW M Team WRT
- Categorisation: FIA Silver (until 2024); FIA Gold (2025–)
- Car number: 30
- Starts: 2 (2 entries)
- Wins: 0
- Podiums: 0
- Poles: 0
- Fastest laps: 0
- Best finish: TBD in 2023

Previous series
- 2022 2020-2021 2019 2018–19 2017 2015–16: FIA Formula 2 Championship; FIA Formula 3 Championship; Toyota Racing Series; Euroformula Open Championship; Australian F3 Premier Series; Western Australia Formula Ford

Championship titles
- 2024 2023 2017: GT World Challenge Europe Sprint Cup - Silver Cup; GT World Challenge Europe Sprint Cup - Gold Cup; Australian F3 Premier Series

Calan Joshua Williams (born 30 June 2000) is an Australian racing driver who last competed in the GT World Challenge Europe Endurance Cup with BMW Team WRT. He is the champion of the 2017 Australian Formula 3 Premier Series.

== Early career ==
=== Karting ===
Williams was a member of the Wanneroo-based Tiger Kart Club, and competed in karting championships across Western Australia, and in several race meetings around the country. His karting career spanned from 2007 until 2014.

=== Lower formulae ===
==== 2015 ====
Having tested a Formula Ford car for the first time in December 2014, Williams debuted in formula racing the following year in Western Australian Formula Ford, where he scored a round win on debut at the Barbagallo Raceway, having finished on the podium in two of the three races. A pole position in the final round followed, as Williams ended up tenth in the standings.

==== 2016 ====
Williams' first full season of racing came in 2016, where he returned to the Western Australian Formula Ford Championship with Fastlane Racing. Round 1 began with a good qualifying performance, as the Australian lined up third for the first race despite experiencing clutch issues on his flying lap, however the round would not yield a podium finish. Williams took pole for the next race at the Collie Motorplex, although he was penalized with a back-of-the-grid start following an overtake under red flag conditions. He beat the track record in the first two races, but one podium was the maximum of his weekend. The third round brought with it a second-place finish, despite a spin into the gravel in Race 1 setting him to the back of the starting grid for the following race, but it was during the next event that Williams would make use of his pace, missing out on victory by 0.08 seconds in the first pair of races, whilst finishing second again in Race 3. Another second place followed in the penultimate round, but Williams finally managed to score his first win in car racing in the second race, which he followed up by taking another victory to cap off the weekend, which he finished as the round winner. A triple of victories followed in the final round to end the season, which meant that Williams had finished second in the standings, missing out on the title by just eight points to Sam Dicker.

==== 2017 ====
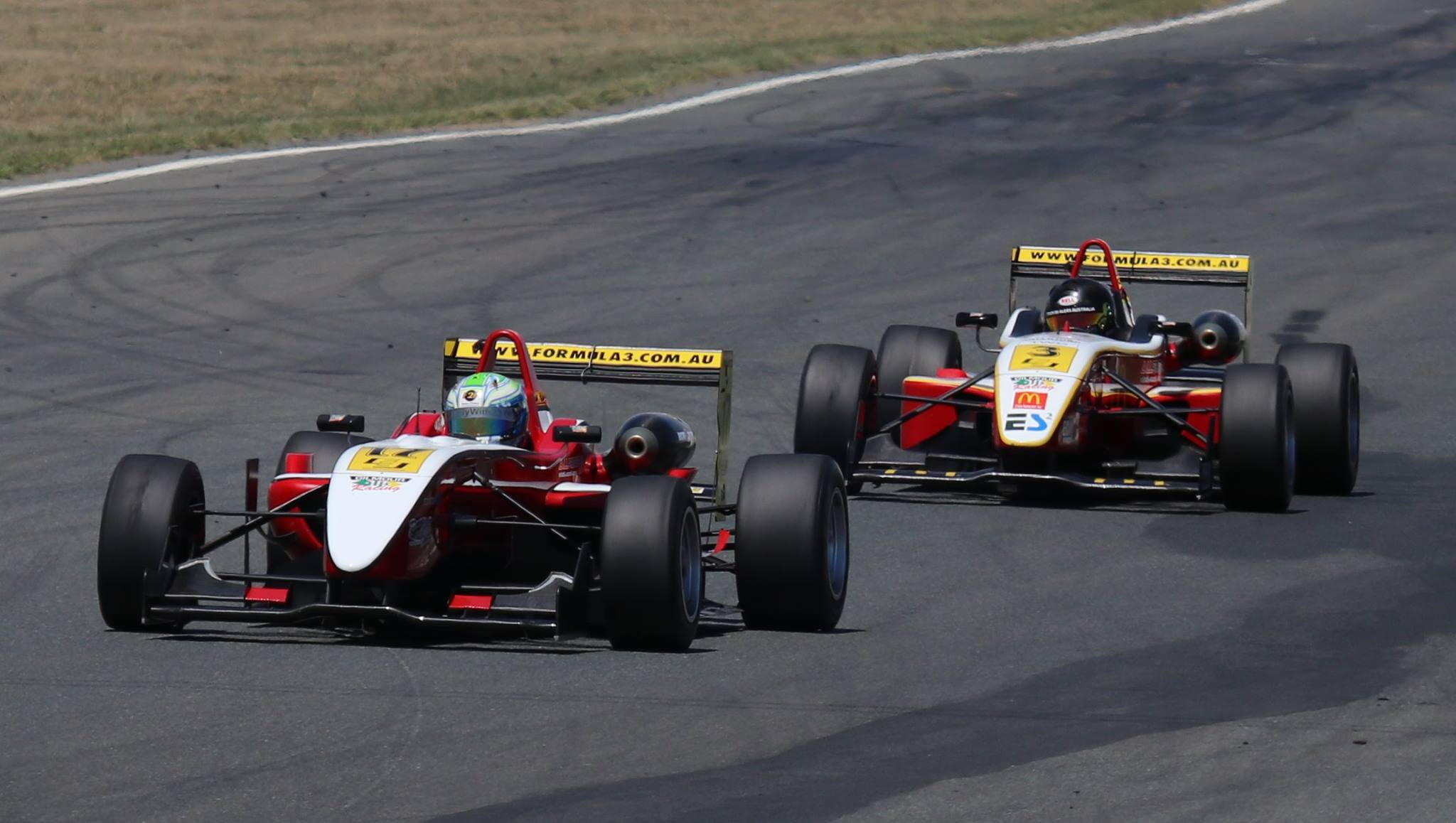
Williams (rear) driving for Gilmour Racing, chasing Jon Collins (front) in a non championship event at Wakefield Park in 2017.

For the 2017 season, Williams progressed to slicks and wings, driving in the Australian Formula 3 Premier Series with Gilmour Racing. Williams took eleven race wins and sixteen podiums, which earned him the championship title with one round to go. During the series, he set the outright lap record at Morgan Park Raceway for the circuit's K configuration, with a laptime of 1:07.948.

=== Euroformula Open ===
==== 2018 ====
After having a meeting with Fortec Motorsport in July 2017, Williams tested with the team in December at the Circuit de Barcelona-Catalunya. He then signed with the team for the opening rounds of the 2018 Euroformula Open Championship, and competed in the Euroformula Winter Series. He completed testing at the Circuito de Jerez and Circuit de Barcelona-Catalunya and placed seventh and ninth in two races at Circuit Paul Ricard. Williams made his debut in Euroformula Open at Estoril Circuit in round one of the 2018 Euroformula Series. He qualified tenth for race 1 of the round, finishing 14th in the race and qualified ninth for race two in which he then finished in 11th place.

Williams had two impressive qualifying efforts at the Monza round of the 2018 season, qualifying fifth for Race 1 and third for Race 2. In the races, he suffered early setbacks however, being taken out early in both races, but fought back to finish inside the top-ten in both races. He finished race 1 in tenth position and race 2 in eighth after being relegated to the rear end of the field following the early incidents. Williams finished the season in 11th position with 25 points.

==== 2019 ====
Williams competed again in Euroformula Open in the 2019 season with Fortec Motorsport. Williams had a season best results of fourth and fifth at the sixth round of the championship at the Red Bull Ring.

=== Toyota Racing Series ===
In December 2018, it was announced that Williams would race in the 2019 season of the Toyota Racing Series, held in New Zealand in January and February with MTEC Motorsport. Williams would return to using the number 54 that he had raced with prior to 2017. He finished eighth in the drivers' championship with 183, having finished all but two races in the points.

=== FIA Formula 3 Championship ===
==== 2020 ====
In October 2019, it was announced Williams had signed with Jenzer Motorsport for the 2020 season of the FIA Formula 3 Championship, which he stated was "a huge opportunity". He did not manage to score any points throughout the campaign however and finished 31st in the standings, with a highest finish of 14th. Despite a number of successful qualifying performances, such as qualifying fifth in Budapest, he ended up behind both of his teammates, Matteo Nannini and Federico Malvestiti.

==== 2021 ====
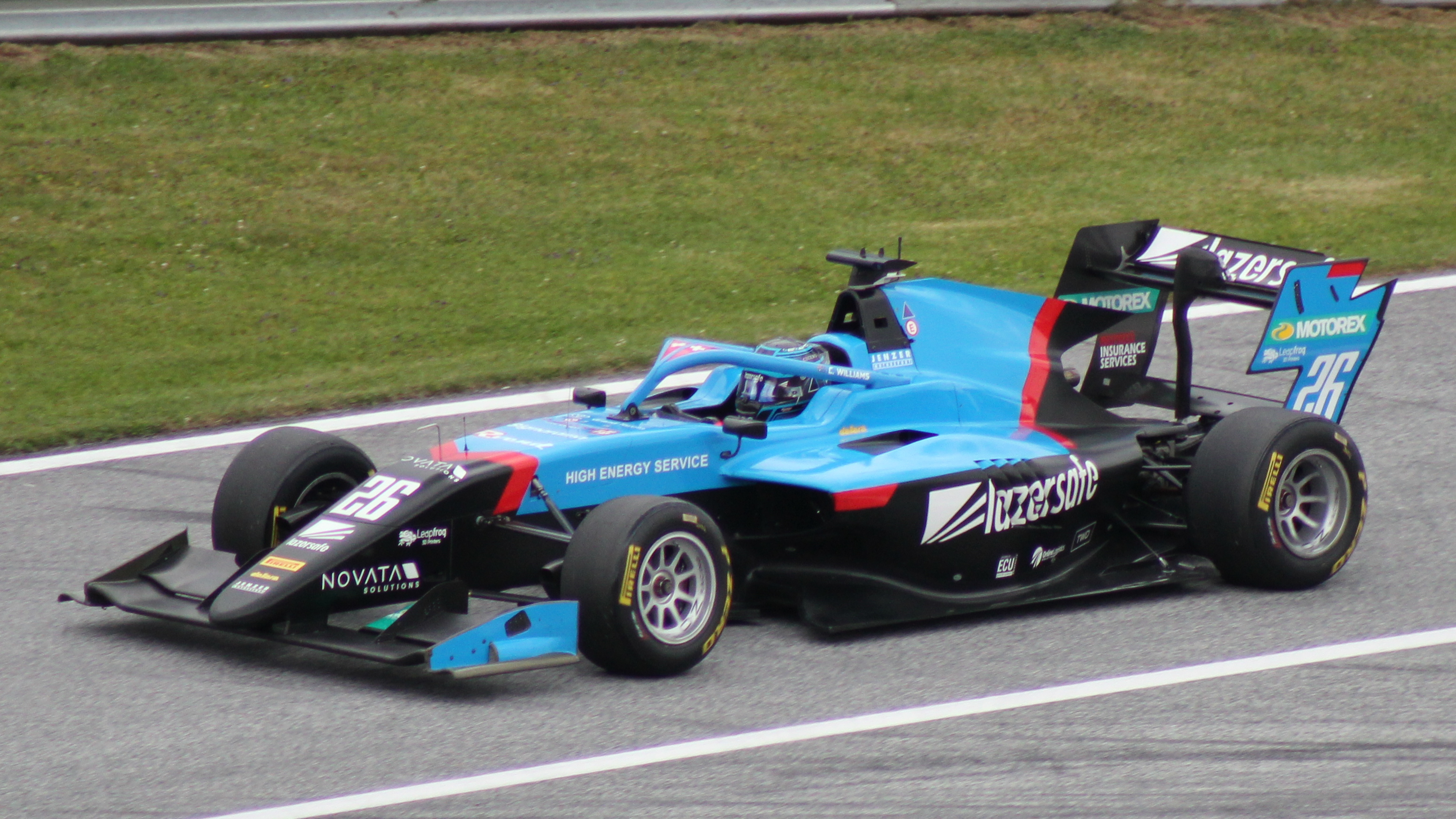
Williams at the Red Bull Ring in 2021, driving for Jenzer

Williams was retained by Jenzer Motorsport for the 2021 season, this time partnering Pierre-Louis Chovet and Filip Ugran. After a tough first round of the season where he finished just outside the points in race 2, Williams broke through for his maiden FIA Formula 3 podium and points finish at Le Castellet. Williams qualified on reverse pole for Race 1, where he finished third after trading places for the lead and podium spots throughout the race. Williams followed it up with another points finish in race 2, finishing tenth. In Race 3, he finished in his starting grid spot of 12th after the rain-affected race. The Australian's next points finish came at the Red Bull Ring, where he ended up ninth in Sunday's race. In the following two rounds Williams would be unable to score points, and at the Circuit de Spa-Francorchamps he was involved in a collision with Amaury Cordeel in the Eau Rouge-Radillion complex. Both drivers escaped the impact without injuries. Williams finished the season without scoring any more points and ended up 19th in the standings, having been the highest-scoring Jenzer driver that season.

=== FIA Formula 2 Championship ===
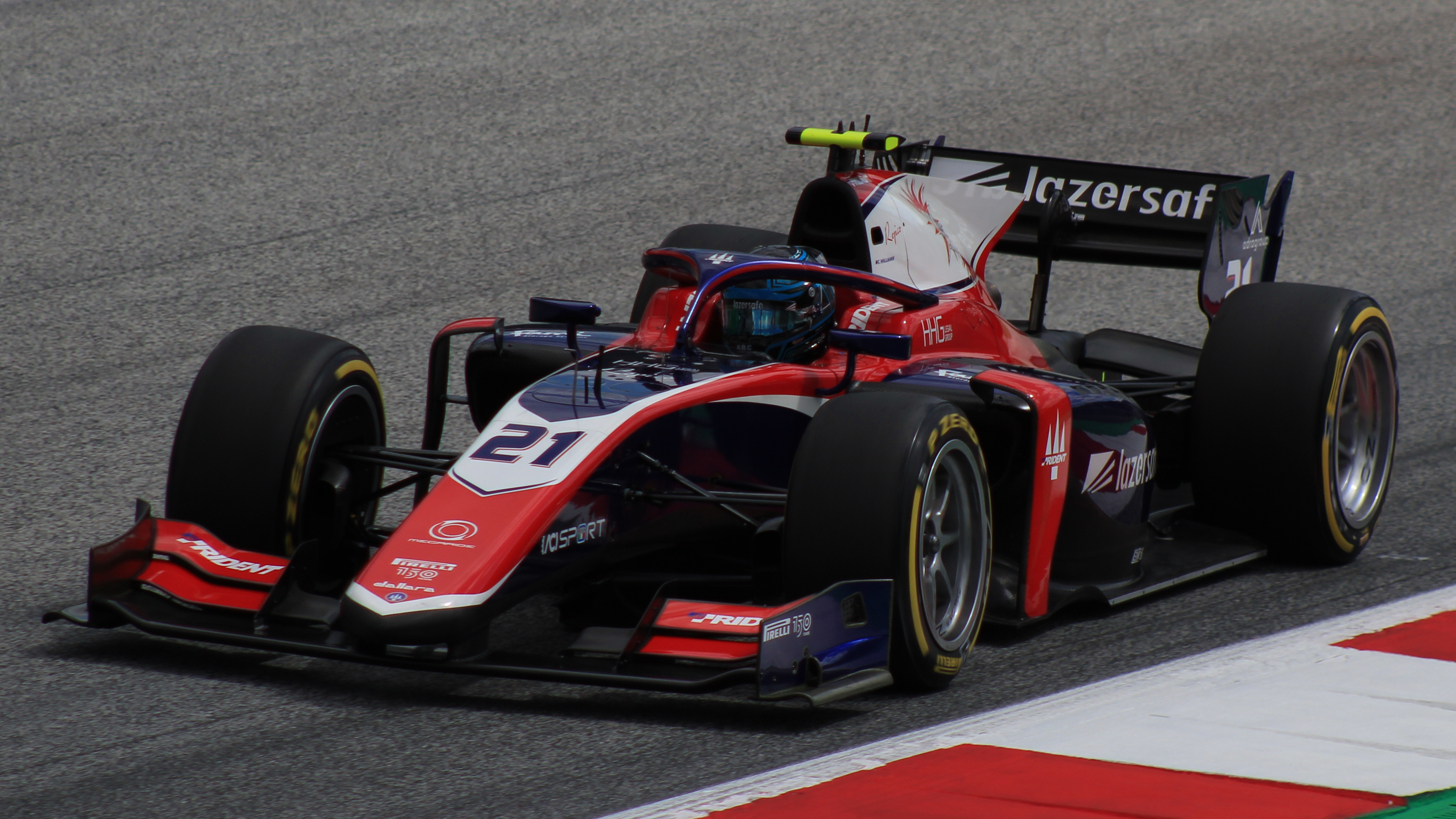
Williams driving the Dallara F2 2018 during the 2022 Spielberg Formula 2 round.

In January 2022, it was announced that Williams will drive for Trident in the 2022 season of the FIA Formula 2 Championship. Having qualified twelfth on debut, he proceeded to have an uneventful first race, finishing 15th whilst teammate Richard Verschoor was victorious. In the Bahrain feature race, Williams started the race well, getting up to sixth by the end of the first lap and staying in the points after his pit stop. However, after a safety car was called late in the race Williams pitted for new tyres, but was forced to retire from the race after the team hadn't fitted a tyre on the car properly, leaving it to bounce off after the Australian had left his pit box. At the following round in Saudi Arabia, Williams managed to qualify in seventh place, giving him the opportunity to start the sprint race from the second row. He would end up losing one position, finishing fourth and thus scoring his first points in the category. A pair of anonymous races at Imola came up next, whereas the round at Barcelona would harbour initial promise, as the Australian qualified tenth, setting him up to start from pole position on Saturday. However, a stall on the formation lap prevented Williams from contending for a podium finish. Williams was unlucky in the Monaco feature race, running in the points until the last lap, where he and Ayumu Iwasa collided on the last lap. He would go on to have a quiet rest of the season, and failed to score any more points.

In October, Williams and Trident parted ways before the season finale in Yas Marina, citing the need to "focus on the next steps of his motorsport career". He placed 23rd in the standings, with four points.

== Sportscar racing career ==
=== GT World Challenge Europe ===
==== 2023 ====
For 2023, Williams moved to sportscar racing, teaming up with BMW M Team WRT for the Gold Cup category in the GT World Challenge Europe Endurance and Sprint Cup series.

The season began promisingly, as Williams took a podium in his category during the opening Endurance Cup round at Monza, finishing third along with Niklas Krütten and Jean-Baptiste Simmenauer. During his maiden weekend in the Sprint Cup, Williams managed to take a class victory in race 2 at Brands Hatch, having inherited the car from teammate Krütten in a leading position. At Le Castellet, the Australian was able to progress from fourth to second in class during the opening stint, though the team was forced to retire when Simmenauer stopped the No. 30 with a suspected engine issue after two hours.

Williams and his WRT stablemates returned to the category podium at the 24 Hours of Spa, coming second after spending the majority of the race in the podium places. Though they managed to appear on the rostrum again at the Nürburgring, the No. 30 trio failed to take a class win all season, eventually leading them to finish fifth in the class standings of the Endurance Cup.

Their campaign in the Sprint Cup wrote a different story, as two further class podiums - including a win - at Misano were followed by another class victory at Hockenheim, a race which Williams finished in fifth place overall. The round at Valencia turned out to be a setback in the No. 30's Gold Cup title ambitions, as contact at the start of race one forced them to retire early. After being demoted to second place at the first Zandvoort race due to a penalty, Williams and Krütten entered the final race with a 1.5-point deficit to the leading No. 9 of Aurélien Panis and Alberto di Folco. Sunday's qualifying session brought an extra point, as Williams qualified on Gold Cup pole and started the race from the overall front row due to penalties for two cars ahead. Williams, who started the car, got into the lead as a rain shower caused the leading WRT of Maxime Martin to slide off, before Krütten was passed shortly after a safety car restart, finishing third overall and winning the class race, thus bringing home both the Sprint Cup title as well as the overall Gold Cup championship.

==== 2024 ====
Williams returned to WRT to partake in a single programme in the Sprint Cup, this time partnering Sam De Haan in the Silver Cup. Williams established himself as one of the stronger drivers in the subclass by scoring pole positions at Brands Hatch and Misano. He and De Haan also became consistent podium finishers, claiming a spot on the rostrum in each of the first six races. This included a dominant round at Misano where the pair won their class both times, as well as two overall fifth places (and a subclass win) at the Hockenheimring. Despite missing the podium in race 1 at Magny-Cours Williams remained first in the Silver Cup standings going into the final round, one for which he would be joined by Sean Gelael. With a podium in the final race Williams and the No. 30 WRT squad were crowned Silver Cup champions, five points ahead of the No. 10 Boutsen VDS outfit of Aurélien Panis and César Gazeau.

== Personal life ==
As of 2021, Williams was studying Computer Science online at Edith Cowan University.

To amass the funding needed for a racing career in Europe, Williams and his father set up an incorporated company, which investors would be able to buy shares in.

== Racing record ==
=== Racing career summary ===
Season	Series	Team	Races	Wins	Poles	F/laps	Podiums	Points	Position
2015	Western Australian Formula Ford	Fastlane Racing	9	0	1	4	3	142	10th
2016	Western Australian Formula Ford	Fastlane Racing	21	5	6	8	12	363	**2nd**
2017	Australian Formula 3 Premier Series	Gilmour Racing	17	11	6	15	16	232	**1st**
2017	New South Wales Formula Race Car Championship	Gilmour Racing	6	2	2	6	6	0	NC†
2017	Queensland Sports and Racing Car Championship	Gilmour Racing	5	4	1	5	4	0	NC†
2018	Euroformula Open Championship	Fortec Motorsports	12	0	0	0	0	25	11th
2018	Spanish Formula 3 Championship	Fortec Motorsports	2	0	0	0	0	2	18th
2019	Euroformula Open Championship	Fortec Motorsports	18	0	0	0	0	53	13th
2019	Toyota Racing Series	MTEC Motorsport	15	0	0	0	0	183	8th
2020	FIA Formula 3 Championship	Jenzer Motorsport	18	0	0	0	0	0	31st
2021	FIA Formula 3 Championship	Jenzer Motorsport	20	0	0	0	1	15	19th
2022	FIA Formula 2 Championship	Trident	26	0	0	0	0	5	23rd
2023	GT World Challenge Europe Sprint Cup	Team WRT	10	0	0	0	1	18.5	9th
2023	GT World Challenge Europe Sprint Cup - Gold Cup	Team WRT	10	4	1	2	6	113.5	**1st**
2023	GT World Challenge Europe Endurance Cup	Team WRT	5	0	0	0	0	0	NC
2023	GT World Challenge Europe Endurance Cup - Gold Cup	Team WRT	5	0	0	0	3	78	5th
2023	Intercontinental GT Challenge	Team WRT	1	0	0	0	0	4	28th
2024	GT World Challenge Europe Sprint Cup	Team WRT	10	0	0	0	0	19	10th
2024	GT World Challenge Europe Sprint Cup - Silver Cup	Team WRT	10	3	2	3	8	112.5	**1st**
2024	GT World Challenge Europe Endurance Cup	OQ by Oman Racing	1	0	0	0	0	0	NC
2024	GT World Challenge Europe Endurance Cup - Bronze Cup	OQ by Oman Racing	1	0	0	0	0	1	44th
2024	Intercontinental GT Challenge	OQ by Oman Racing	1	0	0	0	0	0	NC
2026	GT World Challenge Europe Endurance Cup	Oman Racing by Century Motorsport	5	0	0	0	0	0	NC
2026–27	Asian Le Mans Cup – LMP3 Pro	Bretton Racing							

^{*} Season still in progress.
^{†} As Williams was a guest driver, he was ineligible for points.

=== Complete Western Australian Formula Ford results ===
(key) (Races in bold indicate pole position) (Races in italics indicate fastest lap)

Year	Team	1	2	3	4	5	6	7	8	9	10	11	12	13	14	15	16	17	18	19	20	21	Pos	Points
2015	Fastlane Racing	WAN1; 1	WAN1; 2	WAN1; 3	COL; 1	COL; 2	COL; 3	WAN2; 1	WAN2; 2	WAN2; 3	WAN3; 1	WAN3; 2	WAN3; 3	WAN4; 1; 4	WAN4; 2; 2	WAN4; 3; 2	WAN5; 1; 4	WAN5; 2; 7	WAN5; 3 Ret	**WAN6**; **1**; 2	WAN6; 2; 4	WAN6; 3; 4	10th	142
2016	Fastlane Racing	WAN1; 1; 5	WAN1; 2; 3	WAN1; 3; 14	**COL**; **1**; 5	COL; 2; 3	COL; 3; 6	**WAN2**; **1** Ret	WAN2; 2; 5	WAN2; 3; 2	**WAN3**; **1**; 2	WAN3; 2; 2	WAN3; 3; 2	**WAN4**; **1** Ret	WAN4; 2; 5	WAN4; 3; 5	**WAN5**; **1**; 2	WAN5; 2; 1	WAN5; 3; 1	**WAN6**; **1**; 1	WAN6; 2; 1	WAN6; 3; 1	2nd	363

=== Complete Australian Formula 3 Premier Series results ===
(key) (Races in bold indicate pole position) (Races in italics indicate fastest lap)

Year	Team	1	2	3	4	5	6	7	8	9	10	11	12	13	14	15	16	17	18	Pos	Points
2017	Gilmour Racing	**MOR**; **1**; 1	MOR; 2 Ret	MOR; 3 DNS	**MAL**; **1**; 1	MAL; 2; 1	MAL; 3; 2	**SYD**; **1**; 1	SYD; 2; 2	SYD; 3; 2	**PHI**; **1**; 1	PHI; 2; 1	PHI; 3; 1	**QLD**; **1**; 1	QLD; 2; 1	QLD; 3; 1	**WAK**; **1**; 1	WAK; 2; 2	WAK; 3; 2	1st	232

=== Complete Euroformula Open Championship results ===
(key) (Races in bold indicate pole position; races in italics indicate points for the fastest lap of top ten finishers)

Year	Entrant	1	2	3	4	5	6	7	8	9	10	11	12	13	14	15	16	17	18	DC	Points
2018	Fortec Motorsports	EST; 1; 14	EST; 2; 11	LEC; 1 Ret	LEC; 2; 12	SPA; 1; 7	SPA; 2; 14	HUN; 1; 6	HUN; 2; 11	SIL; 1; 9	SIL; 2; 8	MNZ; 1; 10	MNZ; 2; 8	JER; 1	JER; 2	CAT; 1	CAT; 2			11th	25
2019	Fortec Motorsports	LEC; 1; 12	LEC; 2; 16	PAU; 1; 7	PAU; 2; 11	HOC; 1; 15	HOC; 2; 9	SPA; 1; 12	SPA; 2; 8	HUN; 1; 8	HUN; 2; 8	RBR; 1; 4	RBR; 2; 5	SIL; 1; 10	SIL; 2; 7	CAT; 1; 14	CAT; 2; 14	MNZ; 1; 16	MNZ; 2; 10	13th	53

=== Complete Toyota Racing Series results ===
(key) (Races in bold indicate pole position) (Races in italics indicate fastest lap)

Year	Team	1	2	3	4	5	6	7	8	9	10	11	12	13	14	15	16	17	DC	Points
2019	MTEC Motorsport	HIG; 1; 11	HIG; 2; 7	HIG; 3; 8	TER; 1; 7	TER; 2 C	TER; 3 C	HMP; 1 Ret	HMP; 2; 8	HMP; 3; 8	HMP; 4; 7	TAU; 1; 8	TAU; 2; 8	TAU; 3; 9	TAU; 4; 7	MAN; 1; 5	MAN; 2; 7	MAN; 3 Ret	8th	183

=== Complete FIA Formula 3 Championship results ===
(key) (Races in bold indicate pole position; races in italics indicate points for the fastest lap of top ten finishers)

Year	Entrant	1	2	3	4	5	6	7	8	9	10	11	12	13	14	15	16	17	18	19	20	21	DC	Points
2020	Jenzer Motorsport	RBR; FEA; 21	RBR; SPR; 17	RBR; FEA; 25	RBR; SPR; 24	HUN; FEA; Ret	HUN; SPR; 15	SIL; FEA; 14	SIL; SPR; 14	SIL; FEA; Ret	SIL; SPR; Ret	CAT; FEA; 25	CAT; SPR; 14	SPA; FEA; 16	SPA; SPR; 25	MNZ; FEA; 25	MNZ; SPR; 18	MUG; FEA; 19	MUG; SPR; 21				31st	0
2021	Jenzer Motorsport	CAT; 1; 18	CAT; 2; 11	CAT; 3; 21	LEC; 1; 3	LEC; 2; 8	LEC; 3; 12	RBR; 1; 16	RBR; 2; 15	RBR; 3; 9	HUN; 1; 17	HUN; 2; 24	HUN; 3; 17	SPA; 1; 24	SPA; 2 Ret	SPA; 3; 18	ZAN; 1; 16	ZAN; 2; 22	ZAN; 3; 18	SOC; 1; 19	SOC; 2 C	SOC; 3; 12	19th	15

=== Complete FIA Formula 2 Championship results ===
(key) (Races in bold indicate pole position) (Races in italics indicate points for the fastest lap of top ten finishers)

Year	Entrant	1	2	3	4	5	6	7	8	9	10	11	12	13	14	15	16	17	18	19	20	21	22	23	24	25	26	27	28	DC	Points
2022	Trident	BHR; SPR; 15	BHR; FEA; 18†	JED; SPR; 4	JED; FEA; 13	IMO; SPR; 14	IMO; FEA; 15	CAT; SPR; 16	CAT; FEA; 11	MCO; SPR; 14	MCO; FEA; 16†	BAK; SPR; 16†	BAK; FEA; 16	SIL; SPR; 17	SIL; FEA; 16	RBR; SPR; 14	RBR; FEA; 15	LEC; SPR; 13	LEC; FEA; 11	HUN; SPR; 11	HUN; FEA; 16	SPA; SPR; 16	SPA; FEA; 16	ZAN; SPR; 18	ZAN; FEA; 11	MNZ; SPR; 14	MNZ; FEA; Ret	YMC; SPR	YMC; FEA	23rd	5

=== Complete GT World Challenge Europe results ===
==== GT World Challenge Europe Endurance Cup ====
Year	Team	Car	Class	1	2	3	4	5	6	7	Pos.	Points
2023	BMW M Team WRT	BMW M4 GT3	Gold	MNZ; 12	LEC; Ret	SPA; 6H; 20	SPA; 12H; 18	SPA; 24H; 14	NÜR; 16	CAT; 21	5th	78
2024	OQ by Oman Racing	BMW M4 GT3	Bronze	LEC	SPA; 6H; 43	SPA; 12H; 34	SPA; 24H; Ret	NÜR	MNZ	JED	44th	1
2026	Oman Racing by Century Motorsport	BMW M4 GT3 Evo	Bronze	LEC; 29	MNZ; 12	SPA; 6H; 55	SPA; 12H; 48	SPA; 24H; Ret	NÜR; 33	ALG; 26	8th	49

^{*} Season still in progress.

==== GT World Challenge Europe Sprint Cup ====
Year	Team	Car	Class	1	2	3	4	5	6	7	8	9	10	Pos.	Points
2023	BMW M Team WRT	BMW M4 GT3	Gold	BRH; 1; 15	BRH; 2; 7	MIS; 1; 11	MIS; 2; 11	HOC; 1; 5	HOC; 2; 30	VAL; 1 Ret	VAL; 2; 18	ZAN; 1; 13	**ZAN**; **2**; 3	1st	113.5
2024	Team WRT	BMW M4 GT3	Silver	**BRH**; **1**; 8	BRH; 2; 15	**MIS**; **1**; 6	MIS; 2; 10	HOC; 1; 5	HOC; 2; 5	MAG; 1; 22	MAG; 2; 14	CAT; 1; 15	CAT; 2; 14	1st	112.5

Sporting positions
Preceded by Tim Macrow	Australian Formula 3 Premier Series; Champion; 2017	Succeeded by Harri Jones
Preceded by Inaugural	GT World Challenge Europe Sprint Cup; Gold Cup Champion; 2023; With: Niklas Krütten	Succeeded by Luca Engstler; Max Hofer
Preceded by Jordan Love	GT World Challenge Europe Sprint Cup; Silver Cup Champion; 2024	Succeeded by Incumbent
