= 2017 Australian Formula 3 Premier Series =

Motor racing competition

The 2017 Australian Formula 3 Premier Series is an Australian open-wheel racing series for FIA Formula 3 cars constructed and conforming to the regulations before and including 2011. The series begins on 20 May 2017 at Morgan Park Raceway and will conclude 22 October 2017 at Wakefield Park. One non-championship race weekend was held at Wakefield Park starting 18 February 2017 and ending 19 February 2017.

The 2017 Australian Formula 3 Premier Series returns to the Hankook tyres for 2017. Round 1 at Morgan Park Raceway saw Calan Williams break the outright lap record.

== Classes ==
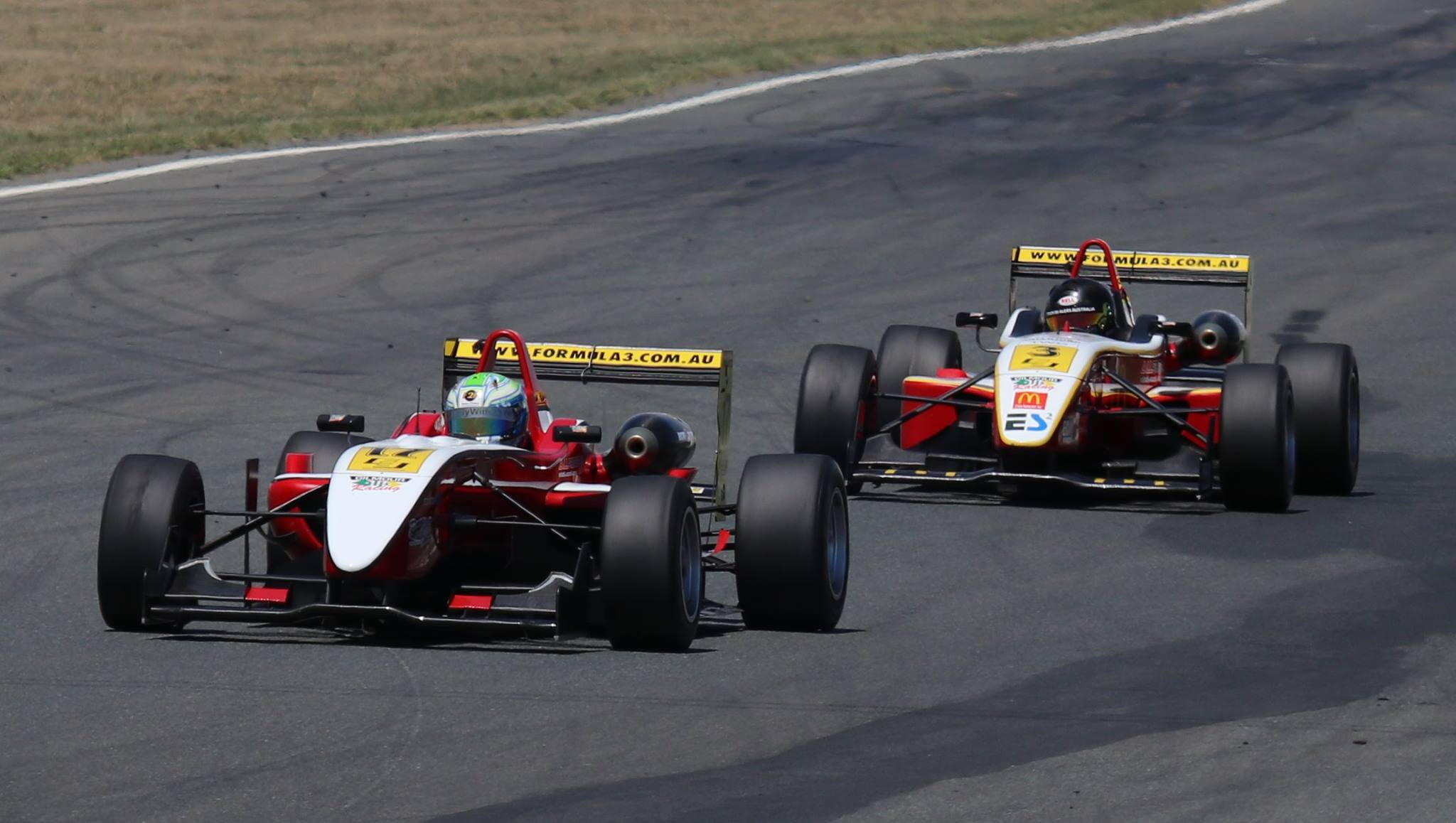
Jon Collins and Calan Williams at Wakefield Park in the non-championship event

Classes of the 2017 Australian Formula 3 Premier Series are as follows:

=== Premier Class ===
Any F3 car from 1 January 2005 to 31 December 2011 is eligible to compete in the Premier class.

=== National Class ===
Any F3 car from 1 January 2002 to 31 December 2007 is eligible to compete in the National class.

=== Trophy Class ===
Any F3 car built prior to 1 January 2005 is eligible, as are other open-wheel vehicles such as Formula 1000, Formula Ford 2000, Formula Renault, Toyota Racing Series, Formula BMW, etc.

== Teams and drivers ==
The teams and drivers of the 2017 Australian Formula 3 Premier Series All teams and drivers were Australian-registered.

Team	Chassis	Engine	No.	Driver	Class	Rounds
Jason Hore Racing	Dallara F304	Opel-Spiess	2	Jason Hore	T	1, 5
Gilmour Racing	Dallara F307	Mercedes-Benz	3	Chris Gilmour	P	1, 5
Gilmour Racing	Dallara F307	Mercedes-Benz	3	Rielly Brook	N	6
Gilmour Racing	Dallara F311	Mercedes-Benz	17	Calan Williams	P	All
Bruce McKenzie Racing	Dallara F304	Renault-Sodemo	5	Bruce McKenzie	T	5
R-Tek Motorsport	Dallara F307	Opel-Spiess	6	Roman Krumins	P	All
R-Tek Motorsport	Dallara F307	Opel-Spiess	7	Nathan Kumar	P	1–3, 5–6
R-Tek Motorsport	Dallara F311	Mercedes-Benz	8	John Magro	P	6
R-Tek Motorsport	Dallara F304	Opel-Spiess	9	Andrew Roberts	N	2, 4, 6
Jones Racing	Dallara F311	Mercedes-Benz	12	Harri Jones	P	6
Wilson Team Racing	Dallara F307	Opel Spiess	27	Shane Wilson	N	1–5
John English Racing	Van Diemen RF97	Ford	34	John English	T	4–5
Com Sec Racing	Tatuus FR2.0	Renault	43	Rielly Brook	T	1, 5
Paul Szidy Racing	Spectrum 014	Ford	71	Paul Szidy	T	4
Alpine Motor Sports	Dallara F307	Mercedes-Benz	77	John Magro	P	1–3
Alpine Motor Sports	Dallara F307	Mercedes-Benz	88	Dennie Rumble	P	4

Icon	Class
P	Premier Class
N	National Class
T	Trophy Class

== Schedule ==
The 2017 Australian Formula 3 Premier Series schedule. All races were held in Australia.

Round		Circuit	Date	Premier Class Winner	National Class Winner	Trophy Class Winner
1	R1	Morgan Park Raceway	20 May	Calan Williams	Roman Krumins	Jason Hore
1	R2	Morgan Park Raceway	21 May	John Magro	Roman Krumins	Jason Hore
1	R3	Morgan Park Raceway	21 May	Chris Gilmour	Roman Krumins	Jason Hore
2	R1	Mallala Motor Sport Park	10 June	Calan Williams	Roman Krumins	no competitors
2	R2	Mallala Motor Sport Park	11 June	Calan Williams	Roman Krumins	no competitors
2	R3	Mallala Motor Sport Park	11 June	John Magro	Roman Krumins	no competitors
3	R1	Sydney Motorsport Park	1 July	Calan Williams	Roman Krumins	no competitors
3	R2	Sydney Motorsport Park	2 July	John Magro	Roman Krumins	no competitors
3	R3	Sydney Motorsport Park	2 July	John Magro	Roman Krumins	no competitors
4	R1	Phillip Island Grand Prix Circuit	19 August	Calan Williams	Roman Krumins	John English
4	R2	Phillip Island Grand Prix Circuit	20 August	Calan Williams	Roman Krumins	John English
4	R3	Phillip Island Grand Prix Circuit	20 August	Calan Williams	Roman Krumins	Paul Zsidy
5	R1	Queensland Raceway	16 September	Calan Williams	No finishers	Jason Hore
5	R2	Queensland Raceway	17 September	Calan Williams	Shane Wilson	Jason Hore
5	R3	Queensland Raceway	17 September	Calan Williams	Shane Wilson	Jason Hore
6	R1	Wakefield Park	21 October	Calan Williams	Rielly Brook	no competitors
6	R2	Wakefield Park	22 October	John Magro	Rielly Brook	no competitors
6	R3	Wakefield Park	22 October	Harri Jones	Roman Krumins	no competitors

== Championship standings ==
Points system

Points for are awarded as follows:

Position	1st	2nd	3rd	4th	5th	6th	7th	8th	9th	10th	FL	Pole
Race 1 and 2	12	9	8	7	6	5	4	3	2	1	1	1
Race 3	20	15	12	10	8	6	4	3	2	1	1	1

=== Drivers' championship ===
Pos	Driver	MOR			MAL			SYD			PHI			QLD			WAK			Pts
Premier
1	(Australia) Calan Williams	1	Ret	DNS	1	1	2	1	2	2	1	1	1	1	1	1	1	2	2	232
2	(Australia) John Magro	3	1	2	2	Ret	1	2	1	1							2	1	3	140
3	(Australia) Nathan Kumar	5	5	7	Ret	5	4	3	3	Ret				3	3	Ret	5	5	4	106
4	(Australia) Chris Gilmour	2	Ret	1										2	2	2				63
5	(Australia) Harri Jones																7	3	1	35
6	(Australia) Dennie Rumble										3	Ret	DNS							9
National
1	(Australia) Roman Krumins	8	3	3	3	2	3	4	4	3	4	2	2	DNS	DNS	DNS	4	4	5	225
2	(Australia) Shane Wilson	6	4	6	5	4	5	5	5	4	2	3	Ret	Ret	5	4	Ret	8	6	181
3	(Australia) Andrew Roberts				4	3	Ret				7	Ret	DNS				6	7	7	54
4	(Australia) Rielly Brook																3	6	8	35
Trophy
1	(Australia) Jason Hore	4	2	4										4	4	3				88
2	(Australia) Rielly Brook	7	6	5										5	7	6				62
3	(Australia) John English										5	4	4	7	8	7				48
4	(Australia) Bruce McKenzie													6	6	5				32
5	(Australia) Paul Szidy										6	Ret	5							9
Pos	Driver	MOR			MAL			SYD			PHI			QLD			WAK			Pts

Colour	Result
Gold	Winner
Silver	Second place
Bronze	Third place
Green	Points classification
Blue	Non-points classification
Blue	Non-classified finish (NC)
Purple	Retired, not classified (Ret)
Red	Did not qualify (DNQ)
Red	Did not pre-qualify (DNPQ)
Black	Disqualified (DSQ)
White	Did not start (DNS)
White	Withdrew (WD)
White	Race cancelled (C)
Blank	Did not practice (DNP)
Blank	Did not arrive (DNA)
Blank	Excluded (EX)

== See also ==
- 2017 Australian Formula 3 Premier Series – Sporting and Technical Regulations – Version 1, www.formula3.com.au
