= 2022 Monte Carlo Formula 2 round =

Motor racing competition

(Monaco) 2022 Monte Carlo Formula 2 round
Round details
- Round 5 of 14 in the 2022 FIA Formula 2 Championship.
- Location: Circuit de Monaco, Monte-Carlo, Monaco
- Course: Temporary racing facility 3.337 km (2.074 mi)

Sprint Race
- Date: 28 May 2022
- Laps: 30
Podium
First	(Norway) Dennis Hauger	Prema Racing
Second	(India) Jehan Daruvala	Prema Racing
Third	(New Zealand) Marcus Armstrong	ART Grand Prix
Fastest lap
Driver	(Australia) Jack Doohan	Virtuosi Racing
- Time: 1:22.832 (on lap 30)

Feature Race
- Date: 29 May 2022
- Laps: 42
Pole position
Driver	(Brazil) Felipe Drugovich	MP Motorsport
Time	1:21.348	
Podium
First	(Brazil) Felipe Drugovich	MP Motorsport
Second	(France) Théo Pourchaire	ART Grand Prix
Third	(Estonia) Jüri Vips	Hitech Grand Prix
Fastest lap
Driver	(Netherlands) Richard Verschoor	Trident
- Time: 1:22.862 (on lap 32)

The 2022 Monaco FIA Formula 2 round was a motor racing event held between 27 and 29 May 2022 at the Circuit de Monaco in Monte Carlo, Monaco. It was the fifth round of the 2022 FIA Formula 2 Championship, and was held in support of the 2022 Monaco Grand Prix.

== Classification ==
=== Qualifying ===
Liam Lawson originally finished first in qualifying, but was later stripped of pole position and given a five-place grid-penalty in the Sprint Race due to failing to slow under yellow flags. Felipe Drugovich therefore inherited the pole position, his second of the season.

==== Group A ====
Pos.	No.	Driver	Team	Time	Gap	Grid
1	11	(Brazil) Felipe Drugovich	MP Motorsport	1:21.348	–	1
2	3	(Australia) Jack Doohan	Virtuosi Racing	1:21.432	+0.084	3
3	5	(New Zealand) Liam Lawson	Carlin	1:21.499	+0.151	5
4	7	(New Zealand) Marcus Armstrong	Hitech Grand Prix	1:21.734	+0.386	7
5	1	(Norway) Dennis Hauger	Prema Racing	1:21.817	+0.469	9
6	17	(Japan) Ayumu Iwasa	DAMS	1:21.902	+0.564	12
7	21	(Australia) Calan Williams	Trident	1:21.985	+0.637	14
8	9	(Denmark) Frederik Vesti	ART Grand Prix	1:22.703	+1.355	16
9	25	(Belgium) Amaury Cordeel	Van Amersfoort Racing	1:22.762	+1.414	18
10	23	(Turkey) Cem Bölükbaşı	Charouz Racing System	1:24.150	+2.802	20
Withdrew
WD	15	(Switzerland) Ralph Boschung	Campos Racing	1:21.859	+0.511	WD^{1}

==== Group B ====
Pos.	No.	Driver	Team	Time	Gap	Grid
1	10	(France) Théo Pourchaire	ART Grand Prix	1:21.535	–	2
2	8	(Estonia) Jüri Vips	Hitech Grand Prix	1:21.618	+0.083	4
3	22	(Brazil) Enzo Fittipaldi	Charouz Racing System	1:21.719	+0.184	6
4	2	(India) Jehan Daruvala	Prema Racing	1:21.928	+0.393	8
5	24	(United Kingdom) Jake Hughes	Van Amersfoort Racing	1:22.011	+0.476	10
6	16	(Israel) Roy Nissany	DAMS	1:22.017	+0.482	11
7	6	(United States) Logan Sargeant	Carlin	1:22.072	+0.537	13
8	12	(France) Clément Novalak	MP Motorsport	1:23.180	+1.645	15
9	4	(Japan) Marino Sato	Virtuosi Racing	1:23.241	+1.706	17
10	14	(United Kingdom) Olli Caldwell	Campos Racing	1:23.498	+1.963	19
107% time: 1:27.042
—	20	(Netherlands) Richard Verschoor	Trident	1:29.993	+8.438	21^{2}

Notes

- ^1 – Ralph Boschung originally qualified eleventh for both Sprint Race and Feature Race, but later withdrew from the event due to long-lasting neck problems. Thus, all drivers behind him advanced one place each at the starting grid.
- ^2 – Richard Verschoor was not able to set a time within 107% due to technical problems, but was later given permission to start both Sprint Race and the Feature Race from the back of the grid.

=== Sprint race ===
Pos.	No.	Driver	Entrant	Laps	Time/Retired	Grid	Points
1	1	(Norway) Dennis Hauger	Prema Racing	30	44:28.491	2	10
2	2	(India) Jehan Daruvala	Prema Racing	30	+6.711	3	8
3	7	(New Zealand) Marcus Armstrong	Hitech Grand Prix	30	+7.267	4	6
4	22	(Brazil) Enzo Fittipaldi	Charouz Racing System	30	+13.164	5	5
5	8	(Estonia) Jüri Vips	Hitech Grand Prix	30	+14.566	6	4
6	10	(France) Théo Pourchaire	ART Grand Prix	30	+15.829	8	3
7	3	(Australia) Jack Doohan	Virtuosi Racing	30	+17.365	7	2 (1)
8	5	(New Zealand) Liam Lawson	Carlin	30	+21.670	11^{1}	1
9	16	(Israel) Roy Nissany	DAMS	30	+22.838	10	
10	6	(United States) Logan Sargeant	Carlin	30	+23.031	12	
11	9	(Denmark) Frederik Vesti	ART Grand Prix	30	+26.356	15	
12	23	(Turkey) Cem Bölükbaşı	Charouz Racing System	30	+31.338	18	
13	20	(Netherlands) Richard Verschoor	Trident	30	+32.414	19	
14	21	(Australia) Calan Williams	Trident	30	+44.226	13	
15	4	(Japan) Marino Sato	Virtuosi Racing	30	+44.652	16	
16	14	(United Kingdom) Olli Caldwell	Campos Racing	30	+45.245	21^{2}	
17	25	(Belgium) Amaury Cordeel	Van Amersfoort Racing	30	+47.270	17	
18	24	(United Kingdom) Jake Hughes	Van Amersfoort Racing	30	+55.403	1	
19	17	(Japan) Ayumu Iwasa	DAMS	30	+55.751	20^{1}	
DNF	11	(Brazil) Felipe Drugovich	MP Motorsport	19	Mechanical	9	
DNF	12	(France) Clément Novalak	MP Motorsport	9	Collision damage	14	
WD	15	(Switzerland) Ralph Boschung	Campos Racing	—	Withdrew	—	
Fastest lap set by (Australia) Jack Doohan: 1:22.832 (lap 30)

Notes:

- ^1 – Liam Lawson and Ayumu Iwasa both received a five-place and ten-place grid-penalty respectively for failing to slow under yellow flags.
- ^2 – Olli Caldwell received a three-place grid drop for impeding Marino Sato in Qualifying.

=== Feature race ===
Pos.	No.	Driver	Entrant	Laps	Time/Retired	Grid	Points
1	11	(Brazil) Felipe Drugovich	MP Motorsport	42	1:02:35.675	1	25 (2)
2	10	(France) Théo Pourchaire	ART Grand Prix	42	+0.827	2	18
3	8	(Estonia) Jüri Vips	Hitech Grand Prix	42	+8.042	4	15
4	3	(Australia) Jack Doohan	Virtuosi Racing	42	+12.954	3	12
5	22	(Brazil) Enzo Fittipaldi	Charouz Racing System	42	+13.534	6	10
6	7	(New Zealand) Marcus Armstrong	Hitech Grand Prix	42	+14.746	7	8
7	1	(Norway) Dennis Hauger	Prema Racing	42	+15.301	9	6
8	2	(India) Jehan Daruvala	Prema Racing	42	+15.721	8	4
9	6	(United States) Logan Sargeant	Carlin	42	+16.164	13	2
10	4	(Japan) Marino Sato	Virtuosi Racing	42	+23.031	17	1
11	23	(Turkey) Cem Bölükbaşı	Charouz Racing System	42	+27.670	20	
12	20	(Netherlands) Richard Verschoor	Trident	42	+27.755	21	
13	24	(United Kingdom) Jake Hughes	Van Amersfoort Racing	42	+30.513	10	
14	9	(Denmark) Frederik Vesti	ART Grand Prix	42	+31.625	16	
15	14	(United Kingdom) Olli Caldwell	Campos Racing	42	+32.609	19	
16^{1}	21	(Australia) Calan Williams	Trident	41	Collision	14	
17^{1}	17	(Japan) Ayumu Iwasa	DAMS	41	Collision	12	
DNF	5	(New Zealand) Liam Lawson	Carlin	36	Power loss	5	
DNF	12	(France) Clément Novalak	MP Motorsport	22	Collision damage	15	
DNF	25	(Belgium) Amaury Cordeel	Van Amersfoort Racing	17	Accident	18	
DNF	16	(Israel) Roy Nissany	DAMS	13	Gearbox	11	
WD	15	(Switzerland) Ralph Boschung	Campos Racing	—	Withdrew	—	
Fastest lap set by (Netherlands) Richard Verschoor: 1:22.862 (lap 35)

Notes:

- ^1 – Calan Williams and Ayumu Iwasa collided on the final lap, but were classified as they completed more than 90% of the race distance.

== Standings after the event ==
Drivers' Championship standings

	Pos.	Driver	Points
	1	(Brazil) Felipe Drugovich	113
	2	(France) Théo Pourchaire	81
	3	(India) Jehan Daruvala	53
1	4	(New Zealand) Marcus Armstrong	50
4	5	(Estonia) Jüri Vips	49

Teams' Championship standings

	Pos.	Team	Points
	1	(Netherlands) MP Motorsport	135
	2	(France) ART Grand Prix	106
1	3	(United Kingdom) Hitech Grand Prix	99
1	4	(Italy) Prema Racing	83
2	5	(United Kingdom) Carlin	76

- Note: Only the top five positions are included for both sets of standings.

== See also ==
- 2022 Monaco Grand Prix

Previous round: 2022 Barcelona Formula 2 round	FIA Formula 2 Championship; 2022 season	Next round: 2022 Baku Formula 2 round
Previous round: 2021 Monte Carlo Formula 2 round	Monte Carlo Formula 2 round	Next round: 2023 Monte Carlo Formula 2 round
