= 2022 Baku Formula 2 round =

(Azerbaijan) 2022 Baku Formula 2 round
Round details
- Round 6 of 14 in the 2022 FIA Formula 2 Championship.
- Location: Baku City Circuit, Baku, Azerbaijan
- Course: Street Circuit; 6.003 km (3.730 mi)

Sprint Race
- Date: 11 June 2022
- Laps: 21
Podium
First	(Denmark) Frederik Vesti	ART Grand Prix
Second	(India) Jehan Daruvala	Prema Racing
Third	(New Zealand) Liam Lawson	Carlin
Fastest lap
Driver	(Norway) Dennis Hauger	Prema Racing
- Time: 1:57.308 (on lap 12)

Feature Race
- Date: 12 June 2022
- Laps: 26
Pole position
Driver	(Estonia) Jüri Vips	Hitech Grand Prix
Time	1:53.762	
Podium
First	(Norway) Dennis Hauger	Prema Racing
Second	(United States) Logan Sargeant	Carlin
Third	(Brazil) Felipe Drugovich	MP Motorsport
Fastest lap
Driver	(Estonia) Jüri Vips	Hitech Grand Prix
- Time: 1:56.429 (on lap 20)

The 2022 Baku FIA Formula 2 round was a motor racing event held between 10 and 12 June 2022 at the Baku City Circuit, Baku, Azerbaijan. It was the sixth round of the 2022 FIA Formula 2 Championship and was held in support of the 2022 Azerbaijan Grand Prix.

== Classification ==
=== Qualifying ===
Jüri Vips took his second pole position of the year for Hitech Grand Prix, ahead of fellow Red Bull Junior Team drivers Liam Lawson and Dennis Hauger.

Pos.	No.	Driver	Entrant	Time	Grid SR	Grid FR
1	8	(Estonia) Jüri Vips	Hitech Grand Prix	1:53.762	10	1
2	5	(New Zealand) Liam Lawson	Carlin	+0.163	9	2
3	1	(Norway) Dennis Hauger	Prema Racing	+0.211	8	3
4	7	(New Zealand) Marcus Armstrong	Hitech Grand Prix	+0.215	7	4
5	11	(Brazil) Felipe Drugovich	MP Motorsport	+0.238	6	5
6	20	(Netherlands) Richard Verschoor	Trident	+0.267	5	6
7	6	(United States) Logan Sargeant	Carlin	+0.432	4	7
8	2	(India) Jehan Daruvala	Prema Racing	+0.439	3	8
9	9	(Denmark) Frederik Vesti	ART Grand Prix	+0.485	2	9
10	24	(United Kingdom) Jake Hughes	Van Amersfoort Racing	+0.594	1	10
11	3	(Australia) Jack Doohan	Virtuosi Racing	+0.601	11	11
12	10	(France) Théo Pourchaire	ART Grand Prix	+0.678	12	12
13	17	(Japan) Ayumu Iwasa	DAMS	+0.721	13	13
14	16	(Israel) Roy Nissany	DAMS	+0.965	14	14
15	4	(Japan) Marino Sato	Virtuosi Racing	+0.970	15	15
16	22	(Brazil) Enzo Fittipaldi	Charouz Racing System	+0.976	16	16
17	21	(Australia) Calan Williams	Trident	+1.248	17	17
18	15	(Switzerland) Ralph Boschung	Campos Racing	+1.378	18	18
19	25	(Belgium) Amaury Cordeel	Van Amersfoort Racing	+1.559	19	19
20	12	(France) Clément Novalak	MP Motorsport	+1.694	20	20
21	23	(Turkey) Cem Bölükbaşı	Charouz Racing System	+1.970	21	21
22	14	(United Kingdom) Olli Caldwell	Campos Racing	+2.485	22	22

=== Sprint race ===
Pos.	No.	Driver	Entrant	Laps	Time/Retired	Grid	Points
1	9	(Denmark) Frederik Vesti	ART Grand Prix	21	48:36.014	2	10
2	2	(India) Jehan Daruvala	Prema Racing	21	+0.380	3	8
3	5	(New Zealand) Liam Lawson	Carlin	21	+1.102	9	6
4	7	(New Zealand) Marcus Armstrong	Hitech Grand Prix	21	+1.517	7	5
5	11	(Brazil) Felipe Drugovich	MP Motorsport	21	+1.764	6	4
6	6	(United States) Logan Sargeant	Carlin	21	+2.178	4	3
7	10	(France) Théo Pourchaire	ART Grand Prix	21	+2.668	12	2
8	17	(Japan) Ayumu Iwasa	DAMS	21	+3.246	13	1
9	24	(United Kingdom) Jake Hughes	Van Amersfoort Racing	21	+5.496	1	
10	16	(Israel) Roy Nissany	DAMS	21	+7.381	14	
11	3	(Australia) Jack Doohan	Virtuosi Racing	21	+7.573	11	
12	8	(Estonia) Jüri Vips	Hitech Grand Prix	21	+8.027	10	
13	25	(Belgium) Amaury Cordeel	Van Amersfoort Racing	21	+8.997	19	
14	12	(France) Clément Novalak	MP Motorsport	21	+9.290	20	
15	15	(Switzerland) Ralph Boschung	Campos Racing	20	Collision	18	
16	21	(Australia) Calan Williams	Trident	20	Collision	17	
17	4	(Japan) Marino Sato	Virtuosi Racing	20	Collision	15	
18	23	(Turkey) Cem Bölükbaşı	Charouz Racing System	20	Collision	21	
19	14	(United Kingdom) Olli Caldwell	Campos Racing	20	Collision	22	
20	20	(Netherlands) Richard Verschoor	Trident	18	Accident	5	
DNF	22	(Brazil) Enzo Fittipaldi	Charouz Racing System	16	Accident	16	
DNF	1	(Norway) Dennis Hauger	Prema Racing	13	Accident	8	
Fastest lap set by (Norway) Dennis Hauger: 1:57.308 (lap 12)

=== Feature race ===
The Feature Race was originally scheduled to be completed for 29 laps before the race distance was being shortened due to the maximum race time being reached after multiple Safety Car periods.

Pos.	No.	Driver	Entrant	Laps	Time/Retired	Grid	Points
1	1	(Norway) Dennis Hauger	Prema Racing	26	1:03:29.334	3	25
2	6	(United States) Logan Sargeant	Carlin	26	+0.492	7	18
3	11	(Brazil) Felipe Drugovich	MP Motorsport	26	+0.946	5	15
4	2	(India) Jehan Daruvala	Prema Racing	26	+1.664	8	12
5	20	(Netherlands) Richard Verschoor	Trident	26	+2.776	6	10
6	22	(Brazil) Enzo Fittipaldi	Charouz Racing System	26	+2.970	16	8
7	9	(Denmark) Frederik Vesti	ART Grand Prix	26	+3.149	9	6
8	4	(Japan) Marino Sato	Virtuosi Racing	26	+4.791	15	4
9	15	(Switzerland) Ralph Boschung	Campos Racing	26	+4.911	21^{1}	2
10	24	(United Kingdom) Jake Hughes	Van Amersfoort Racing	26	+5.263	10	1
11	10	(France) Théo Pourchaire	ART Grand Prix	26	+5.307	12	
12	7	(New Zealand) Marcus Armstrong	Hitech Grand Prix	26	+6.015	4	
13	3	(Australia) Jack Doohan	Virtuosi Racing	26	+6.902^{2}	11	
14	17	(Japan) Ayumu Iwasa	DAMS	26	+7.279	13	
15	5	(New Zealand) Liam Lawson	Carlin	26	+11.575	2	
16	21	(Australia) Calan Williams	Trident	26	+12.198	17	
DNF	8	(Estonia) Jüri Vips	Hitech Grand Prix	22	Accident	1	(2)
DNF	23	(Turkey) Cem Bölükbaşı	Charouz Racing System	11	Collision	20	
DNF	16	(Israel) Roy Nissany	DAMS	11	Collision	14	
DNF	12	(France) Clément Novalak	MP Motorsport	8	Mechanical	19	
DNF	25	(Belgium) Amaury Cordeel	Van Amersfoort Racing	0	Collision	18	
DNF	14	(United Kingdom) Olli Caldwell	Campos Racing	0	Collision	22	
Fastest lap set by (Estonia) Jüri Vips: 1:56.429 (lap 20)

Notes:

- ^1 – Ralph Boschung has been given a three-place grid penalty for causing a multiple car collision on the final lap of the Sprint Race.
- ^2 – Jack Doohan originally finished fifth, but was given a five-second time penalty for causing a collision with Liam Lawson, ultimately dropping him down to thirteenth place.

== Standings after the event ==
Drivers' Championship standings

	Pos.	Driver	Points
	1	(Brazil) Felipe Drugovich	132
	2	(France) Théo Pourchaire	83
	3	(India) Jehan Daruvala	73
5	4	(United States) Logan Sargeant	59
8	5	(Norway) Dennis Hauger	55

Teams' Championship standings

	Pos.	Team	Points
	1	(Netherlands) MP Motorsport	154
2	2	(Italy) Prema Racing	128
1	3	(France) ART Grand Prix	124
1	4	(United Kingdom) Hitech Grand Prix	106
	5	(United Kingdom) Carlin	103

- Note: Only the top five positions are included for both sets of standings.

== See also ==
- 2022 Azerbaijan Grand Prix

Previous round: 2022 Monte Carlo Formula 2 round	FIA Formula 2 Championship; 2022 season	Next round: 2022 Silverstone Formula 2 round
Previous round: 2021 Baku Formula 2 round	Baku Formula 2 round	Next round: 2023 Baku Formula 2 round
