= 2022 Barcelona Formula 2 round =

Car racing event

(Spain) 2022 Barcelona Formula 2 round
Round details
- Round 4 of 14 in the 2022 FIA Formula 2 Championship.
- Location: Circuit de Barcelona-Catalunya, Montmeló, Catalonia, Spain
- Course: Permanent racing facility 4.909 km (3.050 mi)

Sprint Race
- Date: 21 May 2022
- Laps: 26
Podium
First	(Brazil) Felipe Drugovich	MP Motorsport
Second	(Japan) Ayumu Iwasa	DAMS
Third	(United States) Logan Sargeant	Carlin
Fastest lap
Driver	(Brazil) Felipe Drugovich	MP Motorsport
- Time: 1:35.211 (on lap 23)

Feature Race
- Date: 22 May 2022
- Laps: 37
Pole position
Driver	(Australia) Jack Doohan	Virtuosi Racing
Time	1:28.612	
Podium
First	(Brazil) Felipe Drugovich	MP Motorsport
Second	(Australia) Jack Doohan	Virtuosi Racing
Third	(Denmark) Frederik Vesti	ART Grand Prix
Fastest lap
Driver	(Australia) Jack Doohan	Virtuosi Racing
- Time: 1:34.231 (on lap 7)

The 2022 Barcelona Formula 2 round was a motor racing event held between 20 and 22 May 2022 at the Circuit de Barcelona-Catalunya. It was the fourth round of the 2022 Formula 2 Championship and was held in support of the 2022 Spanish Grand Prix.

== Classification ==
=== Qualifying ===
Jack Doohan took his second pole position of the year for Virtuosi Racing, ahead of Jüri Vips and Frederik Vesti. Ralph Boschung was forced to miss the rest of the round due to neck pain.

Pos.	No.	Driver	Entrant	Time	Grid SR	Grid FR
1	3	(Australia) Jack Doohan	Virtuosi Racing	1:28.612	10	1
2	8	(Estonia) Jüri Vips	Hitech Grand Prix	+0.023	9	2
3	9	(Denmark) Frederik Vesti	ART Grand Prix	+0.240	8	3
4	2	(India) Jehan Daruvala	Prema Racing	+0.272	7	4
5	6	(United States) Logan Sargeant	Carlin	+0.355	6	5
6	17	(Japan) Ayumu Iwasa	DAMS	+0.365	5	6
7	10	(France) Théo Pourchaire	ART Grand Prix	+0.389	3	7
8	24	(United Kingdom) Jake Hughes	Van Amersfoort Racing	+0.455	2	8
9	21	(Australia) Calan Williams	Trident	+0.552	1	9
10	11	(Brazil) Felipe Drugovich	MP Motorsport	+0.578	4^{1}	10
11	22	(Brazil) Enzo Fittipaldi	Charouz Racing System	+0.593	11	11
12	12	(France) Clément Novalak	MP Motorsport	+0.755	12	12
13	7	(New Zealand) Marcus Armstrong	Hitech Grand Prix	+0.763	13	13
14	1	(Norway) Dennis Hauger	Prema Racing	+0.769	14	14
15	25	(Belgium) Amaury Cordeel	Van Amersfoort Racing	+0.769	15	15
16	5	(New Zealand) Liam Lawson	Carlin	+0.876	16	16
17	16	(Israel) Roy Nissany	DAMS	+0.903	17	17
18	14	(United Kingdom) Olli Caldwell	Campos Racing	+1.273	18	18
19	4	(Japan) Marino Sato	Virtuosi Racing	+1.315	19	19
20	20	(Netherlands) Richard Verschoor	Trident	+1.604	20	20
21	23	(Turkey) Cem Bölükbaşı	Charouz Racing System	+1.604	21	21
107% time: 1:34.815
—	15	(Switzerland) Ralph Boschung	Campos Racing	No time set	WD	

Notes:

- ^1 – Felipe Drugovich received a three-place grid penalty for impeding another driver during qualifying. Drugovich had one penalty point added to his license.

=== Sprint race ===
Pos.	No.	Driver	Entrant	Laps	Time/Retired	Grid	Points
1	11	(Brazil) Felipe Drugovich	MP Motorsport	26	44:12.635	4	10 (1)
2	17	(Japan) Ayumu Iwasa	DAMS	26	+2.109	5	8
3	6	(United States) Logan Sargeant	Carlin	26	+4.165	6	6
4	2	(India) Jehan Daruvala	Prema Racing	26	+8.493	7	5
5	10	(France) Théo Pourchaire	ART Grand Prix	26	+9.251	3	4
6	3	(Australia) Jack Doohan	Virtuosi Racing	26	+10.481	10	3
7	9	(Denmark) Frederik Vesti	ART Grand Prix	26	+16.430	8	2
8	22	(Brazil) Enzo Fittipaldi	Charouz Racing System	26	+17.256	11	1
9	5	(New Zealand) Liam Lawson	Carlin	26	+17.705	16	
10	7	(New Zealand) Marcus Armstrong	Hitech Grand Prix	26	+18.524	13	
11	20	(Netherlands) Richard Verschoor	Trident	26	+25.321	20	
12	1	(Norway) Dennis Hauger	Prema Racing	26	+25.997	14	
13	14	(United Kingdom) Olli Caldwell	Campos Racing	26	+26.476	18	
14	12	(France) Clément Novalak	MP Motorsport	26	+29.315	12	
15	16	(Israel) Roy Nissany	DAMS	26	+31.490	17	
16	21	(Australia) Calan Williams	Trident	26	+33.781	PL^{1}	
17	4	(Japan) Marino Sato	Virtuosi Racing	26	+37.436	19	
18	23	(Turkey) Cem Bölükbaşı	Charouz Racing System	26	+53.281	21	
19	25	(Belgium) Amaury Cordeel	Van Amersfoort Racing	26	+1:05.926	15	
20	24	(United Kingdom) Jake Hughes	Van Amersfoort Racing	24	Mechanical	2	
DNF	8	(Estonia) Jüri Vips	Hitech Grand Prix	6	Spun off	9	
WD	15	(Switzerland) Ralph Boschung	Campos Racing	—	Withdrew	—	
Fastest lap set by (Brazil) Felipe Drugovich: 1:35.211 (lap 23)

Notes:

- ^1 – Calan Williams was due to start in P1 for the Sprint Race, but stalled on the grid before the formation lap. Thus, he was forced to start from the pit lane.

=== Feature race ===
Pos.	No.	Driver	Entrant	Laps	Time/Retired	Grid	Points
1	11	(Brazil) Felipe Drugovich	MP Motorsport	37	1:02:14.874	10	25
2	3	(Australia) Jack Doohan	Virtuosi Racing	37	+5.630	1	18 (3)
3	9	(Denmark) Frederik Vesti	ART Grand Prix	37	+23.169	3	15
4	6	(United States) Logan Sargeant	Carlin	37	+24.720	5	12
5	12	(France) Clément Novalak	MP Motorsport	37	+25.060	12	10
6	22	(Brazil) Enzo Fittipaldi	Charouz Racing System	37	+31.430	11	8
7	7	(New Zealand) Marcus Armstrong	Hitech Grand Prix	37	+32.199	13	6
8	10	(France) Théo Pourchaire	ART Grand Prix	37	+35.607	7	4
9	5	(New Zealand) Liam Lawson	Carlin	37	+37.174	16	2
10	16	(Israel) Roy Nissany	DAMS	37	+37.275	17	1
11	21	(Australia) Calan Williams	Trident	37	+38.754	9	
12	17	(Japan) Ayumu Iwasa	DAMS	37	+54.848	6	
13	1	(Norway) Dennis Hauger	Prema Racing	37	+55.049	14	
14	14	(United Kingdom) Olli Caldwell	Campos Racing	37	+56.548	18	
15	25	(Belgium) Amaury Cordeel	Van Amersfoort Racing	37	+59.627	15	
16	24	(United Kingdom) Jake Hughes	Van Amersfoort Racing	37	+1:03.353	8	
17	8	(Estonia) Jüri Vips	Hitech Grand Prix	37	+1:14.803	2	
18	20	(Netherlands) Richard Verschoor	Trident	37	+1:20.062	20	
19	4	(Japan) Marino Sato	Virtuosi Racing	37	+1:30.518	15	
20	23	(Turkey) Cem Bölükbaşı	Charouz Racing System	37	+1:33.835	21	
DNF	2	(India) Jehan Daruvala	Prema Racing	2	Power loss	4	
WD	15	(Switzerland) Ralph Boschung	Campos Racing	—	Withdrew	—	
Fastest lap set by (Australia) Jack Doohan: 1:34.231 (lap 7)

== Standings after the event ==
Drivers' Championship standings

	Pos.	Driver	Points
1	1	(Brazil) Felipe Drugovich	86
1	2	(France) Théo Pourchaire	60
	3	(India) Jehan Daruvala	41
	4	(New Zealand) Liam Lawson	37
2	5	(New Zealand) Marcus Armstrong	36

Teams' Championship standings

	Pos.	Team	Points
	1	(Netherlands) MP Motorsport	108
	2	(France) ART Grand Prix	85
1	3	(United Kingdom) Carlin	73
1	4	(United Kingdom) Hitech Grand Prix	66
	5	(Italy) Prema Racing	55

- Note: Only the top five positions are included for both sets of standings.

== See also ==
- 2022 Spanish Grand Prix
- 2022 Barcelona Formula 3 round

Previous round: 2022 Imola Formula 2 round	FIA Formula 2 Championship; 2022 season	Next round: 2022 Monte Carlo Formula 2 round
Previous round: 2020 Barcelona Formula 2 round	Barcelona Formula 2 round	Next round: 2023 Barcelona Formula 2 round
