= 2022 Formula 2 Championship =

Motor racing championship

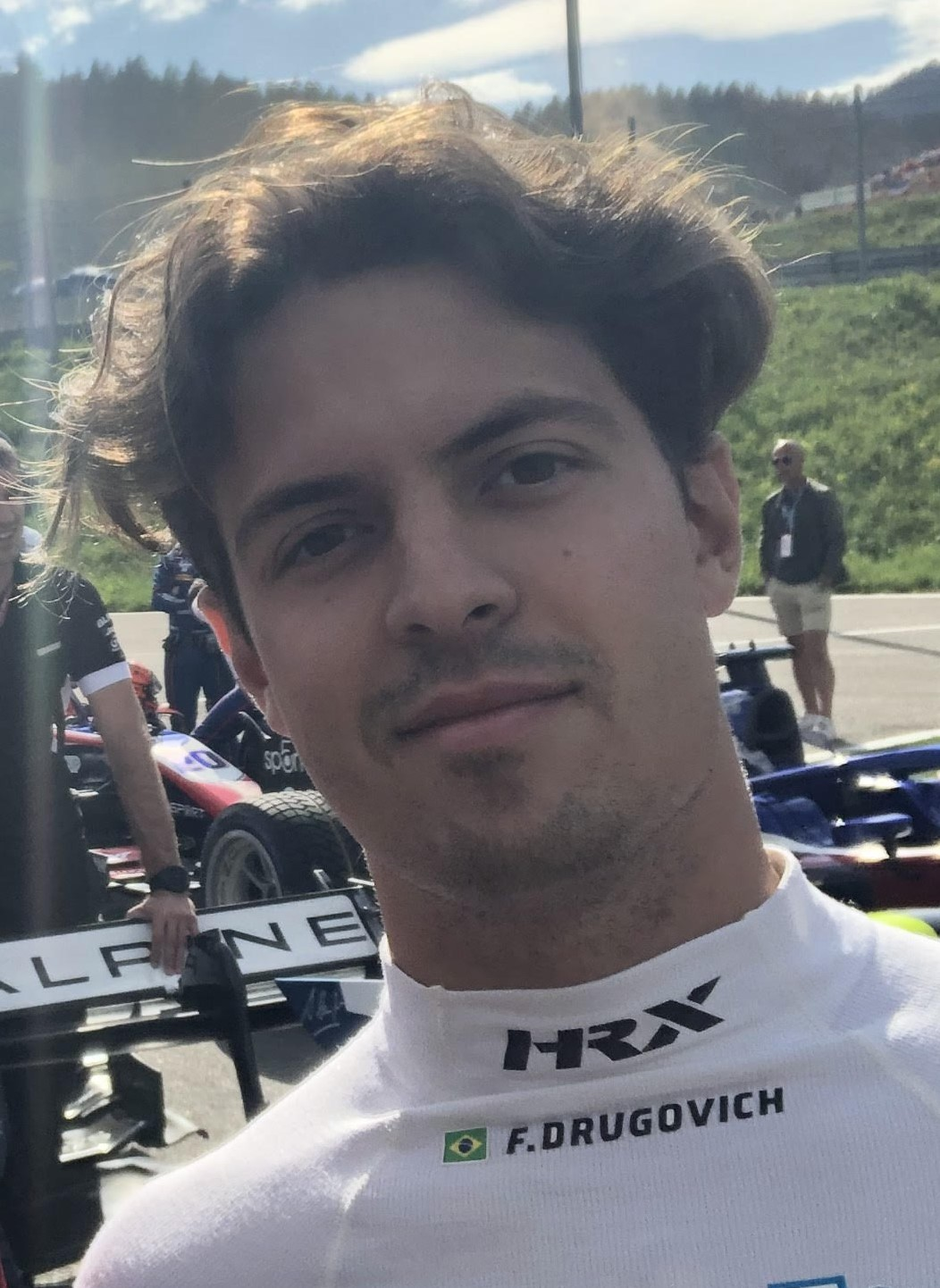
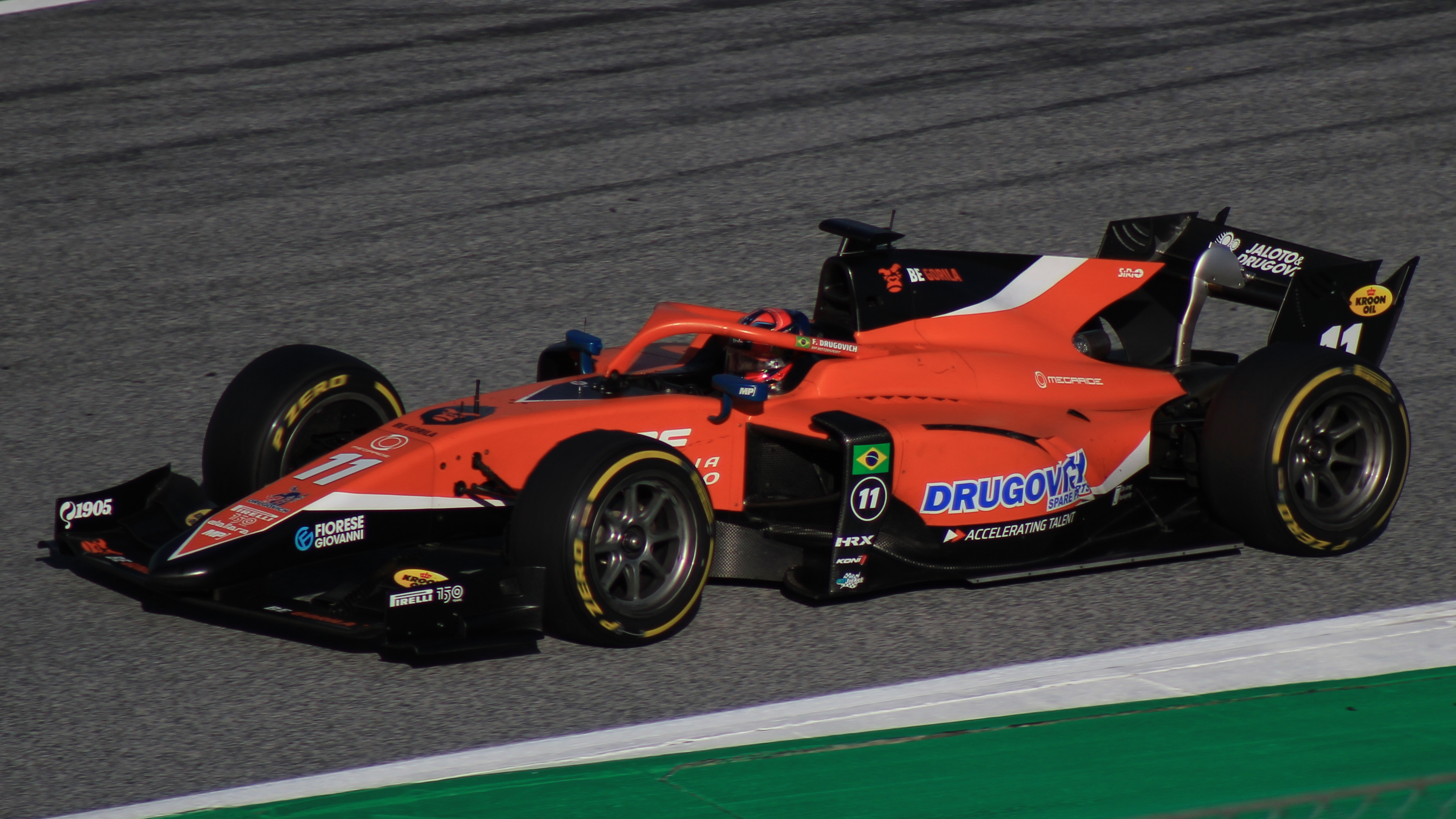
Felipe Drugovich (left) and his team, MP Motorsport (right), won the Drivers' and Teams' Championships, respectively.

The 2022 FIA Formula 2 Championship was a motor racing championship for Formula 2 cars that was sanctioned by the Fédération Internationale de l'Automobile (FIA). The championship was the fifty-sixth season of Formula 2 racing and the sixth season ran under the FIA Formula 2 Championship moniker. It was an open-wheel racing category that served as the second tier of formula racing in the FIA Global Pathway. The category ran in support of selected rounds of the 2022 FIA Formula One World Championship. As the championship was a spec series, all teams and drivers competing in the championship ran the same car, the Dallara F2 2018.

Prema Racing entered the championship as the reigning teams' champion, having secured their title at the penultimate race of the 2021 season in Saudi Arabia.

Felipe Drugovich, driving for MP Motorsport, took the drivers' championship at Monza, with three races to spare. MP Motorsport won the teams' championship at Abu Dhabi.

The season would see twelve different race winners, equalling the record previously set two years prior: champion Drugovich won five races (in Barcelona he won both races), and four races were won by Liam Lawson. Another three victories went to Théo Pourchaire, Jack Doohan and Marcus Armstrong. Ayumu Iwasa, Dennis Hauger and Logan Sargeant each scored two race wins. Jüri Vips, Frederik Vesti, Jehan Daruvala and Richard Verschoor each scored one victory during this season.

== Entries ==
The following teams and drivers were under contract to compete in the 2022 championship. As the championship was a spec series, all competitors raced with an identical Dallara F2 2018 chassis with a V6 turbo engine developed by Mecachrome. Teams competed with tyres supplied by Pirelli.

Entrant	No.	Driver name	Rounds
(Italy) Prema Racing	1	(Norway) Dennis Hauger	All
(Italy) Prema Racing	2	(India) Jehan Daruvala	All
(United Kingdom) Virtuosi Racing	3	(Australia) Jack Doohan	All
(United Kingdom) Virtuosi Racing	4	(Japan) Marino Sato	All
(United Kingdom) Carlin	5	(New Zealand) Liam Lawson	All
(United Kingdom) Carlin	6	(United States) Logan Sargeant	All
(United Kingdom) Hitech Grand Prix	7	(New Zealand) Marcus Armstrong	All
(United Kingdom) Hitech Grand Prix	8	(Estonia) Jüri Vips	All
(France) ART Grand Prix	9	(Denmark) Frederik Vesti	All
(France) ART Grand Prix	10	(France) Théo Pourchaire	All
(Netherlands) MP Motorsport	11	(Brazil) Felipe Drugovich	All
(Netherlands) MP Motorsport	12	(France) Clément Novalak	All
(Spain) Campos Racing	14	(United Kingdom) Olli Caldwell	1–10, 12–14
(Spain) Campos Racing	14	(Germany) Lirim Zendeli	11
(Spain) Campos Racing	15	(Switzerland) Ralph Boschung	1–7, 11–14
(Spain) Campos Racing	15	(Spain) Roberto Merhi	8–10
(France) DAMS	16	(Israel) Roy Nissany	1–12, 14
(France) DAMS	16	(Italy) Luca Ghiotto	13
(France) DAMS	17	(Japan) Ayumu Iwasa	All
(Italy) Trident	20	(Netherlands) Richard Verschoor	All
(Italy) Trident	21	(Australia) Calan Williams	1–13
(Italy) Trident	21	(Barbados) Zane Maloney	14
(Czech Republic) Charouz Racing System	22	(Brazil) Enzo Fittipaldi	All
(Czech Republic) Charouz Racing System	23	(Turkey) Cem Bölükbaşı	1–2, 4–10
(Czech Republic) Charouz Racing System	23	(Germany) David Beckmann	3
(Czech Republic) Charouz Racing System	23	(Colombia) Tatiana Calderón	11–14
(Netherlands) Van Amersfoort Racing	24	(United Kingdom) Jake Hughes	1–8
(Netherlands) Van Amersfoort Racing	24	(Germany) David Beckmann	9–13
(Netherlands) Van Amersfoort Racing	24	(United States) Juan Manuel Correa	14
(Netherlands) Van Amersfoort Racing	25	(Belgium) Amaury Cordeel	1–6, 8–14
(Netherlands) Van Amersfoort Racing	25	(Germany) David Beckmann	7

=== Team changes ===
After having ended their commitment in FIA Formula 3 beforehand, HWA Racelab ended their Formula 2 operations at the end of the 2021 season. Van Amersfoort Racing joined the series, taking over their entry.

Virtuosi Racing changed their name, having run with their sponsor UNI since 2019.

=== Driver changes ===
Prema Racing competed with a new driver lineup; reigning Formula 2 champion Oscar Piastri signed as a reserve driver for Alpine F1 Team and his teammate, Robert Shwartzman, exited after two years in the series to become a test driver for Scuderia Ferrari. They were replaced by reigning FIA Formula 3 champion Dennis Hauger and fellow Red Bull Junior Team driver Jehan Daruvala, who switched from Carlin.

Virtuosi Racing's Zhou Guanyu left the team and the series after three years to graduate to Formula One with Alfa Romeo Racing. Felipe Drugovich also left the team to rejoin MP Motorsport, with whom he had raced in 2020. Their seats were filled by Marino Sato, who switched from Trident, and FIA Formula 3 runner-up and new Alpine Academy driver Jack Doohan, who contested the final two rounds of Formula 2 in the previous season with MP Motorsport.

Carlin driver Dan Ticktum left the series to join NIO 333 in Formula E. Carlin hired Red Bull junior and former Hitech Grand Prix driver Liam Lawson alongside FIA Formula 3 graduate and Williams Driver Academy member Logan Sargeant – who contested the penultimate round of Formula 2 in 2021 with HWA Racelab – to replace Ticktum and the departing Jehan Daruvala.

Hitech Grand Prix signed DAMS departee Marcus Armstrong, who left the Ferrari Driver Academy, to replace Liam Lawson.

ART Grand Prix driver Christian Lundgaard left the team and the series after two seasons to join the IndyCar Series, racing for Rahal Letterman Lanigan Racing. He was replaced by FIA Formula 3 graduate and Mercedes Junior Team member Frederik Vesti.

MP Motorsport partnered Felipe Drugovich with Clément Novalak, who replaced Lirim Zendeli at the team for the final two rounds in 2021 after finishing third in FIA Formula 3.

Campos Racing hired new Alpine Academy member Olli Caldwell, who already competed with the team in the last two rounds of the 2021 season, on a full-time contract.

DAMS signed Red Bull junior and FIA Formula 3 graduate Ayumu Iwasa, who joined Roy Nissany and replaced the departing Marcus Armstrong.

Trident hired FIA Formula 3 graduate Calan Williams and Richard Verschoor, who had competed in the previous Formula 2 season with MP Motorsport and Charouz Racing System. They replaced Virtuosi-bound Marino Sato and Bent Viscaal, who left the championship to drive in the European Le Mans Series.

Charouz Racing System signed former Formula One Esports competitor and Euroformula Open graduate Cem Bölükbaşı to replace Guilherme Samaia alongside Enzo Fittipaldi.

New entrant Van Amersfoort Racing signed Jake Hughes, who joined the category full-time after making temporary appearances with HWA Racelab in 2020 and 2021. He was partnered by Amaury Cordeel, graduating from FIA Formula 3 after a single season in which he came 23rd.

==== Mid-season changes ====
Charouz Racing System driver Cem Bölükbaşı was ruled out of the third round at the Imola Circuit with a fractured rib. He was replaced by David Beckmann, who previously raced for the team during the first half of the 2021 championship.

Bölükbaşı returned to Charouz for the fourth round at the Circuit de Barcelona-Catalunya.

Van Amersfoort Racing driver Amaury Cordeel was suspended for the seventh round at Silverstone after incurring 12 penalty points across the first six rounds, the first such ban since Mahaveer Raghunathan in 2019. He was replaced by David Beckmann, who earlier in the season had filled in for the injured Bölükbaşı at Charouz.

Roberto Merhi joined the championship at the Red Bull Ring to replace Ralph Boschung after the latter had withdrawn from multiple rounds due to persisting neck injuries. Merhi had last competed in 2018, driving for Campos Racing and MP Motorsport.

Jake Hughes was forced to miss the ninth and tenth rounds due to contracting COVID-19, with David Beckmann again joining Van Amersfoort Racing to replace him. In order to prioritise his Formula E commitments, Hughes did not return to the series and Beckmann replaced him up until the season finale.

Campos Racing driver Olli Caldwell was the second driver to receive a race ban for incurring 12 penalty points and was suspended from the eleventh round at Spa-Francorchamps. He was replaced by Lirim Zendeli, who last raced in 2021 for MP Motorsport. Zendeli partnered Ralph Boschung, who returned to the series after his injury. Boschung's replacement Roberto Merhi returned to the Super GT Series. Cem Bölükbaşı terminated his contract with Charouz Racing System by mutual consent prior to the Spa-Francorchamps round, his seat being taken by IndyCar Series racer Tatiana Calderón, who returned to Formula 2 after competing for BWT Arden in 2019.

DAMS racer Roy Nissany became the third driver of 2022 to receive a race suspension for incurring 12 penalty points and was excluded from the thirteenth round at Monza. He was replaced by Luca Ghiotto, who made his first F2 appearance since the end of the 2020 season.

Trident driver Calan Williams parted ways with his team before the Yas Marina season finale. He was replaced by 2022 FIA Formula 3 Vice-champion Zane Maloney, who made his championship debut. Juan Manuel Correa returned to Formula 2 for the first time since his accident in 2019 to replace Beckmann at Van Amersfoort Racing.

== Race calendar ==
A fourteen-round calendar was announced on 15 October 2021:

Round	Circuit	Sprint race	Feature race
1	Bahrain International Circuit, Sakhir	19 March	20 March
2	(Saudi Arabia) Jeddah Corniche Circuit, Jeddah	26 March	27 March
3	(Italy) Imola Circuit, Imola	23 April	24 April
4	(Spain) Circuit de Barcelona-Catalunya, Barcelona	21 May	22 May
5	Circuit de Monaco, Monaco	28 May	29 May
6	(Azerbaijan) Baku City Circuit, Baku	11 June	12 June
7	(United Kingdom) Silverstone Circuit, Silverstone	2 July	3 July
8	(Austria) Red Bull Ring, Spielberg	9 July	10 July
9	(France) Circuit Paul Ricard, Le Castellet	23 July	24 July
10	(Hungary) Hungaroring, Mogyoród	30 July	31 July
11	(Belgium) Circuit de Spa-Francorchamps, Stavelot	27 August	28 August
12	(Netherlands) Circuit Zandvoort, Zandvoort	3 September	4 September
13	(Italy) Monza Circuit, Monza	10 September	11 September
14	(United Arab Emirates) Yas Marina Circuit, Abu Dhabi	19 November	20 November

=== Calendar changes ===
The championship returned to a two-race format for its race weekends, after coming under criticism during the 2021 season that the gaps between the rounds were far too large.

- The Imola Circuit featured on the calendar; the first time it has appeared on the F2 schedule.
- The Circuit Zandvoort also featured on the calendar after it was cancelled in 2020 and not included in 2021.
- The Barcelona, Red Bull Ring, Hungaroring and Spa-Francorchamps rounds returned after being initially dropped in 2021.
- The Sochi Autodrom was due to host a round on 24–25 September, but it was suspended in late February due to the ongoing Russian invasion of Ukraine. It was eventually cancelled the following week along with the Russian Grand Prix. On the 18th May 2022, it was announced that a round at the Circuit Paul Ricard, in support of the French Grand Prix, would replace the races at Sochi and would take place a week before the Hungaroring round.

== Regulation changes ==
=== Sporting changes ===
The number of races per round was reduced from three to two, with a 120 km/45 minute sprint race on Saturday and a 170 km/60 minute feature race with a mandatory pit stop on Sunday. Starting grids for both races were decided in one qualifying session on Friday, with the top 10 drivers having their positions reversed for the sprint race. The championship received a reprofiled scoring format. The points for pole position and fastest lap were each cut in half; now awarding 2 points for pole, and 1 for the fastest lap in each race. No points were awarded for scoring reverse-grid pole, i.e. finishing 10th in qualifying. The sprint race points were changed significantly, with 10 points being awarded for the winner, 8 points for 2nd, then 6 for 3rd, and it descends all the way to 1 point for 8th. Changes were also applied for Formula 1's other feeder series, the FIA Formula 3 Championship.

== Season report ==
=== Round 1: Bahrain ===
The season began at the Bahrain International Circuit, where Jack Doohan set the fastest time in qualifying to take pole position for the feature race. Tenth-place qualifier Felipe Drugovich started the sprint race from reverse-grid pole position, but dropped places at the start, allowing Richard Verschoor to take the lead. The race was briefly interrupted by a safety car as Marcus Armstrong stalled on track after being spun around by Jake Hughes. Verschoor maintained his lead to take Trident's first FIA Formula 2 race victory.

Pole-sitter Doohan lost the lead of the feature race to Jüri Vips at the start, but a slow pit stop later caused Vips to lose places. As Doohan left the pits after his stop, his front wing clipped Théo Pourchaire and broke, forcing him to stop again for a replacement. Pourchaire took the lead after every driver had pitted. A late-race safety car caused by a collision between Verschoor and Enzo Fittipaldi prompted some drivers to make extra pit stops. Dennis Hauger and Calan Williams were prematurely released from their pit boxes, causing both drivers to have a wheel detach and roll down the pit lane. Pourchaire held his lead at the restart to claim victory and the lead of the championship after the first round, one point ahead of Liam Lawson.

=== Round 2: Saudi Arabia ===
Felipe Drugovich took feature race pole position at the Jeddah Corniche Circuit, whilst an engine failure for championship leader Pourchaire caused him to qualify 21st. Dennis Hauger started the sprint race from pole position. The race was twice interrupted by a safety car, firstly after Amaury Cordeel crashed and secondly when Jack Doohan and Logan Sargeant collided as the race restarted. Drivers were initially ordered to follow the safety car through the pit lane, however the pit lane was closed shortly after as the two stricken cars were located at the pit entry. Amidst the confusion, race leader Hauger was the only driver to enter the pits, losing his lead and later receiving a penalty for entering the pit lane when closed. Calan Williams led the race at the restart but was soon passed by Jake Hughes, who was himself then overtaken by Liam Lawson for the race victory.

Championship leader Lawson was running in third place in the feature race before the pit stops, but a loose wheel forced him into retirement. Drugovich won the race from pole position to take his fourth Formula 2 race win. Jehan Daruvala finished on the podium having started the race fourteenth. At the conclusion of the round, Drugovich led the drivers' championship by 11 points over Lawson.

=== Round 3: Italy (Imola) ===
Jüri Vips set the fastest qualifying time at the Imola Circuit and Logan Sargeant took pole position for the sprint race. A poor start from Sargeant dropped him to fifth at the first corner, allowing Marcus Armstrong into the lead. The safety car was then briefly deployed to recover David Beckmann's car, which had spun. Armstrong held his lead for the remainder of the race to claim his second Formula 2 victory, followed by Jehan Daruvala in second and Dennis Hauger third with his first Formula 2 podium finish.

Pole-sitter Vips dropped to fourth place at the start of the feature race whilst Roy Nissany passed five cars to take the lead at the first corner. Meanwhile, a start-line collision between Jack Doohan and Dennis Hauger resulted in a safety car period to recover Hauger's car. The safety car was deployed again on lap six when Vips spun and crashed. This allowed drivers who started the race on super-soft compound tyres to pit for medium tyres and gain a time advantage. Nissany remained in the lead of this group of cars until he crashed on lap 21, after which Théo Pourchaire led the group. The race ended under safety car conditions as Liam Lawson crashed with three laps remaining. Felipe Drugovich was the final car to make a pit stop on the penultimate lap, allowing Pourchaire into the lead to take his second victory of the season. Enzo Fittipaldi finished second having started fifteenth. At the end of the round, Pourchaire led the championship by two points over Drugovich.

=== Round 4: Spain ===
Jack Doohan took his second feature race pole position in qualifying at the Circuit de Barcelona-Catalunya. Calan Williams was set to start the sprint race from pole but stalled on the formation lap and started from the back. Felipe Drugovich took the lead at the first corner and maintained this position for the rest of the race, holding off Ayumu Iwasa and Logan Sargeant at the safety car restart which was caused by Jüri Vips spinning into the gravel. Drugovich's victory allowed him to reclaim the championship lead from Théo Pourchaire, who finished fifth.

Feature race pole-sitter Doohan held the lead until he made his pit stop on lap 12. Drugovich, who started the race in tenth position, gained positions at the start and ran with the soft-compound tyres for six laps longer than Doohan. Drugovich emerged from his pit stop only two places behind Doohan. He soon passed Frederik Vesti and Dennis Hauger in the same corner and then caught and passed Doohan for the lead with ten laps remaining. Drugovich claimed his third race win of the season and Doohan and Vesti their first Formula 2 podium finishes. Drugovich's championship lead had now extended to 26 points over Pourchaire.

=== Round 5: Monaco ===
Liam Lawson initially set the fastest time in qualifying at the Circuit de Monaco, however his lap time – and that of second-fastest Ayumu Iwasa – were deleted for yellow flag procedure violations, awarding feature race pole position to Drugovich. Jake Hughes started the sprint race from pole position but stalled at the start line, allowing Dennis Hauger into the lead. Hauger held the position for the rest of the race to take his first Formula 2 victory. Championship leader Drugovich received a puncture on the opening lap and later retired from the race.

The feature race was interrupted by two safety car periods, firstly when Amaury Cordeel crashed and secondly to recover Clément Novalak's car after a collision with Lawson. Second-placed Théo Pourchaire closely followed pole-sitter Drugovich for much of the race, with the two drivers building a seven-second gap to third-placed Jüri Vips by the end. Pourchaire was ultimately unable to pass and Drugovich claimed his third victory in four races, extending his championship lead to 32 points over Pourchaire.

=== Round 6: Azerbaijan ===
Jüri Vips claimed his second feature race pole position of the season in qualifying at the Baku City Circuit. Jake Hughes started the sprint race from first place. Frederik Vesti took the lead at the start but was then passed by Jehan Daruvala after the first corner. Daruvala built a gap and held his position for much of the race, until his advantage was reduced by the first of three late-race safety cars after teammate Dennis Hauger crashed. At the restart, Enzo Fittipaldi hit the barriers whilst passing Vips at the first corner, causing the second safety car. When the race resumed, Vesti was able to retake the lead from Daruvala shortly before Richard Verschoor crashed, causing the third safety car. Racing restarted with one lap remaining. A multi-car collision at the first turn then eliminated Ralph Boschung, Calan Williams, Cem Bölükbaşı and Marino Sato from the race, which ended under yellow-flag conditions. Vesti's victory was his first in Formula 2.

Pole-sitter Vips held his lead at the start of the feature race. A collision between Amaury Cordeel and Olli Caldwell on the opening lap caused the first safety car of the race. During the first pit-stop phase, third-placed Marcus Armstrong was able to emerge ahead of Vips and Liam Lawson, aided by a slow pit stop for Lawson. Vips reclaimed the lead on the following lap. The safety car was again deployed shortly after when Roy Nissany and Cem Bölükbaşı collided and hit the barriers. A number of incidents occurred as racing resumed, with Ayumu Iwasa, Théo Pourchaire and Lawson all receiving damage. Vips crashed at the narrow castle section with six minutes of the race remaining, which then ended behind the safety car. This allowed Dennis Hauger to claim his second win of the season. The round concluded with Felipe Drugovich extending his championship lead to 49 points over Pourchaire.

=== Round 7: Great Britain ===
Logan Sargeant took his first pole position in Formula 2 at Silverstone Circuit. Jehan Daruvala started the sprint race from first place, which began in wet conditions behind the safety car. Daruvala held the lead at the start but dropped back throughout the race, handing the lead to Enzo Fittipaldi on lap five. Jack Doohan, who started fourth, soon passed both drivers to claim first place. Fifth-placed starter Ayumu Iwasa also gained positions and closed in on Doohan in the final laps, however Doohan maintained his position to take his first Formula 2 race win.

An accident involving Dennis Hauger and Roy Nissany, in which Hauger's car was launched by a sausage kerb into the halo of Nissany's car, brought out the safety car on the opening lap of the feature race. Pole-sitter Sargeant held his lead at the restart and for the rest of the race to take his first Formula 2 victory, followed by Théo Pourchaire and Liam Lawson. Championship leader Felipe Drugovich overtook Frederik Vesti for fourth place on the final lap. After the seventh round, Drugovich's championship lead stood at 42 points over second-placed Pourchaire.

=== Round 8: Austria ===
As the championship arrived at the Red Bull Ring, Frederik Vesti claimed his maiden pole position, with Marcus Armstrong starting the sprint race from the front. Armstrong led the entire race distance to take his second win of the season, followed by Théo Pourchaire and Jack Doohan, who had taken third place from Richard Verschoor at the race start.

The feature race began with a damp track. A number of drivers, the highest-starting being eighth-placed Verschoor, opted to start on slick tyres. Pole-sitter Vesti lost the lead to Jüri Vips at the start before the safety car was deployed when Armstrong and Jehan Daruvala collided. When racing resumed, the track had dried enough that the slick-tyre runners had the advantage and Verschoor passed the cars in front to take the lead. Once all drivers had made their mandatory pit stop, Verschoor led, followed by Daruvala and Roberto Merhi (who had started the race in 21st place), both of whom had also started on slick tyres. Verschoor crossed the line first, and Merhi overtook Daruvala on the penultimate lap to finish second, but was demoted to fifth by a time penalty for track limits violations. Logan Sargeant, who was disadvantaged by starting on the wet-weather tyres, recovered to finish fourth and was elevated to the podium by Merhi's penalty.

After the race, Verschoor was disqualified for failing to provide the required fuel sample to the FIA. Second-placed Daruvala was issued a penalty as his team had illegally attempted to dry the track on his grid spot before the race start. Thus, Sargeant was awarded the win. At the end of the round, Felipe Drugovich remained in the lead of the drivers' championship, 39 points ahead of Sargeant, whose victory had promoted him ahead of Pourchaire in the standings.

=== Round 9: France ===
Logan Sargeant took feature race pole position in qualifying at Circuit Paul Ricard. In the sprint race, pole-sitter Jehan Daruvala held the lead at the start. Liam Lawson, who lost second place to Marcus Armstrong at the start, retook the position three laps later and began to close up to Daruvala. The safety car was deployed on lap nine when Enzo Fittipaldi collided with Roberto Merhi and stopped on track before Amaury Cordeel hit his stricken car. Lawson overtook Daruvala for the lead with five laps remaining and claimed his second race win of the season. Théo Pourchaire, who finished third, was penalised after the race for forcing Armstrong off the track. Championship leader Drugovich inherited the podium position.

Pole-sitter Sargeant lost positions at the feature race start, allowing Jack Doohan, who started fourth, into the lead. Doohan was then overtaken by Ayumu Iwasa later on the first lap shortly before the safety car was deployed to recover the cars of Marino Sato and Marcus Armstrong, who were involved in separate incidents. Doohan and third-placed Sargeant were later taken out of podium contention; Sargeant stalled during his pit stop and was unable to restart his car, and Doohan spun during a battle with Théo Pourchaire, allowing ART Grand Prix teammates Pourchaire and Frederik Vesti onto the podium behind winner Iwasa, who took his first Formula 2 race victory. Felipe Drugovich remained in the lead of the drivers' championship after the ninth round with a 39-point advantage over Pourchaire, who had reclaimed second place after Sargeant's retirement.

=== Round 10: Hungary ===
Ayumu Iwasa qualified on pole position for the feature race at the Hungaroring. Jack Doohan qualified tenth to secure sprint race pole position. Enzo Fittipaldi briefly took the lead at the start of the sprint race, but Doohan reclaimed the position shortly after when Fittipaldi locked up his brakes. A collision at the first corner between Felipe Drugovich, Logan Sargeant and Dennis Hauger eliminated the latter two from the race. Doohan led the rest of the race to claim his second win of the season.

Pole-sitter Iwasa dropped behind Marcus Armstrong and Théo Pourchaire at the start of the feature race, but Armstrong lost positions to both drivers during the pit stops, allowing Pourchaire to lead the group. Fittipaldi, previously in fourth place, extended his stint on the soft tyres and emerged from the pits ahead of Iwasa and Armstrong. Pourchaire took the chequered flag to claim his third victory of the season. Championship leader Drugovich was the first driver to make a pit stop and lost places in the final laps as his tyres wore out, allowing Pourchaire to close his championship lead to 21 points.

=== Round 11: Belgium ===
Drugovich once again was quickest in qualifying, thus securing his third pole position, for the first time since Monaco. In the sprint race, Ralph Boschung, who missed 10 races due to a neck injury, scored his second podium of the year (and fourth overall in Formula 2 from 2017) on his return, holding off championship leader at the very end. Jehan Daruvala, who qualified second, didn't start after his engine failed, opening the door to Liam Lawson to win the sprint race. For his teammate Sargeant, it was disappointment, as his race ended in the wall, causing a safety car. Jack Doohan completed the podium, finishing second behind Lawson and ahead of Boschung. During the safety car period, many drivers pitted (including Drugovich), but were not able to convert their new tyres into a substantial advantage.

The polesitter led the first laps of the feature race, but could not create a gap over second-placed Doohan. The safety car returned in the feature race, once again for a crashed out Sargeant, making it two in two races where the safety car was deployed. On the restart, Drugovich could not hold off Doohan to take first and with it the race victory. He still increased the gap in the championship due to Théo Pourchaire's gearbox failure on lap three. Doohan won his third race of the year, ahead of championship leader Drugovich and sprint race winner Lawson, who completed the podium. Drugovich increased his championship lead to 43 points over second-placed Pourchaire.

=== Round 12: Netherlands ===
Qualifying was once again won by Felipe Drugovich, who scored 2 more points. The sprint race was largely processional, with the biggest overtake happening right at the start when Marcus Armstrong overtook reverse grid poleman Novalak. Two drivers retired, Olli Caldwell and Tatiana Calderón. The race was won by Marcus Armstrong, with Clément Novalak taking his first ever Formula 2 podium, and with Dennis Hauger completing the podium. The safety car was deployed on the final laps due to Calderón crashing out.

In the feature race, there was more drama however, the first important moment coming on the first lap where Logan Sargeant heavily crashed at Turn 7 after a bad start. The race was red-flagged and not all laps were completed due to more accidents, making the race reach its 60-minute time limit. Marino Sato nearly crashed when his wheel came off after not being properly fitted on the pitstop. On the second restart after Sato's car was evacuated, Richard Verschoor drove into the back of Jack Doohan's car, thus eliminating the Australian from the race. Novalak and Calderón had similar contact that saw their cars were badly damaged. Felipe Drugovich won his fifth race of the year, beating Verschoor and Ayumu Iwasa. Both Van Amersfoort Racing drivers David Beckmann and Amaury Cordeel came home in the points. However, Beckmann later received a penalty, stripping him of his points. Drugovich saw himself achieving the first matchball in order to decide the drivers' championship to his favor after another disappointing weekend for Pourchaire, increasing his championship lead to 69 points with two rounds to go.

=== Round 13: Italy (Monza) ===
Jack Doohan took his third pole position of the season. In the sprint race, Jüri Vips was challenged at the start, but dominated the rest of the race to win the first race on Saturday. Vips' first win of the season marked his best result since being dropped by the Red Bull Academy in June. The podium was completed by Vesti and Daruvala. Drugovich became champion after his main rival Théo Pourchaire was penalised and classified only 17th and last in the race. For the Brazilian driver the race was rather short, as he made contact at the start, sustaining suspension damage that forced him to retire. His MP Motorsport teammate Novalak also retired due to contact with Ralph Boschung on lap seven, with both cars sustaining damage. There was one full safety car deployment, when Olli Caldwell and Tatiana Calderón collided on lap one.

On Sunday, Calderón withdrew from the feature race due to her injuries. The race was affected by a big crash at the start: both Campos drivers, Pourchaire and the returning Luca Ghiotto all came together, while Doohan and Logan Sargeant had a separate crash, eliminating both from the race. This meant after just two laps, seven drivers had already retired from the race. On lap six, another safety car was deployed due to Calan Williams's crash. The race was then red-flagged to repair the barriers. After the restart, Daruvala comfortably held a gap and won a race for the first time this season. Vesti and Enzo Fittipaldi completed the podium, after Iwasa was disqualified for a technical infringement. Champion Drugovich finished in sixth place between both Van Amersfoort Racing drivers Beckmann and Cordeel, another double points finish after Zandvoort, and with no penalties issued this time, allowing both to keep their places.

=== Round 14: Abu Dhabi ===
Ahead of the final Formula 2 race of 2022, Williams Racing Team Principal and CEO Jost Capito announced that Carlin driver Logan Sargeant would be promoted from the Williams Driver Academy to a Formula One race seat with the team in 2023 if he secured enough points to qualify for an FIA Super Licence. Having already accumulated 29 Super Licence points before the Abu Dhabi race weekend, Sargeant needed to finish at least fifth in the 2022 FIA Formula 2 Drivers' Championship (or sixth, without receiving any penalty points).

Several changes were made to teams' driver line-ups for the Abu Dhabi race weekend. Trident driver Calan Williams was replaced by 2022 FIA Formula 3 vice-champion Zane Maloney, who would make his Formula 2 race debut. Additionally, Juan Manuel Correa returned to Formula 2 with Van Amersfoort Racing, competing in the series for the first time since his accident in 2019.

The 2022 FIA Formula 2 Teams' Championship had yet to be decided ahead of the final race of the season, with MP Motorsport, ART Grand Prix, and Carlin in contention for the title. Both MP Motorsport and ART Grand Prix were level on points, with the Dutch team ahead on countback due to having a greater number of race wins. Carlin were third in the standings, twenty-three points behind the other title contenders.

Despite having a lap time deleted mere minutes before qualifying ended, Ayumu Iwasa managed to secure pole position in a qualifying session which was shortened due to red flags. His teammate at DAMS, Roy Nissany, qualified second.

Richard Verschoor started the sprint race from pole; however, he crossed the line in second place after being passed by Liam Lawson, who went on to win the race. Felipe Drugovich made up four places to finish in third after starting from seventh place on the grid. The sprint race was red-flagged midway through lap one after Enzo Fittipaldi and Jehan Daruvala collided. This allowed Logan Sargeant to take the rolling restart from sixth, despite having originally dropped to ninth at the start of the sprint race.

Ayumu Iwasa won the feature race from pole position after battling Felipe Drugovich, whose second-place finish secured MP Motorsport the 2022 Teams' Championship. Liam Lawson finished in third place, allowing Carlin to overtake ART Grand Prix to finish second in the teams' standings. A virtual safety car was deployed after Campos driver Ralph Boschung made contact with Juan Manuel Correa, causing the Swiss driver to retire from the race. Jack Doohan was forced to retire from the race after his front left tyre detached following a late pit stop, resulting in him dropping to sixth in the drivers' standings. Theo Pourchaire also retired from the race after suffering from a terminal mechanical issue.

Sargeant's fifth-place finish in the feature race meant he finished fourth in the championship standings, one point behind his teammate Liam Lawson. This meant that he had accrued enough Super Licence points to ensure his promotion to Formula One in 2023.

== Results and standings ==
=== Season summary ===
Round		Circuit	Pole position	Fastest lap	Winning driver	Winning team	Report
1	S	Bahrain International Circuit		(Belgium) Amaury Cordeel	(Netherlands) Richard Verschoor	(Italy) Trident	Report
1	F	Bahrain International Circuit	(Australia) Jack Doohan	(Estonia) Jüri Vips	(France) Théo Pourchaire	(France) ART Grand Prix	Report
2	S	(Saudi Arabia) Jeddah Corniche Circuit		(Estonia) Jüri Vips	(New Zealand) Liam Lawson	(United Kingdom) Carlin	Report
2	F	(Saudi Arabia) Jeddah Corniche Circuit	(Brazil) Felipe Drugovich	(Australia) Jack Doohan	(Brazil) Felipe Drugovich	(Netherlands) MP Motorsport	Report
3	S	(Italy) Imola Circuit		(Estonia) Jüri Vips	(New Zealand) Marcus Armstrong	(United Kingdom) Hitech Grand Prix	Report
3	F	(Italy) Imola Circuit	(Estonia) Jüri Vips	(India) Jehan Daruvala	(France) Théo Pourchaire	(France) ART Grand Prix	Report
4	S	(Spain) Circuit de Barcelona-Catalunya		(Brazil) Felipe Drugovich	(Brazil) Felipe Drugovich	(Netherlands) MP Motorsport	Report
4	F	(Spain) Circuit de Barcelona-Catalunya	(Australia) Jack Doohan	(Australia) Jack Doohan	(Brazil) Felipe Drugovich	(Netherlands) MP Motorsport	Report
5	S	Circuit de Monaco		(Australia) Jack Doohan	(Norway) Dennis Hauger	(Italy) Prema Racing	Report
5	F	Circuit de Monaco	(Brazil) Felipe Drugovich (Note: Liam Lawson set the fastest time in qualifying, but his lap time – and that of second-fastest Ayumu Iwasa – were deleted for yellow flag procedure violations. Drugovich was promoted to pole position in their place.)	(Netherlands) Richard Verschoor	(Brazil) Felipe Drugovich	(Netherlands) MP Motorsport	Report
6	S	(Azerbaijan) Baku City Circuit		(Norway) Dennis Hauger	(Denmark) Frederik Vesti	(France) ART Grand Prix	Report
6	F	(Azerbaijan) Baku City Circuit	(Estonia) Jüri Vips	(Estonia) Jüri Vips	(Norway) Dennis Hauger	(Italy) Prema Racing	Report
7	S	(United Kingdom) Silverstone Circuit		(Japan) Ayumu Iwasa	(Australia) Jack Doohan	(United Kingdom) Virtuosi Racing	Report
7	F	(United Kingdom) Silverstone Circuit	(United States) Logan Sargeant	(Germany) David Beckmann	(United States) Logan Sargeant	(United Kingdom) Carlin	Report
8	S	(Austria) Red Bull Ring		(Brazil) Felipe Drugovich	(New Zealand) Marcus Armstrong	(United Kingdom) Hitech Grand Prix	Report
8	F	(Austria) Red Bull Ring	(Denmark) Frederik Vesti	(Australia) Jack Doohan	(United States) Logan Sargeant (Note: Richard Verschoor finished first on the track, but was disqualified as his team was unable to provide a sufficient fuel sample. Roberto Merhi and Jehan Daruvala, second and third on the road respectively, were also penalised, so Sargeant inherited the win.)	(United Kingdom) Carlin	Report
9	S	(France) Circuit Paul Ricard		(New Zealand) Liam Lawson	(New Zealand) Liam Lawson	(United Kingdom) Carlin	Report
9	F	(France) Circuit Paul Ricard	(United States) Logan Sargeant	(Brazil) Felipe Drugovich	(Japan) Ayumu Iwasa	(France) DAMS	Report
10	S	(Hungary) Hungaroring		(Netherlands) Richard Verschoor	(Australia) Jack Doohan	(United Kingdom) Virtuosi Racing	Report
10	F	(Hungary) Hungaroring	(Japan) Ayumu Iwasa	(Norway) Dennis Hauger	(France) Théo Pourchaire	(France) ART Grand Prix	Report
11	S	(Belgium) Circuit de Spa-Francorchamps		(New Zealand) Liam Lawson	(New Zealand) Liam Lawson	(United Kingdom) Carlin	Report
11	F	(Belgium) Circuit de Spa-Francorchamps	(Brazil) Felipe Drugovich	(India) Jehan Daruvala	(Australia) Jack Doohan	(United Kingdom) Virtuosi Racing	Report
12	S	(Netherlands) Circuit Zandvoort		(Brazil) Felipe Drugovich	(New Zealand) Marcus Armstrong	(United Kingdom) Hitech Grand Prix	Report
12	F	(Netherlands) Circuit Zandvoort	(Brazil) Felipe Drugovich	(Denmark) Frederik Vesti	(Brazil) Felipe Drugovich	(Netherlands) MP Motorsport	Report
13	S	(Italy) Monza Circuit		(Norway) Dennis Hauger	(Estonia) Jüri Vips	(United Kingdom) Hitech Grand Prix	Report
13	F	(Italy) Monza Circuit	(Australia) Jack Doohan	(Netherlands) Richard Verschoor	(India) Jehan Daruvala	(Italy) Prema Racing	Report
14	S	(United Arab Emirates) Yas Marina Circuit		(New Zealand) Liam Lawson	(New Zealand) Liam Lawson	(United Kingdom) Carlin	Report
14	F	(United Arab Emirates) Yas Marina Circuit	(Japan) Ayumu Iwasa	(France) Clément Novalak	(Japan) Ayumu Iwasa	(France) DAMS	Report

=== Scoring system ===
Points were awarded to the top eight classified finishers in the Sprint race, and to the top ten classified finishers in the Feature race. The pole-sitter in the feature race also received two points, and one point was given to the driver who sets the fastest lap in both the feature and sprint races if that driver finished inside the top ten. No point was awarded if the fastest lap time was achieved by a driver who was classified outside the top ten. No extra points were awarded to the pole-sitter in the sprint race as the grid for it was set by reversing the top ten qualifiers.

Sprint race points

Points were awarded to the top eight classified finishers, excluding the fastest lap point which was given to the top ten classified finishers.

Position	1st	2nd	3rd	4th	5th	6th	7th	8th	FL
Points	10	8	6	5	4	3	2	1	1

Feature race points

Points were awarded to the top ten classified finishers. Bonus points were awarded to the pole-sitter and to the driver who set the fastest lap and finished in the top ten.

Position	1st	2nd	3rd	4th	5th	6th	7th	8th	9th	10th	Pole	FL
Points	25	18	15	12	10	8	6	4	2	1	2	1

=== Drivers' championship ===
Pos.	Driver	BHR (Bahrain)		JDH (Saudi Arabia)		IMO (Italy)		CAT (Spain)		MON (Monaco)		BAK (Azerbaijan)		SIL (United Kingdom)		RBR (Austria)		LEC (France)		HUN (Hungary)		SPA (Belgium)		ZAN (Netherlands)		MNZ (Italy)		YMC (United Arab Emirates)		Points
Pos.	Driver	SR	FR	SR	FR	SR	FR	SR	FR	SR	FR	SR	FR	SR	FR	SR	FR	SR	FR	SR	FR	SR	FR	SR	FR	SR	FR	SR	FR	Points
1	(Brazil) Felipe Drugovich	5	6	3	1^{P}	5	10	1^{F}	1	Ret	1^{P}	5	3	5	4	4^{F}	11	3	4^{F}	4	9	4	2^{P}	10^{F}	1^{P}	Ret	6	3	2	265
2	(France) Théo Pourchaire	Ret	1	13	Ret	7	1	5	8	6	2	7	11	4	2	2	13	7	2	9	1	6	Ret	20	9	17	Ret	9	19†	164
3	(New Zealand) Liam Lawson	3	2	1	Ret	8	Ret	9	9	8	Ret	3	15	20	3	Ret	10	1^{F}	6	6	7	1^{F}	3	4	12	5	13	1^{F}	3	149
4	(United States) Logan Sargeant	6	7	Ret	12	6	7	3	4	10	9	6	2	7	1^{P}	7	1	8	Ret^{P}	Ret	10	Ret	5	8	Ret	4	Ret	6	5	148
5	(Japan) Ayumu Iwasa	8	16	6	7	9	5	2	12	19	17†	8	14	2^{F}	12	10	7	6	1	8	3^{P}	9	7	6	3	16	DSQ	13	1^{P}	141
6	(Australia) Jack Doohan	10	10^{P}	Ret	9^{F}	11	Ret	6	2^{P F}	7^{F}	4	11	13	1	9	3	19^{F}	4	5	1	Ret	2	1	9	Ret	6	Ret^{P}	7	Ret	128
7	(India) Jehan Daruvala	2	12	7	3	2	9^{F}	4	Ret	2	8	2	4	8	7	11	12	2	7	17	11	DNS	20^{F}	16	10	3	1	Ret	13	126
8	(Brazil) Enzo Fittipaldi	11	13	10	11	12	2	8	6	4	5	Ret	6	3	11	8	2	Ret	10	3	2	13	10	13	5	12	3	Ret	14	126
9	(Denmark) Frederik Vesti	13	Ret	12	18†	10	6	7	3	11	14	1	7	6	5	12	14^{P}	5	3	5	4	15	11	11	15^{F}	2	2	11	11	117
10	(Norway) Dennis Hauger	9	19†	16	6	3	Ret	12	13	1	7	Ret^{F}	1	15	Ret	9	4	12	16	Ret	19^{F}	10	12	3	4	9^{F}	4	4	4	115
11	(Estonia) Jüri Vips	7	3^{F}	2^{F}	10	15^{F}	Ret^{P}	Ret	17	5	3	12	Ret^{P F}	12	6	5	8	11	12	2	5	14	8	5	7	1	10	12	8	114
12	(Netherlands) Richard Verschoor	1	Ret	5	2	13	14	11	18	13	12^{F}	20†	5	10	14	6	DSQ	NC	17†	18^{F}	8	5	4	7	2	8	9^{F}	2	7	103
13	(New Zealand) Marcus Armstrong	Ret	5	Ret	5	1	16	10	7	3	6	4	12	9	8	1	Ret	14	Ret	7	6	7	13	1	14	10	12	10	9	93
14	(France) Clément Novalak	18	Ret	11	14	19	4	14	5	Ret	Ret	14	Ret	13	13	15	17	17	8	20	12	17	9	2	Ret	Ret	8	14	12^{F}	40
15	(Switzerland) Ralph Boschung	4	4	15	15	Ret	3	WD	WD	WD	WD	15†	9	WD	WD							3	14	17	17	Ret	Ret	17	Ret	40
16	(United Kingdom) Jake Hughes	Ret	9	DSQ	4	18	12	20†	16	18	13	9	10	11	10	16	5													26
17	(Belgium) Amaury Cordeel	17^{F}	15	Ret	WD	DNS	17	19	15	17	Ret	13	Ret			18	18	Ret	15	13	17	18	17	12	6	15	7	5	6	26
18	(Germany) David Beckmann					Ret	8							16	19^{F}			10	14	12	14	8	6	14	13	7	5			25
19	(Israel) Roy Nissany	12	8	9	8	4	Ret	15	10	9	Ret	10	Ret	14	Ret	13	9	16	9	19	18	11	19	15	16			8	10	20
20	(Spain) Roberto Merhi															19†	3	Ret	Ret	14	Ret									15
21	(United Kingdom) Olli Caldwell	19†	17	14	16	17	13	13	14	16	15	19	Ret	18	17	17	6	18	13	10	20†			Ret	8	Ret	Ret	16	20†	12
22	(Japan) Marino Sato	16	11	8	17	16	11	17	19	15	10	17†	8	Ret	15	Ret	16	9	Ret	15	15	12	15	19	Ret	11	11	19	15	6
23	(Australia) Calan Williams	15	18†	4	13	14	15	16	11	14	16†	16†	16	17	16	14	15	13	11	11	16	16	16	18	11	14	Ret			5
24	(Turkey) Cem Bölükbaşı	14	14	WD	WD			18	20	12	11	18†	Ret	19	18	NC	Ret	15	Ret	16	13									0
25	(Italy) Luca Ghiotto																									13	Ret			0
26	(Barbados) Zane Maloney																											15	16	0
27	(United States) Juan Manuel Correa																											18	17	0
28	(Colombia) Tatiana Calderón																					19	18	Ret	Ret	Ret	DNS	20	18	0
29	(Germany) Lirim Zendeli																					20	21†							0
Pos.	Driver	SR	FR	SR	FR	SR	FR	SR	FR	SR	FR	SR	FR	SR	FR	SR	FR	SR	FR	SR	FR	SR	FR	SR	FR	SR	FR	SR	FR	Points
Pos.	Driver	BHR (Bahrain)		JDH (Saudi Arabia)		IMO (Italy)		CAT (Spain)		MON (Monaco)		BAK (Azerbaijan)		SIL (United Kingdom)		RBR (Austria)		LEC (France)		HUN (Hungary)		SPA (Belgium)		ZAN (Netherlands)		MNZ (Italy)		YMC (United Arab Emirates)		Points

Key
Colour	Result
Gold	Winner
Silver	Second place
Bronze	Third place
Green	Other points position
Blue	Other classified position
Blue	Not classified, finished (NC)
Purple	Not classified, retired (Ret)
Red	Did not qualify (DNQ)
Black	Disqualified (DSQ)
White	Did not start (DNS)
White	Race cancelled (C)
Blank	Did not practice (DNP)
Blank	Excluded (EX)
Blank	Did not arrive (DNA)
Blank	Withdrawn (WD)
Blank	Did not enter (empty cell)
Annotation	Meaning
P	Pole position
F	Fastest lap

Notes:

- † – Drivers did not finish the race, but were classified as they completed more than 90% of the race distance.

=== Teams' championship ===
Pos.	Team	BHR (Bahrain)		JDH (Saudi Arabia)		IMO (Italy)		CAT (Spain)		MON (Monaco)		BAK (Azerbaijan)		SIL (United Kingdom)		RBR (Austria)		LEC (France)		HUN (Hungary)		SPA (Belgium)		ZAN (Netherlands)		MNZ (Italy)		YMC (United Arab Emirates)		Points
Pos.	Team	SR	FR	SR	FR	SR	FR	SR	FR	SR	FR	SR	FR	SR	FR	SR	FR	SR	FR	SR	FR	SR	FR	SR	FR	SR	FR	SR	FR	Points
1	(Netherlands) MP Motorsport	5	6	3	1^{P}	5	4	1^{F}	1	Ret	1^{P}	5	3	5	4	4^{F}	11	3	4^{F}	4	9	4	2^{P}	2	1^{P}	Ret	6	3	2	305
1	(Netherlands) MP Motorsport	18	Ret	11	14	19	10	14	5	Ret	Ret	14	Ret	13	13	15	17	17	8	20	12	20	9	10^{F}	Ret	Ret	8	14	12^{F}	305
2	(United Kingdom) Carlin	3	2	1	12	6	7	3	4	8	9	3	2	7	1^{P}	7	1	1^{F}	6	6	7	1^{F}	3	4	12	4	13	1^{F}	3	297
2	(United Kingdom) Carlin	6	7	Ret	Ret	8	Ret	9	9	10	Ret	6	15	20	3	Ret	10	8	Ret^{P}	Ret	10	Ret	5	8	Ret	5	Ret	6	5	297
3	(France) ART Grand Prix	13	1	12	18†	7	1	5	3	6	2	1	7	4	2	2	13	5	2	9	1	6	11	11	9	2	2	9	11	281
3	(France) ART Grand Prix	Ret	Ret	13	Ret	10	6	7	8	11	14	7	11	6	5	12	14^{P}	7	3	5	4	19	Ret	20	15^{F}	17	Ret	11	19†	281
4	(Italy) Prema Racing	2	12	7	3	2	9^{F}	4	13	1	7	2	1	8	7	9	4	2	7	17	11	10	12	3	4	3	1	4	4	241
4	(Italy) Prema Racing	9	19†	16	6	3	Ret	12	Ret	2	8	Ret^{F}	4	15	Ret	11	12	12	16	Ret	19^{F}	DNS	20^{F}	16	10	9^{F}	4	Ret	13	241
5	(United Kingdom) Hitech Grand Prix	7	3^{F}	2^{F}	5	1	16	10	7	3	3	4	12	9	6	1	8	11	12	2	5	7	8	1	7	1	10	10	8	207
5	(United Kingdom) Hitech Grand Prix	Ret	5	Ret	10	15^{F}	Ret^{P}	Ret	17	5	6	12	Ret^{P F}	12	8	5	Ret	14	Ret	7	6	13	13	5	14	10	12	12	9	207
6	(France) DAMS	8	8	6	7	4	5	2	10	9	17†	8	14	2^{F}	12	10	7	6	1	8	3^{P}	9	7	6	3	13	Ret	8	1^{P}	161
6	(France) DAMS	12	16	9	8	9	Ret	15	12	19	Ret	10	Ret	14	Ret	13	9	16	9	19	18	11	19	15	16	16	DSQ	13	10	161
7	(United Kingdom) Virtuosi Racing	10	10^{P}	8	9^{F}	11	11	6	2^{P F}	7^{F}	4	11	8	1	9	3	16	4	5	1	15	2	1	9	Ret	6	11	7	15	134
7	(United Kingdom) Virtuosi Racing	16	11	Ret	17	16	Ret	17	19	15	10	17†	13	Ret	15	Ret	19^{F}	9	Ret	15	Ret	12	15	19	Ret	11	Ret^{P}	19	Ret	134
8	(Czech Republic) Charouz Racing System	11	13	10	11	12	2	8	6	4	5	18†	6	3	11	8	2	15	10	3	2	13	10	13	5	12	3	20	14	130
8	(Czech Republic) Charouz Racing System	14	14	WD	WD	Ret	8	18	20	12	11	Ret	Ret	19	18	NC	Ret	Ret	Ret	16	13	19	18	Ret	Ret	Ret	DNS	Ret	18	130
9	(Italy) Trident	1	18†	4	2	13	14	11	11	13	12^{F}	16†	5	10	14	6	15	13	11	11	8	5	4	7	2	8	9^{F}	2	7	108
9	(Italy) Trident	15	Ret	5	13	14	15	16	18	14	16†	20†	16	17	16	14	DSQ	NC	17†	18^{F}	16	16	16	18	11	14	Ret	15	16	108
10	(Netherlands) Van Amersfoort Racing	17^{F}	9	Ret	4	18	12	19	15	17	13	9	10	11	10	16	5	10	14	12	14	8	6	12	6	7	5	5	6	73
10	(Netherlands) Van Amersfoort Racing	Ret	15	DSQ	WD	DNS	17	20†	16	18	Ret	13	Ret	16	19^{F}	18	18	Ret	15	13	17	18	17	14	13	15	7	18	17	73
11	(Spain) Campos Racing	4	4	14	15	17	3	13	14	16	15	15†	9	18	17	17	3	18	13	10	20†	3	14	17	8	Ret	Ret	16	20†	67
11	(Spain) Campos Racing	19†	17	15	16	Ret	13	WD	WD	WD	WD	19	Ret	WD	WD	19†	6	Ret	Ret	14	Ret	20	21†	Ret	17	Ret	Ret	17	Ret	67
Pos.	Team	SR	FR	SR	FR	SR	FR	SR	FR	SR	FR	SR	FR	SR	FR	SR	FR	SR	FR	SR	FR	SR	FR	SR	FR	SR	FR	SR	FR	Points
Pos.	Team	BHR (Bahrain)		JDH (Saudi Arabia)		IMO (Italy)		CAT (Spain)		MON (Monaco)		BAK (Azerbaijan)		SIL (United Kingdom)		RBR (Austria)		LEC (France)		HUN (Hungary)		SPA (Belgium)		ZAN (Netherlands)		MNZ (Italy)		YMC (United Arab Emirates)		Points

Key
Colour	Result
Gold	Winner
Silver	Second place
Bronze	Third place
Green	Other points position
Blue	Other classified position
Blue	Not classified, finished (NC)
Purple	Not classified, retired (Ret)
Red	Did not qualify (DNQ)
Black	Disqualified (DSQ)
White	Did not start (DNS)
White	Race cancelled (C)
Blank	Did not practice (DNP)
Blank	Excluded (EX)
Blank	Did not arrive (DNA)
Blank	Withdrawn (WD)
Blank	Did not enter (empty cell)
Annotation	Meaning
P	Pole position
F	Fastest lap
