= 2020 Spa-Francorchamps Formula 3 round =

Motor racing event

(Belgium) 2020 Spa-Francorchamps Formula 3 round
Round details
- Round 7 of 9 in the 2020 FIA Formula 3 Championship.
- Layout of the Spa-Francorchamps Circuit
- Location: Circuit de Spa-Francorchamps; Stavelot, Belgium
- Course: Permanent racing facility 7.004 km (4.352 mi)

Feature Race
- Date: 29 August 2020
- Laps: 17
Pole position
Driver	(Germany) Lirim Zendeli	Trident
Time	2:05.393	
Podium
First	(Germany) Lirim Zendeli	Trident
Second	(France) Théo Pourchaire	ART Grand Prix
Third	(Australia) Oscar Piastri	Prema Racing
Fastest lap
Driver	(United Kingdom) Jake Hughes	HWA Racelab
- Time: 2:07.040 (on lap 7)

Sprint Race
- Date: 30 August 2020
- Laps: 17
Podium
First	(United States) Logan Sargeant	Prema Racing
Second	(Denmark) Frederik Vesti	Prema Racing
Third	(Russia) Aleksandr Smolyar	ART Grand Prix
Fastest lap
Driver	(United States) Logan Sargeant	Prema Racing
- Time: 2:06.865 (on lap 3)

The 2020 Spa-Francorchamps FIA Formula 3 round was a motor racing event held on 29 and 30 August 2020 at the Circuit de Spa-Francorchamps in Stavelot, Belgium. It was the seventh round of the 2020 FIA Formula 3 Championship, and ran in support of the 2020 Belgian Grand Prix.

== Entries ==
Max Fewtrell left Hitech Grand Prix after the Barcelona round. He was replaced by Frenchman and series rookie Pierre-Louis Chovet. At Carlin Buzz Racing, David Schumacher was hired as a full-time driver, leaving Charouz Racing System to replace the German with Michael Belov. Finally, Sophia Flörsch could not attend the Spa round due to her commitments in the European Le Mans Series, and was replaced by Euroformula Open driver Andreas Estner at Campos.

== Classification ==
=== Qualifying ===
The Qualifying session took place on 28 August 2020, with Lirim Zendeli scoring pole position.

Pos.	No.	Driver	Team	Time/Gap	Grid
1	10	(Germany) Lirim Zendeli	Trident	2:05.393	1
2	7	(France) Théo Pourchaire	ART Grand Prix	+0.203	2
3	8	(Russia) Aleksandr Smolyar	ART Grand Prix	+0.414	3
4	3	(United States) Logan Sargeant	Prema Racing	+0.686	4
5	11	(Germany) David Beckmann	Trident	+0.719	5
6	17	(Netherlands) Richard Verschoor	MP Motorsport	+0.751	6
7	5	(New Zealand) Liam Lawson	Hitech Grand Prix	+0.779	7
8	1	(Australia) Oscar Piastri	Prema Racing	+0.813	8
9	2	(Denmark) Frederik Vesti	Prema Racing	+0.922	9
10	29	(Australia) Alex Peroni	Campos Racing	+1.020	10
11	12	(United Kingdom) Olli Caldwell	Trident	+1.051	11
12	15	(United Kingdom) Jake Hughes	HWA Racelab	+1.075	12
13	16	(Australia) Jack Doohan	HWA Racelab	+1.112	13
14	22	(Italy) Matteo Nannini	Jenzer Motorsport	+1.195	14
15	14	(Brazil) Enzo Fittipaldi	HWA Racelab	+1.365	15
16	9	(Venezuela) Sebastián Fernández	ART Grand Prix	+1.474	16
17	21	(Italy) Federico Malvestiti	Jenzer Motorsport	+1.606	17
18	24	(Brazil) Igor Fraga	Charouz Racing System	+1.852	18
19	19	(Austria) Lukas Dunner	MP Motorsport	+2.111	19
20	31	(Germany) Andreas Estner	Campos Racing	+2.117	20
21	20	(Australia) Calan Williams	Jenzer Motorsport	+2.137	21
22	25	(Germany) David Schumacher	Carlin Buzz Racing	+2.305	22
23	26	(France) Clément Novalak	Carlin Buzz Racing	+2.579	23
24	23	(Czech Republic) Roman Staněk	Charouz Racing System	+2.965	24
25	28	(United States) Cameron Das	Carlin Buzz Racing	+3.160	25
26	30	(Italy) Alessio Deledda	Campos Racing	+3.374	26
27	4	(France) Pierre-Louis Chovet	Hitech Grand Prix	+3.588	27
—	6	(Norway) Dennis Hauger	Hitech Grand Prix	No time set	28
—	18	(Netherlands) Bent Viscaal	MP Motorsport	No time set	29
—	25	(Russia) Michael Belov	Charouz Racing System	No time set	30

=== Feature Race ===
Pos.	No.	Driver	Team	Laps	Time/Retired	Grid	Pts.
1	10	(Germany) Lirim Zendeli	Trident	17	38:04.971	1	25 (4)
2	7	(France) Théo Pourchaire	ART Grand Prix	17	+4.047	2	18 (2)
3	11	(Germany) David Beckmann	Trident	17	+5.704	5	15
4	8	(Russia) Aleksandr Smolyar	ART Grand Prix	17	+15.043	3	12
5	1	(Australia) Oscar Piastri	Prema Racing	17	+15.633	8	10
6	2	(Denmark) Frederik Vesti	Prema Racing	17	+19.085	9	8
7	12	(United Kingdom) Olli Caldwell	Trident	17	+22.818	11	6
8	3	(United States) Logan Sargeant	Prema Racing	17	+22.967	4	4
9	5	(New Zealand) Liam Lawson	Hitech Grand Prix	17	+24.571	7	2
10	17	(Netherlands) Richard Verschoor	MP Motorsport	17	+24.894	6	1
11	9	(Venezuela) Sebastián Fernández	ART Grand Prix	17	+25.585	16	
12	16	(Australia) Jack Doohan	HWA Racelab	17	+26.878	13	
13	22	(Italy) Matteo Nannini	Jenzer Motorsport	17	+27.881	14	
14	29	(Australia) Alex Peroni	Campos Racing	17	+30.168	10	
15	6	(Norway) Dennis Hauger	Hitech Grand Prix	17	+30.625	28	
16	20	(Australia) Calan Williams	Jenzer Motorsport	17	+30.853	21	
17	25	(Germany) David Schumacher	Carlin Buzz Racing	17	+33.975	22	
18	21	(Italy) Federico Malvestiti	Jenzer Motorsport	17	+35.054	17	
19	24	(Brazil) Igor Fraga	Charouz Racing System	17	+35.725	18	
20	25	(Russia) Michael Belov	Charouz Racing System	17	+36.455	30	
21	19	(Austria) Lukas Dunner	MP Motorsport	17	+37.018	19	
22	4	(France) Pierre-Louis Chovet	Hitech Grand Prix	17	+39.200	27	
23	18	(Netherlands) Bent Viscaal	MP Motorsport	17	+39.501	29	
24	23	(Czech Republic) Roman Staněk	Charouz Racing System	17	+1:30.840	24	
25	28	(United States) Cameron Das	Carlin Buzz Racing	17	+1:41.379	25	
26	14	(Brazil) Enzo Fittipaldi	HWA Racelab	17	+1:50.868	15	
27	31	(Germany) Andreas Estner	Campos Racing	16	+1 lap	20	
NC	26	(France) Clément Novalak	Carlin Buzz Racing	15	+2 laps	23	
DNF	15	(United Kingdom) Jake Hughes	HWA Racelab	13	Mechanical	12	
DNF	30	(Italy) Alessio Deledda	Campos Racing	3	Accident	26	
Fastest lap set by (United Kingdom) Jake Hughes: 2:07.040 (lap 7)

=== Sprint Race ===
Pos.	No.	Driver	Team	Laps	Time/Retired	Grid	Pts.
1	3	(United States) Logan Sargeant	Prema Racing	17	37:52.233	3	15 (2)
2	2	(Denmark) Frederik Vesti	Prema Racing	17	+0.801	5	12
3	5	(New Zealand) Liam Lawson	Hitech Grand Prix	17	+8.736	2	10
4	8	(Russia) Aleksandr Smolyar	ART Grand Prix	17	+9.480	7	8
5	7	(France) Théo Pourchaire	ART Grand Prix	17	+13.401	9	6
6	1	(Australia) Oscar Piastri	Prema Racing	17	+16.157	6	5
7	17	(Netherlands) Richard Verschoor	MP Motorsport	17	+17.158	1	4
8	10	(Germany) Lirim Zendeli	Trident	17	+23.413	10	3
9	11	(Germany) David Beckmann	Trident	17	+24.882	8	2
10	9	(Venezuela) Sebastián Fernández	ART Grand Prix	17	+25.545	11	1
11	12	(United Kingdom) Olli Caldwell	Trident	17	+27.665	4	
12	14	(Brazil) Enzo Fittipaldi	HWA Racelab	17	+31.429	26	
13	19	(Austria) Lukas Dunner	MP Motorsport	17	+32.455	21	
14	25	(Germany) David Schumacher	Carlin Buzz Racing	17	+37.859	17	
15	26	(France) Clément Novalak	Carlin Buzz Racing	17	+38.940	28	
16	18	(Netherlands) Bent Viscaal	MP Motorsport	17	+41.046	23	
17	15	(United Kingdom) Jake Hughes	HWA Racelab	17	+43.725	29	
18	23	(Czech Republic) Roman Staněk	Charouz Racing System	17	+47.025	24	
19	6	(Norway) Dennis Hauger	Hitech Grand Prix	17	+49.880^{1}	15	
20	31	(Germany) Andreas Estner	Campos Racing	17	+51.647	27	
21	29	(Australia) Alex Peroni	Campos Racing	17	+51.892	14	
22	28	(United States) Cameron Das	Carlin Buzz Racing	17	+56.516	25	
23	30	(Italy) Alessio Deledda	Campos Racing	17	+57.484	30	
24	21	(Italy) Federico Malvestiti	Jenzer Motorsport	17	+1:01.410^{3}	18	
25	20	(Australia) Calan Williams	Jenzer Motorsport	17	+1:16.355	16	
26	22	(Italy) Matteo Nannini	Jenzer Motorsport	17	+1:24.425	13	
27	24	(Brazil) Igor Fraga	Charouz Racing System	16	+1 lap	19	
DNF	25	(Russia) Michael Belov	Charouz Racing System	5	Collision damage^{2}	20	
DNF	4	(France) Pierre-Louis Chovet	Hitech Grand Prix	4	Collision	22	
DNF	16	(Australia) Jack Doohan	HWA Racelab	2	Mechanical	12	
Fastest lap set by (United States) Logan Sargeant: 2:06.865 (lap 3)

Notes：

- ^1 - Dennis Hauger originally finished 18th, but was given a five-second time penalty for causing a collision with Calan Williams.
- ^2 - Michael Belov was given a five-second time penalty for causing a collision with Federico Malvestiti.
- ^3 - Federico Malvestiti was given a ten-second time penalty for causing a collision with Cameron Das.

== Standings after the event ==
Drivers' Championship standings

	Pos.	Driver	Points
	1	(United States) Logan Sargeant	152
	2	(Australia) Oscar Piastri	145
1	3	(Germany) David Beckmann	111.5
1	4	(New Zealand) Liam Lawson	111
	5	(France) Théo Pourchaire	106

Teams' Championship standings

Pos.	Team	Points
1	(Italy) Prema Racing	387.5
2	(Italy) Trident	199.5
3	(France) ART Grand Prix	172
4	(United Kingdom) Hitech Grand Prix	130
5	(Netherlands) MP Motorsport	98

- Note: Only the top five positions are included for both sets of standings.

== See also ==
- 2020 Belgian Grand Prix
- 2020 Spa-Francorchamps Formula 2 round

Previous round: 2020 Barcelona Formula 3 round	FIA Formula 3 Championship; 2020 season	Next round: 2020 Monza Formula 3 round
Previous round: 2019 Spa-Francorchamps Formula 3 round	Spa-Francorchamps Formula 3 round	Next round: 2021 Spa-Francorchamps Formula 3 round
