= 2020 Monza Formula 3 round =

Motor racing event

(Italy) 2020 Autodromo Nazionale di Monza Formula 3 round
Round details
- Round 8 of 9 in the 2020 FIA Formula 3 Championship.
- Layout of the Monza Circuit
- Location: Autodromo Nazionale di Monza; Monza, Italy
- Course: Permanent racing facility 5.793 km (3.600 mi)

Race 1
- Date: 5 September 2020
- Laps: 22
Pole position
Driver	(France) Théo Pourchaire	ART Grand Prix
Time	1:37.301	
Podium
First	(Denmark) Frederik Vesti	Prema Racing
Second	(France) Théo Pourchaire	ART Grand Prix
Third	(Australia) Oscar Piastri	Prema Racing
Fastest lap
Driver	(Denmark) Frederik Vesti	Prema Racing
- Time: 1:39.877 (on lap 6)

Race 2
- Date: 6 September 2020
- Laps: 22
Podium
First	(United Kingdom) Jake Hughes	HWA Racelab
Second	(France) Théo Pourchaire	ART Grand Prix
Third	(Russia) Aleksandr Smolyar	ART Grand Prix
Fastest lap
Driver	(Russia) Aleksandr Smolyar	ART Grand Prix
- Time: 1:40.208 (on lap 17)

The 2020 Monza FIA Formula 3 round is a motor racing event held on 5 and 6 September 2020 at the Autodromo Nazionale di Monza in Monza, Italy. It was the penultimate round of the 2020 FIA Formula 3 Championship, and ran in support of the 2020 Italian Grand Prix.

With Frederik Vesti's win and Oscar Piastri finishing in third in the first race, Prema Racing prematurely secured the teams' championship back-to-back with three races to spare.

== Entries ==
Sophia Flörsch returned to drive for Campos Racing, with Andreas Estner, her replacement in Spa, returning to the Euroformula Open Championship.

== Classification ==
=== Qualifying ===
The Qualifying session took place on 4 September 2020, with Théo Pourchaire setting the fastest laptime of the session. However, him, Smolyar, Chovet, Zendeli, Caldwell, Fernández, Beckmann, Vesti and championship leader Oscar Piastri were all penalized for blocking the track in Qualifying, therefore allowing Liam Lawson, who had initially set the fourth-best laptime, to inherit pole position.

Pos.	No.	Driver	Team	Time/Gap	Grid
1	7	(France) Théo Pourchaire	ART Grand Prix	1:37.301	6^{1}
2	10	(Germany) Lirim Zendeli	Trident	+0.451	12^{1},^{3}
3	8	(Russia) Aleksandr Smolyar	ART Grand Prix	+0.487	11^{1},^{2}
4	5	(New Zealand) Liam Lawson	Hitech Grand Prix	+0.487	1
5	11	(Germany) David Beckmann	Trident	+0.508	10^{1}
6	2	(Denmark) Frederik Vesti	Prema Racing	+0.714	9^{4}
7	22	(Italy) Matteo Nannini	Jenzer Motorsport	+0.735	2
8	15	(United Kingdom) Jake Hughes	HWA Racelab	+0.750	3
9	20	(Australia) Calan Williams	Jenzer Motorsport	+0.763	4
10	3	(United States) Logan Sargeant	Prema Racing	+0.794	5
11	9	(Venezuela) Sebastián Fernández	ART Grand Prix	+0.841	16^{1}
12	1	(Australia) Oscar Piastri	Prema Racing	+0.897	15^{4}
13	24	(Brazil) Igor Fraga	Charouz Racing System	+0.914	7
14	29	(Australia) Alex Peroni	Campos Racing	+0.936	8
15	12	(United Kingdom) Olli Caldwell	Trident	+1.042	20^{1}
16	23	(Czech Republic) Roman Staněk	Charouz Racing System	+1.230	13
17	17	(Netherlands) Richard Verschoor	MP Motorsport	+1.282	14
18	14	(Brazil) Enzo Fittipaldi	HWA Racelab	+1.383	17
19	16	(Australia) Jack Doohan	HWA Racelab	+1.389	18
20	25	(Russia) Michael Belov	Charouz Racing System	+1.422	19
21	18	(Netherlands) Bent Viscaal	MP Motorsport	+1.499	21
22	6	(Norway) Dennis Hauger	Hitech Grand Prix	+1.541	22
23	21	(Italy) Federico Malvestiti	Jenzer Motorsport	+1.564	23
24	26	(France) Clément Novalak	Carlin Buzz Racing	+1.596	24
25	31	(Germany) Sophia Flörsch	Campos Racing	+1.721	25
26	28	(United States) Cameron Das	Carlin Buzz Racing	+1.776	26
27	4	(France) Pierre-Louis Chovet	Hitech Grand Prix	+1.872	30^{1}
28	30	(Italy) Alessio Deledda	Campos Racing	+2.147	27
29	19	(Austria) Lukas Dunner	MP Motorsport	+2.178	28
30	25	(Germany) David Schumacher	Carlin Buzz Racing	+2.193	29

Notes：

- ^1 - Théo Pourchaire, Aleksandr Smolyar, Pierre-Louis Chovet, Lirim Zendeli, Olli Caldwell, Sebastián Fernández and David Beckmann were served five-place grid drops for Race 1 for driving unnecessarily slowly before Turn 11, which forced the following cars to slow down and caused a potentially dangerous situation..
- ^2 - Aleksandr Smolyar was given a further three-place grid drop for driving unnecessary slowly before Turn 2, which forced the entire field to slow down and caused a potentially dangerous situation.
- ^3- Lirim Zendeli was given an additional five-place grid drop for impeding Liam Lawson at Turn 2.
- ^4- Frederik Vesti and Oscar Piastri were given three-place grid drops after it was found that they drove unnecessarily slowly and impeded Jake Hughes.

=== Feature Race ===
Pos.	No.	Driver	Team	Laps	Time/Gap	Grid	Pts.
1	2	(Denmark) Frederik Vesti	Prema Racing	22	38:22.192	9	25 (2)
2	7	(France) Théo Pourchaire	ART Grand Prix	22	+0.899	6	18
3	1	(Australia) Oscar Piastri	Prema Racing	22	+5.470	15	15
4	11	(Germany) David Beckmann	Trident	22	+6.124	10	12
5	15	(United Kingdom) Jake Hughes	HWA Racelab	22	+7.419	3	10
6	5	(New Zealand) Liam Lawson	Hitech Grand Prix	22	+7.984	1	8 (4)
7	10	(Germany) Lirim Zendeli	Trident	22	+8.692	12	6
8	18	(Netherlands) Bent Viscaal	MP Motorsport	22	+9.232	21	4
9	14	(Brazil) Enzo Fittipaldi	HWA Racelab	22	+12.192	17	2
10	25	(Russia) Michael Belov	Charouz Racing System	22	+15.441	19	1
11	23	(Czech Republic) Roman Staněk	Charouz Racing System	22	+15.755	13	
12	6	(Norway) Dennis Hauger	Hitech Grand Prix	22	+17.290	22	
13	26	(France) Clément Novalak	Carlin Buzz Racing	22	+18.455	24	
14	19	(Austria) Lukas Dunner	MP Motorsport	22	+19.185	28	
15	28	(United States) Cameron Das	Carlin Buzz Racing	22	+20.283	26	
16	29	(Australia) Alex Peroni	Campos Racing	22	+21.026	8	
17	16	(Australia) Jack Doohan	HWA Racelab	22	+21.862^{1}	18	
18	4	(France) Pierre-Louis Chovet	Hitech Grand Prix	22	+21.922	30	
19	25	(Germany) David Schumacher	Carlin Buzz Racing	22	+27.277	29	
20	8	(Russia) Aleksandr Smolyar	ART Grand Prix	22	+28.375	11	
21	31	(Germany) Sophia Flörsch	Campos Racing	22	+28.393	25	
22	21	(Italy) Federico Malvestiti	Jenzer Motorsport	22	+29.057	23	
23	30	(Italy) Alessio Deledda	Campos Racing	22	+29.434	27	
24	24	(Brazil) Igor Fraga	Charouz Racing System	22	+34.067	7	
25	20	(Australia) Calan Williams	Jenzer Motorsport	22	+34.500	4	
26	3	(United States) Logan Sargeant	Prema Racing	22	+38.847	5	
27	17	(Netherlands) Richard Verschoor	MP Motorsport	22	+46.678	14	
DNF	9	(Venezuela) Sebastián Fernández	ART Grand Prix	12	Spin	16	
DNF^{2}	22	(Italy) Matteo Nannini	Jenzer Motorsport	8	Mechanical	2	
DNF	12	(United Kingdom) Olli Caldwell	Trident	3	Mechanical	20	
Fastest lap set by (Denmark) Frederik Vesti: 1:39.877 (lap 6)

Notes：

- ^1 - Jack Doohan originally finished twelfth, but was given a five second time penalty after it was found that he overtook Enzo Fittipaldi before the end of a Safety Car period.
- ^2 - Matteo Nannini received a three-place grid penalty for race 2 for causing contact between himself and Liam Lawson.

=== Sprint Race ===
Pos.	No.	Driver	Team	Laps	Time/Gap	Grid	Pts.
1	15	(United Kingdom) Jake Hughes	HWA Racelab	22	37:52.033	6	15
2	7	(France) Théo Pourchaire	ART Grand Prix	22	+4.252	9	12
3	8	(Russia) Aleksandr Smolyar	ART Grand Prix	22	+4.661	20	10 (2)
4	10	(Germany) Lirim Zendeli	Trident	22	+5.400	4	8
5	29	(Australia) Alex Peroni	Campos Racing	22	+8.459	16	6
6	4	(France) Pierre-Louis Chovet	Hitech Grand Prix	22	+8.660	18	5
7	5	(New Zealand) Liam Lawson	Hitech Grand Prix	22	+11.841^{1}	5	4
8	23	(Czech Republic) Roman Staněk	Charouz Racing System	22	+12.123	11	3
9	12	(United Kingdom) Olli Caldwell	Trident	22	+13.783	29	2
10	17	(Netherlands) Richard Verschoor	MP Motorsport	22	+15.117	27	1
11	9	(Venezuela) Sebastián Fernández	ART Grand Prix	22	+16.347	28	
12	31	(Germany) Sophia Flörsch	Campos Racing	22	+23.261	21	
13	25	(Russia) Michael Belov	Charouz Racing System	22	+23.660	1	
14	21	(Italy) Federico Malvestiti	Jenzer Motorsport	22	+24.101	22	
15	6	(Norway) Dennis Hauger	Hitech Grand Prix	22	+25.176	12	
16	28	(United States) Cameron Das	Carlin Buzz Racing	22	+32.409	15	
17	24	(Brazil) Igor Fraga	Charouz Racing System	22	+1:18.518	24	
18	20	(Australia) Calan Williams	Jenzer Motorsport	22	+1:22.626	25	
19	14	(Brazil) Enzo Fittipaldi	HWA Racelab	22	+1:25.853	2	
20	22	(Italy) Matteo Nannini	Jenzer Motorsport	21	+1 lap	30	
21	16	(Australia) Jack Doohan	HWA Racelab	21	+1 lap	17	
22	30	(Italy) Alessio Deledda	Campos Racing	21	+1 lap	23	
23†^{2}	2	(Denmark) Frederik Vesti	Prema Racing	20	Collision damage	10	
24†^{2}	3	(United States) Logan Sargeant	Prema Racing	20	Collision damage	26	
DNF	1	(Australia) Oscar Piastri	Prema Racing	10	Collision damage	8	
DNF	26	(France) Clément Novalak	Carlin Buzz Racing	10	Collision	13	
DNF	25	(Germany) David Schumacher	Carlin Buzz Racing	10	Collision	19	
DNF	11	(Germany) David Beckmann	Trident	8	Mechanical	7	
DNS	19	(Austria) Lukas Dunner	MP Motorsport	0	Mechanical	14	
DSQ^{3}	18	(Netherlands) Bent Viscaal	MP Motorsport	22	Refitted steering wheel	3	
Fastest lap set by (Russia) Aleksandr Smolyar: 1:40.208 (lap 17)

Notes：

- ^1 - Liam Lawson originally finished second, but was given a ten-second time penalty for forcing Lirim Zendeli off the track at turn 1.
- ^2 - Both Frederik Vesti and Logan Sargeant retired from the race after colliding with each other, but were classified as they completed over 90% of the race distance.
- ^3 - Bent Viscaal originally finished eleventh, but was disqualified for a team member reattaching his steering wheel to the car without requesting permission from the Technical Delegate.

== Standings after the event ==
Drivers' Championship standings

	Pos.	Driver	Points
1	1	(Australia) Oscar Piastri	160
1	2	(United States) Logan Sargeant	152
2	3	(France) Théo Pourchaire	136
	4	(New Zealand) Liam Lawson	127
2	5	(Germany) David Beckmann	123.5

Teams' Championship standings

Pos.	Team	Points
1	(Italy) Prema Racing	429.5
2	(Italy) Trident	227.5
3	(France) ART Grand Prix	214
4	(United Kingdom) Hitech Grand Prix	151
5	(Netherlands) MP Motorsport	103

- Note: Only the top five positions are included for both sets of standings.

== See also ==
- 2020 Italian Grand Prix
- 2020 Monza Formula 2 round

== Notes ==
Previous round: 2020 Spa-Francorchamps Formula 3 round	FIA Formula 3 Championship; 2020 season	Next round: 2020 Mugello Formula 3 round
Previous round: 2019 Monza Formula 3 round	Monza Formula 3 round	Next round: 2022 Monza Formula 3 round
