= 2020 Mugello Formula 3 round =

(Italy) 2020 Mugello Formula 3 round
Round details
- Round 9 of 9 in the 2020 FIA Formula 3 Championship.
- Layout of the Mugello Circuit
- Location: Autodromo Internazionale del Mugello; Scarperia e San Piero, Tuscany, Italy
- Course: Permanent racing facility 5.245 km (3.259 mi)

Feature Race
- Date: 12 September 2020
- Laps: 21
Pole position
Driver	(Germany) Lirim Zendeli	Trident
Time	1:35.328	
Podium
First	(Denmark) Frederik Vesti	Prema Racing
Second	(United Kingdom) Jake Hughes	HWA Racelab
Third	(France) Théo Pourchaire	ART Grand Prix
Fastest lap
Driver	(Germany) Lirim Zendeli	Trident
- Time: 1:37.127 (on lap 3)

Sprint Race
- Date: 13 September 2020
- Laps: 21
Podium
First	(New Zealand) Liam Lawson	Hitech Grand Prix
Second	(Germany) David Beckmann	Trident
Third	(France) Théo Pourchaire	ART Grand Prix
Fastest lap
Driver	(Denmark) Frederik Vesti	Prema Racing
- Time: 1:37.879 (on lap 7)

The 2020 Mugello FIA Formula 3 round was a motor racing event held on 12 and 13 September 2020 at the Mugello Circuit in Tuscany, Italy. It was the final round of the 2020 FIA Formula 3 Championship, and ran in support of the 2020 Tuscan Grand Prix. Oscar Piastri would be crowned champion after Logan Sargeant collided with Lirim Zendeli in Race 2, and Theo Pourchaire failed to outscore him.

== Entries ==
With Pierre-Louis Chovet returning to Formula Regional, Hitech Grand Prix tried to sign Igor Fraga to race for them in the final round. However, Fraga's team Charouz Racing System blocked the move, and both teams raced with only two cars that weekend, those of Liam Lawson and Dennis Hauger, and Michael Belov and Roman Staněk respectively.

== Classification ==
=== Qualifying ===
The Qualifying session took place on 11 September 2020, with Lirim Zendeli achieving his second pole position of the year.

Pos.	No.	Driver	Team	Time/Gap	Grid
1	10	(Germany) Lirim Zendeli	Trident	1:35.328	1
2	3	(United States) Logan Sargeant	Prema Racing	+0.034	5^{2}
3	15	(United Kingdom) Jake Hughes	HWA Racelab	+0.125	2
4	2	(Denmark) Frederik Vesti	Prema Racing	+0.220	3
5	14	(Brazil) Enzo Fittipaldi	HWA Racelab	+0.233	4
6	9	(Venezuela) Sebastián Fernández	ART Grand Prix	+0.266	6
7	7	(France) Théo Pourchaire	ART Grand Prix	+0.303	7
8	11	(Germany) David Beckmann	Trident	+0.318	8
9	6	(Norway) Dennis Hauger	Hitech Grand Prix	+0.354	12^{1}
10	8	(Russia) Aleksandr Smolyar	ART Grand Prix	+0.365	9
11	1	(Australia) Oscar Piastri	Prema Racing	+0.371	16^{4}
12	16	(Australia) Jack Doohan	HWA Racelab	+0.613	10
13	5	(New Zealand) Liam Lawson	Hitech Grand Prix	+0.671	11
14	17	(Netherlands) Richard Verschoor	MP Motorsport	+0.715	12
15	29	(Australia) Alex Peroni	Campos Racing	+0.766	13
16	22	(Italy) Matteo Nannini	Jenzer Motorsport	+0.807	15
17	27	(Germany) David Schumacher	Carlin Buzz Racing	+0.838	17
18	12	(United Kingdom) Olli Caldwell	Trident	+0.848	18
19	18	(Netherlands) Bent Viscaal	MP Motorsport	+0.903	19
20	25	(Russia) Michael Belov	Charouz Racing System	+0.991	23^{1}
21	21	(Italy) Federico Malvestiti	Jenzer Motorsport	+1.036	20
22	19	(Austria) Lukas Dunner	MP Motorsport	+1.149	21
23	26	(France) Clément Novalak	Carlin Buzz Racing	+1.209	27^{3}
24	31	(Germany) Sophia Flörsch	Campos Racing	+1.278	22
25	20	(Australia) Calan Williams	Jenzer Motorsport	+1.525	24
26	23	(Czech Republic) Roman Staněk	Charouz Racing System	+1.551	25
27	28	(United States) Cameron Das	Carlin Buzz Racing	+2.243	26
28	30	(Italy) Alessio Deledda	Campos Racing	+2.247	28

Notes：

- ^1 - Dennis Hauger and Michael Belov were handed three-place grid drops each for impeding Clément Novalak and Cameron Das respectively.
- ^2 - Logan Sargeant was handed a three-place grid drop for causing a collision with Frederik Vesti at the previous race.
- ^3 - Clément Novalak was handed a five-place grid drop for causing a collision with Michael Belov and Oscar Piastri at the previous race.
- ^4 - Oscar Piastri was handed a five-place grid drop for forcing David Beckmann off the track at the previous race.

=== Feature Race ===
Pos.	No.	Driver	Team	Laps	Time/Retired	Grid	Pts.
1	2	(Denmark) Frederik Vesti	Prema Racing	21	34:42.873	3	25
2	15	(United Kingdom) Jake Hughes	HWA Racelab	21	+0.324	2	18
3	7	(France) Théo Pourchaire	ART Grand Prix	21	+2.369	7	15
4	10	(Germany) Lirim Zendeli	Trident	21	+4.783	1	12 (4+2)
5	14	(Brazil) Enzo Fittipaldi	HWA Racelab	21	+7.816	4	10
6	3	(United States) Logan Sargeant	Prema Racing	21	+8.511	5	8
7	8	(Russia) Aleksandr Smolyar	ART Grand Prix	21	+10.540	9	6
8	11	(Germany) David Beckmann	Trident	21	+11.019	8	4
9	9	(Venezuela) Sebastián Fernández	ART Grand Prix	21	+11.505	7	2
10	5	(New Zealand) Liam Lawson	Hitech Grand Prix	21	+12.496	11	1
11	1	(Australia) Oscar Piastri	Prema Racing	21	+13.483	16	
12	17	(Netherlands) Richard Verschoor	MP Motorsport	21	+15.308	13	
13	16	(Australia) Jack Doohan	HWA Racelab	21	+19.489	10	
14	6	(Norway) Dennis Hauger	Hitech Grand Prix	21	+25.862	12	
15	27	(Germany) David Schumacher	Carlin Buzz Racing	21	+26.311	17	
16	22	(Italy) Matteo Nannini	Jenzer Motorsport	21	+26.834	15	
17	12	(United Kingdom) Olli Caldwell	Trident	21	+26.900	18	
18	21	(Italy) Federico Malvestiti	Jenzer Motorsport	21	+32.604	20	
19	20	(Australia) Calan Williams	Jenzer Motorsport	21	+33.910	24	
20	29	(Australia) Alex Peroni	Campos Racing	21	+35.469	14	
21	19	(Austria) Lukas Dunner	MP Motorsport	21	+35.509	21	
22	31	(Germany) Sophia Flörsch	Campos Racing	21	+39.588	22	
23	28	(United States) Cameron Das	Carlin Buzz Racing	21	+40.793	26	
24	26	(France) Clément Novalak	Carlin Buzz Racing	21	+48.067	27	
25	30	(Italy) Alessio Deledda	Campos Racing	21	+50.078	28	
26	23	(Czech Republic) Roman Staněk	Charouz Racing System	20	Accident	25	
27	25	(Russia) Michael Belov	Charouz Racing System	20	+1 lap	23	
DNF	18	(Netherlands) Bent Viscaal	MP Motorsport	4	Mechanical	19	
Fastest lap set by (Germany) Lirim Zendeli: 1:37.127 (lap 3)

=== Sprint Race ===
Pos.	No.	Driver	Team	Laps	Time/Retired	Grid	Pts.
1	5	(New Zealand) Liam Lawson	Hitech Grand Prix	21	36:30.379	1	15
2	11	(Germany) David Beckmann	Trident	21	+7.806	3	12
3	7	(France) Théo Pourchaire	ART Grand Prix	21	+9.193	8	10
4	14	(Brazil) Enzo Fittipaldi	HWA Racelab	21	+10.399	6	8
5	17	(Netherlands) Richard Verschoor	MP Motorsport	21	+10.982	12	6
6	15	(United Kingdom) Jake Hughes	HWA Racelab	21	+12.436	9	5
7	1	(Australia) Oscar Piastri	Prema Racing	21	+13.521	9	4
8	9	(Venezuela) Sebastián Fernández	ART Grand Prix	21	+13.564	6	3
9	2	(Denmark) Frederik Vesti	Prema Racing	21	+14.980	10	2 (2)
10	8	(Russia) Aleksandr Smolyar	ART Grand Prix	21	+19.400	4	1
11	16	(Australia) Jack Doohan	HWA Racelab	21	+20.684	13	
12	6	(Norway) Dennis Hauger	Hitech Grand Prix	21	+21.712	14	
13	29	(Australia) Alex Peroni	Campos Racing	21	+22.235	20	
14	26	(France) Clément Novalak	Carlin Buzz Racing	21	+22.785	24	
15	22	(Italy) Matteo Nannini	Jenzer Motorsport	21	+23.256	16	
16	12	(United Kingdom) Olli Caldwell	Trident	21	+23.443	17	
17	19	(Austria) Lukas Dunner	MP Motorsport	21	+26.133	21	
18	23	(Czech Republic) Roman Staněk	Charouz Racing System	21	+29.076	26	
19	27	(Germany) David Schumacher	Carlin Buzz Racing	21	+30.841	15	
20	18	(Netherlands) Bent Viscaal	MP Motorsport	21	+30.930	28	
21	20	(Australia) Calan Williams	Jenzer Motorsport	21	+32.210	19	
22	21	(Italy) Federico Malvestiti	Jenzer Motorsport	21	+34.316	18	
23	25	(Russia) Michael Belov	Charouz Racing System	21	+34.803	27	
24	31	(Germany) Sophia Flörsch	Campos Racing	21	+35.284	22	
25	28	(United States) Cameron Das	Carlin Buzz Racing	21	+37.734	23	
26	30	(Italy) Alessio Deledda	Campos Racing	21	+55.484	25	
DNF	3	(United States) Logan Sargeant	Prema Racing	0	Collision	5	
DNF	10	(Germany) Lirim Zendeli	Trident	0	Collision	7	
Fastest lap set by (Denmark) Frederik Vesti: 1:37.879 (lap 7)

== Final Championship standings ==
Drivers' Championship standings

	Pos.	Driver	Points
	1	(Australia) Oscar Piastri	164
1	2	(France) Théo Pourchaire	161
1	3	(United States) Logan Sargeant	160
2	4	(Denmark) Frederik Vesti	146.5
1	5	(New Zealand) Liam Lawson	143

Teams' Championship standings

	Pos.	Team	Points
	1	(Italy) Prema Racing	470.5
	2	(Italy) Trident	261.5
	3	(France) ART Grand Prix	251
	4	(United Kingdom) Hitech Grand Prix	167
1	5	(Germany) HWA Racelab	138.5

- Note: Only the top five positions are included for both sets of standings.
- Note: Bold names include the Drivers' and Teams' Champion respectively.

== See also ==
- 2020 Tuscan Grand Prix
- 2020 Mugello Formula 2 round

== Notes ==
Previous race: 2020 Monza Formula 3 round	FIA Formula 3 Championship; 2020 season	Next race: 2021 Barcelona Formula 3 round
