= 2020 FIA Formula 3 Championship =

Motor racing championship held in 2020

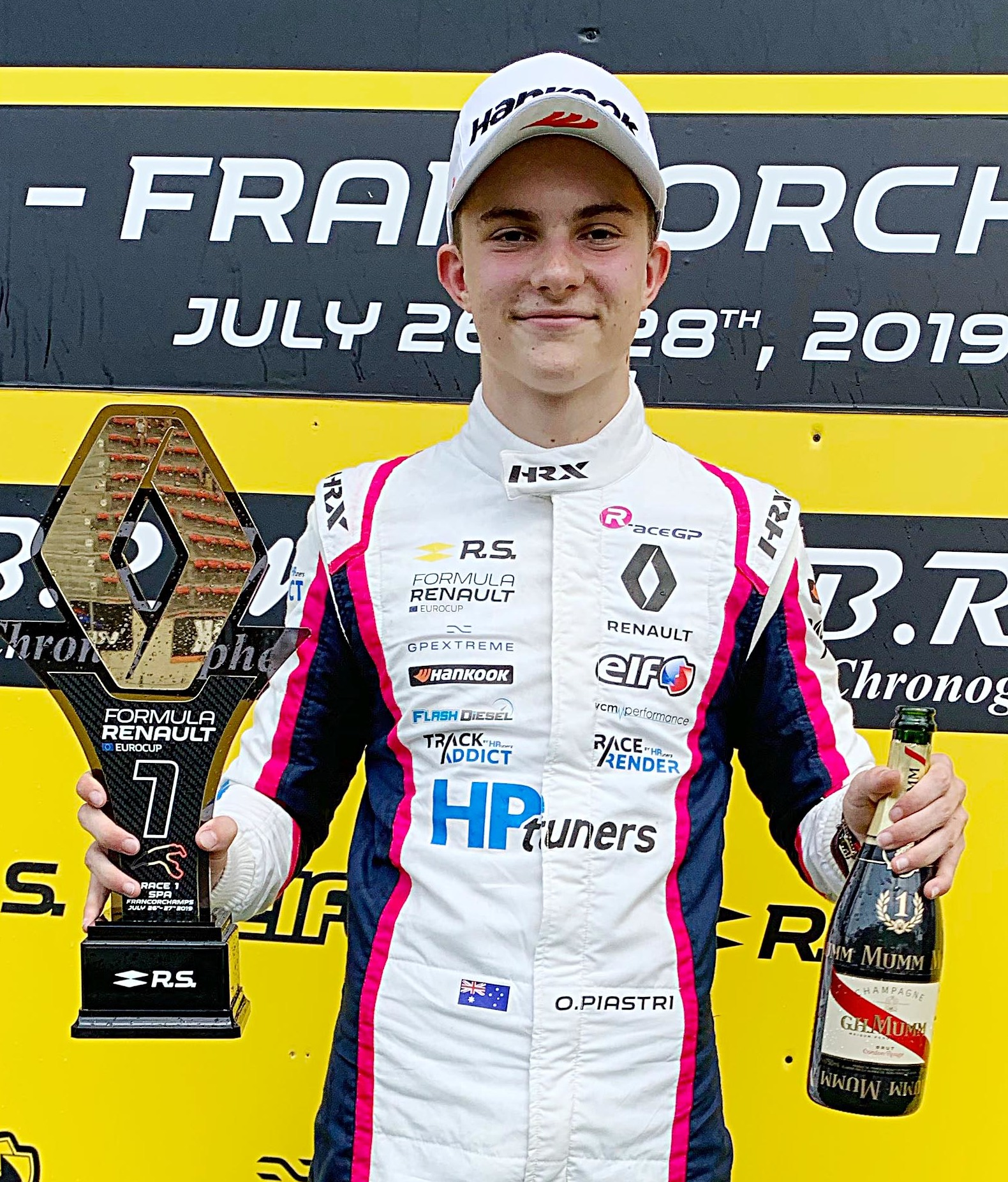
Oscar Piastri became the second FIA Formula 3 Champion.

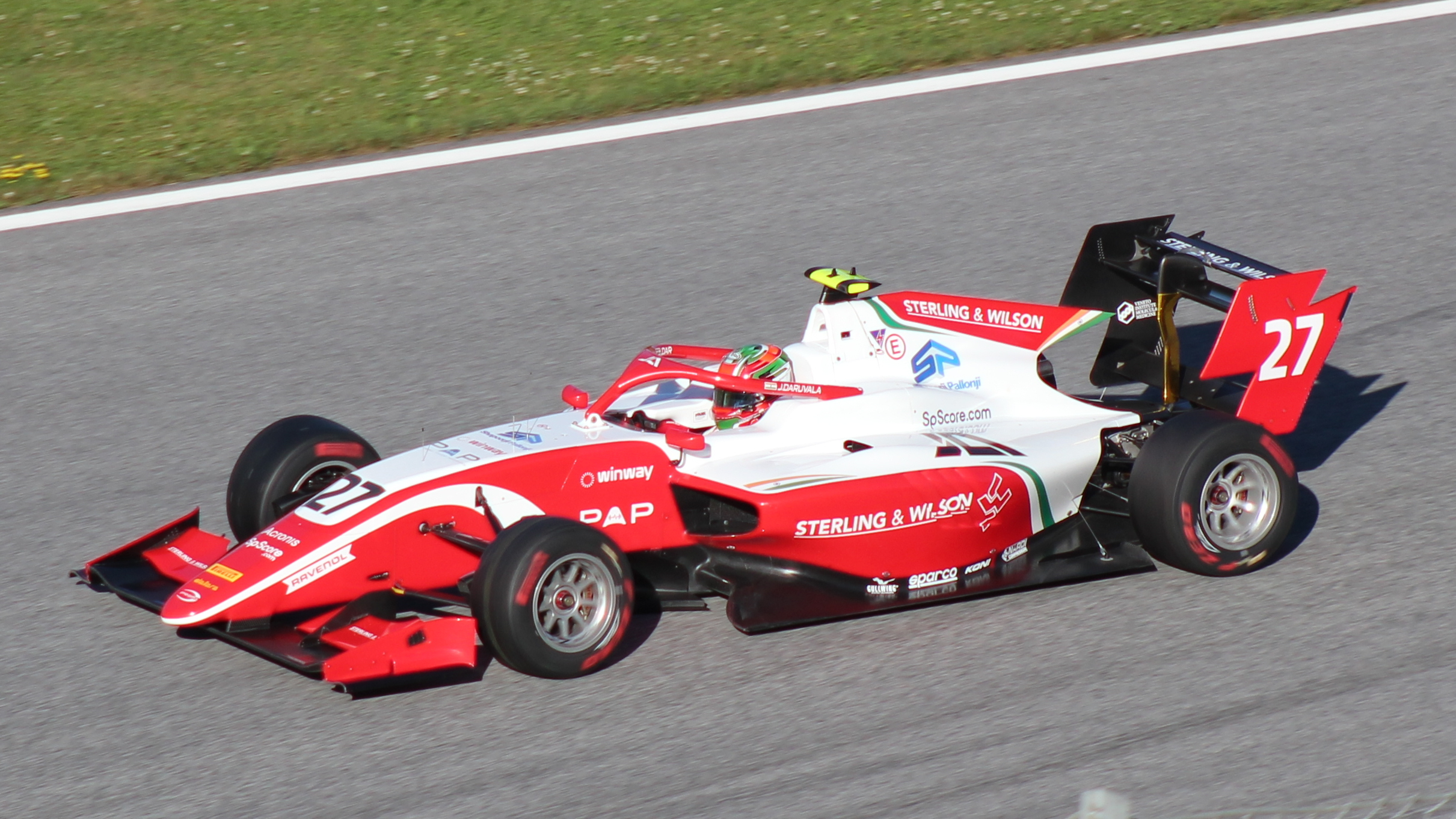
Prema Racing entered the season as the defending Teams' Champions and successfully secured back to back teams titles after the first race at Monza.

The 2020 FIA Formula 3 Championship was the eleventh season of the third-tier of Formula One feeder championship and also second season under the moniker of FIA Formula 3 Championship, a multi-event motor racing championship for single-seat open-wheel formula racing cars. The championship featured drivers competing in 3.4-litre Formula 3 racing cars which conformed to the technical regulations, or formula, of the championship. It ran in support of the Formula 1 World Championship and its sister series, Formula 2, serving as the third tier of formula racing in the FIA Global Pathway.

Oscar Piastri won the title at the Mugello round, which is the final round of the season. (Note: Under the series' sporting regulations, the defending drivers' champion is not permitted to continue racing in the championship.) Prema Racing became the Teams' Champion for the second season in the row having won the title at the Monza round.

== Entries ==
The following teams and drivers were under contract to compete in the 2020 championship. As the championship was a spec series, all teams competed with an identical Dallara F3 2019 chassis and a bespoke tyre compound developed by Pirelli. Each car was powered by a 3.4 L (207 cu in) naturally-aspirated V6 engine developed by Mecachrome.

Entrant	No.	Driver name	Rounds
(Italy) Prema Racing	1	(Australia) Oscar Piastri	All
(Italy) Prema Racing	2	(Denmark) Frederik Vesti	All
(Italy) Prema Racing	3	(United States) Logan Sargeant	All
(United Kingdom) Hitech Grand Prix	4	(United Kingdom) Max Fewtrell	1–6
(United Kingdom) Hitech Grand Prix	4	(France) Pierre-Louis Chovet	7–8
(United Kingdom) Hitech Grand Prix	5	(New Zealand) Liam Lawson	All
(United Kingdom) Hitech Grand Prix	6	(Norway) Dennis Hauger	All
(France) ART Grand Prix	7	(France) Théo Pourchaire	All
(France) ART Grand Prix	8	(Russia) Alexander Smolyar	All
(France) ART Grand Prix	9	(Spain) Sebastián Fernández	All
(Italy) Trident	10	(Germany) Lirim Zendeli	All
(Italy) Trident	11	(Germany) David Beckmann	All
(Italy) Trident	12	(United Kingdom) Olli Caldwell	All
(Germany) HWA Racelab	14	(Brazil) Enzo Fittipaldi	All
(Germany) HWA Racelab	15	(United Kingdom) Jake Hughes	All
(Germany) HWA Racelab	16	(Australia) Jack Doohan	All
(Netherlands) MP Motorsport	17	(Netherlands) Richard Verschoor	All
(Netherlands) MP Motorsport	18	(Netherlands) Bent Viscaal	All
(Netherlands) MP Motorsport	19	(Austria) Lukas Dunner	All
(Switzerland) Jenzer Motorsport	20	(Australia) Calan Williams	All
(Switzerland) Jenzer Motorsport	21	(Italy) Federico Malvestiti	All
(Switzerland) Jenzer Motorsport	22	(Italy) Matteo Nannini	All
(Czech Republic) Charouz Racing System	23	(Czech Republic) Roman Staněk	All
(Czech Republic) Charouz Racing System	24	(Brazil) Igor Fraga	1–8
(Czech Republic) Charouz Racing System	25	(Germany) David Schumacher	1–6
(Czech Republic) Charouz Racing System	25	(Russia) Michael Belov	7–9
(United Kingdom) Carlin Buzz Racing	26	(United Kingdom) Clément Novalak (Note: Clément Novalak is a Franco-Swiss driver competing under a British licence.)	All
(United Kingdom) Carlin Buzz Racing	27	(United Kingdom) Enaam Ahmed	1–3
(United Kingdom) Carlin Buzz Racing	27	(United Kingdom) Ben Barnicoat	4–5
(United Kingdom) Carlin Buzz Racing	27	(Italy) Leonardo Pulcini	6
(United Kingdom) Carlin Buzz Racing	27	(Germany) David Schumacher	7–9
(United Kingdom) Carlin Buzz Racing	28	(United States) Cameron Das	All
(Spain) Campos Racing	29	(Australia) Alex Peroni	All
(Spain) Campos Racing	30	(Italy) Alessio Deledda	All
(Spain) Campos Racing	31	(Germany) Sophia Flörsch	1–6, 8–9
(Spain) Campos Racing	31	(Germany) Andreas Estner	7

=== In detail ===
Marcus Armstrong, Jehan Daruvala and reigning champion Robert Shwartzman all left Prema Racing and the championship to graduate to Formula 2. Logan Sargeant switched from Carlin Buzz Racing to join Prema alongside reigning Formula Regional European and Formula Renault Eurocup champions Frederik Vesti and Renault-backed Oscar Piastri.

Leonardo Pulcini, Jüri Vips and Yifei Ye all left Hitech Grand Prix, with Pulcini and Vips moving to the International GT Open and Super Formula series respectively. Hitech hired Red Bull junior drivers Liam Lawson, who switched from MP Motorsport, and reigning Italian F4 champion Dennis Hauger. They were joined by Renault junior Max Fewtrell, who left ART Grand Prix.

ART Grand Prix fielded an all-new lineup as David Beckmann left for Trident and Christian Lundgaard graduated to the team's Formula 2 outfit. The seats were taken by reigning ADAC Formula 4 champion Théo Pourchaire, Formula Renault Eurocup graduate Aleksandr Smolyar, and Sebastián Fernández, who moved from Campos Racing.

Trident Racing initially retained Devlin DeFrancesco for 2020 but he was replaced with David Beckmann shortly before the championship began. Niko Kari left the team for Charouz Racing System and Pedro Piquet graduated to Formula 2. Their seats were taken by Lirim Zendeli, who joined the team from Charouz, and Formula Regional European graduate Olli Caldwell.

HWA Racelab retained Jake Hughes while Bent Viscaal and Keyvan Andres left the team, with Viscaal switching to MP Motorsport. Formula Regional European runner-up and Ferrari Driver Academy member Enzo Fittipaldi joined the team, as did Asian F3 runner-up and Red Bull junior Jack Doohan.

MP Motorsport retained Richard Verschoor and signed Euroformula Open graduate Lukas Dunner alongside Bent Viscaal. Simo Laaksonen left the team.

Yuki Tsunoda and Andreas Estner left Jenzer Motorsport, with Tsunoda graduating to Formula 2. They were replaced by Euroformula Open driver Calan Williams and reigning Formula 4 UAE champion Matteo Nannini. Federico Malvestiti, who raced for Jenzer at the fourth round of the 2019 season as a replacement driver, joined the team full-time.

Raoul Hyman and Fabio Scherer left Charouz Racing System, with Scherer joining the DTM series. They were replaced by reigning Toyota Racing Series champion Igor Fraga and Formula Regional European graduate David Schumacher. Despite initially hiring Niko Kari for 2020, Charouz Racing System replaced him with Formula 4 graduate Roman Staněk shortly before the season opener.

Felipe Drugovich and Teppei Natori left Carlin Buzz Racing to compete in Formula 2 and Super Formula Lights respectively. Their seats were filled by Euroformula Open graduate Cameron Das and BRDC British Formula 3 champions Enaam Ahmed and Clément Novalak.

Alex Peroni and Alessio Deledda were retained by Campos Racing. Sebastián Fernández was replaced with Formula Regional European graduate Sophia Flörsch.

==== Midseason changes ====
The first mid-season change came for the fourth round at Silverstone, when Enaam Ahmed left Carlin Buzz Racing. He was replaced by McLaren Automotive sportscar driver Ben Barnicoat. Barnicoat was recalled by McLaren before the sixth round in Barcelona and former Hitech Grand Prix driver Leonardo Pulcini stood in for him.

The seventh round at Spa-Francorchamps featured multiple driver changes. David Schumacher departed from Charouz Racing System and announced he would join Carlin for the remainder of the season, thereby replacing Pulcini. Schumacher's seat at Charouz was taken by Formula Renault Eurocup driver Michael Belov. Campos driver Sophia Flörsch missed the round due to commitments in the European Le Mans Series. Former Jenzer driver Andreas Estner deputised in her place. Hitech Grand Prix parted ways with Max Fewtrell and his seat was taken by Formula Regional European driver Pierre-Louis Chovet.

Chovet returned to the Formula Regional European Championship before the season finale at Mugello. Igor Fraga left Charouz to fill Chovet's seat at Hitech, however Charouz refused to authorise the move. Hitech claimed that Charouz had initially agreed to release Fraga before reversing their decision. This left Fraga without a seat at all and both teams competed at Mugello without a third driver.

== Calendar ==
The following nine rounds were scheduled to take place as part of the 2020 championship. The series was to hold its opening round at the Bahrain International Circuit for the first time, and the Circuit Paul Ricard round was to be replaced by a round at Circuit Zandvoort. However, the championship was affected by the COVID-19 pandemic, which saw several rounds postponed. A revised calendar was published in June 2020, which included two events at the Red Bull Ring and two at the Silverstone Circuit.

Round	Circuit	Race 1	Race 2
1	(Austria) Red Bull Ring, Spielberg	4 July	5 July
2	(Austria) Red Bull Ring, Spielberg	11 July	12 July
3	(Hungary) Hungaroring, Mogyoród	18 July	19 July
4	(United Kingdom) Silverstone Circuit, Silverstone	1 August	2 August
5	(United Kingdom) Silverstone Circuit, Silverstone	8 August	9 August
6	(Spain) Circuit de Barcelona-Catalunya, Montmeló	15 August	16 August
7	(Belgium) Circuit de Spa-Francorchamps, Stavelot	29 August	30 August
8	(Italy) Autodromo Nazionale di Monza, Monza	5 September	6 September
9	(Italy) Mugello Circuit, Scarperia e San Piero	12 September	13 September
–	(Russia) Sochi Autodrom, Sochi	Cancelled	Cancelled
–	Bahrain International Circuit, Sakhir	Cancelled	Cancelled
–	(Netherlands) Circuit Zandvoort, Zandvoort	Cancelled (Note: The Zandvoort races were due to take place on 2 and 3 May, but were cancelled due to the COVID-19 pandemic.)	Cancelled

== Regulation changes ==
=== Sporting regulations ===
The championship changed the grid and point systems for the second race of each weekend. The top ten finishers in the first race all scored points and had their places reversed for the grid of the second race.

== Season report ==
At the first round at the Red Bull Ring, ART's Sebastián Fernández took pole position. In race 1, Fernández and Prema's Oscar Piastri collided at the first turn, forcing Fernández into retirement. Piastri went on to win the race on his FIA Formula 3 debut, with Logan Sargeant and Alex Peroni completing the top three. Carlin's Clément Novalak finished 10th and thus started race 2 from pole position. Hitech's Liam Lawson came from fifth on the grid to claim his maiden FIA F3 victory ahead of Richard Verschoor. Novalak took Carlin's first FIA F3 podium with third place. The first round ended with Piastri leading the championship by seven points.

Prema's Frederik Vesti took pole position at the next Red Bull Ring round on the following weekend. The race was affected by heavy rain and was interrupted by safety car periods due to multiple incidents, before eventually being red-flagged on lap 15 of 24. As a result, only half-points were awarded. Vesti took the race victory followed by the Trident pair of Lirim Zendeli and David Beckmann. Near the end of race 2, Liam Lawson and reverse-grid pole-sitter Jake Hughes collided whilst battling for the lead, forcing both into retirement and allowing ART's Théo Pourchaire to claim his first FIA F3 victory. He was followed by Logan Sargeant in second and Beckmann in third. Oscar Piastri maintained his championship lead by 6.5 points.

Qualifying at the Hungaroring was stopped and then postponed due to heavy rain, with ART's Aleksandr Smolyar taking pole position when the session was restarted. Smolyar was eliminated from race 1 after he and Logan Sargeant collided at the first corner. At the same time, a multi-car collision further back eliminated Frederik Vesti and Calan Williams. Théo Pourchaire took the lead of the race, which was soon red-flagged for over 20 minutes when Liam Lawson's car spilt oil on the track. Pourchaire maintained the lead of the race and took his second consecutive victory, with Oscar Piastri in second and Sargeant in third. Sargeant was later penalised for an illegal overtake, promoting Bent Viscaal to the podium. David Beckmann began race 2 from pole position but was soon passed by Dennis Hauger, who led the majority of the race. Viscaal, who started in eighth place, made his way up to the lead but collected two five-second time penalties along the way for causing a collision with Igor Fraga and an illegal overtake on Sargeant. Viscaal had opened up a lead of six seconds before Federico Malvestiti crashed with two laps remaining, bringing out the safety car. The race ended under safety car conditions and Viscaal's penalties demoted him to 17th place. Beckmann was awarded the victory, followed by Piastri in second and Hauger in third. Piastri's championship lead had now extended to 26 points.

Logan Sargeant took his maiden pole for the first round at Silverstone, but could only convert it into a third-place finish in race 1 after being overtaken by Liam Lawson and Oscar Piastri early in the race. The race ended under the safety car after a collision between Olli Caldwell, Lukas Dunner and Max Fewtrell. Lawson broke his series of three non-finishes with the win ahead of Piastri and Sargeant. In race 2, Aleksandr Smolyar led for the entire race distance and claimed victory on the road, but was handed a five-second penalty post-race for illegal defending, demoting him to sixth. As a result, David Beckmann inherited his second sprint race win in succession, with Clément Novalak and Alex Peroni rounding out the podium. Piastri retired from race 2 with a stuck-open DRS, but retained the championship lead by 17 points over Sargeant.

Sargeant again took pole position at the second Silverstone round and converted it into his maiden FIA F3 victory in race 1, followed by Jake Hughes and Liam Lawson. With Oscar Piastri finishing seventh, Sargeant took the lead of the championship by six points. Carlin replacement driver Ben Barnicoat started race 2 on pole position after teammate Clément Novalak received a penalty, but Barnicoat went on to retire with mechanical issues. Lirim Zendeli took the lead at the race start and was closely followed by Bent Viscaal until the final lap. The two drivers fought for position before Viscaal passed Zendeli at the final corner, taking his maiden FIA F3 victory by a margin of 0.189 seconds. Théo Pourchaire completed the podium. Sargeant was eliminated from the race after a collision with Cameron Das, but kept the lead of the championship by one point as title rival Piastri finished sixth.

Sargeant took his third consecutive pole position at the next round at the Circuit de Barcelona-Catalunya, but dropped back to third place in race 1 behind eventual winner Jake Hughes and Liam Lawson. Jenzer driver Matteo Nannini started race 2 from pole position, but fifth-placed Oscar Piastri had the best start and took the lead of the race before the end of the first lap. Piastri maintained his lead to take his second victory of the season, with Alex Peroni in second and Nannini third with his maiden FIA F3 podium finish. Sargeant finished fifth and held on to first place in the championship by one point.

Lirim Zendeli took his first FIA F3 pole position at Spa-Francorchamps and led the entirety of race 1 to claim his maiden victory. He was followed by Théo Pourchaire in second and Trident teammate David Beckmann in third. Title contender Piastri finished fifth, whilst Sargeant suffered engine trouble and eventually finished eighth, allowing Piastri to take the lead of the championship by five points. MP Motorsport's Richard Verschoor started race 2 from pole position, but dropped back to eventually finish seventh. Sargeant took the lead of the race early on and held off teammate Frederik Vesti to take his second victory of the season, with Liam Lawson in third place. Piastri crossed the line fifth but was penalised for an illegal overtake and demoted to sixth. Sargeant reclaimed the championship lead by seven points.

A turbulent qualifying session at Monza ended with Théo Pourchaire fastest, but he and eight other drivers were handed grid penalties for driving unnecessarily slowly, promoting Liam Lawson from fourth to pole position. Pourchaire soon took the lead in race 1 and led until Frederik Vesti, who started ninth, took the lead with two laps to go and claimed his second victory of the season. Pourchaire finished second and Piastri finished third after starting the race in 15th place. This allowed Piastri to reclaim the lead of the championship by eight points; Sargeant failed to score after being pitched into a spin by Clément Novalak and finishing near the back. The teams' championship was decided after race 1 when Prema built an unassailable points lead with three races remaining. In race 2, Lirim Zendeli took the lead at the start from pole-sitter Michael Belov. Zendeli fought for the lead with Enzo Fittipaldi before the two collided, causing Fittipaldi to drop to the back with a puncture. The lead of the race soon passed to Liam Lawson and then Jake Hughes. On lap 10 of 22, fourth-placed Piastri was tapped by Novalak, causing a multi-car accident and forcing both drivers as well as David Schumacher into retirement. No Prema driver would finish the race after Sargeant and Vesti made contact and retired with three laps to go. Hughes won the race followed by Lawson and Pourchaire. A number of drivers were issued penalties post-race, including Lawson for forcing Zendeli off-track, which promoted Aleksandr Smolyar to his first FIA F3 podium. Piastri and Sargeant were both issued with grid penalties for the final round.

Piastri entered the final round at Mugello with an eight-point lead over Sargeant in the standings. Lirim Zendeli took pole position and he, Jake Hughes and Frederik Vesti fought for the lead for the major part of race 1. Vesti came out on top, followed by Hughes with Théo Pourchaire coming from seventh to finish third. Piastri failed to score points after starting 16th and Sargeant finished sixth to leave both drivers tied on 160 points going into the final race, with Pourchaire the only other driver in mathematical contention for the title nine points behind. Liam Lawson started race 2 on pole position, with Sargeant, Pourchaire and Piastri starting fifth, eighth and 11th respectively. Sargeant was forced into retirement on the first lap after a collision with Lirim Zendeli, eliminating him from title contention. Pourchaire made multiple overtakes to eventually finish third behind winner Lawson and David Beckmann, however this was only enough to take second place in the championship as Piastri finished seventh to claim the title.

== Results and standings ==
=== Season summary ===
Round		Circuit	Pole position	Fastest lap	Winning driver	Winning team	Report
1	R1	(Austria) Red Bull Ring	(Spain) Sebastián Fernández	(Australia) Alex Peroni	(Australia) Oscar Piastri	(Italy) Prema Racing	Report
1	R2	(Austria) Red Bull Ring		(Australia) Oscar Piastri	(New Zealand) Liam Lawson	(United Kingdom) Hitech Grand Prix	Report
2	R1	(Austria) Red Bull Ring	(Denmark) Frederik Vesti	(Denmark) Frederik Vesti	(Denmark) Frederik Vesti	(Italy) Prema Racing	Report
2	R2	(Austria) Red Bull Ring		(Australia) Oscar Piastri	(France) Théo Pourchaire	(France) ART Grand Prix	Report
3	R1	(Hungary) Hungaroring	(Russia) Aleksandr Smolyar	(United Kingdom) Jake Hughes (Note: Jake Hughes set the fastest lap, but did not finish in the top 10, so was ineligible to be the point-scorer for the fastest lap. Théo Pourchaire was the point-scorer instead for setting the fastest lap of those finishing in the top 10.)	(France) Théo Pourchaire	(France) ART Grand Prix	Report
3	R2	(Hungary) Hungaroring		(Australia) Oscar Piastri	(Germany) David Beckmann (Note: Bent Viscaal crossed the finished line first, but he had two five-seconds time penalties.)	(Italy) Trident	Report
4	R1	(United Kingdom) Silverstone Circuit	(United States) Logan Sargeant	(United Kingdom) Clément Novalak	(New Zealand) Liam Lawson	(United Kingdom) Hitech Grand Prix	Report
4	R2	(United Kingdom) Silverstone Circuit		(United States) Logan Sargeant	(Germany) David Beckmann (Note: Aleksandr Smolyar crossed the finished line first, but received a five-second time penalty after the race.)	(Italy) Trident	Report
5	R1	(United Kingdom) Silverstone Circuit	(United States) Logan Sargeant	(New Zealand) Liam Lawson	(United States) Logan Sargeant	(Italy) Prema Racing	Report
5	R2	(United Kingdom) Silverstone Circuit		(Netherlands) Bent Viscaal	(Netherlands) Bent Viscaal	(Netherlands) MP Motorsport	Report
6	R1	(Spain) Circuit de Barcelona-Catalunya	(United States) Logan Sargeant	(United Kingdom) Jake Hughes	(United Kingdom) Jake Hughes	(Germany) HWA Racelab	Report
6	R2	(Spain) Circuit de Barcelona-Catalunya		(Norway) Dennis Hauger (Note: Dennis Hauger set the fastest lap, but did not finish in the top 10, so was ineligible to be the point-scorer for the fastest lap. Oscar Piastri was the point-scorer instead for setting the fastest lap of those finishing in the top 10.)	(Australia) Oscar Piastri	(Italy) Prema Racing	Report
7	R1	(Belgium) Circuit de Spa-Francorchamps	(Germany) Lirim Zendeli	(United Kingdom) Jake Hughes (Note: Jake Hughes set the fastest lap, but did not finish in the top 10, so was ineligible to be the point-scorer for the fastest lap. Théo Pourchaire was the point-scorer instead for setting the fastest lap of those finishing in the top 10.)	(Germany) Lirim Zendeli	(Italy) Trident	Report
7	R2	(Belgium) Circuit de Spa-Francorchamps		(United States) Logan Sargeant	(United States) Logan Sargeant	(Italy) Prema Racing	Report
8	R1	(Italy) Autodromo Nazionale di Monza	(New Zealand) Liam Lawson (Note: Théo Pourchaire originally claimed pole position, however, he received a 5-place grid penalty for driving unnecessarily slowly.)	(Australia) Alex Peroni (Note: Alex Peroni set the fastest lap, but did not finish in the top 10, so was ineligible to be the point-scorer for the fastest lap. Frederik Vesti was the point-scorer instead for setting the fastest lap of those finishing in the top 10.)	(Denmark) Frederik Vesti	(Italy) Prema Racing	Report
8	R2	(Italy) Autodromo Nazionale di Monza		(United Kingdom) Clément Novalak (Note: Clément Novalak set the fastest lap, but did not finish in the top 10, so was ineligible to be the point-scorer for the fastest lap. Aleksandr Smolyar was the point-scorer instead for setting the fastest lap of those finishing in the top 10.)	(United Kingdom) Jake Hughes	(Germany) HWA Racelab	Report
9	R1	(Italy) Mugello Circuit	(Germany) Lirim Zendeli	(Germany) Lirim Zendeli	(Denmark) Frederik Vesti	(Italy) Prema Racing	Report
9	R2	(Italy) Mugello Circuit		(Denmark) Frederik Vesti	(New Zealand) Liam Lawson	(United Kingdom) Hitech Grand Prix	Report

=== Scoring system ===
Points were awarded to the top ten classified finishers in both races, but with fewer points available during race 2. The pole-sitter in race 1 also received four points, and two points were given to the driver who set the fastest lap inside the top ten in both races. No extra points were awarded to the pole-sitter in race 2 as the grid for race 2 was based on the results of race 1, with the top ten drivers having their positions reversed.

Race 1 points

Position	**1st**	**2nd**	**3rd**	**4th**	**5th**	**6th**	**7th**	**8th**	**9th**	**10th**	**Pole**	**FL**
Points	25	18	15	12	10	8	6	4	2	1	4	2

Race 2 points

Position	**1st**	**2nd**	**3rd**	**4th**	**5th**	**6th**	**7th**	**8th**	**9th**	**10th**	**FL**
Points	15	12	10	8	6	5	4	3	2	1	2

=== Drivers' championship ===
Pos.	Driver	RBR1 (Austria)		RBR2^{‡} (Austria)		HUN (Hungary)		SIL1 (United Kingdom)		SIL2 (United Kingdom)		CAT (Spain)		SPA (Belgium)		MNZ (Italy)		MUG (Italy)		Points
Pos.	Driver	R1	R2	R1	R2	R1	R2	R1	R2	R1	R2	R1	R2	R1	R2	R1	R2	R1	R2	Points
1	(Australia) Oscar Piastri	1	8	4	5	2	2	2	Ret	7	6	6	1	5	6	3	Ret	11	7	164
2	(France) Théo Pourchaire	13	26	9	1	1	6	12	8	6	3	7	6	2	5	2	2	3	3	161
3	(United States) Logan Sargeant	2	27	6	2	6	4	**3**	5	**1**	Ret	**3**	5	8	1	26	24†	6	Ret	160
4	(Denmark) Frederik Vesti	4	6	**1**	8	Ret	Ret	5	4	4	8	Ret	21	6	2	1	23†	1	9	146.5
5	(New Zealand) Liam Lawson	6	1	8	Ret	Ret	Ret	1	7	3	5	2	7	9	3	**6**	7	10	1	143
6	(Germany) David Beckmann	7	4	3	3	10	1	9	1	5	4	5	9	3	9	4	Ret	8	2	139.5
7	(United Kingdom) Jake Hughes	28	12	10	Ret	24	19	4	10	2	7	1	10	Ret	17	5	1	2	6	111.5
8	(Germany) Lirim Zendeli	5	5	2	10	Ret	16	13	11	9	2	12	16	**1**	8	7	4	**4**	Ret	104
9	(Netherlands) Richard Verschoor	8	2	7	4	4	5	11	9	19	18	9	4	10	7	27	10	12	5	69
10	(Australia) Alex Peroni	3	Ret	11	11	7	10	6	3	14	24	8	2	14	21	16	5	20	13	64
11	(Russia) Alexander Smolyar	9	7	Ret	20	**Ret**	7	10	6	13	14	11	12	4	4	20	3	7	10	59
12	(United Kingdom) Clément Novalak	10	3	29	25	9	12	8	2	12	9	4	11	NC	15	13	Ret	24	14	45
13	(Netherlands) Bent Viscaal	11	11	20	16	3	17	Ret	16	8	1	Ret	20	23	16	8	DSQ	Ret	20	40
14	(Spain) Sebastián Fernández	**Ret**	13	13	9	5	8	7	21	24	13	15	13	11	10	Ret	11	9	8	31
15	(Brazil) Enzo Fittipaldi	18	9	15	13	19	9	18	19	17	17	13	8	26	12	9	19	5	4	27
16	(United Kingdom) Olli Caldwell	20	19	5	6	21	18	Ret	26	21	22	20	Ret	7	11	Ret	9	17	16	18
17	(Norway) Dennis Hauger	15	22	18	12	8	3	16	17	Ret	20	18	26	15	19	12	15	14	12	14
18	(Italy) Matteo Nannini	27	18	23	NC	22	24†	24	23	27†	16	10	3	13	26	Ret	20	16	15	11
19	(France) Pierre-Louis Chovet													22	Ret	18	6			5
20	(United Kingdom) Max Fewtrell	12	10	14	7	11	11	Ret	20	16	12	17	Ret							5
21	(Czech Republic) Roman Staněk	17	23	17	24	23	20	17	18	22	15	22	19	24	18	11	8	26†	18	3
22	(United Kingdom) Ben Barnicoat							20	12	10	Ret									1
23	(Russia) Michael Belov													20	Ret	10	13	27	23	1
24	(Brazil) Igor Fraga	16	25	26	14	15	Ret	15	Ret	18	10	24	18	19	27	24	17			1
25	(United States) Cameron Das	22	Ret	24	Ret	17	22	21	24	11	11	19	17	25	22	15	16	23	25	0
26	(Australia) Jack Doohan	14	Ret	22	19	Ret	25	Ret	27	26	21	14	15	12	Ret	17	21	13	11	0
27	(Austria) Lukas Dunner	24	14	16	18	12	Ret	Ret	22	23	Ret	21	22	21	13	14	Ret	21	17	0
28	(Germany) David Schumacher	25	15	12	17	16	13	25	15	15	Ret	23	25	17	14	19	Ret	15	19	0
29	(Germany) Sophia Flörsch	26	16	21	Ret	18	14	22	25	20	19	27	23			21	12	22	24	0
30	(Italy) Federico Malvestiti	19	21	28	22	13	Ret	19	13	Ret	23	26	Ret	18	24	22	14	18	22	0
31	(Australia) Calan Williams	21	17	25	23	Ret	15	14	14	Ret	Ret	25	14	16	25	25	18	19	21	0
32	(United Kingdom) Enaam Ahmed	23	24	19	15	14	21													0
33	(Italy) Leonardo Pulcini											16	24							0
34	(Italy) Alessio Deledda	29	20	27	21	20	23	23	28	25	Ret	28	Ret	Ret	23	23	22	25	26	0
35	(Germany) Andreas Estner													27	20					0
Pos.	Driver	R1	R2	R1	R2	R1	R2	R1	R2	R1	R2	R1	R2	R1	R2	R1	R2	R1	R2	Points
Pos.	Driver	RBR1 (Austria)		RBR2 (Austria)		HUN (Hungary)		SIL1 (United Kingdom)		SIL2 (United Kingdom)		CAT (Spain)		SPA (Belgium)		MNZ (Italy)		MUG (Italy)		Points

Key
Colour	Result
Gold	Winner
Silver	2nd place
Bronze	3rd place
Green	Other points position
Blue	Other classified position
Blue	Not classified, finished (NC)
Purple	Not classified, retired (Ret)
Red	Did not qualify (DNQ)
Red	Did not pre-qualify (DNPQ)
Black	Disqualified (DSQ)
White	Did not start (DNS)
White	Race cancelled (C)
Blank	Did not practice (DNP)
Blank	Excluded (EX)
Blank	Did not arrive (DNA)
Blank	Withdrawn (WD)
Text formatting	Meaning
**Bold**	Pole position point(s)
Italics	Fastest lap point(s)

Notes:

- † – Drivers did not finish the race, but were classified, as they completed more than 90% of the race distance.
- ‡ – Half points were awarded for race 1, as less than 75% of the scheduled distance was completed.

=== Teams' championship ===
Pos.	Team	No.	RBR1 (Austria)		RBR2^{‡} (Austria)		HUN (Hungary)		SIL1 (United Kingdom)		SIL2 (United Kingdom)		CAT (Spain)		SPA (Belgium)		MNZ (Italy)		MUG (Italy)		Points
Pos.	Team	No.	R1	R2	R1	R2	R1	R2	R1	R2	R1	R2	R1	R2	R1	R2	R1	R2	R1	R2	Points
1	(Italy) Prema Racing	1	1	8	4	5	2	2	2	Ret	7	6	6	1	5	6	3	Ret	11	7	470.5
1	(Italy) Prema Racing	2	4	6	**1**	8	Ret	Ret	5	4	4	8	Ret	21	6	2	1	23†	1	9	470.5
1	(Italy) Prema Racing	3	2	27	6	2	6	4	**3**	5	**1**	Ret	**3**	5	8	1	26	24†	6	Ret	470.5
2	(Italy) Trident	10	5	5	2	10	Ret	16	13	11	9	2	12	16	**1**	8	7	4	**4**	Ret	261.5
2	(Italy) Trident	11	7	4	3	3	10	1	9	1	5	4	5	9	3	9	4	Ret	8	2	261.5
2	(Italy) Trident	12	20	19	5	6	21	18	Ret	26	21	22	20	Ret	7	11	Ret	9	17	16	261.5
3	(France) ART Grand Prix	7	13	26	9	1	1	6	12	8	6	3	7	6	2	5	2	2	3	3	251
3	(France) ART Grand Prix	8	9	7	Ret	20	**Ret**	7	10	6	13	14	11	12	4	4	20	3	7	10	251
3	(France) ART Grand Prix	9	**Ret**	13	13	9	5	8	7	21	24	13	15	13	11	10	Ret	11	9	8	251
4	(United Kingdom) Hitech Grand Prix	4	12	10	14	7	11	11	Ret	20	16	12	17	Ret	22	Ret	18	6			167
4	(United Kingdom) Hitech Grand Prix	5	6	1	8	Ret	Ret	Ret	1	7	3	5	2	7	9	3	**6**	7	10	1	167
4	(United Kingdom) Hitech Grand Prix	6	15	22	18	12	8	3	16	17	Ret	20	18	26	15	19	12	15	14	12	167
5	(Germany) HWA Racelab	14	18	9	15	13	19	9	18	19	17	17	13	8	26	12	9	19	5	4	138.5
5	(Germany) HWA Racelab	15	28	12	10	Ret	24	19	4	10	2	7	1	10	Ret	17	5	1	2	6	138.5
5	(Germany) HWA Racelab	16	14	Ret	22	19	Ret	25	Ret	27	26	21	14	15	12	Ret	17	21	13	11	138.5
6	(Netherlands) MP Motorsport	17	8	2	7	4	4	5	11	9	19	18	9	4	10	7	27	10	12	5	109
6	(Netherlands) MP Motorsport	18	11	11	20	16	3	17	Ret	16	8	1	Ret	20	23	16	8	DSQ	Ret	20	109
6	(Netherlands) MP Motorsport	19	24	14	16	18	12	Ret	Ret	22	23	Ret	21	22	21	13	14	Ret	21	17	109
7	(Spain) Campos Racing	29	3	Ret	11	11	7	10	6	3	14	24	8	2	14	21	16	5	20	13	64
7	(Spain) Campos Racing	30	29	20	27	21	20	23	23	28	25	Ret	28	Ret	Ret	23	23	22	25	26	64
7	(Spain) Campos Racing	31	26	16	21	Ret	18	14	22	25	20	19	27	23	27	20	21	12	22	24	64
8	(United Kingdom) Carlin Buzz Racing	26	10	3	29	25	9	12	8	2	12	9	4	11	NC	15	13	Ret	24	14	46
8	(United Kingdom) Carlin Buzz Racing	27	23	24	19	15	14	21	20	12	10	Ret	16	24	17	14	19	Ret	15	19	46
8	(United Kingdom) Carlin Buzz Racing	28	22	Ret	24	Ret	17	22	21	24	11	11	19	17	25	22	15	16	23	25	46
9	(Switzerland) Jenzer Motorsport	20	21	17	25	23	Ret	15	14	14	Ret	Ret	25	14	16	25	25	18	19	21	11
9	(Switzerland) Jenzer Motorsport	21	19	21	28	22	13	Ret	19	13	Ret	23	26	Ret	18	24	22	14	18	22	11
9	(Switzerland) Jenzer Motorsport	22	27	18	23	NC	22	24†	24	23	27†	16	10	3	13	26	Ret	20	16	15	11
10	(Czech Republic) Charouz Racing System	23	17	23	17	24	23	20	17	18	22	15	22	19	24	18	11	8	26†	18	5
10	(Czech Republic) Charouz Racing System	24	16	25	26	14	15	Ret	15	Ret	18	10	24	18	19	27	24	17			5
10	(Czech Republic) Charouz Racing System	25	25	15	12	17	16	13	25	15	15	Ret	23	25	20	Ret	10	13	27	23	5
Pos.	Team	No.	R1	R2	R1	R2	R1	R2	R1	R2	R1	R2	R1	R2	R1	R2	R1	R2	R1	R2	Points
Pos.	Team	No.	RBR1 (Austria)		RBR2 (Austria)		HUN (Hungary)		SIL1 (United Kingdom)		SIL2 (United Kingdom)		CAT (Spain)		SPA (Belgium)		MNZ (Italy)		MUG (Italy)		Points

Key
Colour	Result
Gold	Winner
Silver	2nd place
Bronze	3rd place
Green	Other points position
Blue	Other classified position
Blue	Not classified, finished (NC)
Purple	Not classified, retired (Ret)
Red	Did not qualify (DNQ)
Red	Did not pre-qualify (DNPQ)
Black	Disqualified (DSQ)
White	Did not start (DNS)
White	Race cancelled (C)
Blank	Did not practice (DNP)
Blank	Excluded (EX)
Blank	Did not arrive (DNA)
Blank	Withdrawn (WD)
Text formatting	Meaning
**Bold**	Pole position point(s)
Italics	Fastest lap point(s)

Notes:

- † – Drivers did not finish the race, but were classified as they completed more than 90% of the race distance.
- ‡ – Half points were awarded for race 1, as less than 75% of the scheduled distance was completed.
