= 2016 Formula 4 United States Championship =

Motor racing competition

The 2016 Formula 4 United States Championship season was the inaugural season of the United States Formula 4 Championship, a motor racing series regulated according to FIA Formula 4 regulations and sanctioned by SCCA Pro Racing, the professional racing division of the Sports Car Club of America. It began on 2 July at the Mid-Ohio Sports Car Course and finished on 10 October at the Homestead-Miami Speedway, after five triple header rounds.

== Teams and drivers ==
All teams were American-registered.

| Team | No. | Driver | Rounds |
|---|---|---|---|
| Momentum Motorsport | 1 | (Argentina) Baltazar Leguizamón | 1–3 |
| Momentum Motorsport | 1 | (Jamaica) Brian Fowler | 5 |
| Momentum Motorsport | 2 | (United States) Skylar Robinson | 2–3, 5 |
| Momentum Motorsport | 3 | (United States) Quinlan Lall | 3 |
| GMV Motorsports (Note: Team entered as GMV for rounds 1-4 and as MVM for round 5.); MVM Motorsports | 4 | (Canada) Michael Goodyear | 1–2, 4 |
| GMV Motorsports; MVM Motorsports | 4 | (United States) Skylar Robinson | 4 |
| GMV Motorsports; MVM Motorsports | 34 | (United States) Austin Kaszuba | All |
| GMV Motorsports; MVM Motorsports | 45 | (Argentina) Baltazar Leguizamón | 4–5 |
| GMV Motorsports; MVM Motorsports | 51 | (United States) Alan Miller | 5 |
| Primus Racing | 5 | (United States) Kyle Kirkwood | All |
| Primus Racing | 10 | (United States) Davis Durrett | 1–2 |
| Primus Racing | 11 | (United States) James Goughary Jr. | All |
| JDX Racing | 7 | (United States) Blake Mount | All |
| JDX Racing | 25 | (United States) Darren Keane | All |
| JDX Racing | 28 | (United States) Cameron Das | All |
| DRG | 10 | (United States) Davis Durrett | 3–5 |
| Leading Edge Grand Prix (Note: Team entered as Leading Edge GP for rounds 1-4 and as Global Racing Group for round 5.); Global Racing Group | 12 | (Mexico) Moisés de la Vara | All |
| Leading Edge Grand Prix; Global Racing Group | 24 | (Denmark) Benjamin Pedersen | All |
| Leading Edge Grand Prix; Global Racing Group | 47 | (United States) Konrad Czaczyk | All |
| Group-A Racing | 62 | (Canada) Raphael Forcier | All |
| Group-A Racing | 86 | (China) Jackie Ding | 2–5 |
| Bamford Motorsports | 77 | (Canada) Steve Bamford | 1–4 |

== Race calendar ==
The calendar was unveiled on 12 November 2015. On 4 May 2016, it was announced the first round at Lime Rock Park, to be held on 27–28 May, would be rescheduled to give drivers and teams more time to prepare themselves for the season. On 25 May it was announced the first round at the New Jersey Motorsports Park would be rescheduled, while the opening round was replaced by a second round at the Mid-Ohio Sports Car Course. All rounds were held on circuits on the East Coast of the United States. One round was part of the NASCAR Xfinity Series weekend.

| Round | | Circuit | Location | Date | Pole position | Fastest lap | Winning driver | Winning team | Supporting |
|---|---|---|---|---|---|---|---|---|---|
| 1 | R1 | Mid-Ohio Sports Car Course | Lexington, Ohio | 2 July | (United States) Kyle Kirkwood | (United States) Darren Keane | (United States) Konrad Czaczyk | Leading Edge GP | Atlantic Championship; F2000 Championship Series; F1600 Championship Series |
| 1 | R2 | Mid-Ohio Sports Car Course | Lexington, Ohio | 3 July | | (United States) Konrad Czaczyk | (United States) Konrad Czaczyk | Leading Edge GP | Atlantic Championship; F2000 Championship Series; F1600 Championship Series |
| 1 | R3 | Mid-Ohio Sports Car Course | Lexington, Ohio | 3 July | | (United States) Kyle Kirkwood | (United States) Konrad Czaczyk | Leading Edge GP | Atlantic Championship; F2000 Championship Series; F1600 Championship Series |
| 2 | R1 | Mid-Ohio Sports Car Course | Lexington, Ohio | 12 August | (United States) Cameron Das | (United States) Konrad Czaczyk | (United States) Kyle Kirkwood | Primus Racing | NASCAR Xfinity Series; Trans-Am Series |
| 2 | R2 | Mid-Ohio Sports Car Course | Lexington, Ohio | 12 August | | (United States) Cameron Das | (United States) Skylar Robinson | Momentum Motorsport | NASCAR Xfinity Series; Trans-Am Series |
| 2 | R3 | Mid-Ohio Sports Car Course | Lexington, Ohio | 13 August | | (United States) Cameron Das | (United States) Cameron Das | JDX Racing | NASCAR Xfinity Series; Trans-Am Series |
| 3 | R1 | New Jersey Motorsports Park | Millville, New Jersey | 27 August | (United States) Cameron Das | (United States) Cameron Das | (United States) James Goughary Jr. | Primus Racing | Atlantic Championship; F2000 Championship Series; F1600 Championship Series |
| 3 | R2 | New Jersey Motorsports Park | Millville, New Jersey | 28 August | | (United States) Cameron Das | (United States) Cameron Das | JDX Racing | Atlantic Championship; F2000 Championship Series; F1600 Championship Series |
| 3 | R3 | New Jersey Motorsports Park | Millville, New Jersey | 28 August | | (United States) Quinlan Lall | (United States) Cameron Das | JDX Racing | Atlantic Championship; F2000 Championship Series; F1600 Championship Series |
| 4 | R1 | Road Atlanta | Braselton, Georgia | 17 September | (United States) Cameron Das | (United States) Cameron Das | (United States) Cameron Das | JDX Racing | Historic Sportscar Racing Series |
| 4 | R2 | Road Atlanta | Braselton, Georgia | 17 September | | (United States) Cameron Das | (United States) Cameron Das | JDX Racing | Historic Sportscar Racing Series |
| 4 | R3 | Road Atlanta | Braselton, Georgia | 18 September | | (United States) Skylar Robinson | (United States) Cameron Das | JDX Racing | Historic Sportscar Racing Series |
| 5 | R1 | Homestead-Miami Speedway | Homestead, Florida | 9 October | (United States) Cameron Das | (United States) Cameron Das | (United States) Cameron Das | JDX Racing | Trans-Am Series |
| 5 | R2 | Homestead-Miami Speedway | Homestead, Florida | 10 October | | (United States) Cameron Das | (United States) Cameron Das | JDX Racing | Trans-Am Series |
| 5 | R3 | Homestead-Miami Speedway | Homestead, Florida | 10 October | | (United States) Cameron Das | (United States) Cameron Das | JDX Racing | Trans-Am Series |

== Championship standings ==
Points were awarded to the top 10 classified finishers in each race.

| Position | **1st** | **2nd** | **3rd** | **4th** | **5th** | **6th** | **7th** | **8th** | **9th** | **10th** |
| Points | 25 | 18 | 15 | 12 | 10 | 8 | 6 | 4 | 2 | 1 |

=== Drivers' standings ===
| Pos | Driver | MOH1 | | | MOH2 | | | NJMP | | | ATL | | | HMS | | | Points |
|---|---|---|---|---|---|---|---|---|---|---|---|---|---|---|---|---|---|
| 1 | (United States) Cameron Das | 5 | 4 | 4 | **12** | 4 | 1 | **5** | 1 | 1 | **1** | 1 | 1 | **1** | 1 | 1 | 281 |
| 2 | (United States) Konrad Czaczyk | 1 | 1 | 1 | 10 | DNS | 10 | 4 | 2 | 2 | 3 | 2 | 2 | 2 | 2 | 4 | 224 |
| 3 | (United States) Kyle Kirkwood | **2** | 2 | 2 | 1 | Ret | 2 | 2 | 11 | Ret | 2 | 3 | 3 | 5 | 9 | 6 | 183 |
| 4 | (United States) James Goughary, Jr. | 7 | 10 | 6 | 3 | 6 | 9 | 1 | 6 | 4 | 7 | 8 | 7 | 3 | 5 | 5 | 141 |
| 5 | (United States) Skylar Robinson | | | | 2 | 1 | 12 | 15 | 3 | 3 | DSQ | 4 | 6 | 4 | 4 | 3 | 132 |
| 6 | (Argentina) Baltazar Leguizamón | 8 | Ret | 7 | Ret | 12 | DNS | 11 | 10 | 12 | 5 | 5 | Ret | 6 | 3 | 2 | 72 |
| 7 | (Mexico) Moisés de la Vara | 13 | 6 | 10 | Ret | 5 | 3 | 6 | 9 | 6 | Ret | 13 | 5 | 10 | 6 | 12 | 71 |
| 8 | (United States) Austin Kaszuba | 9 | 7 | Ret | Ret | 3 | 5 | 7 | 13 | 11 | 4 | Ret | 4 | 15 | 12 | 7 | 69 |
| 9 | (Canada) Raphael Forcier | 6 | 5 | 3 | Ret | 13 | Ret | 3 | 14 | 7 | Ret | 14 | 11 | Ret | 7 | 10 | 61 |
| 10 | (Denmark) Benjamin Pedersen | 3 | 9 | 5 | Ret | Ret | Ret | 9 | 4 | 10 | 11 | 6 | 10 | 7 | Ret | Ret | 57 |
| 11 | (United States) Darren Keane | 10 | 3 | Ret | 6 | 7 | 8 | 8 | Ret | Ret | 6 | 10 | Ret | 8 | Ret | 14 | 53 |
| 12 | (China) Jackie Ding | | | | 4 | 2 | Ret | Ret | 5 | 5 | Ret | 11 | 9 | 9 | Ret | Ret | 50 |
| 13 | (United States) Davis Durrett | Ret | 11 | 9 | 5 | 9 | 7 | 10 | 7 | 8 | 10 | 12 | 8 | 13 | 11 | 9 | 40 |
| 14 | (Canada) Michael Goodyear | 4 | 13 | 11 | 7 | 11 | 4 | | | | WD | WD | WD | | | | 30 |
| 15 | (United States) Blake Mount | Ret | 12 | 8 | 9 | 10 | 6 | 14 | Ret | 14 | 8 | 9 | Ret | 11 | 8 | 8 | 29 |
| 16 | (Canada) Steve Bamford | 11 | 8 | Ret | 8 | 8 | 11 | 13 | 12 | 13 | 9 | 7 | 12 | | | | 20 |
| 17 | (United States) Quinlan Lall | | | | | | | 12 | 8 | 9 | | | | | | | 6 |
| 18 | (United States) Alan Miller | | | | | | | | | | | | | 12 | 10 | 11 | 1 |
| 19 | (Jamaica) Brian Fowler | | | | | | | | | | | | | 14 | 13 | 13 | 0 |
| Pos | Driver | MOH1 | | | MOH2 | | | NJMP | | | ATL | | | HMS | | | Points |

| Colour | Result |
|---|---|
| Gold | Winner |
| Silver | Second place |
| Bronze | Third place |
| Green | Points classification |
| Blue | Non-points classification |
| Blue | Non-classified finish (NC) |
| Purple | Retired, not classified (Ret) |
| Red | Did not qualify (DNQ) |
| Red | Did not pre-qualify (DNPQ) |
| Black | Disqualified (DSQ) |
| White | Did not start (DNS) |
| White | Withdrew (WD) |
| White | Race cancelled (C) |
| Blank | Did not practice (DNP) |
| Blank | Did not arrive (DNA) |
| Blank | Excluded (EX) |

**Bold** – Pole
Italics – Fastest Lap

=== Teams' championship ===
| Pos | Team | Points |
|---|---|---|
| 1 | JDX Racing | 353 |
| 2 | Global Racing Group | 342 |
| 3 | Primus Racing Team | 325 |
| 4 | MVM Motorsports | 181 |
| 5 | Momentum Motorsports | 128 |
| 6 | Group–A Racing | 111 |
| 7 | Bamford Motorsports with Rice Racing Prep | 20 |
| 8 | DRG | 18 |
