= Michael Belov =

Russian racing driver (born 2001)

- Михаэль Белов
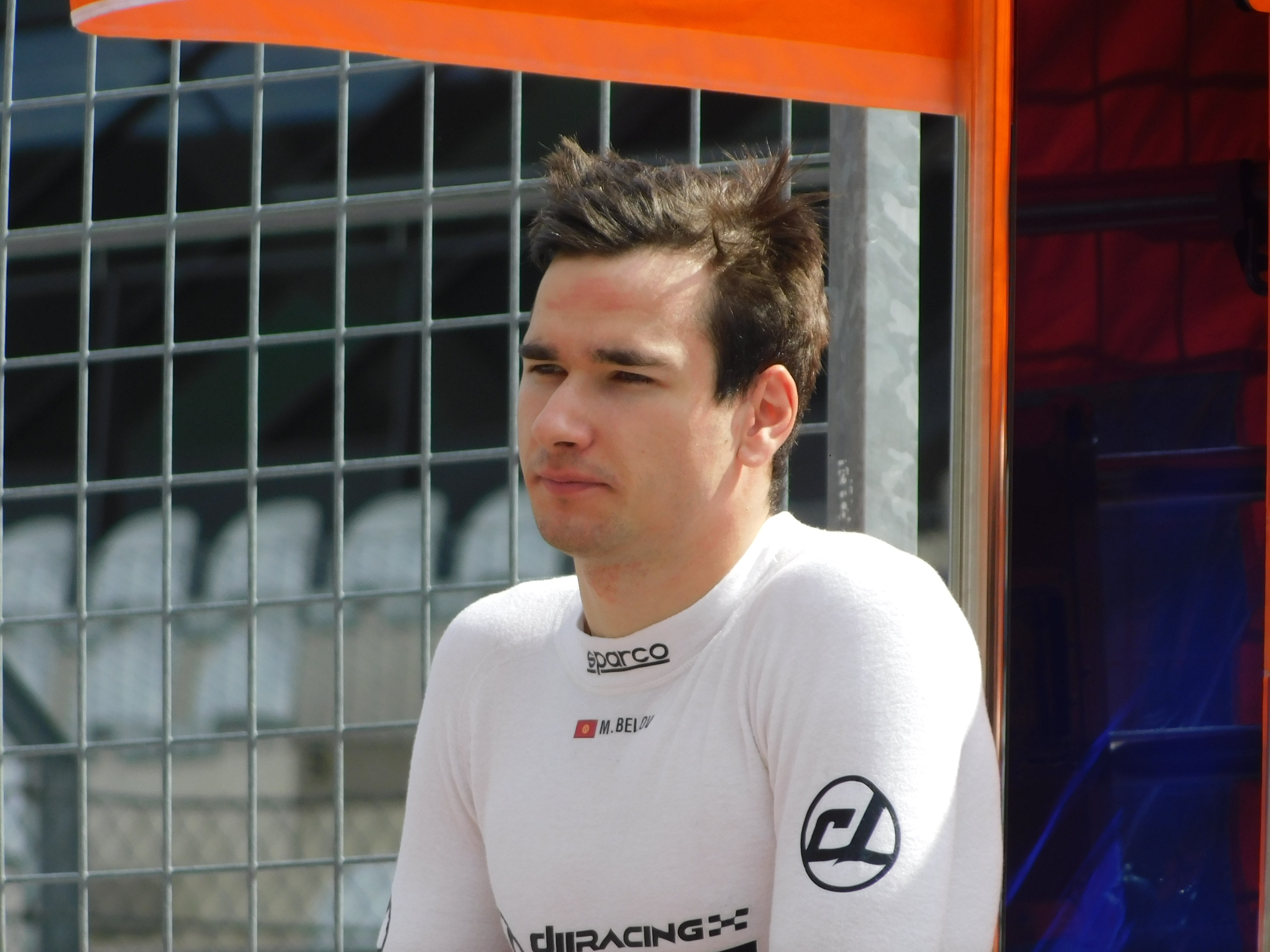
- Belov in 2025
- Born: Michael Arnoldovich Belov; 21 November 2001 (age 24); Lyubertsy, Moscow, Russia
- Nationality: (Russia) Russian; (Kyrgyzstan) Kyrgyz (Note: Following the Russian invasion of Ukraine in 2022, the FIA banned competitors from racing under the Russian and Belarusian flags; Belov opted to compete under a Kyrgyz licence, rather than compete neutrally.)

Formula Regional European Championship career
- Debut season: 2021
- Current team: CL Motorsport
- Categorisation: FIA Silver
- Car number: 20
- Former teams: JD, G4, MP, Trident
- Starts: 63
- Wins: 2
- Podiums: 6
- Poles: 2
- Fastest laps: 4
- Best finish: 7th in 2022

Previous series
- 2022; 2020; 2020; 2020; 2019; 2019; 2018; 2017–2018: FR Asian; FIA Formula 3; Formula Renault Eurocup; F3 Asian; Italian F4; ADAC F4; Formula Academy Finland; SMP F4

Championship titles
- 2018: Formula Academy Finland
- Statistics up to date as of 27 October 2025.

Michael Arnoldovich Belov (Russian: Михаэль Арнольдович Белов, romanized: Mikhael Arnoldovich Belov; born 21 November 2001) is a Russian racing driver who last competed under the Kyrgyz flag in the Formula Regional European Championship for CL Motorsport.

Born in Lyubertsy, Belov debuted in SMP F4 in 2017 and 2018. He won his first title in Formula Academy Finland in the latter year. After another season in Italian and ADAC Formula 4, he progressed to Formula Three and Formula Renault 2.0, contesting the F3 Asian Championship, the Eurocup, and FIA Formula 3. He moved to Formula Regional European in 2021, where he achieved multiple victories and finished eighth overall. He improved to seventh the following year with MP and has retained his place in the series through 2025.

== Career ==
=== Formula 4 ===
Belov started his professional single-seater career in the SMP F4 Championship in 2017 with the SMP Racing team. Belov claimed his first podium finish on the final race of the season with a third-place, finishing eighth overall in the championship. He continued in the championship for the 2018 season, claiming his first win at the second round in the NRING Circuit, winning races 1 and 3. He ended the season with five wins, finishing second in the championship behind Konsta Lappalainen.

In 2019, Belov joined the Italian F4 Championship with the Italian Bhai Tech Racing team. He finished on the podium in the first two races. It was later announced that he would also contest the 2019 ADAC Formula 4 Championship starting from the second round. Belov won one race in ADAC F4 at the Sachsenring, finishing eighth in the championship. Belov failed to win during his Italian F4 campaign, however, finished second on five occasions, ending the season fourth in the championship.

=== Formula Renault ===
At the end of 2019, Belov participated in the post-season Formula Renault Eurocup rookie test. Due to the COVID-19 pandemic, the 2020 Formula Renault Eurocup season was disrupted and postponed. As a consequence, Reece Ushijima, who was previously announced to drive for Belgian team M2 Competition withdrew due to travel restrictions. On 2 July 2020, M2 Competition announced that Belov would drive for them for the full 2020 season.

=== FIA Formula 3 Championship ===
Following the Barcelona round of the 2020 FIA Formula 3 Championship, David Schumacher left Charouz Racing System to join Carlin Racing instead. Belov was brought in to replace him for the remainder of the Formula 3 season. Belov remained with the team throughout post-season and pre-season testing and was expected to be given a drive for the 2021 season, however, Enzo Fittipaldi was announced instead.

=== Formula Regional ===
==== 2021 ====
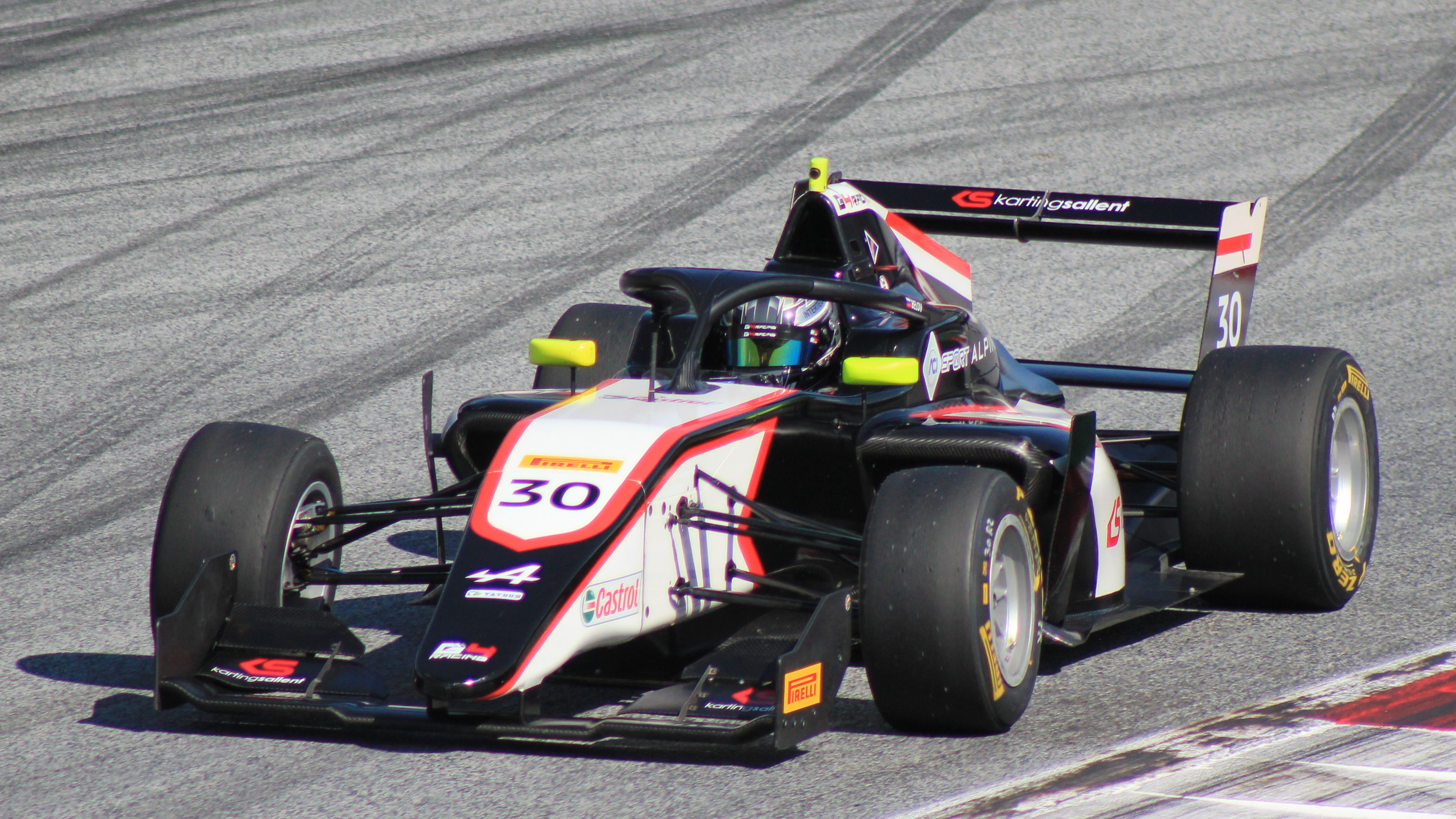
Belov racing in the 2021 Formula Regional European Championship at the Red Bull Ring.

Belov joined JD Motorsport in the 2021 Formula Regional European Championship as a wildcard entrant for the fourth round at Circuit Paul Ricard. Despite not being eligible for points, he had a strong race weekend and earned two podium finishes. Following this, it was announced Belov would race with G4 Racing for the remainder of the championship. Belov secured two victories and ending the campaign eighth.

==== 2022 ====
Belov joined the 2022 Formula Regional Asian Championship for the final three rounds of the season. He scored a second place in his second race and was 12th in the championship.

Belov would sign with MP Motorsport for his second season in the Formula Regional European Championship. After a podium in the opening round in Monza, Belov was forced to stop his campaign halfway through the season due to travel issues. Nevertheless, he placed seventh in the standings.

==== 2023 ====
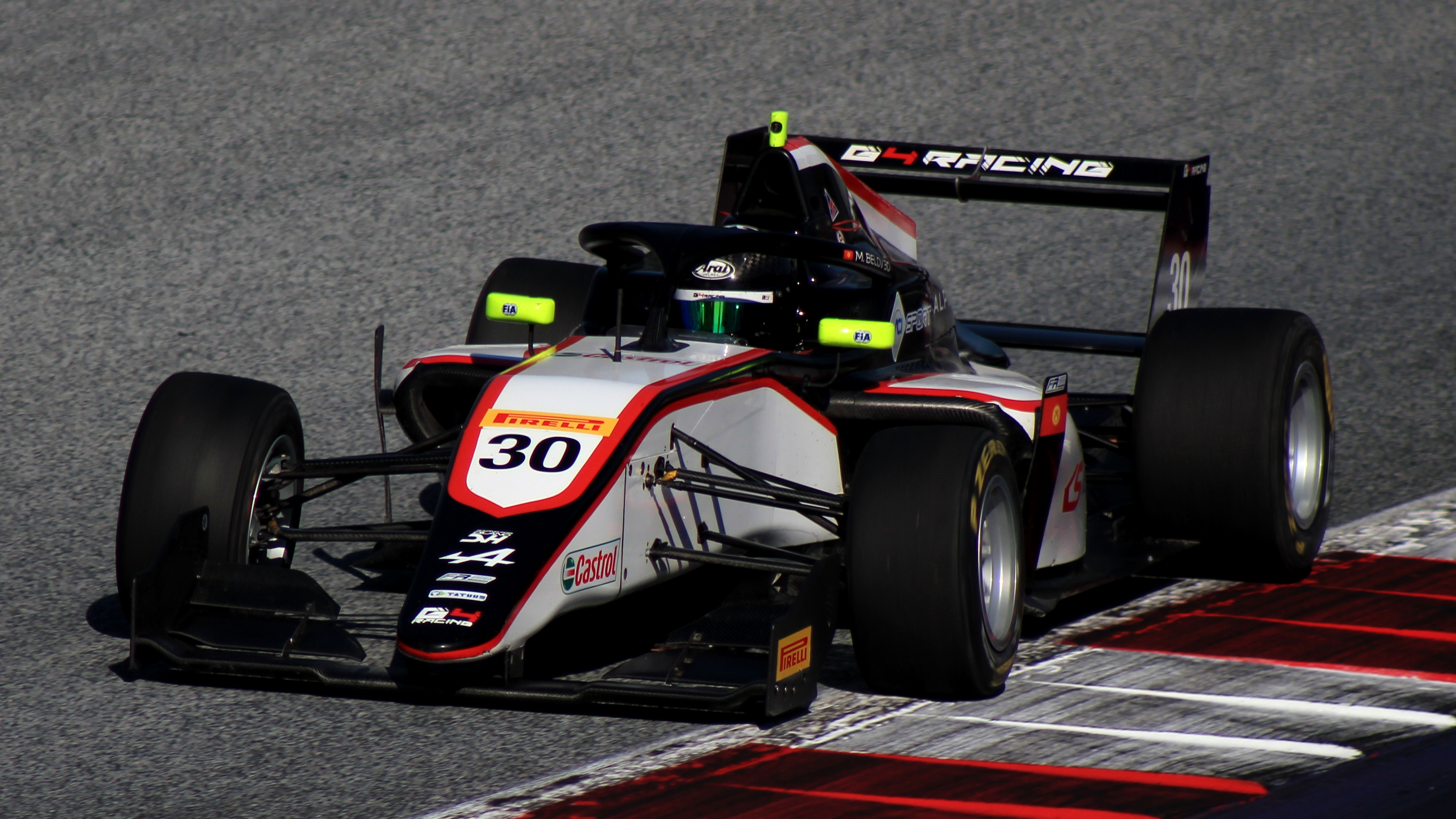
Belov racing in the 2023 Formula Regional European Championship at the Red Bull Ring.

Belov made a surprise return to the Formula Regional European Championship in 2023 with G4 Racing. However, he was unable to finish the season once again and sat out for the final two rounds. He finished 20th in the overall standings with 23 points.

==== 2024 ====
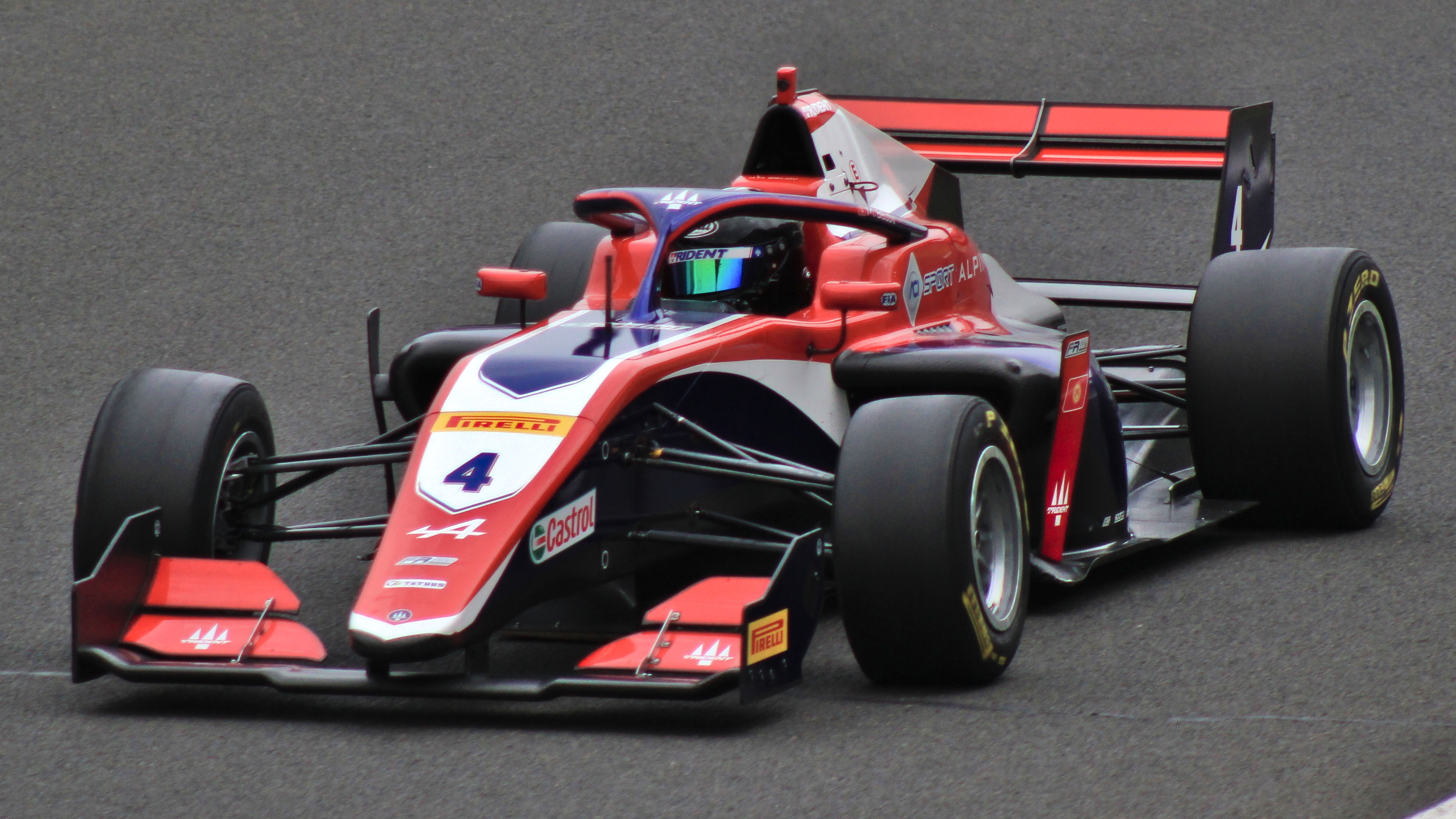
Belov driving at the Hungaroring during the 2024 Formula Regional European Championship

In 2024, Belov made a stand-in return in the Formula Regional European Championship for Trident, deputising for an injured Roman Bilinski. In three rounds, he scored a second-placed podium in which he stated he needed that to "revive career" after periods of financial struggles and the fallout from the Russian invasion of Ukraine.

==== 2025 ====
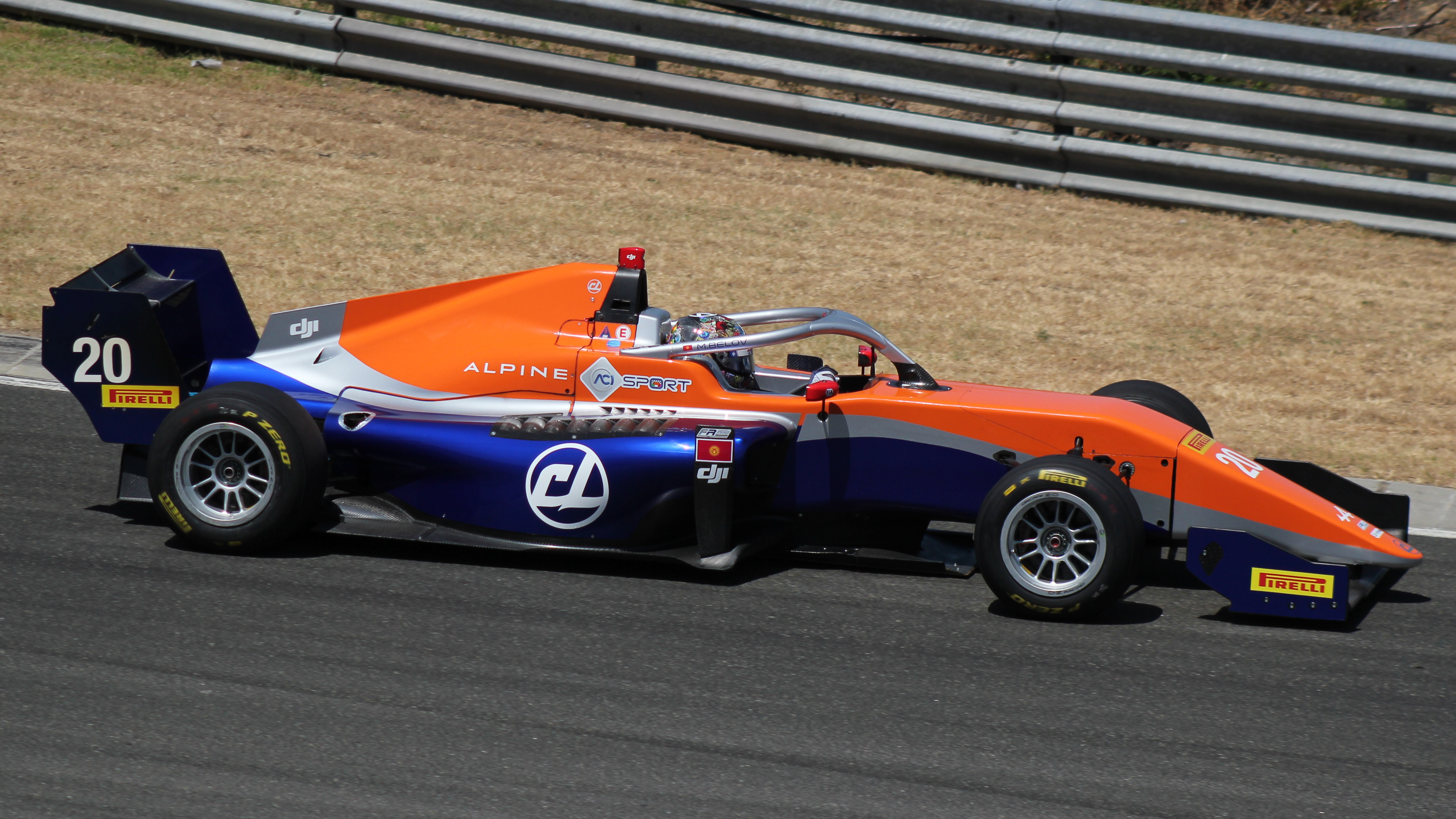
Belov driving at the Hungaroring during the 2025 Formula Regional European Championship

In May 2025, CL Motorsport announced that Belov would join the team for the second round of the Formula Regional European Championship at Spa.

==== 2026 ====
During the winter, Belov competed in the Formula Regional Middle East Trophy, continuing with CL Motorsport. However, after just one round, where he had crashed into Reza Seewooruthun and subsequently missed the third race in Yas Marina, Belov departed the team.

=== Eurocup-3 ===
==== 2024 ====
In October 2024, Belov was called by Drivex to make his Eurocup-3 debut for the Jerez round.

==== 2025 ====
In 2025, Belov made a cameo appearance in Eurocup-3 in Assen. He joined the grid again with Drivex during the season finale in Barcelona.

== Karting record ==
=== Karting career summary ===
| Season | Series | Position |
|---|---|---|
| 2014 | Sodi W Series Finals — Junior Cup | 1st |
| 2015 | Euro Finale — Mini Max Small | 2nd |

== Racing record ==
=== Racing career summary ===
| Season | Series | Team | Races | Wins | Poles | F/Laps | Podiums | Points | Position |
|---|---|---|---|---|---|---|---|---|---|
| 2017 | SMP F4 Championship | SMP Racing | 20 | 0 | 0 | 0 | 1 | 104 | 8th |
| 2018 | SMP F4 Championship | SMP Racing | 21 | 5 | 4 | 7 | 11 | 275 | **2nd** |
| 2018 | Formula Academy Finland | N/A | 10 | 2 | 2 | 3 | 7 | 164 | **1st** |
| 2019 | Italian F4 Championship | Bhai Tech Racing | 21 | 0 | 0 | 1 | 7 | 179 | 4th |
| 2019 | ADAC Formula 4 Championship | R-ace GP | 17 | 1 | 0 | 1 | 2 | 122 | 8th |
| 2019–20 | F3 Asian Championship | BlackArts Racing Team | 3 | 0 | 0 | 1 | 0 | 39 | 11th |
| 2020 | Formula Renault Eurocup | M2 Competition | 4 | 0 | 0 | 0 | 0 | 40 | 13th |
| 2020 | Formula Renault Eurocup | R-ace GP | 6 | 0 | 0 | 0 | 0 | 40 | 13th |
| 2020 | FIA Formula 3 Championship | Charouz Racing System | 6 | 0 | 0 | 0 | 0 | 1 | 23rd |
| 2021 | Formula Regional European Championship | JD Motorsport | 2 | 0 | 0 | 1 | 2 | 116 | 8th |
| 2021 | Formula Regional European Championship | G4 Racing | 11 | 2 | 2 | 3 | 3 | 116 | 8th |
| 2022 | Formula Regional Asian Championship | Evans GP | 9 | 0 | 0 | 0 | 1 | 55 | 12th |
| 2022 | Formula Regional European Championship | MP Motorsport | 10 | 0 | 0 | 0 | 2 | 93 | 7th |
| 2022 | Russian Endurance Challenge - GT Pro | IY Engineering & Mospolytech | 1 | 0 | 0 | 0 | 1 | N/A | **3rd** |
| 2023 | Formula Regional European Championship | G4 Racing | 16 | 0 | 0 | 1 | 0 | 23 | 20th |
| 2024 | Formula Regional European Championship | Trident | 6 | 0 | 0 | 0 | 1 | 26 | 19th |
| 2024 | Eurocup-3 | Drivex | 2 | 0 | 0 | 0 | 0 | 0 | NC† |
| 2025 | Formula Regional European Championship | CL Motorsport | 18 | 0 | 0 | 0 | 0 | 27 | 15th |
| 2025 | Eurocup-3 | Allay Racing | 2 | 0 | 0 | 0 | 1 | 28 | 15th |
| 2025 | Eurocup-3 | Drivex | 2 | 0 | 0 | 0 | 0 | 28 | 15th |
| 2026 | Formula Regional Middle East Trophy | CL Motorsport | 2 | 0 | 0 | 0 | 0 | 0 | 35th |

* Season still in progress.

=== Complete SMP F4 Championship results ===
(key) (Races in bold indicate pole position) (Races in italics indicate fastest lap)

| Year | Team | 1 | 2 | 3 | 4 | 5 | 6 | 7 | 8 | 9 | 10 | 11 | 12 | 13 | 14 | 15 | 16 | 17 | 18 | 19 | 20 | 21 | Pos | Points |
|---|---|---|---|---|---|---|---|---|---|---|---|---|---|---|---|---|---|---|---|---|---|---|---|---|
| 2017 | SMP Racing | SOC; 1; 9 | SOC; 2; 9 | SOC; 3; 8 | SMO; 1; 9 | SMO; 2; 4 | SMO; 3 Ret | AHV; 1; 4 | AHV; 2; 4 | AHV; 3; 9 | AUD; 1 DNS | AUD; 2 Ret | AUD; 3; 4 | MSC1; 1; 7 | MSC1; 2; 6 | MSC1; 3; 5 | MSC2; 1 Ret | MSC2; 2; 5 | MSC2; 3; 4 | ASS; 1; 10 | ASS; 2; 13 | ASS; 3; 3 | 8th | 104 |
| 2018 | SMP Racing | SMO; 1; 5 | SMO; 2; 4 | SMO; 3; 4 | NRG; 1; 1 | NRG; 2 Ret | **NRG**; **3**; 1 | MSC; 1; 4 | MSC; 2; 7 | MSC; 3; 7 | ADM; 1; 3 | ADM; 2; 2 | ADM; 3; 3 | **AHV**; **1**; 2 | **AHV**; **2**; 5 | **AHV**; **3**; 1 | ALA; 1; 2 | **ALA**; **2**; 1 | **ALA**; **3**; 2 | ASS; 1; 1 | **ASS**; **2**; 4 | ASS; 3 Ret | 2nd | 275 |

=== Complete Italian F4 Championship results ===
(key) (Races in bold indicate pole position) (Races in italics indicate fastest lap)

| Year | Team | 1 | 2 | 3 | 4 | 5 | 6 | 7 | 8 | 9 | 10 | 11 | 12 | 13 | 14 | 15 | 16 | 17 | 18 | 19 | 20 | 21 | 22 | Pos | Points |
|---|---|---|---|---|---|---|---|---|---|---|---|---|---|---|---|---|---|---|---|---|---|---|---|---|---|
| 2019 | Bhai Tech Racing | VLL; 1; 2 | VLL; 2; 3 | VLL; 3; 28 | MIS; 1; 9 | MIS; 2; 7 | MIS; 3 C | HUN; 1; 7 | HUN; 2; 2 | HUN; 3; 18 | RBR; 1 Ret | RBR; 2; 11 | RBR; 3; 10 | IMO; 1; 3 | IMO; 2; 4 | IMO; 3; 2 | IMO; 4; 5 | MUG; 1; 5 | MUG; 2; 9 | MUG; 3; 5 | MNZ; 1; 2 | MNZ; 2; 2 | MNZ; 3 Ret | 4th | 179 |

=== Complete ADAC Formula 4 Championship results ===
(key) (Races in bold indicate pole position) (Races in italics indicate fastest lap)

| Year | Team | 1 | 2 | 3 | 4 | 5 | 6 | 7 | 8 | 9 | 10 | 11 | 12 | 13 | 14 | 15 | 16 | 17 | 18 | 19 | 20 | Pos | Points |
|---|---|---|---|---|---|---|---|---|---|---|---|---|---|---|---|---|---|---|---|---|---|---|---|
| 2019 | R-ace GP | OSC; 1 | OSC; 2 | OSC; 3 | RBR; 1; 13 | RBR; 2; 20 | RBR; 3; 12 | HOC; 1; 4 | HOC; 2 Ret | ZAN; 1; 6 | ZAN; 2; 5 | ZAN; 3; 5 | NÜR; 1; 6 | NÜR; 2; 2 | NÜR; 3; 8 | HOC; 1 Ret | HOC; 2; 5 | HOC; 3; 4 | SAC; 1; 1 | SAC; 2; 9 | SAC; 3; 14 | 8th | 122 |

=== Complete Formula Regional Asian Championship / Formula Regional Middle East Trophy results ===
(key) (Races in bold indicate pole position) (Races in italics indicate fastest lap)

| Year | Team | 1 | 2 | 3 | 4 | 5 | 6 | 7 | 8 | 9 | 10 | 11 | 12 | 13 | 14 | 15 | DC | Points |
|---|---|---|---|---|---|---|---|---|---|---|---|---|---|---|---|---|---|---|
| 2019–20 | BlackArts Racing Team | SEP; 1 | SEP; 2 | SEP; 3 | DUB; 1 | DUB; 2 | DUB; 3 | ABU; 1 | ABU; 2 | ABU; 3 | SEP; 1 | SEP; 2 | SEP; 3 | CHA; 1; 4 | CHA; 2; 5 | CHA; 3; 4 | 11th | 39 |
| 2022 | Evans GP | ABU; 1 | ABU; 2 | ABU; 3 | DUB; 1 | DUB; 2 | DUB; 3 | DUB; 1; 10 | DUB; 2; 2 | DUB; 3; 6 | DUB; 1; 15 | DUB; 2; 6 | DUB; 3; 5 | ABU; 1; 14 | ABU; 1; 6 | ABU; 1; 9 | 12th | 55 |
| 2026 | CL Motorsport | YMC1; 1; 18 | YMC1; 2 Ret | YMC1; 3 DNS | YMC2; 1 | YMC2; 2 | YMC2; 3 | DUB; 1 | DUB; 2 | DUB; 3 | LUS; 1 | LUS; 2 | LUS; 3 | | | | 35th | 0 |

=== Complete Formula Renault Eurocup results ===
(key) (Races in bold indicate pole position) (Races in italics indicate fastest lap)

| Year | Team | 1 | 2 | 3 | 4 | 5 | 6 | 7 | 8 | 9 | 10 | 11 | 12 | 13 | 14 | 15 | 16 | 17 | 18 | 19 | 20 | DC | Points |
|---|---|---|---|---|---|---|---|---|---|---|---|---|---|---|---|---|---|---|---|---|---|---|---|
| 2020 | M2 Competition | MNZ; 1; 5 | MNZ; 2; 4 | IMO; 1; 10 | IMO; 2 Ret | NÜR; 1 | NÜR; 2 | MAG; 1 | MAG; 2 | ZAN; 1 | ZAN; 2 | CAT; 1 | CAT; 2 | SPA; 1 | SPA; 2 | | | | | | | 13th | 40 |
| 2020 | R-ace GP | | | | | | | | | | | | | | | IMO; 1; 11 | IMO; 2; 10 | HOC; 1; 14 | HOC; 2; 6 | LEC; 1; 15 | LEC; 2; 6 | 13th | 40 |

=== Complete FIA Formula 3 Championship results ===
(key) (Races in bold indicate pole position; races in italics indicate points for the fastest lap of top ten finishers)

| Year | Entrant | 1 | 2 | 3 | 4 | 5 | 6 | 7 | 8 | 9 | 10 | 11 | 12 | 13 | 14 | 15 | 16 | 17 | 18 | DC | Points |
|---|---|---|---|---|---|---|---|---|---|---|---|---|---|---|---|---|---|---|---|---|---|
| 2020 | Charouz Racing System | RBR; FEA | RBR; SPR | RBR; FEA | RBR; SPR | HUN; FEA | HUN; SPR | SIL; FEA | SIL; SPR | SIL; FEA | SIL; SPR | CAT; FEA | CAT; SPR | SPA; FEA; 20 | SPA; SPR; Ret | MNZ; FEA; 10 | MNZ; SPR; 13 | MUG; FEA; 27 | MUG; SPR; 23 | 23rd | 1 |

=== Complete Formula Regional European Championship results ===
(key) (Races in bold indicate pole position) (Races in italics indicate fastest lap)

| Year | Team | 1 | 2 | 3 | 4 | 5 | 6 | 7 | 8 | 9 | 10 | 11 | 12 | 13 | 14 | 15 | 16 | 17 | 18 | 19 | 20 | DC | Points |
|---|---|---|---|---|---|---|---|---|---|---|---|---|---|---|---|---|---|---|---|---|---|---|---|
| 2021 | JD Motorsport | IMO; 1 | IMO; 2 | CAT; 1 | CAT; 2 | MCO; 1 | MCO; 2 | LEC; 1; 2 | LEC; 2; 2 | | | | | | | | | | | | | 8th | 116 (Note: Belov was ineligible to score points at Le Castellet as he competed as a guest driver.) |
| 2021 | G4 Racing | | | | | | | | | ZAN; 1; 9 | ZAN; 2 DNS | **SPA**; **1**; 1 | SPA; 2; 5 | RBR; 1; 6 | RBR; 2 Ret | VAL; 1; 5 | **VAL**; **2**; 1 | MUG; 1; 2 | MUG; 2; 4 | MNZ; 1; 9 | MNZ; 2; 8 | 8th | 116 |
| 2022 | MP Motorsport | MNZ; 1; 2 | MNZ; 2; 5 | IMO; 1; 15 | IMO; 2; 5 | MCO; 1; 5 | MCO; 2; 6 | LEC; 1; 3 | LEC; 2; 6 | ZAN; 1; 7 | ZAN; 2; 6 | HUN; 1 | HUN; 2 | SPA; 1 | SPA; 2 | RBR; 1 | RBR; 2 | CAT; 1 | CAT; 2 | MUG; 1 | MUG; 2 | 7th | 93 |
| 2023 | G4 Racing | IMO; 1; 10 | IMO; 2 Ret | CAT; 1; 9 | CAT; 2; 10 | HUN; 1; 4 | HUN; 2; 26† | SPA; 1; 11 | SPA; 2; 14 | MUG; 1; 15 | MUG; 2; 9 | LEC; 1; 9 | LEC; 2; 13 | RBR; 1; 9 | RBR; 2; 10 | MNZ; 1 Ret | MNZ; 2; 17 | ZAN; 1 | ZAN; 2 | HOC; 1 | HOC; 2 | 20th | 23 |
| 2024 | Trident | HOC; 1 | HOC; 2 | SPA; 1 | SPA; 2 | ZAN; 1 | ZAN; 2 | HUN; 1; 12 | HUN; 2; 11 | MUG; 1; 6 | MUG; 2; 12 | LEC; 1; 2 | LEC; 2 Ret | IMO; 1 | IMO; 2 | RBR; 1 | RBR; 2 | CAT; 1 | CAT; 2 | MNZ; 1 | MNZ; 2 | 19th | 26 |
| 2025 | CL Motorsport | MIS; 1 | MIS; 2 | SPA; 1; 12 | SPA; 2 Ret | ZAN; 1; 11 | ZAN; 2; 20 | HUN; 1; 15 | HUN; 2; 7 | LEC; 1; 11 | LEC; 2; 17 | IMO; 1; 10 | IMO; 2; 7 | RBR; 1; 11 | RBR; 2; 17 | CAT; 1; 15 | CAT; 2; 6 | HOC; 1; 20 | HOC; 2; 13 | MNZ; 1 Ret | MNZ; 2; 8 | 15th | 27 |

=== Complete Eurocup-3 results ===
(key) (Races in bold indicate pole position) (Races in italics indicate fastest lap)

| Year | Team | 1 | 2 | 3 | 4 | 5 | 6 | 7 | 8 | 9 | 10 | 11 | 12 | 13 | 14 | 15 | 16 | 17 | 18 | DC | Points |
|---|---|---|---|---|---|---|---|---|---|---|---|---|---|---|---|---|---|---|---|---|---|
| 2024 | Drivex | SPA; 1 | SPA; 2 | RBR; 1 | RBR; 2 | POR; 1 | POR; 2 | POR; 3 | LEC; 1 | LEC; 2 | ZAN; 1 | ZAN; 2 | ARA; 1 | ARA; 2 | JER; 1; 5 | JER; 2; 7 | CAT; 1 | CAT; 2 | | NC† | 0 |
| 2025 | Allay Racing | RBR; 1 | RBR; 2 | POR; 1 | POR; SR | POR; 2 | LEC; 1 | LEC; SR | LEC; 2 | MNZ; 1 | MNZ; 2 | ASS; 1; 2 | ASS; 2 Ret | SPA; 1 | SPA; 2 | JER; 1 | JER; 2 | | | 15th | 28 |
| 2025 | Drivex | | | | | | | | | | | | | | | | | CAT; 1; 23† | CAT; 2; 5 | 15th | 28 |

† As Belov was a guest driver, he was ineligible to score points.
