= Cameron Das =

American racing driver (born 2000)

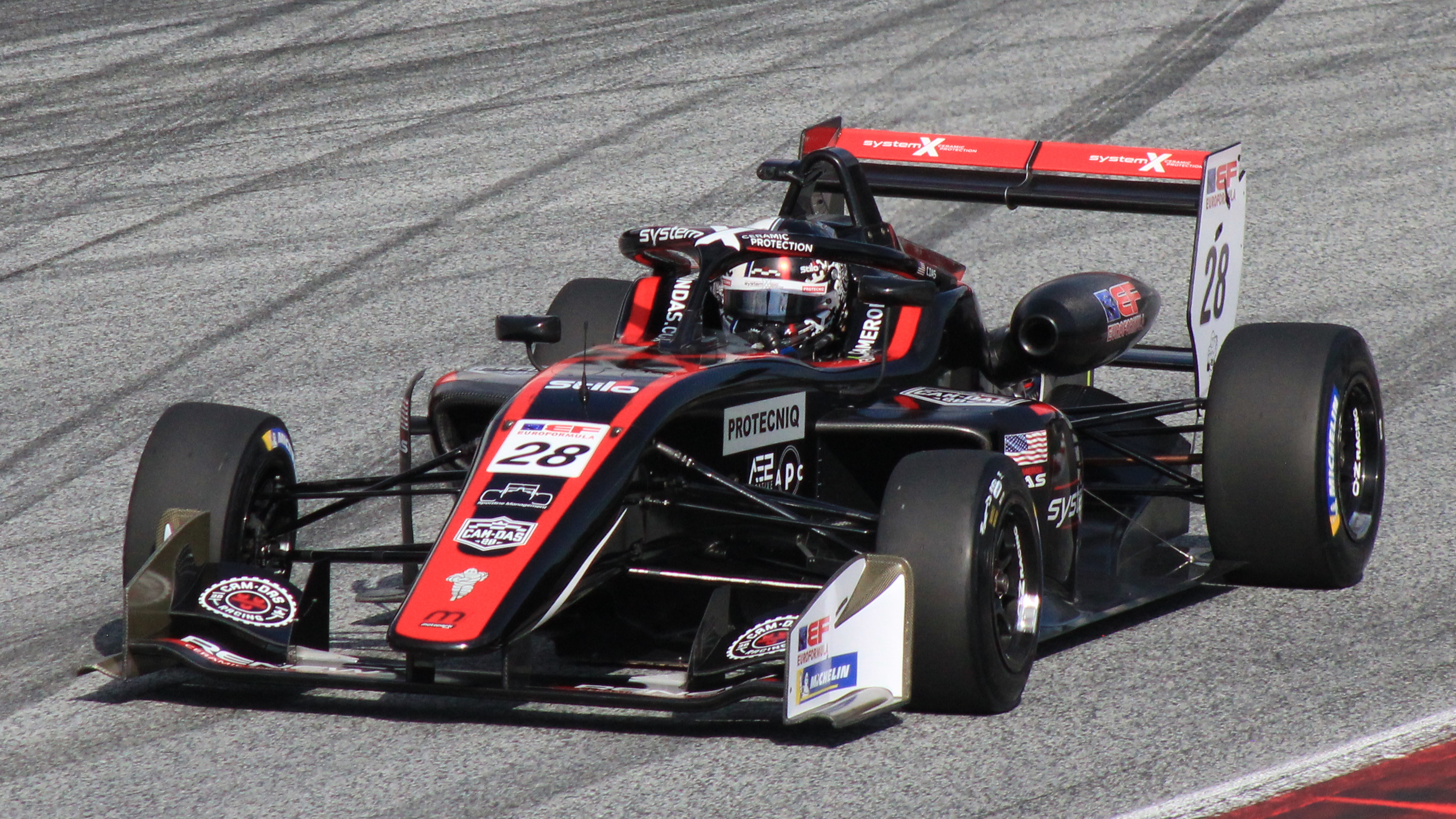
- Das driving in the 2021 Euroformula Open Championship at the Red Bull Ring
- Nationality: (United States) American
- Born: 17 March 2000 (age 26) Baltimore, Maryland, U.S.

FIA Formula 3 Championship career
- Debut season: 2020
- Categorisation: FIA Silver
- Car number: 28
- Former teams: Carlin
- Starts: 18 (18 entries)
- Wins: 0
- Podiums: 0
- Poles: 0
- Fastest laps: 0
- Best finish: 25th in 2020

Previous series
- 2018–19 2017–20 2017 2016–17 2016: Toyota Racing Series; Euroformula Open Championship; BRDC British F3 Championship; U.S. F2000 National Championship; F4 United States Championship

Championship titles
- 2021 2016: Euroformula Open Championship; F4 United States Championship

Cameron Das (born March 17, 2000) is an American former racing driver and content creator who last competed in the 2021 Euroformula Open Championship with Team Motopark. In 2016 Das became the first champion of the United States Formula 4 Championship.

== Career ==
=== Karting and national championships ===
Das started karting at Autobahn Indoor Speedway in Jessup, Maryland. In 2015, Das earned his licence to compete in single seaters at the Bertil Roos Racing School. Das made his competition debut in the Bertil Roos Race Series at Pocono Raceway east road course. After scoring his first pole position at NJMP Thunderbolt, Das finished fifteenth in the series standings competing a partial schedule. Coached by Jonathan Scarallo, Das scored five podium finishes. Besides the Bertil Roos Race Series the young driver competed at the Carolina Motorsports Park round of the 2015 Formula Lites season. Racing a Crawford FL15 powered by a Honda K24 engine Das finished fifth in both races. Das also competed in the Formula F class of the SCCA Majors Tour Northeast Conference at New Jersey Motorsports Park, winning the second race. With K-Hill Motorsports, Das raced in the New Jersey Motorsports Park with seventh as his best result.

=== Lower formula ===
==== 2016 ====
For 2016, Das joined JDX Racing to race the inaugural United States Formula 4 Championship, which replaced the Formula Lites series. Having scored his first win in car racing at Mid-Ohio, the Maryland native dominated the second half of the campaign, winning eight successive races and taking the title at the season finale. Das also raced with JAY Motorsports for a partial U.S. F2000 National Championship the same year. His best result was an eighth place at the Toronto street course.

==== 2017 ====
After making his first appearance on the European scene in the BRDC British Formula 3 Autumn Trophy at the end of 2016, Das moved into the BRDC British F3 series with Carlin in 2017, partnering Enaam Ahmed and James Pull. The American started his season off strongly, taking a pole position and a podium respectively in the opening weekend at Oulton Park, before scoring a triple of podiums at the following round in Rockingham, which included a victory in Race 2. Another podium came at Snetterton, whilst the subsequent pair of events yielded consistent finishes in the top-seven. Das took another podium at Brands Hatch with second place in Race 3, before capping off his season with another podium and pole position at the finale in Donington. He ended up fifth in the championship, having scored seven podiums.

During the second half of the year, Das also took part in the Euroformula Open Championship with Campos Racing. Having finished eighth on three occasions, Das finished 15th in the standings.

=== Euroformula Open ===
==== 2018 ====
Das took part in the Toyota Racing Series in preparation for his 2018 campaign. Contesting the winter series for Victory Motor Racing, Das took a best finish of seventh at Taupo and ended up 12th in the championship, having won an award for the best overtake of the TRS season.

Das' main campaign would lie in Euroformula Open, where he would reunite with Carlin Motorsport. Starting out at Estoril, he scored his first podium of the race in the season opener, finishing third after fighting his way through from sixth on the grid. Two sixth places followed, before Das found himself on the rostrum again at Paul Ricard, having overtaken Guilherme Samaia for third place. The two rounds ahead of the summer break, at Spa-Francorchamps and Budapest, yielded points finishes, before another podium came at Silverstone after a two-month break. His final podium of the season came at Monza the round after, as Das bounced back from a retirement caused by a collision in Race 1. Following more points at Jerez, Das proved his worth during the final race of the year in Barcelona, where, having been tagged early by teammate Matheus Iorio and fallen down to 15th place, the American was able to claw his way to fifth by the end of the race, which ultimately saw him cement himself in fifth place overall.

==== 2019 ====
After another appearance in the Toyota Racing Series at the start of 2019, where Das took a sole race win at Manfield and finished seventh in the standings for M2 Competition, he began his season in Euroformula Open with Fortec Motorsports. However, after just four events, Das announced that he would be contesting the remainder of the campaign for Team Motopark. His season proved to be disappointing, with a fifth place at Silverstone being the highlight of Das's year, which he ended twelfth in the championship.

=== FIA Formula 3 ===
Das progressed into FIA Formula 3 in 2020, partnering Clément Novalak and Enaam Ahmed at Carlin Buzz Racing, whilst fulfilling double-duties in the Euroformula Open Championship with Motopark. In F3, Das experienced a challenging season during which he failed to score points, with a pair of eleventh-placed finishes at Silverstone turning out to be his best results. Meanwhile, two podiums would come from his Euroformula campaign, which he finished sixth in the standings, having missed two events.

=== Return to Euroformula Open ===
In 2021, Das returned to the Euroformula Open Championship, pairing up with Jak Crawford at Motopark. He started his season out in perfect fashion, taking all three victories at the Formula One support event in Portimão, despite having to create a ten-second gap in Race 3 after being awarded a penalty. More success came at Le Castellet, where Das won another race, having battled hard in Race 3 with teammate Crawford, and finished the other two on the podium. The next round at Spa set back Das's championship aspirations, as, despite two second places, a retirement caused by a suspension failure and a clean sweep of victories from Louis Foster narrowed the gap at the top of the standings. Another retirement whilst in the lead of Race 1 at the Hungaroring, this time owing to a brake failure, compounded matters, in spite of which Das would be able to take another win in Race 3, that becoming his first ever wet-weather victory. At Imola, Das's car was affected by chassis damage, which meant that he could only finish on the podium in Race 3, whilst he was able to extend his championship lead in Austria after taking a second and third place respectively. The penultimate event, held at Monza, brought glory to the American, who, after taking his first pole position in the category, went on to win races 1 and 3, the latter of which being a race affected hugely by hydroplaning. A second place in Race 1 at Barcelona sealed the Euroformula Open title for Das, and he ended the season with another podium, bringing his tally up to 16.

== Racing record ==
=== Career summary ===
| Season | Series | Team | Races | Wins | Poles | F/Laps | Podiums | Points | Position |
|---|---|---|---|---|---|---|---|---|---|
| 2015 | Formula Lites | Howard Motorsports | 2 | 0 | 0 | 0 | 0 | 20 | 8th |
| 2016 | Formula 4 United States Championship | JDX Racing | 15 | 9 | 4 | 9 | 9 | 281 | **1st** |
| 2016 | U.S. F2000 National Championship | JAY Motorsports | 12 | 0 | 0 | 0 | 0 | 83 | 16th |
| 2016 | BRDC British Formula 3 Autumn Trophy | Carlin | 3 | 0 | 0 | 0 | 0 | 44 | 7th |
| 2017 | BRDC British Formula 3 Championship | Carlin | 24 | 1 | 2 | 3 | 7 | 425 | 5th |
| 2017 | Euroformula Open Championship | Campos Racing | 8 | 0 | 0 | 0 | 0 | 13 | 15th |
| 2017 | Spanish Formula 3 Championship | Campos Racing | 4 | 0 | 0 | 0 | 0 | 0 | NC† |
| 2017 | U.S. F2000 National Championship | Newman Wachs Racing | 2 | 0 | 0 | 0 | 0 | 25 | 28th |
| 2018 | Euroformula Open Championship | Carlin Motorsport | 16 | 0 | 0 | 1 | 4 | 159 | 5th |
| 2018 | Spanish Formula 3 Championship | Carlin Motorsport | 6 | 0 | 0 | 1 | 1 | 73 | **3rd** |
| 2018 | Toyota Racing Series | Victory Motor Racing | 15 | 0 | 0 | 0 | 0 | 438 | 12th |
| 2019 | Euroformula Open Championship | Fortec Motorsports | 8 | 0 | 0 | 0 | 0 | 54 | 12th |
| 2019 | Euroformula Open Championship | Team Motopark | 10 | 0 | 0 | 1 | 0 | 54 | 12th |
| 2019 | Toyota Racing Series | M2 Competition | 15 | 1 | 0 | 2 | 2 | 205 | 7th |
| 2020 | FIA Formula 3 Championship | Carlin Buzz Racing | 18 | 0 | 0 | 0 | 0 | 0 | 25th |
| 2020 | Euroformula Open Championship | Team Motopark | 14 | 0 | 0 | 1 | 2 | 123 | 6th |
| 2021 | Euroformula Open Championship | Team Motopark | 24 | 7 | 1 | 6 | 16 | 382 | **1st** |
| 2025 | World Racing League - GPU | Automatic Racing | ? | ? | ? | ? | ? | 126 | 4th |

^{†} As Das was a guest driver, he was ineligible to score points.

=== Complete Formula 4 United States Championship results ===
(key) (Races in bold indicate pole position) (Races in italics indicate fastest lap)

| Year | Entrant | 1 | 2 | 3 | 4 | 5 | 6 | 7 | 8 | 9 | 10 | 11 | 12 | 13 | 14 | 15 | DC | Points |
|---|---|---|---|---|---|---|---|---|---|---|---|---|---|---|---|---|---|---|
| 2016 | JDX Racing | MOH1; 1; 5 | MOH1; 2; 4 | MOH1; 3; 4 | **MOH2**; **1**; 12 | MOH2; 2; 4 | MOH2; 3; 1 | **NJMP**; **1**; 5 | NJMP; 2; 1 | NJMP; 3; 1 | **ATL**; **1**; 1 | ATL; 2; 1 | ATL; 3; 1 | **HMS**; **1**; 1 | HMS; 2; 1 | HMS; 2; 1 | 1st | 281 |

=== Complete U.S. F2000 National Championship Results ===
| Year | Team | 1 | 2 | 3 | 4 | 5 | 6 | 7 | 8 | 9 | 10 | 11 | 12 | 13 | 14 | 15 | 16 | Rank | Points |
|---|---|---|---|---|---|---|---|---|---|---|---|---|---|---|---|---|---|---|---|
| 2016 | JAY Motorsports | STP | STP | BAR; 20 | BAR; 12 | IMS; 17 | IMS; 24 | LOR | ROA; 9 | ROA; 14 | TOR; 8 | TOR; 15 | MOH; DNS | MOH; 10 | MOH; 20 | LAG; 14 | LAG; 12 | 16th | 83 |
| 2017 | Newman Wachs Racing | STP; 8 | STP; 9 | BAR | BAR | IMS | IMS | ROA | ROA | IOW | TOR | TOR | MOH | MOH | WGL | | | 28th | 25 |

=== Complete BRDC British Formula 3 Championship results ===
(key) (Races in bold indicate pole position; races in italics indicate fastest lap)

| Year | Team | 1 | 2 | 3 | 4 | 5 | 6 | 7 | 8 | 9 | 10 | 11 | 12 | 13 | 14 | 15 | 16 | 17 | 18 | 19 | 20 | 21 | 22 | 23 | 24 | DC | Points |
|---|---|---|---|---|---|---|---|---|---|---|---|---|---|---|---|---|---|---|---|---|---|---|---|---|---|---|---|
| 2017 | Carlin | **OUL**; **1**; 5 | OUL; 2; 6 | OUL; 3; 2 | **ROC**; **1**; 2 | ROC; 2; 1 | **ROC**; **3**; 3 | SNE1; 1; 6 | SNE1; 2; 2 | SNE1; 3; 6 | SIL; 1; 6 | SIL; 2; 7 | SIL; 3; 5 | SPA; 1; 7 | SPA; 2; 4 | SPA; 3; 5 | BRH; 1 Ret | BRH; 2; 10 | BRH; 3; 2 | SNE2; 1; 6 | SNE2; 2; 15 | SNE2; 3; 8 | DON; 1; 3 | DON; 2; 4 | **DON**; **3**; 13 | 5th | 425 |

=== Complete Euroformula Open Championship results ===
(key) (Races in bold indicate pole position; races in italics indicate points for the fastest lap of top ten finishers)

| Year | Entrant | 1 | 2 | 3 | 4 | 5 | 6 | 7 | 8 | 9 | 10 | 11 | 12 | 13 | 14 | 15 | 16 | 17 | 18 | 19 | 20 | 21 | 22 | 23 | 24 | DC | Points |
|---|---|---|---|---|---|---|---|---|---|---|---|---|---|---|---|---|---|---|---|---|---|---|---|---|---|---|---|
| 2017 | Campos Racing | EST; 1 | EST; 2 | SPA; 1 | SPA; 2 | LEC; 1 | LEC; 2 | HUN; 1 | HUN; 2 | SIL; 1; 8 | SIL; 2 Ret | MNZ; 1; 10 | MNZ; 2; 8 | JER; 1; 11 | JER; 2; 8 | CAT; 1 Ret | CAT; 2; 14 | | | | | | | | | 15th | 13 |
| 2018 | Carlin Motorsport | EST; 1; 3 | EST; 2; 6 | LEC; 1; 6 | LEC; 2; 3 | SPA; 1 Ret | SPA; 2; 5 | HUN; 1; 5 | HUN; 2; 4 | SIL; 1; 6 | SIL; 2; 3 | MNZ; 1 Ret | MNZ; 2; 3 | JER; 1; 6 | JER; 2; 4 | CAT; 1; 6 | CAT; 2; 5 | | | | | | | | | 5th | 159 |
| 2019 | Fortec Motorsports | LEC; 1 Ret | LEC; 2; 15 | PAU; 1; 6 | PAU; 2; 8 | HOC; 1; 10 | HOC; 2; 10 | SPA; 1; 19 | SPA; 2; 18 | | | | | | | | | | | | | | | | | 12th | 54 |
| 2019 | Team Motopark | | | | | | | | | HUN; 1; 10 | HUN; 2; 14 | RBR; 1; 9 | RBR; 2; 8 | SIL; 1; 5 | SIL; 2; 6 | CAT; 1; 8 | CAT; 2; 12 | MNZ; 1; 6 | MNZ; 2 Ret | | | | | | | 12th | 54 |
| 2020 | Team Motopark | HUN; 1 | HUN; 2 | LEC; 1; 10 | LEC; 2; 8 | RBR; 1 | RBR; 2 | MNZ; 1; 5 | MNZ; 2; 5 | MNZ; 3; 6 | MUG; 1; 9 | MUG; 2; 7 | SPA; 1; 5 | SPA; 2; 4 | SPA; 3; 4 | CAT; 1; 7 | CAT; 2; 2 | CAT; 3; 3 | CAT; 4; 6 | | | | | | | 6th | 123 |
| 2021 | Team Motopark | POR; 1; 1 | POR; 2; 1 | POR; 3; 1 | LEC; 1; 2 | LEC; 2; 3 | LEC; 3; 1 | SPA; 1 Ret | SPA; 2; 2 | SPA; 3; 2 | HUN; 1 Ret | HUN; 2; 10 | HUN; 3; 1 | IMO; 1; 5 | IMO; 2; 13 | IMO; 3; 3 | RBR; 1; 3 | RBR; 2; 4 | RBR; 3; 2 | **MNZ**; **1**; 1 | MNZ; 2; 5 | MNZ; 3; 1 | CAT; 1; 2 | CAT; 2; 5 | CAT; 3; 2 | 1st | 382 |

* Season still in progress.

=== Complete Toyota Racing Series results ===
(key) (Races in bold indicate pole position) (Races in italics indicate fastest lap)

| Year | Team | 1 | 2 | 3 | 4 | 5 | 6 | 7 | 8 | 9 | 10 | 11 | 12 | 13 | 14 | 15 | 16 | 17 | DC | Points |
|---|---|---|---|---|---|---|---|---|---|---|---|---|---|---|---|---|---|---|---|---|
| 2018 | Victory Motor Racing | RUA; 1; 11 | RUA; 2 Ret | RUA; 3; 7 | TER; 1; 9 | TER; 2; 7 | TER; 3; 8 | HMP; 1; 11 | HMP; 2 Ret | HMP; 3; 7 | TAU; 1 Ret | TAU; 2; 11 | TAU; 3; 6 | MAN; 1; 11 | MAN; 2; 7 | MAN; 3; 11 | | | 12th | 438 |
| 2019 | M2 Competition | HIG; 1; 9 | HIG; 2; 6 | HIG; 3; 7 | TER; 1; 4 | TER; 2 C | TER; 3 C | HMP; 1 Ret | HMP; 2; 7 | HMP; 3; 5 | HMP; 4; 3 | TAU; 1; 15 | TAU; 2; 10 | TAU; 3; 5 | TAU; 4; 8 | MAN; 1; 7 | MAN; 2; 1 | MAN; 3 Ret | 7th | 205 |

=== Complete FIA Formula 3 Championship results ===
(key) (Races in bold indicate pole position) (Races in italics indicate fastest lap)

| Year | Entrant | 1 | 2 | 3 | 4 | 5 | 6 | 7 | 8 | 9 | 10 | 11 | 12 | 13 | 14 | 15 | 16 | 17 | 18 | DC | Points |
|---|---|---|---|---|---|---|---|---|---|---|---|---|---|---|---|---|---|---|---|---|---|
| 2020 | Carlin Buzz Racing | RBR; FEA; 22 | RBR; SPR; Ret | RBR; FEA; 24 | RBR; SPR; Ret | HUN; FEA; 17 | HUN; SPR; 22 | SIL; FEA; 21 | SIL; SPR; 24 | SIL; FEA; 11 | SIL; SPR; 11 | CAT; FEA; 19 | CAT; SPR; 17 | SPA; FEA; 25 | SPA; SPR; 22 | MNZ; FEA; 15 | MNZ; SPR; 16 | MUG; FEA; 23 | MUG; SPR; 25 | 25th | 0 |

Sporting positions
| Preceded by Inaugural | Formula 4 United States Championship; Champion; 2016 | Succeeded by Kyle Kirkwood |
| Preceded by Yifei Ye | Euroformula Open Championship; Champion; 2021 | Succeeded by Oliver Goethe |
