= 2022 Spa-Francorchamps Formula 2 round =

(Belgium) 2022 Spa-Francorchamps Formula 2 round
Round details
- Round 11 of 14 in the 2022 FIA Formula 2 Championship.
- Layout of the Circuit de Spa-Francorchamps
- Location: Circuit de Spa-Francorchamps, Stavelot, Belgium
- Course: Permanent racing facility 7.004 km (4.352 mi)

Sprint Race
- Date: 27 August 2022
- Laps: 18
Podium
First	(New Zealand) Liam Lawson	Carlin
Second	(Australia) Jack Doohan	Virtuosi Racing
Third	(Switzerland) Ralph Boschung	Campos Racing
Fastest lap
Driver	(New Zealand) Liam Lawson	Carlin
- Time: 2:01.740 (on lap 2)

Feature Race
- Date: 28 August 2022
- Laps: 25
Pole position
Driver	(Brazil) Felipe Drugovich	MP Motorsport
Time	1:58.232	
Podium
First	(Australia) Jack Doohan	Virtuosi Racing
Second	(Brazil) Felipe Drugovich	MP Motorsport
Third	(New Zealand) Liam Lawson	Carlin
Fastest lap
Driver	(India) Jehan Daruvala	Prema Racing
- Time: 2:00.677 (on lap 22)

The 2022 Spa-Francorchamps FIA Formula 2 round was a motor racing event held between 26 and 28 August 2022 at the Circuit de Spa-Francorchamps, Stavelot, Belgium. It was the eleventh round of the 2022 FIA Formula 2 Championship and was held in support of the 2022 Belgian Grand Prix.

== Driver changes ==
After competing in the previous two rounds, David Beckmann was announced to replace Jake Hughes at Van Amersfoort Racing for the remainder of the season. Beckmann was partnered by Amaury Cordeel, who returned to the series after serving his ban during the Hungary round.

Campos Racing driver Olli Caldwell was suspended from the eleventh round at Spa-Francorchamps after incurring twelve penalty points across the first ten rounds. This was second time a driver received a race ban in 2022, following Cordeel's in the previous round. Caldwell was replaced by Lirim Zendeli, who last raced in 2021 for MP Motorsport. Zendeli partnered Ralph Boschung, who returned from an extended period of injury.

Cem Bölükbaşı terminated his contract with Charouz Racing System by mutual consent prior to the Spa-Francorchamps round. His seat was taken by IndyCar Series racer Tatiana Calderón, who returned to Formula 2 after competing for BWT Arden in 2019.

== Classification ==
=== Qualifying ===
Felipe Drugovich took his third pole position of this season by nearly four tenths of a second, ahead of fellow Brazilian driver Enzo Fittipaldi and Logan Sargeant.

Pos.	No.	Driver	Entrant	Time	Grid SR	Grid FR
1	11	(Brazil) Felipe Drugovich	MP Motorsport	1:58.232	10	1
2	22	(Brazil) Enzo Fittipaldi	Charouz Racing System	+0.383	9	2
3	6	(United States) Logan Sargeant	Carlin	+0.549	8	3
4	3	(Australia) Jack Doohan	Virtuosi Racing	+0.551	7	4
5	24	(Germany) David Beckmann	Van Amersfoort Racing	+0.565	6	5
6	5	(New Zealand) Liam Lawson	Carlin	+0.744	5	6
7	20	(Netherlands) Richard Verschoor	Trident	+0.786	4	7
8	10	(France) Théo Pourchaire	ART Grand Prix	+0.829	3	8
9	2	(India) Jehan Daruvala	Prema Racing	+0.882	2	9
10	15	(Switzerland) Ralph Boschung	Campos Racing	+0.894	1	10
11	1	(Norway) Dennis Hauger	Prema Racing	+0.929	11	11
12	7	(New Zealand) Marcus Armstrong	Hitech Grand Prix	+0.945	12	12
13	17	(Japan) Ayumu Iwasa	DAMS	+0.947	13	13
14	9	(Denmark) Frederik Vesti	ART Grand Prix	+1.052	14	14
15	16	(Israel) Roy Nissany	DAMS	+1.070	15	15
16	12	(France) Clément Novalak	MP Motorsport	+1.148	16	16
17	4	(Japan) Marino Sato	Virtuosi Racing	+1.291	17	17
18	21	(Australia) Calan Williams	Trident	+1.294	18	18
19	14	(Germany) Lirim Zendeli	Campos Racing	+1.472	19	19
20	25	(Belgium) Amaury Cordeel	Van Amersfoort Racing	+1.588	20	20
21	23	(Colombia) Tatiana Calderón	Charouz Racing System	+2.299	21	21
107% time: 2:06.508 (+8.276)
—	8	(Estonia) Jüri Vips	Hitech Grand Prix	+38.439	22	22

=== Sprint race ===
Pos.	No.	Driver	Entrant	Laps	Time/Retired	Grid	Points
1	5	(New Zealand) Liam Lawson	Carlin	18	40:22.343	5	10 (1)
2	3	(Australia) Jack Doohan	Virtuosi Racing	18	+3.868	7	8
3	15	(Switzerland) Ralph Boschung	Campos Racing	18	+5.718	1	6
4	11	(Brazil) Felipe Drugovich	MP Motorsport	18	+6.360	10	5
5	20	(Netherlands) Richard Verschoor	Trident	18	+8.407	4	4
6	10	(France) Théo Pourchaire	ART Grand Prix	18	+8.686	3	3
7	7	(New Zealand) Marcus Armstrong	Hitech Grand Prix	18	+9.422	12	2
8	24	(Germany) David Beckmann	Van Amersfoort Racing	18	+10.065	6	1
9	17	(Japan) Ayumu Iwasa	DAMS	18	+10.833	13	
10	1	(Norway) Dennis Hauger	Prema Racing	18	+11.134	11	
11	16	(Israel) Roy Nissany	DAMS	18	+11.615	15	
12	4	(Japan) Marino Sato	Virtuosi Racing	18	+14.089	17	
13	22	(Brazil) Enzo Fittipaldi	Charouz Racing System	18	+15.801	9	
14	8	(Estonia) Jüri Vips	Hitech Grand Prix	18	+16.393	22	
15	9	(Denmark) Frederik Vesti	ART Grand Prix	18	+16.767	14	
16	21	(Australia) Calan Williams	Trident	18	+17.669	18	
17	12	(France) Clément Novalak	MP Motorsport	18	+18.552	16	
18	25	(Belgium) Amaury Cordeel	Van Amersfoort Racing	18	+18.594	20	
19	23	(Colombia) Tatiana Calderón	Charouz Racing System	18	+19.044	21	
20	14	(Germany) Lirim Zendeli	Campos Racing	18	+23.207	19	
DNF	6	(United States) Logan Sargeant	Carlin	10	Accident	8	
DNS	2	(India) Jehan Daruvala	Prema Racing	—	Did not start^{1}	—	
Fastest lap set by (New Zealand) Liam Lawson: 2:01.740 (lap 2)

Notes

- ^1 – Jehan Daruvala was supposed to start from second place, but failed to start the Sprint Race due to stalling during the reconnaissance lap. Thus, his grid slot has been left vacant.

=== Feature race ===
Pos.	No.	Driver	Entrant	Laps	Time/Retired	Grid	Points
1	3	(Australia) Jack Doohan	Virtuosi Racing	25	52:16.133	4	25
2	11	(Brazil) Felipe Drugovich	MP Motorsport	25	+1.942	1	18 (2)
3	5	(New Zealand) Liam Lawson	Carlin	25	+8.714	6	15
4	20	(Netherlands) Richard Verschoor	Trident	25	+12.479	7	12
5	6	(United States) Logan Sargeant	Carlin	25	+21.266	3	10
6	24	(Germany) David Beckmann	Van Amersfoort Racing	25	+22.365	5	8
7	17	(Japan) Ayumu Iwasa	DAMS	25	+22.498	13	6
8	8	(Estonia) Jüri Vips	Hitech Grand Prix	25	+23.899	22	4
9	12	(France) Clément Novalak	MP Motorsport	25	+24.746	16	2
10	22	(Brazil) Enzo Fittipaldi	Charouz Racing System	25	+25.481^{1}	2	1
11	9	(Denmark) Frederik Vesti	ART Grand Prix	25	+31.001	14	
12	1	(Norway) Dennis Hauger	Prema Racing	25	+37.471^{2}	11	
13	7	(New Zealand) Marcus Armstrong	Hitech Grand Prix	25	+39.756^{3}	12	
14	15	(Switzerland) Ralph Boschung	Campos Racing	25	+40.683	10	
15	4	(Japan) Marino Sato	Virtuosi Racing	25	+43.718	17	
16	21	(Australia) Calan Williams	Trident	25	+45.683	18	
17	25	(Belgium) Amaury Cordeel	Van Amersfoort Racing	25	+52.243	20	
18	23	(Colombia) Tatiana Calderón	Charouz Racing System	25	+57.384	21	
19	16	(Israel) Roy Nissany	DAMS	25	+1:02.827	15	
20	2	(India) Jehan Daruvala	Prema Racing	25	+1:46.358	9	
21†	14	(Germany) Lirim Zendeli	Campos Racing	22	Mechanical	19	
DNF	10	(France) Théo Pourchaire	ART Grand Prix	3	Gearbox	8	
Fastest lap set by (India) Jehan Daruvala: 2:00.677 (lap 36)

Notes:

- ^1 – Enzo Fittipaldi originally finished fifth, but was later given a five-second time-penalty for leaving the track and gaining an advantage.
- ^2 – Dennis Hauger originally finished eleventh, but received a total penalty of ten seconds due to both forcing another driver off the track and exceeding track limits.
- ^3 – Marcus Armstrong received a five-second time-penalty for forcing another driver off the track.

== Standings after the event ==
Drivers' Championship standings

	Pos.	Driver	Points
	1	(Brazil) Felipe Drugovich	205
	2	(France) Théo Pourchaire	162
	3	(United States) Logan Sargeant	129
5	4	(Australia) Jack Doohan	121
3	5	(New Zealand) Liam Lawson	114

Teams' Championship standings

Pos.	Team	Points
1	(France) ART Grand Prix	253
2	(United Kingdom) Carlin	243
3	(Netherlands) MP Motorsport	233
4	(United Kingdom) Hitech Grand Prix	170
5	(Italy) Prema Racing	161

- Note: Only the top five positions are included for both sets of standings.

== See also ==
- 2022 Belgian Grand Prix
- 2022 Spa-Francorchamps Formula 3 round

Previous round: 2022 Budapest Formula 2 round	FIA Formula 2 Championship; 2022 season	Next round: 2022 Zandvoort Formula 2 round
Previous round: 2020 Spa-Francorchamps Formula 2 round	Spa-Francorchamps Formula 2 round	Next round: 2023 Spa-Francorchamps Formula 2 round
