= 2022 Zandvoort Formula 2 round =

Car racing competition

(Netherlands) 2022 Zandvoort Formula 2 round
Round details
- Round 12 of 14 in the 2022 FIA Formula 2 Championship.
- Layout of the Zandvoort circuit
- Location: Circuit Zandvoort, Zandvoort, Netherlands
- Course: Permanent racing facility 4.259 km (2.646 mi)

Sprint race
- Date: 3 September 2022
- Laps: 29
Podium
First	(New Zealand) Marcus Armstrong	Hitech Grand Prix
Second	(France) Clément Novalak	MP Motorsport
Third	(Norway) Dennis Hauger	Prema Racing
Fastest lap
Driver	(Brazil) Felipe Drugovich	MP Motorsport
- Time: 1:25.808 (on lap 25)

Feature race
- Date: 4 September 2022
- Laps: 38 (Note: The race was scheduled to be run for 40 laps, but was red-flagged after an accident of Logan Sargeant on the opening lap. Thus, the race distance has been shortened to 38 laps.)
Pole position
Driver	(Brazil) Felipe Drugovich	MP Motorsport
Time	1:20.713	
Podium
First	(Brazil) Felipe Drugovich	MP Motorsport
Second	(Netherlands) Richard Verschoor	Trident
Third	(Japan) Ayumu Iwasa	DAMS
Fastest lap
Driver	(Denmark) Frederik Vesti	ART Grand Prix
- Time: 1:23.078 (on lap 31)

The 2022 Zandvoort FIA Formula 2 round was a motor racing event held between 2 and 4 September 2022 at Circuit Zandvoort, Zandvoort, Netherlands. It was the twelfth round of the 2022 Formula 2 Championship and was held in support of the 2022 Dutch Grand Prix.

== Classification ==
=== Qualifying ===
Felipe Drugovich achieved back-to-back pole positions with a lap time over two tenths ahead of Spa-Francorchamps feature race winner Jack Doohan and Logan Sargeant.

Pos.	No.	Driver	Entrant	Time	Grid SR	Grid FR
1	11	(Brazil) Felipe Drugovich	MP Motorsport	1:20.713	10	1
2	3	(Australia) Jack Doohan	Virtuosi Racing	+0.226	9	2
3	6	(United States) Logan Sargeant	Carlin	+0.528	8	3
4	20	(Netherlands) Richard Verschoor	Trident	+0.529	7	4
5	17	(Japan) Ayumu Iwasa	DAMS	+0.530	6	5
6	5	(New Zealand) Liam Lawson	Carlin	+0.568	5	6
7	1	(Norway) Dennis Hauger	Prema Racing	+0.634	4	7
8	8	(Estonia) Jüri Vips	Hitech Grand Prix	+0.730	3	8
9	7	(New Zealand) Marcus Armstrong	Hitech Grand Prix	+0.741	2	9
10	12	(France) Clément Novalak	MP Motorsport	+0.846	1	10
11	9	(Denmark) Frederik Vesti	ART Grand Prix	+0.867	11	11
12	25	(Belgium) Amaury Cordeel	Van Amersfoort Racing	+0.906	12	12
13	22	(Brazil) Enzo Fittipaldi	Charouz Racing System	+1.020	13	13
14	16	(Israel) Roy Nissany	DAMS	+1.025	14	14
15	4	(Japan) Marino Sato	Virtuosi Racing	+1.210	15	15
16	10	(France) Théo Pourchaire	ART Grand Prix	+1.271	16	16
17	2	(India) Jehan Daruvala	Prema Racing	+1.294	17	17
18	24	(Germany) David Beckmann	Van Amersfoort Racing	+1.362	18	18
19	14	(United Kingdom) Olli Caldwell	Campos Racing	+1.371	19	19
20	21	(Australia) Calan Williams	Trident	+1.409	20	20
21	15	(Switzerland) Ralph Boschung	Campos Racing	+1.686	21	21
22	23	(Colombia) Tatiana Calderón	Charouz Racing System	+2.400	22	22

=== Sprint race ===
Pos.	No.	Driver	Entrant	Laps	Time/Retired	Grid	Points
1	7	(New Zealand) Marcus Armstrong	Hitech Grand Prix	29	43:42.549	2	10
2	12	(France) Clément Novalak	MP Motorsport	29	+0.880	1	8
3	1	(Norway) Dennis Hauger	Prema Racing	29	+1.990	4	6
4	5	(New Zealand) Liam Lawson	Carlin	29	+2.517	5	5
5	8	(Estonia) Jüri Vips	Hitech Grand Prix	29	+3.026	3	4
6	17	(Japan) Ayumu Iwasa	DAMS	29	+3.318	6	3
7	20	(Netherlands) Richard Verschoor	Trident	29	+4.268	7	2
8	6	(United States) Logan Sargeant	Carlin	29	+4.650	8	1
9	3	(Australia) Jack Doohan	Virtuosi Racing	29	+4.840	9	
10	11	(Brazil) Felipe Drugovich	MP Motorsport	29	+5.458	10	(1)
11	9	(Denmark) Frederik Vesti	ART Grand Prix	29	+6.287	11	
12	25	(Belgium) Amaury Cordeel	Van Amersfoort Racing	29	+6.719	12	
13	22	(Brazil) Enzo Fittipaldi	Charouz Racing System	29	+7.416	13	
14	24	(Germany) David Beckmann	Van Amersfoort Racing	29	+8.103	18	
15	16	(Israel) Roy Nissany	DAMS	29	+8.940	14	
16	2	(India) Jehan Daruvala	Prema Racing	29	+9.719	17	
17	15	(Switzerland) Ralph Boschung	Campos Racing	29	+9.818	21	
18	21	(Australia) Calan Williams	Trident	29	+10.445	20	
19	4	(Japan) Marino Sato	Virtuosi Racing	29	+11.288	15	
20	10	(France) Théo Pourchaire	ART Grand Prix	29	+11.470	16	
DNF	23	(Colombia) Tatiana Calderón	Charouz Racing System	25	Spun off	22	
DNF	14	(United Kingdom) Olli Caldwell	Campos Racing	11	Damage	19	
Fastest lap set by (Brazil) Felipe Drugovich: 1:25.808 (lap 25)

=== Feature race ===
The race was red-flagged after Logan Sargeant's opening-lap crash damaged the barriers. The race was restarted after twenty-five minutes.

Pos.	No.	Driver	Entrant	Laps	Time/Retired	Grid	Points
1	11	(Brazil) Felipe Drugovich	MP Motorsport	38	1:25:22.484	1	25 (2)
2	20	(Netherlands) Richard Verschoor	Trident	38	+2.405	4	18
3	17	(Japan) Ayumu Iwasa	DAMS	38	+3.645	5	15
4	1	(Norway) Dennis Hauger	Prema Racing	38	+6.947	7	12
5	22	(Brazil) Enzo Fittipaldi	Charouz Racing System	38	+7.987	13	10
6	25	(Belgium) Amaury Cordeel	Van Amersfoort Racing	38	+10.872	12	8
7	8	(Estonia) Jüri Vips	Hitech Grand Prix	38	+12.400	8	6
8	14	(United Kingdom) Olli Caldwell	Campos Racing	38	+14.609	19	4
9	10	(France) Théo Pourchaire	ART Grand Prix	38	+15.562	16	2
10	2	(India) Jehan Daruvala	Prema Racing	38	+17.281	17	1
11	21	(Australia) Calan Williams	Trident	38	+18.499	20	
12	5	(New Zealand) Liam Lawson	Carlin	38	+20.264	6	
13	24	(Germany) David Beckmann	Van Amersfoort Racing	38	+23.169^{1}	18	
14	7	(New Zealand) Marcus Armstrong	Hitech Grand Prix	38	+25.601	9	
15	9	(Denmark) Frederik Vesti	ART Grand Prix	38	+29.385	11	
16	16	(Israel) Roy Nissany	DAMS	38	+37.144^{1}	15	
17	15	(Switzerland) Ralph Boschung	Campos Racing	38	+50.639	21	
DNF	23	(Colombia) Tatiana Calderón	Charouz Racing System	23	Collision damage	22	
DNF	12	(France) Clément Novalak	MP Motorsport	23	Collision damage	10	
DNF	3	(Australia) Jack Doohan	Virtuosi Racing	22	Collision	2	
DNF	4	(Japan) Marino Sato	Virtuosi Racing	18	Wheel nut	15	
DNF	6	(United States) Logan Sargeant	Carlin	0	Crash	3	
Fastest lap set by (Denmark) Frederik Vesti: 1:23.078 (lap 31)

Notes:

- ^1 – David Beckmann and Roy Nissany both received ten-second time penalties for driving erratically under safety car conditions.

== Standings after the event ==
Drivers' Championship standings

Pos.	Driver	Points
1	(Brazil) Felipe Drugovich	233
2	(France) Théo Pourchaire	164
3	(United States) Logan Sargeant	130
4	(Australia) Jack Doohan	121
5	(New Zealand) Liam Lawson	119

Teams' Championship standings

	Pos.	Team	Points
2	1	(Netherlands) MP Motorsport	269
1	2	(France) ART Grand Prix	255
1	3	(United Kingdom) Carlin	249
	4	(United Kingdom) Hitech Grand Prix	190
	5	(Italy) Prema Racing	180

- Note: Only the top five positions are included for both sets of standings.

== See also ==
- 2022 Dutch Grand Prix
- 2022 Zandvoort Formula 3 round

== Notes ==
Previous round: 2022 Spa-Francorchamps Formula 2 round	FIA Formula 2 Championship; 2022 season	Next round: 2022 Monza Formula 2 round
Previous round: 1985 European Formula 3000 Zandvoort round	Zandvoort Formula 2 round	Next round: 2023 Zandvoort Formula 2 round
