= David Beckmann =

German racing driver (born 2000)

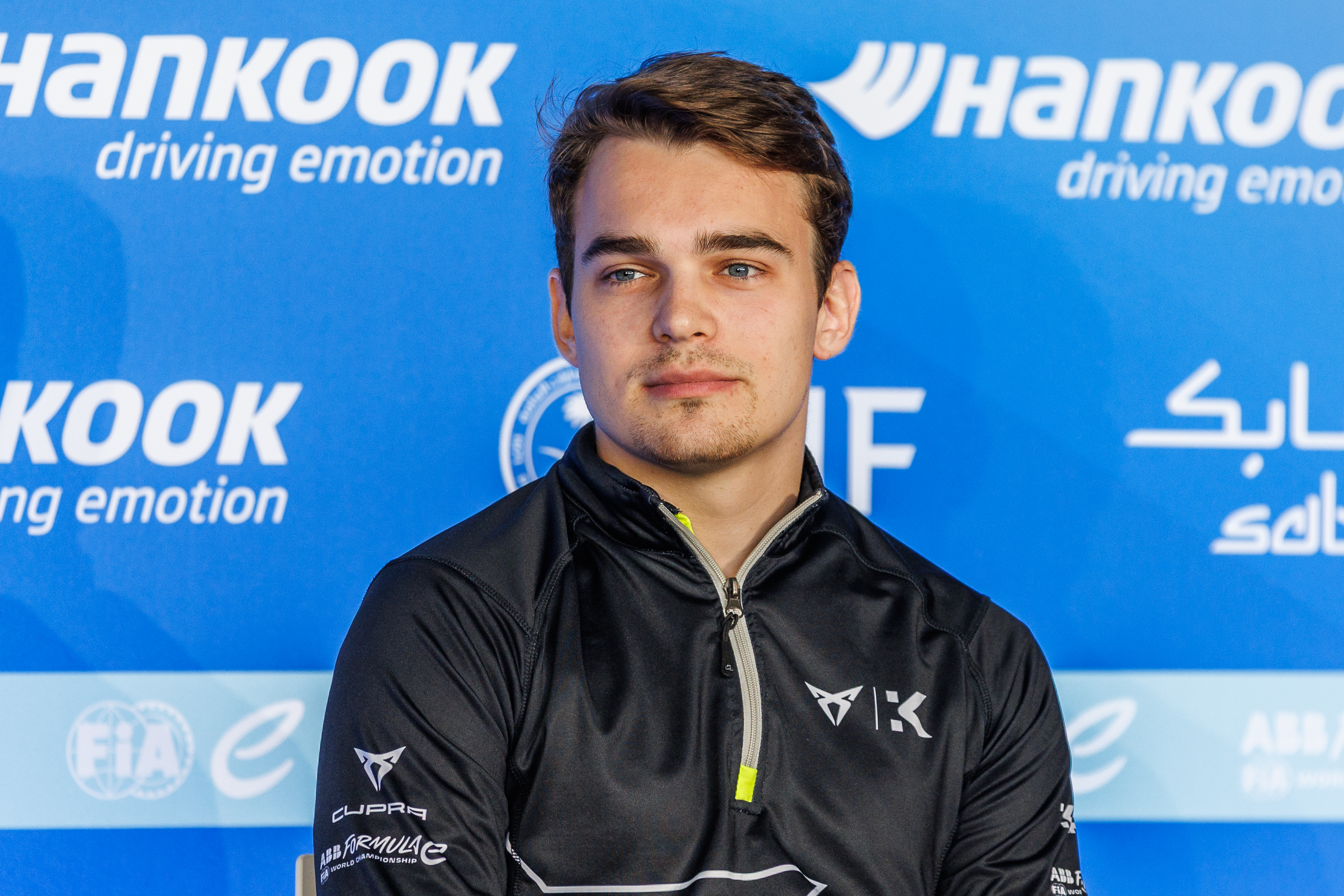
- Beckmann in 2025
- Nationality: (Germany) German
- Born: 27 April 2000 (age 26) Iserlohn, Germany

Formula E career
- Debut season: 2022–23
- Categorisation: FIA Silver (until 2023); FIA Gold (2024–)
- Car number: 3
- Former teams: Avalanche Andretti Formula E, Cupra Kiro
- Starts: 18 (18 entries)
- Wins: 0
- Podiums: 0
- Poles: 0
- Fastest laps: 1
- Best finish: 23rd in 2024–25

Previous series
- 2021–22 2019–20 2018 2016–17 2015 2015: FIA Formula 2 Championship; FIA Formula 3 Championship; GP3 Series; FIA Formula 3 European; ADAC Formula 4 Italian F4 Championship

David Alexander Beckmann (born 27 April 2000) is a German professional racing driver who most recently competed in Cupra Kiro in Formula E. He previously competed in the FIA Formula 2 Championship for Charouz Racing System, Campos Racing, and Van Amersfoort Racing.

== Junior racing career ==
=== Karting ===
Beckmann began karting in 2008, collecting major karting wins in 2009, 2012, and 2014. He remained in karting until 2014.

=== Formula 4 ===
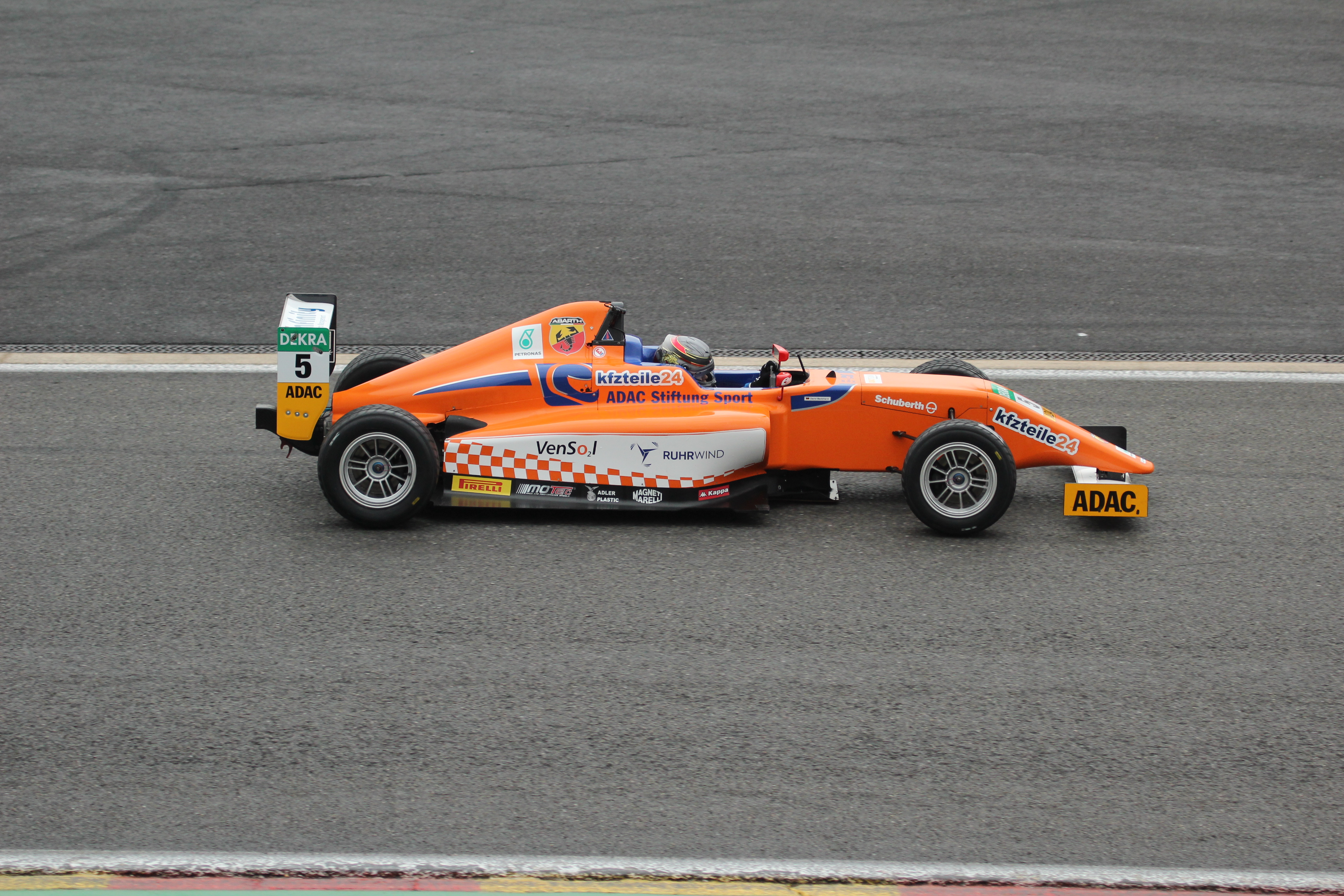
Beckmann at the 2015 ADAC Formula 4 Championship

In 2015, Beckmann graduated to single-seaters in ADAC Formula 4 and Italian F4, racing with Mücke Motorsport. He ended the season fourth in Italian F4 and fifth in ADAC Formula 4, taking the latter rookie's championship.

=== FIA European Formula 3 Championship ===
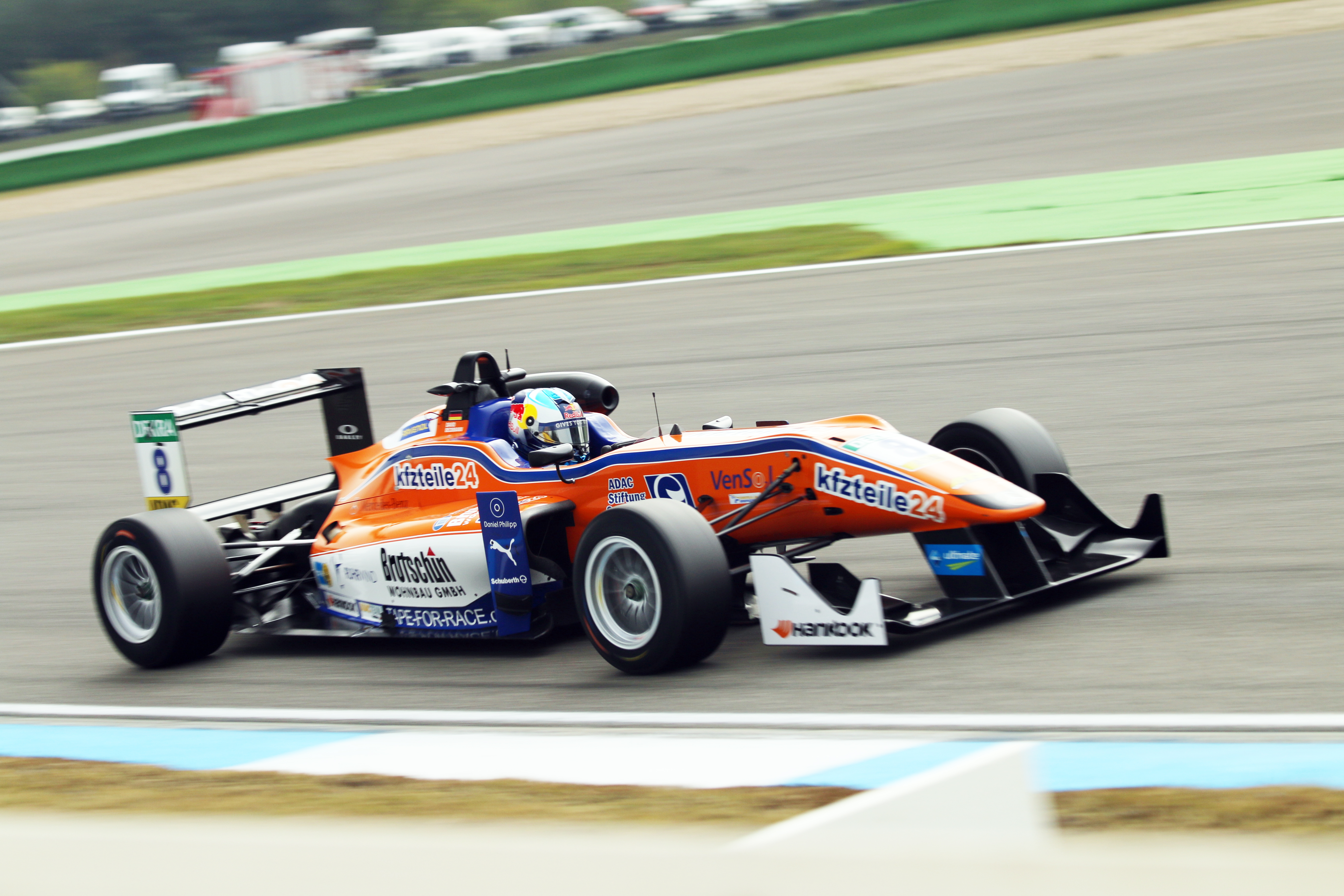
Beckmann at the 2016 FIA Formula 3 European Championship

In December 2015, Beckmann was announced to graduate to European Formula 3 for 2016, whilst continuing his collaboration with Mücke. Because of his age, Beckmann was forced to miss the season's first two rounds, making his debut at the third round at Pau. Nonetheless, Beckmann claimed a fastest lap and two podiums to finish seventh in the Rookie Championship and fifteenth overall. For 2017, Beckmann continued to race in European Formula 3, but switched to Van Amersfoort Racing. After three rounds where he failed to score a point with the outfit, Beckmann made a mid-season change to Motopark, where he fared better, amassing 45 points and ending up 16th in his second year in the category.

=== GP3 Series ===
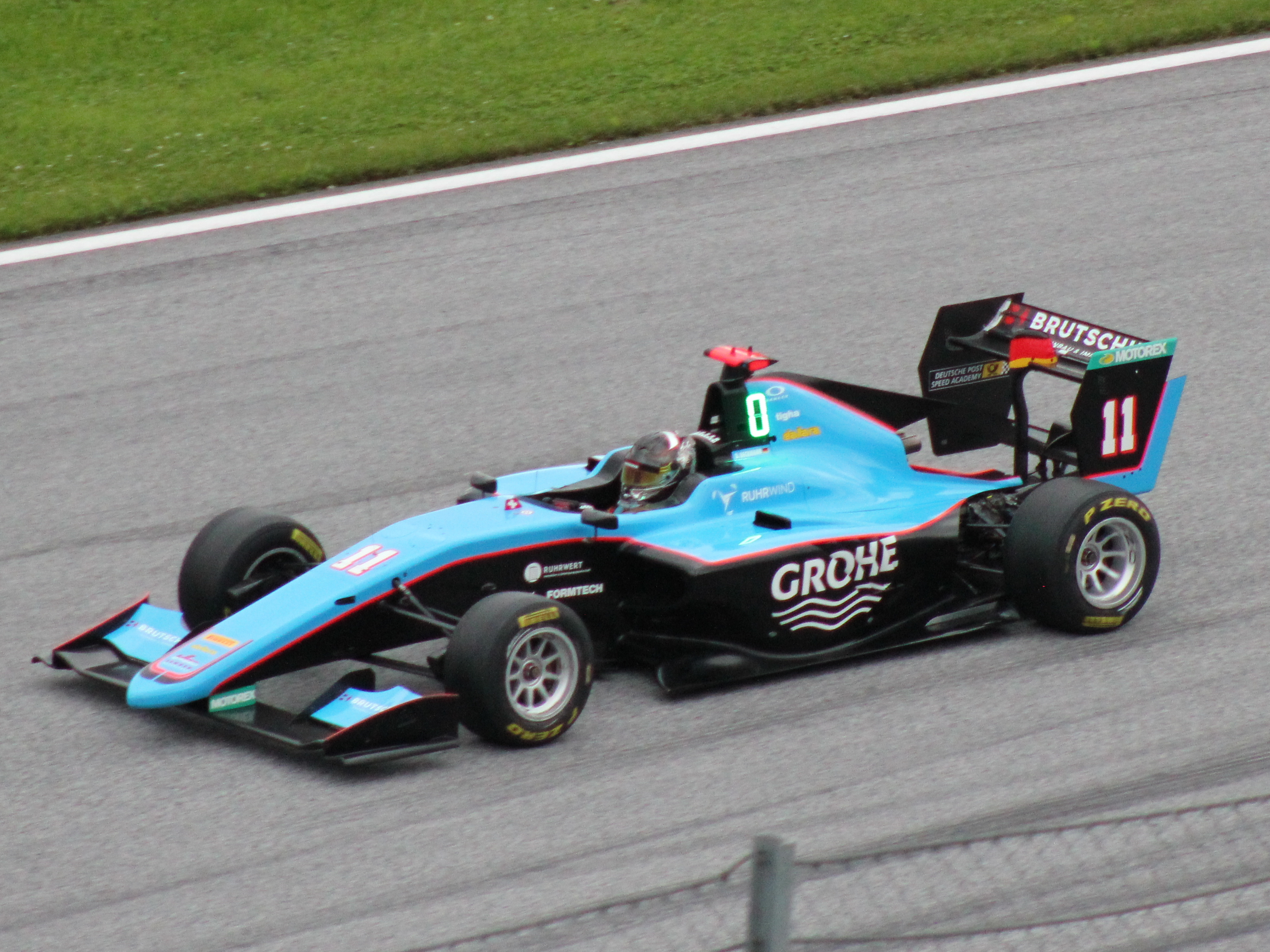
Beckmann with Jenzer Motorsport in 2018

For 2018, Beckmann partnered with Juan Manuel Correa and Tatiana Calderón at Jenzer Motorsport in the final year of the GP3 Series. Having scored twelve points after the fourth round of the championship, Beckmann switched to Trident. His results improved drastically, and the German achieved three race wins and another podium, leading him to fifth in the standings.

=== FIA Formula 3 Championship ===
==== 2019 ====
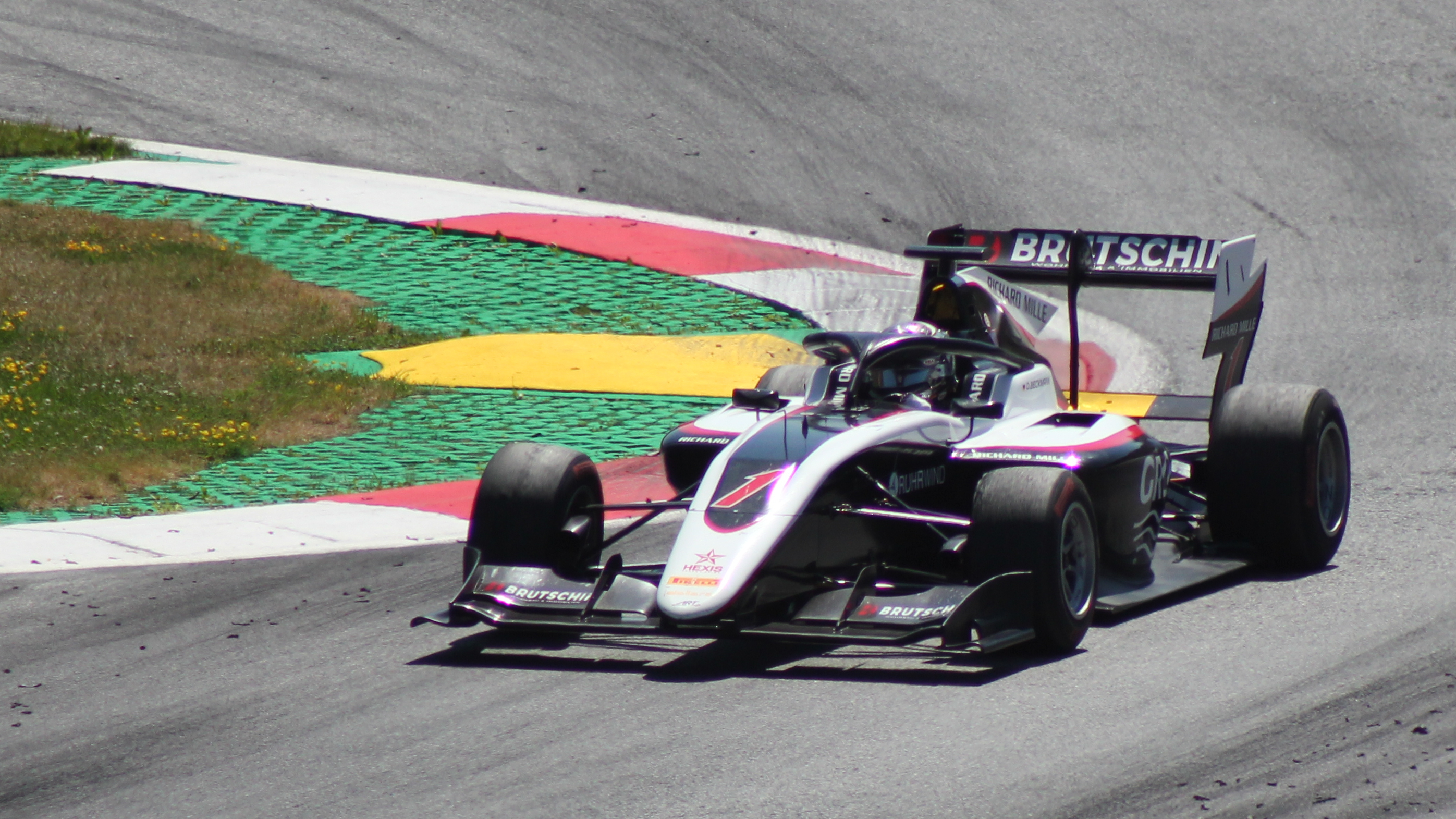
Beckmann with ART Grand Prix in 2019

In 2019, Beckmann competed for the French team ART Grand Prix in the newly formed FIA Formula 3 Championship.

==== 2020 ====
In 2020, Beckmann returned to Formula 3, this time with Trident, and finished sixth overall after two wins and four further podium finishes.

=== FIA Formula 2 Championship ===
==== 2021 ====
In 2021, Beckmann moved up to the FIA Formula 2 Championship with the Czech team Charouz Racing System, where was joined by Guilherme Samaia. Throughout the first half of the season, Beckmann showed impressive performances, such as a third-place finish in his debut race at Sakhir and second place in race 2 in Baku, which, along with two further points finishes, propelled him to 13th in the standings after four rounds. At the start of September however, it was announced Enzo Fittipaldi would replace Beckmann from the next round at Monza, due to the German having to shift his focus to the family business for financial issues. But just a few days before the start of that weekend, Beckmann signed up to race for Campos in place of Matteo Nannini. He competed for the Spanish team in the next two rounds, scoring a best finish of fifth at Monza, although Beckmann would ultimately be unable to finish his season, being replaced by Olli Caldwell. The German ended the campaign 15th in the standings.

==== 2022 ====
Beckmann driving the Dallara F2 2018 during the 2022 Le Castellet Formula 2 round.

In 2022, Beckmann originally made four cameo appearances, but was later announced as a permanent driver. The first of which he drove for Charouz's No. 23 car at Imola in place of Cem Bölükbaşı, finishing 8th in the feature race. He then drove for Van Amersfoort Racing's No. 25 car at Silverstone in place of Amaury Cordeel. He would then compete again for the same team, but in the No. 24, at Le Castellet and Budapest in place of Jake Hughes. However, Van Amersfoort Racing decided to replace Hughes with Beckmann for the rest of the season, starting at Spa-Francorchamps, thus his cameo deputization driver role would become a permanent driver role until the final round at Abu Dhabi, where Juan Manuel Correa would replace him.

== Formula E ==
In February 2022, on the week of the Mexico City ePrix, Beckmann was announced to be the test and reserve driver of the Avalanche Andretti Formula E team.

For the 2022-23 season, Beckmann continued his duties with Andretti, whilst also joining Porsche as a reserve driver.

=== Avalanche Andretti Formula E (2023) ===
==== 2022–23 season ====
Beckmann made his Formula E debut with Avalanche Andretti for the Jakarta ePrix double-header, deputising for André Lotterer as he prepared for the 24 Hours of Le Mans.

=== Porsche reserve driver (2024) ===
Beckmann continued as the reserve driver for Porsche for the 2023–24 season.

=== Kiro Race Co (2024–2025) ===
==== 2024–25 season ====
Beckmann joined Cupra Kiro for the 2024–25 season alongside Dan Ticktum, in what is to be his first full Formula E campaign. After a difficult campaign which saw him only score a single point, he parted ways with the team at the end of the season.

=== Reserve driver roles (2025–) ===
Beckmann's involvement in Formula E continued despite leaving the grid full-time, as he would serve as a reserve driver for Porsche and Cupra Kiro.

== Karting record ==
=== Karting career summary ===
Season	Series	Team	Position
2008	ADAC Kart Masters — Bambini B		3rd
2009	DMV Landesmeisterschaft — Bambini B	TR Racing	1st
2009	ADAC Kart Bundesendlauf — Bambini B		11th
2009	ADAC Kart Masters — Bambini B	Hagen	1st
2010	ADAC Kart Masters — Bambini A	Hagen	13th
2011	Euro Wintercup — KF3		4th
2011	Belgian Championship — KF5		3rd
2011	SKUSA SuperNationals — TaG Junior		19th
2012	Euro Wintercup — KF3		6th
2012	Bridgestone Cup Europe — KF3	Keijzer Racing	1st
2012	ADAC Kart Masters — KF3	Keijzer Racing	10th
2012	DMV Kart Championship — KF3	Keijzer Racing	1st
2013	South Garda Winter Cup — KF3		4th
2013	German Karting Championship — Junior	Reenergys Racing Team	2nd
2013	CIK-FIA International Super Cup — KFJ		23rd
2013	WSK Super Master Series — KFJ	Keijzer Racing	27th
2013	WSK Final Cup — KFJ	Keijzer Racing	14th
2013	WSK Euro Series — KFJ	Zanardi	3rd
2013	CIK-FIA European Championship — KFJ	Zanardi	43rd
2013	CIK-FIA World Championship — KFJ	Zanardi	25th
2014	South Garda Winter Cup — KF3		10th
2014	German Karting Championship — Junior		1st
2014	WSK Super Master Series — KFJ	Energy Corse Srl	12th
2014	CIK-FIA European Championship — KFJ	Beckmann, Robin	5th
2014	CIK-FIA World Championship — KFJ	Beckmann, Robin	28th
2014	WSK Champions Cup — KFJ	Ricky Flynn Motorsport	11th

== Racing record ==
=== Racing career summary ===
Season	Series	Team	Races	Wins	Poles	F/Laps	Podiums	Points	Position
2015	ADAC Formula 4 Championship	ADAC Berlin-Brandenburg e.V.	21	1	0	0	4	166	5th
2015	Italian F4 Championship	kfzteile24 Mücke Motorsport	18	3	1	4	7	176	4th
2016	FIA Formula 3 European Championship	kfzteile24 Mücke Motorsport	24	0	0	1	2	67	15th
2016	Masters of Formula 3	kfzteile24 Mücke Motorsport	1	0	0	0	0	N/A	10th
2016	Macau Grand Prix	kfzteile24 Mücke Motorsport	1	0	0	0	0	N/A	19th
2017	FIA Formula 3 European Championship	Van Amersfoort Racing	9	0	0	0	0	45	16th
2017	FIA Formula 3 European Championship	Motopark	21	0	0	0	0	45	16th
2018	GP3 Series	Jenzer Motorsport	8	0	0	0	0	137	5th
2018	GP3 Series	Trident	10	3	2	2	4	137	5th
2019	FIA Formula 3 Championship	ART Grand Prix	14	0	0	0	0	20	14th
2019	Macau Grand Prix	Trident	1	0	0	0	0	N/A	9th
2020	FIA Formula 3 Championship	Trident	18	2	0	0	5	139.5	6th
2020	Porsche Sprint Challenge Middle East	Lechner Racing Middle East	6	1	0	1	1	97	13th
2021	FIA Formula 2 Championship	Charouz Racing System	12	0	0	0	2	32	15th
2021	FIA Formula 2 Championship	Campos Racing	5	0	0	0	0	32	15th
2021–22	Formula E	Avalanche Andretti Formula E	Test/Reserve driver						
2022	FIA Formula 2 Championship	Charouz Racing System	2	0	0	0	0	25	18th
2022	FIA Formula 2 Championship	Van Amersfoort Racing	12	0	0	1	0	25	18th
2022–23	Formula E	Avalanche Andretti Formula E	2	0	0	0	0	0	25th
2022–23	Formula E	TAG Heuer Porsche Formula E Team	Reserve driver						
2023	FIA World Endurance Championship - LMP2	Hertz Team Jota	2	1	0	0	1	N/A	NC†
2023–24	Formula E	TAG Heuer Porsche Formula E Team	Reserve driver						
2024	24 Hours of Nürburgring - Cup2	Huber Motorsport	1	0	0	0	0	N/A	6th
2024–25	Formula E	Cupra Kiro	16	0	0	1	0	1	23rd
2025–26	Formula E	TAG Heuer Porsche Formula E Team	Reserve driver						
2025–26	Formula E	Cupra Kiro	Reserve driver						

^{*} Season still in progress.

=== Complete Italian F4 Championship results ===
(key) (Races in bold indicate pole position) (Races in italics indicate fastest lap)

Year	Team	1	2	3	4	5	6	7	8	9	10	11	12	13	14	15	16	17	18	19	20	21	DC	Points
2015	kfzteile24 Mücke Motorsport	VLL; 1; 10	VLL; 2; 1	VLL; 3; 5	MNZ; 1; 4	MNZ; 2; 2	MNZ; 3 Ret	IMO1; 1; 8	IMO1; 2; 1	IMO1; 3; 9	MUG; 1; 3	MUG; 2; 15	MUG; 3; 2	**ADR**; **1**; 1	ADR; 2; 4	ADR; 3; 5	IMO2; 1; 4	IMO2; 2; 17	IMO2; 3; 3	MIS; 1	MIS; 2	MIS; 3	4th	176

=== Complete ADAC Formula 4 Championship results ===
(key) (Races in bold indicate pole position) (Races in italics indicate fastest lap)

Year	Team	1	2	3	4	5	6	7	8	9	10	11	12	13	14	15	16	17	18	19	20	21	22	23	24	DC	Points
2015	ADAC Berlin-Brandenburg e.V.	OSC1; 1	OSC1; 2	OSC1; 3	RBR; 1; 7	RBR; 2 Ret	RBR; 3; 3	SPA; 1; 7	SPA; 2; 11	SPA; 3; 7	LAU; 1; 5	LAU; 2 Ret	LAU; 3; 18	NÜR; 1; 5	NÜR; 2; 4	NÜR; 3; 8	SAC; 1; 7	SAC; 2; 5	SAC; 3; 5	OSC2; 1; 15	OSC2; 2; 5	OSC2; 3; 11	HOC; 1; 2	HOC; 2; 1	HOC; 3; 2	5th	166

=== Complete FIA Formula 3 European Championship results ===
(key) (Races in bold indicate pole position) (Races in italics indicate fastest lap)

Year	Entrant	Engine	1	2	3	4	5	6	7	8	9	10	11	12	13	14	15	16	17	18	19	20	21	22	23	24	25	26	27	28	29	30	DC	Points
2016	kfzteile24 Mücke Motorsport	Mercedes	LEC; 1	LEC; 2	LEC; 3	HUN; 1	HUN; 2	HUN; 3	PAU; 1; 17	PAU; 2 Ret	PAU; 3 Ret	RBR; 1; 7	RBR; 2; 7	RBR; 3; 12	NOR; 1; 10	NOR; 2; 13	NOR; 3 Ret	ZAN; 1; 10	ZAN; 2; 7	ZAN; 3; 3	SPA; 1; 7	SPA; 2; 16	SPA; 3; 10	NÜR; 1; 13	NÜR; 2; 6	NÜR; 3; 13	IMO; 1 Ret	IMO; 2 Ret	IMO; 3; 5	HOC; 1; 12	HOC; 2; 3	HOC; 3; 18	15th	67
2017	Van Amersfoort Racing	Mercedes	SIL; 1; 14	SIL; 2; 17	SIL; 3; 14	MNZ; 1 Ret	MNZ; 2; 15	MNZ; 3; 14	PAU; 1; 11	PAU; 2; 14	PAU; 3 Ret																						16th	45
2017	Motopark	Volkswagen										HUN; 1; 11	HUN; 2; 5	HUN; 3; 5	NOR; 1; 12	NOR; 2; 11	NOR; 3; 6	SPA; 1 Ret	SPA; 2; 15	SPA; 3; 16	ZAN; 1 Ret	ZAN; 2; 5	ZAN; 3; 13	NÜR; 1 Ret	NÜR; 2; 16	NÜR; 3; 15	RBR; 1; 8	RBR; 2; 11	RBR; 3; 9	HOC; 1; 17	HOC; 2; 13	HOC; 3; 10	16th	45

=== Complete Macau Grand Prix results ===
Year	Team	Car	Qualifying	Quali Race	Main race
2016	(Germany) kfzteile24 Mücke Motorsport	Dallara F312	15th	13th	19th
2019	(Italy) Trident	Dallara F3 2019	19th	9th	9th

=== Complete GP3 Series/FIA Formula 3 Championship results ===
(key) (Races in bold indicate pole position) (Races in italics indicate fastest lap)

Year	Entrant	1	2	3	4	5	6	7	8	9	10	11	12	13	14	15	16	17	18	Pos	Points
2018	Jenzer Motorsport	CAT; FEA; 6	CAT; SPR; 17	LEC; FEA; 18	LEC; SPR; 10	RBR; FEA; 8	RBR; SPR; Ret	SIL; FEA; 14	SIL; SPR; Ret											5th	137
2018	Trident									HUN; FEA; 4	HUN; SPR; 7	**SPA**; **FEA**; 1	SPA; SPR; Ret	**MNZ**; **FEA**; 1	MNZ; SPR; 5	SOC; FEA; 5	SOC; SPR; 1	YMC; FEA; 2	YMC; SPR; Ret	5th	137
2019	ART Grand Prix	CAT; FEA; 4	CAT; SPR; 7	LEC; FEA; 10	LEC; SPR; Ret	RBR; FEA; 15	RBR; SPR; 10	SIL; FEA; 11	SIL; SPR; 6	HUN; FEA; 28†	HUN; SPR; 19	SPA; FEA; 10	SPA; SPR; 12	MNZ; FEA; Ret	MNZ; SPR; 28†	SOC; FEA; WD	SOC; SPR; WD			14th	20
2020	Trident	RBR; FEA; 7	RBR; SPR; 4	RBR; FEA; 3‡	RBR; SPR; 3	HUN; FEA; 10	HUN; SPR; 1	SIL; FEA; 9	SIL; SPR; 1	SIL; FEA; 5	SIL; SPR; 4	CAT; FEA; 5	CAT; SPR; 9	SPA; FEA; 3	SPA; SPR; 9	MNZ; FEA; 4	MNZ; SPR; Ret	MUG; FEA; 8	MUG; SPR; 2	6th	139.5

^{†} Driver did not finish the race, but was classified as he completed over 90% of the race distance.
^{‡} Half points awarded as less than 75% of race distance was completed.

=== Complete FIA Formula 2 Championship results ===
(key) (Races in bold indicate pole position) (Races in italics indicate fastest lap)

Year	Entrant	1	2	3	4	5	6	7	8	9	10	11	12	13	14	15	16	17	18	19	20	21	22	23	24	25	26	27	28	DC	Points
2021	Charouz Racing System	BHR; SP1; 3	BHR; SP2; 7	BHR; FEA; 11	MCO; SP1; 12	MCO; SP2; Ret	MCO; FEA; 13	BAK; SP1; 9	BAK; SP2; 2	BAK; FEA; 12	SIL; SP1; 13	SIL; SP2; 8	SIL; FEA; 15																	15th	32
2021	Campos Racing													MNZ; SP1; 10	MNZ; SP2; 5	MNZ; FEA; 16†	SOC; SP1; 15	SOC; SP2; C	SOC; FEA; 10	JED; SP1	JED; SP2	JED; FEA	YMC; SP1	YMC; SP2	YMC; FEA					15th	32
2022	Charouz Racing System	BHR; SPR	BHR; FEA	JED; SPR	JED; FEA	IMO; SPR; Ret	IMO; FEA; 8	CAT; SPR	CAT; FEA	MCO; SPR	MCO; FEA	BAK; SPR	BAK; FEA																	18th	25
2022	Van Amersfoort Racing													SIL; SPR; 16	SIL; FEA; 19	RBR; SPR	RBR; FEA	LEC; SPR; 10	LEC; FEA; 14	HUN; SPR; 12	HUN; FEA; 14	SPA; SPR; 8	SPA; FEA; 6	ZAN; SPR; 14	ZAN; FEA; 13	MNZ; SPR; 7	MNZ; FEA; 5	YMC; SPR	YMC; FEA	18th	25

=== Complete Formula E results ===
(key) (Races in bold indicate pole position; races in italics indicate fastest lap)

Year	Team	Chassis	Powertrain	1	2	3	4	5	6	7	8	9	10	11	12	13	14	15	16	Pos	Points
2022–23	Avalanche Andretti Formula E	Formula E Gen3	Porsche 99X Electric	MEX	DRH	DRH	HYD	CAP	SAP	BER	BER	MCO	JAK; 16	JAK; Ret	POR	RME	RME	LDN	LDN	25th	0
2024–25	Kiro Race Co	Formula E Gen3 Evo	Porsche 99X Electric WCG3	SAO; NC	MEX; Ret	JED; 14	JED; 17	MIA; NC	MCO; 15	MCO; 19	TKO; 18	TKO; 13	SHA; 14	SHA; 20	JKT; 16	BER; Ret	BER; 16	LDN; 12	LDN; 10	23rd	1

^{*} Season still in progress.
