= 2022 Monza Formula 2 round =

Motor racing event

(Italy) 2022 Monza Formula 2 round
Round details
- Round 13 of 14 in the 2022 FIA Formula 2 Championship.
- Location: Autodromo Nazionale di Monza, Monza, Italy
- Course: Permanent Circuit; 5.793 km (3.600 mi)

Sprint race
- Date: 10 September 2022
- Laps: 21
Podium
First	(Estonia) Jüri Vips	Hitech Grand Prix
Second	(Denmark) Frederik Vesti	ART Grand Prix
Third	(India) Jehan Daruvala	Prema Racing
Fastest lap
Driver	(Norway) Dennis Hauger	Prema Racing
- Time: 1:33.739 (on lap 20)

Feature race
- Date: 11 September 2022
- Laps: 30
Pole position
Driver	(Australia) Jack Doohan	Virtuosi Racing
Time	1:31.641	
Podium
First	(India) Jehan Daruvala	Prema Racing
Second	(Denmark) Frederik Vesti	ART Grand Prix
Third	(Brazil) Enzo Fittipaldi	Charouz Racing System
Fastest lap
Driver	(Netherlands) Richard Verschoor	Trident
- Time: 1:33.155 (on lap 29)

The 2022 Monza FIA Formula 2 round was a motor racing event held between 9 and 11 September 2022 at the Autodromo Nazionale di Monza, Monza, Italy. It was the penultimate race of the 2022 Formula 2 Championship and was held in support of the 2022 Italian Grand Prix.

Despite retiring in the sprint race, Felipe Drugovich became the 2022 FIA Formula 2 Drivers' Champion with three races to spare. His nearest championship rival, Théo Pourchaire, finished in seventeenth and therefore failed to score the required four points in order to remain in mathematical contention for the title. Drugovich's championship victory was the first for an MP Motorsport driver in Formula 2.

== Driver changes ==
Luca Ghiotto replaced Roy Nissany at DAMS, due to the Israeli driver receiving a race ban after exceeding the annual limit of twelve penalty points on his race licence following the Zandvoort round. Nissany became the third driver after Amaury Cordeel and Olli Caldwell to receive a ban during this season.

== Classification ==
=== Qualifying ===
Jack Doohan took his third pole position of his career by nearly two tenths, ahead of both Kiwi drivers Liam Lawson and Marcus Armstrong.

Pos.	No.	Driver	Entrant	Time	Grid SR	Grid FR
1	3	(Australia) Jack Doohan	Virtuosi Racing	1:31.641	9	1
2	5	(New Zealand) Liam Lawson	Carlin	+0.126	8	2
3	7	(New Zealand) Marcus Armstrong	Hitech Grand Prix	+0.193	7	3
4	11	(Brazil) Felipe Drugovich	MP Motorsport	+0.204	12^{1}	4
5	20	(Netherlands) Richard Verschoor	Trident	+0.218	6	5
6	2	(India) Jehan Daruvala	Prema Racing	+0.241	5	6
7	17	(Japan) Ayumu Iwasa	DAMS	+0.279	4	7
8	8	(Estonia) Jüri Vips	Hitech Grand Prix	+0.328	3	8
9	6	(United States) Logan Sargeant	Carlin	+0.382	2	9
10	9	(Denmark) Frederik Vesti	ART Grand Prix	+0.386	1	10
11	24	(Germany) David Beckmann	Van Amersfoort Racing	+0.551	10	11
12	25	(Belgium) Amaury Cordeel	Van Amersfoort Racing	+0.707	11	12
13	15	(Switzerland) Ralph Boschung	Campos Racing	+0.711	13	13
14	10	(France) Théo Pourchaire	ART Grand Prix	+0.783	14	14
15	4	(Japan) Marino Sato	Virtuosi Racing	+0.811	15	15
16	22	(Brazil) Enzo Fittipaldi	Charouz Racing System	+0.814	16	16
17	21	(Australia) Calan Williams	Trident	+1.011	17	17
18	16	(Italy) Luca Ghiotto	DAMS	+1.213	18	18
19	1	(Norway) Dennis Hauger	Prema Racing	+1.272	19	19
20	14	(United Kingdom) Olli Caldwell	Campos Racing	+1.554	20	20
21	12	(France) Clément Novalak	MP Motorsport	+1.704	21	21
22	23	(Colombia) Tatiana Calderón	Charouz Racing System	+1.984	22	22

Notes:

- ^1 – Felipe Drugovich was handed a five-place grid penalty for the sprint race after he was found to have set his fastest lap of the session under single yellow flag conditions at Turn 11.

=== Sprint race ===
Pos.	No.	Driver	Entrant	Laps	Time/Retired	Grid	Points
1	8	(Estonia) Jüri Vips	Hitech Grand Prix	21	35:29.646	3	10
2	9	(Denmark) Frederik Vesti	ART Grand Prix	21	+1.035	1	8
3	2	(India) Jehan Daruvala	Prema Racing	21	+7.684	5	6
4	6	(United States) Logan Sargeant	Carlin	21	+9.022	2	5
5	5	(New Zealand) Liam Lawson	Carlin	21	+13.129	8	4
6	3	(Australia) Jack Doohan	Virtuosi Racing	21	+13.306	9	3
7	24	(Germany) David Beckmann	Van Amersfoort Racing	21	+14.391	10	2
8	20	(Netherlands) Richard Verschoor	Trident	21	+14.462^{1}	6	1
9	1	(Norway) Dennis Hauger	Prema Racing	21	+14.723	19	(1)
10	7	(New Zealand) Marcus Armstrong	Hitech Grand Prix	21	+17.621^{2}	7	
11	4	(Japan) Marino Sato	Virtuosi Racing	21	+19.195	15	
12	22	(Brazil) Enzo Fittipaldi	Charouz Racing System	21	+22.604	16	
13	16	(Italy) Luca Ghiotto	DAMS	21	+24.186	18	
14	21	(Australia) Calan Williams	Trident	21	+24.687	17	
15	25	(Belgium) Amaury Cordeel	Van Amersfoort Racing	21	+25.907	11	
16	17	(Japan) Ayumu Iwasa	DAMS	21	+28.155^{3}	4	
17	10	(France) Théo Pourchaire	ART Grand Prix	21	+30.385^{4}	14	
DNF	15	(Switzerland) Ralph Boschung	Campos Racing	7	Collision damage	13	
DNF	12	(France) Clément Novalak	MP Motorsport	7	Collision damage	21	
DNF	11	(Brazil) Felipe Drugovich	MP Motorsport	1	Suspension	12	
DNF	14	(United Kingdom) Olli Caldwell	Campos Racing	0	Collision	20	
DNF	23	(Colombia) Tatiana Calderón	Charouz Racing System	0	Collision	22	
Fastest lap set by (Norway) Dennis Hauger: 1:33.739 (lap 20)

Notes:

- ^1 – Richard Verschoor originally finished fifth, but was given a five-second time penalty for leaving the track and gaining an advantage.
- ^2 – Marcus Armstrong originally finished sixth, but was given a five-second time penalty for leaving the track and gaining an advantage.
- ^3 – Ayumu Iwasa was given a five-second time penalty for leaving the track and gaining an advantage.
- ^4 – Théo Pourchaire originally finished sixth, but was given a five-second time penalty for causing a collision with Liam Lawson.

=== Feature race ===
Pos.	No.	Driver	Entrant	Laps	Time/Retired	Grid	Points
1	2	(India) Jehan Daruvala	Prema Racing	30	1:06:39.193	6	25
2	9	(Denmark) Frederik Vesti	ART Grand Prix	30	+1.970	10	18
3	22	(Brazil) Enzo Fittipaldi	Charouz Racing System	30	+6.491	15	15
4	1	(Norway) Dennis Hauger	Prema Racing	30	+7.249	19	12
5	24	(Germany) David Beckmann	Van Amersfoort Racing	30	+7.801	11	10
6	11	(Brazil) Felipe Drugovich	MP Motorsport	30	+10.502	4	8
7	25	(Belgium) Amaury Cordeel	Van Amersfoort Racing	30	+12.738	12	6
8	12	(France) Clément Novalak	MP Motorsport	30	+27.950	21	4
9	20	(Netherlands) Richard Verschoor	Trident	30	+35.184	5	2 (1)
10	8	(Estonia) Jüri Vips	Hitech Grand Prix	30	+45.692	8	1
11	4	(Japan) Marino Sato	Virtuosi Racing	30	+47.522	14	
12	7	(New Zealand) Marcus Armstrong	Hitech Grand Prix	30	+54.718	3	
13	5	(New Zealand) Liam Lawson	Carlin	30	+1:31.534	2	
DNF	21	(Australia) Calan Williams	Trident	6	Accident	16	
DNF	3	(Australia) Jack Doohan	Virtuosi Racing	1	Collision damage	1	(2)
DNF	6	(United States) Logan Sargeant	Carlin	0	Collision	9	
DNF	10	(France) Théo Pourchaire	ART Grand Prix	0	Collision	13	
DNF	16	(Italy) Luca Ghiotto	DAMS	0	Collision	17	
DNF	15	(Switzerland) Ralph Boschung	Campos Racing	0	Collision	18^{1}	
DNF	14	(United Kingdom) Olli Caldwell	Campos Racing	0	Collision	20	
WD	23	(Colombia) Tatiana Calderón	Charouz Racing System	—	Withdrew^{2}	—	
DSQ	17	(Japan) Ayumu Iwasa	DAMS	30	Disqualified^{3}	7	
Fastest lap set by (Netherlands) Richard Verschoor: 1:33.155 (lap 29)

Notes:

- ^1 – Ralph Boschung originally qualified thirteenth, but received a five-place grid drop for causing a collision with Clément Novalak during the Sprint Race.
- ^2 – Tatiana Calderón withdrew from the remainder of the weekend following a medical advice. Thus, Charouz Racing System only ran one car in the Feature Race.
- ^3 – Ayumu Iwasa was disqualified from the feature race after it was found that the plank on the Japanese driver’s car was below the maximum thickness required by Article 4.2 of the Technical Regulations. As a result, Enzo Fittipaldi was promoted to the final podium place.

== Standings after the event ==
Drivers' Championship standings

	Pos.	Driver	Points
	1	(Brazil) Felipe Drugovich	241
	2	(France) Théo Pourchaire	164
	3	(United States) Logan Sargeant	135
	4	(Australia) Jack Doohan	126
4	5	(India) Jehan Daruvala	126

Teams' Championship standings

	Pos.	Team	Points
	1	(Netherlands) MP Motorsport	281
	2	(France) ART Grand Prix	281
	3	(United Kingdom) Carlin	258
1	4	(Italy) Prema Racing	224
1	5	(United Kingdom) Hitech Grand Prix	201

- Note: Only the top five positions are included for both sets of standings.
- Note: Bold name includes the Drivers' Champion.

== See also ==
- 2022 Italian Grand Prix
- 2022 Monza Formula 3 round

Previous round: 2022 Zandvoort Formula 2 round	FIA Formula 2 Championship; 2022 season	Next round: 2022 Yas Island Formula 2 round
Previous round: 2021 Monza Formula 2 round	Monza Formula 2 round	Next round: 2023 Monza Formula 2 round
