= 2022 Budapest Formula 2 round =

Motor racing event

(Hungary) 2022 Budapest Formula 2 round
Round details
- Round 10 of 14 in the 2022 FIA Formula 2 Championship.
- Layout of the Hungaroring
- Location: Hungaroring; Mogyoród, Hungary
- Course: Permanent racing circuit 4.381 km (2.722 mi)

Sprint Race
- Date: 30 July 2022
- Laps: 28
Podium
First	(Australia) Jack Doohan	Virtuosi Racing
Second	(Estonia) Jüri Vips	Hitech Grand Prix
Third	(Brazil) Enzo Fittipaldi	Charouz Racing System
Fastest lap
Driver	(Netherlands) Richard Verschoor	Trident
- Time: 1:30.414 (on lap 26)

Feature Race
- Date: 31 July 2022
- Laps: 37
Pole position
Driver	(Japan) Ayumu Iwasa	DAMS
Time	1:27.930	
Podium
First	(France) Théo Pourchaire	ART Grand Prix
Second	(Brazil) Enzo Fittipaldi	Charouz Racing System
Third	(Japan) Ayumu Iwasa	DAMS
Fastest lap
Driver	(Norway) Dennis Hauger	Prema Racing
- Time: 1:31.204 (on lap 36)

The 2022 Budapest FIA Formula 2 round was a motor racing event held between 29 and 31 July 2022 at the Hungaroring, Mogyoród, Hungary. It was the tenth round of the 2022 FIA Formula 2 Championship and was held in support of the 2022 Hungarian Grand Prix.

== Driver changes ==
After replacing Jake Hughes in Le Castellet, David Beckmann continued to compete for Van Amersfoort Racing after Hughes tested positive for COVID-19 during the Le Castellet round.

== Classification ==
=== Qualifying ===
After clinching his maiden win in Formula 2 five days ago, Ayumu Iwasa clinched his first pole position by 0.381 seconds ahead of Marcus Armstrong, while championship leader Felipe Drugovich qualified in third right in front of Théo Pourchaire, his nearest championship rival.

Pos.	No.	Driver	Entrant	Time	Grid SR	Grid FR
1	17	(Japan) Ayumu Iwasa	DAMS	1:27.930	10	1
2	7	(New Zealand) Marcus Armstrong	Hitech Grand Prix	+0.381	9	2
3	11	(Brazil) Felipe Drugovich	MP Motorsport	+0.410	8	3
4	10	(France) Théo Pourchaire	ART Grand Prix	+0.429	7	4
5	6	(United States) Logan Sargeant	Carlin	+0.451	6	5
6	8	(Estonia) Jüri Vips	Hitech Grand Prix	+0.461	5	6
7	9	(Denmark) Frederik Vesti	ART Grand Prix	+0.632	4	7
8	1	(Norway) Dennis Hauger	Prema Racing	+0.674	3	8
9	22	(Brazil) Enzo Fittipaldi	Charouz Racing System	+0.756	2	9
10	3	(Australia) Jack Doohan	Virtuosi Racing	+0.761	1	10
11	5	(New Zealand) Liam Lawson	Carlin	+0.820	11	11
12	2	(India) Jehan Daruvala	Prema Racing	+0.856	12	12
13	14	(United Kingdom) Olli Caldwell	Campos Racing	+0.873	13	13
14	20	(Netherlands) Richard Verschoor	Trident	+0.919	14	14
15	4	(Japan) Marino Sato	Virtuosi Racing	+1.088	15	15
16	23	(Turkey) Cem Bölükbaşı	Charouz Racing System	+1.172	16	16
17	24	(Germany) David Beckmann	Van Amersfoort Racing	+1.413	17	17
18	21	(Australia) Calan Williams	Trident	+1.416	18	18
19	12	(France) Clément Novalak	MP Motorsport	+1.551	19	19
20	15	(Spain) Roberto Merhi	Campos Racing	+1.617	20	20
21	16	(Israel) Roy Nissany	DAMS	+1.676	21	21
22	25	(Belgium) Amaury Cordeel	Van Amersfoort Racing	+1.862	22	22

=== Sprint race ===
Pos.	No.	Driver	Entrant	Laps	Time/Retired	Grid	Points
1	3	(Australia) Jack Doohan	Virtuosi Racing	28	45:42.642	1	10
2	8	(Estonia) Jüri Vips	Hitech Grand Prix	28	+5.275	5	8
3	22	(Brazil) Enzo Fittipaldi	Charouz Racing System	28	+6.325	2	6
4	11	(Brazil) Felipe Drugovich	MP Motorsport	28	+7.792	8	5
5	9	(Denmark) Frederik Vesti	ART Grand Prix	28	+9.266	4	4
6	5	(New Zealand) Liam Lawson	Carlin	28	+13.550	11	3
7	7	(New Zealand) Marcus Armstrong	Hitech Grand Prix	28	+20.185	9	2
8	17	(Japan) Ayumu Iwasa	DAMS	28	+20.723	10	1
9	10	(France) Théo Pourchaire	ART Grand Prix	28	+21.715	7	
10	14	(United Kingdom) Olli Caldwell	Campos Racing	28	+29.794	13	
11	21	(Australia) Calan Williams	Trident	28	+31.056	18	
12	24	(Germany) David Beckmann	Van Amersfoort Racing	28	+31.839	17	
13	25	(Belgium) Amaury Cordeel	Van Amersfoort Racing	28	+32.290	22	
14	15	(Spain) Roberto Merhi	Campos Racing	28	+48.884	20	
15	4	(Japan) Marino Sato	Virtuosi Racing	28	+51.818	15	
16	23	(Turkey) Cem Bölükbaşı	Charouz Racing System	28	+1:07.163	22	
17	2	(India) Jehan Daruvala	Prema Racing	28	+1:17.268	12	
18	20	(Netherlands) Richard Verschoor	Trident	28	+1:27.022^{1}	14	
19	16	(Israel) Roy Nissany	DAMS	27	+1 lap	21	
20	12	(France) Clément Novalak	MP Motorsport	27	+1 lap	19	
DNF	6	(United States) Logan Sargeant	Carlin	0	Collision damage	6	
DNF	1	(Norway) Dennis Hauger	Prema Racing	0	Collision	3	
Fastest lap set by (Netherlands) Richard Verschoor: 1:30.414 (lap 26)

Notes

- ^1 – Richard Verschoor received a total time penalty of 30 seconds for failing to serve a time penalty correctly.

=== Feature race ===
Pos.	No.	Driver	Entrant	Laps	Time/Retired	Grid	Points
1	10	(France) Théo Pourchaire	ART Grand Prix	37	58:56.681	4	25
2	22	(Brazil) Enzo Fittipaldi	Charouz Racing System	37	+3.641	9	18
3	17	(Japan) Ayumu Iwasa	DAMS	37	+5.927	1	15 (2)
4	9	(Denmark) Frederik Vesti	ART Grand Prix	37	+6.760	7	12
5	8	(Estonia) Jüri Vips	Hitech Grand Prix	37	+9.624	6	10
6	7	(New Zealand) Marcus Armstrong	Hitech Grand Prix	37	+13.542	2	8
7	5	(New Zealand) Liam Lawson	Carlin	37	+14.755	11	6
8	20	(Netherlands) Richard Verschoor	Trident	37	+20.156	14	4
9	11	(Brazil) Felipe Drugovich	MP Motorsport	37	+28.627	3	2
10	6	(United States) Logan Sargeant	Carlin	37	+29.230	5	1
11	2	(India) Jehan Daruvala	Prema Racing	37	+42.499	12	
12	12	(France) Clément Novalak	MP Motorsport	37	+42.805	19	
13	23	(Turkey) Cem Bölükbaşı	Charouz Racing System	37	+45.736	16	
14	24	(Germany) David Beckmann	Van Amersfoort Racing	37	+47.459	17	
15	4	(Japan) Marino Sato	Virtuosi Racing	37	+47.669	15	
16	21	(Australia) Calan Williams	Trident	37	+51.200	18	
17	25	(Belgium) Amaury Cordeel	Van Amersfoort Racing	37	+56.084	22	
18	16	(Israel) Roy Nissany	DAMS	37	+58.388^{1}	21	
19	1	(Norway) Dennis Hauger	Prema Racing	37	+1:17.981	8	
20†	14	(United Kingdom) Olli Caldwell	Campos Racing	36	Gearbox	13	
21†	15	(Spain) Roberto Merhi	Campos Racing	34	Electronics	20	
DNF	3	(Australia) Jack Doohan	Virtuosi Racing	2	Mechanical	10	
Fastest lap set by (Norway) Dennis Hauger: 1:31.204 (lap 36)

Notes:

- ^1 – Roy Nissany originally finished sixteenth, but was later given a ten-second time penalty for causing a collision with Roberto Merhi.

== Standings after the event ==
Drivers' Championship standings

	Pos.	Driver	Points
	1	(Brazil) Felipe Drugovich	180
	2	(France) Théo Pourchaire	159
	3	(United States) Logan Sargeant	119
3	4	(Brazil) Enzo Fittipaldi	100
1	5	(India) Jehan Daruvala	94

Teams' Championship standings

	Pos.	Team	Points
	1	(France) ART Grand Prix	250
1	2	(United Kingdom) Carlin	207
1	3	(Netherlands) MP Motorsport	206
1	4	(United Kingdom) Hitech Grand Prix	164
1	5	(Italy) Prema Racing	161

- Note: Only the top five positions are included for both sets of standings.

== See also ==
- 2022 Hungarian Grand Prix
- 2022 Budapest Formula 3 round

Previous round: 2022 Le Castellet Formula 2 round	FIA Formula 2 Championship; 2022 season	Next round: 2022 Spa-Francorchamps Formula 2 round
Previous round: 2020 Budapest Formula 2 round	Budapest Formula 2 round	Next round: 2023 Budapest Formula 2 round
