= Felipe Drugovich =

Brazilian racing driver (born 2000)

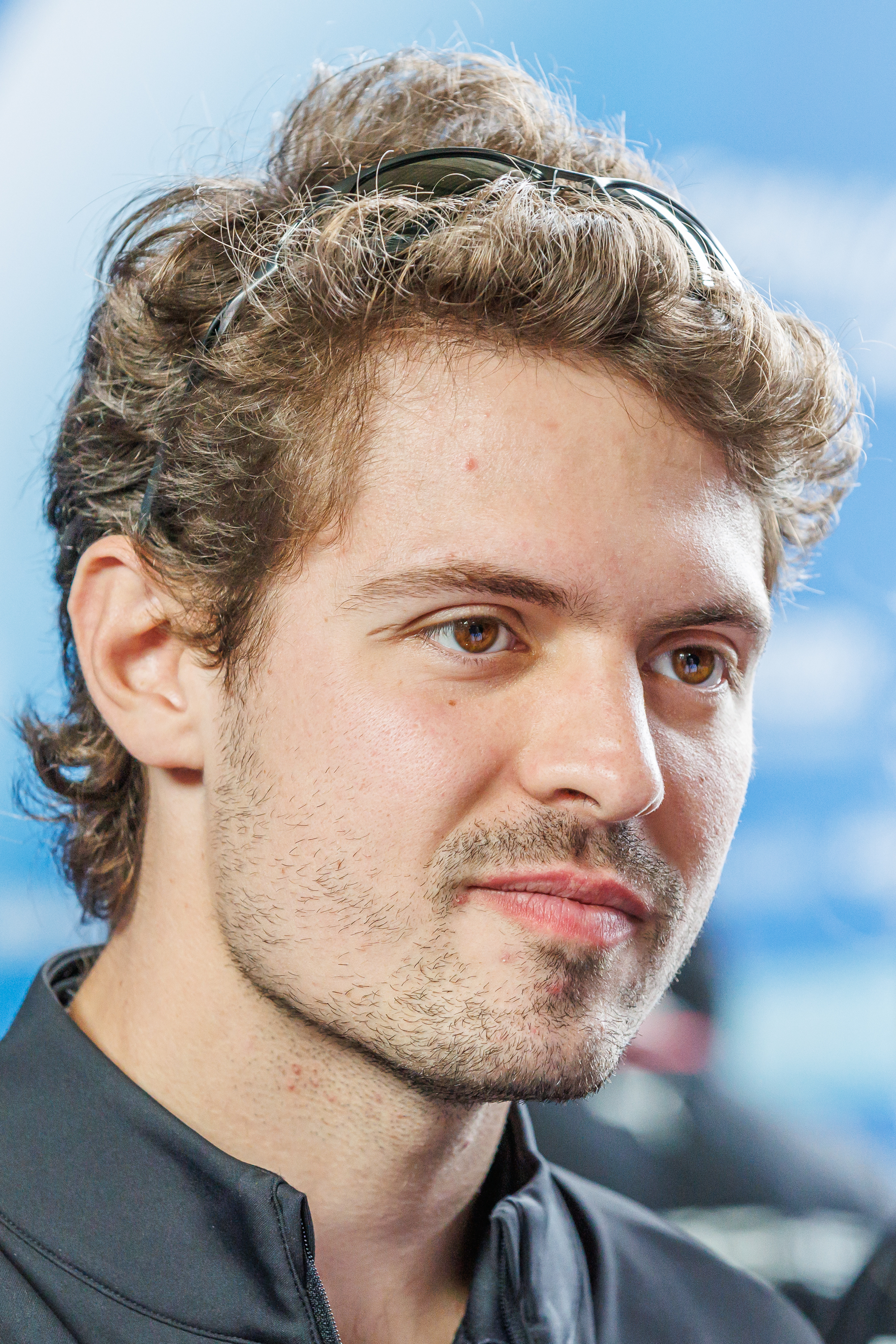
- Drugovich at the 2025 Berlin ePrix
- Born: Felipe Drugovich Roncato; 23 May 2000 (age 26); Maringá, Paraná, Brazil
- Nationality: (Brazil) Brazilian

Formula E career
- Debut season: 2024–25
- Current team: Andretti
- Categorisation: FIA Platinum
- Car number: 28
- Former teams: Mahindra
- Starts: 19
- Wins: 0
- Podiums: 1
- Poles: 1
- Fastest laps: 0
- Best finish: 14th in 2025–26

24 Hours of Le Mans career
- Years: 2024–2025
- Teams: Cadillac Whelen
- Best finish: 15th (2024)
- Class wins: 0

Previous series
- 2024; 2020–2022; 2019; 2018; 2017–2018; 2016–2018; 2017; 2016–2017: ELMS; FIA Formula 2; FIA Formula 3; Pro Mazda; Euroformula Open; MRF Challenge; Italian F4; ADAC F4

Championship titles
- 2022; 2018; 2017–18: FIA Formula 2; Euroformula Open; MRF Challenge
Medal record
Motor racing
Representing Brazil
Race of Champions
Runner-up	2023 Piteå	Team
- Website: https://felipedrugovich.com.br/en/

Felipe Drugovich Roncato (born 23 May 2000) is a Brazilian racing driver who competes in Formula E for Andretti.

Drugovich is the 2018 Euroformula Open champion and the 2022 Formula 2 champion. He served as the reserve driver for Aston Martin in Formula One from 2022 to 2025.

== Junior career ==
=== Karting ===
Born in Maringá, in Southern Brazil, Drugovich competed in numerous karting championships across Brazil and Europe, taking major championship victories.

=== Lower formulae ===
==== ADAC Formula 4 ====
Drugovich made his single-seaters debut in 2016, joining Neuhauser Racing in ADAC Formula 4. He achieved his first and only podium of the season in third place at the Zandvoort round. He ended the season finished fourth in the rookie standings and twelfth overall, with 79.5 points. The following season, Drugovich switched to Van Amersfoort Racing, and also made his debut in Italian F4 with the team. Drugovich claimed seven wins — the most of any driver throughout the season. Ultimately, he finished third in the standings with 236.5 points, missing out by nine points to champion Jüri Vips as a technical issue in the final round at the Hockenheimring potentially costing Drugovich the title.

==== MRF Challenge ====
Drugovich also competed in the MRF Challenge, claiming his maiden single-seater victory in the second race of round two and finishing fourth overall. The following year, Drugovich won the title by taking ten wins out of the sixteen races held that season with two races left.

=== FIA Formula 3 European Championship ===
Drugovich stepped up to the FIA Formula 3 European Championship with Van Amersfoort Racing for the 2017 season finale at the Hockenheimring.

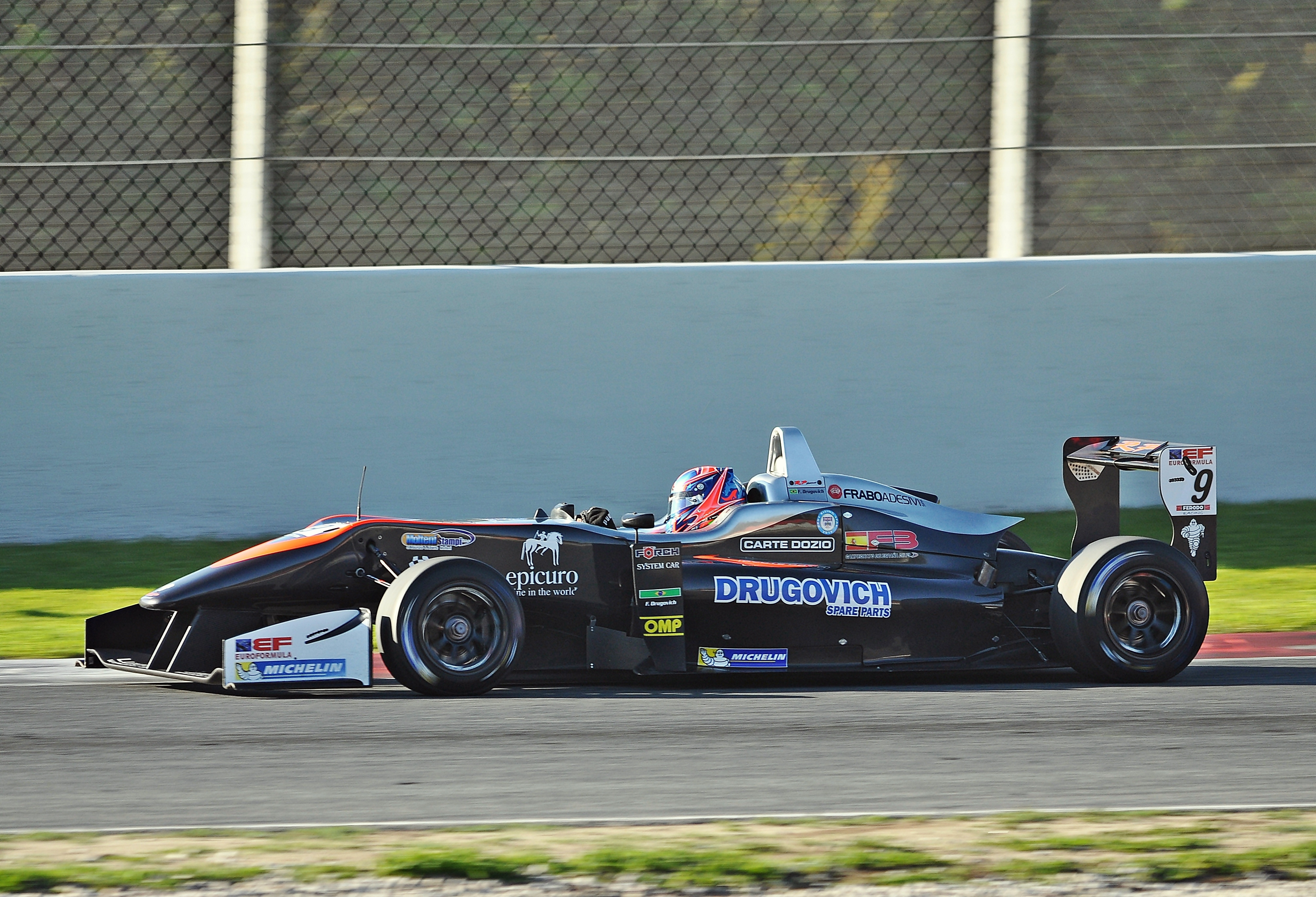
Drugovich at the Euroformula Open in 2017

=== Euroformula Open ===
Drugovich made his debut in the final round of the 2017 season as a guest driver with RP Motorsport, scoring a pole. Despite a mistake in the first race, Drugovich managed to take his first Euroformula Open win in the second. The following year, Drugovich reunited with RP to contest the championship full-time. He proceeded to dominate the championship finishing on the podium at all races, claiming a record fourteen wins and taking the title at Monza with two rounds to spare. In an article by Motorsport.com, Drugovich was ranked 18th in the top-20 junior single-seater drivers of 2018.

=== Pro Mazda ===
Following the injuries sustained by Harrison Scott in Toronto, Drugovich was drafted in by RP to replace him for the 2018 Pro Mazda round at Mid-Ohio.

=== GP3 Series ===
In November 2018, Drugovich partook in the post-season test at Yas Marina with ART Grand Prix. He would go to set the 11th and 17th fastest times on Day 1 and Day 2 respectively.

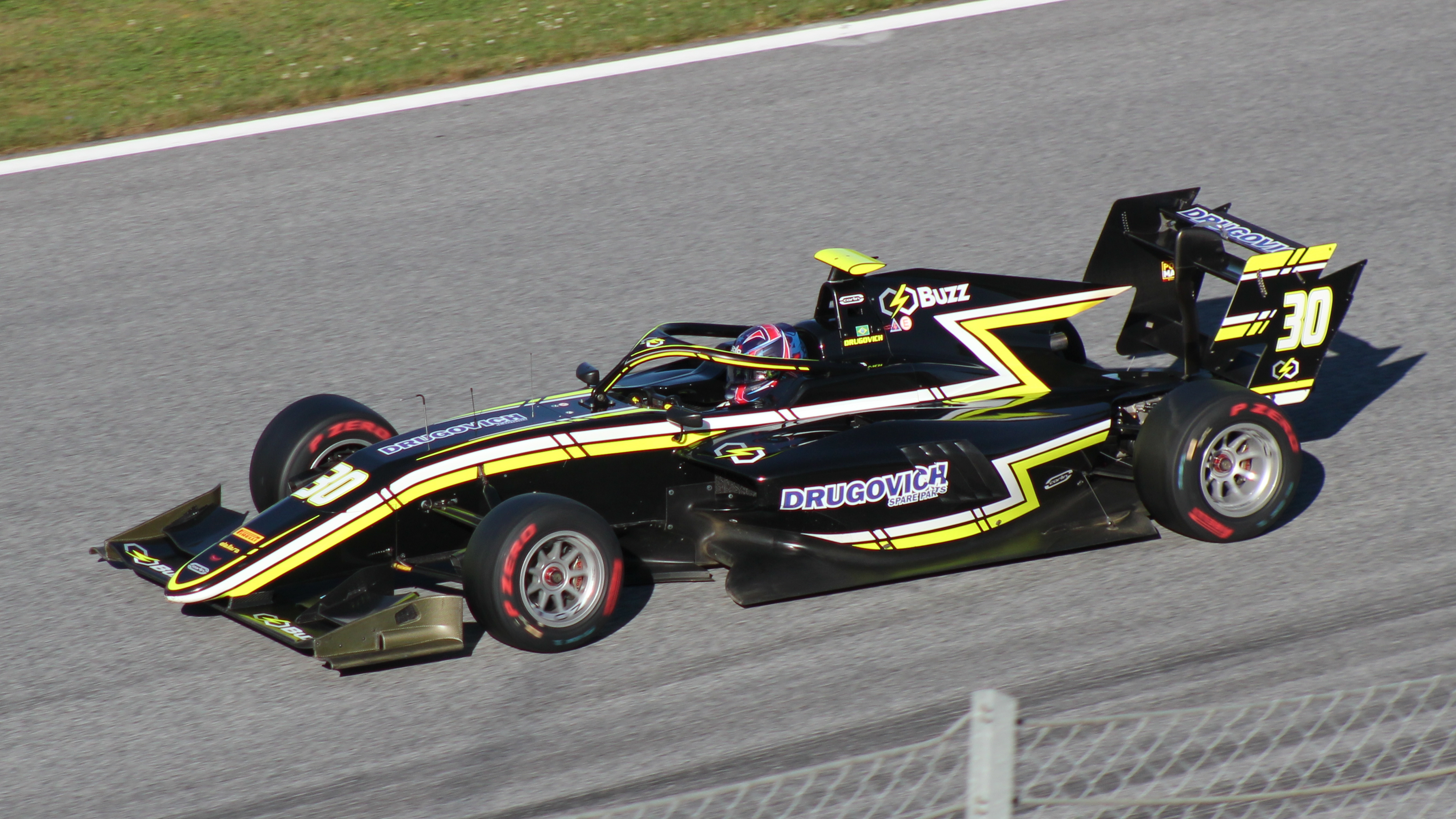
Drugovich with Carlin in 2019

=== FIA Formula 3 Championship ===
In February 2019, Carlin Buzz Racing confirmed that Drugovich would race with them in the inaugural FIA Formula 3 championship, alongside Logan Sargeant and Teppei Natori. His season proved difficult, with Drugovich scoring points only one occasion, finishing in sixth place in race one of the Hungary round. He was set for another points finish in race two before contact with Robert Shwartzman while fighting for third place resulted in a puncture, and they both ultimately retired from the race. Drugovich ended the season sixteenth in the standings with eight points, scoring more points than his two teammates combined.

=== FIA Formula 2 Championship ===
==== 2020 ====
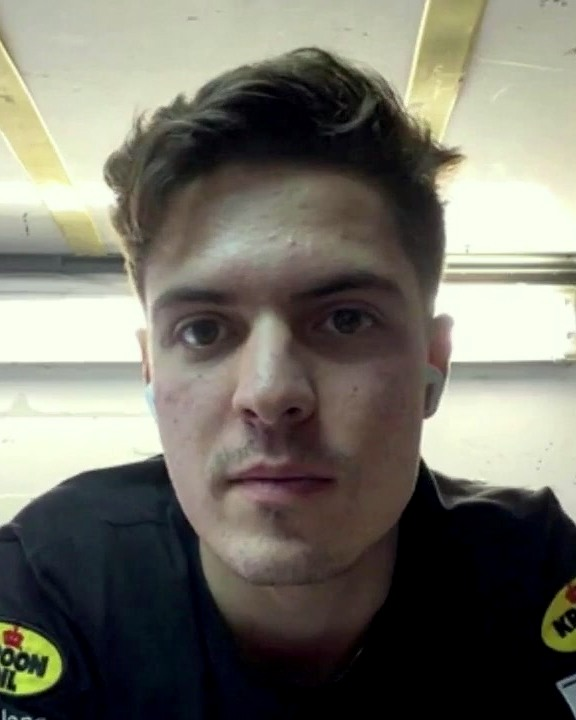
Drugovich in 2020

Drugovich was signed to MP Motorsport for the 2020 season, partnering Nobuharu Matsushita. He impressed on his debut in Austria, qualifying second. After dropping positions on the opening lap, he eventually finished eighth, which placed him on reverse pole for the sprint race. He proceeded to lead every lap and claim his maiden Formula 2 victory, despite multiple safety car interruptions. His momentum stalled in the second Austrian round, where he qualified tenth and finished outside the points in both races. In Budapest, Drugovich qualified eighteenth but employed an alternate tyre strategy in the feature race, recovering to fifth. A poor start in the sprint race left him outside the points.

He secured his maiden pole position in Silverstone, but lacked race pace in the feature race, finishing seventh, while he finished sixth in the sprint. The second Silverstone round yielded a single point, with a tenth-place finish in the feature race. Drugovich qualified fourth in Barcelona but lost a place at the start of the feature race. A well-timed pit stop elevated him to second place before a safety car neutralised the field; after switching to fresh tyres, he ultimately finished seventh. He responded in the sprint race with a dominant performance, taking the lead at the start before going on to win by nine seconds. His campaign suffered a downturn starting from Spa-Francorchamps, where contact with teammate Matsushita damaged his car and resulted in a last-place finish; this was later compounded by a post-race disqualification due to pitting on the last lap.

Drugovich endured a further non-scoring weekend in Monza after qualifying outside the top eight, before being taken out of the sprint by Roy Nissany. His poor run was briefly interrupted in Mugello where he finished fourth in the feature race after losing a podium position on the last lap. In the sprint race however, a car issue slowed him whilst running in the points, and he classified fifteenth. More misfortune befell Drugovich in Sochi as he was eliminated in an opening lap collision during the feature race. Drugovich returned to form in Bahrain by qualifying second, and he eventually won the feature race by fourteen seconds after passing polesitter Ilott on-track. During the second Bahrain round, Drugovich qualified fifth and added a third place finish in the feature race following a post-race penalty for Nikita Mazepin. Drugovich concluded his rookie Formula 2 season ninth in the championship with 121 points, recording three wins, one pole and four podiums.

==== 2021 ====
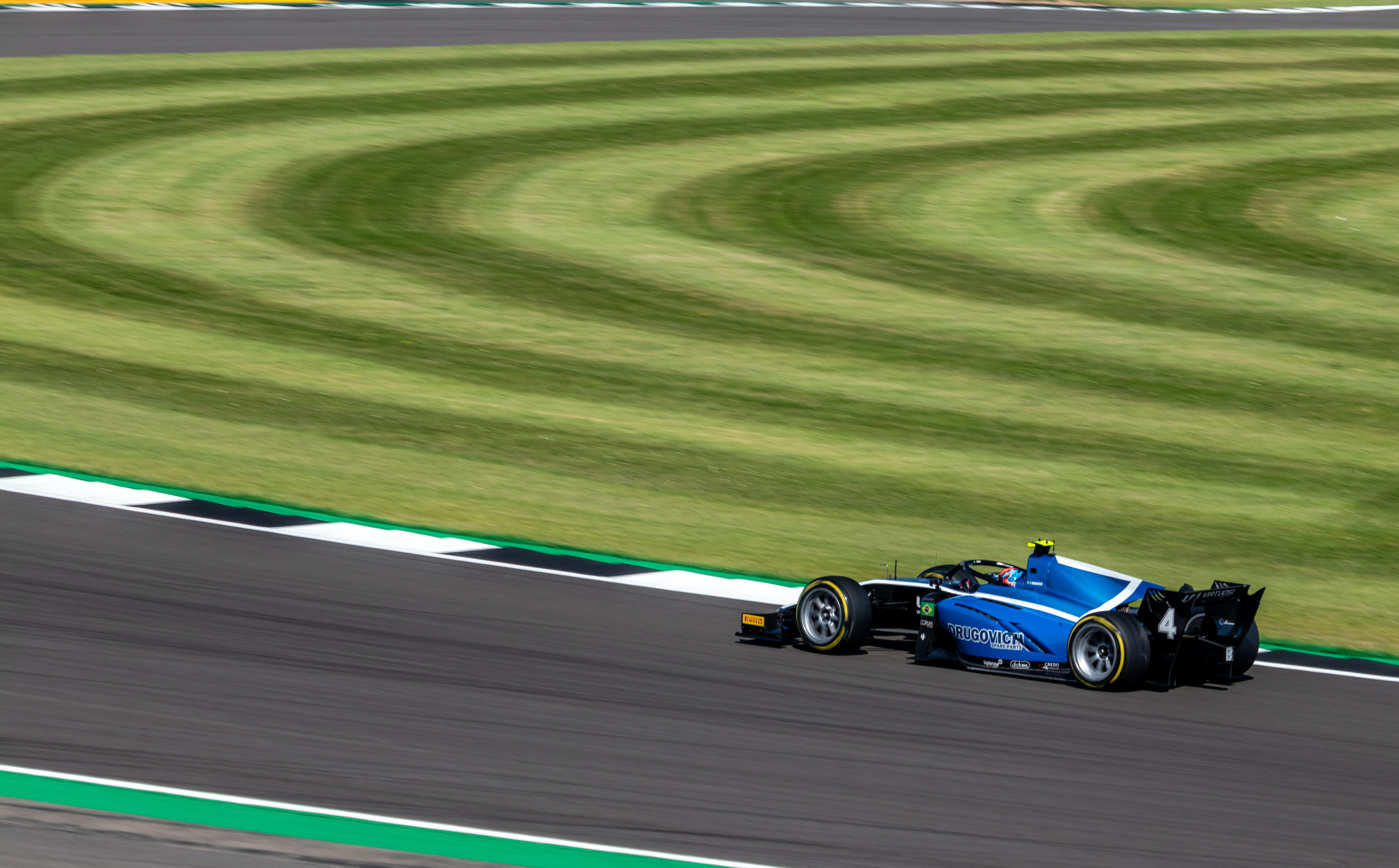
Drugovich driving the Dallara F2 2018 at the 2021 Silverstone Formula 2 round.

Drugovich joined UNI-Virtuosi Racing in 2021, alongside Guanyu Zhou. He began the year strongly in Bahrain by qualifying third. However, his race results were compromised by incidents and strategic setbacks; front wing damage in the first sprint necessitated a pit stop and he finished sixteenth, while a late safety car in the second sprint dropped him down the order after an early charge. In the feature race, Drugovich ran in the top three during the opening phase, but his pace faded following a safety car, eventually finishing ninth after a penalty for a safety car infringement. In Monaco, Drugovich secured his first podium of the season during the first sprint race after inheriting second place following Christian Lundgaard's retirement. A gamble on slick tyres during mixed conditions in the second sprint proved unsuccessful, but recovered in the feature race, executing an early pit stop to finish third after an incident for Dan Ticktum ahead.

Drugovich endured a tough weekend in Baku. A first-lap collision with Oscar Piastri in the opening sprint earned him a ten-second penalty, which dropped him out of the top ten, while he also failed to score points in the second sprint despite making up positions. He rebounded in the feature race with a charge to fourth place. More consistent points followed in Silverstone, with finishes of fourth, sixth and sixth across the three races. His momentum stalled in Monza, as he crashed out of the first sprint race after taking out Dan Ticktum earlier. He made limited progress in the second sprint, while confusion over front wing damage during his pit stop in the feature race dropped him to twelfth, concluding the weekend without points.

Further misfortune befell Drugovich in Sochi, where he crashed en route to the sprint race grid and was declared unfit to compete in the remainder of the event. Drugovich returned to form in Jeddah, qualifying fifth and finishing fourth in the opening sprint race. Contact from Jüri Vips behind hindered his pace during the second sprint, though post-race penalties elevated him to tenth. He secured fifth place in a red-flagged feature race. At the Abu Dhabi finale, Drugovich qualified eighth and finished second in the opening sprint after pressuring Daruvala throughout the race. He added further points in the second sprint, before concluding the season with a third-place podium in the feature race, overtaking Robert Shwartzman late on an alternate strategy. Drugovich ended the season eighth in the drivers' standings with 105 points and four podiums, but did not win a race.

==== 2022: Champion ====
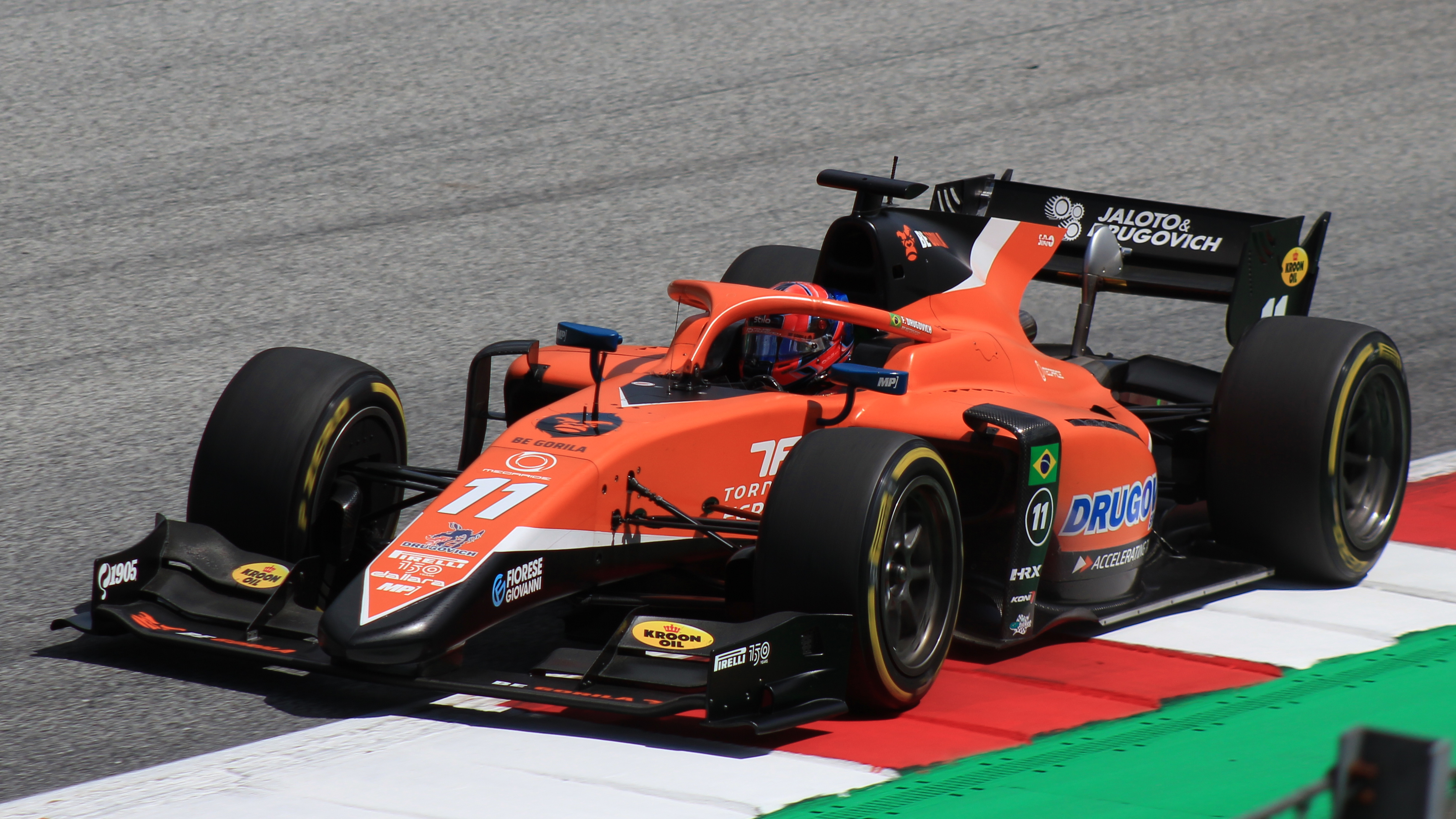
Drugovich racing for MP Motorsport during the 2022 Spielberg Formula 2 round.

Drugovich re-joined MP Motorsport for 2022, this time partnering FIA Formula 3 graduate Clément Novalak. Upon re-joining the Dutch outfit, he stated that he "felt at home". In Bahrain, Drugovich qualified tenth and started from reverse pole in the sprint race, where he had a poor start and only managed to recover to fifth. In the feature race, an early pit stop strategy saw him run as high as second before dropping back to sixth on ageing tyres. In Jeddah, Drugovich secured his first pole position of the season. He finished fourth on the road in the sprint race after numerous overtakes, but was promoted to the podium following the post-race disqualification of Jake Hughes. The next day, he proceeded to dominate the feature race to claim his first win of the year, taking the championship lead for the first time. In Imola, Drugovich qualified twelfth but recovered to fifth in the sprint race after gaining multiple positions on the opening corner, before passing Logan Sargeant on the final lap. A safety car compromised his alternative strategy in the feature race, limiting him to tenth, which dropped him to second in the standings behind Théo Pourchaire.

In Barcelona, Drugovich was due to start on reverse pole for the sprint race, but was penalised three places for impeding. Despite this setback, he managed to take the lead into the first corner, and remained unchallenged for the remainder of the race to secure the victory. In the feature race, a strong pit strategy allowed him to rejoin in the top three, and he soon dispatched his rivals to take the win. His double victory marked the first time a driver won both races during a FIA Formula 2 weekend, which significantly extended his championship lead. Despite crashing in qualifying in Monaco, Drugovich inherited pole position following a penalty for Liam Lawson. A puncture in the sprint race ended his sprint prematurely on lap 20, but he rebounded in the feature race, resisting sustained pressure from Pourchaire to claim his fourth victory of the season. In Baku, he qualified fifth and finished in the same position during the sprint. In the feature race, Drugovich inherited third place after late-race incidents ahead, extending his championship advantage to 51 points.

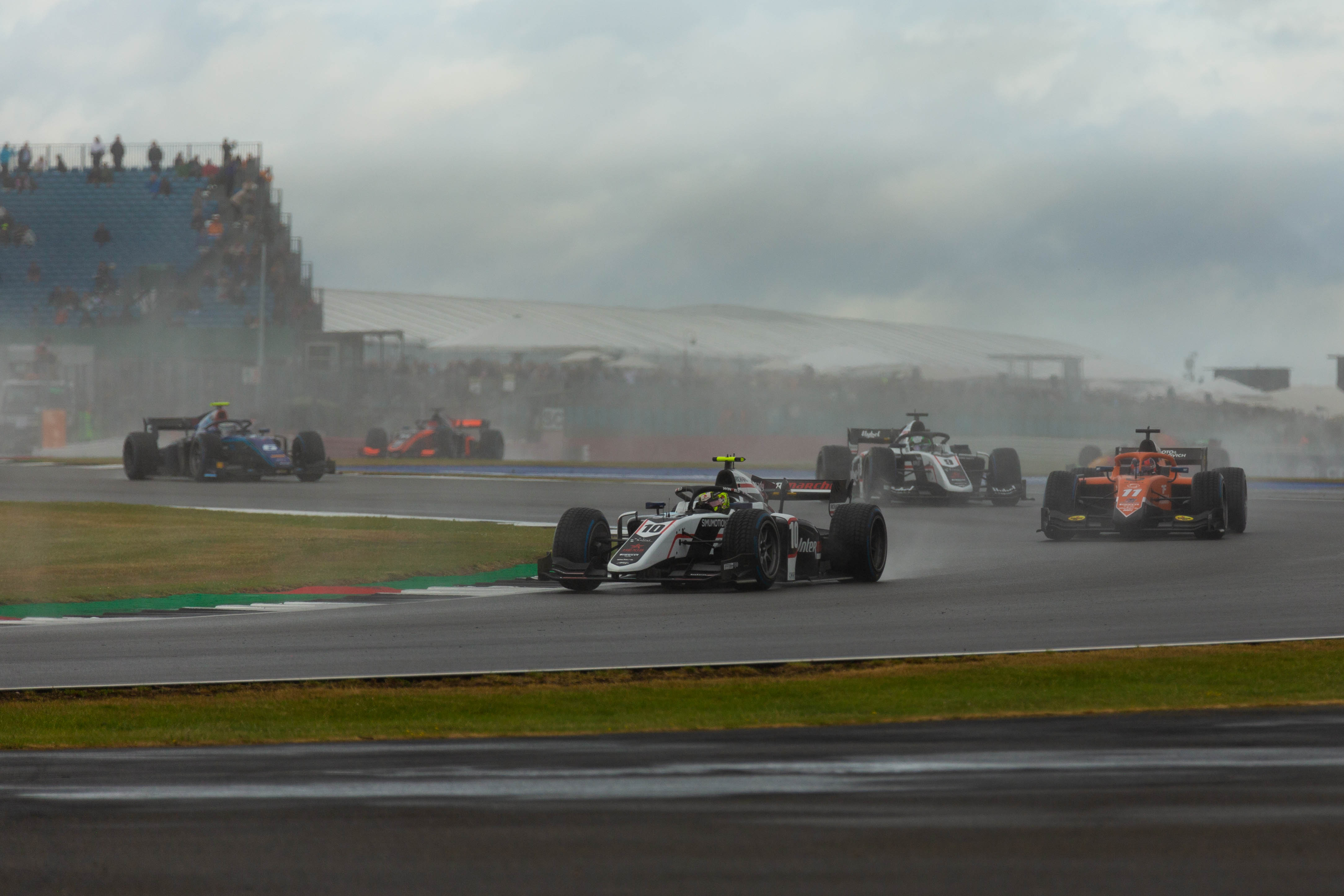
Drugovich (pictured in Silverstone) secured five wins on his way to taking the Formula 2 title.

In Silverstone, Drugovich qualified third and scored consistently across the weekend, fifth in a wet sprint race and fourth in the feature race after a last-lap pass on Frederik Vesti. In Austria, he placed fourth in the sprint race, though a strategic misstep backfired for Drugovich in the feature race after starting on wet tyres on a drying track; he finished eleventh. In France, he qualified second, but his lap time was deleted due to track limits, dropping him to sixth. He finished fourth in the sprint race, later being promoted to the podium following a penalty ahead, and concluded the weekend with fourth place in the feature race. In Budapest, despite qualifying third, tyre degradation limited him to ninth in the feature race, allowing Pourchaire to close the gap further ahead of the summer break.

Drugovich claimed pole in Spa-Francorchamps, and recovered from twelfth to fourth following a late pit stop for fresh tyres. He finished second in the feature race after being undercut by Jack Doohan during the pit stop phase. In Zandvoort, he secured consecutive poles for the first time in his career, and returned to winning form in the feature race, extending his championship lead to 69 points. In Monza, Drugovich qualified fourth, but received a grid penalty for the sprint race after breaching yellow flag regulations. Despite retiring early after contact with Amaury Cordeel, Pourchaire's non-scoring finish ensured Drugovich was crowned the 2022 FIA Formula 2 Champion. He added points in the feature race with sixth place despite limited pace. At the Abu Dhabi finale, Drugovich secured third place late in the sprint race after a move on Amaury Cordeel, and concluded the season with second place in the feature race after pressuring Ayumu Iwasa during the closing laps. Drugovich ended the year as champion with 265 points; 101 ahead of Pourchaire; recording five wins, four poles and eleven podiums.

== Formula One ==
On 12 September 2022, two days after winning the 2022 Formula 2 Championship, Drugovich was announced as the first member of the newly formed AMF1 Driver Development Programme, while also joining Aston Martin as a reserve driver. He made his first appearance in a Formula One car by testing the AMR21 at Silverstone in early November, fulfilling the necessary requirements to obtain an FIA Super Licence and participate in free practice at the 2022 Abu Dhabi Grand Prix. Drugovich also took part in the post-season test in Abu Dhabi with Aston Martin.

For the 2023 season, Drugovich, alongside fellow Aston Martin reserve Stoffel Vandoorne, was added to McLaren's pool of reserve drivers for the first 15 races of the championship. He drove the Aston Martin AMR23 during the first session of pre-season testing in Bahrain after Lance Stroll suffered an injury in a cycling accident. Shortly after leaving the pit lane for the first time, Drugovich was forced to stop his car on track due to an electrical fault, triggering a red flag. He returned to the car on the final morning of testing and completed a combined total of 117 laps. Additional running followed in private tests with the AMR21 at Silverstone in April and at the Red Bull Ring in June. Drugovich returned to the AMR23 for first practice at the Italian Grand Prix, before undertaking further testing at the Hungaroring in September, At the Abu Dhabi Grand Prix, he participated in first practice, finishing second fastest, and later completed 123 laps in the post-season test.

Drugovich continued as test and reserve driver for Aston Martin in 2024. In September, he participated in tyre testing at the Circuit de Barcelona-Catalunya for Pirelli's 2026 prototype tyres. He made his first free practice appearance of the season at the Mexico City Grand Prix, finishing eighteenth, before returning to the car for first practice at the Abu Dhabi Grand Prix, where he set the ninth fastest time. He later took part in the Abu Dhabi Pirelli tyre test, completing 146 laps.

Drugovich retained his role as test and reserve driver for Aston Martin in 2025. He made his first free practice session of the year at the Bahrain Grand Prix, finishing sixteenth, less than a tenth behind teammate Lance Stroll. He was involved in testing Pirelli's 2026 prototype tyres following the British Grand Prix. At the Hungarian Grand Prix, Drugovich stepped in for Fernando Alonso during first practice after the Spaniard sustained an injury. Following his signing with Andretti in Formula E, Drugovich departed Aston Martin following the Las Vegas Grand Prix.

== Formula E ==
In April 2023, Drugovich was selected to drive for Maserati MSG Racing during the Formula E Berlin rookie test, finishing first, setting a lap just two tenths slower than the best time in the SABIC Berlin E-Prix of Maximilian Günther. Drugovich returned with Maserati during the rookie practice session at the Rome ePrix, in which he once again topped the timesheets.

Drugovich returned with Maserati in the Berlin rookie test held in May 2024.

=== Mahindra (2025) ===
==== 2024–25 season ====
It is quite difficult actually to come and be straight away very competitive. I think on one lap, he has been proving to be extremely, extremely fast.

— Edoardo Mortara praising Drugovich's pace at his Formula E debut during the 2025 Berlin ePrix

During the 2025 Berlin ePrix, Drugovich made his Formula E debut with Mahindra Racing alongside Edoardo Mortara, stepping in for an absent Nyck de Vries who fulfilled driving duties in the FIA World Endurance Championship. He endured a difficult debut as a drive-through penalty at the start of the race due to a gearbox change effectively ruined his race, and he finished in 17th place. Despite another difficult qualifying in the second race, two late Attack Modes allowed him to charge up the field, eventually collecting his maiden points in seventh.

=== Andretti (2025–) ===
==== 2025–26 season ====
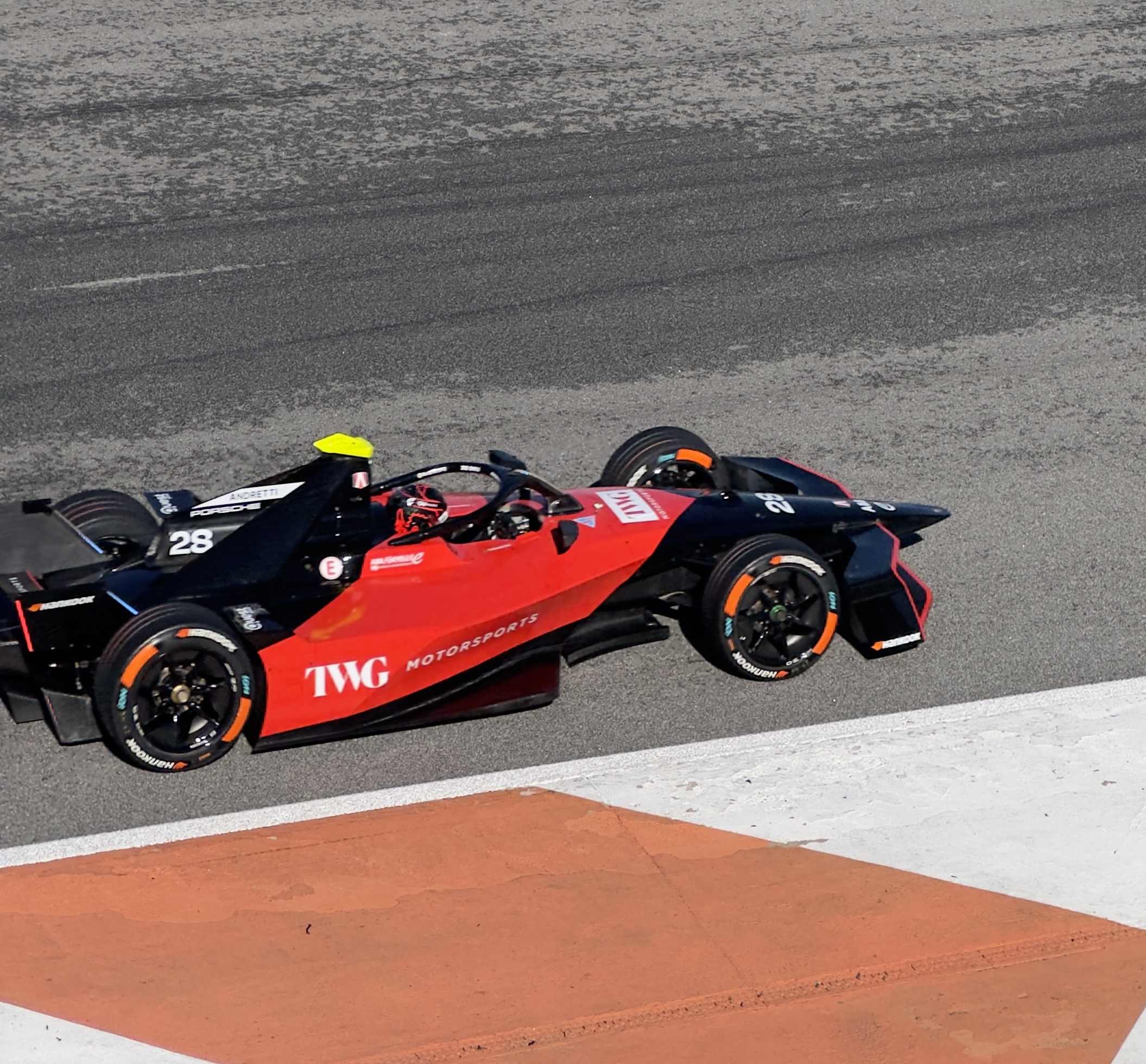
Drugovich driving the Formula E Gen3 Evo during pre-season testing of the 2025–26 Formula E season

Following a successful cameo appearance, Andretti signed Drugovich to compete in the 2025–26 season alongside 2022–23 champion Jake Dennis. After crashing in qualifying for the season opener at São Paulo, Drugovich climbed up the order late in the race by being able to use attack mode after a late safety car; however, a penalty for overtaking two cars during a full-course yellow period demoted him from fifth to 12th. In Mexico City, Drugovich started and finished 15th. He then qualified second for the Miami ePrix and fought for a podium place in a rain-affected race, before misjudging his braking point entering turn 13 on lap 26 and hitting the back of António Félix da Costa's Jaguar. The subsequent pit stop for a new front wing and a ten-second penalty caused Drugovich to finish 18th. At Jeddah, Drugovich finished the two races 15th and 12th, the former being caused by debris getting stuck in a radiator duct which forced Drugovich to drive conservatively to manage the battery's temperatures. Drugovich briefly took the lead in Madrid thanks to an early attack mode activation, but subsequently slid down the order to finish 15th.

==== 2026–27 season ====
Drugovich will remain at Andretti into the Gen4 era alongside Jake Dennis for the 2026–27 season.

== Endurance racing ==
=== 2024 season ===
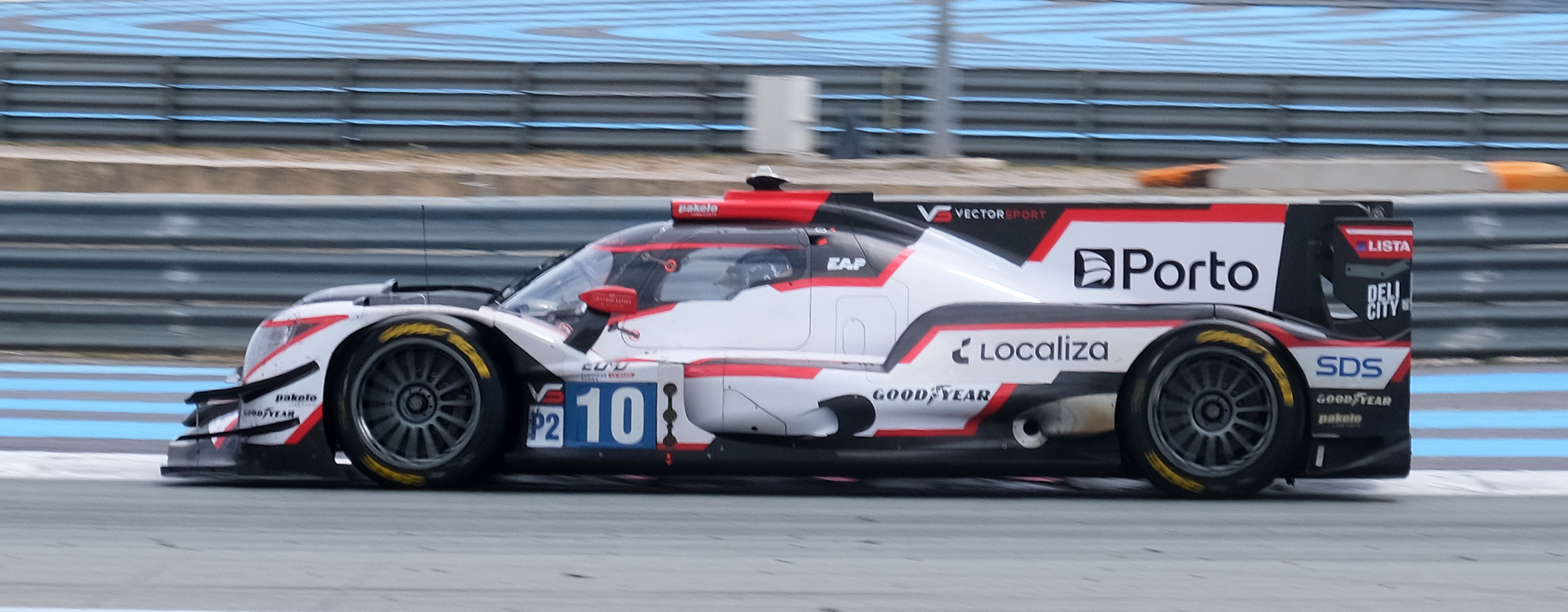
Drugovich driving during the 2024 4 Hours of Le Castellet

After a year on the sidelines, Drugovich returned to racing in the 2024 European Le Mans Series with Vector Sport, partnering Stéphane Richelmi and Ryan Cullen. The trio finished tenth in class in the opening two races. At Imola, Drugovich shuffled up the pack thanks to the team's successful pit strategy, before holding off Tom Dillmann to finish third. The No. 10 Vector car then finished tenth overall at Spa, before Drugovich was forced to miss the penultimate round at Mugello due to a "clash"; he was replaced by Patrick Pilet. At the Portimão season finale, the Vector entry retired, leaving it 12th of the 14 LMP2 Pro lineups in the teams' standings.

Drugovich also took his part in his first 24 Hours of Le Mans that year with Whelen Cadillac Racing, finishing 15th in the Hypercar class.

=== 2025 season ===
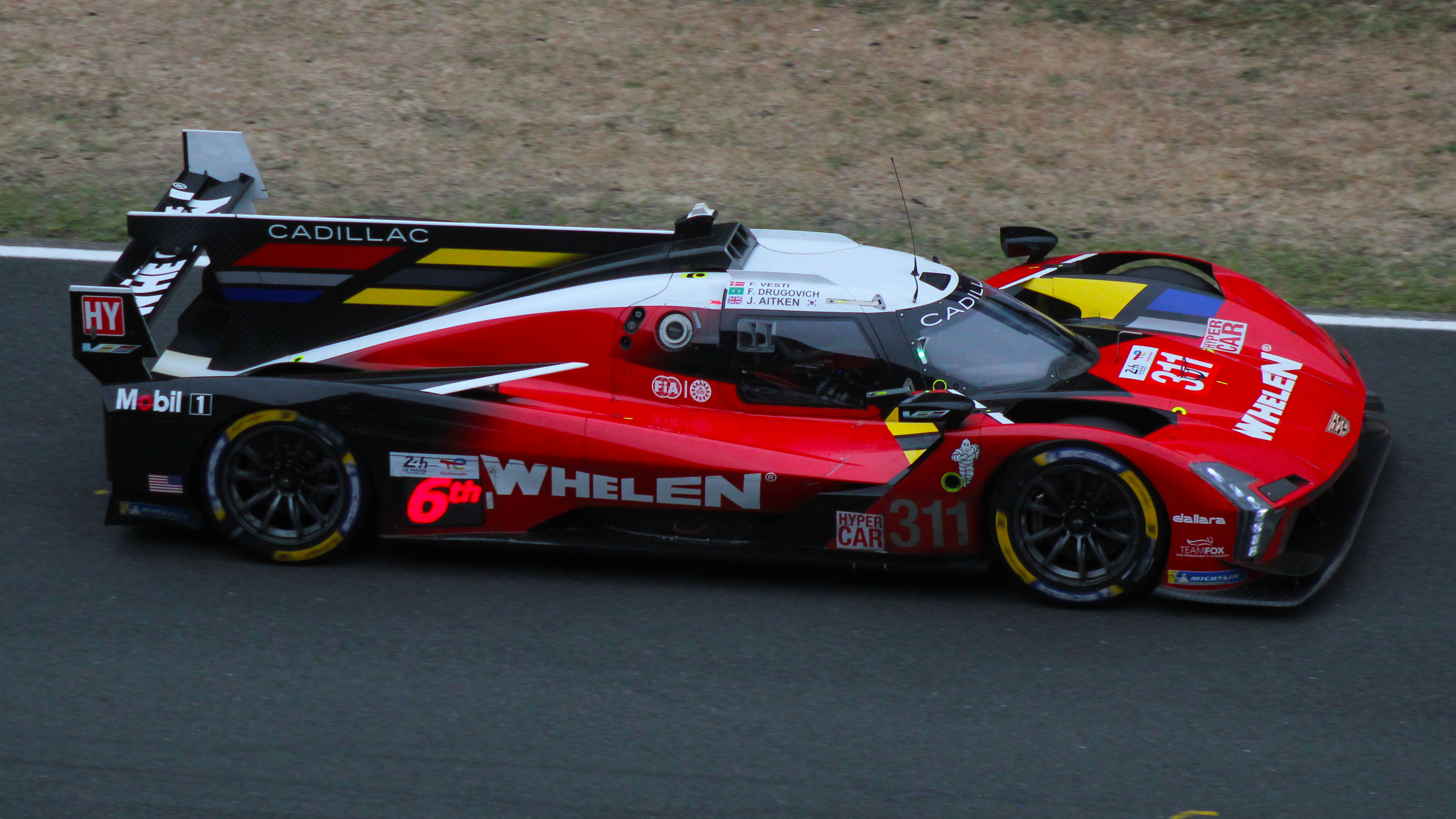
Drugovich's No. 311 car at the 2025 24 Hours of Le Mans

Drugovich signed with Cadillac Whelen Racing to take part in the 2025 24 Hours of Daytona. He also returned to the 24 Hours of Le Mans, but retired with a debilitating engine issue.

=== 2026 season ===
Drugovich served as Cadillac Racing's reserve driver at the 2026 24 Hours of Le Mans.

== Other racing ==
=== IndyCar ===
Drugovich was offered the opportunity to test for IndyCar Series team Ed Carpenter Racing during the winter testing season after the 2023 season but turned down the opportunity. However, a year later, he would be confirmed to test IndyCar machinery with Chip Ganassi Racing at Barber Motorsports Park. Following the test, the Brazilian stated that he was "surprised by the speed".

=== Race of Champions ===
Drugovich was chosen to race in the 2023 Race of Champions in Sweden. He was paired up with Thierry Neuville in the ROC Nations Cup, competing for the All-Star team. The pair defeated Team USA and Team Germany, before losing to Team Norway in the final.

== Personal life ==
Drugovich was born in Maringá, Paraná, Brazil. He has Austrian, Italian and Slavic ancestry, as well as having dual Brazilian and Italian citizenship.

His maternal uncles Sérgio Drugovich and Oswaldo Drugovich Jr. are also racing drivers.

== Karting record ==
=== Karting career summary ===
Season	Series	Team	Position
2009	Campeonato Sulbrasileiro de Kart — PMK/Mirim		5th
2010	Campeonato Sulbrasileiro de Kart — PCKS/Super Cadete		4th
2010	Campeonato Sulbrasileiro de Kart — PCK/Cadete		2nd
2011	Super Kart Brasil — AMF Super Cadete		4th
2011	Campeonato Sulbrasileiro de Kart — PCKS/Super Cadete		1st
2011	Campeonato Sulbrasileiro de Kart — PCK/Cadete		3rd
2012	Campeonato Sulbrasileiro de Kart — PJMK/Júnior Menor		1st
2012	Copa Brasil de Kart - Júnior Menor		NC
2012	Campeonato Sudamericano de Karting — Pre Junior - Uruguay		4th
2013	Copa Brasil de Kart — Júnior	PR	5th
2014	WSK Champions Cup — KFJ	Baby Race Srl	16th
2014	South Garda Winter Cup — KF3	Baby Race Srl	16th
2014	CIK-FIA European Championship — KFJ	Baby Race Srl	26th
2014	CIK-FIA World Championship — KFJ	Kosmic Racing Dept	15th
2015	WSK Champions Cup — KFJ	Kosmic Racing Team	3rd
2015	South Garda Winter Cup — KFJ	Kosmic Racing Team	9th
2015	WSK Super Master Series — KFJ	Kosmic Racing Team	5th
2015	WSK Night Edition — KFJ	Kosmic Racing Team	10th
2015	CIK-FIA European Championship — KFJ	Kosmic Racing Team	8th
2015	CIK-FIA World Championship — KFJ	Kosmic Racing Team	8th
2015	WSK Final Cup — KF	Kosmic Racing Team	7th

== Racing record ==
=== Racing career summary ===
Season	Series	Team	Races	Wins	Poles	F/Laps	Podiums	Points	Position
2016	ADAC Formula 4 Championship	Neuhauser Racing	24	0	0	0	1	79.5	12th
2016–17	MRF Challenge Formula 2000	MRF Racing	16	1	0	0	4	167	4th
2017	ADAC Formula 4 Championship	Van Amersfoort Racing	21	7	3	6	9	236.5	**3rd**
2017	Italian F4 Championship	Van Amersfoort Racing	6	1	1	1	2	0	NC†
2017	FIA Formula 3 European Championship	Van Amersfoort Racing	3	0	0	0	0	0	NC†
2017	Euroformula Open Championship	RP Motorsport	2	1	1	0	1	0	NC†
2017–18	MRF Challenge Formula 2000	MRF Racing	16	10	2	5	13	337	**1st**
2018	Euroformula Open Championship	RP Motorsport	16	14	10	10	16	405	**1st**
2018	Spanish Formula 3 Championship	RP Motorsport	6	5	3	4	6	157	**1st**
2018	Pro Mazda Championship	RP Motorsport	2	0	0	0	0	31	20th
2019	FIA Formula 3 Championship	Carlin Buzz Racing	16	0	0	0	0	8	16th
2019	Macau Grand Prix	Carlin Buzz Racing	1	0	0	0	0	N/A	24th
2020	FIA Formula 2 Championship	MP Motorsport	24	3	1	1	4	121	9th
2021	FIA Formula 2 Championship	UNI-Virtuosi Racing	21	0	0	0	4	105	8th
2021	Porsche All-Star Race Brasil	N/A	1	0	0	0	0	N/A	8th
2022	FIA Formula 2 Championship	MP Motorsport	28	5	4	4	11	265	**1st**
2022	Stock Car Brasil	Ipiranga Racing	1	0	0	0	0	0	NC†
2022	Formula One	Aston Martin Aramco Cognizant F1 Team	Reserve/Development driver						
2022–23	Formula E	Maserati MSG Racing	Test driver						
2023	Formula One	Aston Martin Aramco Cognizant F1 Team	Reserve/Development driver						
2023	Formula One	McLaren F1 Team	Reserve driver						
2024	European Le Mans Series - LMP2	Vector Sport	5	0	0	0	1	21	15th
2024	24 Hours of Le Mans - Hypercar	Whelen Cadillac Racing	1	0	0	0	0	N/A	15th
2024	Formula One	Aston Martin Aramco F1 Team	Test/Reserve driver						
2024–25	Formula E	Mahindra Racing	2	0	0	0	0	6	21st
2025	IMSA SportsCar Championship - GTP	Cadillac Whelen	1	0	0	0	0	248	39th
2025	24 Hours of Le Mans - Hypercar	Cadillac Whelen	1	0	0	0	0	N/A	DNF
2025	Formula One	Aston Martin Aramco F1 Team	Test/Reserve driver						
2025–26	Formula E	Andretti Formula E	17	0	1	0	1	65	14th
2026	Porsche Carrera Cup Brasil								
2026	Stock Car Pro Series	Eurofarma RC	1	0	0	0	0	40	42nd*
2026	24 Hours of Le Mans - Hypercar	Cadillac Hertz Team Jota	Reserve driver						
2026	24 Hours of Le Mans - Hypercar	Cadillac WTR	Reserve driver						
2026–27	Formula E	Andretti Formula E	0	0	0	0	0	0	TBD

^{†} As Drugovich was a guest driver, he was ineligible for points.
^{*} Season still in progress.

=== Complete ADAC Formula 4 Championship results ===
(key) (Races in bold indicate pole position) (Races in italics indicate fastest lap)

Year	Team	1	2	3	4	5	6	7	8	9	10	11	12	13	14	15	16	17	18	19	20	21	22	23	24	Pos	Points
2016	Neuhauser Racing	OSC1; 1; 12	OSC1; 2; 10	OSC1; 3; 9	SAC; 1; 17	SAC; 2; 10	SAC; 3; 28	LAU; 1; 5	LAU; 2; 8	LAU; 3; 7	OSC2; 1; 4	OSC2; 2; 6	OSC2; 3 Ret	RBR; 1; 8	RBR; 2 Ret	RBR; 3; 28	NÜR; 1 Ret	NÜR; 2; 6	NÜR; 3; 18	ZAN; 1; 9	ZAN; 2; 4	ZAN; 3; 3	HOC; 1; 26	HOC; 2; 9	HOC; 3; 14	12th	79.5
2017	Van Amersfoort Racing	**OSC1**; **1**; 21	OSC1; 2; 2	OSC1; 3; 12	LAU; 1; 4	LAU; 2; 1	LAU; 3; 1	RBR; 1; 16	RBR; 2; 1	RBR; 3; 6	OSC2; 1; 3	**OSC2**; **2**; 1	OSC2; 3; 10	NÜR; 1; 17	**NÜR**; **2**; 1	NÜR; 3; 9	SAC; 1; 7	SAC; 2 Ret	SAC; 3; 1	HOC; 1; 1	HOC; 2 Ret	HOC; 3; 5				3rd	236.5

=== Complete MRF Challenge Formula 2000 Championship results ===
(key) (Races in bold indicate pole position; races in italics indicate fastest lap)

Year	Team	1	2	3	4	5	6	7	8	9	10	11	12	13	14	15	16	DC	Points
2016–17	MRF Racing	BHR; 1; 6	BHR; 2; 5	BHR; 3; 4	BHR; 4; 8	DUB; 1; 5	DUB; 2; 1	DUB; 3; 2	DUB; 4; 2	GNO; 1; 2	GNO; 2 Ret	GNO; 3; 4	GNO; 4 Ret	CHE; 1; 7	CHE; 2; 6	CHE; 3; 5	CHE; 4; 5	4th	169
2017–18	MRF Racing	BHR; 1; 1	BHR; 2; 1	BHR; 3; 2	BHR; 4; 4	DUB; 1; 1	DUB; 2; 9	DUB; 3; 1	DUB; 4; 2	**YAS**; **1**; 1	YAS; 2; 1	**YAS**; **3**; 1	YAS; 4; 1	CHE; 1; 3	CHE; 2; 6	CHE; 3; 1	CHE; 4; 1	1st	335

=== Complete Italian F4 Championship results ===
(key) (Races in bold indicate pole position) (Races in italics indicate fastest lap)

Year	Team	1	2	3	4	5	6	7	8	9	10	11	12	13	14	15	16	17	18	19	20	21	Pos	Points
2017	Van Amersfoort Racing	MIS; 1; 23	MIS; 2; 6	MIS; 3; 4	ADR; 1	ADR; 2	ADR; 3	VLL; 1; 4	VLL; 2; 3	VLL; 3; 1	MUG; 1	MUG; 2	MUG; 3	IMO; 1	IMO; 2	IMO; 3	MUG; 1	MUG; 2	MUG; 3	MNZ; 1	MNZ; 2	MNZ; 3	NC†	0

^{†} Drugovich did not compete in the required number of rounds to be eligible for a championship position.

=== Complete FIA Formula 3 European Championship results ===
(key) (Races in bold indicate pole position) (Races in italics indicate fastest lap)

Year	Entrant	Engine	1	2	3	4	5	6	7	8	9	10	11	12	13	14	15	16	17	18	19	20	21	22	23	24	25	26	27	28	29	30	DC	Points
2017	Van Amersfoort Racing	Mercedes	SIL; 1	SIL; 2	SIL; 3	MNZ; 1	MNZ; 2	MNZ; 3	PAU; 1	PAU; 2	PAU; 3	HUN; 1	HUN; 2	HUN; 3	NOR; 1	NOR; 2	NOR; 3	SPA; 1	SPA; 2	SPA; 3	ZAN; 1	ZAN; 2	ZAN; 3	NÜR; 1	NÜR; 2	NÜR; 3	RBR; 1	RBR; 2	RBR; 3	HOC; 1; 16	HOC; 2; 16	HOC; 3; 15	NC†	0

^{†} As Drugovich was a guest driver, he was ineligible for points.

=== Complete Euroformula Open Championship results ===
(key) (Races in bold indicate pole position) (Races in italics indicate fastest lap)

Year	Team	1	2	3	4	5	6	7	8	9	10	11	12	13	14	15	16	DC	Points
2017	RP Motorsport	EST; 1	EST; 2	SPA; 1	SPA; 2	LEC; 1	LEC; 2	HUN; 1	HUN; 2	SIL; 1	SIL; 2	MNZ; 1	MNZ; 2	JER; 1	JER; 2	**CAT**; **1**; 6	CAT; 2; 1	NC†	0
2018	RP Motorsport	**EST**; **1**; 1	EST; 2; 2	**LEC**; **1**; 1	**LEC**; **2**; 1	**SPA**; **1**; 1	**SPA**; **2**; 1	**HUN**; **1**; 1	HUN; 2; 1	**SIL**; **1**; 1	SIL; 2; 2	MNZ; 1; 1	**MNZ**; **2**; 1	**JER**; **1**; 1	**JER**; **2**; 1	CAT; 1; 1	CAT; 2; 1	1st	405

^{†} As Drugovich was a guest driver, he was ineligible for points.

=== Complete FIA Formula 3 Championship results ===
(key) (Races in bold indicate pole position; races in italics indicate points for the fastest lap of top ten finishers)

Year	Entrant	1	2	3	4	5	6	7	8	9	10	11	12	13	14	15	16	DC	Points
2019	Carlin Buzz Racing	CAT; FEA; 11	CAT; SPR; 10	LEC; FEA; 19	LEC; SPR; 10	RBR; FEA; 12	RBR; SPR; 14	SIL; FEA; 13	SIL; SPR; 10	HUN; FEA; 6	HUN; SPR; Ret	SPA; FEA; 18	SPA; SPR; 9	MNZ; FEA; 16	MNZ; SPR; 12	SOC; FEA; 25	SOC; SPR; 15	16th	8

=== Complete Macau Grand Prix results ===
Year	Team	Car	Qualifying	Quali Race	Main race
2019	(United Kingdom) Carlin Buzz Racing	Dallara F3 2019	16th	DNF	24th

=== Complete FIA Formula 2 Championship results ===
(key) (Races in bold indicate pole position) (Races in italics indicate points for the fastest lap of top ten finishers)

Year	Entrant	1	2	3	4	5	6	7	8	9	10	11	12	13	14	15	16	17	18	19	20	21	22	23	24	25	26	27	28	DC	Points
2020	MP Motorsport	RBR; FEA; 8	RBR; SPR; 1	RBR; FEA; 13	RBR; SPR; 13	HUN; FEA; 5	HUN; SPR; 16	**SIL**; **FEA**; 7	SIL; SPR; 6	SIL; FEA; 10	SIL; SPR; 12	CAT; FEA; 7	CAT; SPR; 1	SPA; FEA; DSQ	SPA; SPR; 13	MNZ; FEA; 16	MNZ; SPR; Ret	MUG; FEA; 4	MUG; SPR; 15	SOC; FEA; Ret	SOC; SPR; 20	BHR; FEA; 1	BHR; SPR; 8	BHR; FEA; 3	BHR; SPR; 8					9th	121
2021	UNI-Virtuosi Racing	BHR; SP1; 16	BHR; SP2; 14	BHR; FEA; 9	MCO; SP1; 2	MCO; SP2; 14	MCO; FEA; 3	BAK; SP1; 14	BAK; SP2; 10	BAK; FEA; 4	SIL; SP1; 4	SIL; SP2; 7	SIL; FEA; 6	MNZ; SP1; Ret	MNZ; SP2; 17	MNZ; FEA; 12	SOC; SP1; DNS	SOC; SP2; C	SOC; FEA; DNS	JED; SP1; 4	JED; SP2; 10	JED; FEA; 5‡	YMC; SP1; 2	YMC; SP2; 5	YMC; FEA; 3					8th	105
2022	MP Motorsport	BHR; SPR; 5	BHR; FEA; 6	JED; SPR; 3	**JED**; **FEA**; 1	IMO; SPR; 5	IMO; FEA; 10	CAT; SPR; 1	CAT; FEA; 1	MCO; SPR; Ret	**MCO**; **FEA**; 1	BAK; SPR; 5	BAK; FEA; 3	SIL; SPR; 5	SIL; FEA; 4	RBR; SPR; 4	RBR; FEA; 11	LEC; SPR; 3	LEC; FEA; 4	HUN; SPR; 4	HUN; FEA; 9	SPA; SPR; 4	**SPA**; **FEA**; 2	ZAN; SPR; 10	**ZAN**; **FEA**; 1	MNZ; SPR; Ret	MNZ; FEA; 6	YMC; SPR; 3	YMC; FEA; 2	1st	265

^{‡} Half points awarded as less than 75% of race distance was completed.

=== Complete Stock Car Brasil results ===
(key) (Races in bold indicate pole position) (Races in italics indicate fastest lap)

Year	Team	Car	1	2	3	4	5	6	7	8	9	10	11	12	13	14	15	16	17	18	19	20	21	22	23	Rank	Points
2022	Ipiranga Racing	Toyota Corolla	INT; 1 Ret	GOI; 1	GOI; 2	RIO; 1	RIO; 2	VCA; 1	VCA; 2	BRA; 1	BRA; 2	BRA; 1	BRA; 2	INT; 1	INT; 2	SCZ; 1	SCZ; 2	VCA; 1	VCA; 2	GOI; 1	GOI; 2	GOI; 1	GOI; 2	BRA; 1	BRA; 2	NC†	0†
2026	Eurofarma RC	Mitsubishi Eclipse Cross	CRS; 1	CRS; 2	CAS; 1	CAS; 2	INT; 1	INT; 2	GOI; 1	GOI; 2	CUI; 1	CUI; 2	VCA; 1	VCA; 2	SCZ; 1	SCZ; 2	CRS; 1	CRS; 2	BRA; 1; 10	CAS; 1	CAS; 2	VEL; 1	VEL; 2	INT; 1	INT; 2	42nd*	40*

^{†} As Drugovich was a guest driver, he was ineligible for points.

=== Complete Formula One participations ===
(key) (Races in bold indicate pole position) (Races in italics indicate fastest lap)

Year	Entrant	Chassis	Engine	1	2	3	4	5	6	7	8	9	10	11	12	13	14	15	16	17	18	19	20	21	22	23	24	WDC	Points
2022	Aston Martin Aramco Cognizant F1 Team	Aston Martin AMR22	Mercedes AMG F1 M13 E Performance V6 t	BHR	SAU	AUS	EMI	MIA	ESP	MON	AZE	CAN	GBR	AUT	FRA	HUN	BEL	NED	ITA	SIN	JPN	USA	MXC	SAP	ABU; TD			–	–
2023	Aston Martin Aramco Cognizant F1 Team	Aston Martin AMR23	Mercedes AMG F1 M14 E Performance V6 t	BHR	SAU	AUS	AZE	MIA	MON	ESP	CAN	AUT	GBR	HUN	BEL	NED	ITA; TD	SIN	JPN	QAT	USA	MXC	SAP	LVG	ABU; TD			–	–
2024	Aston Martin Aramco F1 Team	Aston Martin AMR24	Mercedes AMG F1 M15 E Performance V6 t	BHR	SAU	AUS	JPN	CHN	MIA	EMI	MON	CAN	ESP	AUT	GBR	HUN	BEL	NED	ITA	AZE	SIN	USA	MXC; TD	SAP	LVG	QAT	ABU; TD	–	–
2025	Aston Martin Aramco F1 Team	Aston Martin AMR25	Mercedes AMG F1 M16 E Performance V6 t	AUS	CHN	JPN	BHR; TD	SAU	MIA	EMI	MON	ESP	CAN	AUT	GBR	BEL	HUN; TD	NED	ITA	AZE	SIN	USA	MXC	SAP	LVG	QAT	ABU	–	–

=== American open-wheel racing results ===
==== Pro Mazda Championship ====
Year	Team	1	2	3	4	5	6	7	8	9	10	11	12	13	14	15	16	Rank	Points
2018	RP Motorsport	STP	STP	BAR	BAR	IMS	IMS	LOR	ROA	ROA	TOR	TOR	MOH; 7	MOH; 5	GMP	POR	POR	20th	31

=== Complete European Le Mans Series results ===
Year	Entrant	Class	Chassis	Engine	1	2	3	4	5	6	Rank	Points
2024	Vector Sport	LMP2	Oreca 07	Gibson GK428 4.2 L V8	CAT; 10	LEC; 10	IMO; 3	SPA; 8	MUG	ALG; Ret	15th	21

=== Complete 24 Hours of Le Mans results ===
Year	Team	Co-Drivers	Car	Class	Laps	Pos.	Class Pos.
2024	(United States) Whelen Cadillac Racing	(United Kingdom) Jack Aitken (Brazil) Pipo Derani	Cadillac V-Series.R	Hypercar	280	29th	15th
2025	(United States) Cadillac Whelen	(United Kingdom) Jack Aitken (Denmark) Frederik Vesti	Cadillac V-Series.R	Hypercar	247	DNF	DNF

=== Complete IMSA SportsCar Championship results ===
(key) (Races in bold indicate pole position; races in italics indicate fastest lap)

Year	Entrant	Class	Make	Engine	1	2	3	4	5	6	7	8	9	Rank	Points
2025	Cadillac Whelen	GTP	Cadillac V-Series.R	Cadillac LMC55R 5.5 L V8	DAY; 9	SEB	LBH	LGA	DET	WGL	ELK	IMS	PET	39th	248

=== Complete Formula E results ===
(key) (Races in bold indicate pole position; races in italics indicate fastest lap)

Year	Team	Chassis	Powertrain	1	2	3	4	5	6	7	8	9	10	11	12	13	14	15	16	17	Pos	Points
2024–25	Mahindra Racing	Formula E Gen3 Evo	Mahindra M11Electro	SAO	MEX	JED	JED	MIA	MCO	MCO	TKO	TKO	SHA	SHA	JAK	BER; 17	BER; 7	LDN	LDN		21st	6
2025–26	Andretti Formula E	Formula E Gen3 Evo	Porsche 99X Electric	SAO; 12	MEX; 15	MIA; 18	JED; 15	JED; 12	MAD; 15	BER; 13	BER; 9	MCO; 4	MCO; 2	SAN; 5	SHA; 4	**SHA**; 6	TKO; 13	TKO; 16	LDN; 16	LDN; 13	14th	65

Sporting positions
Preceded by Harrison Newey	MRF Challenge Formula 2000; Champion; 2017–18	Succeeded by Jamie Chadwick
Preceded by Harrison Scott	Euroformula Open Championship; Champion; 2018	Succeeded by Marino Sato
Preceded by Devlin DeFrancesco	Spanish Formula 3 Championship; Champion; 2018	Succeeded by None
Preceded by Oscar Piastri	FIA Formula 2 Championship; Champion; 2022	Succeeded by Theo Pourchaire
