= 2020 Spielberg Formula 3 round =

Motor racing competition

(Austria) 2020 Red Rull Ring Formula 3 round
Round details
- Round 1 of 9 in the 2020 FIA Formula 3 Championship.
- Layout of the Red Bull Ring
- Location: Red Bull Ring; Spielberg, Styria, Austria
- Course: Permanent racing facility 4.326 km (2.690 mi)

Feature Race
- Date: 4 July 2020
- Laps: 24
Pole position
Driver	(Spain) Sebastián Fernández	ART Grand Prix
Time	1:19.429	
Podium
First	(Australia) Oscar Piastri	Prema Racing
Second	(United States) Logan Sargeant	Prema Racing
Third	(Australia) Alex Peroni	Campos Racing
Fastest lap
Driver	(Australia) Alex Peroni	Campos Racing
- Time: 1:21.602 (on lap 19)

Sprint Race
- Date: 5 July 2020
- Laps: 24
Podium
First	(New Zealand) Liam Lawson	Hitech Grand Prix
Second	(Netherlands) Richard Verschoor	MP Motorsport
Third	(France) Clément Novalak	Carlin Buzz Racing
Fastest lap
Driver	(Australia) Oscar Piastri	Prema Racing
- Time: 1:21.513 (on lap 4)

The 2020 Red Bull Ring FIA Formula 3 round was a motor racing event held on 4 and 5 July 2020 at the Red Bull Ring in Austria. It is the first round of the 2020 FIA Formula 3 Championship, and ran in support of the 2020 Austrian Grand Prix.

== Entries ==
17 drivers made their full-time FIA Formula 3 Championship debut, with only Jenzer driver Federico Malvestiti having had experience in the category before. The other rookies were Formula Renault Eurocup champion Oscar Piastri and Formula Regional European champion Frederik Vesti at Prema Racing, Italian F4 champion Dennis Hauger at Hitech Grand Prix, ADAC F4 Championship winner Théo Pourchaire and Aleksandr Smolyar at ART Grand Prix, Olli Caldwell at Trident, Enzo Fittipaldi and Jack Doohan at HWA Racelab, Lukas Dunner at MP Motorsport, Calan Williams and F4 UAE champion Matteo Nannini, Roman Staněk, David Schumacher and 2020 Toyota Racing Series winner Igor Fraga at Charouz, BRDC F3 champion Clément Novalak, Enaam Ahmed and Cameron Das at Carlin Buzz Racing, and Sophia Flörsch at Campos Racing. Logan Sargeant switched from Carlin to Prema, Max Fewtrell and Liam Lawson moved to Hitech from ART Grand Prix and MP Motorsport respectively, Sebastián Fernández went from Campos to ART, meanwhile Lirim Zendeli and David Beckmann came to Trident from Charouz and ART respectively, and Bent Viscaal made a move to MP Motorsport from HWA. The other drivers, namely Jake Hughes (HWA), Richard Verschoor (MP), Alex Peroni and Alessio Deledda (both Campos) returned to their previous year's team respectively.

== Classification ==
=== Qualifying ===
Pos.	No.	Driver	Team	Time/Gap	Grid
1	9	(Spain) Sebastian Fernández	ART Grand Prix	1:19.429	1
2	10	(Germany) Lirim Zendeli	Trident	+0.016	2
3	1	(Australia) Oscar Piastri	Prema Racing	+0.135	3
4	3	(United States) Logan Sargeant	Prema Racing	+0.166	4
5	15	(United Kingdom) Jake Hughes	HWA Racelab	+0.189	5
6	2	(Denmark) Frederik Vesti	Prema Racing	+0.247	6
7	11	(Germany) David Beckmann	Trident	+0.264	7
8	29	(Australia) Alex Peroni	Campos Racing	+0.280	8
9	17	(Netherlands) Richard Verschoor	MP Motorsport	+0.380	9
10	23	(Czech Republic) Roman Staněk	Charouz Racing System	+0.397	10
11	8	(Russia) Aleksandr Smolyar	ART Grand Prix	+0.599	11
12	5	(New Zealand) Liam Lawson	Hitech Grand Prix	+0.626	12
13	18	(Netherlands) Bent Viscaal	MP Motorsport	+0.679	13
14	26	(France) Clément Novalak	Carlin Buzz Racing	+0.682	14
15	16	(Australia) Jack Doohan	HWA Racelab	+0.712	15
16	6	(Norway) Dennis Hauger	Hitech Grand Prix	+0.761	16
17	4	(United Kingdom) Max Fewtrell	Hitech Grand Prix	+0.771	17
18	22	(Italy) Matteo Nannini	Jenzer Motorsport	+0.799	18
19	21	(Italy) Federico Malvestiti	Jenzer Motorsport	+0.895	19
20	7	(France) Théo Pourchaire	ART Grand Prix	+0.909	20
21	28	(United States) Cameron Das	Carlin Buzz Racing	+0.915	21
22	19	(Austria) Lukas Dunner	MP Motorsport	+0.924	22
23	20	(Australia) Calan Williams	Jenzer Motorsport	+1.126	23
24	25	(Germany) David Schumacher	Charouz Racing System	+1.378	24
25	12	(United Kingdom) Olli Caldwell	Trident	+1.417	25
26	27	(United Kingdom) Enaam Ahmed	Carlin Buzz Racing	+1.429	26
27	30	(Italy) Alessio Deledda	Campos Racing	+1.804	27
28	31	(Germany) Sophia Flörsch	Campos Racing	+1.882	28
29	14	(Brazil) Enzo Fittipaldi	HWA Racelab	+1.901	29
30	24	(Brazil) Igor Fraga	Charouz Racing System	+3.631	30

=== Feature Race ===
Pos.	No.	Driver	Team	Laps	Time/Retired	Grid	Pts.
1	1	(Australia) Oscar Piastri	Prema Racing	24	32:53.331	3	25
2	3	(United States) Logan Sargeant	Prema Racing	24	+1.671	4	18
3	29	(Australia) Alex Peroni	Campos Racing	24	+3.017	8	15 (2)
4	2	(Denmark) Frederik Vesti	Prema Racing	24	+4.002	6	12
5	10	(Germany) Lirim Zendeli	Trident	24	+7.496	2	10
6	5	(New Zealand) Liam Lawson	Hitech Grand Prix	24	+10.818	12	8
7	11	(Germany) David Beckmann	Trident	24	+12.862	7	6
8	17	(Netherlands) Richard Verschoor	MP Motorsport	24	+13.800	9	4
9	8	(Russia) Aleksandr Smolyar	ART Grand Prix	24	+14.194	11	2
10	26	(France) Clément Novalak	Carlin Buzz Racing	24	+14.558	14	1
11	18	(Netherlands) Bent Viscaal	MP Motorsport	24	+15.477	13	
12	4	(United Kingdom) Max Fewtrell	Hitech Grand Prix	24	+22.398	17	
13	7	(France) Théo Pourchaire	ART Grand Prix	24	+22.921	20	
14	16	(Australia) Jack Doohan	HWA Racelab	24	+25.218	15	
15	6	(Norway) Dennis Hauger	Hitech Grand Prix	24	+26.634	16	
16	24	(Brazil) Igor Fraga	Charouz Racing System	24	+27.131	30	
17	23	(Czech Republic) Roman Staněk	Charouz Racing System	24	+27.587	10	
18	14	(Brazil) Enzo Fittipaldi	HWA Racelab	24	+27.874	29	
19	21	(Italy) Federico Malvestiti	Jenzer Motorsport	24	+29.229	19	
20	12	(United Kingdom) Olli Caldwell	Trident	24	+29.599	25	
21	20	(Australia) Calan Williams	Jenzer Motorsport	24	+29.930	23	
22	28	(United States) Cameron Das	Carlin Buzz Racing	24	+30.365	21	
23	27	(United Kingdom) Enaam Ahmed	Carlin Buzz Racing	24	+30.868	26	
24	19	(Austria) Lukas Dunner	MP Motorsport	24	+31.123	22	
25	25	(Germany) David Schumacher	Charouz Racing System	24	+35.204	24	
26	31	(Germany) Sophia Flörsch	Campos Racing	24	+35.838	28	
27	22	(Italy) Matteo Nannini	Jenzer Motorsport	24	+36.354	18	
28	15	(United Kingdom) Jake Hughes	HWA Racelab	24	+37.545	PL	
29	30	(Italy) Alessio Deledda	Campos Racing	23	+1 lap	27	
DNF	9	(Spain) Sebastián Fernández	ART Grand Prix	1	Collision damage	1	(4)
Fastest lap set by (Australia) Alex Peroni: 1:21.602 (lap 19)

=== Sprint Race ===
Pos.	No.	Driver	Team	Laps	Time/Retired	Grid	Pts.
1	5	(New Zealand) Liam Lawson	Hitech Grand Prix	24	37:01.698	5	15
2	17	(Netherlands) Richard Verschoor	MP Motorsport	24	+0.417	3	12
3	26	(France) Clément Novalak	Carlin Buzz Racing	24	+1.302	1	10
4	11	(Germany) David Beckmann	Trident	24	+1.639	4	8
5	10	(Germany) Lirim Zendeli	Trident	24	+2.232	6	6
6	2	(Denmark) Frederik Vesti	Prema Racing	24	+2.836	7	5
7	8	(Russia) Aleksandr Smolyar	ART Grand Prix	24	+3.090	2	4
8	1	(Australia) Oscar Piastri	Prema Racing	24	+3.451	10	3 (2)
9	14	(Brazil) Enzo Fittipaldi	HWA Racelab	24	+4.098	18	2
10	4	(United Kingdom) Max Fewtrell	Hitech Grand Prix	24	+4.580	12	1
11	18	(Netherlands) Bent Viscaal	MP Motorsport	24	+4.975	11	
12	15	(United Kingdom) Jake Hughes	HWA Racelab	24	+5.437	28	
13	9	(Spain) Sebastián Fernández	ART Grand Prix	24	+6.206	30	
14	19	(Austria) Lukas Dunner	MP Motorsport	24	+7.109	24	
15	25	(Germany) David Schumacher	Charouz Racing System	24	+8.499	25	
16	31	(Germany) Sophia Flörsch	Campos Racing	24	+9.159	26	
17	20	(Australia) Calan Williams	Jenzer Motorsport	24	+9.491	21	
18	22	(Italy) Matteo Nannini	Jenzer Motorsport	24	+9.864	22	
19	12	(United Kingdom) Olli Caldwell	Trident	24	+10.949	20	
20	30	(Italy) Alessio Deledda	Campos Racing	24	+11.388	29	
21	21	(Italy) Federico Malvestiti	Jenzer Motorsport	24	+12.050	19	
22	6	(Norway) Dennis Hauger	Hitech Grand Prix	24	+12.445	15	
23	23	(Czech Republic) Roman Staněk	Charouz Racing System	24	+13.189	17	
24	27	(United Kingdom) Enaam Ahmed	Carlin Buzz Racing	24	+18.137	23	
25	24	(Brazil) Igor Fraga	Charouz Racing System	24	+30.838	16	
26	7	(France) Théo Pourchaire	ART Grand Prix	24	+40.237	13	
27	3	(United States) Logan Sargeant	Prema Racing	23	+1 lap	9	
NC	16	(Australia) Jack Doohan	HWA Racelab	16	+8 laps	14	
DNF	29	(Australia) Alex Peroni	Campos Racing	10	Mechanical	8	
DNF	28	(United States) Cameron Das	Carlin Buzz Racing	5	Mechanical	22	
Fastest lap set by (Australia) Oscar Piastri: 1:21.513 (lap 4)

== Standings after the event ==
Drivers' Championship standings

Pos	Driver	Points
1	(Australia) Oscar Piastri	30
2	(New Zealand) Liam Lawson	23
3	(United States) Logan Sargeant	18
4	(Australia) Alex Peroni	17
5	(Denmark) Frederik Vesti	17

Teams' Championship standings

Pos	Team	Points
1	(Italy) Prema Racing	65
2	(Italy) Trident	35
3	(United Kingdom) Hitech Grand Prix	24
4	(Spain) Campos Racing	17
5	(Netherlands) MP Motorsport	16

- Note: Only the top five positions are included for both sets of standings.

== See also ==
- 2020 Austrian Grand Prix
- 2020 Red Bull Ring FIA Formula 2 round

Previous round: 2019 Sochi Formula 3 round	FIA Formula 3 Championship; 2020 season	Next round: 2020 2nd Spielberg Formula 3 round
Previous round: 2019 Spielberg Formula 3 round	Spielberg Formula 3 round	Next round: 2020 2nd Spielberg Formula 3 round
