= Frederik Vesti =

Danish racing driver (born 2002)

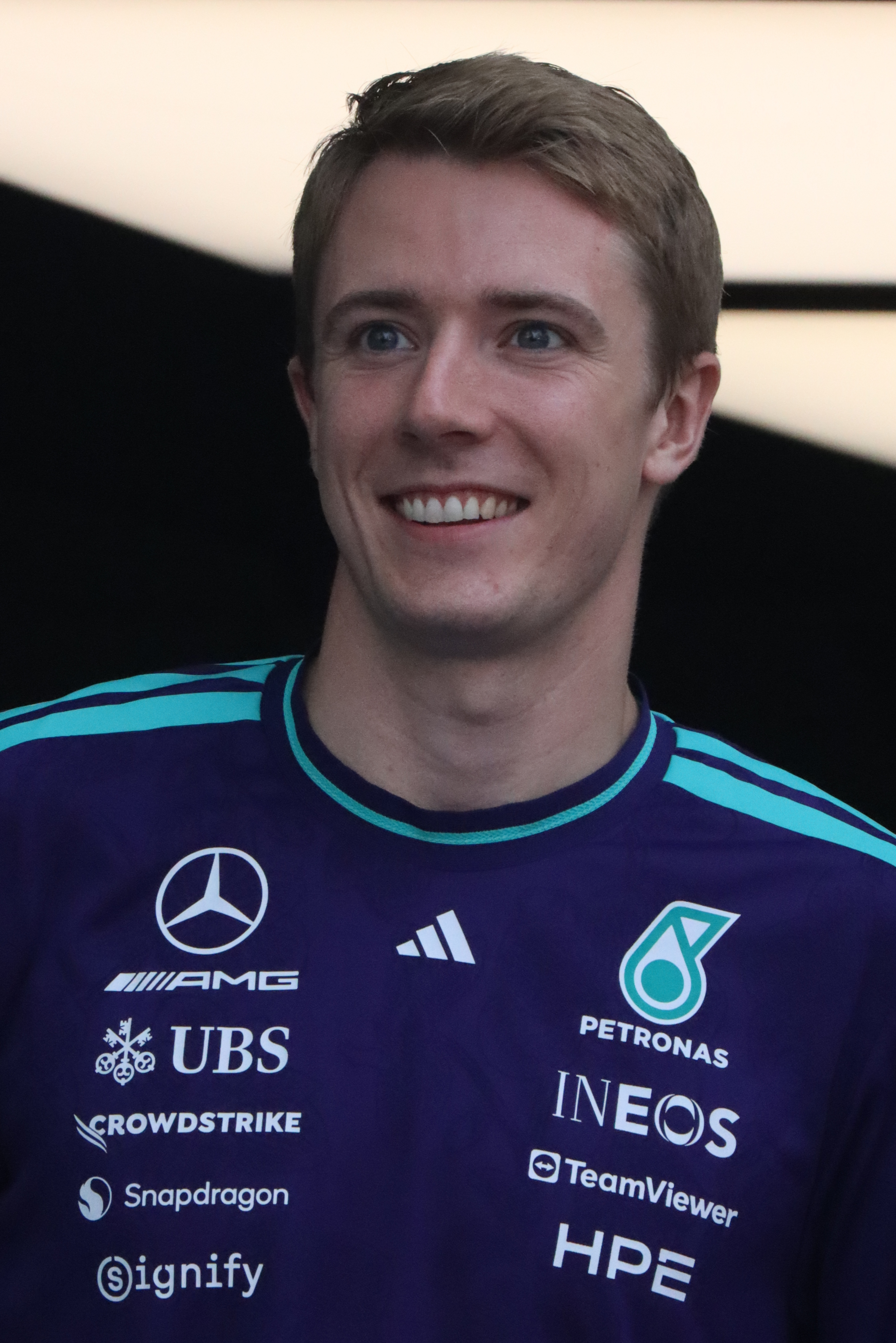
- Vesti in 2026
- Nationality: (Denmark) Danish
- Born: Frederik Vesti Stamm; 13 January 2002 (age 24) Vejle, Denmark

IMSA SportsCar Championship career
- Debut season: 2024
- Current team: Cadillac Whelen
- Categorisation: FIA Platinum
- Car number: 31
- Former teams: Tower Motorsports
- Starts: 13
- Wins: 3
- Podiums: 6
- Poles: 3
- Fastest laps: 3
- Best finish: 13th in 2025

24 Hours of Le Mans career
- Years: 2024–2025
- Teams: Cadillac Whelen, Cool Racing
- Best finish: 24th (2024)
- Class wins: 0

Previous series
- 2024; 2022–2023; 2020–2021; 2019; 2018; 2018; 2017–2018; 2017; 2017; 2016: ELMS; FIA Formula 2; FIA Formula 3; FR European; FIA F3 European; Italian F4; ADAC F4; F4 United States; F4 Danish; FFord Denmark

Championship titles
- 2019: FR European

Frederik Vesti Stamm (Danish pronunciation: [fʁεðʁεɡ̊ ˈvεsti]; born 13 January 2002) is a Danish racing driver, who competes in the IMSA SportsCar Championship for Cadillac Whelen and serves as a reserve driver in Formula One for Mercedes and Alpine.

Vesti was the 2023 Formula 2 runner-up, driving for Prema Racing. He was the inaugural champion of the Formula Regional European Championship and a four-time FIA Formula 3 race winner where he came fourth in 2020 and 2021. He currently holds the record for the most points scored (284.5) in Formula 3.

== Junior racing career ==
=== Karting ===
Vesti starting karting competitively in 2012, at the age of ten. He went on to win many Danish karting competitions, including the Danish championship in 2014 for the KFJ category. He raced in the 2015 edition of the Karting World Championship, where he ended 69th. Vesti continued karting until 2016.

=== Lower formulae ===
==== 2016 ====
Vesti started his career at the age of fourteen in Danish Formula Ford, in which he managed to finish fourth in the championship.

==== 2017 ====
In 2017, Vesti competed in the German and Danish Formula 4 Championships. Despite missing two events of the Danish Championship, the Danish driver managed to finish second in his debut F4 season, finishing all races on the podium and helping his team, Vesti Motorsport, to win the team championship. In the German championship, Vesti took his first podium by taking second in the second round at Lausitzring. Two rounds later, he would claim his first and only win of the season. Vesti took another podium en route to finishing seventh in the standings. Vesti also made a one-off appearance in the Formula 4 United States Championship during the final round.

==== 2018 ====
In 2018, Vesti would yet again compete in the German F4 Championship with Van Amersfoort Racing. After starting the season with two podiums in the opening two rounds, he claimed his maiden win during the second Hockenheimring round. His second win came during the next round at the Nürburgring. Vesti eventually ended fourth in the standings, collecting six other podiums along with his two wins. Vesti also participated in one round at Circuit Paul Ricard during the Italian F4 Championship with VAR. Vesti claimed two wins in the three races, which placed him tenth in the championship. Vesti also participated in the final round of the European Formula 3 Championship. He made his debut in the Macau Grand Prix, where he finished 15th.

=== Formula Regional European Championship ===
Prema Powerteam signed Vesti to compete in the inaugural Formula Regional European Championship. Vesti dominated the championship, claiming 13 victories, with six of them being achieved back-to-back, and a total of 20 podium finishes. Vesti won the championship with 467 points, 131 in front of Ferrari Academy driver and teammate Enzo Fittipaldi. They, along with British driver Olli Caldwell, helped Prema to win the team championship. At the end of the season, Vesti again raced in the Macau Grand Prix, but this time was called up to replace an injured Jehan Daruvala at Prema Powerteam. He ended the race in tenth place. In an article by Motorsport.com, he was ranked 13th in their top 20 junior single-seater drivers of 2019.

=== FIA Formula 3 Championship ===
==== 2020 ====
Vesti tested for Prema Racing during the 2019 post-season test. At the start of January 2020, Vesti was announced to continue driving for Prema, progressing to the FIA Formula 3 Championship, partnering with Formula Renault Eurocup champion Oscar Piastri and American driver Logan Sargeant. Vesti's first weekend at the Red Bull Ring was decent, scoring a fourth and sixth place. During the second Red Bull Ring round, he stormed to his first pole position in the championship. He controlled the race and won perfectly, despite it being cut short due to treacherous weather conditions. The next day, he finished in eighth place. Vesti had a torrid Budapest round; he was caught up in a collision during Race 1 after qualifying fourth. In Race 2, he worked his way up to 19th before damaging his suspension in a collision with Jack Doohan, putting Vesti into retirement.

In the first Silverstone round, Vesti had a quiet weekend, scoring two fifth places. He scored fourth in qualifying for the second Silverstone round, and finished the races in fourth and eighth. Vesti had another weekend to forget in Barcelona, qualifying poorly in 15th. He barely progressed up the field in Race 1 before retiring with a mechanical issue on lap 9. He could only improve to 21st place in Race 2.

In Spa-Francorchamps, Vesti ended sixth in Race 1. However, starting fifth in Race 2, Vesti worked his way to second place, taking his first podium since the second round. Vesti qualified sixth in Monza but was demoted to start ninth for impeding Jake Hughes in qualifying. He made a brilliant charge in Race 1, overtaking Théo Pourchaire on the third last lap and claiming his second win overall whilst helping Prema become the teams' champions. In Race 2, he had a race to forget. Despite climbing to third by lap 9, his effort would be undone as he touched teammate Sargeant, damaging Vesti's front wing and taking both out of the race. In Mugello during Race 1, he remained in third for the first 15 laps but passed Lirim Zendeli and Hughes within the next three. He battled with Hughes in the dying laps but managed to defend and secure his third win. In Race 2, Vesti ended in ninth place. His strong end to the season meant Vesti leaped to fourth in the standings with 146.5 points, 17.5 behind champion Piastri.

==== 2021 ====
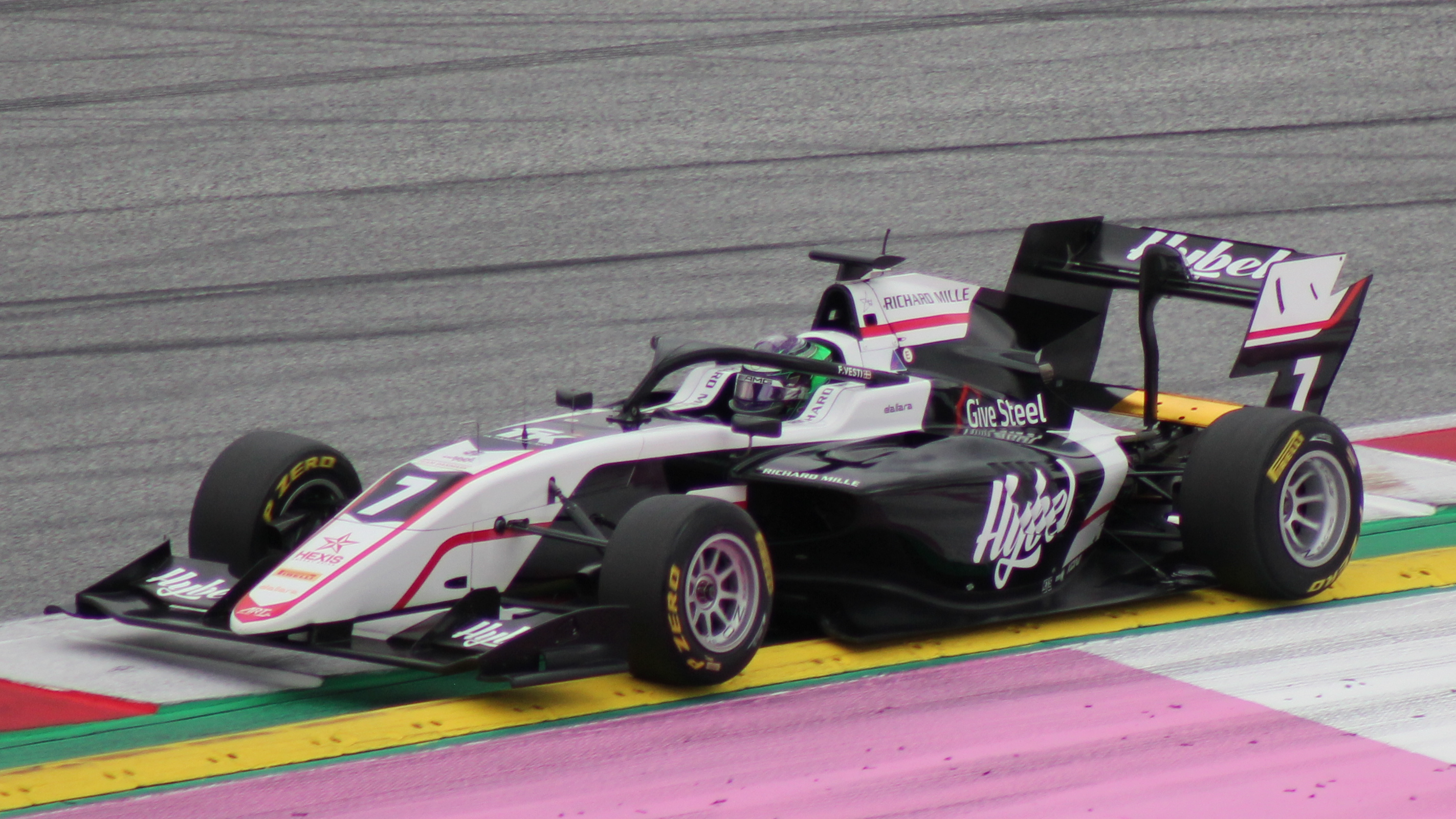
Vesti at the Red Bull Ring in 2021

Vesti would sign for ART Grand Prix to race in Formula 3 alongside Russian Aleksandr Smolyar and American Juan Manuel Correa. After qualifying fifth during the first round in Barcelona, he started the season with seventh in Race 1. Vesti took his first podium of the season with a third place, gaining two places on the penultimate lap after Dennis Hauger and Matteo Nannini collided. In Race 3, Vesti had a slow start to the race, but recovered to finish seventh. In Paul Ricard, Vesti claimed his second pole overall. He had an underwhelming Race 1 and Race 2, taking only one point from the latter race. Vesti was passed by Hauger at the start of Race 3, and later struggled in the wet, losing positions to finish sixth. At the Red Bull Ring, Vesti would qualify second. In Race 1, Vesti stalled at the start but managed to progress to 13th, later being promoted to seventh due to multiple penalties. Vesti would finish second in the second race, inheriting a position on the penultimate lap when Victor Martins slowed. However, in Race 3, he beat out polesitter Hauger early on and defended for his only win of the year.

In Budapest, he qualified seventh but was penalised three places for Race 1 due to driving unnecessarily slowly. Race 1 was one to forget, as a hydraulic leak saw him retire entering lap 16. After not scoring points in Race 2, he bounced back with seventh place in the next race. He had a quiet Spa-Francorchamps round, taking fourth and two sixth places. In Zandvoort, he qualified poorly in 13th place, but improved to ninth in the first race. In Race 2, at which point he was mathematically out of the running for the title, Vesti returned to the podium in third place. He improved to eighth in the final race. Vesti qualified fourth in the Russia season finale, and ended eighth in the first race. Vesti finished second in the final race of the season at Sochi after passing Clément Novalak late on. He thus overhauled Victor Martins to repeat his previous year's championship finish of fourth place, claiming one pole and a win each, and four more podiums.

=== FIA Formula 2 Championship ===
==== 2022: Rookie season ====
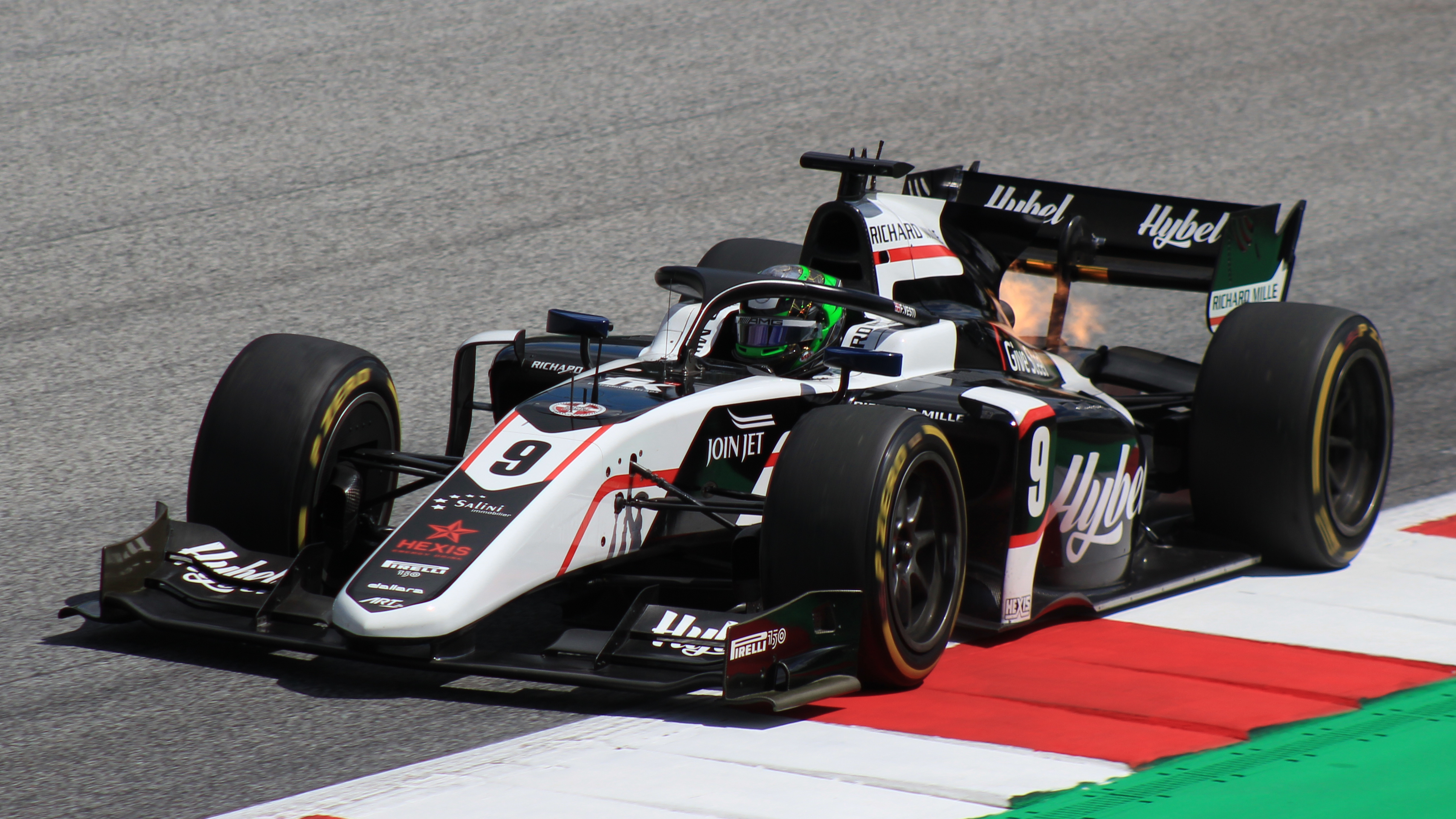
Vesti driving for ART Grand Prix during the 2022 Spielberg Formula 2 round.

Vesti got his first taste of Formula 2 machinery when he participated in the post-season test in 2021 with ART Grand Prix alongside former F3 title rival Théo Pourchaire. On 21 January 2022, ART Grand Prix announced that Vesti would join the team for the 2022 season alongside Pourchaire. Before the season, Vesti stated that he was "hoping to translate points into podiums" after his consistent F3 season. Vesti started his season poorly, failing to score points during the first two rounds, compounded by poor qualifying. During the third round in Imola, in the feature race, Vesti started on the soft tyres, which allowed him to pit during an early safety car. With many rivals ahead on the alternate strategy, Vesti was able to claim his first points of the year by finishing sixth, after which he stated that he needed to "work on qualifying". In Barcelona, he banished his qualifying woes to secure third. He finished seventh in the sprint race and ended up holding his position during the feature race, thus scoring his maiden podium in the category.

Vesti had a point-less weekend in Monaco, as another poor qualifying was caused by a red flag brought out by a rival. In Baku, Vesti qualified eighth. Late in the race, he seized on a mistake from Jehan Daruvala during the safety car restart to take the lead in the closing laps and claim his maiden Formula 2 victory. Vesti stalled at the start of the feature race, but due to many rivals being involved in incidents, he stayed clean to secure seventh place. He qualified second on the front row in Silverstone, and finished sixth after a tight battle with Felipe Drugovich. In the feature race, he had a terrible start and dropped four positions on the first lap. Still, he would recover to fifth, despite losing fourth to Drugovich on the last lap. Vesti scored his first pole position of the season at the Red Bull Ring, vanquishing his previous qualifying struggles. He finished 12th in the sprint race, as a track limit penalty deprived him of points. Vesti fitted wet tyres on a drying track and the strategy failed to work, which resulted in him falling down to 14th by the end of the race.

Vesti qualified third in Paul Ricard, his third top-three qualifying in a row. In the sprint race, he ended fifth after multiple penalties were applied post-race. In the feature race, he lost a position to Jack Doohan at the start but regained third place after the Australian spun whilst fighting teammate Pourchaire, adding another podium. In Budapest, Vesti ended the sprint race fifth and made an overtaking masterclass on the alternate strategy during the later part of the race, although an early penalty costed him a podium. Heading into the summer break, Vesti stood sixth in the standings with 91 points.

However, Vesti's second half of his season would be poor, as he failed to score points in the Spa-Francorchamps and Zandvoort rounds, all due to more poor qualifying. In Monza, Vesti started on reverse pole for the sprint race by qualifying tenth. However, he was beaten by Jüri Vips during the lap 4 safety car restart, and was forced to settle for second place. In the feature race, a timely pit stop saw Vesti in a net position fourth place following the lap 11 safety car restart. He would gain positions when Marcus Armstrong had to serve a penalty, and Vesti also passed Ayumu Iwasa, earning him another second place as he would run out of time to catch winner Jehan Daruvala. He failed to score points during the Yas Marina finale. Vesti ended up ninth in the championship with 117 points, helping ART to third in the teams' standings whilst scoring one win, one pole, and five podiums.

==== 2023: Title challenge and runner-up finish ====
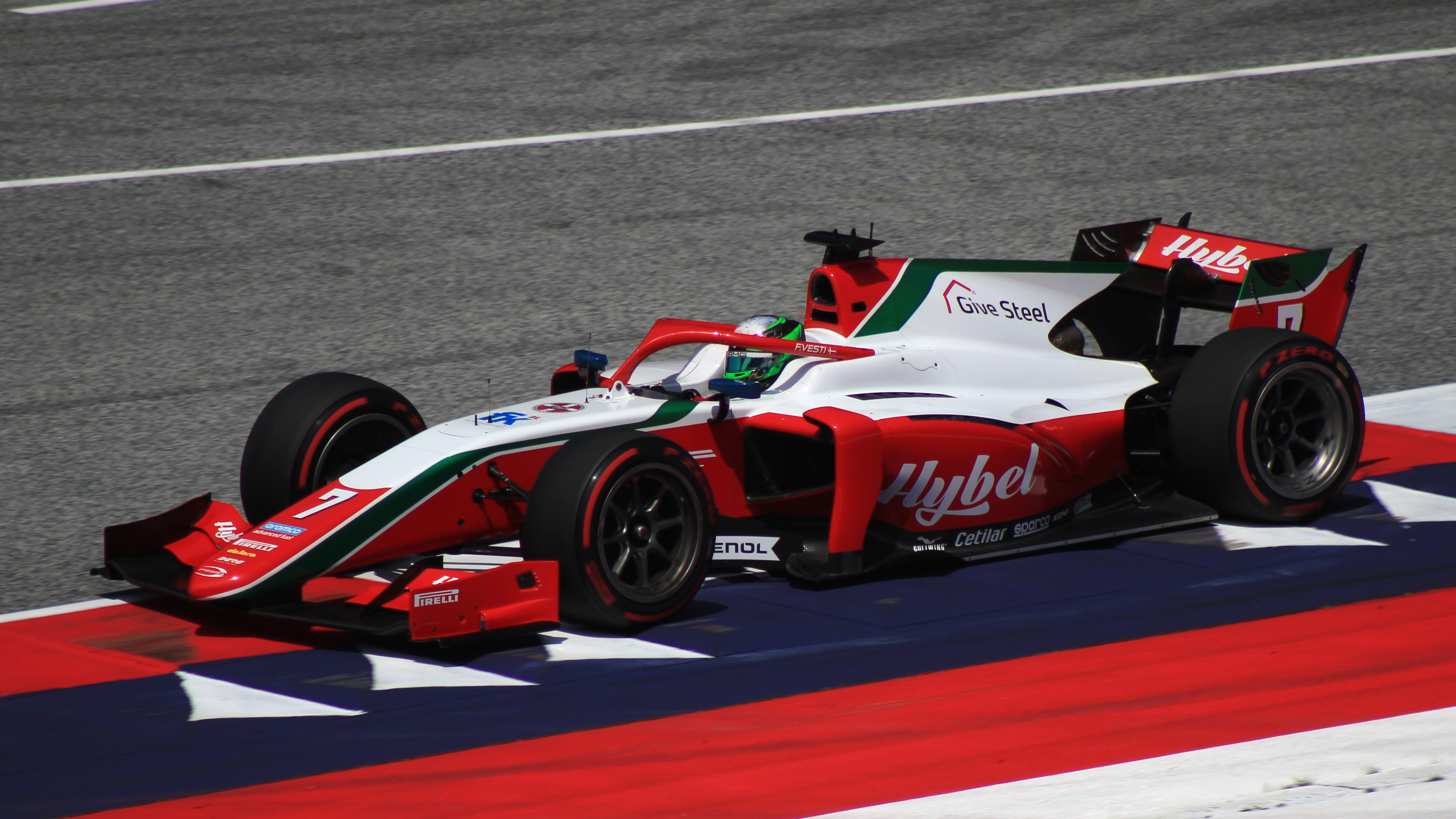
Vesti driving the Dallara F2 2018 during the 2023 Spielberg Formula 2 round.

Following the season finale at Yas Marina, it was announced that Vesti would move to Prema for the 2023 season alongside Ferrari junior Oliver Bearman. Vesti qualified fifth for the Bahrain opening round, but was penalised three places for the sprint due to impeding Arthur Leclerc. A gamble to pit in the sprint race failed to come through, with Vesti ending up 17th. The feature race would be more disappointing for Vesti, as he retired after colliding into Richard Verschoor, and the former was given a five-place grid penalty for the next race. Looking to bounce back in Jeddah, Vesti qualified in seventh and finished one place higher in the sprint. In the feature race, Vesti took advantage of the leaders spinning out, eventually leading for his first feature race win.

Vesti had a disappointing qualifying in Melbourne with 13th, but fought back in the sprint race for eighth position. He started on the slower tyres for the feature race, and it paid off during a late safety car, which saw the Dane wind up in fourth. Vesti had another successful weekend in Baku, qualifying fourth. In the sprint race, he remained out of trouble and even lead after a late safety car, but made a mistake at a corner, dropping to second whilst teammate Bearman won. In the feature race, an early pit stop saw him drop down, but he clawed his way back to fifth, and a further disqualification ahead from Victor Martins promoted Vesti back to fourth place in the race and second in the standings.

In the streets of Monaco, Vesti took his first pole of the year. Vesti ended the sprint race outside the points, but led in a lights-to-flag victory during the feature race and claimed the championship lead by five points. Vesti qualified in eighth for Barcelona and from third, stormed past Jak Crawford and Amaury Cordeel to lead the sprint race and ultimately take back-to-back wins from there. During the feature race, Vesti ran on the alternate strategy and made an overtaking charge, but ran out of time to chase fourth place from Ayumu Iwasa. He extended his lead in the standings to eleven points.

At the Red Bull Ring, Vesti qualified in second. Vesti narrowly missed points with ninth on Saturday, but took the lead from polesitter Martins in the feature race. He would hold the net race lead by a commanding distance, but a late safety car dented his hopes, as Verschoor and Iwasa on the alternate strategy pitted for fresher tyres. They would both overcome Vesti, and he was left to finish third. Having extended his lead to 20 points, he qualified in tenth in Silverstone, and drove away to his fourth victory of the year in the sprint race by 13 seconds. In the feature race, he was unlucky by pitting before the safety car. He was then hit from behind by Roy Nissany at the safety car restart, which caused the Dane to crash into Roman Staněk ahead, damaging his suspension and causing him to retire. Pourchaire closed the gap to him by six points with a third place.

In Hungary, Vesti qualified in third. During the feature race, Vesti passed Martins for second place at the start and would remain there for the rest of the race, extending his gap to Pourchaire in the standings to eleven points. Vesti qualified second at Spa-Francorchamps, forming a Prema 1–2 alongside polesitter and teammate Bearman. In the sprint race, Vesti moved to fourth early on, but slipped back to sixth by race's end. However, the feature race was over for him before it even begun, spinning out on the reconnaissance lap and failing to start the race, which paid the price as he lost the standings lead to Pourchaire.

In Zandvoort, Vesti qualified in third. After a red-flagged sprint race, Vesti headed into the feature race with high hopes, but spun on a damp track and fell to the back. Things took for the worse as his tyres detached from the car following his pit stop. In Monza, he qualified eighth. Starting third in the sprint race, he bolted to the lead and never looked back, eventually taking his fifth win of the year. However, the feature race ended disastrously on the first lap after Roman Staněk pushed Vesti onto the grass into a spin, and he was out of the race. This allowed Pourchaire to extend his lead from nine to 25 points after finishing in third place and getting the fastest lap point.

In Yas Marina, Vesti qualified ninth, whilst rival Pourchaire qualified 14th. Starting on the reverse front row for the sprint race, he challenged Enzo Fittipaldi into turn 1 but fell back to fourth after being overtaken by Isack Hadjar and Verschoor. He fought back and passed Hadjar and Verschoor before overtaking Fittipaldi with three laps to go to take his sixth win on the season. With Pourchaire finishing seventh, Vesti closed the gap to 16 points, setting up a last-race decider. In the feature race, after starting ninth, Vesti went longer than his rivals and pitted with 12 laps to go. He charged back up the order, and despite a late last lap collision with Zane Maloney that saw his car launched into the air and nearly into the barriers, he finished in third place. Despite scoring the most wins out of all the drivers in 2023 he missed out on the title by eleven points as Pourchaire finished in fifth place but was still praised for his great driving skills throughout the season.

Vesti finished second in the championship, securing six wins, ten podiums, one pole position, and three fastest laps. He also helped Prema to second place in the teams championship, 31 points behind champions ART Grand Prix.

== Sportscar racing career ==
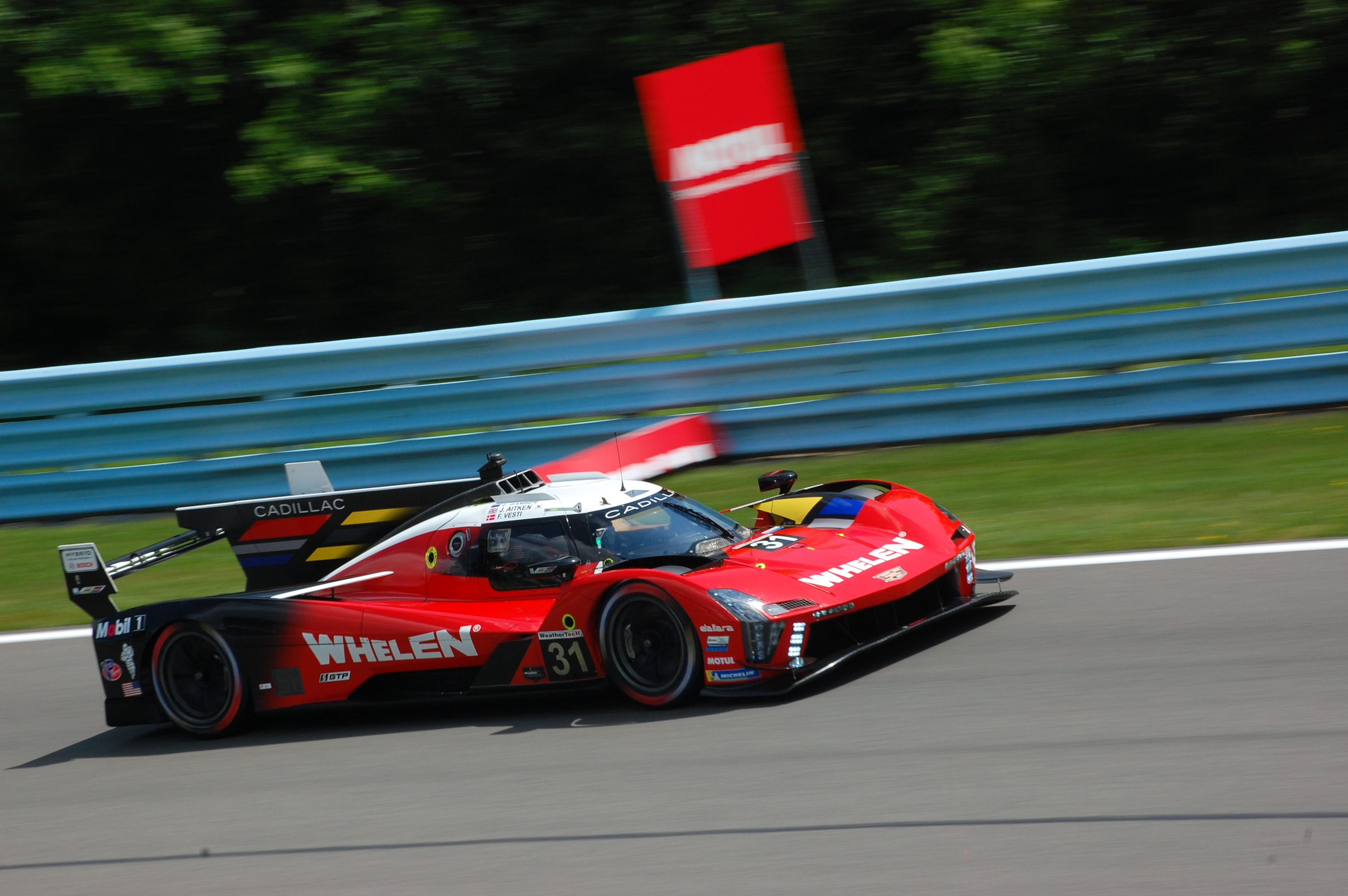
Vesti's No. 31 Cadillac V-Series.R at the 2025 Sahlen's Six Hours of The Glen.

=== 2024 ===
In January 2024, it was announced that Vesti would be making his sports car racing debut in the European Le Mans Series for the 2024 season, racing in the LMP2 class alongside Alejandro García and Ferdinand Habsburg. Starting out the season in Barcelona with a 12th place, the No. 47 took their first podium with a second place in Paul Ricard. After only scoring one point throughout the next three events, Vesti rounded out the campaign with third during the season finale in Portimão. Scoring two podiums throughout the season, Vesti finished ninth in the LMP2 standings with 34 points.

Vesti also competed in his first 24 Hours of Le Mans that year with Cool Racing alongside Matt Bell and Naveen Rao. It did not go as planned as his car would suffer from a radiator problem early on and re-joined two laps down causing them to finish down in tenth in the LMP2 category. He also raced in the 24 Hours of Spa, but retired after 276 laps due to floor damage.

=== IMSA SportsCar Championship ===
==== 2025 ====
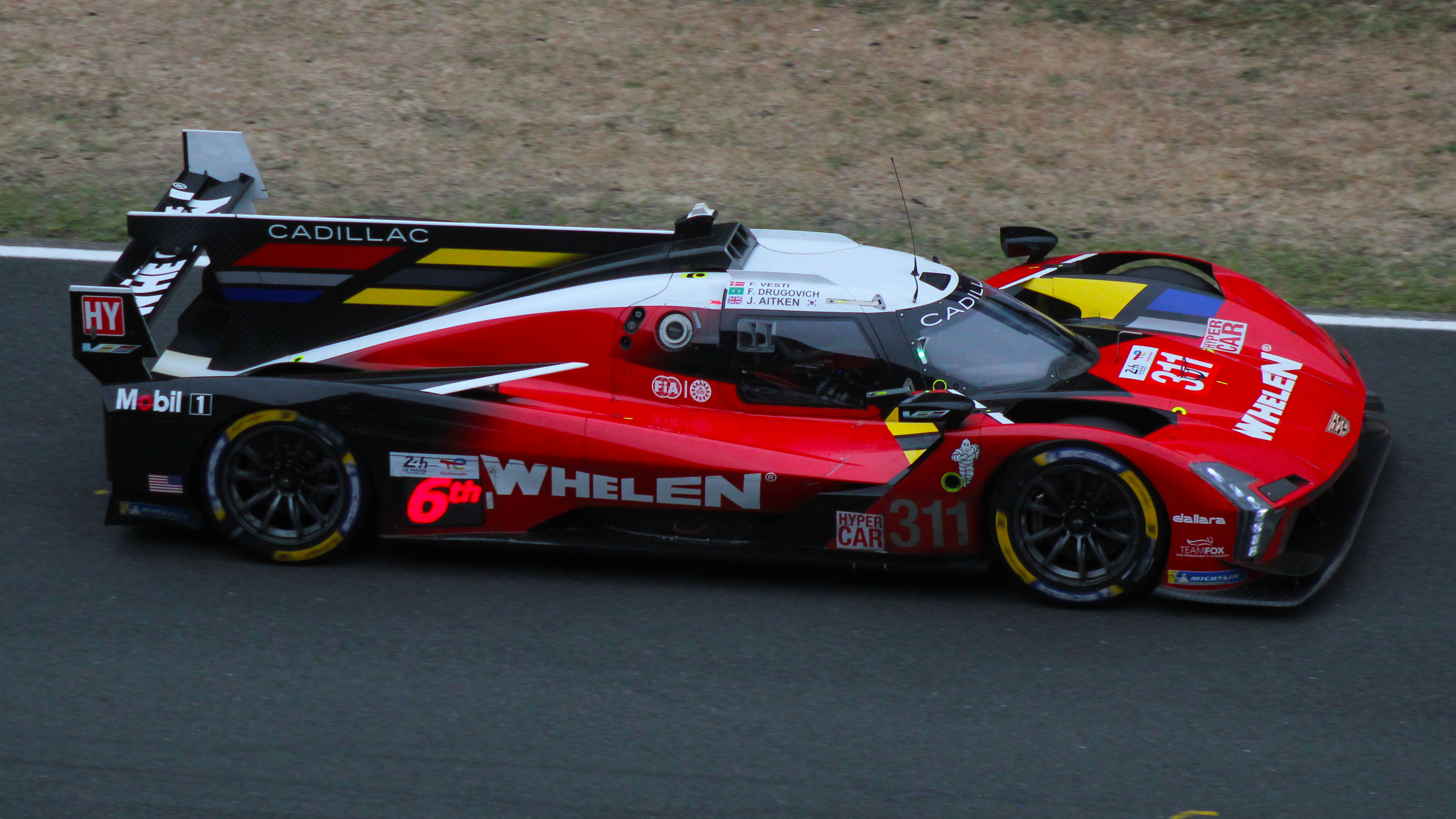
Vesti's No. 311 car at the 2025 24 Hours of Le Mans

For 2025, Vesti signed with Whelen Cadillac Racing to compete in the endurance rounds of the 2025 IMSA SportsCar Championship, alongside Earl Bamber and Jack Aitken. At the 24 Hours of Daytona, Vesti fell from first to sixth during the third hour. During the night, a rear suspension failure caused Vesti to crash; the team repaired the car which finished ninth in the GTP class. Vesti battled for the lead with Nick Tandy at Sebring, before the team fell back near the end and finished fourth. Vesti replaced Bamber at Laguna Seca, where he and Aitken finished sixth. In June, Vesti partnered Aitken and Felipe Drugovich at Le Mans, making them the youngest Hypercar lineup in terms of average age. Watkins Glen saw the AXR trio run up front until two laps to go, when a pit stop for a splash of fuel dropped them to fifth. At Indianapolis, Vesti controlled the race during its midpoint and built a ten-second gap to Kakunoshin Ohta, having taken over in first from Aitken. The latter then held on during a final lap restart to claim victory. The team then dominated the second half of Petit Le Mans and took their second win of the season. This result put the team second in both the overall standings and the Michelin Endurance Cup.

Following the season, Vesti described himself as having been a "sponge" while trying to get to grips with the Cadillac V-Series.R during the season, likening its complexity to that of an F1 car.

== Formula One ==
On 19 January 2021, Vesti was announced as a Mercedes Junior Team driver.

Vesti drove for Mercedes during the 2022 Abu Dhabi young driver test at the Yas Marina Circuit. Overall, Vesti completed 124 laps around the circuit, good enough for 22nd fastest.

Vesti took part in his first free practice session at the 2023 Mexico City Grand Prix. He drove 26 laps and was classified in 19th place. He again drove for Mercedes during FP1 at the Abu Dhabi Grand Prix. He also drove for the team during the young drivers' test, setting the third fastest time. Vesti was even under consideration of a seat at Williams for 2024, but they ultimately decided to stick with Logan Sargeant.

Vesti was promoted as Mercedes' reserve driver for 2024, sharing his role with Mick Schumacher. He drove the Mercedes W15 for the first time that year during the Yas Marina young drivers' test during the morning session, where he finished in 21st place overall.

Vesti continued as the Mercedes reserve driver alongside Valtteri Bottas for 2025. He then took part in his first free practice session of the year at the Bahrain Grand Prix, setting the eighteenth fastest time. Following that, he confirmed that he was in talks with Cadillac for 2026. He drove for Mercedes for a second time that year during FP1 of the Mexico City Grand Prix. He concluded the year by driving the Mercedes W16 during the Abu Dhabi young drivers' test, completing 145 laps.

For 2026, Vesti stepped up as Mercedes' third driver, replacing the Cadillac-bound Bottas. As of October, he has made three free practice appearances at the Barcelona-Catalunya, Hungarian and Mexico City Grands Prix. In November, Vesti was made available as a reserve driver for Alpine after the team released Paul Aron.

== Other motorsports ==
=== Formula E ===
In May 2024, Vesti sampled a Formula E car for the first time at the Tempelhof Airport Street Circuit during the Berlin rookie test, where he drove for Mahindra Racing. He was once again present for the Berlin rookie test in 2025, this time driving for Andretti.

== Personal life ==
Vesti was born in Vejle, Denmark. His father Peter runs a car sales company called Vesti El Biler.

As of 2023, Vesti lives in Oxford with World Endurance Championship driver Olli Caldwell.

== Karting record ==
=== Karting career summary ===
Season	Series	Team	Position
2011–12	Chrono Rotax Max Winter Cup — Mini Max	RS Competition	21st
2012	Rotax Winter Series — Mini Max	RS Competition	11th
2012	Rotax Nordic Championship — Rotax Mini	RS Competition	1st
2012	Kart Cup South Denmark — Cadett Junior	RS Competition	12th
2013	Racehall of Champions — 65 kg		13th
2013	Danish Championship — Cadet Junior		1st
2013	Rotax Max Challenge Denmark — Junior		26th
2014	NEZ Cup — KFJ		3rd
2014	Danish Championship — KFJ		1st
2014	Rotax Max Challenge Denmark — Junior		9th
2015	WSK Champions Cup — KFJ	Energy Corse	13th
2015	South Garda Winter Cup — KFJ	Energy Corse	NC
2015	WSK Gold Cup — KFJ	Energy Corse	NC
2015	Andrea Margutti Trophy — KFJ	Energy Corse	6th
2015	WSK Super Master Series — KFJ	Energy Corse	38th
2015	CIK-FIA European Championship — KFJ	Energy Corse	28th
2015	Trofeo Industrie — KFJ	Energy Corse	10th
2015	CIK-FIA World Championship — KFJ	Energy Corse	69th
2015	WSK Final Cup — KFJ	Forza Racing	1st
2016	WSK Champions Cup — OKJ	Forza Racing	28th
2016	South Garda Winter Cup — OKJ	Forza Racing	7th

== Racing record ==
=== Racing career summary ===
Season	Series	Team	Races	Wins	Poles	F/Laps	Podiums	Points	Position
2016	Formula Ford Denmark	Vesti Höyer Motorsport	20	2	0	1	8	254	4th
2017	ADAC Formula 4 Championship	Van Amersfoort Racing	21	1	0	2	3	113	7th
2017	F4 Danish Championship	Vesti Motorsport	15	8	5	4	15	320	**2nd**
2017	Formula 4 United States Championship	Global Racing Group	2	0	0	0	0	1	29th
2018	ADAC Formula 4 Championship	Van Amersfoort Racing	21	2	1	3	8	211	4th
2018	Italian F4 Championship	Van Amersfoort Racing	3	2	1	1	3	68	10th
2018	FIA Formula 3 European Championship	Van Amersfoort Racing	3	0	0	0	0	0	NC†
2018	Macau Grand Prix	Van Amersfoort Racing	1	0	0	0	0	N/A	15th
2019	Formula Regional European Championship	Prema Powerteam	24	13	10	9	20	467	**1st**
2019	Macau Grand Prix	SJM Prema Theodore Racing	1	0	0	0	0	N/A	10th
2020	FIA Formula 3 Championship	Prema Racing	18	3	1	3	4	146.5	4th
2021	FIA Formula 3 Championship	ART Grand Prix	20	1	1	0	5	138	4th
2022	FIA Formula 2 Championship	ART Grand Prix	28	1	1	1	5	117	9th
2023	FIA Formula 2 Championship	Prema Racing	25	6	1	1	10	192	**2nd**
2023	Formula One	Mercedes-AMG Petronas F1 Team	Test driver						
2024	European Le Mans Series - LMP2	Cool Racing	6	0	0	0	2	34	9th
2024	24 Hours of Le Mans - LMP2	Cool Racing	1	0	0	0	0	N/A	10th
2024	GT World Challenge Europe Endurance Cup	Mercedes-AMG Team GruppeM Racing	1	0	0	0	0	0	NC
2024	IMSA SportsCar Championship - LMP2	Tower Motorsports	1	0	0	0	0	281	43rd
2024	Formula One	Mercedes-AMG Petronas F1 Team	Reserve driver						
2025	IMSA SportsCar Championship - GTP	Cadillac Whelen	6	2	1	2	2	1877	13th
2025	24 Hours of Le Mans - Hypercar	Cadillac Whelen	1	0	0	0	0	N/A	NC
2025	Formula One	Mercedes-AMG Petronas F1 Team	Reserve driver						
2026	IMSA SportsCar Championship - GTP	Cadillac Whelen	6	1	2	1	4	1931	15th
2026	Formula One	Mercedes-AMG Petronas F1 Team	Reserve driver						

^{†} As Vesti was a guest driver, he was ineligible to score points.

=== Complete Formula Ford Denmark results ===
(key) (Races in bold indicate pole position) (Races in italics indicate fastest lap)

Year	Team	1	2	3	4	5	6	7	8	9	10	11	12	13	14	15	16	17	18	19	20	21	Pos	Points
2016	Vesti Höyer Motorsport	PAD1; 1; 5	PAD1; 2; 3	PAD1; 3; 2	DJU1; 1; 4	DJU1; 2; 5	DJU1; 3; 6	RUD; 1; 5	RUD; 2; 4	SPA; 1 DNS	SPA; 2; 3	DJU2; 1; 1	**DJU2**; **2**; 1	**DJU2**; **3** Ret	JYL; 1; 3	JYL; 2; 8	JYL; 3; 5	PAD2; 1; 3	PAD2; 2; 4	PAD3; 1; 4	PAD3; 2; 2	PAD3; 3; 4	4th	254

=== Complete F4 Danish Championship results ===
(key) (Races in bold indicate pole position) (Races in italics indicate fastest lap)

Year	Team	1	2	3	4	5	6	7	8	9	10	11	12	13	14	15	16	17	18	19	20	21	Pos	Points
2017	Vesti Motorsport	**JYL1**; **1**; 1	**JYL1**; **2**; 1	**JYL1**; **3**; 1	DJU1; 1	DJU1; 2	DJU1; 3	**PAD1**; **1**; 2	PAD1; 2; 2	**PAD1**; **3**; 1	JYL2; 1; 2	JYL2; 2; 1	JYL2; 3; 2	PAD2; 1; 3	PAD2; 2; 6	PAD2; 3; 1	DJU2; 1	DJU2; 2	DJU2; 3	**JYL3**; **1**; 1	JYL3; 2; 1	JYL3; 3; 2	2nd	320

=== Complete Formula 4 United States Championship results ===
(key) (Races in bold indicate pole position) (Races in italics indicate fastest lap)

Year	Entrant	1	2	3	4	5	6	7	8	9	10	11	12	13	14	15	16	17	18	19	20	DC	Points
2017	Global Racing Group	HMS; 1	HMS; 2	HMS; 2	IMS; 1	IMS; 2	IMS; 2	MSP; 1	MSP; 2	MSP; 3	MOH; 1	MOH; 2	MOH; 3	VIR; 1	VIR; 2	VIR; 3	COTA1; 1	COTA1; 2	COTA1; 3	COTA2; 1; 10	COTA2; 2; 12	29th	1

=== Complete ADAC Formula 4 Championship results ===
(key) (Races in bold indicate pole position) (Races in italics indicate fastest lap)

Year	Team	1	2	3	4	5	6	7	8	9	10	11	12	13	14	15	16	17	18	19	20	21	Pos	Points
2017	Van Amersfoort Racing	OSC1; 1; 14	OSC1; 2 Ret	OSC1; 3; 14	LAU; 1; 5	LAU; 2; 6	LAU; 3; 2	RBR; 1; 21	RBR; 2; 13	RBR; 3; 9	OSC2; 1; 9	OSC2; 2; 12	OSC2; 3; 1	NÜR; 1; 7	NÜR; 2; 10	NÜR; 3; 23	SAC; 1; 8	SAC; 2; 5	SAC; 3; 3	HOC; 1; 4	HOC; 2; 19	HOC; 3 Ret	7th	113
2018	Van Amersfoort Racing	OSC; 1; 6	OSC; 2; 2	OSC; 3; 4	HOC1; 1; 6	HOC1; 2; 3	HOC1; 3; 8	LAU; 1 Ret	LAU; 2 Ret	LAU; 3; 5	RBR; 1; 2	RBR; 2; 5	RBR; 3; 2	**HOC2**; **1**; 1	HOC2; 2; 11	NÜR; 1; 3	NÜR; 2; 1	NÜR; 3; 6	HOC3; 1; 3	HOC3; 2 Ret	HOC3; 3; 13		4th	211

=== Complete Italian F4 Championship results ===
(key) (Races in bold indicate pole position) (Races in italics indicate fastest lap)

Year	Team	1	2	3	4	5	6	7	8	9	10	11	12	13	14	15	16	17	18	19	20	21	Pos	Points
2018	Van Amersfoort Racing	ADR; 1	ADR; 2	ADR; 3	**LEC**; **1**; 2	LEC; 2; 1	LEC; 3; 1	MNZ; 1	MNZ; 2	MNZ; 3	MIS; 1	MIS; 2	MIS; 3	IMO; 1	IMO; 2	IMO; 3	VLL; 1	VLL; 2	VLL; 3	MUG; 1	MUG; 2	MUG; 3	10th	68

=== Complete FIA Formula 3 European Championship results ===
(key) (Races in bold indicate pole position) (Races in italics indicate fastest lap)

Year	Entrant	Engine	1	2	3	4	5	6	7	8	9	10	11	12	13	14	15	16	17	18	19	20	21	22	23	24	25	26	27	28	29	30	DC	Points
2018	Van Amersfoort Racing	Mercedes	PAU; 1	PAU; 2	PAU; 3	HUN; 1	HUN; 2	HUN; 3	NOR; 1	NOR; 2	NOR; 3	ZAN; 1	ZAN; 2	ZAN; 3	SPA; 1	SPA; 2	SPA; 3	SIL; 1	SIL; 2	SIL; 3	MIS; 1	MIS; 2	MIS; 3	NÜR; 1	NÜR; 2	NÜR; 3	RBR; 1	RBR; 2	RBR; 3	HOC; 1; 10	HOC; 2; 20	HOC; 3; 14	NC	0

=== Complete Macau Grand Prix results ===
Year	Team	Car	Qualifying	Quali Race	Main race
2018	(Netherlands) Van Amersfoort Racing	Dallara F317	18th	DNF	15th
2019	(Italy) SJM Theodore Racing by Prema	Dallara F3 2019	7th	18th	10th

=== Complete Formula Regional European Championship results ===
(key) (Races in bold indicate pole position) (Races in italics indicate fastest lap)

Year	Team	1	2	3	4	5	6	7	8	9	10	11	12	13	14	15	16	17	18	19	20	21	22	23	24	25	Pos	Points
2019	Prema Powerteam	LEC; 1; 1	LEC; 2; 2	**LEC**; **3**; 1	VLL; 1; 5	VLL; 2; 1	VLL; 3 C	**HUN**; **1**; 1	**HUN**; **2**; 1	**HUN**; **3**; 1	**RBR**; **1**; 1	**RBR**; **2**; 1	**RBR**; **3**; 3	IMO; 1; 3	**IMO**; **2**; 1	**IMO**; **3**; 3	IMO; 4; 6	CAT; 1; 1	CAT; 2; 3	CAT; 3; 10	**MUG**; **1**; 1	MUG; 2; 1	MUG; 3; 4	MNZ; 1; 2	MNZ; 2; 3	MNZ; 3; 1	1st	467

=== Complete FIA Formula 3 Championship results ===
(key) (Races in bold indicate pole position; races in italics indicate points for the fastest lap of top ten finishers)

Year	Entrant	1	2	3	4	5	6	7	8	9	10	11	12	13	14	15	16	17	18	19	20	21	DC	Points
2020	Prema Racing	RBR; FEA; 4	RBR; SPR; 6	**RBR**; **FEA**; 1‡	RBR; SPR; 8	HUN; FEA; Ret	HUN; SPR; Ret	SIL; FEA; 5	SIL; SPR; 4	SIL; FEA; 4	SIL; SPR; 8	CAT; FEA; Ret	CAT; SPR; 21	SPA; FEA; 6	SPA; SPR; 2	MNZ; FEA; 1	MNZ; SPR; 23†	MUG; FEA; 1	MUG; SPR; 9				4th	146.5
2021	ART Grand Prix	CAT; 1; 7	CAT; 2; 3	CAT; 3; 7	LEC; 1; 15	LEC; 2; 10	**LEC**; **3**; 6	RBR; 1; 7	RBR; 2; 2	RBR; 3; 1	HUN; 1 Ret	HUN; 2; 16	HUN; 3; 7	SPA; 1; 4	SPA; 2; 6	SPA; 3; 6	ZAN; 1; 9	ZAN; 2; 3	ZAN; 3; 8	SOC; 1; 8	SOC; 2 C	SOC; 3; 2	4th	138

^{†} Driver did not finish, but was classified, as they completed more than 90% of race distance.
^{‡} Half points were awarded, as less than 75% of the scheduled distance was completed.

=== Complete FIA Formula 2 Championship results ===
(key) (Races in bold indicate pole position) (Races in italics indicate points for the fastest lap of top ten finishers)

Year	Entrant	1	2	3	4	5	6	7	8	9	10	11	12	13	14	15	16	17	18	19	20	21	22	23	24	25	26	27	28	DC	Points
2022	ART Grand Prix	BHR; SPR; 13	BHR; FEA; Ret	JED; SPR; 12	JED; FEA; 18†	IMO; SPR; 10	IMO; FEA; 6	CAT; SPR; 7	CAT; FEA; 3	MCO; SPR; 11	MCO; FEA; 14	BAK; SPR; 1	BAK; FEA; 7	SIL; SPR; 6	SIL; FEA; 5	RBR; SPR; 12	**RBR**; **FEA**; 14	LEC; SPR; 5	LEC; FEA; 3	HUN; SPR; 5	HUN; FEA; 4	SPA; SPR; 15	SPA; FEA; 11	ZAN; SPR; 11	ZAN; FEA; 15	MNZ; SPR; 2	MNZ; FEA; 2	YMC; SPR; 11	YMC; FEA; 11	9th	117
2023	Prema Racing	BHR; SPR; 17	BHR; FEA; Ret	JED; SPR; 6	JED; FEA; 1	MEL; SPR; 8	MEL; FEA; 4	BAK; SPR; 2	BAK; FEA; 4	MCO; SPR; 9	**MCO**; **FEA**; 1	CAT; SPR; 1	CAT; FEA; 5	RBR; SPR; 9	RBR; FEA; 3	SIL; SPR; 1	SIL; FEA; Ret	HUN; SPR; 9	HUN; FEA; 2	SPA; SPR; 6	SPA; FEA; DNS	ZAN; SPR; 7	ZAN; FEA; Ret	MNZ; SPR; 1	MNZ; FEA; Ret	YMC; SPR; 1	YMC; FEA; 3			2nd	192

=== Complete Formula One participations ===
(key) (Races in bold indicate pole position) (Races in italics indicate fastest lap)

Year	Entrant	Chassis	Engine	1	2	3	4	5	6	7	8	9	10	11	12	13	14	15	16	17	18	19	20	21	22	23	24	WDC	Points
2023	Mercedes-AMG Petronas F1 Team	Mercedes-AMG F1 W14	Mercedes-AMG M14 E Performance1.6 V6 t	BHR	SAU	AUS	AZE	MIA	MON	ESP	CAN	AUT	GBR	HUN	BEL	NED	ITA	SIN	JPN	QAT	USA	MXC; TD	SAP	LVG	ABU; TD			–	–
2025	Mercedes-AMG Petronas F1 Team	Mercedes-AMG F1 W16	Mercedes-AMG M16 E Performance 1.6 V6 t	AUS	CHN	JPN	BHR; TD	SAU	MIA	EMI	MON	ESP	CAN	AUT	GBR	BEL	HUN	NED	ITA	AZE	SIN	USA	MXC; TD	SAP	LVG	QAT	ABU	–	–
2026	Mercedes-AMG Petronas F1 Team	Mercedes-AMG F1 W17	Mercedes-AMG M17 E Performance 1.6 V6 t	AUS	CHN	JPN	MIA	CAN	MON	BCN; TD	AUT	GBR	BEL	HUN; TD	NED	ITA	ESP	AZE	BHR	SIN	USA	MXC; TD	SAP	LVG	QAT	ABU		–	–

=== Complete European Le Mans Series results ===
(key) (Races in bold indicate pole position; results in italics indicate fastest lap)

Year	Entrant	Class	Chassis	Engine	1	2	3	4	5	6	Rank	Points
2024	Cool Racing	LMP2	Oreca 07	Gibson GK428 4.2 L V8	CAT; 12	LEC; 2	IMO; 10	SPA; 11	MUG; 13	ALG; 3	9th	34

=== 24 Hours of Le Mans results ===
Year	Team	Co-Drivers	Car	Class	Laps	Pos.	Class Pos.
2024	(Switzerland) Cool Racing	(United Kingdom) Matt Bell (United States) Naveen Rao	Oreca 07-Gibson	LMP2	291	24th	10th
2024	(Switzerland) Cool Racing	(United Kingdom) Matt Bell (United States) Naveen Rao	Oreca 07-Gibson	LMP2 Pro-Am	291	24th	5th
2025	(United States) Cadillac Whelen	(United Kingdom) Jack Aitken (Brazil) Felipe Drugovich	Cadillac V-Series.R	Hypercar	247	DNF	DNF

=== Complete IMSA SportsCar Championship results ===
(key) (Races in bold indicate pole position; races in italics indicate fastest lap)

Year	Entrant	Class	Make	Engine	1	2	3	4	5	6	7	8	9	Rank	Points
2024	Tower Motorsports	LMP2	Oreca 07	Gibson GK428 4.2 L V8	DAY	SEB	WGL	MOS	ELK	IMS	PET; 5			43rd	281
2025	Cadillac Whelen	GTP	Cadillac V-Series.R	Cadillac LMC55R 5.5 L V8	DAY; 9	SEB; 4	LBH	LGA; 6	DET	WGL; 5	ELK	**IMS**; 1	PET; 1	13th	1877
2026	Cadillac Whelen	GTP	Cadillac V-Series.R	Cadillac LMC55R 5.5 L V8	DAY; 2	**SEB**; 3	LBH; 2	LGA	DET	**WGL**; 1	ELK; 9	IMS	PET; 7	15th	1931

== Notes ==
Sporting positions
Preceded by Inaugural	Formula Regional European Championship; Champion; 2019	Succeeded by Gianluca Petecof
