= 2020 Budapest Formula 3 round =

Motor racing competition

(Hungary) 2020 Hungaroring Formula 3 round
Round details
- Round 3 of 9 in the 2020 FIA Formula 3 Championship.
- Layout of the Hungaroring
- Location: Hungaroring; Mogyoród, Hungary
- Course: Permanent racing facility 4.381 km (2.722 mi)

Feature Race
- Date: 18 July 2020
- Laps: 22
Pole position
Driver	(Russia) Aleksandr Smolyar	ART Grand Prix
Time	1:51.348	
Podium
First	(France) Théo Pourchaire	ART Grand Prix
Second	(Australia) Oscar Piastri	Prema Racing
Third	(Netherlands) Bent Viscaal (Note: Logan Sargeant was handed a post-race 5 second time penalty for leaving the track and gaining an advantage. He originally finished 3rd.)	MP Motorsport
Fastest lap
Driver	(United Kingdom) Jake Hughes	HWA Racelab
- Time: 1:34.195 (on lap 15)

Sprint Race
- Date: 19 July 2020
- Laps: 22
Podium
First	(Germany) David Beckmann	Trident
Second	(Australia) Oscar Piastri	Prema Racing
Third	(Norway) Dennis Hauger	Hitech Grand Prix
Fastest lap
Driver	(Australia) Oscar Piastri	Prema Racing
- Time: 1:50.721 (on lap 19)

The 2020 Hungaroring FIA Formula 3 round is a motor racing event scheduled to be held on 18 and 19 July 2020 at the Hungaroring in Mogyoród, Hungary. It is the third round of the 2020 FIA Formula 3 Championship, and will run in support of the 2020 Hungarian Grand Prix.

== Classification ==
=== Qualifying ===
The Qualifying session was scheduled to take place on 17 July 2020 at 14:00 local time, however, due to excessive surface water on the track from the rain, the session was stopped after spins from Lirim Zendeli and Liam Lawson at turn 8. As a result, the FIA announced the session would not be restarted. Qualifying was, therefore, rescheduled to 19:05 local time.

Pos.	No.	Driver	Team	Time/Gap	Grid
1	8	(Russia) Aleksandr Smolyar	ART Grand Prix	1:51.348	1
2	3	(United States) Logan Sargeant	Prema Racing	+0.258	2
3	7	(France) Théo Pourchaire	ART Grand Prix	+0.366	3
4	2	(Denmark) Frederik Vesti	Prema Racing	+0.880	4
5	20	(Australia) Calan Williams	Jenzer Motorsport	+0.904	5
6	1	(Australia) Oscar Piastri	Prema Racing	+0.930	6
7	9	(Venezuela) Sebastián Fernández	ART Grand Prix	+0.940	7
8	17	(Netherlands) Richard Verschoor	MP Motorsport	+1.004	8
9	18	(Netherlands) Bent Viscaal	MP Motorsport	+1.112	9
10	6	(Norway) Dennis Hauger	Hitech Grand Prix	+1.123	10
11	5	(New Zealand) Liam Lawson	Hitech Grand Prix	+1.290	11
12	12	(United Kingdom) Oliver Caldwell	Trident	+1.571	12
13	4	(United Kingdom) Max Fewtrell	Hitech Grand Prix	+1.653	13
14	11	(Germany) David Beckmann	Trident	+1.753	14
15	29	(Australia) Alex Peroni	Campos Racing	+1.883	15
16	25	(Germany) David Schumacher	Charouz Racing System	+1.935	16
17	21	(Italy) Federico Malvestiti	Jenzer Motorsport	+1.948	17
18	24	(Brazil) Igor Fraga	Charouz Racing System	+1.985	18
19	14	(Brazil) Enzo Fittipaldi	HWA Racelab	+2.084	19
20	19	(Austria) Lukas Dunner	MP Motorsport	+2.131	20
21	15	(United Kingdom) Jake Hughes	HWA Racelab	+2.153	21
22	16	(Australia) Jack Doohan	HWA Racelab	+2.300	22
23	27	(United Kingdom) Enaam Ahmed	Carlin Buzz Racing	+2.403	23
24	31	(Germany) Sophia Flörsch	Campos Racing	+2.507	24
25	10	(Germany) Lirim Zendeli	Trident	+2.589	25
26	26	(France) Clément Novalak	Carlin Buzz Racing	+2.643	26
27	28	(United States) Cameron Das	Carlin Buzz Racing	+2.652	27
28	23	(Czech Republic) Roman Staněk	Charouz Racing System	+2.895	28
29	22	(Italy) Matteo Nannini	Jenzer Motorsport	+3.432	29
30	30	(Italy) Alessio Deledda	Campos Racing	+6.107	30

=== Feature Race ===
Pos.	No.	Driver	Team	Laps	Time/Retired	Grid	Pts.
1	7	(France) Théo Pourchaire	ART Grand Prix	22	1:03:55.424	3	25 (2)
2	1	(Australia) Oscar Piastri	Prema Racing	22	+11.920	6	18
3	18	(Netherlands) Bent Viscaal	MP Motorsport	22	+17.360	9	15
4	17	(Netherlands) Richard Verschoor	MP Motorsport	22	+18.063	8	12
5	9	(Venezuela) Sebastián Fernández	ART Grand Prix	22	+19.636	7	10
6	3	(United States) Logan Sargeant	Prema Racing	22	+19.739	2	8
7	29	(Australia) Alex Peroni	Campos Racing	22	+21.431	15	6
8	6	(Norway) Dennis Hauger	Hitech Grand Prix	22	+21.656	10	4
9	26	(France) Clément Novalak	Carlin Buzz Racing	22	+22.208	26	2
10	11	(Germany) David Beckmann	Trident	22	+22.951	14	1
11	4	(United Kingdom) Max Fewtrell	Hitech Grand Prix	22	+23.428	13	
12	19	(Austria) Lukas Dunner	MP Motorsport	22	+27.298	20	
13	21	(Italy) Federico Malvestiti	Jenzer Motorsport	22	+27.972	17	
14	27	(United Kingdom) Enaam Ahmed	Carlin Buzz Racing	22	+28.597	23	
15	24	(Brazil) Igor Fraga	Charouz Racing System	22	+30.883	18	
16	25	(Germany) David Schumacher	Charouz Racing System	22	+31.265	16	
17	28	(United States) Cameron Das	Carlin Buzz Racing	22	+24.777	27	
18	31	(Germany) Sophia Flörsch	Campos Racing	22	+36.352	24	
19	14	(Brazil) Enzo Fittipaldi	HWA Racelab	22	+36.629	19	
20	30	(Italy) Alessio Deledda	Campos Racing	22	+38.432	30	
21	12	(United Kingdom) Oliver Caldwell	Trident	22	+44.026	12	
22	22	(Italy) Matteo Nannini	Jenzer Motorsport	22	+47.482	29	
23	23	(Czech Republic) Roman Staněk	Charouz Racing System	22	+49.705	28	
24	15	(United Kingdom) Jake Hughes	HWA Racelab	22	+1:02.217	21	
DNF	10	(Germany) Lirim Zendeli	Trident	6	Collision damage	25	
DNF	5	(New Zealand) Liam Lawson	Hitech Grand Prix	5	Engine	11	
DNF	16	(Australia) Jack Doohan	HWA Racelab	1	Collision damage	22	
DNF	8	(Russia) Aleksandr Smolyar	ART Grand Prix	1	Collision damage	1	(4)
DNF	2	(Denmark) Frederik Vesti	Prema Racing	0	Collision	4	
DNF	20	(Australia) Calan Williams	Jenzer Motorsport	0	Collision	5	
Fastest lap set by (France) Théo Pourchaire: 1:34.616 (lap 11) (Note: The fastest lap was set by Jake Hughes, however, as he did not finish in the top 10, the bonus points were awarded to Théo Pourchaire)

=== Sprint Race ===
Pos.	No.	Driver	Team	Laps	Time/Retired	Grid	Pts.
1	11	(Germany) David Beckmann	Trident	22	43:54.224	1	15
2	1	(Australia) Oscar Piastri	Prema Racing	22	+1.026	9	12 (2)
3	6	(Norway) Dennis Hauger	Hitech Grand Prix	22	+1.522	3	10
4	3	(United States) Logan Sargeant	Prema Racing	22	+1.975	5	8
5	17	(Netherlands) Richard Verschoor	MP Motorsport	22	+2.497	7	6
6	7	(France) Théo Pourchaire	ART Grand Prix	22	+2.724	10	5
7	8	(Russia) Aleksandr Smolyar	ART Grand Prix	22	+3.220	27	4
8	9	(Venezuela) Sebastián Fernández	ART Grand Prix	22	+3.594	6	3
9	14	(Brazil) Enzo Fittipaldi	HWA Racelab	22	+3.939	19	2
10	29	(Australia) Alex Peroni	Campos Racing	22	+4.665	4	1
11	4	(United Kingdom) Max Fewtrell	Hitech Grand Prix	22	+5.558	11	
12	26	(France) Clément Novalak	Carlin Buzz Racing	22	+5.911	2	
13	25	(Germany) David Schumacher	Charouz Racing System	22	+6.351	16	
14	31	(Germany) Sophia Flörsch	Campos Racing	22	+7.584	18	
15	20	(Australia) Calan Williams	Jenzer Motorsport	22	+8.158	29	
16	10	(Germany) Lirim Zendeli	Trident	22	+9.253	25	
17	18	(Netherlands) Bent Viscaal	MP Motorsport	22	+9.377 (Note: Bent Viscaal crossed the finish line first, but was awarded two five-second penalties; the first for causing a collision with Igor Fraga and the second for leaving the track and gaining an advantage.)	8	
18	12	(United Kingdom) Oliver Caldwell	Trident	22	+10.023	21	
19	15	(United Kingdom) Jake Hughes	HWA Racelab	22	+11.385	24	
20	23	(Czech Republic) Roman Staněk	Charouz Racing System	22	+12.231	23	
21	27	(United Kingdom) Enaam Ahmed	Carlin Buzz Racing	22	+24.654	14	
22	28	(United States) Cameron Das	Carlin Buzz Racing	22	+49.970	28	
23	30	(Italy) Alessio Deledda	Campos Racing	22	+51.050	20	
24	16	(Australia) Jack Doohan	HWA Racelab	22	+1:41.752 (Note: Jack Doohan was given a 20-second time penalty for causing a collision with Frederik Vesti.)	30	
25	22	(Italy) Matteo Nannini	Jenzer Motorsport	21	+1 lap	22	
DNF	21	(Italy) Federico Malvestiti	Jenzer Motorsport	19	Accident	13	
DNF	2	(Denmark) Frederik Vesti	Prema Racing	12	Collision	28	
DNF	5	(New Zealand) Liam Lawson	Hitech Grand Prix	7	Mechanical	26	
DNF	24	(Brazil) Igor Fraga	Charouz Racing System	2	Collision	15	
DNF	19	(Austria) Lukas Dunner	MP Motorsport	1	Collision	12	
Fastest lap set by (Australia) Oscar Piastri: 1:50.721 (lap 19)

== Standings after the event ==
Drivers' Championship standings

	Pos.	Driver	Points
	1	(Australia) Oscar Piastri	76
1	2	(United States) Logan Sargeant	50
6	3	(France) Théo Pourchaire	48
	4	(Germany) David Beckmann	47.5
	5	(Netherlands) Richard Verschoor	45

Teams' Championship standings

	Pos.	Team	Points
	1	(Italy) Prema Racing	163.5
	2	(Italy) Trident	83.5
1	3	(France) ART Grand Prix	81
1	4	(Netherlands) MP Motorsport	60
2	5	(United Kingdom) Hitech Grand Prix	44

- Note: Only the top five positions are included for both sets of standings.

== See also ==
- 2020 Hungarian Grand Prix
- 2020 Hungaroring Formula 2 round

== Notes ==
Previous round: 2020 2nd Spielberg Formula 3 round	FIA Formula 3 Championship; 2020 season	Next round: 2020 Silverstone Formula 3 round
Previous round: 2019 Budapest Formula 3 round	Budapest Formula 3 round	Next round: 2021 Budapest Formula 3 round
