= Lirim Zendeli =

German-Albanian racing driver

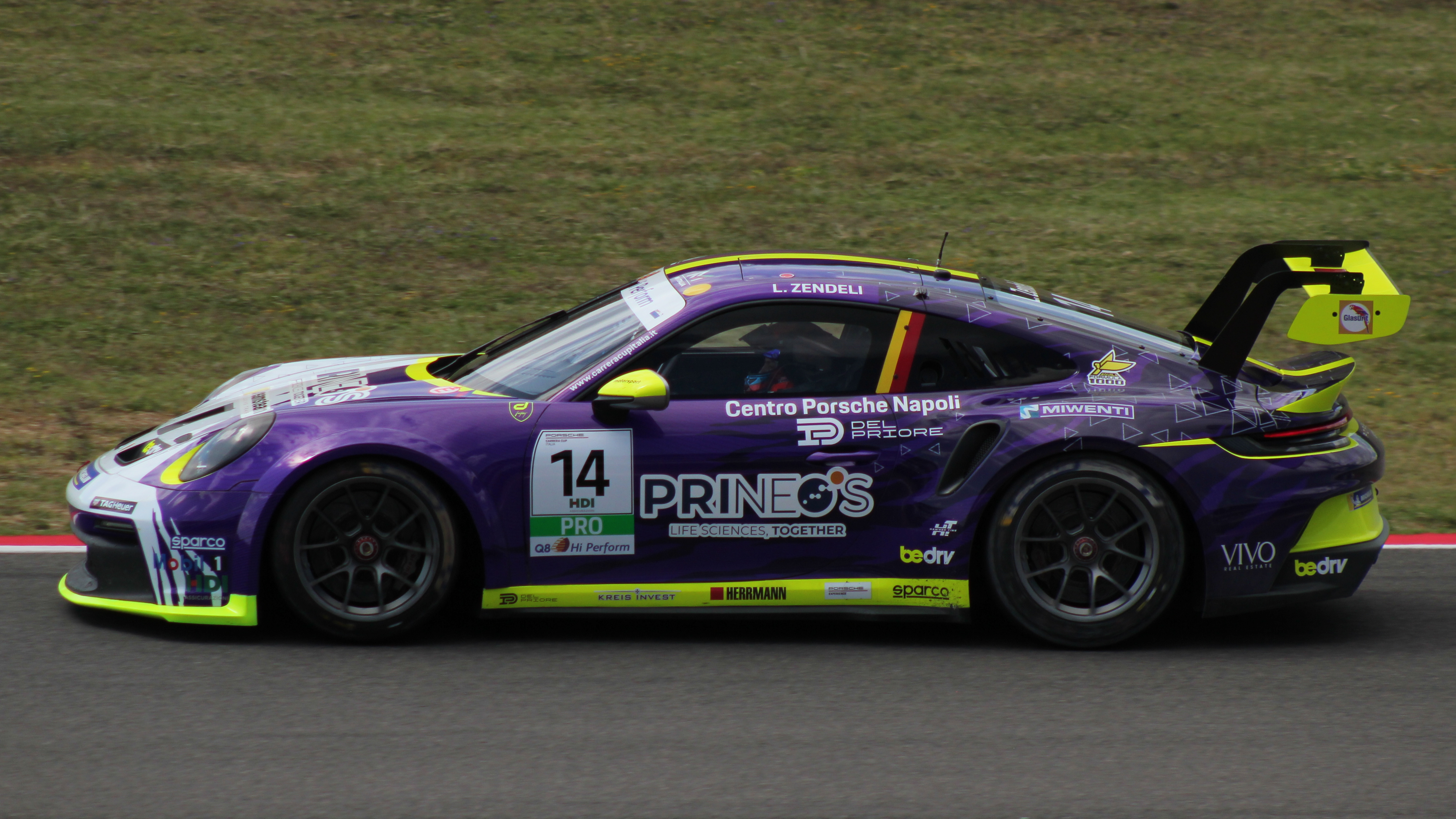
- Zendeli at the Mugello Circuit in 2025
- Nationality: (Germany) German (Albania) Albanian
- Born: 18 October 1999 (age 27) Bochum, Germany

Porsche Supercup career
- Debut season: 2024
- Current team: Ombra Racing
- Categorisation: FIA Silver
- Car number: 19
- Starts: 8 (8 entries)
- Wins: 0
- Podiums: 0
- Poles: 0
- Fastest laps: 0
- Best finish: 12th in 2024

Previous series
- 2024 2024 2023 2021–2022 2020 2019–2020, 2022 2019 2017 2016–18: Porsche Supercup; Porsche Carrera Cup Italy; USF Pro 2000 Championship; FIA Formula 2 Championship; Toyota Racing Series; FIA Formula 3 Championship; FR European Championship; Italian F4 Championship; ADAC Formula 4

Championship titles
- 2018: ADAC Formula 4

Lirim Zendeli (born 18 October 1999 in Bochum) is a German-born racing driver of Macedonian-Albanian descent. He currently competes in Porsche Carrera Cup Italy for BeDriver, having previously made his way up the racing ladder, from taking the ADAC Formula 4 title in 2018 to winning in FIA Formula 3 and racing in Formula 2.

== Racing career ==
=== Karting ===
Zendeli began his motorsport career in karting in 2010. In his home country, he finished third in the KF3 class of the ADAC Kart Masters in 2013 and won the KFJ class of the series in 2014. That year, he also made the switch to European championships and competed in the CIK-FIA World Championship in the KF Junior class, among other categories. In 2015, he concluded his karting career in the KF class of the South Garda Winter Cup, where he finished 11th.

=== ADAC Formula 4 ===
==== 2016 ====
2016 was Zendeli's first season in single-seaters, racing in ADAC Formula 4 with ADAC Berlin-Brandenburg. He failed to score points in the opening two rounds, but after that, regularly finished in the top-ten. He even achieved a podium finish with a second position in the penultimate race weekend at Zandvoort. With 74 points, he finished in 13th place in the championship, whilst he ended up fifth in the rookie class.

==== 2017 ====
The following year, Zendeli contested a double programme in both the ADAC and Italian Formula 4 championships, again with ADAC Berlin-Brandenburg. In the German series, Zendeli took his maiden single-seater win at Oschersleben. However, his title challenge was derailed when he suffered two retirements and two non-scoring finishes in the next three rounds. Despite this, he would win again in the Nürburgring and during the penultimate race at the Hockenheimring. Zendeli was classified fourth in the standings with 164 points, and he also had a further two podiums. In the Italian championship, Zendeli scored two podium finishes, but was not included in the final standings as he did not take part in the final race weekend at Monza.

==== 2018 ====
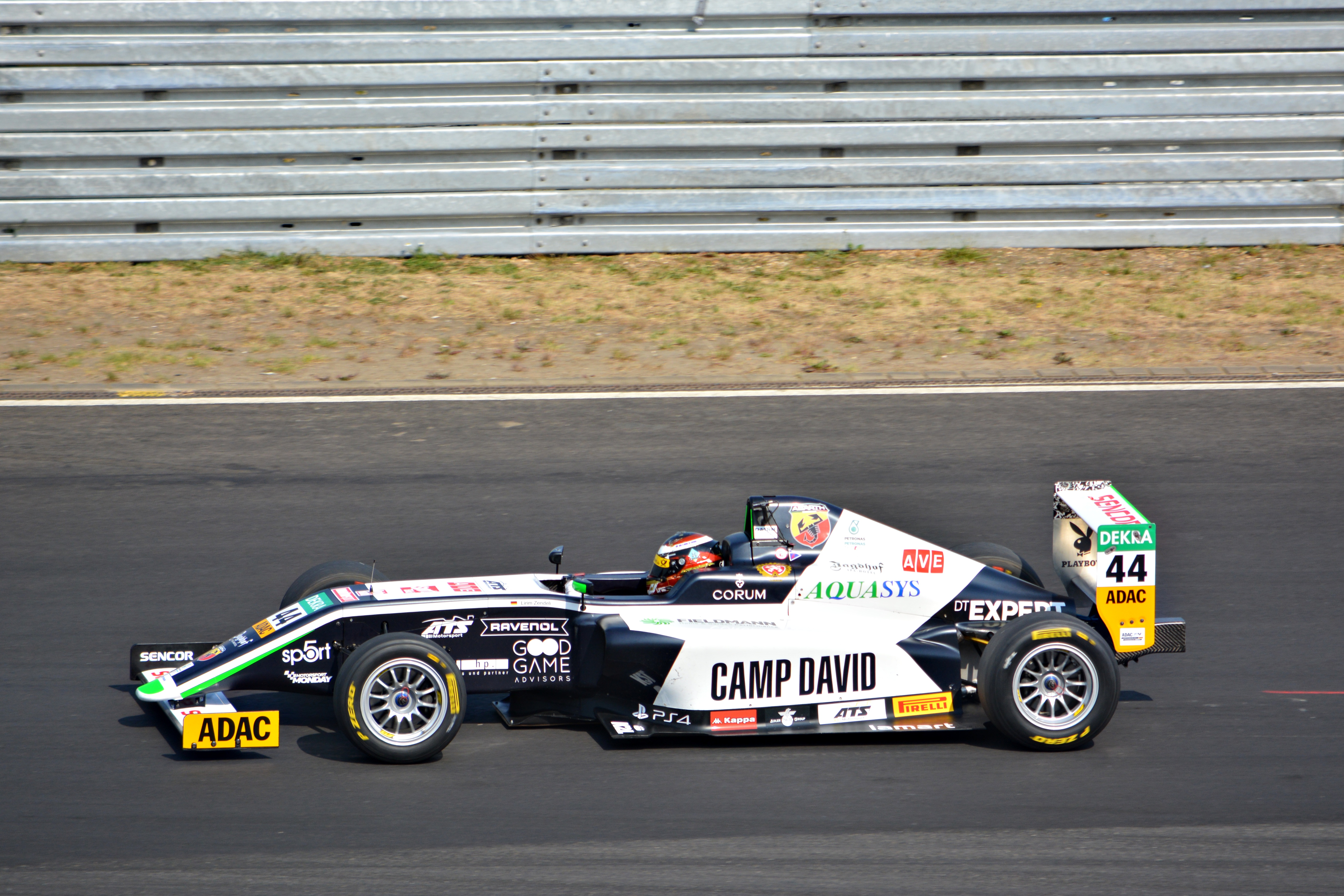
Zendeli racing in the 2018 ADAC Formula 4 Championship

For 2018, Zendeli moved to the US Racing-CHRS team, partnering David Schumacher, Mick Wishofer and Tom Beckhäuser, for a year that would prove to be his breakout. Zendeli dominated throughout the campaign, winning four of the first six races. Amazingly, Zendeli won at every round, and this allowed him to claim the title during the penultimate round at the Nürburgring. Zendeli rounded the season with two wins. He dominated the season by taking eight pole positions of a possible fourteen, winning ten races out of 21 and finishing over 100 points ahead of nearest rival Liam Lawson.

=== FIA Formula 3 Championship ===
==== 2019 ====
Zendeli progressed to Formula 3 in 2019, continuing with Charouz and alongside Fabio Scherer and Raoul Hyman. Zendeli's only points came at the Red Bull Ring, finishing eighth and seventh place. In the latter result, Zendeli had started on reverse pole but lost out to the faster cars. He was set for another strong result in Monza, but suffered a puncture while battling for the lead. He missed the final round, and ended 18th in the championship with six points.

Following the season, Zendeli made a one-off appearance in the 2019 Formula Regional European Championship. He claimed two second places and ended 14th in the standings.

==== 2020 ====
During 2020 pre-season, he competed in the Toyota Racing Series with Giles Motorsport. Zendeli took four podiums but no wins, and managed to end up eighth in the standings.

In Formula 3, Zendeli signed for Trident Racing to partner David Beckmann and Olli Caldwell in the 2020 season. Zendeli managed to qualify second in his first race at the Red Bull Ring, but dropped to fifth at the flag despite momentarily being in the lead, and followed it up with fifth in Race 2. He scored his first Formula 3 podium finish at the rain-shortened first race of the second Red Bull Ring round. The German made a brilliant start from sixth, soaring to second on the first lap and nearly snatching the lead from the Frederik Vesti. He remained in the position until the conclusion of the race. The next two rounds went poorly for Zendeli, starting at the Hungaroring where he suffered collision damage in Race 1 and had to retire, with 16th place in the following race. In Silverstone, he had no pace and did not score. During the second Silverstone round in Race 2, Zendeli lined up on reverse pole and led for most of the race. On the final lap, he battled with Bent Viscaal and the Dutchman won out, and eventually Zendeli crossed the finish line second, only 0.189 seconds behind Viscaal.

After a scoreless weekend in Barcelona, Zendeli took his first Formula 3 pole position at Spa-Francorchamps. He led every lap to take his first victory by four seconds. He ended Race 2 in eighth place. In Monza, Zendeli qualified second but was given a ten-place grid penalty for dangerous offences. After a quiet Race 1 in eighth, he had a wild Race 2, taking the lead early but made a mistake and fell to seventh. He eventually worked his way to finish in fourth. He took a second pole position at the season finale at Mugello. He remained in the lead for seven laps and later fought with Jake Hughes but Zendeli would fall to fourth place at the finish. Race 2 ended in disappointment as he was eliminated on the opening lap after colliding with Logan Sargeant. Zendeli ended the season eighth in the championship with 104 points with one win, two poles and two podiums – behind Beckmann but considerably ahead of Caldwell – and helped his Trident team to achieve second place in the teams' championship.

==== 2022 ====
Zendeli returned to Charouz Racing System for a cameo appearance for the 2022 Barcelona Formula 3 round, taking over David Schumacher's seat. Starting 22nd, in both races, Zendeli managed to progress up in both races, taking 20th and 15th in the sprint and feature races respectively. Zendeli was replaced by Zdeněk Chovanec for the Silverstone onwards. He was ranked 31st in the standings.

=== FIA Formula 2 Championship ===
==== 2021 ====
In December 2020, it was announced that Zendeli would graduate to the FIA Formula 2 Championship for the 2021 season, driving for MP Motorsport alongside Richard Verschoor. He scored his first points in his first race at Bahrain, thanks to a fastest lap by finishing ninth. That saw him line up for Sprint Race 2, and he was set for points when Christian Lundgaard made contact with his rear-right tyre, causing the German a puncture and his retirement. In Monaco, Zendeli qualified in 17th, and in the second sprint race he would finish in seventh, scoring points due to others' misfortune. In Baku, Zendeli had another incident in the second sprint but rescued a point with tenth in the feature race. Silverstone would be successful, as he finished close to the points in the first two races, before claiming ninth in the feature race. In Monza, Zendeli was on for a huge result in sprint race 1, but his race ended in the dying laps due to an engine issue. In the feature race, he had a strong race, climbing his way to his joint-best seventh place. In Sochi, he ended tenth in the sprint, and failed to score points. Due to financial reasons Zendeli left the team in early November and was replaced by Clément Novalak. Zendeli would finish 17th overall with 13 points, six places behind teammate Verschoor.

==== 2022 ====
In 2022, Zendeli made a cameo deputisation at Spa-Francorchamps, replacing the banned Olli Caldwell at Campos Racing, which was his first F2 round since he left MP Motorsport in 2021. He finished the sprint race in 20th and retired from the feature race, with Caldwell returning for the next round at Circuit Zandvoort. His 20th-place finish meant Zendeli was classified 29th, last in the standings.

=== Super Formula ===
At the end of 2022, Zendeli partook in a Super Formula test with B-Max Racing.

=== USF Pro 2000 Championship ===
Zendeli returned to racing in 2023, and would contest the 2023 USF Pro 2000 Championship with TJ Speed Motorsports under the Albanian flag. He would have a stellar debut, where he would get a fourth place at the second race in St. Petersburg, followed by a maiden podium with second place at the next round in Sebring. Zendeli got his maiden win a few races later in Road Atlanta. This was later followed by a double podium at Toronto and rounded of his season with a few more top five finishes. With a total of four podiums including that sole victory, and 258 points placed Zendeli sixth in the standings.

=== Porsche Supercup ===
For 2024, Zendeli announced that he would compete in the Porsche Supercup for Ombra Racing. He would score points in seven of the eight races he competed that season, with his highest finish being at Silverstone with eighth place, and he eventually placed 12th in the standings with 38 points.

Zendeli also competed in the Porsche Carrera Cup Italia with Ombra Racing as well. In just his second race in Misano, earning a third place and his first podium in sportscars. He scored another podium in Mugello with another third place, before earning pole positions for the second Imola round. With a double podium during the round in Vallelunga, it was a more successful campaign for Zendeli as he ended up fourth in the overall standings.

== Personal life ==
Zendeli's father Jauni, who had fled from North Macedonia before settling in Germany, founded a drywall works company in Bochum.

== Karting record ==
=== Karting career summary ===
| Season | Series | Team | Position |
|---|---|---|---|
| 2011 | DMV Kart Championship — KF3 | | 39th |
| 2011 | Ciao Thomas Knopper Memorial — KF3 | | 14th |
| 2012 | Euro Wintercup — KF3 | KSM Motorsport | 11th |
| 2012 | Bridgestone Cup Europe — KF3 | KSM Motorsport | 5th |
| 2012 | ADAC Kart Masters — KF3 | KSM Motorsport | 11th |
| 2012 | German Karting Championship — Junior | KSM Motorsport | 42nd |
| 2012 | DMV Kart Championship — KF3 | KSM Motorsport | 10th |
| 2013 | ADAC Kart Masters — KF3 | KSM Racing Team | 3rd |
| 2013 | WSK Euro Series — KFJ | KSM Racing Team | 24th |
| 2013 | German Karting Championship — Junior | KSM Racing Team | 5th |
| 2013 | WSK Final Cup — KFJ | KSM Racing Team | NC |
| 2014 | South Garda Winter Cup — KF3 | KSM Racing Team | 21st |
| 2014 | Andrea Margutti Trophy — KFJ | KSM Racing Team | 6th |
| 2014 | German Karting Championship — Junior | KSM Racing Team | 8th |
| 2014 | ADAC Kart Masters — KFJ | KSM Racing Team | 1st |
| 2014 | CIK-FIA World Championship — KFJ | KSM Racing Team | 27th |
| 2015 | South Garda Winter Cup — KF | KSM Racing Team | 11th |

== Racing record ==
=== Racing career summary ===
| Season | Series | Team | Races | Wins | Poles | F/Laps | Podiums | Points | Position |
|---|---|---|---|---|---|---|---|---|---|
| 2016 | ADAC Formula 4 Championship | ADAC Berlin-Brandenburg e.V. | 24 | 0 | 0 | 2 | 1 | 84 | 13th |
| 2017 | ADAC Formula 4 Championship | ADAC Berlin-Brandenburg e.V. | 21 | 3 | 3 | 1 | 5 | 164 | 4th |
| 2017 | Italian F4 Championship | BWT Mücke Motorsport | 18 | 0 | 0 | 1 | 2 | 114 | NC† |
| 2018 | ADAC Formula 4 Championship | US Racing – CHRS | 21 | 10 | 7 | 8 | 13 | 348 | **1st** |
| 2019 | FIA Formula 3 Championship | Sauber Junior Team by Charouz | 14 | 0 | 0 | 0 | 0 | 6 | 18th |
| 2019 | Formula Regional European Championship | US Racing | 3 | 0 | 0 | 0 | 2 | 42 | 14th |
| 2020 | FIA Formula 3 Championship | Trident | 18 | 1 | 2 | 1 | 3 | 104 | 8th |
| 2020 | Toyota Racing Series | Giles Motorsport | 15 | 0 | 0 | 0 | 4 | 200 | 8th |
| 2021 | FIA Formula 2 Championship | MP Motorsport | 17 | 0 | 0 | 1 | 0 | 13 | 17th |
| 2021 | DTM Trophy | T3 Motorsport | 2 | 0 | 0 | 0 | 0 | 0 | NC‡ |
| 2022 | FIA Formula 3 Championship | Charouz Racing System | 2 | 0 | 0 | 0 | 0 | 0 | 31st |
| 2022 | FIA Formula 2 Championship | Campos Racing | 2 | 0 | 0 | 0 | 0 | 0 | 29th |
| 2023 | USF Pro 2000 Championship | TJ Speed Motorsports | 17 | 1 | 0 | 1 | 4 | 258 | 6th |
| 2023 | GT Winter Series | East Racing | ? | ? | ? | ? | ? | 18.25 | 57th |
| 2024 | Porsche Supercup | Ombra Racing | 8 | 0 | 0 | 0 | 0 | 36 | 12th |
| 2024 | Porsche Carrera Cup Italy | Ombra Racing | 12 | 0 | 2 | 0 | 4 | 149 | 4th |
| 2025 | Porsche Carrera Cup Italy | BeDriver | 10 | 1 | 0 | 0 | 1 | 115 | 6th |
| 2026 | Porsche Carrera Cup Italy | BeDriver | 11 | 0 | 0 | 1 | 1 | 90 | 7th |
| 2026 | GT Summer Series - GT4 | East-Racing Motorsport | | | | | | | |

^{†} As Zendeli had not competed in the required number of rounds he was ineligible for a championship position.
^{‡} As Zendeli was a guest driver, he was ineligible to score points.
* Season still in progress.

=== Complete ADAC Formula 4 Championship results ===
(key) (Races in bold indicate pole position) (Races in italics indicate fastest lap)

| Year | Team | 1 | 2 | 3 | 4 | 5 | 6 | 7 | 8 | 9 | 10 | 11 | 12 | 13 | 14 | 15 | 16 | 17 | 18 | 19 | 20 | 21 | 22 | 23 | 24 | Pos | Points |
|---|---|---|---|---|---|---|---|---|---|---|---|---|---|---|---|---|---|---|---|---|---|---|---|---|---|---|---|
| 2016 | ADAC Berlin-Brandenburg e.V. | OSC1; 1 Ret | OSC1; 2; 16 | OSC1; 3 Ret | SAC; 1; 18 | SAC; 2; 11 | SAC; 3; 11 | LAU; 1; 21 | LAU; 2; 6 | LAU; 3; 5 | OSC2; 1; 25 | OSC2; 2; 5 | OSC2; 3; 13 | RBR; 1; 27 | RBR; 2; 10 | RBR; 3; 14 | NÜR; 1 Ret | NÜR; 2; 12 | NÜR; 3; 31 | ZAN; 1; 4 | ZAN; 2; 2 | ZAN; 3; 7 | HOC; 1; 4 | HOC; 2; 5 | HOC; 3; 24 | 13th | 74 |
| 2017 | ADAC Berlin-Brandenburg e.V. | OSC1; 1; 7 | OSC1; 2; 9 | OSC1; 3; 1 | LAU; 1; 7 | LAU; 2; 9 | LAU; 3 Ret | RBR; 1; 7 | RBR; 2 Ret | RBR; 3; 5 | OSC2; 1; 11 | OSC2; 2; 11 | OSC2; 3; 7 | **NÜR**; **1**; 1 | NÜR; 2; 2 | NÜR; 3; 6 | SAC; 1; 20 | SAC; 2; 6 | SAC; 3; 8 | **HOC**; **1**; 2 | **HOC**; **2**; 1 | HOC; 3 Ret | | | | 4th | 164 |
| 2018 | US Racing – CHRS | **OSC**; **1**; 1 | **OSC**; **2**; 1 | OSC; 3 Ret | **HOC1**; **1**; 1 | **HOC1**; **2**; 1 | HOC1; 3; 3 | **LAU**; **1**; 11 | **LAU**; **2**; 1 | LAU; 3; 4 | RBR; 1; 4 | RBR; 2; 1 | RBR; 3; 5 | HOC2; 1; 3 | HOC2; 2; 1 | **NÜR**; **1**; 1 | **NÜR**; **2**; 2 | NÜR; 3; 5 | HOC3; 1; 7 | HOC3; 2; 1 | HOC3; 3; 1 | | | | | 1st | 348 |

=== Complete Italian F4 Championship results ===
(key) (Races in bold indicate pole position) (Races in italics indicate fastest lap)

| Year | Team | 1 | 2 | 3 | 4 | 5 | 6 | 7 | 8 | 9 | 10 | 11 | 12 | 13 | 14 | 15 | 16 | 17 | 18 | 19 | 20 | 21 | Pos | Points |
|---|---|---|---|---|---|---|---|---|---|---|---|---|---|---|---|---|---|---|---|---|---|---|---|---|
| 2017 | BWT Mücke Motorsport | MIS; 1; 21 | MIS; 2; 9 | MIS; 3; 8 | ADR; 1; 12 | ADR; 2; 3 | ADR; 3; 5 | VLL; 1; 8 | VLL; 2 Ret | VLL; 3; 9 | MUG1; 1; 7 | MUG1; 2; 5 | MUG1; 3; 12 | IMO; 1; 3 | IMO; 2; 6 | IMO; 3; 4 | MUG2; 1; 7 | MUG2; 2; 6 | MUG2; 3; 8 | MNZ; 1 | MNZ; 2 | MNZ; 3 | NC† | 114 |

^{†} Zendeli did not compete in the required number of rounds to be eligible for a championship position.

=== Complete FIA Formula 3 Championship results ===
(key) (Races in bold indicate pole position; races in italics indicate points for the fastest lap of top ten finishers)

| Year | Entrant | 1 | 2 | 3 | 4 | 5 | 6 | 7 | 8 | 9 | 10 | 11 | 12 | 13 | 14 | 15 | 16 | 17 | 18 | DC | Points |
|---|---|---|---|---|---|---|---|---|---|---|---|---|---|---|---|---|---|---|---|---|---|
| 2019 | Sauber Junior Team by Charouz | CAT; FEA; 14 | CAT; SPR; 11 | LEC; FEA; Ret | LEC; SPR; 16 | RBR; FEA; 8 | RBR; SPR; 7 | SIL; FEA; 15 | SIL; SPR; 9 | HUN; FEA; Ret | HUN; SPR; 20 | SPA; FEA; 22 | SPA; SPR; 22† | MNZ; FEA; Ret | MNZ; SPR; 18 | SOC; FEA; WD | SOC; SPR; WD | | | 18th | 6 |
| 2020 | Trident | RBR; FEA; 5 | RBR; SPR; 5 | RBR; FEA; 2‡ | RBR; SPR; 10 | HUN; FEA; Ret | HUN; SPR; 16 | SIL; FEA; 13 | SIL; SPR; 11 | SIL; FEA; 9 | SIL; SPR; 2 | CAT; FEA; 12 | CAT; SPR; 16 | **SPA**; **FEA**; 1 | SPA; SPR; 8 | MNZ; FEA; 7 | MNZ; SPR; 4 | **MUG**; **FEA**; 4 | MUG; SPR; Ret | 8th | 104 |
| 2022 | Charouz Racing System | BHR; SPR | BHR; FEA | IMO; SPR | IMO; FEA | CAT; SPR; 20 | CAT; FEA; 15 | SIL; SPR | SIL; FEA | RBR; SPR | RBR; FEA | HUN; SPR | HUN; FEA | SPA; SPR | SPA; FEA | ZAN; SPR | ZAN; FEA | MNZ; SPR | MNZ; SPR | 31st | 0 |

^{†} Driver did not finish the race but was classified as he completed over 90% of the race distance.
^{‡} Half points awarded as less than 75% of race distance was completed.

=== Complete Formula Regional European Championship results ===
(key) (Races in bold indicate pole position; races in italics indicate fastest lap)

| Year | Entrant | 1 | 2 | 3 | 4 | 5 | 6 | 7 | 8 | 9 | 10 | 11 | 12 | 13 | 14 | 15 | 16 | 17 | 18 | 19 | 20 | 21 | 22 | 23 | 24 | 25 | DC | Points |
|---|---|---|---|---|---|---|---|---|---|---|---|---|---|---|---|---|---|---|---|---|---|---|---|---|---|---|---|---|
| 2019 | US Racing | LEC; 1 | LEC; 2 | LEC; 3 | VLL; 1 | VLL; 2 | VLL; 3 | HUN; 1 | HUN; 2 | HUN; 3 | RBR; 1 | RBR; 2 | RBR; 3 | IMO; 1 | IMO; 2 | IMO; 3 | IMO; 4 | CAT; 1 | CAT; 2 | CAT; 3 | MUG; 1; 7 | MUG; 2; 2 | MUG; 3; 2 | MNZ; 1 | MNZ; 2 | MNZ; 3 | 14th | 42 |

=== Complete Toyota Racing Series results ===
(key) (Races in bold indicate pole position) (Races in italics indicate fastest lap)

| Year | Team | 1 | 2 | 3 | 4 | 5 | 6 | 7 | 8 | 9 | 10 | 11 | 12 | 13 | 14 | 15 | DC | Points |
|---|---|---|---|---|---|---|---|---|---|---|---|---|---|---|---|---|---|---|
| 2020 | Giles Motorsport | HIG; 1; 3 | HIG; 2; 3 | HIG; 3; 8 | TER; 1; 7 | TER; 2; 2 | TER; 3; 12 | HMP; 1; 10 | HMP; 2; 7 | HMP; 3; 5 | PUK; 1; 12 | PUK; 2 Ret | PUK; 3; 3 | MAN; 1; 13 | MAN; 2; 15 | MAN; 3; 13 | 8th | 200 |

=== Complete FIA Formula 2 Championship results ===
(key) (Races in bold indicate pole position) (Races in italics indicate points for the fastest lap of top ten finishers)

| Year | Entrant | 1 | 2 | 3 | 4 | 5 | 6 | 7 | 8 | 9 | 10 | 11 | 12 | 13 | 14 | 15 | 16 | 17 | 18 | 19 | 20 | 21 | 22 | 23 | 24 | 25 | 26 | 27 | 28 | DC | Points |
|---|---|---|---|---|---|---|---|---|---|---|---|---|---|---|---|---|---|---|---|---|---|---|---|---|---|---|---|---|---|---|---|
| 2021 | MP Motorsport | BHR; SP1; 9 | BHR; SP2; Ret | BHR; FEA; 18 | MCO; SP1; 15 | MCO; SP2; 7 | MCO; FEA; Ret | BAK; SP1; 13 | BAK; SP2; Ret | BAK; FEA; 10 | SIL; SP1; 11 | SIL; SP2; 9 | SIL; FEA; 9 | MNZ; SP1; 15† | MNZ; SP2; 12 | MNZ; FEA; 7 | SOC; SP1; 10 | SOC; SP2; C | SOC; FEA; 16 | JED; SP1 | JED; SP2 | JED; FEA | YMC; SP1 | YMC; SP2 | YMC; FEA | | | | | 17th | 13 |
| 2022 | Campos Racing | BHR; SPR | BHR; FEA | JED; SPR | JED; FEA | IMO; SPR | IMO; FEA | CAT; SPR | CAT; FEA | MCO; SPR | MCO; FEA | BAK; SPR | BAK; FEA | SIL; SPR | SIL; FEA | RBR; SPR | RBR; FEA | LEC; SPR | LEC; FEA | HUN; SPR | HUN; FEA | SPA; SPR; 20 | SPA; FEA; 21† | ZAN; SPR | ZAN; FEA | MNZ; SPR | MNZ; FEA | YMC; SPR | YMC; FEA | 29th | 0 |

=== American open-wheel racing results ===
==== USF Pro 2000 Championship ====
(key) (Races in bold indicate pole position) (Races in italics indicate fastest lap) (Races with * indicate most race laps led)

| Year | Team | 1 | 2 | 3 | 4 | 5 | 6 | 7 | 8 | 9 | 10 | 11 | 12 | 13 | 14 | 15 | 16 | 17 | 18 | Rank | Points |
|---|---|---|---|---|---|---|---|---|---|---|---|---|---|---|---|---|---|---|---|---|---|
| 2023 | TJ Speed Motorsports | STP; 1; 16 | STP; 2; 4 | SEB; 1; 6 | SEB; 2; 2 | IMS; 1; 13 | IMS; 2; 10 | IRP | ROA; 1; 19 | ROA; 2; 1* | MOH; 1; 6 | MOH; 2; 10 | TOR; 1; 3 | TOR; 2; 2 | COTA; 1; 5 | COTA; 1; 4 | POR; 1; 11 | POR; 2; 4 | POR; 3; 18 | 6th | 258 |

=== Complete Porsche Carrera Cup Italy results ===
(key) (Races in bold indicate pole position) (Races in italics indicate fastest lap)

| Year | Team | 1 | 2 | 3 | 4 | 5 | 6 | 7 | 8 | 9 | 10 | 11 | 12 | DC | Points |
|---|---|---|---|---|---|---|---|---|---|---|---|---|---|---|---|
| 2024 | Ombra Racing | MIS; 1; 8 | MIS; 2; 3 | IMO1; 1; 5 | IMO1; 2; 7 | MUG; 1; 3 | MUG; 2; 5 | **IMO2**; **1**; 4 | **IMO2**; **2**; 7 | VLL; 1; 3 | VLL; 2; 3 | MNZ; 1; 10 | MNZ; 2; 7 | 4th | 149 |
| 2025 | BeDriver | MIS1; 1 | MIS1; 2 | VLL; 1; 9 | VLL; 2; 7 | MUG; 1; 2 | MUG; 2; 4 | IMO; 1; 8 | IMO; 2; 6 | MIS2; 1; 4 | MIS2; 2; 1 | MNZ; 1; 8 | MNZ; 2 Ret | 6th | 115 |

=== Complete Porsche Supercup results ===
(key) (Races in bold indicate pole position; races in italics indicate fastest lap)

| Year | Team | 1 | 2 | 3 | 4 | 5 | 6 | 7 | 8 | Pos. | Points |
|---|---|---|---|---|---|---|---|---|---|---|---|
| 2024 | Ombra Racing | IMO; 17 | MON; 11 | RBR; 15 | SIL; 8 | HUN; 11 | SPA; 13 | ZND; 12 | MNZ; 11 | 12th | 38 |
