= 2020 2nd Spielberg Formula 3 round =

Motor racing competition

(Austria) 2020 2nd Spielberg Formula 3 round
Round details
- Round 2 of 9 in the 2020 FIA Formula 3 Championship.
- Layout of the Red Bull Ring
- Location: Red Bull Ring; Spielberg, Styria, Austria
- Course: Permanent racing facility 4.326 km (2.690 mi)

Feature Race
- Date: 11 July 2020
- Laps: 11 (Scheduled distance: 24 laps)
Pole position
Driver	(Denmark) Frederik Vesti	Prema Racing
Time	1:20.378	
Podium
First	(Denmark) Frederik Vesti	Prema Racing
Second	(Germany) Lirim Zendeli	Trident
Third	(Germany) David Beckmann	Trident
Fastest lap
Driver	(Denmark) Frederik Vesti	Prema Racing
- Time: 1:33.358 (on lap 3)

Sprint Race
- Date: 12 July 2020
- Laps: 24
Podium
First	(France) Théo Pourchaire	ART Grand Prix
Second	(United States) Logan Sargeant	Prema Racing
Third	(Germany) David Beckmann	Trident
Fastest lap
Driver	(Australia) Oscar Piastri	Prema Racing
- Time: 1:20.968 (on lap 20)

The 2020 2nd Red Bull Ring FIA Formula 3 round was a motor racing event held on 11 and 12 July 2020 at the Red Bull Ring in Austria. It is the second round of the 2020 FIA Formula 3 Championship, and ran in support of the 2020 Styrian Grand Prix.

== Classification ==
=== Qualifying ===
Pos.	No.	Driver	Team	Time/Gap	Grid
1	2	(Denmark) Frederik Vesti	Prema Racing	1:20.483	1
2	11	(Germany) David Beckmann	Trident	+0.123	2
3	3	(United States) Logan Sargeant	Prema Racing	+0.192	3
4	1	(Australia) Oscar Piastri	Prema Racing	+0.212	4
5	7	(France) Théo Pourchaire	ART Grand Prix	+0.276	5
6	10	(Germany) Lirim Zendeli	Trident	+0.331	6
7	29	(Australia) Alex Peroni	Campos Racing	+0.356	7
8	12	(United Kingdom) Olli Caldwell	Trident	+0.389	8
9	9	(Venezuela) Sebastián Fernández	ART Grand Prix	+0.438	9
10	5	(New Zealand) Liam Lawson	Hitech Grand Prix	+0.475	10
11	17	(Netherlands) Richard Verschoor	MP Motorsport	+0.493	11
12	8	(Russia) Aleksandr Smolyar	ART Grand Prix	+0.557	12
13	4	(United Kingdom) Max Fewtrell	Hitech Grand Prix	+0.582	13
14	22	(Italy) Matteo Nannini	Jenzer Motorsport	+0.648	14
15	19	(Austria) Lukas Dunner	MP Motorsport	+0.737	15
16	15	(United Kingdom) Jake Hughes	HWA Racelab	+0.744	16
17	25	(Germany) David Schumacher	Charouz Racing System	+0.763	17
18	18	(Netherlands) Bent Viscaal	MP Motorsport	+0.778	18
19	23	(Czech Republic) Roman Staněk	Charouz Racing System	+0.791	19
20	6	(Norway) Dennis Hauger	Hitech Grand Prix	+0.846	20
21	31	(Germany) Sophia Flörsch	Campos Racing	+0.850	21
22	14	(Brazil) Enzo Fittipaldi	HWA Racelab	+0.891	22
23	16	(Australia) Jack Doohan	HWA Racelab	+0.966	23
24	24	(Brazil) Igor Fraga	Charouz Racing System	+1.037	24
25	26	(France) Clément Novalak	Carlin Buzz Racing	+1.058	25
26	20	(Australia) Calan Williams	Jenzer Motorsport	+1.149	26
27	27	(United Kingdom) Enaam Ahmed	Carlin Buzz Racing	+1.166	27
28	28	(United States) Cameron Das	Carlin Buzz Racing	+1.169	28
29	21	(Italy) Federico Malvestiti	Jenzer Motorsport	+1.228	29
30	30	(Italy) Alessio Deledda	Campos Racing	+1.848	30

=== Feature Race ===
The race originally completed 12 laps, however, due to the race being stopped and several incidents occurring prior to the red flag, the race results were counted back to lap 11.

Pos.	No.	Driver	Team	Laps	Time/Retired	Grid	Pts.
1	2	(Denmark) Frederik Vesti	Prema Racing	11	19:29.657	1	12.5 (4+1)
2	10	(Germany) Lirim Zendeli	Trident	11	+0.626	6	9
3	11	(Germany) David Beckmann	Trident	11	+0.918	2	7.5
4	1	(Australia) Oscar Piastri	Prema Racing	11	+1.698	4	6
5	12	(United Kingdom) Olli Caldwell	Trident	11	+2.087	8	5
6	3	(United States) Logan Sargeant	Prema Racing	11	+2.551	3	4
7	17	(Netherlands) Richard Verschoor	MP Motorsport	11	+2.999	11	3
8	5	(New Zealand) Liam Lawson	Hitech Grand Prix	11	+3.406	10	2
9	7	(France) Théo Pourchaire	ART Grand Prix	11	+4.031	5	1
10	15	(United Kingdom) Jake Hughes	HWA Racelab	11	+4.436	16	0.5
11	29	(Australia) Alex Peroni	Campos Racing	11	+4.982	7	
12	25	(Germany) David Schumacher	Charouz Racing System	11	+5.676	17	
13	9	(Venezuela) Sebastián Fernández	ART Grand Prix	11	+6.074 (Crash)	9	
14	4	(United Kingdom) Max Fewtrell	Hitech Grand Prix	11	+6.366	13	
15	14	(Brazil) Enzo Fittipaldi	HWA Racelab	11	+6.771	22	
16	19	(Austria) Lukas Dunner	MP Motorsport	11	+7.260	15	
17	23	(Czech Republic) Roman Staněk	Charouz Racing System	11	+7.876	19	
18	6	(Norway) Dennis Hauger	Hitech Grand Prix	11	+8.631	20	
19	27	(United Kingdom) Enaam Ahmed	Carlin Buzz Racing	11	+9.319	27	
20	18	(Netherlands) Bent Viscaal	MP Motorsport	11	+9.783	18	
21	31	(Germany) Sophia Flörsch	Campos Racing	11	+10.731	21	
22	16	(Australia) Jack Doohan	HWA Racelab	11	+11.186	23	
23	22	(Italy) Matteo Nannini	Jenzer Motorsport	11	+11.815	14	
24	28	(United States) Cameron Das	Carlin Buzz Racing	11	+13.078	28	
25	20	(Australia) Calan Williams	Jenzer Motorsport	11	+13.531	26	
26	24	(Brazil) Igor Fraga	Charouz Racing System	11	+13.834	24	
27	30	(Italy) Alessio Deledda	Campos Racing	11	+15.189	30	
28	21	(Italy) Federico Malvestiti	Jenzer Motorsport	11	+15.687	29	
29	26	(France) Clément Novalak	Carlin Buzz Racing	10	+1 lap (Crash)	25	
DNF	8	(Russia) Aleksandr Smolyar	ART Grand Prix	3	Collision	12	
Fastest lap set by (Denmark) Frederik Vesti: 1:33.358 (lap 3)

=== Sprint Race ===
Pos.	No.	Driver	Team	Laps	Time/Retired	Grid	Pts.
1	7	(France) Théo Pourchaire	ART Grand Prix	24	38:25.185	2	15
2	3	(United States) Logan Sargeant	Prema Racing	24	+0.464	4	12
3	11	(Germany) David Beckmann	Trident	24	+0.674	8	10
4	17	(Netherlands) Richard Verschoor	MP Motorsport	24	+1.102	4	8
5	1	(Australia) Oscar Piastri	Prema Racing	24	+1.805	7	6 (2)
6	12	(United Kingdom) Olli Caldwell	Trident	24	+1.876	6	5
7	4	(United Kingdom) Max Fewtrell	Hitech Grand Prix	24	+2.197	14	4
8	2	(Denmark) Frederik Vesti	Prema Racing	24	+2.594	10	3
9	9	(Venezuela) Sebastián Fernández	ART Grand Prix	24	+3.017	13	2
10	10	(Germany) Lirim Zendeli	Trident	24	+3.324	9	1
11	29	(Australia) Alex Peroni	Campos Racing	24	+3.662	11	
12	6	(Norway) Dennis Hauger	Hitech Grand Prix	24	+3.968	18	
13	14	(Brazil) Enzo Fittipaldi	HWA Racelab	24	+4.263	15	
14	24	(Brazil) Igor Fraga	Charouz Racing System	24	+4.540	26	
15	27	(United Kingdom) Enaam Ahmed	Carlin Buzz Racing	24	+5.398	19	
16	18	(Netherlands) Bent Viscaal	MP Motorsport	24	+5.786	20	
17	25	(Germany) David Schumacher	Charouz Racing System	24	+6.412	12	
18	19	(Austria) Lukas Dunner	MP Motorsport	24	+8.379	16	
19	16	(Australia) Jack Doohan	HWA Racelab	24	+8.588	22	
20	8	(Russia) Aleksandr Smolyar	ART Grand Prix	24	+8.924	30	
21	30	(Italy) Alessio Deledda	Campos Racing	24	+9.736	27	
22	21	(Italy) Federico Malvestiti	Jenzer Motorsport	24	+10.011	28	
23	20	(Australia) Calan Williams	Jenzer Motorsport	24	+11.342	25	
24	23	(Czech Republic) Roman Staněk	Charouz Racing System	24	+36.592^{1}	17	
25	26	(France) Clément Novalak	Carlin Buzz Racing	23	+1 lap	29	
DNF	5	(New Zealand) Liam Lawson	Hitech Grand Prix	20	Collision	3	
DNF	15	(United Kingdom) Jake Hughes	HWA Racelab	20	Collision	1	
DNF	28	(United States) Cameron Das	Carlin Buzz Racing	19	Mechanical	24	
DNF	31	(Germany) Sophia Flörsch	Campos Racing	10	Collision	21	
NC	22	(Italy) Matteo Nannini	Jenzer Motorsport	7	+17 laps	23	
Fastest lap set by (Australia) Oscar Piastri: 1:20.968 (lap 20)

Notes

- ^1 – Roman Staněk was given a 30-second time penalty for a formation lap safety car infraction.

== Standings after the event ==
Drivers' Championship standings

	Pos.	Driver	Points
	1	(Australia) Oscar Piastri	44
3	2	(Denmark) Frederik Vesti	37.5
	3	(United States) Logan Sargeant	34
4	4	(Germany) David Beckmann	31.5
1	5	(Netherlands) Richard Verschoor	27

Teams' Championship standings

	Pos.	Team	Points
	1	(Italy) Prema Racing	115.5
	2	(Italy) Trident	67.5
	3	(United Kingdom) Hitech Grand Prix	30
3	4	(France) ART Grand Prix	28
	5	(Netherlands) MP Motorsport	27

- Note: Only the top five positions are included for both sets of standings.

== See also ==
- 2020 Styrian Grand Prix
- 2020 2nd Red Bull Ring FIA Formula 2 round

Previous round: 2020 Spielberg Formula 3 round	FIA Formula 3 Championship; 2020 season	Next round: 2020 Budapest Formula 3 round
Previous round: 2020 Spielberg Formula 3 round	Spielberg Formula 3 round	Next round: 2021 Spielberg Formula 3 round
