= 2019 Formula Regional European Championship =

Motor racing competition

The 2019 Formula Regional European Championship was a multi-event, Formula 3 open-wheel single seater motor racing championship held across Europe. The championship features a mix of professional and amateur drivers, competing in Formula 3 cars that conform to the FIA Formula 3 regulations for the championship. In the inaugural season of the championship, Frederik Vesti was the drivers' champion.

The season commenced on 14 April at Circuit Paul Ricard and concluded on 20 October at Autodromo Nazionale Monza, after eight meetings.

== Teams and drivers ==
All teams and drivers competed with the Tatuus-Alfa Romeo F.3 T-318.

Team	No.	Drivers	Status	Rounds
(Italy) Prema Powerteam	2	(Denmark) Frederik Vesti	R	All
(Italy) Prema Powerteam	64	(United Kingdom) Olli Caldwell	R	All
(Italy) Prema Powerteam	74	(Brazil) Enzo Fittipaldi	R	All
(Finland) KIC Motorsport	6	(Finland) Niko Kari		8
(Finland) KIC Motorsport	10	(Finland) Konsta Lappalainen	R	All
(Finland) KIC Motorsport	11	(United Kingdom) Jake Hughes		7
(Finland) KIC Motorsport	46	(Finland) Isac Blomqvist (Note: Blomqvist is a Swedish driver racing with a Finnish license.)	R	1–5
(Switzerland) Scorace Team-Viola Formula	7	(Switzerland) Sharon Scolari		All
(Italy) Scuderia DF Corse by Corbetta	15	(Italy) Matteo Nannini (Note: Nannini was not eligible to classify or score points at Vallelunga due to age restrictions. This points restriction also included the Vallelunga make-up race at Imola.)	R	4–7
(Italy) Scuderia DF Corse by Corbetta	115	(Italy) Matteo Nannini	G	2
(Portugal) DR Formula RP Motorsport	17	(Brazil) Igor Fraga		All
(Portugal) DR Formula RP Motorsport	41	(Mexico) Raúl Guzmán	R	All
(France) Mas du Clos Racing Team	25	(France) Alexandre Bardinon	R	2
(Netherlands) Van Amersfoort Racing	25	(France) Alexandre Bardinon		3–8
(Netherlands) Van Amersfoort Racing	65	(United Kingdom) Dan Ticktum		6–7
(Netherlands) Van Amersfoort Racing	66	(Germany) Andreas Estner		8
(Netherlands) Van Amersfoort Racing	96	(Australia) Joey Mawson		2
(Netherlands) Van Amersfoort Racing	99	(Germany) Sophia Flörsch		All
(Germany) US Racing	27	(Germany) David Schumacher	R	All
(Germany) US Racing	28	(Argentina) Marcos Siebert		2–5
(Germany) US Racing	44	(Germany) Lirim Zendeli		7
(Italy) Technorace	95	(Czech Republic) Tom Beckhäuser	R	3–5, 7–8

Icon	Status
R	Rookie
G	Guest

== Race calendar ==
The provisional calendar was announced on 31 October 2018. The schedule was altered on 9 November 2018 with Hockenheimring replaced by Circuit Paul Ricard, and on 1 December 2018, with the round at Autodromo Enzo e Dino Ferrari moved from its original 9 June date. The last two race weekends of the season at Monza and Mugello were swapped. The cancelled race from Vallelunga Circuit was rescheduled and run at Autodromo Enzo e Dino Ferrari in Round 5 as a fourth race.

Round		Circuit	Date	Supporting
1	R1	(France) Circuit Paul Ricard	13 April	European Le Mans Series
1	R2	(France) Circuit Paul Ricard	13 April	European Le Mans Series
1	R3	(France) Circuit Paul Ricard	14 April	European Le Mans Series
2	R1	(Italy) Vallelunga Circuit	4 May	Main event
2	R2	(Italy) Vallelunga Circuit	5 May	Main event
2	R3	(Italy) Vallelunga Circuit	5 May	Main event
3	R1	(Hungary) Hungaroring	6 July	Euroformula Open
3	R2	(Hungary) Hungaroring	7 July	Euroformula Open
3	R3	(Hungary) Hungaroring	7 July	Euroformula Open
4	R1	(Austria) Red Bull Ring	13 July	International GT Open
4	R2	(Austria) Red Bull Ring	14 July	International GT Open
4	R3	(Austria) Red Bull Ring	14 July	International GT Open
5	R1	(Italy) Autodromo Enzo e Dino Ferrari	31 August	Main event
5	R2	(Italy) Autodromo Enzo e Dino Ferrari	31 August	Main event
5	R3	(Italy) Autodromo Enzo e Dino Ferrari	1 September	Main event
5	R4	(Italy) Autodromo Enzo e Dino Ferrari	1 September	Main event
6	R1	(Spain) Circuit de Barcelona-Catalunya	21 September	International GT Open
6	R2	(Spain) Circuit de Barcelona-Catalunya	21 September	International GT Open
6	R3	(Spain) Circuit de Barcelona-Catalunya	22 September	International GT Open
7	R1	(Italy) Mugello Circuit	5 October	Main event
7	R2	(Italy) Mugello Circuit	5 October	Main event
7	R3	(Italy) Mugello Circuit	6 October	Main event
8	R1	(Italy) Autodromo Nazionale Monza	19 October	Main event
8	R2	(Italy) Autodromo Nazionale Monza	20 October	Main event
8	R3	(Italy) Autodromo Nazionale Monza	20 October	Main event

== Results ==
Round		Circuit	Pole position	Fastest lap	Winning driver	Winning team	Rookie winner
1	R1	(France) Circuit Paul Ricard	(Brazil) Enzo Fittipaldi	(Brazil) Enzo Fittipaldi	(Denmark) Frederik Vesti	(Italy) Prema Powerteam	(Denmark) Frederik Vesti
1	R2	(France) Circuit Paul Ricard	(United Kingdom) Olli Caldwell	(Brazil) Enzo Fittipaldi	(Brazil) Enzo Fittipaldi	(Italy) Prema Powerteam	(Brazil) Enzo Fittipaldi
1	R3	(France) Circuit Paul Ricard	(Denmark) Frederik Vesti	(Denmark) Frederik Vesti	(Denmark) Frederik Vesti	(Italy) Prema Powerteam	(Denmark) Frederik Vesti
2	R1	(Italy) Vallelunga Circuit	(Germany) David Schumacher (Note: Isac Blomqvist was the fastest qualifier but received a grid penalty from an incident during one of the earlier sessions.)	(Brazil) Enzo Fittipaldi	(Germany) David Schumacher	(Germany) US Racing	(Germany) David Schumacher
2	R2	(Italy) Vallelunga Circuit	(Finland) Isac Blomqvist	(Brazil) Igor Fraga	(Denmark) Frederik Vesti	(Italy) Prema Powerteam	(Denmark) Frederik Vesti
2	R3	(Italy) Vallelunga Circuit	(Finland) Isac Blomqvist	Race postponed due to weather conditions			
3	R1	(Hungary) Hungaroring	(Denmark) Frederik Vesti	(Denmark) Frederik Vesti	(Denmark) Frederik Vesti	(Italy) Prema Powerteam	(Denmark) Frederik Vesti
3	R2	(Hungary) Hungaroring	(Denmark) Frederik Vesti	(Brazil) Enzo Fittipaldi	(Denmark) Frederik Vesti	(Italy) Prema Powerteam	(Denmark) Frederik Vesti
3	R3	(Hungary) Hungaroring	(Denmark) Frederik Vesti	(Argentina) Marcos Siebert	(Denmark) Frederik Vesti	(Italy) Prema Powerteam	(Denmark) Frederik Vesti
4	R1	(Austria) Red Bull Ring	(Denmark) Frederik Vesti	(Denmark) Frederik Vesti	(Denmark) Frederik Vesti	(Italy) Prema Powerteam	(Denmark) Frederik Vesti
4	R2	(Austria) Red Bull Ring	(Denmark) Frederik Vesti	(Denmark) Frederik Vesti	(Denmark) Frederik Vesti	(Italy) Prema Powerteam	(Denmark) Frederik Vesti
4	R3	(Austria) Red Bull Ring	(Denmark) Frederik Vesti	(Germany) Sophia Flörsch	(Brazil) Igor Fraga	(Portugal) DR Formula	(Brazil) Enzo Fittipaldi
5	R1	(Italy) Autodromo Enzo e Dino Ferrari	(Brazil) Igor Fraga	(Denmark) Frederik Vesti	(Brazil) Igor Fraga	(Portugal) DR Formula	(United Kingdom) Olli Caldwell
5	R2	(Italy) Autodromo Enzo e Dino Ferrari	(Denmark) Frederik Vesti	(Denmark) Frederik Vesti	(Denmark) Frederik Vesti	(Italy) Prema Powerteam	(Denmark) Frederik Vesti
5	R3	(Italy) Autodromo Enzo e Dino Ferrari	(Denmark) Frederik Vesti	(Denmark) Frederik Vesti	(Brazil) Enzo Fittipaldi	(Italy) Prema Powerteam	(Brazil) Enzo Fittipaldi
5	R4	(Italy) Autodromo Enzo e Dino Ferrari	(Finland) Isac Blomqvist	(Denmark) Frederik Vesti	(United Kingdom) Olli Caldwell	(Italy) Prema Powerteam	(United Kingdom) Olli Caldwell
6	R1	(Spain) Circuit de Barcelona-Catalunya	(Brazil) Enzo Fittipaldi	(Germany) David Schumacher	(Denmark) Frederik Vesti	(Italy) Prema Powerteam	(Denmark) Frederik Vesti
6	R2	(Spain) Circuit de Barcelona-Catalunya	(Germany) David Schumacher	(Germany) David Schumacher	(Germany) David Schumacher	(Germany) US Racing	(Germany) David Schumacher
6	R3	(Spain) Circuit de Barcelona-Catalunya	(Germany) David Schumacher	(Italy) Matteo Nannini	(Germany) David Schumacher	(Germany) US Racing	(Germany) David Schumacher
7	R1	(Italy) Mugello Circuit	(Denmark) Frederik Vesti	(Denmark) Frederik Vesti	(Denmark) Frederik Vesti	(Italy) Prema Powerteam	(Denmark) Frederik Vesti
7	R2	(Italy) Mugello Circuit	(Germany) David Schumacher	(United Kingdom) Jake Hughes	(Denmark) Frederik Vesti	(Italy) Prema Powerteam	(Denmark) Frederik Vesti
7	R3	(Italy) Mugello Circuit	(Germany) David Schumacher	(Germany) David Schumacher	(Germany) David Schumacher	(Germany) US Racing	(Germany) David Schumacher
8	R1	(Italy) Autodromo Nazionale Monza	(Brazil) Igor Fraga	(Brazil) Igor Fraga	(Brazil) Igor Fraga	(Portugal) DR Formula	(Denmark) Frederik Vesti
8	R2	(Italy) Autodromo Nazionale Monza	(Brazil) Igor Fraga	(Brazil) Igor Fraga	(Brazil) Igor Fraga	(Portugal) DR Formula	(Mexico) Raúl Guzmán
8	R3	(Italy) Autodromo Nazionale Monza	(Brazil) Igor Fraga	(Brazil) Enzo Fittipaldi	(Denmark) Frederik Vesti	(Italy) Prema Powerteam	(Denmark) Frederik Vesti

== Championship standings ==
Points are awarded to the top 10 classified finishers in each race. No points are awarded for pole position or fastest lap.

Position	**1st**	**2nd**	**3rd**	**4th**	**5th**	**6th**	**7th**	**8th**	**9th**	**10th**
Points	25	18	15	12	10	8	6	4	2	1

=== Drivers' standings ===
Pos	Driver	LEC (France)			VLL (Italy)			HUN (Hungary)			RBR (Austria)			IMO (Italy)				CAT (Spain)			MUG (Italy)			MNZ (Italy)			Pts
Pos	Driver	R1	R2	R3	R1	R2	R3	R1	R2	R3	R1	R2	R3	R1	R2	R3	R4	R1	R2	R3	R1	R2	R3	R1	R2	R3	Pts
1	(Denmark) Frederik Vesti	1	2	**1**	5	1	C	**1**	**1**	**1**	**1**	**1**	**3**	3	**1**	**3**	6	1	3	10	**1**	1	4	2	3	1	467
2	(Brazil) Enzo Fittipaldi	**2**	1	2	2	2	C	2	2	3	4	5	2	4	7	1	Ret	**5**	2	3	4	4	6	13†	4	2	336
3	(Brazil) Igor Fraga	3	3	7	7	8	C	5	DNS	4	2	9	1	**1**	3	2	3	10	4	7	5	5	5	**1**	**1**	**3**	300
4	(Germany) David Schumacher	8	6	3	**1**	7	C	6	5	7	3	2	6	8	5	6	4	3	**1**	**1**	2	**14**	**1**	7	7	6	285
5	(United Kingdom) Olli Caldwell	4	**DSQ**	4	8	3	C	3	3	2	7	Ret	7	2	2	Ret	1	7	6	4	9	11	10	5	8	7	213
6	(Mexico) Raúl Guzmán	5	4	8	6	9	C	8	7	5	5	Ret	4	5	4	7	12	4	7	6	10	12	8	3	2	5	180
7	(Germany) Sophia Flörsch	9	8	5	9	5	C	7	4	6	6	6	5	7	8	4	7	9	8	5	6	8	9	6	10	9	149
8	(Argentina) Marcos Siebert				3	13†	C	4	6	10	11	4	10	Ret	10	5	5										70
9	(United Kingdom) Dan Ticktum																	2	5	2	8	6	7				64
10	(Finland) Isac Blomqvist	6	5	Ret	11	**6**	**C**	9	8	8	10	11	8	9	11	12	**2**										62
11	(Finland) Konsta Lappalainen	7	7	Ret	12	11	C	10	9	Ret	12	3	9	11	9	8	8	Ret	9	8	12	9	13	9	9	10	56
12	(United Kingdom) Jake Hughes																				3	3	3				45
13	(Italy) Matteo Nannini				10	10	C				8	8	11	6	6	9	9	6	10	9	11	7	11				43
14	(Germany) Lirim Zendeli																				7	2	2				42
15	(Finland) Niko Kari																							8	5	4	26
16	(Australia) Joey Mawson				4	4	C																				24
17	(Germany) Andreas Estner																							4	6	8	24
18	(Switzerland) Sharon Scolari	10	9	6	14	Ret	C	13	11	11	13	10	12	13	14	11	11	8	12	Ret	Ret	DNS	Ret	12	13	DNS	17
19	(Czech Republic) Tom Beckhäuser							12	10	DNS	9	7	Ret	10	12	10					13	10	14	11	12	12	12
20	(France) Alexandre Bardinon				13	12	C	11	Ret	9	Ret	Ret	DNS	12	13	Ret	10	11	11	11	14	13	12	10	11	11	5
Pos	Driver	R1	R2	R3	R1	R2	R3	R1	R2	R3	R1	R2	R3	R1	R2	R3	R4	R1	R2	R3	R1	R2	R3	R1	R2	R3	Pts
Pos	Driver	LEC (France)			VLL (Italy)			HUN (Hungary)			RBR (Austria)			IMO (Italy)				CAT (Spain)			MUG (Italy)			MNZ (Italy)			Pts

Colour	Result
Gold	Winner
Silver	Second place
Bronze	Third place
Green	Points classification
Blue	Non-points classification
Blue	Non-classified finish (NC)
Purple	Retired, not classified (Ret)
Red	Did not qualify (DNQ)
Red	Did not pre-qualify (DNPQ)
Black	Disqualified (DSQ)
White	Did not start (DNS)
White	Withdrew (WD)
White	Race cancelled (C)
Blank	Did not practice (DNP)
Blank	Did not arrive (DNA)
Blank	Excluded (EX)

**Bold** – Pole
Italics – Fastest Lap
† — Did not finish, but classified

=== Rookies' standings ===
Pos	Driver	LEC (France)			VLL (Italy)			HUN (Hungary)			RBR (Austria)			IMO (Italy)				CAT (Spain)			MUG (Italy)			MNZ (Italy)			Pts
Pos	Driver	R1	R2	R3	R1	R2	R3	R1	R2	R3	R1	R2	R3	R1	R2	R3	R4	R1	R2	R3	R1	R2	R3	R1	R2	R3	Pts
1	(Denmark) Frederik Vesti	1	2	1	5	1	C	1	1	1	1	1	3	3	1	3	6	1	3	10	1	1	4	2	3	1	506
2	(Brazil) Enzo Fittipaldi	2	1	2	2	2	C	2	2	3	4	5	2	4	7	1	Ret	5	2	3	4	4	6	13†	4	2	381
3	(Germany) David Schumacher	8	6	3	1	7	C	6	5	7	3	2	6	8	5	6	4	3	1	1	2	14	1	7	7	6	347
4	(United Kingdom) Olli Caldwell	4	DSQ	4	8	3	C	3	3	2	7	Ret	7	2	2	Ret	1	7	6	4	9	11	10	5	8	7	288
5	(Mexico) Raúl Guzmán	5	4	8	6	9	C	8	7	5	5	Ret	4	5	4	7	12	4	7	6	10	12	8	3	2	5	284
6	(Finland) Konsta Lappalainen	7	7	Ret	12	11	C	10	9	Ret	12	3	9	11	9	8	8	Ret	9	8	12	9	13	9	9	10	157
7	(Finland) Isac Blomqvist	6	5	Ret	11	6	C	9	8	8	10	11	8	9	11	12	2										116
8	(Italy) Matteo Nannini				10	10	C				8	8	11	6	6	9	9	6	10	9	11	7	11				103
9	(France) Alexandre Bardinon				13	12	C	11	Ret	9	Ret	Ret	DNS	12	13	Ret	10	11	11	11	14	13	12	10	11	11	74
10	(Czech Republic) Tom Beckhäuser							12	10	DNS	9	7	Ret	10	12	10					13	10	14	11	12	12	64
Pos	Driver	R1	R2	R3	R1	R2	R3	R1	R2	R3	R1	R2	R3	R1	R2	R3	R4	R1	R2	R3	R1	R2	R3	R1	R2	R3	Pts
Pos	Driver	LEC (France)			VLL (Italy)			HUN (Hungary)			RBR (Austria)			IMO (Italy)				CAT (Spain)			MUG (Italy)			MNZ (Italy)			Pts

=== Teams' standings ===
Pos	Team	Pts
1	(Italy) Prema Powerteam	870
2	(Portugal) DR Formula	480
3	(Germany) US Racing	397
4	(Netherlands) Van Amersfoort Racing	264
5	(Finland) KIC Motorsport	189
6	(Italy) Scuderia DF Corse by Corbetta	43
7	(Switzerland) Scorace Team-Viola Formula	17
8	(Italy) Technorace	12
9	(France) Mas du Clos Racing Team	0
