= 2019 Pau Grand Prix =

Race details
- Date: 19 May 2019
- Official name: LXXVIII Pau Grand Prix
- Location: Pau, France
- Course: Temporary Street Circuit
- Course length: 2.760 km (1.720 miles)
- Distance: 24 laps, 66.240 km (41.280 miles)
- Weather: Varying

Pole position
Driver	(Germany) Julian Hanses	Team Motopark
- Time: 1:11.479

Fastest lap
Driver	(Austria) Lukas Dunner	Teo Martín Motorsport
- Time: 1:20.993 on lap 21

Podium
First	(United Kingdom) Billy Monger	Carlin Motorsport
Second	(Denmark) Nicolai Kjærgaard	Carlin Motorsport
Third	(Japan) Yuki Tsunoda	Team Motopark

The 2019 Pau Grand Prix was a Formula Three motor race held on 19 May 2019 at the Pau circuit, in Pau, Pyrénées-Atlantiques, France. The Grand Prix was run as the second round of the 2019 Euroformula Open Championship. The Grand Prix was won by Billy Monger.

== Entry list ==
All teams utilize the Dallara F317 chassis.

Team	No.	Driver	Engine
(United Kingdom) Double R Racing	7	(Australia) Jack Doohan	Mercedes-Benz
(United Kingdom) Double R Racing	26	(Sweden) Linus Lundqvist	Mercedes-Benz
(Spain) Teo Martín Motorsport	8	(Austria) Lukas Dunner	Mercedes-Benz
(Spain) Teo Martín Motorsport	51	(Italy) Aldo Festante	Mercedes-Benz
(Spain) Teo Martín Motorsport	77	(Brazil) Guilherme Samaia	Mercedes-Benz
(United Kingdom) Carlin Motorsport	11	(Japan) Teppei Natori	Volkswagen
(United Kingdom) Carlin Motorsport	12	(Brazil) Christian Hahn	Volkswagen
(United Kingdom) Carlin Motorsport	31	(United Kingdom) Billy Monger	Volkswagen
(United Kingdom) Carlin Motorsport	63	(Denmark) Nicolai Kjærgaard	Volkswagen
(Germany) Team Motopark	14	(Japan) Yuki Tsunoda	Volkswagen
(Germany) Team Motopark	18	(Germany) Julian Hanses	Volkswagen
(Germany) Team Motopark	30	(New Zealand) Liam Lawson	Volkswagen
(Germany) Team Motopark	33	(Japan) Marino Sato	Volkswagen
(United Kingdom) Fortec Motorsports	20	(United States) Cameron Das	Mercedes-Benz
(United Kingdom) Fortec Motorsports	21	(Australia) Calan Williams	Mercedes-Benz
(Spain) Drivex School	99	(Angola) Rui Andrade	Toyota

== Results ==
=== Qualifying (Race 1) ===
Pos	No.	Driver	Team	Time	Gap	Grid
1	30	(New Zealand) Liam Lawson	Team Motopark	1:10.504		1
2	33	(Japan) Marino Sato	Team Motopark	1:10.846	+ 0.342 s	2
3	18	(Germany) Julian Hanses	Team Motopark	1:10.849	+ 0.345 s	3
4	8	(Austria) Lukas Dunner	Teo Martín Motorsport	1:10.932	+ 0.428 s	4
5	14	(Japan) Yuki Tsunoda	Team Motopark	1:11.093	+ 0.589 s	5
6	63	(Denmark) Nicolai Kjærgaard	Carlin Motorsport	1:11.161	+ 0.657 s	6
7	12	(Brazil) Christian Hahn	Carlin Motorsport	1:11.208	+ 0.704 s	7
8	26	(Sweden) Linus Lundqvist	Double R Racing	1:11.237	+ 0.733 s	8
9	77	(Brazil) Guilherme Samaia	Teo Martín Motorsport	1:11.440	+ 0.936 s	9
10	31	(United Kingdom) Billy Monger	Carlin Motorsport	1:11.486	+ 0.982 s	10
11	51	(Italy) Aldo Festante	Teo Martín Motorsport	1:11.722	+ 1.218 s	11
12	7	(Australia) Jack Doohan	Double R Racing	1:11.806	+ 1.302 s	12
13	20	(United States) Cameron Das	Fortec Motorsports	1:11.860	+ 1.356 s	13
14	11	(Japan) Teppei Natori	Carlin Motorsport	1:12.844	+ 2.340 s	14
15	21	(Australia) Calan Williams	Fortec Motorsports	1:12.975	+ 2.471 s	15
16	99	(Angola) Rui Andrade	Drivex School	1:14.121	+ 3.617 s	16

=== Race 1 ===
Liam Lawson produced a dominant effort in winning the first race of the weekend, with Team Motopark team-mates Julian Hanses and Marino Sato finishing second and third respectively. Several drivers started the race on wet tyres, gambling on a potential downpour later on in the race. The weather would remain dry and those who gambled on the wet tyres would begin to tumble down the field. Kjærgaard, Tsunoda and Hahn all fell victim to the narrow nature of the circuit, retiring due to accident damage.

Pos	No.	Driver	Team	Laps	Time / Retired	Grid
1	30	(New Zealand) Liam Lawson	Team Motopark	27	32min 36.615sec	1
2	18	(Germany) Julian Hanses	Team Motopark	27	+ 16.100 s	3
3	33	(Japan) Marino Sato	Team Motopark	27	+ 18.595 s	2
4	8	(Austria) Lukas Dunner	Teo Martín Motorsport	27	+ 19.364 s	4
5	26	(Sweden) Linus Lundqvist	Double R Racing	27	+ 39.865 s	8
6	20	(United States) Cameron Das	Fortec Motorsports	27	+ 40.235 s	13
7	21	(Australia) Calan Williams	Fortec Motorsports	27	+ 59.927 s	15
8	51	(Italy) Aldo Festante	Teo Martín Motorsport	27	+ 1 lap	11
9	31	(United Kingdom) Billy Monger	Carlin Motorsport	27	+ 1 lap	10
10	77	(Brazil) Guilherme Samaia	Teo Martín Motorsport	27	+ 1 lap	9
11	99	(Angola) Rui Andrade	Drivex School	27	+ 2 laps	16
12	7	(Australia) Jack Doohan	Double R Racing	27	+ 5 laps	12
Ret	63	(Denmark) Nicolai Kjærgaard	Carlin Motorsport	12	Accident	6
Ret	33	(Japan) Yuki Tsunoda	Team Motopark	10	Suspension	5
Ret	12	(Brazil) Christian Hahn	Carlin Motorsport	7	Accident	7

=== Qualifying (Grand Prix) ===
Pos	No.	Driver	Team	Time	Gap	Grid
1	18	(Germany) Julian Hanses	Team Motopark	1:11.479		1
2	14	(Japan) Yuki Tsunoda	Team Motopark	1:11.531	+ 0.052 s	2
3	33	(Japan) Marino Sato	Team Motopark	1:11.531	+ 0.052 s	3
4	30	(New Zealand) Liam Lawson	Team Motopark	1:11.572	+ 0.093 s	4
5	12	(Brazil) Christian Hahn	Carlin Motorsport	1:11.765	+ 0.286 s	5
6	11	(Japan) Teppei Natori	Carlin Motorsport	1:11.904	+ 0.425 s	6
7	20	(United States) Cameron Das	Fortec Motorsport	1:11.931	+ 0.452 s	7
8	8	(Austria) Lukas Dunner	Teo Martín Motorsport	1:11.967	+ 0.488 s	8
9	26	(Sweden) Linus Lundqvist	Double R Racing	1:11.972	+ 0.493 s	9
10	77	(Brazil) Guilherme Samaia	Teo Martín Motorsport	1:12.171	+ 0.692 s	10
11	31	(United Kingdom) Billy Monger	Carlin Motorsport	1:12.216	+ 0.737 s	11
12	7	(Australia) Jack Doohan	Double R Racing	1:12.322	+ 0.843 s	12
13	21	(Australia) Calan Williams	Fortec Motorsport	1:12.755	+ 1.276 s	13
14	63	(Denmark) Nicolai Kjærgaard	Carlin Motorsport	1:12.853	+ 1.374 s	14
15	51	(Italy) Aldo Festante	Teo Martín Motorsport	1:14.075	+ 2.596 s	15
16	99	(Angola) Rui Andrade	Drivex School	1:14.725	+ 3.246 s	16

=== Race 2 (Grand Prix) ===
Pos	No.	Driver	Team	Laps	Time / Retired	Grid
1	31	(United Kingdom) Billy Monger	Carlin Motorsport	24	36min 09.378sec	11
2	63	(Denmark) Nicolai Kjærgaard	Carlin Motorsport	24	+ 1.121 s	14
3	14	(Japan) Yuki Tsunoda	Team Motopark	24	+ 1.630 s	2
4	8	(Austria) Lukas Dunner	Teo Martín Motorsport	24	+ 8.983 s	8
5	12	(Brazil) Christian Hahn	Carlin Motorsport	24	+ 18.506 s	5
6	33	(Japan) Marino Sato	Team Motopark	24	+ 23.251 s	3
7	11	(Japan) Teppei Natori	Carlin Motorsport	24	+ 24.146 s	6
8	20	(United States) Cameron Das	Fortec Motorsport	24	+ 37.788 s	7
9	77	(Brazil) Guilherme Samaia	Teo Martín Motorsport	24	+ 38.729 s	10
10	51	(Italy) Aldo Festante	Teo Martín Motorsport	24	+ 39.499 s	16
11	21	(Australia) Calan Williams	Fortec Motorsport	23	+ 1 lap	13
Ret	26	(Sweden) Linus Lundqvist	Double R Racing	17	Retired	9
Ret	18	(Germany) Julian Hanses	Team Motopark	14	Accident	1
Ret	30	(New Zealand) Liam Lawson	Team Motopark	14	Accident	4
Ret	7	(Australia) Jack Doohan	Double R Racing	3	Retired	12
Ret	99	(Angola) Rui Andrade	Drivex School	0	Retired	16

Preceded by 2018 Pau Grand Prix	Pau Grand Prix; 2019	Succeeded by 2022 Pau Grand Prix
