= 2019 Euroformula Open Championship =

Multi-event motor racing championship

The 2019 Euroformula Open Championship was a multi-event motor racing championship for single-seat open wheel formula racing cars that held across Europe. The championship features drivers competing in two-litre Formula Three racing cars built by Italian constructor Dallara which conform to the technical regulations, or formula, for the championship. It was the sixth Euroformula Open Championship season.

For the first time since its inception, the championship featured multiple power unit manufacturers, allowing the use of Mercedes and Volkswagen engines. It was intended to have equalised performance of the powerplants, in terms of both power and torque like in the GT3 racing. But the equalisation was not successful as the teams that used Toyota engine which was tuned by Piedrafita had a lack of power in comparison with Mercedes and Volkswagen engines. The situation led to the withdrawal of the teams after the first round and switching to the Mercedes and Volkswagen engine prior round at Spa.

Team Motopark driver Marino Sato won the title after the first race at Barcelona, having won eight races, including series of six wins in row in Spa, Hungaroring and Spielberg, while his team clinched the title after the second Spielberg race. Top rookie Liam Lawson was Sato's closest challenger, winning four races throughout the season. His fellow Red Bull Junior Team stablemate Yuki Tsunoda won a race at the Hockenheimring, Teppei Natori was victorious in the second race at Catalunya, Billy Monger became the first double-amputee to win a race in single-seaters when he won the Pau Grand Prix, and Toshiki Oyu won both races at a one-off appearance in Silverstone. A standalone winter series round was also held in February at Circuit Paul Ricard, with Linus Lundqvist and Formula 2 driver Nobuharu Matsushita emerging victorious.

== Teams and drivers ==
All teams utilized a Dallara F317 chassis.

Team	Engine	No.	Driver	Status	Rounds
(Italy) RP Motorsport	Toyota	1	(Mexico) Javier González	R	1
(Italy) RP Motorsport	Volkswagen	1	(Mexico) Javier González	R	4–6
(Italy) RP Motorsport	Volkswagen	1	(United States) Kyle Kirkwood	G	9
(Italy) RP Motorsport	Toyota	2	(Russia) Artem Petrov		1
(Italy) RP Motorsport	Toyota	3	(France) Pierre-Louis Chovet	R	1
(Italy) RP Motorsport	Volkswagen	3	(France) Pierre-Louis Chovet	R	4–6
(Italy) RP Motorsport	Volkswagen	3	(Italy) Lorenzo Ferrari	R G	9
(Greece) D. Tsimpris Motorsport	Toyota	5	(Greece) Dimitrios Tsimpris	R	1
(United Kingdom) Carlin Motorsport	Volkswagen	6	(Israel) Ido Cohen	R G	8–9
(United Kingdom) Carlin Motorsport	Volkswagen	11	(Japan) Teppei Natori	R	NC, 1–5, 8–9
(United Kingdom) Carlin Motorsport	Volkswagen	12	(Brazil) Christian Hahn		NC, All
(United Kingdom) Carlin Motorsport	Volkswagen	22	(Japan) Nobuharu Matsushita		NC, 5
(United Kingdom) Carlin Motorsport	Volkswagen	31	(United Kingdom) Billy Monger	R	NC, All
(United Kingdom) Carlin Motorsport	Volkswagen	63	(Denmark) Nicolai Kjærgaard	R	NC, All
(United Kingdom) Double R	Mercedes-Benz	7	(Australia) Jack Doohan	R	All
(United Kingdom) Double R	Mercedes-Benz	26	(Sweden) Linus Lundqvist	R	All
(United Kingdom) Double R	Mercedes-Benz	55	(United Kingdom) Jamie Chadwick		7
(Spain) Teo Martín Motorsport	Mercedes-Benz	8	(Austria) Lukas Dunner		NC, All
(Spain) Teo Martín Motorsport	Mercedes-Benz	51	(Italy) Aldo Festante		NC, 1–6
(Spain) Teo Martín Motorsport	Mercedes-Benz	77	(Brazil) Guilherme Samaia		NC, 1–4
(Spain) Campos Racing	Toyota	9	(Sweden) Linus Lundqvist		NC
(Spain) Campos Racing	Toyota	10	(Italy) Alessio Deledda	R	NC
(Germany) Team Motopark	Volkswagen	14	(Japan) Yuki Tsunoda	R	1–5, 8–9
(Germany) Team Motopark	Volkswagen	14	(Japan) Toshiki Oyu		7
(Germany) Team Motopark	Volkswagen	18	(Germany) Julian Hanses		1–6
(Germany) Team Motopark	Volkswagen	18	(Germany) Niklas Krütten	R	7–9
(Germany) Team Motopark	Volkswagen	25	(United States) Cameron Das		5–9
(Germany) Team Motopark	Volkswagen	30	(New Zealand) Liam Lawson	R	1–5, 8–9
(Germany) Team Motopark	Volkswagen	30	(Norway) Dennis Hauger	R	7
(Germany) Team Motopark	Volkswagen	33	(Japan) Marino Sato		1–6, 8–9
(Germany) Team Motopark	Volkswagen	33	(United Kingdom) Enaam Ahmed		7
(United Kingdom) Fortec Motorsports	Mercedes-Benz	20	(United States) Cameron Das		1–4
(United Kingdom) Fortec Motorsports	Mercedes-Benz	20	(Venezuela) Manuel Maldonado	R	7–8
(United Kingdom) Fortec Motorsports	Mercedes-Benz	21	(Australia) Calan Williams		All
(United Kingdom) CF Racing	Mercedes-Benz	28	(United Kingdom) Stefano Leaney		4
(United Kingdom) CF Racing	Mercedes-Benz	29	(United Kingdom) Stuart Wiltshire		4, 7
(Spain) Drivex School	Toyota	66	(Romania) Petru Florescu		1
(Spain) Drivex School	Toyota	66	(Argentina) Franco Colapinto	R	4
(Spain) Drivex School	Mercedes-Benz	88	(Poland) Filip Kaminiarz	R G	9
(Spain) Drivex School	Toyota	99	(Angola) Rui Andrade	R	All (Note: Rui Andrade raced in the first three races with the Toyota engine before switching to the Mercedes-Benz engine.)
(Spain) Drivex School	Mercedes-Benz	99	(Angola) Rui Andrade	R	All

== Race calendar and results ==
An eight-round provisional calendar was revealed on 31 August 2018. The calendar features six circuits from 2018 schedule. While Autódromo do Estoril and Circuito de Jerez are not present in the current version of the calendar, Hockenheim made its debut as a Euroformula Open Championship round. The date of the Spa round was altered on 29 November 2018. On 10 December 2018 was announced that Pau Grand Prix will make debut in the extended nine-round Euroformula Open Championship schedule.

Round		Circuit	Date	Pole position	Fastest lap	Winning driver	Winning team	Rookie Winner
NC	R1	(France) Circuit Paul Ricard, Le Castellet	23 February	(Japan) Nobuharu Matsushita	(Japan) Nobuharu Matsushita	(Japan) Nobuharu Matsushita	(United Kingdom) Carlin Motorsport	(Japan) Teppei Natori
NC	R2	(France) Circuit Paul Ricard, Le Castellet	23 February		(Denmark) Nicolai Kjærgaard	(Sweden) Linus Lundqvist	(Spain) Campos Racing	(Japan) Teppei Natori
1	R1	(France) Circuit Paul Ricard, Le Castellet	27 April	(Austria) Lukas Dunner	(Brazil) Guilherme Samaia	(New Zealand) Liam Lawson	(Germany) Team Motopark	(New Zealand) Liam Lawson
1	R2	(France) Circuit Paul Ricard, Le Castellet	28 April	(New Zealand) Liam Lawson	(Sweden) Linus Lundqvist	(Japan) Marino Sato	(Germany) Team Motopark	(New Zealand) Liam Lawson
2	R1	(France) Circuit de Pau-Ville	18 May	(New Zealand) Liam Lawson	(Japan) Yuki Tsunoda	(New Zealand) Liam Lawson	(Germany) Team Motopark	(New Zealand) Liam Lawson
2	R2	(France) Circuit de Pau-Ville	19 May	(Germany) Julian Hanses	(Austria) Lukas Dunner	(United Kingdom) Billy Monger	(United Kingdom) Carlin Motorsport	(United Kingdom) Billy Monger
3	R1	(Germany) Hockenheimring	25 May	(Japan) Marino Sato	(Japan) Marino Sato	(Japan) Marino Sato	(Germany) Team Motopark	(Australia) Jack Doohan
3	R2	(Germany) Hockenheimring	26 May	(Japan) Marino Sato	(Japan) Yuki Tsunoda	(Japan) Yuki Tsunoda	(Germany) Team Motopark	(Japan) Yuki Tsunoda
4	R1	(Belgium) Circuit de Spa-Francorchamps	8 June	(Japan) Marino Sato	(Japan) Marino Sato	(Japan) Marino Sato	(Germany) Team Motopark	(Japan) Yuki Tsunoda
4	R2	(Belgium) Circuit de Spa-Francorchamps	9 June	(Japan) Marino Sato	(Japan) Marino Sato	(Japan) Marino Sato	(Germany) Team Motopark	(Australia) Jack Doohan
5	R1	(Hungary) Hungaroring	6 July	(Austria) Lukas Dunner	(Japan) Nobuharu Matsushita	(Japan) Marino Sato	(Germany) Team Motopark	(New Zealand) Liam Lawson
5	R2	(Hungary) Hungaroring	7 July	(Japan) Nobuharu Matsushita	(Austria) Lukas Dunner	(Japan) Marino Sato	(Germany) Team Motopark	(Sweden) Linus Lundqvist
6	R1	(Austria) Red Bull Ring	13 July	(Japan) Marino Sato	(Japan) Marino Sato	(Japan) Marino Sato	(Germany) Team Motopark	(Australia) Jack Doohan
6	R2	(Austria) Red Bull Ring	14 July	(Japan) Marino Sato	(Japan) Marino Sato	(Japan) Marino Sato	(Germany) Team Motopark	(Sweden) Linus Lundqvist
7	R1	(United Kingdom) Silverstone Circuit	7 September	(Japan) Toshiki Oyu	(United Kingdom) Enaam Ahmed	(Japan) Toshiki Oyu	(Germany) Team Motopark	(Japan) Toshiki Oyu
7	R2	(United Kingdom) Silverstone Circuit	8 September	(Japan) Toshiki Oyu	(Denmark) Nicolai Kjærgaard	(Japan) Toshiki Oyu	(Germany) Team Motopark	(Japan) Toshiki Oyu
8	R1	(Spain) Circuit de Barcelona-Catalunya	21 September	(United Kingdom) Billy Monger (Note: The qualifying session for the first Barcelona race was cancelled due to heavy rain; the starting order is based on the Free practice sessions results.)	(New Zealand) Liam Lawson	(New Zealand) Liam Lawson	(Germany) Team Motopark	(New Zealand) Liam Lawson
8	R2	(Spain) Circuit de Barcelona-Catalunya	22 September	(Japan) Teppei Natori	(Japan) Teppei Natori	(Japan) Teppei Natori	(United Kingdom) Carlin Motorsport	(Japan) Teppei Natori
9	R1	(Italy) Autodromo Nazionale Monza	12 October	(Sweden) Linus Lundqvist	(Japan) Yuki Tsunoda	(Japan) Marino Sato	(Germany) Team Motopark	(Japan) Teppei Natori
9	R2	(Italy) Autodromo Nazionale Monza	13 October	(Japan) Teppei Natori	(United States) Cameron Das	(New Zealand) Liam Lawson	(Germany) Team Motopark	(New Zealand) Liam Lawson

== Championship standings ==
=== Drivers' championship ===
- Points were awarded as follows:

1	2	3	4	5	6	7	8	9	10	PP	FL
25	18	15	12	10	8	6	4	2	1	**1**	1

Only the fifteen best race results counted towards the championship.

Pos	Driver	LEC1 (France)		LEC2 (France)		PAU (France)		HOC (Germany)		SPA (Belgium)		HUN (Hungary)		RBR (Austria)		SIL (United Kingdom)		CAT (Spain)		MNZ (Italy)		Pts
Pos	Driver	NC		R1	R2	R1	R2	R1	R2	R1	R2	R1	R2	R1	R2	R1	R2	R1	R2	R1	R2	Pts
1	(Japan) Marino Sato			5	1	3	6	**1**	**2**	**1**	**1**	1	1	**1**	**1**			(10)	5	1	5	307
2	(New Zealand) Liam Lawson			1	**4**	**1**	Ret	3	5	3	Ret	3	10					1	6	Ret	1	179
3	(Austria) Lukas Dunner	5	4	**3**	3	4	4	7	4	Ret	2	**2**	3	3	4	Ret	9	6	(9)	7	7	178
4	(Japan) Yuki Tsunoda			2	6	Ret	3	4	1	2	Ret	4	11					11	7	3	2	151
5	(Sweden) Linus Lundqvist	4	1	4	5	5	Ret	5	Ret	9	7	5	5	5	3	7	(10)	3	8	**5**	4	144
6	(Japan) Teppei Natori	3	3	6	8	DNS	7	11	8	8	6	6	6					9	**1**	2	**3**	115
7	(Denmark) Nicolai Kjærgaard	9	5	11	13	Ret	2	9	6	20	13	15	9	Ret	9	3	3	2	2	4	15	111
8	(Germany) Julian Hanses			7	10	2	**Ret**	6	3	5	3	17	Ret	7	2							98
9	(United Kingdom) Billy Monger	Ret	8	10	12	9	1	12	13	10	11	12	12	11	6	4	4	**5**	3	11	14	89
10	(Brazil) Christian Hahn	2	2	Ret	7	Ret	5	8	Ret	6	5	7	4	10	10	9	14	4	4	12	Ret	84
11	(Australia) Jack Doohan			9	9	12	Ret	2	7	4	4	16	7	2	13	WD	WD	15	10	10	Ret	79
12	(United States) Cameron Das			Ret	15	6	8	10	10	19	18	10	14	9	8	5	6	8	12	6	Ret	54
13	(Australia) Calan Williams			12	16	7	11	15	9	12	8	8	8	4	5	10	7	14	14	16	10	53
14	(Japan) Toshiki Oyu															**1**	**1**					52
15	(United Kingdom) Enaam Ahmed															2	2					37
16	(Brazil) Guilherme Samaia	6	6	8	2	10	9	14	11	11	17											26
17	(Mexico) Javier González			Ret	DNS					7	12	9	16	6	7							22
18	(Japan) Nobuharu Matsushita	**1**	DNS									NC	**2**									20
19	(Norway) Dennis Hauger															6	5					18
20	(Germany) Niklas Krütten															8	8	12	11	8	11	14
21	(Italy) Aldo Festante	7	7	Ret	11	8	10	Ret	Ret	14	10	11	13	8	11							10
22	(Angola) Rui Andrade			15	19	11	Ret	13	12	17	15	14	15	Ret	12	11	12	13	15	Ret	9	6
23	(France) Pierre-Louis Chovet			14	Ret					13	9	13	DNS	Ret	14							2
24	(Venezuela) Manuel Maldonado															12	11	WD	WD			0
25	(United Kingdom) Stuart Wiltshire									18	16					13	13					0
26	(Romania) Petru Florescu			13	18																	0
27	(Argentina) Franco Colapinto									15	14											0
28	(Russia) Artem Petrov			Ret	14																	0
29	(Greece) Dimitrios Tsimpris			16	17																	0
30	(United Kingdom) Stefano Leaney									16	Ret											0
—	(United Kingdom) Jamie Chadwick															DNP	DNP					—
Guest drivers ineligible to score points
	(United States) Kyle Kirkwood																			9	6	0
	(Israel) Ido Cohen																	7	13	13	8	0
	(Italy) Lorenzo Ferrari																			15	12	0
	(Poland) Filip Kaminiarz																			14	13	0
Non-championship round-only drivers
	(Italy) Alessio Deledda	8	9																			0
Pos	Driver	NC		R1	R2	R1	R2	R1	R2	R1	R2	R1	R2	R1	R2	R1	R2	R1	R2	R1	R2	Pts
Pos	Driver	LEC1 (France)		LEC2 (France)		PAU (France)		HOC (Germany)		SPA (Belgium)		HUN (Hungary)		RBR (Austria)		SIL (United Kingdom)		CAT (Spain)		MNZ (Italy)		Pts

Colour	Result
Gold	Winner
Silver	Second place
Bronze	Third place
Green	Points classification
Blue	Non-points classification
Blue	Non-classified finish (NC)
Purple	Retired, not classified (Ret)
Red	Did not qualify (DNQ)
Red	Did not pre-qualify (DNPQ)
Black	Disqualified (DSQ)
White	Did not start (DNS)
White	Withdrew (WD)
White	Race cancelled (C)
Blank	Did not practice (DNP)
Blank	Did not arrive (DNA)
Blank	Excluded (EX)

**Bold** – Pole
Italics – Fastest Lap

=== Rookies' championship ===
- Points were awarded as follows:

1	2	3	4	5
10	8	6	4	3

Pos	Driver	LEC1 (France)		LEC2 (France)		PAU (France)		HOC (Germany)		SPA (Belgium)		HUN (Hungary)		RBR (Austria)		SIL (United Kingdom)		CAT (Spain)		MNZ (Italy)		Pts
Pos	Driver	NC		R1	R2	R1	R2	R1	R2	R1	R2	R1	R2	R1	R2	R1	R2	R1	R2	R1	R2	Pts
1	(New Zealand) Liam Lawson			1	4	1	Ret	3	2	3	Ret	3	10					1	6	Ret	1	92
2	(Sweden) Linus Lundqvist			4	5	5	Ret	5	Ret	9	7	5	5	5	3	7	10	3	8	5	4	83
3	(Japan) Yuki Tsunoda			2	6	Ret	3	4	1	2	Ret	4	11					11	7	3	2	72
4	(Japan) Teppei Natori	3	3	6	8	DNS	7	11	8	8	6	6	6					9	1	2	3	68
5	(Denmark) Nicolai Kjærgaard			11	13	Ret	2	9	6	20	13	15	9	Ret	9	3	3	2	2	4	15	63
6	(Australia) Jack Doohan			9	9	12	Ret	2	7	4	4	16	7	2	13	WD	WD	15	10	10	Ret	55
7	(United Kingdom) Billy Monger			10	12	9	1	12	13	10	11	12	12	11	6	4	4	5	3	11	14	54
8	(Japan) Toshiki Oyu															1	1					20
9	(Mexico) Javier González			Ret	DNS					7	12	9	16	6	7							19
10	(Angola) Rui Andrade			15	19	11	Ret	13	12	17	15	14	15	Ret	12	11	12	13	15	Ret	9	10
11	(Norway) Dennis Hauger															6	5					8
12	(Germany) Niklas Krütten															8	8	12	11	8	11	6
13	(France) Pierre-Louis Chovet			14	Ret					13	9	13	DNS	Ret	14							4
14	(Venezuela) Manuel Maldonado															12	11	WD	WD			0
15	(United Kingdom) Stuart Wiltshire									18	16					13	13					0
16	(Argentina) Franco Colapinto									15	14											0
17	(Greece) Dimitrios Tsimpris			16	17																	0
18	(United Kingdom) Stefano Leaney									16	Ret											0
Guest drivers ineligible to score points
	(Israel) Ido Cohen																	7	13	13	8	0
	(Italy) Lorenzo Ferrari																			15	12	0
	(Poland) Filip Kaminiarz																			14	13	0
Non-championship round-only drivers
	(Italy) Alessio Deledda	8	9																			0
Pos	Driver	NC		R1	R2	R1	R2	R1	R2	R1	R2	R1	R2	R1	R2	R1	R2	R1	R2	R1	R2	Pts
Pos	Driver	LEC1 (France)		LEC2 (France)		PAU (France)		HOC (Germany)		SPA (Belgium)		HUN (Hungary)		RBR (Austria)		SIL (United Kingdom)		CAT (Spain)		MNZ (Italy)		Pts

=== Teams' championship ===
- Points were awarded as follows:

1	2	3	4	5
10	8	6	4	3

Pos	Team	LEC1 (France)		LEC2 (France)		PAU (France)		HOC (Germany)		SPA (Belgium)		HUN (Hungary)		RBR (Austria)		SIL (United Kingdom)		CAT (Spain)		MNZ (Italy)		Pts
Pos	Team	NC		R1	R2	R1	R2	R1	R2	R1	R2	R1	R2	R1	R2	R1	R2	R1	R2	R1	R2	Pts
1	(Germany) Team Motopark			1	1	1	3	1	1	1	1	1	1	1	1	1	1	1	5	1	1	262
1	(Germany) Team Motopark			2	4	2	6	3	2	2	3	3	10	7	2	2	2	8	6	3	2	262
2	(United Kingdom) Carlin Motorsport	1	2	6	7	9	1	8	6	6	5	6	4	10	6	3	3	2	1	2	3	94
2	(United Kingdom) Carlin Motorsport	2	3	10	8	10	2	9	8	8	6	7	6	11	10	4	4	4	2	4	14	94
3	(United Kingdom) Double R			4	5	5	Ret	2	7	4	4	5	5	2	3	7	10	3	8	5	4	65
3	(United Kingdom) Double R			9	9	12	Ret	5	Ret	9	7	16	7	5	13	WD	WD	15	10	10	Ret	65
4	(Spain) Teo Martín Motorsport	5	4	3	2	4	4	7	4	11	2	2	3	3	4	Ret	9	6	9	7	7	64
4	(Spain) Teo Martín Motorsport	6	6	8	3	8	9	14	11	14	10	11	13	8	11							64
5	(United Kingdom) Fortec Motorsport			12	15	6	8	10	9	12	8	8	8	4	5	10	7	14	14	16	10	7
5	(United Kingdom) Fortec Motorsport			Ret	16	7	11	15	10	19	18					12	11	WD	WD			7
6	(Italy) RP Motorsport			14	14					7	9	9	16	6	7							0
6	(Italy) RP Motorsport			Ret	Ret					13	12	13	DNS	Ret	14							0
7	(Spain) Drivex School			13	18	11	Ret	13	12	15	14	14	15	Ret	12	11	12	13	15	14	9	0
7	(Spain) Drivex School			15	19					17	15											0
8	(United Kingdom) CF Racing									16	16					13	13					0
8	(United Kingdom) CF Racing									18	Ret											0
9	(Greece) Tsimpris Motorsport			16	17																	0
Non-championship round-only teams
	(Spain) Campos Racing	4	1																			0
	(Spain) Campos Racing	8	9																			0
Pos	Driver	NC		R1	R2	R1	R2	R1	R2	R1	R2	R1	R2	R1	R2	R1	R2	R1	R2	R1	R2	Pts
Pos	Driver	LEC1 (France)		LEC2 (France)		PAU (France)		HOC (Germany)		SPA (Belgium)		HUN (Hungary)		RBR (Austria)		SIL (United Kingdom)		CAT (Spain)		MNZ (Italy)		Pts
