= Jack Doohan =

Australian racing driver (born 2003)

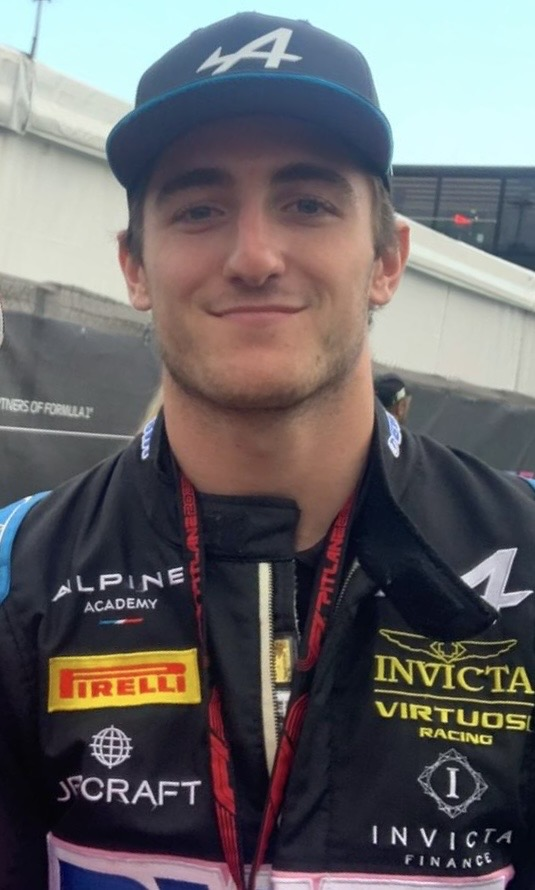
- Doohan at the 2023 Barcelona Formula 2 round
- Born: Jack Michael Doohan; 20 January 2003 (age 23); Gold Coast, Queensland, Australia
- Parent: Mick Doohan (father)

Asian Le Mans Series career
- Debut season: 2026–27
- Current team: AF Corse
- Categorisation: FIA Platinum
- Car number: 55
- Starts: 2
- Wins: 0
- Podiums: 0
- Poles: 0
- Fastest laps: 0
- Best finish: TBD in 2026–27 (LMP2)

Formula One World Championship career
- Nationality: (Australia) Australian
- Active years: 2024–2025
- Team: Alpine
- Car number: 7 (Note: Doohan selected the number 7 as his personal driver number, per FIA regulations; in 2024, he competed using the standard reserve number 61 for Alpine.)
- Entries: 7 (7 starts)
- Championships: 0
- Wins: 0
- Podiums: 0
- Career points: 0
- Pole positions: 0
- Fastest laps: 0
- First entry: 2024 Abu Dhabi Grand Prix
- Last entry: 2025 Miami Grand Prix
- 2025 position: 21st (0 pts)

Previous series
- 2021–2023; 2020–2021; 2019–2020; 2019; 2018–2019; 2018; 2018; 2018: FIA Formula 2; FIA Formula 3; F3 Asian; Euroformula Open; MRF Challenge; Italian F4; ADAC F4; F4 British

Jack Michael Doohan (/ˈduːən/ DOO-ən; born 20 January 2003) is an Australian racing driver who competes in the LMP2 class of the Asian Le Mans Series for AF Corse. He previously competed in the European Le Mans Series for Nielsen Racing. Doohan also serves as a reserve driver in Formula One for Haas. He competed in Formula One at seven Grands Prix from 2024 to 2025.

Born and raised in the city of Gold Coast, Queensland, Doohan is the son of five-time Grand Prix motorcycle World Champion Mick Doohan. He began kart racing aged nine in a go-kart given to him by Michael Schumacher, winning multiple national titles. Graduating to junior formulae in 2018, Doohan started his career in the F4 British Championship. After finishing runner-up to Joey Alders in the 2019–20 F3 Asian Championship, Doohan moved to FIA Formula 3 in 2020, where he finished runner-up to Dennis Hauger the following season with Trident. Doohan then progressed to FIA Formula 2, achieving several wins in both his 2022 and 2023 campaigns with Virtuosi, and finishing third in the latter.

A member of the Alpine Academy since 2022—previously a member of the Red Bull Junior Team—Doohan served as a reserve driver for Alpine in 2023 and 2024, debuting in Formula One at the latter Abu Dhabi Grand Prix as a replacement for Esteban Ocon. He was promoted to a full-time seat in 2025, replacing Ocon to partner Pierre Gasly; he was replaced by Franco Colapinto after six rounds without points.

== Early life ==
Jack Michael Doohan was born on 20 January 2003 in the city of Gold Coast, Queensland, Australia. His father, Mick Doohan, is a former motorcycle road racer who won five consecutive 500cc World Riders' Championship titles from 1994 to 1998. His mother, Selina Doohan (née Sines), helped raise him in the Gold Coast alongside his older sister Allexis. Doohan attended the Southport School throughout his childhood.

== Junior racing career ==
=== Karting (2012–2017) ===
Doohan started karting competitively in 2012. He was given his first kart from former neighbor and seven-time Formula One champion Michael Schumacher. He won the Australian Karting Championship in 2015 and 2016. Doohan had additional success the next year, finishing third in the CIK-FIA Karting European Championship and sixth in the World Championship.

=== Formula 4 (2018) ===
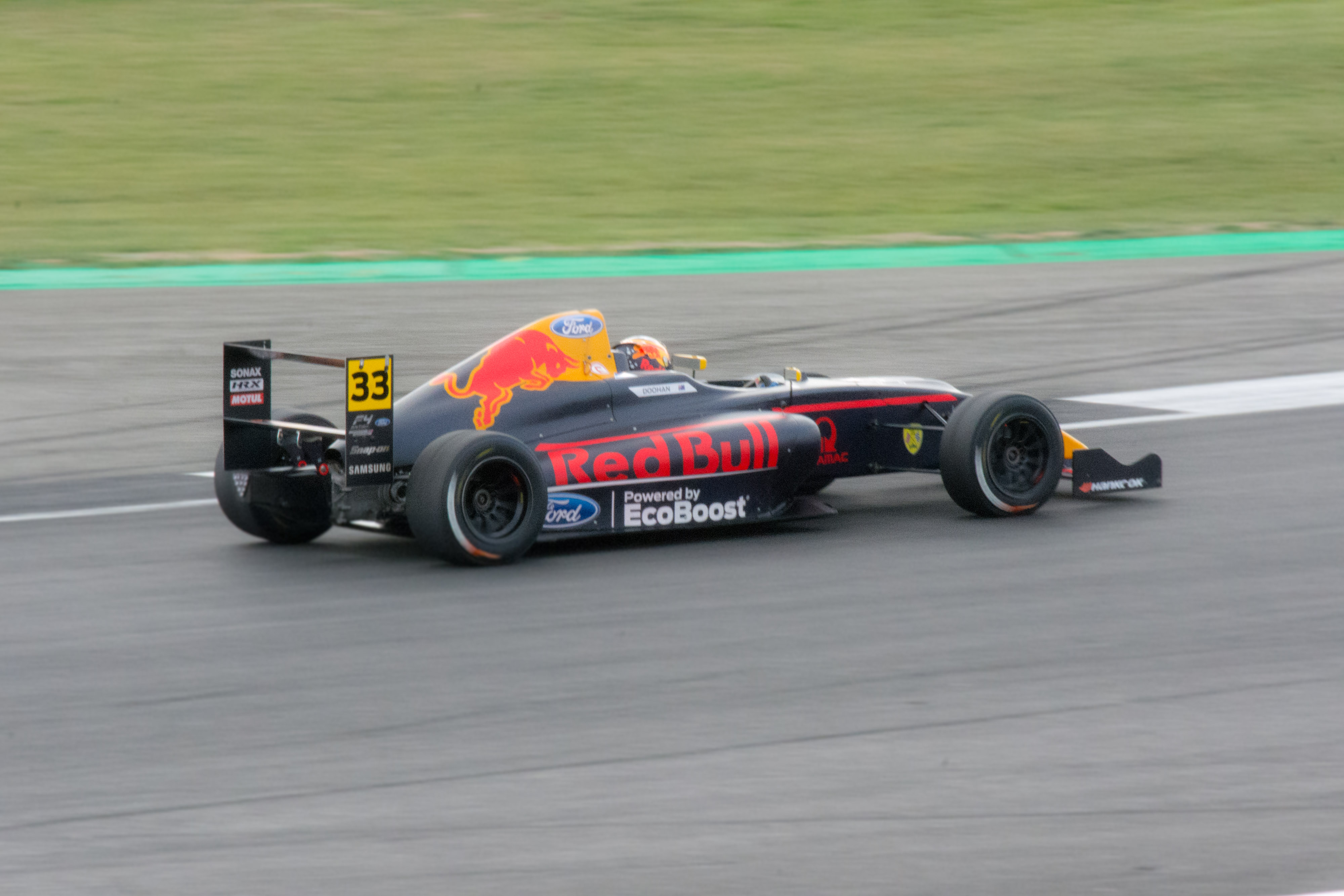
Doohan at the 2018 F4 British Championship

Doohan started his single-seater career at the age of fifteen in the F4 British Championship with the TRS Arden Junior Racing Team, alongside fellow Red Bull junior Dennis Hauger. He scored three wins throughout the season, with his first car racing victory coming at Thruxton. Doohan finished fifth in the standings, just one point behind Hauger.

That year, Doohan also participated in both the German and Italian Formula 4 championships for Prema Powerteam on a part-time basis. He finished 12th and 20th in the standings respectively, scoring no podiums.

=== Formula Three (2019–2021) ===
==== 2019: Debut in Asian Championship and Euroformula ====
In 2019, Doohan made his first appearance in the F3 Asian Championship with Hitech Grand Prix. Driving for Hitech Grand Prix, the Aussie won five races and ended up second in the championship, 25 points adrift of the experienced Ukyo Sasahara. Doohan's main campaign in 2019 would lie in the Euroformula Open with Double R. The Australian finished on the podium twice, once at Hockenheimring and at the Red Bull Ring. Other than that, his season was average and Doohan ended 11th in the standings, and sixth in the rookies'. The next winter, Doohan returned to the Asian Championship with Pinnacle Motorsport. He once again finished in the runner-up spot, this time behind Joey Alders.

==== 2020: Debut campaign in FIA Formula 3 ====
In 2020, Doohan progressed to the FIA Formula 3 Championship, driving for HWA Racelab, partnering Jake Hughes and FDA-member Enzo Fittipaldi. Doohan's high point during the season was seventh in qualifying in Silverstone and topping practice in Spa-Francorchamps, but mainly his campaign was full of incidents and misfortune. Doohan did not score any points during the campaign, and with a best finish of eleventh place, which came at the final race in Mugello, he classified 26th in the drivers' championship. Despite describing the year as having been "very very tough", Doohan maintained that he had been able to learn more from it than he would have from a more successful season. He tested for Trident during post-season testing.

==== 2021: Runner-up to Hauger ====
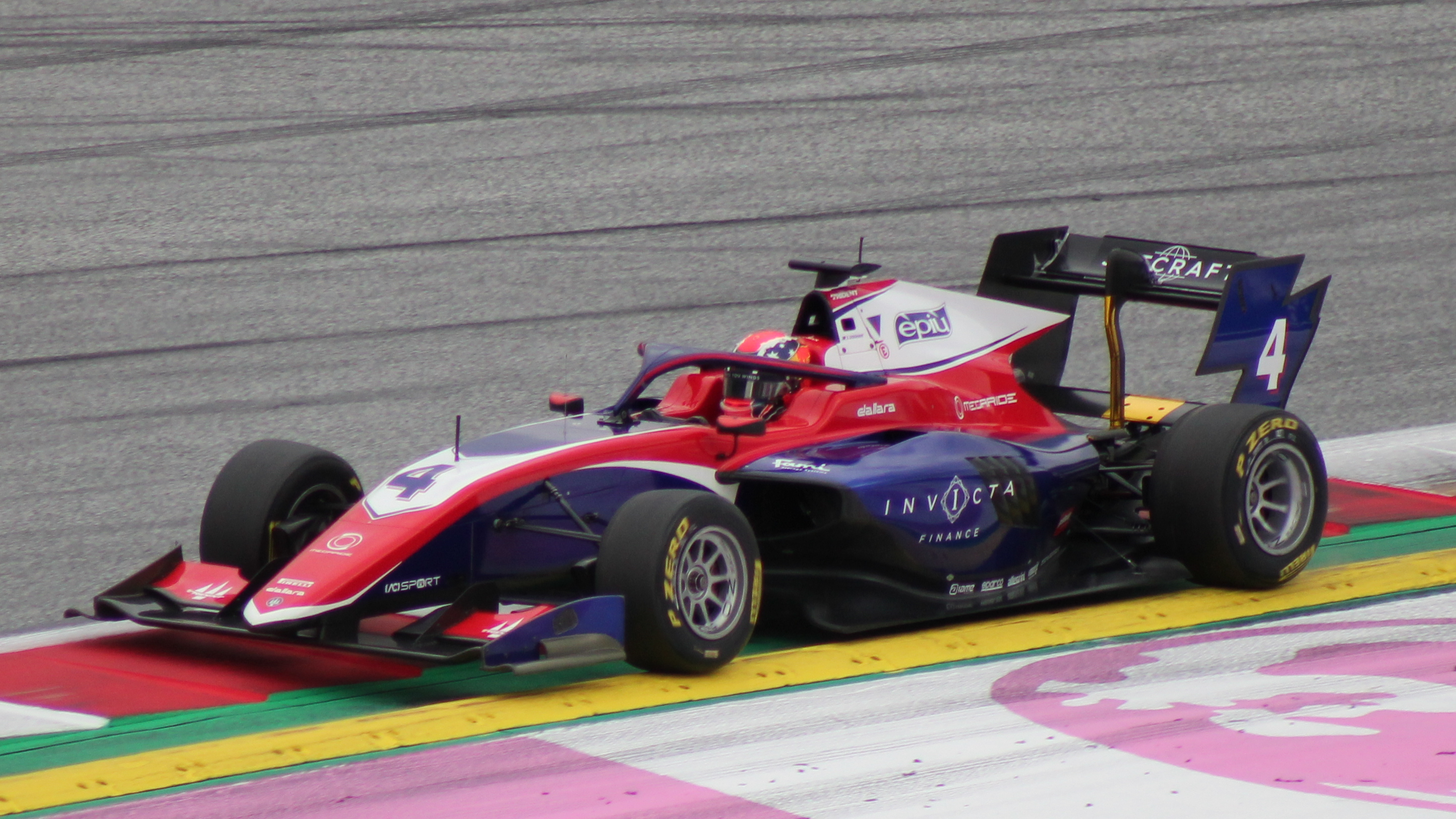
Doohan driving the Dallara F3 2019 during the 2021 Spielberg Formula 3 round.

For the 2021 season, Doohan made the switch to Trident to partner Clément Novalak and David Schumacher. He started his season off strong with a second place in qualifying in Barcelona. He scored his first points with eighth in the second sprint race, and despite a slow start in the feature race, Doohan was able to take second and his first podium. Doohan qualified fourth in France, and drove solid races in the sprint races for eighth and fifth places. He would secure his first F3 victory after overtaking Dennis Hauger with a few laps to go. At the Red Bull Ring, Doohan qualified in seventh and finished in the same position in sprint race 1, but was promoted to third place due to numerous penalties from others ahead of him. He would finish seventh in the second sprint but was hit by Jak Crawford in the feature race, which caused a puncture that unravelled his race. In Budapest, Doohan qualified third. He had an average first sprint race, finishing ninth but fell back to 13th in the second sprint due to mechanical issues. He bettered that result and took third place in the feature race.

The following weekend in Spa-Francorchamps was where he achieved his biggest success of the campaign. Doohan took his first pole position on Friday by 0.7 seconds. Doohan ended 12th in the first sprint race, in which he revealed he purposely kept his spot to block off Dennis Hauger behind for reverse pole. Doohan would then control things perfectly and win both the second sprint race and the feature race at Spa-Francorchamps, even having a battle with Victor Martins in the latter race. This made him the first FIA Formula 3 driver to score two victories on the same weekend. He qualified fourth in Zandvoort and ended sixth in the first race. However, a mistake in the second race at Zandvoort cost him a heap of points, but he managed to finish fourth in the feature race. Doohan claimed pole in the final round in Sochi. A mistake by Doohan in the sprint race left him out of the points and Hauger to claim the title. Having defied team orders to let through his teammate Novalak during the race, Doohan won the last race, making sure that Trident were able to win the teams' championship by a measly four points.

Doohan remained in Formula 3 for post-season with newcomers Van Amersfoort Racing.

=== FIA Formula 2 (2021–2023) ===
==== 2021: Debut with MP ====
Doohan joined MP Motorsport for the final two rounds of the 2021 championship, replacing Richard Verschoor. He qualified 16th on his debut in Jeddah, and in the first sprint race, narrowly missed reverse pole by 0.08 seconds. In just his second race, Doohan avoided all chaos for his first points in fifth place. Doohan qualified a brilliant second in the Yas Marina finale. He once again scored points in the second sprint race, finishing eighth. His feature race ended in disappointment, as he spun into the barrier on the opening lap, ending his race. Doohan ended his partial F2 campaign 19th place in the standings with eight points.

==== 2022: Maiden victories ====
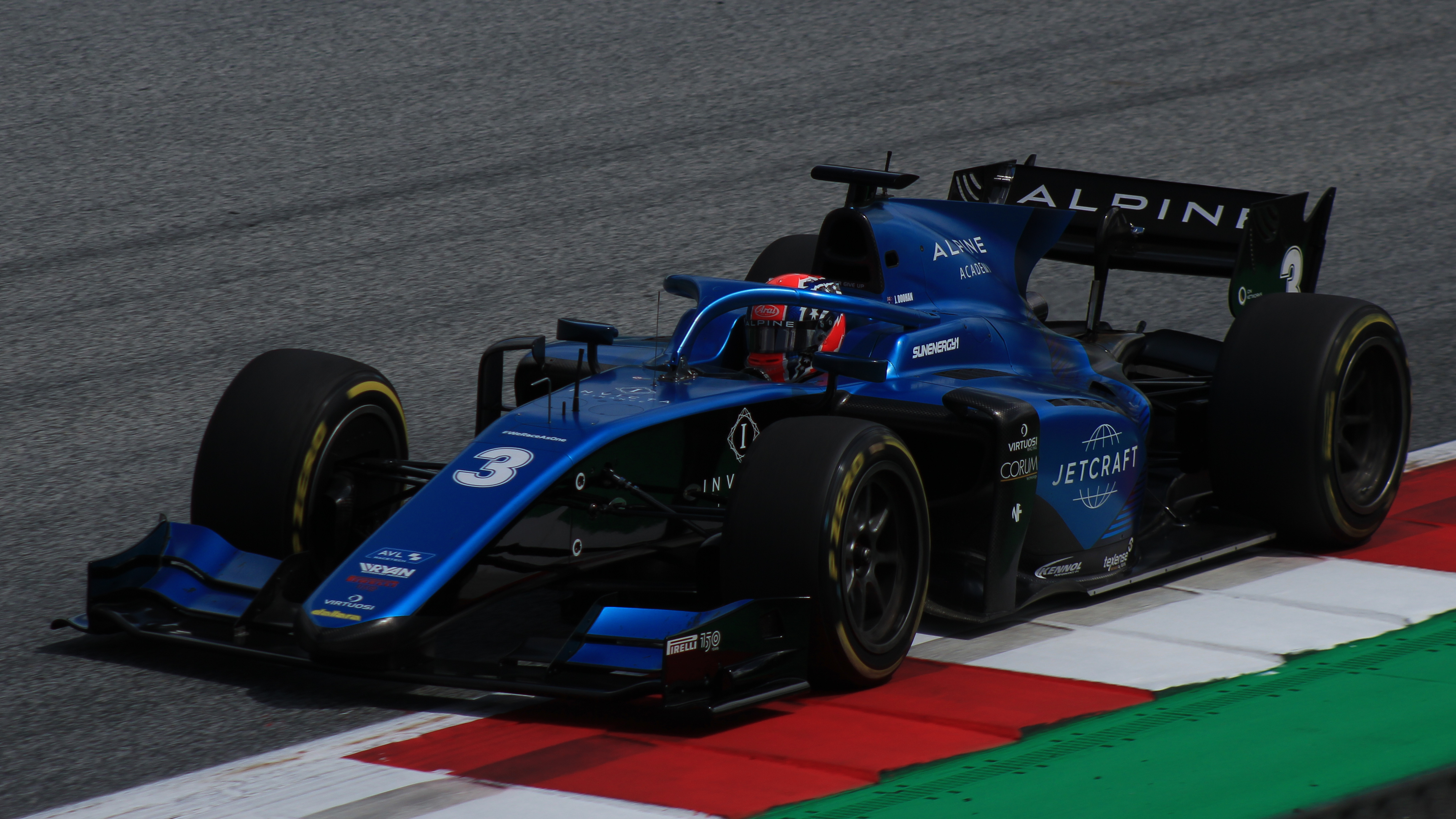
Doohan driving the Dallara F2 2018 during the 2022 Spielberg Formula 2 round.

On 13 December 2021, it was announced that Doohan would join Virtuosi Racing alongside Marino Sato for the 2022 championship. His start to the season looked promising, as he would score pole position in the season opener at Bahrain. Doohan lacked pace in the sprint race and ended where he started. However, a collision with Théo Pourchaire at the pit exit during the feature race broke his front wing, taking the Australian out of the battle for the lead. He fell down to last but managed to recover to tenth place. Nevertheless, Doohan found positives in his performance, stating that he "[had been] as quick as anyone" during the race. Doohan qualified third in Jeddah, but unfortunately was disqualified from qualifying due to a technical infringement. He was involved in a race-ending collision with Logan Sargeant in the sprint race, where Doohan hit the back of Sargeant during a safety car restart, receiving a grid drop. He made another feature race recovery, finishing ninth.

Another disastrous round followed at Imola, where he qualified third for the feature race. After 11th in the sprint race, he would clash with Dennis Hauger at the start of the feature race, putting him out of the running. Nevertheless, the Australian soldiered on, taking another pole position in the fourth round in Barcelona. Setting his target towards "[getting] some points on the board" for the feature race, Doohan placed sixth in the sprint race after a good start. He would score his first podium of the season on Sunday, ending up second after being overtaken by championship leader Felipe Drugovich in the latter half of the race. Doohan qualified fifth in Monaco, but was promoted to third following penalties. Following finishing seventh in the sprint race, Doohan missed a second podium after he was jumped by Jüri Vips in the pit stops, settling for fourth place. His top 3 qualifying streak ended in Baku, securing only 11th. He had another weekend to forget, his sprint race was affected due to a collision, and a penalty for him in the feature race due to contact with Liam Lawson demoted Doohan to P13.

Doohan qualified seventh for the feature race in Silverstone. In the sprint race, Doohan would take his first victory of the season, fighting his way up to first in the sprint race in wet conditions. Starting on the alternate strategy for the feature race, Doohan continued to score points with ninth. He continued this form by scoring another podium at the Red Bull Ring. However, the podium would be a distant memory in the feature race as like many others, started on the wets on a drying track. This would be the wrong call and Doohan collected multiple penalties on the way to 19th place. Doohan qualified fourth for the Paul Ricard round and ended a hectic sprint race in the same position. He stormed into the lead during the feature race start, but was re-passed by Ayumu Iwasa in the next few corners. Following the pit stops, Doohan would spin trying to pass Pourchaire, and fell to fifth at the flag. In Budapest, the Australian would win once again, dominating the sprint race on Saturday from reverse pole. However, he had a gearbox failure on the opening lap of the feature race and was forced to retire.

After the summer break, Doohan experienced an exceptional round at Spa-Francorchamps, firstly qualifying fourth. He finished second in the sprint race after a good start, even passing Ralph Boschung on the last lap. After jumping to second in the start, Doohan would eventually undercut race leader Felipe Drugovich during the pit stops and claim his first F2 feature race victory. Doohan qualified in second the next week at Zandvoort. and finished outside the points in ninth during the sprint. However, a collision with Richard Verschoor on a safety car restart left him unable to finish. He scored his third pole of the year at Monza. He ended sixth in the sprint race but he had another forgetful feature race, a bad start costing him and a subsequent collision with Jehan Daruvala brought about a premature end to his race once more. Doohan's horrid luck continued into the final round of the year at Yas Marina, where a loose wheel forced him to retire in the feature race, having finished seventh in the sprint race. He ended up sixth in the drivers' standings with 128 points, three wins, three poles, four fastest laps and six total podiums.

==== 2023: Third in championship ====
Doohan partook in the 2022 post-season test, remaining with Virtuosi. Soon after, he was confirmed to continuing his relationship with the British outfit for the 2023 campaign, alongside Amaury Cordeel.

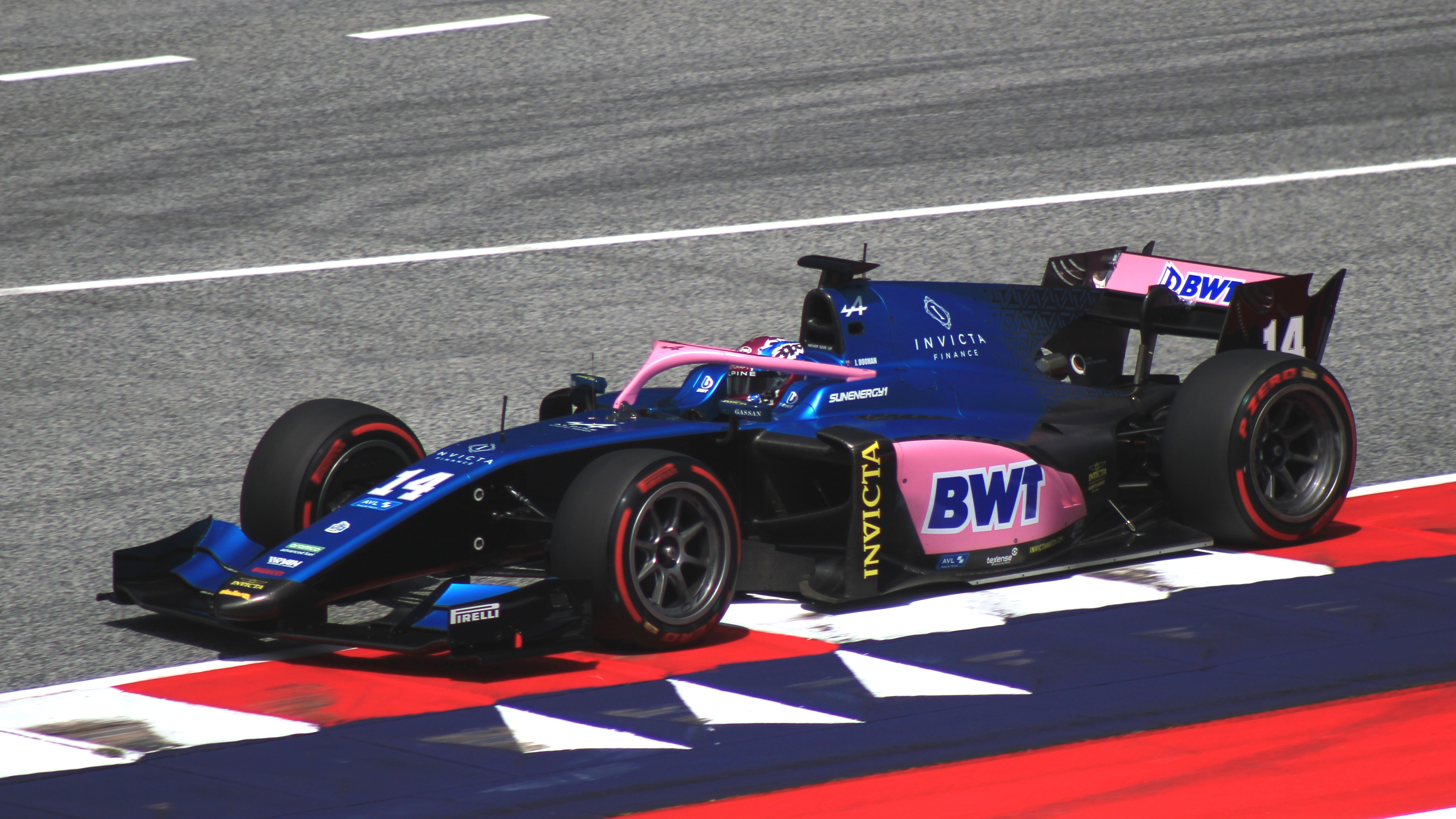
Doohan driving for Invicta Virtuosi Racing during the 2023 Spielberg Formula 2 round.

Doohan had a terrible opening round in Bahrain, a poor qualifying in 17th would not reward him with any points. The Australian was back on form in Jeddah, qualifying fourth and securing his first points of the season with seventh in the sprint race. In the feature race, Doohan made the most of mistakes from the leaders, and secured a second placed podium. In his Australia home race, a late red flag saw Doohan down in 15th for qualifying, having topped practice. He had a disappointing sprint race after being spun out by Juan Manuel Correa, but achieved eighth place in the feature race although more points was inevitable without an early safety car. The Australian had another disheartening weekend in Baku, an incident in the sprint and 16th in the feature race summarised another point-less weekend.

In Monaco, Doohan qualified in fourth and his sprint race was rather uneventful, ending in sixth place. In the feature race, he was running in fourth and set for a big haul of points until he crashed mid-race at Massenet corner. Barcelona saw Doohan back in the top-three for qualifying. He would claim fifth place in the sprint race, but fell back in the feature race for sixth place. In Austria, Doohan qualified in fifth. A trip through the gravel ruined his chances of a good result, though he would fight back to seventh place. In the feature race, Doohan improved his place during the start to third, later passing Théo Pourchaire and was set for second place until a late safety car, where alternate strategy runners Richard Verschoor and Ayumu Iwasa passed him, dropping to fourth place. In Silverstone, Doohan secured fourth in qualifying. During the sprint race, he charged up the order whilst having a tense battle with Oliver Bearman. The Australian won out the fight, claiming third and his first podium since the second round. He had a solid feature race, finishing fourth during a hectic race.

In Hungary, Doohan made his mark by securing his first pole of the year. During the feature race, Doohan would go on to dominate the race, taking his maiden win of the season by nine seconds. In Spa-Francorchamps, Doohan would continue his form by topping practice, but qualified in a disappointing 11th. Doohan improved to fifth in the sprint race During the feature race, Doohan ran the alternate strategy and luck would go his way when the safety car was deployed late on. He pitted and emerged in second place, in which he overcame leader Pourchaire on the second last lap for consecutive feature race victories.

Aiming to continue his stunning run of form, he qualified fifth in Zandvoort. However, he failed to score any points, even failing to complete a lap in the feature race after spinning on a damp track. A messy qualifying in Monza saw Doohan only 14th, and numerous safety cars in the feature race limited him to only sixth place, knocking himself out of title contention. Doohan took pole position for the final race in Yas Marina. During the sprint race he gained four places to finish sixth. In the feature race he had a good start from pole position leading until he pitted on lap 10 for the medium tyres. He then controlled the race and won by 3.8 seconds which allowed him to jump Ayumu Iwasa for third place in the standings, securing three wins, five podiums, two pole positions and two fastest laps. Doohan exited Formula 2 at the end of 2023 in a bid to join Formula One for the 2025 season after spending two seasons in the former category.

At the Formula 2 end of season awards night, Doohan received the inaugural Formula 2 Best Performance Award, an award he shared with Richard Verschoor.

== Formula One career ==
In September 2017, Doohan was signed to the Red Bull Junior Team. He left the academy following his 2021 season and signed to the Alpine Academy in 2022. Doohan described his switch as being a "no-brainer", stating that the F1 testing programme and the team's project within the World Endurance Championship gave him myriad opportunities for the future. He would get his first chance to test the Alpine A521 at the Losail International Circuit in May of that year. He then drove the car again at the Monza Circuit prior to the British Grand Prix weekend. In September, Doohan tested with the Alpine A521 at the Hungaroring, alongside Antonio Giovinazzi and Nyck de Vries. Doohan participated in his first free practice sessions (FP1) with Alpine at the Mexico City Grand Prix and Abu Dhabi Grand Prix. He was even in discussions of a 2023 Formula One seat with the French outfit, but it was handed to Pierre Gasly. Doohan also took part in the post-season tests with the Alpine.

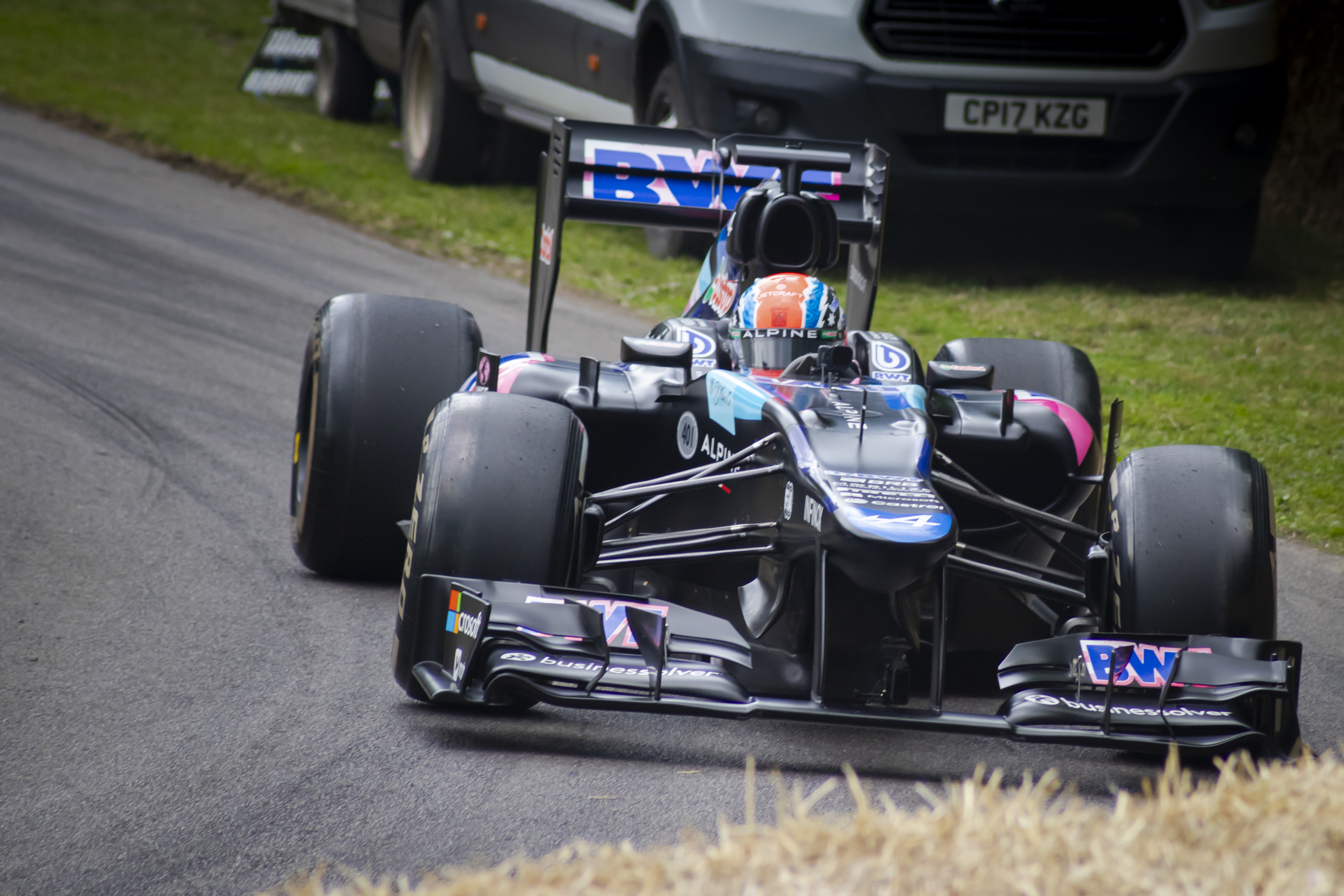
Doohan giving a demonstration of a Lotus E20 at the 2024 Goodwood Festival of Speed

In 2023, Doohan was announced as the reserve driver for Alpine. Doohan partook in his first F1 test of the year in May, driving the A521 at Monza. Doohan again participated in the first free practice with Alpine at the Mexico City Grand Prix. He completed 25 laps and ranked 18th overall. He drove again in Free Practice 1 for the Abu Dhabi Grand Prix with Alpine, setting the thirteenth-fastest time as the fourth-ranked rookie. He then took part in the young drivers' test once again with Alpine, setting the seventh fastest time.

Doohan focused his 2024 campaign on being the reserve driver for Alpine, where he revealed his goal to join the Formula One grid for the 2025 season. In May 2024, Doohan completed his first test of the year with the Alpine A522 at Zandvoort. He partook in the first free practice session for Alpine at the Canadian Grand Prix, as well as the British Grand Prix. Doohan again drove the A522 at Circuit Paul Ricard as he was marked as one of the contenders for a seat with Alpine for 2025 in place of the departing Esteban Ocon.

=== Alpine (2024–2025) ===
==== 2024: Early debut in Abu Dhabi ====
In August 2024, Alpine announced Doohan would compete in 2025 to replace Esteban Ocon. He is the first Alpine Academy driver to be promoted to Formula One. (Note: The Alpine Academy was re-established in 2021, making Doohan the first driver to be promoted under this banner, but it previously existed as the Renault Sport Academy. Oscar Piastri became the first former member to graduate to Formula One in 2023, but had left the academy following a contract dispute.) Doohan made an early debut for Alpine at the 2024 Abu Dhabi Grand Prix, replacing Ocon after the latter departed the team early. He qualified twentieth on debut, before finishing fifteenth in the race. He then took part in the Yas Marina post-season test, completing 137 laps and setting the eighth-fastest time overall.

==== 2025: Rookie season and demotion ====
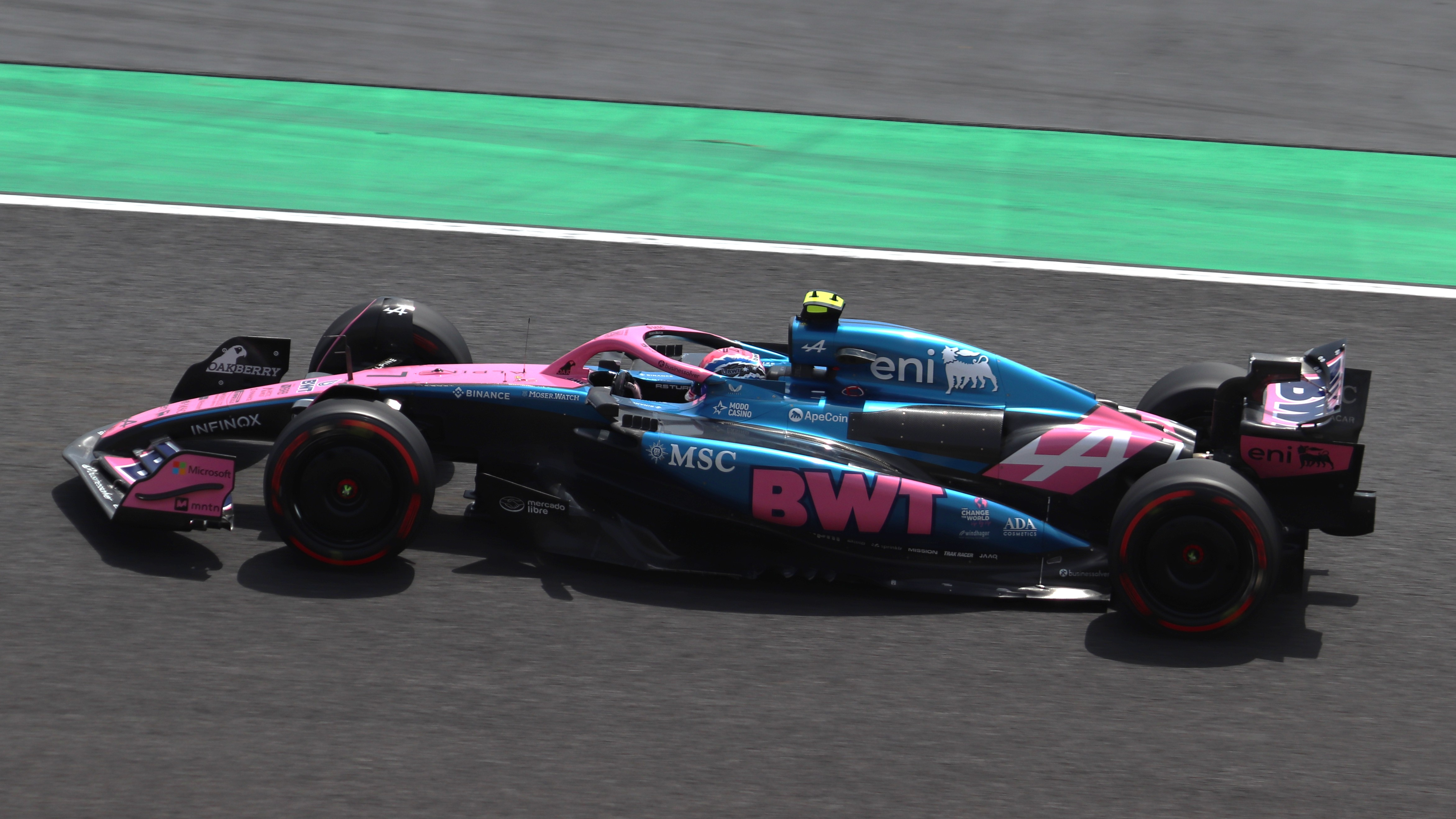
Doohan (pictured at the Japanese Grand Prix) made his full-time debut with Alpine in 2025; he was replaced after six rounds.

Doohan partnered Pierre Gasly for 2025, his debut full-time campaign in Formula One. Amidst rumours he could be replaced by their newly-recruited reserve driver, Franco Colapinto, early into the season—Alpine team adviser Flavio Briatore, also his manager, stated "if there's a driver who isn't bringing me results, [I will] change him" and Doohan commented "you're always going to have pressure on your shoulders [in] such a cut-throat sport". He qualified fourteenth at the season-opening Australian Grand Prix, before crashing on the opening lap in wet conditions. He received ten-second time penalties in both the sprint and main races in China as he finished twentieth and thirteenth, respectively; he caused a collision with Gabriel Bortoleto at the former and forced Isack Hadjar off-track at the latter.

In the second free practice session at the Japanese Grand Prix, Doohan failed to close his drag reduction system into the flat-out First Turn, causing him to spin into the barriers at 160 mph (260 km/h); he qualified nineteenth and finished fifteenth. He improved to qualify eleventh, run in the points for the first half of the race and finish fourteenth after the team kept him out with worn hards during the safety car in Bahrain, receiving a five-second time penalty for exceeding track limits. He claimed seventeenth in both qualifying and the race in Saudi Arabia after a failed strategic gamble under safety car conditions. After finishing sixteenth in the Miami Grand Prix sprint, he qualified fourteenth for the main race, prior to retiring in a first-lap collision with Liam Lawson. Alpine opened discussions to replace him with Colapinto after his early-season performances; a few days later, Doohan was demoted to a reserve role. Briatore justified the change as a "fair assessment" of the drivers in preparation for the 2026 season, and commented that Doohan's stint at the team was "very difficult". The change was initially described as a "rotating seat" arrangement, with Colapinto scheduled to contest the next five Grands Prix, however he retained the seat after those five races.

At the start of 2026, it was announced that Doohan had parted ways with Alpine with immediate effect.

=== Haas reserve driver (2026) ===
For 2026, Doohan joined Haas as a reserve driver.

== Sportscar racing career ==
=== European Le Mans Series ===
==== 2026 ====
Alongside his reserve driver duties with Haas in Formula One, Doohan signed with Nielsen Racing to compete in the LMP2 class of the 2026 European Le Mans Series. Edward Pearson and Roy Nissany joined Doohan as his teammates for the season. In qualifying at Barcelona, Doohan put the car in the bottom half of the class in seventh. During the race teammates Pearson and Nissany moved up to sixth in class during their stints. Doohan was the final driver of the three to drive the car. He was competitive from the start of his stint, and worked his way up the field to third. With less than 15 minutes to go in the race, Doohan closed up to second place Ben Hanley in the No. 22 United Autosports car with the No. 29 Forrestier Panis car of Esteban Masson close behind in fourth. Hanley went wide on the exit of turn 11 which allowed Doohan to go alongside Hanley into turn 12. The two then made contact as Hanley went wide and hit Doohan's right rear tire. Doohan later had a rear right suspension failure with less than a minute remaining, dropping him from third to seventh.

== Super Formula ==
=== 2026 ===
After being dropped by Alpine, Doohan took part in the Super Formula pre-season test at Suzuka, driving for Kondo Racing. However, he crashed three times at Degner 2, limiting his running. Negotiations between Doohan and Kondo Racing ended after disagreements between the two parties arose on how to make the #4 Kondo Racing car competitive. The No. 4 Kondo entry had mediocre results in the previous three seasons, and F1 junior drivers tend to bring engineers from Europe to the Japanese championship, which Doohan seemed to be leaning towards. Despite rumours that Doohan was expected to bring in funding to secure the second Kondo seat, it was not a deciding factor in the negotiations.

== Karting record ==
=== Karting career summary ===
Season	Series	Team	Position
2012	SKUSA SuperNationals — TaG Cadet		38th
2013	SKUSA Pro Tour — TaG Cadet		16th
2013	SKUSA SuperNationals — TaG Cadet	Pserra Racing	4th
2013	Florida Winter Tour — Rotax Micro Max		7th
2014	SKUSA Pro Tour — TaG Cadet		20th
2015	Australian Kart Championship — KA Junior		**1st**
2016	Australian Kart Championship — KA2		**1st**
2016	WSK Super Master Series — OKJ	Tony Kart Racing Team	NC†
2016	CIK-FIA European Championship — OKJ	Tony Kart Racing Team	NC†
2016	ROK Cup International Final — Junior ROK		13th
2016	IAME International Final — X30 Junior		NC
2016	CIK-FIA World Championship — OKJ	Ricky Flynn Motorsport	23rd
2017	WSK Champions Cup — OKJ	Ricky Flynn Motorsport	33rd
2017	South Garda Winter Cup — OKJ	Ricky Flynn Motorsport	8th
2017	WSK Super Master Series — OKJ	Ricky Flynn Motorsport	6th
2017	CIK-FIA European Championship — OKJ	Ricky Flynn Motorsport	**3rd**
2017	CIK-FIA World Championship — OKJ	Ricky Flynn Motorsport	6th
2017	WSK Final Cup — OK	Ricky Flynn Motorsport	10th
2017	Australian Kart Championship — KA2		12th

^{†} As Doohan was a guest driver, he was ineligible for points.

=== Complete CIK-FIA Karting European Championship results ===
(key) (Races in bold indicate pole position) (Races in italics indicate fastest lap)

Year	Team	Class	1	2	3	4	5	6	7	8	9	10	11	12	DC	Points
2016	Tony Kart Racing Team	OKJ	ZUE; QH	ZUE; PF	ZUE; R	ADR; QH	ADR; PF	ADR; R	PRT; QH; 58	PRT; PF; 19	PRT; R DNQ	GEN; QH	GEN; PF	GEN; R	NC	0
2017	Ricky Flynn Motorsport	OKJ	SAR; QH; 26	SAR; R 14	CAY; QH; 27	CAY; R 17	LEM; QH; 12	LEM; R 5	ALA; QH; 1	**ALA**; **R** 4	KRI; QH; 1	**KRI**; **R** 1			3rd	71

== Racing record ==
=== Racing career summary ===
Season	Series	Team	Races	Wins	Poles	F/laps	Podiums	Points	Position
2018	F4 British Championship	TRS Arden Junior Racing Team	30	3	0	7	12	328	5th
2018	ADAC Formula 4 Championship	Prema Theodore Racing	8	0	0	1	0	35	12th
2018	Italian F4 Championship	Prema Theodore Racing	6	0	0	0	0	9	20th
2018–19	MRF Challenge Formula 2000	MRF Racing	5	0	0	0	2	50	9th
2019	Euroformula Open Championship	Double R Racing	16	0	0	0	2	79	11th
2019	F3 Asian Championship	Hitech Grand Prix	15	5	1	5	13	276	**2nd**
2019	F3 Asian Winter Series	Hitech Grand Prix	3	0	0	0	2	0	NC†
2019–20	F3 Asian Championship	Pinnacle Motorsport	15	5	4	5	10	229	**2nd**
2020	FIA Formula 3 Championship	HWA Racelab	18	0	0	0	0	0	26th
2021	FIA Formula 3 Championship	Trident	20	4	2	1	7	179	**2nd**
2021	FIA Formula 2 Championship	MP Motorsport	6	0	0	0	0	7	19th
2022	FIA Formula 2 Championship	Virtuosi Racing	28	3	3	4	6	128	6th
2023	FIA Formula 2 Championship	Invicta Virtuosi Racing	25	3	2	3	5	168	**3rd**
2023	Formula One	BWT Alpine F1 Team	Reserve driver						
2024	Formula One	BWT Alpine F1 Team	1	0	0	0	0	0	24th
2025	Formula One	BWT Alpine F1 Team	6	0	0	0	0	0	21st
2026	European Le Mans Series – LMP2	Nielsen Racing	4	0	0	0	0	21	14th
2026	24 Hours of Le Mans - LMP2	Nielsen Racing	1	0	0	0	0	N/A	18th
2026	Formula One	TGR Haas F1 Team	Reserve driver						
2026–27	Asian Le Mans Series – LMP2	AF Corse	2	0	0	0	0	8*	9th*

^{†} As Doohan was a guest driver, he was ineligible for points. * Season still in progress.

=== Complete F4 British Championship results ===
(key) (Races in bold indicate pole position) (Races in italics indicate fastest lap)

Year	Team	1	2	3	4	5	6	7	8	9	10	11	12	13	14	15	16	17	18	19	20	21	22	23	24	25	26	27	28	29	30	Pos	Points
2018	TRS Arden Junior Racing Team	BRI; 1; 9	BRI; 2; 3	BRI; 3; 7	DON; 1; 3	DON; 2; 4	DON; 3; 4	THR; 1; 4	THR; 2; 9	THR; 3; 1	OUL; 1; 5	OUL; 2; 2	OUL; 3; 6	CRO; 1 Ret	CRO; 2; 4	CRO; 3; 3	SNE; 1; 4	SNE; 2; 11	SNE; 3; 1	ROC; 1; 2	ROC; 2; 3	ROC; 3 Ret	KNO; 1; 3	KNO; 2; 9	KNO; 3; 6	SIL; 1; 3	SIL; 2; 1	SIL; 3; 3	BHGP; 1; 8	BHGP; 2; 8	BHGP; 3; 7	5th	328

=== Complete ADAC Formula 4 Championship results ===
(key) (Races in bold indicate pole position) (Races in italics indicate fastest lap)

Year	Team	1	2	3	4	5	6	7	8	9	10	11	12	13	14	15	16	17	18	19	20	Pos	Points
2018	Prema Theodore Racing	OSC; 1	OSC; 2	OSC; 3	HOC1; 1; 8	HOC1; 2; 6	HOC1; 3; 5	LAU; 1	LAU; 2	LAU; 3	RBR; 1	RBR; 2	RBR; 3	HOC2; 1; 12	HOC2; 2; 4	NÜR; 1 Ret	NÜR; 2 Ret	NÜR; 3; 12	HOC3; 1	HOC3; 2	HOC3; 3	12th	35

=== Complete Italian F4 Championship results ===
(key) (Races in bold indicate pole position) (Races in italics indicate fastest lap)

Year	Team	1	2	3	4	5	6	7	8	9	10	11	12	13	14	15	16	17	18	19	20	21	Pos	Points
2018	Prema Theodore Racing	ADR; 1	ADR; 2	ADR; 3	LEC; 1 Ret	LEC; 2; 10	LEC; 3; 12	MNZ; 1; 6	MNZ; 2; 11	MNZ; 3; 19	MIS; 1	MIS; 2	MIS; 3	IMO; 1	IMO; 2	IMO; 3	VLL; 1	VLL; 2	VLL; 3	MUG; 1	MUG; 2	MUG; 3	20th	9

=== Complete MRF Challenge Formula 2000 Championship results ===
(key) (Races in bold indicate pole position; races in italics indicate points for the fastest lap of the race finishers)

Year	Team	1	2	3	4	5	6	7	8	9	10	11	12	13	14	15	DC	Points
2018–19	MRF Racing	DUB; 1	DUB; 2	DUB; 3	DUB; 4	DUB; 5	BHR; 1	BHR; 2	BHR; 3	BHR; 4	BHR; 5	CHE; 1; 3	CHE; 2; 9	CHE; 3; 6	CHE; 4; 3	CHE; 5; 5	9th	50

=== Complete F3 Asian Championship results ===
(key) (Races in bold indicate pole position) (Races in italics indicate fastest lap)

Year	Team	1	2	3	4	5	6	7	8	9	10	11	12	13	14	15	DC	Points
2019	Hitech Grand Prix	SEP; 1; 2	SEP; 2; 2	**SEP**; **3**; 1	CHA; 1; 2	CHA; 2; 1	CHA; 3; 2	SUZ; 1; 1	SUZ; 2; 10	SUZ; 3; 1	SIC1; 1; 4	SIC1; 2; 3	SIC1; 3; 2	SIC2; 1; 2	SIC2; 2; 3	SIC2; 3; 1	2nd	276
2019–20	Pinnacle Motorsport	SEP1; 1; 2	SEP1; 2; 8	**SEP1**; **3**; 1	DUB; 1; 1	DUB; 2; 3	DUB; 3; 11	ABU; 1; 3	ABU; 2 Ret	ABU; 3; 2	**SEP2**; **1**; 1	SEP2; 2; 1	**SEP2**; **3**; 1	**CHA**; **1**; 8	CHA; 2; 13†	CHA; 3; 2	2nd	229

=== Complete Euroformula Open Championship results ===
(key) (Races in bold indicate pole position) (Races in italics indicate fastest lap)

Year	Team	1	2	3	4	5	6	7	8	9	10	11	12	13	14	15	16	17	18	Pos	Points
2019	Double R Racing	LEC; 1; 9	LEC; 2; 9	PAU; 1; 12	PAU; 2 Ret	HOC; 1; 2	HOC; 2; 7	SPA; 1; 4	SPA; 2; 4	HUN; 1; 16	HUN; 2; 7	RBR; 1; 2	RBR; 2; 13	SIL; 1 WD	SIL; 2 WD	CAT; 1; 15	CAT; 2; 10	MNZ; 1; 10	MNZ; 2 Ret	11th	79

=== Complete FIA Formula 3 Championship results ===
(key) (Races in bold indicate pole position; races in italics indicate points for the fastest lap of top ten finishers)

Year	Entrant	1	2	3	4	5	6	7	8	9	10	11	12	13	14	15	16	17	18	19	20	21	DC	Points
2020	HWA Racelab	RBR; FEA; 14	RBR; SPR; Ret	RBR; FEA; 22	RBR; SPR; 20	HUN; FEA; Ret	HUN; SPR; 25	SIL; FEA; Ret	SIL; SPR; 27	SIL; FEA; 26	SIL; SPR; 21	CAT; FEA; 14	CAT; SPR; 15	SPA; FEA; 12	SPA; SPR; Ret	MNZ; FEA; 17	MNZ; SPR; 21	MUG; FEA; 13	MUG; SPR; 11				26th	0
2021	Trident	CAT; 1; 17	CAT; 2; 8	CAT; 3; 2	LEC; 1; 7	LEC; 2; 5	LEC; 3; 1	RBR; 1; 3	RBR; 2; 7	RBR; 3; 27	HUN; 1; 9	HUN; 2; 13	HUN; 3; 3	SPA; 1; 12	SPA; 2; 1	**SPA**; **3**; 1	ZAN; 1; 6	ZAN; 2; 18	ZAN; 3; 4	SOC; 1; 15	SOC; 2 C	**SOC**; **3**; 1	2nd	179

=== Complete FIA Formula 2 Championship results ===
(key) (Races in bold indicate pole position) (Races in italics indicate fastest lap)

Year	Entrant	1	2	3	4	5	6	7	8	9	10	11	12	13	14	15	16	17	18	19	20	21	22	23	24	25	26	27	28	DC	Points
2021	MP Motorsport	BHR; SP1	BHR; SP2	BHR; FEA	MCO; SP1	MCO; SP2	MCO; FEA	BAK; SP1	BAK; SP2	BAK; FEA	SIL; SP1	SIL; SP2	SIL; FEA	MNZ; SP1	MNZ; SP2	MNZ; FEA	SOC; SP1	SOC; SP2	SOC; FEA	JED; SP1; 11	JED; SP2; 5	JED; FEA; 13	YMC; SP1; 11	YMC; SP2; 8	YMC; FEA; Ret					19th	7
2022	Virtuosi Racing	BHR; SPR; 10	**BHR**; **FEA**; 10	JED; SPR; Ret	JED; FEA; 9	IMO; SPR; 11	IMO; FEA; Ret	CAT; SPR; 6	**CAT**; **FEA**; 2	MCO; SPR; 7	MCO; FEA; 4	BAK; SPR; 11	BAK; FEA; 13	SIL; SPR; 1	SIL; FEA; 9	RBR; SPR; 3	RBR; FEA; 19	LEC; SPR; 4	LEC; FEA; 5	HUN; SPR; 1	HUN; FEA; Ret	SPA; SPR; 2	SPA; FEA; 1	ZAN; SPR; 9	ZAN; FEA; Ret	MNZ; SPR; 6	**MNZ**; **FEA**; Ret	YMC; SPR; 7	YMC; FEA; Ret	6th	128
2023	Invicta Virtuosi Racing	BHR; SPR; 11	BHR; FEA; 16	JED; SPR; 7	JED; FEA; 2	MEL; SPR; Ret	MEL; FEA; 8	BAK; SPR; 17†	BAK; FEA; 15	MCO; SPR; 6	MCO; FEA; Ret	CAT; SPR; 5	CAT; FEA; 6	RBR; SPR; 7	RBR; FEA; 4	SIL; SPR; 3	SIL; FEA; 4	HUN; SPR; 10	**HUN**; **FEA**; 1	SPA; SPR; 5	SPA; FEA; 1	ZAN; SPR; 6	ZAN; FEA; DNS	MNZ; SPR; 9	MNZ; FEA; 6	YMC; SPR; 6	**YMC**; **FEA**; 1			3rd	168

=== Complete Formula One results ===
(key) (Races in bold indicate pole position) (Races in italics indicate fastest lap)

Year	Entrant	Chassis	Engine	1	2	3	4	5	6	7	8	9	10	11	12	13	14	15	16	17	18	19	20	21	22	23	24	WDC	Points
2022	BWT Alpine F1 Team	Alpine A522	Renault E-Tech RE22 1.6 V6 t	BHR	SAU	AUS	EMI	MIA	ESP	MON	AZE	CAN	GBR	AUT	FRA	HUN	BEL	NED	ITA	SIN	JPN	USA	MXC; TD	SAP	ABU; TD			–	–
2023	BWT Alpine F1 Team	Alpine A523	Renault E-Tech RE23 1.6 V6 t	BHR	SAU	AUS	AZE	MIA	MON	ESP	CAN	AUT	GBR	HUN	BEL	NED	ITA	SIN	JPN	QAT	USA	MXC; TD	SAP	LVG	ABU; TD			–	–
2024	BWT Alpine F1 Team	Alpine A524	Renault E-Tech RE24 1.6 V6 t	BHR	SAU	AUS	JPN	CHN	MIA	EMI	MON	CAN; TD	ESP	AUT	GBR; TD	HUN	BEL	NED	ITA	AZE	SIN	USA	MXC	SAP	LVG	QAT	ABU; 15	24th	0
2025	BWT Alpine F1 Team	Alpine A525	Renault E-Tech RE25 1.6 V6 t	AUS; Ret	CHN; 13	JPN; 15	BHR; 14	SAU; 17	MIA; Ret	EMI	MON	ESP	CAN	AUT	GBR	BEL	HUN	NED	ITA	AZE	SIN	USA	MXC	SAP	LVG	QAT	ABU	21st	0

=== Complete European Le Mans Series results ===
(key) (Races in bold indicate pole position; results in italics indicate fastest lap)

Year	Entrant	Class	Chassis	Engine	1	2	3	4	5	6	Rank	Points
2026	Nielsen Racing	LMP2	Oreca 07	Gibson GK428 4.2 L V8	CAT; 7	LEC; 10	IMO; 5	SPA; 8	SIL	ALG	14th	21

* Season still in progress.

=== Complete 24 Hours of Le Mans results ===
Year	Team	Co-Drivers	Car	Class	Laps	Pos.	Class Pos.
2026	(United Kingdom) Nielsen Racing	(Denmark) David Heinemeier Hansson (United Kingdom) Edward Pearson	Oreca 07-Gibson	LMP2	341	32nd	18th

=== Complete Asian Le Mans Series results ===
(key) (Races in bold indicate pole position; results in italics indicate fastest lap)

Year	Entrant	Class	Chassis	Engine	1	2	3	4	5	6	Rank	Points
2026–27	AF Corse	LMP2	Oreca 07	Gibson GK428 4.2 L V8	LEC; 1; 6	LEC; 2 Ret	JER; 1	JER; 2	POR; 1	POR; 2	9th*	8*

* Season still in progess.

== Notes ==
Awards and achievements
Preceded by Reece Sidebottom	Jon Targett Perpetual Karting Trophy; 2016	Succeeded by Broc Feeney
