= Marino Sato =

Japanese racing driver (born 1999)

- Sato at Silverstone Circuit in 2026
- Nationality: (Japan) Japanese
- Born: 12 May 1999 (age 27) Yokohama, Kanagawa, Japan

European Le Mans Series career
- Debut season: 2023
- Current team: United Autosports
- Categorisation: FIA Silver (2023); FIA Gold (2024–)
- Car number: 21
- Starts: 18 (18 entries)
- Wins: 3
- Podiums: 5
- Poles: 2
- Fastest laps: 0
- Best finish: 2nd in 2023

Previous series
- 2024-2025 2019-22 2019 2017-18 2015-16: FIA World Endurance Championship; FIA Formula 2 Championship; Euroformula Open Championship; FIA Formula 3 European Championship; Italian F4 Championship

Championship titles
- 2019: Euroformula Open Championship

Marino Sato (佐藤万璃音, Satō Marino; born 12 May 1999) is a Japanese racing driver who currently competes in the European Le Mans Series in LMP2 for United Autosports. He previously drove in the FIA World Endurance Championship in LMGT3, in the FIA Formula 2 Championship, and tested for AlphaTauri in Formula One. He is the 2019 Euroformula Open champion.

Sato is not related to former Formula One driver Takuma Sato.

== Early career ==
=== Formula 4 ===
In 2015, Sato competed in the 2015 Italian F4 Championship for Euronova Racing/Vincenzo Sospiri Racing. He finished on the podium once and came tenth in the final standings. Sato would remain with the team for the 2016 Italian F4 Championship. However, even when he won a race at Imola, he only finished 18th in the driver's championship.

=== FIA Formula 3 European Championship ===
==== 2017 ====
Sato progressed to the 2017 FIA Formula 3 European Championship to drive for Motopark. He scored one point during the season and finished 19th in the standings.

==== 2018 ====
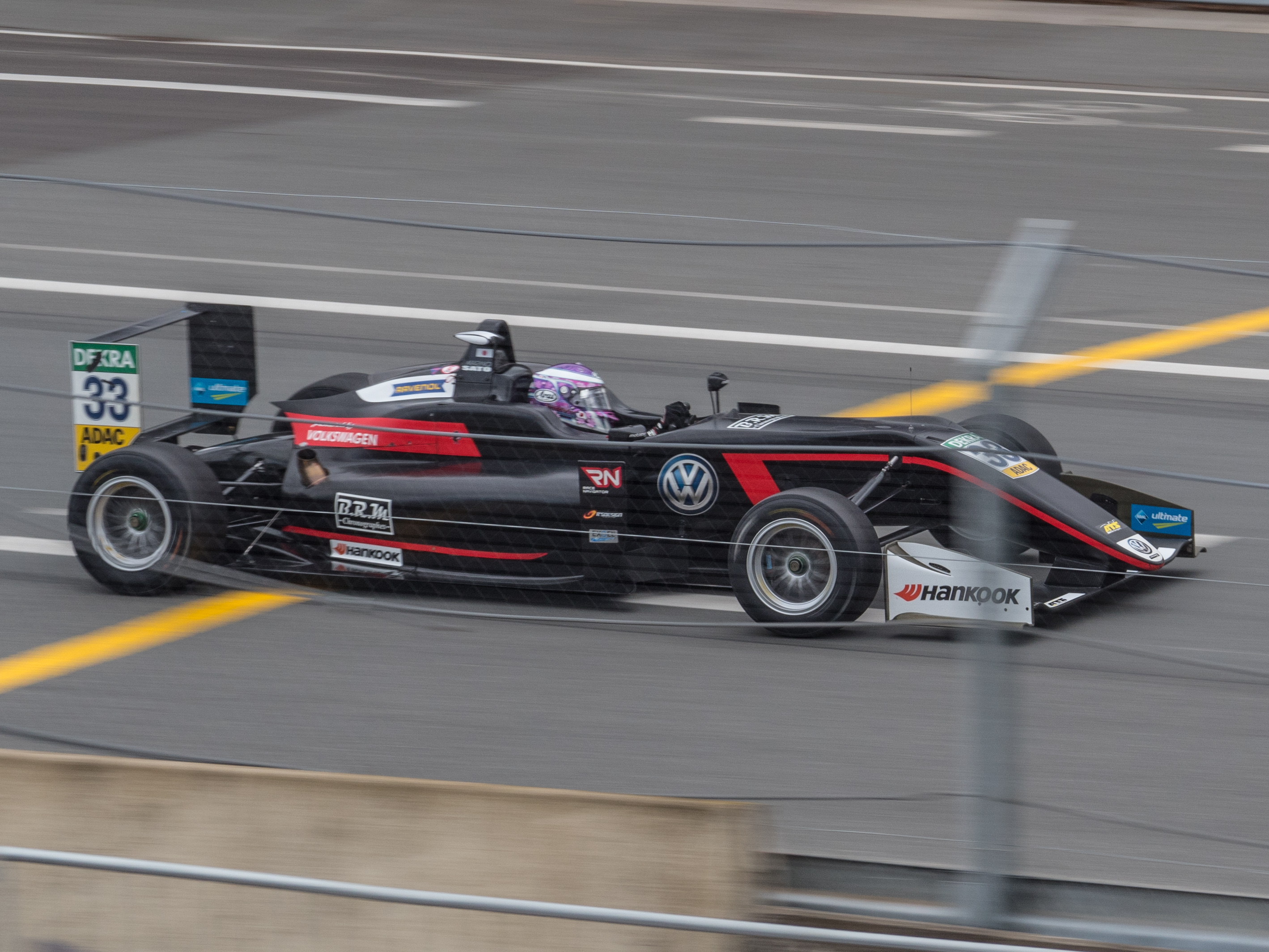
Sato racing during the 2018 FIA Formula 3 European Championship

Despite having been the second-lowest driver in the standings to compete at every event, Sato was retained for the 2018 season. His performance improved compared to 2017, and he finished 16th in the championship.

=== Euroformula Open ===
Sato moved to the Euroformula Open Championship in 2019. He dominated the championship, winning it with nine victories and helped Motopark to win the team championship.

=== FIA Formula 2 Championship ===
==== 2019 ====
In the summer of 2019, Sato progressed to the FIA Formula 2 Championship, replacing Arjun Maini at Campos Racing from the round at Spa-Francorchamps onwards. However, after the fatal accident of Anthoine Hubert, the Japanese racer would not officially make his F2 debut until the Monza feature race, finishing twelfth overall. He improved to eleventh in the sprint, before having a point-less pair of races in Sochi. Sato would briefly challenge for points in the season finale in Yas Marina, albeit it was not enough to earn him a points finish. Despite this, he took part in the post-season test on the week after the final race, driving for Trident.

==== 2020 ====
In 2020, Sato signed for Trident Racing to partner Roy Nissany in the FIA Formula 2 Championship. Sato only managed to score one point at Mugello, and eventually finished 22nd in the standings, four points and three positions behind Nissany.

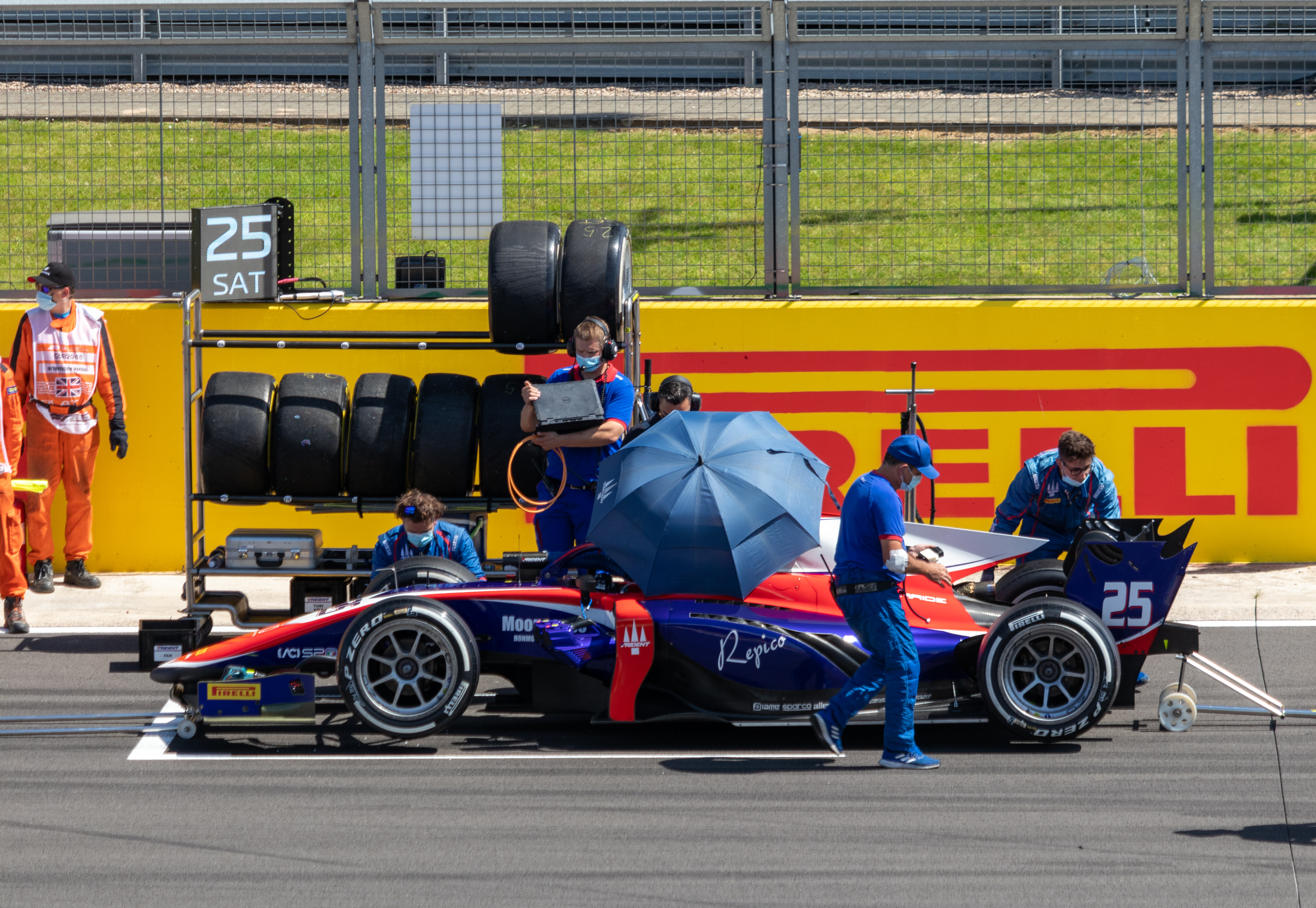
Sato at the 2021 Silverstone Formula 2 round

==== 2021 ====
Despite this, Sato was kept on by Trident for the 2021 season. In the second race of the first round, he equalled his best ever F2 result, finishing eighth and scoring one point. However, this would end up being the only points finish for Sato, as he ended up 21st overall.

==== 2022 ====
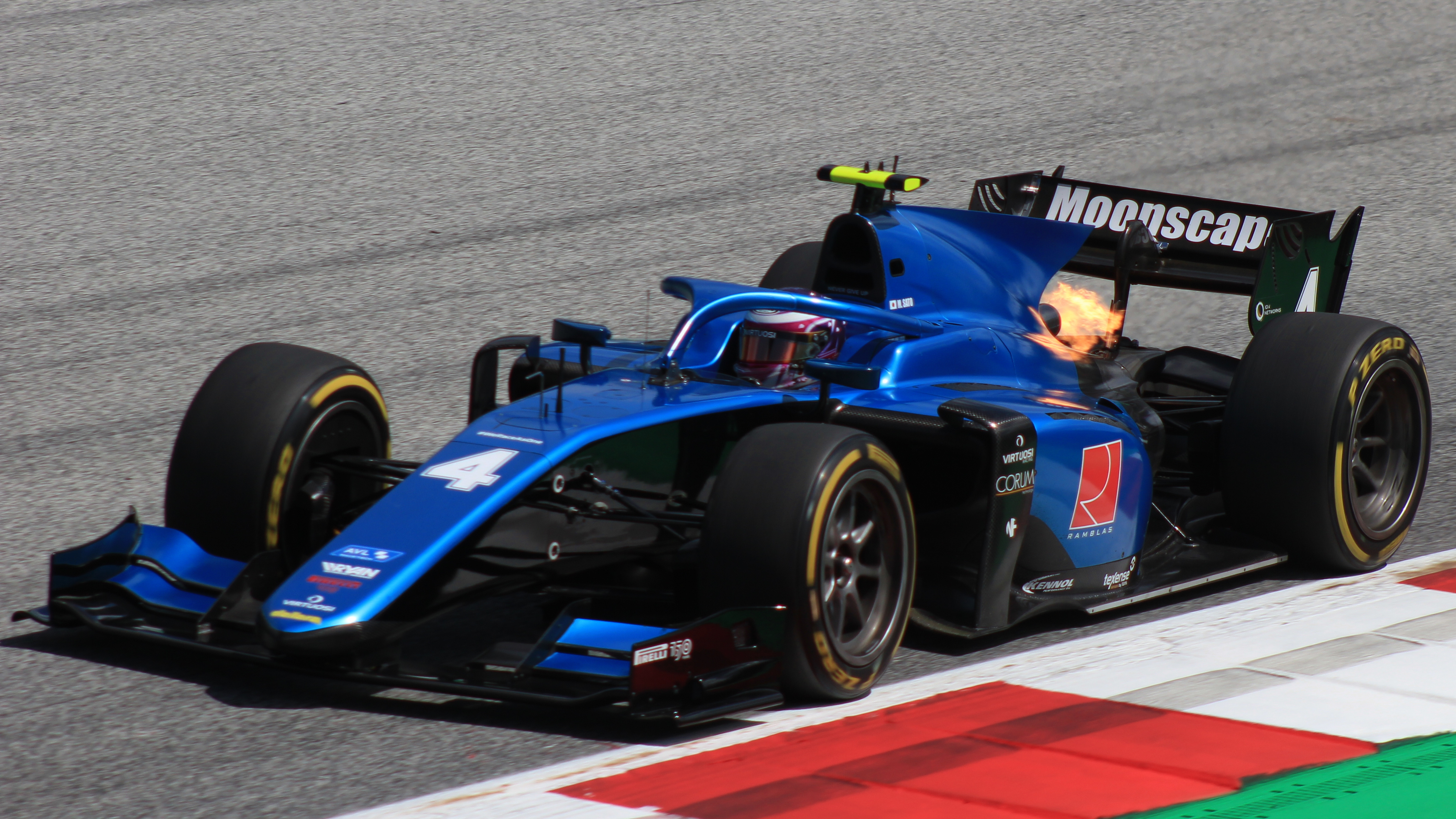
Sato driving the Dallara F2 2018 during the 2022 Spielberg Formula 2 round

Sato remained in the series in 2022, this time joining Virtuosi Racing alongside Jack Doohan. A point-less opening weekend in Bahrain was followed up by his first points finish of the year, as Sato ended up eighth in the sprint race at Jeddah, after which he praised the team for the strong pace. After a pair of rounds that failed to yield any points, the Japanese driver managed to score a point in Monaco with a tenth-place finish, and managed to finish eighth in the subsequent feature race in Baku, having managed to steer clear of trouble in a race of attrition. The following rounds brought with them a heap of bad luck, with Sato experiencing multiple mechanical issues, as well as having a wheel falling off after a pit stop in Zandvoort, a race in which he had fought for points. Having failed to score points in the second half of the season, the Japanese driver finished 22nd in the drivers' standings.

Sato was replaced by Amaury Cordeel at Virtuosi for the 2023 season.

=== Formula One ===
In 2020, Sato drove in the end-of-season Young Driver Test in Abu Dhabi for Scuderia AlphaTauri, alongside fellow countryman Yuki Tsunoda (who would soon become an AlphaTauri race driver). He ended the session with the 13th fastest time (1:38.495), reflecting on that day as one that "made [him] visualise more what [his] dream is".

== Sportscar career ==
=== 2023: ELMS debut ===
For the 2023 season, Sato transitioned into sportscar racing, driving for United Autosports in the LMP2 category of the European Le Mans Series alongside Philip Hanson and Oliver Jarvis. With the help of those two experienced LMP2 racers, Sato managed to take victory thrice, taking his first prototype win at Aragón and sweeping the races at Portimão, which led to the team finishing second in the standings.

=== 2024: FIA World Endurance Championship ===
Following his performances in the European Le Mans Series, Sato was announced to be remaining with United Autosports to make his international sportscar racing debut in the 2024 FIA World Endurance Championship, driving in the newly established LMGT3 class in a McLaren 720S GT3 Evo.

Sato was also originally announced to be competing in the IMSA SportsCar Championship in the LMP2 class for 2024, racing alongside former Formula One driver Paul di Resta, but he later withdrew from the IMSA programme after an upgrade in his FIA driver categorisation from silver to gold, leaving him to "focus fully on the WEC challenge ahead." In December 2023, United would announce that Sato had signed on for a sophomore season in the ELMS, partnering Ben Hanley and Filip Ugran.

=== 2025 ===
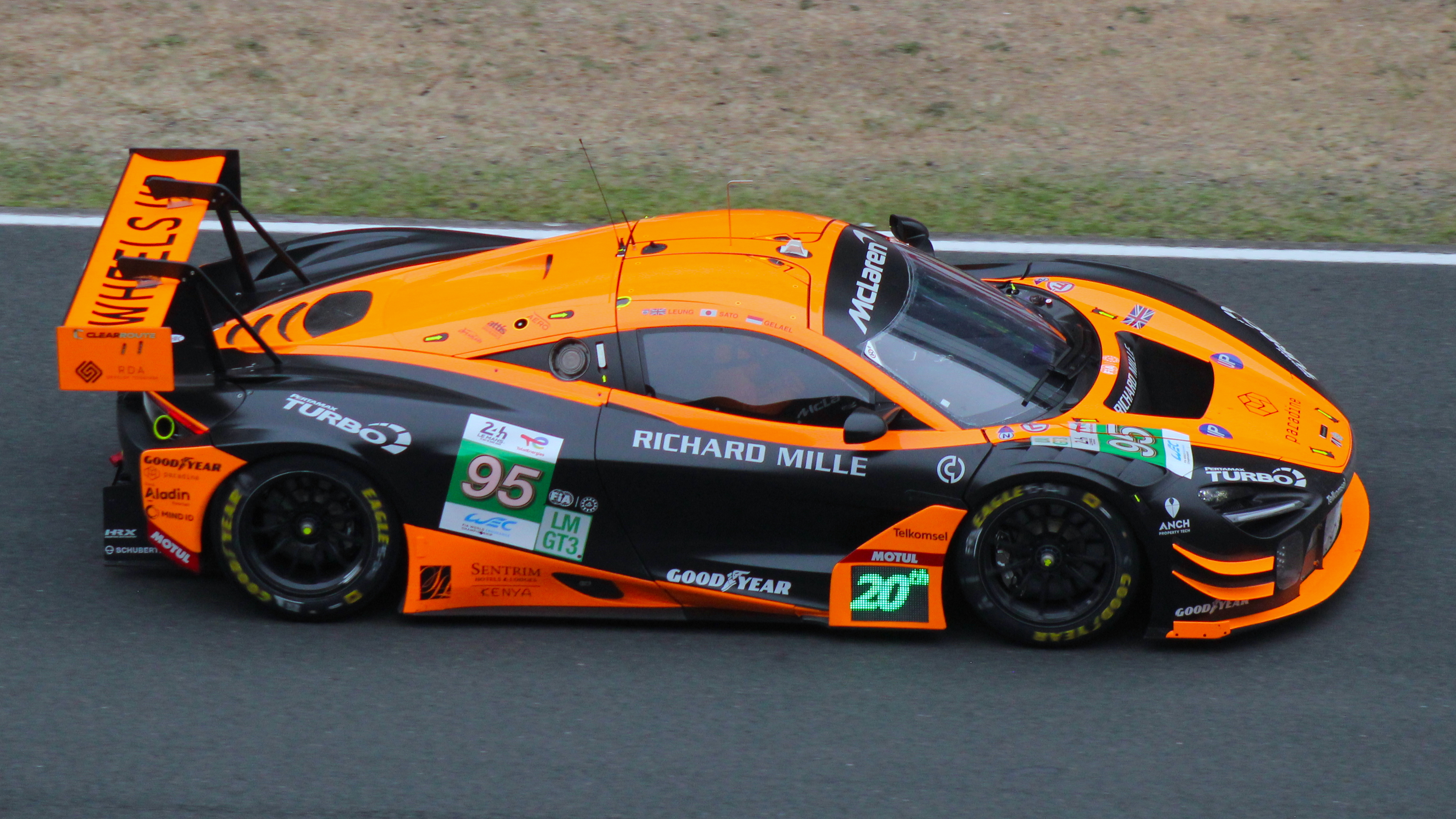
Sato's No. 95 car at the 2025 24 Hours of Le Mans

Sato was retained by United Autosports to drive in the LMGT3 class of the 2025 FIA World Endurance Championship.

== Karting record ==
=== Karting career summary ===
Season	Series	Team	Position
2011	Asian Karting Open Championship — Formula 125 Junior Open		12th
2012	Rotax Max Challenge Grand Finals — Junior	Eiko Japan	28th
2012	SKUSA SuperNationals — TaG Junior	Phil Giebler Racing	13th
2012	Asia-Pacific Championship — KF3	Simon Racing Team	2nd
2013	German Karting Championship — Junior		NC
2013	WSK Master Series — KFJ	Praga Kart Racing	38th
2013	IAME International Final — X30 Junior	Praga Kart Racing	16th
2013	Rotax International Open — Junior	Praga Kart Racing	32nd
2013	WSK Final Cup — KFJ	Praga Kart Racing	32nd
2013	CIK-FIA World Championship — KFJ		66th
2014	South Garda Winter Cup — KF	Praga Kart Racing	19th
2014	WSK Champions Cup — KF	Praga Kart Racing	21st
2014	Rotax Euro Challenge — Senior	Praga Kart Racing	89th
2014	WSK Super Master Series — KF	Praga Kart Racing	37th
2014	CIK-FIA European Championship — KF	Praga Kart Racing	49th
2014	CIK-FIA World Championship — KF	Praga Kart Racing	NC
2014	WSK Final Cup — KF	Praga Kart Racing	25th

== Racing record ==
=== Racing career summary ===
Season	Series	Team	Races	Wins	Poles	F/Laps	Podiums	Points	Position
2015	Italian F4 Championship	Vincenzo Sospiri Racing	21	0	0	1	1	62	10th
2016	Italian F4 Championship	Vincenzo Sospiri Racing	21	1	0	0	1	42	18th
2017	FIA Formula 3 European Championship	Motopark	30	0	0	0	0	1	19th
2017	Macau Grand Prix	Motopark	1	0	0	0	0	N/A	DNF
2018	FIA Formula 3 European Championship	Motopark	30	0	0	0	0	31.5	16th
2018	Macau Grand Prix	Motopark	1	0	0	0	0	N/A	DNF
2019	Euroformula Open Championship	Team Motopark	16	9	6	5	11	307	**1st**
2019	FIA Formula 2 Championship	Campos Racing	6	0	0	0	0	0	21st
2020	FIA Formula 2 Championship	Trident	24	0	0	0	0	1	22nd
2021	FIA Formula 2 Championship	Trident	23	0	0	0	0	1	21st
2022	FIA Formula 2 Championship	Virtuosi Racing	28	0	0	0	0	6	22nd
2023	European Le Mans Series - LMP2	United Autosports USA	6	3	0	0	3	100	**2nd**
2024	FIA World Endurance Championship - LMGT3	United Autosports	8	0	0	0	1	36	18th
2024	European Le Mans Series - LMP2	United Autosports	6	0	0	0	1	29	10th
2024	Porsche Carrera Cup Japan	Ponos Racing	2	0	0	0	1	20.5	16th
2025	FIA World Endurance Championship - LMGT3	United Autosports	8	1	0	0	1	43	11th
2025	European Le Mans Series - LMP2 Pro-Am	United Autosports	6	0	0	0	1	62	7th
2025-26	Asian Le Mans Series - LMP2	PONOS Racing	5	0	0	0	0	2	18th
2026	European Le Mans Series - LMP2 Pro-Am	United Autosports	6	0	0	0	2	46	7th

=== Complete Italian F4 Championship results ===
(key) (Races in bold indicate pole position; races in italics indicate fastest lap)

Year	Entrant	1	2	3	4	5	6	7	8	9	10	11	12	13	14	15	16	17	18	19	20	21	22	23	DC	Points
2015	Vincenzo Sospiri Racing	VLL; 1; 7	VLL; 2; 7	VLL; 3; 9	MNZ; 1; 13	MNZ; 2; 9	MNZ; 3; 8	IMO1; 1; 4	IMO1; 2 Ret	IMO1; 3; 13	MUG; 1; 14	MUG; 2; 18	MUG; 3; 16	ADR; 1; 6	ADR; 2; 2	ADR; 3; 14	IMO2; 1; 13	IMO2; 2; 21†	IMO2; 3; 15	MIS; 1 Ret	MIS; 2; 4	MIS; 3; 5			10th	62
2016	Vincenzo Sospiri Racing	MIS; 1; 27	MIS; 2; 11	MIS; 3	MIS; 4; 22	ADR; 1; 13	ADR; 2	ADR; 3; 4	ADR; 4; 8	IMO1; 1; 11	IMO1; 2; 21	IMO1; 3; 16	MUG; 1; 15	MUG; 2; 17	MUG; 3; 12	VLL; 1; 19	VLL; 2; 15	VLL; 3 Ret	IMO2; 1; 7	IMO2; 2; 8	IMO2; 3; 1	MNZ; 1 Ret	MNZ; 2; 10	MNZ; 3 Ret	18th	42

=== Complete FIA Formula 3 European Championship results ===
(key) (Races in bold indicate pole position; races in italics indicate fastest lap)

Year	Entrant	Engine	1	2	3	4	5	6	7	8	9	10	11	12	13	14	15	16	17	18	19	20	21	22	23	24	25	26	27	28	29	30	DC	Points
2017	Motopark	Volkswagen	SIL; 1; 16	SIL; 2; 12	SIL; 3; 18	MNZ; 1; 13	MNZ; 2; 11	MNZ; 3; 12	PAU; 1; 14	PAU; 2 Ret	PAU; 3; 13	HUN; 1; 16	HUN; 2; 16	HUN; 3; 15	NOR; 1; 13	NOR; 2; 16	NOR; 3; 13	SPA; 1; 15	SPA; 2; 11	SPA; 3; 14	ZAN; 1; 15	ZAN; 2; 18	ZAN; 3; 17	NÜR; 1; 16	NÜR; 2 Ret	NÜR; 3; 12	RBR; 1; 14	RBR; 2; 16	RBR; 3; 10	HOC; 1; 18	HOC; 2; 19	HOC; 3; 16	19th	1
2018	Motopark	Volkswagen	PAU; 1; 9	PAU; 2; 18	PAU; 3; 10‡	HUN; 1; 15	HUN; 2; 13	HUN; 3; 16	NOR; 1; 8	NOR; 2; 7	NOR; 3; 13	ZAN; 1; 19	ZAN; 2; 10	ZAN; 3; 4	SPA; 1; 7	SPA; 2; 15	SPA; 3; 16	SIL; 1; 12	SIL; 2; 17	SIL; 3; 14	MIS; 1; 15	MIS; 2; 12	MIS; 3 Ret	NÜR; 1 Ret	NÜR; 2 Ret	NÜR; 3; 18	RBR; 1; 14	RBR; 2; 13	RBR; 3; 21	HOC; 1; 19	HOC; 2; 14	HOC; 3; 16	16th	31.5

^{‡} Half points awarded as less than 75% of race distance was completed.

=== Complete Macau Grand Prix results ===
Year	Team	Car	Qualifying	Quali Race	Main race
2017	(Germany) Motopark	Dallara F317	15th	14th	DNF
2018	(Germany) Motopark	Dallara F317	7th	11th	DNF

=== Complete Euroformula Open Championship results ===
(key) (Races in bold indicate pole position; races in italics indicate points for the fastest lap of top ten finishers)

Year	Entrant	1	2	3	4	5	6	7	8	9	10	11	12	13	14	15	16	17	18	DC	Points
2019	Team Motopark	LEC; 1; 5	LEC; 2; 1	PAU; 1; 3	PAU; 2; 6	**HOC**; **1**; 1	**HOC**; **2**; 2	**SPA**; **1**; 1	**SPA**; **2**; 1	HUN; 1; 1	HUN; 2; 1	**RBR**; **1**; 1	**RBR**; **2**; 1	SIL; 1	SIL; 2	CAT; 1; 10†	CAT; 2; 5	MNZ; 1; 1	MNZ; 2; 5	1st	307

=== Complete FIA Formula 2 Championship results ===
(key) (Races in bold indicate pole position; races in italics indicate points for the fastest lap of top ten finishers)

Year	Entrant	1	2	3	4	5	6	7	8	9	10	11	12	13	14	15	16	17	18	19	20	21	22	23	24	25	26	27	28	DC	Points
2019	Campos Racing	BHR; FEA	BHR; SPR	BAK; FEA	BAK; SPR	CAT; FEA	CAT; SPR	MON; FEA	MON; SPR	LEC; FEA	LEC; SPR	RBR; SPR	RBR; SPR	SIL; FEA	SIL; SPR	HUN; FEA	HUN; SPR	SPA; FEA; C	SPA; SPR; C	MNZ; FEA; 12	MNZ; SPR; 11	SOC; FEA; 16	SOC; SPR; 15	YMC; FEA; 18	YMC; SPR; 16					21st	0
2020	Trident	RBR; FEA; Ret	RBR; SPR; 17	RBR; FEA; 16	RBR; SPR; Ret	HUN; FEA; Ret	HUN; SPR; 20	SIL; FEA; 20	SIL; SPR; 12	SIL; FEA; 17	SIL; SPR; 17	CAT; FEA; 15	CAT; SPR; 21	SPA; FEA; 14	SPA; SPR; Ret	MNZ; FEA; 20	MNZ; SPR; 13	MUG; FEA; 14	MUG; SPR; 8	SOC; FEA; 13	SOC; SPR; 15	BHR; FEA; 20	BHR; SPR; 11	BHR; FEA; 17	BHR; SPR; 16					22nd	1
2021	Trident	BHR; SP1; 15	BHR; SP2; 8	BHR; FEA; 14	MCO; SP1; 19†	MCO; SP2; Ret	MCO; FEA; 14	BAK; SP1; 18	BAK; SP2; 13	BAK; FEA; 15	SIL; SP1; NC	SIL; SP2; 16	SIL; FEA; 19	MNZ; SP1; NC	MNZ; SP2; 20	MNZ; FEA; Ret	SOC; SP1; 14	SOC; SP2; C	SOC; FEA; 14	JED; SP1; Ret	JED; SP2; 13	JED; FEA; 18	YMC; SP1; 19	YMC; SP2; 16	YMC; FEA; 17					21st	1
2022	Virtuosi Racing	BHR; SPR; 16	BHR; FEA; 11	JED; SPR; 8	JED; FEA; 17	IMO; SPR; 16	IMO; FEA; 11	CAT; SPR; 17	CAT; FEA; 19	MCO; SPR; 15	MCO; FEA; 10	BAK; SPR; 17†	BAK; FEA; 8	SIL; SPR; Ret	SIL; FEA; 15	RBR; SPR; Ret	RBR; FEA; 16	LEC; SPR; 9	LEC; FEA; Ret	HUN; SPR; 15	HUN; FEA; 15	SPA; SPR; 12	SPA; FEA; 15	ZAN; SPR; 19	ZAN; FEA; Ret	MNZ; SPR; 11	MNZ; FEA; 11	YMC; SPR; 19	YMC; FEA; 15	22nd	6

^{†} Driver did not finish the race, but was classified as they completed more than 90% of the race distance.
* Season still in progress.

=== Complete European Le Mans Series results ===
(key) (Races in bold indicate pole position; results in italics indicate fastest lap)

Year	Entrant	Class	Chassis	Engine	1	2	3	4	5	6	Rank	Points
2023	United Autosports USA	LMP2	Oreca 07	Gibson GK428 4.2 L V8	CAT; 6	LEC; 7	**ARA**; 1	SPA; 5	POR; 1	ALG; 1	2nd	100
2024	United Autosports	LMP2	Oreca 07	Gibson GK428 4.2 L V8	**CAT**; 3	LEC; 5	IMO; 11	SPA; 9	MUG; 11	ALG; 10	10th	29
2025	United Autosports	LMP2 Pro-Am	Oreca 07	Gibson GK428 4.2 L V8	CAT; 5	LEC; 5	IMO; 6	SPA; 2	SIL; 5	ALG; 7	7th	62
2026	United Autosports	LMP2 Pro-Am	Oreca 07	Gibson GK428 4.2 L V8	CAT; 7	LEC; 8	IMO; 3	SPA; 10	SIL; 2	ALG; 9	7th	46

=== Complete FIA World Endurance Championship results ===
(key) (Races in bold indicate pole position; races in italics indicate fastest lap)

Year	Entrant	Class	Car	Engine	1	2	3	4	5	6	7	8	Rank	Points
2024	United Autosports	LMGT3	McLaren 720S GT3 Evo	McLaren M840T 4.0 L Turbo V8	QAT; 13	IMO; 6	SPA; Ret	LMS; Ret	SÃO; 3	COA; 7	FUJ; 17	**BHR**; 8	18th	36
2025	United Autosports	LMGT3	McLaren 720S GT3 Evo	McLaren M840T 4.0 L Turbo V8	**QAT**; 7	IMO; 9	SPA; Ret	LMS; Ret	SÃO; 9	COA; 1	FUJ; 10	BHR; 9	11th	43

=== Complete 24 Hours of Le Mans results ===
Year	Team	Co-Drivers	Car	Class	Laps	Pos.	Class Pos.
2024	(United Kingdom) United Autosports	(Japan) Hiroshi Hamaguchi (Chile) Nico Pino	McLaren 720S GT3 Evo	LMGT3	212	DNF	DNF
2025	(United Kingdom) United Autosports	(Indonesia) Sean Gelael (United Kingdom) Darren Leung	McLaren 720S GT3 Evo	LMGT3	80	DNF	DNF

=== Complete Asian Le Mans Series results ===
(key) (Races in bold indicate pole position) (Races in italics indicate fastest lap)

Year	Team	Class	Car	Engine	1	2	3	4	5	6	Pos.	Points
2025–26	PONOS Racing	LMP2	Oreca 07	Gibson GK428 4.2 L V8	SEP; 1; 15	SEP; 2 WD	DUB; 1; 12	DUB; 2; 11	ABU; 1; 12	ABU; 2; 9	18th	2

Sporting positions
Preceded by Felipe Drugovich	Euroformula Open Championship; Champion; 2019	Succeeded by Yifei Ye
