= 2022 Silverstone Formula 3 round =

Motor racing event

(United Kingdom) 2022 Silverstone Formula 3 round
Round details
- Round 4 of 9 in the 2022 FIA Formula 3 Championship.
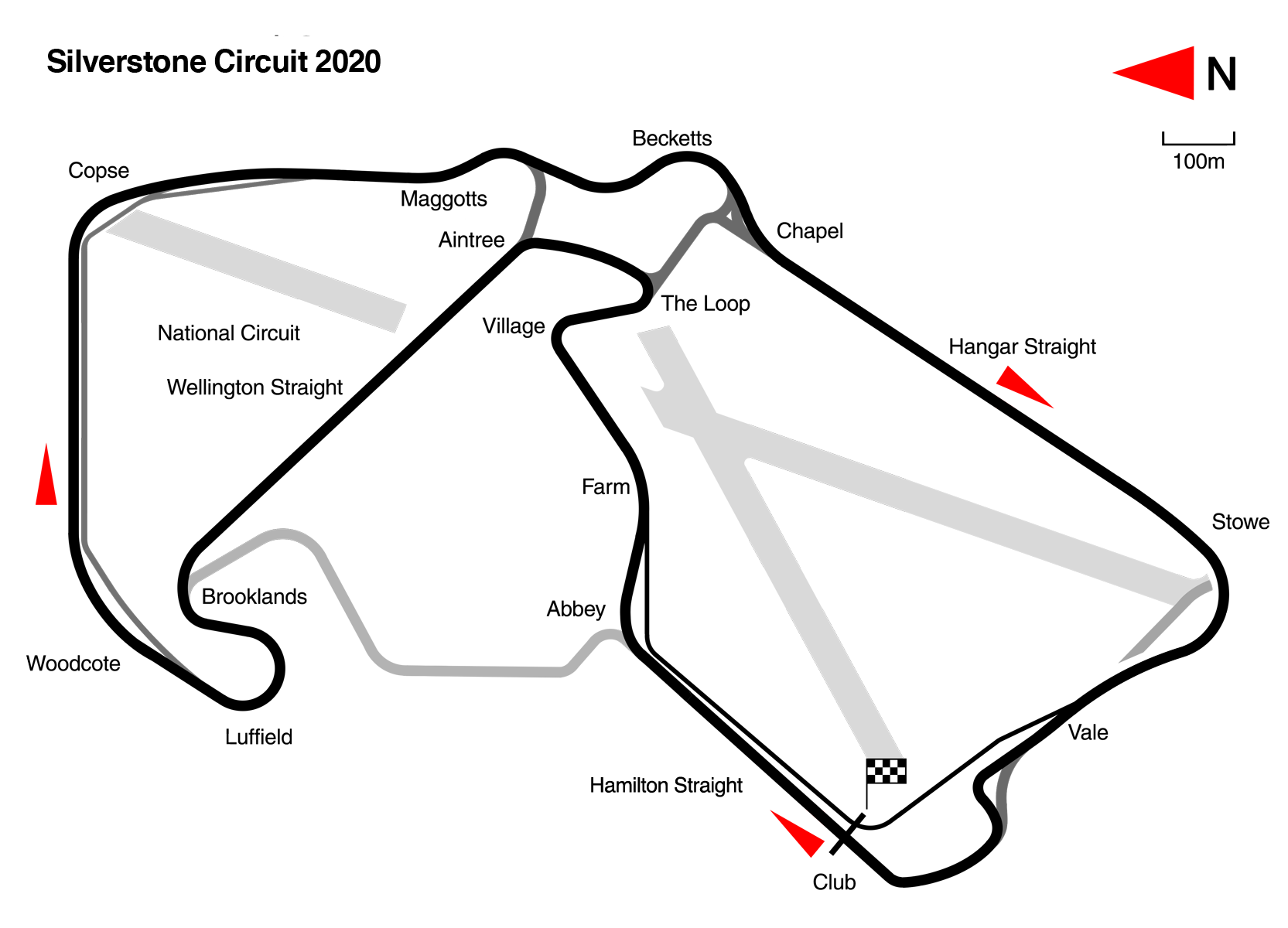
- Location: Silverstone Circuit, Silverstone, United Kingdom
- Course: Permanent Circuit; 5.891 km (3.661 mi)

Sprint Race
- Date: 2 July 2022
- Laps: 18
Podium
First	(France) Isack Hadjar	Hitech Grand Prix
Second	(France) Victor Martins	ART Grand Prix
Third	(United Kingdom) Reece Ushijima	Van Amersfoort Racing
Fastest lap
Driver	(France) Isack Hadjar	Hitech Grand Prix
- Time: 1:46.643 (on lap 17)

Feature Race
- Date: 3 July 2022
- Laps: 22
Pole position
Driver	(United Kingdom) Zak O'Sullivan	Carlin
Time	1:44.597	
Podium
First	(Monaco) Arthur Leclerc	Prema Racing
Second	(United Kingdom) Zak O'Sullivan	Carlin
Third	(United Kingdom) Oliver Bearman	Prema Racing
Fastest lap
Driver	(United States) Jak Crawford	Prema Racing
- Time: 1:46.713 (on lap 22)

The 2022 Silverstone Formula 3 round was a motor racing event held on 2 and 3 July 2022 at the Silverstone Circuit, Silverstone, United Kingdom. It was the fourth round of the 2022 FIA Formula 3 Championship, and was held in support of the 2022 British Grand Prix.

== Driver changes ==
Multiple driver changes took place for the fourth round at the Silverstone Circuit. On the weekend before the Silverstone round, Trident confirmed that Jonny Edgar would return to the series after missing the previous two rounds following Crohn's disease he sustained on early April 2022.

Zdeněk Chovanec also returned to the championship after last competing at the 2021 Sochi Formula 3 round, driving for Charouz Racing System.

Following the 2022 Russian invasion of Ukraine, MP Motorsport driver Alexander Smolyar was denied of getting a visa for the entry into the United Kingdom. Hence, he was not able to take part at the fourth round in Silverstone and was then replaced by Romanian driver Filip Ugran, who returned to the series after competing in the previous season.

== Classification ==
=== Qualifying ===
Rookie and Carlin driver Zak O'Sullivan took his maiden Formula 3 pole position on home soil ahead of Arthur Leclerc and Zane Maloney.

Pos.	No.	Driver	Team	Time/Gap	R1	R2
1	26	(United Kingdom) Zak O'Sullivan	Carlin	1:44.597	12	1
2	4	(Monaco) Arthur Leclerc	Prema Racing	+0.027	11	2
3	3	(Barbados) Zane Maloney	Trident	+0.041	10	3
4	10	(Brazil) Caio Collet	MP Motorsport	+0.186	9	4
5	5	(United States) Jak Crawford	Prema Racing	+0.208	8	5
6	6	(United Kingdom) Oliver Bearman	Prema Racing	+0.266	7	6
7	17	(United States) Kaylen Frederick	Hitech Grand Prix	+0.279	6	7
8	2	(Czech Republic) Roman Staněk	Trident	+0.323	5	8
9	18	(France) Isack Hadjar	Hitech Grand Prix	+0.325	4	9
10	12	(India) Kush Maini	MP Motorsport	+0.333	3	10
11	7	(France) Victor Martins	ART Grand Prix	+0.361	2	11
12	31	(United Kingdom) Reece Ushijima (Note: Ushijima is a Japanese-American driver competing under a British licence.)	Van Amersfoort Racing	+0.415	1	12
13	20	(Spain) David Vidales	Campos Racing	+0.431	13	13
14	1	(United Kingdom) Jonny Edgar	Trident	+0.451	14	14
15	8	(Switzerland) Grégoire Saucy	ART Grand Prix	+0.606	15	15
16	9	(United States) Juan Manuel Correa	ART Grand Prix	+0.643	16	16
17	29	(Argentina) Franco Colapinto	Van Amersfoort Racing	+0.703	17	17
18	21	(United States) Hunter Yeany	Campos Racing	+0.971	18	18
19	16	(Italy) Francesco Pizzi	Charouz Racing System	+0.979	19	19
20	23	(Israel) Ido Cohen	Jenzer Motorsport	+1.121	20	20
21	25	(Finland) William Alatalo	Jenzer Motorsport	+1.213	21	21
22	19	(Malaysia) Nazim Azman	Hitech Grand Prix	+1.218	22	22
23	27	(United States) Brad Benavides (Note: Benavides is an American-Spanish-Guatemalan driver who competed under a Spanish licence in rounds 1–3 and an American licence in rounds 4–9.)	Carlin	+1.258	23	23
24	24	(Italy) Federico Malvestiti	Jenzer Motorsport	+1.322	24	24
25	30	(Mexico) Rafael Villagómez	Van Amersfoort Racing	+1.337	25	25
26	28	(Italy) Enzo Trulli	Carlin	+1.391	26	26
27	11	(Romania) Filip Ugran	MP Motorsport	+1.454	27	27
28	15	(Portugal) Zdeněk Chovanec (Note: Chovanec is a Czech-Venezuelan driver competing under a Portuguese licence.)	Charouz Racing System	+3.116	28	28
29	14	(Hungary) László Tóth	Charouz Racing System	+3.441	29	29
107% time: 1:54.719
—	22	(Spain) Pepe Martí	Campos Racing	No time set	30	30

=== Sprint race ===
Pos.	No.	Driver	Team	Laps	Time/Gap	Grid	Pts.
1	18	(France) Isack Hadjar	Hitech Grand Prix	17	32:24.707	4	10 (1)
2	7	(France) Victor Martins	ART Grand Prix	17	+0.757	2	9
3	31	(United Kingdom) Reece Ushijima	Van Amersfoort Racing	17	+1.359	1	8
4	12	(India) Kush Maini	MP Motorsport	17	+2.916	3	7
5	17	(United States) Kaylen Frederick	Hitech Grand Prix	17	+5.827	6	6
6	2	(Czech Republic) Roman Staněk	Trident	17	+6.549	5	5
7	3	(Barbados) Zane Maloney	Trident	17	+7.296	10	4
8	4	(Monaco) Arthur Leclerc	Prema Racing	17	+7.693	11	3
9	6	(United Kingdom) Oliver Bearman	Prema Racing	17	+7.988	7	2
10	5	(United States) Jak Crawford	Prema Racing	17	+8.552	8	1
11	10	(Brazil) Caio Collet	MP Motorsport	17	+9.252	9	
12	20	(Spain) David Vidales	Campos Racing	17	+10.966	13	
13	29	(Argentina) Franco Colapinto	Van Amersfoort Racing	17	+11.235	17	
14	26	(United Kingdom) Zak O'Sullivan	Carlin	17	+12.320	12	
15	1	(United Kingdom) Jonny Edgar	Trident	17	+12.909	14	
16	21	(United States) Hunter Yeany	Campos Racing	17	+13.364	18	
17	23	(Israel) Ido Cohen	Jenzer Motorsport	17	+14.009	20	
18	8	(Switzerland) Grégoire Saucy	ART Grand Prix	17	+14.367	15	
19	25	(Finland) William Alatalo	Jenzer Motorsport	17	+14.999	21	
20	22	(Spain) Pepe Martí	Campos Racing	17	+15.247	30	
21	9	(United States) Juan Manuel Correa	ART Grand Prix	17	+16.901	16	
22	19	(Malaysia) Nazim Azman	Hitech Grand Prix	17	+17.739	22	
23	11	(Romania) Filip Ugran	MP Motorsport	17	+18.932	27	
24	16	(Italy) Francesco Pizzi	Charouz Racing System	17	+21.127	19	
25	24	(Italy) Federico Malvestiti	Jenzer Motorsport	17	+21.369	24	
26	30	(Mexico) Rafael Villagómez	Van Amersfoort Racing	17	+23.276^{1}	29	
27	28	(Italy) Enzo Trulli	Carlin	17	+23.319	19	
NC	27	(United States) Brad Benavides	Carlin	11	+6 laps	23	
DNF	14	(Hungary) László Tóth	Charouz Racing System	10	Collision damage	29	
DNF	15	(Portugal) Zdeněk Chovanec	Charouz Racing System	9	Collision damage	28	
Fastest lap set by (France) Isack Hadjar: 1:46.643 (lap 17)

Notes:

- ^1 – Rafael Villagómez received a five-second time penalty for lining up on the grid outside of the confines of his grid box, which is a breach of Article 37.9 of the FIA Formula 3 Sporting Regulations. Both Charouz drivers László Tóth and Zdeněk Chovanec received the same penalty, but the penalties became invalid as they eventually retired from the Sprint Race.

=== Feature race ===
Pos.	No.	Driver	Team	Laps	Time/Gap	Grid	Pts.
1	4	(Monaco) Arthur Leclerc	Prema Racing	22	45:23.209	2	25
2	26	(United Kingdom) Zak O'Sullivan	Carlin	22	+0.913	1	18 (2)
3	6	(United Kingdom) Oliver Bearman	Prema Racing	22	+0.964	6	15
4	10	(Brazil) Caio Collet	MP Motorsport	22	+1.273	4	12
5	18	(France) Isack Hadjar	Hitech Grand Prix	22	+1.658	9	10
6	5	(United States) Jak Crawford	Prema Racing	22	+2.349	5	8 (1)
7	7	(France) Victor Martins	ART Grand Prix	22	+4.012	11	6
8	1	(United Kingdom) Jonny Edgar	Trident	22	+4.658	14	4
9	20	(Spain) David Vidales	Campos Racing	22	+5.847	13	2
10	31	(United Kingdom) Reece Ushijima	Van Amersfoort Racing	22	+6.616	12	1
11	3	(Barbados) Zane Maloney	Trident	22	+8.011	3	
12	17	(United States) Kaylen Frederick	Hitech Grand Prix	22	+9.878	7	
13	24	(Italy) Federico Malvestiti	Jenzer Motorsport	22	+14.364	24	
14	16	(Italy) Francesco Pizzi	Charouz Racing System	22	+15.097	19	
15	23	(Israel) Ido Cohen	Jenzer Motorsport	22	+15.591	20	
16	25	(Finland) William Alatalo	Jenzer Motorsport	22	+16.562	21	
17	28	(Italy) Enzo Trulli	Carlin	22	+17.102	26	
18	11	(Romania) Filip Ugran	MP Motorsport	22	+17.957	27	
19	21	(United States) Hunter Yeany	Campos Racing	22	+20.445	18	
20	27	(United States) Brad Benavides	Carlin	22	+22.522^{2}	23	
21	14	(Hungary) László Tóth	Charouz Racing System	22	+24.304	28	
22	12	(India) Kush Maini	MP Motorsport	22	+25.179^{2}	10	
23	22	(Spain) Pepe Martí	Campos Racing	22	+29.432	29	
24	15	(Portugal) Zdeněk Chovanec	Charouz Racing System	22	+30.100	30^{3}	
25	8	(Switzerland) Grégoire Saucy	ART Grand Prix	22	+37.328^{4}	15	
DNF	19	(Malaysia) Nazim Azman	Hitech Grand Prix	9	Collision	22	
DNF	30	(Mexico) Rafael Villagómez	Van Amersfoort Racing	9	Collision	25	
DNF	2	(Czech Republic) Roman Staněk	Trident	9	Puncture damage	8	
DNF	9	(United States) Juan Manuel Correa	ART Grand Prix	1	Retired	16	
DNF	29	(Argentina) Franco Colapinto	Van Amersfoort Racing	0	Collision damage	17	
Fastest lap set by (United States) Jak Crawford: 1:46.713 (lap 22)

Notes:

- ^2 – Brad Benavides and Kush Maini both received a five-second time penalty for exceeding track limits multiple times.
- ^3 – Zdeněk Chovanec received a three-place grid penalty for causing a collision with László Tóth in the Sprint race.
- ^4 – Grégoire Saucy received a ten-second time penalty for causing a collision with Roman Staněk.

== Standings after the event ==
Drivers' Championship standings

	Pos.	Driver	Points
	1	(France) Victor Martins	77
3	2	(Monaco) Arthur Leclerc	71
1	3	(France) Isack Hadjar	68
2	4	(Czech Republic) Roman Staněk	61
2	5	(United States) Jak Crawford	60

Teams' Championship standings

	Pos.	Team	Points
	1	(Italy) Prema Racing	175
	2	(France) ART Grand Prix	113
1	3	(United Kingdom) Hitech Grand Prix	90
1	4	(Italy) Trident	88
	5	(Netherlands) MP Motorsport	75

- Note: Only the top five positions are included for both sets of standings.

== See also ==
- 2022 British Grand Prix
- 2022 Silverstone Formula 2 round

== Notes ==
Previous round: 2022 Barcelona Formula 3 round	FIA Formula 3 Championship; 2022 season	Next round: 2022 Spielberg Formula 3 round
Previous round: 2020 2nd Silverstone Formula 3 round	Silverstone Formula 3 round	Next round: 2023 Silverstone Formula 3 round
