= 2022 Imola Formula 3 round =

Motor racing competition

(Italy) 2022 Imola Formula 3 round
Round details
- Round 2 of 9 in the 2022 FIA Formula 3 Championship.
- Layout of the Autodromo Internazionale Enzo e Dino Ferrari
- Location: Autodromo Internazionale Enzo e Dino Ferrari; Imola, Emilia-Romagna, Italy
- Course: Permanent racing facility 4.909 km (3.050 mi)

Sprint Race
- Date: 23 April 2022
- Laps: 20
Podium
First	(Argentina) Franco Colapinto	Van Amersfoort Racing
Second	(France) Victor Martins	ART Grand Prix
Third	(United States) Jak Crawford	Prema Racing
Fastest lap
Driver	(United Kingdom) Oliver Bearman	Prema Racing
- Time: 1:33.573 (on lap 5)

Feature Race
- Date: 24 April 2022
- Laps: 24
Pole position
Driver	(Barbados) Zane Maloney	Trident
Time	1:41.180	
Podium
First	(Czech Republic) Roman Staněk	Trident
Second	(United States) Jak Crawford	Prema Racing
Third	(France) Isack Hadjar	Hitech Grand Prix
Fastest lap
Driver	(Czech Republic) Roman Staněk	Trident
- Time: 1.33.129 (on lap 18)

The 2022 Imola FIA Formula 3 round was a motor racing event held on 23 and 24 April 2022 at the Autodromo Internazionale Enzo e Dino Ferrari, Imola, Italy. It is the second round of the 2022 FIA Formula 3 Championship, and is held in support of the 2022 Emilia Romagna Grand Prix.

== Driver changes ==
Multiple driver changes took place for the second round at the Imola Circuit. Trident driver Jonny Edgar pulled out of the championship after being diagnosed with Crohn's disease and was replaced by former HWA Racelab driver Oliver Rasmussen.

Federico Malvestiti returned to the championship after a year's absence, replacing Niko Kari at Jenzer Motorsport.

Charouz Racing System driver Ayrton Simmons vacated his seat and was replaced by David Schumacher, who previously raced with the team in 2020.

ART Grand Prix fielded only two cars at Imola, as Juan Manuel Correa was forced to miss the event due to a foot injury.

== Classification ==
=== Qualifying ===
Qualifying took place on 22 April 2022, with Barbadian Zane Maloney taking his maiden pole position for Trident.

Pos.	No.	Driver	Team	Time/Gap	Grid
1	3	(Barbados) Zane Maloney	Trident	1.41.180	1
2	2	(Czech Republic) Roman Staněk	Trident	+0.107	2
3	5	(United States) Jak Crawford	Prema Racing	+0.116	3
4	8	(Switzerland) Grégoire Saucy	ART Grand Prix	+0.117	4
5	6	(United Kingdom) Oliver Bearman	Prema Racing	+0.409	5
6	7	(France) Victor Martins	ART Grand Prix	+0.765	6
7	18	(France) Isack Hadjar	Hitech Grand Prix	+0.791	7
8	26	(United Kingdom) Zak O'Sullivan	Carlin	+0.825	8
9	10	(Brazil) Caio Collet	MP Motorsport	+0.989	9
10	12	(India) Kush Maini	MP Motorsport	+1.121	10
11	23	(Israel) Ido Cohen	Jenzer Motorsport	+1.328	11
12	29	(Argentina) Franco Colapinto	Van Amersfoort Racing	+1.440	12
13	17	(United States) Kaylen Frederick	Hitech Grand Prix	+1.465	13
14	1	(Denmark) Oliver Rasmussen	Trident	+1.549	14
15	11	Alexander Smolyar	MP Motorsport	+1.660	15
16	21	(United States) Hunter Yeany	Campos Racing	+1.950	16
17	19	(Malaysia) Nazim Azman	Hitech Grand Prix	+2.004	17
18	25	(Finland) William Alatalo	Jenzer Motorsport	+2.143	18
19	16	(Italy) Francesco Pizzi	Charouz Racing System	+2.155	19
20	30	(Mexico) Rafael Villagómez	Van Amersfoort Racing	+2.229	20
21	4	(Monaco) Arthur Leclerc	Prema Racing	+2.439	21
22	31	(United Kingdom) Reece Ushijima (Note: Ushijima is a Japanese-American driver competing under a British licence.)	Van Amersfoort Racing	+2.535	22
23	27	(Spain) Brad Benavides (Note: Benavides is an American-Spanish-Guatemalan driver competing under a Spanish licence.)	Carlin	+2.903	23
24	22	(Spain) Pepe Martí	Campos Racing	+3.093	24
25	24	(Italy) Federico Malvestiti	Jenzer Motorsport	+3.214	25
26	14	(Hungary) László Tóth	Charouz Racing System	+3.247	26
27	20	(Spain) David Vidales	Campos Racing	+3.291	27
28	28	(Italy) Enzo Trulli	Carlin	+4.370	28
29	15	(Germany) David Schumacher	Charouz Racing System	+5.251	29
107% time: 1:48.263

=== Sprint Race ===
Pos.	No.	Driver	Team	Laps	Time/Gap	Grid	Pts.
1	29	(Argentina) Franco Colapinto	Van Amersfoort Racing	20	36.38.273	1	10
2	7	(France) Victor Martins	ART Grand Prix	20	+2.640	6	9
3	5	(United States) Jak Crawford	Prema Racing	20	+2.700	9	8
4	2	(Czech Republic) Roman Staněk	Trident	20	+3.634	10	7
5	18	(France) Isack Hadjar	Hitech Grand Prix	20	+4.088	5	6
6	3	(Barbados) Zane Maloney	Trident	20	+4.651	12	5
7	1	(Denmark) Oliver Rasmussen	Trident	20	+5.156	14	4
8	11	Alexander Smolyar	MP Motorsport	20	+5.844	15	3
9	30	(Mexico) Rafael Villagómez	Van Amersfoort Racing	20	+6.420	20	2
10	16	(Italy) Francesco Pizzi	Charouz Racing System	20	+6.614	19	1
11	20	(Spain) David Vidales	Campos Racing	20	+6.990	28	
12	6	(United Kingdom) Oliver Bearman	Prema Racing	20	+7.185	11	
13	4	(Monaco) Arthur Leclerc	Prema Racing	20	+7.663	21	
14	27	(Spain) Brad Benavides	Carlin	20	+9.341	23	
15	25	(Finland) William Alatalo	Jenzer Motorsport	20	+10.261	18	
16	17	(United States) Kaylen Frederick	Hitech Grand Prix	20	+10.500^{2}	13	
17	21	(United States) Hunter Yeany	Campos Racing	20	+10.901	16	
18	15	(Germany) David Schumacher	Charouz Racing System	20	+11.372	27	
19	14	(Hungary) László Tóth	Charouz Racing System	20	+13.988	26	
20	12	(India) Kush Maini	MP Motorsport	20	+15.008	3	
21	19	(Malaysia) Nazim Azman	Hitech Grand Prix	20	+16.253	17	
22	28	(Italy) Enzo Trulli	Carlin	20	+20.913^{3}	29	
23	23	(Israel) Ido Cohen	Jenzer Motorsport	20	+21.137^{1}	2	
Ret	10	(Brazil) Caio Collet	MP Motorsport	19	Collision	4	
Ret	8	(Switzerland) Grégoire Saucy	ART Grand Prix	16	Puncture damage	7	
Ret	24	(Italy) Federico Malvestiti	Jenzer Motorsport	12	Collision	25	
Ret	31	(United Kingdom) Reece Ushijima	Van Amersfoort Racing	12	Collision	22	
Ret	26	(United Kingdom) Zak O'Sullivan	Carlin	7	Accident	8	
Ret	22	(Spain) Pepe Martí	Campos Racing	7	Accident	24	
Fastest lap set by (United Kingdom) Oliver Bearman: 1:33.573 (lap 5)

Notes:

- ^1 – Ido Cohen originally finished 22nd, but received a five-second time penalty for exceeding track limits.
- ^2 – Kaylen Frederick originally finished eighth, but was later given a five-second time penalty for causing a collision with Ido Cohen.
- ^3 – Enzo Trulli originally finished 21st, but was later given a five-second time penalty for overtaking Ido Cohen under yellow flag conditions.

=== Feature Race ===
Pos.	No.	Driver	Team	Laps	Time/Gap	Grid	Pts.
1	2	(Czech Republic) Roman Staněk	Trident	24	45:37.829	2	25 (1)
2	5	(United States) Jak Crawford	Prema Racing	24	+0.654	3	18
3	18	(France) Isack Hadjar	Hitech Grand Prix	24	+4.247	7	15
4	4	(Monaco) Arthur Leclerc	Prema Racing	24	+6.515	21	12
5	12	(India) Kush Maini	MP Motorsport	24	+12.566	10	10
6	26	(United Kingdom) Zak O'Sullivan	Carlin	24	+13.285	8	8
7	17	(United States) Kaylen Frederick	Hitech Grand Prix	24	+14.289	13	6
8	20	(Spain) David Vidales	Campos Racing	24	+14.945	27	4
9	7	(France) Victor Martins	ART Grand Prix	24	+15.893	6	2
10	25	(Finland) William Alatalo	Jenzer Motorsport	24	+16.613	18	1
11	10	(Brazil) Caio Collet	MP Motorsport	24	+18.587	21	
12	15	(Germany) David Schumacher	Charouz Racing System	24	+18.848	29	
13	23	(Israel) Ido Cohen	Jenzer Motorsport	24	+20.446^{4}	11	
14	11	Alexander Smolyar	MP Motorsport	24	+21.050	15	
15	22	(Spain) Pepe Martí	Campos Racing	24	+21.969	24	
16	21	(United States) Hunter Yeany	Campos Racing	24	+22.963	16	
17	6	(United Kingdom) Oliver Bearman	Prema Racing	24	+24.728^{5}	5	
18	31	(United Kingdom) Reece Ushijima	Van Amersfoort Racing	24	+27.704	22	
19	19	(Malaysia) Nazim Azman	Hitech Grand Prix	24	+28.761	17	
20	30	(Mexico) Rafael Villagómez	Van Amersfoort Racing	24	+30.406	20	
21	24	(Italy) Federico Malvestiti	Jenzer Motorsport	24	+32.374	25	
22	29	(Argentina) Franco Colapinto	Van Amersfoort Racing	24	+1:12.566	12	
23†	8	(Switzerland) Grégoire Saucy	ART Grand Prix	23	Collision damage	4	
24	28	(Italy) Enzo Trulli	Carlin	23	+1 lap	28	
25	14	(Hungary) László Tóth	Charouz Racing System	21	+3 laps	26	
Ret	3	(Barbados) Zane Maloney	Trident	9	Spun off	1	(2)
Ret	27	(Spain) Brad Benavides	Carlin	6	Accident	23	
Ret	1	(Denmark) Oliver Rasmussen	Trident	5	Suspension Failure	14	
Ret	16	(Italy) Francesco Pizzi	Campos Racing	1	Spun off	19	
Fastest lap set by (Czech Republic) Roman Staněk: 1:33.129 (lap 18)

Notes:

- ^4 – Ido Cohen originally finished tenth, but was later given a five-second time penalty for repeatedly exceeding track limits at turn 9.
- ^5 – Oliver Bearman originally finished fourth, but was later given a 20-second time penalty for causing a collision with Grégoire Saucy.

== Standings after the event ==
Drivers' Championship standings

	Pos.	Driver	Points
	1	(France) Victor Martins	36
	2	(Monaco) Arthur Leclerc	36
27	3	(Czech Republic) Roman Staněk	33
6	4	(United States) Jak Crawford	32
2	5	(France) Isack Hadjar	31

Teams' Championship standings

	Pos.	Team	Points
1	1	(Italy) Prema Racing	85
1	2	(France) ART Grand Prix	65
3	3	(Italy) Trident	52
1	4	(United Kingdom) Hitech Grand Prix	41
1	5	(Netherlands) MP Motorsport	25

- Note: Only the top five positions are included for both sets of standings.

== See also ==
- 2022 Emilia Romagna Grand Prix
- 2022 Imola Formula 2 round

== Notes ==
Previous round: 2022 Sakhir Formula 3 round	FIA Formula 3 Championship; 2022 season	Next round: 2022 Barcelona Formula 3 round
Previous round: none	Imola Formula 3 round	Next round: 2024 Imola Formula 3 round (2023 Imola Formula 3 round cancelled)
