= 2022 Barcelona Formula 3 round =

Motor racing competition

(Spain) 2022 Barcelona Formula 3 round
Round details
- Round 3 of 9 in the 2022 FIA Formula 3 Championship.
- Location: Circuit de Barcelona-Catalunya, Montmeló, Catalonia, Spain
- Course: Permanent racing facility 4.909 km (3.050 mi)

Sprint Race
- Date: 21 May 2022
- Laps: 20
Podium
First	(Spain) David Vidales	Campos Racing
Second	(United States) Jak Crawford	Prema Racing
Third	(Brazil) Caio Collet	MP Motorsport
Fastest lap
Driver	(United States) Jak Crawford	Prema Racing
- Time: 1:36.788 (on lap 5)

Feature Race
- Date: 22 May 2022
- Laps: 24
Pole position
Driver	(Czech Republic) Roman Staněk	Trident
Time	1:33.516	
Podium
First	(France) Victor Martins	ART Grand Prix
Second	(Czech Republic) Roman Staněk	Trident
Third	(France) Isack Hadjar	Hitech Grand Prix
Fastest lap
Driver	(France) Victor Martins	
- Time: 1:37.030 (on lap 15)

The 2022 Barcelona Formula 3 round was a motor racing event held on 21 and 22 May 2022 at the Circuit de Barcelona-Catalunya, Montmeló, Catalonia, Spain. It was the third round of the 2022 FIA Formula 3 Championship, and was held in support of the 2022 Spanish Grand Prix.

== Classification ==
=== Qualifying ===
Trident driver Roman Staněk achieved his maiden pole position in Formula 3 ahead of championship leader Victor Martins and Alexander Smolyar.

Pos.	No.	Driver	Team	Time/Gap	Grid
1	2	(Czech Republic) Roman Staněk	Trident	1:33.516	1
2	7	(France) Victor Martins	ART Grand Prix	+0.052	2
3	11	Alexander Smolyar	MP Motorsport	+0.097	3
4	18	(France) Isack Hadjar	Hitech Grand Prix	+0.210	4
5	4	(Monaco) Arthur Leclerc	Prema Racing	+0.215	5
6	6	(United Kingdom) Oliver Bearman	Prema Racing	+0.231	6
7	10	(Brazil) Caio Collet	MP Motorsport	+0.234	7
8	17	(United States) Kaylen Frederick	Hitech Grand Prix	+0.289	8
9	5	(United States) Jak Crawford	Prema Racing	+0.309	9
10	9	(United States) Juan Manuel Correa	ART Grand Prix	+0.341	10
11	20	(Spain) David Vidales	Campos Racing	+0.357	11
12	3	(Barbados) Zane Maloney	Trident	+0.410	PL^{1}
13	29	(Argentina) Franco Colapinto	Van Amersfoort Racing	+0.447	12
14	8	(Switzerland) Grégoire Saucy	ART Grand Prix	+0.524	13
15	1	(Denmark) Oliver Rasmussen	Trident	+0.525	14
16	22	(Spain) Pepe Martí	Campos Racing	+0.601	15
17	31	(United Kingdom) Reece Ushijima (Note: Ushijima is a Japanese-American driver competing under a British licence.)	Van Amersfoort Racing	+0.664	16
18	30	(Mexico) Rafael Villagómez	Van Amersfoort Racing	+0.801	17
19	26	(United Kingdom) Zak O'Sullivan	Carlin	+0.804	18
20	21	(United States) Hunter Yeany	Campos Racing	+0.826	19
21	25	(Finland) William Alatalo	Jenzer Motorsport	+1.052	20
22	15	(Germany) Lirim Zendeli	Charouz Racing System	+1.170	21
23	12	(India) Kush Maini	MP Motorsport	+1.219	22
24	19	(Malaysia) Nazim Azman	Hitech Grand Prix	+1.279	23
25	23	(Israel) Ido Cohen	Jenzer Motorsport	+1.350	24
26	28	(Italy) Enzo Trulli	Carlin	+1.457	25
27	24	(Italy) Federico Malvestiti	Jenzer Motorsport	+1.580	26
28	27	(Spain) Brad Benavides (Note: Benavides is an American-Spanish-Guatemalan driver competing under a Spanish licence.)	Carlin	+1.821	27
29	16	(Italy) Francesco Pizzi	Charouz Racing System	+2.033	28
30	14	(Hungary) László Tóth	Charouz Racing System	+2.059	29
107% time: 1:40.062

Notes:

- ^1 – Zane Maloney originally qualified in twelfth place, but was forced to start from the pitlane in both races due to missing the weighbridge during the first half of qualifying.

=== Sprint Race ===
Pos.	No.	Driver	Team	Laps	Time/Gap	Grid	Pts.
1	20	(Spain) David Vidales	Campos Racing	20	32:38.784	1	10
2	5	(United States) Jak Crawford	Prema Racing	20	+1.268	3	9 (1)
3	10	(Brazil) Caio Collet	MP Motorsport	20	+6.482	5	8
4	4	(Monaco) Arthur Leclerc	Prema Racing	20	+9.081	7	7
5	9	(United States) Juan Manuel Correa	ART Grand Prix	20	+10.326	2	6
6	11	Alexander Smolyar	MP Motorsport	20	+11.239	9	5
7	17	(United States) Kaylen Frederick	Hitech Grand Prix	20	+11.839	4	4
8	2	(Czech Republic) Roman Staněk	Trident	20	+12.370	11	3
9	31	(United Kingdom) Reece Ushijima	Van Amersfoort Racing	20	+15.274	16	2
10	18	(France) Isack Hadjar	Hitech Grand Prix	20	+16.057	8	1
11	8	(Switzerland) Grégoire Saucy	ART Grand Prix	20	+16.908	13	
12	6	(United Kingdom) Oliver Bearman	Prema Racing	20	+17.427	6	
13	22	(Spain) Pepe Martí	Campos Racing	20	+18.137	15	
14	30	(Mexico) Rafael Villagómez	Van Amersfoort Racing	20	+19.983	17	
15	25	(Finland) William Alatalo	Jenzer Motorsport	20	+23.465	20	
16	1	(Denmark) Oliver Rasmussen	Trident	20	+24.284	14	
17	12	(India) Kush Maini	MP Motorsport	20	+24.858	22	
18	26	(United Kingdom) Zak O'Sullivan	Carlin	20	+25.438	18	
19	24	(Italy) Federico Malvestiti	Jenzer Motorsport	20	+29.713	26	
20	15	(Germany) Lirim Zendeli	Charouz Racing System	20	+32.164	21	
21	3	(Barbados) Zane Maloney	Trident	20	+35.784	PL	
22	28	(Italy) Enzo Trulli	Carlin	20	+36.292	25	
23	23	(Israel) Ido Cohen	Jenzer Motorsport	20	+39.535	24	
24	16	(Italy) Francesco Pizzi	Charouz Racing System	20	+39.941	28	
25	27	(Spain) Brad Benavides	Carlin	20	+41.105	27	
26	14	(Hungary) László Tóth	Charouz Racing System	20	+42.196	29	
27	21	(United States) Hunter Yeany	Campos Racing	20	+1:08.603	19	
Ret	19	(Malaysia) Nazim Azman	Hitech Grand Prix	16	Retired	23	
Ret	29	(Argentina) Franco Colapinto	Van Amersfoort Racing	10	Retired	12	
Ret	7	(France) Victor Martins	ART Grand Prix	7	Mechanical	10	
Fastest lap set by (United States) Jak Crawford: 1:36.788 (lap 5)

=== Feature race ===
Pos.	No.	Driver	Team	Laps	Time/Gap	Grid	Pts.
1	7	(France) Victor Martins	ART Grand Prix	24	43:43.673	2	25 (1)
2	2	(Czech Republic) Roman Staněk	Trident	24	+2.368	1	18 (2)
3	18	(France) Isack Hadjar	Hitech Grand Prix	24	+3.026	4	15
4	11	Alexander Smolyar	MP Motorsport	24	+3.624	3	12
5	6	(United Kingdom) Oliver Bearman	Prema Racing	24	+4.348	6	10
6	5	(United States) Jak Crawford	Prema Racing	24	+5.420	9	8
7	10	(Brazil) Caio Collet	MP Motorsport	24	+6.633	7	6
8	29	(Argentina) Franco Colapinto	Van Amersfoort Racing	24	+6.899	12	4
9	17	(United States) Kaylen Frederick	Hitech Grand Prix	24	+8.431	8	2
10	9	(United States) Juan Manuel Correa	ART Grand Prix	24	+12.094	10	1
11	8	(Switzerland) Grégoire Saucy	ART Grand Prix	24	+14.186	13	
12	25	(Finland) William Alatalo	Jenzer Motorsport	24	+15.236	20	
13	3	(Barbados) Zane Maloney	Trident	24	+17.510	PL	
14	1	(Denmark) Oliver Rasmussen	Trident	24	+18.747	14	
15	15	(Germany) Lirim Zendeli	Charouz Racing System	24	+21.287	21	
16	4	(Monaco) Arthur Leclerc	Prema Racing	24	+23.398^{2}	5	
17	16	(Italy) Francesco Pizzi	Charouz Racing System	24	+26.651	28	
18	19	(Malaysia) Nazim Azman	Hitech Grand Prix	24	+27.867	23	
19	31	(United Kingdom) Reece Ushijima	Van Amersfoort Racing	24	+28.281	16	
20	22	(Spain) Pepe Martí	Campos Racing	24	+28.482	15	
21	24	(Italy) Federico Malvestiti	Jenzer Motorsport	24	+29.713	26	
22	23	(Israel) Ido Cohen	Jenzer Motorsport	24	+31.079^{3}	24	
23	14	(Hungary) László Tóth	Charouz Racing System	24	+31.123	29	
24	28	(Italy) Enzo Trulli	Carlin	24	+34.906^{4}	25	
25	12	(India) Kush Maini	MP Motorsport	24	+54.804	22	
26	21	(United States) Hunter Yeany	Campos Racing	24	+1:25.486	19	
27†	26	(United Kingdom) Zak O'Sullivan	Carlin	22	+2 laps	18	
Ret	20	(Spain) David Vidales	Campos Racing	15	Collision damage	11	
Ret	27	(Spain) Brad Benavides	Carlin	10	Accident	27	
Ret	30	(Mexico) Rafael Villagómez	Van Amersfoort Racing	2	Accident	17	
Fastest lap set by (France) Victor Martins: 1:37.030 (lap 15)

Notes:

- ^2 – Arthur Leclerc originally finished eleventh, but was given a total of ten-second-time penalties for both causing a collision with David Vidales and due to erratic driving while battling against Juan Manuel Correa.
- ^3 – Ido Cohen received a five-second-time penalty for causing a collision with Kush Maini.
- ^4 – Enzo Trulli received a five-second-time penalty for causing a collision with Brad Benavides.

== Standings after the event ==
Drivers' Championship standings

	Pos.	Driver	Points
	1	(France) Victor Martins	62
1	2	(Czech Republic) Roman Staněk	56
1	3	(United States) Jak Crawford	50
1	4	(France) Isack Hadjar	47
3	5	(Monaco) Arthur Leclerc	43

Teams' Championship standings

Pos.	Team	Points
1	(Italy) Prema Racing	120
2	(France) ART Grand Prix	98
3	(Italy) Trident	75
4	(United Kingdom) Hitech Grand Prix	63
5	(Netherlands) MP Motorsport	56

- Note: Only the top five positions are included for both sets of standings.

== See also ==
- 2022 Spanish Grand Prix
- 2022 Barcelona Formula 2 round

== Notes ==
Previous round: 2022 Imola Formula 3 round	FIA Formula 3 Championship; 2022 season	Next round: 2022 Silverstone Formula 3 round
Previous round: 2021 Barcelona Formula 3 round	Barcelona Formula 3 round	Next round: 2023 Barcelona Formula 3 round
