= Nazim Azman =

Malaysian racing driver (born 2001)

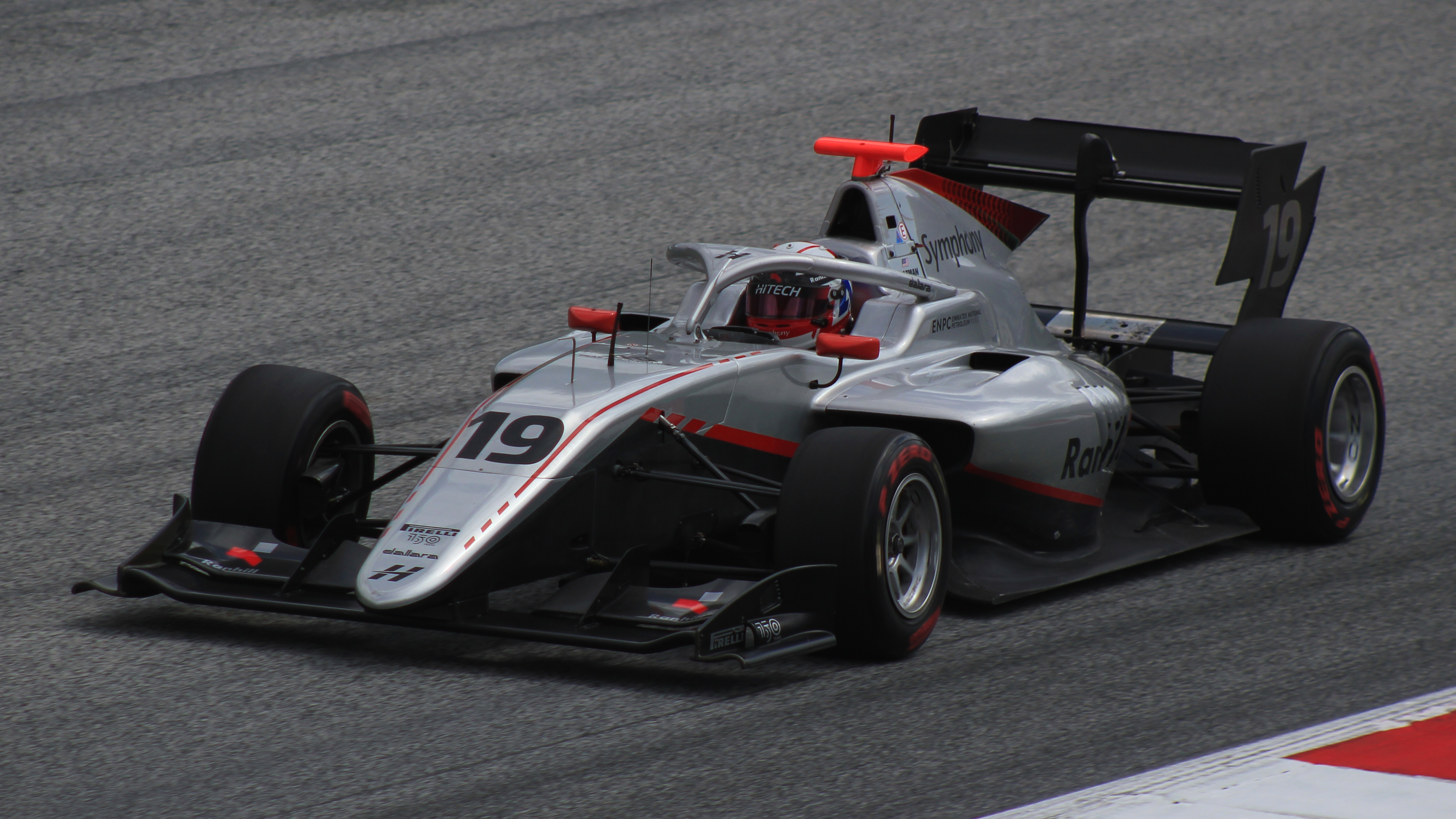
- Azman driving the Dallara F3 2019 during the 2022 Spielberg Formula 3 round.
- Nationality: (Malaysia) Malaysian
- Born: 17 August 2001 (age 25) Kuala Lumpur, Malaysia

Porsche Carrera Cup Asia career
- Debut season: 2023
- Current team: Sime Motors Racing
- Categorisation: FIA Silver
- Car number: 17
- Former teams: Sime Darby Racing Team
- Starts: 31
- Wins: 0
- Podiums: 1
- Poles: 0
- Fastest laps: 0
- Best finish: 6th in 2023

Previous series
- 2022 2021 2019–2020 2018 2017–2018 2017–18 2016–2018 2017 2017: FIA Formula 3 Championship; Euroformula Open Championship; BRDC Formula 3 Championship; Italian F4 Championship; F4 Spanish Championship; MRF Challenge; Formula 4 SEA Championship; SMP F4 Championship; Formula Masters Asian Series

Nazim Azman (born 17 August 2001) is a Malaysian racing driver who competed in the 2024 Porsche Carrera Cup Asia for Sime Darby Racing Team. He previously competed in the FIA Formula 3 Championship with Hitech Grand Prix. He is a race winner in BRDC Formula 3 and the Euroformula Open Championship.

== Junior career ==
=== Karting career ===
Azman began karting competitively in 2012. That year, he won the Rotax Max Challenge Malaysia in the MicroMax category and would finish third in the Rotax Max Challenge Asia. He moved into European competitions in 2013, achieving a third-place finish in the ROK Cup International Final in Italy, beating the likes of future Indy Lights driver Antonio Serravalle. Azman raced in karts until 2015.

=== Formula 4 ===
==== 2016 ====
Azman began single-seaters in 2016, competing in two rounds during the 2016-17 Formula 4 South East Asia Championship as a guest driver.

==== 2017 ====
For his main 2017 campaign, he competed in the F4 Spanish Championship with MP Motorsport from round 2 onwards. He took a high finish of fifth place twice and ended 11th in the standings. He also raced with MP during the final round of the SMP F4 Championship. His other one-off 2017 campaigns included the Formula Masters China and the Blancpain GT Series Asia.

During late September, Azman participated in the 2017-18 MRF Challenge Formula 2000 Championship, and ended 13th. He also participated in three rounds during the 2017-18 Formula 4 South East Asia Championship, taking his first two single-seater wins on his way to fourth in the overall standings.

==== 2018 ====
For 2018, Jenzer Motorsport signed Azman to compete in the 2018 Italian F4 Championship. He scored six points finishes, achieving a high of seventh for 17th in the overall classification. He also had another full-time campaign in the F4 Spanish Championship, driving for Drivex School. After scoring two third places during the opening round, he switched to MP Motorsport, and two more podiums saw him took the championship lead following the conclusion of the second weekend. Azman scored four more podiums for the rest of the year and wounded up fourth in the standings.

=== BRDC British Formula 3 ===
In 2019, Azman moved to the BRDC British F3 championship with Chris Dittmann Racing. He had a slow first half of the season, but took his first win during the third round at Brands Hatch. Azman took another win during the final round, placing 11th overall.

==== 2020 ====
Azman remained in BRDC Formula 3 in 2020 but switched to Carlin alongside American racing driver Kaylen Frederick and Brazilian Guilherme Peixoto. He began the season with two wins in three races, before taking his first win during the third round at Brands Hatch. Towards the end of the season, Azman scored another win. Other than his two wins, Azman scored six more podiums and ended the standings in fifth position overall.

=== Euroformula Open Championship ===
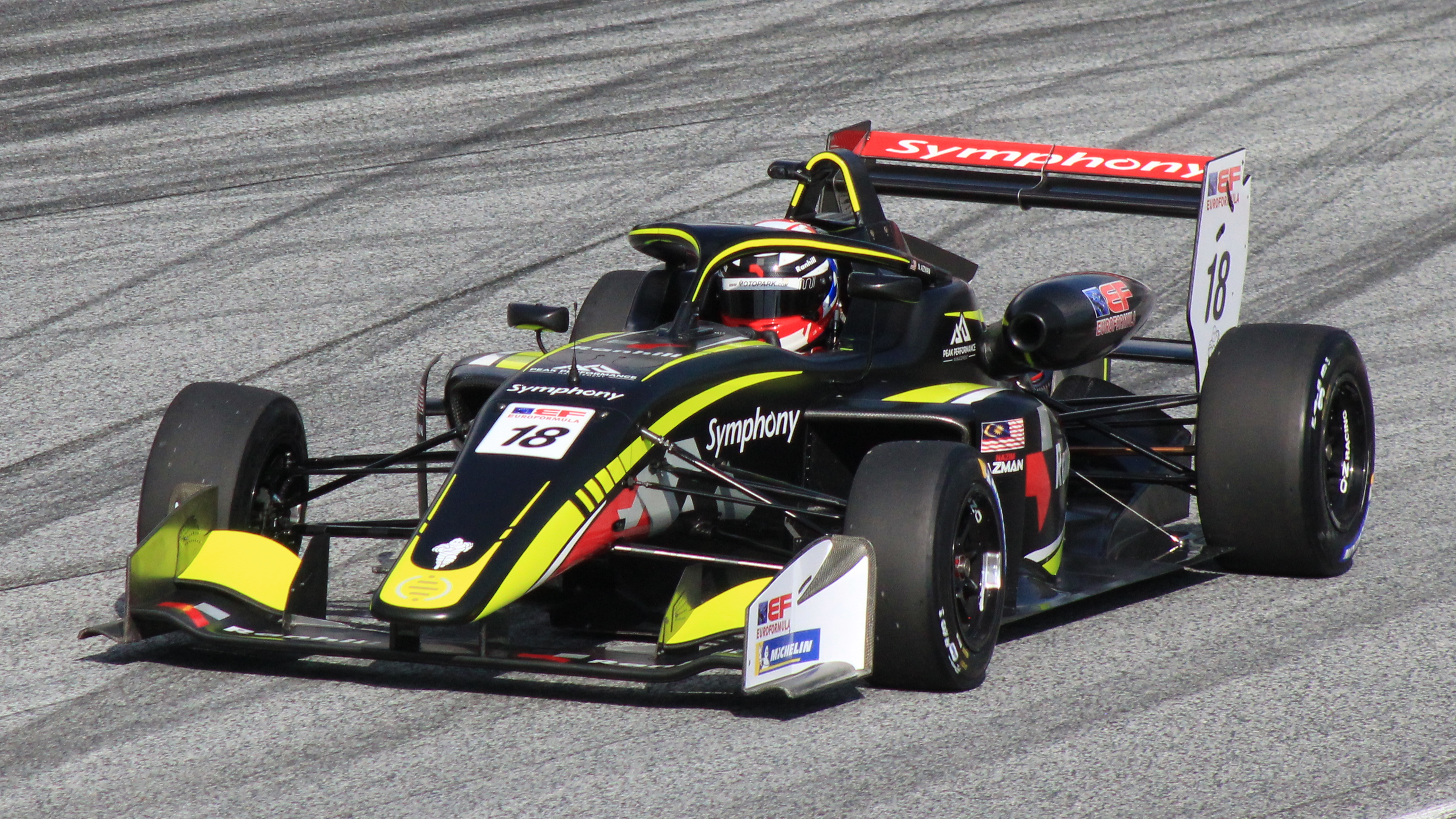
Azman during the 2021 Euroformula Open at the Red Bull Ring

In 2021, Azman moved into the Euroformula Open Championship, partnering former British F3 rival Louis Foster and Filip Kaminiarz at CryptoTower Racing. He started his season in positive fashion, scoring his first podium in the series with a second-placed finish in the second race at the Algarve International Circuit. At the third round at Spa-Francorchamps, Azman would have his best weekend of the season, finishing on the rostrum in all three races of the event, and the Malaysian followed that up by scoring another pair of podiums in the following round. Two rounds later at the Hungaroring, Azman would claim his only win and last podium of the series. He continued to take good points and eventually ended fourth in the standings.

=== FIA Formula 3 Championship ===
Azman partook in the post-season test of the FIA Formula 3 Championship in Valencia, driving for Swiss outfit Jenzer Motorsport and Charouz Racing System. Just before the pre-season test in Bahrain, Azman announced that he would join Hitech Grand Prix for the 2022 campaign, partnering with Red Bull Junior Team member Isack Hadjar and 2020 British Formula 3 champion Kaylen Frederick. In doing so, Azman became the first Malaysian driver to participate in the FIA Formula 3 Championship. Azman would be outpaced by Hadjar and Frederick throughout the season, and even had tough moments such as being in a collision with Rafael Villagómez in Silverstone. Azman ended the season with no points in 32nd, having had a best finish of 16th thrice.

== Endurance racing career ==
=== 2023 season ===
Azman left Formula 3 at the end of 2022 and moved to endurance racing for 2023. He first partook in the Sepang 12 Hours in March, in which he placed third overall alongside Reid Harker and Adrian D'Silva. He also competed in the 2023 Porsche Carrera Asia with Sime Darby Racing Team. Azman finished sixth in the standings, having amassed one podium in Sepang.

=== 2024 season ===
In 2024, Azman continued in the Porsche Carrera Cup Asia with Sime Darby Racing Team.

== Personal life ==
Azman grew up in Kuala Lumpur, Malaysia, but during his racing career he has been living in London.

== Karting record ==
=== Karting career summary ===
Season	Series	Team	Position
2012	Rotax Max Challenge Malaysia — MicroMax		1st
2012	Rotax Max Challenge Asia — MicroMax		3rd
2013	WSK Euro Series — 60 Mini	Gamoto Racing	16th
2013	WSK Master Series — 60 Mini	Gamoto Racing	62nd*
2013	ROK Cup International Final — Mini ROK	Gamoto Racing	3rd
2013	Italian Karting Championship — 60 Mini	Gamoto Racing	74th*
2013	WSK Final Cup — 60 Mini	Gamoto Racing	13th
2014	Rotax Euro Challenge — Rotax Junior		47th*
2015	Rotax Euro Challenge — Rotax Junior		NC
2019	SIC X30 National Karting Series – Senior	I.S Racing	3rd
2019	IAME Series Asia – Senior	I.S Racing	38th
Sources:

- * Azman entered for selected races only

== Racing record ==
=== Racing career summary ===
Season	Series	Team	Races	Wins	Poles	F/Laps	Podiums	Points	Position
2016–17	Formula 4 SEA Championship	Meritus.GP	6	0	0	0	1	0	NC†
2017	F4 Spanish Championship	MP Motorsport	17	0	0	0	0	33	11th
2017	SMP F4 Championship	MP Motorsport	3	0	0	0	0	2	23rd
2017	Formula Masters China	Eurasia Racing	3	0	0	0	0	4	15th
2017	Blancpain GT Series Asia - GT4	EKS Motorsports	2	0	0	0	0	0	NC†
2017–18	MRF Challenge Formula 2000 Championship	MRF Racing	16	0	0	0	0	27	13th
2017–18	Formula 4 SEA Championship	Meritus.GP	16	2	0	3	7	202	4th
2018	Italian F4 Championship	Jenzer Motorsport	20	0	0	0	0	17	17th
2018	F4 Spanish Championship	Drivex School	3	0	0	0	2	183	4th
2018	F4 Spanish Championship	MP Motorsport	14	0	0	0	6	183	4th
2019	BRDC British Formula 3 Championship	Chris Dittmann Racing	24	2	0	0	2	236	11th
2020	BRDC British Formula 3 Championship	Carlin	24	2	0	0	8	370	5th
2021	Euroformula Open Championship	CryptoTower Racing	24	1	0	0	7	270	4th
2022	FIA Formula 3 Championship	Hitech Grand Prix	18	0	0	0	0	0	32nd
2023	Porsche Carrera Cup Asia	Sime Darby Racing Team	12	0	0	0	1	130	6th
2024	Porsche Carrera Cup Asia	Sime Darby Racing Team	16	0	0	0	0	150	7th
2025	Porsche Carrera Cup Asia	Sime Motors Racing	3	0	0	0	0	0	NC†
2025	Lamborghini Super Trofeo Asia - Pro	DW Evans GT	10	0	0	0	4	88	7th
2025	GT World Challenge Asia	Absolute Racing	2	0	0	0	0	0	NC
2026	TSS The Super Series - GT4	Toyota Gazoo Racing Malaysia							
2026	Porsche Carrera Cup Asia	Origine Motorsport	3	0	0	0	1	0	NC†

^{†} As Azman was a guest driver, he was ineligible to score points notwithstanding finishing first in the GT4 category.
* Season still in progress.

=== Complete Formula 4 South East Asia Championship results ===
(key) (Races in bold indicate pole position) (Races in italics indicate fastest lap)

Year	1	2	3	4	5	6	7	8	9	10	11	12	13	14	15	16	17	18	19	20	21	22	23	24	25	26	27	28	29	30	31	32	33	34	35	36	Pos	Points
2016–17	SEP1; 1; 4	SEP1; 2 Ret	SEP1; 3; 5	SEP1; 4; 7	SEP1; 5; 3	SEP1; 6; 5	CLA; 1	CLA; 2	CLA; 3	CLA; 4	CLA; 5	SEN; 1	SEN; 2	SEN; 3	SEN; 4	SEN; 5	SEN; 6	SEP2; 1	SEP2; 2	SEP2; 3	SEP2; 4	SEP2; 5	SEP2; 6	CHA; 1	CHA; 2	CHA; 3	CHA; 4	CHA; 5	CHA; 6	CHA; 7	SEP3; 1	SEP3; 2	SEP3; 3	SEP3; 4	SEP3; 5	SEP3; 6	NC†	0
2017–18	SEP1; 1; 5	SEP1; 2; 4	SEP1; 3; 6	SEP1; 4; 3	SEP1; 5; 1	SEP1; 6 C	CLA; 1	CLA; 2	CLA; 3	CLA; 4	CLA; 5	CLA; 6	CHA; 1 Ret	CHA; 2; 4	CHA; 3; 2	CHA; 4; 3	CHA; 5; 2	CHA; 6; 1	SEP2; 1	SEP2; 2	SEP2; 3	SEP2; 4	SEP2; 5	SEP2; 6	SEP3; 1; 6	SEP3; 2; 12	SEP3; 3; 9	SEP3; 4; 6	SEP3; 5; 3	SEP3; 6; 6							4th	205

^{†} As Azman was a guest driver, he was ineligible to score points.

=== Complete Formula Masters China results ===
(key) (Races in bold indicate pole position) (Races in italics indicate fastest lap)

Year	Team	1	2	3	4	5	6	7	8	9	10	11	12	13	14	15	16	17	18	Pos	Points
2017	Eurasia Racing	SEP1; 1	SEP1; 2	SEP1; 3	SEP1; 4	SEP2; 1	SEP2; 2	SEP2; 3	SEP2; 4	ZIC1; 1	ZIC1; 2	ZIC1; 3	ZIC2; 1 Ret	ZIC2; 2; 8	ZIC2; 3; 8	SIC; 1	SIC; 2	SIC; 3	SIC; 4	15th	4

=== Complete Blancpain GT Series Asia results ===
(key) (Races in bold indicate pole position) (Races in italics indicate fastest lap)

Year	Team	1	2	3	4	5	6	7	8	9	10	11	12	Pos	Points
2017	EKS Motorsports	SEP; 1; 21	SEP; 2; 20	CHA; 1	CHA; 2	SUZ; 1	SUZ; 2	FUJ; 1	FUJ; 2	SHA; 1	SHA; 2	ZHE; 1	ZHE; 2	NC†	0

^{†} As Azman was a guest driver, he was ineligible to score points.

=== Complete SMP F4 Championship results ===
(key) (Races in bold indicate pole position) (Races in italics indicate fastest lap)

Year	Team	1	2	3	4	5	6	7	8	9	10	11	12	13	14	15	16	17	18	19	20	21	Pos	Points
2017	MP Motorsport	SOC; 1	SOC; 2	SOC; 3	SMO; 1	SMO; 2	SMO; 3	AHV; 1	AHV; 2	AHV; 3	AUD; 1	AUD; 2	AUD; 3	MSC1; 1	MSC1; 2	MSC1; 3	MSC2; 1	MSC2; 2	MSC2; 3	ASS; 1; 9	ASS; 2; 16	ASS; 3; 15	23rd	2

=== Complete F4 Spanish Championship results ===
(key) (Races in bold indicate pole position) (Races in italics indicate fastest lap)

Year	Team	1	2	3	4	5	6	7	8	9	10	11	12	13	14	15	16	17	18	19	20	Pos	Points
2017	MP Motorsport	ALC; 1	ALC; 2	ALC; 3	NAV1; 1; 5	NAV1; 2; 10	NAV1; 3; 5	CAT; 1; 9	CAT; 2; 11	JER; 1; 14	JER; 2; 11	JER; 3; 10	NAV2; 1; 8	NAV2; 2; 12	NAV2; 3; 13	NOG; 1 Ret	NOG; 2; 11	NOG; 3; 10	EST; 1; 10	EST; 2; 12	EST; 3; 7	11th	35
2018	Drivex School	ARA; 1; 3	ARA; 2; 4	ARA; 3; 3																		4th	183
2018	MP Motorsport				CRT; 1; 2	CRT; 2; 3	CRT; 3; 4	ALG; 1; 3	ALG; 2; 4	ALG; 3; 2	CAT; 1 C	CAT; 2; 3	JER; 1; 6	JER; 2; 10	JER; 3; 5	NAV; 1; 8	NAV; 2; 6	NAV; 3; 3	NAV; 4; 4			4th	183

=== Complete MRF Challenge Formula 2000 Championship results ===
(key) (Races in bold indicate pole position; races in italics indicate fastest lap)

Year	Team	1	2	3	4	5	6	7	8	9	10	11	12	13	14	15	16	DC	Points
2017–18	MRF Racing	BHR; 1; 8	BHR; 2; 11	BHR; 3 Ret	BHR; 4; 7	DUB; 1; 12	DUB; 2; 10	DUB; 3; 7	DUB; 4 Ret	YAS; 1; 12	YAS; 2; 5	YAS; 3; 13	YAS; 4; 17	CHE; 1; 15	CHE; 2; 13	CHE; 3 Ret	CHE; 4; 15	13th	27

=== Complete Italian F4 Championship results ===
(key) (Races in bold indicate pole position) (Races in italics indicate fastest lap)

Year	Team	1	2	3	4	5	6	7	8	9	10	11	12	13	14	15	16	17	18	19	20	21	Pos	Points
2018	Jenzer Motorsport	ADR; 1; 17	ADR; 2 Ret	ADR; 3; 12	LEC; 1; 15	LEC; 2; 17	LEC; 3; 15	MNZ; 1; 8	MNZ; 2; 10	MNZ; 3; 9	MIS; 1; 24	MIS; 2; 12	MIS; 3; 7	IMO; 1; 15	IMO; 2; 15	IMO; 3; 14	VLL; 1; 9	VLL; 2; 12	VLL; 3; 9	MUG; 1; 18	MUG; 2 Ret	MUG; 3; 19	17th	17

=== Complete BRDC British Formula 3 Championship results ===
(key) (Races in bold indicate pole position) (Races in italics indicate fastest lap)

Year	Team	1	2	3	4	5	6	7	8	9	10	11	12	13	14	15	16	17	18	19	20	21	22	23	24	Pos	Points
2019	Chris Dittmann Racing	OUL; 1; 7	OUL; 2; 9	OUL; 3; 11	SNE; 1; 13	SNE; 2; 5	SNE; 3; 6	SIL1; 1; 10	SIL1; 2; 6^{2}	SIL1; 3; 16	DON1; 1; 12	DON1; 2; 11	DON1; 3; 5	SPA; 1; 16	SPA; 2; 16	SPA; 3; 14	BRH; 1; 14	BRH; 2; 1^{2}	BRH; 3; 12	SIL2; 1; 15	SIL2; 2; 12	SIL2; 3; 12	DON2; 1; 14	DON2; 2; 1^{1}	DON2; 3; 11	11th	236
2020	Carlin	OUL; 1; 3	OUL; 2; 12	OUL; 3; 2	OUL; 4; 4	DON1; 1; 10	DON1; 2; 7^{2}	DON1; 3; 10	BRH; 1; 11	BRH; 2; 1^{3}	BRH; 3; 10	BRH; 4; 8	DON2; 1; 5	DON2; 2; 14	DON2; 3; 3	SNE; 1; 3	SNE; 2; 10^{1}	SNE; 3; 11	SNE; 4; 3	DON3; 1; 7	DON3; 2; 1^{1}	DON3; 3; 6	SIL; 1; 11	SIL; 2; 3^{4}	SIL; 3; 11	5th	370

=== Complete Euroformula Open Championship results ===
(key) (Races in bold indicate pole position; races in italics indicate points for the fastest lap of top ten finishers)

Year	Entrant	1	2	3	4	5	6	7	8	9	10	11	12	13	14	15	16	17	18	19	20	21	22	23	24	DC	Points
2021	CryptoTower Racing	POR; 1; 4	POR; 2; 2	POR; 3; 4	LEC; 1; 6	LEC; 2; 7	LEC; 3; 4*	SPA; 1; 2	SPA; 2; 3	SPA; 3; 3	HUN; 1; 6	HUN; 2; 2	HUN; 3; 3	IMO; 1; 11†	IMO; 2; 7	IMO; 3; 5	RBR; 1; 6	RBR; 2; 1	RBR; 3; 4	MNZ; 1; 4	MNZ; 2; 4	MNZ; 3; 8	CAT; 1; 4	CAT; 2; 7	CAT; 3; 8	4th	262

=== Complete FIA Formula 3 Championship results ===
(key) (Races in bold indicate pole position; races in italics indicate points for the fastest lap of top ten finishers)

Year	Entrant	1	2	3	4	5	6	7	8	9	10	11	12	13	14	15	16	17	18	DC	Points
2022	Hitech Grand Prix	BHR; SPR; 16	BHR; FEA; Ret	IMO; SPR; 21	IMO; FEA; 19	CAT; SPR; Ret	CAT; FEA; 18	SIL; SPR; 22	SIL; FEA; Ret	RBR; SPR; 24	RBR; FEA; 16	HUN; SPR; 23	HUN; FEA; 26	SPA; SPR; 16	SPA; FEA; 20	ZAN; SPR; 25	ZAN; FEA; 21	MNZ; SPR; 21	MNZ; FEA; 21	32nd	0

=== Complete Sepang 12 Hours results ===
Year	Team	Co-Drivers	Car	Class	Laps	Pos.	Class Pos.
2023	(Malaysia) EBM Giga Racing	(Malaysia) Adrian D'Silva (New Zealand) Reid Harker	Porsche 911 GT3 R	GT3	215	**3rd**	**3rd**

=== Complete Porsche Carrera Cup Asia results ===
(key) (Races in bold indicate pole position; races in italics indicate points for the fastest lap of top ten finishers)

Year	Entrant	Class	Chassis	1	2	3	4	5	6	7	8	9	10	11	12	13	14	15	16	DC	Points
2023	Sime Darby Racing Team	Pro	911 GT3 Cup	SEP1; 1; 5	SEP1; 2; 5	KOR; 1; 7	KOR; 2 Ret	SUZ; 1; 4	SUZ; 2; 5	CHA; 1	CHA; 2	SEP2; 1; 3	SEP2; 2; 5	MRN; 1; 5	MRN; 2; 5	SIC; 1; 7	SIC; 2; 5			6th	130
2024	Sime Darby Racing Team	Pro	911 GT3 Cup	SIC; 1; 9	SIC; 2; 8	SUZ; 1 Ret	SUZ; 2; 8	CHA; 1; 5	CHA; 2; 4	BAN; 1; 7	BAN; 2; 24	SEP; 1; 8	SEP; 2; 6	SEP; 3; 4	MRN; 1; 9	MRN; 2; 6	SIC; 1; 5	SIC; 2; 9	SIC; 3; 5	7th	150
2025	Sime Motors Racing	Pro	911 GT3 Cup	SIC; 1	SIC; 2	MOT; 1	MOT; 2	SEP; 1; 7	SEP; 2; 6	SEP; 3; 4	BAN; 1	BAN; 2	MAN; 1	MAN; 2	MAN; 3A	MRN; 1	MRN; 2			NC†	0

^{†} As Azman was a guest driver, he was ineligible to score points.

=== Complete GT World Challenge Asia results ===
(key) (Races in bold indicate pole position; races in italics indicate points for the fastest lap of top ten finishers)

Year	Entrant	Class	Chassis	1	2	3	4	5	6	7	8	9	10	11	12	DC	Points
2025	Absolute Racing	Silver	Porsche 911 GT3 R (992)	SEP; 1	SEP; 2	MAN; 1	MAN; 2	BUR; 1	BUR; 2	FUJ; 2	FUJ; 2	OKA; 1	OKA; 2	BEI; 1; 19	BEI; 2; 20	NC	0
