= Kaylen Frederick =

American racing driver

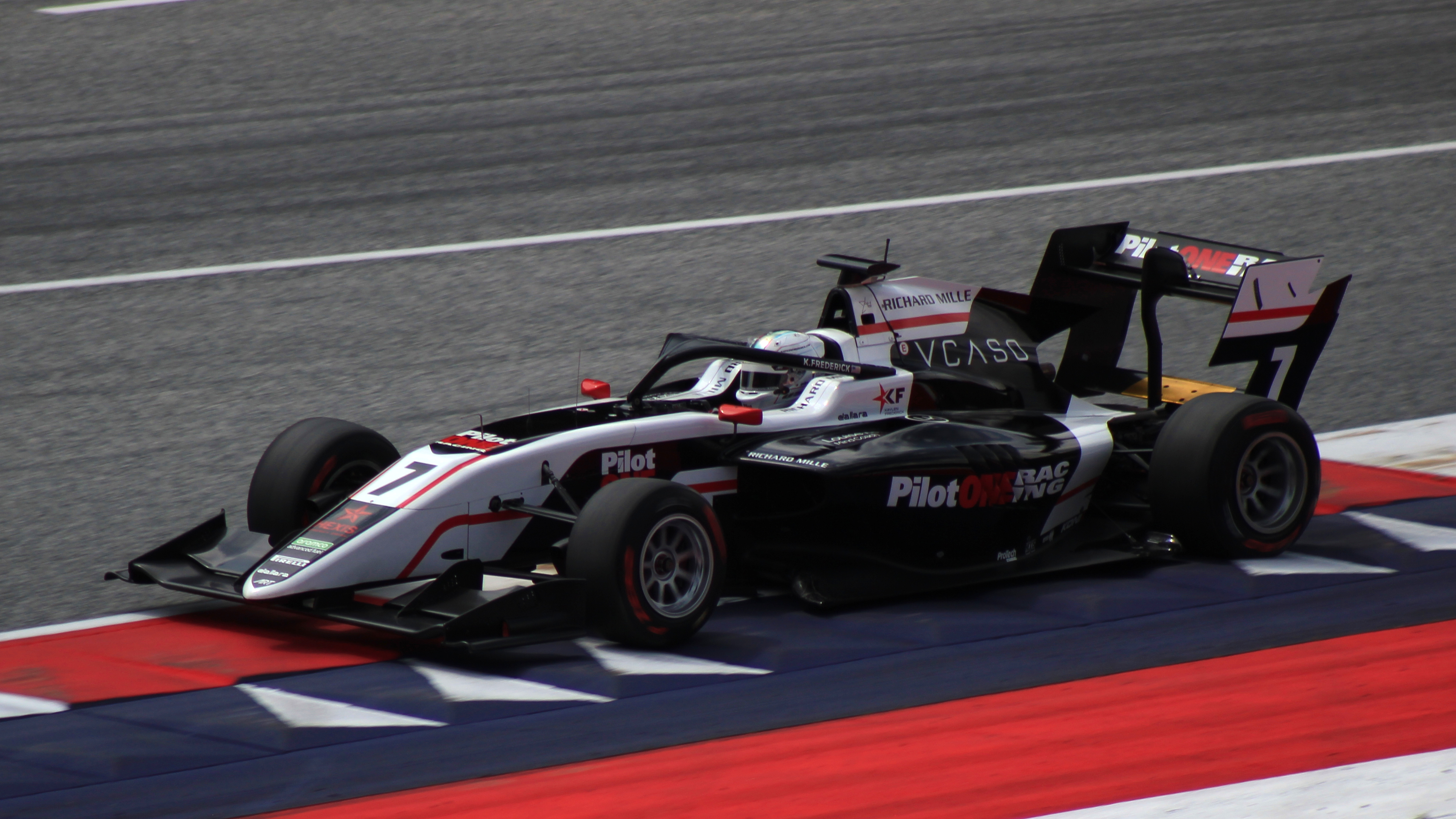
- Frederick driving for ART Grand Prix during the 2023 Spielberg Formula 3 round.
- Nationality: (United States) American
- Born: 4 June 2002 (age 24) Potomac, Maryland, United States

IMSA SportsCar Championship career
- Debut season: 2026
- Current team: JDC–Miller MotorSports
- Categorisation: FIA Gold
- Car number: 5
- Starts: 5
- Wins: 0
- Podiums: 2
- Poles: 0
- Fastest laps: 0
- Best finish: 16th in 2026

Previous series
- 2024–2025 2021–2023 2019–20 2018 2018 2017–2018 2016–2018 2016 2016: Super Formula Lights; FIA Formula 3 Championship; BRDC Formula 3 Championship; Euroformula Open Championship; Formula 4 United States Championship; SCCA Majors Championship Worldwide - Formula Atlantic; U.S. F2000 National Championship; F2000 Championship Series; F1600 Championship Series

Championship titles
- 2020: BRDC British Formula 3 Championship

Kaylen Frederick (born 4 June 2002) is an American racing driver of German descent who competes in the IMSA SportsCar Championship with JDC–Miller MotorSports. He was the last champion of the British Formula 3 Championship in 2020. He previously competed in Super Formula Lights with B-Max Racing Team.

== Early racing career ==
=== Karting career ===
Frederick began his racing career in karting at the age of seven, where he remained active until 2015.

=== Lower formulae ===
==== 2016 ====
In 2016, Frederick switched to formula racing at the age of fourteen, where he competed in the F1600 Championship Series with Team Pelfrey. Due to his age he had to miss the first six races, but was nevertheless successful by taking his first single-seater win at the Pittsburgh International Race Complex and three second-place finishes. With 474 points, he finished seventh in the championship. Later in the year, he made his U.S. F2000 debut for Pelfrey on the final race weekend at Laguna Seca, becoming the youngest driver to race in the series where he finished thirteenth in both races and ended 24th in the standings. He also drove for Pelfrey in the season finale of the F2000 Championship at Virginia International Raceway. He immediately took pole position, but finished seventh in the first race, while failing to finish the second race.

==== 2017 ====
The following year, Frederick competed full-time in U.S. F2000 with Team Pelfrey. He took his first podiums at Barber Motorsports Park, scoring a pair of second places, after being bested by Oliver Askew. Indianapolis Motor Speedway was positive with a third-place finish in the second race, although he would have achieved more without a disqualification from second place in the first race. He scored only two more third places that season at the Toronto Street Circuit and Mid-Ohio Sports Car Course. With 240 points, he finished fourth in the standings behind Oliver Askew, Rinus VeeKay and Parker Thompson, the highest driver not to win a race. He also drove an F2000 Championship Series weekend at Mid-Ohio, where he earned pole position and a podium finish.

==== 2018 ====
In 2018, Frederick took another shot at U.S. F2000 with Pabst Racing Services. He achieved all his four podium finishes consecutively, at Lucas Oil Raceway, Road America and Toronto, taking three second places and one third place. However, his season was much more inconsistent compared to the previous year, and he finished sixth in the final standings with 173 points. Frederick also drove in the first race weekend of the Formula 4 United States Championship in Virginia with the K-Hill Motorsports team, but managed only a retirement, 23rd and 12th in the races. At the end of the season, Frederick drove for the first time in Europe for two Euroformula Open race weekends with RP Motorsport. He achieved two top ten finishes in four races, with a fifth place at the Monza as his best result. With 21 points, Frederick finished fourteenth in the final standings.

=== BRDC British Formula 3 Championship ===
==== 2019 ====
In 2019, Frederick switched full-time to racing in Europe and was expected to race in the Euroformula Open, but instead competed in British Formula 3 with Carlin. He achieved his first win on his first weekend at Oulton Park during the second race. Two more third places at Snetterton and Silverstone followed, before he added a second victory at Spa-Francorchamps. He failed to make the podium for the last three rounds and ended ninth in the standings.

==== 2020 ====
Frederick remained with Carlin in BRDC F3 for 2020, partnering Guilherme Peixoto and Nazim Azman. He started his season in Oulton Park with two wins. At the first Donington Park round, Frederick once again won and also secured a second place. A blip of form followed in Brands Hatch, but the second Donington round saw the American victorious, which also applied to the next round in Snetterton Circuit. Having been nine points behind championship rival Kush Maini, Frederick's pace skyrocketed for the final two rounds, taking four victories, two each in Donington and Silverstone which allowed him to surpass Maini's points tally. Frederick secured the title during the final race, beating Maini by 51 points. Throughout the season, Frederick achieved nine wins and three more podiums.

=== FIA Formula 3 Championship ===
==== 2021 ====
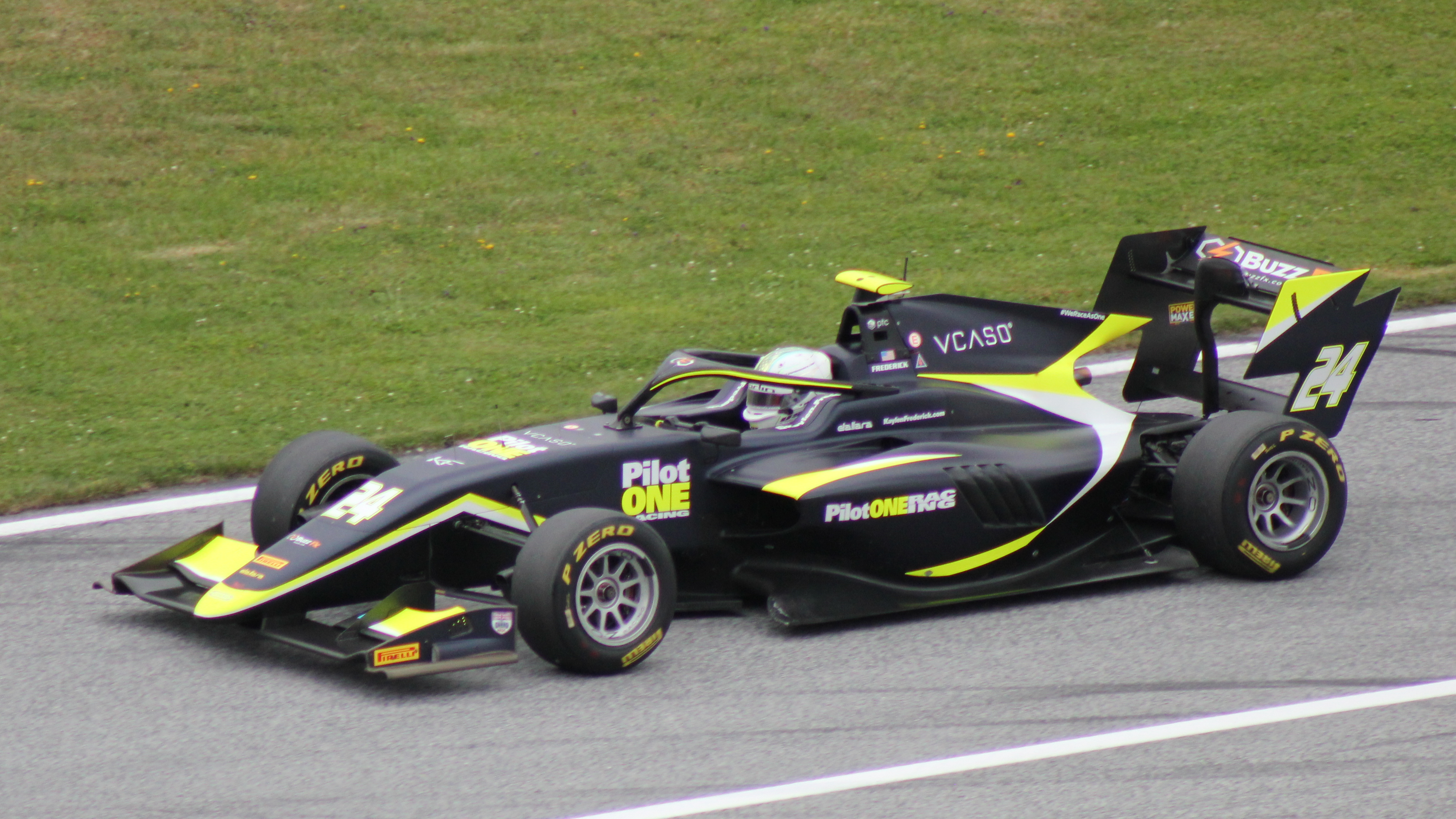
Frederick driving the Dallara F3 2019 during the 2021 Spielberg Formula 3 round.

In 2021, Frederick progressed to the FIA Formula 3 Championship. Remaining with Carlin, he was partnered by Ido Cohen and Red Bull Junior Jonny Edgar. Frederick had a solid debut in the championship, achieving a best finish of 17th twice during the first two rounds. During the Austrian round, Frederick claimed his first F3 points after multiple penalties promoted him to ninth place in race 1. Starting fourth for race 2, Frederick impressively maintained his position in the top 5. On lap 11, he made a late dive on Juan Manuel Correa which spun both around, and Frederick retired on the spot. It was later discovered that Frederick suffered a fracture dislocation in his left thumb, causing him to miss race 3. He also missed the Budapest round due to the injury and was substituted by Jake Hughes. In addition, he did not compete in Spa-Francorchamps after testing positive for COVID-19. He returned in Zandvoort, and achieved 11th place in just his second race on his return. Frederick scored two points, besting out Cohen, who scored 0 points, but got outlasted by Edgar, who scored 23 points. He then tested for Hitech Grand Prix during the post-season test.

==== 2022 ====
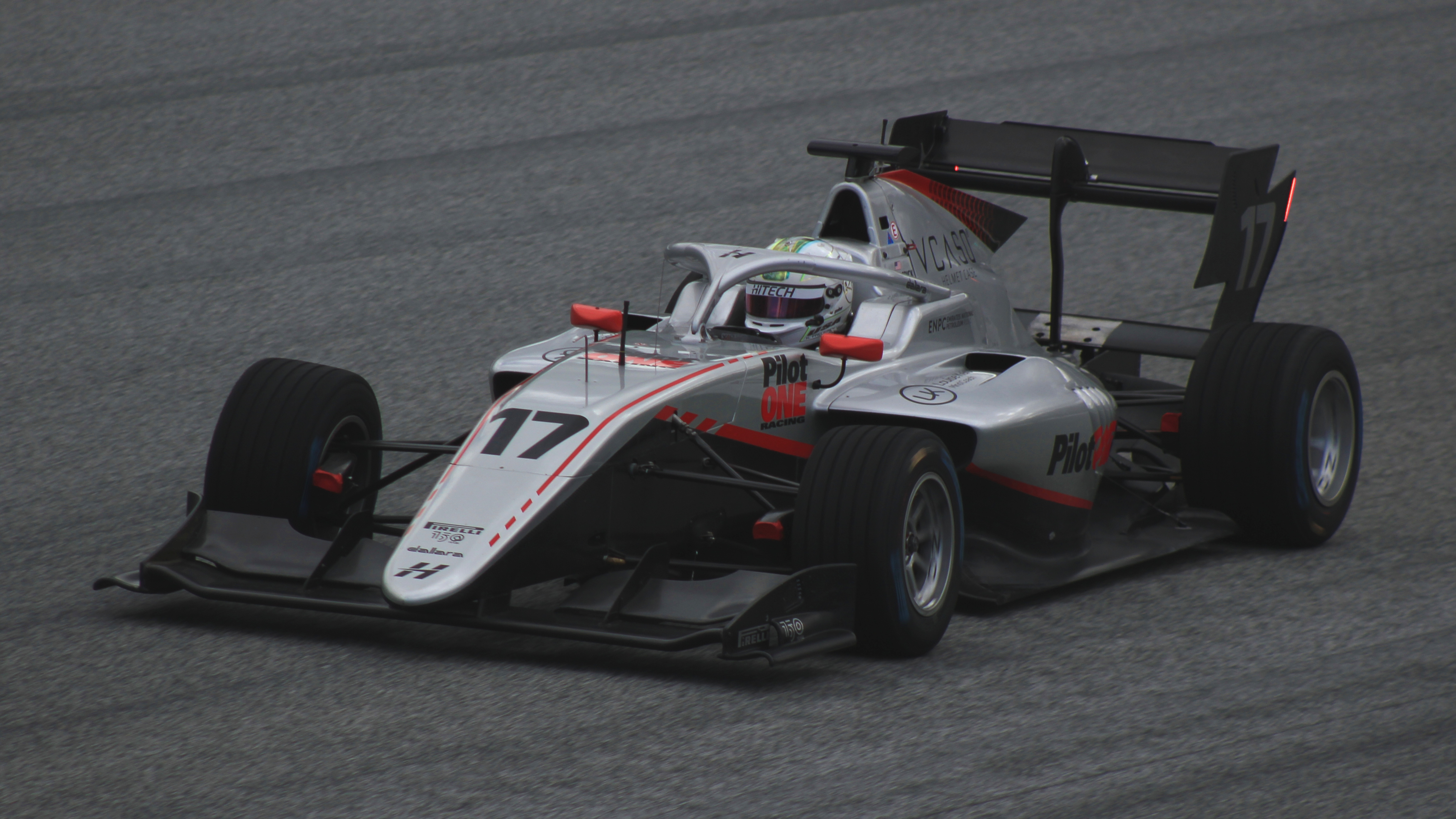
Frederick driving for Hitech Grand Prix during the 2022 Spielberg Formula 3 round.

Frederick switched to Hitech Grand Prix for 2022, partnering Isack Hadjar and former BRDC F3 teammate Nazim Azman. The American stated that he was "‘more prepared’ for F3 after his toughest year in racing". Frederick qualified in 19th during the opening Bahrain round, and during the first race, charged forward to eighth place, a performance he hailed as "really positive". In the feature race, Frederick span on the opening lap which dropped him to the back, but despite the setback, he managed to climb back into the points in tenth place. Frederick improved his best F3 finish in Imola, ending in seventh place during the feature race. In Barcelona, Frederick qualified in eighth, his best qualifying in F3 yet. He scored good points in the races, finishing seventh and ninth after battling tyre degradation. Having improved his qualifying-best position to seventh, he also improved his highest finish to fifth in the Silverstone sprint race. The feature race was less satisfying; he went over the kerbs which damaged his diffuser, and struggled on his way to finish out of the points.

In Austria, Frederick improved his qualifying position for a third straight time, securing fifth. Frederick ended in seventh position in the sprint race, which improved to sixth after Oliver Bearman was penalised ahead of him. However, that result would prove to be his last points of the season. During the feature race, Frederick fought over Roman Staněk over fifth place, in which it ended in tears for the American as he sustained a puncture following contact. Frederick's form dipped during the next three rounds, failing to even fight near the points-paying positions thanks to poor qualifying sessions. In Monza, Frederick returned to competing in the top-ten, but both races were marred with collisions that led to punctures. Frederick ended 17th in the standings with 27 points, being outscored massively by Hadjar but beating Azman. In late September, he partook in the post-season test with ART Grand Prix, driving on days 1 and 2 for the French outfit.

==== 2023 ====
Frederick moved to ART Grand Prix for his third Formula 3 season in 2023, partnering single-seater champions Grégoire Saucy and Nikola Tsolov. Frederick started his season in Bahrain with sixth in qualifying, but was set back by contact in which he sustained a puncture during the sprint race. In the feature race, he battled tyre degradation but was able to take his first points of the year with seventh. Frederick again scored a point in the Melbourne sprint race, after all three MP Motorsport cars were disqualified. The feature race was not so fortunate for him, as he crashed into teammate Tsolov under the safety car; Frederick received a ten-place grid penalty for the following race. He returned to the points for the last time at the Red Bull Ring where he finished seventh in the sprint race, but his feature race was halted due to a broken front wing sustained after fighting Mari Boya. Overall, his season was filled with lost opportunities, with incidents limiting his progress such as in Silverstone and Hungary. Frederick ended the season in a disappointing 21st place overall with 11 points, with ART Grand Prix having a tough season as well.

=== Indy NXT ===
In October 2023, Frederick tested an Indy NXT car at the Indianapolis Motor Speedway with HMD Motorsports.

=== Super Formula Lights ===
In November 2023, Frederick partook in the Super Formula Lights post-season test with B-Max Racing at Okayama International Circuit.

==== 2024 ====
Frederick would sign a deal to compete in the 2024 Super Formula Lights with B-Max Racing. The first round in Autopolis yielded a second-placed podium during the third race. He earned his first pole for the second race in Sugo but struggled for pace and eventually finished fifth. After a scoreless weekend at Fuji Speedway, Frederick drove to his first win in Okayama during the second race, whilst finishing runner-up for the other two races. After a double points finish during the last round in Motegi, Frederick placed fifth in the standings with 46 points, earning one win and four podiums.

==== 2025 ====
Frederick stayed with B-Max for 2025 season. He took his first win of the season during the second race at Autopolis, having started from pole, although he did not receive pole position points as qualifying was cancelled due to dense fog.

== Sportscar racing career ==
=== 2026 ===
Frederick made his sportscar racing debut during the 2026 24 Hours of Daytona, driving for JDC–Miller MotorSports in the GTP category.

== Personal life ==
Frederick originates from Potomac in Maryland, and his hero is four-time Formula One World champion Sebastian Vettel.

== Karting record ==
=== Karting career summary ===
Season	Series	Position
2013	Florida Winter Tour — Rotax Micro Max	38th
2013	Florida Winter Tour — Cadet	41st
2014	SKUSA Pro Tour — Cadet	8th
2014	Florida Winter Tour — Rotax Micro Max	17th
2014	Florida Winter Tour — Cadet	5th

== Racing record ==
=== Racing career summary ===
Season	Series	Team	Races	Wins	Poles	F/Laps	Podiums	Points	Position
2016	F1600 Championship Series	Team Pelfrey	15	1	2	2	4	474	7th
2016	U.S. F2000 National Championship	Team Pelfrey	2	0	0	0	0	16	24th
2016	F2000 Championship Series	Team Pelfrey	2	0	1	1	0	33	30th
2017	U.S. F2000 National Championship	Team Pelfrey	14	0	0	2	5	240	4th
2017	F2000 Championship Series	N/A	2	0	1	0	1	59	23rd
2017	SCCA Majors Championship Nationwide - Formula Atlantic	N/A	2	0	0	0	0	27	33rd
2018	U.S. F2000 National Championship	Pabst Racing Services	14	0	2	0	4	173	6th
2018	Formula 4 United States Championship	K-Hill Motorsports	3	0	0	0	0	0	34th
2018	Euroformula Open Championship	RP Motorsport	4	0	0	1	0	21	14th
2018	F2000 Championship Series	N/A	0	0	0	0	0	0	NC
2018	SCCA Majors Championship Nationwide - Formula Atlantic	N/A	2	2	0	0	2	50	18th
2019	BRDC British Formula 3 Championship	Carlin	24	2	1	3	4	305	9th
2020	BRDC British Formula 3 Championship	Carlin	24	9	8	12	12	499	**1st**
2021	FIA Formula 3 Championship	Carlin Buzz Racing	13	0	0	0	0	2	22nd
2022	FIA Formula 3 Championship	Hitech Grand Prix	18	0	0	0	0	27	17th
2023	FIA Formula 3 Championship	ART Grand Prix	18	0	0	0	0	11	21st
2024	Super Formula Lights	B-Max Racing Team	18	1	1	0	4	46	5th
2025	Super Formula Lights	B-Max Racing Team	15	1	1	1	4	35	5th
2026	IMSA SportsCar Championship - GTP	JDC–Miller MotorSports	5	0	0	0	2	1424	16th

=== American open-wheel racing results ===
==== U.S. F2000 Championship ====
Year	Team	1	2	3	4	5	6	7	8	9	10	11	12	13	14	15	16	Rank	Points
2016	Team Pelfrey	STP	STP	BAR	BAR	IMS	IMS	LOR	ROA	ROA	TOR	TOR	MOH	MOH	MOH	LAG; 13	LAG; 13	24th	16
2017	Team Pelfrey	STP; 4	STP; 5	BAR; 2	BAR; 2	IMS; DSQ	IMS; 3	ROA; 6	ROA; 4	IOW; 6	TOR; 17	TOR; 3	MOH; 7	MOH; 3	WGL; 4			4th	240
2018	Pabst Racing Services	STP; 11	STP; 9	IMS; 22	IMS; 21	LOR; 2	ROA; 2	ROA; 2	TOR; 3	**TOR**; 8	MOH; 24	**MOH**; 23	MOH; 19	POR; 7	POR; 15			6th	173

=== Complete Formula 4 United States Championship results ===
(key) (Races in bold indicate pole position) (Races in italics indicate fastest lap)

Year	Entrant	1	2	3	4	5	6	7	8	9	10	11	12	13	14	15	16	17	DC	Points
2018	K-Hill Motorsports	VIR; 1 Ret	VIR; 2; 23	VIR; 3; 12	ROA; 1	ROA; 2	ROA; 3	MOH; 1	MOH; 2	MOH; 3	PIT; 1	PIT; 2	PIT; 3	NJMP; 1	NJMP; 2	NJMP; 3	COTA; 1	COTA; 2	34th	0

=== Complete Euroformula Open Championship results ===
(key) (Races in bold indicate pole position; races in italics indicate points for the fastest lap of top ten finishers)

Year	Entrant	1	2	3	4	5	6	7	8	9	10	11	12	13	14	15	16	DC	Points
2018	RP Motorsport	EST; 1	EST; 2	LEC; 1	LEC; 2	SPA; 1	SPA; 2	HUN; 1	HUN; 2	SIL; 1	SIL; 2	MNZ; 1; 12	MNZ; 2; 5	JER; 1	JER; 2	CAT; 1; 11	CAT; 2; 9	14th	21

=== Complete BRDC British Formula 3 Championship results ===
(key) (Races in bold indicate pole position) (Races in italics indicate fastest lap)

Year	Team	1	2	3	4	5	6	7	8	9	10	11	12	13	14	15	16	17	18	19	20	21	22	23	24	Pos	Points
2019	Carlin	**OUL**; **1**; 13	OUL; 2; 1	OUL; 3; 12	SNE; 1; 7	SNE; 2; 4^{6}	SNE; 3; 3	SIL1; 1; 4	SIL1; 2; 12^{3}	SIL1; 3; 3	DON1; 1; 10	DON1; 2 Ret	DON1; 3 Ret	SPA; 1; 1	SPA; 2 Ret	SPA; 3; 16	BRH; 1; 5	BRH; 2 Ret	BRH; 3; 5	SIL2; 1; 6	SIL2; 2; 13	SIL2; 3; 10	DON2; 1; 8	DON2; 2; 8	DON2; 3; 7	9th	305
2020	Carlin	OUL; 1; 8	OUL; 2; 14^{2}	OUL; 3; 1	**OUL**; **4**; 1	**DON1**; **1**; 8	DON1; 2; 2^{9}	DON1; 3; 1	BRH; 1 NC	BRH; 2; 12^{3}	BRH; 3 Ret	BRH; 4; 11	**DON2**; **1**; 1	DON2; 2; 12^{4}	**DON2**; **3**; 4	SNE; 1; 1	SNE; 2; 12^{1}	SNE; 3; 2	SNE; 4; 2	**DON3**; **1**; 1	DON3; 2; 7^{1}	**DON3**; **3**; 1	**SIL**; **1**; 1	SIL; 2; 12^{5}	**SIL**; **3**; 1	1st	499

=== Complete FIA Formula 3 Championship results ===
(key) (Races in bold indicate pole position; races in italics indicate points for the fastest lap of top ten finishers)

Year	Entrant	1	2	3	4	5	6	7	8	9	10	11	12	13	14	15	16	17	18	19	20	21	DC	Points
2021	Carlin Buzz Racing	CAT; 1; 22	CAT; 2; 17	CAT; 3; 30	LEC; 1; 20	LEC; 2; 22	LEC; 3; 17	RBR; 1; 9	RBR; 2 Ret	RBR; 3 DNS	HUN; 1	HUN; 2	HUN; 3	SPA; 1	SPA; 2	SPA; 3	ZAN; 1; 20	ZAN; 2; 11	ZAN; 3; 21	SOC; 1; 23	SOC; 2 C	SOC; 3; 13	22nd	2
2022	Hitech Grand Prix	BHR; SPR; 8	BHR; FEA; 10	IMO; SPR; 16	IMO; FEA; 7	CAT; SPR; 7	CAT; FEA; 9	SIL; SPR; 5	SIL; FEA; 12	RBR; SPR; 6	RBR; FEA; 23	HUN; SPR; 19	HUN; FEA; 20	SPA; SPR; Ret	SPA; FEA; 16	ZAN; SPR; 15	ZAN; FEA; 13	MNZ; SPR; Ret	MNZ; FEA; 25				17th	27
2023	ART Grand Prix	BHR; SPR; 28	BHR; FEA; 7	MEL; SPR; 10	MEL; FEA; Ret	MON; SPR; 24	MON; FEA; 25	CAT; SPR; 14	CAT; FEA; 17	RBR; SPR; 7	RBR; FEA; 26	SIL; SPR; 22	SIL; FEA; 19	HUN; SPR; 12	HUN; FEA; Ret	SPA; SPR; 13	SPA; FEA; 15	MNZ; SPR; 20	MNZ; FEA; Ret				21st	11

=== Complete Super Formula Lights results ===
(key) (Races in bold indicate pole position) (Races in italics indicate fastest lap)

Year	Entrant	1	2	3	4	5	6	7	8	9	10	11	12	13	14	15	16	17	18	Pos	Points
2024	B-Max Racing Team	AUT; 1; 4	AUT; 2; 4	AUT; 3; 2	SUG; 1 Ret	**SUG**; **2**; 5	SUG; 3; 8	FUJ; 1; 8	FUJ; 2; 8	FUJ; 3; 12	OKA; 1; 2	OKA; 2; 1	OKA; 3; 2	SUZ; 1; 5	SUZ; 2; 7	SUZ; 3; 7	MOT; 1; 6	MOT; 2; 4	MOT; 3 Ret	5th	46
2025	B-Max Racing Team	SUZ; 1; 9	SUZ; 2; 3	SUZ; 3; 5	AUT; 1; 2	**AUT**; **2**; 1	OKA; 1; 4	OKA; 2; 7	OKA; 3; 3	SUG; 1; 6	SUG; 2; 7	SUG; 3; 6	SUG; 4; 10	FUJ; 1; 9	FUJ; 2; 9	FUJ; 3; 6	MOT; 1	MOT; 2	MOT; 3	5th	35

^{*} Season still in progress.

=== Complete IMSA SportsCar Championship results ===
(key) (Races in bold indicate pole position; races in italics indicate fastest lap)

Year	Entrant	Class	Chassis	Engine	1	2	3	4	5	6	7	8	9	Rank	Points
2026	JDC–Miller MotorSports	GTP	Porsche 963	Porsche 9RD 4.6 L Turbo V8	DAY; 7	SEB; 8	LBH	LGA	DET	WGL; 3	ELK; 2	IMS	PET; 9	16th	1424

Sporting positions
Preceded by Clément Novalak	BRDC British Formula 3 Championship; Champion; 2020	Succeeded by Zak O'Sullivan
