= Reece Ushijima =

American and Japanese racing driver (born 2003)

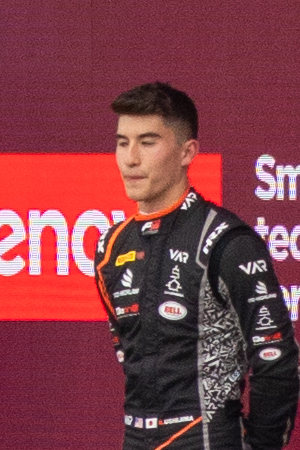
- Ushijima in 2022
- Nationality: (United States) American (Japan) Japanese
- Born: 13 January 2003 (age 23) Laguna Hills, California, United States

USF Pro 2000 Championship career
- Debut season: 2023
- Current team: Jay Howard Driver Development
- Car number: 6
- Starts: 9
- Wins: 0
- Podiums: 1
- Poles: 0
- Fastest laps: 0
- Best finish: TBA in 2023

Previous series
- 2021: GB3 Championship; F3 Asian Championship

Championship titles
- British Karting Championship GYG KZ2 Champion

Reece Ushijima (born 13 January 2003) is an American and Japanese racing driver who most recently competed in the 2023 USF Pro 2000 Championship with Jay Howard Driver Development. He previously competed in the 2022 FIA Formula 3 Championship for Van Amersfoort Racing.

== Career ==
=== Karting ===
Ushijima made his international competitive karting debut in 2017 in the SKUSA SuperNationals for Phil Giebler Racing, competing against the likes of Jak Crawford and Zane Maloney. He then raced in X30 Senior category in IAME Asia, IAME Euroseries, Benelux, Asian Karting Championship, and Super One and British Karting Championships in the UK, racing for Piers Sexton Racing. In 2019, he finished second in the Asian Karting Championship and third in IAME Asia Final.

=== Formula Ford ===
In November 2019, at the age of 16, Ushijima transitioned from karts to cars. On the weekend following his racing licence acquisition he qualified on pole position, finishing third and second in the races and taking fastest lap at the BRSCC Formula Ford Winter Series in Wales, UK.

=== MRF Challenge Formula 2000 ===
In the 2019–20 MRF Challenge Formula 2000 Championship held during the winter in Dubai, Sakhir and Chennai, Ushijima logged two fastest laps and finished seventh in the standings. His best finish was fourth place at the final round in Madras Motor Race Track, Chennai.

=== BRDC Formula 3 Championship ===
==== 2020 ====
For the 2020 season, Ushijima signed with Hitech Grand Prix to race in the BRDC British Formula 3 Championship. The American started off strongly, scoring his maiden podium in the second round, with second at Donington Park. His next podium came at the next round, held at Brands Hatch, however this would be the final podium of his season. Ushijima finished eleventh in the standings, nine places behind teammate Kush Maini.

==== 2021 ====
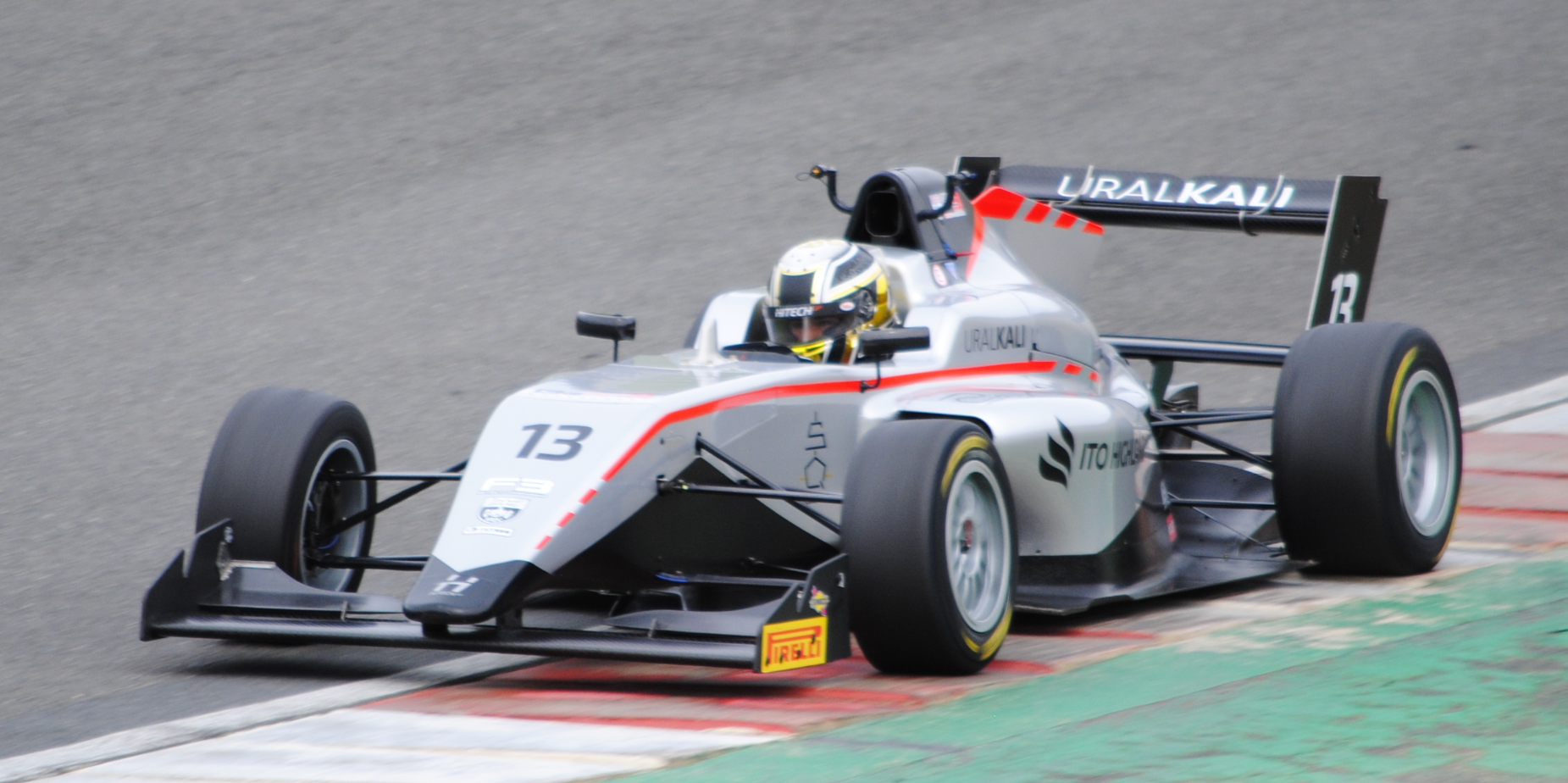
Ushijima at Brands Hatch during the 2021 GB3 Championship

For the 2021 season, Ushijima remained with Hitech, this time alongside Sebastián Álvarez and Bart Horsten. His first podium came at the opening round of the season, with third in race two at Brands Hatch. In the second round at Silverstone Circuit, Ushijima earned double pole, his first pole position in the series, followed up by his maiden wins in races 1 and 2. He would go on to score three more podiums and a further pole on his way to fourth in the final standings.

=== F3 Asian Championship ===
In the winter of 2021, Ushijima competed in the F3 Asian Championship with Hitech GP. He scored 45 points, and with a best race finish of fifth, ended up twelfth in the championship.

=== FIA Formula 3 Championship ===
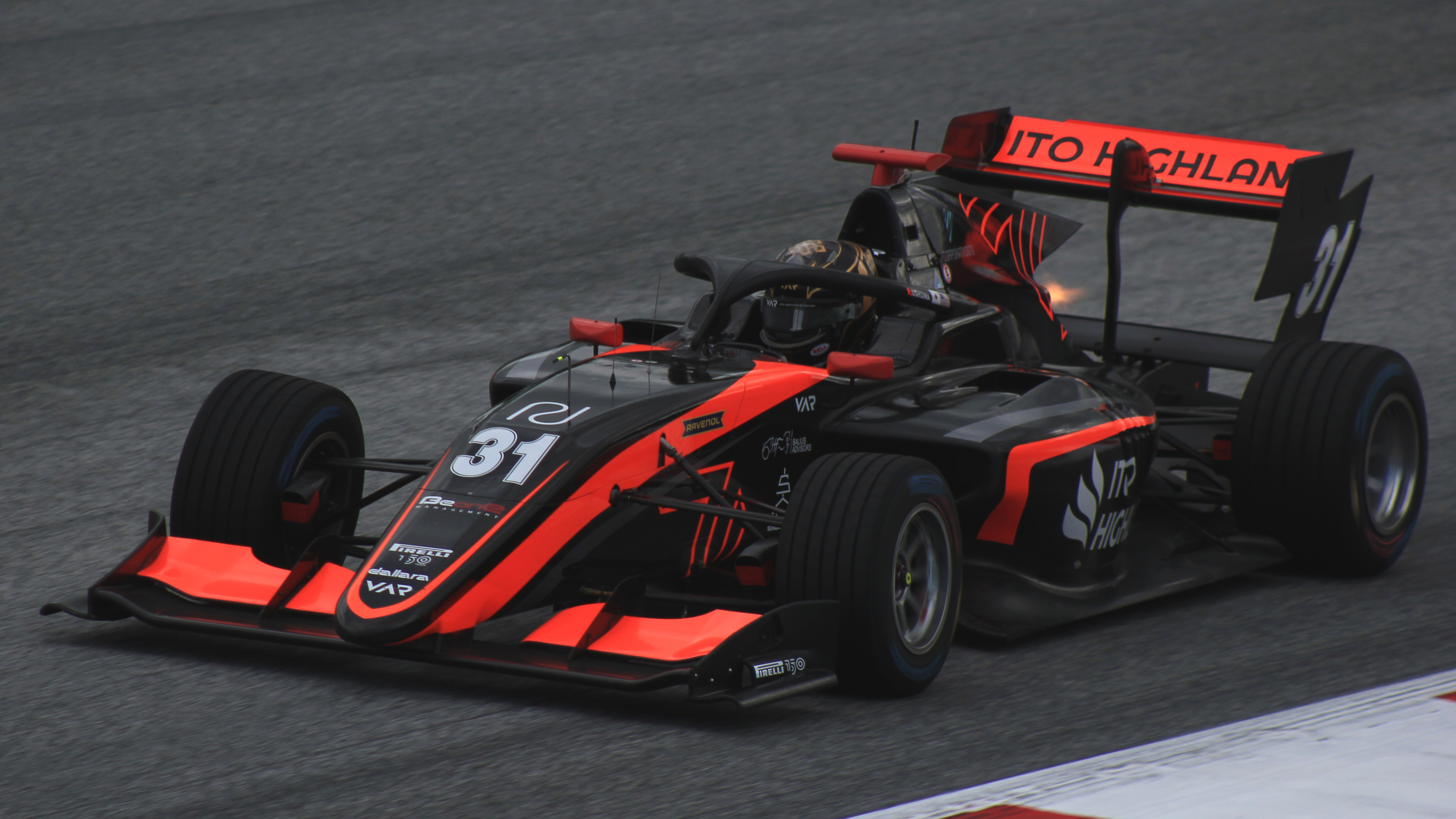
Ushijima driving the Dallara F3 2019 during the 2022 Spielberg Formula 3 round.

Ushijima partook in post-season testing with Van Amersfoort Racing and was confirmed to drive for the team during the 2022 season, partnering Franco Colapinto and Rafael Villagómez.

At the end of the season, Ushijima partook in the post-season test with Hitech Grand Prix.

=== USF Pro 2000 Championship ===
For his 2023 campaign, Ushijima left Formula 3 and signed to compete in the USF Pro 2000 Championship with Jay Howard Driver Development. A second place podium came at the Indianapolis Motor Speedway, being the only highlight of his tough season. He opted to withdraw from the series with three rounds to go, explaining his desire to return to racing in Europe for 2024. Ushijima was 14th in the standings, with 140 points.

== Personal life ==
Ushijima's mother is American; his father, who grew up in the United States, is Japanese. Ushijima was born in California; in a 2023 interview he described America as his "home country." During the same interview he said he "grew up in Europe."

== Karting record ==
=== Karting career summary ===
Season	Series	Team	Position
2017	SKUSA SuperNationals — X30 Junior	Phil Giebler Racing	55th
2019	IAME Series Benelux — Super Shifter		22nd
2019	AKOC Asia — X30 Senior		2nd
2019	IAME International Final — X30 Senior		60th
2019	UK Kartmasters Grand Prix — X30 Senior	Piers Sexton Racing	50th
2019	ROK Cup Superfinal — Senior ROK	Piers Sexton Racing	29th
2019	British Kart Championship — X30 Senior	Piers Sexton Racing	27th
2019	IAME Euro Series — X30 Senior	Piers Sexton Racing	32nd
2019	IAME Asia Cup – X30 Senior	Piers Sexton Racing	6th
2019	IAME Asia Final — X30 Senior	Piers Sexton Racing	3rd

== Racing record ==
=== Racing career summary ===
Season	Series	Team	Races	Wins	Poles	F/Laps	Podiums	Points	Position
2019	BRSCC Formula Ford Winter Series	Oldfield Motorsport	2	0	1	1	2	?	?
2019–20	MRF Challenge Formula 2000	MRF Racing	15	0	1	2	0	104	7th
2020	BRDC British Formula 3 Championship	Hitech Grand Prix	24	0	0	1	2	244	11th
2021	GB3 Championship	Hitech Grand Prix	24	2	3	3	6	366	4th
2021	F3 Asian Championship	Hitech Grand Prix	15	0	0	0	0	45	12th
2022	FIA Formula 3 Championship	Van Amersfoort Racing	18	0	0	0	1	13	20th
2023	USF Pro 2000 Championship	Jay Howard Driver Development	11	0	0	0	1	140	14th

=== Complete MRF Challenge Formula 2000 Championship results ===
(key) (Races in bold indicate pole position; races in italics indicate fastest lap)

Year	Team	1	2	3	4	5	6	7	8	9	10	11	12	13	14	15	DC	Points
2019–20	MRF Racing	DUB; 1; 6	DUB; 2; 5	DUB; 3; 7	DUB; 4; 7	**DUB**; **5**; 5	BHR; 1; 6	BHR; 2; 5	BHR; 3; 7	BHR; 4; 9	CHE; 1; 8	CHE; 2; 8	CHE; 3; 9	CHE; 4; 9	CHE; 5; 4	CHE; 6; 5	7th	104

=== Complete BRDC British F3/GB3 Championship results ===
(key) (Races in bold indicate pole position) (Races in italics indicate fastest lap)

Year	Entrant	1	2	3	4	5	6	7	8	9	10	11	12	13	14	15	16	17	18	19	20	21	22	23	24	DC	Points
2020	Hitech Grand Prix	OUL; 1; 10	OUL; 2; 6	OUL; 3; 15	OUL; 4; 10	DON1; 1; 2	DON1; 2; 15^{2}	DON1; 3; 13	BRH; 1; 14	BRH; 2; 2	BRH; 3; 8	BRH; 4; 9	DON2; 1; 8	DON2; 2; 4^{5}	DON2; 3; 6	SNE; 1; 9	SNE; 2; 11	SNE; 3; 13	SNE; 4; 10	DON3; 1; 10	DON3; 2; 13^{1}	DON3; 3 Ret	SIL; 1 DSQ	SIL; 2; 15^{4}	SIL; 3; 8	11th	244
2021	Hitech Grand Prix	BRH; 1; 5	BRH; 2; 3	BRH; 3; 6^{8}	**SIL1**; **1**; 1	**SIL1**; **2**; 1	SIL1; 3; 10^{6}	DON1; 1; 2	DON1; 2 Ret	DON1; 3 Ret	SPA; 1; 11	SPA; 2; 8	SPA; 3; 6^{5}	SNE; 1 Ret	SNE; 2; 13	SNE; 3; 11^{2}	SIL2; 1; 13	SIL2; 2; 8	SIL2; 3; 6^{9}	OUL; 1; 6	OUL; 2; 5	OUL; 3; 15	DON2; 1; 2	**DON2**; **2**; 2	DON2; 3; 20	4th	366

=== Complete F3 Asian Championship results ===
(key) (Races in bold indicate pole position) (Races in italics indicate fastest lap)

Year	Entrant	1	2	3	4	5	6	7	8	9	10	11	12	13	14	15	DC	Points
2021	Hitech Grand Prix	DUB; 1; 10	DUB; 2; 11	DUB; 3; 6	ABU; 1; 10	ABU; 2; 13	ABU; 3; 6	ABU; 1; 12	ABU; 2; 11	ABU; 3; 10	DUB; 1; 10	DUB; 2; 5	DUB; 3; 6	ABU; 1; 8	ABU; 2; 9	ABU; 3; 10	12th	45

=== Complete FIA Formula 3 Championship results ===
(key) (Races in bold indicate pole position; races in italics indicate points for the fastest lap of top ten finishers)

Year	Entrant	1	2	3	4	5	6	7	8	9	10	11	12	13	14	15	16	17	18	DC	Points
2022	Van Amersfoort Racing	BHR; SPR; 12	BHR; FEA; 17	IMO; SPR; Ret	IMO; FEA; 18	CAT; SPR; 9	CAT; FEA; 19	SIL; SPR; 3	SIL; FEA; 10	RBR; SPR; 17	RBR; FEA; 13	HUN; SPR; 11	HUN; FEA; 14	SPA; SPR; 14	SPA; FEA; 10	ZAN; SPR; 22	ZAN; FEA; 19	MNZ; SPR; 19	MNZ; FEA; 10	20th	13

=== American open-wheel racing results ===
==== USF Pro 2000 Championship ====
(key) (Races in bold indicate pole position) (Races in italics indicate fastest lap) (Races with * indicate most race laps led)

Year	Team	1	2	3	4	5	6	7	8	9	10	11	12	13	14	15	16	17	18	Rank	Points
2023	Jay Howard Driver Development	STP; 1; 6	STP; 2; 19	SEB; 1; 8	SEB; 2; 4	IMS; 1; 2	IMS; 2; 9	IRP; 11	ROA; 1; 13	ROA; 2; 8	MOH; 1; 18	MOH; 2; 6	TOR; 1	TOR; 2	COTA; 1	COTA; 1	POR; 1	POR; 2	POR; 3	14th	140
