= Ido Cohen =

Israeli racing driver

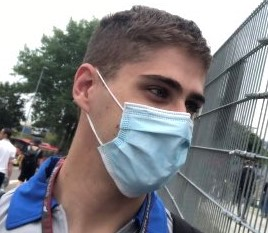
- Cohen at the Red Bull Ring in 2021
- Nationality: (Israel) Israeli
- Born: 16 August 2001 (age 25) Tel Aviv, Israel

FIA Formula 3 Championship career
- Debut season: 2021
- Current team: Rodin Carlin
- Car number: 22
- Former teams: Jenzer Motorsport
- Starts: 55 (56 entries)
- Wins: 0
- Podiums: 0
- Poles: 0
- Fastest laps: 0
- Best finish: 24th in 2021, 2022 & 2023

Previous series
- 2022 2021 2020 2019–20 2018–19 2018–19 2019: FR Asian Championship; FR European Championship; Toyota Racing Series; Euroformula Open Championship; ADAC Formula 4 Italian F4 Championship; FIA Motorsport Games

Ido Cohen (Hebrew: עידו כהן; born 16 August 2001) is an Israeli racing driver who most recently competed in the 2023 FIA Formula 3 Championship for Rodin Carlin.

== Career summary ==
=== Lower formulae ===
Cohen made his car racing debut in 2018, racing in Italian F4 and ADAC Formula 4. In Italian F4, he finished 30th overall (ninth in the Rookie Championship), and in ADAC Formula 4, he finished 19th in the standings.

Cohen would race in these same championships again for 2019, and fared much better, finishing sixth in Italian F4 and 13th in ADAC Formula 4.

Also in 2019, Cohen raced in the Formula 4 category of the FIA Motorsport Games for Team Israel, where he won the qualifying race, but then dropped back to 13th in the main race.

=== Euroformula Open Championship ===
==== 2019 ====
Cohen raced in the final two rounds of the 2019 Euroformula Open Championship as a guest driver for Carlin Motorsport, where he had a best finish of seventh.

==== 2020 ====
Cohen would then race full time in the series in 2020 with Carlin, where he finished seventh in the standings with 114 points and two podiums.

=== FIA Formula 3 Championship ===
==== 2021 ====
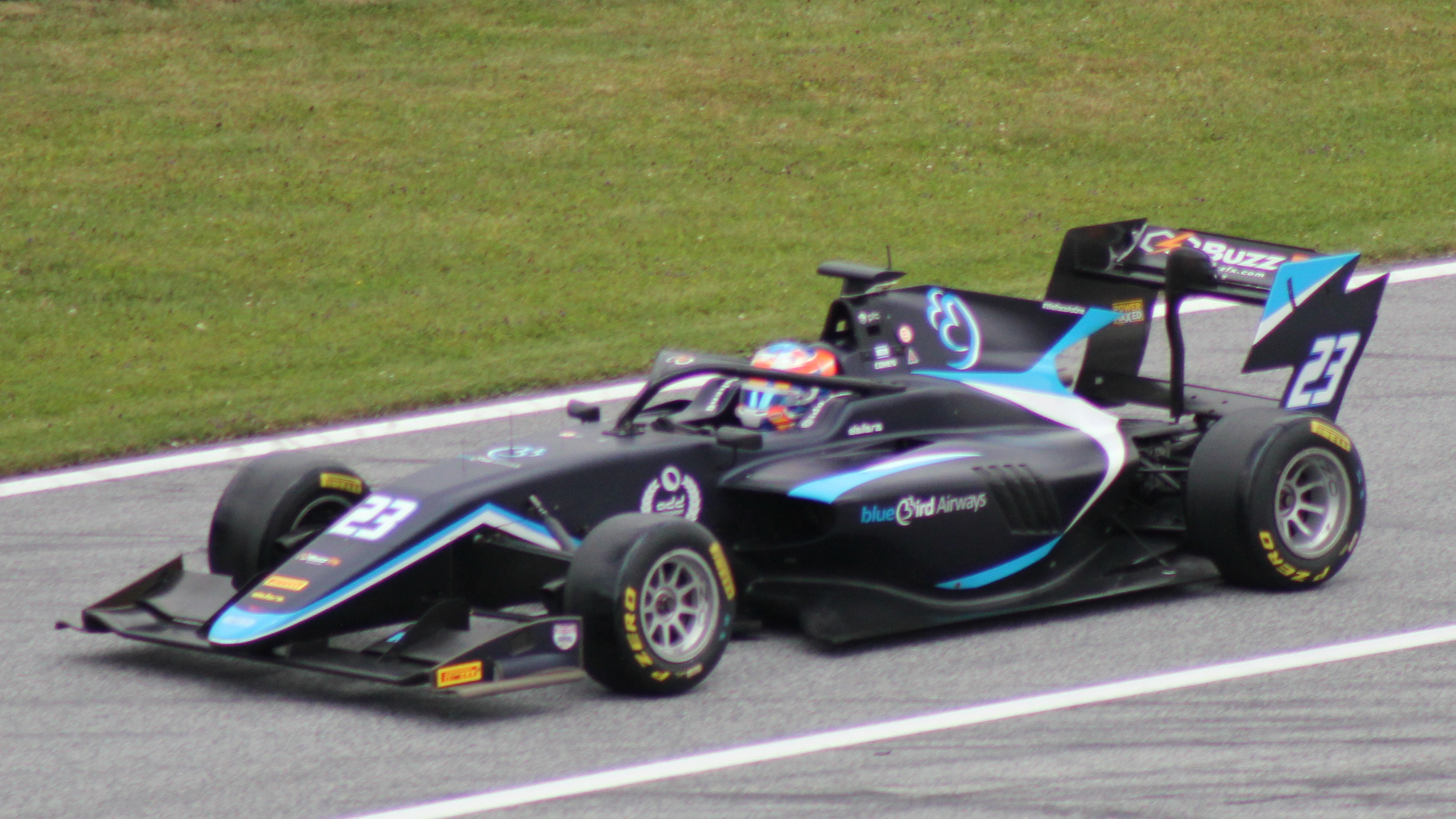
Cohen driving the Dallara F3 2019 during the 2021 Spielberg Formula 3 round.

In October 2020, Cohen tested in the 2020 FIA Formula 3 Championship post season test with Carlin at the Circuit de Barcelona-Catalunya, where he managed 23rd on Day 1. He then tested again with the team in the second post season test at Circuito de Jerez, where he again achieved 23rd place. In February 2021, it was announced that Cohen would race full time for Carlin Buzz Racing in the FIA Formula 3 Championship, alongside Kaylen Frederick and former Italian F4 rival Jonny Edgar.

==== 2022 ====
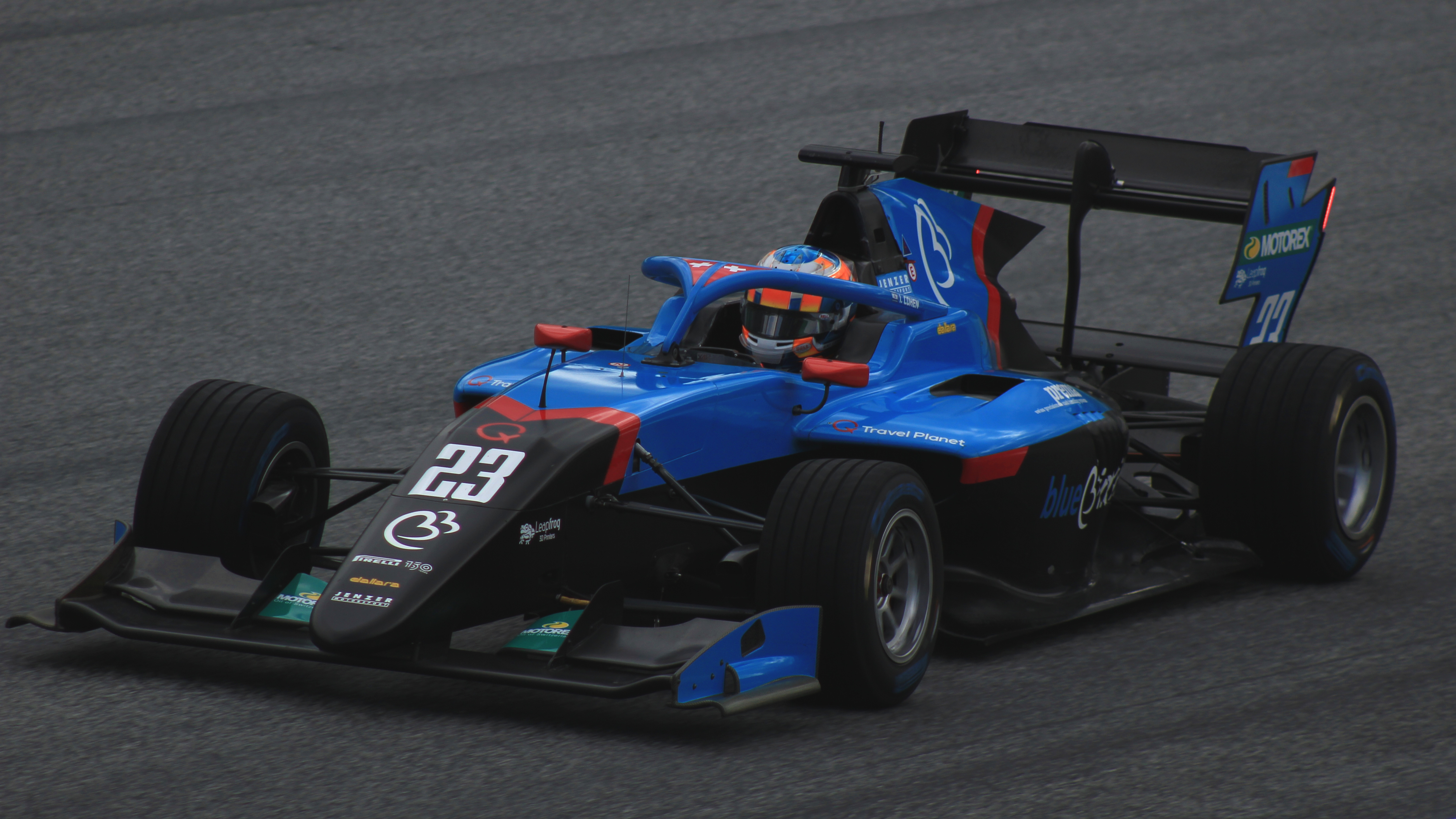
Cohen driving for Jenzer Motorsport during the 2022 Spielberg Formula 3 round.

Cohen joined Jenzer Motorsport for the 2022 season, after testing with the Swiss outfit during the final day of 2021 post-season testing. Cohen had a disappointing season, but he scored his first points finish in the seventh round at Spielberg in the feature race, where he finished ninth. He ended the season 24th in the standings with two points, ahead of teammate Federico Malvestiti but far from his other teammate William Alatalo.

==== 2023 ====
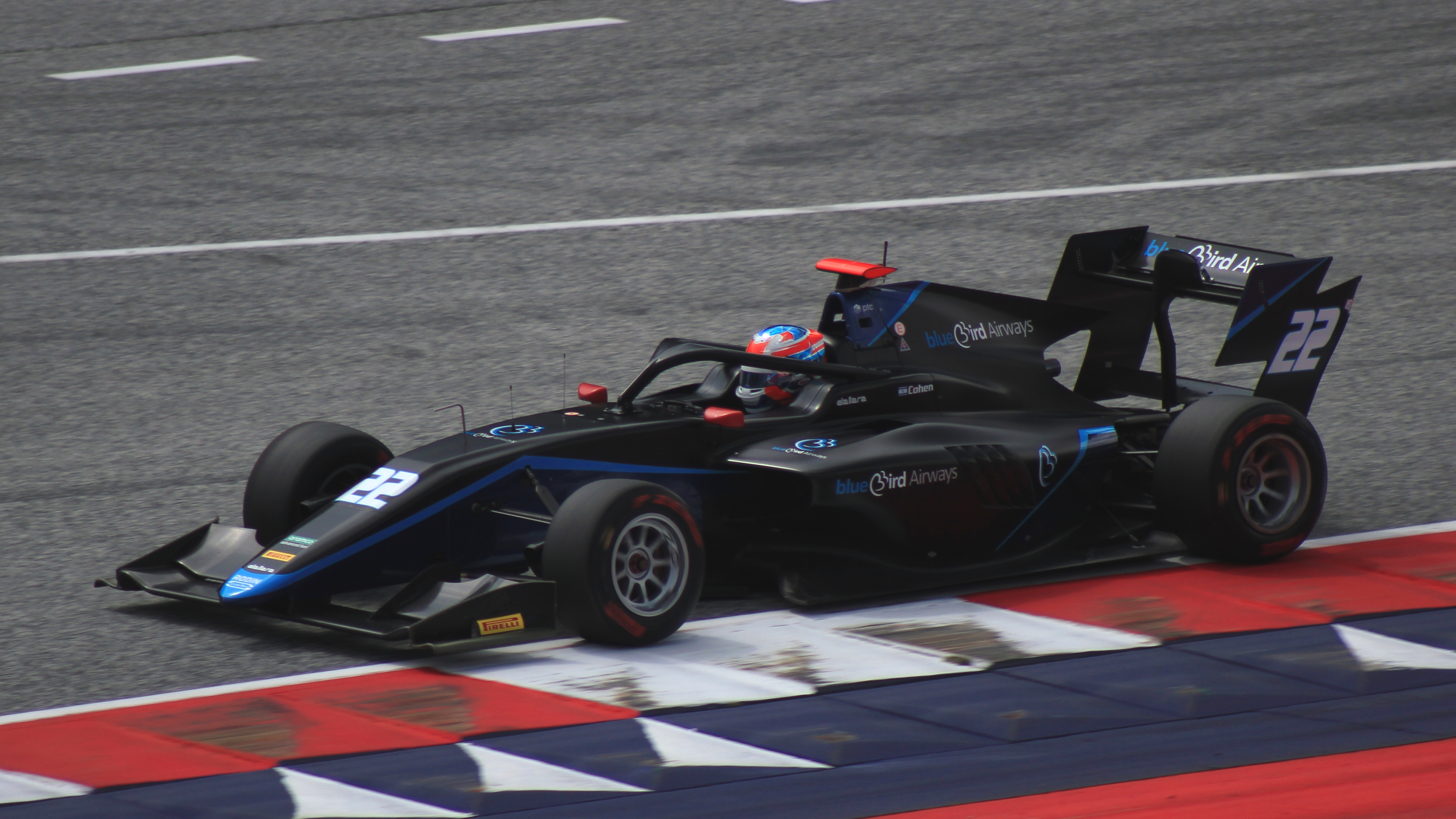
Cohen driving for Rodin Carlin during the 2023 Spielberg Formula 3 round.

Staying in the category for a third season, Cohen would return to the rebranded Rodin Carlin outfit to drive in Formula 3, partnering Oliver Gray and Hunter Yeany. As in 2022, Cohen scored two points, coming ninth in the Silverstone sprint race. Cohen ended up 24th in the championship for the third year running.

== Personal life ==
Cohen's father Amihai Cohen owns Greek airline Bluebird Airways.

== Karting record ==
=== Karting career summary ===
| Season | Series | Team | Position |
|---|---|---|---|
| 2014 | Rotax Winter Cup — Junior | | 22nd |
| 2014 | Rotax International Open — Junior | | 14th |
| 2014 | Rotax Max Euro Challenge — Junior | | 46th |
| 2014 | CIK-FIA Karting Academy Trophy | Cohen, Amihai | 36th |
| 2015 | WSK Champions Cup — KFJ | RL-Competition.COM | 49th |
| 2015 | Rotax Max Wintercup — Junior | | 31st |
| 2015 | WSK Super Master Series — KFJ | CRG SpA | 76th |
| 2015 | German Karting Championship — Junior | CRG SpA | 14th |
| 2015 | CIK-FIA European Championship — KFJ | CRG SpA | NC† |
| 2015 | Rotax Max Euro Challenge — Junior | CRG SpA | 28th |
| 2015 | CIK-FIA Karting Academy Trophy | Cohen, Amihai | 16th |
| 2016 | WSK Champions Cup — OK | CRG SpA | NC |
| 2016 | Rotax Max Wintercup — Senior | CRG SpA | 20th |
| 2016 | Rotax International Open — Senior | CRG SpA | 8th |
| 2016 | WSK Super Master Series — OK | CRG SpA | 29th |
| 2016 | Rotax Max Euro Challenge — Senior | CRG SpA | 36th |
| 2017 | Rotax Max Wintercup — Senior | | 32nd |
| 2017 | IAME Euro Series — X30 Senior | | 12th |
| 2017 | Rotax Max Euro Challenge — Senior | | 22nd |

^{†} As Cohen was a guest driver, he was ineligible to score points.

== Racing record ==
=== Racing career summary ===
| Season | Series | Team | Races | Wins | Poles | F/Laps | Podiums | Points | Position |
|---|---|---|---|---|---|---|---|---|---|
| 2018 | Italian F4 Championship | BWT Mücke Motorsport | 21 | 0 | 0 | 0 | 0 | 0 | 30th |
| 2018 | ADAC Formula 4 Championship | BWT Mücke Motorsport | 18 | 0 | 0 | 0 | 0 | 7 | 19th |
| 2019 | Italian F4 Championship | Van Amersfoort Racing | 20 | 0 | 0 | 0 | 3 | 132 | 6th |
| 2019 | ADAC Formula 4 Championship | Van Amersfoort Racing | 20 | 0 | 0 | 0 | 1 | 76 | 13th |
| 2019 | Euroformula Open Championship | Carlin Motorsport | 4 | 0 | 0 | 0 | 0 | 0 | NC† |
| 2019 | FIA Motorsport Games Formula 4 Cup | Team Israel | 1 | 0 | 1 | 0 | 0 | N/A | 13th |
| 2020 | Euroformula Open Championship | Carlin Motorsport | 18 | 0 | 0 | 0 | 2 | 114 | 7th |
| 2020 | Toyota Racing Series | M2 Competition | 15 | 0 | 0 | 0 | 0 | 164 | 9th |
| 2021 | FIA Formula 3 Championship | Carlin Buzz Racing | 20 | 0 | 0 | 0 | 0 | 0 | 24th |
| 2021 | Formula Regional European Championship | JD Motorsport | 8 | 0 | 0 | 0 | 0 | 0 | 27th |
| 2022 | Formula Regional Asian Championship | BlackArts Racing | 6 | 0 | 0 | 0 | 0 | 4 | 21st |
| 2022 | FIA Formula 3 Championship | Jenzer Motorsport | 18 | 0 | 0 | 0 | 0 | 2 | 24th |
| 2023 | FIA Formula 3 Championship | Rodin Carlin | 18 | 0 | 0 | 0 | 0 | 2 | 24th |

^{†} As Cohen was a guest driver, he was ineligible to score points.

=== Complete Italian F4 Championship results ===
(key) (Races in bold indicate pole position) (Races in italics indicate fastest lap)

| Year | Team | 1 | 2 | 3 | 4 | 5 | 6 | 7 | 8 | 9 | 10 | 11 | 12 | 13 | 14 | 15 | 16 | 17 | 18 | 19 | 20 | 21 | 22 | Pos | Points |
|---|---|---|---|---|---|---|---|---|---|---|---|---|---|---|---|---|---|---|---|---|---|---|---|---|---|
| 2018 | BWT Mücke Motorsport | ADR; 1; 16 | ADR; 2; 11 | ADR; 3 Ret | LEC; 1; 16 | LEC; 2; 15 | LEC; 3; 18 | MNZ; 1; 13 | MNZ; 2 Ret | MNZ; 3 Ret | MIS; 1 Ret | MIS; 2; 18 | MIS; 3; 15 | IMO; 1; 26 | IMO; 2; 16 | IMO; 3 Ret | VLL; 1; 15 | VLL; 2; 17 | VLL; 3 Ret | MUG; 1; 15 | MUG; 2; 14 | MUG; 3; 16 | | 30th | 0 |
| 2019 | Van Amersfoort Racing | VLL; 1 Ret | VLL; 2; 2 | VLL; 3; 12 | MIS; 1; 8 | MIS; 2; 5 | MIS; 3 C | HUN; 1; 6 | HUN; 2; 11 | HUN; 3; 3 | RBR; 1; 7 | RBR; 2; 6 | RBR; 3; 30 | IMO; 1; 5 | IMO; 2; 7 | IMO; 3; 6 | IMO; 4 Ret | MUG; 1; 6 | MUG; 2; 3 | MUG; 3; 11 | MNZ; 1; 7 | MNZ; 2; 9 | MNZ; 3; 6 | 6th | 132 |

=== Complete ADAC Formula 4 Championship results ===
(key) (Races in bold indicate pole position) (Races in italics indicate fastest lap)

| Year | Team | 1 | 2 | 3 | 4 | 5 | 6 | 7 | 8 | 9 | 10 | 11 | 12 | 13 | 14 | 15 | 16 | 17 | 18 | 19 | 20 | Pos | Points |
|---|---|---|---|---|---|---|---|---|---|---|---|---|---|---|---|---|---|---|---|---|---|---|---|
| 2018 | BWT Mücke Motorsport | OSC; 1 Ret | OSC; 2; 16 | OSC; 3 Ret | HOC1; 1; 14 | HOC1; 2; 13 | HOC1; 3; 14 | LAU; 1; 8 | LAU; 2; 14 | LAU; 3; 13 | RBR; 1; 13 | RBR; 2; 10 | RBR; 3; 14 | HOC2; 1; 18 | HOC2; 2; 13 | NÜR; 1; 14 | NÜR; 2; 11 | NÜR; 3; 9 | HOC3; 1 | HOC3; 2 | HOC3; 3 | 19th | 7 |
| 2019 | Van Amersfoort Racing | OSC; 1; 8 | OSC; 2 Ret | OSC; 3; 11 | RBR; 1; 10 | RBR; 2; 5 | RBR; 3; 13 | HOC; 1; 6 | HOC; 2; 17 | ZAN; 1; 12 | ZAN; 2; 13 | ZAN; 3; 14 | NÜR; 1; 5 | NÜR; 2; 13 | NÜR; 3; 10 | HOC; 1; 7 | HOC; 2; 7 | HOC; 3; 3 | SAC; 1; 12 | SAC; 2; 13 | SAC; 3; 4 | 13th | 76 |

=== Complete FIA Motorsport Games results ===
| Year | Entrant | Cup | Qualifying | Quali Race | Main race |
|---|---|---|---|---|---|
| 2019 | Team Israel | **Formula 4** | **2nd** | **1st** | 13th |

=== Complete Euroformula Open Championship results ===
(key) (Races in bold indicate pole position) (Races in italics indicate fastest lap)

| Year | Team | 1 | 2 | 3 | 4 | 5 | 6 | 7 | 8 | 9 | 10 | 11 | 12 | 13 | 14 | 15 | 16 | 17 | 18 | Pos | Points |
|---|---|---|---|---|---|---|---|---|---|---|---|---|---|---|---|---|---|---|---|---|---|
| 2019 | Carlin Motorsport | LEC; 1 | LEC; 2 | PAU; 1 | PAU; 2 | HOC; 1 | HOC; 2 | SPA; 1 | SPA; 2 | HUN; 1 | HUN; 2 | RBR; 1 | RBR; 2 | SIL; 1 | SIL; 2 | CAT; 1; 7 | CAT; 2; 13 | MNZ; 1; 13 | MNZ; 2; 8 | NC | - |
| 2020 | Carlin Motorsport | HUN; 1; 6 | HUN; 2; 4 | LEC; 1; 4 | LEC; 2; 5 | RBR; 1; 5 | RBR; 2; 6 | MNZ; 1; 11 | MNZ; 2 Ret | MNZ; 3; 11 | MUG; 1; 6 | MUG; 2; 9 | SPA; 1; 3 | SPA; 2; 2 | SPA; 3; 7 | CAT; 1; 10 | CAT; 2; 11 | CAT; 3 NC | CAT; 4; 8 | 7th | 114 |

=== Complete Toyota Racing Series results ===
(key) (Races in bold indicate pole position) (Races in italics indicate fastest lap)

| Year | Team | 1 | 2 | 3 | 4 | 5 | 6 | 7 | 8 | 9 | 10 | 11 | 12 | 13 | 14 | 15 | DC | Points |
|---|---|---|---|---|---|---|---|---|---|---|---|---|---|---|---|---|---|---|
| 2020 | M2 Competition | HIG; 1; 10 | HIG; 2; 11 | HIG; 3; 7 | TER; 1; 5 | TER; 2; 4 | TER; 3; 11 | HMP; 1; 11 | HMP; 2; 14 | HMP; 3 Ret | PUK; 1; 7 | PUK; 2; 8 | PUK; 3; 6 | MAN; 1; 11 | MAN; 2; 11 | MAN; 3; 11 | 9th | 164 |

=== Complete FIA Formula 3 Championship results ===
(key) (Races in bold indicate pole position; races in italics indicate points for the fastest lap of top ten finishers)

| Year | Entrant | 1 | 2 | 3 | 4 | 5 | 6 | 7 | 8 | 9 | 10 | 11 | 12 | 13 | 14 | 15 | 16 | 17 | 18 | 19 | 20 | 21 | DC | Points |
|---|---|---|---|---|---|---|---|---|---|---|---|---|---|---|---|---|---|---|---|---|---|---|---|---|
| 2021 | Carlin Buzz Racing | CAT; 1; 29 | CAT; 2; 20 | CAT; 3; 22 | LEC; 1; 24 | LEC; 2 Ret | LEC; 3; 24 | RBR; 1 Ret | RBR; 2; 20 | RBR; 3; 16 | HUN; 1; 28† | HUN; 2; 27 | HUN; 3 Ret | SPA; 1 Ret | SPA; 2; 20 | SPA; 3; 20 | ZAN; 1; 12 | ZAN; 2; 26† | ZAN; 3; 16 | SOC; 1; 27 | SOC; 2 C | SOC; 3 Ret | 24th | 0 |
| 2022 | Jenzer Motorsport | BHR; SPR; 14 | BHR; FEA; 15 | IMO; SPR; 23 | IMO; FEA; 13 | CAT; SPR; 23 | CAT; FEA; 22 | SIL; SPR; 17 | SIL; FEA; 15 | RBR; SPR; 14 | RBR; FEA; 9 | HUN; SPR; Ret | HUN; FEA; 17 | SPA; SPR; 24† | SPA; FEA; Ret | ZAN; SPR; 29 | ZAN; FEA; 16 | MNZ; SPR; 15 | MNZ; FEA; 12 | | | | 24th | 2 |
| 2023 | Rodin Carlin | BHR; SPR; 18 | BHR; FEA; 18 | MEL; SPR; Ret | MEL; FEA; Ret | MON; SPR; 19 | MON; FEA; Ret | CAT; SPR; Ret | CAT; FEA; 26 | RBR; SPR; 17 | RBR; FEA; Ret | SIL; SPR; 9 | SIL; FEA; 24 | HUN; SPR; Ret | HUN; FEA; 22 | SPA; SPR; Ret | SPA; FEA; Ret | MNZ; SPR; 21 | MNZ; FEA; Ret | | | | 24th | 2 |

^{†} Driver did not finish the race, but was classified as they completed more than 90% of the race distance.

=== Complete Formula Regional European Championship results ===
(key) (Races in bold indicate pole position) (Races in italics indicate fastest lap)

| Year | Team | 1 | 2 | 3 | 4 | 5 | 6 | 7 | 8 | 9 | 10 | 11 | 12 | 13 | 14 | 15 | 16 | 17 | 18 | 19 | 20 | DC | Points |
|---|---|---|---|---|---|---|---|---|---|---|---|---|---|---|---|---|---|---|---|---|---|---|---|
| 2021 | JD Motorsport | IMO; 1 | IMO; 2 | CAT; 1 | CAT; 2 | MCO; 1 | MCO; 2 | LEC; 1 | LEC; 2 | ZAN; 1 | ZAN; 2 | SPA; 1; 21 | SPA; 2; 15 | RBR; 1; 25 | RBR; 2; 15 | VAL; 1 | VAL; 2 | MUG; 1; 13 | MUG; 2 Ret | MNZ; 1; 25 | MNZ; 2 Ret | 27th | 0 |

=== Complete Formula Regional Asian Championship results ===
(key) (Races in bold indicate pole position) (Races in italics indicate the fastest lap of top ten finishers)

| Year | Entrant | 1 | 2 | 3 | 4 | 5 | 6 | 7 | 8 | 9 | 10 | 11 | 12 | 13 | 14 | 15 | DC | Points |
|---|---|---|---|---|---|---|---|---|---|---|---|---|---|---|---|---|---|---|
| 2022 | BlackArts Racing | ABU; 1 WD | ABU; 2 WD | ABU; 3 WD | DUB; 1 | DUB; 2 | DUB; 3 | DUB; 1 | DUB; 2 | DUB; 3 | DUB; 1; 25† | DUB; 2; 26† | DUB; 3; 8 | ABU; 1; 27 | ABU; 2; 11 | ABU; 3; 15 | 21st | 4 |
