= 2021 FIA Formula 3 Championship =

Motor racing championship held in 2021

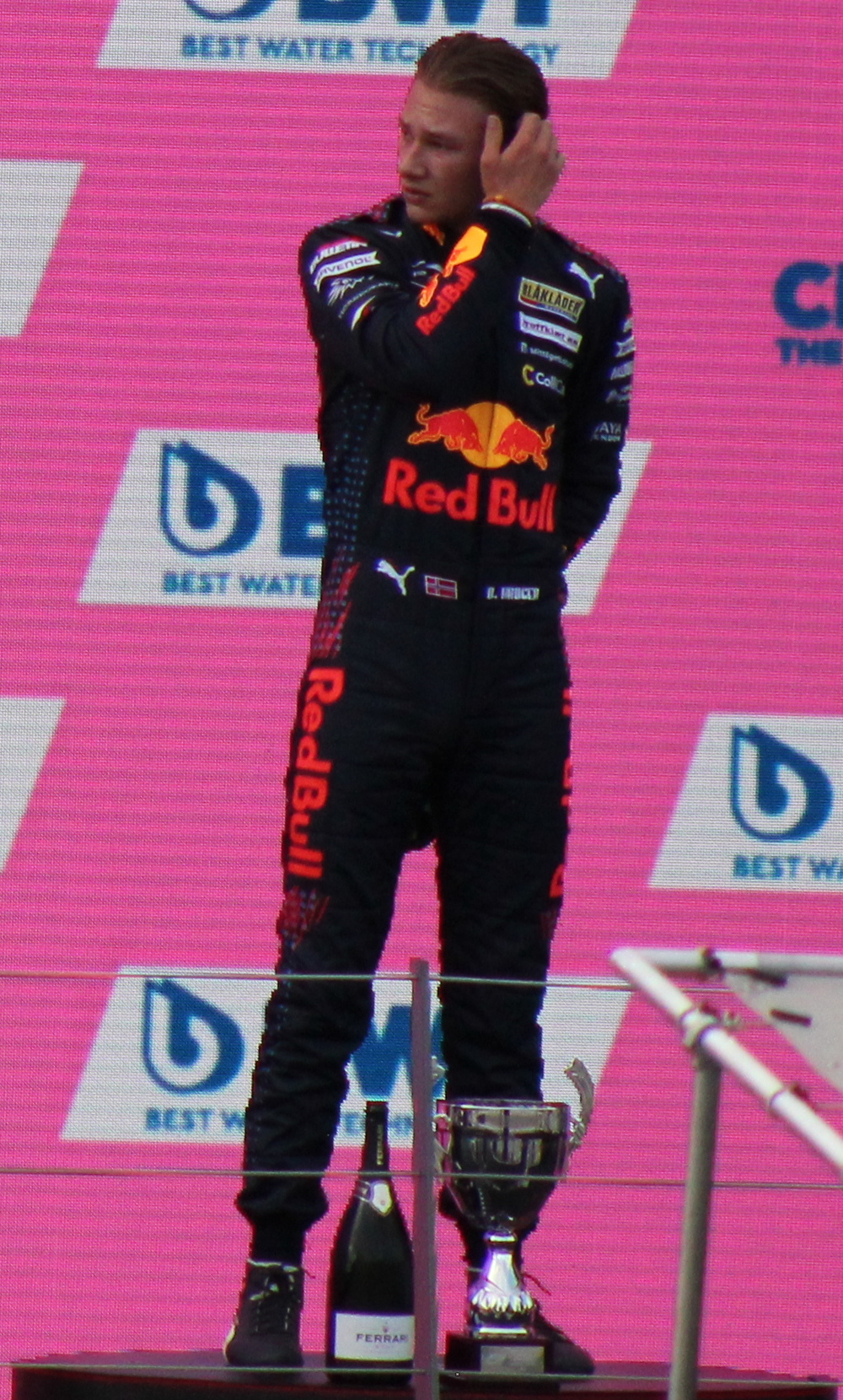
Dennis Hauger won the 2021 Formula 3 Championship.

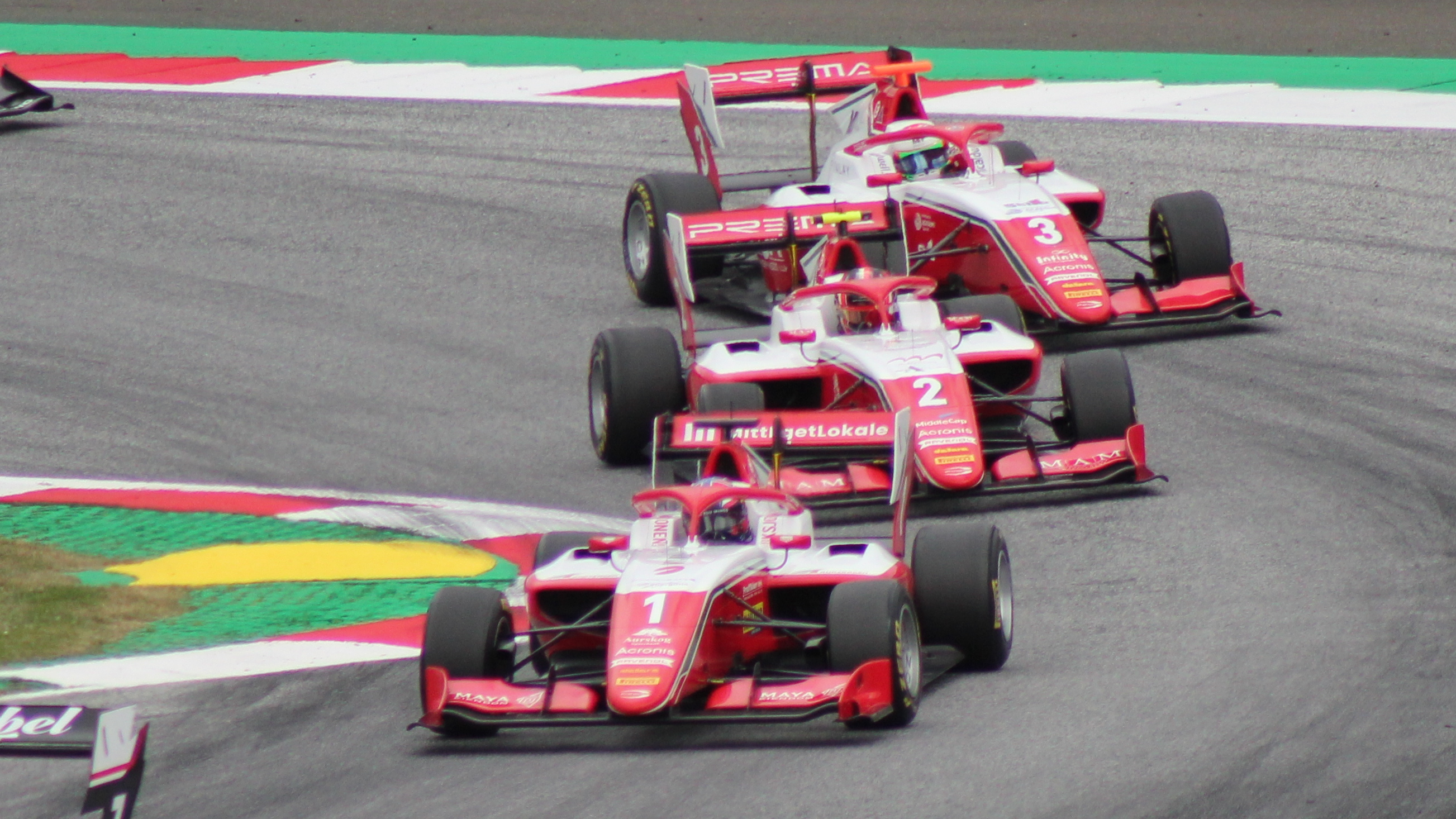
Prema Racing entered the season as the defending teams' champions.

The 2021 FIA Formula 3 Championship was a motor racing championship for Formula 3 cars that was sanctioned by the Fédération Internationale de l'Automobile (FIA). The championship was the twelfth season of Formula 3 racing and the third season run under the guise of the FIA Formula 3 Championship, an open-wheel racing category that serves as the third tier of formula racing in the FIA Global Pathway. The category was run in support of selected rounds of the 2021 FIA Formula One World Championship. As the championship was a spec series, all teams and drivers that competed in the championship ran the same car, the Dallara F3 2019. The championship was contested over twenty-one races at seven circuits. It started in May with a round in support of the Spanish Grand Prix and ended in September on the weekend of the Russian Grand Prix.

Dennis Hauger became the third FIA F3 drivers' champion in his second year in the series. Having moved from Hitech Grand Prix to Prema Racing over the winter, Hauger laid down the gauntlet with pole position in Barcelona, but a collision in the final laps of Race 2 knocked him out of contention for a maiden victory in the series. Nevertheless, Hauger rebounded on Sunday to win Race 3 and assume the championship lead, which he never relinquished. Strong weekends at the Red Bull Ring and the Hungaroring enabled Hauger to extend his lead to 63 points—nearly a full weekend's worth—as the championship entered its summer break, and he ultimately secured the title in Race 1 of the last race at Sochi.

A late surge from Jack Doohan propelled him to second place in the drivers' championship. Like fellow Red Bull–affiliated driver Hauger, Doohan took four wins across the season. In Belgium, Doohan became the first driver in series history to take two wins in one weekend after winning Races 2 and 3; with all three Prema cars struggling in the wet conditions at Spa-Francorchamps that weekend, Doohan and his Trident team—which also fielded Clément Novalak and David Schumacher—closed their respective championship gaps to Hauger and Prema significantly. Though Doohan could not supplant Hauger in the drivers' championship, Trident did beat Prema by four points to take their first teams' championship in the series and their first in any category in 16 years of competition.

In an effort to cut costs during the COVID-19 pandemic, series organizers adopted a new format for both F3 and its parent championship, FIA Formula 2, for the 2021 season. Notably, each weekend comprised three races rather than two; the traditional feature race was moved from Saturday afternoon to Sunday morning and renamed Race 3, while Races 1 and 2 adopted reverse-grid formats based on the results of qualifying and Race 1 respectively. The extra race was made possible because F2 races were run on different weekends to F3, with the exception of the Sochi round, leaving more space in the timetable of each race weekend.

The schedule adjustments also allowed several drivers to move between F2 and F3 mid-season. Matteo Nannini entered the opening F2 event with his F3 team, HWA Racelab, and two later events with Campos Racing; Jake Hughes and Enzo Fittipaldi joined the grid at Monza in September; and Doohan, Novalak, Logan Sargeant, and Olli Caldwell all made their F2 débuts at Jeddah in December. Despite enabling these opportunities, the format used in 2021 was unpopular with many in the paddock, and it was altered again for the 2022 season.

== Entries ==
As the championship was a spec series, all teams competed with an identical Dallara F3 2019 chassis and tyre compounds developed by Pirelli. Each car was powered by a 3.4 L (207 cu in) naturally-aspirated V6 engine developed by Mecachrome.

Teams	No.	Driver	Rounds
(Italy) Prema Racing	1	(Norway) Dennis Hauger	All
(Italy) Prema Racing	2	(Monaco) Arthur Leclerc	All
(Italy) Prema Racing	3	(United Kingdom) Olli Caldwell	All
(Italy) Trident	4	(Australia) Jack Doohan	All
(Italy) Trident	5	(France) Clément Novalak	All
(Italy) Trident	6	(Germany) David Schumacher	All
(France) ART Grand Prix	7	(Denmark) Frederik Vesti	All
(France) ART Grand Prix	8	(Russia) Alexander Smolyar	All
(France) ART Grand Prix	9	(United States) Juan Manuel Correa	All
(United Kingdom) Hitech Grand Prix	10	(United States) Jak Crawford	All
(United Kingdom) Hitech Grand Prix	11	(Japan) Ayumu Iwasa	All
(United Kingdom) Hitech Grand Prix	12	(Czech Republic) Roman Staněk	All
(Germany) HWA Racelab	14	(Italy) Matteo Nannini	All
(Germany) HWA Racelab	15	(Denmark) Oliver Rasmussen	All
(Germany) HWA Racelab	16	(Mexico) Rafael Villagómez	All
(Netherlands) MP Motorsport	17	(France) Victor Martins	All
(Netherlands) MP Motorsport	18	(Brazil) Caio Collet	All
(Netherlands) MP Motorsport	19	(Netherlands) Tijmen van der Helm	All
(Spain) Campos Racing	20	(Hungary) László Tóth	1, 3–7
(Spain) Campos Racing	20	(France) Pierre-Louis Chovet	2
(Spain) Campos Racing	21	(Italy) Lorenzo Colombo	All
(Spain) Campos Racing	22	(Belgium) Amaury Cordeel	All
(United Kingdom) Carlin Buzz Racing	23	(Israel) Ido Cohen	All
(United Kingdom) Carlin Buzz Racing	24	(United States) Kaylen Frederick	1–3, 6–7
(United Kingdom) Carlin Buzz Racing	24	(United Kingdom) Jake Hughes	4
(United Kingdom) Carlin Buzz Racing	25	(United Kingdom) Jonny Edgar	All
(Switzerland) Jenzer Motorsport	26	(Australia) Calan Williams	All
(Switzerland) Jenzer Motorsport	27	(France) Pierre-Louis Chovet	1
(Switzerland) Jenzer Motorsport	27	(United Kingdom) Johnathan Hoggard	2–7
(Switzerland) Jenzer Motorsport	28	(Romania) Filip Ugran	All
(Czech Republic) Charouz Racing System	29	(United States) Logan Sargeant	All
(Czech Republic) Charouz Racing System	30	(Brazil) Enzo Fittipaldi	1–4
(Czech Republic) Charouz Racing System	30	(United States) Hunter Yeany	5–6
(Czech Republic) Charouz Racing System	30	(United Kingdom) Ayrton Simmons	7
(Czech Republic) Charouz Racing System	31	(France) Reshad de Gerus	1–4
(Czech Republic) Charouz Racing System	31	(Portugal) Zdeněk Chovanec (Note: Zdeněk Chovanec was a Czech-Venezuelan-Portuguese driver competing under a Portuguese licence.)	5–7

=== In detail ===
Prema Racing fielded a new driver lineup as reigning champion Oscar Piastri graduated to Formula 2, (Note: Under the series' sporting regulations, the FIA Formula 3 drivers' champion is not permitted to continue racing in the championship) Logan Sargeant moved to Charouz Racing System and Mercedes-backed Frederik Vesti joined ART Grand Prix. The seats were filled by Ferrari-backed Formula Regional European runner-up Arthur Leclerc, Red Bull-backed Dennis Hauger, who moved from Hitech Grand Prix, and Olli Caldwell, who moved from Trident.

Trident signed three new drivers to replace Caldwell, Lirim Zendeli and David Beckmann, as Zendeli and Beckmann graduated to Formula 2. Clément Novalak and David Schumacher joined the team from Carlin Buzz Racing, alongside Red Bull-supported Jack Doohan who switched from HWA Racelab.

ART Grand Prix's Théo Pourchaire, who finished as runner-up in 2020, graduated to the team's Formula 2 outfit. Sebastián Fernández also left the series. ART retained Aleksandr Smolyar and signed Frederik Vesti and Juan Manuel Correa, who made his return to racing after being seriously injured in a Formula 2 crash in 2019.

Hitech Grand Prix fielded three new drivers as Dennis Hauger left, Liam Lawson graduated to Formula 2 and Pierre-Louis Chovet moved to Jenzer Motorsport. The team signed Red Bull juniors Jak Crawford and Ayumu Iwasa, ADAC Formula 4 runner-up and French Formula 4 champion respectively, alongside Roman Staněk who moved from Charouz Racing System.

HWA Racelab did not retain Jake Hughes, who left the series to become Venturi Racing's reserve driver in Formula E. Enzo Fittipaldi and Jack Doohan also left the team, with Fittipaldi joining Charouz Racing System. HWA Racelab signed Matteo Nannini, who switched from Jenzer Motorsport, Formula Regional European graduate Oliver Rasmussen and Formula 4 graduate Rafael Villagómez.

MP Motorsport's 2020 drivers Richard Verschoor, Bent Viscaal and Lukas Dunner all left the series, with Verschoor and Viscaal graduating to Formula 2. The team signed Alpine Academy drivers Victor Martins and Caio Collet, reigning Formula Renault Eurocup champion and runner-up respectively, alongside Tijmen van der Helm who also graduated from the series.

Campos Racing signed three new drivers as Alex Peroni left to compete in Indy Lights, Alessio Deledda graduated to Formula 2 and Sophia Flörsch left the series to race in Deutsche Tourenwagen Masters and the FIA World Endurance Championship. Formula Renault Eurocup graduates László Tóth, Lorenzo Colombo and Amaury Cordeel joined the team.

Carlin Buzz Racing fielded a new lineup as Clément Novalak and David Schumacher left, and Cameron Das returned to the Euroformula Open championship. Red Bull junior and reigning ADAC Formula 4 champion Jonny Edgar joined the team, alongside reigning BRDC British Formula 3 champion Kaylen Frederick and Euroformula Open graduate Ido Cohen.

Jenzer Motorsport retained Calan Williams, and Matteo Nannini and Federico Malvestiti left the team. Formula 4 graduate Filip Ugran joined Jenzer alongside Pierre-Louis Chovet.

Charouz Racing System did not retain Igor Fraga or Michael Belov, with Roman Staněk leaving the team. Charouz signed Formula Renault Eurocup graduate Reshad de Gerus to race alongside Logan Sargeant and Enzo Fittipaldi.

=== Mid-season changes ===
For the second round at the Circuit Paul Ricard, BRDC British Formula 3 runner-up Johnathan Hoggard replaced Pierre-Louis Chovet at Jenzer, with Chovet citing sponsorship issues as the reason for the change. Campos driver László Tóth tested positive for COVID-19 shortly prior to the round and was forced to withdraw. He was replaced by Chovet. Tóth returned to Campos for the third round at the Red Bull Ring.

Kaylen Frederick missed the fourth round at the Hungaroring as he was still recovering from a thumb injury sustained in a crash at the Red Bull Ring. Former HWA Racelab driver Jake Hughes replaced him at Carlin Buzz Racing.

Charouz Racing System made two driver changes for the fifth round at Spa-Francorchamps. Enzo Fittipaldi was promoted to the team's Formula 2 outfit and Reshad de Gerus left the team. They were replaced by Indy Pro 2000 racer Hunter Yeany and Euroformula Open driver Zdeněk Chovanec. Kaylen Frederick was set to return at Spa-Francorchamps having recovered from his thumb injury, but was required to sit out the event after testing positive for COVID-19. Carlin did not replace him and the team only fielded two cars. Frederick returned to Carlin for the sixth round at Circuit Zandvoort.

Hunter Yeany was forced to miss the season finale at Sochi Autodrom due to clashing commitments. He was replaced by GB3 Championship title contender Ayrton Simmons.

== Calendar ==
A provisional calendar was published on 10 November 2020.

Round	Circuit	Races 1 & 2	Race 3
1	(Spain) Circuit de Barcelona-Catalunya, Montmeló	8 May	9 May
2	(France) Circuit Paul Ricard, Le Castellet	19 June	20 June
3	(Austria) Red Bull Ring, Spielberg	3 July	4 July
4	(Hungary) Hungaroring, Mogyoród	31 July	1 August
5	(Belgium) Circuit de Spa-Francorchamps, Stavelot	28 August	29 August
6	(Netherlands) Circuit Zandvoort, Zandvoort	4 September	5 September
7	(Russia) Sochi Autodrom, Sochi	24–25 September	26 September

=== Calendar changes ===
As a consequence of cost-cutting measures, the Formula 2 and Formula 3 championships will adopt a new format. The two championships will alternate between Grands Prix meetings and will no longer appear together on the support race bill. Although this will reduce the number of rounds, both championships will run three races at a Grand Prix instead of two. The format change was designed to cut costs for teams competing in both championships by allowing them to rotate staff between each championship.

As the 2020 championship was disrupted by the COVID-19 pandemic, the 2021 calendar featured substantial revisions:

- The round at Mugello Circuit and the extra rounds at the Red Bull Ring and Silverstone Circuit supporting the Styrian and 70th Anniversary Grands Prix respectively were removed from the schedule as these rounds were run in support of one-off Grands Prix.
- The Silverstone and Monza rounds, which supported the British and Italian Grands Prix respectively, were removed from the schedule to make way for the new weekend format.
- The Paul Ricard round returned to the championship. It was originally timetabled for 26–27 June, but took place a week earlier due to the rescheduling of the French Grand Prix.
- The Circuit Zandvoort made its début in 2021. The circuit had been included on the 2020 calendar, but was removed from the schedule in response to the COVID-19 pandemic.

The last race of the championship was set to take place at the Circuit of the Americas on 23–24 October, in what would have been the circuit's début in the series. However, in early September, the round was replaced "following unavoidable logistical changes" with a round at the Sochi Autodrom taking place on 25–26 September.

== Regulation changes ==
=== Sporting changes ===
The weekend format was changed with two races held on Saturday and one race on Sunday. The qualifying determined the grid of the Sunday race and the first Saturday race, which will also see the top twelve drivers from Qualifying have their grid positions reversed. The grid of the second race was formed by results of the first Saturday race, with top twelve finishers reversed. The addition of a third race to the weekend meant that teams were provided with an extra set of tyres.

== Season report ==
=== Round 1: Spain ===
The season began at the Circuit de Barcelona-Catalunya, with Dennis Hauger setting the fastest time in qualifying and hence taking pole position for Race 3. Jonny Edgar qualified 12th, giving him reverse-grid pole position for Race 1. Aleksandr Smolyar passed Edgar early in the race, which later ended under safety car conditions after Oliver Rasmussen went off-track and became stuck in the gravel. This allowed Smolyar to claim his first FIA Formula 3 victory.

Enzo Fittipaldi started from pole position in Race 2 by virtue of finishing Race 1 in 12th place. Race 1 winner Smolyar and Logan Sargeant were eliminated on the first lap after colliding with each other and spinning into the gravel. On lap 12 of 22, David Schumacher passed Fittipaldi for the lead of the race, however both drivers were eliminated three laps later when Fittipaldi attempted to reclaim the lead and the two collided. The lead now passed to Matteo Nannini. On the penultimate lap, Hauger attempted to pass Nannini and the two made contact, breaking Hauger's front wing and causing Nannini to spin. Olli Caldwell, who started the race in seventh place, crossed the finish line to take his maiden FIA Formula 3 victory.

Hauger led the entirety of Race 3 to take his first FIA Formula 3 race win ahead of Jack Doohan and Nannini. This result allowed Hauger to claim the lead of the championship after Round 1, two points ahead of teammate Caldwell.

=== Round 2: France ===
The season resumed at the Circuit Paul Ricard. Frederik Vesti took pole position in qualifying for Race 3, while Calan Williams qualified 12th to start on pole for Race 1. The first race featured five drivers – Williams, Logan Sargeant, Ayumu Iwasa, Aleksandr Smolyar and Victor Martins – trading the lead of the race. Iwasa was later penalised for taking the lead whilst off the track. On the final lap, Martins – who had made his way into the lead after starting 10th – was overtaken by Smolyar, who took his second race victory in four races. After starting from 30th place after breaking his suspension in qualifying, Arthur Leclerc progressed to 12th place in the race, earning himself pole position for Race 2.

Leclerc maintained his lead for the entirety of Race 2 to claim his first victory, and first points finish, in FIA Formula 3. Jak Crawford, who started the race alongside Leclerc on the front row, stalled his car at the race start and eventually finished 14th. Leclerc's teammate Dennis Hauger finished second and Martins climbed from 11th on the grid to pass Olli Caldwell on the penultimate lap for third place.

Race 3 took place in wet conditions. Hauger took the lead from polesitter Vesti at the race start, who would gradually drop back to sixth by the end of the race. Hauger held the lead until lap 15 of 20 when Jack Doohan, who had made his way up from fifth place, overtook him. Doohan crossed the finish line to take his first FIA Formula 3 victory, followed by Hauger and Caio Collet. At the conclusion of the round, Hauger held the lead of the championship by six points over Martins, with Doohan a further two points adrift in third place.

=== Round 3: Austria ===
Caio Collet initially set the fastest time in qualifying at the Red Bull Ring, however Dennis Hauger was awarded Race 3 pole position after Collet's time was deleted for exceeding track limits. Logan Sargeant took reverse-grid pole position for Race 1. Sargeant, Matteo Nannini and Clément Novalak spent the race exchanging the lead, before Nannini and Novalak collided with three laps remaining. This allowed Hauger, who had progressed to third place after starting 12th, to take his second victory of the season ahead of teammate Olli Caldwell with Sargeant third. After the race, eleven drivers in total were penalised, with most penalties issued for violating track limits at turns nine and ten. This promoted Jack Doohan to third place.

After all penalties from Race 1 were applied, David Schumacher took reverse-grid pole position for Race 2. The race was interrupted by safety car periods after collisions between Logan Sargeant and Tijmen van der Helm and later Juan Manuel Correa and Kaylen Frederick, with the latter collision leaving Frederick with a fractured thumb. Schumacher held the lead for the entire race distance to claim his first FIA Formula 3 victory and points finish. Second place had been traded between Jak Crawford, Victor Martins and Roman Staněk, however Crawford and Martins both retired with apparent mechanical issues and the podium was completed by Frederik Vesti and Hauger. Arthur Leclerc claimed the fastest lap and finished sixth, having started the race in 27th place.

Vesti took the lead of Race 3 from pole-sitter Hauger on lap five of 24, and Aleksandr Smolyar briefly claimed the lead before it was retaken by Vesti. On lap 15, Leclerc took to the grass whilst attempting to overtake Martins, losing control of his car and causing a heavy accident that also eliminated Novalak from the race. The safety car was deployed as a result. Vesti held his lead to take his first race win of the season, followed by Hauger in second place and Caldwell in third. Having taken a podium finish at all three races, Hauger extended his championship lead, 41 points ahead of Vesti in second place.

=== Round 4: Hungary ===
Arthur Leclerc took Race 3 pole in qualifying at the Hungaroring. Jonny Edgar qualified 12th making him the pole-sitter for Race 1. Edgar held the lead of Race 1 until lap eight, when he was overtaken by Lorenzo Colombo. Edgar retired with a mechanical issue shortly after. The safety car was later deployed after Frederik Vesti's car stopped with mechanical problems. Colombo maintained his lead and crossed the finish line in first place, however he was later judged to have fallen more than ten car lengths behind the safety car. The resulting five-second penalty dropped him to seventh place and allowed Ayumu Iwasa to take his first FIA Formula 3 victory. Logan Sargeant was elevated to third place, claiming Charouz Racing System's first FIA Formula 3 podium finish.

Enzo Fittipaldi started Race 2 in pole position. Matteo Nannini, who started third, passed second-placed Roman Staněk at the first corner and later overtook Fittipaldi for the lead. Fittipaldi claimed another podium finish for Charouz Racing System and Staněk took his first podium of the season.

Race 3 took place in wet conditions. Pole-sitter Leclerc battled for the lead with, and was eventually passed by, teammate Dennis Hauger. The race ended under the safety car after a collision involving Rafael Villagómez, Ido Cohen and László Tóth left the latter two stranded on track. After claiming his third race win of the season, Hauger now held a 63-point advantage in the championship over second-placed Jack Doohan.

=== Round 5: Belgium ===
The qualifying session and all three races at Spa-Francorchamps took place in wet conditions. Jack Doohan claimed Race 3 pole position in qualifying and Lorenzo Colombo was the pole-sitter for Race 1. A multi-car battle in Race 1 for fourth place saw Caio Collet penalised for overtaking off-track. Colombo led the entirety of the race and finished over thirteen seconds ahead of second-placed Jak Crawford to claim Campos' first FIA Formula 3 race victory.

Doohan started Race 2 from pole position. The race was interrupted by a safety car in order to collect Matteo Nannini's car, which was stranded on track after a spin. The race later ended under safety car conditions after a collision at the Raidillon curve involving Amaury Cordeel and Calan Williams. Trident took a 1-2 finish with Doohan winning the race ahead of David Schumacher.

Pole-sitter Doohan and Victor Martins competed for the lead during Race 3. Martins briefly claimed the lead from Doohan, but later relinquished the position as his overtaking move was completed off-track. Doohan led the rest of the race to claim a second consecutive win. Championship leader Dennis Hauger had qualified only 14th and collected six points from the three races. This allowed Doohan to close the gap between them in the championship from 63 to 25 points by the end of the round.

=== Round 6: Netherlands ===
Dennis Hauger set the fastest time in qualifying to claim his third Race 3 pole position of the season. Amaury Cordeel began Race 1 as pole-sitter. Arthur Leclerc, who started the race in third place, took the lead at the first corner. Shortly after, Cordeel and Aleksandr Smolyar collided, causing Cordeel to spin and fall the back of the field. The race was interrupted by a safety car period after an accident involving Johnathan Hoggard and Hunter Yeany, and Leclerc held the lead of the race from Logan Sargeant at the restart to take his second victory of the season.

Ido Cohen started on pole position for Race 2. Clément Novalak took the lead of the race from Cohen at the first corner. Victor Martins, who started fifth, gained places to eventually pass Novalak for the lead with nine laps remaining. The safety car was deployed late into the race when Cordeel spun into the gravel and could not resume, and the race was restarted with two laps remaining. Championship contenders Hauger and Jack Doohan failed to score points due to incidents at the restart; Hauger and Cohen made contact whilst competing for fourth place which ended the races of both drivers, and eighth-placed Doohan ran wide into the gravel on the final lap. Martins held his lead to take his first FIA Formula 3 race victory.

Hauger took a lights-to-flag victory in the final race of the weekend, extending his advantage in the championship over Doohan, who finished fourth, to 43 points. Novalak took another second-place finish after a Lap 22 collision between David Schumacher and Martins, who were fighting for second, eliminated Schumacher from the race and left Martins with a 10-second penalty. The penalty demoted Martins from third to tenth, so Smolyar took his place on the podium.

=== Round 7: Russia ===
Jack Doohan secured pole position for Race 3 and four points in qualifying, though transponder issues meant teammate Clément Novalak was erroneously awarded pole position at first. It was announced during that session that Race 1 had been moved to Friday afternoon because of concerns over inclement weather on Saturday morning. Victor Martins started that race from the front, but Logan Sargeant took the lead into Turn 2, which he never relinquished despite late pressure from Dennis Hauger, allowing Sargeant to claim Charouz Racing System's first FIA Formula 3 race victory. Starting fourth, Hauger worked his way up to second after passing Jak Crawford and Martins. With title rival Doohan failing to score, Hauger had enough points to secure the championship title with two races to spare.

Race 2 was set to run on Saturday afternoon with Johnathan Hoggard on pole position, but the race was cancelled due to adverse weather conditions.

With the track dry and the skies clear by Sunday, regular running resumed, and Doohan held on to take victory in Race 3, albeit under controversial circumstances. Doohan led much of the race from Novalak and Frederik Vesti, but Novalak was setting faster times than his teammate. Trident ordered Doohan to relinquish the lead to Novalak, which he refused to do, saying after the race concluded that he was "racing for [his] own career." Doohan and Novalak briefly exchanged positions in an on-track battle on Lap 17, which allowed Vesti to close in and overtake Novalak for second the following lap. This, of course, was crucial in the battle for the teams' championship between Trident and Prema Racing. Coming into the race, Trident were 27 points behind, but Hauger, the lead Prema at the beginning of Race 3, fell out of the points after a collision with Oliver Rasmussen on Lap 7. With the other Premas of Arthur Leclerc and Olli Caldwell only finishing seventh and tenth, Trident's 40-point haul—despite the intra-team conflict—was enough to secure them their first teams' championship in the series. The exact gap between the teams, however, was only decided after the race. Hauger had set the original fastest lap of the race, but the time was voided post-race as it was deemed that he had deliberately pitted to set the fastest lap. Fortunately for Prema, the failed ploy actually worked out in their benefit: the fastest lap instead went to Leclerc, who took with it the extra two points. The final result in the constructors' championship was 381 points for Trident and 377 for Prema.

== Results and standings ==
=== Season summary ===
Round		Circuit	Pole position	Fastest lap	Winning driver	Winning team	Report
1	R1	(Spain) Circuit de Barcelona-Catalunya		(Russia) Alexander Smolyar	(Russia) Alexander Smolyar	(France) ART Grand Prix	Report
1	R2	(Spain) Circuit de Barcelona-Catalunya		(Norway) Dennis Hauger	(United Kingdom) Olli Caldwell	(Italy) Prema Racing	Report
1	R3	(Spain) Circuit de Barcelona-Catalunya	(Norway) Dennis Hauger	(Norway) Dennis Hauger	(Norway) Dennis Hauger	(Italy) Prema Racing	Report
2	R1	(France) Circuit Paul Ricard		(Australia) Jack Doohan	(Russia) Alexander Smolyar	(France) ART Grand Prix	Report
2	R2	(France) Circuit Paul Ricard		(France) Victor Martins	(Monaco) Arthur Leclerc	(Italy) Prema Racing	Report
2	R3	(France) Circuit Paul Ricard	(Denmark) Frederik Vesti	(France) Reshad de Gerus	(Australia) Jack Doohan	(Italy) Trident	Report
3	R1	(Austria) Red Bull Ring		(Norway) Dennis Hauger	(Norway) Dennis Hauger	(Italy) Prema Racing	Report
3	R2	(Austria) Red Bull Ring		(Monaco) Arthur Leclerc	(Germany) David Schumacher	(Italy) Trident	Report
3	R3	(Austria) Red Bull Ring	(Norway) Dennis Hauger	(France) Victor Martins	(Denmark) Frederik Vesti	(France) ART Grand Prix	Report
4	R1	(Hungary) Hungaroring		(Italy) Lorenzo Colombo	(Japan) Ayumu Iwasa	(United Kingdom) Hitech Grand Prix	Report
4	R2	(Hungary) Hungaroring		(United Kingdom) Olli Caldwell	(Italy) Matteo Nannini	(Germany) HWA Racelab	Report
4	R3	(Hungary) Hungaroring	(Monaco) Arthur Leclerc	(Italy) Matteo Nannini	(Norway) Dennis Hauger	(Italy) Prema Racing	Report
5	R1	(Belgium) Circuit de Spa-Francorchamps		(Italy) Lorenzo Colombo	(Italy) Lorenzo Colombo	(Spain) Campos Racing	Report
5	R2	(Belgium) Circuit de Spa-Francorchamps		(France) Clément Novalak	(Australia) Jack Doohan	(Italy) Trident	Report
5	R3	(Belgium) Circuit de Spa-Francorchamps	(Australia) Jack Doohan	(France) Victor Martins	(Australia) Jack Doohan	(Italy) Trident	Report
6	R1	(Netherlands) Circuit Zandvoort		(Russia) Alexander Smolyar	(Monaco) Arthur Leclerc	(Italy) Prema Racing	Report
6	R2	(Netherlands) Circuit Zandvoort		(France) Victor Martins	(France) Victor Martins	(Netherlands) MP Motorsport	Report
6	R3	(Netherlands) Circuit Zandvoort	(Norway) Dennis Hauger	(Norway) Dennis Hauger	(Norway) Dennis Hauger	(Italy) Prema Racing	Report
7	R1	(Russia) Sochi Autodrom		(France) Clément Novalak	(United States) Logan Sargeant	(Czech Republic) Charouz Racing System	Report
7	R2	(Russia) Sochi Autodrom		Race cancelled			Report
7	R3	(Russia) Sochi Autodrom	(Australia) Jack Doohan	(Monaco) Arthur Leclerc	(Australia) Jack Doohan	(Italy) Trident	Report

=== Scoring system ===
Points were awarded to the top ten classified finishers in all 3 races. The pole-sitter in Race 3 also received four points, and two points were given to the driver who set the fastest lap inside the top ten in all 3 races. No extra points were awarded to the pole-sitter in Race 1 or Race 2 as the grid for Race 1 was set by reversing the top twelve qualifiers and the grid for Race 2 was based on the results of the first race reversed from the top twelve.

Race 1 and 2 points

Points were awarded to the top 10 classified finishers. Two points were awarded to the driver who set the fastest lap if he finishes in the top 10. No fastest lap points were awarded if it was set by a driver outside the top 10.

Position	**1st**	**2nd**	**3rd**	**4th**	**5th**	**6th**	**7th**	**8th**	**9th**	**10th**	**FL**
Points	15	12	10	8	6	5	4	3	2	1	2

Race 3 points

Points were awarded to the top ten classified finishers. Bonus points were awarded to the pole-sitter and to the driver who set the fastest lap and finished in the top ten.

Position	**1st**	**2nd**	**3rd**	**4th**	**5th**	**6th**	**7th**	**8th**	**9th**	**10th**	**Pole**	**FL**
Points	25	18	15	12	10	8	6	4	2	1	4	2

=== Drivers' championship ===
Pos.	Driver	CAT (Spain)			LEC (France)			RBR (Austria)			HUN (Hungary)			SPA (Belgium)			ZAN (Netherlands)			SOC (Russia)			Points
Pos.	Driver	R1	R2	R3	R1	R2	R3	R1	R2	R3	R1	R2	R3	R1	R2	R3	R1	R2	R3	R1	R2	R3	Points
1	(Norway) Dennis Hauger	8	25	**1**	9	2	2	1	3	**2**	5	5	1	14	9	8	7	27†	**1**	2	C	24	205
2	(Australia) Jack Doohan	17	8	2	7	5	1	3	7	27	9	13	3	12	1	**1**	6	18	4	15	C	**1**	179
3	(France) Clément Novalak	2	4	6	5	6	5	Ret	13	Ret	4	8	5	7	5	5	11	2	2	4	C	3	147
4	(Denmark) Frederik Vesti	7	3	7	15	10	**6**	7	2	1	Ret	16	7	4	6	6	9	3	8	8	C	2	138
5	(France) Victor Martins	9	2	5	2	3	4	5	26†	24	15	25	27	5	7	2	8	1	10	3	C	8	131
6	(Russia) Alexander Smolyar	1	Ret	11	1	7	8	14	25	4	6	4	6	10	8	3	24	14	3	22	C	23	107
7	(United States) Logan Sargeant	4	Ret	9	4	12	Ret	15	Ret	8	3	9	10	8	3	7	2	10	6	1	C	4	102
8	(United Kingdom) Olli Caldwell	6	1	4	10	4	Ret	2	9	3	2	29	8	16	15	11	10	6	14	17	C	10	93
9	(Brazil) Caio Collet	3	5	8	13	Ret	3	17	17	7	20	12	16	9	4	4	5	4	5	5	C	Ret	93
10	(Monaco) Arthur Leclerc	28	24	13	12	1	13	Ret	6	Ret	13	11	**2**	13	10	10	1	7	9	7	C	7	79
11	(Germany) David Schumacher	11	Ret	12	16	11	27	12	1	11	8	6	4	11	2	9	14	5	30†	14	C	15	55
12	(Japan) Ayumu Iwasa	14	7	15	8	9	7	DSQ	14	6	1	10	12	15	11	13	3	Ret	11	10	C	9	52
13	(United States) Jak Crawford	13	9	18	11	14	10	8	Ret	26	26	20	15	2	12	12	4	8	7	11	C	5	45
14	(Italy) Matteo Nannini	10	26†	3	22	13	20	23	12	5	10	1	25	19	Ret	26	17	9	28	16	C	17	44
15	(Italy) Lorenzo Colombo	23	22	29	14	20	19	25	19	13	7	7	11	1	14	14	13	Ret	17	6	C	Ret	32
16	(Czech Republic) Roman Staněk	16	12	10	26	19	15	11	4	12	11	3	23	3	13	15	27	15	13	13	C	26	29
17	(Brazil) Enzo Fittipaldi	12	Ret	19	21	17	11	4	8	15	12	2	9										25
18	(United Kingdom) Jonny Edgar	5	6	16	28	23	14	6	5	10	Ret	26	Ret	21	17	19	19	25	15	18	C	14	23
19	(Australia) Calan Williams	18	11	21	3	8	12	16	15	9	17	24	17	24	Ret	18	16	22	18	19	C	12	15
20	(United Kingdom) Johnathan Hoggard				Ret	26	18	18	10	25	22	22	18	6	24	16	Ret	19	20	12	C	6	14
21	(United States) Juan Manuel Correa	15	10	14	6	16	9	10	24	14	14	14	14	22	18	21	28	17	27	9	C	11	11
22	(United States) Kaylen Frederick	22	17	30	20	22	17	9	Ret	DNS							20	11	21	23	C	13	2
23	(Belgium) Amaury Cordeel	26	16	25	27	24	25	22	11	18	19	Ret	26	17	Ret	Ret	23	Ret	12	21	C	16	0
24	(Israel) Ido Cohen	29	20	22	24	Ret	24	Ret	20	16	28†	27	Ret	Ret	20	20	12	26†	16	27	C	Ret	0
25	(Denmark) Oliver Rasmussen	Ret	19	17	17	21	22	26	16	22	18	28	21	20	21	17	18	12	26	Ret	C	25†	0
26	(Netherlands) Tijmen van der Helm	21	15	20	29	18	16	13	Ret	20	21	15	19	23	16	22	21	21	29†	Ret	C	18	0
27	(United Kingdom) Jake Hughes										16	17	13										0
28	(France) Reshad de Gerus	20	13	23	19	25	21	20	23	17	24	18	20										0
29	(Mexico) Rafael Villagómez	19	18	28	25	27	23	21	18	19	23	21	24	27	23	Ret	22	13	25	20	C	Ret	0
30	(France) Pierre-Louis Chovet	24	14	24	18	25	28†																0
31	(Romania) Filip Ugran	25	21	27	23	28	26	24	22	23	25	19	22	28†	19	25	15	24	19	25	C	19	0
32	(Hungary) László Tóth	27	23	26				19	21	21	27	23	Ret	25	22	23	25	16	24	Ret	C	22	0
33	(United States) Hunter Yeany													18	25	NC	Ret	23	22				0
34	(Portugal) Zdeněk Chovanec													26	26	24	26	20	23	26	C	20	0
35	(United Kingdom) Ayrton Simmons																			24	C	21	0
Pos.	Driver	R1	R2	R3	R1	R2	R3	R1	R2	R3	R1	R2	R3	R1	R2	R3	R1	R2	R3	R1	R2	R3	Points
Pos.	Driver	CAT (Spain)			LEC (France)			RBR (Austria)			HUN (Hungary)			SPA (Belgium)			ZAN (Netherlands)			SOC (Russia)			Points

Key
Colour	Result
Gold	Winner
Silver	Second place
Bronze	Third place
Green	Other points position
Blue	Other classified position
Blue	Not classified, finished (NC)
Purple	Not classified, retired (Ret)
Red	Did not qualify (DNQ)
Red	Did not pre-qualify (DNPQ)
Black	Disqualified (DSQ)
White	Did not start (DNS)
White	Race cancelled (C)
Blank	Did not practice (DNP)
Blank	Excluded (EX)
Blank	Did not arrive (DNA)
Blank	Withdrawn (WD)
Blank	Did not enter (cell empty)
Text formatting	Meaning
**Bold**	Pole position
Italics	Fastest lap

Notes:

- † – Drivers did not finish the race, but were classified as they completed more than 90% of the race distance.

=== Teams' championship ===
Pos.	Team	CAT (Spain)			LEC (France)			RBR (Austria)			HUN (Hungary)			SPA (Belgium)			ZAN (Netherlands)			SOC (Russia)			Points
Pos.	Team	R1	R2	R3	R1	R2	R3	R1	R2	R3	R1	R2	R3	R1	R2	R3	R1	R2	R3	R1	R2	R3	Points
1	(Italy) Trident	2	4	2	5	5	1	3	1	11	4	6	3	7	1	**1**	6	2	2	4	C	**1**	381
1	(Italy) Trident	11	8	6	7	6	5	12	7	27	8	8	4	11	2	5	11	5	4	14	C	3	381
1	(Italy) Trident	17	Ret	12	16	11	27	Ret	13	Ret	9	13	5	12	5	9	14	18	30†	15	C	15	381
2	(Italy) Prema Racing	6	1	**1**	9	1	2	1	3	**2**	2	5	1	13	9	8	1	6	**1**	2	C	7	377
2	(Italy) Prema Racing	8	24	4	10	2	13	2	6	3	5	11	**2**	14	10	10	7	7	9	7	C	10	377
2	(Italy) Prema Racing	28	25	13	12	4	Ret	Ret	9	Ret	13	29	8	16	15	11	10	27†	14	17	C	24	377
3	(France) ART Grand Prix	1	3	7	1	7	**6**	7	2	1	6	4	6	4	6	3	9	3	3	8	C	2	256
3	(France) ART Grand Prix	7	10	11	6	10	8	10	24	4	14	14	7	10	8	6	24	14	8	9	C	11	256
3	(France) ART Grand Prix	15	Ret	14	15	16	9	14	25	14	Ret	16	14	22	18	21	28	17	27	22	C	23	256
4	(Netherlands) MP Motorsport	3	2	5	2	3	3	5	17	7	15	12	16	5	4	2	5	1	5	3	C	8	224
4	(Netherlands) MP Motorsport	9	5	8	13	18	4	13	26†	20	20	15	19	9	7	4	8	4	10	5	C	18	224
4	(Netherlands) MP Motorsport	21	15	20	29	Ret	16	17	Ret	24	21	25	27	23	16	22	21	21	29†	Ret	C	Ret	224
5	(Czech Republic) Charouz Racing System	4	13	9	4	12	11	4	8	8	3	2	9	8	3	7	2	10	6	1	C	4	127
5	(Czech Republic) Charouz Racing System	12	Ret	19	19	17	21	15	23	15	12	9	10	18	25	24	26	20	22	24	C	20	127
5	(Czech Republic) Charouz Racing System	20	Ret	23	21	25	Ret	20	Ret	17	24	18	20	26	26	NC	Ret	23	23	26	C	21	127
6	(United Kingdom) Hitech Grand Prix	13	7	10	8	9	7	8	4	6	1	3	12	2	11	12	3	8	7	10	C	5	126
6	(United Kingdom) Hitech Grand Prix	14	9	15	11	14	10	11	14	12	11	10	15	3	12	13	4	15	11	11	C	9	126
6	(United Kingdom) Hitech Grand Prix	16	12	18	26	19	15	DSQ	Ret	26	26	21	24	15	13	15	27	Ret	13	13	C	26	126
7	(Germany) HWA Racelab	10	18	3	17	13	20	21	12	5	10	1	21	19	21	17	17	9	25	16	C	17	44
7	(Germany) HWA Racelab	19	19	17	22	21	22	23	16	19	18	22	23	20	23	26	18	12	26	20	C	25†	44
7	(Germany) HWA Racelab	Ret	26†	28	25	27	23	26	18	22	23	28	25	27	Ret	Ret	22	13	28	Ret	C	Ret	44
8	(Spain) Campos Racing	23	16	25	14	15	19	19	11	13	7	7	11	1	14	14	13	16	12	6	C	16	32
8	(Spain) Campos Racing	26	22	26	18	20	25	22	19	18	19	23	26	17	22	23	23	Ret	17	21	C	22	32
8	(Spain) Campos Racing	27	23	29	27	24	28†	25	21	21	27	Ret	Ret	25	Ret	Ret	25	Ret	24	Ret	C	Ret	32
9	(Switzerland) Jenzer Motorsport	18	11	21	3	8	12	16	10	9	17	19	17	6	19	16	15	19	18	12	C	6	29
9	(Switzerland) Jenzer Motorsport	24	14	24	23	26	18	18	15	23	22	20	18	24	24	18	16	22	19	19	C	12	29
9	(Switzerland) Jenzer Motorsport	25	21	27	Ret	28	26	24	22	25	25	24	22	28†	Ret	25	Ret	24	20	25	C	19	29
10	(United Kingdom) Carlin Buzz Racing	5	6	16	20	22	14	6	5	10	16	17	13	21	17	19	12	11	15	18	C	13	25
10	(United Kingdom) Carlin Buzz Racing	22	17	22	24	23	17	9	20	16	28†	26	Ret	Ret	20	20	19	25	16	23	C	14	25
10	(United Kingdom) Carlin Buzz Racing	29	20	30	28	Ret	24	Ret	Ret	DNS	Ret	27	Ret				20	26†	21	27	C	Ret	25
Pos.	Team	R1	R2	R3	R1	R2	R3	R1	R2	R3	R1	R2	R3	R1	R2	R3	R1	R2	R3	R1	R2	R3	Points
Pos.	Team	CAT (Spain)			LEC (France)			RBR (Austria)			HUN (Hungary)			SPA (Belgium)			ZAN (Netherlands)			SOC (Russia)			Points

Key
Colour	Result
Gold	Winner
Silver	2nd place
Bronze	3rd place
Green	Other points position
Blue	Other classified position
Blue	Not classified, finished (NC)
Purple	Not classified, retired (Ret)
Red	Did not qualify (DNQ)
Red	Did not pre-qualify (DNPQ)
Black	Disqualified (DSQ)
White	Did not start (DNS)
White	Race cancelled (C)
Blank	Did not practice (DNP)
Blank	Excluded (EX)
Blank	Did not arrive (DNA)
Blank	Withdrawn (WD)
Text formatting	Meaning
**Bold**	Pole position point(s)
Italics	Fastest lap point(s)

Notes:

- † – Drivers did not finish the race, but were classified as they completed more than 90% of the race distance.
