= 2022 FIA Formula 3 Championship =

Motor racing championship held in 2022

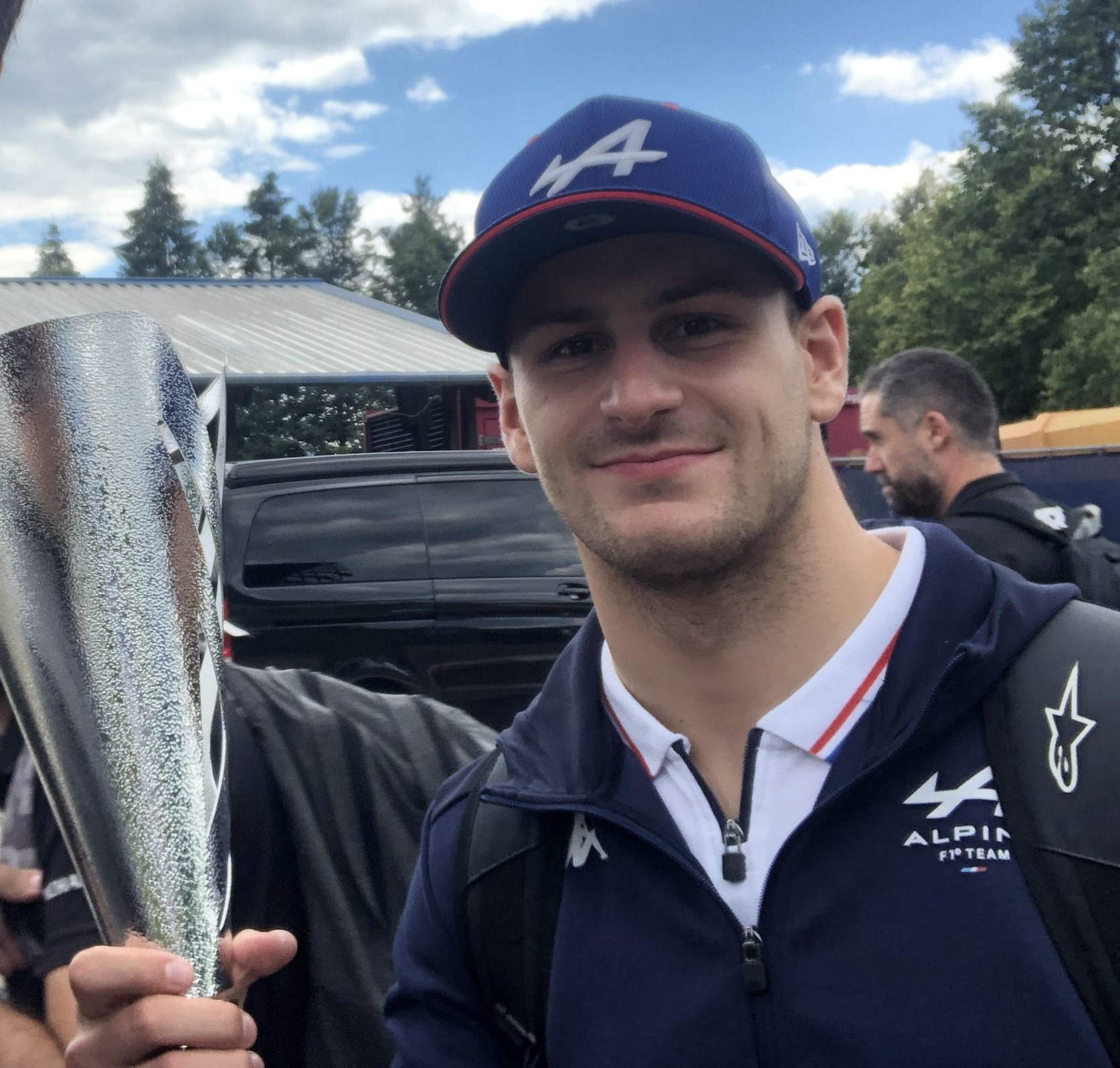
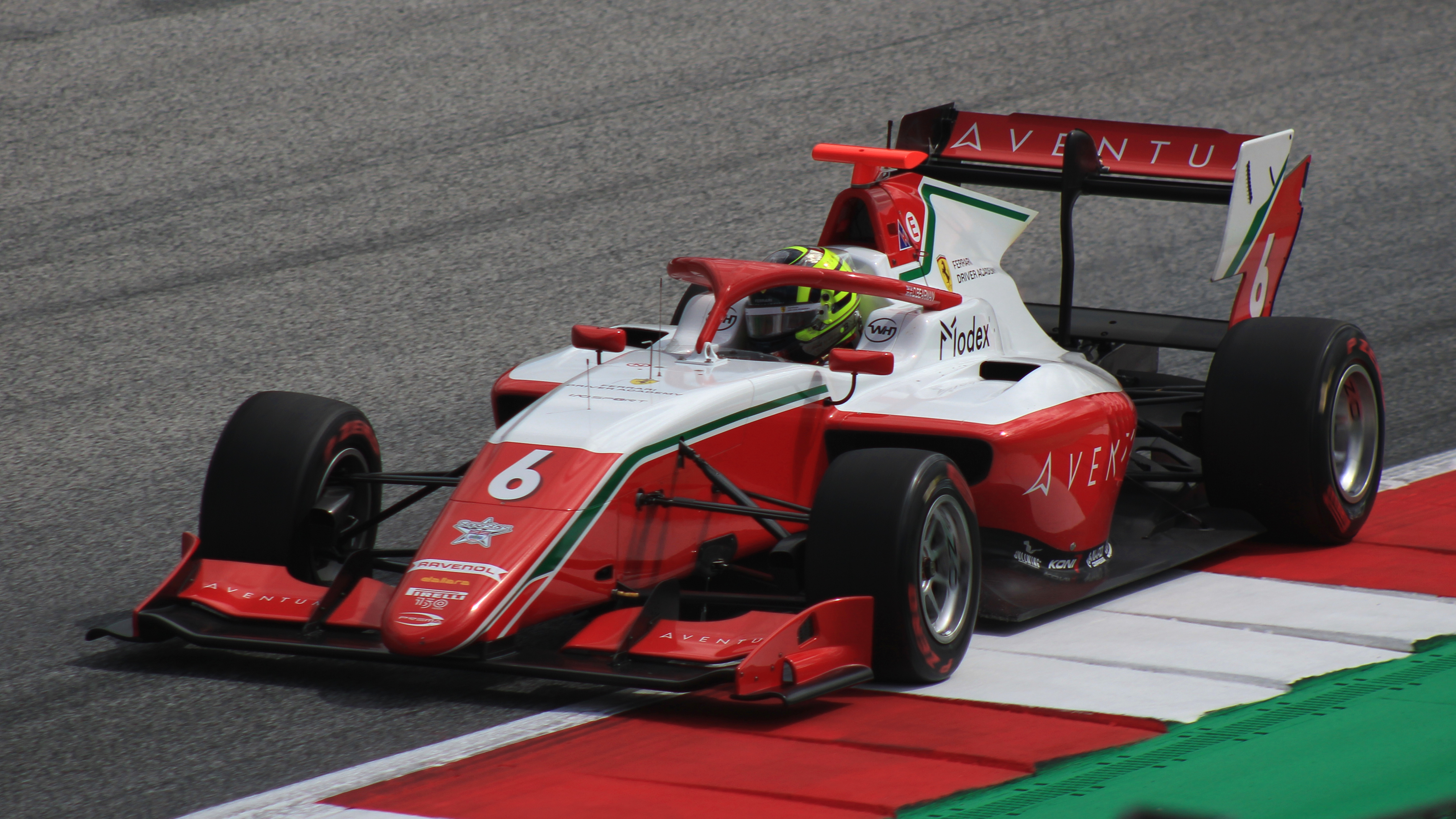
Victor Martins (left), driving for ART Grand Prix, was the FIA Formula 3 Drivers' Champion. Prema Racing (right) won their third Teams' Championship.

The 2022 FIA Formula 3 Championship was a motor racing championship for Formula 3 cars that was sanctioned by the Fédération Internationale de l'Automobile (FIA). The championship was the thirteenth season of Formula 3 racing and the fourth season run under the FIA Formula 3 Championship moniker. It was an open-wheel racing category that served as the third tier of formula racing in the FIA Global Pathway. The category was run in support of selected rounds of the 2022 FIA Formula One World Championship.

Trident entered the championship as the reigning teams' champion, having secured their title at the last race of the 2021 season. In 2022 however, they were bested by Prema Racing, who won their third teams' championship.

Victor Martins, driving for ART Grand Prix, won the drivers' championship, ahead of Zane Maloney (Trident) and Oliver Bearman (Prema).

== Entries ==
As the championship was a spec series, all teams and drivers that competed in the championship ran the same car, the Dallara F3 2019. For the 2022 season, a new chassis was to be introduced, but this change had been halted by the cost-cutting measures introduced because of the COVID-19 pandemic.

Teams	No.	Driver	Rounds
(Italy) Trident	1	(United Kingdom) Jonny Edgar	1, 4–9
(Italy) Trident	1	(Denmark) Oliver Rasmussen	2–3
(Italy) Trident	2	(Czech Republic) Roman Staněk	All
(Italy) Trident	3	(Barbados) Zane Maloney	All
(Italy) Prema Racing	4	(Monaco) Arthur Leclerc	All
(Italy) Prema Racing	5	(United States) Jak Crawford	All
(Italy) Prema Racing	6	(United Kingdom) Oliver Bearman	All
(France) ART Grand Prix	7	(France) Victor Martins	All
(France) ART Grand Prix	8	(Switzerland) Grégoire Saucy	All
(France) ART Grand Prix	9	(United States) Juan Manuel Correa	1, 3–9
(Netherlands) MP Motorsport	10	(Brazil) Caio Collet	All
(Netherlands) MP Motorsport	11	Alexander Smolyar (Note: Alexander Smolyar is Russian, but he competed as a neutral competitor as Russian national emblems were banned by the FIA due to the Russian invasion of Ukraine.)	1–3, 5–9
(Netherlands) MP Motorsport	11	(Romania) Filip Ugran	4
(Netherlands) MP Motorsport	12	(India) Kush Maini	All
(Czech Republic) Charouz Racing System	14	(Hungary) László Tóth	All
(Czech Republic) Charouz Racing System	15	(United Kingdom) Ayrton Simmons	1
(Czech Republic) Charouz Racing System	15	(Germany) David Schumacher	2, 8
(Czech Republic) Charouz Racing System	15	(Germany) Lirim Zendeli	3
(Czech Republic) Charouz Racing System	15	(Portugal) Zdeněk Chovanec (Note: Chovanec was a Czech-Venezuelan-Portuguese driver competing under a Portuguese licence.)	4–5
(Czech Republic) Charouz Racing System	15	(United Kingdom) Christian Mansell (Note: Mansell is an Australian driver competing under a British licence.)	6–7
(Czech Republic) Charouz Racing System	15	(Italy) Alessandro Famularo (Note: Famularo is a Venezuelan driver competing under an Italian licence.)	9
(Czech Republic) Charouz Racing System	16	(Italy) Francesco Pizzi	All
(United Kingdom) Hitech Grand Prix	17	(United States) Kaylen Frederick	All
(United Kingdom) Hitech Grand Prix	18	(France) Isack Hadjar	All
(United Kingdom) Hitech Grand Prix	19	(Malaysia) Nazim Azman	All
(Spain) Campos Racing	20	(Spain) David Vidales	All
(Spain) Campos Racing	21	(United States) Hunter Yeany	1–5, 9
(Spain) Campos Racing	21	(Monaco) Oliver Goethe (Note: Goethe is a Danish-German-British driver competing under a Monegasque licence.)	6–7
(Spain) Campos Racing	21	(Colombia) Sebastián Montoya	8
(Spain) Campos Racing	22	(Spain) Pepe Martí	All
(Switzerland) Jenzer Motorsport	23	(Israel) Ido Cohen	All
(Switzerland) Jenzer Motorsport	24	(Finland) Niko Kari	1
(Switzerland) Jenzer Motorsport	24	(Italy) Federico Malvestiti	2–9
(Switzerland) Jenzer Motorsport	25	(Finland) William Alatalo	All
(United Kingdom) Carlin	26	(United Kingdom) Zak O'Sullivan	All
(United Kingdom) Carlin	27	(United States) Brad Benavides (Note: Benavides is an American-Spanish-Guatemalan driver who competed under a Spanish licence in rounds 1–3 and an American licence in rounds 4–9.)	All
(United Kingdom) Carlin	28	(Italy) Enzo Trulli	All
(Netherlands) Van Amersfoort Racing	29	(Argentina) Franco Colapinto	All
(Netherlands) Van Amersfoort Racing	30	(Mexico) Rafael Villagómez	All
(Netherlands) Van Amersfoort Racing	31	(United Kingdom) Reece Ushijima (Note: Ushijima is a Japanese-American driver competing under a British licence.)	All

=== Team changes ===
Van Amersfoort Racing joined the series after purchasing HWA Racelab's assets in October 2021.

=== Driver changes ===
2021 teams' champions Trident saw two of its drivers graduate to Formula 2, Jack Doohan and Clément Novalak signing with Virtuosi Racing and MP Motorsport respectively. They were replaced by Red Bull Junior Jonny Edgar, who moved from Carlin after achieving 18th in the 2021 season, and 2019 British F4 champion Zane Maloney, who came 4th in the 2021 Formula Regional European Championship. David Schumacher moved to DTM and was replaced by Roman Staněk, returning for his third year in the series after driving with Hitech Grand Prix in 2021.

Prema Racing's Dennis Hauger left Formula 3 after winning the championship in 2021 and joined Formula 2 with the team. His seat was taken by Ferrari-backed ADAC and Italian F4 champion Oliver Bearman. Alongside him, Prema signed Jak Crawford, moving over from Hitech Grand Prix to replace Olli Caldwell, who stepped up to Formula 2 with Campos Racing.

ART Grand Prix also promoted one driver to the higher rank, with Frederik Vesti graduating to the outfit's Formula 2 team. His teammate Alexander Smolyar left the team and was replaced by reigning Formula Regional European champion Grégoire Saucy. Vesti's seat was filled by Victor Martins, who moved over from MP Motorsport for his second season.

MP Motorsport signed 2020 BRDC British Formula 3 runner-up Kush Maini to replace Tijmen van der Helm, who moved to endurance racing full-time. Maini was joined by Alexander Smolyar, who switched from ART Grand Prix for his third year in the series, swapping teams with Victor Martins.

Charouz Racing System lined up László Tóth, moving from Campos Racing, with whom he came 32nd in 2021. He replaced Logan Sargeant, who would compete in Formula 2 with Carlin. Tóth was partnered by Francesco Pizzi, graduating from the Formula Regional European Championship, where he came 20th in 2021, and GB3 Championship runner-up Ayrton Simmons, who already competed for the team in the 2021 season finale. They replaced Hunter Yeany, who left for Campos Racing, and Zdeněk Chovanec.

Hitech Grand Prix driver Ayumu Iwasa also graduated to Formula 2 after signing for DAMS. His replacement was new Red Bull Junior Isack Hadjar, fifth place in the Formula Regional European Championship. Jak Crawford and Roman Staněk also left the team, joining Prema Racing and Trident, respectively. They were replaced by Kaylen Frederick, moving over from Carlin, and Nazim Azman, graduating from the Euroformula Open.

Campos Racing fielded an all-new driver lineup as László Tóth moved to Charouz Racing System, Amaury Cordeel joined new team Van Amersfoort Racing in Formula 2 and Lorenzo Colombo left the series after one year to compete in Prema's WEC programme. The team hired Pepe Martí, who raced for Campos' Spanish F4 team in 2021. He was partnered by Hunter Yeany, who switched from Charouz Racing System, and David Vidales, who joined the series after coming tenth in the Formula Regional European Championship.

Jenzer Motorsport drivers Calan Williams and Filip Ugran signed with Trident in Formula 2 and Van Amersfoort Racing in the Euroformula Open, respectively. Williams was replaced by former Carlin driver Ido Cohen. The team also signed Formula Regional European Championship podium finisher William Alatalo, and later announced the return of Niko Kari to the series for the first round of the season.

Carlin saw their three drivers Jonny Edgar, Kaylen Frederick and Ido Cohen move to Trident, Hitech and Jenzer, respectively. The team promoted GB3 champion and new Williams junior Zak O'Sullivan from their GB3 division, and Brad Benavides and 2021 F4 UAE champion Enzo Trulli from their Euroformula Open team.

Van Amersfoort Racing signed Rafael Villagómez, rejoining the team after racing for them in the Euroformula Open and for HWA Racelab in Formula 3 in 2021, as well as rookies Franco Colapinto, a race winner in the Formula Regional European Championship and the European Le Mans Series, and Reece Ushijima, who came fourth in the GB3 Championship.

==== Mid-season changes ====
Multiple driver changes took place for the second round at the Imola Circuit. Trident driver Jonny Edgar pulled out of the championship after being diagnosed with Crohn's disease and was replaced by former HWA Racelab driver Oliver Rasmussen. Federico Malvestiti returned to the championship after a year's absence, replacing Niko Kari at Jenzer Motorsport. Charouz Racing System driver Ayrton Simmons vacated his seat and was replaced by David Schumacher, who previously raced with the team in 2020. ART Grand Prix fielded only two cars at Imola, as Juan Manuel Correa was forced to miss the event due to a foot injury.

Lirim Zendeli returned to the championship, having last competed in 2020, to replace David Schumacher at Charouz Racing System for the third round at the Circuit de Barcelona-Catalunya as Schumacher prioritised competing in the clashing DTM round at the Lausitzring. Juan Manuel Correa returned to his seat at ART Grand Prix after recovering from his injury. Jonny Edgar returned to Trident for the fourth round at Silverstone Circuit after his health improved. Charouz Racing System again changed the driver of their number 15 car, with Lirim Zendeli replaced by Zdeněk Chovanec, who last competed for the team in the final three rounds of 2021. MP Motorsport's Alexander Smolyar was unable to obtain a British visa to attend the Silverstone round and was replaced by Filip Ugran, who last raced in the championship in 2021 with Jenzer Motorsport. Smolyar returned to MP Motorsport for the fifth round at the Red Bull Ring.

Euroformula Open leader Oliver Goethe stood in for Hunter Yeany at Campos Racing for the sixth round at the Hungaroring. Yeany had broken his wrist in an accident at the previous round. Goethe's Euroformula championship rival Christian Mansell became the fifth driver in the Charouz Racing System number 15 car when he replaced Zdeněk Chovanec at the Hungaroring round.

David Schumacher returned to Charouz Racing System for the Zandvoort weekend, replacing Christian Mansell who prioritised his Euroformula Open campaign. Also prioritising Euroformula was Campos Racing's Oliver Goethe. As Hunter Yeany was not yet fully recovered from his injury, the team drafted in Formula Regional European Championship racer Sebastián Montoya.

Both Campos Racing and Charouz Racing System updated their lineups again for the season finale at Monza. Campos' Hunter Yeany returned from injury after a two-month absence as Sebastián Montoya reverted his focus to the Formula Regional European Championship. David Schumacher had to vacate his Charouz seat once more to attend his DTM commitments and was replaced by former FREC racer Alessandro Famularo, who became the sixth different driver to drive the #15 car in just nine rounds.

== Race calendar ==
A provisional nine-round calendar was announced on 15 October 2021:

Round	Circuit	Sprint race	Feature race
1	Bahrain International Circuit, Sakhir	19 March	20 March
2	(Italy) Imola Circuit, Imola	23 April	24 April
3	(Spain) Circuit de Barcelona-Catalunya, Montmeló	21 May	22 May
4	(United Kingdom) Silverstone Circuit, Silverstone	2 July	3 July
5	(Austria) Red Bull Ring, Spielberg	9 July	10 July
6	(Hungary) Hungaroring, Mogyoród	30 July	31 July
7	(Belgium) Circuit de Spa-Francorchamps, Stavelot	27 August	28 August
8	(Netherlands) Circuit Zandvoort, Zandvoort	3 September	4 September
9	(Italy) Monza Circuit, Monza	10 September	11 September

=== Calendar changes ===
After changing the weekend format to three races per weekend in 2021, the format was reverted to more race weekends with two races each in 2022. As in Formula 2, the race weekends featured a sprint race and a feature race, with the latter being longer and worth more points.

- The Bahrain International Circuit featured on the calendar for the first time as the season opener.
- The Imola Circuit also featured on the calendar for the first time.
- The rounds at Silverstone and Monza returned after not featuring in the 2021 season.
- The rounds at Paul Ricard and Sochi were not featured on the calendar after appearing in 2021.

== Regulation changes ==
=== Sporting changes ===
The race weekend format returned to a similar format to the seasons before 2021. On Saturday, only one race was held, with the grid still formed by reversing the top twelve drivers from qualifying, while the Sunday race was started in qualifying order.

The championship scoring format was reprofiled. The points for pole position and fastest lap were each cut in half; now awarding 2 points for pole, and 1 for the fastest lap in each race. The points for the sprint race were changed significantly, with 10 points being awarded for the winner, 9 points for 2nd, then 8 for 3rd, descending all the way to 1 point for 10th. These changes were also applied to Formula 1's other feeder series, the FIA Formula 2 Championship.

== Season report ==
=== Round 1: Bahrain ===
The season began at the Bahrain International Circuit where newcomers Van Amersfoort Racing and rookie driver Franco Colapinto set the fastest time in their first FIA Formula 3 qualifying session, taking pole position for the feature race. Zak O'Sullivan started the sprint race on reverse-grid pole position after qualifying twelfth, but was overtaken in the early laps by Oliver Bearman and eventually dropped to sixth place. Bearman crossed the finish line first but received a five-second time penalty for track limits violations, handing Isack Hadjar the race victory.

Pole-sitter Colapinto held the lead for much of the feature race but was passed by Victor Martins and Arthur Leclerc, who started thirteenth. A track-limits time penalty later dropped Colapinto to fifth place. Martins' victory put him at the top of the drivers' championship standings at the end of the first round, one point ahead of Leclerc.

=== Round 2: Italy (Imola) ===
Zane Maloney set the fastest qualifying time at the Imola Circuit and Franco Colapinto started the sprint race from pole position. Colapinto was passed by Caio Collet early in the sprint race, which was interrupted by two safety car periods; firstly when Zak O'Sullivan and Pepe Martí went into the gravel and secondly for a collision involving Reece Ushijima and Federico Malvestiti. Colapinto reclaimed the lead from Collet on the final lap shortly before a collision between Collet and Isack Hadjar eliminated Collet from the race. Colapinto crossed the finish line to take his and his team's first FIA Formula 3 race victory.

The feature race began in damp conditions. Drivers who opted to start on wet-weather tyres had an early advantage and Caio Collet overtook eight cars on the first lap to claim the lead from pole-sitter Zane Maloney. A safety car period followed after Francesco Pizzi spun, prompting Collet to pit for slick tyres and drop down the order. Pepe Martí, who started 24th, remained on wet tyres and passed Maloney for the lead, but soon pitted for slick tyres as the safety car was deployed following a crash for Brad Benavides. As the race was restarting, Maloney spun and stalled the car, allowing Roman Staněk into the lead. Staněk was soon passed by Oliver Bearman before the safety car was deployed for a third time to recover Maloney's car. Staněk reclaimed the lead with two laps remaining, whilst Bearman and Grégoire Saucy were taken out of podium contention after colliding at the final corner of the final lap. Staněk's victory was his first in FIA Formula 3. At the end of the round, Victor Martins remained in the lead of the championship, level on points with Arthur Leclerc.

=== Round 3: Spain ===
Roman Staněk claimed feature race pole position in qualifying at the Circuit de Barcelona-Catalunya and David Vidales started the sprint race from pole and held his lead at the start. Jak Crawford gradually caught up to Vidales after passing Juan Manuel Correa, but dropped back after his attempt to overtake failed. Vidales went on to score his first FIA Formula 3 race win. Championship leader Victor Martins retired from the race with mechanical problems, allowing Arthur Leclerc, who finished fourth, to take the lead in the standings.

Martins took the lead of the feature race from pole-sitter Staněk at the first corner. The race was interrupted by two safety cars, firstly when Rafael Villagómez and Kush Maini collided and again when Brad Benavides crashed. Martins maintained the lead to take his second race win of the season ahead of Staněk and Isack Hadjar. Martins reclaimed first place in the drivers' standings by six points over Staněk; Leclerc, classified sixteenth after receiving a penalty for colliding with Vidales, dropped to fifth in the championship.

=== Round 4: Great Britain ===
Zak O'Sullivan claimed his and Carlin's maiden FIA Formula 3 pole in qualifying at Silverstone Circuit, while Reece Ushijima earned his first start from pole in the reverse-grid sprint race. Ushijima was overtaken by championship leader Victor Martins at the first corner. Isack Hadjar, who started the race fourth, had passed Kush Maini and Ushijima to run in second place when the safety car was deployed to recover the stricken cars of Charouz Racing System teammates László Tóth and Zdeněk Chovanec, who had collided. Hadjar then overtook Martins on the penultimate lap to claim his second win of the season.

An accident involving Franco Colapinto brought out the safety car on the first lap of the feature race. Arthur Leclerc overtook pole-sitter O'Sullivan just as the safety car was being deployed, and was ordered to relinquish the position. Leclerc was able to pass O'Sullivan for the lead shortly after racing resumed. Another safety car period was called later in the race after a collision at Copse corner involving Rafael Villagómez and Nazim Azman. Oliver Bearman, who had passed Caio Collet for third place on the penultimate lap, was close to claiming second place from O'Sullivan as the two crossed the finish line side-by-side. O'Sullivan held second place by 0.051 seconds. After the fourth round, Martins remained at the top of the drivers' championship, six points ahead of second-placed Leclerc.

=== Round 5: Austria ===
Isack Hadjar took his first FIA Formula 3 pole position in qualifying at the Red Bull Ring. Caio Collet started the sprint race from pole, but was passed by Juan Manuel Correa on the first lap before the safety car was deployed to recover Rafael Villagómez's spun car. On lap six, Correa's car began to slow and he retired from the race, handing the lead back to Collet. The safety car was deployed again on lap 10 when Zane Maloney, Oliver Bearman and Arthur Leclerc were involved in a collision. Shortly after the restart, Jak Crawford, who had earlier overtaken Franco Colapinto for second place, passed Collet for the lead to claim his first victory in FIA Formula 3.

The feature race began in wet conditions behind the safety car. Pole-sitter Hadjar resisted second-placed Victor Martins at the start and extended his lead over the next 20 laps. In the closing stages of the race, contact between Francesco Pizzi and Zdeněk Chovanec (who had also collided earlier in the race) beached Chovanec in the gravel and the safety car was deployed. Hadjar held his lead at the restart, meanwhile a crash involving Collet, Crawford and Jonny Edgar dropped all three drivers out of the points. Hadjar took the chequered flag for his third win of the season, and first feature race victory. This promoted him to second in the drivers' championship, one point behind leader Martins.

=== Round 6: Hungary ===
Alexander Smolyar claimed feature race pole position at the Hungaroring, his first since 2020. Campos Racing stand-in driver Oliver Goethe started first in the sprint race, which took place in wet conditions and began behind the safety car. Goethe dropped to fourth place on the opening lap, allowing Franco Colapinto into the lead. Colapinto defended from Caio Collet and Isack Hadjar through two safety car restarts before Collet ultimately overtook for the lead. Collet's win was his first in FIA Formula 3, whilst teammate Kush Maini took his first podium finish. Hadjar finished fourth ahead of Victor Martins in sixth, allowing Hadjar to claim the lead of the drivers' championship by one point.

The feature race began as a standing start but in damp conditions. Smolyar, Zane Maloney and Oliver Bearman maintained their top three starting places to finish the race on the podium, with Smolyar claiming his first victory of the season and Maloney his first FIA Formula 3 podium. The track began to dry towards the end of the race, and some drivers, including 22nd-place starter Zak O'Sullivan, elected to change to dry-weather tyres. O'Sullivan used this advantage to rise to fourth place by the finish line. The round ended with Isack Hadjar and Victor Martins tied on points at the top of the drivers' championship, but with Hadjar ahead by virtue of having won more races.

=== Round 7: Belgium ===
Caio Collet took his first feature race pole position at the Circuit de Spa-Francorchamps in a wet-to-dry qualifying session, whilst none of the championship top four (Hadjar, Martins, Leclerc and Crawford) qualified higher than twentieth. Zak O'Sullivan qualified twelfth to claim sprint race pole position. On the first lap, contact between O'Sullivan and second-placed Juan Manuel Correa caused damage to both cars and forced them to make pit stops for repairs. Brad Benavides inherited the lead but was soon overtaken by Oliver Bearman, who started fifth. A high-speed collision at Blanchimont corner between Oliver Goethe and Zane Maloney brought out the red flag, stopping the race for barrier repairs. Both drivers were uninjured. Bearman held his position at the restart and went on to take his first FIA Formula 3 race win.

Maloney passed pole-sitter Collet on the first lap of the feature race, however both cars were off-track during the overtake. Collet forced third-placed Francesco Pizzi into the gravel upon rejoining the track, for which he was given a time penalty. The safety car was soon deployed after Kush Maini collided with Pizzi, Ido Cohen and Victor Martins. When racing resumed, Maloney was ordered to relinquish the lead, which was then traded between Oliver Goethe and Collet before Maloney was able to reclaim the position. Roman Staněk made his way into second place to make a Trident one-two finish, with Maloney achieving his first victory in the series. Collet's penalty dropped him from third to sixth and promoted Oliver Bearman to the podium. Bearman's two podium finishes moved him up to second place in the drivers' championship, one point behind leader Isack Hadjar.

=== Round 8: Netherlands ===
Zane Maloney claimed his second pole position of the season in qualifying at Circuit Zandvoort. Juan Manuel Correa started the sprint race from first place. Fourth-placed starter Caio Collet had a better start than Zak O'Sullivan and Grégoire Saucy, passing them both into turn one. Collet then caught and passed Correa for the lead on lap five. Collet took the race victory, his second of the year, and Correa's second-place finish was his first podium in the category.

Victor Martins took the lead of the feature race from Maloney at the first corner, but Maloney — who followed Martins closely over the following laps — retook the lead on lap twelve. A late-race safety car to recover Rafael Villagómez's beached car saw no change in the lead; Maloney claimed his second consecutive feature race victory. Martins' podium finish promoted him to the lead of the championship, five points ahead of Isack Hadjar.

=== Round 9: Italy (Monza) ===
Alexander Smolyar took pole position in the final qualifying session of the season at Monza Circuit, whilst championship contender Hadjar crashed and qualified sixteenth. Franco Colapinto started the sprint race on pole position. Championship leader Martins found the gravel on the first lap after contact with Oliver Bearman, dropping him to the back. Colapinto maintained first place to record his second win of the season. Oliver Bearman improved from seventh on the grid to second at the finish line, having overtaken Caio Collet and Jonny Edgar in one corner to reach the podium. Martins was able to recover a point, making up three places on the final lap. The results of the sprint race left six drivers (Martins, Hadjar, Bearman, Maloney, Staněk and Leclerc) in mathematical championship contention going into the final race, with Martins six points ahead of Hadjar and thirteen ahead of Bearman.

The lead of the feature race was contested during the opening laps, with Smolyar, Maloney and Martins all trading the position. Smolyar later retired from the race with suspension damage from contact with Leclerc and Staněk. Bearman progressed to second place after passing Martins and challenged Maloney for the lead. Shortly afterwards and with five laps remaining, the safety car was deployed to recover the cars of Kush Maini and Brad Benavides, who had collided and hit the barriers. The red flag was then shown so the barriers could be repaired, however the race was not restarted. Martins' third-place finish would have guaranteed him the championship title, however multiple drivers including Martins were then issued time penalties for track limits violations. After a delay, Martins was classified fourth, enough to declare him champion. Maloney's third consecutive feature race win promoted him to second in the standings.

== Results and standings ==
=== Season summary ===
Round		Circuit	Pole position	Fastest lap	Winning driver	Winning team	Report
1	S	Bahrain International Circuit		(Barbados) Zane Maloney	(France) Isack Hadjar	(United Kingdom) Hitech Grand Prix	Report
1	F	Bahrain International Circuit	(Argentina) Franco Colapinto	(Czech Republic) Roman Staněk	(France) Victor Martins	(France) ART Grand Prix	Report
2	S	(Italy) Imola Circuit		(United Kingdom) Oliver Bearman	(Argentina) Franco Colapinto	(Netherlands) Van Amersfoort Racing	Report
2	F	(Italy) Imola Circuit	(Barbados) Zane Maloney	(Czech Republic) Roman Staněk	(Czech Republic) Roman Staněk	(Italy) Trident	Report
3	S	(Spain) Circuit de Barcelona-Catalunya		(United States) Jak Crawford	(Spain) David Vidales	(Spain) Campos Racing	Report
3	F	(Spain) Circuit de Barcelona-Catalunya	(Czech Republic) Roman Staněk	(France) Victor Martins	(France) Victor Martins	(France) ART Grand Prix	Report
4	S	(United Kingdom) Silverstone Circuit		(France) Isack Hadjar	(France) Isack Hadjar	(United Kingdom) Hitech Grand Prix	Report
4	F	(United Kingdom) Silverstone Circuit	(United Kingdom) Zak O'Sullivan	(United States) Jak Crawford	(Monaco) Arthur Leclerc	(Italy) Prema Racing	Report
5	S	(Austria) Red Bull Ring		(Monaco) Arthur Leclerc	(United States) Jak Crawford	(Italy) Prema Racing	Report
5	F	(Austria) Red Bull Ring	(France) Isack Hadjar	(France) Isack Hadjar	(France) Isack Hadjar	(United Kingdom) Hitech Grand Prix	Report
6	S	(Hungary) Hungaroring		(Brazil) Caio Collet	(Brazil) Caio Collet	(Netherlands) MP Motorsport	Report
6	F	(Hungary) Hungaroring	Alexander Smolyar	(United Kingdom) Zak O'Sullivan	Alexander Smolyar	(Netherlands) MP Motorsport	Report
7	S	(Belgium) Circuit de Spa-Francorchamps		(United Kingdom) Jonny Edgar	(United Kingdom) Oliver Bearman	(Italy) Prema Racing	Report
7	F	(Belgium) Circuit de Spa-Francorchamps	(Brazil) Caio Collet	(Barbados) Zane Maloney	(Barbados) Zane Maloney	(Italy) Trident	Report
8	S	(Netherlands) Circuit Zandvoort		(Brazil) Caio Collet	(Brazil) Caio Collet	(Netherlands) MP Motorsport	Report
8	F	(Netherlands) Circuit Zandvoort	(Barbados) Zane Maloney	(Barbados) Zane Maloney	(Barbados) Zane Maloney	(Italy) Trident	Report
9	S	(Italy) Monza Circuit		Alexander Smolyar	(Argentina) Franco Colapinto	(Netherlands) Van Amersfoort Racing	Report
9	F	(Italy) Monza Circuit	Alexander Smolyar	(United Kingdom) Jonny Edgar	(Barbados) Zane Maloney	(Italy) Trident	Report

=== Scoring system ===
Points were awarded to the top ten classified finishers in both races. The feature race pole-sitter also received two points, and one point was given to the driver who set the fastest lap inside the top ten in both races. No extra points were awarded to the sprint race pole-sitter, as the grid for that was set by reversing the top twelve qualifiers.

Sprint race points

Points were awarded to the top 10 classified finishers. One point was awarded to the driver who set the fastest lap if he finished in the top 10. No fastest lap point was awarded if it was set by a driver outside the top 10.

Position	**1st**	**2nd**	**3rd**	**4th**	**5th**	**6th**	**7th**	**8th**	**9th**	**10th**	**FL**
Points	10	9	8	7	6	5	4	3	2	1	1

Feature race points

Points were awarded to the top ten classified finishers. Bonus points were awarded to the pole-sitter and to the driver who set the fastest lap and finished in the top ten.

Position	**1st**	**2nd**	**3rd**	**4th**	**5th**	**6th**	**7th**	**8th**	**9th**	**10th**	**Pole**	**FL**
Points	25	18	15	12	10	8	6	4	2	1	2	1

=== Drivers' championship ===
Pos.	Driver	BHR (Bahrain)		IMO (Italy)		CAT (Spain)		SIL (United Kingdom)		RBR (Austria)		HUN (Hungary)		SPA (Belgium)		ZAN (Netherlands)		MNZ (Italy)		Points
Pos.	Driver	SR	FR	SR	FR	SR	FR	SR	FR	SR	FR	SR	FR	SR	FR	SR	FR	SR	FR	Points
1	(France) Victor Martins	Ret	1	2	9	Ret	1	2	7	8	2	6	10	21	Ret	7	2	10	4	139
2	(Barbados) Zane Maloney	4	Ret	6	**Ret**	21	13	7	11	Ret	5	10	2	Ret	1	17	**1**	4	1	134
3	(United Kingdom) Oliver Bearman	2	6	12	17	12	5	9	3	16	3	5	3	1	3	11	25	2	2	132
4	(France) Isack Hadjar	1	25	5	3	10	3	1	5	10	**1**	4	18	9	14	6	5	27	9	123
5	(Czech Republic) Roman Staněk	24	22	4	1	8	**2**	6	Ret	5	11	9	12	2	2	10	4	12	6	117
6	(Monaco) Arthur Leclerc	5	2	13	4	4	16	8	1	4	4	27	8	5	11	12	12	8	5	114
7	(United States) Jak Crawford	27	7	3	2	2	6	10	6	1	22	20	5	11	17	9	6	7	3	109
8	(Brazil) Caio Collet	7	Ret	24†	11	3	7	11	4	2	27	1	9	10	**6**	1	7	3	20	88
9	(Argentina) Franco Colapinto	25	**5**	1	22	Ret	8	13	Ret	3	6	2	15	15	12	13	3	1	15	76
10	Alexander Smolyar	3	23	8	14	6	4			9	7	15	**1**	3	9	14	10	25	**27**†	76
11	(United Kingdom) Zak O'Sullivan	6	18	Ret	6	18	27†	14	**2**	12	17	18	4	20	13	3	23	Ret	11	54
12	(United Kingdom) Jonny Edgar	13	11					15	8	7	21	13	24	4	5	4	9	5	8	46
13	(United States) Juan Manuel Correa	9	4			5	10	21	Ret	Ret	10	12	6	17	15	2	24	13	24	39
14	(India) Kush Maini	15	16	20	5	17	25	4	22	19	25†	3	7	13	Ret	18	11	11	13	31
15	(Switzerland) Grégoire Saucy	Ret	3	Ret	23†	11	11	18	25	11	14	7	11	12	Ret	5	Ret	6	28†	30
16	(Spain) David Vidales	10	8	11	8	1	Ret	12	9	18	12	Ret	13	7	8	21	Ret	DNS	Ret	29
17	(United States) Kaylen Frederick	8	10	16	7	7	9	5	12	6	23	19	20	Ret	16	15	13	Ret	25	27
18	(Finland) William Alatalo	11	9	15	10	15	12	19	16	Ret	8	16	16	6	7	30	Ret	14	7	24
19	(Monaco) Oliver Goethe											8	28	Ret	4					15
20	(United Kingdom) Reece Ushijima	12	17	Ret	18	9	19	3	10	17	13	11	14	14	10	22	19	19	10	13
21	(Colombia) Sebastián Montoya															8	8			7
22	(Denmark) Oliver Rasmussen			7	Ret	16	14													4
23	(United States) Brad Benavides	21	20	14	Ret	25	Ret	NC	20	20	20	Ret	22	8	18	26	Ret	18	14	3
24	(Israel) Ido Cohen	14	15	23	13	23	22	17	15	14	9	Ret	17	24†	Ret	29	16	15	12	2
25	(Mexico) Rafael Villagómez	17	12	9	20	14	Ret	26	Ret	Ret	15	17	21	23	19	28	Ret	26	Ret	2
26	(Spain) Pepe Martí	28†	13	Ret	15	13	20	20	23	13	Ret	14	29	Ret	22	19	14	9	26	2
27	(Italy) Francesco Pizzi	19	Ret	10	Ret	24	17	24	14	15	24	21	27	19	21	16	18	17	16	1
28	(Germany) David Schumacher			18	12											20	15			0
29	(Italy) Federico Malvestiti			Ret	21	19	21	25	13	21	26	25	25	18	26	24	20	16	18	0
30	(Finland) Niko Kari	26	14																	0
31	(Germany) Lirim Zendeli					20	15													0
32	(Malaysia) Nazim Azman	16	Ret	21	19	Ret	18	22	Ret	24	16	23	26	16	20	25	21	21	21	0
33	(United States) Hunter Yeany	23	21	17	16	27	26	16	19	22	WD							24	17	0
34	(Italy) Enzo Trulli	20	26	22	24	22	24	27	17	25	18	24	19	DSQ	24	23	17	20	22	0
35	(United Kingdom) Ayrton Simmons	18	19																	0
36	(Romania) Filip Ugran							23	18											0
37	(Hungary) László Tóth	22	24	19	25	26	23	Ret	21	23	19	26	Ret	22	25	27	22	22	19	0
38	(United Kingdom) Christian Mansell											22	23	Ret	23					0
39	(Italy) Alessandro Famularo																	23	23	0
40	(Portugal) Zdeněk Chovanec							Ret	24	26	Ret									0
Pos.	Driver	SR	FR	SR	FR	SR	FR	SR	FR	SR	FR	SR	FR	SR	FR	SR	FR	SR	FR	Points
Pos.	Driver	BHR (Bahrain)		IMO (Italy)		CAT (Spain)		SIL (United Kingdom)		RBR (Austria)		HUN (Hungary)		SPA (Belgium)		ZAN (Netherlands)		MNZ (Italy)		Points

Key
Colour	Result
Gold	Winner
Silver	Second place
Bronze	Third place
Green	Other points position
Blue	Other classified position
Blue	Not classified, finished (NC)
Purple	Not classified, retired (Ret)
Red	Did not qualify (DNQ)
Red	Did not pre-qualify (DNPQ)
Black	Disqualified (DSQ)
White	Did not start (DNS)
White	Race cancelled (C)
Blank	Did not practice (DNP)
Blank	Excluded (EX)
Blank	Did not arrive (DNA)
Blank	Withdrawn (WD)
Blank	Did not enter (cell empty)
Text formatting	Meaning
**Bold**	Pole position
Italics	Fastest lap

Notes:

- † – Drivers did not finish the race, but were classified as they completed more than 90% of the race distance.

=== Teams' championship ===
Pos.	Team	BHR (Bahrain)		IMO (Italy)		CAT (Spain)		SIL (United Kingdom)		RBR (Austria)		HUN (Hungary)		SPA (Belgium)		ZAN (Netherlands)		MNZ (Italy)		Points
Pos.	Team	SR	FR	SR	FR	SR	FR	SR	FR	SR	FR	SR	FR	SR	FR	SR	FR	SR	FR	Points
1	(Italy) Prema Racing	2	2	3	2	2	5	8	1	1	3	5	3	1	3	9	6	2	2	355
1	(Italy) Prema Racing	5	6	12	4	4	6	9	3	4	4	20	5	5	11	11	12	7	3	355
1	(Italy) Prema Racing	27	7	13	17	12	16	10	6	16	22	27	8	11	17	12	25	8	5	355
2	(Italy) Trident	4	11	4	1	8	**2**	6	8	5	5	9	2	2	1	4	**1**	4	1	301
2	(Italy) Trident	13	22	6	**Ret**	16	13	7	11	7	11	10	12	4	2	10	4	5	6	301
2	(Italy) Trident	24	Ret	7	Ret	21	14	15	Ret	Ret	21	13	24	Ret	5	17	9	12	8	301
3	(France) ART Grand Prix	9	1	2	9	5	1	2	7	8	2	6	6	12	15	2	2	6	4	208
3	(France) ART Grand Prix	Ret	3	Ret	23†	11	10	18	25	11	10	7	10	17	Ret	5	24	10	24	208
3	(France) ART Grand Prix	Ret	4			Ret	11	21	Ret	Ret	14	12	11	21	Ret	7	Ret	13	28	208
4	(Netherlands) MP Motorsport	3	16	8	5	3	4	4	4	2	7	1	**1**	3	**6**	1	7	3	15	195
4	(Netherlands) MP Motorsport	7	23	20	11	6	7	11	18	9	25†	3	7	10	9	14	10	11	20	195
4	(Netherlands) MP Motorsport	15	Ret	24†	14	17	25	23	22	19	27	15	9	13	Ret	18	11	25	**27**	195
5	(United Kingdom) Hitech Grand Prix	1	10	5	3	7	3	1	5	6	**1**	4	18	9	14	6	5	21	9	150
5	(United Kingdom) Hitech Grand Prix	8	25	16	7	10	9	5	12	10	16	19	20	16	16	15	13	27	21	150
5	(United Kingdom) Hitech Grand Prix	16	Ret	21	19	Ret	18	22	Ret	24	23	23	26	Ret	20	25	21	Ret	25	150
6	(Netherlands) Van Amersfoort Racing	12	**5**	1	18	9	8	3	10	3	6	2	14	14	10	13	3	1	10	91
6	(Netherlands) Van Amersfoort Racing	17	12	9	20	14	19	13	Ret	17	13	11	15	15	12	22	19	19	14	91
6	(Netherlands) Van Amersfoort Racing	25	17	Ret	22	Ret	Ret	26	Ret	Ret	15	17	21	23	19	28	Ret	26	Ret	91
7	(United Kingdom) Carlin	6	18	14	6	18	24	14	**2**	12	17	18	4	8	13	3	17	18	11	57
7	(United Kingdom) Carlin	20	20	22	24	22	27†	27	17	20	18	24	19	20	18	23	23	20	13	57
7	(United Kingdom) Carlin	21	26	Ret	Ret	25	Ret	NC	20	25	20	Ret	22	DSQ	24	26	Ret	Ret	22	57
8	(Spain) Campos Racing	10	8	11	8	1	20	12	9	13	12	8	13	7	4	8	8	9	17	53
8	(Spain) Campos Racing	23	13	17	15	13	26	16	19	18	Ret	14	28	Ret	8	19	14	24	26	53
8	(Spain) Campos Racing	28†	21	Ret	16	27	Ret	20	23	22	WD	Ret	29	Ret	22	21	Ret	DNS	Ret	53
9	(Switzerland) Jenzer Motorsport	11	9	15	10	15	12	17	13	14	8	16	16	6	7	24	16	14	7	26
9	(Switzerland) Jenzer Motorsport	14	14	23	13	19	21	19	15	21	9	25	17	18	26	29	20	15	12	26
9	(Switzerland) Jenzer Motorsport	26	15	Ret	21	23	22	25	16	Ret	26	Ret	25	24†	Ret	30	Ret	16	18	26
10	(Czech Republic) Charouz Racing System	18	19	10	12	20	15	24	14	15	19	21	23	19	21	16	15	17	16	1
10	(Czech Republic) Charouz Racing System	19	24	18	25	24	17	Ret	21	23	24	22	27	22	23	20	18	22	19	1
10	(Czech Republic) Charouz Racing System	22	Ret	19	Ret	26	23	Ret	24	26	Ret	26	Ret	Ret	25	27	22	23	23	1
Pos.	Team	SR	FR	SR	FR	SR	FR	SR	FR	SR	FR	SR	FR	SR	FR	SR	FR	SR	FR	Points
Pos.	Team	BHR (Bahrain)		IMO (Italy)		CAT (Spain)		SIL (United Kingdom)		RBR (Austria)		HUN (Hungary)		SPA (Belgium)		ZAN (Netherlands)		MNZ (Italy)		Points

Key
Colour	Result
Gold	Winner
Silver	Second place
Bronze	Third place
Green	Other points position
Blue	Other classified position
Blue	Not classified, finished (NC)
Purple	Not classified, retired (Ret)
Red	Did not qualify (DNQ)
Red	Did not pre-qualify (DNPQ)
Black	Disqualified (DSQ)
White	Did not start (DNS)
White	Race cancelled (C)
Blank	Did not practice (DNP)
Blank	Excluded (EX)
Blank	Did not arrive (DNA)
Blank	Withdrawn (WD)
Blank	Did not enter (cell empty)
Text formatting	Meaning
**Bold**	Pole position
Italics	Fastest lap
