= Enzo Scionti =

American racing driver (born 2005)

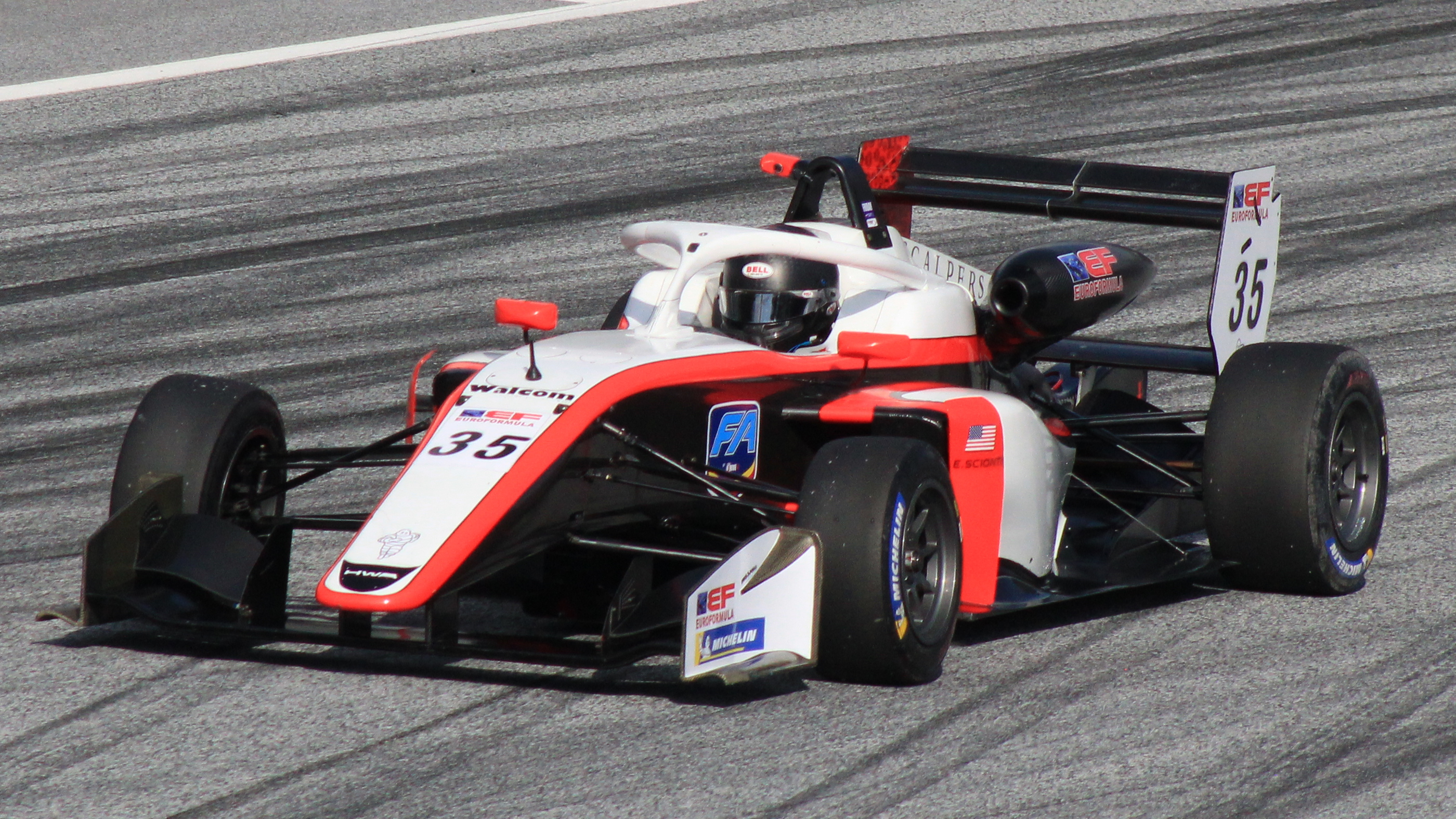
- Scionti at the Red Bull Ring
- Nationality: (United States) American
- Born: April 22, 2005 (age 21) Houston, Texas, United States

Euroformula Open Championship career
- Debut season: 2021
- Current team: none
- Car number: 21
- Starts: 24 (24 entries)
- Wins: 0
- Podiums: 0
- Poles: 0
- Fastest laps: 0
- Best finish: 14th in 2021

Previous series
- 2021: Formula 4 UAE Championship

Enzo Scionti (born April 22, 2005) is an American racing driver who most recently competed in the Formula Regional European Championship with Monolite Racing. He previously competed in the 2021 Euroformula Open Championship with Drivex School.

== Racing record ==
=== Racing career summary ===
Season	Series	Team	Races	Wins	Poles	F/Laps	Podiums	Points	Position
2021	Formula 4 UAE Championship	Cram Durango	20	0	0	0	0	43	13th
2021	Euroformula Open Championship	Drivex School	24	0	0	0	0	33	14th
2023	Formula Regional European Championship	Monolite Racing	18	0	0	0	0	0	31st
2023	Prototype Cup Germany	MMi Motorsport	2	0	0	0	0	0	NC†
2024	Formula Regional European Championship	KIC Motorsport	2	0	0	0	0	0	39th

^{†} As Scionti was a guest driver, he was ineligible to score points. * Season still in progress.

=== Complete Formula 4 UAE Championship results ===
(key) (Races in bold indicate pole position) (Races in italics indicate fastest lap)

Year	Team	1	2	3	4	5	6	7	8	9	10	11	12	13	14	15	16	17	18	19	20	Pos	Points
2021	Cram Durango	DUB1; 1; 11	DUB1; 2; 10	DUB1; 3 Ret	DUB1; 4; 11	YMC1; 1 Ret	YMC1; 2 Ret	YMC1; 3; 10	YMC1; 4; 11	DUB2; 1; 9	DUB2; 2; 9	DUB2; 3; 12	DUB2; 4; 11	YMC2; 1; 7	YMC2; 2; 10	YMC2; 3; 6	YMC2; 4; 6	DUB3; 1; 5	DUB3; 2 Ret	DUB3; 3; 9	DUB3; 4; 9	13th	43

=== Complete Euroformula Open Championship results ===
(key) (Races in bold indicate pole position; races in italics indicate points for the fastest lap of top ten finishers)

Year	Entrant	1	2	3	4	5	6	7	8	9	10	11	12	13	14	15	16	17	18	19	20	21	22	23	24	DC	Points
2021	Drivex School	POR; 1; 11	POR; 2; 7	POR; 3; 11	LEC; 1 Ret	LEC; 2; 8	LEC; 3; 10	SPA; 1; 7	SPA; 2; 12	SPA; 3; 9	HUN; 1; 10	HUN; 2; 12	HUN; 3; 11	IMO; 1; 9†	IMO; 2; 10	IMO; 3; 10	RBR; 1; 12	RBR; 2; 13	RBR; 3; 9	MNZ; 1; 10	MNZ; 2; 8	MNZ; 3 Ret	CAT; 1; 15	CAT; 2; 14	CAT; 3; 12*	14th	33

=== Complete Formula Regional European Championship results ===
(key) (Races in bold indicate pole position) (Races in italics indicate fastest lap)

Year	Team	1	2	3	4	5	6	7	8	9	10	11	12	13	14	15	16	17	18	19	20	DC	Points
2023	Monolite Racing	IMO; 1; 25	IMO; 2; 15	CAT; 1; 23	CAT; 2 Ret	HUN; 1; 32	HUN; 2; 24	SPA; 1 Ret	SPA; 2; 27	MUG; 1; 25	MUG; 2; 21	LEC; 1; 29	LEC; 2; 24	RBR; 1	RBR; 2	MNZ; 1; 24	MNZ; 2; 30	ZAN; 1; 27	ZAN; 2; 21	HOC; 1; 26	HOC; 2; 20	31st	0
2024	KIC Motorsport	HOC; 1	HOC; 2	SPA; 1	SPA; 2	ZAN; 1	ZAN; 2	HUN; 1	HUN; 2	MUG; 1	MUG; 2	LEC; 1	LEC; 2	IMO; 1	IMO; 2	RBR; 1	RBR; 2	CAT; 1; 28	CAT; 2; 23	MNZ; 1	MNZ; 2	39th	0

^{*} Season still in progress.
