= Zdeněk Chovanec =

Czech and Venezuelan racing driver (2004–2026)

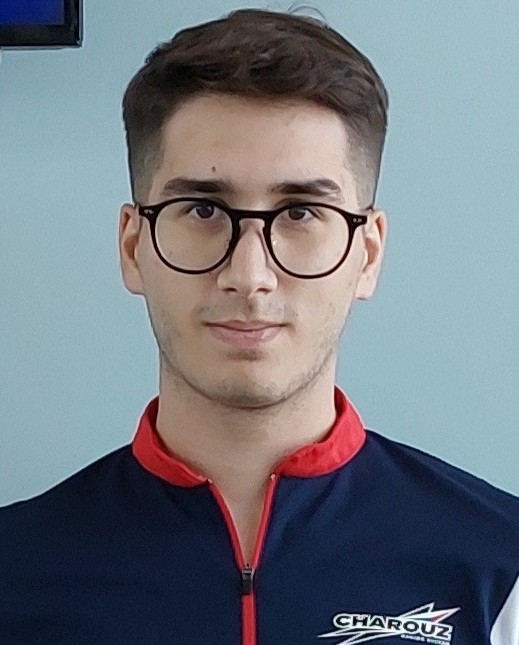
- Chovanec in 2022
- Nationality: (Czech Republic) Czech (Portugal) Portuguese (Venezuela) Venezuelan via triple nationality
- Born: Zdeněk Chovanec López; 9 October 2004 Puerto la Cruz, Venezuela
- Died: 18 July 2026 (aged 21) Trofa, Portugal

FIA Formula 3 Championship career
- Debut season: 2021
- Current team: Charouz Racing System
- Categorisation: FIA Silver
- Car number: 15
- Starts: 12 (13 entries)
- Wins: 0
- Podiums: 0
- Poles: 0
- Fastest laps: 0
- Best finish: 34th in 2021

Previous series
- 2021 2021 2020 2020: F3 Asian Championship; Euroformula Open Championship; Formula 4 UAE Championship; Italian F4 Championship

Zdeněk Chovanec López (9 October 2004 – 18 July 2026), otherwise known as Zdeněk Chovanec Jr. or simply Zdeněk Chovanec, was a Czech, Portuguese, and Venezuelan racing driver. He notably raced in the FIA Formula 3 Championship with Charouz Racing System.

Chovanec raced with Double R Racing in the Euroformula Open Championship in 2021, and made the switch to FIA F3 with Charouz Racing System prior to round five of the championship, following Reshad de Gerus' departure from the team. He previously competed in the Italian F4 Championship in 2020.

== Early career ==
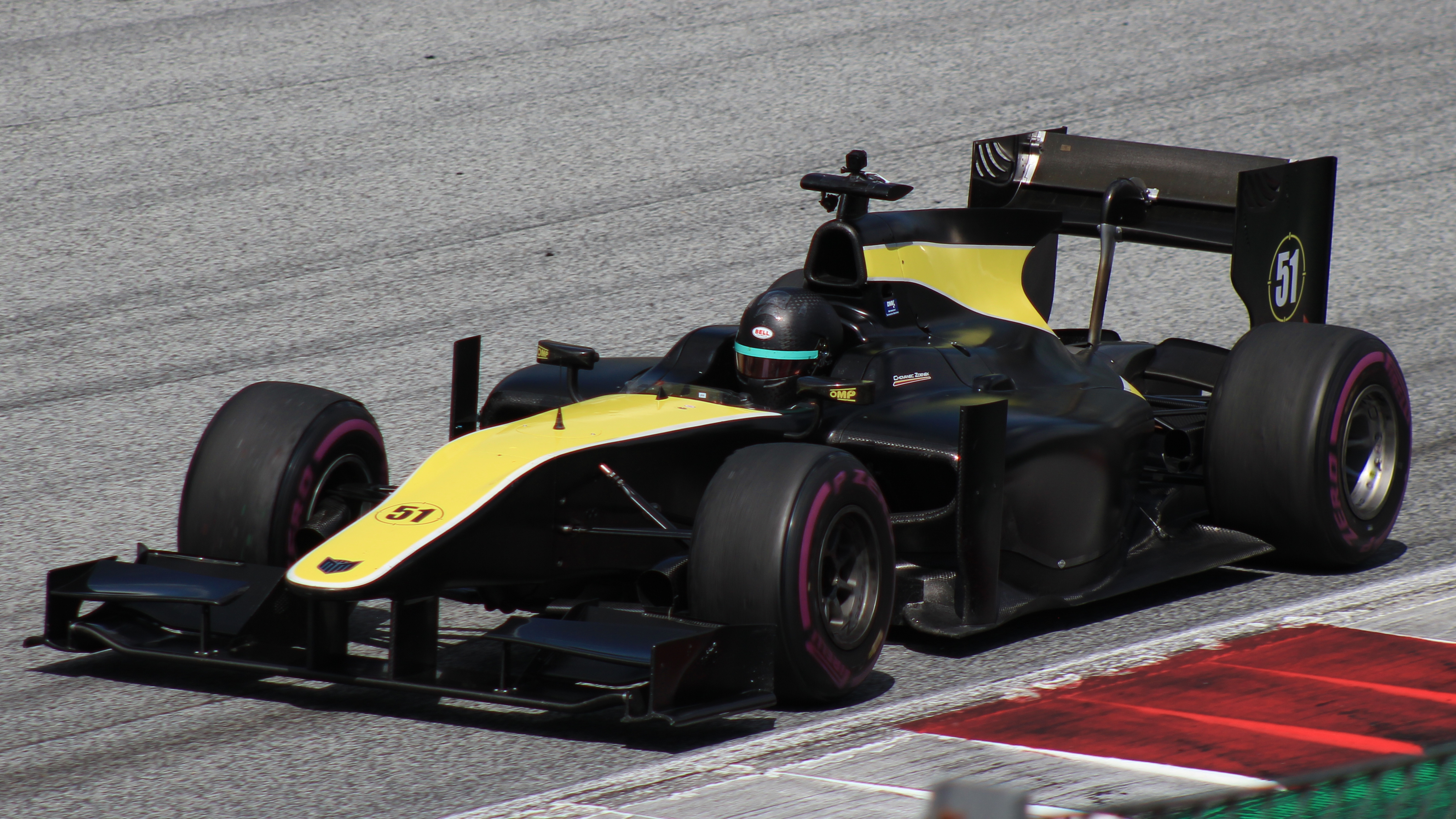
Chovanec driving at the Red Bull Ring in BOSS GP in 2022.

=== Karting ===
Zdeněk Chovanec López was born in Puerto la Cruz, Venezuela on 9 October 2004, to a family with Czech roots. He started karting professionally in 2018 at the age of 14 while living in Portugal, fairly late compared to other drivers.

=== Lower formulae ===
==== 2020 ====
In early 2020, Chovanec made his car racing debut, competing with Xcel Motorsport in the 2020 Formula 4 UAE Championship. He was seventh in the standings with two podium finishes. He then went on to race with Bhaitech in the Italian F4 Championship, finishing 17th in the championship with eighteen points.

==== 2021 ====
Chovanec started 2021 stepping up to the F3 Asian Championship for the first round of the season with BlackArts Racing, and scored points in only his third race. He later signed with Double R Racing to compete in the Euroformula Open Championship. After five rounds in which he generally was a backmarker, he moved to Charouz Racing System to take part in the remaining five events of the 2021 FIA F3 season, replacing Reshad de Gerus. He achieved a best finish of 20th twice and finished second last in the championship.

==== 2022 ====
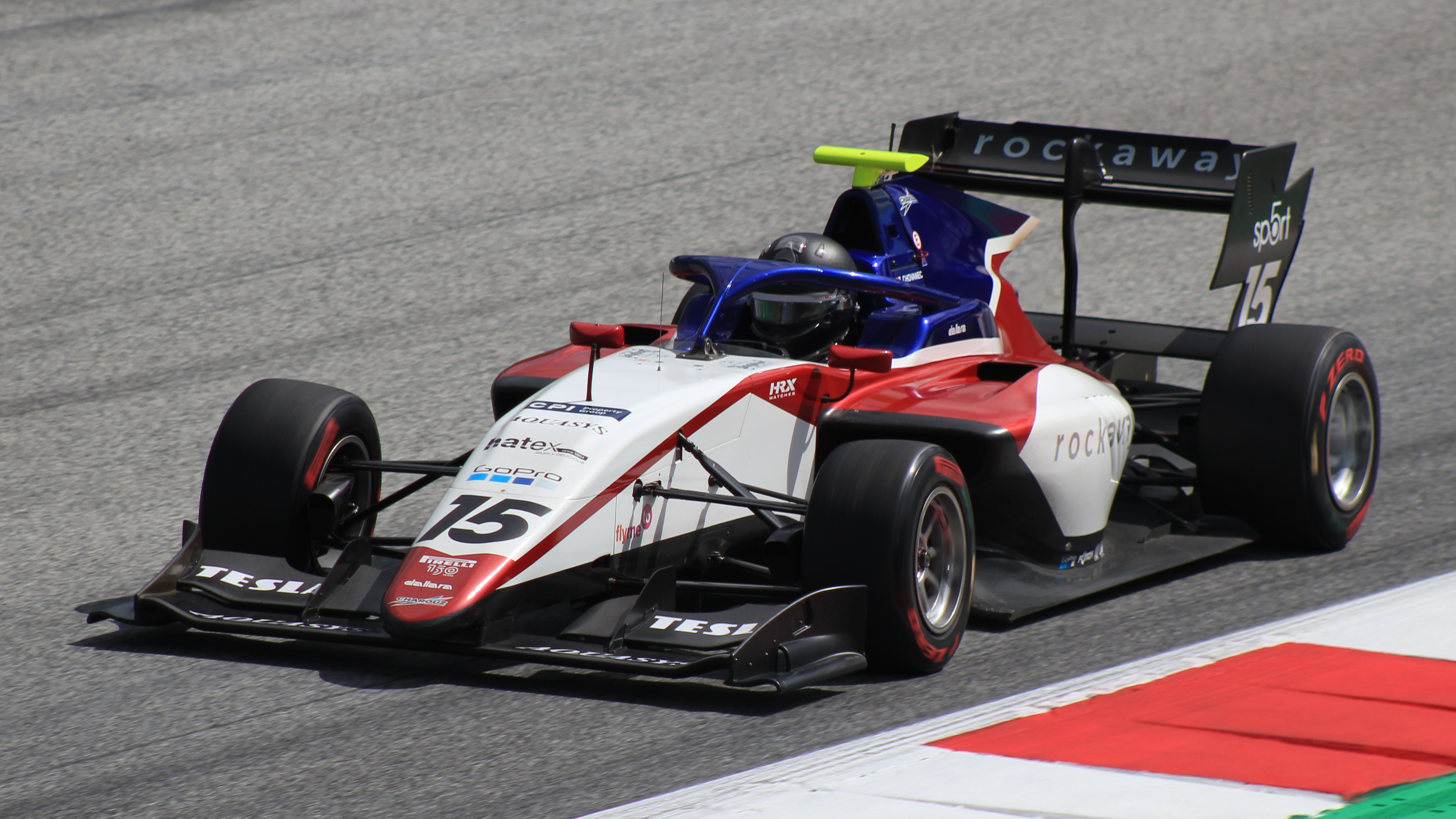
Chovanec driving the Dallara F3 2019 during the 2022 Spielberg Formula 3 round.

In 2022, Chovanec drove for MM International Motorsport in BOSS GP. Chovanec also drove for Charouz Racing System in his return to the 2022 FIA F3 season in Silverstone, replacing Lirim Zendeli. In the sprint race, Chovanec caused a collision with teammate László Tóth and retired; he was given a three-place grid penalty ahead of the feature race. He was retained at Spielberg, where in the feature race he was involved in an accident with teammate Francesco Pizzi, as the Italian spun Chovanec out of the race. However, for the Budapest round, Chovanec was replaced by Christian Mansell. Chovanec ended the season 40th and last in the standings with no points.

== Sportscar career ==
=== 2023 season ===
The 2023 season would see Chovanec making a move to sportscar racing, driving a Mercedes-AMG GT3 Evo for the GetSpeed Performance alongside Lance Bergstein and Aaron Walker in the Silver Cup class of the GT World Challenge Europe Endurance Cup. However, he withdrew from the season before the opening round. Chovanec made a lone appearance in the LMP3 class of the Ultimate Cup Series, driving at Estoril with TS Corse.

Chovanec stepped away from racing in late 2024 due to "personal issues". Despite this, in early 2025, he would make a one-off test for the Fast Track Racing team at Daytona International Speedway in the ARCA Menards Series. This would turn out to be his last time in a race car.

== Personal life and death ==
Chovanec was close with fellow Charouz Racing System drivers Enzo Fittipaldi and László Tóth. In 2024, he founded ZDK Motorsport, a company dedicated to the restoration of classic cars, automotive mechanics and the sale and assembly of performance components.

Chovanec died on 18 July 2026, at the age of 21.

== Racing record ==
=== Karting career summary ===
| Season | Series | Team | Position |
|---|---|---|---|
| 2019 | IAME Winter Cup - X30 Senior | Monlau Junior Team | N/A |

=== Racing career summary ===
| Season | Series | Team | Races | Wins | Poles | F/Laps | Podiums | Points | Position |
|---|---|---|---|---|---|---|---|---|---|
| 2020 | Formula 4 UAE Championship | Xcel Motorsport | 19 | 0 | 0 | 0 | 2 | 88 | 7th |
| 2020 | Italian F4 Championship | Bhaitech | 14 | 0 | 0 | 0 | 0 | 18 | 17th |
| 2021 | Euroformula Open Championship | Double R Racing | 18 | 0 | 0 | 0 | 0 | 33 | 15th |
| 2021 | FIA Formula 3 Championship | Charouz Racing System | 8 | 0 | 0 | 0 | 0 | 0 | 34th |
| 2021 | F3 Asian Championship | BlackArts Racing | 2 | 0 | 0 | 0 | 0 | 2 | 18th |
| 2022 | BOSS GP Series - Formula Class | MM International Motorsport | 6 | 5 | 5 | 0 | 6 | 147 | 5th |
| 2022 | FIA Formula 3 Championship | Charouz Racing System | 4 | 0 | 0 | 0 | 0 | 0 | 40th |
| 2023 | Ultimate Cup Series - Proto P3 | TS Corse | 1 | 0 | 0 | 0 | 0 | 24 | 15th |

=== Complete Formula 4 UAE Championship results ===
(key) (Races in bold indicate pole position; races in italics indicate fastest lap)

| Year | Team | 1 | 2 | 3 | 4 | 5 | 6 | 7 | 8 | 9 | 10 | 11 | 12 | 13 | 14 | 15 | 16 | 17 | 18 | 19 | 20 | DC | Points |
|---|---|---|---|---|---|---|---|---|---|---|---|---|---|---|---|---|---|---|---|---|---|---|---|
| 2020 | Xcel Motorsport | DUB1; 1; 7 | DUB1; 2; 6 | DUB1; 3 Ret | DUB1; 4 C | YMC1; 1; 5 | YMC1; 2; 3 | YMC1; 3; 5 | YMC1; 4; 4 | YMC2; 1; 5 | YMC2; 2; 7 | YMC2; 3; 7 | YMC2; 4 Ret | DUB2; 1; 10 | DUB2; 2; 8 | DUB2; 3; 6 | DUB2; 4 Ret | DUB3; 1; 11 | DUB3; 2; 10 | DUB3; 3; 10 | DUB3; 4; 3 | 7th | 113 |

=== Complete Italian F4 Championship results ===
(key) (Races in bold indicate pole position) (Races in italics indicate fastest lap)

| Year | Team | 1 | 2 | 3 | 4 | 5 | 6 | 7 | 8 | 9 | 10 | 11 | 12 | 13 | 14 | 15 | 16 | 17 | 18 | 19 | 20 | 21 | Pos | Points |
|---|---|---|---|---|---|---|---|---|---|---|---|---|---|---|---|---|---|---|---|---|---|---|---|---|
| 2020 | Bhaitech | MIS; 1 Ret | MIS; 2; 14 | MIS; 3; 13 | IMO1; 1; 5 | IMO1; 2; 19 | IMO1; 3 Ret | RBR; 1 Ret | RBR; 2; 27 | RBR; 3; 24† | MUG; 1; 18 | MUG; 2; 27 | MUG; 3; 6 | MNZ; 1; 14 | MNZ; 2 Ret | MNZ; 3; 13 | IMO2; 1 | IMO2; 2 | IMO2; 3 | VLL; 1 | VLL; 2 | VLL; 3 | 17th | 18 |

=== Complete Euroformula Open Championship results ===
(key) (Races in bold indicate pole position; races in italics indicate points for the fastest lap of top ten finishers)

| Year | Entrant | 1 | 2 | 3 | 4 | 5 | 6 | 7 | 8 | 9 | 10 | 11 | 12 | 13 | 14 | 15 | 16 | 17 | 18 | 19 | 20 | 21 | 22 | 23 | 24 | DC | Points |
|---|---|---|---|---|---|---|---|---|---|---|---|---|---|---|---|---|---|---|---|---|---|---|---|---|---|---|---|
| 2021 | Double R Racing | POR; 1; 12 | POR; 2; 8 | POR; 3; 9 | LEC; 1; 9 | LEC; 2; 10 | LEC; 3; 9 | SPA; 1 Ret | SPA; 2; 9 | SPA; 3 Ret | HUN; 1; 9 | HUN; 2; 11 | HUN; 3; 9 | IMO; 1; 7 | IMO; 2; 11 | IMO; 3; 7 | RBR; 1; 11* | RBR; 2; 11 | RBR; 3 Ret | MNZ; 1 | MNZ; 2 | MNZ; 3 | CAT; 1 | CAT; 2 | CAT; 3 | 15th | 33 |

=== Complete FIA Formula 3 Championship results ===
(key) (Races in bold indicate pole position; races in italics indicate points for the fastest lap of top ten finishers)

| Year | Entrant | 1 | 2 | 3 | 4 | 5 | 6 | 7 | 8 | 9 | 10 | 11 | 12 | 13 | 14 | 15 | 16 | 17 | 18 | 19 | 20 | 21 | DC | Points |
|---|---|---|---|---|---|---|---|---|---|---|---|---|---|---|---|---|---|---|---|---|---|---|---|---|
| 2021 | Charouz Racing System | CAT; 1 | CAT; 2 | CAT; 3 | LEC; 1 | LEC; 2 | LEC; 3 | RBR; 1 | RBR; 2 | RBR; 3 | HUN; 1 | HUN; 2 | HUN; 3 | SPA; 1; 26 | SPA; 2; 26 | SPA; 3; 24 | ZAN; 1; 26 | ZAN; 2; 20 | ZAN; 3; 23 | SOC; 1; 26 | SOC; 2 C | SOC; 3; 20 | 34th | 0 |
| 2022 | Charouz Racing System | BHR; SPR | BHR; FEA | IMO; SPR | IMO; FEA | CAT; SPR | CAT; FEA | SIL; SPR; Ret | SIL; FEA; 24 | RBR; SPR; 26 | RBR; FEA; Ret | HUN; SPR | HUN; FEA | SPA; SPR | SPA; FEA | ZAN; SPR | ZAN; FEA | MNZ; SPR | MNZ; SPR | | | | 40th | 0 |

=== Complete BOSS GP Series results ===
(key) (Races in bold indicate pole position; races in italics indicate points for the fastest lap of top ten finishers)

| Year | Entrant | Car | Class | 1 | 2 | 3 | 4 | 5 | 6 | 7 | 8 | 9 | 10 | 11 | 12 | DC | Points |
|---|---|---|---|---|---|---|---|---|---|---|---|---|---|---|---|---|---|
| 2022 | MM International Motorsport | Dallara GP2/11 | Formula | HOC; 1; 4 | HOC; 2; 6 | RBR; 1; 3 | RBR; 2; 3 | LEC; 1; 3 | LEC; 2; 2 | BRN; 1 | BRN; 2 | MUG; 1 | MUG; 2 | MIS; 1 | MIS; 2 | 5th | 147 |

=== Complete Ultimate Cup Series results ===
(key) (Races in bold indicate pole position; results in italics indicate fastest lap)

| Year | Entrant | Class | Chassis | 1 | 2 | 3 | 4 | 5 | 6 | Rank | Points |
|---|---|---|---|---|---|---|---|---|---|---|---|
| 2023 | TS Corse | LMP3 | Duqueine M30 - D08 | LEC1 | NAV | HOC | EST; 11 | MAG | LEC2 | 15th | 24 |
