= 2021 Euroformula Open Championship =

Single-seater motor racing series

The 2021 Euroformula Open Championship was a multi-event motor racing championship for single-seater open wheel formula racing cars that was held across Europe. The championship featured drivers competing in Euroformula Open Championship specification Dallara 320 chassis cars. It was the eighth Euroformula Open Championship season.

== Teams and drivers ==
All teams utilized the Dallara 320 chassis.

Team	Engine	No.	Driver	Status	Rounds
(Germany) Team Motopark	Volkswagen	1	(United States) Cameron Das		8 (Note: Das competed in race 2 and race 3 of round 8 with the No. 1, which was available to him as he had been crowned champion after race 1.)
(Germany) Team Motopark	Volkswagen	28	(United States) Cameron Das		All
(Germany) Team Motopark	Volkswagen	7	(Czech Republic) Roman Staněk		5
(Germany) Team Motopark	Volkswagen	10	(France) Reshad de Gerus		6–7
(Germany) Team Motopark	Volkswagen	10	(Australia) Christian Mansell	R	8
(Germany) Team Motopark	Volkswagen	40	(Germany) Matthias Lüthen		3
(Germany) Team Motopark	Volkswagen	52	(United States) Jak Crawford	R	1–2, 4–6, 8
(Germany) Team Motopark	Volkswagen	52	(Australia) Christian Mansell	R	7
(Germany) Team Motopark	Volkswagen	77	(Hungary) Vivien Keszthelyi		1–4
(Netherlands) Van Amersfoort Racing	Mercedes-Benz	8	(Mexico) Rafael Villagómez		1–2, 4–6, 8
(Netherlands) Van Amersfoort Racing	Mercedes-Benz	16	(Germany) Andreas Estner		1
(Netherlands) Van Amersfoort Racing	Mercedes-Benz	25	(United Kingdom) Casper Stevenson	R	All
(Netherlands) Van Amersfoort Racing	Mercedes-Benz	74	(Turkey) Cem Bölükbaşı		4–8
(United Kingdom) Carlin Motorsport	Volkswagen	15	(Italy) Enzo Trulli	R	5–8
(United Kingdom) Carlin Motorsport	Volkswagen	31	(Australia) Christian Mansell	R	3
(United Kingdom) Carlin Motorsport	Volkswagen	71	(United States) Brad Benavides		6–8
(Japan) CryptoTower Racing	Volkswagen	18	(Malaysia) Nazim Azman		All
(Japan) CryptoTower Racing	Volkswagen	27	(United Kingdom) Louis Foster		All
(Japan) CryptoTower Racing	Volkswagen	88	(Poland) Filip Kaminiarz		All
(United Kingdom) Double R Racing	Mercedes-Benz	21	(United Kingdom) Josh Mason		All
(United Kingdom) Double R Racing	Mercedes-Benz	66	(Portugal) Zdeněk Chovanec (Note: Chovanec is a Czech-Venezuelan-Portuguese driver who competed under a Venezuelan licence in round 1 and a Portuguese licence in rounds 2–6.)	R	1–6
(United Kingdom) Double R Racing	Mercedes-Benz	66	(Mexico) Sebastián Álvarez	G	8
(Spain) Drivex School	Mercedes-Benz	34	(Italy) Enzo Trulli	R	1–4 (Note: Enzo Trulli was entered for round 4 but withdrew after parting ways with Drivex shortly before the start of the event. He was replaced by Joshua Dürksen.)
(Spain) Drivex School	Mercedes-Benz	34	(Paraguay) Joshua Dürksen	R	4
(Spain) Drivex School	Mercedes-Benz	34	(United Kingdom) Branden Lee Oxley	R	5
(Spain) Drivex School	Mercedes-Benz	35	(United States) Enzo Scionti	R	All
(Spain) Drivex School	Mercedes-Benz	78	(Chile) Nico Pino	R	7
(Spain) Drivex School	Mercedes-Benz	78	(United Kingdom) Dexter Patterson	G	8
(Italy) BVM Racing	Volkswagen	84	(Italy) Francesco Simonazzi	R	7–8

== Race calendar ==
A provisional seven-round calendar was announced on 26 September 2020, with the option to add another round at Hockenheimring. A plan to resurrect the Pau Grand Prix after it was cancelled in 2020 due to the COVID-19 pandemic did not come to fruition. The calendar was then further concretized on 3 December 2020, adding an event in Imola and leaving a ninth event to be announced. On 9 March 2021, the Portimão round shifted one week later, and it would be the official support round of the 2021 Portuguese Grand Prix. On 27 April 2021, it was confirmed that the series would be held over eight rounds.

In early 2021, it was announced that for the 2021 season the series would switch to a three-race format per round, with only one qualifying session and the other two race grids determined by a top-six reversed grid and the fastest laps from the first two races respectively.

Round		Circuit	Date	Pole position	Fastest lap	Most positions gained	Winning driver	Winning team	Rookie winner
1	R1	(Portugal) Algarve International Circuit	1 May	(United Kingdom) Louis Foster	(United States) Cameron Das	(Italy) Enzo Trulli	(United States) Cameron Das	(Germany) Team Motopark	(United Kingdom) Casper Stevenson
1	R2	(Portugal) Algarve International Circuit	1 May		(United Kingdom) Louis Foster	(United States) Cameron Das	(United States) Cameron Das	(Germany) Team Motopark	(United Kingdom) Casper Stevenson
1	R3	(Portugal) Algarve International Circuit	2 May		(United States) Cameron Das	(United States) Jak Crawford	(United States) Cameron Das	(Germany) Team Motopark	(Italy) Enzo Trulli
2	R1	(France) Circuit Paul Ricard	15 May	(United States) Jak Crawford	(United States) Jak Crawford	(United Kingdom) Casper Stevenson	(United States) Jak Crawford	(Germany) Team Motopark	(United States) Jak Crawford
2	R2	(France) Circuit Paul Ricard	16 May		(United States) Jak Crawford	(United States) Jak Crawford	(United States) Jak Crawford	(Germany) Team Motopark	(United States) Jak Crawford
2	R3	(France) Circuit Paul Ricard	16 May		(United States) Jak Crawford	(Malaysia) Nazim Azman	(United States) Cameron Das	(Germany) Team Motopark	(United States) Jak Crawford
3	R1	(Belgium) Circuit de Spa-Francorchamps	19 June	(United Kingdom) Louis Foster	(United Kingdom) Louis Foster	(Poland) Filip Kaminiarz	(United Kingdom) Louis Foster	(Japan) CryptoTower Racing	(United Kingdom) Casper Stevenson
3	R2	(Belgium) Circuit de Spa-Francorchamps	20 June		(United States) Cameron Das	(United States) Cameron Das	(United Kingdom) Louis Foster	(Japan) CryptoTower Racing	(Australia) Christian Mansell
3	R3	(Belgium) Circuit de Spa-Francorchamps	20 June		(United Kingdom) Louis Foster	(Poland) Filip Kaminiarz	(United Kingdom) Louis Foster	(Japan) CryptoTower Racing	(United Kingdom) Casper Stevenson
4	R1	(Hungary) Hungaroring	10 July	(United States) Jak Crawford	(United States) Jak Crawford	(United Kingdom) Josh Mason	(Turkey) Cem Bölükbaşı	(Netherlands) Van Amersfoort Racing	(Paraguay) Joshua Dürksen
4	R2	(Hungary) Hungaroring	10 July		(United States) Cameron Das	(United States) Jak Crawford	(United Kingdom) Casper Stevenson	(Netherlands) Van Amersfoort Racing	(United Kingdom) Casper Stevenson
4	R3	(Hungary) Hungaroring	11 July		(United Kingdom) Louis Foster	(United States) Jak Crawford	(United States) Cameron Das	(Germany) Team Motopark	(United States) Jak Crawford
5	R1	(Italy) Autodromo Internazionale Enzo e Dino Ferrari	24 July	(United States) Jak Crawford	(United States) Jak Crawford	(Portugal) Zdeněk Chovanec	(United States) Jak Crawford	(Germany) Team Motopark	(United States) Jak Crawford
5	R2	(Italy) Autodromo Internazionale Enzo e Dino Ferrari	24 July		(United States) Jak Crawford	(United Kingdom) Casper Stevenson	(Czech Republic) Roman Staněk	(Germany) Team Motopark	(United States) Jak Crawford
5	R3	(Italy) Autodromo Internazionale Enzo e Dino Ferrari	25 July		(United States) Jak Crawford	(United Kingdom) Branden Lee Oxley	(United States) Jak Crawford	(Germany) Team Motopark	(United States) Jak Crawford
6	R1	(Austria) Red Bull Ring	11 September	(United States) Jak Crawford	(United States) Jak Crawford	(Portugal) Zdeněk Chovanec	(United States) Jak Crawford	(Germany) Team Motopark	(United States) Jak Crawford
6	R2	(Austria) Red Bull Ring	12 September		(United States) Jak Crawford	(United Kingdom) Josh Mason	(Malaysia) Nazim Azman	(Japan) CryptoTower Racing	(United States) Jak Crawford
6	R3	(Austria) Red Bull Ring	12 September		(United States) Jak Crawford	(Italy) Enzo Trulli	(United States) Jak Crawford	(Germany) Team Motopark	(United States) Jak Crawford
7	R1	(Italy) Autodromo Nazionale di Monza	25 September	(United States) Cameron Das	(Turkey) Cem Bölükbaşı	(Turkey) Cem Bölükbaşı	(United States) Cameron Das	(Germany) Team Motopark	(Australia) Christian Mansell
7	R2	(Italy) Autodromo Nazionale di Monza	26 September		(Italy) Enzo Trulli	(Turkey) Cem Bölükbaşı	(United Kingdom) Casper Stevenson	(Netherlands) Van Amersfoort Racing	(United Kingdom) Casper Stevenson
7	R3	(Italy) Autodromo Nazionale di Monza	26 September		(United States) Cameron Das	(Italy) Francesco Simonazzi	(United States) Cameron Das	(Germany) Team Motopark	(Italy) Enzo Trulli
8	R1	(Spain) Circuit de Barcelona-Catalunya	23 October	(Turkey) Cem Bölükbaşı	(United States) Cameron Das	(United States) Brad Benavides	(Turkey) Cem Bölükbaşı	(Netherlands) Van Amersfoort Racing	(Italy) Enzo Trulli
8	R2	(Spain) Circuit de Barcelona-Catalunya	24 October		(United States) Jak Crawford	(Italy) Francesco Simonazzi	(United States) Jak Crawford	(Germany) Team Motopark	(United States) Jak Crawford
8	R3	(Spain) Circuit de Barcelona-Catalunya	24 October		(United States) Jak Crawford	(United States) Enzo Scionti	(United States) Jak Crawford	(Germany) Team Motopark	(United States) Jak Crawford

== Championship standings ==
In 2021, a rule was introduced that granted two extra points per race to the driver that gained the most positions.

=== Drivers' championship ===
- Points were awarded as follows:

1	2	3	4	5	6	7	8	9	10	PP	FL	PG
25	18	15	12	10	8	6	4	2	1	**1**	1	2*

Pos	Driver	POR (Portugal)			LEC (France)			SPA (Belgium)			HUN (Hungary)			IMO (Italy)			RBR (Austria)			MNZ (Italy)			CAT (Spain)			Pts
Pos	Driver	R1	R2	R3	R1	R2	R3	R1	R2	R3	R1	R2	R3	R1	R2	R3	R1	R2	R3	R1	R2	R3	R1	R2	R3	Pts
1	(United States) Cameron Das	1	1*	1	2	3	1	Ret	2*	2	Ret	10	1	5	13	3	3	4	2	**1**	5	1	2	5	2	382
2	(United Kingdom) Louis Foster	**2**	NC	2	3	2	6	**1**	1	1	7	4	6	2	5	4	2	3	3	Ret	14	Ret	5	2	3	315
3	(United States) Jak Crawford	DNP	DNP	7*	**1**	1*	2				**12**	6*	4*	**1**	2	1	**1**	5	1				6	1	1	304
4	(Malaysia) Nazim Azman	4	2	4	6	7	4*	2	3	3	6	2	3	11†	7	5	6	1	4	4	4	8	4	7	8	262
5	(Turkey) Cem Bölükbaşı										1	3	7	3	4	Ret	4	2	6	3*	2*	2	**1**	4	4	217
6	(United Kingdom) Casper Stevenson	5	3	6	5*	4	8	3	5	5	5	1	5	12	6*	8	8	7	5	6	1	10	9	8	9	214
7	(Italy) Enzo Trulli	6*	4	3	7	5	5	6	8	7	WD	WD	WD	8	12	Ret	9	Ret	10*	13	13	3	3	3	6	144
8	(Mexico) Rafael Villagómez	3	5	8	4	6	3				2	Ret	2	6	3	Ret	7	8	12				13	11	11	135
9	(United Kingdom) Josh Mason	8	6	5	8	12	7	Ret	6	8	4*	7	Ret	Ret	8	11	Ret	10*	7	12	12	11	7	15	7	89
10	(Poland) Filip Kaminiarz	9	10	10	Ret	9	12	4*	7	4*	8	8	10	Ret	Ret	9	13	12	11	5	3	9	12	9	16	80
11	(Australia) Christian Mansell							5	4	6										2	6	4	10	16	5	79
12	(Czech Republic) Roman Staněk													4	1	2										55
13	(United States) Brad Benavides																10	9	8	7	7	7	8*	6	14	39
14	(United States) Enzo Scionti	11	7	11	Ret	8	10	7	12	9	10	12	11	9†	10	10	12	13	9	10	8	Ret	15	14	12*	33
15	(Portugal) Zdeněk Chovanec	12	8	9	9	10	9	Ret	9	Ret	9	11	9	7*	11	7	11*	11	Ret							33
16	(France) Reshad de Gerus																5	6	13	11	9	5				30
17	(Paraguay) Joshua Dürksen										3	5	8													29
18	(Italy) Francesco Simonazzi																			9	10	6*	16	12*	15	15
19	(United Kingdom) Branden Lee Oxley													10	9	6*										13
20	(Hungary) Vivien Keszthelyi	10	9	12	10	11	11	8	10	10	11	9	Ret													12
21	(Germany) Andreas Estner	7	11	13																						6
22	(Chile) Nico Pino																			8	11	Ret				4
23	(Germany) Matthias Lüthen							Ret	11	11																0
Guest drivers ineligible to score points
—	(Mexico) Sebastián Álvarez																						11	10	10	—
—	(United Kingdom) Dexter Patterson																						14	13	13	—
Pos	Driver	R1	R2	R3	R1	R2	R3	R1	R2	R3	R1	R2	R3	R1	R2	R3	R1	R2	R3	R1	R2	R3	R1	R2	R3	Pts
Pos	Driver	POR (Portugal)			LEC (France)			SPA (Belgium)			HUN (Hungary)			IMO (Italy)			RBR (Austria)			MNZ (Italy)			CAT (Spain)			Pts

Colour	Result
Gold	Winner
Silver	Second place
Bronze	Third place
Green	Points classification
Blue	Non-points classification
Blue	Non-classified finish (NC)
Purple	Retired, not classified (Ret)
Red	Did not qualify (DNQ)
Red	Did not pre-qualify (DNPQ)
Black	Disqualified (DSQ)
White	Did not start (DNS)
White	Withdrew (WD)
White	Race cancelled (C)
Blank	Did not practice (DNP)
Blank	Did not arrive (DNA)
Blank	Excluded (EX)

**Bold** – Pole position
Italics – Fastest lap
† – Did not finish, but classified
* – Most positions gained

=== Rookies' championship ===
- Points were awarded as follows:

1	2	3	4	5
10	8	6	4	3

Pos	Driver	POR (Portugal)			LEC (France)			SPA (Belgium)			HUN (Hungary)			IMO (Italy)			RBR (Austria)			MNZ (Italy)			CAT (Spain)			Pts
Pos	Driver	R1	R2	R3	R1	R2	R3	R1	R2	R3	R1	R2	R3	R1	R2	R3	R1	R2	R3	R1	R2	R3	R1	R2	R3	Pts
1	(United Kingdom) Casper Stevenson	5	3	6	5	4	8	3	5	5	5	1	5	11	6	8	8	7	5	6	1	10	9	8	9	170
2	(United States) Jak Crawford	DNP	DNP	7	1	1	2				12	6	4	1	2	1	1	5	1				6	1	1	143
3	(Italy) Enzo Trulli	6	4	3	7	5	5	6	8	7	WD	WD	WD	8	12	Ret	9	Ret	10	13	13	3	3	3	6	114
4	(United States) Enzo Scionti	11	7	11	Ret	8	10	7	12	9	10	12	11	9†	10	10	12	13	9	10	8	Ret	15	14	12	82
5	(Portugal) Zdeněk Chovanec	12	8	9	9	10	9	Ret	9	Ret	9	11	9	7	11	7	11	11	Ret							68
6	(Australia) Christian Mansell							5	4	6										2	6	4	10	16	5	64
7	(Paraguay) Joshua Dürksen										3	5	8													24
8	(Italy) Francesco Simonazzi																			9	10	6	16	12	15	18
9	(United Kingdom) Branden Lee Oxley													10	9	6										17
10	(Chile) Nico Pino																			8	11	Ret				9
Pos	Driver	R1	R2	R3	R1	R2	R3	R1	R2	R3	R1	R2	R3	R1	R2	R3	R1	R2	R3	R1	R2	R3	R1	R2	R3	Pts
Pos	Driver	POR (Portugal)			LEC (France)			SPA (Belgium)			HUN (Hungary)			IMO (Italy)			RBR (Austria)			MNZ (Italy)			CAT (Spain)			Pts

=== Teams' championship ===
- Points were awarded as follows:

1	2	3	4	5
10	8	6	4	3

Pos	Driver	POR (Portugal)			LEC (France)			SPA (Belgium)			HUN (Hungary)			IMO (Italy)			RBR (Austria)			MNZ (Italy)			CAT (Spain)			Pts
Pos	Driver	R1	R2	R3	R1	R2	R3	R1	R2	R3	R1	R2	R3	R1	R2	R3	R1	R2	R3	R1	R2	R3	R1	R2	R3	Pts
1	(Germany) Team Motopark	1	1	1	1	1	1	8	2	2	11	6	1	1	1	1	1	4	1	1	5	1	2	1	1	277
1	(Germany) Team Motopark	10	9	7	2	3	2	Ret	10	10	12	9	4	4	2	2	3	5	2	2	6	4	6	5	2	277
2	(Japan) CryptoTower Racing	2	2	2	3	2	4	1	1	1	6	2	3	2	5	4	2	1	3	4	3	8	4	2	3	208
2	(Japan) CryptoTower Racing	4	10	4	6	7	6	2	3	3	7	4	6	11†	7	5	6	3	4	5	4	9	5	7	8	208
3	(Netherlands) Van Amersfoort Racing	3	3	6	4	4	3	3	5	5	1	1	2	3	3	8	4	2	5	3	1	2	1	4	4	173
3	(Netherlands) Van Amersfoort Racing	5	5	8	5	6	8				2	3	5	6	4	Ret	7	7	6	6	2	10	9	8	9	173
4	(United Kingdom) Carlin Motorsport							5	4	6				8	12	Ret	9	9	8	7	7	3	3	3	6	25
4	(United Kingdom) Carlin Motorsport																10	Ret	10	13	13	7	8	6	14	25
5	(Spain) Drivex School	6	4	3	7	5	5	6	8	7	3	5	8	9†	9	6	12	13	9	8	8	Ret	14	13	12	25
5	(Spain) Drivex School	11	7	11	Ret	8	10	7	12	9	10	12	11	10	10	10				10	11	Ret	15	14	13	25
6	(United Kingdom) Double R Racing	8	6	5	8	10	7	Ret	6	8	4	7	9	7	8	7	11	10	7	12	12	11	7	10	7	7
6	(United Kingdom) Double R Racing	12	8	9	9	12	9	Ret	9	Ret	9	11	Ret	Ret	11	11	Ret	11	Ret				11	15	10	7
7	(Italy) BVM Racing																			9	10	6	16	12	15	0
Pos	Driver	R1	R2	R3	R1	R2	R3	R1	R2	R3	R1	R2	R3	R1	R2	R3	R1	R2	R3	R1	R2	R3	R1	R2	R3	Pts
Pos	Driver	POR (Portugal)			LEC (France)			SPA (Belgium)			HUN (Hungary)			IMO (Italy)			RBR (Austria)			MNZ (Italy)			CAT (Spain)			Pts
