= 2021 Spielberg Formula 3 round =

Motor racing competition

(Austria) 2021 Spielberg Formula 3 round
Round details
- Round 3 of 7 in the 2021 FIA Formula 3 Championship.
- Location: Red Bull Ring; Spielberg, Styria, Austria
- Course: Permanent racing facility 4.318 km (2.683 mi)

Sprint race 1
- Date: 3 July 2021
- Laps: 24
Podium
First	(Norway) Dennis Hauger	Prema Racing
Second	(United Kingdom) Olli Caldwell	Prema Racing
Third	(Australia) Jack Doohan	Trident
Fastest lap
Driver	(Norway) Dennis Hauger	Prema Racing
- Time: 1:21.757 (on lap 5)

Sprint race 2
- Date: 3 July 2021
- Laps: 24
Podium
First	(Germany) David Schumacher	Trident
Second	(Denmark) Frederik Vesti	ART Grand Prix
Third	(Norway) Dennis Hauger	Prema Racing
Fastest lap
Driver	(Monaco) Arthur Leclerc	Prema Racing
- Time: 1:21.702 (on lap 14)

Feature race
- Date: 4 July 2021
- Laps: 24
Pole position
Driver	(Norway) Dennis Hauger	Prema Racing
Time	1:19.726	
Podium
First	(Denmark) Frederik Vesti	Trident
Second	(Norway) Dennis Hauger	Prema Racing
Third	(United Kingdom) Olli Caldwell	Prema Racing
Fastest lap
Driver	(France) Victor Martins	MP Motorsport
- Time: 1:21.737 (on lap 21)

The 2021 Spielberg Formula 3 round was the third round of the 2021 FIA Formula 3 Championship. It took place at the Red Bull Ring and featured three races in support of the 2021 Austrian Grand Prix from July 2 to 4.

== Classification ==
=== Qualifying ===
Caio Collet initially set the fastest lap, before it was soon deleted giving Dennis Hauger pole for race 3, and Logan Sargeant received pole for race 1.

Pos.	No.	Driver	Team	Time/Gap	Grid
1	1	(Norway) Dennis Hauger	Prema Racing	1:19.726	1
2	7	(Denmark) Frederik Vesti	ART Grand Prix	+0.028	2
3	8	(Russia) Aleksandr Smolyar	ART Grand Prix	+0.075	3
4	18	(Brazil) Caio Collet	MP Motorsport	+0.083	4
5	10	(United States) Jak Crawford	Hitech Grand Prix	+0.091	5
6	5	(France) Clément Novalak	Trident	+0.103	6
7	4	(Australia) Jack Doohan	Trident	+0.161	7
8	3	(United Kingdom) Olli Caldwell	Prema Racing	+0.174	8
9	2	(Monaco) Arthur Leclerc	Prema Racing	+0.249	9
10	17	(France) Victor Martins	MP Motorsport	+0.277	10
11	14	(Italy) Matteo Nannini	HWA Racelab	+0.344	11
12	29	(United States) Logan Sargeant	Charouz Racing System	+0.375	12
13	26	(Australia) Calan Williams	Jenzer Motorsport	+0.386	13
14	6	(Germany) David Schumacher	Trident	+0.422	14
15	30	(Brazil) Enzo Fittipaldi	Charouz Racing System	+0.462	15
16	24	(United States) Kaylen Frederick	Carlin Buzz Racing	+0.509	16
17	15	(Denmark) Oliver Rasmussen	HWA Racelab	+0.600	17
18	25	(United Kingdom) Jonny Edgar	Carlin Buzz Racing	+0.718	18
19	11	(Japan) Ayumu Iwasa	Hitech Grand Prix	+0.737	19
20	21	(Italy) Lorenzo Colombo	Campos Racing	+0.908	20
21	19	(Netherlands) Tijmen van der Helm	MP Motorsport	+0.946	21
22	12	(Czech Republic) Roman Staněk	Hitech Grand Prix	+0.950	25^{1}
23	22	(Belgium) Amaury Cordeel	Campos Racing	+0.954	22
24	9	(United States) Juan Manuel Correa	ART Grand Prix	+0.964	23
25	31	(France) Reshad de Gerus	Charouz Racing System	+1.036	24
26	16	(Mexico) Rafael Villagómez	HWA Racelab	+1.217	26
27	27	(United Kingdom) Johnathan Hoggard	Jenzer Motorsport	+1.352	27
28	20	(Hungary) László Tóth	Campos Racing	+1.566	28
29	28	(Romania) Filip Ugran	Jenzer Motorsport	+1.725	29
30	23	(Israel) Ido Cohen	Carlin Buzz Racing	+1.810	30
107% time: 1:25.307

Notes

- ^1 – Roman Staněk received a three-place grid-penalty after the session for impeding Lorenzo Colombo.

=== Sprint Race 1 ===
Pos.	No.	Driver	Team	Laps	Time/Gap	Grid	Pts.
1	1	(Norway) Dennis Hauger	Prema Racing	24	33:39.140	12	15 (2)
2	3	(United Kingdom) Olli Caldwell	Prema Racing	24	+5.460	5	12
3	4	(Australia) Jack Doohan	Trident	24	+6.506	6	10
4	30	(Brazil) Enzo Fittipaldi	Charouz Racing System	24	+8.677	15	8
5	17	(France) Victor Martins	MP Motorsport	24	+9.061	3	6
6	25	(United Kingdom) Jonny Edgar	Carlin Buzz Racing	24	+9.172	18	5
7	7	(Denmark) Frederik Vesti	ART Grand Prix	24	+9.285	11	4
8	10	(United States) Jak Crawford	Hitech Grand Prix	24	+9.743	8	3
9	24	(United States) Kaylen Frederick	Carlin Buzz Racing	24	+10.359	16	2
10	9	(United States) Juan Manuel Correa	ART Grand Prix	24	+10.678	23	1
11	12	(Czech Republic) Roman Staněk	Hitech Grand Prix	24	+11.086	25	
12	6	(Germany) David Schumacher	Trident	24	+11.688	14	
13	19	(Netherlands) Tijmen van der Helm	MP Motorsport	24	+12.135	21	
14	8	(Russia) Aleksandr Smolyar	ART Grand Prix	24	+13.014	10	
15	29	(United States) Logan Sargeant	Charouz Racing System	24	+13.092	1	
16	26	(Australia) Calan Williams	Jenzer Motorsport	24	+14.996	13	
17	18	(Brazil) Caio Collet	MP Motorsport	24	+15.248	9	
18	27	(United Kingdom) Johnathan Hoggard	Jenzer Motorsport	24	+20.148	27	
19	20	(Hungary) László Tóth	Campos Racing	24	+21.418	28	
20	31	(France) Reshad de Gerus	Charouz Racing System	24	+21.850	24	
21	16	(Mexico) Rafael Villagómez	HWA Racelab	24	+22.327	26	
22	22	(Belgium) Amaury Cordeel	Campos Racing	24	+25.605	22	
23	14	(Italy) Matteo Nannini	HWA Racelab	24	+27.250	2	
24	28	(Romania) Filip Ugran	Jenzer Motorsport	24	+28.578	29	
25	21	(Italy) Lorenzo Colombo	Campos Racing	24	+1:06.745	20	
26	15	(Denmark) Oliver Rasmussen	HWA Racelab	24	+1:12.841	17	
DNF	5	(France) Clément Novalak	Trident	20	Collision damage	7	
DNF	2	(Monaco) Arthur Leclerc	Prema Racing	10	Puncture	4	
DNF	23	(Israel) Ido Cohen	Carlin Buzz Racing	5	Mechanical	30	
DSQ	11	(Japan) Ayumu Iwasa	Hitech Grand Prix	24	Disqualified	19	

=== Sprint Race 2 ===
Pos.	No.	Driver	Team	Laps	Time/Gap	Grid	Pts.
1	6	(Germany) David Schumacher	Trident	24	35:26.498	1	15
2	7	(Denmark) Frederik Vesti	ART Grand Prix	24	+2.009	6	12
3	1	(Norway) Dennis Hauger	Prema Racing	24	+2.536	12	10
4	12	(Czech Republic) Roman Staněk	Hitech Grand Prix	24	+3.404	2	8
5	25	(United Kingdom) Jonny Edgar	Carlin Buzz Racing	24	+5.108	7	6
6	2	(Monaco) Arthur Leclerc	Prema Racing	24	+5.816	27	5 (2)
7	4	(Australia) Jack Doohan	Trident	24	+6.641	10	4
8	30	(Brazil) Enzo Fittipaldi	Charouz Racing System	24	+6.995	9	3
9	3	(United Kingdom) Olli Caldwell	Prema Racing	24	+7.377	11	2
10	27	(United Kingdom) Johnathan Hoggard	Jenzer Motorsport	24	+8.272	18	1
11	22	(Belgium) Amaury Cordeel	Campos Racing	24	+9.720	22	
12	14	(Italy) Matteo Nannini	HWA Racelab	24	+11.253	23	
13	5	(France) Clément Novalak	Trident	24	+11.501	30	
14	11	(Japan) Ayumu Iwasa	Hitech Grand Prix	24	+12.576	29	
15	26	(Australia) Calan Williams	Jenzer Motorsport	24	+13.191	16	
16	15	(Denmark) Oliver Rasmussen	HWA Racelab	24	+18.396	26	
17	18	(Brazil) Caio Collet	MP Motorsport	24	+19.025	17	
18	16	(Mexico) Rafael Villagómez	HWA Racelab	24	+19.636	21	
19	21	(Italy) Lorenzo Colombo	Campos Racing	24	+21.231	25	
20	23	(Israel) Ido Cohen	Carlin Buzz Racing	24	+22.776	28	
21	20	(Hungary) László Tóth	Campos Racing	24	+23.624	19	
22	28	(Romania) Filip Ugran	Jenzer Motorsport	24	+24.187	24	
23	31	(France) Reshad de Gerus	Charouz Racing System	24	+24.462	20	
24	9	(United States) Juan Manuel Correa	ART Grand Prix	24	+29.078	3	
25	8	(Russia) Aleksandr Smolyar	ART Grand Prix	24	+1:15.296	14	
26	17	(France) Victor Martins	MP Motorsport	22	Engine	8	
DNF	24	(United States) Kaylen Frederick	Carlin Buzz Racing	11	Injury after collision	4	
DNF	10	(United States) Jak Crawford	Hitech Grand Prix	10	Mechanical	5	
DNF	19	(Netherlands) Tijmen van der Helm	MP Motorsport	1	Collision	13	
DNF	29	(United States) Logan Sargeant	Charouz Racing System	1	Collision	15	

=== Feature Race ===
Pos.	No.	Driver	Team	Laps	Time/Gap	Grid	Pts.
1	7	(Denmark) Frederik Vesti	ART Grand Prix	24	36:17.937	2	25
2	1	(Norway) Dennis Hauger	Prema Racing	24	+1.124	1	18 (4)
3	3	(United Kingdom) Olli Caldwell	Prema Racing	24	+1.741	8	15
4	8	(Russia) Aleksandr Smolyar	ART Grand Prix	24	+2.258	3	12
5	14	(Italy) Matteo Nannini	HWA Racelab	24	+4.147	11	10
6	11	(Japan) Ayumu Iwasa	Hitech Grand Prix	24	+5.163	19	8
7	18	(Brazil) Caio Collet	MP Motorsport	24	+6.785	4	6
8	29	(United States) Logan Sargeant	Charouz Racing System	24	+7.561	12	4
9	26	(Australia) Calan Williams	Jenzer Motorsport	24	+8.320	13	2
10	25	(United Kingdom) Jonny Edgar	Carlin Buzz Racing	24	+9.049	18	1
11	6	(Germany) David Schumacher	Trident	24	+9.605	14	
12	12	(Czech Republic) Roman Staněk	Hitech Grand Prix	24	+10.782	25	
13	21	(Italy) Lorenzo Colombo	Campos Racing	24	+11.319	20	
14	9	(United States) Juan Manuel Correa	ART Grand Prix	24	+11.645	23	
15	30	(Brazil) Enzo Fittipaldi	Charouz Racing System	24	+15.328	15	
16	23	(Israel) Ido Cohen	Carlin Buzz Racing	24	+15.583	30	
17	31	(France) Reshad de Gerus	Charouz Racing System	24	+16.202	24	
18	22	(Belgium) Amaury Cordeel	Campos Racing	24	+16.358	22	
19	16	(Mexico) Rafael Villagómez	HWA Racelab	24	+17.850	26	
20	19	(Netherlands) Tijmen van der Helm	MP Motorsport	24	+18.049	21	
21	20	(Hungary) László Tóth	Campos Racing	24	+19.104	28	
22	15	(Denmark) Oliver Rasmussen	HWA Racelab	24	+19.288	17	
23	28	(Romania) Filip Ugran	Jenzer Motorsport	24	+37.200	29	
24	17	(France) Victor Martins	MP Motorsport	24	+43.050	10	
25	27	(United Kingdom) Johnathan Hoggard	Jenzer Motorsport	24	+14.677	27	
26	10	(United States) Jak Crawford	Hitech Grand Prix	24	+1:15.956	5	
27	4	(Australia) Jack Doohan	Trident	23	+1 Lap	7	
DNF	5	(France) Clément Novalak	Trident	13	Collision	6	
DNF	2	(Monaco) Arthur Leclerc	Prema Racing	13	Collision	9	
WD	24	(United States) Kaylen Frederick	Carlin Buzz Racing	—	Injury^{1}	16	

Note:

- ^1 - Kaylen Frederick was declared unfit for the Feature Race due to a broken wrist sustained in the second Sprint Race after a collision with fellow compatriot Juan Manuel Correa.

== Standings after the event ==
Drivers' Championship standings

	Pos.	Driver	Points
	1	(Norway) Dennis Hauger	115
6	2	(Denmark) Frederik Vesti	74
	3	(Australia) Jack Doohan	72
1	4	(United Kingdom) Olli Caldwell	70
3	5	(France) Victor Martins	66

Teams' Championship standings

	Pos.	Team	Points
	1	(Italy) Prema Racing	207
	2	(Italy) Trident	136
1	3	(France) ART Grand Prix	135
1	4	(Netherlands) MP Motorsport	107
	5	(United Kingdom) Hitech Grand Prix	38

- Note: Only the top five positions are included for both sets of standings.

== See also ==
- 2021 Austrian Grand Prix

Previous round: 2021 Le Castellet Formula 3 round	FIA Formula 3 Championship; 2021 season	Next round: 2021 Budapest Formula 3 round
Previous round: 2020 2nd Spielberg Formula 3 round	Spielberg Formula 3 round	Next round: 2022 Spielberg Formula 3 round
