= 2021 Spa-Francorchamps Formula 3 round =

(Belgium) 2021 Spa-Francorchamps Formula 3 round
Round details
- Round 5 of 7 in the 2021 FIA Formula 3 Championship.
- Location: Circuit de Spa-Francorchamps; Stavelot, Belgium
- Course: Permanent Circuit; 7.004 km (4.352 mi)

Sprint race 1
- Date: 28 August 2021
- Laps: 15
Podium
First	(Italy) Lorenzo Colombo	Campos Racing
Second	(United States) Jak Crawford	Hitech Grand Prix
Third	(Czech Republic) Roman Staněk	Hitech Grand Prix
Fastest lap
Driver	(Italy) Lorenzo Colombo	Campos Racing
- Time: 2:22.799 (on lap 11)

Sprint race 2
- Date: 28 August 2021
- Laps: 16
Podium
First	(Australia) Jack Doohan	Trident
Second	(Germany) David Schumacher	Trident
Third	(United States) Logan Sargeant	Charouz Racing System
Fastest lap
Driver	(France) Clément Novalak	Trident
- Time: 2:24.940 (on 9)

Feature race
- Date: 29 August 2021
- Laps: 14
Pole position
Driver	(Australia) Jack Doohan	Trident
Time	2:21.953	
Podium
First	(Australia) Jack Doohan	Trident
Second	(France) Victor Martins	MP Motorsport
Third	(Russia) Aleksandr Smolyar	ART Grand Prix
Fastest lap
Driver	(Italy) Matteo Nannini	HWA Racelab
- Time: 1:42.442 (on lap 17)

The 2021 Spa-Francorchamps Formula 3 round was the fifth round of the 2021 FIA Formula 3 Championship. It took place at the Circuit de Spa-Francorchamps and featured three races on the 28 August and 29 August in support of the 2021 Belgian Grand Prix.

With Jack Doohan winning both Sprint Race 2 and Feature Race respectively, it marked the first time in the series' history that a driver was able to win two races in a weekend.

== Classification ==
=== Qualifying ===
Pos.	No.	Driver	Team	Time/Gap	Grid
1	4	(Australia) Jack Doohan	Trident	2:21.953	1
2	17	(France) Victor Martins	MP Motorsport	+0.704	2
3	8	(Russia) Aleksandr Smolyar	ART Grand Prix	+0.769	3
4	18	(Brazil) Caio Collet	MP Motorsport	+0.783	4
5	29	(United States) Logan Sargeant	Charouz Racing System	+0.822	5
6	5	(France) Clément Novalak	Trident	+0.858	6
7	7	(Denmark) Frederik Vesti	ART Grand Prix	+1.315	7
8	6	(Germany) David Schumacher	Trident	+1.800	8
9	27	(United Kingdom) Johnathan Hoggard	Jenzer Motorsport	+1.832	9
10	12	(Czech Republic) Roman Staněk	Hitech Grand Prix	+1.863	10
11	10	(United States) Jak Crawford	Hitech Grand Prix	+2.011	11
12	21	(Italy) Lorenzo Colombo	Campos Racing	+2.109	12
13	2	(Monaco) Arthur Leclerc	Prema Racing	+2.301	13
14	1	(Norway) Dennis Hauger	Prema Racing	+2.335	14
15	14	(Italy) Matteo Nannini	HWA Racelab	+2.435	15
16	16	(Mexico) Rafael Villagómez	HWA Racelab	+2.750	16
17	11	(Japan) Ayumu Iwasa	Hitech Grand Prix	+2.895	17
18	3	(United Kingdom) Olli Caldwell	Prema Racing	+3.072	18
19	26	(Australia) Calan Williams	Jenzer Motorsport	+3.124	19
20	25	(United Kingdom) Jonny Edgar	Carlin Buzz Racing	+3.185	20
21	19	(Netherlands) Tijmen van der Helm	MP Motorsport	+3.219	21
22	22	(Belgium) Amaury Cordeel	Campos Racing	+3.433	22
23	15	(Denmark) Oliver Rasmussen	HWA Racelab	+3.660	23
24	23	(Israel) Ido Cohen	Carlin Buzz Racing	+3.943	24
25	20	(Hungary) László Tóth	Campos Racing	+4.008	25
26	30	(United States) Hunter Yeany	Charouz Racing System	+4.116	26
27	9	(United States) Juan Manuel Correa	ART Grand Prix	+4.272	27
28	31	(Portugal) Zdeněk Chovanec	Charouz Racing System	+4.762	28
-	28	(Romania) Filip Ugran	Jenzer Motorsport	No Time Set	PL

=== Sprint Race 1 ===
Pos.	No.	Driver	Team	Laps	Time/Gap	Grid	Pts.
1	21	(Italy) Lorenzo Colombo	Campos Racing	15	38:46.686	1	15 (2)
2	10	(United States) Jak Crawford	Hitech Grand Prix	15	+13.471	2	12
3	12	(Czech Republic) Roman Staněk	Hitech Grand Prix	15	+15.487	3	10
4	7	(Denmark) Frederik Vesti	ART Grand Prix	15	+19.099	6	8
5	17	(France) Victor Martins	MP Motorsport	15	+21.157	11	6
6	27	(United Kingdom) Johnathan Hoggard	Jenzer Motorsport	15	+23.665	4	5
7	5	(France) Clément Novalak	Trident	15	+24.493	7	4
8	29	(United States) Logan Sargeant	Charouz Racing System	15	+24.544	8	3
9	18	(Brazil) Caio Collet	MP Motorsport	15	+25.275	9	2
10	8	(Russia) Aleksandr Smolyar	ART Grand Prix	15	+25.467	10	1
11	6	(Germany) David Schumacher	Trident	15	+25.967	5	
12	4	(Australia) Jack Doohan	Trident	15	+26.911	12	
13	2	(Monaco) Arthur Leclerc	Prema Racing	15	+28.367	13	
14	1	(Norway) Dennis Hauger	Prema Racing	15	+30.018	14	
15	11	(Japan) Ayumu Iwasa	Hitech Grand Prix	15	+31.487	17	
16	3	(United Kingdom) Olli Caldwell	Prema Racing	15	+44.348	18	
17	22	(Belgium) Amaury Cordeel	Campos Racing	15	+46.430	22	
18	30	(United States) Hunter Yeany	Charouz Racing System	15	+50.707	26	
19	14	(Italy) Matteo Nannini	HWA Racelab	15	+53.472	15	
20	15	(Denmark) Oliver Rasmussen	HWA Racelab	15	+57.012	23	
21	25	(United Kingdom) Jonny Edgar	Carlin Buzz Racing	15	+57.637	20	
22	9	(United States) Juan Manuel Correa	ART Grand Prix	15	+58.493	27	
23	19	(Netherlands) Tijmen van der Helm	MP Motorsport	15	+59.173	21	
24	26	(Australia) Calan Williams	Jenzer Motorsport	15	+1:00.649	19	
25	20	(Hungary) László Tóth	Campos Racing	15	+1:04.853	25	
26	31	(Portugal) Zdeněk Chovanec	Charouz Racing System	15	+1:08.490	28	
27	16	(Mexico) Rafael Villagómez	HWA Racelab	15	+2:12.652	16	
28	28	(Romania) Filip Ugran	Jenzer Motorsport	14	Mechanical	PL	
DNF	23	(Israel) Ido Cohen	Carlin Buzz Racing	4	Mechanical	24	
Fastest lap set by (Italy) Lorenzo Colombo: 2:22.799 (lap 11)

=== Sprint Race 2 ===
Pos.	No.	Driver	Team	Laps	Time/Gap	Grid	Pts.
1	4	(Australia) Jack Doohan	Trident	16	45:11.332	1	15
2	6	(Germany) David Schumacher	Trident	16	+0.488	2	12
3	29	(United States) Logan Sargeant	Charouz Racing System	16	+1.093	5	10
4	18	(Brazil) Caio Collet	MP Motorsport	16	+1.965	4	8
5	5	(France) Clément Novalak	Trident	16	+2.780	6	6 (2)
6	7	(Denmark) Frederik Vesti	ART Grand Prix	16	+3.049	9	5
7	17	(France) Victor Martins	MP Motorsport	16	+3.580	8	4
8	8	(Russia) Aleksandr Smolyar	ART Grand Prix	16	+4.330	3	3
9	1	(Norway) Dennis Hauger	Prema Racing	16	+4.946	14	2
10	2	(Monaco) Arthur Leclerc	Prema Racing	16	+6.459	13	1
11	11	(Japan) Ayumu Iwasa	Hitech Grand Prix	16	+7.194	15	
12	10	(United States) Jak Crawford	Hitech Grand Prix	16	+7.546	11	
13	12	(Czech Republic) Roman Staněk	Hitech Grand Prix	16	+8.988	10	
14	21	(Italy) Lorenzo Colombo	Campos Racing	16	+9.690	12	
15	3	(United Kingdom) Olli Caldwell	Prema Racing	16	+10.756	16	
16	19	(Netherlands) Tijmen van der Helm	MP Motorsport	16	+11.488	23	
17	25	(United Kingdom) Jonny Edgar	Carlin Buzz Racing	16	+12.457	21	
18	9	(United States) Juan Manuel Correa	ART Grand Prix	16	+13.638	22	
19	28	(Romania) Filip Ugran	Jenzer Motorsport	16	+14.086	28	
20	23	(Israel) Ido Cohen	Carlin Buzz Racing	16	+14.956	29	
21	15	(Denmark) Oliver Rasmussen	HWA Racelab	16	+15.881	20	
22	20	(Hungary) László Tóth	Campos Racing	16	+16.286	25	
23	16	(Mexico) Rafael Villagómez	HWA Racelab	16	+17.404	27	
24	27	(United Kingdom) Johnathan Hoggard	Jenzer Motorsport	16	+19.666	7	
25	30	(United States) Hunter Yeany	Charouz Racing System	16	+23.279	18	
26	31	(Portugal) Zdeněk Chovanec	Charouz Racing System	16	+27.045	26	
DNF	22	(Belgium) Amaury Cordeel	Campos Racing	13	Collision	17	
DNF	26	(Australia) Calan Williams	Jenzer Motorsport	13	Collision	24	
DNF	14	(Italy) Matteo Nannini	HWA Racelab	9	Stalled after collision	19	
Fastest lap set by (France) Clément Novalak: 2:24.940 (lap 9)

=== Feature Race ===
Pos.	No.	Driver	Team	Laps	Time/Gap	Grid	Pts.
1	4	(Australia) Jack Doohan	Trident	14	33:52.417	1	25 (4)
2	17	(France) Victor Martins	MP Motorsport	14	+2.001	2	18 (2)
3	8	(Russia) Aleksandr Smolyar	ART Grand Prix	14	+12.205	3	15
4	18	(Brazil) Caio Collet	MP Motorsport	14	+13.316	4	12
5	5	(France) Clément Novalak	Trident	14	+14.383	6	10
6	7	(Denmark) Frederik Vesti	ART Grand Prix	14	+15.959	7	8
7	29	(United States) Logan Sargeant	Charouz Racing System	14	+17.705	5	6
8	1	(Norway) Dennis Hauger	Prema Racing	14	+18.359	14	4
9	6	(Germany) David Schumacher	Trident	14	+20.996	8	2
10	2	(Monaco) Arthur Leclerc	Prema Racing	14	+22.940	13	1
11	3	(United Kingdom) Olli Caldwell	Prema Racing	14	+30.230	18	
12	10	(United States) Jak Crawford	Hitech Grand Prix	14	+35.466	11	
13	11	(Japan) Ayumu Iwasa	Hitech Grand Prix	14	+37.487	17	
14	21	(Italy) Lorenzo Colombo	Campos Racing	14	+38.091	12	
15	12	(Czech Republic) Roman Staněk	Hitech Grand Prix	14	+43.686	10	
16	27	(United Kingdom) Johnathan Hoggard	Jenzer Motorsport	14	+45.687	9	
17	15	(Denmark) Oliver Rasmussen	HWA Racelab	14	+50.013	23	
18	26	(Australia) Calan Williams	Jenzer Motorsport	14	+52.941	19	
19	25	(United Kingdom) Jonny Edgar	Carlin Buzz Racing	14	+54.400	20	
20	23	(Israel) Ido Cohen	Carlin Buzz Racing	14	+55.057	24	
21	9	(United States) Juan Manuel Correa	ART Grand Prix	14	+55.654	27	
22	19	(Netherlands) Tijmen van der Helm	MP Motorsport	14	+54.192	21	
23	20	(Hungary) László Tóth	Campos Racing	14	+1:01.370	25	
24	31	(Portugal) Zdeněk Chovanec	Charouz Racing System	14	+1:03.391	28	
25	28	(Romania) Filip Ugran	Jenzer Motorsport	14	+1:18.617	PL	
26	14	(Italy) Matteo Nannini	HWA Racelab	14	+2:13.964	15	
DNF	30	(United States) Hunter Yeany	Charouz Racing System	11	Retired	26	
DNF	22	(Belgium) Amaury Cordeel	Campos Racing	11	Retired	22	
DNF	16	(Mexico) Rafael Villagómez	HWA Racelab	1	Collision damage	16	
Fastest lap set by (Italy) Matteo Nannini: 1:42.442 (lap 17)

== Standings after the event ==
Drivers' Championship standings

	Pos.	Driver	Points
	1	(Norway) Dennis Hauger	158
	2	(Australia) Jack Doohan	133
1	3	(Denmark) Frederik Vesti	101
3	4	(France) Victor Martins	96
	5	(Russia) Aleksandr Smolyar	92

Teams' Championship standings

Pos.	Team	Points
1	(Italy) Prema Racing	290
2	(Italy) Trident	274
3	(France) ART Grand Prix	202
4	(Netherlands) MP Motorsport	159
5	(United Kingdom) Hitech Grand Prix	86

- Note: Only the top five positions are included for both sets of standings.

== See also ==
- 2021 Belgian Grand Prix

Previous round: 2021 Budapest Formula 3 round	FIA Formula 3 Championship; 2021 season	Next round: 2021 Zandvoort Formula 3 round
Previous round: 2020 Spa-Francorchamps Formula 3 round	Spa-Francorchamps Formula 3 round	Next round: 2022 Spa-Francorchamps Formula 3 round
