= 2021 Budapest Formula 3 round =

Motor racing competition

(Hungary) 2021 Budapest Formula 3 round
Round details
- Round 4 of 7 in the 2021 FIA Formula 3 Championship.
- Location: Hungaroring; Mogyoród, Hungary
- Course: Permanent Circuit; 4.381 km (2.722 mi)

Sprint race 1
- Date: 31 July 2021
- Laps: 22
Podium
First	(Japan) Ayumu Iwasa	Hitech Grand Prix
Second	(United Kingdom) Olli Caldwell	Prema Racing
Third	(United States) Logan Sargeant	Charouz Racing System
Fastest lap
Driver	(Italy) Lorenzo Colombo	Campos Racing
- Time: 1:35.330 (on lap 8)

Sprint race 2
- Date: 31 July 2021
- Laps: 22
Podium
First	(Italy) Matteo Nannini	HWA Racelab
Second	(Brazil) Enzo Fittipaldi	Charouz Racing System
Third	(Czech Republic) Roman Staněk	Hitech Grand Prix
Fastest lap
Driver	(United Kingdom) Olli Caldwell	Prema Racing
- Time: 1:35.316 (on lap 12)

Feature race
- Date: 1 August 2021
- Laps: 20
Pole position
Driver	(Monaco) Arthur Leclerc	Prema Racing
Time	1:33.164	
Podium
First	(Norway) Dennis Hauger	Prema Racing
Second	(Monaco) Arthur Leclerc	Prema Racing
Third	(Australia) Jack Doohan	Trident
Fastest lap
Driver	(Italy) Matteo Nannini	HWA Racelab
- Time: 1:42.442 (on lap 17)

The 2021 Budapest Formula 3 round was the fourth round of the 2021 FIA Formula 3 Championship. It took place at the Hungaroring and featured three races on the 31 July and 1 August in support of the 2021 Hungarian Grand Prix.

== Classification ==
=== Qualifying ===
Pos.	No.	Driver	Team	Time/Gap	Grid
1	2	(Monaco) Arthur Leclerc	Prema Racing	1:33.164	1
2	1	(Norway) Dennis Hauger	Prema Racing	+0.089	2
3	4	(Australia) Jack Doohan	Trident	+0.096	3
4	6	(Germany) David Schumacher	Trident	+0.120	4
5	5	(France) Clément Novalak	Trident	+0.167	5
6	8	(Russia) Aleksandr Smolyar	ART Grand Prix	+0.265	6
7	7	(Denmark) Frederik Vesti	ART Grand Prix	+0.285	7
8	29	(United States) Logan Sargeant	Charouz Racing System	+0.468	8
9	3	(United Kingdom) Olli Caldwell	Prema Racing	+0.540	9
10	11	(Japan) Ayumu Iwasa	Hitech Grand Prix	+0.613	10
11	21	(Italy) Lorenzo Colombo	Campos Racing	+0.641	11
12	25	(United Kingdom) Jonny Edgar	Carlin Buzz Racing	+0.714	12
13	14	(Italy) Matteo Nannini	HWA Racelab	+0.840	13
14	9	(United States) Juan Manuel Correa	ART Grand Prix	+0.858	14
15	12	(Czech Republic) Roman Staněk	Hitech Grand Prix	+0.861	15
16	26	(Australia) Calan Williams	Jenzer Motorsport	+0.873	16
17	30	(Brazil) Enzo Fittipaldi	Charouz Racing System	+0.907	17
18	24	(United Kingdom) Jake Hughes	Carlin Buzz Racing	+0.949	18
19	22	(Belgium) Amaury Cordeel	Campos Racing	+0.960	19
20	19	(Netherlands) Tijmen van der Helm	MP Motorsport	+1.078	20
21	15	(Denmark) Oliver Rasmussen	HWA Racelab	+1.086	21
22	10	(United States) Jak Crawford	Hitech Grand Prix	+1.092	22
23	27	(United Kingdom) Johnathan Hoggard	Jenzer Motorsport	+1.221	23
24	17	(France) Victor Martins	MP Motorsport	+1.354	24
25	18	(Brazil) Caio Collet	MP Motorsport	+1.421	25
26	23	(Israel) Ido Cohen	Carlin Buzz Racing	+1.450	26
27	31	(France) Reshad de Gerus	Charouz Racing System	+1.623	27
28	16	(Mexico) Rafael Villagómez	HWA Racelab	+1.723	28
29	20	(Hungary) László Tóth	Campos Racing	+1.752	29
30	28	(Romania) Filip Ugran	Jenzer Motorsport	+1.904	30

=== Sprint Race 1 ===
Pos.	No.	Driver	Team	Laps	Time/Gap	Grid	Pts.
1	11	(Japan) Ayumu Iwasa	Hitech Grand Prix	22	37:10.923	3	15
2	3	(United Kingdom) Olli Caldwell	Prema Racing	22	+0.210	4	12
3	29	(United States) Logan Sargeant	Charouz Racing System	22	+0.937	5	10
4	5	(France) Clément Novalak	Trident	22	+1.410	7	8
5	1	(Norway) Dennis Hauger	Prema Racing	22	+1.791	11	6
6	8	(Russia) Aleksandr Smolyar	ART Grand Prix	22	+3.129	6	5
7	21	(Italy) Lorenzo Colombo	Campos Racing	22	+3.175^{1}	2	4 (2)
8	6	(Germany) David Schumacher	Trident	22	+4.635	8	3
9	4	(Australia) Jack Doohan	Trident	22	+5.758	10	2
10	14	(Italy) Matteo Nannini	HWA Racelab	22	+6.012	12	1
11	12	(Czech Republic) Roman Staněk	Hitech Grand Prix	22	+6.540	14	
12	30	(Brazil) Enzo Fittipaldi	Charouz Racing System	22	+7.734	17	
13	2	(Monaco) Arthur Leclerc	Prema Racing	22	+7.801	15^{2}	
14	9	(United States) Juan Manuel Correa	ART Grand Prix	22	+8.747	13	
15	17	(France) Victor Martins	MP Motorsport	22	+9.614	24	
16	24	(United Kingdom) Jake Hughes	Carlin Buzz Racing	22	+10.108	18	
17	26	(Australia) Calan Williams	Jenzer Motorsport	22	+10.465	16	
18	15	(Denmark) Oliver Rasmussen	HWA Racelab	22	+11.863	21	
19	22	(Belgium) Amaury Cordeel	Campos Racing	22	+11.948	19	
20	18	(Brazil) Caio Collet	MP Motorsport	22	+12.440	25	
21	19	(Netherlands) Tijmen van der Helm	MP Motorsport	22	+12.699	20	
22	27	(United Kingdom) Johnathan Hoggard	Jenzer Motorsport	22	+13.559	23	
23	16	(Mexico) Rafael Villagómez	HWA Racelab	22	+14.802	28	
24	31	(France) Reshad de Gerus	Charouz Racing System	22	+15.308	27	
25	28	(Romania) Filip Ugran	Jenzer Motorsport	22	+16.211	30	
26	10	(United States) Jak Crawford	Hitech Grand Prix	22	+16.622	22	
27	20	(Hungary) László Tóth	Campos Racing	22	+17.827	29	
28	23	(Israel) Ido Cohen	Carlin Buzz Racing	21	Collision	26	
DNF	7	(Denmark) Frederik Vesti	ART Grand Prix	15	Mechanical	9^{3}	
DNF	25	(United Kingdom) Jonny Edgar	Carlin Buzz Racing	7	Engine	1	
Fastest lap set by (Italy) Lorenzo Colombo: 1:35.330 (lap 8)

Notes

- ^1 – Lorenzo Colombo originally finished the race in first, but due to him having driven more than ten car lengths behind the Safety Car prior to the car turning its lights out for the restart he received a five-second penalty, demoting him to seventh.
- ^2 – Arthur Leclerc was given a three-place grid penalty for the first race after causing a collision with Victor Martins and Clément Novalak at the previous race.
- ^3 – Frederik Vesti was given a three-place grid penalty for the first race after driving unnecessarily slowly between turns 12 and 14 in qualifying.

=== Sprint Race 2 ===
Pos.	No.	Driver	Team	Laps	Time/Gap	Grid	Pts.
1	14	(Italy) Matteo Nannini	HWA Racelab	22	35:26.725	3	15
2	30	(Brazil) Enzo Fittipaldi	Charouz Racing System	22	+2.519	1	12
3	12	(Czech Republic) Roman Staněk	Hitech Grand Prix	22	+3.836	2	10
4	8	(Russia) Aleksandr Smolyar	ART Grand Prix	22	+4.348	7	8
5	1	(Norway) Dennis Hauger	Prema Racing	22	+4.622	8	6
6	6	(Germany) David Schumacher	Trident	22	+5.607	5	5
7	21	(Italy) Lorenzo Colombo	Campos Racing	22	+7.013	6	4
8	5	(France) Clément Novalak	Trident	22	+8.900	9	3
9	29	(United States) Logan Sargeant	Charouz Racing System	22	+11.815	10	2
10	11	(Japan) Ayumu Iwasa	Hitech Grand Prix	22	+12.632	12	1
11	2	(Monaco) Arthur Leclerc	Prema Racing	22	+12.918	13	
12	18	(Brazil) Caio Collet	MP Motorsport	22	+13.706	20	
13	4	(Australia) Jack Doohan	Trident	22	+17.611	4	
14	9	(United States) Juan Manuel Correa	ART Grand Prix	22	+18.039	14	
15	19	(Netherlands) Tijmen van der Helm	MP Motorsport	22	+20.230	21	
16	7	(Denmark) Frederik Vesti	ART Grand Prix	22	+22.849	28	
17	24	(United Kingdom) Jake Hughes	Carlin Buzz Racing	22	+25.634	16	
18	31	(France) Reshad de Gerus	Charouz Racing System	22	+28.351	24	
19	28	(Romania) Filip Ugran	Jenzer Motorsport	22	+32.100	25	
20	10	(United States) Jak Crawford	Hitech Grand Prix	22	+33.308	30^{1}	
21	16	(Mexico) Rafael Villagómez	HWA Racelab	22	+35.037	23	
22	27	(United Kingdom) Johnathan Hoggard	Jenzer Motorsport	22	+35.084^{2}	22	
23	20	(Hungary) László Tóth	Campos Racing	22	+35.451	26	
24	26	(Australia) Calan Williams	Jenzer Motorsport	22	+36.564	17	
25	17	(France) Victor Martins	MP Motorsport	22	+37.374	15	
26	25	(United Kingdom) Jonny Edgar	Carlin Buzz Racing	22	+44.223	29	
27	23	(Israel) Ido Cohen	Carlin Buzz Racing	22	+1:09.932	27	
28	15	(Denmark) Oliver Rasmussen	HWA Racelab	22	+1:25.608	18	
29	3	(United Kingdom) Olli Caldwell	Prema Racing	21	+1 Lap	11	
DNF	22	(Belgium) Amaury Cordeel	Campos Racing	2	Retired	19	
Fastest lap set by (United Kingdom) Olli Caldwell: 1:35.316 (lap 12)

Notes

- ^1 – Jak Crawford was given a five-place grid drop due to him causing a collision with Ido Cohen in the first race, moving him to the back of the grid.
- ^2 – Johnathan Hoggard received a five-second penalty for forcing Tijmen van der Helm off the track.

=== Feature Race ===
Pos.	No.	Driver	Team	Laps	Time/Gap	Grid	Pts.
1	1	(Norway) Dennis Hauger	Prema Racing	20	40:15.030	2	25
2	2	(Monaco) Arthur Leclerc	Prema Racing	20	+1.345	1	18 (4)
3	4	(Australia) Jack Doohan	Trident	20	+2.203	3	15
4	6	(Germany) David Schumacher	Trident	20	+2.736	4	12
5	5	(France) Clément Novalak	Trident	20	+3.268	5	10
6	8	(Russia) Aleksandr Smolyar	ART Grand Prix	20	+3.405	6	8
7	7	(Denmark) Frederik Vesti	ART Grand Prix	20	+3.659	7	6
8	3	(United Kingdom) Olli Caldwell	Prema Racing	20	+4.964	9	4
9	30	(Brazil) Enzo Fittipaldi	Charouz Racing System	20	+5.242	17	2
10	29	(United States) Logan Sargeant	Charouz Racing System	20	+5.461	8	1
11	21	(Italy) Lorenzo Colombo	Campos Racing	20	+5.979	11	
12	11	(Japan) Ayumu Iwasa	Hitech Grand Prix	20	+6.268	10	
13	24	(United Kingdom) Jake Hughes	Carlin Buzz Racing	20	+8.050	18	
14	9	(United States) Juan Manuel Correa	ART Grand Prix	20	+8.279	14	
15	10	(United States) Jak Crawford	Hitech Grand Prix	20	+8.417	22	
16	18	(Brazil) Caio Collet	MP Motorsport	20	+9.282	25	
17	26	(Australia) Calan Williams	Jenzer Motorsport	20	+10.052	16	
18	27	(United Kingdom) Johnathan Hoggard	Jenzer Motorsport	20	+16.140	23	
19	19	(Netherlands) Tijmen van der Helm	MP Motorsport	20	+18.753	20	
20	31	(France) Reshad de Gerus	Charouz Racing System	20	+27.090	27	
21	15	(Denmark) Oliver Rasmussen	HWA Racelab	20	+27.678	21	
22	28	(Romania) Filip Ugran	Jenzer Motorsport	20	+28.155	30	
23	12	(Czech Republic) Roman Staněk	Hitech Grand Prix	20	+29.002	15	
24	16	(Mexico) Rafael Villagómez	HWA Racelab	20	+28.435	28	
25	14	(Italy) Matteo Nannini	HWA Racelab	20	+53.284	13	
26	22	(Belgium) Amaury Cordeel	Campos Racing	20	+52.735	19	
27	17	(France) Victor Martins	MP Motorsport	20	+58.168	24	
DNF	23	(Israel) Ido Cohen	Carlin Buzz Racing	17	Collision	26	
DNF	20	(Hungary) László Tóth	Campos Racing	17	Collision	29	
DNF	25	(United Kingdom) Jonny Edgar	Carlin Buzz Racing	14	Mechanical	12	
Fastest lap set by (Italy) Matteo Nannini: 1:42.442 (lap 17)

== Standings after the event ==
Drivers' Championship standings

	Pos.	Driver	Points
	1	(Norway) Dennis Hauger	152
1	2	(Australia) Jack Doohan	89
1	3	(United Kingdom) Olli Caldwell	86
2	4	(Denmark) Frederik Vesti	80
1	5	(Russia) Aleksandr Smolyar	73

Teams' Championship standings

Pos.	Team	Points
1	(Italy) Prema Racing	282
2	(Italy) Trident	194
3	(France) ART Grand Prix	162
4	(Netherlands) MP Motorsport	107
5	(United Kingdom) Hitech Grand Prix	64

- Note: Only the top five positions are included for both sets of standings.

== See also ==
- 2021 Hungarian Grand Prix

Previous round: 2021 Spielberg Formula 3 round	FIA Formula 3 Championship; 2021 season	Next round: 2021 Spa-Francorchamps Formula 3 round
Previous round: 2020 Budapest Formula 3 round	Budapest Formula 3 round	Next round: 2022 Budapest Formula 3 round
