= Hervé Leclerc =

Monégasque racing driver (1963–2017)

- Leclerc c. 2009
- Born: Hervé Arthur Gabriel Leclerc; 7 March 1963; Monte Carlo, Monaco
- Died: 20 June 2017 (aged 54); Monte Carlo, Monaco
- Spouse: Pascale Tolotta (m. 1995)
- Children: Charles; Arthur
- Nationality: (Monaco) Monégasque

French Formula Three Championship career
- Years active: 1983–1988
- Teams: Ecole Avia La Chatre, Jacky Carmignon, Patrick Jamin, AA Sport
- Starts: 0
- Wins: 0
- Podiums: 0
- Poles: 0
- Fastest laps: 0
- Best finish: 8th in 1988

Hervé Arthur Gabriel Leclerc (French pronunciation: [ɛʁve ləklɛʁ]; 7 March 1963 – 20 June 2017) was a Monégasque racing driver who competed in French Formula Three from 1983 to 1988. He is the father of Formula One driver Charles Leclerc and sportscar racing driver Arthur.

== Career ==
Leclerc began his professional racing career in 1981. At the age of 18, he entered a racing contest in France and an impressive performance earned him the chance to compete in Formula 3.

For 1988, Leclerc remained in French Formula 3, this time with a seat at AA Sport. Leclerc drove a Reynard 883 powered by a Volkswagen engine. In the 1988 season, Leclerc only made one appearance at the Monaco Grand Prix, in which he finished eighth, the highest finish of his career. This race would become the last professional appearance of his career as Leclerc retired shortly afterwards due to a lack of funding.

== Post-racing Career ==
After retiring from motorsport, Leclerc began working for Mecaplast, a plastic injection molding company founded by his stepfather, Charles "Charly" Manni.

As his two sons Charles and Arthur grew older, Hervé began to manage their careers. He introduced Charles to karting at the age of four at the Brignoles track, owned by the father of Jules Bianchi. Leclerc accompanied his sons to both French and international karting circuits which eventually allowed them to progress into single seaters.

== Personal life ==
Hervé was married to Pascale Tolotta, a former hairdresser who operated a salon in the Fontvieille district of Monaco. He was the stepfather of Lorenzo Tolotta-Leclerc, Pascale's son from an earlier marriage. Hervé Leclerc has two biological sons—Charles Leclerc and Arthur Leclerc, who would go on to race in Formula One and FIA Formula 2 respectively.

== Death ==
Leclerc died from cancer on 20 June 2017 at the age of 54, just four days before his son Charles won the Formula Two feature race in Baku. Before his death, Charles informed him that he had secured a contract to compete in Formula One, which was at the time untrue. This was in order to ensure that Hervé died knowing his son had made it to Formula One, but in the end, it was a promise that became reality the very next year when Charles joined Sauber.
