= Arthur Leclerc =

Monegasque racing driver (born 2000)

- Leclerc in 2026
- Nationality: (Monaco) Monégasque
- Born: 14 October 2000 (age 26) Monte Carlo, Monaco
- Relatives: Hervé Leclerc (father); Charles Leclerc (brother); Lorenzo Leclerc (brother)

GT World Challenge Europe Endurance Cup career
- Debut season: 2025
- Current team: AF Corse - Francorchamps Motors
- Categorisation: FIA Silver (until 2021); FIA Gold (2022–)
- Car number: 50
- Starts: 4
- Wins: 0
- Podiums: 0
- Poles: 0
- Fastest laps: 0
- Best finish: 9th in 2025

Previous series
- 2025 2024 2024 2023 2022 2021–2022 2020 2020 2019 2018: GTWC Europe; Italian GT; ELMS; FIA Formula 2 FR Asian; FIA Formula 3 Alpine Elf Europa Cup; FR European; ADAC F4; French F4

Championship titles
- 2024 2022: Italian GT - GT3 Endurance; FR Asian

Arthur Leclerc (French pronunciation: [aʁtyʁ ləklɛʁ]; born 14 October 2000) is a Monégasque racing driver who last competed in the GT World Challenge Europe Endurance Cup for AF Corse. He is the younger brother of Scuderia Ferrari Formula One driver Charles Leclerc, and a former member of Ferrari Driver Academy.

Leclerc finished sixth in the 2022 FIA Formula 3 Championship with Prema Racing, before stepping up to the FIA Formula 2 Championship in 2023 with DAMS. He was the runner-up during the 2020 Formula Regional European Championship and the 2022 Formula Regional Asian champion. He is also the champion of the 2024 Italian GT Endurance Championship together with Giancarlo Fisichella and Tommaso Mosca.

Leclerc currently serves as the development driver for Scuderia Ferrari.

== Early racing career ==
=== Karting ===
Not much is known about Leclerc's karting career, although he won the Kart Racing Academy championship in 2014. At some point, Leclerc's karting career experienced a hiatus as the family decided to prioritise his brother, Charles, and Leclerc had to stop karting for some years. This was because there was not enough budget for both children.

=== French F4 ===
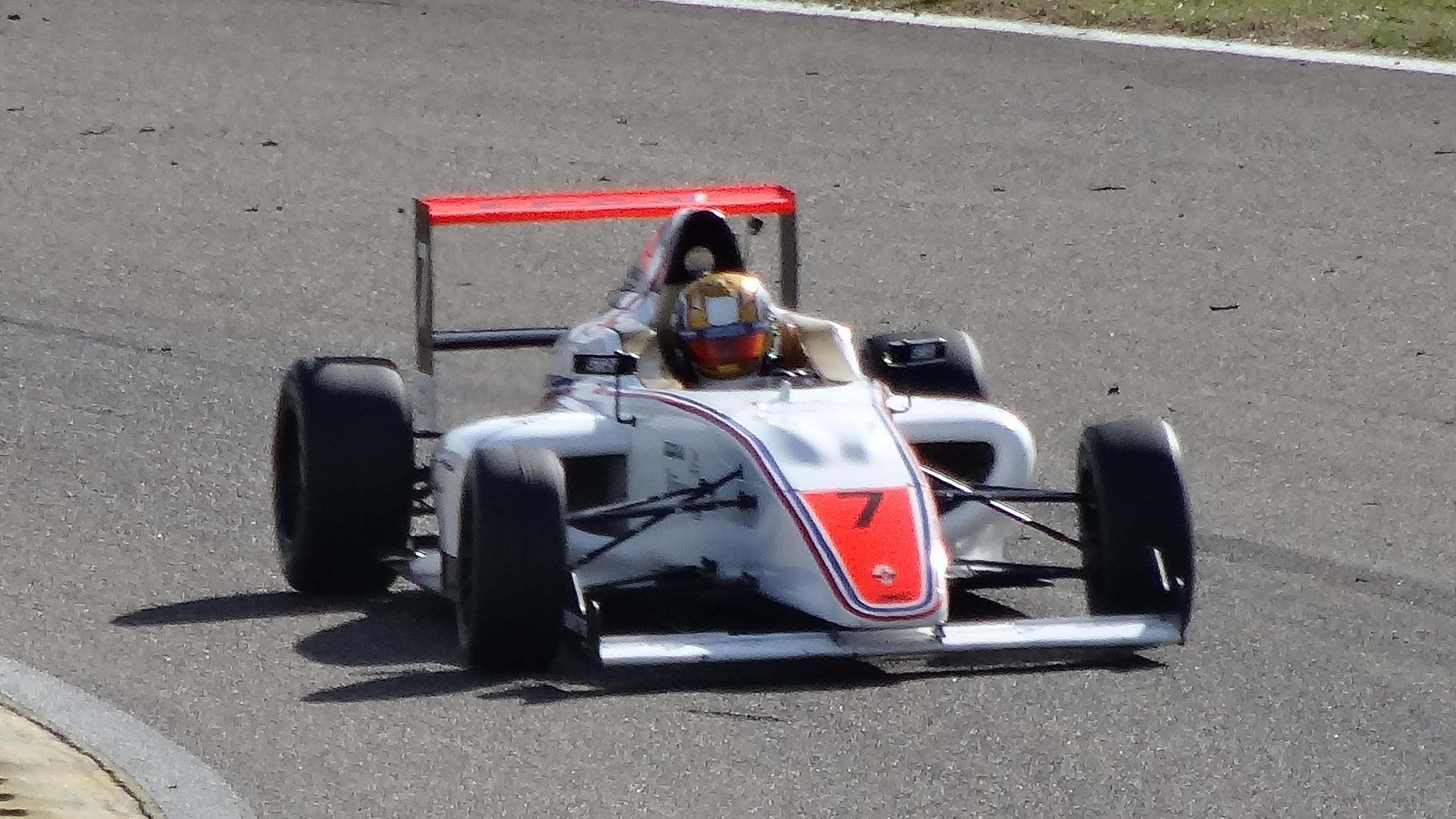
Leclerc racing in the 2018 French F4 Championship

In 2018, Leclerc raced in the French F4 Championship. He finished fifth in the championship with two race wins. He started his racing career at the relative late age of seventeen, as his family focused on getting his brother Charles to Formula One. Leclerc was immediately on form, as he claimed his first single-seater win in just his second race. However, the championship was dominated by eventual champion Caio Collet and he only took one more win at Magny-Cours. Nevertheless, Leclerc claimed an additional six podiums, ending fifth in the championship.

=== ADAC Formula 4 ===
Leclerc competed in the ADAC Formula 4 Championship in 2019 for US Racing-CHRS outfit. During the second race, a mistake on the final lap saw Leclerc lose a chance at his maiden win, instead finishing third. His first win would come at the Hockenheimring, where he took a lights-to-flag victory from pole. Throughout the season, he was an outsider for the championship, and he eventually ended the standings third overall with one race win and eight podiums.

=== Formula Regional European Championship ===
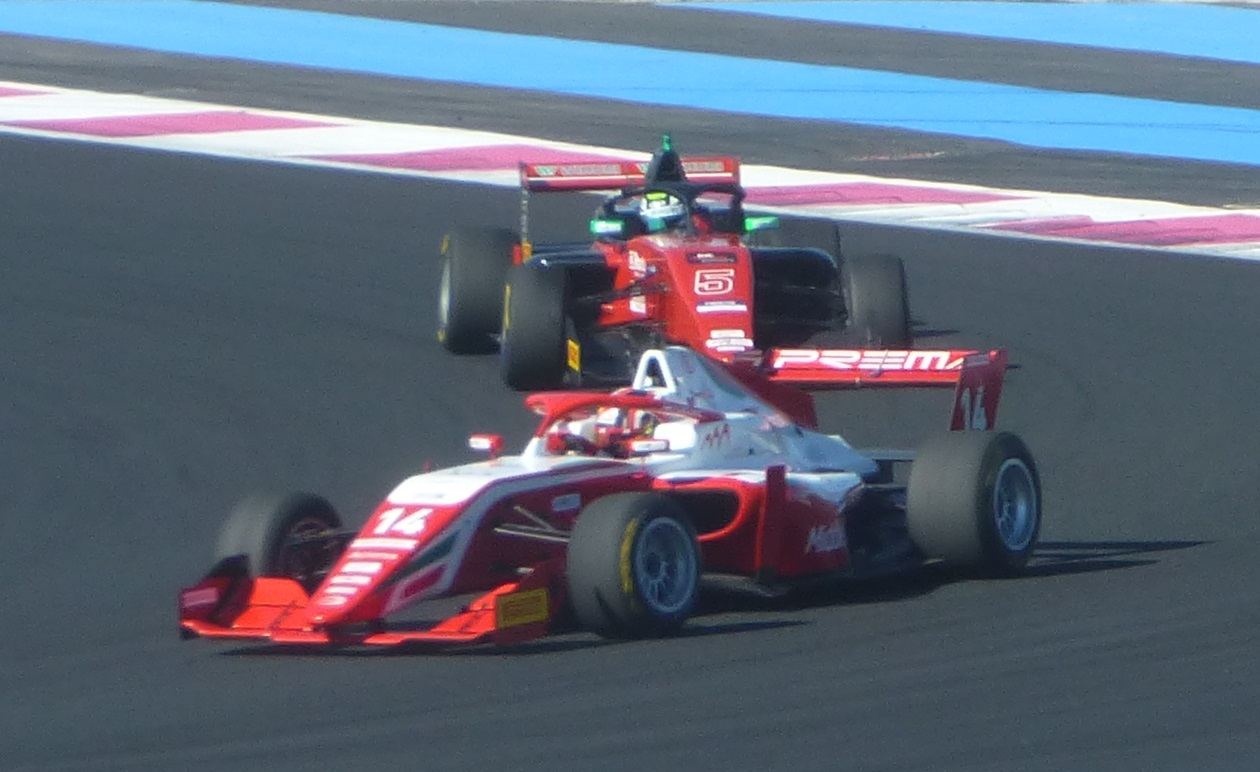
Leclerc racing in the 2020 Formula Regional European Championship

In 2020, Leclerc joined the Formula Regional European Championship for Prema Powerteam alongside Oliver Rasmussen, Gianluca Petecof and 2019 W Series champion Jamie Chadwick, in his first year as a Ferrari junior. He started the season with a pole position hat-trick at the Misano round, taking victory in the second race. Leclerc won again in the first and third races at Paul Ricard, and he took the lead of the championship in Mugello by winning all three races of the round. However, he would lose the lead to teammate Petecof by finishing third, ninth and sixth at the Monza Circuit. Subsequently, both Leclerc and Petecof failed to win any races throughout the remainder of the season. In the final round at Vallelunga, the Monegasque driver scored eight points in the first race with a sixth place, but he lost the championship to Petecof after he spun in the final race under wet conditions. On his mental mistake that costed him the title, Leclerc felt "disappointed" and had "no words". Leclerc ended the season in second with 343 points and six victories.

=== FIA Formula 3 Championship ===
==== 2021 ====
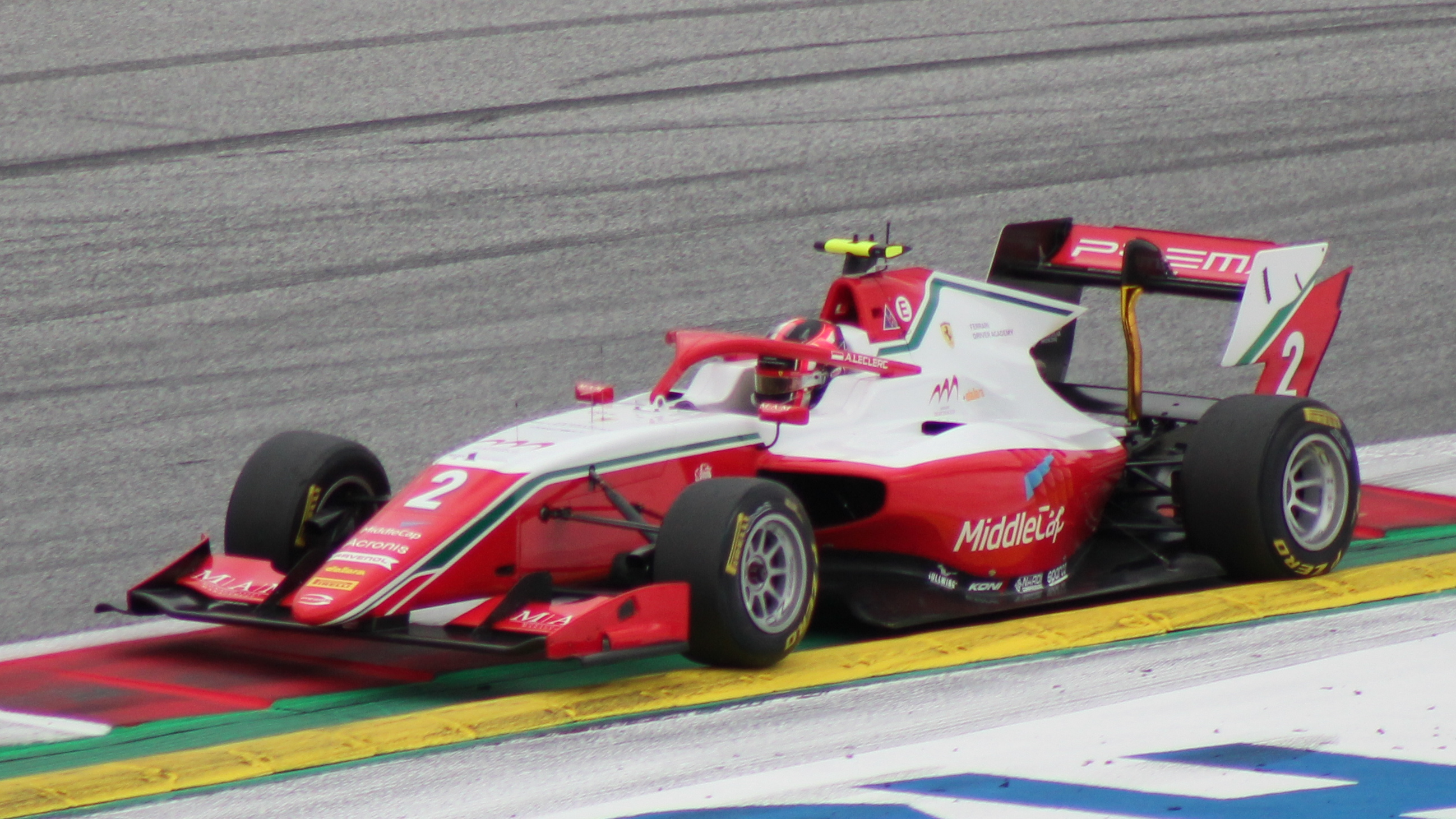
Leclerc driving the Dallara F3 2019 during the 2021 Spielberg Formula 3 round

Leclerc tested for Prema during the 2020 post-season testing. In 2021, Leclerc was partnered with Olli Caldwell and Red Bull academy member Dennis Hauger at Prema Racing in the FIA Formula 3 Championship. He also competed in the 2021 Virtual Grand Prix Championship for Ferrari, his brother's real-world team. Leclerc had a challenging debut in Barcelona, where he failed to score any points, due to his poor qualifying and a puncture in the first race. Leclerc's Paul Ricard weekend got off to a bad start, unable to start a lap in qualifying due to a suspension failure. He charged all the way to 12th in Race 1 for reverse pole in Race 2. Leclerc would then take his first victory in Race 2, as well as his first points, before once again coming close to the top ten on Sunday. He would qualify ninth for the Red Bull Ring round, but retired in the first race due to a puncture on lap 10. During the second race, Leclerc amazingly climbed 21 places to end in sixth place, in which he was "really happy". Disappointment would follow in Race 3, as Leclerc lost control while overtaking Victor Martins and slammed into Clément Novalak, bringing an early end to his and Leclerc's race. He was taken to hospital but was discharged later that Sunday, also receiving a three-place grid penalty for the next race due to that incident.

Leclerc scored his maiden pole position at the Hungaroring. The first two races would come without points and during Race 3, Leclerc maintained his lead until lap 9, where he battled with teammate Hauger and lost out but still finished in second place. Leclerc had an unremarkable round at Spa-Francorchamps, taking two tenth places from Race 2 and Race 3 due to qualifying in 13th. In Zandvoort, Leclerc qualified tenth. He then scored his second win of the season during Race 1, having stormed from third to first at the start and also defending hard from Logan Sargeant. He followed it up with seventh and tenth places in Race 2 and Race 3 respectively. In the Sochi, Leclerc qualified a disappointing 14th, but managed to end with a pair of seventh places. Leclerc ended up tenth in the standings, with one pole, two wins and 79 points, behind Caldwell and title-winning teammate Hauger, but could not prevent Prema from defending the teams' title. He remained with Prema for post-season testing.

==== 2022 ====
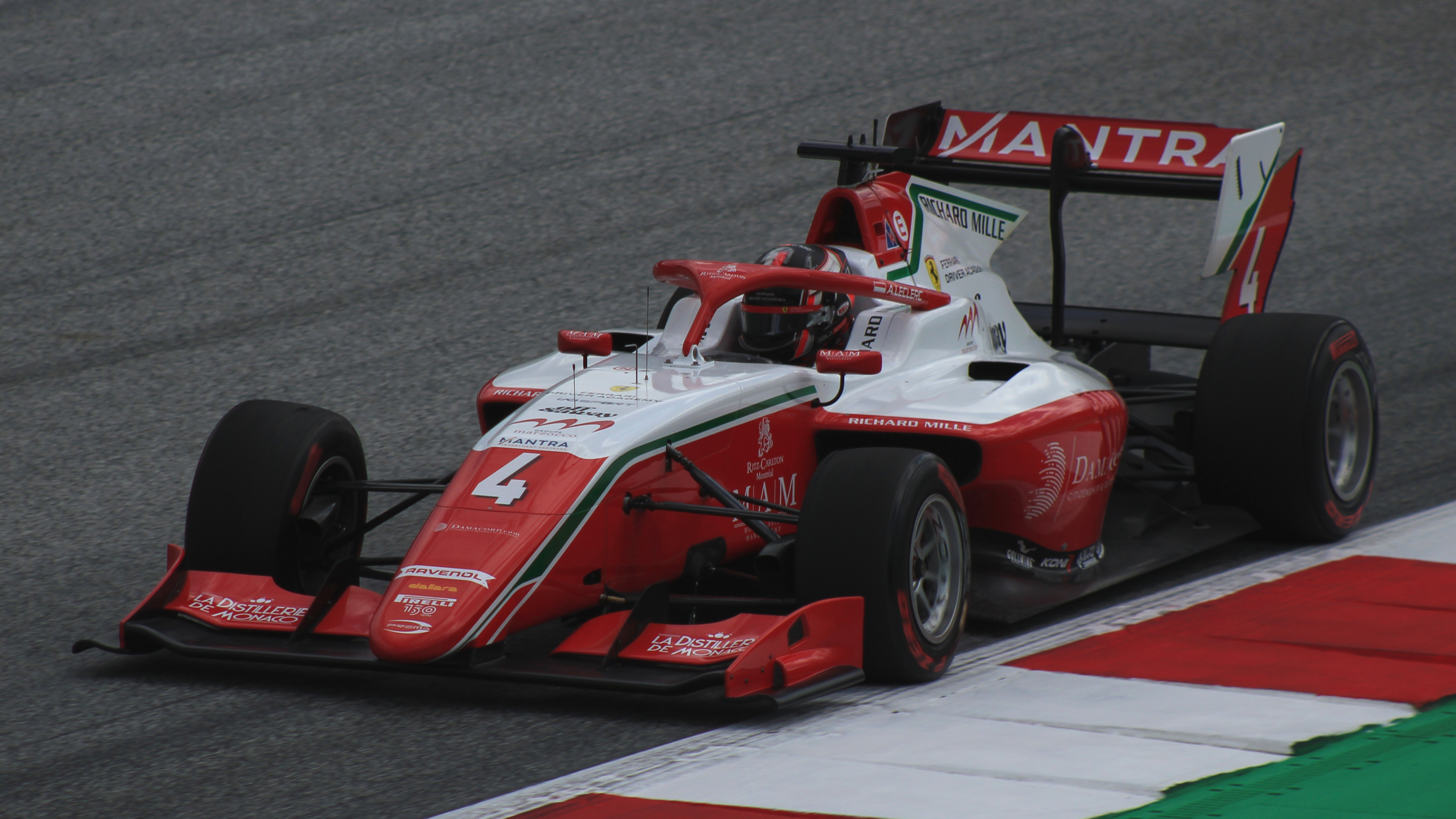
Leclerc driving for Prema Racing during the 2022 Spielberg Formula 3 round

During pre-season, prior to his main campaign, he took part in the Formula Regional Asian Championship with Mumbai Falcons. He won his first race of the championship during the second round, taking the lead of the standings. Leclerc ended the third round with a hat-trick of podiums, including winning the final race. Two more wins followed, where in his later one, he claimed his first single-seater title with two races to spare.

Leclerc was retained by Prema Racing for the 2022 season, partnering fellow Ferrari Driver Academy member Oliver Bearman and Red Bull academy's Jak Crawford. After re-signing with Prema, Leclerc stated that he wanted to be "more consistent" in his sophomore season of Formula 3. His qualifying didn't go to plan in Bahrain, where he only qualified 14th. Leclerc had a successful sprint race, climbing to fifth and nearly pipping fourth place off Zane Maloney. He made another charge in the feature race, finishing second place for his first podium finish of the year. In Imola, things did not start well as he was spun out in qualifying by Enzo Trulli, eventually the Monégasque wounded up 21st. He had a difficult sprint race, but another recovery drive saw Leclerc claim fourth place at the end. Leclerc would start fifth for the Barcelona round, and would finish one place higher in the sprint race. Leclerc's feature race was messy, as a collision with David Vidales and erratic driving on Juan Manuel Correa saw him receive two five-second time penalties, and was ended 16th.

In Silverstone, Leclerc qualified second. Eighth place came in the sprint race having to overtake both of his Prema teammates, before his first and only win of the year came on Sunday. Leclerc would overtake polesitter Zak O'Sullivan in the early stages of the race for victory. Leclerc took victory in the main race at Silverstone, having overtaken Zak O'Sullivan in the early stages of the race. At the Red Bull Ring, he topped practice for the first time and qualified fourth. He would score decent points in the races, finishing taking a pair of fourth-place finishes in the sprint and feature races respectively. Leclerc again qualified fourth in Budapest, however a disappointing sprint race would come. Battling for fourth place on the very last lap with teammate Crawford, he crashed into the back of the American, both losing places and points to their rivals. He would carry a five-place grid penalty for the feature race, and after making early progress to sixth place, he fell to eighth as O'Sullivan and Correa passed him on slick tyres at a dry track.

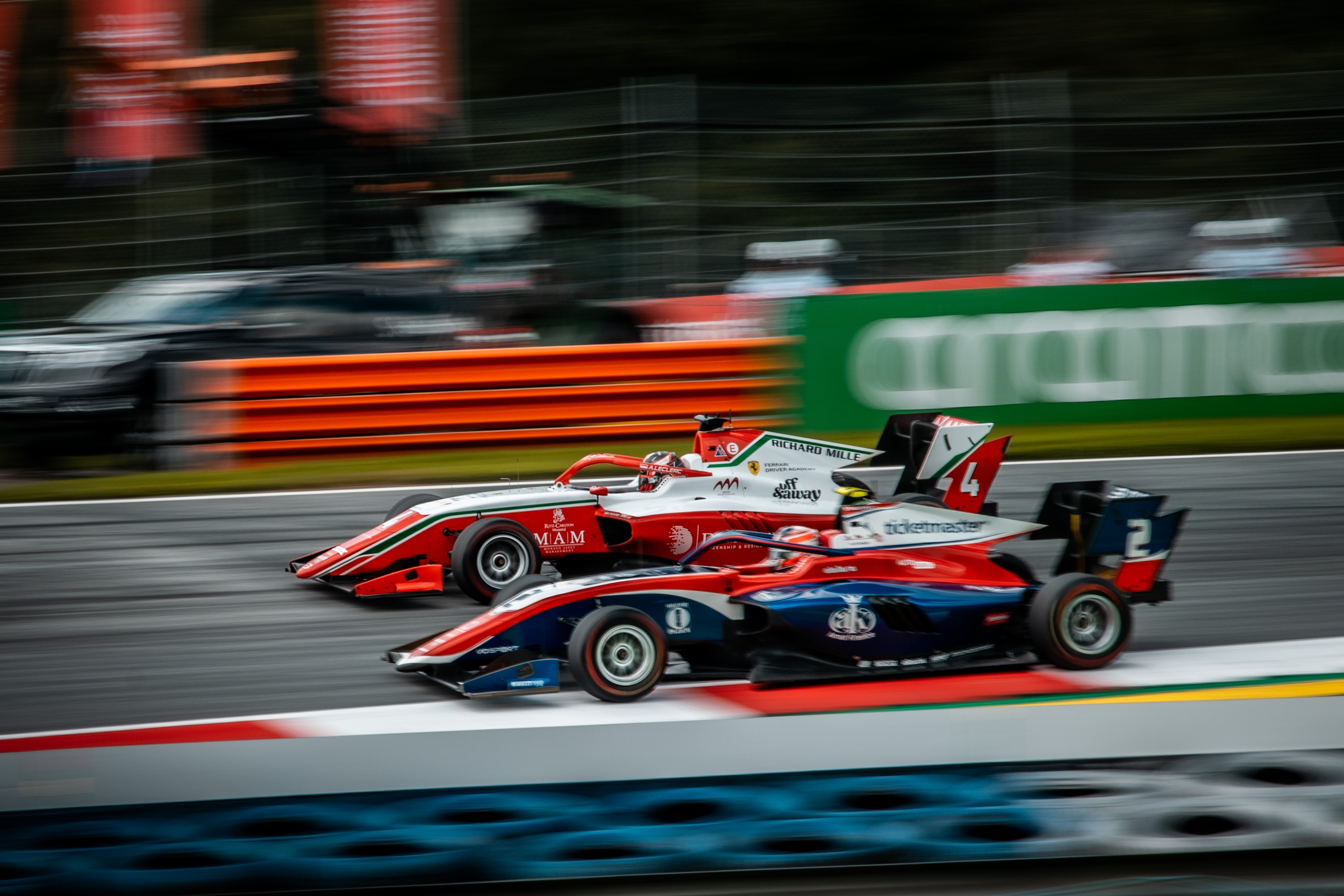
Leclerc battling Roman Staněk during the 2022 season at the Red Bull Ring

Following the summer break, an energy confusion saw Leclerc down in 20th for Spa-Francorchamps qualifying, but made an electric charge, picking up fifteen places for fifth at the flag. He would finish just outside the points in 11th during the feature race. A weekend to forget in Zandvoort saw Leclerc be rewarded without points, and left him an outsider for the title. He qualified fifth during the Monza finale, ahead of both teammates and championship contenders. In the sprint race, he dropped a few places after making contact with Victor Martins, but drove well to finish eighth. In the feature race, he finished in fifth place despite contact with a rival. Leclerc ended the championship in a disappointing sixth place, with one win and one more podium, also claiming 114 points in a season that could have been much better.

=== FIA Formula 2 Championship ===
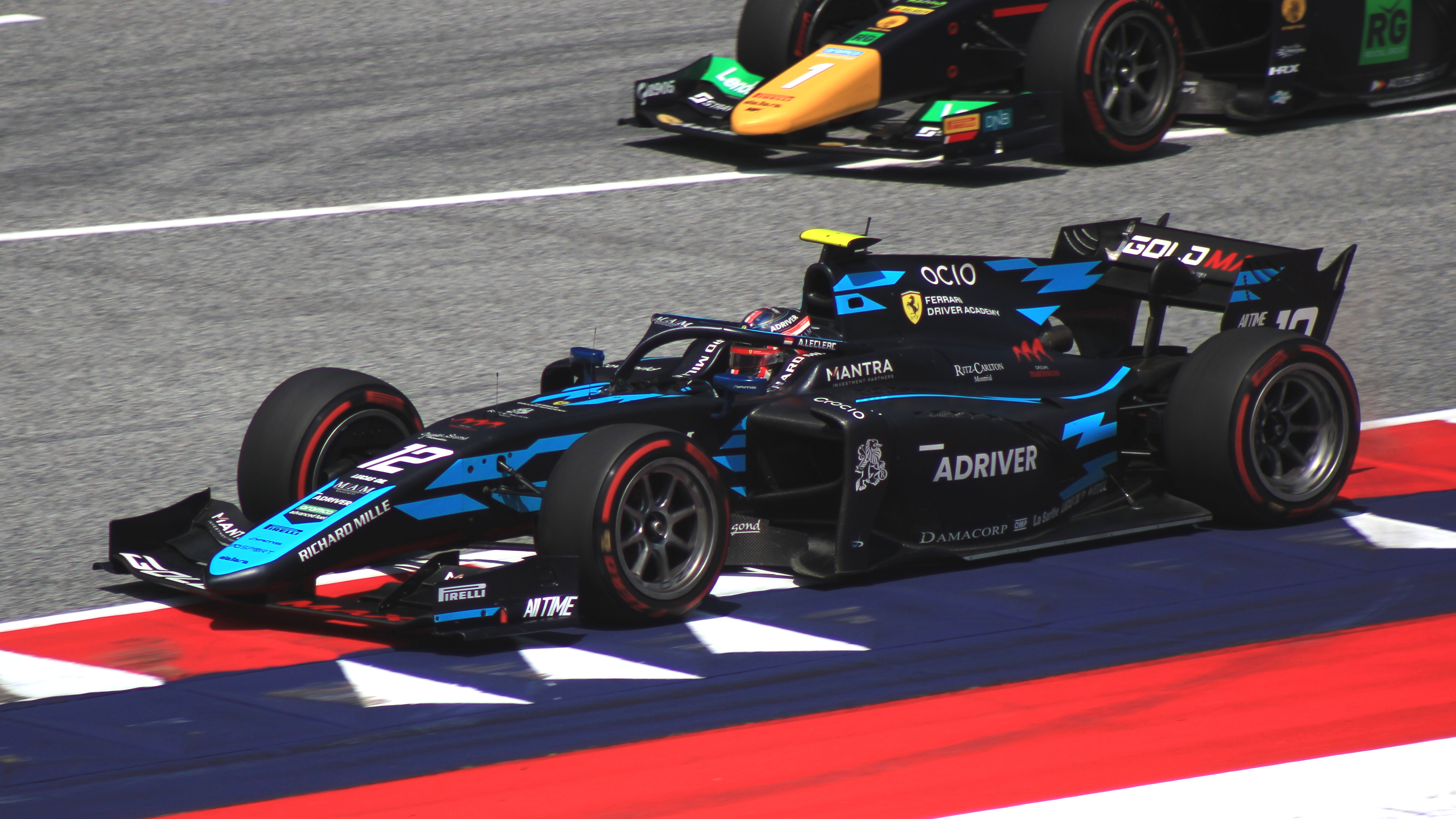
Leclerc driving the Dallara F2 2018 during the 2023 Spielberg Formula 2 round

After the F2 Yas Marina season finale, Leclerc was announced to be stepping up to Formula 2 with DAMS for the 2023 season, where he would partner with Ayumu Iwasa. Leclerc qualified eighth for the Bahrain season opener but his strong sprint race was cut short by a ten-second stop/go penalty for a starting grid infringement. He had an eventful feature race, being one of the first to pit and concede track position in the top-five. He would go on to make a few mistakes and eventually wounded up sixth. In Jeddah, he qualified 13th and failed to score points in the sprint race, but made the alternate strategy work in the feature race. He ended in eighth place, and a better result was inevitable had a slow pit stop not happen. Leclerc qualified seventh in Melbourne, and pressured Kush Maini in the sprint race but was unable to take the podium position, finishing fourth. He would go one better in the feature race, achieving his maiden podium after Victor Martins and Dennis Hauger collided during the late stages of the race.

Baku was relatively disappointing for Leclerc, qualifying down in 13th and he was involved in a late safety car restart, misjudging his braking point on cold tyres and nearly slamming into the wall. Leclerc ended the feature race in 11th, but was promoted to tenth after Victor Martins was disqualified, continuing his feature race point-scoring streak. In Monaco, Leclerc crashed on his lap during qualifying, which left him down in 20th. Similar to his brother Charles' woes in his races at Monaco, he would have a weekend to forget, finishing 14th in the sprint and retiring from the feature race with a brake issue. In Barcelona, Leclerc qualified in 13th. Having ended the sprint race in ninth, he went on the alternate strategy in the feature race and it paid off in the same position, this time scoring points.

Leclerc's form faded starting from Austria, and despite qualifying eighth, as during the sprint race he started on the wrong tyres on a drying track, and a loose wheel curtailed his feature race. In Silverstone, Leclerc qualified 11th. Having scored a point in the sprint race, he went on the alternate strategy in the feature race, which partially worked out as he made his way to third with eight laps remaining. However, he was forced to pit early due to a safety car mid-race, which led to him dropping to ninth place. More tough weekends followed, failing to score points in both Budapest and Spa-Francorchamps due to unfortunate incidents.

In Monza, Leclerc had another round of mixed fortunes, climbing from 12th to seventh in the sprint race to score points in three rounds. However, he spun out of the feature race on just lap 6. At the Yas Marina season finale, a successful alternate strategy for Leclerc saw him climb to sixth at the chequered flag, although an early five-second penalty for leaving the track and gaining an advantage prevented him from a higher result. Leclerc finished the season a lowly 15th in the standings with 49 points and one podium, paling in comparison to teammate Iwasa's 165.

== Formula One ==
In 2019, Leclerc was signed to the Sauber Junior Team as part of his move to the ADAC Formula 4 Championship. The following year, he was made a member of the Ferrari Driver Academy. At the end of December 2023, Leclerc was announced to be leaving the Ferrari Driver Academy, although he is said to be "remaining part of the Ferrari family". Not long after, he was announced to be the development driver for Ferrari in 2024. He drove a Formula One car for the first time at Circuit de Barcelona-Catalunya, driving the Ferrari F1-75. He again drove the F1-75 at the Fiorano Circuit a week later. In May, Leclerc drove the F1-75 once again in the F1-75 at Fiorano trialing spray guards.

Leclerc made his free practice debut in place of Carlos Sainz Jr. during the 2024 Abu Dhabi Grand Prix. Alongside his brother Charles, the two became the first sibling pairing to both drive for the same Formula One team in the same official F1 session. Leclerc finished the session in 18th place. He also drove the SF-24 again during the young drivers' test for the afternoon session, completing 68 laps and ending the session in 14th.

Leclerc returned to the wheel during the 2025 Abu Dhabi Grand Prix, placing sixteenth in the timesheets.

=== Formula E ===
Leclerc was a development driver in FIA Formula E championship during the 2017–18 Formula E season for Venturi Racing. By doing so, he was given access to Venturi's simulators and personal development systems. Leclerc was retained for the 2018–19 Formula E season. Leclerc did his first public test for Venturi at the 2019 Formula E Rookie Test at the Marrakech Street Circuit. For the 2019–20 Formula E season Venturi announced Leclerc as their test driver for the season. Leclerc's involvement in Formula E ended after the season.

However, Leclerc returned to the wheel of a Formula E car in July 2025, driving for Maserati MSG Racing during the Berlin rookie test at the Tempelhof Airport Street Circuit.

== Endurance racing career ==
=== 2024 ===
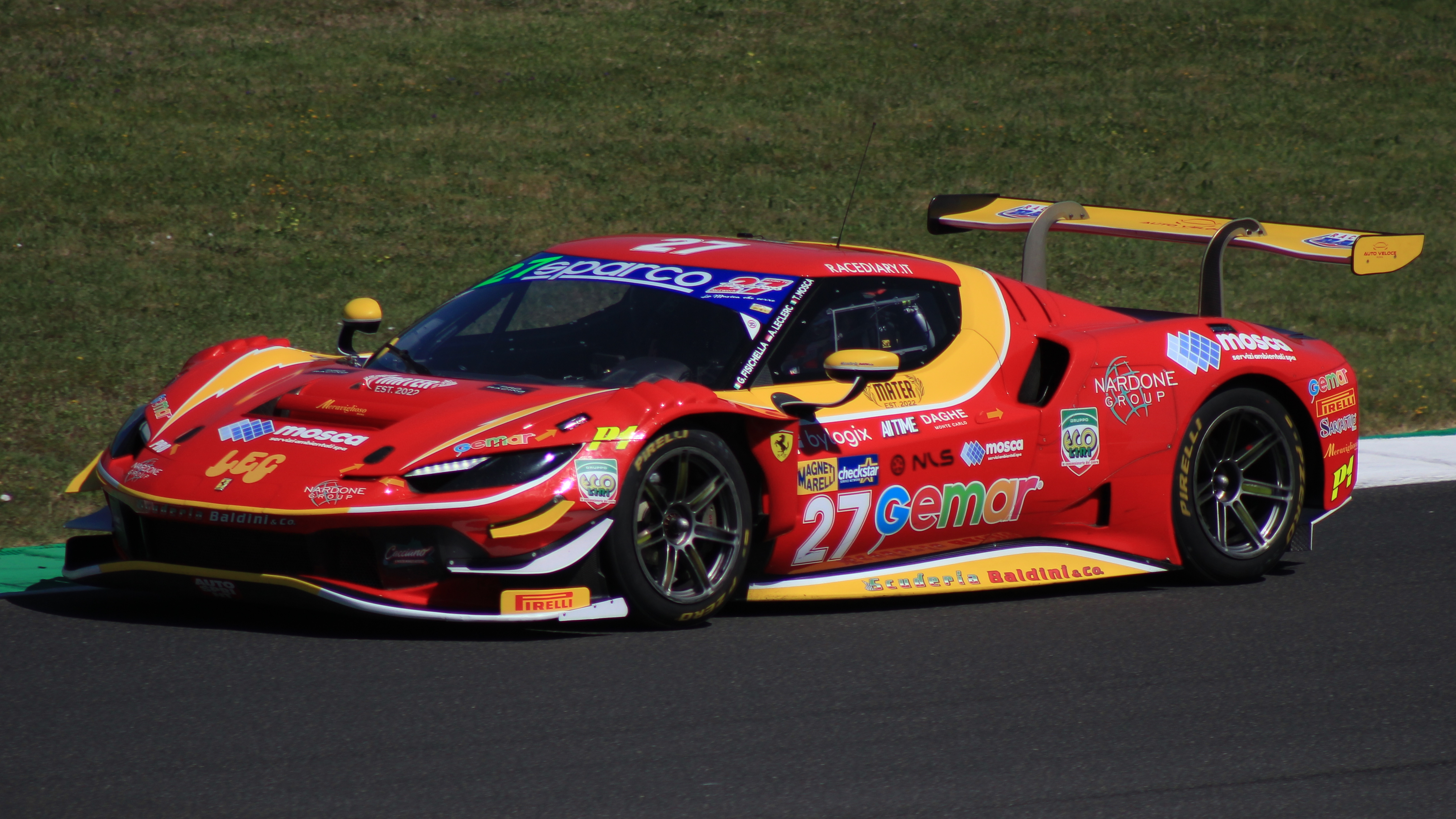
Leclerc racing at Mugello in the 2024 Italian GT Championship.

In 2024, Leclerc joined the European Le Mans Series with Panis Racing, alongside Manuel Maldonado and Charles Milesi. Leclerc and the #65 car achieved their first and only win of the year at the 4 Hours of Imola, having controlled proceedings from pole position. Being in the championship fight all the way to the final round for the 4 Hours of Portimão, the No. 65 took pole but eventually slipped to 12th place at the end of the race. The trio finished fourth in the standings, with 61 points.

Leclerc also competed in the Italian GT Championship in the GT3 category. At the end of the year, Leclerc tested the Ferrari 499P Hypercar in the Rookie Test at the Bahrain International Circuit.

=== 2025 ===
At the start of 2025, Leclerc made his 24 Hours of Daytona debut, driving for AF Corse alongside Riccardo Agostini, Conrad Laursen and Custodio Toledo in the GTD category. The team finished the race in eighth place of the category.

For his main campaign, Leclerc raced in the GT World Challenge Europe Endurance Cup with AF Corse alongside Eliseo Donno and Antonio Fuoco. At the 24 Hours of Spa, racing in a field as "the strongest field I've ever raced in", Leclerc and his teammates finished fourth. The trio scored the same result at the final round in Barcelona thanks to a late-stint charge by Fuoco. These two points finishes yielded a ninth place in the drivers' standings.

=== 2026 ===
Leclerc continued in the GT World Challenge Europe Endurance Cup with AF Corse in 2026.

== Personal life ==
Leclerc has two older brothers, Lorenzo and Charles, the latter of whom currently races in Formula One for Ferrari.

== Karting record ==
=== Karting career summary ===
Season	Series	Position
2008	Coupe de France — Mini Kart	44th
2014	National Series Karting — KRA 11-15	1st
2015	Championnat Regional PACAC — Nationale	2nd
2015	National Series Karting — Nationale	NC

== Racing record ==
=== Racing career summary ===
Season	Series	Team	Races	Wins	Poles	F/Laps	Podiums	Points	Position
2017–18	Formula E	Venturi Formula E Team	Development driver						
2018	French F4 Championship	FFSA Academy	20	2	1	1	8	199	5th
2018–19	Formula E	Venturi Formula E Team	Development driver						
2019	ADAC Formula 4 Championship	US Racing-CHRS	20	1	1	2	8	202	**3rd**
2019–20	Formula E	ROKiT Venturi Racing	Test/reserve driver						
2020	Formula Regional European Championship	Prema Powerteam	23	6	7	2	15	343	**2nd**
2020	Alpine Elf Europa Cup	Racing Technology	1	0	0	0	0	0	NC†
2021	FIA Formula 3 Championship	Prema Racing	20	2	1	2	3	79	10th
2022	Formula Regional Asian Championship	Mumbai Falcons India Racing	15	4	1	1	9	218	**1st**
2022	FIA Formula 3 Championship	Prema Racing	18	1	0	1	2	114	6th
2023	FIA Formula 2 Championship	DAMS	26	0	0	1	1	49	15th
2024	European Le Mans Series - LMP2	Panis Racing by TDS	6	1	0	1	1	61	4th
2024	Italian GT Endurance Championship - GT3	Scuderia Baldini	4	2	2	0	2	79	**1st**
2024	Formula One	Scuderia Ferrari	Development driver						
2025	GT World Challenge Europe Sprint Cup	AF Corse - Francorchamps Motors	10	0	0	0	0	17	12th
2025	GT World Challenge Europe Endurance Cup	AF Corse - Francorchamps Motors	4	0	0	0	0	34	9th
2025	IMSA SportsCar Championship - GTD	AF Corse	1	0	0	0	0	251	68th
2025	Formula One	Scuderia Ferrari HP	Development driver						
2026	GT World Challenge Europe Endurance Cup	AF Corse	5	0	0	0	0	11	23rd
2026	GT World Challenge Europe Sprint Cup	AF Corse	10	1	0	0	3	65.5	**2nd**
2026	Formula One	Scuderia Ferrari HP	Development driver						

^{†} As Leclerc was a guest driver, he was ineligible to score points.
* Season still in progress.

=== Complete French F4 Championship results ===
(key) (Races in bold indicate pole position) (Races in italics indicate fastest lap)

Year	1	2	3	4	5	6	7	8	9	10	11	12	13	14	15	16	17	18	19	20	21	Pos	Points
2018	NOG; 1; 6	NOG; 2; 1	NOG; 3; 4	PAU; 1; 2	PAU; 2; 7	PAU; 3; 11	**SPA**; **1**; 3	SPA; 2; 5	SPA; 3; 4	DIJ; 1; 6	DIJ; 2; 2	DIJ; 3; 6	MAG; 1; 3	MAG; 2; 1	MAG; 3; 2	JER; 1; 2	JER; 2; 6	JER; 3; 7	LEC; 1; 15	LEC; 2; 9	LEC; 3; 10	5th	199

=== Complete ADAC Formula 4 Championship results ===
(key) (Races in bold indicate pole position) (Races in italics indicate fastest lap)

Year	Team	1	2	3	4	5	6	7	8	9	10	11	12	13	14	15	16	17	18	19	20	Pos	Points
2019	US Racing-CHRS	OSC; 1; 12	OSC; 2; 3	OSC; 3; 4	RBR; 1; 6	RBR; 2; 3	RBR; 3; 4	HOC; 1; 10	**HOC**; **2**; 1	ZAN; 1; 2	ZAN; 2 Ret	ZAN; 3 Ret	NÜR; 1; 10	NÜR; 2; 3	NÜR; 3; 5	HOC; 1; 2	HOC; 2; 3	HOC; 3 Ret	SAC; 1; 6	SAC; 2; 5	SAC; 3; 3	3rd	202

=== Complete Formula Regional European Championship results ===
(key) (Races in bold indicate pole position) (Races in italics indicate fastest lap)

Year	Team	1	2	3	4	5	6	7	8	9	10	11	12	13	14	15	16	17	18	19	20	21	22	23	24	Pos	Points
2020	Prema Powerteam	**MIS**; **1** Ret	**MIS**; **2**; 1	**MIS**; **3**; 2	**LEC**; **1**; 1	LEC; 2; 2	LEC; 3; 1	RBR; 1; 2	RBR; 2; 3	RBR; 3; 2	MUG; 1; 1	**MUG**; **2**; 1	**MUG**; **3**; 1	MNZ; 1; 3	MNZ; 2; 9†	**MNZ**; **3**; 6	CAT; 1; 2	CAT; 2; 5	CAT; 3; 4	IMO; 1; 3	IMO; 2 Ret	IMO; 3; 2	VLL; 1; 6	VLL; 2 C	VLL; 3 Ret	2nd	343

^{†} Driver did not finish the race, but was classified as they completed more than 90% of the race distance.

=== Complete Alpine Elf Europa Cup results ===
(key) (Races in bold indicate pole position; races in italics indicate points for the fastest lap of top ten finishers)

Year	Entrant	1	2	3	4	5	6	7	8	9	10	DC	Points
2020	Racing Technology	NOG; 1	NOG; 2	NOG; 3	MAG; 1 Ret	MAG; 2 DNS	LEC; 1	LEC; 2	LEC; 3	PRT; 1	PRT; 2	NC†	0

^{†} As Leclerc was a guest driver, he was ineligible for points.

=== Complete FIA Formula 3 Championship results ===
(key) (Races in bold indicate pole position; races in italics indicate points for the fastest lap of top ten finishers)

Year	Entrant	1	2	3	4	5	6	7	8	9	10	11	12	13	14	15	16	17	18	19	20	21	DC	Points
2021	Prema Racing	CAT; 1; 28	CAT; 2; 24	CAT; 3; 13	LEC; 1; 12	LEC; 2; 1	LEC; 3; 13	RBR; 1 Ret	RBR; 2; 6	RBR; 3 Ret	HUN; 1; 13	HUN; 2; 11	**HUN**; **3**; 2	SPA; 1; 13	SPA; 2; 10	SPA; 3; 10	ZAN; 1; 1	ZAN; 2; 7	ZAN; 3; 9	SOC; 1; 7	SOC; 2 C	SOC; 3; 7	10th	79
2022	Prema Racing	BHR; SPR; 5	BHR; FEA; 2	IMO; SPR; 13	IMO; FEA; 4	CAT; SPR; 4	CAT; FEA; 16	SIL; SPR; 8	SIL; FEA; 1	RBR; SPR; 4	RBR; FEA; 4	HUN; SPR; 27	HUN; FEA; 8	SPA; SPR; 5	SPA; FEA; 11	ZAN; SPR; 12	ZAN; FEA; 12	MNZ; SPR; 8	MNZ; FEA; 5				6th	114

=== Complete Formula Regional Asian Championship results ===
(key) (Races in bold indicate pole position) (Races in italics indicate the fastest lap of top ten finishers)

Year	Entrant	1	2	3	4	5	6	7	8	9	10	11	12	13	14	15	DC	Points
2022	Mumbai Falcons India Racing	ABU; 1; 3	ABU; 2; 3	ABU; 3; 5	DUB; 1; 9	DUB; 2; 1	DUB; 3; 7	DUB; 1; 2	DUB; 2; 3	DUB; 3; 1	DUB; 1; 4	DUB; 2; 5	DUB; 3; 1	**ABU**; **1**; 1	ABU; 2; 3	ABU; 3; 12	1st	218

=== Complete FIA Formula 2 Championship results ===
(key) (Races in bold indicate pole position) (Races in italics indicate points for the fastest lap of top ten finishers)

Year	Entrant	1	2	3	4	5	6	7	8	9	10	11	12	13	14	15	16	17	18	19	20	21	22	23	24	25	26	DC	Points
2023	DAMS	BHR; SPR; 12	BHR; FEA; 6	JED; SPR; 11	JED; FEA; 8	MEL; SPR; 4	MEL; FEA; 3	BAK; SPR; 16†	BAK; FEA; 10	MCO; SPR; 14	MCO; FEA; Ret	CAT; SPR; 9	CAT; FEA; 9	RBR; SPR; 13	RBR; FEA; Ret	SIL; SPR; 8	SIL; FEA; 9	HUN; SPR; 15	HUN; FEA; 13	SPA; SPR; 9	SPA; FEA; 11	ZAN; SPR; 11	ZAN; FEA; 14	MNZ; SPR; 7	MNZ; FEA; Ret	YMC; SPR; 21	YMC; FEA; 6	15th	49

=== Complete European Le Mans Series results ===
Year	Entrant	Class	Chassis	Engine	1	2	3	4	5	6	Rank	Points
2024	Panis VDS Racing	LMP2	Oreca 07	Gibson GK428 4.2 L V8	CAT; 5	LEC; 8	**IMO**; 1	SPA; 6	MUG; 4	**ALG**; 12	4th	61

=== Complete Formula One participations ===
(key) (Races in bold indicate pole position) (Races in italics indicate fastest lap)

Year	Entrant	Chassis	Engine	1	2	3	4	5	6	7	8	9	10	11	12	13	14	15	16	17	18	19	20	21	22	23	24	WDC	Points
2024	Scuderia Ferrari	Ferrari SF-24	Ferrari 066/12 1.6 V6 t	BHR	SAU	AUS	JPN	CHN	MIA	EMI	MON	CAN	ESP	AUT	GBR	HUN	BEL	NED	ITA	AZE	SIN	USA	MXC	SAP	LVG	QAT	ABU; TD	–	–
2025	Scuderia Ferrari HP	Ferrari SF-25	Ferrari 066/12 1.6 V6 t	AUS	CHN	JPN	BHR	SAU	MIA	EMI	MON	ESP	CAN	AUT	GBR	BEL	HUN	NED	ITA	AZE	SIN	USA	MXC	SAP	LVG	QAT	ABU; TD	–	–

=== Complete IMSA SportsCar Championship results ===
(key) (Races in bold indicate pole position; races in italics indicate fastest lap)

Year	Entrant	Class	Chassis	Engine	1	2	3	4	5	6	7	8	9	10	Rank	Points
2025	AF Corse	GTD	Ferrari 296 GT3	Ferrari F163CE 3.0 L Turbo V6	DAY; 7	SEB	LBH	LGA	WGL	MOS	ELK	VIR	IMS	PET	68th	251

=== Complete GT World Challenge Europe results ===
==== GT World Challenge Europe Endurance Cup ====
(Races in bold indicate pole position) (Races in italics indicate fastest lap)

Year	Team	Car	Class	1	2	3	4	5	6	7	Pos.	Points
2025	AF Corse - Francorchamps Motors	Ferrari 296 GT3	Pro	LEC; 16	MNZ; 43†	SPA; 6H; 5	SPA; 12H; 5	SPA; 24H; 4	NÜR; DNS	CAT; 4	9th	34
2026	AF Corse	Ferrari 296 GT3 Evo	Pro	LEC; 19	MNZ; 11	SPA; 6H; 22	SPA; 12H; 12	SPA; 24H; 5	NÜR; 40	ALG; 10	23rd	11

==== GT World Challenge Europe Sprint Cup ====
Year	Team	Car	Class	1	2	3	4	5	6	7	8	9	10	Pos.	Points
2025	AF Corse - Francorchamps Motors	Ferrari 296 GT3	Pro	BRH; 1; 5	BRH; 2; 4	ZAN; 1; 9	ZAN; 2 Ret	MIS; 1 Ret	MIS; 2; 24	MAG; 1; 12	MAG; 2; 10	VAL; 1; 8	VAL; 2; 19	12th	17
2026	AF Corse	Ferrari 296 GT3 Evo	Pro	BRH; 1; 1	BRH; 2; 15	MIS; 1; 9	MIS; 2; 6	MAG; 1; 2	MAG; 2; 4	ZAN; 1; 6	ZAN; 2; 5	CAT; 1 Ret	CAT; 2; 2	2nd	65.5

Sporting positions
Preceded by Guanyu Zhou	FR Asian Championship; Champion; 2022	Succeeded by Incumbent
