= 2021 Le Castellet Formula 3 round =

(France) 2021 Le Castellet Formula 3 round
Round details
- Round 2 of 7 in the 2021 FIA Formula 3 Championship.
- Location: Circuit Paul Ricard; Le Castellet, France
- Course: Permanent racing facility 5.842 km (3.630 mi)

Sprint race 1
- Date: 19 June 2021
- Laps: 20
Podium
First	(Russia) Aleksandr Smolyar	ART Grand Prix
Second	(France) Victor Martins	MP Motorsport
Third	(Australia) Calan Williams	Jenzer Motorsport
Fastest lap
Driver	(Australia) Jack Doohan	Trident
- Time: 1:52.742 (on lap 18)

Sprint race 2
- Date: 19 June 2021
- Laps: 20
Podium
First	(Monaco) Arthur Leclerc	Prema Racing
Second	(Norway) Dennis Hauger	Prema Racing
Third	(France) Victor Martins	MP Motorsport
Fastest lap
Driver	(France) Victor Martins	MP Motorsport
- Time: 1:52.419 (on lap 19)

Feature race
- Date: 20 June 2021
- Laps: 20
Pole position
Driver	(Denmark) Frederik Vesti	ART Grand Prix
Time	1:50.882	
Podium
First	(Australia) Jack Doohan	Trident
Second	(Norway) Dennis Hauger	Prema Racing
Third	(Brazil) Caio Collet	MP Motorsport
Fastest lap
Driver	(France) Reshad de Gerus	Charouz Racing System
- Time: 1:59.335 (on lap 17)

The 2021 Le Castellet Formula 3 round was the 2nd round of the 2021 FIA Formula 3 Championship. It took place at the Circuit Paul Ricard and ran from 18 to 20 June, featuring 3 races in support of the 2021 French Grand Prix.

== Background ==
FIA Formula 3 last raced here in 2019. It was taken off in 2020 in favor of the Circuit Zandvoort. However, changes to the calendar due to the COVID-19 pandemic and a new cost-cutting measure meant that it returned for 2021. László Tóth tested positive for COVID before the weekend, and he was replaced by Pierre-Louis Chovet, who had been replaced at Jenzer by Johnathan Hoggard for sponsorship reasons. The round was originally scheduled to run from 25 to 27 June, but was rescheduled due to Formula One changing their calendar.

== Classification ==
=== Qualifying ===
The Qualifying session took place on 18 June 2021, with Frederik Vesti besting Dennis Hauger to take his first pole position of the season.

Pos.	No.	Driver	Team	Time/Gap	Grid
1	7	(Denmark) Frederik Vesti	ART Grand Prix	1:50.882	1
2	1	(Norway) Dennis Hauger	Prema Racing	+0.181	2
3	17	(France) Victor Martins	MP Motorsport	+0.240	3
4	4	(Australia) Jack Doohan	Trident	+0.283	4
5	18	(Brazil) Caio Collet	MP Motorsport	+0.305	5
6	5	(France) Clément Novalak	Trident	+0.331	6
7	8	(Russia) Aleksandr Smolyar	ART Grand Prix	+0.387	7
8	11	(Japan) Ayumu Iwasa	Hitech Grand Prix	+0.602	8
9	9	(United States) Juan Manuel Correa	ART Grand Prix	+0.621	9
10	29	(United States) Logan Sargeant	Charouz Racing System	+0.643	10
11	6	(Germany) David Schumacher	Trident	+0.668	11
12	26	(Australia) Calan Williams	Jenzer Motorsport	+0.693	12
13	14	(Italy) Matteo Nannini	HWA Racelab	+0.731	13
14	3	(United Kingdom) Olli Caldwell	Prema Racing	+0.766	14
15	19	(Netherlands) Tijmen van der Helm	MP Motorsport	+0.787	15
16	10	(United States) Jak Crawford	Hitech Grand Prix	+0.836	16
17	12	(Czech Republic) Roman Staněk	Hitech Grand Prix	+0.890	17
18	21	(Italy) Lorenzo Colombo	Campos Racing	+0.927	18
19	22	(Belgium) Amaury Cordeel	Campos Racing	+1.047	19
20	27	(United Kingdom) Johnathan Hoggard	Jenzer Motorsport	+1.169	20
21	30	(Brazil) Enzo Fittipaldi	Charouz Racing System	+1.452	21
22	24	(United States) Kaylen Frederick	Carlin Buzz Racing	+1.571	22
23	25	(United Kingdom) Jonny Edgar	Carlin Buzz Racing	+1.571	23
24	15	(Denmark) Oliver Rasmussen	HWA Racelab	+1.593	24
25	20	(France) Pierre-Louis Chovet	Campos Racing	+1.682	25
26	31	(France) Reshad de Gerus	Charouz Racing System	+1.913	26
27	28	(Romania) Filip Ugran	Jenzer Motorsport	+1.941	27
28	16	(Mexico) Rafael Villagómez	HWA Racelab	+2.064	28
29	23	(Israel) Ido Cohen	Carlin Buzz Racing	+2.141	29
—	2	(Monaco) Arthur Leclerc	Prema Racing	No time set	30
107% time: 1:58.643

=== Sprint Race 1 ===
Pos.	No.	Driver	Team	Laps	Time/Gap	Grid	Pts.
1	8	(Russia) Aleksandr Smolyar	ART Grand Prix	20	38:26.581	6	15
2	17	(France) Victor Martins	MP Motorsport	20	+0.624	10	12
3	26	(Australia) Calan Williams	Jenzer Motorsport	20	+1.212	1	10
4	29	(United States) Logan Sargeant	Charouz Racing System	20	+1.779	3	8
5	5	(France) Clément Novalak	Trident	20	+2.351	7	6
6	9	(United States) Juan Manuel Correa	ART Grand Prix	20	+2.666	4	5
7	4	(Australia) Jack Doohan	Trident	20	+2.765	9	4 (2)
8	11	(Japan) Ayumu Iwasa	Hitech Grand Prix	20	+5.825	5	3
9	1	(Norway) Dennis Hauger	Prema Racing	20	+6.237	11	2
10	3	(United Kingdom) Olli Caldwell	Prema Racing	20	+6.443	14	1
11	10	(United States) Jak Crawford	Hitech Grand Prix	20	+8.057	16	
12	2	(Monaco) Arthur Leclerc	Prema Racing	20	+9.026	30	
13	18	(Brazil) Caio Collet	MP Motorsport	20	+9.396	8	
14	21	(Italy) Lorenzo Colombo	Campos Racing	20	+9.727	18	
15	7	(Denmark) Frederik Vesti	ART Grand Prix	20	+12.700	12	
16	6	(Germany) David Schumacher	Trident	20	+12.954	2	
17	15	(Denmark) Oliver Rasmussen	HWA Racelab	20	+27.985	24	
18	20	(France) Pierre-Louis Chovet	Campos Racing	20	+30.795	25	
19	31	(France) Reshad de Gerus	Charouz Racing System	20	+31.839	26	
20	24	(United States) Kaylen Frederick	Carlin Buzz Racing	20	+32.215	22	
21	30	(Brazil) Enzo Fittipaldi	Charouz Racing System	20	+33.851	21	
22	14	(Italy) Matteo Nannini	HWA Racelab	20	+40.880	13	
23	28	(Romania) Filip Ugran	Jenzer Motorsport	20	+41.087	27	
24	23	(Israel) Ido Cohen	Carlin Buzz Racing	20	+43.736^{1}	29	
25	16	(Mexico) Rafael Villagómez	HWA Racelab	20	+1:01.307	28	
26	12	(Czech Republic) Roman Staněk	Hitech Grand Prix	20	+1:15.743	17	
27	22	(Belgium) Amaury Cordeel	Campos Racing	20	+1:21.513	19	
28	25	(United Kingdom) Jonny Edgar	Carlin Buzz Racing	20	+1:40.817	23	
29	19	(Netherlands) Tijmen van der Helm	MP Motorsport	19	+1 Lap	15	
DNF	27	(United Kingdom) Johnathan Hoggard	Jenzer Motorsport	0	Collision	20	

Notes

- ^1 – Ido Cohen was given a 5 second time penalty for forcing Rafael Villagómez off the track on the final lap at turn 11.

=== Sprint Race 2 ===
Pos.	No.	Driver	Team	Laps	Time/Gap	Grid	Pts.
1	2	(Monaco) Arthur Leclerc	Prema Racing	20	37:46.891	1	15
2	1	(Norway) Dennis Hauger	Prema Racing	20	+4.281	4	12
3	17	(France) Victor Martins	MP Motorsport	20	+8.044	11	10 (2)
4	3	(United Kingdom) Olli Caldwell	Prema Racing	20	+9.383	3	8
5	4	(Australia) Jack Doohan	Trident	20	+10.067	6	6
6	5	(France) Clément Novalak	Trident	20	+12.757	8	5
7	8	(Russia) Aleksandr Smolyar	ART Grand Prix	20	+18.042	12	4
8	26	(Australia) Calan Williams	Jenzer Motorsport	20	+20.664	10	3
9	11	(Japan) Ayumu Iwasa	Hitech Grand Prix	20	+22.190	5	2
10	7	(Denmark) Frederik Vesti	ART Grand Prix	20	+24.930	15	1
11	6	(Germany) David Schumacher	Trident	20	+25.360	16	
12	29	(United States) Logan Sargeant	Charouz Racing System	20	+25.888	9	
13	14	(Italy) Matteo Nannini	HWA Racelab	20	+25.934	22	
14	10	(United States) Jak Crawford	Hitech Grand Prix	20	+26.375	2	
15	20	(France) Pierre-Louis Chovet	Campos Racing	20	+30.986	18	
16	9	(United States) Juan Manuel Correa	ART Grand Prix	20	+31.484	7	
17	30	(Brazil) Enzo Fittipaldi	Charouz Racing System	20	+31.516	21	
18	19	(Netherlands) Tijmen van der Helm	MP Motorsport	20	+33.611	29	
19	12	(Czech Republic) Roman Staněk	Hitech Grand Prix	20	+34.162	26	
20	21	(Italy) Lorenzo Colombo	Campos Racing	20	+35.605^{1}	14	
21	15	(Denmark) Oliver Rasmussen	HWA Racelab	20	+36.908	17	
22	24	(United States) Kaylen Frederick	Carlin Buzz Racing	20	+38.307	20	
23	25	(United Kingdom) Jonny Edgar	Carlin Buzz Racing	20	+42.114	28	
24	22	(Belgium) Amaury Cordeel	Campos Racing	20	+46.254	27	
25	31	(France) Reshad de Gerus	Charouz Racing System	20	+52.030	19	
26	27	(United Kingdom) Johnathan Hoggard	Jenzer Motorsport	20	+56.171	30	
27	16	(Mexico) Rafael Villagómez	HWA Racelab	20	+58.577	25	
28	28	(Romania) Filip Ugran	Jenzer Motorsport	20	+1:02.562	23	
DNF	23	(Israel) Ido Cohen	Carlin Buzz Racing	14	Collision damage	24	
DNF	18	(Brazil) Caio Collet	MP Motorsport	1	Mechanical	13	

Notes

- ^1 – Lorenzo Colombo received a 5 second time penalty for leaving the track and gaining an advantage at turn 9.

=== Feature Race ===
Pos.	No.	Driver	Team	Laps	Time/Gap	Grid	Pts.
1	4	(Australia) Jack Doohan	Trident	20	43:19.510	4	25
2	1	(Norway) Dennis Hauger	Prema Racing	20	+1.551	2	18
3	18	(Brazil) Caio Collet	MP Motorsport	20	+5.051	5	15
4	17	(France) Victor Martins	MP Motorsport	20	+7.237	3	12
5	5	(France) Clément Novalak	Trident	20	+14.245	6	10
6	7	(Denmark) Frederik Vesti	ART Grand Prix	20	+17.942	1	8 (4)
7	11	(Japan) Ayumu Iwasa	Hitech Grand Prix	20	+23.074	8	6
8	8	(Russia) Aleksandr Smolyar	ART Grand Prix	20	+24.883	7	4
9	9	(United States) Juan Manuel Correa	ART Grand Prix	20	+25.549	9	2
10	10	(United States) Jak Crawford	Hitech Grand Prix	20	+28.620	16	1
11	30	(Brazil) Enzo Fittipaldi	Charouz Racing System	20	+34.198	21	
12	26	(Australia) Calan Williams	Jenzer Motorsport	20	+36.018	12	
13	2	(Monaco) Arthur Leclerc	Prema Racing	20	+39.013	30	
14	25	(United Kingdom) Jonny Edgar	Carlin Buzz Racing	20	+41.826	23	
15	12	(Czech Republic) Roman Staněk	Hitech Grand Prix	20	+42.379	17	
16	19	(Netherlands) Tijmen van der Helm	MP Motorsport	20	+44.394	15	
17	24	(United States) Kaylen Frederick	Carlin Buzz Racing	20	+45.339	22	
18	27	(United Kingdom) Johnathan Hoggard	Jenzer Motorsport	20	+45.882	20	
19	21	(Italy) Lorenzo Colombo	Campos Racing	20	+47.672	18	
20	14	(Italy) Matteo Nannini	HWA Racelab	20	+48.519	13	
21	31	(France) Reshad de Gerus	Charouz Racing System	20	+48.859	26	
22	15	(Denmark) Oliver Rasmussen	HWA Racelab	20	+53.917	24	
23	16	(Mexico) Rafael Villagómez	HWA Racelab	20	+54.660	28	
24	23	(Israel) Ido Cohen	Carlin Buzz Racing	20	+56.688	29	
25	22	(Belgium) Amaury Cordeel	Campos Racing	20	+1:02.091	19	
26	28	(Romania) Filip Ugran	Jenzer Motorsport	20	+1:08.247	27	
27	6	(Germany) David Schumacher	Trident	20	+1:08.525	11	
28	20	(France) Pierre-Louis Chovet	Campos Racing	18	+2 Laps	25	
DNF	29	(United States) Logan Sargeant	Charouz Racing System	8	Rain lights	10	
DNF	3	(United Kingdom) Olli Caldwell	Prema Racing	2	Suspension	14	

== Standings after the event ==
Drivers' Championship standings

	Pos.	Driver	Points
	1	(Norway) Dennis Hauger	66
2	2	(France) Victor Martins	60
2	3	(Australia) Jack Doohan	58
1	4	(France) Clément Novalak	49
3	5	(United Kingdom) Olli Caldwell	41

Teams' Championship standings

	Pos.	Team	Points
	1	(Italy) Prema Racing	122
	2	(Italy) Trident	107
	3	(Netherlands) MP Motorsport	95
	4	(France) ART Grand Prix	81
3	5	(United Kingdom) Hitech Grand Prix	19

- Note: Only the top five positions are included for both sets of standings.

== See also ==
- 2021 French Grand Prix

Previous round: 2021 Barcelona Formula 3 round	FIA Formula 3 Championship; 2021 season	Next round: 2021 Spielberg Formula 3 round
Previous round: 2019 Le Castellet Formula 3 round	Le Castellet Formula 3 round	Next round: none
