= László Tóth (racing driver) =

Hungarian racing driver

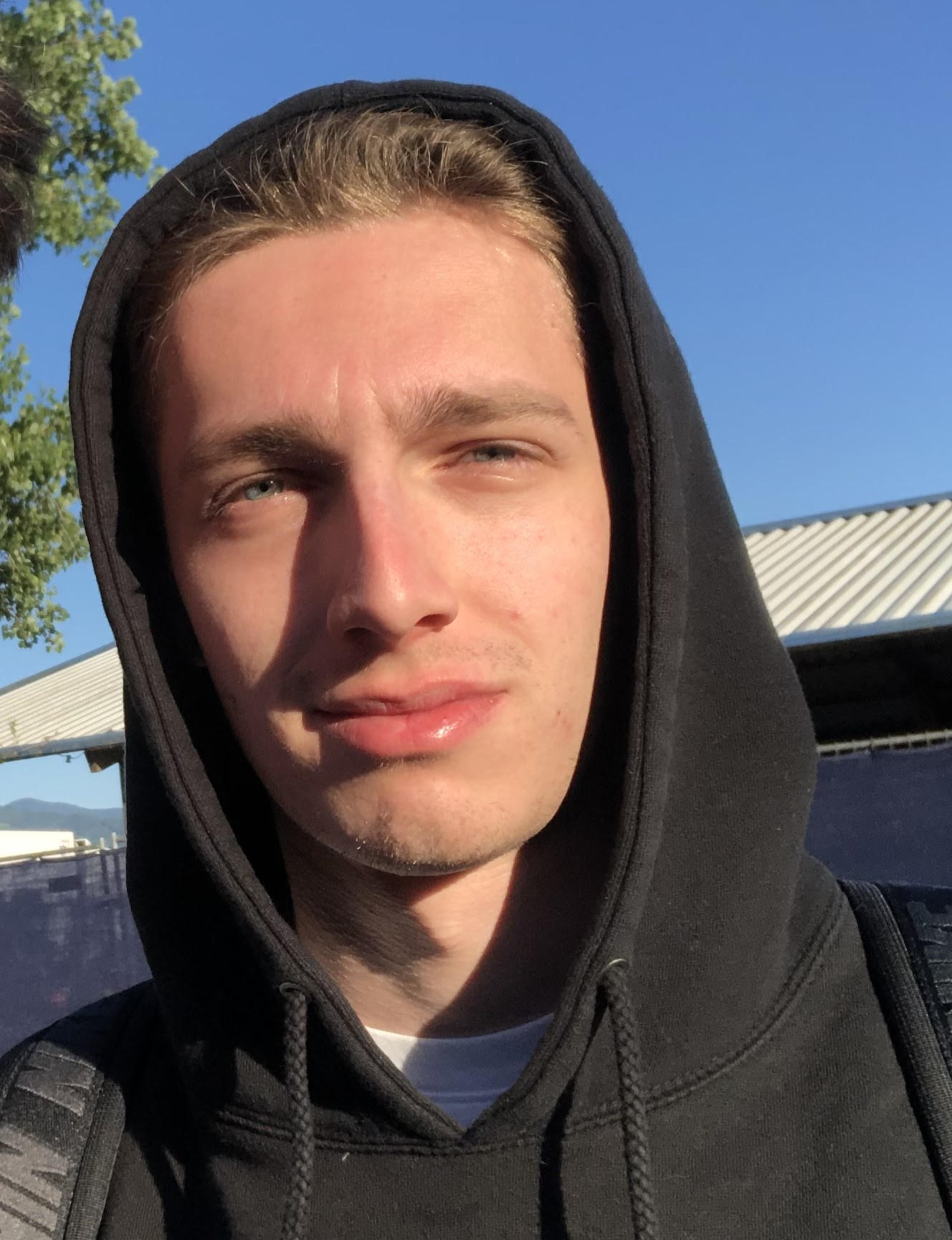
- Tóth in 2022
- Nationality: (Hungary) Hungarian
- Born: 2 June 2000 (age 26) Telki, Pest County, Hungary

Lamborghini Super Trofeo Europe career
- Debut season: 2024
- Current team: Oregon Team
- Car number: 34
- Starts: 9 (9 entries)
- Wins: 0
- Podiums: 0
- Poles: 0
- Fastest laps: 0
- Best finish: 18th in 2024

Previous series
- 2023 2021-2022 2020 2018-2019 2019 2018 2018 2017-18: Asian Le Mans Series; FIA Formula 3 Championship; Formula Renault Eurocup; Italian F4 Championship; ADAC Formula 4 F4 Spanish Championship; SMP F4 Championship; Formula 4 UAE Championship

László Tóth (born 2 June 2000) is a Hungarian racing driver who last competed for Oregon Team in the 2024 Lamborghini Super Trofeo Europe. He recently competed in the 2022 FIA Formula 3 Championship for Charouz Racing System, having previously competed with Campos Racing the previous year. He previously competed in the Italian F4 Championship, ADAC Formula 4 and Formula Renault Eurocup.

== Personal life ==
Tóth is a polyglot: aside from his native Hungarian, he fluently speaks English, French, German and Dutch.

== Early career ==
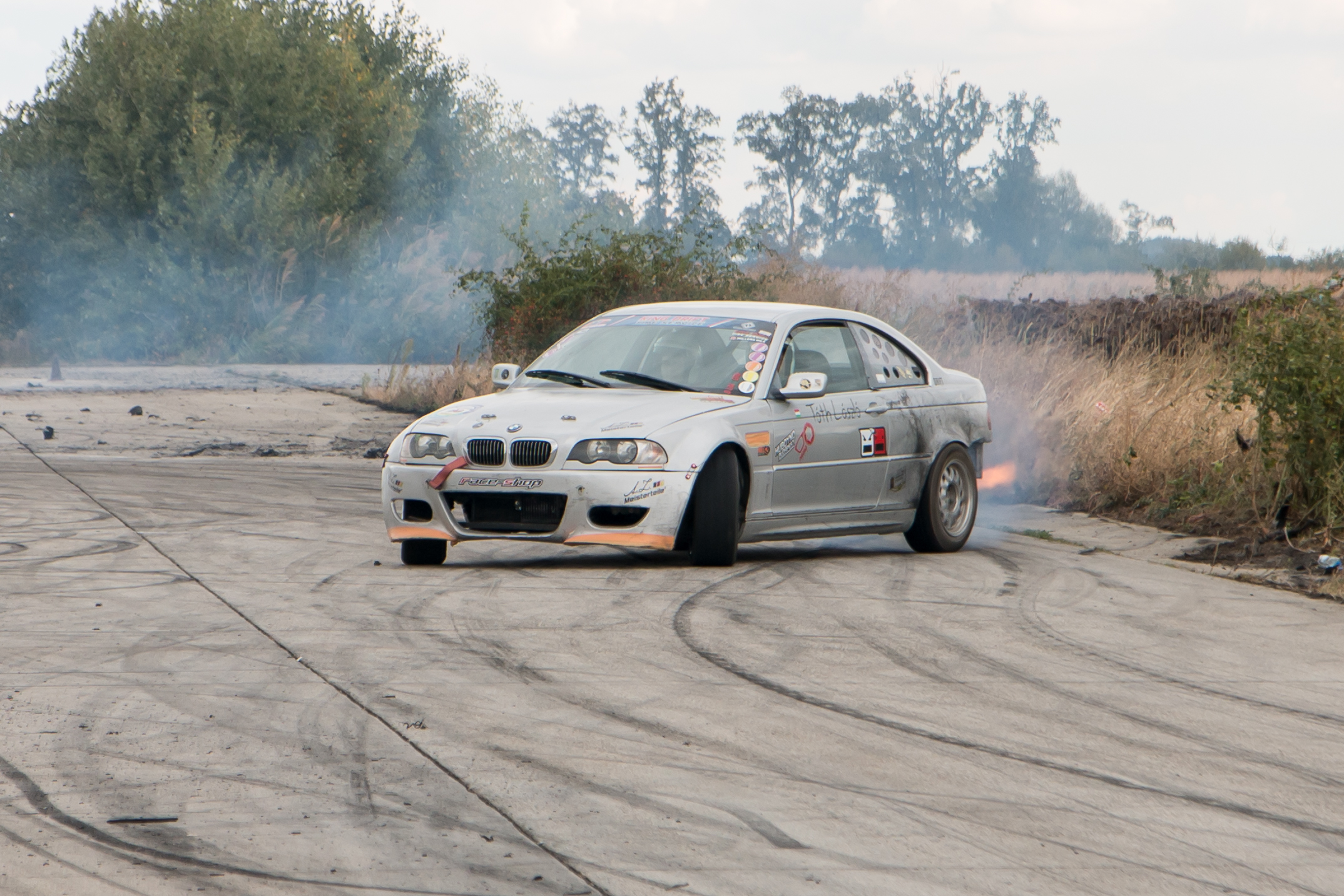
Tóth drifting in a BMW E46

=== Karting ===
Tóth started racing in 2013, learning the basics of racing in karting. He first raced go-karts in Hungary and then competed in the German Championship and Euro Challenge. He later competed in the European and World Karting Championships, with his greatest success of his karting career being third place in the Hungarian championship and Rotax Max Wintercup in 2016 respectively. He ended 48th in the 2017 CIK-FIA Karting European Championship.

=== Lower formulae ===
==== 2018 ====
Tóth made his racing debut during the fourth round of the 2017-18 Formula 4 UAE Championship at the Yas Marina Circuit, competing as a guest driver and achieving a high of ninth place. In 2018, he contested the first three race weekends of the Italian F4 Championship for DR Motorsport, achieving a best finish of 18th and ending 41st in the standings. During the season, he changed to MP Motorsport, contesting five of the six rounds of the F4 Spanish Championship, where he finished eleventh in the overall points standings, having scored 47 points.

==== 2019 ====
In the 2019 season, Tóth competed in ADAC Formula 4 in Germany for the R-ace GP team. Tóth came close to scoring points on several occasions but only managed to do so once at the last round in Sachsenring. Tóth ended 20th in the standings. He also competed in the Italian F4 Championship in three rounds but did not score any points. At the end of the season, he competed in the FIA Motorsport Games representing Team Hungary, and claimed seventh place.

=== Formula Renault Eurocup ===
In February 2020, Bhaitech announced that they had signed Tóth for the final Formula Renault Eurocup season. In the second race of the season, Tóth finished eighth in the points but was subsequently moved up a place through a penalty for Petr Ptáček, who had finished ahead of him, and ended up in seventh place. He scored two more points finishes that season and ended up 16th in the standings.

=== FIA Formula 3 Championship ===
==== 2021 ====
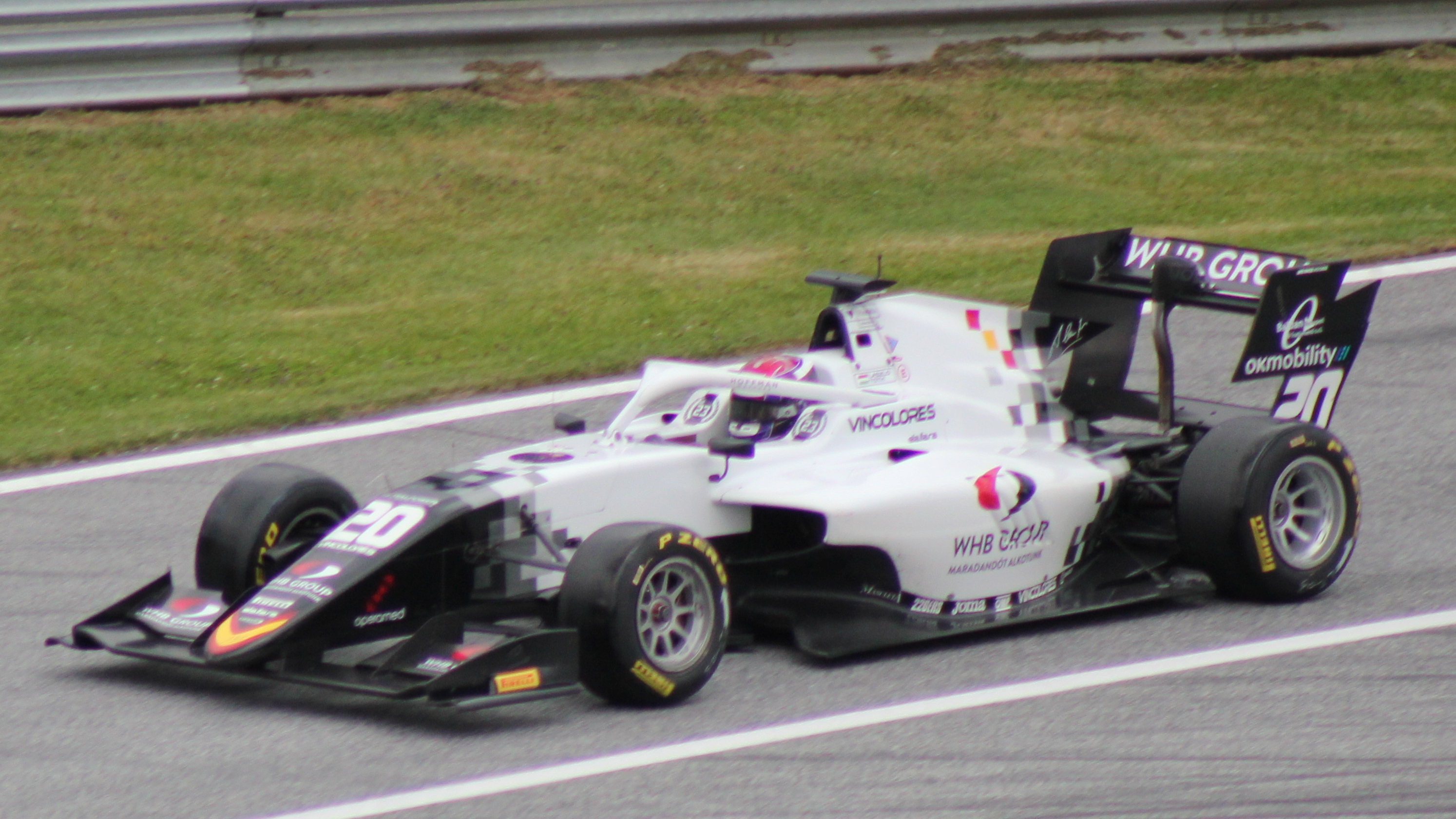
Tóth driving the Dallara F3 2019 during the 2021 Spielberg Formula 3 round.

On 24 March 2021, Campos Racing announced the signing of Tóth for the 2021 season of the Formula 3 Championship on a one-year contract with an optional extension. In the opening weekend in Barcelona, Tóth finished 27th, 23rd and 26th. A few days before the second round of the season, Tóth tested positive for COVID-19, thus ruling him out of racing that weekend. He returned for the round in Spielberg, where he scored his season-best finish of 19th in the first race. At the following round in his native Hungary, Tóth was involved in a collision with Ido Cohen in the final race. Following another pointless weekend in Belgium, Tóth managed to achieve his best result of the season at the penultimate round of the season, finishing 16th in race 2 at Zandvoort. Unfortunately for the Hungarian, his final weekend of the season in Sochi ended without a finish in the top twenty. Tóth finished his campaign 32nd in the standings, ahead of only three part-time competitors.

==== 2022 ====
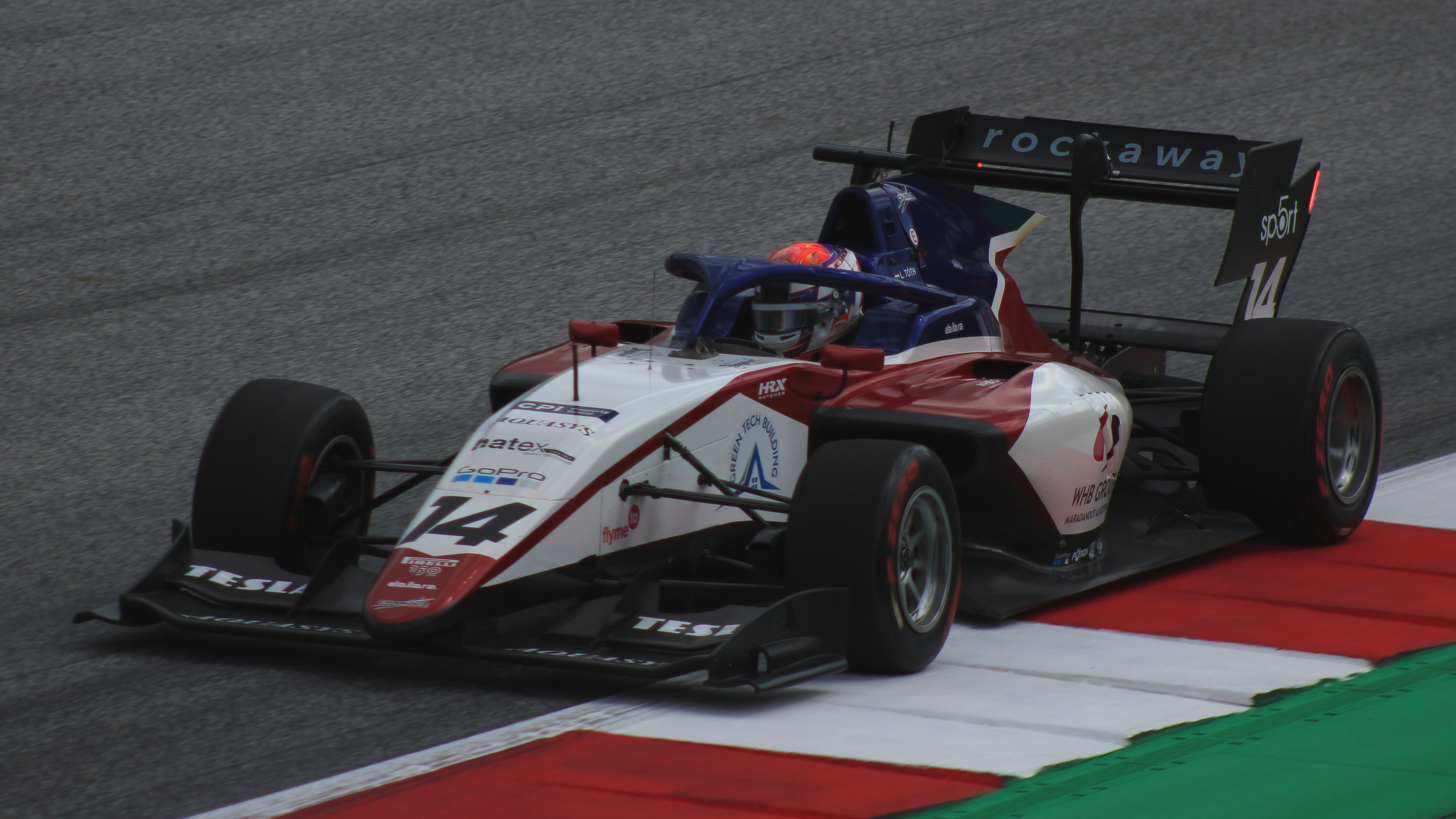
Tóth driving for Charouz Racing System during the 2022 Spielberg Formula 3 round.

Following the end of the season, Tóth tested with Charouz Racing System in all three days of the post-season test in Valencia. On 25 January 2022, the Czech team announced that Tóth would race with the team in the 2022 FIA Formula 3 Championship, stating that he felt "more relaxed" on his second season. Tóth's results did not improve; he only had a best finish of 19th three times while finishing 37th at the end of the championship, the lowest of all full-time drivers.

== Sportscar career ==
=== 2023 ===
Tóth transitioned to sportscar racing at the start of 2023, driving for ARC Bratislava in the LMP2 class of the Asian Le Mans Series. Alongside fellow silver-ranked LMP2 rookie Nico Pino and team owner Miro Konôpka, he managed a best finish of seventh in the nine-car championship, which eventually led to last place in the standings.

=== 2024 ===
After forgoing any competitive racing through the summer the previous year, Tóth would return in 2024, competing for the Oregon Team in the Lamborghini Super Trofeo Europe. He finished 18th in the drivers' championship.

== Karting record ==
=== Karting career summary ===
Season	Series	Team	Position
2015	Rotax Max Challenge Central-Eastern Europe — Junior	Speedworld Academy Pb Skill 7	11th
2015	Rotax Euro Challenge — Rotax Max Junior		48th
2016	Rotax Max Wintercup — Rotax Max Junior	Daems Racing Team	**3rd**
2016	Rotax Max Challenge Central-Eastern Europe — Junior	Hargitai Racing	6th
2016	Hungarian International Open Championship — Junior	Hargitai Racing	**3rd**
2016	Rotax International Open — Junior		10th
2016	Rotax Euro Challenge — Rotax Max Junior		10th
2017	WSK Champions Cup — KZ2	DR Srl	19th
2017	WSK Super Master Series — KZ2	DR Srl	58th
2017	CIK-FIA European Championship — KZ2	DR Srl	48th
2017	CIK-FIA International Super Cup — KZ2		74th

=== Complete CIK-FIA Karting European Championship results ===
(key) (Races in bold indicate pole position) (Races in italics indicate fastest lap)

Year	Team	Class	1	2	3	4	5	6	DC	Points
2017	DR Srl	KZ2	GEN; QH; 47	GEN; R DNQ	LEM; QH; 55	LEM; R DNQ	KRI; QH; 39	KRI; R DNQ	48th	0

== Racing record ==
=== Racing career summary ===
Season	Series	Team	Races	Wins	Poles	F/Laps	Podiums	Points	Position
2017–18	Formula 4 UAE Championship	DR Formula	4	0	0	0	0	0	NC†
2018	Italian F4 Championship	DR Formula	9	0	0	0	0	0	41st
2018	F4 Spanish Championship	MP Motorsport	14	0	0	0	0	47	11th
2018	SMP F4 Championship	MP Motorsport	3	0	0	0	0	0	22nd
2019	ADAC Formula 4 Championship	R-ace GP	20	0	0	0	0	2	20th
2019	Italian F4 Championship	R-ace GP	9	0	0	0	0	0	38th
2019	FIA Motorsport Games Formula 4 Cup	Team Hungary	2	0	0	0	0	N/A	7th
2020	Formula Renault Eurocup	Bhaitech Racing	20	0	0	0	0	14	16th
2021	FIA Formula 3 Championship	Campos Racing	17	0	0	0	0	0	32nd
2022	FIA Formula 3 Championship	Charouz Racing System	18	0	0	0	0	0	37th
2023	Asian Le Mans Series - LMP2	ARC Bratislava	4	0	0	0	0	18	11th
2024	Lamborghini Super Trofeo Europe	Oregon Team	11	0	0	0	0	11	18th

^{†} As Tóth was a guest driver, he was ineligible to score points.

=== Complete Formula 4 UAE Championship results ===
(key) (Races in bold indicate pole position; races in italics indicate fastest lap)

Year	Team	1	2	3	4	5	6	7	8	9	10	11	12	13	14	15	16	17	18	19	20	21	22	23	24	DC	Points
2017–18	DR Formula	YMC1; 1	YMC1; 2	YMC1; 3	YMC1; 4	YMC2; 1	YMC2; 2	YMC2; 3	YMC2; 4	DUB1; 1	DUB1; 2	DUB1; 3	DUB1; 4	YMC3; 1; 12	YMC3; 2; 9	YMC3; 3; 9	YMC3; 4; 11	YMC4; 1	YMC4; 2	YMC4; 3	YMC4; 4	DUB2; 1	DUB2; 2	DUB2; 3	DUB2; 4	NC†	0

^{†} As Tóth was a guest driver, he was ineligible for points.

=== Complete F4 Spanish Championship results ===
(key) (Races in bold indicate pole position) (Races in italics indicate fastest lap)

Year	Team	1	2	3	4	5	6	7	8	9	10	11	12	13	14	15	16	17	18	DC	Points
2018	MP Motorsport	ARA; 1	ARA; 2	ARA; 3	CRT; 1; 5	CRT; 2; 6	CRT; 3; 7	ALG; 1; 8	ALG; 2; 6	ALG; 3; 7	CAT; 1 C	CAT; 2; 8	JER; 1; 10	JER; 2; 9	JER; 3; 8	NAV; 1; 12	NAV; 2; 9	NAV; 3; 8	NAV; 4; 12	11th	47

=== Complete SMP F4 Championship results ===
(key) (Races in bold indicate pole position) (Races in italics indicate fastest lap)

Year	Team	1	2	3	4	5	6	7	8	9	10	11	12	13	14	15	16	17	18	19	20	21	Pos	Points
2018	SMP Racing	SMO; 1	SMO; 2	SMO; 3	NRG; 1	NRG; 2	NRG; 3	MSC; 1	MSC; 2	MSC; 3	ADM; 1	ADM; 2	ADM; 3	AHV; 1	AHV; 2	AHV; 3	ALA; 1	ALA; 2	ALA; 3	ASS; 1; 12	ASS; 2; 11	ASS; 3; 11	22nd	0

=== Complete Italian F4 Championship results ===
(key) (Races in bold indicate pole position) (Races in italics indicate fastest lap)

Year	Team	1	2	3	4	5	6	7	8	9	10	11	12	13	14	15	16	17	18	19	20	21	22	Pos	Points
2018	DR Formula	ADR; 1; 23	ADR; 2; 18	ADR; 3; 20	LEC; 1; 22	LEC; 2; 26	LEC; 3; 28	MNZ; 1 Ret	MNZ; 2; 20	MNZ; 3 Ret	MIS; 1	MIS; 2	MIS; 3	IMO; 1	IMO; 2	IMO; 3	VLL; 1	VLL; 2	VLL; 3	MUG; 1	MUG; 2	MUG; 3		41st	0
2019	R-ace GP	VLL; 1 Ret	VLL; 2; 24	VLL; 3; 25	MIS; 1	MIS; 2	MIS; 3	HUN; 1; 18	HUN; 2; 26	HUN; 3; 28	RBR; 1 Ret	RBR; 2 Ret	RBR; 3; 19	IMO; 1	IMO; 2	IMO; 3	IMO; 4	MUG; 1	MUG; 2	MUG; 3	MNZ; 1	MNZ; 2	MNZ; 3	38th	0

=== Complete ADAC Formula 4 Championship results ===
(key) (Races in bold indicate pole position) (Races in italics indicate fastest lap)

Year	Team	1	2	3	4	5	6	7	8	9	10	11	12	13	14	15	16	17	18	19	20	Pos	Points
2019	R-ace GP	OSC; 1; 17	OSC; 2; 11	OSC; 3; 12	RBR; 1; 20	RBR; 2; 19	RBR; 3 Ret	HOC; 1; 17	HOC; 2; 15	ZAN; 1; 11	ZAN; 2; 18	ZAN; 3 Ret	NÜR; 1; 15	NÜR; 2; 17	NÜR; 3; 14	HOC; 1; 11	HOC; 2; 16	HOC; 3; 12	SAC; 1; 13	SAC; 2 Ret	SAC; 3; 9	20th	2

=== Complete FIA Motorsport Games results ===
Year	Entrant	Cup	Qualifying	Quali Race	Main race
2019	Team Hungary	**Formula 4**	13th	4th	7th

=== Complete Formula Renault Eurocup results ===
(key) (Races in bold indicate pole position) (Races in italics indicate fastest lap)

Year	Team	1	2	3	4	5	6	7	8	9	10	11	12	13	14	15	16	17	18	19	20	DC	Points
2020	Bhaitech Racing	MNZ; 1; 15	MNZ; 2; 7	IMO; 1; 16	IMO; 2; 16	NÜR; 1; 16	NÜR; 2; 14	MAG; 1; 11	MAG; 2; 11	ZAN; 1; 18	ZAN; 2; 16	CAT; 1; 16	CAT; 2; 10	SPA; 1; 15	SPA; 2; 8	IMO; 1 Ret	IMO; 2; 15	HOC; 1; 11	HOC; 2; 14	LEC; 1; 19	LEC; 2; 16	16th	14

=== Complete FIA Formula 3 Championship results ===
(key) (Races in bold indicate pole position; races in italics indicate points for the fastest lap of top ten finishers)

Year	Entrant	1	2	3	4	5	6	7	8	9	10	11	12	13	14	15	16	17	18	19	20	21	DC	Points
2021	Campos Racing	CAT; 1; 27	CAT; 2; 23	CAT; 3; 26	LEC; 1	LEC; 2	LEC; 3	RBR; 1; 19	RBR; 2; 21	RBR; 3; 21	HUN; 1; 27	HUN; 2; 23	HUN; 3 Ret	SPA; 1; 25	SPA; 2; 22	SPA; 3; 23	ZAN; 1; 25	ZAN; 2; 16	ZAN; 3; 24	SOC; 1 Ret	SOC; 2 C	SOC; 3; 22	32nd	0
2022	Charouz Racing System	BHR; SPR; 22	BHR; FEA; 24	IMO; SPR; 19	IMO; FEA; 25	CAT; SPR; 26	CAT; FEA; 23	SIL; SPR; Ret	SIL; FEA; 21	RBR; SPR; 23	RBR; FEA; 19	HUN; SPR; 26	HUN; FEA; Ret	SPA; SPR; 22	SPA; FEA; 25	ZAN; SPR; 27	ZAN; FEA; 22	MNZ; SPR; 22	MNZ; FEA; 19				37th	0

=== Complete Asian Le Mans Series results ===
(key) (Races in bold indicate pole position) (Races in italics indicate fastest lap)

Year	Team	Class	Car	Engine	1	2	3	4	Pos.	Points
2023	ARC Bratislava	LMP2	Oreca 07	Gibson GK428 4.2 L V8	DUB; 1; 7	DUB; 2; 9	ABU; 1; 8	ABU; 2; 7	11th	18

=== Complete Lamborghini Super Trofeo Europe results ===
(key) (Races in bold indicate pole position) (Races in italics indicate fastest lap)

Year	Team	1	2	3	4	5	6	7	8	9	10	11	DC	Points
2024	Oregon Team	IMO; 1; 9	IMO; 2; 10	SPA; 1; 22	SPA; 2 Ret	LMS; 1; 5	NUR; 1; 13	NUR; 2; 10	CAT; 1; 12	CAT; 2; 19	JER; 1; 34	JER; 2; 10	18th	11
