= 2022 Monza Formula 3 round =

Motor racing event

(Italy) 2022 Monza Formula 3 round
Round details
- Round 9 of 9 in the 2022 FIA Formula 3 Championship.
- Location: Autodromo Nazionale di Monza, Monza, Italy
- Course: Permanent Circuit; 5.793 km (3.600 mi)

Sprint Race
- Date: 10 September 2022
- Laps: 18
Podium
| First | (Argentina) Franco Colapinto | Van Amersfoort Racing |
| Second | (United Kingdom) Oliver Bearman | Prema Racing |
| Third | (Brazil) Caio Collet | MP Motorsport |
Fastest lap
| Driver | Alexander Smolyar | MP Motorsport |
- Time: 1:39.160 (on lap 14)

Feature Race
- Date: 11 September 2022
- Laps: 15 (Note: The race was scheduled to be run for 22 laps, but was red-flagged after an accident between Kush Maini and Brad Benavides. Thus, the race distance has been shortened to 15 laps.)
Pole position
| Driver | Alexander Smolyar | MP Motorsport |
| Time | 1:37.559 | |
Podium
| First | (Barbados) Zane Maloney | Trident |
| Second | (United Kingdom) Oliver Bearman | Prema Racing |
| Third | (United States) Jak Crawford | Prema Racing |
Fastest lap
| Driver | (United Kingdom) Jonny Edgar | Trident |
- Time: 1:38.887 (on lap 8)

The 2022 Monza Formula 3 round was a motor racing event held on 10 and 11 September 2022 at the Autodromo Nazionale di Monza, Monza, Italy. It was the ninth and final race of the 2022 FIA Formula 3 Championship, and was held in support of the 2022 Italian Grand Prix.

Victor Martins claimed the Drivers' Championship in chaotic circumstances by achieving a fourth-place finish despite receiving a five-second time penalty. The Frenchman also took benefit of several penalties from other drivers which were given in the aftermath, ultimately securing fourth place to win the title by just five points to eventual race winner Zane Maloney, who took his third consecutive Feature Race victory. Martins was also the first driver from ART Grand Prix who took the Drivers' Championship in modern Formula 3, after drivers from Prema Racing had previously won it in the past three seasons.

However, Prema took its crown back in the Teams' Championship after losing out on Trident in the previous season, taking its third championship in their fourth F3 season.

== Driver changes ==
Venezuelan driver Alessandro Famularo made his debut in the series driving for Charouz Racing System to replace David Schumacher who drove for the Czech squad in the previous round in Zandvoort.

This round also saw the comeback of American driver Hunter Yeany, who returned to the series for the season finale after suffering a broken wrist at the Spielberg round wherefore he was ruled out for four rounds.

== Classification ==
=== Qualifying ===
Russian driver Alexander Smolyar took his second pole position of this season and a joint-record third pole position alongside Dennis Hauger and Logan Sargeant by a fine margin of 0.047 seconds ahead of Zane Maloney in second, with Roman Staněk nearly a further two-tenths adrift in third place.

| Pos. | No. | Driver | Team | Time/Gap | R1 | R2 |
|---|---|---|---|---|---|---|
| 1 | 11 | Alexander Smolyar | MP Motorsport | 1:37.559 | 12 | 1 |
| 2 | 3 | (Barbados) Zane Maloney | Trident | +0.047 | 11 | 2 |
| 3 | 2 | (Czech Republic) Roman Staněk | Trident | +0.191 | 10 | 3 |
| 4 | 7 | (France) Victor Martins | ART Grand Prix | +0.215 | 9 | 4 |
| 5 | 4 | (Monaco) Arthur Leclerc | Prema Racing | +0.386 | 8 | 5 |
| 6 | 6 | (United Kingdom) Oliver Bearman | Prema Racing | +0.401 | 7 | 6 |
| 7 | 25 | (Finland) William Alatalo | Jenzer Motorsport | +0.464 | 6 | 7 |
| 8 | 5 | (United States) Jak Crawford | Prema Racing | +0.472 | 5 | 8 |
| 9 | 1 | (United Kingdom) Jonny Edgar | Trident | +0.550 | 4 | 9 |
| 10 | 22 | (Spain) Pepe Martí | Campos Racing | +0.623 | 3 | 10 |
| 11 | 10 | (Brazil) Caio Collet | MP Motorsport | +0.665 | 2 | 11 |
| 12 | 29 | (Argentina) Franco Colapinto | Van Amersfoort Racing | +0.724 | 1 | 12 |
| 13 | 9 | (United States) Juan Manuel Correa | ART Grand Prix | +0.476 | 22^{1} | 13 |
| 14 | 17 | (United States) Kaylen Frederick | Hitech Grand Prix | +0.885 | 13 | 14 |
| 15 | 8 | (Switzerland) Grégoire Saucy | ART Grand Prix | +0.929 | 14 | 15 |
| 16 | 18 | (France) Isack Hadjar | Hitech Grand Prix | +0.939 | 15 | 16 |
| 17 | 26 | (United Kingdom) Zak O'Sullivan | Carlin | +0.941 | 16 | 17 |
| 18 | 20 | (Spain) David Vidales | Campos Racing | +1.114 | 17 | 18 |
| 19 | 30 | (Mexico) Rafael Villagómez | Van Amersfoort Racing | +1.123 | 18 | 19 |
| 20 | 16 | (Italy) Francesco Pizzi | Charouz Racing System | +1.255 | 29^{1} | 20 |
| 21 | 27 | (United States) Brad Benavides (Note: Benavides is an American-Spanish-Guatemalan driver who competed under a Spanish licence in rounds 1–3 and an American licence in rounds 4–9.) | Carlin | +1.307 | 23^{2} | 21 |
| 22 | 31 | (United Kingdom) Reece Ushijima (Note: Ushijima is a Japanese-American driver competing under a British licence.) | Van Amersfoort Racing | +1.356 | 30^{1} | 22 |
| 23 | 21 | (United States) Hunter Yeany | Campos Racing | +1.546 | 19 | 23 |
| 24 | 23 | (Israel) Ido Cohen | Jenzer Motorsport | +1.563 | 20 | 24 |
| 25 | 28 | (Italy) Enzo Trulli | Carlin | +1.603 | 21 | 25 |
| 26 | 24 | (Italy) Federico Malvestiti | Jenzer Motorsport | +2.089 | 24 | 26 |
| 27 | 19 | (Malaysia) Nazim Azman | Hitech Grand Prix | +2.241 | 25 | 27 |
| 28 | 12 | (India) Kush Maini | MP Motorsport | +2.449 | 26 | 28 |
| 29 | 14 | (Hungary) László Tóth | Charouz Racing System | +2.758 | 27 | 29 |
| 30 | 15 | (Italy) Alessandro Famularo (Note: Famularo is a Venezuelan driver competing under an Italian licence.) | Charouz Racing System | +3.301 | 28 | 30 |

Notes:

- ^1 – Juan Manuel Correa, Francesco Pizzi and Reece Ushijima all received ten-place grid penalties for the Sprint race due to failing to slow under double yellow flags. Additionally, Correa got his fastest lap time deleted.
- ^2 – Brad Benavides received a three-place grid penalty for the Sprint race for causing a collision with William Alatalo at the Feature Race in Zandvoort.

=== Sprint race ===
| Pos. | No. | Driver | Team | Laps | Time/Gap | Grid | Pts. |
|---|---|---|---|---|---|---|---|
| 1 | 29 | (Argentina) Franco Colapinto | Van Amersfoort Racing | 18 | 34:09.813 | 1 | 10 |
| 2 | 6 | (United Kingdom) Oliver Bearman | Prema Racing | 18 | +0.432 | 7 | 9 |
| 3 | 10 | (Brazil) Caio Collet | MP Motorsport | 18 | +2.109 | 2 | 8 |
| 4 | 3 | (Barbados) Zane Maloney | Trident | 18 | +3.404 | 11 | 7 |
| 5 | 1 | (United Kingdom) Jonny Edgar | Trident | 18 | +4.121 | 4 | 6 |
| 6 | 8 | (Switzerland) Grégoire Saucy | ART Grand Prix | 18 | +4.279 | 14 | 5 |
| 7 | 5 | (United States) Jak Crawford | Prema Racing | 18 | +4.614 | 5 | 4 |
| 8 | 4 | (Monaco) Arthur Leclerc | Prema Racing | 18 | +6.061 | 8 | 3 |
| 9 | 22 | (Spain) Pepe Martí | Campos Racing | 18 | +6.547 | 3 | 2 |
| 10 | 7 | (France) Victor Martins | ART Grand Prix | 18 | +6.878 | 9 | 1 |
| 11 | 12 | (India) Kush Maini | MP Motorsport | 18 | +7.755 | 26 | |
| 12 | 2 | (Czech Republic) Roman Staněk | Trident | 18 | +7.983 | 10 | |
| 13 | 9 | (United States) Juan Manuel Correa | ART Grand Prix | 18 | +8.157 | 22 | |
| 14 | 25 | (Finland) William Alatalo | Jenzer Motorsport | 18 | +9.252 | 6 | |
| 15 | 23 | (Israel) Ido Cohen | Jenzer Motorsport | 18 | +12.316 | 20 | |
| 16 | 24 | (Italy) Federico Malvestiti | Jenzer Motorsport | 18 | +12.998 | 24 | |
| 17 | 16 | (Italy) Francesco Pizzi | Charouz Racing System | 18 | +13.468 | 29 | |
| 18 | 27 | (United States) Brad Benavides | Carlin | 18 | +13.750^{3} | 23 | |
| 19 | 31 | (United Kingdom) Reece Ushijima | Van Amersfoort Racing | 18 | +15.953 | 30 | |
| 20 | 28 | (Italy) Enzo Trulli | Carlin | 18 | +17.476 | 21 | |
| 21 | 19 | (Malaysia) Nazim Azman | Hitech Grand Prix | 18 | +18.710 | 25 | |
| 22 | 14 | (Hungary) László Tóth | Charouz Racing System | 18 | +22.362 | 27 | |
| 23 | 15 | (Italy) Alessandro Famularo | Charouz Racing System | 18 | +30.912 | 28 | |
| 24 | 21 | (United States) Hunter Yeany | Campos Racing | 18 | +50.936 | 19 | |
| 25 | 11 | Alexander Smolyar | MP Motorsport | 18 | +1:09.799 | 12 | |
| 26 | 30 | (Mexico) Rafael Villagómez | Van Amersfoort Racing | 18 | +1:10.263 | 18 | |
| 27 | 18 | (France) Isack Hadjar | Hitech Grand Prix | 18 | +1:10.409 | 15 | |
| DNF | 17 | (United States) Kaylen Frederick | Hitech Grand Prix | 11 | Mechanical | 13 | |
| DNF | 26 | (United Kingdom) Zak O'Sullivan | Carlin | 3 | Accident | 16 | |
| DNS | 20 | (Spain) David Vidales | Campos Racing | — | Did not start^{4} | 17 | |
Fastest lap set by Alexander Smolyar: 1:39.160 (lap 14)

Notes:

- ^3 – Brad Benavides originally finished in fourteenth, but was later given a five-second time penalty for leaving the track and gaining an advantage, demoting him to eighteenth place.
- ^4 – David Vidales stalled on the grid at the formation lap and was unable to start the race. Thus, his grid slot was left vacant.

=== Feature race ===
The Feature Race was originally scheduled to be run for 22 laps, but was later red-flagged on lap 18 after a collision between Kush Maini and Brad Benavides, that damaged the barrier. However, race direction decided that the race would not be resumed, with the final results have been taken into account from lap 15. As a consequence, Zane Maloney won the final race of the season and took his third consecutive Feature Race win, finishing ahead of both Prema drivers Oliver Bearman and Jak Crawford.

| Pos. | No. | Driver | Team | Laps | Time/Gap | Grid | Pts. |
|---|---|---|---|---|---|---|---|
| 1 | 3 | (Barbados) Zane Maloney | Trident | 15 | 28:00.288 | 2 | 25 |
| 2 | 6 | (United Kingdom) Oliver Bearman | Prema Racing | 15 | +0.587 | 6 | 18 |
| 3 | 5 | (United States) Jak Crawford | Prema Racing | 15 | +5.024 | 8 | 15 |
| 4 | 7 | (France) Victor Martins | ART Grand Prix | 15 | +6.061^{5} | 4 | 12 |
| 5 | 4 | (Monaco) Arthur Leclerc | Prema Racing | 15 | +6.086 | 5 | 10 |
| 6 | 2 | (Czech Republic) Roman Staněk | Trident | 15 | +6.420 | 3 | 8 |
| 7 | 25 | (Finland) William Alatalo | Jenzer Motorsport | 15 | +9.628^{5} | 7 | 6 |
| 8 | 1 | (United Kingdom) Jonny Edgar | Trident | 15 | +12.080^{5} | 9 | 4 (1) |
| 9 | 18 | (France) Isack Hadjar | Hitech Grand Prix | 15 | +13.555 | 16 | 2 |
| 10 | 31 | (United Kingdom) Reece Ushijima | Van Amersfoort Racing | 15 | +14.228 | 22 | 1 |
| 11 | 26 | (United Kingdom) Zak O'Sullivan | Carlin | 15 | +14.696 | 17 | |
| 12 | 23 | (Israel) Ido Cohen | Jenzer Motorsport | 15 | +15.613 | 24 | |
| 13 | 12 | (India) Kush Maini | MP Motorsport | 15 | +18.031 | 28 | |
| 14 | 27 | (United States) Brad Benavides | Carlin | 15 | +18.031 | 21 | |
| 15 | 29 | (Argentina) Franco Colapinto | Van Amersfoort Racing | 15 | +18.031 | 12 | |
| 16 | 16 | (Italy) Francesco Pizzi | Charouz Racing System | 15 | +21.196 | 20 | |
| 17 | 21 | (United States) Hunter Yeany | Campos Racing | 15 | +21.298^{6} | 23 | |
| 18 | 24 | (Italy) Federico Malvestiti | Jenzer Motorsport | 15 | +21.807 | 26 | |
| 19 | 14 | (Hungary) Lászlo Tóth | Charouz Racing System | 15 | +23.790 | 29 | |
| 20 | 10 | (Brazil) Caio Collet | MP Motorsport | 15 | +24.324^{5} | 11 | |
| 21 | 19 | (Malaysia) Nazim Azman | Hitech Grand Prix | 15 | +29.215 | 27 | |
| 22 | 28 | (Italy) Enzo Trulli | Carlin | 15 | +30.145 | 25 | |
| 23 | 15 | (Italy) Alessandro Famularo | Charouz Racing System | 15 | +43.109 | 30 | |
| 24 | 9 | (United States) Juan Manuel Correa | ART Grand Prix | 15 | +1:01.827 | 13 | |
| 25 | 17 | (United States) Kaylen Frederick | Hitech Grand Prix | 15 | +1:02.568 | 14 | |
| 26 | 22 | (Spain) Pepe Martí | Campos Racing | 15 | +1:33.017 | 10 | |
| 27 | 11 | Alexander Smolyar | MP Motorsport | 14 | +1 lap | 1 | (2) |
| 28 | 8 | (Switzerland) Grégoire Saucy | ART Grand Prix | 13 | +2 laps | 15 | |
| DNF | 30 | (Mexico) Rafael Villagómez | Van Amersfoort Racing | 0 | Collision | 19 | |
| DNF | 20 | (Spain) David Vidales | Campos Racing | 0 | Collision | 18 | |
Fastest lap set by (United Kingdom) Jonny Edgar: 1:38.887 (lap 8)

Notes:

- ^5 – Victor Martins, William Alatalo, Jonny Edgar and Caio Collet all received five-second time penalties for exceeding track limits on multiple occasions.
- ^6 – Hunter Yeany received a five-second time penalty for forcing another driver off the track.

== Final Championship standings ==
Drivers' Championship standings

| | Pos. | Driver | Points |
|---|---|---|---|
| | 1 | (France) Victor Martins | 139 |
| 3 | 2 | (Barbados) Zane Maloney | 134 |
| 1 | 3 | (United Kingdom) Oliver Bearman | 132 |
| 2 | 4 | (France) Isack Hadjar | 123 |
| 2 | 5 | (Czech Republic) Roman Staněk | 117 |

Teams' Championship standings

| Pos. | Team | Points |
|---|---|---|
| 1 | (Italy) Prema Racing | 355 |
| 2 | (Italy) Trident | 301 |
| 3 | (France) ART Grand Prix | 208 |
| 4 | (Netherlands) MP Motorsport | 195 |
| 5 | (United Kingdom) Hitech Grand Prix | 150 |

- Note: Only the top five positions are included for both sets of standings.
- Note: Bold names include the Drivers' and Teams' Champion respectively.

== See also ==
- 2022 Italian Grand Prix
- 2022 Monza Formula 2 round

== Notes ==
| Previous round: 2022 Zandvoort Formula 3 round | FIA Formula 3 Championship; 2022 season | Next round: 2023 Sakhir Formula 3 round |
| Previous round: 2020 Monza Formula 3 round | Monza Formula 3 round | Next round: 2023 Monza Formula 3 round |
