= 2022 Zandvoort Formula 3 round =

Car racing competition

(Netherlands) 2022 Zandvoort Formula 3 round
Round details
- Round 8 of 9 in the 2022 FIA Formula 3 Championship.
- Layout of the Zandvoort circuit
- Location: Circuit Zandvoort, Zandvoort, Netherlands
- Course: Permanent racing facility 4.259 km (2.646 mi)

Sprint race
- Date: 3 September 2022
- Laps: 21
Podium
| First | (Brazil) Caio Collet | MP Motorsport |
| Second | (United States) Juan Manuel Correa | ART Grand Prix |
| Third | (United Kingdom) Zak O'Sullivan | Carlin |
Fastest lap
| Driver | (Brazil) Caio Collet | MP Motorsport |
- Time: 1:27.259 (on 21)

Feature Race
- Date: 4 September 2022
- Laps: 26
Pole position
| Driver | (Barbados) Zane Maloney | Trident |
| Time | 1:24.386 | |
Podium
| First | (Barbados) Zane Maloney | Trident |
| Second | (France) Victor Martins | ART Grand Prix |
| Third | (Argentina) Franco Colapinto | Van Amersfoort Racing |
Fastest lap
| Driver | (Barbados) Zane Maloney | Trident |
- Time: 1:27.100 (on lap 2)

The 2022 Zandvoort Formula 3 round was a motor racing event held on 3 and 4 September 2022 at the Circuit Zandvoort, Zandvoort, Netherlands. It was the penultimate race of the 2022 FIA Formula 3 Championship, and was held in support of the 2022 Dutch Grand Prix.

== Driver changes ==
Due to their commitments at the 2022 Euroformula Open Championship in Imola this weekend, Oliver Goethe and Christian Mansell missed the Zandvoort round and were replaced by Sebastián Montoya and David Schumacher, driving for Campos Racing and Charouz Racing System respectively.

== Classification ==
=== Qualifying ===
Zane Maloney took pole position ahead of Victor Martins and Jak Crawford. By securing his second pole in this season, the Bajan driver was the first driver in this season to become a repeat polesitter.

| Pos. | No. | Driver | Team | Time/Gap | R1 | R2 |
|---|---|---|---|---|---|---|
| 1 | 3 | (Barbados) Zane Maloney | Trident | 1:24.386 | 12 | 1 |
| 2 | 7 | (France) Victor Martins | ART Grand Prix | +0.289 | 11 | 2 |
| 3 | 5 | (United States) Jak Crawford | Prema Racing | +0.436 | 10 | 3 |
| 4 | 2 | (Czech Republic) Roman Staněk | Trident | +0.445 | 9 | 4 |
| 5 | 29 | (Argentina) Franco Colapinto | Van Amersfoort Racing | +0.469 | 8 | 5 |
| 6 | 18 | (France) Isack Hadjar | Hitech Grand Prix | +0.643 | 7 | 6 |
| 7 | 21 | (Colombia) Sebastián Montoya | Campos Racing | +0.652 | 6 | 7 |
| 8 | 1 | (United Kingdom) Jonny Edgar | Trident | +0.661 | 5 | 8 |
| 9 | 10 | (Brazil) Caio Collet | MP Motorsport | +0.786 | 4 | 9 |
| 10 | 26 | (United Kingdom) Zak O'Sullivan | Carlin | +0.825 | 3 | 10 |
| 11 | 8 | (Switzerland) Grégoire Saucy | ART Grand Prix | +0.979 | 2 | 11 |
| 12 | 9 | (United States) Juan Manuel Correa | ART Grand Prix | +0.990 | 1 | 12 |
| 13 | 12 | (India) Kush Maini | MP Motorsport | +1.124 | 18^{1} | 13 |
| 14 | 6 | (United Kingdom) Oliver Bearman | Prema Racing | +1.169 | 13 | 14 |
| 15 | 27 | (United States) Brad Benavides (Note: Benavides is an American-Spanish-Guatemalan driver who competed under a Spanish licence in rounds 1–3 and an American licence in rounds 4–9.) | Carlin | +1.209 | 14 | 15 |
| 16 | 11 | Alexander Smolyar | MP Motorsport | +1.232 | 15 | 16 |
| 17 | 22 | (Spain) Pepe Martí | Campos Racing | +1.242 | 16 | 17 |
| 18 | 17 | (United States) Kaylen Frederick | Hitech Grand Prix | +1.251 | 17 | 18 |
| 19 | 30 | (Mexico) Rafael Villagómez | Van Amersfoort Racing | +1.282 | 19 | 19 |
| 20 | 4 | (Monaco) Arthur Leclerc | Prema Racing | +1.298 | 20 | 20 |
| 21 | 16 | (Italy) Francesco Pizzi | Charouz Racing System | +1.376 | 21 | 21 |
| 22 | 25 | (Finland) William Alatalo | Jenzer Motorsport | +1.414 | 22 | 22 |
| 23 | 31 | (United Kingdom) Reece Ushijima (Note: Ushijima is a Japanese-American driver competing under a British licence.) | Van Amersfoort Racing | +1.440 | 23 | 23 |
| 24 | 28 | (Italy) Enzo Trulli | Carlin | +1.862 | 24 | 24 |
| 25 | 23 | (Israel) Ido Cohen | Jenzer Motorsport | +1.865 | 25 | 25 |
| 26 | 20 | (Spain) David Vidales | Campos Racing | +2.017 | 26 | 26 |
| 27 | 15 | (Germany) David Schumacher | Charouz Racing System | +2.245 | 27 | 27 |
| 28 | 24 | (Italy) Federico Malvestiti | Jenzer Motorsport | +2.249 | 28 | 28 |
| 29 | 19 | (Malaysia) Nazim Azman | Hitech Grand Prix | +2.780 | 29 | 29 |
| 30 | 14 | (Hungary) László Tóth | Charouz Racing System | +4.267 | 30 | 30 |

Notes:

- ^1 – Kush Maini received a five-place grid penalty for the Sprint Race due to causing a collision on the opening lap of the Feature Race in the previous round in Belgium.

=== Sprint race ===
| Pos. | No. | Driver | Team | Laps | Time/Gap | Grid | Pts. |
|---|---|---|---|---|---|---|---|
| 1 | 10 | (Brazil) Caio Collet | MP Motorsport | 21 | 30:55.183 | 4 | 10 (1) |
| 2 | 9 | (United States) Juan Manuel Correa | ART Grand Prix | 21 | +4.057 | 1 | 9 |
| 3 | 26 | (United Kingdom) Zak O'Sullivan | Carlin | 21 | +4.935 | 3 | 8 |
| 4 | 1 | (United Kingdom) Jonny Edgar | Trident | 21 | +5.888 | 5 | 7 |
| 5 | 8 | (Switzerland) Grégoire Saucy | ART Grand Prix | 21 | +6.628 | 2 | 6 |
| 6 | 18 | (France) Isack Hadjar | Hitech Grand Prix | 21 | +7.593 | 7 | 5 |
| 7 | 7 | (France) Victor Martins | ART Grand Prix | 21 | +8.184 | 11 | 4 |
| 8 | 21 | (Colombia) Sebastián Montoya | Campos Racing | 21 | +9.903 | 6 | 3 |
| 9 | 5 | (United States) Jak Crawford | Prema Racing | 21 | +10.599 | 10 | 2 |
| 10 | 2 | (Czech Republic) Roman Staněk | Trident | 21 | +11.028 | 9 | 1 |
| 11 | 6 | (United Kingdom) Oliver Bearman | Prema Racing | 21 | +12.399 | 13 | |
| 12 | 4 | (Monaco) Arthur Leclerc | Prema Racing | 21 | +15.688 | 20 | |
| 13 | 29 | (Argentina) Franco Colapinto | Van Amersfoort Racing | 21 | +17.290 | 8 | |
| 14 | 11 | Alexander Smolyar | MP Motorsport | 21 | +17.941 | 15 | |
| 15 | 17 | (United States) Kaylen Frederick | Hitech Grand Prix | 21 | +19.994 | 17 | |
| 16 | 16 | (Italy) Francesco Pizzi | Charouz Racing System | 21 | +20.638 | 21 | |
| 17 | 3 | (Barbados) Zane Maloney | Trident | 21 | +21.116 | 12 | |
| 18 | 12 | (India) Kush Maini | MP Motorsport | 21 | +23.870 | 18 | |
| 19 | 22 | (Spain) Pepe Martí | Campos Racing | 21 | +23.930 | 16 | |
| 20 | 15 | (Germany) David Schumacher | Charouz Racing System | 21 | +24.193 | 27 | |
| 21 | 20 | (Spain) David Vidales | Campos Racing | 21 | +24.583 | 26 | |
| 22 | 31 | (United Kingdom) Reece Ushijima | Van Amersfoort Racing | 21 | +27.177 | 23 | |
| 23 | 28 | (Italy) Enzo Trulli | Carlin | 21 | +30.780 | 24 | |
| 24 | 24 | (Italy) Federico Malvestiti | Jenzer Motorsport | 21 | +31.218 | 28 | |
| 25 | 19 | (Malaysia) Nazim Azman | Hitech Grand Prix | 21 | +34.656 | 29 | |
| 26 | 27 | (United States) Brad Benavides | Carlin | 21 | +44.181 | 14 | |
| 27 | 14 | (Hungary) László Tóth | Charouz Racing System | 21 | +1:03.611 | 30 | |
| 28 | 30 | (Mexico) Rafael Villagómez | Van Amersfoort Racing | 21 | +1:15.548 | 19 | |
| 29 | 23 | (Israel) Ido Cohen | Jenzer Motorsport | 20 | +1 lap | 25 | |
| 30 | 25 | (Finland) William Alatalo | Jenzer Motorsport | 20 | +1 lap | 22 | |
Fastest lap set by (Brazil) Caio Collet: 1:27.259 (lap 21)

=== Feature race ===
| Pos. | No. | Driver | Team | Laps | Time/Gap | Grid | Pts. |
|---|---|---|---|---|---|---|---|
| 1 | 3 | (Barbados) Zane Maloney | Trident | 26 | 44:04.515 | 1 | 25 (3) |
| 2 | 7 | (France) Victor Martins | ART Grand Prix | 26 | +1.091 | 2 | 18 |
| 3 | 29 | (Argentina) Franco Colapinto | Van Amersfoort Racing | 26 | +1.417 | 5 | 15 |
| 4 | 2 | (Czech Republic) Roman Staněk | Trident | 26 | +2.188 | 4 | 12 |
| 5 | 18 | (France) Isack Hadjar | Hitech Grand Prix | 26 | +2.750 | 6 | 10 |
| 6 | 5 | (United States) Jak Crawford | Prema Racing | 26 | +2.978 | 3 | 8 |
| 7 | 10 | (Brazil) Caio Collet | MP Motorsport | 26 | +4.378 | 9 | 6 |
| 8 | 21 | (Colombia) Sebastián Montoya | Campos Racing | 26 | +5.275 | 7 | 4 |
| 9 | 1 | (United Kingdom) Jonny Edgar | Trident | 26 | +5.568 | 8 | 2 |
| 10 | 11 | Alexander Smolyar | MP Motorsport | 26 | +9.368 | 16 | 1 |
| 11 | 12 | (India) Kush Maini | MP Motorsport | 26 | +10.822 | 13 | |
| 12 | 4 | (Monaco) Arthur Leclerc | Prema Racing | 26 | +11.222 | 20 | |
| 13 | 17 | (United States) Kaylen Frederick | Hitech Grand Prix | 26 | +12.218 | 18 | |
| 14 | 22 | (Spain) Pepe Martí | Campos Racing | 26 | +12.930 | 17 | |
| 15 | 15 | (Germany) David Schumacher | Charouz Racing System | 26 | +13.624 | 27 | |
| 16 | 23 | (Israel) Ido Cohen | Jenzer Motorsport | 26 | +14.797 | 25 | |
| 17 | 28 | (Italy) Enzo Trulli | Carlin | 26 | +15.456 | 24 | |
| 18 | 16 | (Italy) Francesco Pizzi | Charouz Racing System | 26 | +15.607 | 21 | |
| 19 | 31 | (United Kingdom) Reece Ushijima | Van Amersfoort Racing | 26 | +16.075 | 23 | |
| 20 | 24 | (Italy) Federico Malvestiti | Jenzer Motorsport | 26 | +16.456 | 28 | |
| 21 | 19 | (Malaysia) Nazim Azman | Hitech Grand Prix | 26 | +17.013 | 29 | |
| 22 | 14 | (Hungary) Lászlo Tóth | Charouz Racing System | 26 | +17.529 | 30 | |
| 23 | 26 | (United Kingdom) Zak O'Sullivan | Carlin | 26 | +20.128^{2} | 10 | |
| 24 | 9 | (United States) Juan Manuel Correa | ART Grand Prix | 26 | +24.299^{2} | 12 | |
| 25 | 6 | (United Kingdom) Oliver Bearman | Prema Racing | 26 | +28.495^{3} | 14 | |
| DNF | 8 | (Switzerland) Grégoire Saucy | ART Grand Prix | 22 | Collision (Suspension failure) | 11 | |
| DNF | 30 | (Mexico) Rafael Villagómez | Van Amersfoort Racing | 21 | Collision | 19 | |
| DNF | 20 | (Spain) David Vidales | Campos Racing | 16 | Mechanical | 26 | |
| DNF | 27 | (United States) Brad Benavides | Carlin | 3 | Collision | 15 | |
| DNF | 25 | (Finland) William Alatalo | Jenzer Motorsport | 3 | Collision | 22 | |
Fastest lap set by (Barbados) Zane Maloney: 1:27.100 (lap 2)

Notes:

- ^2 – Zak O'Sullivan and Juan Manuel Correa originally finished twelfth and eighteenth, but were later given a ten-second time penalty for causing a collision with Oliver Bearman and Rafael Villagómez respectively.
- ^3 – Oliver Bearman originally finished tenth, but has been later awarded a drive-through penalty for failing to maintain the proper gap behind the Safety Car. As the penalty could not be served in the race, it has been converted to a 20-second time penalty.

== Standings after the event ==
Drivers' Championship standings

| | Pos. | Driver | Points |
|---|---|---|---|
| 2 | 1 | (France) Victor Martins | 126 |
| 1 | 2 | (France) Isack Hadjar | 121 |
| 2 | 3 | (Czech Republic) Roman Staněk | 109 |
| 2 | 4 | (United Kingdom) Oliver Bearman | 105 |
| 2 | 5 | (Barbados) Zane Maloney | 102 |

Teams' Championship standings

| | Pos. | Team | Points |
|---|---|---|---|
| | 1 | (Italy) Prema Racing | 296 |
| | 2 | (Italy) Trident | 250 |
| 1 | 3 | (France) ART Grand Prix | 190 |
| 1 | 4 | (Netherlands) MP Motorsport | 185 |
| | 5 | (United Kingdom) Hitech Grand Prix | 148 |

- Note: Only the top five positions are included for both sets of standings.

== See also ==
- 2022 Dutch Grand Prix
- 2022 Zandvoort Formula 2 round

== Notes ==
| Previous round: 2022 Spa-Francorchamps Formula 3 round | FIA Formula 3 Championship; 2022 season | Next round: 2022 Monza Formula 3 round |
| Previous round: 2021 Zandvoort Formula 3 round | Zandvoort Formula 3 round | Next round: none |
