= 2022 Budapest Formula 3 round =

Motor racing competition

(Hungary) 2022 Budapest Formula 3 round
Round details
- Round 6 of 9 in the 2022 FIA Formula 3 Championship.
- Layout of the Hungaroring
- Location: Hungaroring; Mogyoród, Hungary
- Course: Permanent racing circuit 4.381 km (2.722 mi)

Sprint Race
- Date: 30 July 2022
- Laps: 18
Podium
| First | (Brazil) Caio Collet | MP Motorsport |
| Second | (Argentina) Franco Colapinto | Van Amersfoort Racing |
| Third | (India) Kush Maini | MP Motorsport |
Fastest lap
| Driver | (Brazil) Caio Collet | MP Motorsport |
- Time: 1:50.440 (on lap 18)

Feature Race
- Date: 31 July 2022
- Laps: 24
Pole position
| Driver | Alexander Smolyar | MP Motorsport |
| Time | 1:32.740 | |
Podium
| First | Alexander Smolyar | MP Motorsport |
| Second | (Barbados) Zane Maloney | Trident |
| Third | (United Kingdom) Oliver Bearman | Prema Racing |
Fastest lap
| Driver | (United Kingdom) Zak O'Sullivan | Carlin |
- Time: 1:38.070 (on lap 21)

The 2022 Budapest Formula 3 round was a motor racing event held on 30 and 31 July 2022 at the Hungaroring, Mogyoród, Hungary. It was the sixth round of the 2022 FIA Formula 3 Championship, and was held in support of the 2022 Hungarian Grand Prix.

With Caio Collet and Alexander Smolyar winning the Sprint Race and the Feature Race respectively, MP Motorsport became the first team after Hitech Grand Prix in 2019 Silverstone Formula 3 round to win both races in a Formula 3 weekend.

== Driver changes ==
Some driver changes occurred prior to the Budapest round, with current Euroformula Open championship leader Oliver Goethe making his FIA Formula 3 debut for Campos Racing by replacing Hunter Yeany, who was ruled out for the Budapest round due to a broken wrist sustained at the previous round in Spielberg.

For Charouz Racing System, the then-Euroformula Open Championship runner-up Christian Mansell made his debut in the series by replacing Zdeněk Chovanec, who was competing in the last two rounds for the Czech squad.

== Classification ==
=== Qualifying ===
Alexander Smolyar took his first pole position of the season to become the sixth different polesitter at the sixth weekend and he claimed pole position for the first time after 2020 at the same venue. Smolyar qualified ahead of both rookies Zane Maloney and Oliver Bearman.

| Pos. | No. | Driver | Team | Time/Gap | R1 | R2 |
|---|---|---|---|---|---|---|
| 1 | 11 | Alexander Smolyar | MP Motorsport | 1:32.740 | 12 | 1 |
| 2 | 3 | (Barbados) Zane Maloney | Trident | +0.126 | 11 | 2 |
| 3 | 6 | (United Kingdom) Oliver Bearman | Prema Racing | +0.132 | 10 | 3 |
| 4 | 4 | (Monaco) Arthur Leclerc | Prema Racing | +0.172 | 9 | 4 |
| 5 | 8 | (Switzerland) Grégoire Saucy | ART Grand Prix | +0.201 | 8 | 5 |
| 6 | 12 | (India) Kush Maini | MP Motorsport | +0.204 | 7 | 6 |
| 7 | 5 | (United States) Jak Crawford | Prema Racing | +0.269 | 6 | 7 |
| 8 | 7 | (France) Victor Martins | ART Grand Prix | +0.300 | 5 | 8 |
| 9 | 10 | (Brazil) Caio Collet | MP Motorsport | +0.314 | 4 | 9 |
| 10 | 18 | (France) Isack Hadjar | Hitech Grand Prix | +0.335 | 3 | 10 |
| 11 | 29 | (Argentina) Franco Colapinto | Van Amersfoort Racing | +0.346 | 2 | 11 |
| 12 | 21 | (Monaco) Oliver Goethe (Note: Goethe is a Danish-German driver competing under a Monégasque licence.) | Campos Racing | +0.366 | 1 | 12 |
| 13 | 22 | (Spain) Pepe Martí | Campos Racing | +0.384 | 13 | 13 |
| 14 | 2 | (Czech Republic) Roman Staněk | Trident | +0.453 | 14 | 14 |
| 15 | 1 | (United Kingdom) Jonny Edgar | Trident | +0.464 | 15 | 15 |
| 16 | 20 | (Spain) David Vidales | Campos Racing | +0.477 | 16 | 16 |
| 17 | 30 | (Mexico) Rafael Villagómez | Van Amersfoort Racing | +0.531 | 17 | 17 |
| 18 | 9 | (United States) Juan Manuel Correa | ART Grand Prix | +0.674 | 18 | 18 |
| 19 | 31 | (United Kingdom) Reece Ushijima (Note: Ushijima is a Japanese-American driver competing under a British licence.) | Van Amersfoort Racing | +0.776 | 19 | 19 |
| 20 | 25 | (Finland) William Alatalo | Jenzer Motorsport | +0.970 | 20 | 20 |
| 21 | 17 | (United States) Kaylen Frederick | Hitech Grand Prix | +1.008 | 21 | 21 |
| 22 | 26 | (United Kingdom) Zak O'Sullivan | Carlin | +1.019 | 22 | 22 |
| 23 | 23 | (Israel) Ido Cohen | Jenzer Motorsport | +1.023 | 23 | 23 |
| 24 | 15 | (United Kingdom) Christian Mansell (Note: Mansell is an Australian driver competing under a British licence.) | Charouz Racing System | +1.301 | 24 | 24 |
| 25 | 27 | (United States) Brad Benavides (Note: Benavides is an American-Spanish-Guatemalan driver who competed under a Spanish licence in rounds 1–3 and an American licence in rounds 4–9.) | Carlin | +1.375 | 25 | 25 |
| 26 | 16 | (Italy) Francesco Pizzi | Charouz Racing System | +1.466 | 26 | 26 |
| 27 | 19 | (Malaysia) Nazim Azman | Hitech Grand Prix | +1.489 | 27 | 27 |
| 28 | 28 | (Italy) Enzo Trulli | Carlin | +1.651 | 28 | 28 |
| 29 | 14 | (Hungary) László Tóth | Charouz Racing System | +2.221 | 29 | 29 |
| 30 | 24 | (Italy) Federico Malvestiti | Jenzer Motorsport | +2.940 | 30 | 30 |

=== Sprint race ===
| Pos. | No. | Driver | Team | Laps | Time/Gap | Grid | Pts. |
|---|---|---|---|---|---|---|---|
| 1 | 10 | (Brazil) Caio Collet | MP Motorsport | 18 | 37:34.616 | 4 | 10 (1) |
| 2 | 29 | (Argentina) Franco Colapinto | Van Amersfoort Racing | 18 | +8.789 | 2 | 9 |
| 3 | 12 | (India) Kush Maini | MP Motorsport | 18 | +9.694 | 7 | 8 |
| 4 | 18 | (France) Isack Hadjar | Hitech Grand Prix | 18 | +12.004 | 3 | 7 |
| 5 | 6 | (United Kingdom) Oliver Bearman | Prema Racing | 18 | +13.915 | 10 | 6 |
| 6 | 7 | (France) Victor Martins | ART Grand Prix | 18 | +14.607 | 5 | 5 |
| 7 | 8 | (Switzerland) Grégoire Saucy | ART Grand Prix | 18 | +15.561 | 8 | 4 |
| 8 | 21 | (Monaco) Oliver Goethe | Campos Racing | 18 | +19.682 | 1 | 3 |
| 9 | 2 | (Czech Republic) Roman Staněk | Trident | 18 | +20.082 | 14 | 2 |
| 10 | 3 | (Barbados) Zane Maloney | Trident | 18 | +21.180 | 11 | 1 |
| 11 | 31 | (United Kingdom) Reece Ushijima | Van Amersfoort Racing | 18 | +22.208 | 19 | |
| 12 | 9 | (United States) Juan Manuel Correa | ART Grand Prix | 18 | +22.877 | 18 | |
| 13 | 1 | (United Kingdom) Jonny Edgar | Trident | 18 | +24.797 | 15 | |
| 14 | 22 | (Spain) Pepe Martí | Campos Racing | 18 | +27.122 | 13 | |
| 15 | 11 | Alexander Smolyar | MP Motorsport | 18 | +29.104 | 12 | |
| 16 | 25 | (Finland) William Alatalo | Jenzer Motorsport | 18 | +29.590 | 20 | |
| 17 | 30 | (Mexico) Rafael Villagómez | Van Amersfoort Racing | 18 | +31.696 | 17 | |
| 18 | 26 | (United Kingdom) Zak O'Sullivan | Carlin | 18 | +31.956 | 22 | |
| 19 | 17 | (United States) Kaylen Frederick | Hitech Grand Prix | 18 | +37.123 | 21 | |
| 20 | 5 | (United States) Jak Crawford | Prema Racing | 18 | +38.362 | 6 | |
| 21 | 16 | (Italy) Francesco Pizzi | Charouz Racing System | 18 | +38.718 | 26 | |
| 22 | 15 | (United Kingdom) Christian Mansell | Charouz Racing System | 18 | +39.394 | 24 | |
| 23 | 19 | (Malaysia) Nazim Azman | Hitech Grand Prix | 18 | +40.281 | 27 | |
| 24 | 28 | (Italy) Enzo Trulli | Carlin | 18 | +43.663 | 28 | |
| 25 | 24 | (Italy) Federico Malvestiti | Jenzer Motorsport | 18 | +48.834 | 30 | |
| 26 | 14 | (Hungary) László Tóth | Charouz Racing System | 18 | +49.526 | 29 | |
| 27 | 4 | (Monaco) Arthur Leclerc | Prema Racing | 18 | +52.437 | 9 | |
| DNF | 23 | (Israel) Ido Cohen | Jenzer Motorsport | 6 | Collision damage | 23 | |
| DNF | 27 | (United States) Brad Benavides | Carlin | 4 | Collision | 25 | |
| DNF | 20 | (Spain) David Vidales | Campos Racing | 0 | Accident | 16 | |
Fastest lap set by (Brazil) Caio Collet: 1:50.440 (lap 18)

=== Feature race ===
| Pos. | No. | Driver | Team | Laps | Time/Gap | Grid | Pts. |
|---|---|---|---|---|---|---|---|
| 1 | 11 | Alexander Smolyar | MP Motorsport | 24 | 45:02.423 | 1 | 25 (2) |
| 2 | 3 | (Barbados) Zane Maloney | Trident | 24 | +5.560 | 2 | 18 |
| 3 | 6 | (United Kingdom) Oliver Bearman | Prema Racing | 24 | +5.585 | 3 | 15 |
| 4 | 26 | (United Kingdom) Zak O'Sullivan | Carlin | 24 | +7.316 | 22 | 12 (1) |
| 5 | 5 | (United States) Jak Crawford | Prema Racing | 24 | +8.705 | 6 | 10 |
| 6 | 9 | (United States) Juan Manuel Correa | ART Grand Prix | 24 | +10.059 | 18 | 8 |
| 7 | 12 | (India) Kush Maini | MP Motorsport | 24 | +10.578 | 5 | 6 |
| 8 | 4 | (Monaco) Arthur Leclerc | Prema Racing | 24 | +10.983 | 9^{1} | 4 |
| 9 | 10 | (Brazil) Caio Collet | MP Motorsport | 24 | +19.452 | 8 | 2 |
| 10 | 7 | (France) Victor Martins | ART Grand Prix | 24 | +19.614 | 7 | 1 |
| 11 | 8 | (Switzerland) Grégoire Saucy | ART Grand Prix | 24 | +22.570 | 4 | |
| 12 | 3 | (Czech Republic) Roman Staněk | Trident | 24 | +23.027 | 14 | |
| 13 | 20 | (Spain) David Vidales | Campos Racing | 24 | +32.473 | 16 | |
| 14 | 31 | (United Kingdom) Reece Ushijima | Van Amersfoort Racing | 24 | +35.487 | 19 | |
| 15 | 29 | (Argentina) Franco Colapinto | Van Amersfoort Racing | 24 | +38.020 | 11 | |
| 16 | 25 | (Finland) William Alatalo | Jenzer Motorsport | 24 | +39.532 | 20 | |
| 17 | 23 | (Israel) Ido Cohen | Jenzer Motorsport | 24 | +40.124 | 23 | |
| 18 | 18 | (France) Isack Hadjar | Hitech Grand Prix | 24 | +40.642 | 10 | |
| 19 | 28 | (Italy) Enzo Trulli | Carlin | 24 | +40.978 | 27 | |
| 20 | 17 | (United States) Kaylen Frederick | Hitech Grand Prix | 24 | +41.152 | 21 | |
| 21 | 30 | (Mexico) Rafael Villagómez | Van Amersfoort Racing | 24 | +41.691 | 17 | |
| 22 | 27 | (United States) Brad Benavides | Carlin | 24 | +47.360 | 30^{1} | |
| 23 | 15 | (United Kingdom) Christian Mansell | Charouz Racing System | 24 | +57.609 | 24 | |
| 24 | 1 | (United Kingdom) Jonny Edgar | Trident | 24 | +1:09.334 | 15 | |
| 25 | 24 | (Italy) Federico Malvestiti | Jenzer Motorsport | 24 | +1:10.674 | 29 | |
| 26 | 19 | (Malaysia) Nazim Azman | Hitech Grand Prix | 24 | +1:14.488 | 26 | |
| 27 | 16 | (Italy) Francesco Pizzi | Charouz Racing System | 24 | +1:16.800 | 9 | |
| 28 | 21 | (Monaco) Oliver Goethe | Campos Racing | 24 | +1:27.064 | 12 | |
| 29 | 22 | (Spain) Pepe Martí | Campos Racing | 23 | +1 lap | 13 | |
| DNF | 14 | (Hungary) Lászlo Tóth | Charouz Racing System | 1 | Retired | 28 | |
Fastest lap set by (United Kingdom) Zak O'Sullivan: 1:38.070 (lap 21)

Notes:

- ^1 – Arthur Leclerc and Brad Benavides both received a five-place grid drop due to causing collisions in the Sprint Race with Jak Crawford and Ido Cohen respectively.

== Standings after the event ==
Drivers' Championship standings

| | Pos. | Driver | Points |
|---|---|---|---|
| 1 | 1 | (France) Isack Hadjar | 104 |
| 1 | 2 | (France) Victor Martins | 104 |
| | 3 | (Monaco) Arthur Leclerc | 95 |
| | 4 | (United States) Jak Crawford | 80 |
| 1 | 5 | (United Kingdom) Oliver Bearman | 80 |

Teams' Championship standings

| | Pos. | Team | Points |
|---|---|---|---|
| | 1 | (Italy) Prema Racing | 255 |
| | 2 | (France) ART Grand Prix | 153 |
| 2 | 3 | (Netherlands) MP Motorsport | 146 |
| 1 | 4 | (United Kingdom) Hitech Grand Prix | 131 |
| 1 | 5 | (Italy) Trident | 129 |

- Note: Only the top five positions are included for both sets of standings.

== See also ==
- 2022 Hungarian Grand Prix
- 2022 Budapest Formula 2 round

== Notes ==
| Previous round: 2022 Spielberg Formula 3 round | FIA Formula 3 Championship; 2022 season | Next round: 2022 Spa-Francorchamps Formula 3 round |
| Previous round: 2021 Budapest Formula 3 round | Budapest Formula 3 round | Next round: 2023 Budapest Formula 3 round |
