= 2022 Spa-Francorchamps Formula 3 round =

Motor racing event

(Belgium) 2022 Spa-Francorchamps Formula 3 round
Round details
- Round 7 of 9 in the 2022 FIA Formula 3 Championship.
- Layout of the Circuit de Spa-Francorchamps
- Location: Circuit de Spa-Francorchamps, Stavelot, Belgium
- Course: Permanent racing facility 7.004 km (4.352 mi)

Sprint Race
- Date: 27 August 2022
- Laps: 15
Podium
First	(United Kingdom) Oliver Bearman	Prema Racing
Second	(Czech Republic) Roman Staněk	Trident
Third	Alexander Smolyar	MP Motorsport
Fastest lap
Driver	(United Kingdom) Jonny Edgar	Trident
- Time: 2:07.266 (on lap 11)

Feature Race
- Date: 28 August 2022
- Laps: 18
Pole position
Driver	(Brazil) Caio Collet	MP Motorsport
Time	2:11.289	
Podium
First	(Barbados) Zane Maloney	Trident
Second	(Czech Republic) Roman Staněk	Trident
Third	(United Kingdom) Oliver Bearman	Prema Racing
Fastest lap
Driver	(Barbados) Zane Maloney	Trident
- Time: 2:07.838 (on lap 12)

The 2022 Spa-Francorchamps Formula 3 round was a motor racing event held on 27 and 28 August 2022 at the Circuit de Spa-Francorchamps, Stavelot, Belgium. It was the seventh round of the 2022 FIA Formula 3 Championship, and was held in support of the 2022 Belgian Grand Prix.

== Classification ==
=== Qualifying ===
Caio Collet secured his maiden pole position in the rain-affected qualifying session, with Zane Maloney and, surprisingly, Francesco Pizzi in second and third respectively.

Pos.	No.	Driver	Team	Time/Gap	R1	R2
1	10	(Brazil) Caio Collet	MP Motorsport	2:11.289	12	1
2	3	(Barbados) Zane Maloney	Trident	+0.262	11	2
3	16	(Italy) Francesco Pizzi	Charouz Racing System	+0.699	10	3
4	21	(Monaco) Oliver Goethe (Note: Goethe is a Danish-German driver competing under a Monégasque licence.)	Campos Racing	+0.832	9	4
5	2	(Czech Republic) Roman Staněk	Trident	+0.846	8	5
6	1	(United Kingdom) Jonny Edgar	Trident	+0.846	7	6
7	11	Alexander Smolyar	MP Motorsport	+0.860	6	7
8	6	(United Kingdom) Oliver Bearman	Prema Racing	+0.915	5	8
9	29	(Argentina) Franco Colapinto	Van Amersfoort Racing	+0.946	4	9
10	27	(United States) Brad Benavides (Note: Benavides is an American-Spanish-Guatemalan driver who competed under a Spanish licence in rounds 1–3 and an American licence in rounds 4–9.)	Carlin	+0.962	3	10
11	9	(United States) Juan Manuel Correa	ART Grand Prix	+0.966	2	11
12	26	(United Kingdom) Zak O'Sullivan	Carlin	+1.165	1	12
13	25	(Finland) William Alatalo	Jenzer Motorsport	+1.205	13	13
14	28	(Italy) Enzo Trulli	Carlin	+1.383	14	14
15	12	(India) Kush Maini	MP Motorsport	+1.398	15	15
16	31	(United Kingdom) Reece Ushijima (Note: Ushijima is a Japanese-American driver competing under a British licence.)	Van Amersfoort Racing	+1.427	16	16
17	22	(Spain) Pepe Martí	Campos Racing	+1.437	17	17
18	20	(Spain) David Vidales	Campos Racing	+1.666	18	18
19	8	(Switzerland) Grégoire Saucy	ART Grand Prix	+1.851	19	19
20	4	(Monaco) Arthur Leclerc	Prema Racing	+1.902	20	20
21	23	(Israel) Ido Cohen	Jenzer Motorsport	+2.356	21	21
22	24	(Italy) Federico Malvestiti	Jenzer Motorsport	+2.632	22	22
23	18	(France) Isack Hadjar	Hitech Grand Prix	+2.681	23	23
24	7	(France) Victor Martins	ART Grand Prix	+3.068	24	24
25	15	(United Kingdom) Christian Mansell (Note: Mansell is an Australian driver competing under a British licence.)	Charouz Racing System	+3.096	25	25
26	17	(United States) Kaylen Frederick	Hitech Grand Prix	+3.388	26	26
27	30	(Mexico) Rafael Villagómez	Van Amersfoort Racing	+3.999	27	27
28	14	(Hungary) László Tóth	Charouz Racing System	+4.722	28	28
29	19	(Malaysia) Nazim Azman	Hitech Grand Prix	+4.931	29	29
107% time: 2:20.479 (+9.190)
—	5	(United States) Jak Crawford	Prema Racing	+12.359	30	30

=== Sprint race ===
Pos.	No.	Driver	Team	Laps	Time/Gap	Grid	Pts.
1	6	(United Kingdom) Oliver Bearman	Prema Racing	15	1:07:07.734	5	10
2	2	(Czech Republic) Roman Staněk	Trident	15	+4.762	8	9
3	11	Alexander Smolyar	MP Motorsport	15	+5.689	6	8
4	1	(United Kingdom) Jonny Edgar	Trident	15	+6.339^{1}	7	7 (1)
5	4	(Monaco) Arthur Leclerc	Prema Racing	15	+7.586	20	6
6	25	(Finland) William Alatalo	Jenzer Motorsport	15	+10.609	13	5
7	20	(Spain) David Vidales	Campos Racing	15	+12.294	18	4
8	27	(United States) Brad Benavides	Carlin	15	+12.326	3	3
9	18	(France) Isack Hadjar	Hitech Grand Prix	15	+12.538	23	2
10	10	(Brazil) Caio Collet	MP Motorsport	15	+13.231	12	1
11	5	(United States) Jak Crawford	Prema Racing	15	+14.118	30	
12	8	(Switzerland) Grégoire Saucy	ART Grand Prix	15	+14.266	19	
13	12	(India) Kush Maini	MP Motorsport	15	+14.670	15	
14	31	(United Kingdom) Reece Ushijima	Van Amersfoort Racing	15	+16.969	16	
15	29	(Argentina) Franco Colapinto	Van Amersfoort Racing	15	+17.887	4	
16	19	(Malaysia) Nazim Azman	Hitech Grand Prix	15	+19.147	29	
17	9	(United States) Juan Manuel Correa	ART Grand Prix	15	+20.061	2	
18	24	(Italy) Federico Malvestiti	Jenzer Motorsport	15	+20.876	22	
19	16	(Italy) Francesco Pizzi	Charouz Racing System	15	+21.857	10	
20	26	(United Kingdom) Zak O'Sullivan	Carlin	15	+26.173^{2}	1	
21	7	(France) Victor Martins	ART Grand Prix	15	+27.345	24	
22	14	(Hungary) Lászlo Tóth	Charouz Racing System	15	+28.710	28	
23	30	(Mexico) Rafael Villagómez	Van Amersfoort Racing	15	+32.465	27	
24^{†}	23	(Israel) Ido Cohen	Jenzer Motorsport	13	Retired	21	
DNF	22	(Spain) Pepe Martí	Campos Racing	11	Oil leak	17	
DNF	21	(Monaco) Oliver Goethe	Campos Racing	5	Collision	9	
DNF	3	(Barbados) Zane Maloney	Trident	5	Collision	11	
DNF	15	(United Kingdom) Christian Mansell	Charouz Racing System	1	Accident	25	
DNF	17	(United States) Kaylen Frederick	Hitech Grand Prix	1	Puncture damage	26	
DSQ	28	(Italy) Enzo Trulli	Carlin	15	Disqualified^{3}	14	
Fastest lap set by (United Kingdom) Jonny Edgar: 2:07.266 (lap 11)

Notes:

- ^1 – Jonny Edgar originally finished second, but was given a five-second time-penalty for causing a collision with Franco Colapinto.
- ^2 – Zak O'Sullivan originally finished twenteeth, but was given a five-second time-penalty for causing a collision with Juan Manuel Correa.
- ^3 – Enzo Trulli originally finished sixteenth, but was later disqualified due to unauthorised work that was carried out on his car during the red flag period, specifically alterations to the rear wing whilst the race was suspended, which is a breach of Article 42.4 of the FIA Sporting Regulations.
- ^† – Ido Cohen was classified as he had completed more than 90% of the race distance

=== Feature race ===
Pos.	No.	Driver	Team	Laps	Time/Gap	Grid	Pts.
1	3	(Barbados) Zane Maloney	Trident	18	45:33.153	2	25 (1)
2	2	(Czech Republic) Roman Staněk	Trident	18	+1.046	5	18
3	6	(United Kingdom) Oliver Bearman	Prema Racing	18	+5.684	8	15
4	21	(Monaco) Oliver Goethe	Campos Racing	18	+6.737	4	12
5	1	(United Kingdom) Jonny Edgar	Trident	18	+7.433	6	10
6	10	(Brazil) Caio Collet	MP Motorsport	18	+9.297^{4}	1	8 (2)
7	25	(Finland) William Alatalo	Jenzer Motorsport	18	+10.879	13	6
8^{5}	20	(Spain) David Vidales	Campos Racing	18	+10.831	18	4
9	11	Alexander Smolyar	MP Motorsport	18	+11.665	7	2
10	31	(United Kingdom) Reece Ushijima	Van Amersfoort Racing	18	+13.360	16	1
11	4	(Monaco) Arthur Leclerc	Prema Racing	18	+13.608	20	
12	29	(Argentina) Franco Colapinto	Van Amersfoort Racing	18	+14.855	9	
13	26	(United Kingdom) Zak O'Sullivan	Carlin	18	+15.784	12	
14	18	(France) Isack Hadjar	Hitech Grand Prix	18	+16.423	23	
15	9	(United States) Juan Manuel Correa	ART Grand Prix	18	+16.909	11	
16	17	(United States) Kaylen Frederick	Hitech Grand Prix	18	+17.952	26	
17	5	(United States) Jak Crawford	Prema Racing	18	+18.311	30	
18	27	(United States) Brad Benavides	Carlin	18	+20.101	10	
19	30	(Mexico) Rafael Villagómez	Van Amersfoort Racing	18	+20.610	27	
20	19	(Malaysia) Nazim Azman	Hitech Grand Prix	18	+20.940	29	
21	16	(Italy) Francesco Pizzi	Charouz Racing System	18	+21.568	3	
22	22	(Spain) Pepe Martí	Campos Racing	18	+23.753	17	
23	15	(United Kingdom) Christian Mansell	Charouz Racing System	18	+24.691	25	
24	28	(Italy) Enzo Trulli	Carlin	18	+24.908	14	
25	14	(Hungary) Lászlo Tóth	Charouz Racing System	18	+25.404	28	
26	24	(Italy) Federico Malvestiti	Jenzer Motorsport	18	+1:13.968	22	
DNF	8	(Switzerland) Grégoire Saucy	ART Grand Prix	6	Accident	19	
DNF	23	(Israel) Ido Cohen	Jenzer Motorsport	1	Collision damage	21	
DNF	7	(France) Victor Martins	ART Grand Prix	1	Collision damage	24	
DNF	12	(India) Kush Maini	MP Motorsport	0	Collision damage	15	
Fastest lap set by (Barbados) Zane Maloney: 2:07.838 (lap 12)

Notes:

- ^4 – Caio Collet originally finished third, but was given a five-second time-penalty for rejoining the track unsafely.
- ^5 – David Vidales originally finished seventh, but was later dropped one position for being found to have left the track and gained a lasting advantage whilst overtaking William Alatalo, elevating the latter to seventh place.

== Standings after the event ==
Drivers' Championship standings

	Pos.	Driver	Points
	1	(France) Isack Hadjar	106
3	2	(United Kingdom) Oliver Bearman	105
1	3	(France) Victor Martins	104
1	4	(Monaco) Arthur Leclerc	101
1	5	(Czech Republic) Roman Staněk	96

Teams' Championship standings

	Pos.	Team	Points
	1	(Italy) Prema Racing	286
3	2	(Italy) Trident	200
	3	(Netherlands) MP Motorsport	167
2	4	(France) ART Grand Prix	153
1	5	(United Kingdom) Hitech Grand Prix	133

- Note: Only the top five positions are included for both sets of standings.

== See also ==
- 2022 Belgian Grand Prix
- 2022 Spa-Francorchamps Formula 2 round

== Notes ==
Previous round: 2022 Budapest Formula 3 round	FIA Formula 3 Championship; 2022 season	Next round: 2022 Zandvoort Formula 3 round
Previous round: 2021 Spa-Francorchamps Formula 3 round	Spa-Francorchamps Formula 3 round	Next round: 2023 Spa-Francorchamps Formula 3 round
