= 2022 Spielberg Formula 3 round =

Motor racing event

(Austria) 2022 Spielberg Formula 3 round
Round details
- Round 5 of 9 in the 2022 FIA Formula 3 Championship.
- Location: Red Bull Ring, Spielberg, Austria
- Course: Permanent racing facility 4.318 km (2.683 mi)

Sprint Race
- Date: 9 July 2022
- Laps: 21
Podium
First	(United States) Jak Crawford	Prema Racing
Second	(Brazil) Caio Collet	MP Motorsport
Third	(Argentina) Franco Colapinto	Van Amersfoort Racing
Fastest lap
Driver	(Monaco) Arthur Leclerc	Prema Racing
- Time: 1:21.200 (on lap 7)

Feature Race
- Date: 10 July 2022
- Laps: 26
Pole position
Driver	(France) Isack Hadjar	Hitech Grand Prix
Time	1:19.759	
Podium
First	(France) Isack Hadjar	Hitech Grand Prix
Second	(France) Victor Martins	ART Grand Prix
Third	(United Kingdom) Oliver Bearman	Prema Racing
Fastest lap
Driver	(France) Isack Hadjar	Hitech Grand Prix
- Time: 1:32.041 (on lap 24)

The 2022 Spielberg Formula 3 round was a motor racing event held on 9 and 10 July 2022 at the Red Bull Ring, Spielberg, Austria. It was the fifth round of the 2022 FIA Formula 3 Championship, and was held in support of the 2022 Austrian Grand Prix.

== Driver changes ==
The only driver change took part at MP Motorsport as Alexander Smolyar returned to the grid after being replaced by Euroformula Open driver Filip Ugran in Silverstone due to visa problems, preventing him from entering the United Kingdom.

== Classification ==
=== Qualifying ===
Hitech Grand Prix driver Isack Hadjar achieved his maiden pole position by 0.221 seconds ahead of fellow Frenchman and championship leader Victor Martins, and Oliver Bearman.

Pos.	No.	Driver	Team	Time/Gap	R1	R2
1	18	(France) Isack Hadjar	Hitech Grand Prix	1:19.759	12	1
2	7	(France) Victor Martins	ART Grand Prix	+0.221	11	2
3	6	(United Kingdom) Oliver Bearman	Prema Racing	+0.299	10	3
4	4	(Monaco) Arthur Leclerc	Prema Racing	+0.310	9	4
5	17	(United States) Kaylen Frederick	Hitech Grand Prix	+0.375	8	5
6	2	(Czech Republic) Roman Staněk	Trident	+0.419	7	6
7	1	(United Kingdom) Jonny Edgar	Trident	+0.440	6	7
8	3	(Barbados) Zane Maloney	Trident	+0.531	5	8
9	29	(Argentina) Franco Colapinto	Van Amersfoort Racing	+0.538	4	9
10	5	(United States) Jak Crawford	Prema Racing	+0.592	3	10
11	9	(United States) Juan Manuel Correa	ART Grand Prix	+0.621	2	11
12	10	(Brazil) Caio Collet	MP Motorsport	+0.662	1	12
13	23	(Israel) Ido Cohen	Jenzer Motorsport	+0.672	13	13
14	25	(Finland) William Alatalo	Jenzer Motorsport	+0.674	14	14
15	26	(United Kingdom) Zak O'Sullivan	Carlin	+0.751	15	15
16	11	Alexander Smolyar	MP Motorsport	+0.757	16	16
17	28	(Italy) Enzo Trulli	Carlin	+0.809	17	17
18	8	(Switzerland) Grégoire Saucy	ART Grand Prix	+0.832	18	18
19	20	(Spain) David Vidales	Campos Racing	+0.848	19	19
20	22	(Spain) Pepe Martí	Campos Racing	+0.909	20	20
21	31	(United Kingdom) Reece Ushijima (Note: Ushijima is a Japanese-American driver competing under a British licence.)	Van Amersfoort Racing	+0.988	21	21
22	19	(Malaysia) Nazim Azman	Hitech Grand Prix	+1.023	22	22
23	21	(United States) Hunter Yeany	Campos Racing	+1.100	23	23
24	16	(Italy) Francesco Pizzi	Charouz Racing System	+1.109	24	24
25	30	(Mexico) Rafael Villagómez	Van Amersfoort Racing	+1.168	25	25
26	12	(India) Kush Maini	MP Motorsport	+1.339	26	26
27	27	(United States) Brad Benavides (Note: Benavides is an American-Spanish-Guatemalan driver who competed under a Spanish licence in rounds 1–3 and an American licence in rounds 4–9.)	Carlin	+1.545	27	27
28	24	(Italy) Federico Malvestiti	Jenzer Motorsport	+1.611	28	28
29	14	(Hungary) László Tóth	Charouz Racing System	+2.807	29	29
107% time: 1:25.342 (+5.583)
—	15	(Portugal) Zdeněk Chovanec (Note: Chovanec is a Czech-Venezuelan driver competing under a Portuguese licence.)	Charouz Racing System	+8.136	30^{1}	30^{1}

Notes:

- ^1 – Zdeněk Chovanec was not able to set a time within the 107% time, but was later given permission by the stewards to start both the Sprint Race and the Feature Race from the back of the grid.

=== Sprint Race ===
Pos.	No.	Driver	Team	Laps	Time/Gap	Grid	Pts.
1	5	(United States) Jak Crawford	Prema Racing	21	32:50.011	3	10
2	10	(Brazil) Caio Collet	MP Motorsport	21	+0.626	1	9
3	29	(Argentina) Franco Colapinto	Van Amersfoort Racing	21	+1.020	4	8
4	4	(Monaco) Arthur Leclerc	Prema Racing	21	+1.265	9	7 (1)
5	2	(Czech Republic) Roman Staněk	Trident	21	+2.351	7	6
6	17	(United States) Kaylen Frederick	Hitech Grand Prix	21	+6.178	8	5
7	1	(United Kingdom) Jonny Edgar	Trident	21	+7.207	6	4
8	7	(France) Victor Martins	ART Grand Prix	21	+7.582	11	3
9	11	Alexander Smolyar	MP Motorsport	21	+8.111	16	2
10	18	(France) Isack Hadjar	Hitech Grand Prix	21	+8.568	12	1
11	8	(Switzerland) Grégoire Saucy	ART Grand Prix	21	+8.959	18	
12	26	(United Kingdom) Zak O'Sullivan	Carlin	21	+9.362	15	
13	22	(Spain) Pepe Martí	Campos Racing	21	+9.752	20	
14	23	(Israel) Ido Cohen	Jenzer Motorsport	21	+10.311	13	
15	16	(Italy) Francesco Pizzi	Charouz Racing System	21	+10.585	24	
16	6	(United Kingdom) Oliver Bearman	Prema Racing	21	+10.606^{2}	10	
17	31	(United Kingdom) Reece Ushijima	Van Amersfoort Racing	21	+11.280	21	
18	20	(Spain) David Vidales	Campos Racing	21	+11.637	19	
19	12	(India) Kush Maini	MP Motorsport	21	+12.495	26	
20	27	(United States) Brad Benavides	Carlin	21	+16.133	27	
21	24	(Italy) Federico Malvestiti	Jenzer Motorsport	21	+17.119	28	
22	21	(United States) Hunter Yeany	Campos Racing	21	+19.716	23	
23	14	(Hungary) László Tóth	Charouz Racing System	21	+19.964	29	
24	19	(Malaysia) Nazim Azman	Hitech Grand Prix	21	+21.141	22	
25	28	(Italy) Enzo Trulli	Carlin	21	+50.504	17	
26	15	(Portugal) Zdeněk Chovanec	Charouz Racing System	21	+54.445	30	
DNF	3	(Barbados) Zane Maloney	Trident	9	Collision damage	5	
DNF	25	(Finland) William Alatalo	Jenzer Motorsport	7	Engine failure	14	
DNF	9	(United States) Juan Manuel Correa	ART Grand Prix	5	Mechanical	2	
DNF	30	(Mexico) Rafael Villagómez	Van Amersfoort Racing	0	Collision damage	25	
Fastest lap set by (Monaco) Arthur Leclerc: 1:21.200 (lap 7)

Notes:

- ^2 – Oliver Bearman originally finished sixth, but was given a five-second time-penalty for repeatedly exceeding track limits.

=== Feature race ===
Isack Hadjar took his third victory of the season and his first Feature Race win in Formula 3 to close the gap in the championship to Victor Martins to only one point. However, Martins set a new record for the most podium finishes in F3 with eleven, more than any other driver.

Pos.	No.	Driver	Team	Laps	Time/Gap	Grid	Pts.
1	18	(France) Isack Hadjar	Hitech Grand Prix	25	40:34.535	1	25 (3)
2	7	(France) Victor Martins	ART Grand Prix	25	+3.251	2	18
3	6	(United Kingdom) Oliver Bearman	Prema Racing	25	+4.881	3	15
4	4	(Monaco) Arthur Leclerc	Prema Racing	25	+5.383	4	12
5	3	(Barbados) Zane Maloney	Trident	25	+6.457	8	10
6	29	(Argentina) Franco Colapinto	Van Amersfoort Racing	25	+9.113	9	8
7	11	Alexander Smolyar	MP Motorsport	25	+9.882	16	6
8	25	(Finland) William Alatalo	Jenzer Motorsport	25	+10.852	14	4
9	23	(Israel) Ido Cohen	Jenzer Motorsport	25	+12.286	13	2
10	9	(United States) Juan Manuel Correa	ART Grand Prix	25	+12.706	11	1
11	2	(Czech Republic) Roman Staněk	Trident	25	+13.067^{3}	6	
12	20	(Spain) David Vidales	Campos Racing	25	+13.901	19	
13	31	(United Kingdom) Reece Ushijima	Van Amersfoort Racing	25	+14.095	21	
14	8	(Switzerland) Grégoire Saucy	ART Grand Prix	25	+14.738	18	
15	30	(Italy) Rafael Villagómez	Van Amersfoort Racing	25	+15.442	24	
16	19	(Malaysia) Nazim Azman	Hitech Grand Prix	25	+15.722	22	
17	26	(United Kingdom) Zak O'Sullivan	Carlin	25	+16.765	15	
18	28	(Italy) Enzo Trulli	Carlin	25	+19.446	17	
19	14	(Hungary) László Tóth	Charouz Racing System	25	+21.368	28	
20	27	(United States) Brad Benavides	Carlin	25	+24.273	26	
21	1	(United Kingdom) Jonny Edgar	Trident	25	+50.679	7	
22	5	(United States) Jak Crawford	Prema Racing	25	+1:00.379	10	
23	17	(United States) Kaylen Frederick	Hitech Grand Prix	25	+1:13.566	5	
24	16	(Italy) Francesco Pizzi	Charouz Racing System	24	+1 lap^{4}	23	
25†^{5}	12	(India) Kush Maini	MP Motorsport	23	+2 laps	25	
26	24	(Italy) Federico Malvestiti	Jenzer Motorsport	23	+2 laps	27	
27†^{5}	10	(Brazil) Caio Collet	MP Motorsport	22	+3 laps	12	
DNF	15	(Portugal) Zdeněk Chovanec	Charouz Racing System	18	Collision	29	
DNF	22	(Spain) Pepe Martí	Campos Racing	17	Collision damage	20	
WD	21	(United States) Hunter Yeany	Campos Racing	—	Withdrew^{6}	—	
Fastest lap set by (France) Isack Hadjar: 1:32.041 (lap 24)

Notes:

- ^3 – Roman Staněk originally finished sixth, but was later given a five-second time-penalty for causing a collision with Kaylen Frederick, demoting him to eleventh place and subsequently dropping him out of the points.
- ^4 – Francesco Pizzi received a total time-penalty of twenty seconds for twice causing a collision with teammate Zdeněk Chovanec.
- ^5 – Kush Maini and Caio Collet retired, but were classified as they completed over 90% of the race distance.
- ^6 – Following a medical examination, Hunter Yeany was declared unfit for Sunday's Feature Race due to a broken wrist sustained at the Sprint Race and therefore withdrew from the remainder of the weekend.

== Standings after the event ==
Drivers' Championship standings

	Pos.	Driver	Points
	1	(France) Victor Martins	98
1	2	(France) Isack Hadjar	97
1	3	(Monaco) Arthur Leclerc	91
1	4	(United States) Jak Crawford	70
1	5	(Czech Republic) Roman Staněk	67

Teams' Championship standings

Pos.	Team	Points
1	(Italy) Prema Racing	220
2	(France) ART Grand Prix	135
3	(United Kingdom) Hitech Grand Prix	124
4	(Italy) Trident	108
5	(Netherlands) MP Motorsport	92

- Note: Only the top five positions are included for both sets of standings.

== See also ==
- 2022 Austrian Grand Prix
- 2022 Spielberg Formula 2 round

== Notes ==
Previous round: 2022 Silverstone Formula 3 round	FIA Formula 3 Championship; 2022 season	Next round: 2022 Budapest Formula 3 round
Previous round: 2021 Spielberg Formula 3 round	Spielberg Formula 3 round	Next round: 2023 Spielberg Formula 3 round
