= Enzo Trulli =

Italian racing driver (born 2005)

- Trulli at Silverstone Circuit in 2026.
- Nationality: (Italy) Italian
- Born: 15 April 2005 (age 21) Pescara, Italy
- Relatives: Jarno Trulli (father)

European Le Mans Series career
- Debut season: 2026
- Current team: Algarve Pro Racing
- Categorisation: FIA Silver
- Car number: 20
- Starts: 1
- Wins: 1
- Podiums: 1
- Poles: 0
- Fastest laps: 0
- Best finish: TBD in 2026

Previous series
- 2025 2024 2023 2023 2022 2021, 2023 2021: Porsche Carrera Cup Asia; Italian GT Championship; FR Japanese Championship; Super Formula Lights; FIA Formula 3 Championship; Euroformula Open; Formula 4 UAE Championship

Championship titles
- 2026 2021: ELMS - LMP2 Pro-Am; Formula 4 UAE Championship

Enzo Trulli (born 15 April 2005) is an Italian racing driver who competes in the European Le Mans Series in the LMP2 Pro-Am class with Algarve Pro Racing. He was the 2025 Porsche Carrera Cup Asia runner-up with Toro Racing. Trulli previously won the 2021 Formula 4 UAE Championship, and raced for Carlin in the FIA Formula 3 Championship.

Trulli is the son of Formula One race winner Jarno Trulli.

== Early career ==
=== Karting ===
Trulli starting karting competitively in 2017. He achieved a result of 25th in the 2018 CIK-FIA Karting World Championship in the OK-Junior category. He improved his result to 18th two years later in the senior OK category.

=== Formula 4 ===
At the end of 2020, Trulli tested single-seaters for the first time, partaking in the post-season test in the Italian F4 Championship.

Trulli made his single-seater debut at the start of 2021, partnering Enzo Scionti in the Formula 4 UAE Championship at Cram Durango. He would become embroiled in a close title battle with Dilano van 't Hoff throughout the campaign, winning four races and finishing on the podium a further nine times. A podium in the final race at the Dubai Autodrome meant that Trulli would win the title, a sole point ahead of his Dutch adversary. Trulli was also announced to race in the 2021 F4 Spanish Championship with Drivex School, but he ended up not taking part in the championship.

=== Euroformula Open ===
==== 2021 ====
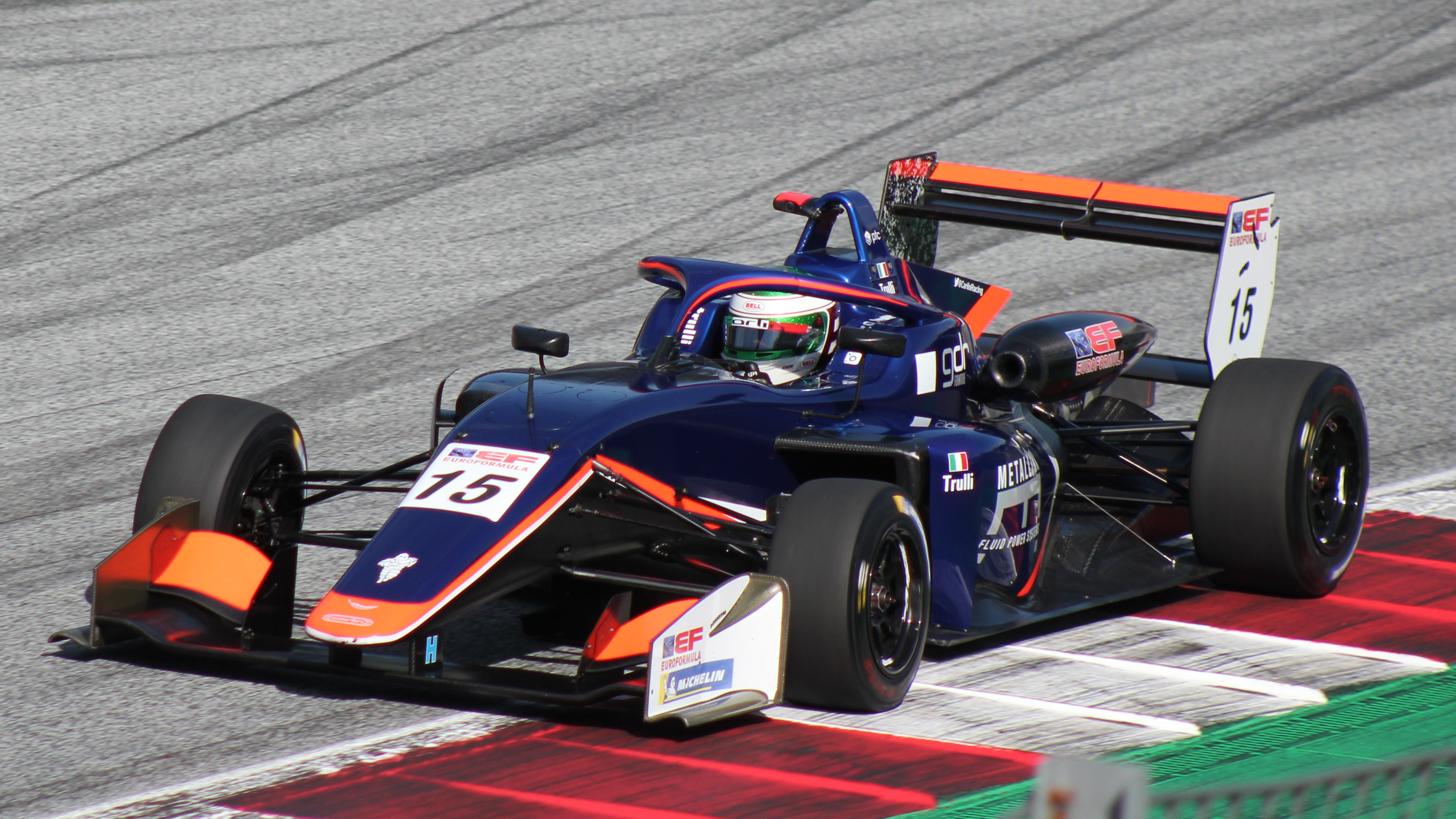
Trulli at the Red Bull Ring in 2021

For his main campaign in 2021, Trulli moved to the Euroformula Open Championship with Drivex School, once again driving alongside Enzo Scionti. He started his season strongly, taking third place in just his third race. Trulli would miss the round at the Hungaroring, but returned the next round with Carlin. Trulli would end the season with three third places in the final four races and end seventh in the standings, the highest placed driver not to win a race.

==== 2023 ====
Trulli made his Euroformula Open return in 2023 with CrypoTower by Motopark for the opening round in Portimão. His cameo appearance started strongly, taking his first Euroformula open pole and win during the first race. He returned for the final round in Barcelona, winning the first race. Trulli ended the championship in tenth place.

=== FIA Formula 3 ===
Having "[worked] really hard to do Euroformula" before the 2022 season, Trulli progressed into the FIA Formula 3 Championship at the last minute, partnering Zak O'Sullivan and Brad Benavides at Carlin. Trulli was set for his best finish of the season in Spa-Francorchamps sprint race with 16th place, but was disqualified due to a red flag infringement. He finished the championship 34th, and had a best finish of 17th twice. He was also outpaced by teammates Zak O'Sullivan and Brad Benavides, who managed to score points. Trulli did not return to Formula 3 the following season.

=== Super Formula Lights ===
After being left without a Formula 3 drive, Trulli switched to racing in Asia, partaking in the Super Formula Lights during the 2023 season with TOM'S. He then stated that he "[felt] more suited to Super Formula Lights than FIA F3". The first three rounds would bring mediocre results, scoring just one podium. However during the round in Fuji Speedway, Trulli would win all three races, although a disqualification in the second race would prevent a clean sweep. He placed fifth place in the standings, with 44 points.

=== Formula Regional Japanese Championship ===
Trulli made his debut in Formula Regional during the 2023 Formula Regional Japanese Championship with TOM'S Formula in Motegi, finishing all three races on the podium. In the end, he placed tenth in the standings.

== Sportscar career ==
=== 2024: Italian GT ===
After failing to find a spot in Super Formula, Trulli pivoted to the 2024 Italian GT Championship with Easy Race.

=== 2025: Porsche Carrera Cup Asia ===
Trulli moved to the Porsche Carrera Cup Asia for 2025 with Toro Racing.

At the end of the year, Trulli competed in the Asian Le Mans Series with Algarve Pro Racing in the LMP2 category. He was also picked as Porsche Motorsport Asia Pacific's selected driver, succeeding Dorian Boccolacci.

=== 2026: ELMS debut ===
Alongside his concurrent Asian Le Mans Series campaign, Trulli raced in the second and third rounds of the 24H Series Middle East with Earl Bamber Motorsport.

For his main campaign. Trulli embarked in the European Le Mans Series with Algarve Pro Racing in the LMP2 Pro-Am category.

== Karting record ==
=== Karting career summary ===
Season	Series	Team	Position
2016	ROK Cup Italy Area Nord - Mini ROK		16th
2016	Italian Cup - 60 Mini	Jarno Trulli	DNF
2017	Andrea Margutti Trophy - 60 Mini		31st
2017	Italian Championship - 60 Mini		17th
2017	22° South Garda Winter Cup - Mini ROK		20th
2017	ROK Cup Italy - Mini ROK	Jarno Trulli	16th
2017	ROK Cup International Final - Mini ROK		21st
2017	WSK Super Master Series - 60 Mini		27th
2018	Italian Championship - X30 Junior		15th
2018	CIK-FIA European Karting Championship — OKJ	CRG SpA	23rd
2018	Andrea Margutti Trophy - OK Junior	CRG Spa	1st
2018	CIK-FIA Karting World Championship - Junior	CRG Spa	25th
2018	German Junior Kart Championship - OK-Junior	CRG Holland	10th
2018	23° South Garda Winter Cup - OKJ	CRG Spa	24th
2019	Italian Championship - X30 Junior		7th
2019	48° Trofeo delle Industrie - OK	Team Driver Racing Kart	6th
2019	CIK-FIA European Karting Championship - OKJ	CRG	54th
2019	CIK-FIA Karting World Championship - OKJ	KR Motorsport	
2019	WSK Euro Series - OKJ	CRG Spa	46th
2019	WSK Champions Cup - OK Junior	CRG Keijzer Racing	29th
2019	WSK Super Master Series - OK Junior	CRG Keijzer Racing	24th
2019	24° South Garda Winter Cup - OKJ	CRG Holland	20th
2020	CIK-FIA Karting World Championship - OK	Birel ART Racing Srl	18th
2020	WSK Euro Series - OK		23rd
2020	CIK-FIA European Karting Championship - OK	KR Motorsport Srl	15th
2020	WSK Super Master Series - OK	KR Motorsport	13th

== Racing record ==
=== Racing career summary ===
Season	Series	Team	Races	Wins	Poles	F/Laps	Podiums	Points	Position
2021	Formula 4 UAE Championship	Cram Durango	19	4	0	5	13	319	**1st**
2021	Euroformula Open Championship	Drivex School	9	0	0	0	1	144	7th
2021	Euroformula Open Championship	Carlin Motorsport	12	0	0	1	3	144	7th
2022	FIA Formula 3 Championship	Carlin	18	0	0	0	0	0	34th
2023	Euroformula Open Championship	CryptoTower Racing Team	6	2	2	0	3	98	10th
2023	Super Formula Lights	TOM'S	18	2	1	1	3	44	5th
2023	Formula Regional Japanese Championship	TOM'S Formula	6	0	1	0	3	51	10th
2024	Italian GT Sprint Championship - GT3 Pro-Am	Easy Race	5	0	1	2	1	38	6th
2025	Porsche Carrera Cup Asia	Toro Racing	14	1	1	0	6	215	**2nd**
2025-26	Asian Le Mans Series - LMP2	Algarve Pro Racing	6	0	0	1	3	74	**3rd**
2025-26	24H Series Middle East - GT3	EBM	2	0	0	0	0	0	18th
2026	European Le Mans Series - LMP2 Pro-Am	Algarve Pro Racing	6	2	0	0	4	86	**1st**
2026	24 Hours of Le Mans - LMP2 Pro-Am	Algarve Pro Racing	1	0	0	0	0	N/A	4th
2026	China GT Championship - GT3	Phantom Global Racing	7	0	0	0	2	59*	6th*
2026	China GT Championship - GTS	Maxmore W&S Motorsport	3	0	0	0	2	33*	13th*
2026	GT World Challenge Europe Endurance Cup	Pure Rxcing	1	0	0	0	0	0	NC
2026	GT World Challenge Asia	EBM	2	0	0	0	0	0	NC
2026	Nürburgring Langstrecken-Serie - SP7	Four Motors Bioconcept-Car	1	0	0	0	0	0	NC
2026	Shanghai 8 Hours	Origine Motorsport	1	0	0	0	0	N/A	DNF
2026	TSS The Super Series - GT3	B-Quik Absolute Racing	2	0	1	0	0	22*	9th*
2026-27	Asian Le Mans Series - LMP2	Algarve Pro Racing							

^{*} Season still in progress.

=== Complete F4 UAE Championship results ===
(key) (Races in bold indicate pole position) (Races in italics indicate fastest lap)

Year	Team	1	2	3	4	5	6	7	8	9	10	11	12	13	14	15	16	17	18	19	20	Pos	Points
2021	Cram Durango	DUB1; 1; 1	DUB1; 2; 6	DUB1; 3; 8	DUB1; 4; 2	YMC1; 1; 1	YMC1; 2; 2	YMC1; 3; 2	YMC1; 4; 4	DUB2; 1; 2	DUB2; 2; 1	DUB2; 3; 2	DUB2; 4; 4	YMC2; 1; 1	YMC2; 2; 2	YMC2; 3; 3	YMC2; 4; 5	DUB3; 1; 2	DUB3; 2 DNS	DUB3; 3; 4	DUB3; 4; 3	1st	319

=== Complete Euroformula Open Championship results ===
(key) (Races in bold indicate pole position; races in italics indicate points for the fastest lap of top ten finishers)

Year	Entrant	1	2	3	4	5	6	7	8	9	10	11	12	13	14	15	16	17	18	19	20	21	22	23	24	DC	Points
2021	Drivex School	POR; 1; 6	POR; 2; 4	POR; 3; 3	LEC; 1; 7	LEC; 2; 5	LEC; 3; 5	SPA; 1; 6	SPA; 2; 8	SPA; 3; 7	HUN; 1 WD	HUN; 2 WD	HUN; 3 WD													7th	144
2021	Carlin Motorsport													IMO; 1; 8	IMO; 2; 12	IMO; 3 Ret	RBR; 1; 9	RBR; 2 Ret	RBR; 3; 10	MNZ; 1; 13	MNZ; 2; 13	MNZ; 3; 3	CAT; 1; 3	CAT; 2; 3	CAT; 3; 6	7th	144
2023	CryptoTower by Motopark	**PRT**; **1**; 1	PRT; 2; 2	PRT; 3; 8	SPA; 1	SPA; 2	SPA; 3	HUN; 1	HUN; 2	HUN; 3	LEC; 1	LEC; 2	LEC; 3	RBR; 1	RBR; 2	RBR; 3	MNZ; 1	MNZ; 2	MNZ; 3	MUG; 1	MUG; 2	**CAT**; **1**; 1	CAT; 2; 6	CAT; 3; 4		10th	98

=== Complete FIA Formula 3 Championship results ===
(key) (Races in bold indicate pole position; races in italics indicate points for the fastest lap of top ten finishers)

Year	Entrant	1	2	3	4	5	6	7	8	9	10	11	12	13	14	15	16	17	18	DC	Points
2022	Carlin	BHR; SPR; 20	BHR; FEA; 26	IMO; SPR; 22	IMO; FEA; 24	CAT; SPR; 22	CAT; FEA; 24	SIL; SPR; 27	SIL; FEA; 17	RBR; SPR; 25	RBR; FEA; 18	HUN; SPR; 24	HUN; FEA; 19	SPA; SPR; DSQ	SPA; FEA; 24	ZAN; SPR; 23	ZAN; FEA; 17	MNZ; SPR; 20	MNZ; FEA; 22	34th	0

=== Complete Super Formula Lights results ===
(key) (Races in bold indicate pole position) (Races in italics indicate fastest lap)

Year	Entrant	1	2	3	4	5	6	7	8	9	10	11	12	13	14	15	16	17	18	Pos	Points
2023	TOM'S	AUT; 1; 7	AUT; 2; 7	AUT; 3; 6	SUG; 1; 5	SUG; 2; 4	SUG; 3; 2	SUZ; 1; 5	SUZ; 2; 7	SUZ; 3; 4	**FUJ**; **1**; 1	FUJ; 2 DSQ	FUJ; 3; 1	OKA; 1; 7	OKA; 2 Ret	OKA; 3; 5	MOT; 1; 8	MOT; 2; 6	MOT; 3; 6	5th	44

=== Complete Formula Regional Japanese Championship results ===
(key) (Races in bold indicate pole position) (Races in italics indicate fastest lap)

Year	Entrant	1	2	3	4	5	6	7	8	9	10	11	12	13	14	15	16	Pos	Points
2023	TOM'S Formula	FUJ1; 1	FUJ1; 2	FUJ1; 3	SUZ; 1	SUZ; 2	OKA; 1	OKA; 2	OKA; 3	MOT; 1; 2	MOT; 2; 2	MOT; 3; 3	FUJ2; 1	FUJ2; 2	**SUG**; **1** Ret	SUG; 2 DNS	SUG; 3 Ret	10th	51

=== Complete Porsche Carrera Cup Asia results ===
(key) (Races in bold indicate pole position; races in italics indicate points for the fastest lap of top ten finishers)

Year	Entrant	Class	Chassis	1	2	3	4	5	6	7	8	9	10	11	12	13	14	DC	Points
2025	Toro Racing	Pro	911 GT3 Cup	**SIC**; **1**; 1	SIC; 2 Ret	MOT; 1; 4	MOT; 2; 4	SEP; 1; 10	SEP; 2; 3	SEP; 3; 2	BAN; 1; 6	BAN; 2; 3	MAN; 1; 2	MAN; 2; 2	MAN; 3A; Ret	MRN; 1; 4	MRN; 2; 5	2nd	215

=== Complete Asian Le Mans Series results ===
(key) (Races in bold indicate pole position) (Races in italics indicate fastest lap)

Year	Team	Class	Car	Engine	1	2	3	4	5	6	Pos.	Points
2025–26	Algarve Pro Racing	LMP2	Oreca 07	Gibson GK428 4.2 L V8	SEP; 1; 2	SEP; 2; 2	DUB; 1; 5	DUB; 2; 2	ABU; 1; 5	ABU; 2 Ret	3rd	74

=== Complete European Le Mans Series results ===
(key) (Races in bold indicate pole position; results in italics indicate fastest lap)

Year	Entrant	Class	Chassis	Engine	1	2	3	4	5	6	Rank	Points
2026	Algarve Pro Racing	LMP2 Pro-Am	Oreca 07	Gibson GK428 4.2 L V8	CAT; 1	LEC; 11	IMO; 2	SPA; 2	SIL; 11	ALG; 1	1st	86

=== Complete 24 Hours of Le Mans results ===
Year	Team	Co-Drivers	Car	Class	Laps	Pos.	Class Pos.
2026	(Portugal) Algarve Pro Racing	(United Kingdom) Jake Hughes (Denmark) Michael Jensen	Oreca 07-Gibson	LMP2	356	26th	12th
2026	(Portugal) Algarve Pro Racing	(United Kingdom) Jake Hughes (Denmark) Michael Jensen	Oreca 07-Gibson	LMP2 Pro-Am	356	26th	4th

Sporting positions
Preceded by Francesco Pizzi	Formula 4 UAE Championship; Champion; 2021	Succeeded by Charlie Wurz
