= Francesco Pizzi =

Italian racing driver

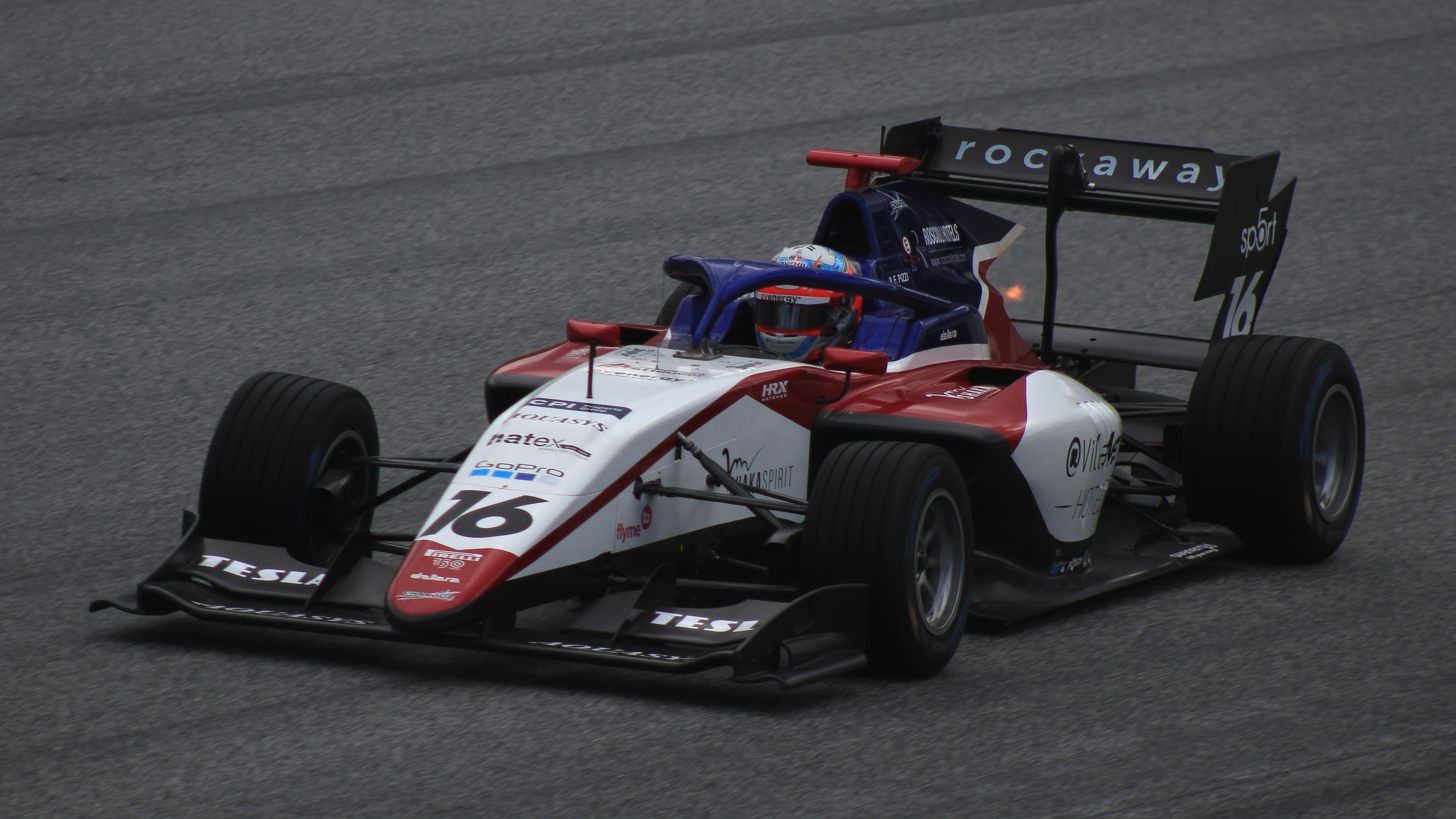
- Pizzi driving the Dallara F3 2019 during the 2022 Spielberg Formula 3 round.
- Nationality: (Italy) Italian
- Born: Francesco Raffaele Pizzi; 12 November 2004 (age 21) Rome, Italy

USF Pro 2000 Championship career
- Debut season: 2023 USF Pro 2000 Championship
- Current team: TJ Speed Motorsports
- Categorisation: FIA Silver
- Car number: 27
- Starts: 19
- Wins: 0
- Podiums: 1
- Poles: 1
- Fastest laps: 2
- Best finish: 5th in 2023

Previous series
- 2023 2022 2021 2020 2020: Indy NXT; FIA Formula 3 FR European; Italian F4; Formula 4 UAE

Championship titles
- 2023 2020: 24 Hours of Daytona LMP2 class Formula 4 UAE Championship

Francesco Raffaele Pizzi (Italian pronunciation: [franˈt͡ʃe.sko raf.faˈɛ.le ˈpit.t͡si]; born 12 November 2004) is an Italian racing driver who last raced in the 2024 USF Pro 2000 Championship with TJ Speed Motorsports.

He was the runner-up of the 2020 Italian F4 Championship behind Gabriele Mini and raced in the 2022 FIA Formula 3 Championship for Charouz Racing System. Pizzi is also the third youngest class winner of the 24 Hours of Daytona, winning in the LMP2 class with team Proton Competition in 2023.

== Career ==
=== Karting ===
In 2013, at the age of eight, Pizzi claimed his maiden win in the rain in race 2 in Lonato of the Formula 60 Italian championship. Pizzi made his international karting debut in the Mini ROK International Final in 2014, where he finished ninth. He raced in the 60 Mini class for three years, winning the South Garda Winter Cup in 2016 and becoming vice-champion in the WSK Super Master Series and WSK Champions Cup respectively that same year. He then moved up to drive in the OKJ-category, placing third in the Italian Championship in 2017. He competed in karts until 2019.

=== Lower formulae ===
In January 2020, Pizzi made his single-seater debut with Xcel Motorsport in the Formula 4 UAE Championship. He had a perfect opening round, winning all three races at the first weekend in Dubai. He scored five more victories and won the championship, 26 points ahead of his nearest competitor Lorenzo Fluxá.

Pizzi then signed with Van Amersfoort Racing to compete in the Italian F4 Championship, as the team's sole full-time entrant. He started the campaign strongly, taking three podiums, including a win, at the first round in Misano, however, his next win would only come at the fifth round in Monza. Despite two wins at that weekend, Pizzi had already lost too much ground to his title rival Gabriele Minì, and in the end finished second, with seven podiums and 208 points to his name.

=== Formula Regional European Championship ===
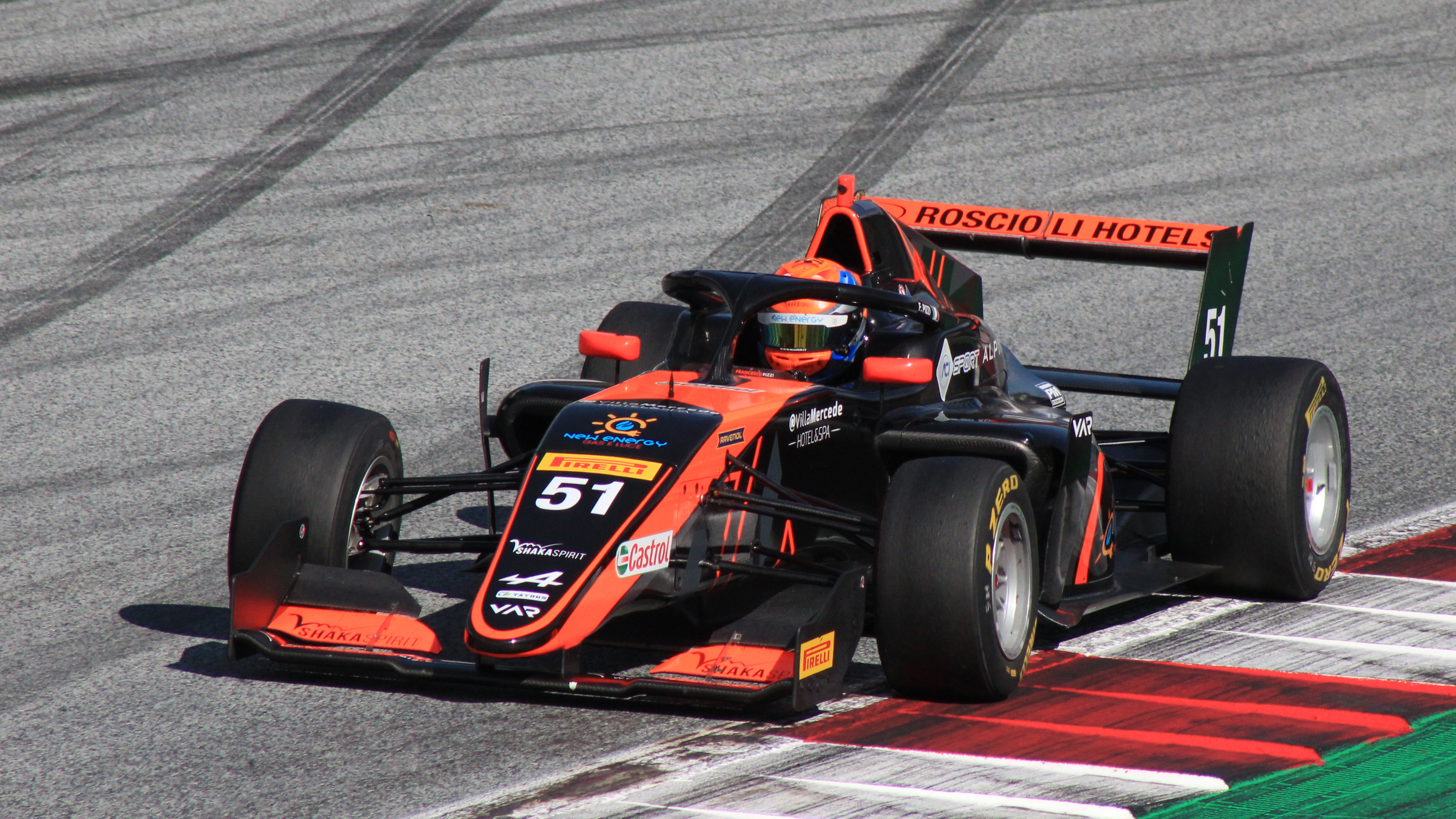
Pizzi racing in the 2021 Formula Regional European Championship at the Red Bull Ring

In December 2020, Pizzi took part in the post-season rookie test for the Formula Regional European Championship for ART Grand Prix alongside his F4 title rival Gabriele Minì and Grégoire Saucy. After a second test later that month, where Pizzi returned to Van Amersfoort Racing and set the third-fastest laptime of the day, the Dutch team confirmed Pizzi to be one of their drivers for the 2021 season. He scored his first points of the season at the Circuit Zandvoort, finishing fifth in the second race. Another points finish at the Red Bull Ring helped Pizzi to finish twentieth in the standings. Following the conclusion of the season, Pizzi announced his departure from VAR and took part in winter testing with Arden in Barcelona, R-ace GP in Paul Ricard and Monza, MP Motorsport in the second Barcelona test and FA Racing in Mugello.

=== FIA Formula 3 Championship ===
For 2022, Pizzi progressed to the FIA Formula 3 Championship, partnering László Tóth and Ayrton Simmons at Charouz Racing System. Talking about his sudden move to F3 after just two years of car racing, Pizzi stated that "it's going to be tough, but that's why we race". Pizzi scored his first and only points of the year, having finished in tenth place during the Imola sprint race. In Spa-Francorchamps, Pizzi qualified an astonishing third. During the feature race, Pizzi was pushed wide at the side, and later Kush Maini spun him round which dropped him to the back and left Pizzi to finish 21st. Overall, Pizzi was the only driver in Charouz to score a point for the team that year, having scored his only top-ten finish at Imola, having finished 27th in the standings, the last placed driver to have scored points.

At the end of the 2022 season, Pizzi partook in the post-season testing with Campos Racing during the first and last day, respectively.

=== USF Pro Championship ===
==== 2023 ====
At the end of October 2022, Pizzi took part in a USF Pro 2000 Championship test at the Indianapolis Motor Speedway with Jay Howard Driver Development. At the start of January the following year, Pizzi confirmed that he would leave Formula 3 and join the 2023 USF Pro 2000 Championship with TJ Speed Motorsports. He debuted in St. Petersburg, claiming two front-row starts, a pole position and a fastest lap on his first time driving the tricky street circuit; he couldn't finish on the podium in any of the races, claiming a fourth and a fifth place. He went on to qualify in the top three again in Sebring, earning his first podium in race 1, and after a chaotic race 2, he managed to scramble to a seventh-place finish. The Indianapolis Motor Speedway weekend was led by controversy after race direction called out a red flag in race 1 for track conditions when the Italian and championship contender Myles Rowe were setting the fastest lap of the race. This forced everyone to put rain tyres on a dry track, and he dropped back to eleventh. More controversy would lead into race 2 after Pizzi took the lead on lap 1 and led until lap 5, at the end of a FCY procedure he waited to pick the pace back up and the race direction in a for sure debatable situation threw the green causing him and the current top-five to drop back to around tenth place, he still managed to recover to seventh before the checkered. He later went on to finish in fourth on his debut oval race and grabbed another top-five finish in Road America at the halfway mark of the championship, earning him second place in the standings despite an underachieving start.

==== 2024 ====
Pizzi returned in a cameo appearance with TJ Speed Motorsports at the Lucas Oil Indianapolis Raceway Park, deputising for Hunter Yeany who was hit with budget issues.

=== Indy NXT by Firestone ===
In the coverage from Peacock on the eighth round of the 2023 Indy NXT at Iowa Speedway, it was rumoured that Pizzi would join Abel Motorsports at Nashville, but neither the team nor the driver had confirmed it by then.

=== Endurance racing ===
Pizzi made his endurance racing debut at the 2023 24 Hours of Daytona, teaming up with Proton Competition in the LMP2 category. He ended up winning the race by sixteen thousandths of a second on his debut, becoming the third youngest ever class winner in the race. The win came after an impressive comeback from him and his teammates after qualifying in last following a wreck, they were able to claim the race lead after a quarter of the race had been gone but found themselves three laps down with four hours to go, thanks to FCY procedures they made it back to the lead lap with Pizzi on the car who then left the car in the hand of his teammate James Allen for the last hour.

== Karting record ==
=== Karting career summary ===
Season	Series	Team	Position
2014	Mini ROK International Final — Bridgestone Final		9th
2014	Andrea Margutti Trophy — 60 Mini		19th
2014	WSK Final Cup — 60 Mini	Lenzokart	31st
2015	WSK Champions Cup — 60 Mini	Lenzokart	15th
2015	Andrea Margutti Trophy — 60 Mini		13th
2015	Italian Championship — 60 Mini		15th
2015	Trofeo delle Industrie — 60 Mini		12th
2015	WSK Night Edition — 60 Mini	Noviello Engine	25th
2015	ROK Cup International Final — Mini ROK		7th
2015	WSK Super Master Series — 60 Mini	Novalux Srl	14th
2015	WSK Final Cup — 60 Mini	Giugliano Kart	9th
2016	South Garda Winter Cup — Mini ROK	Energy Corse	1st
2016	WSK Champions Cup — 60 Mini	Giugliano Kart	2nd
2016	WSK Super Master Series — 60 Mini	Giugliano Kart	2nd
2016	Andrea Margutti Trophy — 60 Mini		16th
2016	Italian Championship — 60 Mini		19th
2016	Trofeo delle Industrie — 60 Mini		10th
2016	WSK Night Edition — 60 Mini	AB Motorsport	11th
2016	ROK Cup International Final — Mini ROK	Baby Race Srl	17th
2016	WSK Final Cup — 60 Mini	Birel ART Racing	33rd
2017	WSK Champions Cup — OKJ	Novalux Srl	10th
2017	Italian Championship — OKJ	Lenzokart	3rd
2017	South Garda Winter Cup — OKJ		21st
2017	CIK-FIA European Championship — OKJ	Novalux Srl	29th
2017	ROK Cup International Final — Junior ROK	Fusion Motorsport	4th
2017	CIK-FIA World Championship — OKJ	Fusion Motorsport	26th
2017	WSK Final Cup — OKJ	Fusion Motorsport	10th
2018	WSK Champions Cup — OKJ	Birel ART Racing	5th
2018	South Garda Winter Cup — OKJ	Birel ART Racing	5th
2018	WSK Super Master Series — OKJ	Birel ART Racing	28th
2018	German Karting Championship — OKJ	Birel ART Racing	26th
2018	CIK-FIA European Championship — OKJ	Lennox Racing Team	62nd
2018	WSK Final Cup — OK	Lennox Racing Team	42nd
2019	South Garda Winter Cup — KZ2	Manetti Motorsport	DNF
2019	Andrea Margutti Trophy — KZ2	Manetti Motorsport	DNF
2019	WSK Euro Series — OK	Manetti Motorsport	33rd
2019	WSK Euro Series — KZ2	Manetti Motorsport	NC
2019	WSK Super Master Series — KZ2	Manetti Motorsport	37th

=== Complete Karting World Championship results ===
Year	Team	Car	Quali Heats	Main race
2017	(United Kingdom) Fusion Motorsport	OKJ	24th	26th

== Racing record ==
=== Racing career summary ===
Season	Series	Team	Races	Wins	Poles	F/Laps	Podiums	Points	Position
2020	Formula 4 UAE Championship	Xcel Motorsport	19	8	3	5	10	300	**1st**
2020	Italian F4 Championship	Van Amersfoort Racing	20	3	1	2	7	208	**2nd**
2020	ADAC Formula 4 Championship	Van Amersfoort Racing	9	0	0	0	0	54	11th
2021	Formula Regional European Championship	Van Amersfoort Racing	20	0	0	0	0	12	20th
2022	FIA Formula 3 Championship	Charouz Racing System	18	0	0	0	0	1	27th
2023	USF Pro 2000 Championship	TJ Speed Motorsports	18	0	1	2	1	259	5th
2023	IMSA SportsCar Championship - LMP2	Proton Competition	1	1	0	0	1	0	NC
2023	Indy NXT	Abel Motorsports	4	0	0	0	0	55	24th
2024	USF Pro 2000 Championship	TJ Speed Motorsports	1	0	0	0	0	5	32nd

=== Complete Formula 4 UAE Championship results ===
(key) (Races in bold indicate pole position; races in italics indicate fastest lap)

Year	Team	1	2	3	4	5	6	7	8	9	10	11	12	13	14	15	16	17	18	19	20	DC	Points
2020	Xcel Motorsport	DUB1; 1; 1	DUB1; 2; 1	DUB1; 3; 1	DUB1; 4 C	YMC1; 1; 1	YMC1; 2; 4	YMC1; 3; 1	YMC1; 4; 11†	YMC2; 1 Ret	YMC2; 2; 5	YMC2; 3; 2	YMC2; 4; 1	**DUB2**; **1**; 4	DUB2; 2; 1	**DUB2**; **3**; 1	DUB2; 4; 6	DUB3; 1; 4	DUB3; 2; 5	**DUB3**; **3**; 2	DUB3; 4 Ret	1st	300

=== Complete Italian F4 Championship results ===
(key) (Races in bold indicate pole position) (Races in italics indicate fastest lap)

Year	Team	1	2	3	4	5	6	7	8	9	10	11	12	13	14	15	16	17	18	19	20	21	Pos	Points
2020	Van Amersfoort Racing	MIS; 1; 2	MIS; 2; 3	MIS; 3; 1	IMO1; 1; 6	IMO1; 2; 10	IMO1; 3; 2	RBR; 1; 6	RBR; 2; 8	RBR; 3; 6	MUG; 1; 9	MUG; 2 Ret	MUG; 3; 5	**MNZ**; **1**; 1	MNZ; 2; 1	MNZ; 3; 4	IMO2; 1; 9	IMO2; 2; 25†	IMO2; 3; 5	VLL; 1; 2	VLL; 2 C	VLL; 3 Ret	2nd	208

=== Complete ADAC Formula 4 Championship results ===
(key) (Races in bold indicate pole position) (Races in italics indicate fastest lap)

Year	Team	1	2	3	4	5	6	7	8	9	10	11	12	13	14	15	16	17	18	19	20	21	Pos	Points
2020	Van Amersfoort Racing	LAU1; 1	LAU1; 2	LAU1; 3	NÜR1; 1; 5	NÜR1; 2; 14	NÜR1; 3; 9	HOC; 1; 5	HOC; 2; 7	HOC; 3; 6	NÜR2; 1; 5	NÜR2; 2; 6	NÜR2; 3 Ret	RBR; 1	RBR; 2	RBR; 3	LAU2; 1	LAU2; 2	LAU2; 3	OSC; 1	OSC; 2	OSC; 3	11th	54

=== Complete Formula Regional European Championship results ===
(key) (Races in bold indicate pole position) (Races in italics indicate fastest lap)

Year	Team	1	2	3	4	5	6	7	8	9	10	11	12	13	14	15	16	17	18	19	20	DC	Points
2021	Van Amersfoort Racing	IMO; 1; 18	IMO; 2; 17	CAT; 1; 21	CAT; 2; 15	MCO; 1; 15	MCO; 2; 12	LEC; 1; 20	LEC; 2; 32†	ZAN; 1; 13	ZAN; 2; 5	SPA; 1; 13	SPA; 2; 16	RBR; 1; 22	RBR; 2; 9	VAL; 1; 18	VAL; 2; 16	MUG; 1; 18	MUG; 2; 17	MNZ; 1; 12	MNZ; 2; 16	20th	12

^{†} Driver did not finish the race, but was classified as they completed more than 90% of the race distance.

=== Complete FIA Formula 3 Championship results ===
(key) (Races in bold indicate pole position) (Races in italics indicate fastest lap)

Year	Team	1	2	3	4	5	6	7	8	9	10	11	12	13	14	15	16	17	18	DC	Points
2022	Charouz Racing System	BHR; SPR; 19	BHR; FEA; Ret	IMO; SPR; 10	IMO; FEA; Ret	CAT; SPR; 24	CAT; FEA; 17	SIL; SPR; 24	SIL; FEA; 14	RBR; SPR; 15	RBR; FEA; 24	HUN; SPR; 21	HUN; FEA; 27	SPA; SPR; 19	SPA; FEA; 21	ZAN; SPR; 16	ZAN; FEA; 18	MNZ; SPR; 17	MNZ; FEA; 16	27th	1

=== Complete IMSA SportsCar Championship results ===
(key) (Races in bold indicate pole position; results in italics indicate fastest lap)

Year	Team	Class	Make	Engine	1	2	3	4	5	6	7	Pos.	Points
2023	Proton Competition	LMP2	Oreca 07	Gibson GK428 V8	DAY; 1†	SEB	LGS	WGL	ELK	IMS	PET	NC†	0†

^{†} Points only counted towards the Michelin Endurance Cup, and not the overall LMP2 Championship.

=== American open-wheel racing results ===
==== USF Pro 2000 Championship ====
(key) (Races in bold indicate pole position) (Races in italics indicate fastest lap) (Races with * indicate most race laps led)

Year	Team	1	2	3	4	5	6	7	8	9	10	11	12	13	14	15	16	17	18	Rank	Points
2023	TJ Speed Motorsports	STP; 1; 4	**STP**; **2**; 5	SEB; 1; 3	SEB; 2; 7	IMS; 1; 10	IMS; 2; 7	IRP; 4	ROA; 1; 6	ROA; 2; 5	MOH; 1; 15	MOH; 2; 17	TOR; 1; 6	TOR; 2; 6	COTA; 1; 16	COTA; 1; 9	POR; 1; 6	POR; 2; 10	POR; 3; 6	5th	259
2024	TJ Speed Motorsports	STP; 1	STP; 2	LOU; 1	LOU; 2	LOU; 3	IMS; 1	IMS; 2	IMS; 3	IRP; 18	ROA; 1	ROA; 2	ROA; 3	MOH; 1	MOH; 2	TOR; 1	TOR; 2	POR; 1	POR; 2	32nd	5

==== Indy NXT ====
Year	Team	1	2	3	4	5	6	7	8	9	10	11	12	13	14	Rank	Points
2023	Abel Motorsports	STP	BAR	IMS	DET	DET	RDA	MOH	IOW	NSH; 19	IMS; 16	GMP	POR	LAG; 12	LAG; 18	24th	55

Sporting positions
Preceded by Matteo Nannini	Formula 4 UAE Championship; Champion; 2020	Succeeded by Enzo Trulli
