= David Vidales =

Spanish racing driver

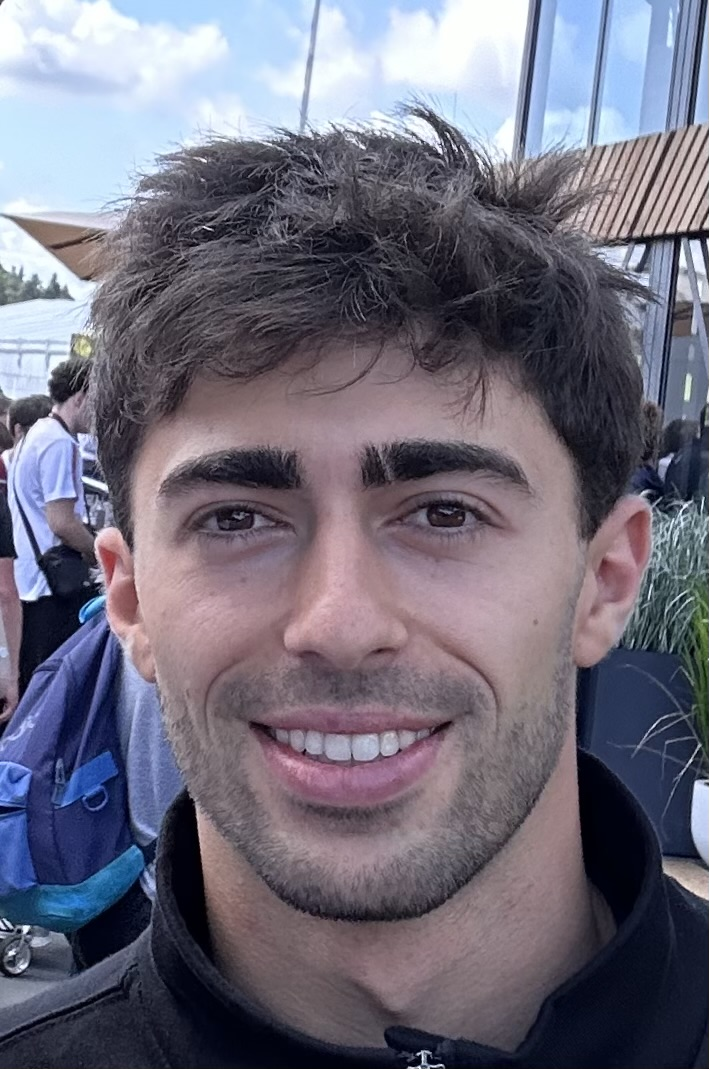
- Vidales in 2024
- Nationality: (Spain) Spanish
- Born: David Vidales Ajenjo; 1 May 2002 (age 24) León, Spain

GT World Challenge Europe Endurance Cup career
- Debut season: 2024 GT World Challenge Europe Endurance Cup
- Current team: AF Corse - Francorchamps Motors
- Categorisation: FIA Gold
- Car number: 71
- Starts: 7 (7 entries)
- Wins: 0
- Podiums: 0
- Poles: 0
- Fastest laps: 0
- Best finish: 31st in 2024 GT World Challenge Europe Endurance Cup

Previous series
- 2023 2022 2021 2020: Super Formula Lights; FIA Formula 3 Championship; F3 Asian Championship; Formula Renault Eurocup

David Vidales Ajenjo (born 1 May 2002) is a Spanish racing driver who last competed in the 2024 GT World Challenge Europe Endurance Cup with AF Corse. He was a race winner in the FIA Formula 3 Championship for Campos Racing and a podium finisher in the Super Formula Lights with B-Max Racing.

== Junior racing career ==
=== Karting ===
Vidales started karting in 2013, where he won the Spanish Karting Championship, he won it for the second time the following year. In 2017, Vidales joined the Tony Kart racing team, where he finished third in the WSK Final Cup, and then in the same year, he came runner up in the CIK-FIA World Championship beating the likes of FIA Formula 3 driver Clément Novalak, former Ferrari Driver Academy driver Gianluca Petecof and British F3 driver Ulysse de Pauw. Vidales then finished third in the Kart World Cup in 2018 and then managed to improve by one place in 2019.

=== Formula Renault Eurocup ===
In late July 2020, Vidales management team announced he'd be joining JD Motorsport for the second round in Imola. In his first professional single seater race Vidales put his car on pole for the forst race. He pulled away from Finnish teammate William Alatalo, despite a couple of safety cars Vidales kept in front and won his first ever single seater race. In the second race, JD Motorsport locked out the front row, Vidales starting in second, however he jumped Alatalo at the start and from that point he controlled the race and won once again. Vidales would finish on the podium a further three times throughout the campaign, and finished sixth in the overall championship standings and second in the rookie standings, only behind Alex Quinn.

=== Formula Regional European Championship ===
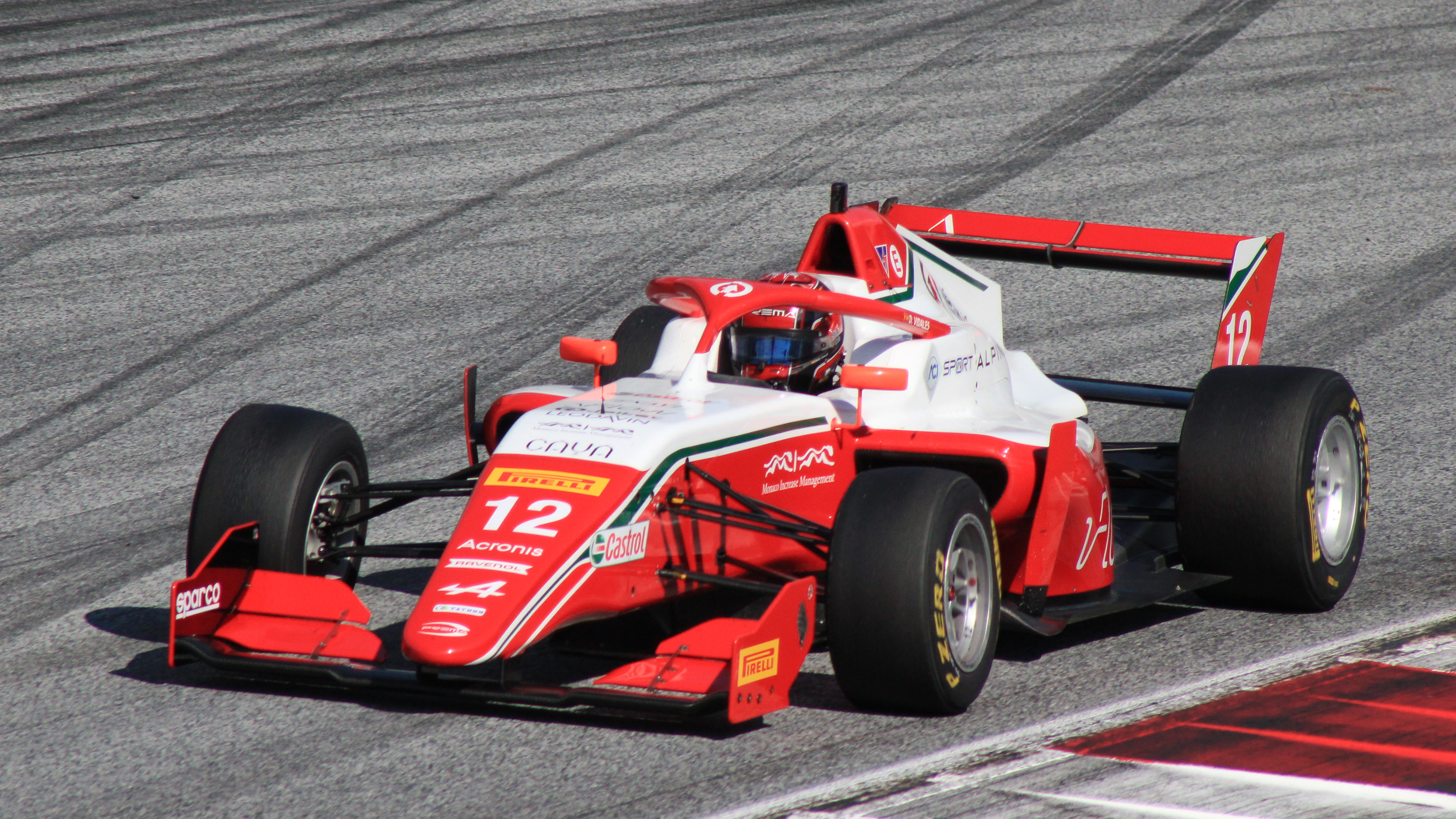
Vidales racing in the 2021 Formula Regional European Championship at the Red Bull Ring

In December 2020, Vidales switched to Prema Powerteam to contest the 2021 season following the merger between Formula Renault Eurocup and the Formula Regional European Championship. Vidales won the first race of the season at Imola, having dominated the race with pole position and every lap led.

=== FIA Formula 3 Championship ===
Vidales joined Campos Racing for the 2022 F3 season, after testing with them the previous year in post-season testing.

=== Formula One ===
In November 2016, Vidales partook in a test with the Ferrari Driver Academy alongside Tony Kart teammate Marcus Armstrong.

=== Super Formula ===
At the end of 2022, Vidales partook in a Super Formula test with B-Max Racing. In March 2023, the team announced that Vidales would switch from Formula 3 to Super Formula Lights for the 2023 season.

== Endurance racing career ==
=== 2024 ===
In 2024, Vidales switched to endurance racing, joining the GT World Challenge Europe Endurance Cup with AF Corse.

== Karting record ==
=== Karting career summary ===
Season	Series	Team	Position
2012	Spanish Championship — Alevin		4th
2013	Spanish Championship — Cadet		1st
2013	Trofeo delle Industrie — 60 Mini		6th
2013	Andrea Margutti Trophy — 60 Mini		29th
2013	WSK Final Cup — 60 Mini	Vidales, Ignacio	14th
2014	WSK Champions Cup — 60 Mini	STR Corse	4th
2014	Andrea Margutti Trophy — 60 Mini	STR Corse	25th
2014	Euro Finale — Mini Max		3rd
2014	Spanish Championship — Cadet		1st
2014	Mini ROK International Final — Bridgestone Final	Pere Vila Str Corse	4th
2014	WSK Master Series — 60 Mini		14th
2014	WSK Final Cup — 60 Mini	STR Corse	4th
2015	South Garda Winter Cup — KFJ		27th
2015	Andrea Margutti Trophy — KFJ		3rd
2015	SKUSA SuperNationals — TaG Junior	Energy Corse America	29th
2015	Trofeo Industrie — KFJ		3rd
2015	WSK Super Master Series — KFJ	Energy Corse	25th
2015	CIK-FIA European Championship — KFJ	Energy Corse	14th
2015	WSK Final Cup — KFJ	Energy Corse	3rd
2016	WSK Champions Cup — OKJ	Energy Corse	9th
2016	WSK Super Master Series — OKJ	Energy Corse	6th
2016	German Karting Championship — Junior	KSM Schumacher Racing Team	4th
2016	CIK-FIA European Championship — OKJ	Tony Kart Racing Team	8th
2016	CIK-FIA World Championship — OKJ	Tony Kart Racing Team	2nd
2016	WSK Final Cup — OKJ	Tony Kart Racing Team	3rd
2017	WSK Champions Cup — OK	Tony Kart Racing Team	6th
2017	South Garda Winter Cup — OK	Tony Kart Racing Team	29th
2017	WSK Super Master Series — OK	Tony Kart Racing Team	4th
2017	CIK-FIA European Championship — OK	Tony Kart Racing Team	10th
2017	CIK-FIA World Championship — OK	Tony Kart Racing Team	2nd
2017	WSK Final Cup — OK	Tony Kart Racing Team	3rd
2018	South Garda Winter Cup — OK	Tony Kart Racing Team	9th
2018	WSK Super Master Series — OK	Tony Kart Racing Team	7th
2018	CIK-FIA European Championship — OK	Tony Kart Racing Team	6th
2018	CIK-FIA European Championship — KZ2	Tony Kart Racing Team	14th
2018	CIK-FIA World Championship — OK	Tony Kart Racing Team	8th
2018	CIK-FIA Karting International Super Cup — KZ2	Tony Kart Racing Team	3rd
2018	WSK Final Cup — OK	Tony Kart Racing Team	25th
2019	FIA Karting International Super Cup — KZ2	Tony Kart Racing Team	2nd
2019	WSK Euro Series — KZ2	Tony Kart Racing Team	29th
2019	CIK-FIA European Championship — KZ2	Tony Kart Racing Team	6th
2024	WSK Final Cup — KZ2	Energy Corse Srl	28th

== Racing record ==
=== Racing career summary ===
Season	Series	Team	Races	Wins	Poles	F/Laps	Podiums	Points	Position
2020	Formula Renault Eurocup	JD Motorsport	18	2	1	2	6	169	6th
2021	Formula Regional European Championship	Prema Powerteam	20	1	1	1	3	102	10th
2021	F3 Asian Championship	Abu Dhabi Racing by Prema	6	0	0	0	1	38	13th
2022	FIA Formula 3 Championship	Campos Racing	17	1	0	0	1	29	16th
2023	Super Formula Lights	B-Max Racing Team	15	0	0	0	1	19	9th
2024	GT World Challenge Europe Endurance Cup	AF Corse - Francorchamps Motors	5	0	0	0	0	1	31st
2025	Italian GT Championship Endurance Cup - GT3 Pro-Am	AF Corse	4	1	0	0	3	80	**1st**

=== Complete Formula Renault Eurocup results ===
(key) (Races in bold indicate pole position) (Races in italics indicate fastest lap)

Year	Team	1	2	3	4	5	6	7	8	9	10	11	12	13	14	15	16	17	18	19	20	Pos	Points
2020	JD Motorsport	MNZ; 1	MNZ; 2	**IMO**; **1**; 1	IMO; 2; 1	NÜR; 1; 3	NÜR; 2; 8	MAG; 1; 2	MAG; 2; 3	ZAN; 1; 3	ZAN; 2; 4	CAT; 1; 11	CAT; 2; 4	SPA; 1; 10	SPA; 2; 16	IMO; 1 Ret	IMO; 2 Ret	HOC; 1; 6	HOC; 2; 7	LEC; 1; 6	LEC; 2; 9	6th	169

=== Complete F3 Asian Championship results ===
(key) (Races in bold indicate pole position) (Races in italics indicate fastest lap)

Year	Entrant	1	2	3	4	5	6	7	8	9	10	11	12	13	14	15	DC	Points
2021	Abu Dhabi Racing by Prema	DUB; 1	DUB; 2	DUB; 3	ABU; 1	ABU; 2	ABU; 3	ABU; 1	ABU; 2	ABU; 3	DUB; 1; 9	DUB; 2; 11	DUB; 3; 2	ABU; 1; 6	ABU; 2; 5	ABU; 3; 12	13th	38

=== Complete Formula Regional European Championship results ===
(key) (Races in bold indicate pole position) (Races in italics indicate fastest lap)

Year	Team	1	2	3	4	5	6	7	8	9	10	11	12	13	14	15	16	17	18	19	20	DC	Points
2021	Prema Powerteam	**IMO**; **1**; 1	IMO; 2; 7	CAT; 1 Ret	CAT; 2 Ret	MCO; 1; 7	MCO; 2; 6	LEC; 1; 11	LEC; 2; 8	ZAN; 1; 11	ZAN; 2; 14	SPA; 1 Ret	SPA; 2; 25	RBR; 1; 13	RBR; 2; 7	VAL; 1; 2	VAL; 2; 5	MUG; 1; 3	MUG; 2; 15	MNZ; 1; 10	MNZ; 2 Ret	10th	102

=== Complete FIA Formula 3 Championship results ===
(key) (Races in bold indicate pole position; races in italics indicate points for the fastest lap of top ten finishers)

Year	Entrant	1	2	3	4	5	6	7	8	9	10	11	12	13	14	15	16	17	18	DC	Points
2022	Campos Racing	BHR; SPR; 10	BHR; FEA; 8	IMO; SPR; 11	IMO; FEA; 8	CAT; SPR; 1	CAT; FEA; Ret	SIL; SPR; 12	SIL; FEA; 9	RBR; SPR; 18	RBR; FEA; 12	HUN; SPR; Ret	HUN; FEA; 13	SPA; SPR; 7	SPA; FEA; 8	ZAN; SPR; 21	ZAN; FEA; Ret	MNZ; SPR; DNS	MNZ; FEA; Ret	16th	29

=== Complete Super Formula Lights results ===
(key) (Races in bold indicate pole position) (Races in italics indicate fastest lap)

Year	Entrant	1	2	3	4	5	6	7	8	9	10	11	12	13	14	15	16	17	18	Pos	Points
2023	B-Max Racing Team	AUT; 1; 4	AUT; 2 Ret	AUT; 3; 4	SUG; 1; 11	SUG; 2; 5	SUG; 3; 6	SUZ; 1; 6	SUZ; 2; 6	SUZ; 3; 10	FUJ; 1 Ret	FUJ; 2; 10	FUJ; 3; 10	OKA; 1; 4	OKA; 2; 7	OKA; 3; 3	MOT; 1 DNS	MOT; 2 WD	MOT; 3 WD	9th	19

=== Complete GT World Challenge Europe results ===
==== GT World Challenge Europe Endurance Cup ====
(Races in bold indicate pole position) (Races in italics indicate fastest lap)

Year	Team	Car	Class	1	2	3	4	5	6	7	Pos.	Points
2024	AF Corse - Francorchamps Motors	Ferrari 296 GT3	Pro	LEC; 17	SPA; 6H; 13	SPA; 12H; 22	SPA; 24H; Ret	NÜR; 10	MNZ; 34	JED; 21	31st	1
