= 2023 Baku Formula 2 round =

Motor racing event in Baku, Azerbaijan

(Azerbaijan) 2023 Baku Formula 2 round
Round details
- Round 4 of 13 in the 2023 FIA Formula 2 Championship.
- Location: Baku City Circuit, Baku, Azerbaijan
- Course: Street Circuit; 6.003 km (3.730 mi)

Sprint Race
- Date: 29 April 2023
- Laps: 21
Podium
| First | (United Kingdom) Oliver Bearman | Prema Racing |
| Second | (Denmark) Frederik Vesti | Prema Racing |
| Third | (United States) Jak Crawford | Hitech Pulse-Eight |
Fastest lap
| Driver | (United Kingdom) Oliver Bearman | Prema Racing |
- Time: 1:55.796 (on lap 14)

Feature Race
- Date: 30 April 2023
- Laps: 29
Pole position
| Driver | (United Kingdom) Oliver Bearman | Prema Racing |
| Time | 1:52.652 | |
Podium
| First | (United Kingdom) Oliver Bearman | Prema Racing |
| Second | (Brazil) Enzo Fittipaldi | Rodin Carlin |
| Third | (France) Théo Pourchaire | ART Grand Prix |
Fastest lap
| Driver | (France) Isack Hadjar | Hitech Pulse-Eight |
- Time: 1:53.478 (on lap 27)

The 2023 Baku FIA Formula 2 round was a motor racing event held between 28 and 30 April 2023 at the Baku City Circuit, Baku, Azerbaijan. It was the fourth round of the 2023 FIA Formula 2 Championship and was held in support of the 2023 Azerbaijan Grand Prix.

== Classification ==
=== Qualifying ===
| Pos. | No. | Driver | Entrant | Time/Gap | Grid SR | Grid FR |
|---|---|---|---|---|---|---|
| 1 | 8 | (United Kingdom) Oliver Bearman | Prema Racing | 1:52.652 | 9 | 1 |
| 2 | 4 | (Brazil) Enzo Fittipaldi | Rodin Carlin | +0.012 | 8 | 2 |
| 3 | 5 | (France) Théo Pourchaire | ART Grand Prix | +0.053 | 11^{1} | 3 |
| 4 | 7 | (Denmark) Frederik Vesti | Prema Racing | +0.071 | 7 | 4 |
| 5 | 1 | (Norway) Dennis Hauger | MP Motorsport | +0.226 | 6 | 5 |
| 6 | 2 | (India) Jehan Daruvala | MP Motorsport | +0.414 | 5 | 6 |
| 7 | 9 | (United States) Jak Crawford | Hitech Pulse-Eight | +0.487 | 4 | 7 |
| 8 | 6 | (France) Victor Martins | ART Grand Prix | +0.561 | 3 | 8 |
| 9 | 3 | (Barbados) Zane Maloney | Rodin Carlin | +0.645 | 2 | 9 |
| 10 | 22 | (Netherlands) Richard Verschoor | Van Amersfoort Racing | +0.807 | 1 | 10 |
| 11 | 25 | (Switzerland) Ralph Boschung | Campos Racing | +0.985 | 10 | 11 |
| 12 | 20 | (Czech Republic) Roman Staněk | Trident | +0.987 | 12 | 12 |
| 13 | 12 | (Monaco) Arthur Leclerc | DAMS | +1.098 | 13 | 13 |
| 14 | 24 | (India) Kush Maini | Campos Racing | +1.268 | 14 | 14 |
| 15 | 23 | (United States) Juan Manuel Correa | Van Amersfoort Racing | +1.313 | 15 | 15 |
| 16 | 14 | (Australia) Jack Doohan | Invicta Virtuosi Racing | +1.498 | 16 | 16 |
| 17 | 11 | (Japan) Ayumu Iwasa | DAMS | +1.565 | 17 | 17 |
| 18 | 10 | (France) Isack Hadjar | Hitech Pulse-Eight | +1.639 | 18 | 18 |
| 19 | 21 | (France) Clément Novalak | Trident | +1.757 | 19 | 19 |
| 20 | 16 | (Israel) Roy Nissany | PHM Racing by Charouz | +2.031 | 20 | 20 |
| 21 | 15 | (Belgium) Amaury Cordeel | Invicta Virtuosi Racing | +2.896 | 21 | 21 |
107% time: 2:00.580 (+7.888)
| — | 17 | (United States) Brad Benavides | PHM Racing by Charouz | +32.439 | 22 | 22 |

Notes

- ^1 – Théo Pourchaire received a three-place grid drop for impeding Kush Maini, subsequently dropping him down from eighth to eleventh for the Sprint Race.

=== Sprint race ===
| Pos. | No. | Driver | Entrant | Laps | Time/Retired | Grid | Points |
|---|---|---|---|---|---|---|---|
| 1 | 8 | (United Kingdom) Oliver Bearman | Prema Racing | 21 | 51:27.274 | 9 | 10 (1) |
| 2 | 7 | (Denmark) Frederik Vesti | Prema Racing | 21 | +0.870 | 7 | 8 |
| 3 | 9 | (United States) Jak Crawford | Hitech Pulse-Eight | 21 | +3.090 | 4 | 6 |
| 4 | 24 | (India) Kush Maini | Campos Racing | 21 | +6.485 | 14 | 5 |
| 5 | 4 | (Brazil) Enzo Fittipaldi | Rodin Carlin | 21 | +7.879 | 8 | 4 |
| 6 | 23 | (United States) Juan Manuel Correa | Van Amersfoort Racing | 21 | +10.405 | 15 | 3 |
| 7 | 21 | (France) Clément Novalak | Trident | 21 | +11.090 | 19 | 2 |
| 8 | 20 | (Czech Republic) Roman Staněk | Trident | 21 | +15.065 | 12 | 1 |
| 9 | 15 | (Belgium) Amaury Cordeel | Invicta Virtuosi Racing | 21 | +16.232 | 21 | |
| 10 | 17 | (United States) Brad Benavides | PHM Racing by Charouz | 21 | +18.140 | 22 | |
| 11 | 10 | (France) Isack Hadjar | Hitech Pulse-Eight | 21 | +13.602^{1} | 18 | |
| 12^{2} | 1 | (Norway) Dennis Hauger | MP Motorsport | 18 | Collision | 6 | |
| 13^{2} | 6 | (France) Victor Martins | ART Grand Prix | 18 | Collision | 3 | |
| 14^{2} | 2 | (India) Jehan Daruvala | MP Motorsport | 18 | Collision | 5 | |
| 15^{2} | 5 | (France) Théo Pourchaire | ART Grand Prix | 18 | Collision | 11 | |
| 16^{2} | 12 | (Monaco) Arthur Leclerc | DAMS | 18 | Collision | 13 | |
| 17^{2} | 14 | (Australia) Jack Doohan | Invicta Virtuosi Racing | 18 | Spun Off | 16 | |
| DNF | 16 | (Israel) Roy Nissany | PHM Racing by Charouz | 13 | Accident | 20 | |
| DNF | 3 | (Barbados) Zane Maloney | Rodin Carlin | 12 | Driveshaft | 2 | |
| DNF | 11 | (Japan) Ayumu Iwasa | DAMS | 10 | DRS system | 17 | |
| DNF | 25 | (Switzerland) Ralph Boschung | Campos Racing | 2 | Accident | 10 | |
| DNF | 22 | (Netherlands) Richard Verschoor | Van Amersfoort Racing | 0 | Collision damage | 1 | |
Fastest lap set by (United Kingdom) Oliver Bearman: 1:55.796 (lap 14)

Notes

- ^1 – Isack Hadjar originally finished eighth, but received a five-second time-penalty for illegally overtaking Jack Doohan before the control line at the Safety Car restart on lap 19, subsequently dropping him out of the points down in eleventh.
- ^2 – Six drivers were Collision in a multi-car Pile-up at the Safety Car restart on lap 19, but all have been classified as they completed over 90% of the race distance.

=== Feature race ===
| Pos. | No. | Driver | Entrant | Laps | Time/Retired | Grid | Points |
|---|---|---|---|---|---|---|---|
| 1 | 8 | (United Kingdom) Oliver Bearman | Prema Racing | 29 | 57:23.163 | 1 | 25 (2) |
| 2 | 4 | (Brazil) Enzo Fittipaldi | Rodin Carlin | 29 | +2.315 | 2 | 18 |
| 3 | 5 | (France) Théo Pourchaire | ART Grand Prix | 29 | +2.607 | 3 | 15 |
| 4 | 7 | (Denmark) Frederik Vesti | Prema Racing | 29 | +15.223 | 4 | 12 |
| 5 | 24 | (India) Kush Maini | Campos Racing | 29 | +15.792 | 14 | 10 |
| 6 | 1 | (Norway) Dennis Hauger | MP Motorsport | 29 | +17.301 | 5 | 8 |
| 7 | 10 | (France) Isack Hadjar | Hitech Pulse-Eight | 29 | +19.576 | 18 | 6 (1) |
| 8 | 22 | (Netherlands) Richard Verschoor | Van Amersfoort Racing | 29 | +26.869 | 10 | 4 |
| 9 | 9 | (United States) Jak Crawford | Hitech Pulse-Eight | 29 | +27.541 | 7 | 2 |
| 10 | 12 | (Monaco) Arthur Leclerc | DAMS | 29 | +29.695 | 13 | 1 |
| 11 | 3 | (Barbados) Zane Maloney | Rodin Carlin | 29 | +30.390 | 9 | |
| 12 | 11 | (Japan) Ayumu Iwasa | DAMS | 29 | +32.806 | 17 | |
| 13 | 23 | (United States) Juan Manuel Correa | Van Amersfoort Racing | 29 | +39.092 | 15 | |
| 14 | 2 | (India) Jehan Daruvala | MP Motorsport | 29 | +39.243 | 6 | |
| 15 | 14 | (Australia) Jack Doohan | Invicta Virtuosi Racing | 29 | +40.007 | 16 | |
| 16 | 21 | (France) Clément Novalak | Trident | 29 | +40.017 | 19 | |
| 17 | 20 | (Czech Republic) Roman Staněk | Trident | 29 | +42.023 | 12 | |
| 18 | 16 | (Israel) Roy Nissany | PHM Racing by Charouz | 29 | +53.202 | 20 | |
| 19 | 15 | (Belgium) Amaury Cordeel | Invicta Virtuosi Racing | 29 | +57.858 | 21 | |
| 20 | 25 | (Switzerland) Ralph Boschung | Campos Racing | 29 | +1:01.267 | 11 | |
| DNF | 17 | (United States) Brad Benavides | PHM Racing by Charouz | 8 | Accident | 22 | |
| DSQ^{1} | 6 | (France) Victor Martins | ART Grand Prix | 29 | Disqualified | 8 | |
Fastest lap set by (France) Isack Hadjar: 1:53.478 (lap 27)

Notes

- ^1 – Victor Martins originally finished fourth, but was later disqualified from the Feature race due to a technical infringement.

== Standings after the event ==
Drivers' Championship standings

| | Pos. | Driver | Points |
|---|---|---|---|
| 1 | 1 | (France) Théo Pourchaire | 65 |
| 1 | 2 | (Denmark) Frederik Vesti | 62 |
| 2 | 3 | (Japan) Ayumu Iwasa | 58 |
| 12 | 4 | (United Kingdom) Oliver Bearman | 41 |
| 4 | 5 | (India) Kush Maini | 41 |

Teams' Championship standings

| | Pos. | Team | Points |
|---|---|---|---|
| 4 | 1 | (Italy) Prema Racing | 103 |
| 1 | 2 | (France) DAMS | 92 |
| 1 | 3 | (France) ART Grand Prix | 82 |
| | 4 | (Spain) Campos Racing | 74 |
| 2 | 5 | (Netherlands) MP Motorsport | 70 |

- Note: Only the top five positions are included for both sets of standings.

== See also ==
- 2023 Azerbaijan Grand Prix

| Previous round: 2023 Melbourne Formula 2 round | FIA Formula 2 Championship; 2023 season | Next round: 2023 Monte Carlo Formula 2 round |
| Previous round: 2022 Baku Formula 2 round | Baku Formula 2 round | Next round: 2024 Baku Formula 2 round |
