= 2023 Sakhir Formula 2 round =

Motor racing event

(Bahrain) 2023 Sakhir Formula 2 round
Round details
- Round 1 of 13 in the 2023 FIA Formula 2 Championship.
- Layout of the Bahrain International Circuit
- Location: Bahrain International Circuit; Sakhir, Bahrain
- Course: Permanent racing facility 5.412 km (3.363 mi)

Sprint Race
- Date: 4 March 2023
- Laps: 23
Podium
First	(Switzerland) Ralph Boschung	Campos Racing
Second	(Norway) Dennis Hauger	MP Motorsport
Third	(France) Victor Martins	ART Grand Prix
Fastest lap
Driver	(United Kingdom) Oliver Bearman	Prema Racing
- Time: 1:46.953 (on lap 16)

Feature Race
- Date: 5 March 2023
- Laps: 32
Pole position
Driver	(France) Théo Pourchaire	ART Grand Prix
Time	1:40.903	
Podium
First	(France) Théo Pourchaire	ART Grand Prix
Second	(Switzerland) Ralph Boschung	Campos Racing
Third	(Barbados) Zane Maloney	Rodin Carlin
Fastest lap
Driver	(Netherlands) Richard Verschoor	Van Amersfoort Racing
- Time: 1:47.321 (on lap 18)

The 2023 Sakhir FIA Formula 2 round was a motor racing event held between 3 and 5 March 2023 at the Bahrain International Circuit, Sakhir, Bahrain. It was the first race of the 2023 FIA Formula 2 Championship and was held in support of the 2023 Bahrain Grand Prix.

== Background ==
=== Team changes ===
German Formula 4 team PHM Racing took over the entry and assets of Charouz Racing System at the end of the 2022 season, and runs in cooperation with the Czech squad under the PHM Racing by Charouz moniker.

=== Driver changes ===
As the category's sporting regulations state, reigning Drivers' Champion Felipe Drugovich was unable to defend the title and therefore left the series. This year's championship also saw the return of American driver Juan Manuel Correa, who returned to the series after his heavy accident at the 2019 Spa-Francorchamps Formula 2 round in which Anthoine Hubert lost his life.

== Classification ==
=== Qualifying ===
Pos.	No.	Driver	Entrant	Time/Gap	Grid SR	Grid FR
1	5	(France) Théo Pourchaire	ART Grand Prix	1:40.903	10	1
2	6	(France) Victor Martins	ART Grand Prix	+0.751	8	2
3	22	(Netherlands) Richard Verschoor	Van Amersfoort Racing	+0.900	7	3
4	1	(Norway) Dennis Hauger	MP Motorsport	+0.928	6	4
5	7	(Denmark) Frederik Vesti	Prema Racing	+0.994	9^{1}	5
6	24	(India) Kush Maini	Campos Racing	+1.024	5	6
7	11	(Japan) Ayumu Iwasa	DAMS	+1.031	4	7
8	12	(Monaco) Arthur Leclerc	DAMS	+1.070	3	8
9	20	(Czech Republic) Roman Staněk	Trident	+1.085	2	9
10	25	(Switzerland) Ralph Boschung	Campos Racing	+1.107	1	10
11	2	(India) Jehan Daruvala	MP Motorsport	+1.114	11	11
12	8	(United Kingdom) Oliver Bearman	Prema Racing	+1.123	12	12
13	4	(Brazil) Enzo Fittipaldi	Rodin Carlin	+1.146	13	13
14	10	(France) Isack Hadjar	Hitech Pulse-Eight	+1.189	14	14
15	15	(Belgium) Amaury Cordeel	Invicta Virtuosi Racing	+1.189	15	15
16	23	(United States) Juan Manuel Correa	Van Amersfoort Racing	+1.206	16	16
17	14	(Australia) Jack Doohan	Invicta Virtuosi Racing	+1.209	17	17
18	3	(Barbados) Zane Maloney	Rodin Carlin	+1.282	18	18
19	9	(United States) Jak Crawford	Hitech Pulse-Eight	+1.331	19	19
20	17	(United States) Brad Benavides	PHM Racing by Charouz	+1.590	20	20
21	16	(Israel) Roy Nissany	PHM Racing by Charouz	+1.599	21	21
22	21	(France) Clément Novalak	Trident	+1.667	22	22
107% time: 1:47.966 (+7.063)

Notes

- ^1 – Frederik Vesti has been handed a three-place grid drop for impeding Arthur Leclerc during Qualifying, demoting him to ninth place for Saturday's Sprint race.

=== Sprint race ===
Pos.	No.	Driver	Entrant	Laps	Time/Retired	Grid	Points
1	25	(Switzerland) Ralph Boschung	Campos Racing	23	41:50.597	1	10
2	1	(Norway) Dennis Hauger	MP Motorsport	23	+10.848	6	8
3	6	(France) Victor Martins	ART Grand Prix	23	+16.162	8	6
4	11	(Japan) Ayumu Iwasa	DAMS	23	+24.494	4	5
5	5	(France) Théo Pourchaire	ART Grand Prix	23	+29.709	10	4 (1)
6	2	(India) Jehan Daruvala	MP Motorsport	23	+30.901	11	3
7	24	(India) Kush Maini	Campos Racing	23	+41.541	5	2
8	4	(Brazil) Enzo Fittipaldi	Rodin Carlin	23	+43.065	13	1
9	3	(Barbados) Zane Maloney	Rodin Carlin	23	+44.135	18	
10	23	(United States) Juan Manuel Correa	Van Amersfoort Racing	23	+48.540	16	
11	14	(Australia) Jack Doohan	Invicta Virtuosi Racing	23	+49.251	17	
12	12	(Monaco) Arthur Leclerc	DAMS	23	+50.164	3	
13	20	(Czech Republic) Roman Staněk	Trident	23	+50.625	2	
14	9	(United States) Jak Crawford	Hitech Pulse-Eight	23	+52.283	19	
15	8	(United Kingdom) Oliver Bearman	Prema Racing	23	+53.752	12	
16	21	(France) Clément Novalak	Trident	23	+54.607	22	
17	7	(Denmark) Frederik Vesti	Prema Racing	23	+54.645	9	
18	16	(Israel) Roy Nissany	PHM Racing by Charouz	23	+1:04.486	21	
19	17	(United States) Brad Benavides	PHM Racing by Charouz	23	+1:08.768	20	
20	10	(France) Isack Hadjar	Hitech Pulse-Eight	23	+1:13.323	14	
21	15	(Belgium) Amaury Cordeel	Invicta Virtuosi Racing	23	+1:13.800	15	
22	22	(Netherlands) Richard Verschoor	Van Amersfoort Racing	21	Mechanical^{1}	7	
Fastest lap set by (United Kingdom) Oliver Bearman: 1:46.953 (lap 16)

Notes

- ^1 – Richard Verschoor retired, but was classified as he completed over 90% of the race distance.

=== Feature Race ===
Pos.	No.	Driver	Entrant	Laps	Time/Retired	Grid	Points
1	5	(France) Théo Pourchaire	ART Grand Prix	32	1:01:10.926	1	25 (2)
2	25	(Switzerland) Ralph Boschung	Campos Racing	32	+19.666	10	18
3	3	(Barbados) Zane Maloney	Rodin Carlin	32	+31.587	18	15
4	24	(India) Kush Maini	Campos Racing	32	+38.789	6	12
5	22	(Netherlands) Richard Verschoor	Van Amersfoort Racing	32	+43.082	3	10 (1)
6	12	(Monaco) Arthur Leclerc	DAMS	32	+44.342	8	8
7	10	(France) Isack Hadjar	Hitech Pulse-Eight	32	+46.456	14	6
8	11	(Japan) Ayumu Iwasa	DAMS	32	+50.815	7	4
9	4	(Brazil) Enzo Fittipaldi	Rodin Carlin	32	+51.396	13	2
10	23	(United States) Juan Manuel Correa	Van Amersfoort Racing	32	+51.837	16	1
11	16	(Israel) Roy Nissany	PHM Racing by Charouz	32	+52.939	21	
12	9	(United States) Jak Crawford	Hitech Pulse-Eight	32	+53.329	19	
13	21	(France) Clément Novalak	Trident	32	+53.953	22	
14	8	(United Kingdom) Oliver Bearman	Prema Racing	32	+59.739	12	
15	15	(Belgium) Amaury Cordeel	Invicta Virtuosi Racing	32	+1:00.968	PL	
16	14	(Australia) Jack Doohan	Invicta Virtuosi Racing	32	+1:05.204^{1}	17	
17	2	(India) Jehan Daruvala	MP Motorsport	32	+1:06.463	11	
18	17	(United States) Brad Benavides	PHM Racing by Charouz	32	+1:33.235	20	
DNF	1	(Norway) Dennis Hauger	MP Motorsport	16	Engine	4	
DNF	6	(France) Victor Martins	ART Grand Prix	1	Collision damage	2	
DNF	7	(Denmark) Frederik Vesti	Prema Racing	1	Collision damage	5	
DNF	20	(Czech Republic) Roman Staněk	Trident	0	Collision	9	
Fastest lap set by (Netherlands) Richard Verschoor: 1:47.321 (lap 18)

== Standings after the event ==
Drivers' Championship standings

Pos.	Driver	Points
1	(France) Théo Pourchaire	32
2	(Switzerland) Ralph Boschung	28
3	(Barbados) Zane Maloney	15
4	(India) Kush Maini	14
5	(Netherlands) Richard Verschoor	11

Teams' Championship standings

Pos.	Team	Points
1	(Spain) Campos Racing	42
2	(France) ART Grand Prix	38
3	(United Kingdom) Rodin Carlin	18
4	(France) DAMS	17
5	(Netherlands) Van Amersfoort Racing	12

- Note: Only the top five positions are included for both sets of standings.

== See also ==
- 2023 Bahrain Grand Prix
- 2023 Sakhir Formula 3 round

Previous round: 2022 Yas Island Formula 2 round	FIA Formula 2 Championship; 2023 season	Next round: 2023 Jeddah Formula 2 round
Previous round: 2022 Sakhir Formula 2 round	Sakhir Formula 2 round	Next round: 2024 Sakhir Formula 2 round
