= 2023 Formula 2 Championship =

Motor racing championship

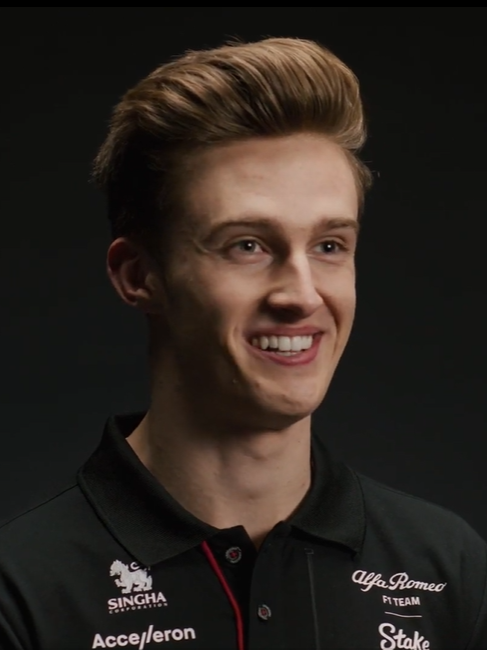
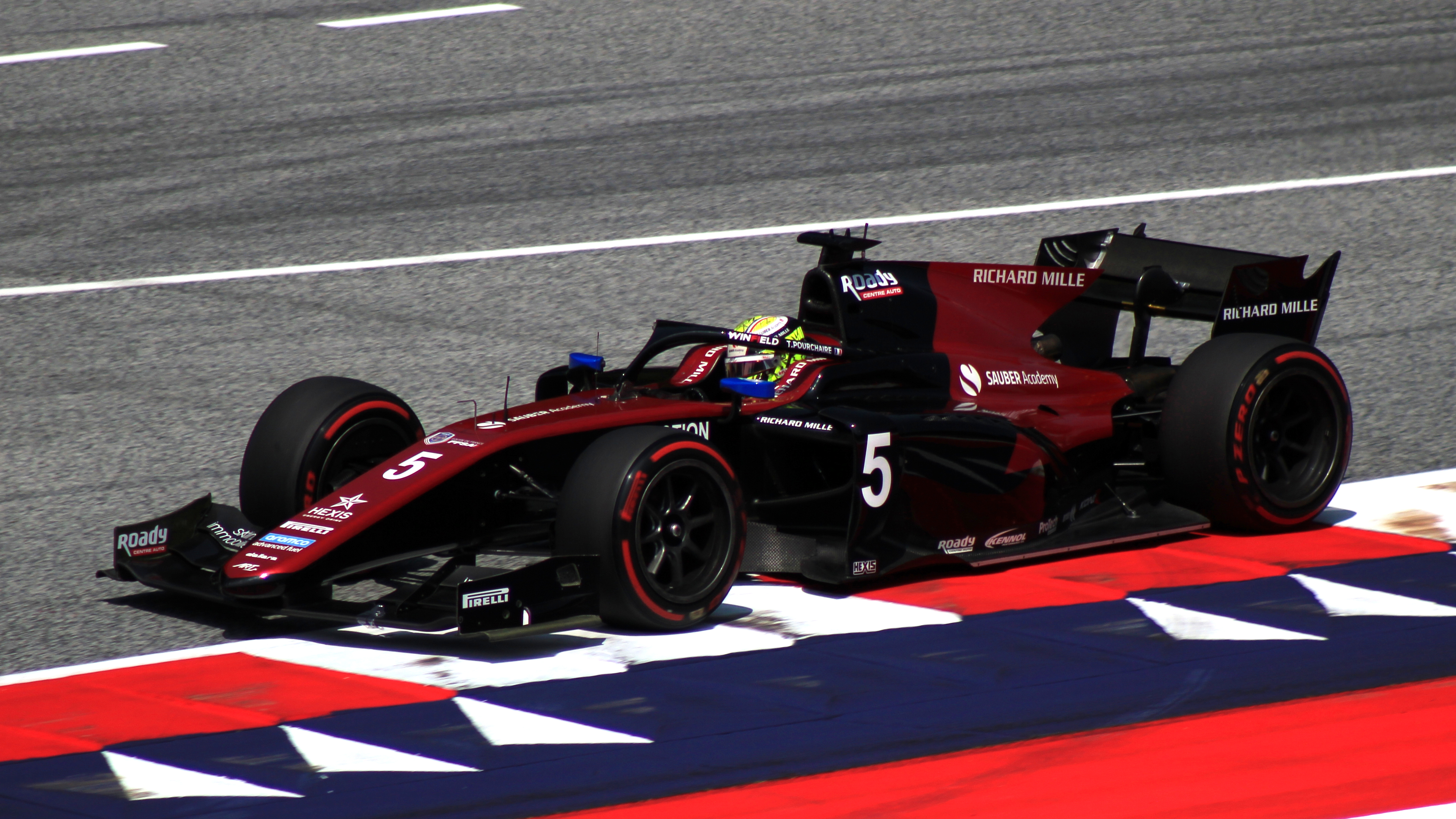
Théo Pourchaire (left) and his team, ART Grand Prix (right), won the Drivers' and Teams' Championships, respectively.

The 2023 FIA Formula 2 Championship was a motor racing championship for Formula 2 cars sanctioned by the Fédération Internationale de l'Automobile (FIA). The championship was the fifty-seventh season of Formula 2 racing and the seventh season run under the FIA Formula 2 Championship moniker. It was an open-wheel racing category serving as the second tier of formula racing in the FIA Global Pathway. The category was run in support of selected rounds of the 2023 Formula One World Championship. As the championship was a spec series, all teams and drivers competing in the championship ran the same car, the Dallara F2 2018.

Despite winning one race all season, Théo Pourchaire clinched the drivers' championship on the final round in Abu Dhabi for ART Grand Prix, who took its first teams' title in F2 history. Prema Racing's Frederik Vesti was runner-up, followed by Invicta Virtuosi Racing's Jack Doohan.

After all 26 races were completed in this season (the round in Imola being cancelled due to the 2023 Emilia-Romagna floods), 13 different drivers won races: Vesti took six victories, while his teammate Oliver Bearman took four. Ayumu Iwasa and Doohan each won three races, while Dennis Hauger won twice. Aside from Pourchaire, Ralph Boschung took his sole victory on his 96th race start in the sprint race in Bahrain. Other drivers having one victory to their name this season are Jak Crawford and Richard Verschoor who took their and their teams' maiden wins respectively in Austria, and Victor Martins in Silverstone despite receiving a five-second time penalty. Enzo Fittipaldi became a Formula 2 race winner for the first time when he won the sprint race in Belgium, while Isack Hadjar also took his first ever race win in the championship, winning the Zandvoort sprint race, where no points were awarded due to less than two racing laps being completed. Clément Novalak also took his first ever victory in Formula 2 at Zandvoort.

2023 was the final season using the Dallara F2 2018 chassis which debuted in the 2018 season. Starting in 2024, a new chassis will be introduced.

== Entries ==
The following teams and drivers were under contract to compete in the 2023 Formula 2 Championship. As the championship was a spec series, all teams competed with an identical Dallara F2 2018 chassis with a V6 turbo engine developed by Mecachrome. All teams competed with tyres supplied by Pirelli.

Entrant	No.	Driver name	Rounds
(Netherlands) MP Motorsport	1	(Norway) Dennis Hauger	All
(Netherlands) MP Motorsport	2	(India) Jehan Daruvala	1–12
(Netherlands) MP Motorsport	2	(Argentina) Franco Colapinto	13
(United Kingdom) Rodin Carlin	3	(Barbados) Zane Maloney	All
(United Kingdom) Rodin Carlin	4	(Brazil) Enzo Fittipaldi	All
(France) ART Grand Prix	5	(France) Théo Pourchaire	All
(France) ART Grand Prix	6	(France) Victor Martins	All
(Italy) Prema Racing	7	(Denmark) Frederik Vesti	All
(Italy) Prema Racing	8	(United Kingdom) Oliver Bearman	All
(United Kingdom) Hitech Pulse-Eight	9	(United States) Jak Crawford	All
(United Kingdom) Hitech Pulse-Eight	10	(France) Isack Hadjar	All
(France) DAMS	11	(Japan) Ayumu Iwasa	All
(France) DAMS	12	(Monaco) Arthur Leclerc	All
(United Kingdom) Invicta Virtuosi Racing	14	(Australia) Jack Doohan	All
(United Kingdom) Invicta Virtuosi Racing	15	(Belgium) Amaury Cordeel	All
(Germany) PHM Racing by Charouz (1–12) (Germany) PHM Racing (13)	16	(Israel) Roy Nissany	All
(Germany) PHM Racing by Charouz (1–12) (Germany) PHM Racing (13)	17	(United States) Brad Benavides	1–9
(Germany) PHM Racing by Charouz (1–12) (Germany) PHM Racing (13)	17	(United Kingdom) Josh Mason	10–13
(Italy) Trident	20	(Czech Republic) Roman Staněk	All
(Italy) Trident	21	(France) Clément Novalak	1–12
(Italy) Trident	21	(Estonia) Paul Aron	13
(Netherlands) Van Amersfoort Racing	22	(Netherlands) Richard Verschoor	All
(Netherlands) Van Amersfoort Racing	23	(United States) Juan Manuel Correa	All
(Spain) Campos Racing	24	(India) Kush Maini	All
(Spain) Campos Racing	25	(Switzerland) Ralph Boschung	All

=== Team changes ===
German Formula 4 team PHM Racing took over the entry and assets of Charouz Racing System at the end of the 2022 season, and ran in cooperation with the Czech squad under the PHM Racing by Charouz moniker.

Carlin competed under new ownership in 2023. The New Zealand-based car manufacturer Rodin Cars became majority shareholder of the team. With that, the team's name changed to Rodin Carlin.

Hitech partnered with hardware company Pulse-Eight during the off-season, changing the official name of the team to Hitech Pulse-Eight.

Virtuosi Racing and the Invicta Watch Group announced a multi-year strategic partnership which saw the name of the team change to Invicta Virtuosi Racing.

==== Mid-season changes ====
PHM Racing parted ways with Charouz Racing System starting from round 13, losing its support from the Czech team. From then on, the team operated independently of them.

=== Driver changes ===
Reigning Teams' Champions MP Motorsport started the season with a completely new driver lineup: Reigning Formula 2 Champion Felipe Drugovich left the series, whilst Clément Novalak left the team, finishing fourteenth with them in last year's Drivers' Championship. The team opted for the two drivers who competed for Prema Racing last season: 2021 FIA Formula 3 Champion Dennis Hauger, who came tenth with Prema in his rookie season, and Jehan Daruvala, who came seventh and embarked on his fourth season in the championship.

Rodin Carlin saw both their drivers departing the championship, with Logan Sargeant graduating to Formula One with Williams Racing and Liam Lawson moving to the Super Formula Championship to compete with Red Bull-affiliated Team Mugen. The driver line-up consisted of two Red Bull Junior Team drivers in 2023: Enzo Fittipaldi moved over from Charouz Racing System and Zane Maloney embarked on his first full Formula 2 season after debuting in the 2022 finale with Trident.

ART Grand Prix driver Frederik Vesti left the team and joined Prema Racing. Victor Martins replaced him, stepping up to ART's Formula 2 squad after winning the 2022 FIA Formula 3 Championship with the same team.

Prema Racing replaced their MP-bound driver pairing of Dennis Hauger and Jehan Daruvala with Ferrari Driver Academy member Oliver Bearman, who finished third in the 2022 FIA Formula 3 Championship standings, and Frederik Vesti, who returned to Prema Racing after finishing ninth in the standings as a rookie in Formula 2 with ART Grand Prix.

Hitech Pulse-Eight was another team having a Red Bull junior driver lineup in 2023. The team signed Isack Hadjar, who came fourth in FIA Formula 3 in 2022 with the same outfit, and Jak Crawford, who returned to Hitech after last competing for them in the 2021 FIA Formula 3 Championship and coming seventh with Prema Racing in FIA Formula 3 in 2022. Marcus Armstrong left the series after three seasons and moved to Chip Ganassi Racing in IndyCar.

DAMS signed Ferrari Driver Academy member Arthur Leclerc, who stepped up to Formula 2 after two seasons in FIA Formula 3 with Prema Racing, with a best result of sixth in the Driver's Standings. He replaced Roy Nissany.

Invicta Virtuosi Racing did not rehire Marino Sato and instead signed Amaury Cordeel, who came 17th in his debut Formula 2 season with Van Amersfoort Racing in 2022. Sato left the championship to join United Autosports in the European Le Mans Series.

Newly formed team PHM Racing by Charouz retained none of Charouz's drivers from 2022; Carlin-bound Enzo Fittipaldi was replaced by Roy Nissany who started his fifth Formula 2 season after finishing 19th with DAMS last season. The second seat was filled by Brad Benavides, who graduated from FIA Formula 3 after finishing the 2022 season in 23rd, driving for Carlin.

Trident also replaced both of their drivers: Clément Novalak returned to the team after last competing for the Italian squad in the 2021 FIA Formula 3 Championship. He partners Roman Staněk, who graduated from FIA Formula 3, finishing fifth in last year's standings, also driving for Trident. Calan Williams left the series and joined WRT in the GT World Challenge Europe, while Richard Verschoor joined Van Amersfoort Racing for his third season.

Partnering Verschoor at Van Amersfoort Racing was Juan Manuel Correa, who made his full-time return to the championship after his injury in the crash which took Anthoine Hubert's life in 2019. The pair replaced Jake Hughes, who left the series to join McLaren for the 2022–23 Formula E World Championship after already ending his 2022 campaign early to focus on securing a seat in Formula E, and Virtuosi-bound Cordeel.

Campos Racing's Olli Caldwell moved to endurance racing to compete with the Alpine Elf Matmut team in the LMP2 class of the FIA World Endurance Championship. His seat was filled by Kush Maini who moved up to Formula 2 after a single year of FIA Formula 3, in which he came 14th.

==== Mid-season changes ====
Euroformula Open driver Josh Mason replaced Brad Benavides at PHM Racing by Charouz from the round at Circuit de Spa-Francorchamps onwards.

Two drivers made their debut in the final round at Yas Marina Circuit. Franco Colapinto replaced Jehan Daruvala at MP Motorsport ahead of a full-time graduation in 2024, while Paul Aron joined Trident, replacing Clément Novalak.

== Race calendar ==
Round	Circuit	Sprint race	Feature race
1	Bahrain International Circuit, Sakhir	4 March	5 March
2	(Saudi Arabia) Jeddah Corniche Circuit, Jeddah	18 March	19 March
3	(Australia) Albert Park Circuit, Melbourne	1 April	2 April
4	(Azerbaijan) Baku City Circuit, Baku	29 April	30 April
5	Circuit de Monaco, Monaco	27 May	28 May
6	(Spain) Circuit de Barcelona-Catalunya, Montmeló	3 June	4 June
7	(Austria) Red Bull Ring, Spielberg	1 July	2 July
8	(United Kingdom) Silverstone Circuit, Silverstone	8 July	9 July
9	(Hungary) Hungaroring, Mogyoród	22 July	23 July
10	(Belgium) Circuit de Spa-Francorchamps, Stavelot	29 July	30 July
11	(Netherlands) Circuit Zandvoort, Zandvoort	26 August	27 August
12	(Italy) Monza Circuit, Monza	2 September	3 September
13	(United Arab Emirates) Yas Marina Circuit, Abu Dhabi	25 November	26 November

=== Calendar changes ===
- The Formula 2 Championship made its debut in Australia, supporting the Australian Grand Prix at the Albert Park Circuit.
- Circuit Paul Ricard did not feature on the calendar due to the French Grand Prix not taking place in 2023.
- The championship was originally scheduled to feature fourteen rounds, but the round at Imola, in support of the Emilia Romagna Grand Prix, was cancelled along with the Formula 1 and FIA Formula 3 rounds as a result of mass flooding which affected the region.

== Regulation changes ==
=== Technical regulations ===
- Formula 2 would run with 55% sustainable fuel in 2023, supplied by Aramco, who replaced Elf Aquitaine as an official fuel partner and supplier after eighteen seasons from GP2 Series era. In a bid to decrease the championships' carbon footprint, an incremental gain in usage is planned until the 2027 season, where usage of 100% sustainable fuel is planned.

== Season report ==
=== Round 1: Bahrain ===
The first feature race pole position of the season was claimed by ART Grand Prix driver Théo Pourchaire in qualifying at the Bahrain International Circuit. Campos Racing's Ralph Boschung started first in the reverse-grid sprint race, having qualified tenth. Boschung held the lead for the entire race, finishing ahead of second-placed Dennis Hauger, who had started sixth. This marked Boschung's first race win since entering the category in 2017.

Collisions on the opening lap of the feature race necessitated the deployment of the safety car and eliminated Frederik Vesti, Victor Martins and Roman Staněk from the race, whilst Boschung took advantage of the retirements to improve from tenth at the start to second place by lap four, a position he kept for the remainder of the race. Zane Maloney, who had started eighteenth, made numerous overtakes in the closing laps to complete the podium in third place. Pole-sitter Pourchaire won the race to claim his sixth victory in Formula 2 and the lead of the Drivers' Championship, four points ahead of Boschung.

=== Round 2: Saudi Arabia ===
ART Grand Prix's Victor Martins qualified fastest at the Jeddah Corniche Circuit with Hitech Pulse-Eight driver Jak Crawford starting first in the sprint race. Crawford lost the lead to DAMS driver Ayumu Iwasa on the second lap and would ultimately drop outside of the points positions by the end of the race. The safety car was deployed twice, firstly when Zane Maloney spun and stalled on track and secondly when championship leader Pourchaire collided with Oliver Bearman during a botched overtake attempt. Iwasa took the victory, his third in Formula 2, having fought off challenges for the lead from Martins, who started tenth, and Jehan Daruvala.

Pole-sitter Martins lost the lead of the feature race to Bearman immediately at the start. Sixth-place Frederik Vesti gained two places at the start and gained third place from Jack Doohan during the pit stops. Bearman and Martins continued to fight for the lead and Martins reclaimed the position on lap eleven; the battle soon allowed Vesti to gain second place from Bearman, who spun a few laps later and would ultimately finish tenth. Martins then spun and was unable to restart his car, allowing Vesti to claim his second Formula 2 race win. Round 2 ended with Ralph Boschung leading the Drivers' Championship by one point over Pourchaire.

=== Round 3: Australia ===
Ayumu Iwasa set the fastest time in a rain-affected qualifying session at the Albert Park Circuit. Dennis Hauger was on pole position for the sprint race, which Enzo Fittipaldi and championship leader Boschung failed to start after accidents on the way to the grid. Hauger kept the lead at the start despite challenges from second-placed Jak Crawford. The safety car was deployed with eight laps remaining to recover Jack Doohan's car, which had stalled after being spun round. Rain now began to fall and some, including both ART Grand Prix drivers, opted to switch to wet-weather tyres. The safety car period was extended when Brad Benavides crashed, leaving only two racing laps at the end and preventing the wet tyre runners from having time to recover positions. Hauger claimed victory, his third in the category.

Pole-sitter Iwasa, Théo Pourchaire and Victor Martins held their positions in the top three at the start of the feature race. Jack Doohan and Jak Crawford collided whilst battling for tenth place, beaching Crawford in the gravel and bringing out the safety car on lap seven. Drivers who started on the soft-compound tyre used this opportunity to make their pit stops. Isack Hadjar and Oliver Bearman collided in the pit lane, and despite both exiting the pits ahead of Martins, Bearman received a puncture and was forced to pit again and Hadjar later lost positions after contact with Pourchaire. The safety car was deployed for a second time with seven laps remaining when Roy Nissany crashed. Enzo Fittipaldi then crashed on the same piece of track, narrowly missing Nissany's stationary car. Martins collided with Dennis Hauger shortly before racing resumed, dropping both to the back of the field and allowing Arthur Leclerc to complete the podium behind Iwasa and Pourchaire. With his second race win of the year, Iwasa took the lead of the Drivers' Championship by eight points over Pourchaire.

=== Round 4: Azerbaijan ===
Oliver Bearman took pole position for the feature race in qualifying at the Baku City Circuit. Richard Verschoor claimed reverse-grid pole for the sprint race. Verschoor and Zane Maloney made contact at the exit of the first turn which gave Verschoor front wing damage and Maloney a puncture, ultimately causing both drivers to retire. This promoted Dennis Hauger, who had made up places from sixth on the grid, into the lead. The race was interrupted by two safety car periods as Ralph Boschung and Roy Nissany were involved in separate incidents. As racing resumed with three laps remaining, six drivers failed to make the first corner, either hitting the wall or running wide and stopping. This included leader Hauger and second-placed Victor Martins. Frederik Vesti inherited the lead, but was overtaken by teammate Bearman seconds before the safety car was deployed, under which the race ended. Bearman had started from ninth on the grid and claimed his first win and podium finish in Formula 2.

In the early laps of the feature race, pole-sitter Bearman traded the lead with Théo Pourchaire, who had started third and passed Enzo Fittipaldi for second. Bearman reclaimed the lead and held the position through the pit stops to take both race wins of the round. Fittipaldi re-passed Pourchaire in the closing laps, with the two drivers completing the podium. Championship leader Ayumu Iwasa failed to score points in Azerbaijan, dropping him to third place in the standings. With his podium finish, Pourchaire reclaimed the championship lead, three points ahead of Vesti, who finished fourth in the feature race.

=== Round 5: Monaco ===
Frederik Vesti set the fastest time in qualifying at the Circuit de Monaco to claim feature race pole position. Isack Hadjar started the sprint race from first place, and maintained his lead at the race start. Kush Maini was spun around by Clément Novalak on the first lap, forcing drivers behind to stop on track. This resulted in the retirements of Ralph Boschung and Roy Nissany and brought out the first safety car. As racing resumed, leader Hadjar slowed and later retired with engine problems, allowing Ayumu Iwasa into the lead. Despite challenges from Jehan Daruvala and a second safety car due to Amaury Cordeel's crash, Iwasa maintained the lead to win for the third time in 2023.

Vesti, Martins and Pourchaire maintained their top three positions at the start of the feature race. Fourth-placed Jack Doohan crashed on lap 24, bringing out the safety car and subsequently the red flags to replace a section of barrier. The race resumed with a rolling start. Dennis Hauger and Roman Staněk were able to make their mandatory tyre change during the red flag, promoting them from their positions towards the back of the grid into the top ten. Shortly after the restart, second-placed Martins was issued a drive-through penalty for failing to slow sufficiently for yellow flags, promoting Zane Maloney to third place behind Pourchaire. Vesti took his second win of the season and claimed the lead of the Drivers' Championship, five points clear of Pourchaire.

=== Round 6: Spain ===
Oliver Bearman claimed his second feature race pole position in qualifying at the Circuit de Barcelona-Catalunya. Amaury Cordeel started the reverse-grid sprint race from pole position, which began with a rolling start due to wet conditions. On the opening lap, Frederik Vesti and Jak Crawford made contact battling for second place, sending Crawford into retirement. Vesti soon passed Cordeel, who would ultimately drop outside the points positions. The track gradually dried and most drivers opted to change to slick tyres when the safety car was deployed to recover Juan Manuel Correa's stranded car. Vesti crossed the finish line first to take his third win of the year, followed by championship rival Théo Pourchaire, who had started ninth.

Pole-sitter Bearman resisted challenges for the lead from Enzo Fittipaldi, Ayumu Iwasa and Pourchaire on the opening lap of the feature race. Some drivers including Victor Martins and championship leader Vesti, who started seventh and eighth respectively, elected to start on the harder compound of tyres and run long. In the closing laps, their new softer tyres and the traffic encountered by their rivals allowed them to gain positions, with Martins finishing on the podium. Bearman and Fittipaldi quickly overtook multiple drivers after pitting and were able to hold their positions, with Bearman taking his third victory of the year. Vesti finished fifth to extend his championship lead over Pourchaire to 11 points.

=== Round 7: Austria ===
Victor Martins achieved his second feature race pole position of the season at the Red Bull Ring. Jak Crawford started from pole in the sprint race, which began in damp conditions; some drivers started on wet-weather tyres and some, including Crawford, on slicks. The cars on wet tyres had the advantage on the opening lap and Crawford soon dropped to sixth place, allowing Arthur Leclerc into the lead. Two safety car periods took place in the early laps to recover the cars of Jehan Daruvala and Richard Verschoor, during which the track quickly began drying and the wet tyre runners pitted for slicks. This allowed Crawford to regain the lead and gave an advantage to the original slick runners; Clément Novalak and Isack Hadjar, who started 20th and 21st respectively, finished third and fourth. Crawford held the lead to take his first Formula 2 victory. Novalak was later disqualified for a technical infringement and Hadjar inherited the place on the podium.

Feature race pole-sitter Martins had a poor start and dropped behind Frederik Vesti and Théo Pourchaire off the start line. Vesti kept the net race lead after the drivers running the softer tyres at the start had made their pit stops, and was followed by Jack Doohan, who had made up places. With 12 laps remaining, the safety car was deployed to recover Leclerc's stranded car, whose wheel had detached. This allowed the drivers running the harder tyres to gain an advantage by making their pit stops. This included Verschoor and Ayumu Iwasa, who used their fresh tyres to pass Vesti and Doohan for the top two positions, having started 11th and 16th, respectively. Verschoor's victory was the first for Van Amersfoort Racing in Formula 2. Vesti's podium finish increased his championship lead to 20 points over Pourchaire. Verschoor dedicated his third victory in his career to his deceased countryman Dilano van 't Hoff, who lost his life the day before during a FRECA race after a collision with three other drivers in wet conditions at Circuit de Spa-Francorchamps.

=== Round 8: United Kingdom ===
Victor Martins set the fastest qualifying time at Silverstone Circuit, his third pole position of the year. The sprint race began with championship leader Vesti at the front of a rolling start in wet conditions. Racing was interrupted when Brad Benavides and Clément Novalak collided, sending Benavides into the barriers. Oliver Bearman, who started fifth, quickly made overtakes and improved to second, but a spin dropped him outside the podium positions. Isack Hadjar then spent much of the race in second place but fell back in the closing laps. Vesti led the entire race distance to take his fourth win of the season.

Martins and Ayumu Iwasa traded the lead at the start of the feature race. Martins reclaimed the position later in the lap and soon built a gap to second place. A safety car deployment on lap seven, to recover the stalled car of Amaury Cordeel, prompted the soft tyre runners to make their pit stops. Racing was paused again almost immediately after the restart when a collision involving Dennis Hauger, Roman Staněk and Frederik Vesti eliminated the latter two. Soon after racing resumed, Martins was issued a five-second time penalty as his lap one pass on Iwasa was judged to have been performed off-track. Later in the race, a crash between teammates Kush Maini and Ralph Boschung caused the safety car to be deployed for a third time, and the hard tyre runners responded by making their pit stops. Arthur Leclerc used his new soft tyres to improve to third place, but was unable to overtake Zane Maloney and his tyre advantage soon faded. Martins was able to extend his lead to seven seconds over Maloney, keeping his position despite his penalty and taking his first Formula 2 race win. Théo Pourchaire's podium finish and Vesti's retirement resulted in Vesti's lead in the championship being cut to six points at the conclusion of the round.

=== Round 9: Hungary ===
Feature race pole position at the Hungaroring was taken by Jack Doohan, his first of the season and his fourth in Formula 2. Kush Maini started from the front in the sprint race, but lost the lead to Dennis Hauger at the first turn and was passed by Ayumu Iwasa shortly afterwards. Hauger led the rest of the race to win for the second time in 2023. Maini held third place for much of the race but lost the podium position to Théo Pourchaire, who was himself soon passed by Oliver Bearman.

Doohan led the entirety of the feature race and claimed the fastest lap for his first victory of the year. He was followed by championship leader Vesti, who had passed Victor Martins for second place on the opening lap. Vesti's podium extended his lead in the standings to 11 points over Pourchaire, who had challenged Martins for the podium in the feature race but ultimately dropped to sixth place.

=== Round 10: Belgium ===
Prema Racing claimed a 1–2 in qualifying at the Circuit de Spa-Francorchamps; Oliver Bearman achieved his third pole of the year followed by Vesti in second. Jehan Daruvala started in first place for the sprint race, but was forced to retire in the early laps when his headrest loosened and fell out of the car, handing the lead to Richard Verschoor. In the closing laps, Enzo Fittipaldi caught up to Verschoor and passed him to achieve his first victory in the championship. Verschoor was later disqualified from the results for using a non-approved throttle map.

Polesitter Bearman maintained his lead at the beginning of the feature race. First-lap contact between Ayumu Iwasa and Dennis Hauger ended both drivers' races and brought out the safety car; Iwasa retired with damage and Hauger was black-flagged for receiving a push start from the marshals. Race leaders Bearman and Pourchaire pitted together with ten laps remaining. ART Grand Prix performed the quicker pit stop and Pourchaire rejoined the track ahead of Bearman. The safety car was deployed shortly after to recover the car of Jak Crawford, which had stalled after contact with Juan Manuel Correa. Jack Doohan, who had started 11th on the harder tyre compound and now led the race after others had pitted, made his own pit stop for softer tyres and emerged closely behind Pourchaire in second place. Doohan overtook Pourchaire with two laps remaining to take his second victory of the season. Fittipaldi inherited the final podium place after Bearman and Victor Martins both received time penalties. Pourchaire's podium finish promoted him to the lead of the Drivers' Championship, 12 points ahead of Vesti, who had qualified second but failed to start the feature race after crashing on his way to the grid.

=== Round 11: Netherlands ===
Jak Crawford claimed pole position at Circuit Zandvoort in a qualifying session interrupted by red flags. Pourchaire was due to start the sprint race from first place, but mechanical issues prior to the start forced him to start from the pit lane. Isack Hadjar instead led a rolling start in wet conditions. A first-lap collision involving Crawford, Kush Maini and Ralph Boschung brought out the red flags. The race was resumed behind the safety car, but the poor weather conditions were judged to be too unsafe and the race was red-flagged and not restarted. As two laps of racing had not occurred, no points were awarded.

Crawford led a rolling start for the feature race on a damp track. Frontrunners Vesti, Doohan and Bearman spun on the opening lap and Martins took to the gravel to avoid collisions. Doohan's spin caused his retirement before he could cross the start line. Ayumu Iwasa then collided with Kush Maini as racing resumed, dropping him down the field. This left sixth-placed Pourchaire as the only title contender near the front. He made his pit stop a lap later than most of the drivers ahead and emerged in front of all of them, including Crawford, but crashed out of the race shortly afterwards. Clément Novalak, who started 13th and now led the race by virtue of having not made a pit stop, entered the pit lane seconds before the deployment of the safety car and retained his lead upon exiting. Vesti, who had recovered to the points positions, then retired under safety car conditions when both his rear wheels detached having been fitted improperly during his pit stop. Martins and Bearman, who had also recovered to the top ten, collided at the restart, ending Bearman's race and earning Martins a penalty. Zane Maloney then passed Crawford for second place but was unable to catch Novalak, who claimed his first Formula 2 victory. The top four drivers in the standings all failed to score points at Zandvoort, leaving Pourchaire's lead at 12 points over Vesti.

=== Round 12: Italy ===
Championship leader Pourchaire took feature race pole at Monza Circuit and Ralph Boschung started first in the sprint race. A first-corner mistake from Boschung allowed third-placed starter Vesti into the lead. The safety car was called shortly afterwards to recover Amaury Cordeel's car after he spun and stalled on track. Victor Martins, who started sixth, made overtakes and took second place from Richard Verschoor before the second safety car was deployed to clear Roy Nissany's stalled car. Martins attacked Vesti at the restart setting a string of fastest laps but Vesti held off the ART driver to claim his fifth win of the season with Verschoor taking third place. Championship leader Théo Pourchaire finished fourth leaving the gap between him and Vesti at nine points.

In the opening lap of the feature race, Oliver Bearman took the lead from pole-sitter Pourchaire, while Vesti was eliminated in a crash after being forced off-track by Roman Staněk. Arthur Leclerc spun and stalled on lap seven, causing another safety car, during which the drivers on the softer tyre compound (all but four) made pit stops. At the restart, contact from Nissany on the pit straight caused Zane Maloney to crash at high-speed, resulting in a third safety car. A collision between Kush Maini and Jak Crawford brought out a fourth safety car with seven laps remaining, allowing the drivers who had not yet made pit stops to do so without disadvantage. One of these drivers, Ayumu Iwasa, emerged in third place and passed Pourchaire for second before the race ended under a fifth safety car when Crawford stopped close to the track. Pourchaire's podium finish and Vesti's retirement meant Pourchaire ended the penultimate round with a 25-point lead in the championship.

=== Round 13: Abu Dhabi ===
Jack Doohan claimed the final pole position of the season at Yas Marina Circuit. This meant that Ayumu Iwasa was eliminated from championship contention whilst remaining contenders Vesti and Pourchaire qualified ninth and 14th respectively. Enzo Fittipaldi started the sprint race from first place and battled for the lead with Vesti, Richard Verschoor and Isack Hadjar on the opening lap. Fittipaldi regained the position and Vesti dropped to fourth place. Vesti later overtook Verschoor and Hadjar and passed Fittipaldi with three laps remaining to claim his sixth victory of the year. Pourchaire gained seven places in the race and scored points, but Vesti's victory closed the gap to 16 points between the two going into the final race.

Doohan led the feature race from pole position as Vesti and Pourchaire gained places before the first round of pit stops. The two drivers ran on alternate tyre strategies; Pourchaire pitted first and Vesti did so later in the race. Vesti emerged from the pits in seventh place behind Pourchaire and the two traded positions a number of times in the following laps. Vesti, with the fresher tyres, ultimately stayed ahead and went on to finish third despite a final-lap collision with Zane Maloney. Doohan won his third race of the season, promoting him to third in the Drivers' Championship in front of Iwasa.

Pourchaire finished fifth, which was enough to win the championship by 11 points over Vesti. He became the first ART Grand Prix driver to win the championship since Nyck de Vries in 2019. The feature race result also allowed ART Grand Prix to clinch their first Teams' Championship title in Formula 2, and their first in the second tier since winning the GP2 Series in 2015.

== Results and standings ==
=== Season summary ===
Round		Circuit	Pole position	Fastest lap	Winning driver	Winning team	Report
1	SR	Bahrain International Circuit		(United Kingdom) Oliver Bearman (Note: Oliver Bearman set the fastest lap but did not finish in the top 10, so was ineligible to score the point for it. Théo Pourchaire scored the point for setting the fastest lap of those finishing in the top 10.)	(Switzerland) Ralph Boschung	(Spain) Campos Racing	Report
1	FR	Bahrain International Circuit	(France) Théo Pourchaire	(Netherlands) Richard Verschoor	(France) Théo Pourchaire	(France) ART Grand Prix	Report
2	SR	(Saudi Arabia) Jeddah Corniche Circuit		(France) Victor Martins	(Japan) Ayumu Iwasa	(France) DAMS	Report
2	FR	(Saudi Arabia) Jeddah Corniche Circuit	(France) Victor Martins	(Monaco) Arthur Leclerc	(Denmark) Frederik Vesti	(Italy) Prema Racing	Report
3	SR	(Australia) Albert Park Circuit		(Norway) Dennis Hauger	(Norway) Dennis Hauger	(Netherlands) MP Motorsport	Report
3	FR	(Australia) Albert Park Circuit	(Japan) Ayumu Iwasa	(Denmark) Frederik Vesti	(Japan) Ayumu Iwasa	(France) DAMS	Report
4	SR	(Azerbaijan) Baku City Circuit		(United Kingdom) Oliver Bearman	(United Kingdom) Oliver Bearman	(Italy) Prema Racing	Report
4	FR	(Azerbaijan) Baku City Circuit	(United Kingdom) Oliver Bearman	(France) Isack Hadjar	(United Kingdom) Oliver Bearman	(Italy) Prema Racing	Report
5	SR	Circuit de Monaco		(Australia) Jack Doohan	(Japan) Ayumu Iwasa	(France) DAMS	Report
5	FR	Circuit de Monaco	(Denmark) Frederik Vesti	(France) Victor Martins	(Denmark) Frederik Vesti	(Italy) Prema Racing	Report
6	SR	(Spain) Circuit de Barcelona-Catalunya		(France) Théo Pourchaire	(Denmark) Frederik Vesti	(Italy) Prema Racing	Report
6	FR	(Spain) Circuit de Barcelona-Catalunya	(United Kingdom) Oliver Bearman	(France) Clément Novalak (Note: Clément Novalak set the fastest lap but did not finish in the top 10, so was ineligible to score the point for it. Frederik Vesti scored the point for setting the fastest lap of those finishing in the top 10.)	(United Kingdom) Oliver Bearman	(Italy) Prema Racing	Report
7	SR	(Austria) Red Bull Ring		(Barbados) Zane Maloney (Note: Zane Maloney set the fastest lap but did not finish in the top 10, so was ineligible to score the point for it. Victor Martins scored the point for setting the fastest lap of those finishing in the top 10.)	(United States) Jak Crawford	(United Kingdom) Hitech Pulse-Eight	Report
7	FR	(Austria) Red Bull Ring	(France) Victor Martins	(Japan) Ayumu Iwasa	(Netherlands) Richard Verschoor	(Netherlands) Van Amersfoort Racing	Report
8	SR	(United Kingdom) Silverstone Circuit		(Japan) Ayumu Iwasa (Note: Ayumu Iwasa set the fastest lap but did not finish in the top 10, so was ineligible to score the point for it. Théo Pourchaire scored the point for setting the fastest lap of those finishing in the top 10.)	(Denmark) Frederik Vesti	(Italy) Prema Racing	Report
8	FR	(United Kingdom) Silverstone Circuit	(France) Victor Martins	(France) Victor Martins	(France) Victor Martins	(France) ART Grand Prix	Report
9	SR	(Hungary) Hungaroring		(Japan) Ayumu Iwasa	(Norway) Dennis Hauger	(Netherlands) MP Motorsport	Report
9	FR	(Hungary) Hungaroring	(Australia) Jack Doohan	(Australia) Jack Doohan	(Australia) Jack Doohan	(United Kingdom) Invicta Virtuosi Racing	Report
10	SR	(Belgium) Circuit de Spa-Francorchamps		(Brazil) Enzo Fittipaldi (Note: Richard Verschoor originally set the fastest lap of the race, but was disqualified for a technical non-conformity. The fastest lap therefore went to Enzo Fittipaldi.)	(Brazil) Enzo Fittipaldi	(United Kingdom) Rodin Carlin	Report
10	FR	(Belgium) Circuit de Spa-Francorchamps	(United Kingdom) Oliver Bearman	(Australia) Jack Doohan	(Australia) Jack Doohan	(United Kingdom) Invicta Virtuosi Racing	Report
11	SR	(Netherlands) Circuit Zandvoort		none awarded (Note: No one was awarded the fastest lap of the race as no lap times were recorded under green flag conditions.)	(France) Isack Hadjar	(United Kingdom) Hitech Pulse-Eight	Report
11	FR	(Netherlands) Circuit Zandvoort	(United States) Jak Crawford	(France) Clément Novalak	(France) Clément Novalak	(Italy) Trident	Report
12	SR	(Italy) Monza Circuit		(France) Victor Martins	(Denmark) Frederik Vesti	(Italy) Prema Racing	Report
12	FR	(Italy) Monza Circuit	(France) Théo Pourchaire	(France) Théo Pourchaire	(United Kingdom) Oliver Bearman	(Italy) Prema Racing	Report
13	SR	(United Arab Emirates) Yas Marina Circuit		(France) Victor Martins (Note: Victor Martins set the fastest lap but did not finish in the top 10, so was ineligible to score the point for it. Frederik Vesti scored the point for setting the fastest lap of those finishing in the top 10.)	(Denmark) Frederik Vesti	(Italy) Prema Racing	Report
13	FR	(United Arab Emirates) Yas Marina Circuit	(Australia) Jack Doohan	(France) Victor Martins	(Australia) Jack Doohan	(United Kingdom) Invicta Virtuosi Racing	Report

=== Scoring system ===
Points were awarded to the top eight classified finishers in the sprint race, and to the top ten classified finishers in the feature race. The pole-sitter in the feature race also received two points, and one point was given to the driver who set the fastest lap in both the feature and sprint races, provided that driver finished inside the top ten. If the driver who set the fastest lap was classified outside the top ten, the point was given to the driver who set the fastest lap of those inside the top ten. No extra points were awarded to the pole-sitter in the sprint race as the grid for it was set by reversing the top ten qualifiers.

Sprint race points

Points were awarded to the top eight classified finishers, excluding the fastest lap point which was given to the top ten classified finishers.

Position	1st	2nd	3rd	4th	5th	6th	7th	8th	FL
Points	10	8	6	5	4	3	2	1	1

Feature race points

Points were awarded to the top ten classified finishers. Bonus points were awarded to the pole-sitter and to the driver who set the fastest lap and finished in the top ten.

Position	1st	2nd	3rd	4th	5th	6th	7th	8th	9th	10th	Pole	FL
Points	25	18	15	12	10	8	6	4	2	1	2	1

=== Drivers' Championship standings ===
Pos.	Driver	BHR (Bahrain)		JED (Saudi Arabia)		ALB (Australia)		BAK (Azerbaijan)		MON (Monaco)		CAT (Spain)		RBR (Austria)		SIL (United Kingdom)		HUN (Hungary)		SPA (Belgium)		ZAN (Netherlands)		MNZ (Italy)		YMC (United Arab Emirates)		Points
Pos.	Driver	SR	FR	SR	FR	SR	FR	SR	FR	SR	FR	SR	FR	SR	FR	SR	FR	SR	FR	SR	FR	SR (Note: As less than 2 full racing laps were completed, no points were awarded.)	FR	SR	FR	SR	FR	Points
1	(France) Théo Pourchaire	5^{F}	1^{P}	Ret	13	18†	2	15†	3	8	2	2^{F}	7	14	7	2^{F}	3	4	6	2	2	19	Ret	4	3^{P}^{F}	7	5	203
2	(Denmark) Frederik Vesti	17	Ret	6	1	8	4^{F}	2	4	9	1^{P}	1	5^{F}	9	3	1	Ret	9	2	6	DNS	7	Ret	1	Ret	1^{F}	3	192
3	(Australia) Jack Doohan	11	16	7	2	Ret	8	17†	15	6^{F}	Ret	5	6	7	4	3	4	10	1^{P}^{F}	5	1^{F}	6	DNS	9	6	6	1^{P}	168
4	(Japan) Ayumu Iwasa	4	8	1	4	13	1^{P}	Ret	12	1	10	8	4	11	2^{F}	21	5	2^{F}	4	7	Ret	13	13	Ret	2	8	4	165
5	(France) Victor Martins	3	Ret	2^{F}	Ret^{P}	15	18	13†	DSQ	7	8^{F}	3	3	2^{F}	9^{P}	7	1^{P}^{F}	7	3	4	5	2	9	2^{F}	Ret	20	2^{F}	150
6	(United Kingdom) Oliver Bearman	15	14	Ret	10	7	17	1^{F}	1^{P}	Ret	11	7	1^{P}	8	5	6	8	3	12	12	7^{P}	3	Ret	6	1	10	Ret	130
7	(Brazil) Enzo Fittipaldi	8	9	13	7	DNS	Ret	5	2	10	Ret	10	2	Ret	6	4	7	11	8	1^{F}	3	15	7	15	4	2	14	124
8	(Norway) Dennis Hauger	2	Ret	8	5	1^{F}	19†	12†	6	15	5	4	8	6	11	12	14	1	7	3	DSQ	9	5	12	5	4	7	113
9	(Netherlands) Richard Verschoor	22†	5^{F}	16	6	10	7	Ret	8	4	4	6	10	Ret	1	18	16	13	10	DSQ	6	12	4	3	13	3	Ret	108
10	(Barbados) Zane Maloney	9	3	Ret	17	5	5	Ret	11	5	3	14	16	18	15	10	2	12	16	10	4	5	2	14	Ret	9	17†	96
11	(India) Kush Maini	7	4	5	12	3	9	4	5	13	6	18	17	16	Ret	13	Ret	6	20	18	8	Ret	18	5	Ret	13	9	62
12	(India) Jehan Daruvala	6	17	3	3	17	6	14†	14	2	13	19†	14	Ret	10	11	6	5	11	Ret	Ret	10	17	17	7			59
13	(United States) Jak Crawford	14	12	9	15	2	Ret	3	9	3	9	Ret	13	1	8	14	10	14	17	14	Ret	Ret	3^{P}	13	16†	12	10	57
14	(France) Isack Hadjar	20	7	12	9	6	15	11	7^{F}	Ret	12	12	20	3	12	5	15	8	5	11	Ret	1	6	11	11	5	8	55
15	(Monaco) Arthur Leclerc	12	6	11	8^{F}	4	3	16†	10	14	Ret	9	9	13	Ret	8	9	15	13	9	11	11	14	7	Ret	21	6	49
16	(Switzerland) Ralph Boschung	1	2	4	19	DNS	16	Ret	20	Ret	Ret	16	15	17	14	20	Ret	Ret	19	8	10	Ret	16	19	9	18	15	37
17	(France) Clément Novalak	16	13	15	16	11	11	7	16	17	17	11	21	DSQ	13	17	12	Ret	Ret	17	13	8	1^{F}	10	Ret			28
18	(Czech Republic) Roman Staněk	13	Ret	17	14	16	14	8	17	12	7	13	12	5	Ret	15	Ret	16	14	15	9	14	11	8	10	11	12	15
19	(United States) Juan Manuel Correa	10	10	14	18	14	10	6	13	16	14	Ret	11	4	18	19	11	20	9	16	16	4	10	18	14	Ret	13	13
20	(Belgium) Amaury Cordeel	21	15	19	20	12	13	9	19	Ret	NC	17	19	15	17	16	Ret	19	21	Ret	15	16	8	Ret	8	17	16	8
21	(Israel) Roy Nissany	18	11	10	11	9	Ret	Ret	18	Ret	15	20†	18	10	16	9	17	17	15	13	12	17	12	Ret	15	14	11	0
22	(United States) Brad Benavides	19	18	18	Ret	Ret	12	10	Ret	11	16	15	22	12	19	Ret	13	18	18									0
23	(United Kingdom) Josh Mason																			19	14	18	15	16	12	15	Ret	0
24	(Estonia) Paul Aron																									16	18	0
25	(Argentina) Franco Colapinto																									19	Ret	0
Pos.	Driver	SR	FR	SR	FR	SR	FR	SR	FR	SR	FR	SR	FR	SR	FR	SR	FR	SR	FR	SR	FR	SR	FR	SR	FR	SR	FR	Points
Pos.	Driver	BHR (Bahrain)		JED (Saudi Arabia)		ALB (Australia)		BAK (Azerbaijan)		MON (Monaco)		CAT (Spain)		RBR (Austria)		SIL (United Kingdom)		HUN (Hungary)		SPA (Belgium)		ZAN (Netherlands)		MNZ (Italy)		YMC (United Arab Emirates)		Points

Key
Colour	Result
Gold	Winner
Silver	Second place
Bronze	Third place
Green	Other points position
Blue	Other classified position
Blue	Not classified, finished (NC)
Purple	Not classified, retired (Ret)
Red	Did not qualify (DNQ)
Black	Disqualified (DSQ)
White	Did not start (DNS)
White	Race cancelled (C)
Blank	Did not practice (DNP)
Blank	Excluded (EX)
Blank	Did not arrive (DNA)
Blank	Withdrawn (WD)
Blank	Did not enter (empty cell)
Annotation	Meaning
P	Pole position
F	Fastest lap

Notes:

- † – Driver did not finish the race, but was classified as he completed more than 90% of the race distance.

=== Teams' Championship standings ===
Pos.	Team	BHR (Bahrain)		JED (Saudi Arabia)		ALB (Australia)		BAK (Azerbaijan)		MON (Monaco)		CAT (Spain)		RBR (Austria)		SIL (United Kingdom)		HUN (Hungary)		SPA (Belgium)		ZAN (Netherlands)		MNZ (Italy)		YMC (United Arab Emirates)		Points
Pos.	Team	SR	FR	SR	FR	SR	FR	SR	FR	SR	FR	SR	FR	SR	FR	SR	FR	SR	FR	SR	FR	SR	FR	SR	FR	SR	FR	Points
1	(France) ART Grand Prix	3	1^{P}	2^{F}	13	15	2	13†	3	7	2	2^{F}	3	2^{F}	7	2^{F}	1^{P F}	4	3	2	2	2	9	2^{F}	3^{P F}	7	2^{F}	353
1	(France) ART Grand Prix	5^{F}	Ret	Ret	Ret^{P}	18†	18	15†	DSQ	8	8^{F}	3	7	14	9^{P}	7	3	7	6	4	5	19	Ret	4	Ret	20	5	353
2	(Italy) Prema Racing	15	14	6	1	7	4^{F}	1^{F}	1^{P}	9	1^{P}	1	1^{P}	8	3	1	8	3	2	6	7^{P}	3	Ret	1	1	1^{F}	3	322
2	(Italy) Prema Racing	17	Ret	Ret	10	8	17	2	4	Ret	11	7	5^{F}	9	5	6	Ret	9	12	12	DNS	7	Ret	6	Ret	10	Ret	322
3	(United Kingdom) Rodin Carlin	8	3	13	7	5	5	5	2	5	3	10	2	18	6	4	2	11	8	1^{F}	3	5	2	14	4	2	14	220
3	(United Kingdom) Rodin Carlin	9	9	Ret	17	DNS	Ret	Ret	11	10	Ret	14	16	Ret	15	10	7	12	16	10	4	15	7	15	Ret	9	17†	220
4	(France) DAMS	4	6	1	4	4	1^{P}	16†	10	1	10	8	4	11	2^{F}	8	5	2^{F}	4	7	11	11	13	7	2	8	4	214
4	(France) DAMS	12	8	11	8^{F}	13	3	Ret	12	14	Ret	9	9	13	Ret	21	9	15	13	9	Ret	13	14	Ret	Ret	21	6	214
5	(United Kingdom) Invicta Virtuosi Racing	11	15	7	2	12	8	9	15	6^{F}	NC	5	6	7	4	3	4	10	1^{P F}	5	1^{F}	6	8	9	6	6	1^{P}	176
5	(United Kingdom) Invicta Virtuosi Racing	21	16	19	20	Ret	13	17†	19	Ret	Ret	17	19	15	17	16	Ret	19	21	Ret	15	16	DNS	Ret	8	17	16	176
6	(Netherlands) MP Motorsport	2	17	3	3	1^{F}	6	12†	6	2	5	4	8	6	10	11	6	1	7	3	Ret	9	5	12	5	4	7	172
6	(Netherlands) MP Motorsport	6	Ret	8	5	17	19†	14†	14	15	13	19†	14	Ret	11	12	14	5	11	Ret	DSQ	10	17	17	7	19	Ret	172
7	(Netherlands) Van Amersfoort Racing	10	5^{F}	14	6	10	7	6	8	4	4	6	10	4	1	18	11	13	9	16	6	4	4	3	13	3	13	121
7	(Netherlands) Van Amersfoort Racing	22†	10	16	18	14	10	Ret	13	16	14	Ret	11	Ret	18	19	16	20	10	DSQ	16	12	10	18	14	Ret	Ret	121
8	(United Kingdom) Hitech Pulse-Eight	14	7	9	9	2	15	3	7^{F}	3	9	12	13	1	8	5	10	8	5	11	Ret	1	3^{P}	11	11	5	8	112
8	(United Kingdom) Hitech Pulse-Eight	20	12	12	15	6	Ret	11	9	Ret	12	Ret	20	3	12	14	15	14	17	14	Ret	Ret	6	13	16†	12	10	112
9	(Spain) Campos Racing	1	2	4	12	3	9	4	5	13	6	16	15	16	14	13	Ret	6	19	8	8	Ret	16	5	9	13	9	99
9	(Spain) Campos Racing	7	4	5	19	DNS	16	Ret	20	Ret	Ret	18	17	17	Ret	20	Ret	Ret	20	18	10	Ret	18	19	Ret	18	15	99
10	(Italy) Trident	13	13	15	14	11	11	7	16	12	7	11	12	5	13	15	12	16	14	15	9	8	1^{F}	8	10	11	12	43
10	(Italy) Trident	16	Ret	17	16	16	14	8	17	17	17	13	21	DSQ	Ret	17	Ret	Ret	Ret	17	13	14	11	10	Ret	16	18	43
11	(Germany) PHM Racing by Charouz (1–12) (Germany) PHM Racing (13)	18	11	10	11	9	12	10	18	11	15	15	18	10	16	9	13	17	15	13	12	17	12	16	12	14	11	0
11	(Germany) PHM Racing by Charouz (1–12) (Germany) PHM Racing (13)	19	18	18	Ret	Ret	Ret	Ret	Ret	Ret	16	20†	22	12	19	Ret	17	18	18	19	14	18	15	Ret	15	15	Ret	0
Pos.	Team	SR	FR	SR	FR	SR	FR	SR	FR	SR	FR	SR	FR	SR	FR	SR	FR	SR	FR	SR	FR	SR	FR	SR	FR	SR	FR	Points
Pos.	Team	BHR (Bahrain)		JED (Saudi Arabia)		ALB (Australia)		BAK (Azerbaijan)		MON (Monaco)		CAT (Spain)		RBR (Austria)		SIL (United Kingdom)		HUN (Hungary)		SPA (Belgium)		ZAN (Netherlands)		MNZ (Italy)		YMC (United Arab Emirates)		Points

Key
Colour	Result
Gold	Winner
Silver	Second place
Bronze	Third place
Green	Other points position
Blue	Other classified position
Blue	Not classified, finished (NC)
Purple	Not classified, retired (Ret)
Red	Did not qualify (DNQ)
Black	Disqualified (DSQ)
White	Did not start (DNS)
White	Race cancelled (C)
Blank	Did not practice (DNP)
Blank	Excluded (EX)
Blank	Did not arrive (DNA)
Blank	Withdrawn (WD)
Blank	Did not enter (empty cell)
Annotation	Meaning
P	Pole position
F	Fastest lap

Notes:

- † – Driver did not finish the race, but was classified as he completed more than 90% of the race distance.
- Rows are not related to the drivers: within each team, individual race standings are sorted purely based on the final classification in the race (not by total points scored in the event, which includes points awarded for fastest lap and pole position).
