= PHM Racing =

German auto racing team

(Germany) PHM Racing
- Founded: 2021
- Base: Berlin, Germany
- Team principal(s): Paul Müller
- Founder(s): Paul Müller
- Current series: Euro 4 Championship; Italian F4 Championship; UAE4 Series
- Former series: FIA Formula 2 Championship; FIA Formula 3 Championship; Formula Regional Middle East Championship; ADAC Formula 4 Formula 4 CEZ Championship
- Current drivers: UAE4 Series (Italy) Iacopo Martinese (Estonia) Roland Kuklane (Austria) Emma Felbermayr (Canada) Alexander Chartier; Italian F4 Championship (New Zealand) Oscar Repetto (Kyrgyzstan) Platon Kostin (Latvia) Tomass Štolcermanis (Austria) Emma Felbermayr
- Website: http://phm.racing/

PHM Racing is a German auto racing team competing in a variety of junior open-wheel series. It started racing in 2022 after taking over Mücke Motorsport's Formula 4 assets and later entered Formula Regional, FIA Formula 3 and FIA Formula 2, the latter two initially in collaboration with Charouz. The F2 and F3 operations were bought out by financial services firm AIX Investment Group and became AIX Racing in May 2024.

== History ==
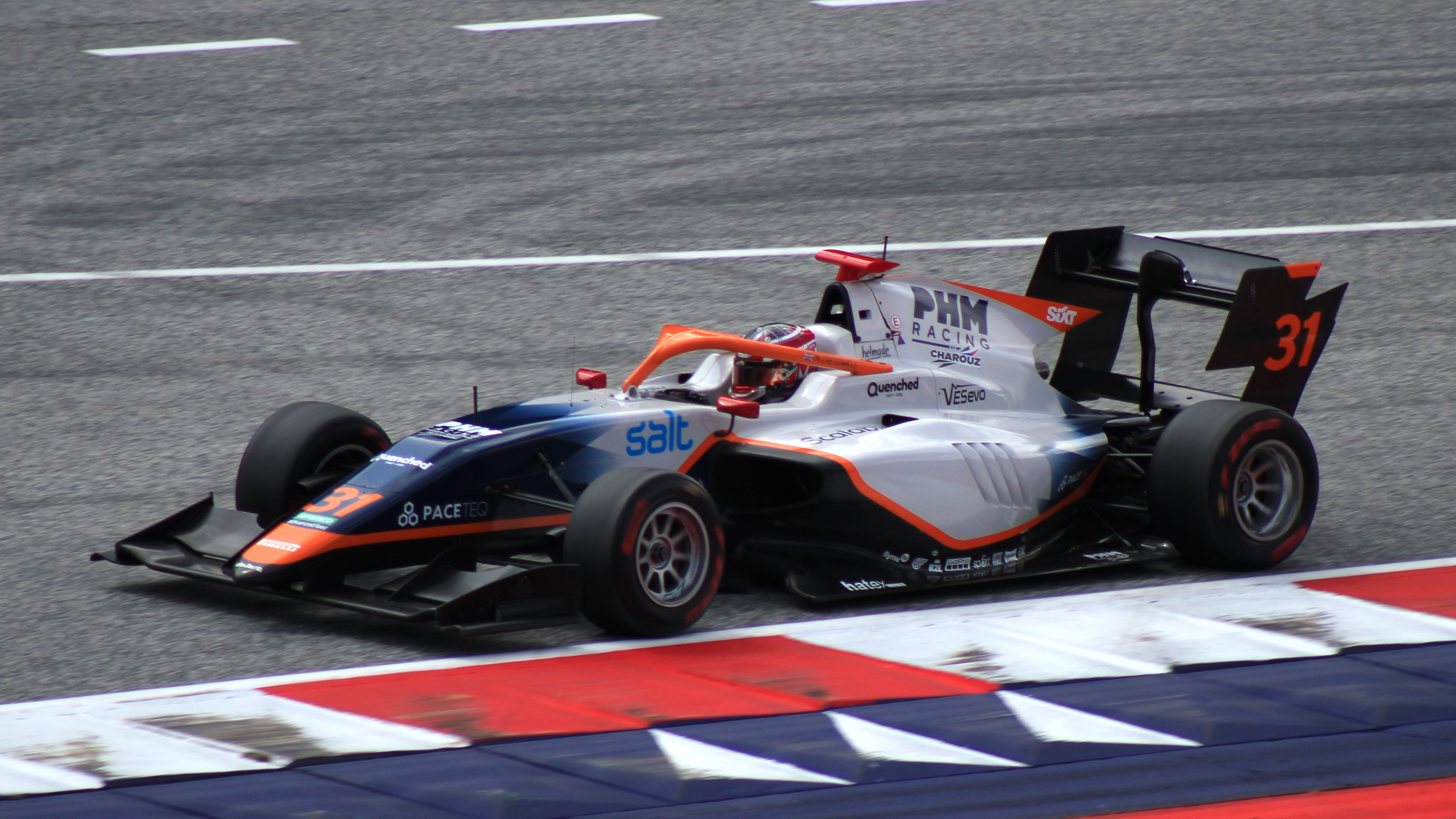
McKenzy Cresswell driving a PHM Racing FIA Formula 3 car at the Red Bull Ring (2023)

Born from the ashes of Mücke Motorsport's single-seater programme, which was disbanded at the end of 2021, PHM Racing was founded by Paul Müller with a squad mostly consisting of former Mücke personnel and the aim of being a non-profit organization. The team made its first step into racing in the Formula 4 UAE Championship in 2022, competing with Nikita Bedrin, Jonas Ried and Taylor Barnard. Following a campaign that yielded the team's first ever race win with Barnard and a further pair of victories brought by Bedrin, team owner Paul Müller announced that they would be stepping into the Italian and German F4 series.

The team entered Formula Regional Middle East for the 2023 winter season, before expanding into Formula 2 and FIA Formula 3 with a partial takeover of Charouz Racing System under the PHM Racing by Charouz moniker. PHM assumed full control of the F2 and F3 teams' operations prior to the 2023 Yas Island Formula 2 round, and announced a new sponsorship deal with the Dubai-based AIX Investment Group that would see the team renamed PHM AIX Racing for 2024. AIX Investment Group later completed acquisition of the F2 and F3 structures and became AIX Racing in May 2024. The Formula Regional and F4 outfits reverted to the PHM Racing name in October 2024 in the wake of the AIX sponsorship deal ending.

== Current series results ==
=== Italian F4 Championship ===
Year	Car	Drivers	Races	Wins	Poles	F.L.	Points	D.C.	T.C.
2022	Tatuus F4-T421	(United Kingdom) Taylor Barnard	20	0	0	0	103	8th	3rd
2022	Tatuus F4-T421	(Italy) Nikita Bedrin	20	0	0	0	77	12th	3rd
2022	Tatuus F4-T421	(Germany) Jonas Ried	20	0	0	0	1	25th	3rd
2022	Tatuus F4-T421	(Russia) Victoria Blokhina	20	0	0	0	0	34th	3rd
2023	Tatuus F4-T421	(Italy) James Egozi	21	0	0	0	37	14th	4th
2023	Tatuus F4-T421	(Germany) Valentin Kluss	15	0	0	0	34	15th	4th
2023	Tatuus F4-T421	(Thailand) Nandhavud Bhirombhakdi	18	0	0	0	8	21st	4th
2023	Tatuus F4-T421	(Italy) Davide Larini†	15	0	0	0	0	32nd	4th
2023	Tatuus F4-T421	(Russia) Victoria Blokhina	20	0	0	0	0	35th	4th
2023	Tatuus F4-T421	(Italy) Giacomo Pedrini	6	0	0	0	0	42nd	4th
2023	Tatuus F4-T421	(Germany) Tom Kalender	3	0	0	0	0	49th	4th
2024	Tatuus F4-T421	(Italy) Maksimilian Popov	21	0	0	0	9	21st	5th (Note: Entered as PHM AIX Racing.)
2024	Tatuus F4-T421	(Italy) Davide Larini	21	0	0	0	8	22nd	5th
2024	Tatuus F4-T421	(Serbia) Andrej Petrović	12	0	0	0	1	26th	5th
2024	Tatuus F4-T421	(United States) Everett Stack	20	0	0	0	1	27th	5th
2024	Tatuus F4-T421	(Australia) Kamal Mrad	15	0	0	0	0	40th	5th
2025	Tatuus F4-T421	(Netherlands) Reno Francot	9	0	0	0	47	12th	6th
2025	Tatuus F4-T421	(Italy) Andrea Dupé‡	17	0	0	0	20	22nd	6th
2025	Tatuus F4-T421	(Romania) David Cosma Cristofor	20	0	2	0	7	26th	6th
2026	Tatuus F4-T421	(New Zealand) Oscar Repetto							
2026	Tatuus F4-T421	(Italy) Iacopo Martinese							
2026	Tatuus F4-T421	(Estonia) Roland Kuklane							
2026	Tatuus F4-T421	(Austria) Emma Felbermayr							
2026	Tatuus F4-T421	(Canada) Alexander Chartier							

† Larini drove for AKM Motorsport until round 4.

‡ Dupé drove for Prema Racing from round 4 onwards.

=== Euro 4 Championship ===
Year	Car	Drivers	Races	Wins	Poles	F.L.	Points	D.C.	T.C.
2023	Tatuus F4-T421	(Thailand) Nandhavud Bhirombhakdi	6	0	0	0	0	21st	7th
2023	Tatuus F4-T421	(Italy) Giacomo Pedrini†	6	0	0	0	0	28th	7th
2024	Tatuus F4-T421	(Italy) Davide Larini	9	0	1	1	29	12th	4th
2024	Tatuus F4-T421	(Italy) Maksimilian Popov	9	0	0	0	4	21st	4th
2024	Tatuus F4-T421	(Brazil) Gabriel Gomez	3	0	0	0	0	26th	4th
2024	Tatuus F4-T421	(United States) Everett Stack	9	0	0	0	0	30th	4th
2025	Tatuus F4-T421	(Netherlands) Reno Francot	9	1	0	1	108	3rd	3rd

† Pedrini drove for Van Amersfoort Racing in round 3.

=== Formula 4 UAE Championship / F4 Middle East Championship / UAE4 Series ===
Year	Car	Drivers	Races	Wins	Poles	F.L.	Points	D.C.	T.C.
2022	Tatuus F4-T421	(Italy) Nikita Bedrin	19	2	1	1	198	4th	3rd
2022	Tatuus F4-T421	(United Kingdom) Taylor Barnard	20	1	0	0	80	9th	3rd
2022	Tatuus F4-T421	(Germany) Jonas Ried	20	0	0	0	4	23rd	3rd
2023	Tatuus F4-T421	(Denmark) Noah Strømsted	15	0	0	0	55	9th	5th
2023	Tatuus F4-T421	(Germany) Valentin Kluss	15	0	0	0	50	10th	5th
2023	Tatuus F4-T421	(United Kingdom) Akshay Bohra	15	0	0	0	11	21st	5th
2023	Tatuus F4-T421	(Thailand) Nandhavud Bhirombhakdi	6	0	0	0	0	31st	5th
2023	Tatuus F4-T421	(Germany) Jakob Bergmeister	9	0	0	0	0	40th	5th
2024	Tatuus F4-T421	(Italy) Nikita Bedrin	9	3	2	0	124	5th	5th
2024	Tatuus F4-T421	(Italy) Maksimilian Popov	15	0	0	0	0	27th	5th
2024	Tatuus F4-T421	(Australia) Kamal Mrad	15	0	0	0	0	28th	5th
2024	Tatuus F4-T421	(Italy) Davide Larini	6	0	0	0	0	30th	5th
2024	Tatuus F4-T421	(United States) Everett Stack	15	0	0	0	0	34th	5th
2025	Tatuus F4-T421	(Netherlands) Reno Francot	15	1	0	0	187	5th	3rd
2025	Tatuus F4-T421	(Romania) David Cosma Cristofor	15	0	0	0	6	17th	3rd
2025	Tatuus F4-T421	(Japan) Yuta Suzuki†	12	0	0	0	2	22nd	3rd
2025	Tatuus F4-T421	(South Africa) Aqil Alibhai	3	0	0	0	0	24th	3rd
2025	Tatuus F4-T421	(United Arab Emirates) Hamda Al Qubaisi	2	0	0	0	0	31st	3rd
2026	Tatuus F4-T421	(Italy) Iacopo Martinese	12	0	0	0	46	9th	5th
2026	Tatuus F4-T421	(Latvia) Tomass Štolcermanis	3	0	0	0	20	17th	5th
2026	Tatuus F4-T421	(Kyrgyzstan) Platon Kostin	12	0	0	0	0	23rd	5th
2026	Tatuus F4-T421	(Austria) Emma Felbermayr	9	0	0	0	0	26th	5th

† Suzuki drove for Pinnacle Motorsport until round 2.

== Former series results ==
=== FIA Formula 2 Championship ===
Year	Chassis	Engine	Tyres	Drivers	Races	Wins	Poles	F. Laps	Podiums	D.C.	Pts	T.C.	Pts
2023	Dallara; F2 2018	Mecachrome; V634T V6 t	P	(Israel) Roy Nissany	26	0	0	0	0	21st	0	11th (Note: Entered as PHM Racing by Charouz.)	0
2023	Dallara; F2 2018	Mecachrome; V634T V6 t	P	(United States) Brad Benavides	18	0	0	0	0	22nd	0	11th	0
2023	Dallara; F2 2018	Mecachrome; V634T V6 t	P	(United Kingdom) Josh Mason	8	0	0	0	0	23rd	0	11th	0
2024	Dallara; F2 2024	Mecachrome; V634T V6 t	P	(Paraguay) Joshua Dürksen	28	2	0	0	4	10th	87	9th (Note: Taken over by AIX Racing after round three.)	105
2024	Dallara; F2 2024	Mecachrome; V634T V6 t	P	(United Kingdom) Taylor Barnard	20	1	0	0	1	21st	18	9th	105
2024	Dallara; F2 2024	Mecachrome; V634T V6 t	P	(Netherlands) Niels Koolen	4	0	0	0	0	32nd	0	9th	105
2024	Dallara; F2 2024	Mecachrome; V634T V6 t	P	(United Kingdom) Cian Shields	4	0	0	0	0	30th	0	9th	105

==== In detail ====
(key) (Races in bold indicate pole position) (Races in italics indicate fastest lap)

Year	Drivers	1	2	3	4	5	6	7	8	9	10	11	12	13	14	15	16	17	18	19	20	21	22	23	24	25	26	27	28	T.C.	Points
2023		BHR; SPR	BHR; FEA	JED; SPR	JED; FEA	ALB; SPR	ALB; FEA	BAK; SPR	BAK; FEA	MCO; SPR	MCO; FEA	CAT; SPR	CAT; FEA	RBR; SPR	RBR; FEA	SIL; SPR	SIL; FEA	HUN; SPR	HUN; FEA	SPA; SPR	SPA; FEA	ZAN; SPR	ZAN; FEA	MNZ; SPR	MNZ; FEA	YMC; SPR	YMC; FEA			11th	0
2023	(Israel) Roy Nissany	18	11	10	11	9	Ret	Ret	18	Ret	15	20†	18	10	16	9	17	17	15	13	12	17	12	Ret	15	14	11			11th	0
2023	(United States) Brad Benavides	19	18	18	Ret	Ret	12	10	Ret	11	16	15	22	12	19	Ret	13	18	18											11th	0
2023	(United Kingdom) Josh Mason																			19	14	18	15	16	12	15	Ret			11th	0
2024		BHR; SPR	BHR; FEA	JED; SPR	JED; FEA	ALB; SPR	ALB; FEA	IMO; SPR	IMO; FEA	MCO; SPR	MCO; FEA	CAT; SPR	CAT; FEA	RBR; SPR	RBR; FEA	SIL; SPR	SIL; FEA	HUN; SPR	HUN; FEA	SPA; SPR	SPA; FEA	MNZ; SPR	MNZ; FEA	BAK; SPR	BAK; FEA	LUS; SPR	LUS; FEA	YMC; SPR	YMC; FEA	9th	105
2024	(Paraguay) Joshua Dürksen	15	11	9	12	17	Ret	Ret	3	18	18†	10	Ret	8	6	16	Ret	18	19	19	10	3	5	1	5	8	13	Ret	1	9th	105
2024	(United Kingdom) Taylor Barnard	Ret	16	13	13	13	16	DSQ	20	1	11	19	Ret	12	8	9	14	7	9	16	13									9th	105
2024	(Netherlands) Niels Koolen																					19	19	20	Ret					9th	105
2024	(United Kingdom) Cian Shields																									18	11	18	18	9th	105

=== FIA Formula 3 Championship ===
Year	Chassis	Engine	Tyres	Drivers	Races	Wins	Poles	F. Laps	Podiums	D.C.	Pts	T.C.	Pts
2023	Dallara; F3 2019	Mecachrome; V634 V6	P	(Germany) Sophia Flörsch	18	0	0	0	0	23rd	6	9th	6
2023	Dallara; F3 2019	Mecachrome; V634 V6	P	(Brazil) Roberto Faria	18	0	0	0	0	31st	0	9th	6
2023	Dallara; F3 2019	Mecachrome; V634 V6	P	(Poland) Piotr Wiśnicki	8	0	0	0	0	34th	0	9th	6
2023	Dallara; F3 2019	Mecachrome; V634 V6	P	(United Kingdom) McKenzy Cresswell	4	0	0	0	0	33rd	0	9th	6
2023	Dallara; F3 2019	Mecachrome; V634 V6	P	(South Korea) Michael Shin	6	0	0	0	0	32nd	0	9th	6
2024	Dallara; F3 2019	Mecachrome; V634 V6	P	(Thailand) Tasanapol Inthraphuvasak	20	0	0	0	1	24th	9	9th (Note: Taken over by AIX Racing after round two.)	35
2024	Dallara; F3 2019	Mecachrome; V634 V6	P	(Italy) Nikita Bedrin	20	1	0	0	1	19th	25	9th	35
2024	Dallara; F3 2019	Mecachrome; V634 V6	P	(Austria) Joshua Dufek	20	0	0	0	0	28th	1	9th	35

==== In detail ====
(key) (Races in bold indicate pole position) (Races in italics indicate fastest lap)

Year	Drivers	1	2	3	4	5	6	7	8	9	10	11	12	13	14	15	16	17	18	19	20	T.C.	Points
2023		BHR; SPR	BHR; FEA	ALB; SPR	ALB; FEA	MCO; SPR	MCO; FEA	CAT; SPR	CAT; FEA	RBR; SPR	RBR; FEA	SIL; SPR	SIL; FEA	HUN; SPR	HUN; FEA	SPA; SPR	SPA; FEA	MNZ; SPR	MNZ; FEA			9th	6
2023	(Germany) Sophia Flörsch	22	20	16	18	23	23	21	20	18	DSQ	19	23	15	18	12	7	16	13			9th	6
2023	(Brazil) Roberto Faria	24	25	18	Ret	Ret	27	25	24	24	19	27	Ret	19	20	17	Ret	NC	22†			9th	6
2023	(Poland) Piotr Wiśnicki	25	24	23	Ret	18	22	24	21													9th	6
2023	(United Kingdom) McKenzy Cresswell									23	17	23	22									9th	6
2023	(South Korea) Michael Shin													26	28	21	25	Ret	17			9th	6
2024		BHR; SPR	BHR; FEA	ALB; SPR	ALB; FEA	IMO; SPR	IMO; FEA	MCO; SPR	MCO; FEA	CAT; SPR	CAT; FEA	RBR; SPR	RBR; FEA	SIL; SPR	SIL; FEA	HUN; SPR	HUN; FEA	SPA; SPR	SPA; FEA	MNZ; SPR	MNZ; FEA	9th	35
2024	(Thailand) Tasanapol Inthraphuvasak	16	19	Ret	Ret	Ret	27	17	18	25	26	27	26	20	20	2	14	29	15	21	11	9th	35
2024	(Italy) Nikita Bedrin	13	20	21	8	9	30	Ret	24	Ret	30†	13	Ret	13	9	1	7	13	20	Ret	13	9th	35
2024	(Austria) Joshua Dufek	24	27	22	22	16	22	Ret	20	17	17	25	Ret	23	Ret	22	22	24	14	Ret	10	9th	35

=== ADAC Formula 4 Championship ===
Year	Car	Drivers	Races	Wins	Poles	F.L.	Points	D.C.	T.C.
2022	Tatuus F4-T421	(United Kingdom) Taylor Barnard	18	5	3	3	266	**2nd**	**2nd**
2022	Tatuus F4-T421	(Italy) Nikita Bedrin	18	1	0	1	175	4th	**2nd**
2022	Tatuus F4-T421	(Germany) Jonas Ried	18	0	0	1	71	9th	**2nd**
2022	Tatuus F4-T421	(Germany) Valentin Kluss	12	0	0	0	61	11th	**2nd**

=== Formula 4 CEZ Championship ===
Year	Car	Drivers	Races	Wins	Poles	F.L.	Points	D.C.	T.C.
2023	Tatuus F4-T421	(United States) James Egozi	2	2	1	2	50	8th	5th
2023	Tatuus F4-T421	(Thailand) Nandhavud Bhirombhakdi	2	0	0	0	24	14th	5th
2024	Tatuus F4-T421	(Italy) Davide Larini	3	0	0	0	51	9th	4th
2024	Tatuus F4-T421	(Australia) Kamal Mrad	3	1	1	1	46	10th	4th
2024	Tatuus F4-T421	(Italy) Maksimilian Popov	3	1	0	0	46	11th	4th
2024	Tatuus F4-T421	(Serbia) Andrej Petrović	3	1	0	2	43	12th	4th
2024	Tatuus F4-T421	(United States) Everett Stack	3	0	0	0	0	30th	4th

=== Formula Regional Middle East Championship ===
Year	Car	Drivers	Races	Wins	Poles	F.L.	Points	D.C.	T.C.
2023	Tatuus F3 T-318	(United Kingdom) Taylor Barnard	15	2	0	3	152	**2nd**	**2nd**
2023	Tatuus F3 T-318	(Switzerland) Joshua Dufek	15	0	0	3	105	6th	**2nd**
2023	Tatuus F3 T-318	(Italy) Nikita Bedrin	15	2	2	0	78	8th	**2nd**
2024	Tatuus F3 T-318	(United Kingdom) Taylor Barnard	15	5	4	1	176	**2nd**	**2nd**
2024	Tatuus F3 T-318	(Thailand) Tasanapol Inthraphuvasak	15	0	0	2	86	9th	**2nd**
2024	Tatuus F3 T-318	(Italy) Brando Badoer	15	0	0	0	76	10th	**2nd**
2024	Tatuus F3 T-318	(China) Ruiqi Liu	15	0	0	0	0	26th	**2nd**
2025	Tatuus F3 T-318	(Italy) Brando Badoer	15	1	0	0	156	4th	5th
2025	Tatuus F3 T-318	(United States) Everett Stack	15	0	0	0	0	27th	5th
2025	Tatuus F3 T-318	(United Kingdom) Aditya Kulkarni	12	0	0	0	4	21st	9th (Note: Entered as AKCEL GP.)
2025	Tatuus F3 T-318	(United Kingdom) James Hedley	6	0	0	0	0	25th	9th
2025	Tatuus F3 T-318	(India) Jaden Pariat	6	0	0	0	0	30th	9th

== Timeline ==
Current series
Italian F4 Championship	2022–present
UAE4 Series	2022–present
Euro 4 Championship	2023–present
Former series
ADAC Formula 4	2022
FIA Formula 2 Championship	2023–2024
FIA Formula 3 Championship	2023–2024
Formula 4 CEZ Championship	2023–2024
Formula Regional Middle East Championship	2023–2025
