= 2023 Melbourne Formula 2 round =

Motor racing event

(Australia) 2023 Melbourne Formula 2 round
Round details
- Round 3 of 13 in the 2023 FIA Formula 2 Championship.
- Location: Albert Park Circuit; Melbourne, Australia
- Course: Temporary street circuit 5.278 km (3.280 mi)

Sprint Race
- Date: 1 April 2023
- Laps: 22 (Note: The Sprint Race was scheduled to be run for 23 laps, but was shortened to 22 laps due to the maximum race time being reached after multiple Safety Car periods.)
Podium
First	(Norway) Dennis Hauger	MP Motorsport
Second	(United States) Jak Crawford	Hitech Pulse-Eight
Third	(India) Kush Maini	Campos Racing
Fastest lap
Driver	(Norway) Dennis Hauger	MP Motorsport
- Time: 1:31.267 (on lap 13)

Feature Race
- Date: 2 April 2023
- Laps: 33
Pole position
Driver	(Japan) Ayumu Iwasa	DAMS
Time	1:45.118	
Podium
First	(Japan) Ayumu Iwasa	DAMS
Second	(France) Théo Pourchaire	ART Grand Prix
Third	(Monaco) Arthur Leclerc	DAMS
Fastest lap
Driver	(Denmark) Frederik Vesti	Prema Racing
- Time: 1:30.712 (on lap 32)

The 2023 Melbourne FIA Formula 2 round was a motor racing event held between 31 March and 2 April 2023 at the Albert Park Circuit. It was the third round of the 2023 FIA Formula 2 Championship and was held in support of the 2023 Australian Grand Prix.

== Classification ==
=== Qualifying ===
Pos.	No.	Driver	Entrant	Time/Gap	Grid SR	Grid FR
1	11	(Japan) Ayumu Iwasa	DAMS	1:45.118	9	1
2	5	(France) Théo Pourchaire	ART Grand Prix	+0.614	8	2
3	6	(France) Victor Martins	ART Grand Prix	+0.618	7	3
4	10	(France) Isack Hadjar	Hitech Pulse-Eight	+0.919	10^{1}	4
5	3	(Barbados) Zane Maloney	Rodin Carlin	+0.927	6	5
6	8	(United Kingdom) Oliver Bearman	Prema Racing	+0.940	5	6
7	12	(Monaco) Arthur Leclerc	DAMS	+1.191	4	7
8	24	(India) Kush Maini	Campos Racing	+1.412	3	8
9	9	(United States) Jak Crawford	Hitech Pulse-Eight	+1.569	2	9
10	1	(Norway) Dennis Hauger	MP Motorsport	+1.619	1	10
11	25	(Switzerland) Ralph Boschung	Campos Racing	+1.741	11	11
12	2	(India) Jehan Daruvala	MP Motorsport	+1.778	12	12
13	7	(Denmark) Frederik Vesti	Prema Racing	+1.781	13	13
14	16	(Israel) Roy Nissany	PHM Racing by Charouz	+2.076	14	14
15	14	(Australia) Jack Doohan	Invicta Virtuosi Racing	+2.148	15	15
16	4	(Brazil) Enzo Fittipaldi	Rodin Carlin	+2.149	16	16
17	20	(Czech Republic) Roman Staněk	Trident	+2.352	17	17
18	22	(Netherlands) Richard Verschoor	Van Amersfoort Racing	+2.415	18	18
19	21	(France) Clément Novalak	Trident	+2.460	19	19
20	23	(United States) Juan Manuel Correa	Van Amersfoort Racing	+2.871	20	20
21	15	(Belgium) Amaury Cordeel	Invicta Virtuosi Racing	+3.080	21	21
22	17	(United States) Brad Benavides	PHM Racing by Charouz	+5.004	22	22
107% time: 1:52.476 (+7.358)

Notes:

- ^1 – Isack Hadjar received a three-place grid drop for Saturday's Sprint Race for impeding Roman Staněk during Qualifying.

=== Sprint race ===
Pos.	No.	Driver	Entrant	Laps	Time/Retired	Grid	Points
1	1	(Norway) Dennis Hauger	MP Motorsport	22	40:03.429	1	10 (1)
2	9	(United States) Jak Crawford	Hitech Pulse-Eight	22	+1.120	2	8
3	24	(India) Kush Maini	Campos Racing	22	+1.716	3	6
4	12	(Monaco) Arthur Leclerc	DAMS	22	+2.064	4	5
5	3	(Barbados) Zane Maloney	Rodin Carlin	22	+2.447	6	4
6	10	(France) Isack Hadjar	Hitech Pulse-Eight	22	+2.842	10	3
7	8	(United Kingdom) Oliver Bearman	Prema Racing	22	+4.858	5	2
8	7	(Denmark) Frederik Vesti	Prema Racing	22	+5.299	13	1
9	16	(Israel) Roy Nissany	PHM Racing by Charouz	22	+5.591	14	
10	22	(Netherlands) Richard Verschoor	Van Amersfoort Racing	22	+5.759	18	
11	21	(France) Clément Novalak	Trident	22	+6.417	19	
12	15	(Belgium) Amaury Cordeel	Invicta Virtuosi Racing	22	+11.851	21	
13	11	(Japan) Ayumu Iwasa	DAMS	22	+12.395	9	
14	23	(United States) Juan Manuel Correa	Van Amersfoort Racing	22	+16.816	20	
15	6	(France) Victor Martins	ART Grand Prix	22	+36.640	7	
16	20	(Czech Republic) Roman Staněk	Trident	22	+37.222	17	
17	2	(India) Jehan Daruvala	MP Motorsport	22	+41.076	12	
18^{1}	5	(France) Théo Pourchaire	ART Grand Prix	20	Retired	8	
DNF	17	(United States) Brad Benavides	PHM Racing by Charouz	16	Crash	22	
DNF	14	(Australia) Jack Doohan	Invicta Virtuosi Racing	13	Spun off	15	
DNS	25	(Switzerland) Ralph Boschung	Campos Racing	–	Did not start^{2}	11	
DNS	4	(Brazil) Enzo Fittipaldi	Rodin Carlin	–	Did not start^{2}	16	
Fastest lap set by (Norway) Dennis Hauger: 1:31.267 (lap 13)

Notes:

- ^1 – Théo Pourchaire retired from the race, but was classified as he completed over 90% of the race distance.
- ^2 – Ralph Boschung and Enzo Fittipaldi both had spun off on their way to the grid prior to the race. As a consequence, both were not able to take part in the Sprint Race.

=== Feature Race ===
Pos.	No.	Driver	Entrant	Laps	Time/Retired	Grid	Points
1	11	(Japan) Ayumu Iwasa	DAMS	33	1:00:30.247	1	25 (2)
2	5	(France) Théo Pourchaire	ART Grand Prix	33	+0.882	2	18
3	12	(Monaco) Arthur Leclerc	DAMS	33	+1.484	7	15
4	7	(Denmark) Frederik Vesti	Prema Racing	33	+1.815	13	12 (1)
5	3	(Barbados) Zane Maloney	Rodin Carlin	33	+5.290	5	10
6	2	(India) Jehan Daruvala	MP Motorsport	33	+6.779	12	8
7	22	(Netherlands) Richard Verschoor	Van Amersfoort Racing	33	+7.107	18	6
8	14	(Australia) Jack Doohan	Invicta Virtuosi Racing	33	+7.764	15	4
9	24	(India) Kush Maini	Campos Racing	33	+8.294	8	2
10	23	(United States) Juan Manuel Correa	Van Amersfoort Racing	33	+11.126	20	1
11	21	(France) Clément Novalak	Trident	33	+11.593	19	
12	17	(United States) Brad Benavides	PHM Racing by Charouz	33	+13.902	22	
13	15	(Belgium) Amaury Cordeel	Invicta Virtuosi Racing	33	+14.276	21	
14	20	(Czech Republic) Roman Staněk	Trident	33	+15.890^{1}	17	
15	10	(France) Isack Hadjar	Hitech Pulse-Eight	33	+17.437	4	
16	25	(Switzerland) Ralph Boschung	Campos Racing	33	+24.039	11	
17	8	(United Kingdom) Oliver Bearman	Prema Racing	33	+26.734^{2}	6	
18	6	(France) Victor Martins	ART Grand Prix	33	+27.299^{3}	3	
19^{4}	1	(Norway) Dennis Hauger	MP Motorsport	30	Collision damage	10	
DNF	4	(Brazil) Enzo Fittipaldi	Rodin Carlin	26	Accident	16	
DNF	16	(Israel) Roy Nissany	PHM Racing by Charouz	25	Accident	14	
DNF	9	(United States) Jak Crawford	Hitech Pulse-Eight	6	Collision damage	9	
Fastest lap set by (Denmark) Frederik Vesti: 1:30.712 (lap 32)

Notes:

- ^1 – Roman Staněk originally finished tenth, but was later given a five-second time-penalty for overtaking Kush Maini under Safety Car conditions, dropping him out of the points to fourteenth.
- ^2 – Oliver Bearman received a ten-second time-penalty for failing to serve a five-second time-penalty correctly.
- ^3 – Victor Martins received a ten-second time-penalty for causing a collision with Dennis Hauger.
- ^4 – Dennis Hauger retired from the race, but was classified as he completed over 90% of the race distance.

== Standings after the event ==
Drivers' Championship standings

	Pos.	Driver	Points
2	1	(Japan) Ayumu Iwasa	58
	2	(France) Théo Pourchaire	50
1	3	(Denmark) Frederik Vesti	42
3	4	(Switzerland) Ralph Boschung	33
7	5	(Monaco) Arthur Leclerc	33

Teams' Championship standings

	Pos.	Team	Points
2	1	(France) DAMS	91
	2	(France) ART Grand Prix	67
1	3	(Netherlands) MP Motorsport	62
3	4	(Spain) Campos Racing	59
	5	(Italy) Prema Racing	45

- Note: Only the top five positions are included for both sets of standings.

== See also ==
- 2023 Australian Grand Prix
- 2023 Melbourne Formula 3 round

== Notes ==
Previous round: 2023 Jeddah Formula 2 round	FIA Formula 2 Championship; 2023 season	Next round: 2023 Baku Formula 2 round
Previous round: None	Melbourne Formula 2 round	Next round: 2024 Melbourne Formula 2 round
