= 2023 Jeddah Formula 2 round =

Motor racing event

(Saudi Arabia) 2023 Jeddah Formula 2 round
Round details
- Round 2 of 13 in the 2023 FIA Formula 2 Championship.
- Location: Jeddah Corniche Circuit; Jeddah, Saudi Arabia
- Course: Street Circuit; 6.175 km (3.837 mi)

Sprint Race
- Date: 18 March 2023
- Laps: 20
Podium
First	(Japan) Ayumu Iwasa	DAMS
Second	(France) Victor Martins	ART Grand Prix
Third	(India) Jehan Daruvala	MP Motorsport
Fastest lap
Driver	(France) Victor Martins	ART Grand Prix
- Time: 1:44.886 (on lap 14)

Feature Race
- Date: 19 March 2023
- Laps: 28
Pole position
Driver	(France) Victor Martins	ART Grand Prix
Time	1:41.326	
Podium
First	(Denmark) Frederik Vesti	Prema Racing
Second	(Australia) Jack Doohan	Invicta Virtuosi Racing
Third	(India) Jehan Daruvala	MP Motorsport
Fastest lap
Driver	(Monaco) Arthur Leclerc	DAMS
- Time: 1:43.647 (on lap 26)

The 2023 Jeddah FIA Formula 2 round was a motor racing event held between 17 and 19 March 2023 at the Jeddah Corniche Circuit. It was the second round of the 2023 FIA Formula 2 Championship and was held in support of the 2023 Saudi Arabian Grand Prix.

== Classification ==
=== Qualifying ===
Pos.	No.	Driver	Entrant	Time/Gap	Grid SR	Grid FR
1	6	(France) Victor Martins	ART Grand Prix	1:41.326	10	1
2	8	(United Kingdom) Oliver Bearman	Prema Racing	+0.744	8	2
3	5	(France) Théo Pourchaire	ART Grand Prix	+0.745	7	8^{1}
4	14	(Australia) Jack Doohan	Invicta Virtuosi Racing	+0.784	6	3
5	2	(India) Jehan Daruvala	MP Motorsport	+0.785	5	4
6	11	(Japan) Ayumu Iwasa	DAMS	+0.794	4	5
7	7	(Denmark) Frederik Vesti	Prema Racing	+0.969	9^{1}	6
8	24	(India) Kush Maini	Campos Racing	+1.034	3	7
9	25	(Switzerland) Ralph Boschung	Campos Racing	+1.171	2	9
10	9	(United States) Jak Crawford	Hitech Pulse-Eight	+1.227	1	10
11	21	(France) Clément Novalak	Trident	+1.250	16^{2}	11
12	23	(United States) Juan Manuel Correa	Van Amersfoort Racing	+1.291	11	12
13	12	(Monaco) Arthur Leclerc	DAMS	+1.303	12	13
14	4	(Brazil) Enzo Fittipaldi	Rodin Carlin	+1.360	13	14
15	1	(Norway) Dennis Hauger	MP Motorsport	+1.428	14	15
16	20	(Czech Republic) Roman Staněk	Trident	+1.469	21^{2}	16
17	3	(Barbados) Zane Maloney	Rodin Carlin	+1.493	15	17
18	16	(Israel) Roy Nissany	PHM Racing by Charouz	+1.528	17	18
19	10	(France) Isack Hadjar	Hitech Pulse-Eight	+1.753	18	19
20	22	(Netherlands) Richard Verschoor	Van Amersfoort Racing	+2.059	19	20
21	15	(Belgium) Amaury Cordeel	Invicta Virtuosi Racing	+2.410	20	21
22	17	(United States) Brad Benavides	PHM Racing by Charouz	+3.701	22	22
107% time: 1:48.418 (+7.092)

Notes

- ^1 – Frederik Vesti received a five-place grid drop for causing a collision with Richard Verschoor in the Sakhir Feature Race. The penalty will apply to the next race that the Dane participates in.
- ^2 – Clément Novalak and Roman Staněk have received five-place grid penalties for Saturday's Sprint Race after Trident mechanics were found to have failed to hand back both drivers’ set of tyres into parc fermé. Team personnel were also found to have worked on the sets of tyres before handing them in, breaching the Sporting Regulations, dropping down both drivers to P16 and P21 respectively.

=== Sprint race ===
Pos.	No.	Driver	Entrant	Laps	Time/Retired	Grid	Points
1	11	(Japan) Ayumu Iwasa	DAMS	20	42:21.514	4	10
2	6	(France) Victor Martins	ART Grand Prix	20	+0.700	10	8 (1)
3	2	(India) Jehan Daruvala	MP Motorsport	20	+1.186	5	6
4	25	(Switzerland) Ralph Boschung	Campos Racing	20	+1.979	2	5
5	24	(India) Kush Maini	Campos Racing	20	+2.544	3	4
6	7	(Denmark) Frederik Vesti	Prema Racing	20	+2.940	9	3
7	14	(Australia) Jack Doohan	Invicta Virtuosi Racing	20	+3.380	6	2
8	1	(Norway) Dennis Hauger	MP Motorsport	20	+4.555	14	1
9	9	(United States) Jak Crawford	Hitech Pulse-Eight	20	+4.578	1	
10	16	(Israel) Roy Nissany	PHM Racing by Charouz	20	+6.412	17	
11	12	(Monaco) Arthur Leclerc	DAMS	20	+6.886	12	
12	10	(France) Isack Hadjar	Hitech Pulse-Eight	20	+7.642	18	
13	4	(Brazil) Enzo Fittipaldi	Rodin Carlin	20	+8.358	13	
14	23	(United States) Juan Manuel Correa	Van Amersfoort Racing	20	+13.127	11	
15	21	(France) Clément Novalak	Trident	20	+13.743	16	
16	22	(Netherlands) Richard Verschoor	Van Amersfoort Racing	20	+13.778	19	
17	20	(Czech Republic) Roman Staněk	Trident	20	+14.260	21	
18	17	(United States) Brad Benavides	PHM Racing by Charouz	20	+20.500	22	
19	15	(Belgium) Amaury Cordeel	Invicta Virtuosi Racing	20	+35.418	20	
DNF	8	(United Kingdom) Oliver Bearman	Prema Racing	6	Collision	8	
DNF	5	(France) Théo Pourchaire	ART Grand Prix	6	Collision	7	
DNF	3	(Barbados) Zane Maloney	Rodin Carlin	1	Spun off	15	
Fastest lap set by (France) Victor Martins: 1:44.886 (lap 14)

=== Feature Race ===
Pos.	No.	Driver	Entrant	Laps	Time/Retired	Grid	Points
1	7	(Denmark) Frederik Vesti	Prema Racing	28	50:45.587	6	25
2	14	(Australia) Jack Doohan	Invicta Virtuosi Racing	28	+3.959	3	18
3	2	(India) Jehan Daruvala	MP Motorsport	28	+7.546	4	15
4	11	(Japan) Ayumu Iwasa	DAMS	28	+11.379	5	12
5	1	(Norway) Dennis Hauger	MP Motorsport	28	+11.712	15	10
6	22	(Netherlands) Richard Verschoor	Van Amersfoort Racing	28	+14.014	20	8
7	4	(Brazil) Enzo Fittipaldi	Rodin Carlin	28	+14.220	14	6
8	12	(Monaco) Arthur Leclerc	DAMS	28	+17.012	13	4 (1)
9	10	(France) Isack Hadjar	Hitech Pulse-Eight	28	+21.646	19	2
10	8	(United Kingdom) Oliver Bearman	Prema Racing	28	+23.910	2	1
11	16	(Israel) Roy Nissany	PHM Racing by Charouz	28	+28.854	18	
12	24	(India) Kush Maini	Campos Racing	28	+29.371	7	
13	5	(France) Théo Pourchaire	ART Grand Prix	28	+31.238	8^{3}	
14	20	(Czech Republic) Roman Staněk	Trident	28	+32.019	16	
15	9	(United States) Jak Crawford	Hitech Pulse-Eight	28	+32.973	10	
16	21	(France) Clément Novalak	Trident	28	+36.131	11	
17	3	(Barbados) Zane Maloney	Rodin Carlin	28	+37.076	17	
18	23	(United States) Juan Manuel Correa	Van Amersfoort Racing	28	+40.339	12	
19	25	(Switzerland) Ralph Boschung	Campos Racing	28	+47.097	9	
20	15	(Belgium) Amaury Cordeel	Invicta Virtuosi Racing	28	+1:31.499	21	
DNF	6	(France) Victor Martins	ART Grand Prix	16	Spun off	1	(2)
DNF	17	(United States) Brad Benavides	PHM Racing by Charouz	1	Collision damage	22	
Fastest lap set by (Monaco) Arthur Leclerc: 1:43.647 (lap 26)

Notes:

- ^3 – Prior to the Feature Race, Théo Pourchaire received a five-place grid penalty for causing an avoidable collision with Oliver Bearman during Saturday's Sprint Race.

== Standings after the event ==
Drivers' Championship standings

	Pos.	Driver	Points
1	1	(Switzerland) Ralph Boschung	33
1	2	(France) Théo Pourchaire	32
3	3	(Japan) Ayumu Iwasa	31
17	4	(Denmark) Frederik Vesti	28
6	5	(India) Jehan Daruvala	24

Teams' Championship standings

	Pos.	Team	Points
	1	(Spain) Campos Racing	51
	2	(France) ART Grand Prix	49
1	3	(France) DAMS	44
2	4	(Netherlands) MP Motorsport	43
6	5	(Italy) Prema Racing	29

- Note: Only the top five positions are included for both sets of standings.

== See also ==
- 2023 Saudi Arabian Grand Prix

Previous round: 2023 Sakhir Formula 2 round	FIA Formula 2 Championship; 2023 season	Next round: 2023 Melbourne Formula 2 round
Previous round: 2022 Jeddah Formula 2 round	Jeddah Formula 2 round	Next round: 2024 Jeddah Formula 2 round
