= Brad Benavides =

American racing driver (born 2001)

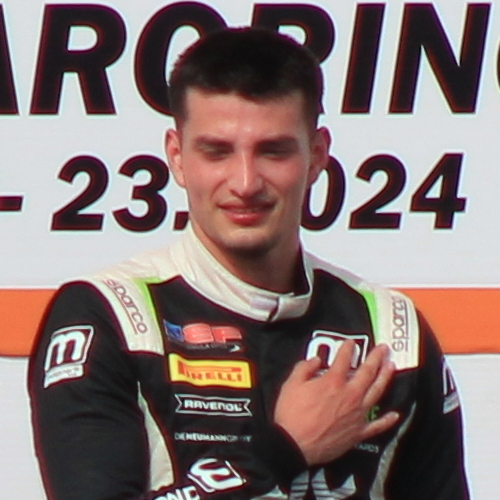
- Benavides in 2024
- Nationality: (United States) American (Spain) Spanish (Note: Benavides, a dual citizen, competed under a Spanish racing licence earlier in his career. Since mid-2022, he represents the United States.)
- Born: Brad Domenico Benavides Agredo; 20 July 2001 (age 25) Fort Lauderdale, Florida, U.S.

FIA Formula 3 Championship career
- Debut season: 2022
- Car number: 26
- Former teams: Carlin, AIX Racing
- Starts: 36
- Wins: 0
- Podiums: 0
- Poles: 2
- Fastest laps: 0
- Best finish: 20th in 2025

Previous series
- 2023; 2023; 2021; 2019; 2018, 2021, 2024: FIA Formula 2; FR Middle East; FR European; Formula Renault Eurocup; Euroformula Open

Championship titles
- 2024: Euroformula Open
- Statistics up to date as of 25 August 2026.

Brad Domenico Benavides Agredo (born 20 July 2001) is an American, Spanish and Guatemalan racing driver who last competed in the FIA Formula 3 Championship for AIX Racing.

Benavides is the 2024 Euroformula Open champion with Motopark. He previously raced in FIA Formula 3 for Carlin in 2022 and Formula 2 for PHM Racing by Charouz in 2023.

== Career ==
=== Karting ===
Benavides started his karting career in 2016. He finished ninth in the 2017 WSK Final Cup in the KZ2-class, fourth in the WSK Champions Cup in 2018 and won the IAME Winter Cup the following year in the X30 Shifter class. Two years later, he came 11th in the KZ category of the Spanish Karting Championship with two wins, having missed the final two rounds due to his racing commitments.

=== 2018–2019: First single-seater years ===
Benavides made his single-seater debut in the final round of the 2018 Euroformula Open Championship for Campos Racing. He finished ninth in the first race, however he didn't score any points as he was classed as a guest driver.

In 2019, Benavides raced for FA Racing in the Formula Renault Eurocup. He scored no points, and with a best race finish of eighth in Spa-Francorchamps but was later kicked out of the points due to a post race penalty. He finished 23rd in the standings having participated in six out of the ten rounds.

=== 2021: FRECA and second Euroformula Open stint ===
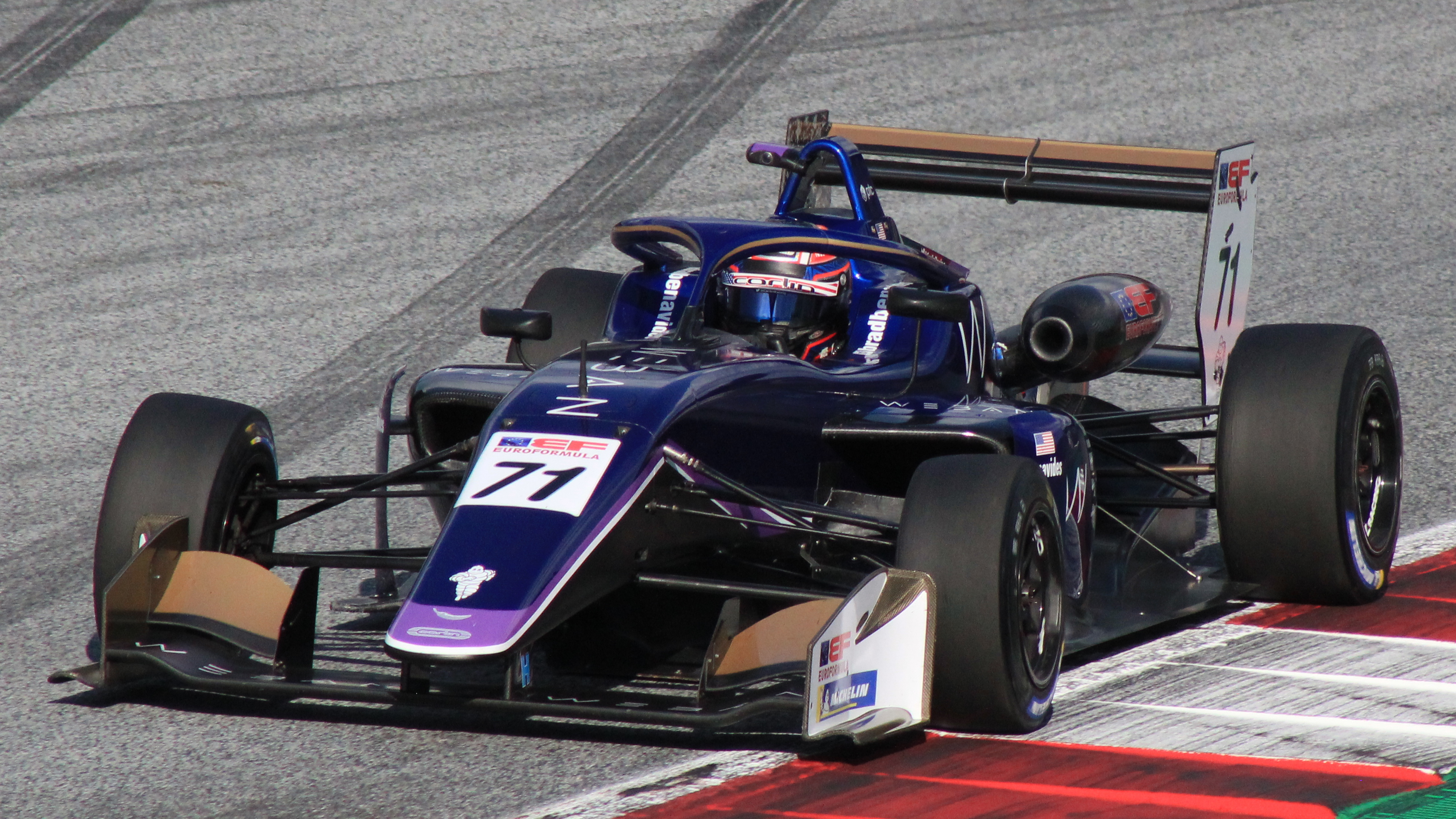
Benavides racing in the Euroformula Open in 2021

Benavides was expected to race for DR Formula RP Motorsport during the 2020 Formula Regional European Championship, but did not appear in any rounds. However, after a one-year hiatus Benavides made his return to racing in the Formula Regional European Championship with DR Formula RP Motorsport. During the opening round in Imola, Benavides retired from the first race, but finished 14th in race two. He then raced in four more rounds until he left the championship midway through the ten rounds.

Benavides then joined Carlin for the final three rounds of Euroformula Open. He would score points in all but one of the races that he competed in, and with a highest finish of sixth during the final round in Barcelona, he finished 13th in the standings.

=== 2022: FIA Formula 3 debut ===
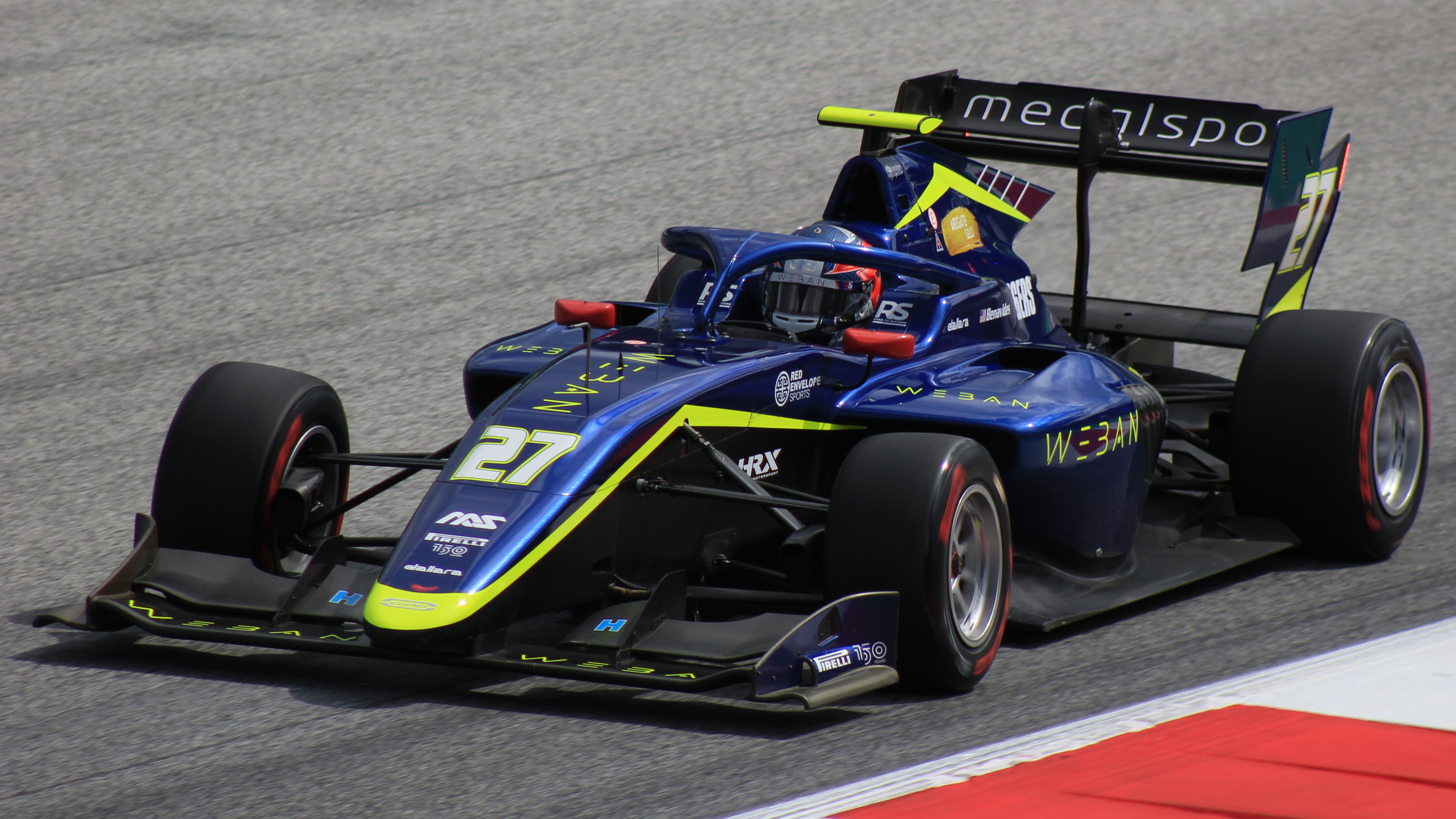
Benavides driving the Dallara F3 2019 during the 2022 Spielberg Formula 3 round.

Having tested for Carlin during the 2021 post-season test, Benavides joined the team for the 2022 FIA Formula 3 season. He struggled to score points all season, though mixed weather during qualifying at Spa allowed him to start near the front during the sprint race, from where he would go on to finish eighth, scoring his only points of the season. He ended the season 23rd in the standings with three points, ahead of teammate Enzo Trulli but far from other teammate and Williams Driver Academy member Zak O'Sullivan. During September, Benavides contested the final day of post-season testing with ART Grand Prix.

=== 2023: Formula 2 debut ===
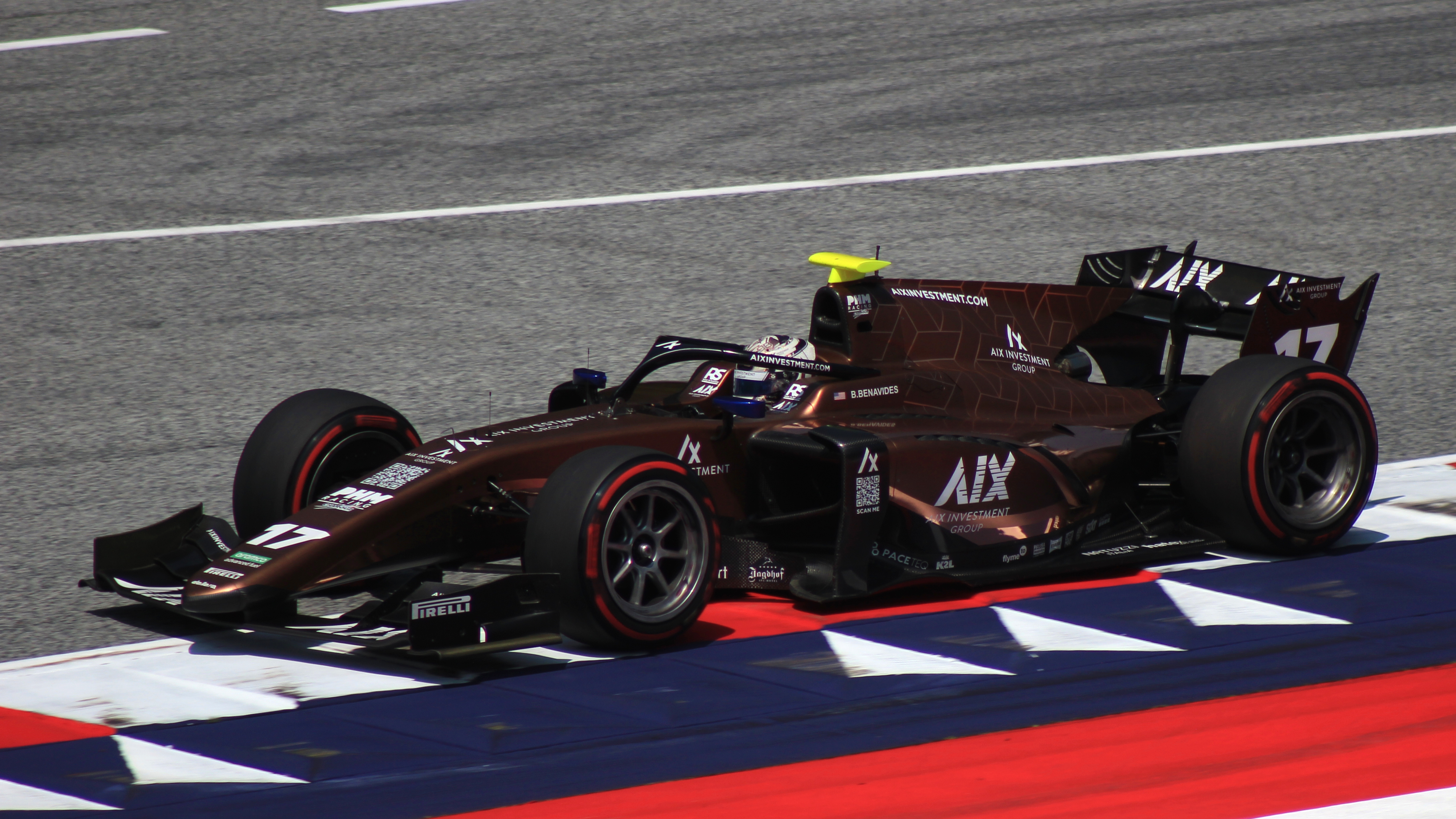
Benavides driving the Dallara F2 2018 during the 2023 Spielberg Formula 2 round

In November 2022, Benavides would compete in the Formula 2 post-season test for Charouz Racing System, partnering F2 veteran Roy Nissany at the Yas Marina Circuit. Shortly after, Benavides was confirmed to drive for the outfit in 2023 alongside Nissany under the new name PHM Racing by Charouz. He prepared for the season by competing in the Formula Regional Middle East Championship at the start of the year with Hyderabad Blackbirds by MP Motorsport, taking two points finishes and notably being involved in a crash at Kuwait Motor Town where his car flipped over several cars, Benavides narrowly outqualified teammate Nissany during his Formula 2 debut. The year would become a struggle, as Benavides failed to score points throughout the campaign. In addition, he would become involved in multiple incidents, namely a collision with Amaury Cordeel in Jeddah, crashes at Melbourne and Baku, and a retirement on the opening lap of the Silverstone sprint race after being spun around by Clément Novalak. Before the round at Spa-Francorchamps, it was announced that Benavides would be replaced by Euroformula Open racer Josh Mason. Benavides did not return that year, finishing 22nd in the standings with a highest finish of tenth in the Baku sprint race.

=== 2024: Euroformula Open champion ===
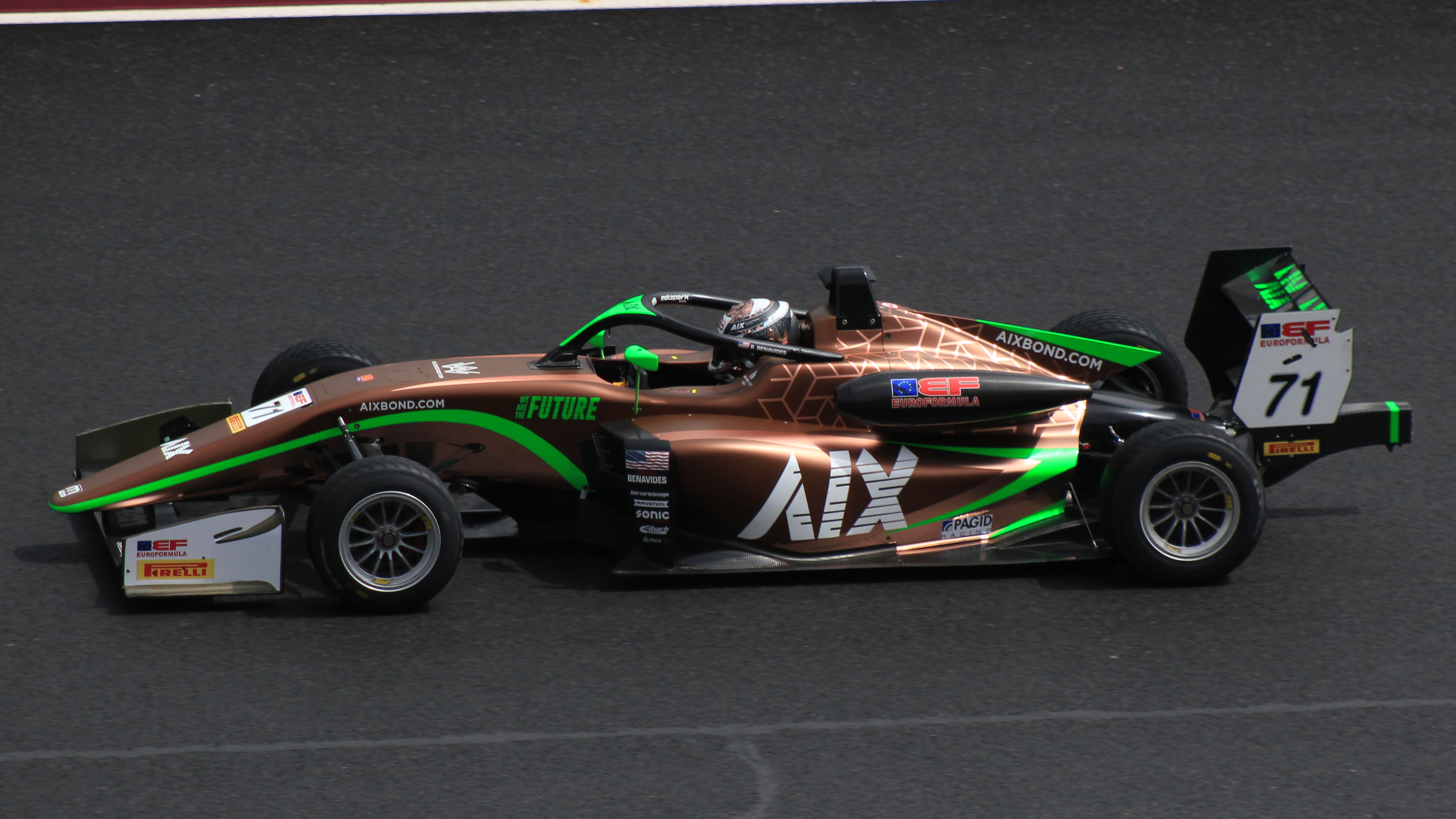
Benavides driving at the Hungaroring during the 2024 Euroformula Open

In 2024, Benavides returned to the Euroformula Open with Team Motopark. He scored his first single-seater win during the opening round in Portimão, and finished runner-up in the other two races. He then took a further win in Hockenheim, before winning twice in Spa-Francorchamps. He went on to win once during each round of the remainder of the season, allowing Benavides to clinch the title with a round to spare.

=== 2025–2026: Return to Formula 3 ===
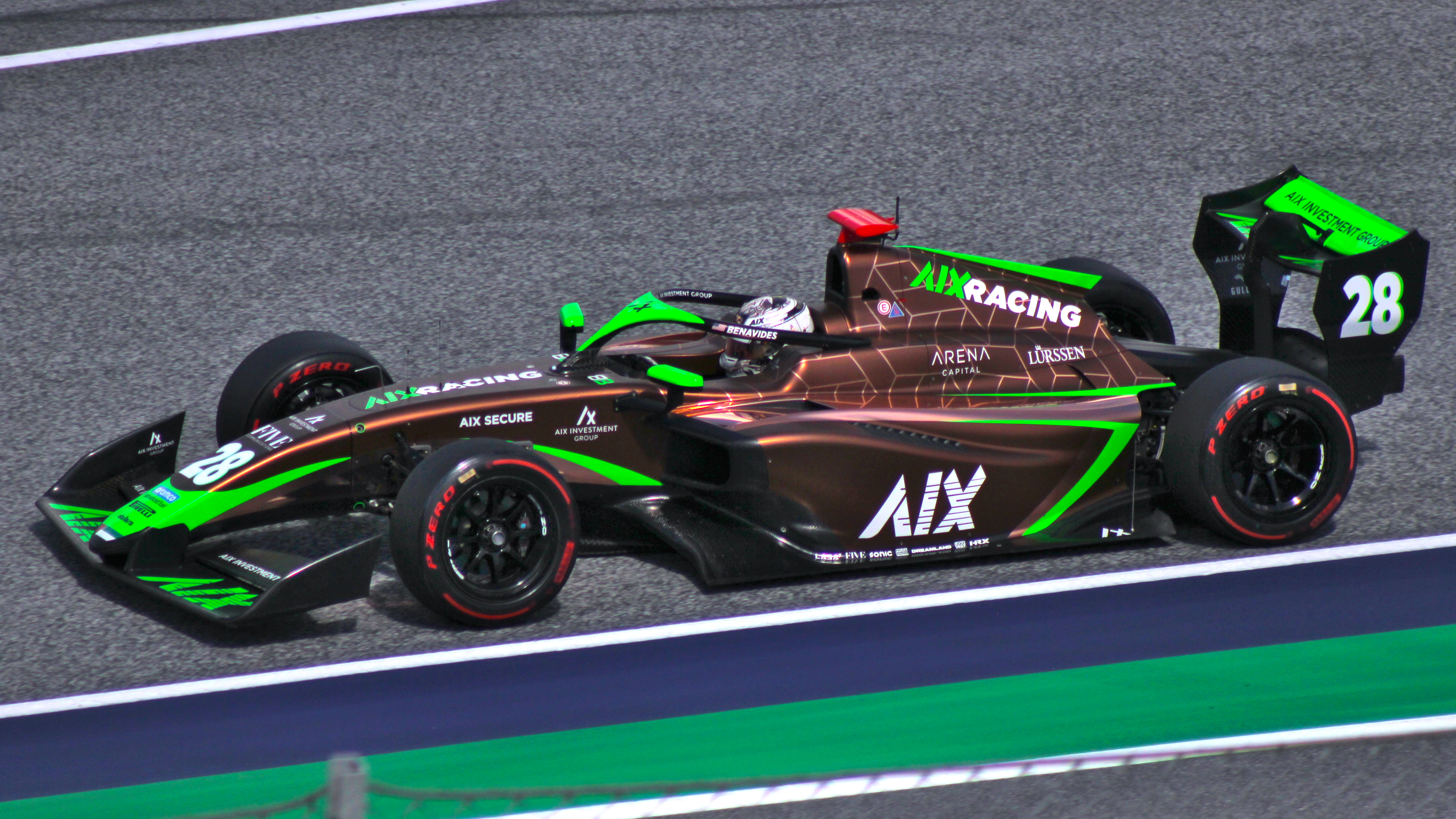
Benavides driving the Dallara F3 2025 during the 2025 Spielberg Formula 3 round

In January 2025, Benavides tested for HMD Motorsports during an Indy NXT test at the Sebring International Raceway. However, Benavides returned to FIA Formula 3 for the 2025 season, driving for AIX Racing starting at round three in Imola. He completed the rest of the season with the team, partnering Nicola Marinangeli and James Hedley. He had an anonymous first few rounds, but shocked in Austria with a front row start. His sprint race was compromised by contact with rivals, but was able to secure his first points in the feature race despite a trip to the gravel trap, placing in ninth place. He would later secure his first pole in the series in Spa-Francorchamps, but was unable to capitalise on this as the feature was cut short early due to treacherous conditions. He was able to repeat this feat in Monza, and had a fierce battle for the lead but eventually settled for fourth place. Despite not contesting in two rounds that season, he finished 20th in the standings with eighteen points.

Benavides continued with AIX Racing for a full season in 2026, alongside teammates Fernando Barrichello and Yevan David. He would finish 17th in the sprint race during the opening round at Australia, then improving to seventh during the feature race. During the opening lap of the sprint race at Monaco in the 2026 season, Benavides suffered an injury after his car went over the top of one of his competitors. On a since-deleted instagram story, he said he broke three vertebra in the incident. He was therefore forced to withdraw from the rest of the weekend and take a period of recovery away from racing. His recovery meant that he missed the remainder of the Formula 3 season, and in August 2026, AIX Racing confirmed that Benavides had left the team.

== Personal life ==
Benavides was born in Fort Lauderdale, Florida to a Guatemalan father and a Colombian mother, and has roots tracing back to the Spanish town of Benavides, the motto of which he carries on his helmet. He also possesses Spanish and Guatemalan citizenship in addition to his U.S. nationality.

== Karting record ==
=== Karting career summary ===
Season	Series	Team	Position
2016	South Garda Winter Cup — OKJ		52nd
2016	CIK-FIA European Championship — OKJ		NC†
2017	South Garda Winter Cup — KZ2		65th
2017	Trofeo delle Industrie — KZ2	CPB Sport	27th
2017	WSK Super Master Series — KZ2		75th
2017	Coupe de France — KZ2		40th
2017	International Super Cup — KZ2		78th
2017	WSK Final Cup — KZ2	CPB Sport	9th
2018	WSK Champions Cup — KZ2	CPB Sport	4th
2018	WSK Super Master Series — KZ2	CPB Sport	26th
2018	WSK Open Cup — KZ2		17th
2018	CIK-FIA European Championship — KZ2	CPB Sport	39th
2018	International Super Cup — KZ2		104th
2019	IAME Winter Cup — X30 Shifter	Campos Racing	1st
2020	Champions of the Future — KZ2		9th
2021	WSK Champions Cup — KZ2		29th
2021	WSK Super Master Series — KZ2		50th
2021	Spanish Karting Championship — KZ	DMK Racing Team	11th

^{†} As Benavides was a guest driver, he was ineligible to score points.

== Racing record ==
=== Racing career summary ===
Season	Series	Team	Races	Wins	Poles	F/Laps	Podiums	Points	Position
2018	Euroformula Open Championship	Campos Racing	2	0	0	0	0	0	NC†
2019	Formula Renault Eurocup	FA Racing by Drivex	13	0	0	0	0	0	23rd
2021	Formula Regional European Championship	DR Formula RP Motorsport	10	0	0	0	0	0	26th
2021	Euroformula Open Championship	Carlin Motorsport	9	0	0	0	0	39	13th
2022	FIA Formula 3 Championship	Carlin	18	0	0	0	0	3	23rd
2023	Formula Regional Middle East Championship	Hyderabad Blackbirds by MP	13	0	0	0	0	1	29th
2023	FIA Formula 2 Championship	PHM Racing by Charouz	18	0	0	0	0	0	22nd
2024	Euroformula Open Championship	Team Motopark	24	9	4	10	19	431	**1st**
2025	FIA Formula 3 Championship	AIX Racing	15	0	2	0	0	18	20th
2026	FIA Formula 3 Championship	AIX Racing	3	0	0	0	0	6	25th

^{†} As Benavides was a guest driver, he was ineligible to score points.
* Season still in progress.

=== Complete Euroformula Open Championship results ===
(key) (Races in bold indicate pole position; races in italics indicate points for the fastest lap of top ten finishers)

Year	Entrant	1	2	3	4	5	6	7	8	9	10	11	12	13	14	15	16	17	18	19	20	21	22	23	24	DC	Points
2018	Campos Racing	EST; 1	EST; 2	LEC; 1	LEC; 2	SPA; 1	SPA; 2	HUN; 1	HUN; 2	SIL; 1	SIL; 2	MNZ; 1	MNZ; 2	JER; 1	JER; 2	CAT; 1; 9	CAT; 2; 13									NC†	0
2021	Carlin Motorsport	POR; 1	POR; 2	POR; 3	LEC; 1	LEC; 2	LEC; 3	SPA; 1	SPA; 2	SPA; 3	HUN; 1	HUN; 2	HUN; 3	IMO; 1	IMO; 2	IMO; 3	RBR; 1; 10	RBR; 2; 9	RBR; 3; 8	MNZ; 1; 7	MNZ; 2; 7	MNZ; 3; 7	CAT; 1; 8*	CAT; 2; 6	CAT; 3; 14	13th	39
2024	Team Motopark	PRT; 1; 2*	PRT; 2; 1*	PRT; 3; 2	**HOC**; **1**; 1	HOC; 2; 2	HOC; 3; 5	SPA; 1; 1	SPA; 2; 1*	SPA; 3; 3*	HUN; 1; 1	HUN; 2; 3*	HUN; 3; 2*	**LEC**; **1**; 3	LEC; 2; 1*	LEC; 3; 2*	RBR; 1; 1	RBR; 2; 5	RBR; 3; 2	CAT; 1; 1	CAT; 2; 3	CAT; 3; 5	MNZ; 1; 6	MNZ; 2; 1	MNZ; 3; 4	1st	431

=== Complete Formula Renault Eurocup results ===
(key) (Races in bold indicate pole position) (Races in italics indicate fastest lap)

Year	Team	1	2	3	4	5	6	7	8	9	10	11	12	13	14	15	16	17	18	19	20	Pos	Points
2019	FA Racing	MNZ; 1; 14	MNZ; 2 Ret	SIL; 1; 19	SIL; 2; 18	MON; 1; 17	MON; 2; 14	LEC; 1; 14	LEC; 2; 18	SPA; 1; 19	SPA; 2; 13	NÜR; 1 WD	NÜR; 2 WD	HUN; 1 DNS	HUN; 2; 16	CAT; 1; 14	CAT; 2; 14	HOC; 1	HOC; 2	YMC; 1	YMC; 2	23rd	0

=== Complete Formula Regional European Championship results ===
(key) (Races in bold indicate pole position) (Races in italics indicate fastest lap)

Year	Team	1	2	3	4	5	6	7	8	9	10	11	12	13	14	15	16	17	18	19	20	DC	Points
2021	DR Formula RP Motorsport	IMO; 1 Ret	IMO; 2; 14	CAT; 1; 16	CAT; 2; 12	MCO; 1; 24	MCO; 2 Ret	LEC; 1; 28	LEC; 2; 20	ZAN; 1; 21	ZAN; 2; 20	SPA; 1	SPA; 2	RBR; 1	RBR; 2	VAL; 1	VAL; 2	MUG; 1	MUG; 2	MNZ; 1	MNZ; 2	26th	0

=== Complete FIA Formula 3 Championship results ===
(key) (Races in bold indicate pole position; races in italics indicate points for the fastest lap of top ten finishers)

Year	Entrant	1	2	3	4	5	6	7	8	9	10	11	12	13	14	15	16	17	18	19	20	DC	Points
2022	Carlin	BHR; SPR; 21	BHR; FEA; 20	IMO; SPR; 14	IMO; FEA; Ret	CAT; SPR; 25	CAT; FEA; Ret	SIL; SPR; NC	SIL; FEA; 20	RBR; SPR; 20	RBR; FEA; 20	HUN; SPR; Ret	HUN; FEA; 22	SPA; SPR; 8	SPA; FEA; 18	ZAN; SPR; 26	ZAN; FEA; Ret	MNZ; SPR; 18	MNZ; FEA; 14			23rd	3
2025	AIX Racing	MEL; SPR	MEL; FEA	BHR; SPR	BHR; FEA	IMO; SPR; 12	IMO; FEA; 24	MON; SPR; 12	MON; FEA; Ret	CAT; SPR; 15	CAT; FEA; 24	RBR; SPR; Ret	RBR; FEA; 9	SIL; SPR; 14	SIL; FEA; Ret	SPA; SPR; 19	**SPA**; **FEA**; C	HUN; SPR; Ret	HUN; FEA; Ret	MNZ; SPR; 26	**MNZ**; **FEA**; 4	20th	18
2026	AIX Racing	MEL; SPR; 17	MEL; FEA; 7	MON; SPR; Ret	MON; FEA; WD	CAT; SPR	CAT; FEA	RBR; SPR	RBR; FEA	SIL; SPR	SIL; FEA	SPA; SPR	SPA; FEA	HUN; SPR	HUN; FEA	MNZ; SPR	MNZ; FEA	MAD; SPR	MAD; FEA1	MAD; FEA2		25th	6

=== Complete Formula Regional Middle East Championship results ===
(key) (Races in bold indicate pole position) (Races in italics indicate fastest lap)

Year	Entrant	1	2	3	4	5	6	7	8	9	10	11	12	13	14	15	DC	Points
2023	Hyderabad Blackbirds by MP	DUB1; 1; 24	DUB1; 2; 20	DUB1; 3; 15	KUW1; 1 Ret	KUW1; 2 DNS	KUW1; 3 DNS	KUW2; 1; 16	KUW2; 2; 10	KUW2; 3 Ret	DUB2; 1; 11	DUB2; 2; 11	DUB2; 3; 22†	ABU; 1; 18	ABU; 2; 15	ABU; 3; 10	29th	2

=== Complete FIA Formula 2 Championship results ===
(key) (Races in bold indicate pole position) (Races in italics indicate points for the fastest lap of top ten finishers)

Year	Entrant	1	2	3	4	5	6	7	8	9	10	11	12	13	14	15	16	17	18	19	20	21	22	23	24	25	26	DC	Points
2023	PHM Racing by Charouz	BHR; SPR; 19	BHR; FEA; 18	JED; SPR; 18	JED; FEA; Ret	MEL; SPR; Ret	MEL; FEA; 12	BAK; SPR; 10	BAK; FEA; Ret	MCO; SPR; 11	MCO; FEA; 16	CAT; SPR; 15	CAT; FEA; 22	RBR; SPR; 12	RBR; FEA; 19	SIL; SPR; Ret	SIL; FEA; 13	HUN; SPR; 18	HUN; FEA; 18	SPA; SPR	SPA; FEA	ZAN; SPR	ZAN; FEA	MNZ; SPR	MNZ; FEA	YMC; SPR	YMC; FEA	22nd	0
