= Josh Mason =

British racing driver (born 2002)

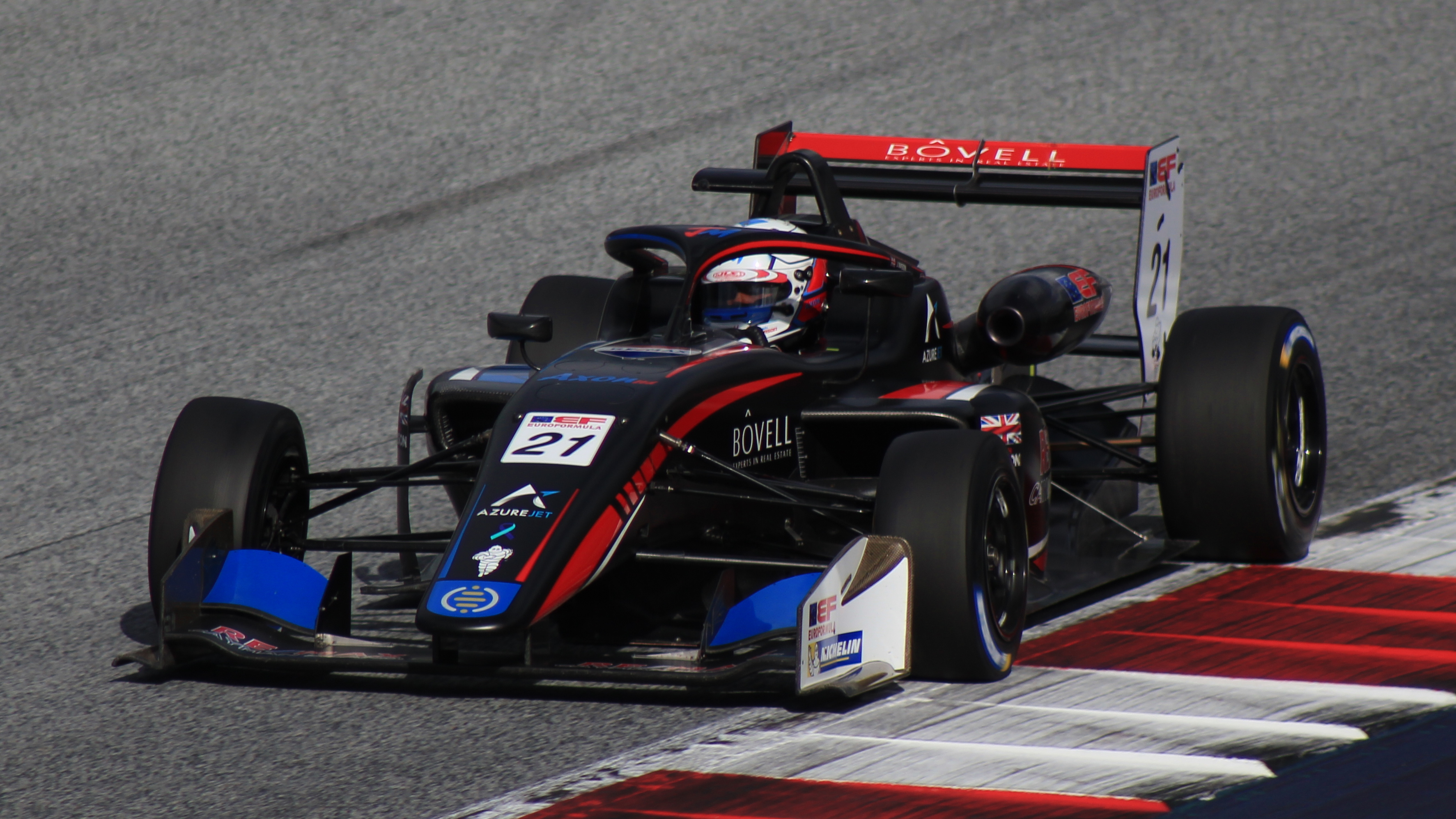
- Mason at the Red Bull Ring in 2022
- Nationality: (United Kingdom) British
- Born: Joshua Mason Akinwunmi; 19 March 2002 (age 24) Birmingham, West Midlands, England

Indy NXT career
- Debut season: 2024
- Current team: Abel Motorsports
- Categorisation: FIA Silver
- Car number: 21
- Starts: 2
- Championships: 0
- Wins: 0
- Podiums: 0
- Poles: 0
- Fastest laps: 0
- Best finish: 25th in 2024

Previous series
- 2023 2023 2021–23 2018–20: FIA Formula 2 Championship; FR Oceania Championship; Euroformula Open Championship; BRDC British Formula 3 Championship

Joshua Mason Akinwunmi (born 19 March 2002) is a British racing driver who currently races in the 2026 McLaren Trophy Europe. He is a race winner in Formula Regional Oceania, as well as both the Euroformula Open and BRDC British F3 Championships. He also completed a partial season of FIA Formula 2 with PHM Racing in 2023, and a partial season of Indy NXT in 2024.

== Career ==
=== Karting ===
Mason began competing in karts at the relatively late age of fourteen, taking part in club racing before moving into car racing.

=== BRDC British F3 ===
==== 2018 ====
In 2018, Mason graduated to car racing, driving for Lanan Racing in the BRDC British Formula 3 Championship. Having made his debut at Rockingham, the Brit would return to the series for the second half of the campaign, managing to win the reverse-grid race in the final round at Silverstone after it had been abandoned due to heavy rain following two laps behind the Safety car.

==== 2019 ====
Mason stayed at Lanan Racing for the 2019 season, competing as the team's sole full-time entrant. Despite this, Mason would manage to score three podiums in reverse-grid races, including a victory at Donington Park, where he overtook poleman Pavan Ravishankar at the Safety car restart. Mason ended up twelfth in the standings in a season that, given his lack of overall experience, he described as "having gone well".

==== 2020 ====
Once again, Mason remained with the same team in 2020, this time racing alongside Piers Prior and Bart Horsten. Having been unable to prepare adequately for the season due to living with a high-risk individual at the height of the COVID-19 pandemic, Mason only scored a sole podium at Donington and finished 16th in the championship, behind both of his teammates.

=== Euroformula Open ===
==== 2021 ====
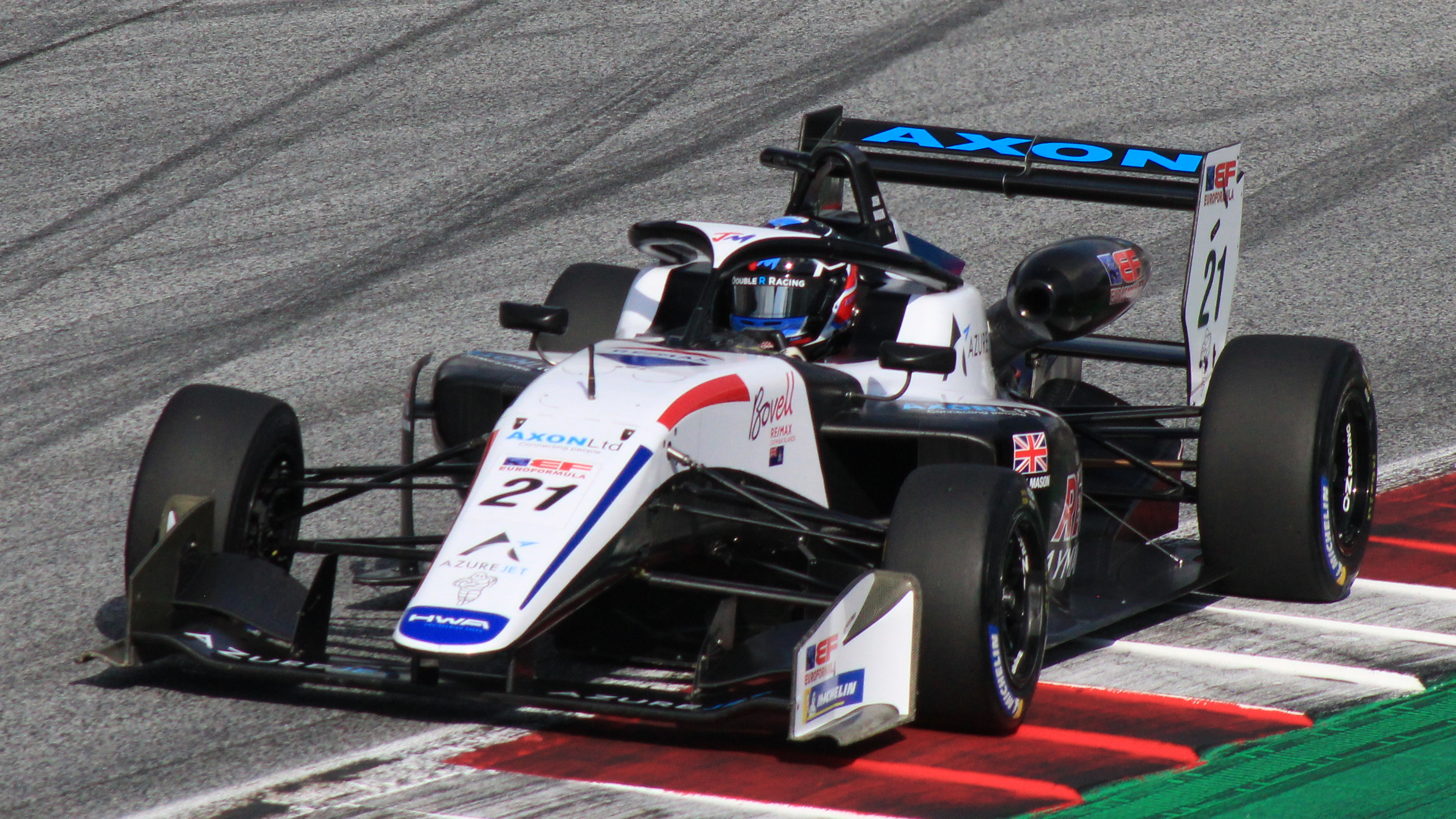
Mason racing in the 2021 Euroformula Open at the Red Bull Ring.

For 2021, Mason moved to the Euroformula Open Championship, driving for Double R Racing. His best result came at a wet Hungaroring, finishing fourth, as he ended up ninth in the standings, significantly ahead of rookie teammate Zdeněk Chovanec.

==== 2022 ====
The following year, the Brit made the switch to drive for CryptoTower Racing for the 2022 season, having stated that he had "learned a lot in 2021" and that he was "really looking forward" to linking up with the team. He started out the campaign with three points finishes in Estoril, before a crash during the Pau Grand Prix. Another retirement followed at Paul Ricard, caused by a collision with Alex García, before Mason scored his first podiums in the series at Spa, finishing third in Race 1 and second in Race 3. At the following round, held at the Hungaroring, Mason took his first victory, winning Race 2 in dominant fashion. The positive momentum remained, with Mason winning once more at Imola and Monza respectively. He ended the season fifth in the championship standings, narrowly missing out on fourth to Frederick Lubin.

==== 2023 ====
Mason returned to the Euroformula Open in 2023 with CryptoTower Racing for a cameo appearance at Circuit de Spa-Francorchamps. He returned at the Hungaroring, winning the last race.

=== Formula Regional ===
At the start of 2023, Mason joined the 2023 Formula Regional Oceania Championship, driving for Kiwi Motorsport. He achieved one win in Manfeild, which saw him end eighth in the standings.

=== FIA Formula 2 Championship ===
Mason was confirmed by PHM Racing by Charouz to compete in the 2023 Formula 2 Championship at Spa-Francorchamps, replacing Brad Benavides. He was retained for the Zandvoort round. After demonstrating decent pace throughout the first two rounds, Mason was confirmed to remain with the team for the final two rounds. He secured a best finish of twelfth in the Monza feature race and placed 23rd in the overall standings. He was set to remain with team for the 2024, but plans fell through due to funding issues.

=== Indy NXT ===
In 2024, Mason secured a deal to race in the Indy NXT with Abel Motorsports. However, he was released after two races.

== Personal life ==
Mason is of Nigerian descent through his father, and both Grenadian and Trinidadian/Tobagonian descent through his mother. Mason grew up between Sussex and the Cayman Islands, and played both football and rugby union in his youth before chest surgery prevented him from furthering either career.

== Racing record ==
=== Racing career summary ===
Season	Series	Team	Races	Wins	Poles	F/Laps	Podiums	Points	Position
2018	BRDC British Formula 3 Championship	Lanan Racing	14	1	0	0	1	82	20th
2018–19	MRF Challenge Formula 2000 Championship	MRF Racing	14	0	0	0	0	19	12th
2019	BRDC British Formula 3 Championship	Lanan Racing	24	1	0	0	3	229	12th
2019–20	MRF Challenge Formula 2000 Championship	MRF Racing	15	0	0	0	6	176	**3rd**
2020	BRDC British Formula 3 Championship	Lanan Racing	24	0	0	0	1	139	16th
2021	Euroformula Open Championship	Double R Racing	24	0	0	0	0	89	9th
2022	Euroformula Open Championship	CryptoTower Racing	26	3	0	1	7	278	5th
2023	Formula Regional Oceania Championship	Kiwi Motorsport	15	1	0	1	1	186	8th
2023	Euroformula Open Championship	CryptoTower Racing Team	6	1	0	0	3	96	11th
2023	FIA Formula 2 Championship	PHM Racing by Charouz	8	0	0	0	0	0	23rd
2024	Indy NXT	Abel Motorsports	2	0	0	0	0	27	25th
2025	GT World Challenge Europe Endurance Cup	CSA Racing	1	0	0	0	0	0	NC
2025	McLaren Trophy Europe	Greystone GT	10	2	1	1	4	80	5th
2026	McLaren Trophy Europe	Greystone GT	10	1	2	1	5	53.3	**2nd**

* Season still in progress.

=== Complete BRDC British Formula 3 Championship results ===
(key) (Races in bold indicate pole position) (Races in italics indicate fastest lap)

Year	Team	1	2	3	4	5	6	7	8	9	10	11	12	13	14	15	16	17	18	19	20	21	22	23	24	Pos	Points
2018	Lanan Racing	OUL; 1	OUL; 2	OUL; 3	ROC; 1 Ret	ROC; 2; 18	ROC; 3; 9	SNE; 1	SNE; 2	SNE; 3	SIL; 1	SIL; 2	SIL; 3	SPA; 1; 14	SPA; 2; 15	SPA; 3 Ret	BRH; 1; 15	BRH; 2; 14^{2}	BRH; 3; 15	DON; 1; 16	DON; 2; 7	DON; 3; 14	SIL; 1; 16	SIL; 2; 1	SIL; 3 C	20th	82
2019	Lanan Racing	OUL; 1; 10	OUL; 2; 5	OUL; 3; 14	SNE; 1; 14	SNE; 2 Ret	SNE; 3; 9	SIL1; 1; 12	SIL1; 2; 7	SIL1; 3; 12	DON1; 1; 13	DON1; 2; 1^{2}	DON1; 3; 12	SPA; 1; 14	SPA; 2; 2^{3}	SPA; 3; 9	BRH; 1; 13	BRH; 2; 3^{1}	BRH; 3; 11	SIL2; 1; 11	SIL2; 2 Ret	SIL2; 3; 9	DON2; 1; 12	DON2; 2; 13	DON2; 3; 13	12th	229
2020	Lanan Racing	OUL; 1 Ret	OUL; 2; 15^{2}	OUL; 3; 14	OUL; 4; 14	DON1; 1; 12	DON1; 2; 10	DON1; 3 Ret	BRH; 1; 10	BRH; 2; 9	BRH; 3; 12	BRH; 4; 13	DON2; 1; 14	DON2; 2; 2^{1}	DON2; 3; 13	SNE; 1 Ret	SNE; 2; 17^{1}	SNE; 3; 9	SNE; 4 Ret	DON3; 1 Ret	DON3; 2; 14^{1}	DON3; 3; 11	SIL; 1; 16	SIL; 2; 19	SIL; 3; 13	16th	139

=== Complete MRF Challenge Formula 2000 Championship results ===
(key) (Races in bold indicate pole position; races in italics indicate points for the fastest lap of the race finishers)

Year	Team	1	2	3	4	5	6	7	8	9	10	11	12	13	14	15	DC	Points
2018–19	MRF Racing	DUB; 1; 9	DUB; 2; 10	DUB; 3; 10	DUB; 4; 9	DUB; 5; 11	BHR; 1; 12	BHR; 2; 10	BHR; 3; 10	BHR; 4; 10	BHR; 5; 8	CHE; 1; 14	CHE; 2; 12	CHE; 3 Ret	CHE; 4 DNS	CHE; 5; 12	12th	19
2019–20	MRF Racing	DUB; 1; 2	DUB; 2; 2	DUB; 3; 3	DUB; 4; 6	DUB; 5; 2	BHR; 1; 5	BHR; 2; 4	BHR; 3; 4	BHR; 4; 8	CHE; 1; 3	CHE; 2; 2	CHE; 3; 4	CHE; 4; 4	CHE; 5 Ret	CHE; 6; 9	3rd	176

=== Complete Euroformula Open Championship results ===
(key) (Races in bold indicate pole position; races in italics indicate points for the fastest lap of top ten finishers)

Year	Entrant	1	2	3	4	5	6	7	8	9	10	11	12	13	14	15	16	17	18	19	20	21	22	23	24	25	26	DC	Points
2021	Double R Racing	POR; 1; 8	POR; 2; 6	POR; 3; 5	LEC; 1; 8	LEC; 2; 12	LEC; 3; 7	SPA; 1 Ret	SPA; 2; 6	SPA; 3; 8	HUN; 1; 4*	HUN; 2; 7	HUN; 3 Ret	IMO; 1 Ret	IMO; 2; 8	IMO; 3; 11	RBR; 1 Ret	RBR; 2; 10*	RBR; 3; 7	MNZ; 1; 12	MNZ; 2; 12	MNZ; 3; 11	CAT; 1; 7	CAT; 2; 15	CAT; 3; 7			9th	89
2022	CryptoTower Racing	EST; 1; 7	EST; 2; 5	EST; 3; 8	PAU; 1; 4	PAU; 2 Ret	LEC; 1 Ret	LEC; 2; 4*	LEC; 3; 7	SPA; 1; 3*	SPA; 2; 7	SPA; 3; 2	HUN; 1; 5	HUN; 2; 1	HUN; 3; 7	IMO; 1; 6	IMO; 2; 7	IMO; 3; 1	RBR; 1; 4	RBR; 2; 3	RBR; 3; 5	MNZ; 1; 5	MNZ; 2; 1	MNZ; 3; 2	CAT; 1; 9	CAT; 2; 6*	CAT; 3 Ret	5th	278
2023	CryptoTower Racing	POR; 1	POR; 2	POR; 3	SPA; 1; 4	SPA; 2; 5	SPA; 3; 4	HUN; 1; 3*	HUN; 2; 2*	HUN; 3; 1	LEC; 1	LEC; 2	LEC; 3	RBR; 1	RBR; 2	RBR; 3	MNZ; 1	MNZ; 2	MNZ; 3	MUG; 1	MUG; 2	CAT; 1	CAT; 2	CAT; 3				11th	96

=== Complete Formula Regional Oceania Championship results ===
(key) (Races in bold indicate pole position) (Races in italics indicate fastest lap)

Year	Team	1	2	3	4	5	6	7	8	9	10	11	12	13	14	15	DC	Points
2023	Kiwi Motorsport	HIG; 1; 4	HIG; 2; 9	HIG; 3; 11	TER; 1; 4	TER; 2; 8	TER; 3; 4	MAN; 1; 7	MAN; 2; 1	MAN; 3 Ret	HMP; 1; 13	HMP; 2; 9	HMP; 3; 12	TAU; 1; 7	TAU; 2; 15	TAU; 3; 16	8th	186

=== Complete FIA Formula 2 Championship results ===
(key) (Races in bold indicate pole position) (Races in italics indicate points for the fastest lap of top ten finishers)

Year	Entrant	1	2	3	4	5	6	7	8	9	10	11	12	13	14	15	16	17	18	19	20	21	22	23	24	25	26	DC	Points
2023	PHM Racing by Charouz	BHR; SPR	BHR; FEA	JED; SPR	JED; FEA	MEL; SPR	MEL; FEA	BAK; SPR	BAK; FEA	MCO; SPR	MCO; FEA	CAT; SPR	CAT; FEA	RBR; SPR	RBR; FEA	SIL; SPR	SIL; FEA	HUN; SPR	HUN; FEA	SPA; SPR; 19	SPA; FEA; 14	ZAN; SPR; 18	ZAN; FEA; 15	MNZ; SPR; 16	MNZ; FEA; 12	YMC; SPR; 15	YMC; FEA; Ret	23rd	0

=== American open–wheel racing results ===
==== Indy NXT ====
(key) (Races in bold indicate pole position) (Races in italics indicate fastest lap) (Races with ^{L} indicate a race lap led) (Races with * indicate most race laps led)

Year	Team	1	2	3	4	5	6	7	8	9	10	11	12	13	14	Rank	Points
2024	Abel Motorsports	STP; 17	BAR; 16	IMS	IMS	DET	ROA	LAG	LAG	MOH	IOW	GTW	POR	MIL	NSH	25th	27
