= Amaury Cordeel =

Belgian racing driver (born 2002)

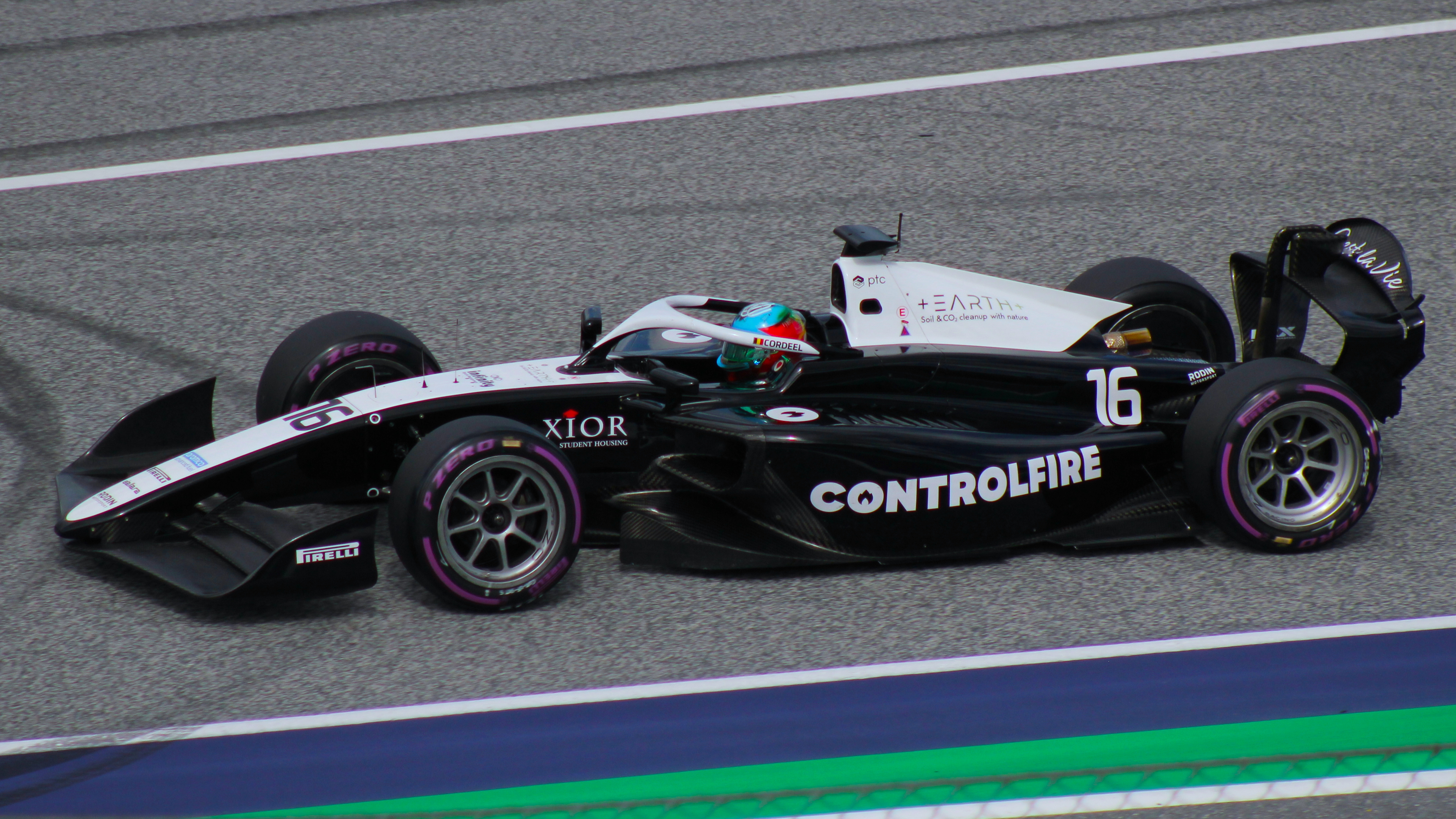
- Cordeel driving the Dallara F2 2024 during the 2025 Spielberg Formula 2 round
- Nationality: (Belgium) Belgian
- Born: 9 July 2002 (age 24) Temse, East Flanders, Belgium

GT World Challenge Europe career
- Debut season: 2026
- Current team: Team WRT
- Categorisation: FIA Silver
- Car number: 31
- Starts: 4
- Wins: 0
- Podiums: 1
- Poles: 0
- Fastest laps: 0
- Best finish: TBD in 2026

Previous series
- 2022–2024 2021 2020 2019–2020 2019–2020 2018 2018 2018 2018 2017–18 2017: FIA Formula 2 FIA Formula 3 Toyota Racing Series; Formula Renault Eurocup; F3 Asian; SMP F4; F4 Spanish; Italian F4; ADAC F4; F4 UAE; French F4

Championship titles
- 2018: F4 Spanish Championship

Amaury Cordeel (Dutch pronunciation: [ˈkɔrdeːl]; born 9 July 2002) is a Belgian racing driver who competes in GT World Challenge Europe for Team WRT.

Cordeel drove four seasons in Formula 2 for Rodin, Hitech, Virtuosi and Van Amersfoort Racing. He previously raced in FIA Formula 3 and Formula Renault Eurocup, and won the 2018 F4 Spanish Championship with MP Motorsport.

== Single-seater career ==
=== Lower formulae ===
Cordeel raced in various types on F4 and made his single seater debut in the 2017 French F4 Championship finishing 16th in the standings with six points. In 2018, he raced in the 2018 SMP F4 Championship finishing eighth in the standings with two wins and four podiums overall. That year, he also raced in the 2018 ADAC Formula 4 Championship with ADAC Berlin-Brandenburg e.V. He finished the championship in 23rd with no points to his name but he only competed in nine races. He then raced in the 2018 Italian F4 Championship with Mucke Motorsport and finished the season 31st in the standings with yet again no points finishes, although he only competed in nine races. Before the real season got underway, Cordeel raced in the 2017–18 Formula 4 UAE Championship with Dragon Motopark F4. He finished the season with a race win and three podiums. Cordeel's final campaign that year was in 2018 Spanish F4 Championship with MP Motorsport. Cordeel took four wins on the way to winning the championship with 208 points. In this extremely tight season, he took the third most wins but was the most consistent driver of the three championship contenders.

=== Formula Renault Eurocup ===
==== 2019 ====
Cordeel made his debut in the Formula Renault Eurocup in 2019 with MP Motorsport. He finished 15th in the standings with 27 points and a best finish of seventh at the race at Paul Ricard.

==== 2020 ====
In 2020, Cordeel stayed in the Eurocup and moved to FA Racing. He yet again finished 15th in the standings with a best result of sixth at Monza.

=== F3 Asian Championship ===
In 2019, Cordeel raced in the 2019 F3 Asian Winter Series with Pinnacle Motorsport. He finished the winter series tenth with a best result of fourth at the Chang International Circuit. He scored a total of 22 points and didn't compete in the final round.

=== FIA Formula 3 Championship ===
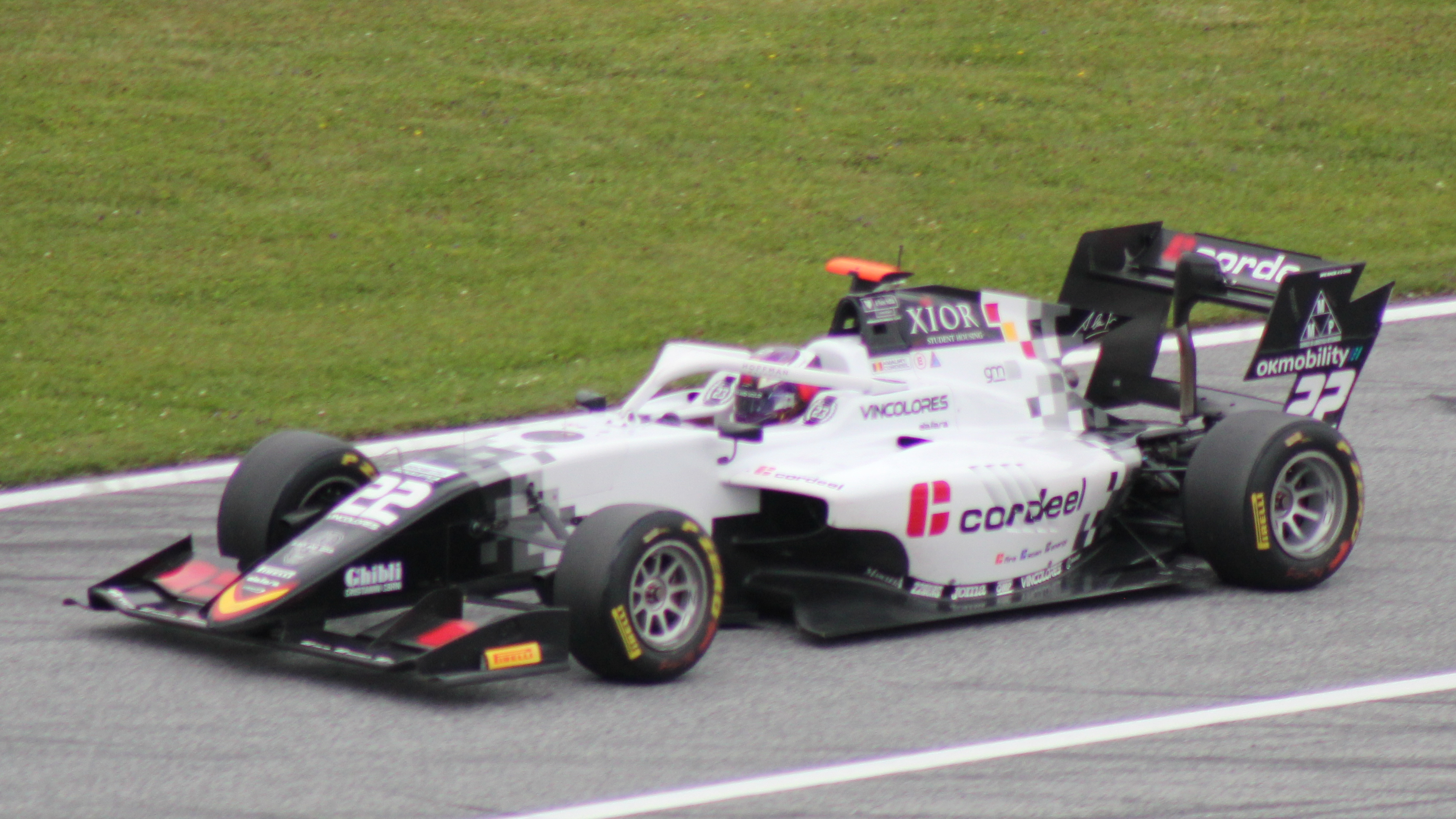
Cordeel driving a Dallara F3 2019 during the 2021 Spielberg Formula 3 round.

Cordeel was announced to race in the 2021 FIA Formula 3 Championship with Campos Racing. At the penultimate round of the season, he qualified in twelfth position, leading to him starting from pole in race one. Cordeel attributed his strong qualifying to him having finally gotten to grips with the tyre degradation. He was unable to use his advantage, as he was involved in a first-lap incident with Alexander Smolyar.

=== FIA Formula 2 Championship ===
==== 2022 ====
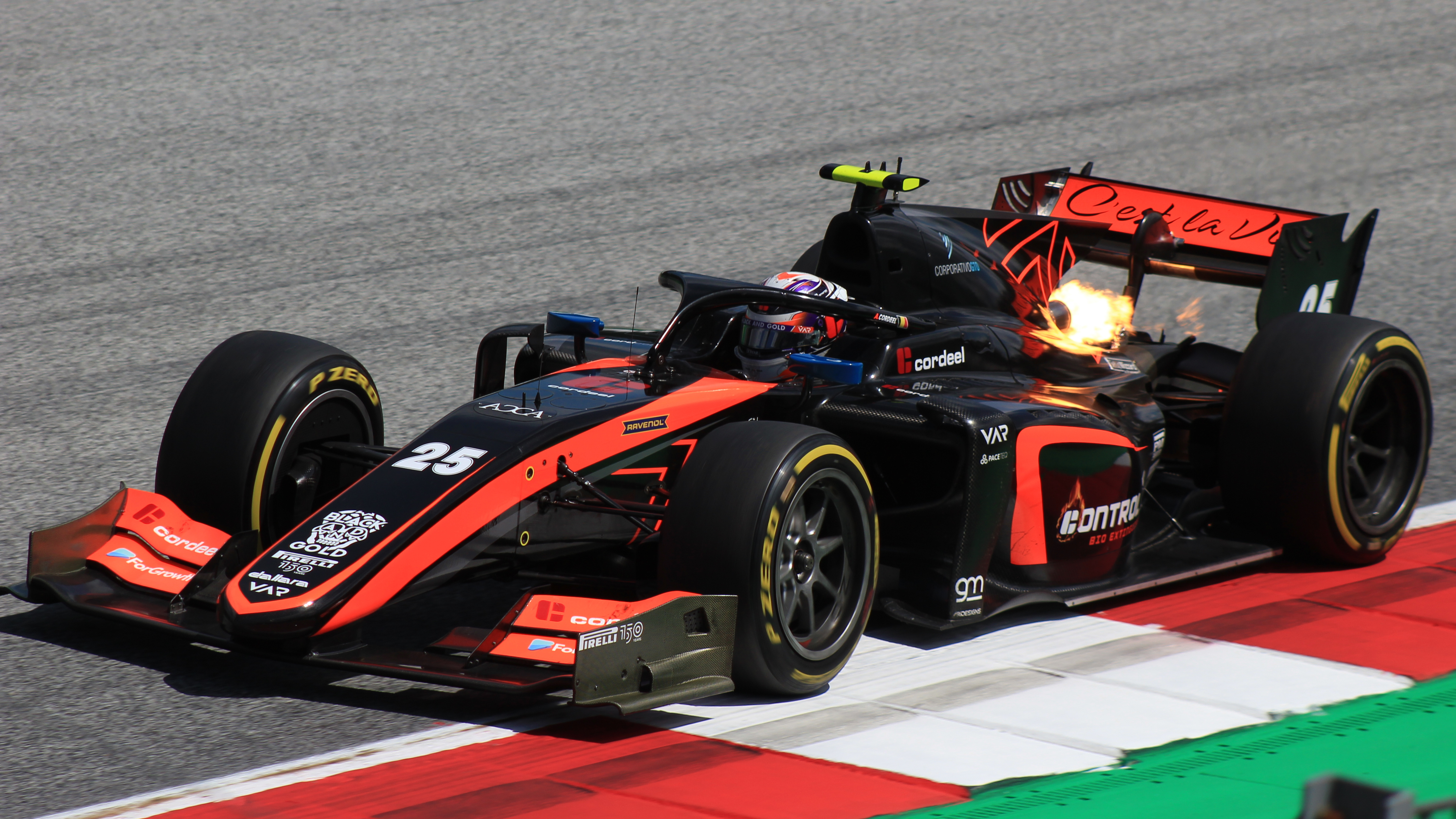
Cordeel driving for Van Amersfoort Racing during the 2022 Spielberg Formula 2 round.

Cordeel took part in 2021 Formula 2 post-season testing with Van Amersfoort Racing. He was later announced as one of the team's drivers for the 2022 season, initially partnering Jake Hughes and later driving alongside David Beckmann and Juan Manuel Correa.

Cordeel finished ninth in his first feature race in Bahrain but was demoted to fifteenth for speeding in the pit lane twice. He then received a ten-place grid penalty and four penalty points for failing to slow for red flags during qualifying in Jeddah. He crashed during the sprint race and was forced to withdraw from the feature race as his car could not be repaired in time. At the Imola round, he crashed on his way to the sprint race grid and failed to start. During the feature race, he was penalised twice for speeding in the pit lane and committed six track limits violations, collecting five more penalty points. At the next race in Barcelona, he received another two penalty points for being out of position on the formation lap, leaving him one point away from a race ban. His Monaco feature race ended after hitting the wall at the final corner. He then received a twelfth penalty point at the Baku feature race for causing a collision with Olli Caldwell, meaning he received a ban from the Silverstone round.

On his return to the series at the Austrian round, Cordeel achieved his highest qualifying result of the year with seventh place. He was classified eighteenth in the sprint race having been handed penalties for track limits violations and overtaking under yellow flag conditions, receiving four more penalty points. Cordeel's form improved after the summer break; he received no further penalty points during the season and scored his first championship points at the Zandvoort feature race, finishing sixth. He followed this with a seventh-place finish at the Monza feature race and points in both races in Abu Dhabi, leaving him 17th in the Drivers' Championship at the conclusion of his debut season.

==== 2023 ====
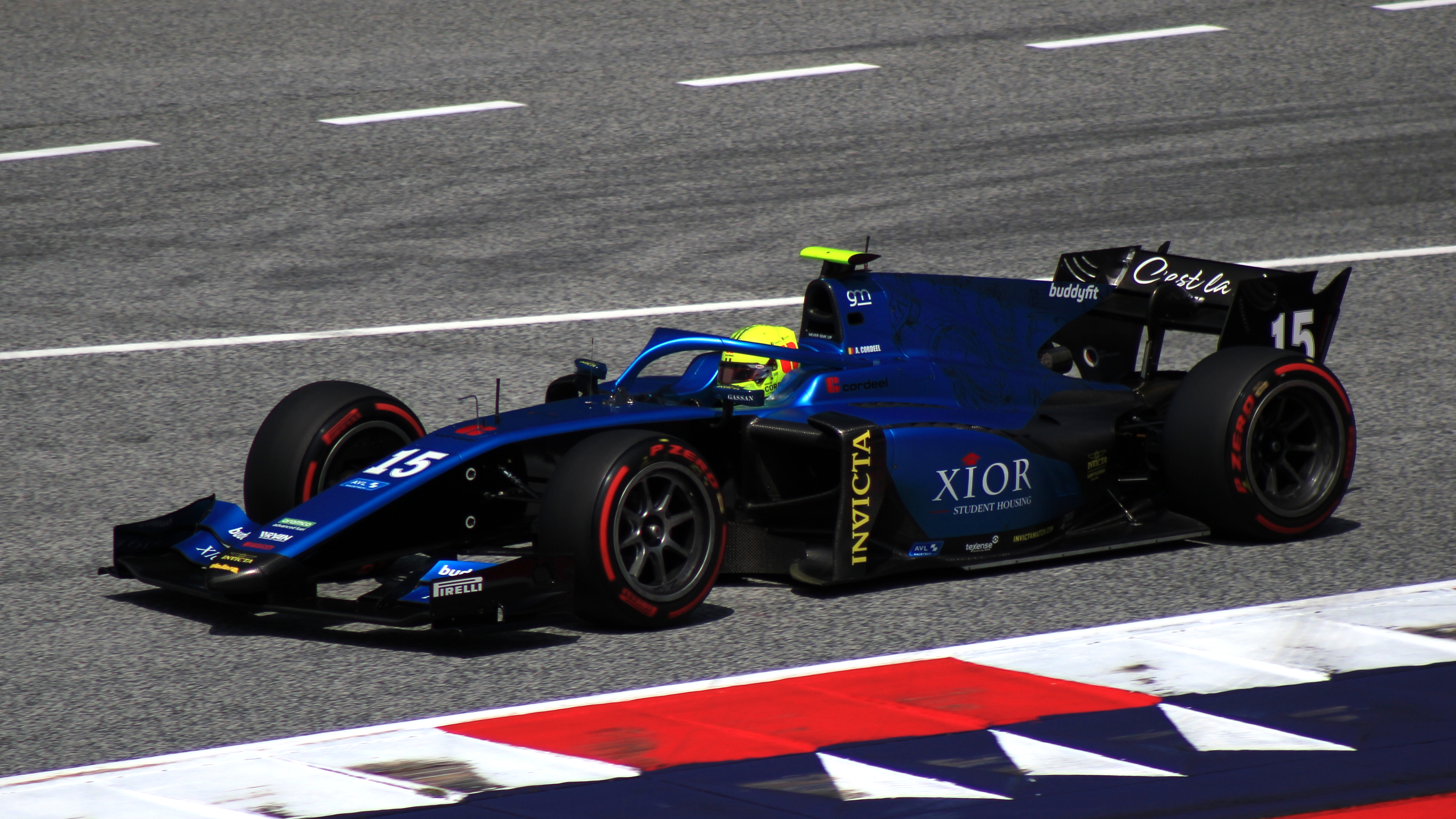
Cordeel driving for Invicta Virtuosi Racing during the 2023 Spielberg Formula 2 round.

After the end of the 2022 season, Cordeel took part in the post-season test with Virtuosi Racing, having been signed to the Infinity Sports Management programme on the previous day. Shortly afterwards, he was announced as a Virtuosi driver, partnering Jack Doohan for the 2023 season. The season brought few returns: despite cleaner on-track behaviour, Cordeel only managed to finish in the points twice, with eighth places at Zandvoort and Monza putting him 20th in the championship, a long way down from teammate Doohan who finished third.

==== 2024 ====
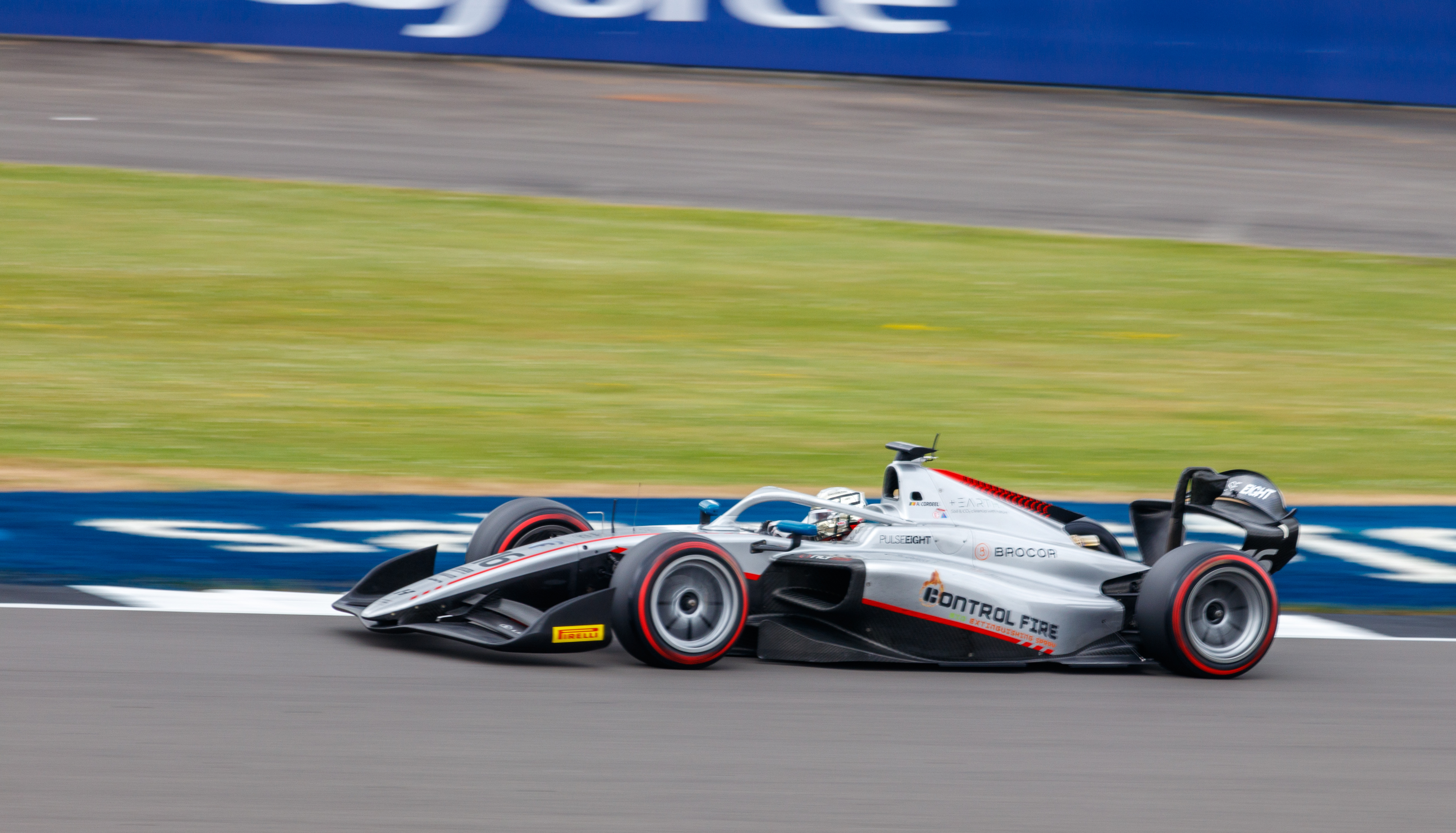
Cordeel driving for Hitech Pulse-Eight during the 2024 Silverstone Formula 2 round

Cordeel switched to Hitech Pulse-Eight for the 2024 season, becoming teammates with Paul Aron. At the opening round of the season, he retired due to an accident. In Jeddah, he qualified last and retired from the sprint race, before finishing fifth in the feature race, his best performance in F2 to date. Cordeel ended the season 17th in the standings with 39 points, once again well behind his teammate, as Aron finished third.

==== 2025 ====
Cordeel was initially left without a Formula 2 seat for the 2025 season. However a week prior to the season opener, Cordeel was drafted in to replace Christian Mansell at Rodin Motorsport for the full season, as the Australian withdrew due to personal reasons. After just scoring three points, he was replaced for the final two rounds by Martinius Stenshorne.

== Sportscar career ==
In 2026, Cordeel joined Belgian outfit Team WRT, driving a BMW M4 GT3 Evo in the Silver Cup class of the GT World Challenge Europe Endurance Cup alongside Matisse Lismont and Ignacio Montenegro, while partnering BMW factory driver Jordan Pepper in the Pro class of the GT World Challenge Europe Sprint Cup.

== Personal life ==
Cordeel was born on 9 July 2002 in Temse, near Sint-Niklaas, Belgium. His family runs Belgian construction company Cordeel Group NV since 1934. His older brother Ghislain is also a racing driver who competed in the Formula Renault Eurocup and the Porsche Supercup.

Cordeel has been charged with speeding twice. In March 2021, he posted a video speeding on a Flemish motorway to his TikTok account, and later apologised claiming it was not him driving the car. In November 2022, he fronted a Belgian court over an incident in 2020 where he was alleged to have been doing 179kph in a 50kph zone, and was given a 6-month road licence suspension and a €3,600 fine.

== Racing record ==
=== Racing career summary ===
Season	Series	Team	Races	Wins	Poles	F/Laps	Podiums	Points	Position
2017	French F4 Championship	FFSA Academy	21	0	0	0	0	6	16th
2017–18	Formula 4 UAE Championship	Dragon Motopark F4	17	1	0	1	3	120	8th
2018	Italian F4 Championship	BWT Mücke Motorsport	6	0	0	0	0	0	31st
2018	Italian F4 Championship	Alma Racing	3	0	0	0	0	0	31st
2018	ADAC Formula 4 Championship	ADAC Berlin-Brandenburg	9	0	0	0	0	0	23rd
2018	SMP F4 Championship	MP Motorsport	12	2	1	2	4	107	8th
2018	F4 Spanish Championship	MP Motorsport	17	4	4	6	12	208	**1st**
2019	Formula Renault Eurocup	MP Motorsport	20	0	0	0	0	27	15th
2019	F3 Asian Winter Series	Pinnacle Motorsport	5	0	0	0	0	22	10th
2019–20	F3 Asian Championship	MP Motorsport	3	0	0	0	0	0	NC†
2020	Formula Renault Eurocup	FA Racing	19	0	0	0	0	33	15th
2020	Toyota Racing Series	Kiwi Motorsport	0	0	0	0	0	0	NC†
2021	FIA Formula 3 Championship	Campos Racing	20	0	0	0	0	0	23rd
2022	FIA Formula 2 Championship	Van Amersfoort Racing	24	0	0	1	0	26	17th
2022	Porsche Carrera Cup Benelux	Team GP Elite	1	0	0	0	0	0	NC†
2023	FIA Formula 2 Championship	Invicta Virtuosi Racing	26	0	0	0	0	8	20th
2024	FIA Formula 2 Championship	Hitech Pulse-Eight	28	0	0	0	0	39	17th
2025	FIA Formula 2 Championship	Rodin Motorsport	23	0	0	0	0	3	19th
2026	GT World Challenge Europe Endurance Cup	Team WRT	5	0	0	0	0	10	24th
2026	GT World Challenge Europe Endurance Cup - Silver	Team WRT	5	1	2	0	4	113	**1st**
2026	GT World Challenge Europe Sprint Cup	Team WRT	10	0	0	0	0	16	20th

^{†} As Cordeel was a guest driver, he was ineligible to score points.
* Season still in progress.

=== Complete French F4 Championship results ===
(key) (Races in bold indicate pole position) (Races in italics indicate fastest lap)

Year	1	2	3	4	5	6	7	8	9	10	11	12	13	14	15	16	17	18	19	20	21	Pos	Points
2017	NOG; 1 Ret	NOG; 2; 16	NOG; 3 Ret	MNZ; 1; 12	MNZ; 2 Ret	MNZ; 3; 9	PAU; 1 Ret	PAU; 2 Ret	PAU; 3; 13	SPA; 1; 15	SPA; 2; 11	SPA; 3; 13	MAG; 1; 14	MAG; 2; 15	MAG; 3; 15	CAT; 1; 16	CAT; 2; 13	CAT; 3; 14	LEC; 1; 15	LEC; 2 Ret	LEC; 3; 13	16th	6

=== Complete Formula 4 UAE Championship results ===
(key) (Races in bold indicate pole position; races in italics indicate fastest lap)

Year	Team	1	2	3	4	5	6	7	8	9	10	11	12	13	14	15	16	17	18	19	20	21	22	23	24	DC	Points
2017–18	Dragon Motopark F4	YMC1; 1	YMC1; 2	YMC1; 3	YMC1; 4	YMC2; 1 Ret	YMC2; 2; 6	YMC2; 3 Ret	YMC2; 4 DNS	DUB1; 1 DSQ	DUB1; 2; 4	DUB1; 3; 3	DUB1; 4 C	YMC3; 1; 10	YMC3; 2; 7	YMC3; 3 Ret	YMC3; 4; 5	YMC4; 1; 3	YMC4; 2; 1	YMC4; 3; 7	YMC4; 4; 5	DUB2; 1; 4	DUB2; 2 DNS	DUB2; 3 Ret	DUB2; 4 DNS	8th	120

=== Complete F4 Spanish Championship results ===
(key) (Races in bold indicate pole position; races in italics indicate points for the fastest lap of top ten finishers)

Year	Entrant	1	2	3	4	5	6	7	8	9	10	11	12	13	14	15	16	17	18	DC	Points
2018	MP Motorsport	ARA; 1 DSQ	ARA; 2; 3	**ARA**; **3**; 6	**CRT**; **1**; 3	CRT; 2; 11†	CRT; 3; 3	ALG; 1; 1	ALG; 2; 2	ALG; 3; 3	CAT; 1 C	**CAT**; **2**; 2	JER; 1; 2	**JER**; **2**; 2	**JER**; **3**; 1	NAV; 1; 2	**NAV**; **2**; 1	NAV; 3; 11	NAV; 4; 7	1st	208

=== Complete Italian F4 Championship results ===
(key) (Races in bold indicate pole position) (Races in italics indicate fastest lap)

Year	Team	1	2	3	4	5	6	7	8	9	10	11	12	13	14	15	16	17	18	19	20	21	Pos	Points
2018	BWT Mücke Motorsport	ADR; 1	ADR; 2	ADR; 3	LEC; 1	LEC; 2	LEC; 3	MNZ; 1; 14	MNZ; 2; 13	MNZ; 3; 14	MIS; 1; 15	MIS; 2 Ret	MIS; 3; 16	IMO; 1	IMO; 2	IMO; 3	VLL; 1	VLL; 2	VLL; 3				31st	0
2018	Alma Racing																			MUG; 1; 23	MUG; 2; 12	MUG; 3; 13	31st	0

=== Complete ADAC Formula 4 Championship results ===
(key) (Races in bold indicate pole position) (Races in italics indicate fastest lap)

Year	Team	1	2	3	4	5	6	7	8	9	10	11	12	13	14	15	16	17	18	19	20	Pos	Points
2018	ADAC Berlin-Brandenburg	OSC; 1	OSC; 2	OSC; 3	HOC1; 1	HOC1; 2	HOC1; 3	LAU; 1	LAU; 2	LAU; 3	RBR; 1 Ret	RBR; 2 Ret	RBR; 3; 15	HOC2; 1; 21	HOC2; 2; 17	NÜR; 1	NÜR; 2	NÜR; 3	HOC3; 1	HOC3; 2	HOC3; 3	23rd	0

=== Complete SMP F4 Championship results ===
(key) (Races in bold indicate pole position) (Races in italics indicate fastest lap)

Year	Team	1	2	3	4	5	6	7	8	9	10	11	12	13	14	15	16	17	18	19	20	21	Pos	Points
2018	SMP Racing	SMO; 1	SMO; 2	SMO; 3	NRG; 1	NRG; 2	NRG; 3	MSC; 1; 6	MSC; 2; 9	MSC; 3; 6	ADM; 1; 4	ADM; 2; 6	**ADM**; **3**; 1	AHV; 1 Ret	AHV; 2; 9	AHV; 3; 9	ALA; 1	ALA; 2	ALA; 3	ASS; 1; 2	ASS; 2; 1	ASS; 3; 3	8th	107

=== Complete Formula Renault Eurocup results ===
(key) (Races in bold indicate pole position) (Races in italics indicate fastest lap)

Year	Team	1	2	3	4	5	6	7	8	9	10	11	12	13	14	15	16	17	18	19	20	Pos	Points
2019	MP Motorsport	MNZ; 1; 17	MNZ; 2; 9	SIL; 1; 13	SIL; 2; 13	MON; 1 Ret	MON; 2; 13	LEC; 1 Ret	LEC; 2; 7	SPA; 1; 14	SPA; 2; 21	NÜR; 1; 8	NÜR; 2; 11	HUN; 1; 5	HUN; 2 Ret	CAT; 1; 12	CAT; 2; 13	HOC; 1; 15	HOC; 2; 8	YMC; 1; 9	YMC; 2; 9	15th	27
2020	FA Racing	MNZ; 1; 6	MNZ; 2 Ret	IMO; 1; 11	IMO; 2; 10	NÜR; 1; 9	NÜR; 2; 10	MAG; 1 Ret	MAG; 2; 9	ZAN; 1; 5	ZAN; 2 DNS	CAT; 1; 13	CAT; 2; 13	SPA; 1; 6‡	SPA; 2; 10	IMO; 1; 14	IMO; 2; 13	HOC; 1; 12	HOC; 2; 11	LEC; 1; 13	LEC; 2; 10	15th	33

^{‡} Half points awarded as less than 75% of race distance was completed.

=== Complete F3 Asian Winter Series results ===
(key) (Races in bold indicate pole position) (Races in italics indicate fastest lap)

Year	Team	1	2	3	4	5	6	7	8	9	Pos	Points
2019	Pinnacle Motorsport	CHA; 1; 6	CHA; 2; 9	CHA; 3; 4	SEP1; 1 DNS	SEP1; 2 Ret	SEP1; 3; 11	SEP2; 1	SEP2; 2	SEP2; 3	10th	22

=== Complete F3 Asian Championship results ===
(key) (Races in bold indicate pole position) (Races in italics indicate fastest lap)

Year	Team	1	2	3	4	5	6	7	8	9	10	11	12	13	14	15	DC	Points
2019–20	MP Motorsport	SEP; 1	SEP; 2	SEP; 3	DUB; 1; 10	DUB; 2; 7	DUB; 3; 10	ABU; 1	ABU; 2	ABU; 3	SEP; 1	SEP; 2	SEP; 3	CHA; 1	CHA; 2	CHA; 3	NC†	0

^{†} As Cordeel was a guest driver, he was ineligible to score points.

=== Complete Toyota Racing Series results ===
(key) (Races in bold indicate pole position) (Races in italics indicate fastest lap)

Year	Team	1	2	3	4	5	6	7	8	9	10	11	12	13	14	15	DC	Points
2020	Kiwi Motorsport	HIG; 1 WD	HIG; 2 WD	HIG; 3 WD	TER; 1	TER; 2	TER; 3	HMP; 1	HMP; 2	HMP; 3	PUK; 1	PUK; 2	PUK; 3	MAN; 1	MAN; 2	MAN; 3	NC	0

=== Complete FIA Formula 3 Championship results ===
(key) (Races in bold indicate pole position; races in italics indicate points for the fastest lap of top ten finishers)

Year	Entrant	1	2	3	4	5	6	7	8	9	10	11	12	13	14	15	16	17	18	19	20	21	DC	Points
2021	Campos Racing	CAT; 1; 26	CAT; 2; 16	CAT; 3; 25	LEC; 1; 27	LEC; 2; 24	LEC; 3; 25	RBR; 1; 22	RBR; 2; 11	RBR; 3; 18	HUN; 1; 19	HUN; 2 Ret	HUN; 3; 26	SPA; 1; 17	SPA; 2 Ret	SPA; 3 Ret	ZAN; 1; 23	ZAN; 2 Ret	ZAN; 3; 12	SOC; 1; 21	SOC; 2 C	SOC; 3; 16	23rd	0

=== Complete FIA Formula 2 Championship results ===
(key) (Races in bold indicate pole position; races in italics indicate points for the fastest lap of top ten finishers)

Year	Entrant	1	2	3	4	5	6	7	8	9	10	11	12	13	14	15	16	17	18	19	20	21	22	23	24	25	26	27	28	DC	Points
2022	Van Amersfoort Racing	BHR; SPR; 17	BHR; FEA; 15	JED; SPR; Ret	JED; FEA; WD	IMO; SPR; DNS	IMO; FEA; 17	CAT; SPR; 19	CAT; FEA; 15	MCO; SPR; 17	MCO; FEA; Ret	BAK; SPR; 13	BAK; FEA; Ret	SIL; SPR	SIL; FEA	RBR; SPR; 18	RBR; FEA; 18	LEC; SPR; Ret	LEC; FEA; 15	HUN; SPR; 13	HUN; FEA; 17	SPA; SPR; 18	SPA; FEA; 17	ZAN; SPR; 12	ZAN; FEA; 6	MNZ; SPR; 15	MNZ; FEA; 7	YMC; SPR; 5	YMC; FEA; 6	17th	26
2023	Invicta Virtuosi Racing	BHR; SPR; 21	BHR; SPR; 15	JED; SPR; 19	JED; FEA; 20	MEL; SPR; 12	MEL; FEA; 13	BAK; SPR; 9	BAK; FEA; 19	MCO; SPR; Ret	MCO; FEA; NC	CAT; SPR; 17	CAT; FEA; 19	RBR; SPR; 15	RBR; FEA; 17	SIL; SPR; 16	SIL; FEA; Ret	HUN; SPR; 19	HUN; FEA; 21	SPA; SPR; Ret	SPA; FEA; 15	ZAN; SPR; 16	ZAN; FEA; 8	MNZ; SPR; Ret	MNZ; FEA; 8	YMC; SPR; 17	YMC; FEA; 16			20th	8
2024	Hitech Pulse-Eight	BHR; SPR; Ret	BHR; FEA; Ret	JED; SPR; Ret	JED; FEA; 5	MEL; SPR; 16	MEL; FEA; 11	IMO; SPR; 4	IMO; FEA; Ret	MON; SPR; 14	MON; FEA; Ret	CAT; SPR; 14	CAT; FEA; 8	RBR; SPR; 18	RBR; FEA; 7	SIL; SPR; 15	SIL; FEA; 15	HUN; SPR; 20	HUN; FEA; Ret	SPA; SPR; 11	SPA; FEA; 8	MNZ; SPR; 12	MNZ; FEA; 18	BAK; SPR; 18	BAK; FEA; 12	LSL; SPR; 16	LSL; FEA; 7	YMC; SPR; 13	YMC; FEA; 8	17th	39
2025	Rodin Motorsport	MEL; SPR; 15	MEL; FEA; C	BHR; SPR; 11	BHR; FEA; 13	JED; SPR; 14	JED; FEA; 15	IMO; SPR; 20	IMO; FEA; 15	MON; SPR; 14	MON; FEA; 8	CAT; SPR; 10	CAT; FEA; 13	RBR; SPR; 13†	RBR; FEA; Ret	SIL; SPR; 19	SIL; FEA; 17	SPA; SPR; Ret	SPA; FEA; 10	HUN; SPR; 16	HUN; FEA; Ret	MNZ; SPR; 17	MNZ; FEA; 13	BAK; SPR; 16	BAK; FEA; 16	LSL; SPR	LSL; FEA	YMC; SPR	YMC; FEA	19th	3

=== Complete GT World Challenge Europe results ===
==== GT World Challenge Europe Endurance Cup ====
(key) (Races in bold indicate pole position) (Races in italics indicate fastest lap)

Year	Team	Car	Class	1	2	3	4	5	6	7	Pos.	Points
2026	Team WRT	BMW M4 GT3 Evo	Silver	LEC; 18	MNZ; 17	SPA; 6H; 24	SPA; 12H; 20	SPA; 24H; 15	**NÜR**; 14	ALG; 5	1st	113

==== GT World Challenge Europe Sprint Cup ====
(key) (Races in bold indicate pole position) (Races in italics indicate fastest lap)

Year	Team	Car	Class	1	2	3	4	5	6	7	8	9	10	Pos.	Points
2026	Team WRT	BMW M4 GT3 Evo	Pro	BRH; 1; 4	BRH; 2; 7	MIS; 1; 7	MIS; 2; 10	MAG; 1; 20	MAG; 2; 11	ZAN; 1 Ret	ZAN; 2 Ret	CAT; 1; 11	CAT; 2; 8	20th	16
