= 2023 Zandvoort Formula 2 round =

Motor racing event

(Netherlands) 2023 Zandvoort Formula 2 round
Round details
- Round 11 of 13 in the 2023 FIA Formula 2 Championship.
- Location: Circuit Zandvoort; Zandvoort, Netherlands
- Course: Permanent racing facility 4.259 km (2.646 mi)

Sprint Race
- Date: 26 August 2023
- Laps: 2 (Note: The race was scheduled to run for 29 laps, but was red-flagged after a collision, however, due to torrential rain, the race was red-flagged a second time and called off.)
Podium
First	(France) Isack Hadjar	Hitech Pulse-Eight
Second	(France) Victor Martins	ART Grand Prix
Third	(United Kingdom) Oliver Bearman	Prema Racing
Fastest lap

Feature Race
- Date: 27 August 2023
- Laps: 40
Podium
First	(France) Clément Novalak	Trident
Second	(Barbados) Zane Maloney	Rodin Carlin
Third	(United States) Jak Crawford	Hitech Pulse-Eight
Fastest lap
Driver	(France) Clément Novalak	Trident
- Time: 1:23.816 (on lap 20)

The 2023 Zandvoort Formula 2 round was a motor racing event held between 25 and 27 August 2023 at the Circuit Zandvoort. It was the eleventh round of the 2023 Formula 2 Championship and was held in support of the 2023 Dutch Grand Prix.

== Classification ==
=== Qualifying ===
Pos.	No.	Driver	Entrant	Time	Grid SR	Grid FR
1	9	(United States) Jak Crawford	Hitech Pulse-Eight	1:21.210	10	1
2	1	(Norway) Dennis Hauger	MP Motorsport	+0.034	9	2
3	7	(Denmark) Frederik Vesti	Prema Racing	+0.112	8	3
4	3	(Barbados) Zane Maloney	Rodin Carlin	+0.127	7	4
5	14	(Australia) Jack Doohan	Invicta Virtuosi Racing	+0.148	6	5
6	8	(United Kingdom) Oliver Bearman	Prema Racing	+0.207	5	6
7	23	(United States) Juan Manuel Correa	Van Amersfoort Racing	+0.227	4	7
8	6	(France) Victor Martins	ART Grand Prix	+0.232	3	8
9	10	(France) Isack Hadjar	Hitech Pulse-Eight	+0.249	2	9
10	5	(France) Théo Pourchaire	ART Grand Prix	+0.287	1	10
11	24	(India) Kush Maini	Campos Racing	+0.341	11	11
12	11	(Japan) Ayumu Iwasa	DAMS	+0.388	16^{1}	12
13	21	(France) Clément Novalak	Trident	+0.389	12	13
14	22	(Netherlands) Richard Verschoor	Van Amersfoort Racing	+0.407	17^{2}	14
15	25	(Switzerland) Ralph Boschung	Campos Racing	+0.493	13	15
16	2	(India) Jehan Daruvala	MP Motorsport	+0.515	14	16
17	12	(Monaco) Arthur Leclerc	DAMS	+0.735	15	17
18	15	(Belgium) Amaury Cordeel	Invicta Virtuosi Racing	+0.751	18	18
19	4	(Brazil) Enzo Fittipaldi	Rodin Carlin	+0.792	19	19
20	20	(Czech Republic) Roman Staněk	Trident	+0.800	20	20
21	16	(Israel) Roy Nissany	PHM Racing by Charouz	+1.563	21	21
22	17	(United Kingdom) Josh Mason	PHM Racing by Charouz	+2.553	22	22

Notes

- ^1 - Ayumu Iwasa received a five-place grid penalty for causing a collision with Dennis Hauger at the Spa-Francorchamps feature race.
- ^2 - Richard Verschoor was handed a three-place grid penalty for impeding Zane Maloney in qualifying.

=== Sprint race ===
Pos.	No.	Driver	Entrant	Laps	Time/Retired	Grid	Points (Note: No points were awarded as a result of less than two racing laps being completed.)
1	10	(France) Isack Hadjar	Hitech Pulse-Eight	2	4:59.002	2	
2	6	(France) Victor Martins	ART Grand Prix	2	+2.013	3	
3	8	(United Kingdom) Oliver Bearman	Prema Racing	2	+5.120	5	
4	23	(United States) Juan Manuel Correa	Van Amersfoort Racing	2	+6.533	4	
5	3	(Barbados) Zane Maloney	Rodin Carlin	2	+8.650	7	
6	14	(Australia) Jack Doohan	Invicta Virtuosi Racing	2	+11.543	6	
7	7	(Denmark) Frederik Vesti	Prema Racing	2	+14.158	8	
8	21	(France) Clément Novalak	Trident	2	+16.650	12	
9	1	(Norway) Dennis Hauger	MP Motorsport	2	+18.594	9	
10	2	(India) Jehan Daruvala	MP Motorsport	2	+20.436	14	
11	12	(Monaco) Arthur Leclerc	DAMS	2	+22.494	15	
12	22	(Netherlands) Richard Verschoor	Van Amersfoort Racing	2	+24.027	17	
13	11	(Japan) Ayumu Iwasa	DAMS	2	+27.263	16	
14	20	(Czech Republic) Roman Staněk	Trident	2	+29.946	20	
15	4	(Brazil) Enzo Fittipaldi	Rodin Carlin	2	+33.292	19	
16	15	(Belgium) Amaury Cordeel	Invicta Virtuosi Racing	2	+35.607	18	
17	16	(Israel) Roy Nissany	PHM Racing by Charouz	2	+39.107	21	
18	17	(United Kingdom) Josh Mason	PHM Racing by Charouz	2	+46.664	22	
19	5	(France) Théo Pourchaire	ART Grand Prix	2	+53.755	1	
Ret	9	(United States) Jak Crawford	Hitech Pulse-Eight	0	Collision damage	10	
Ret	24	(India) Kush Maini	Campos Racing	0	Collision	11	
Ret	25	(Switzerland) Ralph Boschung	Campos Racing	0	Collision	13	
Notes: The race was abandoned due to wet weather and no points were awarded. Source:

=== Feature race ===
Pos.	No.	Driver	Team	Laps	Time/Gap	Grid	Pts.
1	21	(France) Clément Novalak	Trident	38	1:01:36.125	13	25 (1)
2	3	(Barbados) Zane Maloney	Rodin Carlin	38	+2.183	4	18
3	9	(United States) Jak Crawford	Hitech Pulse-Eight	38	+2.525	1	15 (2)
4	22	(Netherlands) Richard Verschoor	Van Amersfoort Racing	38	+3.197	14	12
5	1	(Norway) Dennis Hauger	MP Motorsport	38	+11.695	2	10
6	10	(France) Isack Hadjar	Hitech Pulse-Eight	38	+13.706	9	8
7	4	(Brazil) Enzo Fittipaldi	Rodin Carlin	38	+17.646	19	6
8	15	(Belgium) Amaury Cordeel	Invicta Virtuosi Racing	38	+20.586	18	4
9	6	(France) Victor Martins	ART Grand Prix	38	+20.879^{1}	8	2
10	23	(United States) Juan Manuel Correa	Van Amersfoort Racing	38	+23.032	7	1
11	20	(Czech Republic) Roman Staněk	Trident	38	+33.147	20	
12	16	(Israel) Roy Nissany	PHM Racing by Charouz	38	+34.673	21	
13	11	(Japan) Ayumu Iwasa	DAMS	38	+37.644	12	
14	12	(Monaco) Arthur Leclerc	DAMS	38	+39.464	17	
15	17	(United Kingdom) Josh Mason	PHM Racing by Charouz	38	+45.146	22	
16	25	(Switzerland) Ralph Boschung	Campos Racing	38	+45.548^{2}	15	
17	2	(India) Jehan Daruvala	MP Motorsport	38	+47.377^{2}	16	
18	24	(India) Kush Maini	Campos Racing	38	+1:17.127	11	
DNF	8	(United Kingdom) Oliver Bearman	Prema Racing	17	Collision damage	6	
DNF	7	(Denmark) Frederik Vesti	Prema Racing	10	Lost wheels	3	
DNF	5	(France) Théo Pourchaire	ART Grand Prix	9	Accident	10	
DNS	14	(Australia) Jack Doohan	Invicta Virtuosi Racing	0	Spun off	5	
Fastest lap set by: (France) Clément Novalak – 1:23.816 (lap 20)

Notes

- ^1 - Victor Martins originally finished fifth, but was handed a ten-second time penalty for forcing Oliver Bearman off track, dropping him down to ninth.
- ^2 - Ralph Boschung and Jehan Daruvala were both given five-second time penalties for committing safety car infringements.

== Standings after the event ==
Drivers' Championship standings

Pos.	Driver	Points
1	(France) Théo Pourchaire	168
2	(Denmark) Frederik Vesti	156
3	(Japan) Ayumu Iwasa	134
4	(Australia) Jack Doohan	130
5	(France) Victor Martins	122

Teams' Championship standings

Pos.	Team	Points
1	(France) ART Grand Prix	290
2	(Italy) Prema Racing	258
3	(United Kingdom) Rodin Carlin	200
4	(France) DAMS	173
5	(Netherlands) MP Motorsport	145

- Note: Only the top five positions are included for both sets of standings.

== See also ==
- 2023 Dutch Grand Prix

== Notes ==
Previous round: 2023 Spa-Francorchamps Formula 2 round	FIA Formula 2 Championship; 2023 season	Next round: 2023 Monza Formula 2 round
Previous round: 2022 Zandvoort Formula 2 round	Zandvoort Formula 2 round	Next round: none
