= 2023 Spa-Francorchamps Formula 2 round =

(Belgium) 2023 Spa-Francorchamps Formula 2 round
Round details
- Round 10 of 13 in the 2023 FIA Formula 2 Championship.
- Layout of the Circuit de Spa-Francorchamps
- Location: Circuit de Spa-Francorchamps, Stavelot, Belgium
- Course: Permanent racing facility 7.004 km (4.352 mi)

Sprint Race
- Date: 29 July 2023
- Laps: 17 (Note: Sprint race has been shortened from 18 to 17 laps after the initial start was aborted, resulting into another formation lap.)
Podium
First	(Brazil) Enzo Fittipaldi	Rodin Carlin
Second	(France) Théo Pourchaire	ART Grand Prix
Third	(Norway) Dennis Hauger	MP Motorsport
Fastest lap
Driver	(Brazil) Enzo Fittipaldi	Rodin Carlin
- Time: 2:03.608 (on lap 5)

Feature Race
- Date: 30 July 2023
- Laps: 25
Pole position
Driver	(United Kingdom) Oliver Bearman	Prema Racing
Time	2:05.736	
Podium
First	(Australia) Jack Doohan	Invicta Virtuosi Racing
Second	(France) Théo Pourchaire	ART Grand Prix
Third	(Brazil) Enzo Fittipaldi	Rodin Carlin
Fastest lap
Driver	(Australia) Jack Doohan	Invicta Virtuosi Racing
- Time: 1:59.871 (on lap 23)

The 2023 Spa-Francorchamps Formula 2 round was a motor racing event held between 28 and 30 July 2023 at the Circuit de Spa-Francorchamps, Stavelot, Belgium. It was the tenth race of the 2023 Formula 2 Championship and was held in support of the 2023 Belgian Grand Prix.

== Driver changes ==
Prior to the round at the Spa-Francorchamps, PHM Racing by Charouz announced that Euroformula Open racer Josh Mason had taken over Brad Benavides' seat for the round at Spa-Francorchamps.

== Classification ==
=== Qualifying ===
Pos.	No.	Driver	Team	Time/Gap	Grid SR	Grid FR
1	8	(United Kingdom) Oliver Bearman	Prema Racing	2:05.736	10	1
2	7	(Denmark) Frederik Vesti	Prema Racing	+0.463	9	2
3	6	(France) Victor Martins	ART Grand Prix	+1.703	8	3
4	3	(Barbados) Zane Maloney	Rodin Carlin	+2.061	7	4
5	5	(France) Théo Pourchaire	ART Grand Prix	+3.300	6	5
6	1	(Norway) Dennis Hauger	MP Motorsport	+3.318	5	6
7	25	(Switzerland) Ralph Boschung	Campos Racing	+3.805	4	7
8	4	(Brazil) Enzo Fittipaldi	Rodin Carlin	+4.082	3	8
9	22	(Netherlands) Richard Verschoor	Van Amersfoort Racing	+4.173	2	9
10	2	(India) Jehan Daruvala	MP Motorsport	+4.248	1	10
11	14	(Australia) Jack Doohan	Invicta Virtuosi Racing	+4.846	11	11
12	9	(United States) Jak Crawford	Hitech Pulse-Eight	+5.942	12	12
13	10	(France) Isack Hadjar	Hitech Pulse-Eight	+6.106	13	13
14	16	(Israel) Roy Nissany	PHM Racing by Charouz	+6.156	14	14
15	12	(Monaco) Arthur Leclerc	DAMS	+6.314	15	15
16	11	(Japan) Ayumu Iwasa	DAMS	+6.667	16	16
17	21	(France) Clément Novalak	Trident	+7.061	17	17
18	20	(Czech Republic) Roman Staněk	Trident	+7.789	18	18
107% time: 2:14.537 (+8.801)
—	24	(India) Kush Maini	Campos Racing	+8.913	19	19
—	23	(United States) Juan Manuel Correa	Van Amersfoort Racing	No Time	22^{1}	20
—	15	(Belgium) Amaury Cordeel	Invicta Virtuosi Racing	No Time	20	21
—	17	(United Kingdom) Josh Mason	PHM Racing by Charouz	No Time	21	22

Notes:

- ^1 – Juan Manuel Correa was handed a three-place grid penalty for the sprint race for impeding Invicta Virtuosi Racing driver Jack Doohan in qualifying.

=== Sprint Race ===
Pos.	No.	Driver	Team	Laps	Time/Gap	Grid	Pts.
1	4	(Brazil) Enzo Fittipaldi	Rodin Carlin	17	37:30.579	3	10 (1)
2	5	(France) Théo Pourchaire	ART Grand Prix	17	+5.125	6	8
3	1	(Norway) Dennis Hauger	MP Motorsport	17	+5.903	5	6
4	6	(France) Victor Martins	ART Grand Prix	17	+6.710	8	5
5	14	(Australia) Jack Doohan	Invicta Virtuosi Racing	17	+12.784	11	4
6	7	(Denmark) Frederik Vesti	Prema Racing	17	+15.333	9	3
7	11	(Japan) Ayumu Iwasa	DAMS	17	+15.521	16	2
8	25	(Switzerland) Ralph Boschung	Campos Racing	17	+16.250	4	1
9	12	(Monaco) Arthur Leclerc	DAMS	17	+18.454	15	
10	3	(Barbados) Zane Maloney	Rodin Carlin	17	+22.825^{1}	7	
11	10	(France) Isack Hadjar	Hitech Pulse-Eight	17	+23.064	13	
12	8	(United Kingdom) Oliver Bearman	Prema Racing	17	+26.037	10	
13	16	(Israel) Roy Nissany	PHM Racing by Charouz	17	+26.996	14	
14	9	(United States) Jak Crawford	Hitech Pulse-Eight	17	+27.618	12	
15	20	(Czech Republic) Roman Staněk	Trident	17	+29.205	18	
16	23	(United States) Juan Manuel Correa	Van Amersfoort Racing	17	+31.363	22	
17	21	(France) Clément Novalak	Trident	17	+55.688	17	
18	24	(India) Kush Maini	Campos Racing	17	+57.434	19	
19	17	(United Kingdom) Josh Mason	PHM Racing by Charouz	17	+1:42.400	PL	
DNF	2	(India) Jehan Daruvala	MP Motorsport	2	Loose headrest	1	
DNF	15	(Belgium) Amaury Cordeel	Invicta Virtuosi Racing	1	Spun off	20	
DSQ	22	(Netherlands) Richard Verschoor	Van Amersfoort Racing	17	Disqualified^{2}	2	
Fastest lap set by: (Brazil) Enzo Fittipaldi – 2:03.608 (Lap 5)

Notes:

- ^1 - Zane Maloney received a 5-second time penalty for track limits violations.
- ^2 - Richard Verschoor originally finished in second, but has been disqualified for an illegal throttle mapping.

=== Feature Race ===
Pos.	No.	Driver	Team	Laps	Time/Gap	Grid	Pts.
1	14	(Australia) Jack Doohan	Invicta Virtuosi Racing	25	59:01.766	11	25 (1)
2	5	(France) Théo Pourchaire	ART Grand Prix	25	+1.952	5	18
3	4	(Brazil) Enzo Fittipaldi	Rodin Carlin	25	+9.118	8	15
4	3	(Barbados) Zane Maloney	Rodin Carlin	25	+10.131	4	12
5	6	(France) Victor Martins	ART Grand Prix	25	+10.528^{1}	3	10
6	22	(Netherlands) Richard Verschoor	Van Amersfoort Racing	25	+10.578	9	8
7	8	(United Kingdom) Oliver Bearman	Prema Racing	25	+12.701^{2}	1	6 (2)
8	24	(India) Kush Maini	Campos Racing	25	+13.782	19	4
9	20	(Czech Republic) Roman Staněk	Trident	25	+16.526	18	2
10	25	(Switzerland) Ralph Boschung	Campos Racing	25	+17.637	7	1
11	12	(Monaco) Arthur Leclerc	DAMS	25	+18.998	15	
12	16	(Israel) Roy Nissany	PHM Racing by Charouz	25	+20.664	14	
13	21	(France) Clément Novalak	Trident	25	+23.852^{3}	17	
14	17	(United Kingdom) Josh Mason	PHM Racing by Charouz	25	+25.253	22	
15	15	(Belgium) Amaury Cordeel	Invicta Virtuosi Racing	25	+27.900	21	
16	23	(United States) Juan Manuel Correa	Van Amersfoort Racing	25	+29.782^{4}	20	
DNF	9	(United States) Jak Crawford	Hitech Pulse-Eight	15	Collision	12	
DNF	2	(India) Jehan Daruvala	MP Motorsport	14	Accident	10	
DNF	10	(France) Isack Hadjar	Hitech Pulse-Eight	11	Accident	13	
DSQ	1	(Norway) Dennis Hauger	MP Motorsport	5	Disqualified^{5}	6	
DNF	11	(Japan) Ayumu Iwasa	DAMS	1	Suspension	16	
DNS	7	(Denmark) Frederik Vesti	Prema Racing	—	Did not start^{6}	2	
Fastest lap set by: (Australia) Jack Doohan – 1:59.871 (lap 23)

Notes:

- ^1 - Victor Martins received a 5-second time penalty for speeding in the pitlane.
- ^2 - Oliver Bearman received a 5-second time penalty for causing a collision with Victor Martins.
- ^3 - Clément Novalak received a 5-second time penalty for crossing the line at pit exit.
- ^4 - Juan Manuel Correa received a 10-second time penalty for causing a collision with Jak Crawford.
- ^5 - Dennis Hauger has been disqualified during the race for rejoining the track after being pushed by track marshals.
- ^6 - Frederik Vesti crashed out on the reconnaissance lap and was therefore unable to start the race.

== Standings after the event ==
Drivers' Championship standings

	Pos.	Driver	Points
1	1	(France) Théo Pourchaire	168
1	2	(Denmark) Frederik Vesti	156
	3	(Japan) Ayumu Iwasa	133
1	4	(Australia) Jack Doohan	130
1	5	(France) Victor Martins	120

Teams' Championship standings

	Pos.	Team	Points
1	1	(France) ART Grand Prix	288
1	2	(Italy) Prema Racing	258
1	3	(United Kingdom) Rodin Carlin	176
1	4	(France) DAMS	173
	5	(Netherlands) MP Motorsport	135

- Note: Only the top five positions are included for both sets of standings

== See also ==
- 2023 Belgian Grand Prix
- 2023 Spa-Francorchamps Formula 3 round

== Notes ==
Previous round: 2023 Budapest Formula 2 round	FIA Formula 2 Championship; 2023 season	Next round: 2023 Zandvoort Formula 2 round
Previous round: 2022 Spa-Francorchamps Formula 2 round	Spa-Francorchamps Formula 2 round	Next round: 2024 Spa-Francorchamps Formula 2 round
