= 2023 Yas Island Formula 2 round =

Motor racing event in Abu Dhabi

(United Arab Emirates) 2023 Yas Island Formula 2 round
Round details
- Round 13 of 13 in the 2023 FIA Formula 2 Championship.
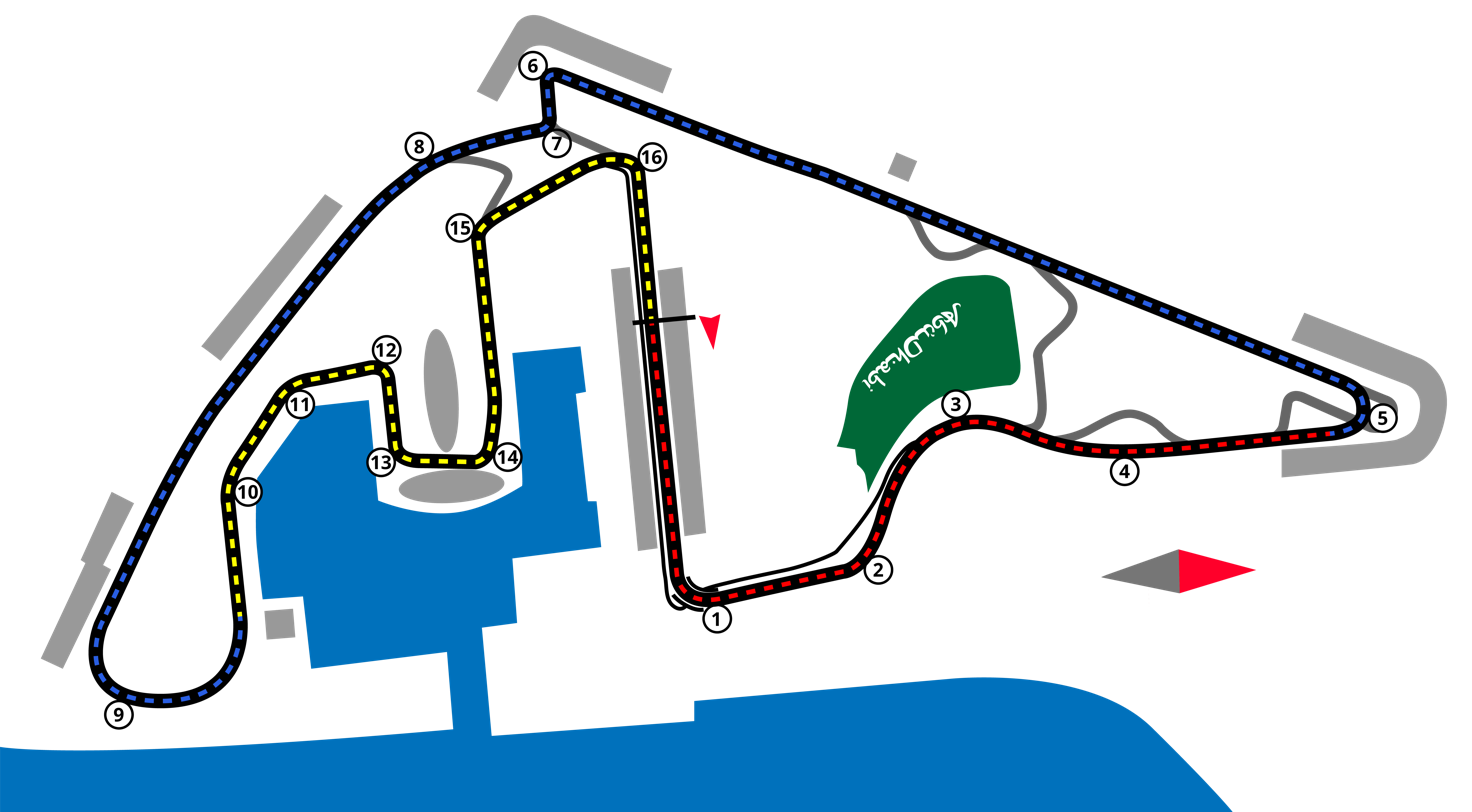
- Location: Yas Marina Circuit, Abu Dhabi, United Arab Emirates
- Course: Permanent Circuit; 5.281 km (3.281 mi)

Sprint race
- Date: 25 November 2023
- Laps: 23
Podium
First	(Denmark) Frederik Vesti	Prema Racing
Second	(Brazil) Enzo Fittipaldi	Rodin Carlin
Third	(Netherlands) Richard Verschoor	Van Amersfoort Racing
Fastest lap
Driver	(France) Victor Martins (Note: Victor Martins set the fastest lap, but did not finish in the top 10, so was ineligible to be the point-scorer for the fastest lap. Frederik Vesti was the point-scorer instead for setting the fastest lap of those finishing in the top 10.)	ART Grand Prix
- Time: 1:38.722 (on lap 14)

Feature race
- Date: 26 November 2023
- Laps: 33
Pole position
Driver	(Australia) Jack Doohan	Invicta Virtuosi Racing
Time	1:35.567	
Podium
First	(Australia) Jack Doohan	Invicta Virtuosi Racing
Second	(France) Victor Martins	ART Grand Prix
Third	(Denmark) Frederik Vesti	Prema Racing
Fastest lap
Driver	(France) Victor Martins	ART Grand Prix
- Time: 1:38.319 (on 33)

The 2023 Yas Island Formula 2 round was a motor racing event that was held between 25 and 26 November 2023 at the Yas Marina Circuit, Abu Dhabi, United Arab Emirates. It was the final race of the 2023 Formula 2 Championship and was held in support of the 2023 Abu Dhabi Grand Prix.

Théo Pourchaire became the 2023 Drivers' Champion after finishing seventh and fifth in both races, which was sufficient to win the championship by eleven points over his nearest rival Frederik Vesti, despite the fact that the Dane won the Sprint Race and finished third in the Feature Race. Pourchaire became the first Drivers' Champion for ART Grand Prix since Nyck de Vries in 2019, whilst the French outfit won the Teams' Championship for the first time.

Pourchaire also became the Formula 2 Drivers' Champion with the lowest number of wins scored in a single season, having only taken a solitary victory at the Feature Race of the season opener in Bahrain.

It was also the last event for the Dallara F2 2018 chassis which had been used since 2018, as it was replaced for 2024 by a new chassis.

== Classification ==
=== Qualifying ===
Pos.	No.	Driver	Entrant	Time	Gap	Grid SR	Grid FR
1	14	(Australia) Jack Doohan	Invicta Virtuosi Racing	1:35.567		10	1
2	6	(France) Victor Martins	ART Grand Prix	1:35.791	+0.224	9	2
3	24	(India) Kush Maini	Campos Racing	1:35.976	+0.409	8	3
4	3	(Barbados) Zane Maloney	Rodin Carlin	1:36.065	+0.498	7	4
5	11	(Japan) Ayumu Iwasa	DAMS	1:36.085	+0.518	6	5
6	1	(Norway) Dennis Hauger	MP Motorsport	1:36.168	+0.601	5	6
7	22	(Netherlands) Richard Verschoor	Van Amersfoort Racing	1:36.227	+0.660	4	7
8	10	(France) Isack Hadjar	Hitech Pulse-Eight	1:36.230	+0.663	3	8
9	7	(Denmark) Frederik Vesti	Prema Racing	1:36.274	+0.707	2	9
10	4	(Brazil) Enzo Fittipaldi	Rodin Carlin	1:36.282	+0.715	1	10
11	23	(United States) Juan Manuel Correa	Van Amersfoort Racing	1:36.324	+0.757	11	11
12	16	(Israel) Roy Nissany	PHM Racing by Charouz	1:36.373	+0.806	12	12
13	12	(Monaco) Arthur Leclerc	DAMS	1:36.377	+0.810	13	13
14	5	(France) Théo Pourchaire	ART Grand Prix	1:36.437	+0.870	14	14
15	20	(Czech Republic) Roman Staněk	Trident	1:36.449	+0.882	15	15
16	25	(Switzerland) Ralph Boschung	Campos Racing	1:36.503	+0.936	16	16
17	8	(United Kingdom) Oliver Bearman	Prema Racing	1:36.620	+1.053	17	17
18	15	(Belgium) Amaury Cordeel	Invicta Virtuosi Racing	1:36.648	+1.081	18	18
19	9	(United States) Jak Crawford	Hitech Pulse-Eight	1:36.718	+1.151	19	19
20	2	(Argentina) Franco Colapinto	MP Motorsport	1:37.231	+1.664	20	20
21	21	(Estonia) Paul Aron	Trident	1:37.391	+1.824	21	21
22	17	(United Kingdom) Joshua Mason	PHM Racing by Charouz	1:38.159	+2.592	22	22

=== Sprint race ===
Pos.	No.	Driver	Entrant	Laps	Time/Retired	Grid	Points
1	7	(Denmark) Frederik Vesti	Prema Racing	23	42:24.624	2	10 (1)
2	4	(Brazil) Enzo Fittipaldi	Rodin Carlin	23	+3.893	1	8
3	22	(Netherlands) Richard Verschoor	Van Amersfoort Racing	23	+6.310	4	6
4	1	(Norway) Dennis Hauger	MP Motorsport	23	+13.682	5	5
5	10	(France) Isack Hadjar	Hitech Pulse-Eight	23	+14.440	3	4
6	14	(Australia) Jack Doohan	Invicta Virtuosi Racing	23	+14.713	10	3
7	5	(France) Théo Pourchaire	ART Grand Prix	23	+15.228	14	2
8	11	(Japan) Ayumu Iwasa	DAMS	23	+16.508	6	1
9	3	(Barbados) Zane Maloney	Rodin Carlin	23	+17.573	7	
10	8	(United Kingdom) Oliver Bearman	Prema Racing	23	+19.810	17	
11	10	(Czech Republic) Roman Staněk	Trident	23	+22.690	15	
12	9	(United States) Jak Crawford	Hitech Pulse-Eight	23	+26.673	19	
13	24	(India) Kush Maini	Campos Racing	23	+26.720^{1}	8	
14	16	(Israel) Roy Nissany	PHM Racing by Charouz	23	+27.309	12	
15	17	(United Kingdom) Joshua Mason	PHM Racing by Charouz	23	+33.640	22	
16	21	(Estonia) Paul Aron	Trident	23	+37.040	21	
17	15	(Belgium) Amaury Cordeel	Invicta Virtuosi Racing	23	+37.842	18	
18	25	(Switzerland) Ralph Boschung	Campos Racing	23	+41.833	16	
19	2	(Argentina) Franco Colapinto	MP Motorsport	23	+43.806	20	
20	6	(France) Victor Martins	ART Grand Prix	23	+47.128	9	
21	12	(Monaco) Arthur Leclerc	DAMS	23	+48.688	13	
DNF	23	(United States) Juan Manuel Correa	Van Amersfoort Racing	0	Collision/Spun off	11	
Fastest lap set by (France) Victor Martins: 1:38.722 (lap 14)

Notes:

- ^1 – Kush Maini received a 5-second time penalty for causing a collision with Juan Manuel Correa, dropping him down from eleventh to thirteenth as a consequence.

=== Feature race ===
Pos.	No.	Driver	Entrant	Laps	Time/Retired	Grid	Points
1	14	(Australia) Jack Doohan	Invicta Virtuosi Racing	33	56:03.879	1	25 (2)
2	6	(France) Victor Martins	ART Grand Prix	33	+3.874	2	18 (1)
3	7	(Denmark) Frederik Vesti	Prema Racing	33	+22.485	9	15
4	11	(Japan) Ayumu Iwasa	DAMS	33	+26.283	5	12
5	5	(France) Théo Pourchaire	ART Grand Prix	33	+27.668	14	10
6	12	(Monaco) Arthur Leclerc	DAMS	33	+28.336	13	8
7	1	(Norway) Dennis Hauger	MP Motorsport	33	+29.079	6	6
8	10	(France) Isack Hadjar	Hitech Pulse-Eight	33	+30.090	8	4
9	24	(India) Kush Maini	Campos Racing	33	+33.113	3	2
10	9	(United States) Jak Crawford	Hitech Pulse-Eight	33	+36.223	19	1
11	16	(Israel) Roy Nissany	PHM Racing by Charouz	33	+38.996	12	
12	20	(Czech Republic) Roman Staněk	Trident	33	+43.688	15	
13	23	(United States) Juan Manuel Correa	Van Amersfoort Racing	33	+48.348	11	
14	4	(Brazil) Enzo Fittipaldi	Rodin Carlin	33	+49.678	10	
15	25	(Switzerland) Ralph Boschung	Campos Racing	33	+54.829	16	
16	15	(Belgium) Amaury Cordeel	Invicta Virtuosi Racing	33	+1:05.468	18	
17	3	(Barbados) Zane Maloney	Rodin Carlin	32	Spun off	4	
18	21	(Estonia) Paul Aron	Trident	32	+1 lap	21	
DNF	17	(United Kingdom) Joshua Mason	PHM Racing by Charouz	28	Electronics	9	
DNF	22	(Netherlands) Richard Verschoor	Van Amersfoort Racing	23	Fuel pressure	7	
DNF	8	(United Kingdom) Oliver Bearman	Prema Racing	16	Gearbox	17	
DNF	2	(Argentina) Franco Colapinto	MP Motorsport	15	Faulty sensor	20	
Fastest lap set by (France) Victor Martins: 1:38.319 (lap 33)

== Final championship standings ==
Drivers' Championship standings

	Pos.	Driver	Points
	1	(France) Théo Pourchaire	203
	2	(Denmark) Frederik Vesti	192
1	3	(Australia) Jack Doohan	168
1	4	(Japan) Ayumu Iwasa	165
	5	(France) Victor Martins	150

Teams' Championship standings

	Pos.	Team	Points
	1	(France) ART Grand Prix	353
	2	(Italy) Prema Racing	322
	3	(United Kingdom) Rodin Carlin	220
	4	(France) DAMS	214
1	5	(United Kingdom) Invicta Virtuosi Racing	176

- Note: Only the top five positions are included for both sets of standings.
- Note: Bold names include the 2023 Drivers' and Teams' Champion respectively.

== See also ==
- 2023 Abu Dhabi Grand Prix

== Notes ==
Previous round: 2023 Monza Formula 2 round	FIA Formula 2 Championship; 2023 season	Next round: 2024 Sakhir Formula 2 round
Previous round: 2022 Yas Island Formula 2 round	Yas Island Formula 2 round	Next round: 2024 Yas Island Formula 2 round
