= 2023 Monza Formula 2 round =

Motor racing event

(Italy) 2023 Monza Formula 2 round
Round details
- Round 12 of 13 in the 2023 FIA Formula 2 Championship.
- Location: Monza Circuit; Monza, Italy
- Course: Permanent racing facility 5.793 km (3.599 mi)

Sprint Race
- Date: 2 September 2023
- Laps: 21
Podium
First	(Denmark) Frederik Vesti	Prema Racing
Second	(France) Victor Martins	ART Grand Prix
Third	(Netherlands) Richard Verschoor	Van Amersfoort Racing
Fastest lap
Driver	(France) Victor Martins	ART Grand Prix
- Time: 1:34.308 (on lap 10)

Feature Race
- Date: 3 September 2023
- Laps: 30
Pole position
Driver	(France) Théo Pourchaire	ART Grand Prix
Time	1:32.328	
Podium
First	(United Kingdom) Oliver Bearman	Prema Racing
Second	(Japan) Ayumu Iwasa	DAMS
Third	(France) Théo Pourchaire	ART Grand Prix
Fastest lap
Driver	(France) Théo Pourchaire	ART Grand Prix
- Time: 1:34.678 (on lap 18)

The 2023 Monza Formula 2 round was a motor racing event held between 1 and 3 September 2023 at the Monza Circuit. It was the penultimate race of the 2023 Formula 2 Championship and was held in support of the 2023 Italian Grand Prix.

== Classification ==
=== Qualifying ===
Pos.	No.	Driver	Entrant	Time	Grid SR	Grid FR
1	5	(France) Théo Pourchaire	ART Grand Prix	1:32.328	10	1
2	8	(United Kingdom) Oliver Bearman	Prema Racing	+0.159	9	2
3	20	(Czech Republic) Roman Staněk	Trident	+0.206	8	3
4	10	(France) Isack Hadjar	Hitech Pulse-Eight	+0.207	7	4
5	6	(France) Victor Martins	ART Grand Prix	+0.210	6	5
6	24	(India) Kush Maini	Campos Racing	+0.214	5	6
7	9	(United States) Jak Crawford	Hitech Pulse-Eight	+0.229	4	7
8	7	(Denmark) Frederik Vesti	Prema Racing	+0.271	3	8
9	22	(Netherlands) Richard Verschoor	Van Amersfoort Racing	+0.312	2	9
10	25	(Switzerland) Ralph Boschung	Campos Racing	+0.327	1	10
11	1	(Norway) Dennis Hauger	MP Motorsport	+0.421	11	11
12	12	(Monaco) Arthur Leclerc	DAMS	+0.424	12	12
13	4	(Brazil) Enzo Fittipaldi	Rodin Carlin	+0.481	13	13
14	14	(Australia) Jack Doohan	Invicta Virtuosi Racing	+0.520	14	14
15	11	(Japan) Ayumu Iwasa	DAMS	+0.555	15	15
16	2	(India) Jehan Daruvala	MP Motorsport	+0.792	16	16
17	16	(Israel) Roy Nissany	PHM Racing by Charouz	+0.860	17	17
18	23	(United States) Juan Manuel Correa	Van Amersfoort Racing	+0.882	18	18
19	15	(Belgium) Amaury Cordeel	Invicta Virtuosi Racing	+0.941	19	19
20	3	(Barbados) Zane Maloney	Rodin Carlin	+1.073	20	20
21	21	(France) Clément Novalak	Trident	+1.146	21	21
22	17	(United Kingdom) Josh Mason	PHM Racing by Charouz	+2.057	22	22

=== Sprint race ===
Pos.	No.	Driver	Entrant	Laps	Time/Retired	Grid	Points
1	7	(Denmark) Frederik Vesti	Prema Racing	21	40:18.006	3	10
2	6	(France) Victor Martins	ART Grand Prix	21	+0.556	6	8 (1)
3	22	(Netherlands) Richard Verschoor	Van Amersfoort Racing	21	+0.996	2	6
4	5	(France) Théo Pourchaire	ART Grand Prix	21	+1.754	10	5
5	24	(India) Kush Maini	Campos Racing	21	+3.939	5	4
6	8	(United Kingdom) Oliver Bearman	Prema Racing	21	+6.372	9	3
7	12	(Monaco) Arthur Leclerc	DAMS	21	+7.202	12	2
8	20	(Czech Republic) Roman Staněk	Trident	21	+8.709	8	1
9	14	(Australia) Jack Doohan	Invicta Virtuosi Racing	21	+9.428	14	
10	21	(France) Clément Novalak	Trident	21	+10.155	21	
11	10	(France) Isack Hadjar	Hitech Pulse-Eight	21	+10.539^{1}	7	
12	1	(Norway) Dennis Hauger	MP Motorsport	21	+10.728	11	
13	9	(United States) Jak Crawford	Hitech Pulse-Eight	21	+11.181^{2}	4	
14	3	(Barbados) Zane Maloney	Rodin Carlin	21	+11.477	20	
15	4	(Brazil) Enzo Fittipaldi	Rodin Carlin	21	+13.819	13	
16	17	(United Kingdom) Josh Mason	PHM Racing by Charouz	21	+16.288	22	
17	2	(India) Jehan Daruvala	MP Motorsport	21	+18.903	16	
18	23	(United States) Juan Manuel Correa	Van Amersfoort Racing	21	+21.976^{3}	18	
19	25	(Switzerland) Ralph Boschung	Campos Racing	21	+24.194	1	
DNF	11	(Japan) Ayumu Iwasa	DAMS	12	Engine	15	
DNF	16	(Israel) Roy Nissany	PHM Racing by Charouz	11	Collision	17	
DNF	15	(Belgium) Amaury Cordeel	Invicta Virtuosi Racing	0	Collision	19	
Fastest lap set by (France) Victor Martins: 1:34.308 (lap 10)

Notes

- ^1 - Isack Hadjar received a 5-second time penalty for leaving the track and gaining an advantage.
- ^2 - Jak Crawford was handed a 5-second time penalty for exceeding track limits.
- ^3 - Juan Manuel Correa received a 10-second time penalty for causing a collision with Jehan Daruvala.

=== Feature race ===
Pos.	No.	Driver	Entrant	Laps	Time/Retired	Grid	Points
1	8	(United Kingdom) Oliver Bearman	Prema Racing	30	1:03:50.518	2	25
2	11	(Japan) Ayumu Iwasa	DAMS	30	+0.258	15	18
3	5	(France) Théo Pourchaire	ART Grand Prix	30	+0.462	1	15 (3)
4	4	(Brazil) Enzo Fittipaldi	Rodin Carlin	30	+0.906	13	12
5	1	(Norway) Dennis Hauger	MP Motorsport	30	+1.167	11	10
6	14	(Australia) Jack Doohan	Invicta Virtuosi Racing	30	+1.587	14	8
7	2	(India) Jehan Daruvala	MP Motorsport	30	+3.033	16	6
8	15	(Belgium) Amaury Cordeel	Invicta Virtuosi Racing	30	+3.361	19	4
9	25	(Switzerland) Ralph Boschung	Campos Racing	30	+3.532	10	2
10	20	(Czech Republic) Roman Staněk	Trident	30	+3.915	3	1
11	10	(France) Isack Hadjar	Hitech Pulse-Eight	30	+4.208	4	
12	17	(United Kingdom) Josh Mason	PHM Racing by Charouz	30	+4.391	22	
13	22	(Netherlands) Richard Verschoor	Van Amersfoort Racing	30	+5.538^{1}	9	
14	23	(United States) Juan Manuel Correa	Van Amersfoort Racing	30	+7.666^{2}	18	
15	16	(Israel) Roy Nissany	PHM Racing by Charouz	30	+10.025	17	
16^{3}	9	(United States) Jak Crawford	Hitech Pulse-Eight	27	Collision damage	7	
DNF	24	(India) Kush Maini	Campos Racing	22	Collision	6	
DNF	6	(France) Victor Martins	ART Grand Prix	20	Collision damage	5	
DNF	3	(Barbados) Zane Maloney	Rodin Carlin	11	Crash	20	
DNF	12	(Monaco) Arthur Leclerc	DAMS	6	Spun out	12	
DNF	7	(Denmark) Frederik Vesti	Prema Racing	0	Collision	8	
DNF	21	(France) Clément Novalak	Trident	0	Collision	21	
Fastest lap set by (France) Théo Pourchaire: 1:34.678 (lap 18)

Notes

- ^1 - Richard Verschoor received a 5-second time penalty for an unsafe release after a pit stop.
- ^2 - Juan Manuel Correa was handed a 5-second time penalty for speeding in the pit lane.
- ^3 - Despite not finishing, Jak Crawford was classified as he completed 90% of the race distance.

== Standings after the event ==
Drivers' Championship standings

Pos.	Driver	Points
1	(France) Théo Pourchaire	191
2	(Denmark) Frederik Vesti	166
3	(Japan) Ayumu Iwasa	152
4	(Australia) Jack Doohan	138
5	(France) Victor Martins	131

Teams' Championship standings

Pos.	Team	Points
1	(France) ART Grand Prix	322
2	(Italy) Prema Racing	296
3	(United Kingdom) Rodin Carlin	212
4	(France) DAMS	193
5	(Netherlands) MP Motorsport	161

- Note: Only the top five positions are included for both sets of standings.

== See also ==
- 2023 Italian Grand Prix
- 2023 Monza Formula 3 round

Previous round: 2023 Zandvoort Formula 2 round	FIA Formula 2 Championship; 2023 season	Next round: 2023 Yas Island Formula 2 round
Previous round: 2022 Monza Formula 2 round	Monza Formula 2 round	Next round: 2024 Monza Formula 2 round
