= Roman Staněk =

Czech racing driver (born 2004)

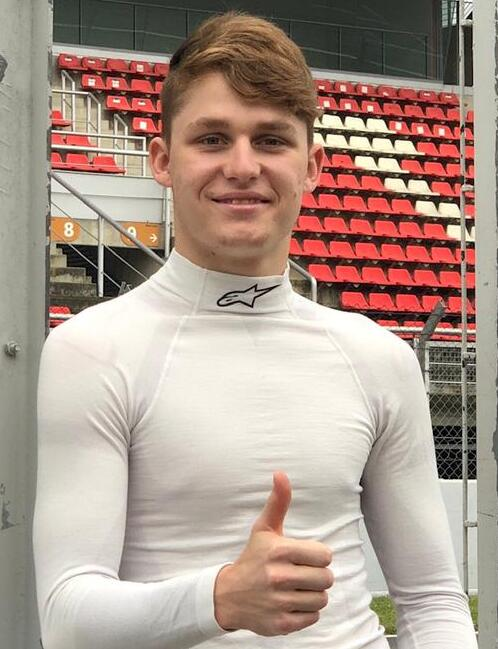
- Staněk in 2021
- Nationality: (Czech Republic) Czech
- Born: Roman Staněk Jr. 25 February 2004 (age 22) Valašské Meziříčí, Czech Republic

Super Formula Championship career
- Debut season: 2026
- Current team: Buzz MK Racing
- Car number: 97
- Starts: 10
- Wins: 0
- Podiums: 0
- Poles: 0
- Fastest laps: 0
- Best finish: TBD in 2026

Previous series
- 2023–2025; 2020–2022; 2021; 2021; 2019; 2019; 2019: FIA Formula 2; FIA Formula 3; Euroformula Open; F3 Asian; ADAC F4; Italian F4; F4 UAE

Championship titles
- 2019: ADAC Formula 4 Rookie Trophy

Awards
- 2023: Golden Steering Wheel

Roman Staněk Jr. (Czech pronunciation: [ˈroman ˈstaɲɛk]; born 25 February 2004) is a Czech racing driver who competes in the Super Formula Championship for Buzz MK Racing.

Staněk spent one season in ADAC Formula 4 and three in FIA Formula 3, where he placed fifth in 2022 for Trident. Staněk graduated to FIA Formula 2 and won at Melbourne in 2024 before leaving Trident mid-season. He switched to Invicta for 2025, and came tenth with two poles and a win at Spa. Staněk moved to the Japanese Super Formula in 2026.

== Junior racing career ==
=== Karting (2014–2018) ===
Staněk began karting internationally in 2014, competing in the 60 MINI category until 2016. The following year he moved up to OK Junior, and in 2018 he took part in the Karting World Championship in the OK category.

=== Formula 4 (2019) ===
Staněk made his single-seater debut in early 2019 at the last round of the Formula 4 UAE Championship, as a guest driver for Dragon Racing. He was named as a development driver for the Sauber Junior Team in 2019.

For the main season, Stanĕk combined the ADAC Formula 4 and Italian F4 championships, driving for the Sauber-backed US Racing-CHRS team in both. Eventually racking up three race wins and nine podiums across the two series, he was especially successful in the former, where he finished fourth in the standings and won the rookies' championship ahead of Mercedes junior Paul Aron. He starred at the opening round in Oschersleben, getting a second place and a commanding race 3 win which saw him take the lead of the championship. His other two victories of the season came in the ADAC F4 Nürburgring and Italian F4 Imola rounds.

=== FIA Formula 3 (2020–2022) ===
==== 2020 ====
Staněk was originally due to drive for the Prema Powerteam in the 2020 Formula Regional European Championship, but later during the COVID-19 lockdown, switched to Charouz Racing System for what he thought was a Formula 2 drive. He was instead placed in one of the team's FIA Formula 3 seats on the Thursday prior to the season opener, replacing the outgoing Niko Kari and becoming the youngest driver in the championship. With no previous testing, he struggled throughout the season, his sole points-scoring finish coming at the penultimate round in Monza. Staněk later described the move as "a mistake I really regret, because it could have ruined my career".

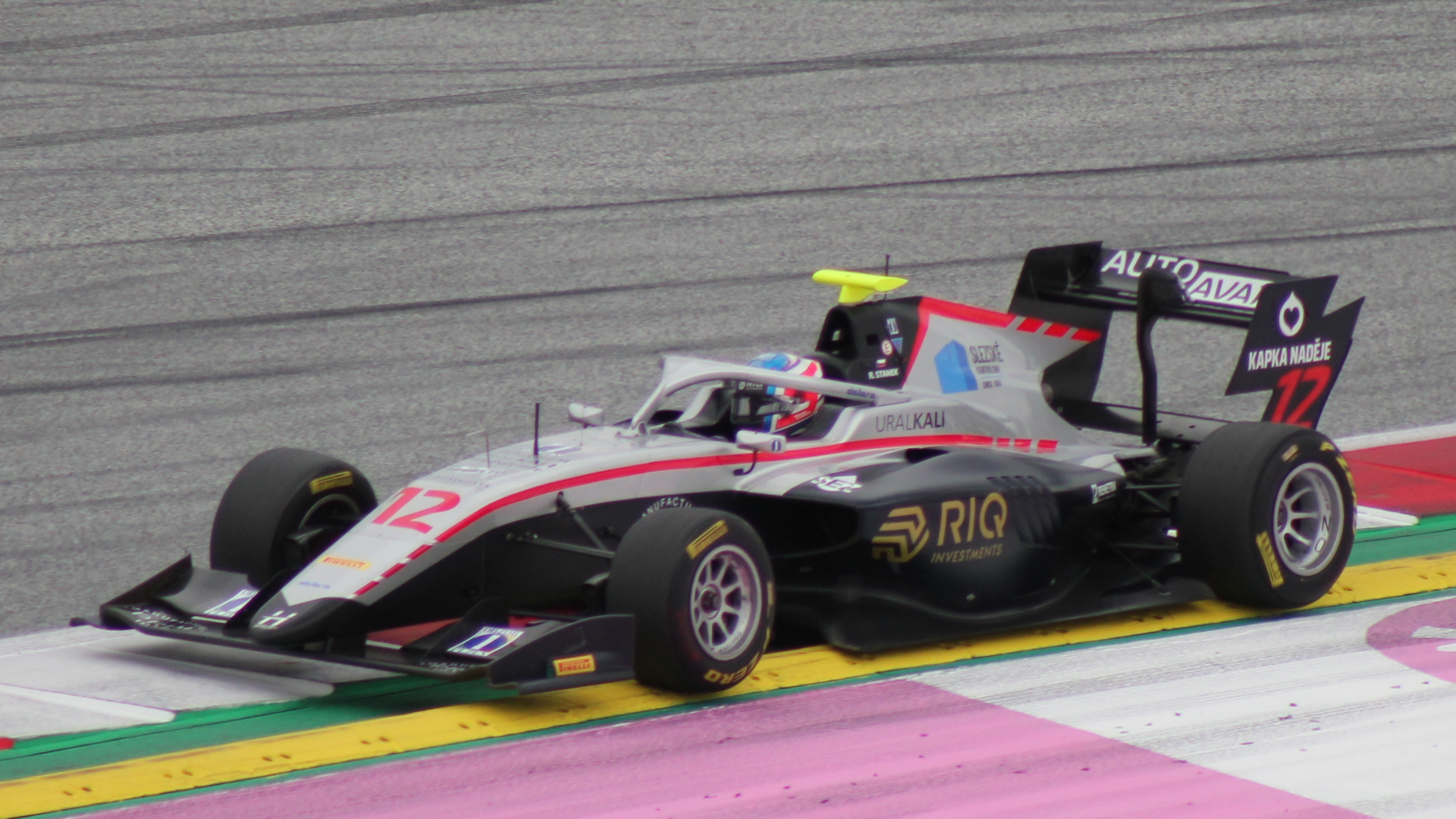
Staněk driving the Dallara F3 2019 during the 2021 Spielberg Formula 3 round

==== 2021 ====
For the 2021 season, Staněk joined Hitech Grand Prix to race in the F3 Asian Championship and FIA Formula 3. He finished tenth in the former and 16th in the latter, with two podium finishes. He also made a one-off appearance in the Euroformula Open for Team Motopark at Imola and managed to take a win and a second place.

==== 2022 ====
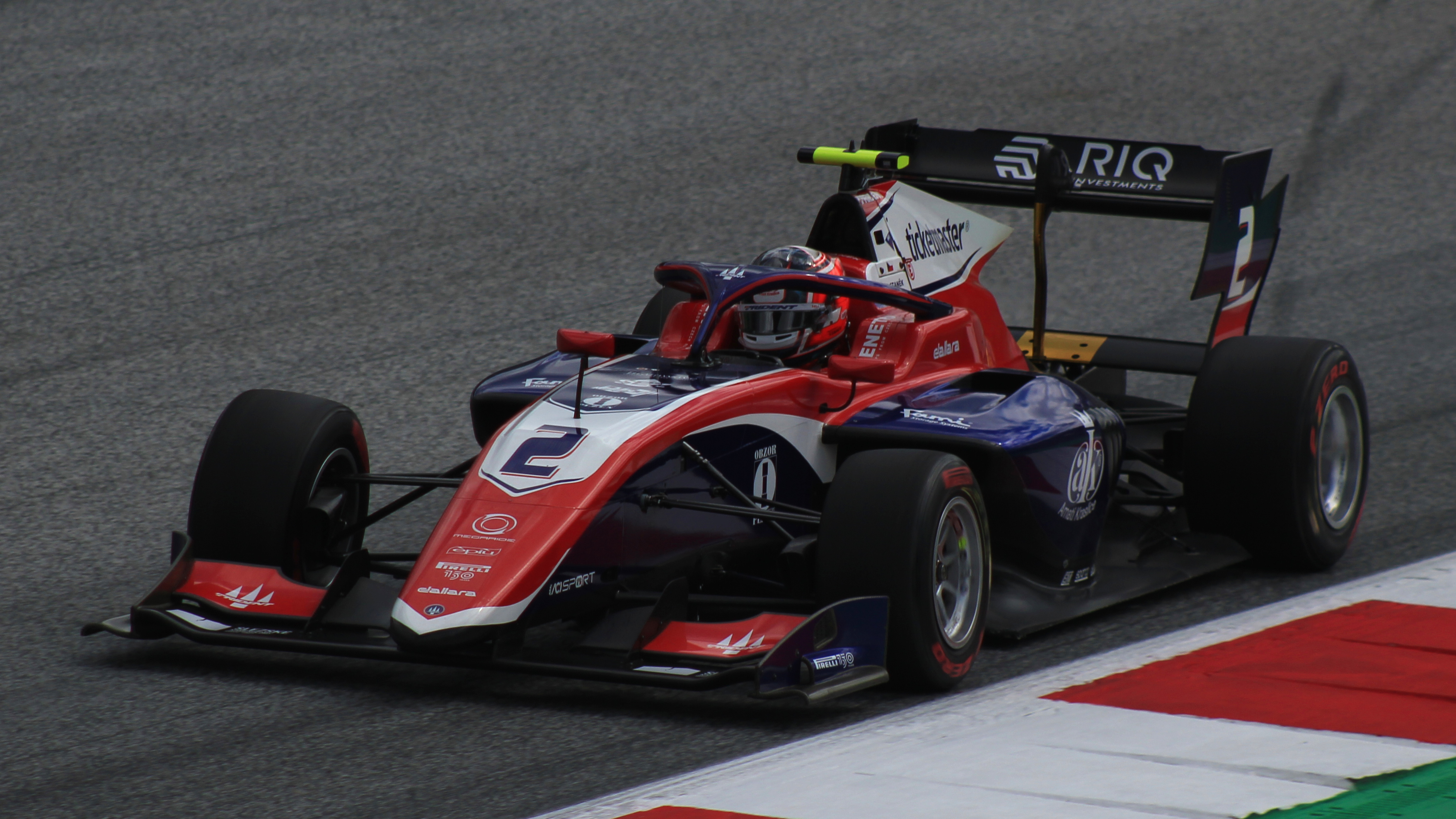
Staněk driving for Trident during the 2022 Spielberg Formula 3 round

In 2022, upon testing for them in post-season, Staněk moved to reigning teams' champions Trident for his third season in FIA Formula 3. Following a bad start to the season at Bahrain, where he suffered punctures in both races that sent him down the order, Staněk achieved his first-ever F3 victory in Imola, putting himself third in the championship after two rounds. Staněk would continue this form into the next weekend at Barcelona, where he took pole position. During the feature race, he lost the lead to Victor Martins, but still finished in second place. Misfortune caught Staněk in Silverstone, where a collision with Grégoire Saucy forced him out of the race. He wouldn't score a better finish than fifth in the following two rounds, before bouncing back into title contention with two second places at Spa-Francorchamps. Having scored more points at Zandvoort, Staněk arrived at the season finale in Monza sitting third in the drivers' standings. Despite a positive qualifying session, Staněk was unable to take advantage in the races, which meant that he finished fifth in the championship.

=== FIA Formula 2 (2023–2025) ===
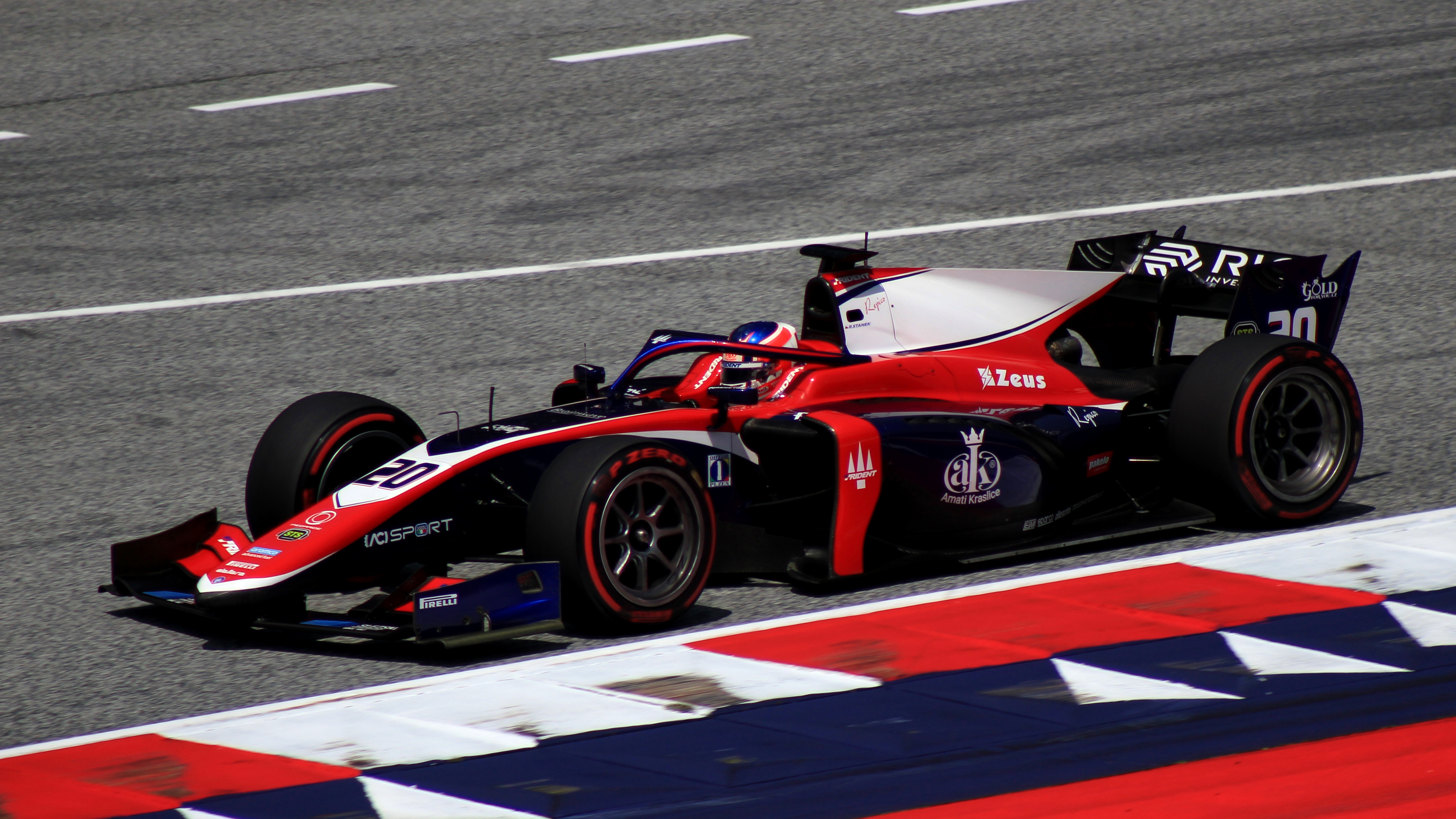
Staněk driving the Dallara F2 2018 during the 2023 Spielberg Formula 2 round

==== 2023 ====
Stanĕk partook in the 2022 F2 post-season test with Trident. On 11 January 2023, it was announced that he would be promoted to Formula 2 on a full-time basis with the Italian outfit, partnering Frenchman Clément Novalak. The season proved challenging, and despite flashes of speed that included a run from 22nd to seventh at Monaco and qualifying third at Monza, the Czech driver finished 18th in the standings.

Staněk took part in the 2023 Macau Grand Prix for Trident, a race where he finished 12th.

==== 2024 ====
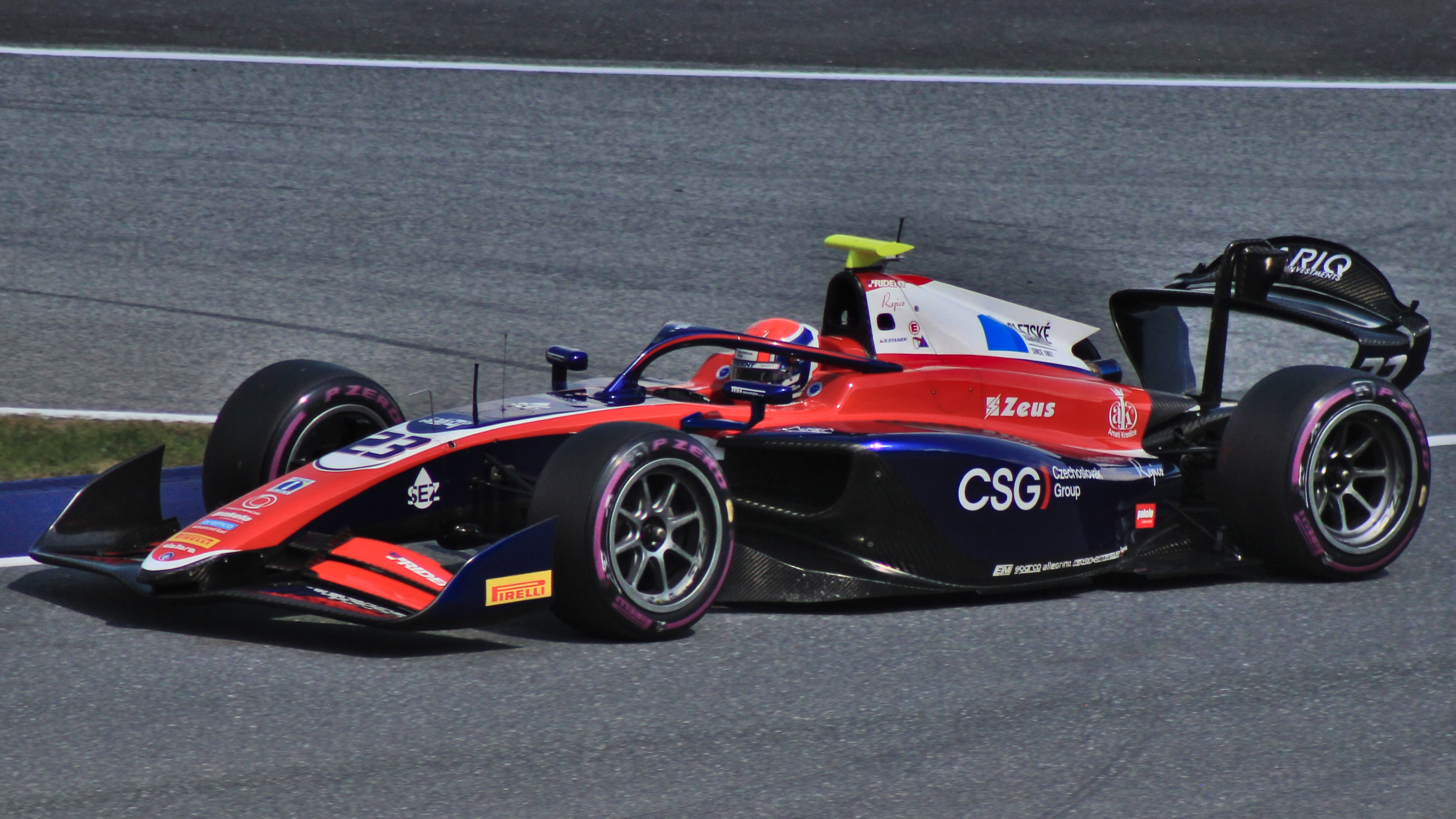
Staněk driving for Trident during the 2024 Spielberg Formula 2 round

After a period of financial uncertainty, Staněk eventually found new sponsorship from the Czechoslovak Group (CSG) and was retained by Trident to partner Richard Verschoor in 2024. He achieved his first Formula 2 win in the third round at Melbourne, after a fruitful defensive display and a penalty to on-track winner Isack Hadjar.

Following the Monza round, Staněk parted ways with Trident owing to unsatisfactory equipment and lack of budget, and was replaced by Formula 3 graduate Christian Mansell. He finished the season in 22nd overall with fourteen points.

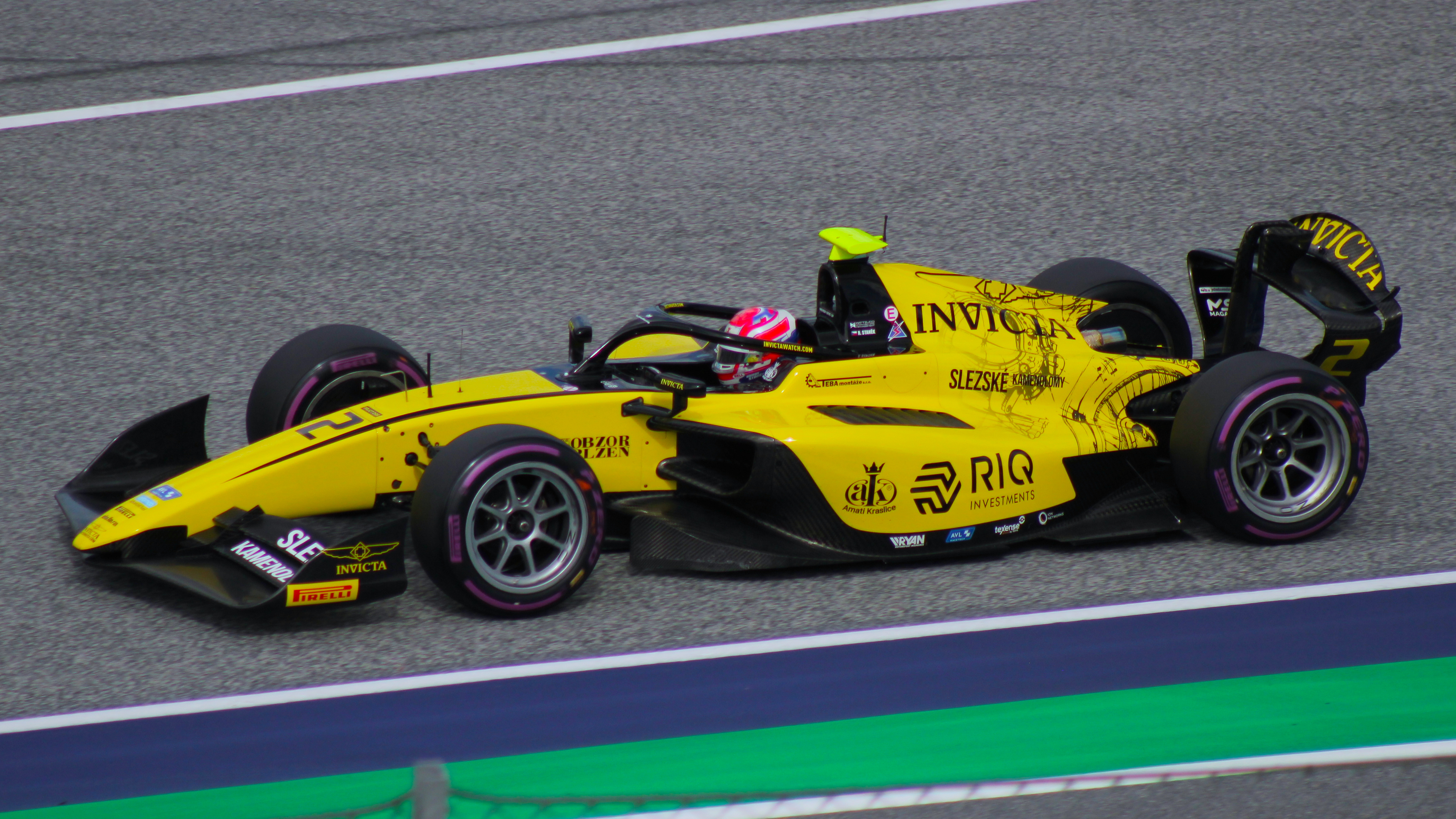
Staněk driving for Invicta Racing during the 2025 Spielberg Formula 2 round

==== 2025 ====
Despite missing the final three rounds in 2024, Staněk would continue in Formula 2 for 2025 with Invicta Racing, partnering 2024 FIA Formula 3 champion Leonardo Fornaroli. He took his first Formula 2 Feature Race win at Spa-Francorchamps.

== Single-seater career ==
=== Super Formula (2026) ===
After three years of racing in Formula 2, Staněk moved to Super Formula in 2026, driving for Kondo's Buzz MK Racing outfit. In April 2026, he began receiving support from Czech company Fintokei, which has operated in Japan since 2023, with the company's logo subsequently appearing on his car.

== Karting record ==
=== Karting career summary ===
Season	Series	Team	Position
2015	WSK Champions Cup — 60 Mini	STANEK ROMAN	24th
2015	WSK Gold Cup — 60 Mini	STANEK ROMAN	27th
2015	WSK Super Master Series — 60 Mini	STANEK ROMAN	36th
2015	WSK Night Edition — 60 Mini	STANEK ROMAN	15th
2016	South Garda Winter Cup — Mini ROK		**3rd**
2016	Andrea Margutti Trophy — 60 Mini		23rd
2016	WSK Super Master Series — 60 Mini	Giugliano Kart	6th
2016	WSK Final Cup — 60 Mini	HKC-1	22nd
2017	WSK Champions Cup — OKJ	Kosmic Racing Departement	NC
2017	South Garda Winter Cup — OKJ		10th
2017	SKUSA SuperNationals — X30 Junior	Rolison Performance Group	46th
2017	German Karting Championship — Junior		15th
2017	WSK Super Master Series — OKJ	Kosmic Racing Departement	36th
2017	CIK-FIA European Championship — OKJ	Kosmic Racing Departement	17th
2017	CIK-FIA World Championship — OKJ	Kosmic Racing Departement	44th
2017	WSK Final Cup — OKJ	Kosmic Racing Departement	**1st**
2018	WSK Champions Cup — OK	Kosmic Racing Departement	10th
2018	South Garda Winter Cup — OK	Kosmic Racing Departement	18th
2018	WSK Super Master Series — OK	Kosmic Racing Departement	10th
2018	WSK Open Cup — OK	Kosmic Racing Departement	9th
2018	CIK-FIA European Championship — OK	Kosmic Racing Departement	7th
2018	CIK-FIA World Championship — OK	Kosmic Racing Departement	26th
2018	WSK Final Cup — OK	Kosmic Racing Departement	8th

=== Complete CIK-FIA Karting European Championship results ===
(key) (Races in bold indicate pole position) (Races in italics indicate fastest lap)

Year	Team	Class	1	2	3	4	5	6	7	8	9	10	DC	Points
2017	Kosmic Racing Department	OKJ	SAR; QH; 17	SAR; R 12	CAY; QH; 14	CAY; R 26	LEM; QH; 15	LEM; R 6	ALA; QH; 17	ALA; R 30	KRI; QH; 14	KRI; R 6	17th	31
2018	Kosmic Racing Department	OK	SAR; QH; 1	**SAR**; **R** 1	PFI; QH; 15	PFI; R 18	AMP; QH; 7	AMP; R 11	ALB; QH; 23	ALB; R DNS			7th	44

== Racing record ==
=== Racing career summary ===
Season	Series	Team	Races	Wins	Poles	F/Laps	Podiums	Points	Position
2019	Formula 4 UAE Championship	Dragon Racing	4	0	0	0	0	0	NC†
2019	ADAC Formula 4 Championship	US Racing-CHRS	20	2	0	2	5	165	4th
2019	Italian F4 Championship	US Racing-CHRS	18	1	6	1	4	144	5th
2020	FIA Formula 3 Championship	Charouz Racing System	18	0	0	0	0	3	21st
2020	Formula Renault Eurocup	MP Motorsport	2	0	0	0	0	2	18th
2021	FIA Formula 3 Championship	Hitech Grand Prix	20	0	0	0	2	29	16th
2021	F3 Asian Championship	Hitech Grand Prix	15	0	0	0	0	60	10th
2021	Euroformula Open Championship	Team Motopark	3	1	0	0	2	55	12th
2022	FIA Formula 3 Championship	Trident	18	1	1	2	4	117	5th
2023	FIA Formula 2 Championship	Trident	26	0	0	0	0	15	18th
2023	Macau Grand Prix	Trident	1	0	0	0	0	N/A	12th
2024	FIA Formula 2 Championship	Trident	22	1	0	0	1	14	22nd
2025	FIA Formula 2 Championship	Invicta Racing	27	1	2	0	5	105	10th
2026	Super Formula	Navikuru Buzz MK Racing	10	0	0	0	0	4.5	21st*

* Season still in progress.
^{†} As Staněk was a guest driver, he was ineligible to score points.

=== Complete Formula 4 UAE Championship results ===
(key) (Races in bold indicate pole position; races in italics indicate fastest lap)

Year	Team	1	2	3	4	5	6	7	8	9	10	11	12	13	14	15	16	17	18	19	20	DC	Points
2019	Dragon Racing	DUB1; 1	DUB1; 2	DUB1; 3	DUB1; 4	YMC1; 1	YMC1; 2	YMC1; 3	YMC1; 4	DUB2; 1	DUB2; 2	DUB2; 3	DUB2; 4	YMC2; 1	YMC2; 2	YMC2; 3	YMC2; 4	DUB3; 1; 6	DUB3; 2; 6	DUB3; 3 Ret	DUB3; 4; 6	NC†	0

^{†} As Staněk was a guest driver, he was ineligible to score points.

=== Complete Italian F4 Championship results ===
(key) (Races in bold indicate pole position) (Races in italics indicate fastest lap)

Year	Team	1	2	3	4	5	6	7	8	9	10	11	12	13	14	15	16	17	18	19	20	21	22	Pos	Points
2019	US Racing-CHRS	VLL; 1; 4	**VLL**; **2**; 4	VLL; 3; 6	MIS; 1	MIS; 2	MIS; 3	HUN; 1; 19	HUN; 2; 7	HUN; 3 Ret	**RBR**; **1** Ret	RBR; 2; 12	**RBR**; **3**; 5	**IMO**; **1**; 25	**IMO**; **2**; 1	**IMO**; **3**; 3	IMO; 4 DNS	MUG; 1; 7	MUG; 2; 2	MUG; 3; 7	MNZ; 1; 26	MNZ; 2; 6	MNZ; 3; 2	5th	144

=== Complete ADAC Formula 4 Championship results ===
(key) (Races in bold indicate pole position) (Races in italics indicate fastest lap)

Year	Team	1	2	3	4	5	6	7	8	9	10	11	12	13	14	15	16	17	18	19	20	Pos	Points
2019	US Racing-CHRS	OSC; 1; 2	OSC; 2; 8	OSC; 3; 1	RBR; 1; 7	RBR; 2; 21	RBR; 3; 7	HOC; 1; 13	HOC; 2; 5	ZAN; 1; 4	ZAN; 2; 14	ZAN; 3; 11	NÜR; 1; 2	NÜR; 2; 8	NÜR; 3; 1	HOC; 1; 8	HOC; 2; 10	HOC; 3; 2	SAC; 1; 10	SAC; 2; 8	SAC; 3; 6	4th	165

=== Complete Formula Renault Eurocup results ===
(key) (Races in bold indicate pole position) (Races in italics indicate fastest lap)

Year	Team	1	2	3	4	5	6	7	8	9	10	11	12	13	14	15	16	17	18	19	20	Pos	Points
2020	MP Motorsport	MNZ; 1	MNZ; 2	IMO; 1	IMO; 2	NÜR; 1	NÜR; 2	MAG; 1	MAG; 2	ZAN; 1; 14	ZAN; 2; 9	CAT; 1	CAT; 2	SPA; 1	SPA; 2	IMO; 1	IMO; 2	HOC; 1	HOC; 2	LEC; 1	LEC; 2	18th	2

=== Complete FIA Formula 3 Championship results ===
(key) (Races in bold indicate pole position; races in italics indicate points for the fastest lap of top ten finishers)

Year	Entrant	1	2	3	4	5	6	7	8	9	10	11	12	13	14	15	16	17	18	19	20	21	DC	Points
2020	Charouz Racing System	RBR; FEA; 17	RBR; SPR; 23	RBR; FEA; 17	RBR; SPR; 24	HUN; FEA; 23	HUN; SPR; 20	SIL; FEA; 17	SIL; SPR; 18	SIL; FEA; 22	SIL; SPR; 15	CAT; FEA; 22	CAT; SPR; 19	SPA; FEA; 24	SPA; SPR; 18	MNZ; FEA; 11	MNZ; SPR; 8	MUG; FEA; 26†	MUG; SPR; 18				21st	3
2021	Hitech Grand Prix	CAT; 1; 16	CAT; 2; 12	CAT; 3; 10	LEC; 1; 26	LEC; 2; 19	LEC; 3; 15	RBR; 1; 11	RBR; 2; 4	RBR; 3; 12	HUN; 1; 11	HUN; 2; 3	HUN; 3; 23	SPA; 1; 3	SPA; 2; 13	SPA; 3; 15	ZAN; 1; 27	ZAN; 2; 15	ZAN; 3; 13	SOC; 1; 13	SOC; 2 C	SOC; 3; 26	16th	29
2022	Trident	BHR; SPR; 24	BHR; FEA; 22	IMO; SPR; 4	IMO; FEA; 1	CAT; SPR; 8	**CAT**; **FEA**; 2	SIL; SPR; 6	SIL; FEA; Ret	RBR; SPR; 5	RBR; FEA; 11	HUN; SPR; 9	HUN; FEA; 12	SPA; SPR; 2	SPA; FEA; 2	ZAN; SPR; 10	ZAN; FEA; 4	MNZ; SPR; 12	MNZ; FEA; 6				5th	117

^{†} Driver did not finish the race, but was classified as they completed more than 90% of the race distance.

=== Complete F3 Asian Championship results ===
(key) (Races in bold indicate pole position) (Races in italics indicate the fastest lap of top ten finishers)

Year	Entrant	1	2	3	4	5	6	7	8	9	10	11	12	13	14	15	DC	Points
2021	Hitech Grand Prix	DUB; 1; 12	DUB; 2; 12	DUB; 3 Ret	ABU; 1; 6	ABU; 2; 9	ABU; 3; 8	ABU; 1; 9	ABU; 2; 8	ABU; 3; 6	DUB; 1; 6	DUB; 2; 4	DUB; 3; 11	ABU; 1; 18†	ABU; 2 Ret	ABU; 3; 4	10th	60

=== Complete Euroformula Open Championship results ===
(key) (Races in bold indicate pole position; races in italics indicate points for the fastest lap of top ten finishers)

Year	Entrant	1	2	3	4	5	6	7	8	9	10	11	12	13	14	15	16	17	18	19	20	21	22	23	24	DC	Points
2021	Team Motopark	POR; 1	POR; 2	POR; 3	LEC; 1	LEC; 2	LEC; 3	SPA; 1	SPA; 2	SPA; 3	HUN; 1	HUN; 2	HUN; 3	IMO; 1; 4	IMO; 2; 1	IMO; 3; 2	RBR; 1	RBR; 2	RBR; 3	MNZ; 1	MNZ; 2	MNZ; 3	CAT; 1	CAT; 2	CAT; 3	12th	55

=== Complete Macau Grand Prix results ===
Year	Team	Car	Qualifying	Quali Race	Main race
2023	(Italy) Trident Motorsport	Dallara F3 2019	20th	19th	12th

=== Complete FIA Formula 2 Championship results ===
(key) (Races in bold indicate pole position) (Races in italics indicate points for the fastest lap of top ten finishers)

Year	Entrant	1	2	3	4	5	6	7	8	9	10	11	12	13	14	15	16	17	18	19	20	21	22	23	24	25	26	27	28	DC	Points
2023	Trident	BHR; SPR; 13	BHR; FEA; Ret	JED; SPR; 17	JED; FEA; 14	MEL; SPR; 16	MEL; FEA; 14	BAK; SPR; 8	BAK; FEA; 17	MCO; SPR; 12	MCO; FEA; 7	CAT; SPR; 13	CAT; FEA; 12	RBR; SPR; 5	RBR; FEA; Ret	SIL; SPR; 15	SIL; FEA; Ret	HUN; SPR; 16	HUN; FEA; 14	SPA; SPR; 15	SPA; FEA; 9	ZAN; SPR; 14	ZAN; FEA; 11	MNZ; SPR; 8	MNZ; FEA; 10	YMC; SPR; 11	YMC; FEA; 12			18th	15
2024	Trident	BHR; SPR; Ret	BHR; FEA; 13	JED; SPR; DSQ	JED; FEA; Ret	MEL; SPR; 1	MEL; FEA; 15	IMO; SPR; Ret	IMO; FEA; 18	MON; SPR; 6	MON; FEA; 16	CAT; SPR; 22	CAT; FEA; 17	RBR; SPR; 21	RBR; FEA; 18	SIL; SPR; 8	SIL; FEA; 18	HUN; SPR; 15	HUN; FEA; 11	SPA; SPR; 20	SPA; FEA; 14	MNZ; SPR; 15	MNZ; FEA; 17	BAK; SPR	BAK; FEA	LSL; SPR	LSL; FEA	YMC; SPR	YMC; FEA	22nd	14
2025	Invicta Racing	MEL; SPR; 5	MEL; FEA; C	BHR; SPR; 15	BHR; FEA; 17	JED; SPR; 5	JED; FEA; 12	IMO; SPR; 8	IMO; FEA; 17	MON; SPR; 11	MON; FEA; 7	CAT; SPR; 17	CAT; FEA; 11	RBR; SPR; 3	RBR; FEA; 8	SIL; SPR; 3	SIL; FEA; Ret	SPA; SPR; 6	SPA; FEA; 1	HUN; SPR; 13	**HUN**; **FEA**; 2	MNZ; SPR; 5	MNZ; FEA; Ret	BAK; SPR; 11	BAK; FEA; 13	LSL; SPR; 13	LSL; FEA; 8	YMC; SPR; 10	**YMC**; **FEA**; 2	10th	105

=== Complete Super Formula results ===
Year	Team	Engine	1	2	3	4	5	6	7	8	9	10	11	12	DC	Points
2026	Navikuru Buzz MK Racing	Toyota	MOT; 10‡	MOT; 17	SUZ; 8	SUZ; 15	FUJ; 16	FUJ; 21	FUJ; 19	SUG; Ret	FUJ; 17	FUJ; 10	SUZ	SUZ	21st*	4.5*

^{‡} Half points awarded as less than 75% of race distance was completed. ^{*} Season still in progress.
