= 2022 Silverstone Formula 2 round =

(United Kingdom) 2022 Silverstone Formula 2 round
Round details
- Round 7 of 14 in the 2022 FIA Formula 2 Championship.
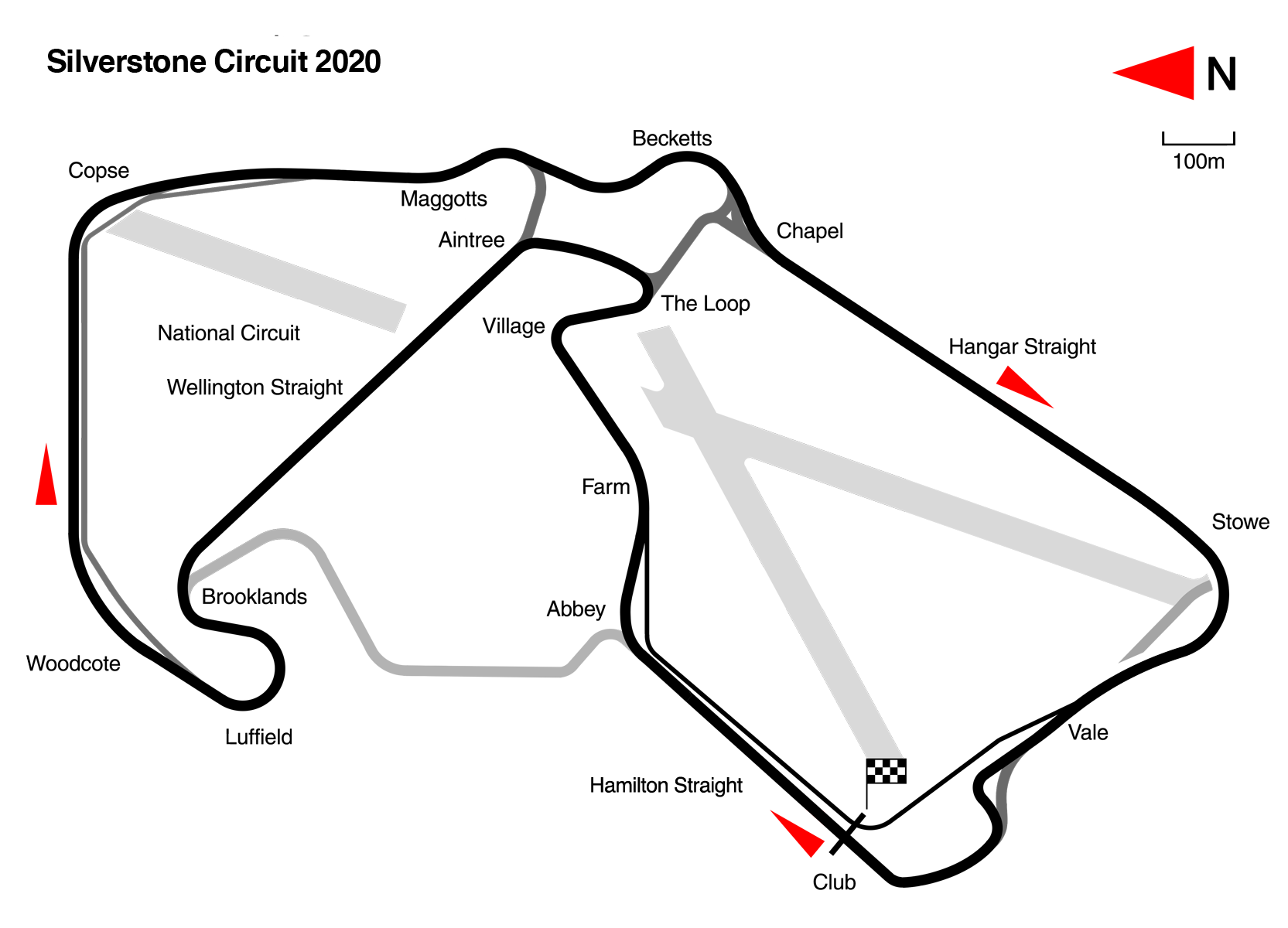
- Location: Silverstone Circuit, Silverstone, United Kingdom
- Course: Permanent Circuit; 5.891 km (3.661 mi)

Sprint Race
- Date: 2 July 2022
- Laps: 21
Podium
First	(Australia) Jack Doohan	Virtuosi Racing
Second	(Japan) Ayumu Iwasa	DAMS
Third	(Brazil) Enzo Fittipaldi	Charouz Racing System
Fastest lap
Driver	(Japan) Ayumu Iwasa	DAMS
- Time: 1:58.954 (on lap 20)

Feature Race
- Date: 3 July 2022
- Laps: 29
Pole position
Driver	(United States) Logan Sargeant	Carlin
Time	1:38.432	
Podium
First	(United States) Logan Sargeant	Carlin
Second	(France) Théo Pourchaire	ART Grand Prix
Third	(New Zealand) Liam Lawson	Carlin
Fastest lap
Driver	(Germany) David Beckmann	Van Amersfoort Racing
- Time: 1:40.842 (on 27)

The 2022 Silverstone FIA Formula 2 round was a motor racing event held between 1 and 3 July 2022 at Silverstone Circuit, Silverstone, United Kingdom. It was the seventh round of the 2022 FIA Formula 2 Championship and was held in support of the 2022 British Grand Prix.

== Driver changes ==
After collecting a total of 12 penalty points, Amaury Cordeel was suspended for the Silverstone round and was replaced by David Beckmann. It was the first time in Formula 2 since 2019 that a driver was suspended for an entire weekend, following Mahaveer Raghunathan's ban in the 2019 Spielberg Formula 2 round due to repeatedly erratic driving.

== Classification ==
=== Qualifying ===
Logan Sargeant took his maiden Formula 2 pole position, which was the first for Carlin since Yuki Tsunoda's pole at the 2020 Sakhir Grand Prix. Sargeant qualified ahead of Frederik Vesti and championship leader Felipe Drugovich, who set the same time as championship rival Théo Pourchaire. Drugovich was given precedence, as he set the lap time first.

Pos.	No.	Driver	Entrant	Time	Grid SR	Grid FR
1	6	(United States) Logan Sargeant	Carlin	1:38.432	10	1
2	9	(Denmark) Frederik Vesti	ART Grand Prix	+0.107	9	2
3	11	(Brazil) Felipe Drugovich	MP Motorsport	+0.121	8	3
4	10	(France) Théo Pourchaire	ART Grand Prix	+0.121	7	4
5	5	(New Zealand) Liam Lawson	Carlin	+0.193	6	5
6	17	(Japan) Ayumu Iwasa	DAMS	+0.302	5	6
7	3	(Australia) Jack Doohan	Virtuosi Racing	+0.469	4	7
8	8	(Estonia) Jüri Vips	Hitech Grand Prix	+0.581	3	8
9	22	(Brazil) Enzo Fittipaldi	Charouz Racing System	+0.645	2	9
10	2	(India) Jehan Daruvala	Prema Racing	+0.683	1	10
11	16	(Israel) Roy Nissany	DAMS	+0.790	11	11
12	7	(New Zealand) Marcus Armstrong	Hitech Grand Prix	+0.834	12	12
13	1	(Norway) Dennis Hauger	Prema Racing	+0.997	13	13
14	24	(United Kingdom) Jake Hughes	Van Amersfoort Racing	+1.016	14	14
15	20	(Netherlands) Richard Verschoor	Trident	+1.060	15	15
16	14	(United Kingdom) Olli Caldwell	Campos Racing	+1.148	16	16
17	15	(Switzerland) Ralph Boschung	Campos Racing	+1.165	— ^{1}	— ^{1}
18	12	(France) Clément Novalak	MP Motorsport	+1.228	17	17
19	4	(Japan) Marino Sato	Virtuosi Racing	+1.245	18	18
20	23	(Turkey) Cem Bölükbaşı	Charouz Racing System	+1.259	19	19
21	21	(Australia) Calan Williams	Trident	+1.480	20	20
22	25	(Germany) David Beckmann	Van Amersfoort Racing	+1.859	21	21

Notes:

- ^1 – Despite qualifying in seventeenth place, Ralph Boschung later withdrew from the remainder of the weekend due to the effects of a neck injury sustained at the third round in Imola. All remaining drivers behind Boschung were promoted each one place at the starting grid.

=== Sprint race ===
Pos.	No.	Driver	Entrant	Laps	Time/Retired	Grid	Points
1	3	(Australia) Jack Doohan	Virtuosi Racing	20	40:42.488	4	10
2	17	(Japan) Ayumu Iwasa	DAMS	20	+0.932	5	8 (1)
3	22	(Brazil) Enzo Fittipaldi	Charouz Racing System	20	+16.722	2	6
4	10	(France) Théo Pourchaire	ART Grand Prix	20	+17.888	7	5
5	11	(Brazil) Felipe Drugovich	MP Motorsport	20	+21.717	8	4
6	9	(Denmark) Frederik Vesti	ART Grand Prix	20	+26.830	9	3
7	6	(United States) Logan Sargeant	Carlin	20	+28.284	10	2
8	2	(India) Jehan Daruvala	Prema Racing	20	+36.291	1	1
9	7	(New Zealand) Marcus Armstrong	Hitech Grand Prix	20	+38.699	11	
10	20	(Netherlands) Richard Verschoor	Trident	20	+43.770	15	
11	24	(United Kingdom) Jake Hughes	Van Amersfoort Racing	20	+44.611	13	
12	8	(Estonia) Jüri Vips	Hitech Grand Prix	20	+48.113	3	
13	12	(France) Clément Novalak	MP Motorsport	20	+49.448	17	
14	16	(Israel) Roy Nissany	DAMS	20	+54.509	14^{1}	
15	1	(Norway) Dennis Hauger	Prema Racing	20	+55.235	12	
16	25	(Germany) David Beckmann	Van Amersfoort Racing	20	+58.703	21	
17	21	(Australia) Calan Williams	Trident	20	+1:06.077	20	
18	14	(United Kingdom) Olli Caldwell	Campos Racing	20	+1:06.411	16	
19	23	(Turkey) Cem Bölükbaşı	Charouz Racing System	20	+1:21.711	19	
20	5	(New Zealand) Liam Lawson	Carlin	20	+1:35.025	6	
DNF	4	(Japan) Marino Sato	Virtuosi Racing	11	Driveshaft	18	
WD	15	(Switzerland) Ralph Boschung	Campos Racing	—	Withdrew	—	
Fastest lap set by (Japan) Ayumu Iwasa: 1:58.954 (lap 20)

Notes:

- ^1 – Roy Nissany has been handed a three-place grid penalty for causing a collision with Cem Bölükbaşı at the previous round in Baku.

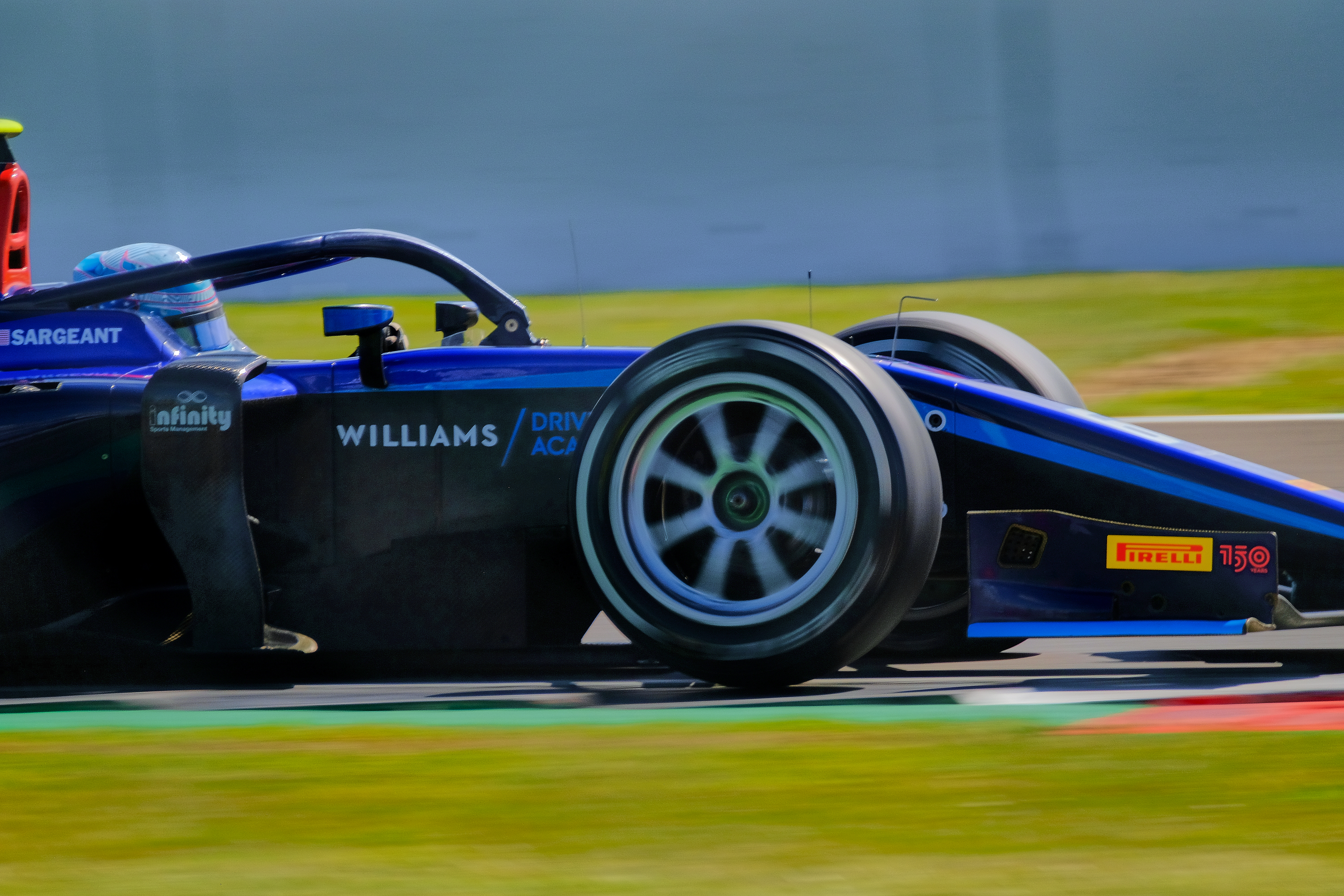
Logan Sargeant won his first F2 feature race

=== Feature race ===
Pos.	No.	Driver	Entrant	Laps	Time/Retired	Grid	Points
1	6	(United States) Logan Sargeant	Carlin	29	53:50.586	1	25 (2)
2	10	(France) Théo Pourchaire	ART Grand Prix	29	+1.681	4	18
3	5	(New Zealand) Liam Lawson	Carlin	29	+8.994	5	15
4	11	(Brazil) Felipe Drugovich	MP Motorsport	29	+11.312	3	12
5	9	(Denmark) Frederik Vesti	ART Grand Prix	29	+11.961	2	10
6	8	(Estonia) Jüri Vips	Hitech Grand Prix	29	+12.276	8	8
7	2	(India) Jehan Daruvala	Prema Racing	29	+13.899	10	6
8	7	(New Zealand) Marcus Armstrong	Hitech Grand Prix	29	+17.320	12	4
9	3	(Australia) Jack Doohan	Virtuosi Racing	29	+21.033	7	2
10	24	(United Kingdom) Jake Hughes	Van Amersfoort Racing	29	+28.297	14	1
11	22	(Brazil) Enzo Fittipaldi	Charouz Racing System	29	+29.117	9	
12	17	(Japan) Ayumu Iwasa	DAMS	29	+30.586	6	
13	12	(France) Clément Novalak	MP Motorsport	29	+34.161	17	
14	20	(Netherlands) Richard Verschoor	Trident	29	+35.004	15	
15	4	(Japan) Marino Sato	Virtuosi Racing	29	+35.426	18	
16	21	(Australia) Calan Williams	Trident	29	+36.391	20	
17	14	(United Kingdom) Olli Caldwell	Campos Racing	29	+51.166	16	
18	23	(Turkey) Cem Bölükbaşı	Charouz Racing System	29	+1:01.078	19	
19	25	(Germany) David Beckmann	Van Amersfoort Racing	29	+1:03.207	21	
DNF	16	(Israel) Roy Nissany	DAMS	0	Collision	11	
DNF	1	(Norway) Dennis Hauger	Prema Racing	0	Collision	13	
WD	15	(Switzerland) Ralph Boschung	Campos Racing	—	Withdrew	—	
Fastest lap set by (Germany) David Beckmann: 1:40.842 (lap 27)

== Standings after the event ==
Drivers' Championship standings

	Pos.	Driver	Points
	1	(Brazil) Felipe Drugovich	148
	2	(France) Théo Pourchaire	106
1	3	(United States) Logan Sargeant	88
1	4	(India) Jehan Daruvala	80
5	5	(New Zealand) Liam Lawson	59

Teams' Championship standings

	Pos.	Team	Points
	1	(Netherlands) MP Motorsport	170
1	2	(France) ART Grand Prix	160
2	3	(United Kingdom) Carlin	147
2	4	(Italy) Prema Racing	135
1	5	(United Kingdom) Hitech Grand Prix	118

- Note: Only the top five positions are included for both sets of standings.

== See also ==
- 2022 British Grand Prix
- 2022 Silverstone Formula 3 round

Previous round: 2022 Baku Formula 2 round	FIA Formula 2 Championship; 2022 season	Next round: 2022 Spielberg Formula 2 round
Previous round: 2021 Silverstone Formula 2 round	Silverstone Formula 2 round	Next round: 2023 Silverstone Formula 2 round
