= 2023 Monte Carlo Formula 2 round =

Motor racing event

(Monaco) 2023 Monte Carlo Formula 2 round
Round details
- Round 5 of 13 in the 2023 FIA Formula 2 Championship.
- Location: Circuit de Monaco, Monte Carlo, Monaco
- Course: Street Circuit; 3.337 km (2.074 mi)

Sprint Race
- Date: 27 May 2023
- Laps: 30
Podium
First	(Japan) Ayumu Iwasa	DAMS
Second	(India) Jehan Daruvala	MP Motorsport
Third	(United States) Jak Crawford	Hitech Pulse-Eight
Fastest lap
Driver	(Australia) Jack Doohan	Invicta Virtuosi Racing
- Time: 1:22.819 (on lap 28)

Feature Race
- Date: 28 May 2023
- Laps: 39 (Note: The race was scheduled to be run for 42 laps, but was red-flagged for several minutes after an accident of Jack Doohan. Thus, the race distance has been shortened to 39 laps after exceeding the 60 minutes-time limit.)
Pole position
Driver	(Denmark) Frederik Vesti	Prema Racing
Time	1:21.053	
Podium
First	(Denmark) Frederik Vesti	Prema Racing
Second	(France) Théo Pourchaire	ART Grand Prix
Third	(Barbados) Zane Maloney	Rodin Carlin
Fastest lap
Driver	(France) Victor Martins	ART Grand Prix
- Time: 1:21.724 (on lap 32)

The 2023 Monte Carlo FIA Formula 2 round was a motor racing event held between 25 and 28 May 2023 at the Circuit de Monaco, Monte Carlo, Monaco. It was the fifth round of the 2023 FIA Formula 2 Championship and was held in support of the 2023 Monaco Grand Prix.

== Classification ==
=== Qualifying ===
==== Group A ====
Pos.	No.	Driver	Team	Time	Gap	Grid
1	6	(France) Victor Martins	ART Grand Prix	1:21.231	–	2
2	14	(Australia) Jack Doohan	Invicta Virtuosi Racing	1:21.432	+0.201	4
3	22	(Netherlands) Richard Verschoor	Van Amersfoort Racing	1:21.639	+0.408	6
4	2	(India) Jehan Daruvala	MP Motorsport	1:21.642	+0.411	8
5	10	(France) Isack Hadjar	Hitech Pulse-Eight	1:21.645	+0.414	10
6	24	(India) Kush Maini	Campos Racing	1:21.820	+0.589	12
7	4	(Brazil) Enzo Fittipaldi	Rodin Carlin	1:21.824	+0.593	14
8	8	(United Kingdom) Oliver Bearman	Prema Racing	1:22.201	+0.970	16
9	16	(Israel) Roy Nissany	PHM Racing by Charouz	1:22.804	+1.573	18
10	12	(Monaco) Arthur Leclerc	DAMS	1:23.340	+2.109	20
11	20	(Czech Republic) Roman Staněk	Trident	1:24.600	+3.639	22

==== Group B ====
Pos.	No.	Driver	Team	Time	Gap	Grid
1	7	(Denmark) Frederik Vesti	Prema Racing	1:21.053	–	1
2	5	(France) Théo Pourchaire	ART Grand Prix	1:21.105	+0.052	3
3	3	(Barbados) Zane Maloney	Rodin Carlin	1:21.463	+0.410	5
4	9	(United States) Jak Crawford	Hitech Pulse-Eight	1:21.576	+0.523	7
5	11	(Japan) Ayumu Iwasa	DAMS	1:21.796	+0.743	9
6	15	(Belgium) Amaury Cordeel	Invicta Virtuosi Racing	1:21.809	+0.756	11
7	23	(United States) Juan Manuel Correa	Van Amersfoort Racing	1:21.835	+0.782	13
8	21	(France) Clément Novalak	Trident	1:22.088	+1.035	15
9	1	(Norway) Dennis Hauger	MP Motorsport	1:22.097	+1.044	17
10	25	(Switzerland) Ralph Boschung	Campos Racing	1:22.182	+1.129	19
11	17	(United States) Brad Benavides	PHM Racing by Charouz	1:22.721	+1.668	21

=== Sprint race ===
Pos.	No.	Driver	Entrant	Laps	Time/Retired	Grid	Points
1	11	(Japan) Ayumu Iwasa	DAMS	30	46:39.033	2	10
2	2	(India) Jehan Daruvala	MP Motorsport	30	+6.678	3	8
3	9	(United States) Jak Crawford	Hitech Pulse-Eight	30	+8.335	4	6
4	22	(Netherlands) Richard Verschoor	Van Amersfoort Racing	30	+8.820	5	5
5	3	(Barbados) Zane Maloney	Rodin Carlin	30	+10.978	6	4
6	14	(Australia) Jack Doohan	Invicta Virtuosi Racing	30	+14.635	7	3
7	6	(France) Victor Martins	ART Grand Prix	30	+15.389	9	2 (1)
8	5	(France) Théo Pourchaire	ART Grand Prix	30	+17.369	8	1
9	7	(Denmark) Frederik Vesti	Prema Racing	30	+18.411	10	
10	4	(Brazil) Enzo Fittipaldi	Rodin Carlin	30	+18.801	14	
11	17	(United States) Brad Benavides	PHM Racing by Charouz	30	+20.541	21	
12	20	(Czech Republic) Roman Staněk	Trident	30	+21.352	22^{1}	
13	24	(India) Kush Maini	Campos Racing	30	+22.395	12	
14	12	(Monaco) Arthur Leclerc	DAMS	30	+22.962	20	
15	1	(Norway) Dennis Hauger	MP Motorsport	30	+25.049	17	
16	23	(United States) Juan Manuel Correa	Van Amersfoort Racing	30	+29.303^{2}	13	
17	21	(France) Clément Novalak	Trident	30	+38.434	15	
DNF	8	(United Kingdom) Oliver Bearman	Prema Racing	23	Suspension	16	
DNF	15	(Belgium) Amaury Cordeel	Invicta Virtuosi Racing	21	Accident	11	
DNF	10	(France) Isack Hadjar	Hitech Pulse-Eight	5	Driveshaft	1	
DNF	16	(Israel) Roy Nissany	PHM Racing by Charouz	0	Collision damage	18	
DNF	25	(Switzerland) Ralph Boschung	Campos Racing	0	Collision/Stalled	19	
Fastest lap set by (France) Victor Martins: 1:22.982 (lap 27)

Notes

- ^1 – Roman Staněk received a three-place grid drop for causing a collision with Ralph Boschung. Ultimately, the penalty has not affected his starting grid position for the next race he participated in.
- ^2 – Juan Manuel Correa originally finished eleventh, but was later given a ten-second time-penalty for causing a collision.

=== Feature race ===
Pos.	No.	Driver	Entrant	Laps	Time/Retired	Grid	Points
1	7	(Denmark) Frederik Vesti	Prema Racing	39	1:20:02.426	1	25 (2)
2	5	(France) Théo Pourchaire	ART Grand Prix	39	+2.504	3	18
3	3	(Barbados) Zane Maloney	Rodin Carlin	39	+15.553	5	15
4	22	(Netherlands) Richard Verschoor	Van Amersfoort Racing	39	+21.623	6	12
5	1	(Norway) Dennis Hauger	MP Motorsport	39	+22.364	17	10
6	24	(India) Kush Maini	Campos Racing	39	+25.317	12	8
7	20	(Czech Republic) Roman Staněk	Trident	39	+27.368	22	6
8	6	(France) Victor Martins	ART Grand Prix	39	+27.653	2	4 (1)
9	9	(United States) Jak Crawford	Hitech Pulse-Eight	39	+42.084	7	2
10	11	(Japan) Ayumu Iwasa	DAMS	39	+44.372	9	1
11	8	(United Kingdom) Oliver Bearman	Prema Racing	39	+45.253	16	
12	10	(France) Isack Hadjar	Hitech Pulse-Eight	39	+46.049	10	
13	2	(India) Jehan Daruvala	MP Motorsport	39	+54.559	8	
14	23	(United States) Juan Manuel Correa	Van Amersfoort Racing	39	+57.642	14	
15	16	(Israel) Roy Nissany	PHM Racing by Charouz	39	+1:12.052	18	
16	17	(United States) Brad Benavides	PHM Racing by Charouz	39	+1:12.410	21	
17	21	(France) Clément Novalak	Trident	39	+1:12.842	15	
DNF	25	(Switzerland) Ralph Boschung	Campos Racing	31	Mechanical	19	
DNF	14	(Australia) Jack Doohan	Invicta Virtuosi Racing	21	Accident	4	
NC	15	(Belgium) Amaury Cordeel	Invicta Virtuosi Racing	21	+18 laps (Engine)	11	
DNF	4	(Brazil) Enzo Fittipaldi	Rodin Carlin	17	Engine failure	13	
DNF	12	(Monaco) Arthur Leclerc	DAMS	7	Brakes	20	
Fastest lap set by (France) Victor Martins: 1:21.724 (lap 32)

== Standings after the event ==
Drivers' Championship standings

	Pos.	Driver	Points
1	1	(Denmark) Frederik Vesti	89
1	2	(France) Théo Pourchaire	84
	3	(Japan) Ayumu Iwasa	69
1	4	(India) Kush Maini	49
1	5	(Norway) Dennis Hauger	48

Teams' Championship standings

	Pos.	Team	Points
	1	(Italy) Prema Racing	130
1	2	(France) ART Grand Prix	108
1	3	(France) DAMS	103
1	4	(Netherlands) MP Motorsport	88
1	5	(Spain) Campos Racing	82

- Note: Only the top five positions are included for both sets of standings.

== See also ==
- 2023 Monaco Grand Prix
- 2023 Monte Carlo Formula 3 round

== Notes ==
Previous round: 2023 Baku Formula 2 round	FIA Formula 2 Championship; 2023 season	Next round: 2023 Barcelona Formula 2 round
Previous round: 2022 Monte Carlo Formula 2 round	Monte Carlo Formula 2 round	Next round: 2024 Monte Carlo Formula 2 round
