= 2023 Spielberg Formula 2 round =

Motor racing event

(Austria) 2023 Spielberg Formula 2 round
Round details
- Round 7 of 13 in the 2023 FIA Formula 2 Championship.
- Location: Red Bull Ring, Spielberg, Styria, Austria
- Course: Permanent racing facility 4.318 km (2.683 mi)

Sprint Race
- Date: 1 July 2023
- Laps: 27
Podium
First	(United States) Jak Crawford	Hitech Pulse-Eight
Second	(France) Victor Martins	ART Grand Prix
Third	(France) Isack Hadjar	Hitech Pulse-Eight
Fastest lap
Driver	(Barbados) Zane Maloney	Rodin Carlin
- Time: 1:17.294 (on lap 20)

Feature Race
- Date: 2 July 2023
- Laps: 40
Pole position
Driver	(France) Victor Martins	ART Grand Prix
Time	1:14.643	
Podium
First	(Netherlands) Richard Verschoor	Van Amersfoort Racing
Second	(Japan) Ayumu Iwasa	DAMS
Third	(Denmark) Frederik Vesti	Prema Racing
Fastest lap
Driver	(Japan) Ayumu Iwasa	DAMS
- Time: 1:17.575 (on lap 37)

The 2023 Spielberg Formula 2 round was a motor racing event held between 30 June and 2 July 2023 at the Red Bull Ring. It was the seventh round of the 2023 Formula 2 Championship and was held in support of the 2023 Austrian Grand Prix.

== Classification ==
=== Qualifying ===
Pos.	No.	Driver	Entrant	Time	Grid SR	Grid FR
1	6	(France) Victor Martins	ART Grand Prix	1:14.643	10	1
2	7	(Denmark) Frederik Vesti	Prema Racing	+0.139	9	2
3	5	(France) Théo Pourchaire	ART Grand Prix	+0.170	8	3
4	24	(India) Kush Maini	Campos Racing	+0.215	7	4
5	14	(Australia) Jack Doohan	Invicta Virtuosi Racing	+0.217	6	5
6	4	(Brazil) Enzo Fittipaldi	Rodin Carlin	+0.310	5	9^{3}
7	15	(Belgium) Amaury Cordeel	Invicta Virtuosi Racing	+0.344	4	6
8	12	(Monaco) Arthur Leclerc	DAMS	+0.374	3	7
9	2	(India) Jehan Daruvala	MP Motorsport	+0.442	2	8
10	9	(United States) Jak Crawford	Hitech Pulse-Eight	+0.444	1	10
11	22	(Netherlands) Richard Verschoor	Van Amersfoort Racing	+0.485	11	11
12	23	(United States) Juan Manuel Correa	Van Amersfoort Racing	+0.560	12	12
13	1	(Norway) Dennis Hauger	MP Motorsport	+0.594	13	13
14	16	(Israel) Roy Nissany	PHM Racing by Charouz	+0.601	14	14
15	3	(Barbados) Zane Maloney	Rodin Carlin	+0.731	15	15
16	11	(Japan) Ayumu Iwasa	DAMS	+0.826	16	16
17	20	(Czech Republic) Roman Staněk	Trident	+0.859	17	17
18	17	(United States) Brad Benavides	PHM Racing by Charouz	+1.007	18	18
19	8	(United Kingdom) Oliver Bearman	Prema Racing	+1.047	19	19
20	21	(France) Clément Novalak	Trident	+1.059	20	20
21	10	(France) Isack Hadjar	Hitech Pulse-Eight	+1.165	21^{1}	21
22	25	(Switzerland) Ralph Boschung	Campos Racing	+1.185	22^{2}	22

Notes

- ^1 - Isack Hadjar received a three-place grid penalty for the Sprint Race for impeding Jack Doohan during Qualifying.
- ^2 – Ralph Boschung was handed a three-place grid drop for the Sprint Race for failing to follow the Race Director's instructions in free practice.
- ^3 - Enzo Fittipaldi was handed a three-place grid drop foe the Feature Race for causing a collision with Kush Maini in Sprint Race.

=== Sprint race ===
Pos.	No.	Driver	Entrant	Laps	Time/Retired	Grid	Points
1	9	(United States) Jak Crawford	Hitech Pulse-Eight	27	39:36:231	1	10
2	6	(France) Victor Martins	ART Grand Prix	27	+2.286	10	8 (1)
3	10	(France) Isack Hadjar	Hitech Pulse-Eight	27	+4.366	21	6
4	23	(United States) Juan Manuel Correa	Van Amersfoort Racing	27	+9.524	12	5
5	20	(Czech Republic) Roman Staněk	Trident	27	+10.175	17	4
6	1	(Norway) Dennis Hauger	MP Motorsport	27	+10.628	13	3
7	14	(Australia) Jack Doohan	Invicta Virtuosi Racing	27	+11.401	6	2
8	8	(United Kingdom) Oliver Bearman	Prema Racing	27	+12.458	19	1
9	7	(Denmark) Frederik Vesti	Prema Racing	27	+12.923	9	
10	16	(Israel) Roy Nissany	PHM Racing by Charouz	27	+13.538	PL	
11	11	(Japan) Ayumu Iwasa	DAMS	27	+17.758	16	
12	17	(United States) Brad Benavides	PHM Racing by Charouz	27	+19.090	18	
13	12	(Monaco) Arthur Leclerc	DAMS	27	+20.607	3	
14	5	(France) Théo Pourchaire	ART Grand Prix	27	+22.030^{1}	8	
15	15	(Belgium) Amaury Cordeel	Invicta Virtuosi Racing	27	+22.205	4	
16	24	(India) Kush Maini	Campos Racing	27	+36.487^{2}	7	
17	25	(Switzerland) Ralph Boschung	Campos Racing	27	+36.896^{3}	22	
18	3	(Barbados) Zane Maloney	Rodin Carlin	27	+1:01.478	15	
DNF	4	(Brazil) Enzo Fittipaldi	Rodin Carlin	17	Spun off	5	
DNF	22	(Netherlands) Richard Verschoor	Van Amersfoort Racing	4	Spun off	11	
DNF	2	(India) Jehan Daruvala	MP Motorsport	0	Spun off	2	
DSQ	21	(France) Clément Novalak	Trident	27	Disqualified^{4}	20	
Fastest lap set by (Barbados) Zane Maloney: 1:17.294 (lap 20)

Notes

- ^1 - Théo Pourchaire received a 5-second time penalty for unsafe release.
- ^2 – Kush Maini received a 20-second time penalty for forcing Enzo Fittipaldi off track.
- ^3 – Ralph Boschung was given a 10-second time penalty for forcing Amaury Cordeel off track.
- ^4 – Clément Novalak was disqualified from the sprint race after it was found that his car's rear tyre pressures were below the limit required by Article 12.9 of the Technical Regulations. As a result, Isack Hadjar was promoted to the final podium position.

=== Feature race ===
Pos.	No.	Driver	Entrant	Laps	Time/Retired	Grid	Points
1	22	(Netherlands) Richard Verschoor	Van Amersfoort Racing	40	56:31.050	11	25
2	11	(Japan) Ayumu Iwasa	DAMS	40	+0.415	16	18 (1)
3	7	(Denmark) Frederik Vesti	Prema Racing	40	+1.921	2	15
4	14	(Australia) Jack Doohan	Invicta Virtuosi Racing	40	+2.222	5	12
5	8	(United Kingdom) Oliver Bearman	Prema Racing	40	+2.860	19	10
6	4	(Brazil) Enzo Fittipaldi	Rodin Carlin	40	+3.147	9	8
7	5	(France) Théo Pourchaire	ART Grand Prix	40	+6.714	3	6
8	9	(United States) Jak Crawford	Hitech Pulse-Eight	40	+7.348	10	4
9	6	(France) Victor Martins	ART Grand Prix	40	+7.971	1	2 (2)
10	2	(India) Jehan Daruvala	MP Motorsport	40	+9.343	8	1
11	1	(Norway) Dennis Hauger	MP Motorsport	40	+9.582	13	
12	10	(France) Isack Hadjar	Hitech Pulse-Eight	40	+9.915	21	
13	21	(France) Clément Novalak	Trident	40	+11.594	20	
14	25	(Switzerland) Ralph Boschung	Campos Racing	40	+13.020	22	
15	3	(Barbados) Zane Maloney	Rodin Carlin	40	+14.622	15	
16	16	(Israel) Roy Nissany	PHM Racing by Charouz	40	+15.054	14	
17	15	(Belgium) Amaury Cordeel	Invicta Virtuosi Racing	40	+17.355	6	
18	23	(United States) Juan Manuel Correa	Van Amersfoort Racing	40	+17.740	12	
19	17	(United States) Brad Benavides	PHM Racing by Charouz	40	+20.467	18	
DNF	24	(India) Kush Maini	Campos Racing	33	Collision damage	4	
DNF	12	(Monaco) Arthur Leclerc	DAMS	26	Lost wheel	7	
DNF	20	(Czech Republic) Roman Staněk	Trident	25	Clutch	17	
Fastest lap set by (Japan) Ayumu Iwasa: 1:17.575 (lap 37)

== Standings after the event ==
Drivers' Championship standings

	Pos.	Driver	Points
	1	(Denmark) Frederik Vesti	125
	2	(France) Théo Pourchaire	105
	3	(Japan) Ayumu Iwasa	101
	4	(United Kingdom) Oliver Bearman	81
2	5	(Netherlands) Richard Verschoor	75

Teams' Championship standings

	Pos.	Team	Points
	1	(Italy) Prema Racing	206
	2	(France) ART Grand Prix	163
	3	(France) DAMS	137
1	4	(United Kingdom) Rodin Carlin	105
1	5	(Netherlands) MP Motorsport	101

- Note: Only the top five positions are included for both sets of standings.

== See also ==
- 2023 Austrian Grand Prix
- 2023 Spielberg Formula 3 round

Previous round: 2023 Barcelona Formula 2 round	FIA Formula 2 Championship; 2023 season	Next round: 2023 Silverstone Formula 2 round
Previous round: 2022 Spielberg Formula 2 round	Spielberg Formula 2 round	Next round: 2024 Spielberg Formula 2 round
