= Ayumu Iwasa =

Japanese racing driver (born 2001)

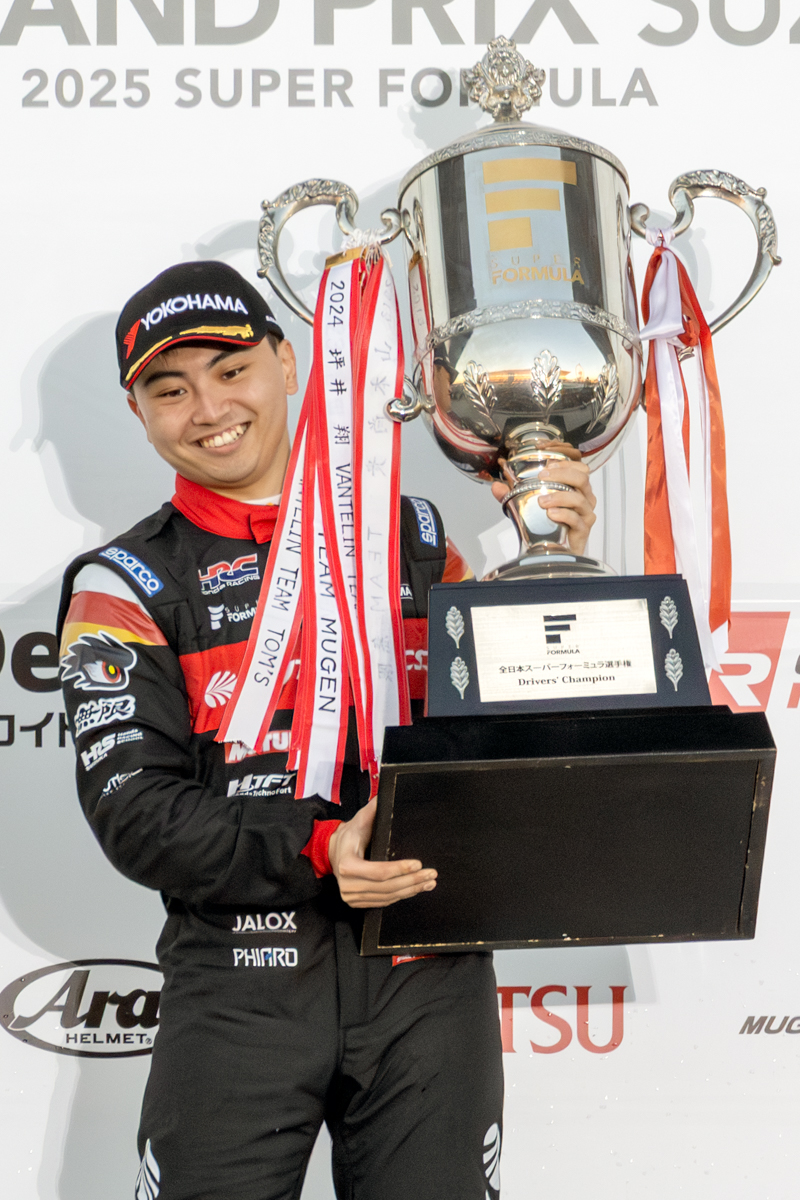
- Iwasa at Suzuka Circuit in November 2025
- Nationality: (Japan) Japanese
- Born: 22 September 2001 (age 25) Moriguchi, Osaka, Japan

Super Formula career
- Debut season: 2024
- Current team: Team Mugen
- Car number: 15
- Starts: 31
- Wins: 3
- Podiums: 14
- Poles: 7
- Fastest laps: 3
- Best finish: 1st in 2025

Previous series
- 2022–2023; 2021; 2021; 2020; 2019; 2017–2018; 2017: FIA Formula 2; FIA Formula 3; F3 Asian; French F4; Super FJ - Suzuka Series; F4 Japanese; Asian Formula Renault

Championship titles
- 2025; 2021; 2020: Super Formula; F3 Asia - Rookie Cup; French F4

Awards
- 2022: Anthoine Hubert Award

Ayumu Iwasa (Japanese: 岩佐 歩夢, Hepburn: Iwasa Ayumu; Japanese pronunciation: [iɰᵝa̠sa̠ a̠jɯ̟ᵝmɯ̟ᵝ], born 22 September 2001) is a Japanese racing driver who currently competes in the Super Formula Championship for Team Mugen, winning the championship in 2025.

A member of the Honda Formula Dream Project and Red Bull Junior Team, Iwasa previously competed with DAMS in the FIA Formula 2 Championship, earning the Anthoine Hubert Award (Note: The Anthoine Hubert award is FIA Formula 2's equivalent of a rookie of the year award, named after Anthoine Hubert.) by finishing fifth overall in 2022 before finishing fourth the following year. He is the 2020 French F4 champion.

== Junior racing career ==
=== Karting (2005–2016) ===
Iwasa began karting in Japan in 2005 and started competing nationally in 2014. During his karting career, he won the 2014 Suzuka Karting Championship Yamaha-SS Class and later became champion of the Suzuka Karting Championship X-30 class. He also competed in the JAF Junior Karting Championship FP category.

=== Formula 4 (2017–2020) ===
==== 2017–2019: Racing in Japan ====
Iwasa made his single-seater debut in 2017, contesting two rounds of the F4 Japanese Championship with B-Max Racing and finishing fifteenth in both races. He also competed in two races of the Asian Formula Renault Series, taking pole position for both and finishing runner-up on each occasion. In 2018, Iwasa returned for a part-time campaign in Japanese F4, with Rn-Sports, scoring points on his debut weekend, and later finished third in the final round of the JAF F4 Suzuka Series.

In 2019, Iwasa contested the Suzuka regional championship in Super FJ. Although he lost out to Ryūnosuke Sawa for the Suzuka championship title, he would go on to beat out the likes of Sawa, Reimei Ito, Yūgo Iwasawa, and Riki Okusa to win the season-ending All-Japan Masters Race. Iwasa also contested the Suzuka Racing School Single Seater Series and won the championship, earning him support from the Honda Formula Dream Project at the end of the year.

==== 2020: French F4 champion ====
For 2020, Iwasa joined the French F4 Championship as a Honda Junior Driver. He immediately established himself as the title favourite by winning two of the opening three races. After a winless second round at Magny-Cours, he dominated the remainder of the season, claiming two victories in each of the next three rounds. Iwasa secured the championship with three races remaining after taking a double pole position during the final round at Paul Ricard. Over the season, he scored nine victories, five pole positions and fifteen podium finishes, finishing on the podium in every round and never placing lower than sixth in a race.

=== Formula Three (2021) ===
At the start of 2021, Iwasa competed in the F3 Asian Championship, partnering Roy Nissany, Roman Staněk and Reece Ushijima. He scored his only podium of the campaign in the first race of the fourth round at the Dubai Autodrome and ended up eighth in the championship. Following the championship, Iwasa stated that he needed to "control his psyche".

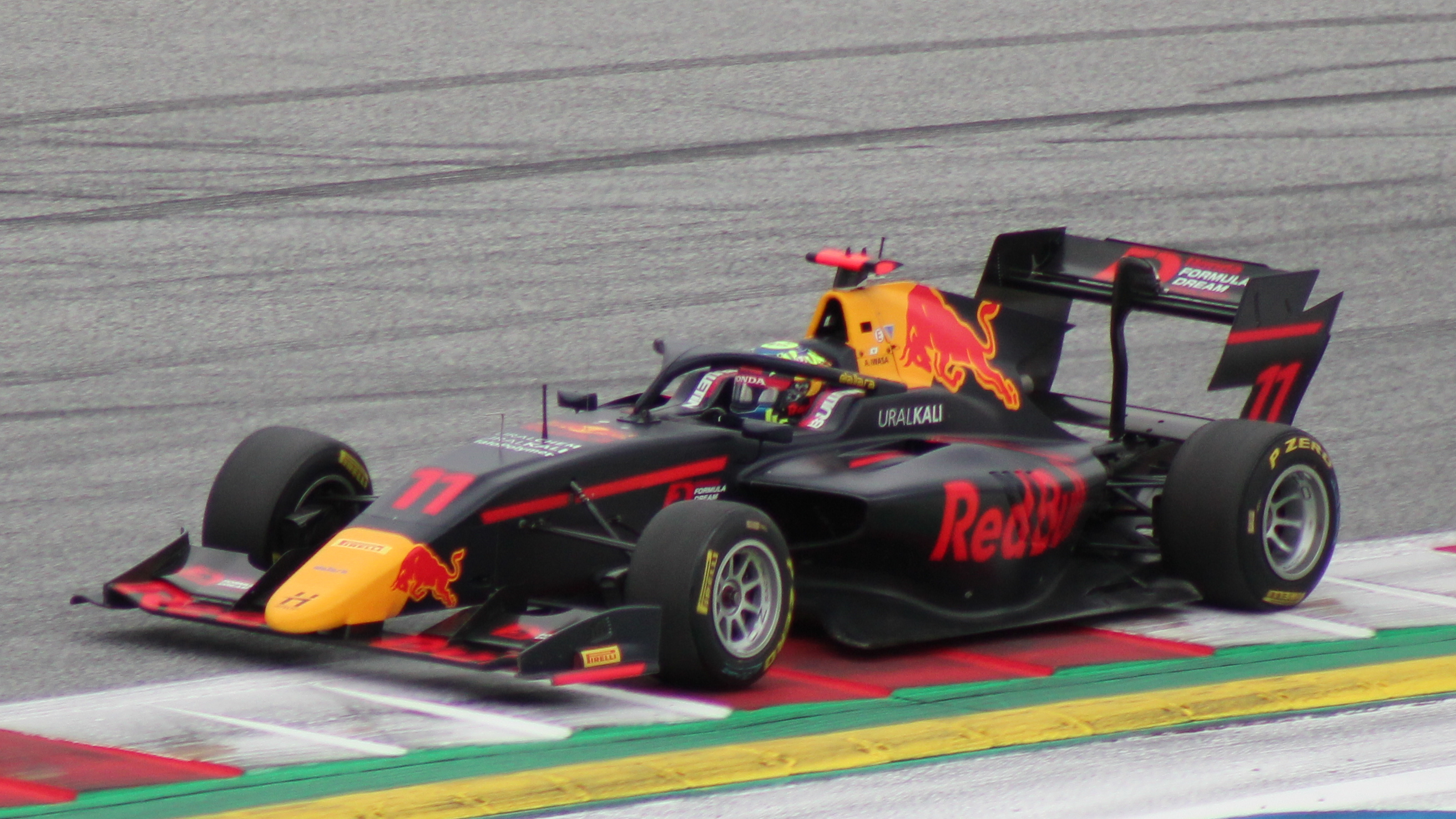
Iwasa driving the Dallara F3 2019 during the 2021 Spielberg Formula 3 round.

Iwasa's primary programme in 2021 was the FIA Formula 3 Championship, where he remained with Hitech Grand Prix alongside Roman Staněk and fellow Red Bull Junior Jak Crawford. His campaign began quietly in Barcelona, where he scored his first points of the season with seventh place in Race 2. He showed improved pace in Paul Ricard, qualifying eighth and crossing the line third in the opening race before a time penalty for gaining an advantage off-track dropped him to eighth. He nevertheless added further points with ninth and seventh place in Race 2 and 3 respectively. At the Red Bull Ring, Iwasa recovered from a difficult qualifying session to score points in the final race of the weekend, finishing sixth after being disqualified from Race 1 for failing to comply with a black-and-orange flag instruction. His breakthrough came in Hungary, where he inherited victory in Race 1 after on-road winner Lorenzo Colombo received a post-race penalty, securing Iwasa's maiden FIA Formula 3 victory. He added further points during the weekend with tenth place in Race 2. A scoreless round in Spa-Francorchamps interrupted his momentum, but Iwasa returned to the podium in Zandvoort, finishing third in the opening race after qualifying ninth. He scored minor points in Sochi, and ended the season twelfth in the championship, fourth among rookies. Iwasa also outscored both of his teammates over the course of the campaign.

=== FIA Formula 2 (2022–2023) ===
==== 2022 ====
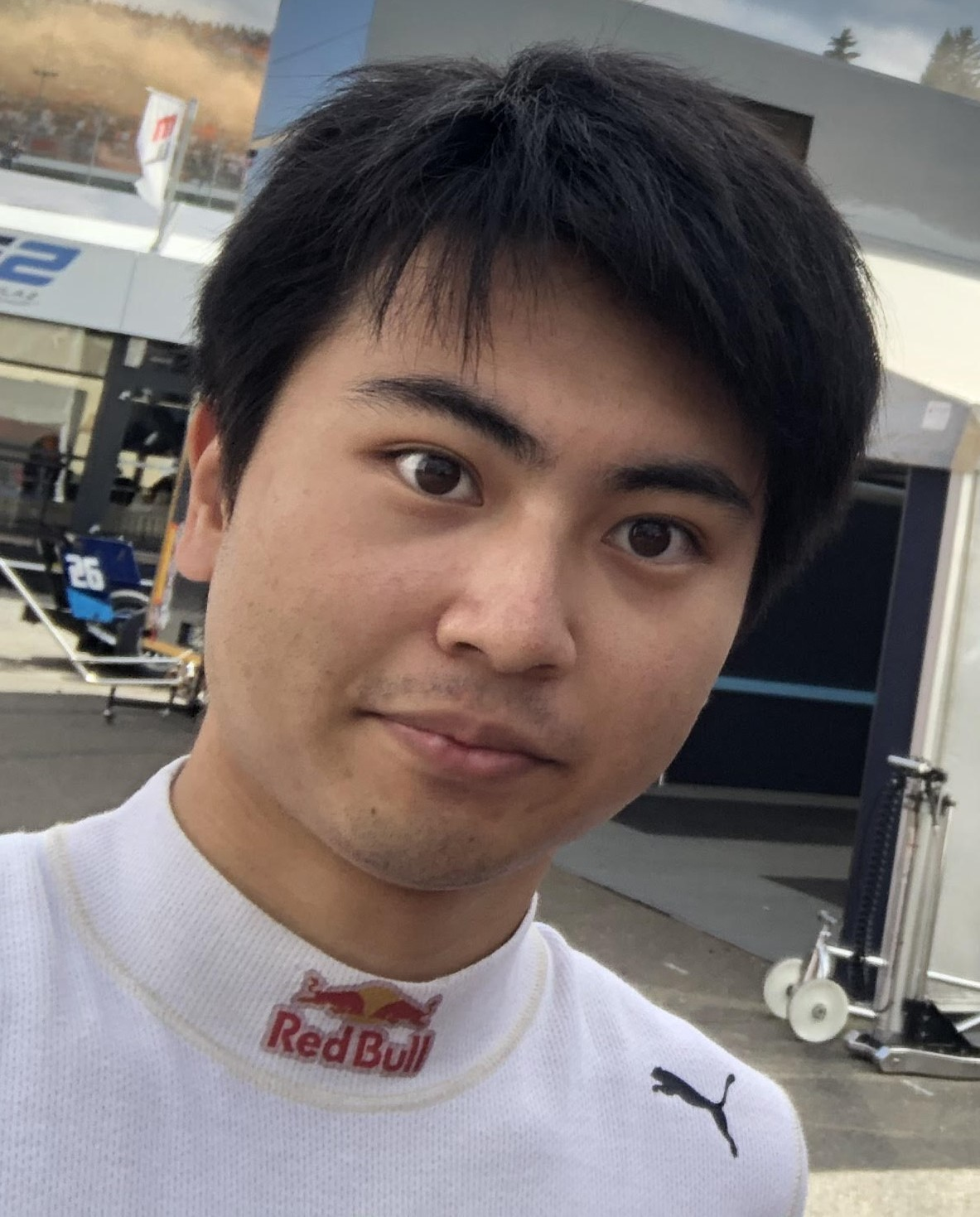
Iwasa at the Red Bull Ring in 2022

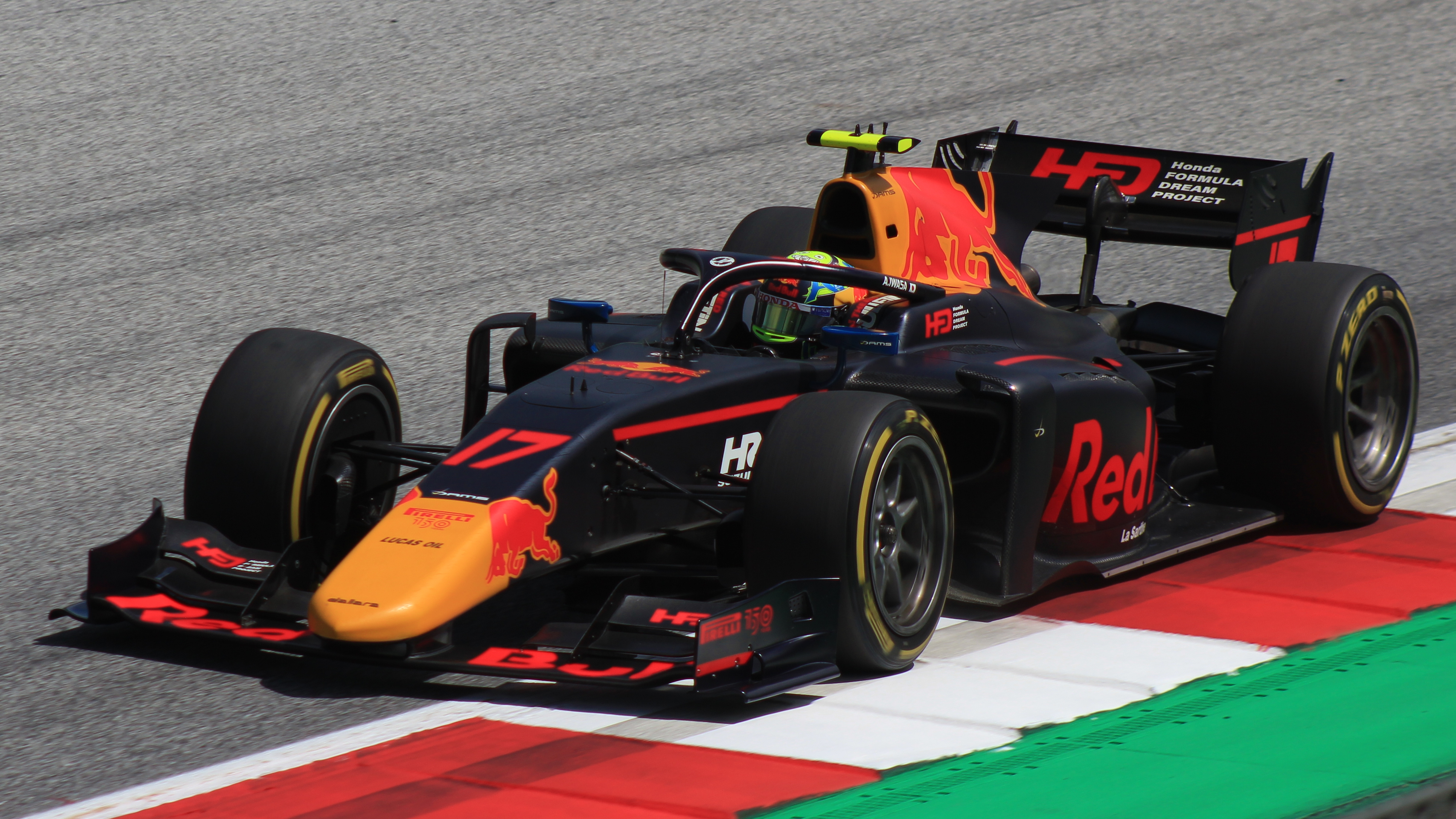
Iwasa driving the Dallara F2 2018 during the 2022 Spielberg Formula 2 round.

Iwasa stepped up to Formula 2 with DAMS IN 2022, alongside Roy Nissany. Ahead of his debut season, Iwasa stated that he intended to adopt a more aggressive approach than he had in Formula 3. In the Bahrain opener, a car issue confined him to last in qualifying. Iwasa recovered impressively to score a point on his Formula 2 debut by climbing to eighth in the sprint race, although a technical problem denied him further points in the feature race after he had briefly led the race. He continued to impress in Jeddah with points finishes in both races after qualifying fifth. In Imola, Iwasa secured a front-row start and converted it into fifth place in the feature race despite losing time during a double-stack pit stop. He earned his first Formula 2 podium in Barcelona, finishing second after making up places in the reverse-grid sprint. Contact with Jehan Daruvala early in the feature race, however, forced an unscheduled pit stop and left him outside the points.

Monaco proved to be his first scoreless weekend after a qualifying infringement relegated him to starts outside the top 10 for both races. Further incidents in both races compounded a difficult weekend, though he returned to the points in Baku by recovering to eighth in the sprint race. In the feature race, he sustained damage following contact during a safety car restart, and placed fourteenth. In Silverstone, Iwasa finished second in the sprint race after overtaking three rivals in quick succession, narrowly missing out on victory to Jack Doohan. In the feature race, Iwasa had a good getaway at the start, jumping to fourth but a terrible pit stop saw him far from the frontrunners and he finished in 12th. In Austria, a penalty for forcing Logan Sargeant off the circuit dropped him out of the points in the sprint race, though he recovered to seventh in the feature despite starting on wet tyres on a drying track. Iwasa's breakthrough victory came in Paul Ricard after qualifying on the front row. He finished sixth in the sprint before controlling the feature race to secure his maiden Formula 2 win by almost nine seconds. He maintained his momentum in Hungary, taking his first Formula 2 pole position before finishing third in the feature race, leaving him seventh in the standings at the summer break.

Iwasa continued his consistent run with seventh in the Spa-Francorchamps feature race after an alternate strategy recovery, before claiming a third-placed podium in the Zandvoort feature race after qualifying fifth. In Monza, Iwasa qualified seventh after a crash at the Parabolica corner. Starting fourth, he made up positions in the feature race and was initially set for back-to-back third places, but was later disqualified after the plank on his car was found to be below the minimum thickness. He responded by taking his second pole position of the season in Yas Marina and converted it into his second victory, holding off newly crowned champion Felipe Drugovich in the feature race. Iwasa finished fifth in the championship with 141 points, recording two victories and six podiums. Despite ending the season as the second-highest placed rookie, he was awarded the Anthoine Hubert Award.

==== 2023 ====
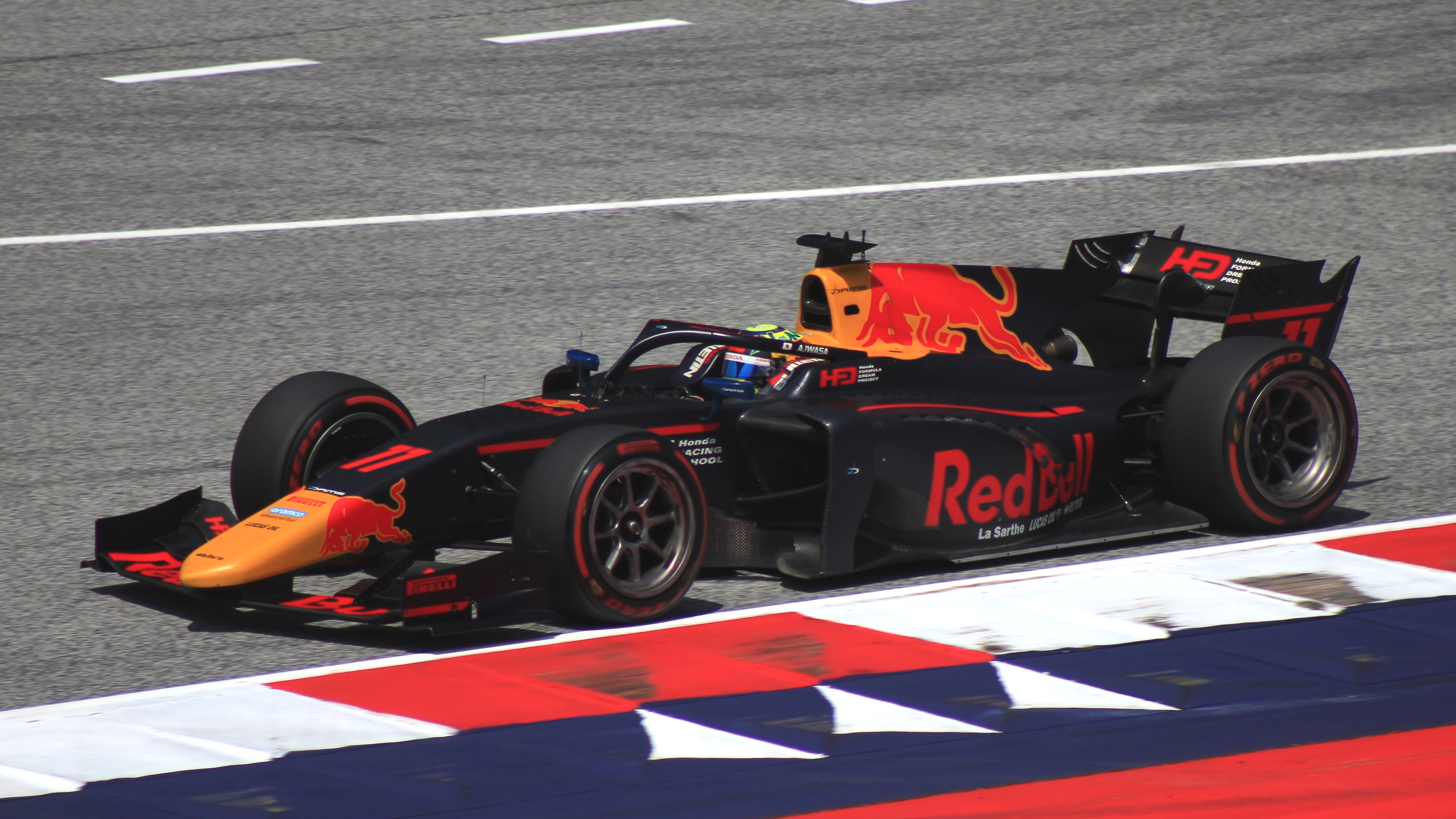
Iwasa driving for DAMS during the 2023 Spielberg Formula 2 round.

Iwasa continued with DAMS for the 2023 campaign, alongside Ferrari Driver Academy member Arthur Leclerc. Iwasa qualified seventh for the Bahrain opening round, and ended the sprint race in fourth. He struggled in the feature race but secured eighth place. In Jeddah, he did one place better in qualifying, and in the sprint race, he shot into the lead by overtaking three rivals on the opening lap. He was put under intense pressure from behind, but managed take his first win of the season. Iwasa finished fourth in the feature race, and thus was the only driver to score points in all four of the opening two rounds. Iwasa took his first pole of the year in Melbourne. His points streak would come to an end after a broken front wing on the opening lap of the sprint, but in the feature race Iwasa controlled things perfectly for the win and the standings lead. Iwasa struggled in Baku after a poor qualifying left him down in 17th and finished both races outside the points, dropping to third in the standings.

In Monaco, Iwasa qualified in ninth. He would inherit the lead after Isack Hadjar suffered mechanical issues ahead, and go on to win comfortably. He finished tenth in the feature race, after a late red flag saw drivers aheadwho did not pit make up positions. Iwasa qualified fourth Barcelona, and contact in the sprint race dropped him to tenth. He managed to find his form and work his way to eighth. In the feature race, Iwasa passed Théo Pourchaire following the pit stops, but towards the end was overtaken by a faster Victor Martins, forced to settle with fourth. In Austria, Iwasa had his worst qualifying of the year yet, down in 16th. A wrong tyre choice meant that he finished in 11th. Opting on the alternate strategy for the feature race, luck was on his side as teammate Leclerc brought on the safety car, and both pitted jumping the lead alternate strategy runner Enzo Fittipaldi, who missed the pit entry. He would charge all the way to second place and nearly taking the win away from Richard Verschoor.

In Silverstone, Iwasa qualified in third having topped practice. In the sprint race, he encountered a problem and dropped to 21st place right on the first lap, and would finish there. He had a good start in the feature race, nearly taking the lead from Martins. On lap 16, he was pushed wide by Zane Maloney as he overtook him, which caused Iwasa to lose a further two positions. He managed to end in fifth place. Iwasa qualified sixth in Hungary, and a terrific start from fifth moved him to second in the sprint race, where he scored yet another podium. He opted for the alternate strategy during the feature race which rewarded with a higher finish, ending in fourth place after passing Isack Hadjar late on. Iwasa was unlucky during Spa-Francorchamps qualifying, securing only 16th due to unpredictable rain weather. He made up for lost positions by charging to seventh place in the sprint race. However the feature race was much less successful, as Iwasa spun on the first lap, and was taken out after being collected by Dennis Hauger. Iwasa was then given a five-place grid penalty for the next race.

Iwasa had a weekend to forget in Zandvoort, the sprint race cancelled due to heavy rain and his feature race was compromised after early contact with Kush Maini. Iwasa qualified 15th in Monza, and retired from the sprint race due to a car issue. His feature race was action-packed, having briefly led the race yet to pit in a safety car-strewn race. After pitting, he was soon up to third, and completed his charge by passing Pourchaire to claim second place. Needing to have take maximum points to even have a chance of winning the title, Qualifying fifth for the Abu Dhabi season finale, he finished eighth in the sprint race. Struggling throughout the feature race, Iwasa would inherit two positions on the last lap and finish in fourth. He concluded the season fourth in the standings, amassing 165 points, one pole, three wins and three other podiums.

== Formula One and Super Formula career ==
=== Formula One ===
At the beginning of 2021, Iwasa was officially announced as a Red Bull Junior.

Iwasa made his F1 test debut in November 2023, driving the AlphaTauri AT04 during the young drivers' test. Despite a late car issue, the Japanese driver wrapped up 96 laps to put him 15th overall.

Iwasa made his debut in an official Formula One race weekend for the 2024 Japanese Grand Prix, driving for RB in the first practice session in place of Daniel Ricciardo. He placed 16th in his F1 debut, a second behind his RB teammate Yuki Tsunoda. Later that year, Iwasa participated in free practice during the 2024 Abu Dhabi Grand Prix, finishing the session in 17th. He drove the VCARB 01 again during the young drivers' test, completing 110 laps overall.

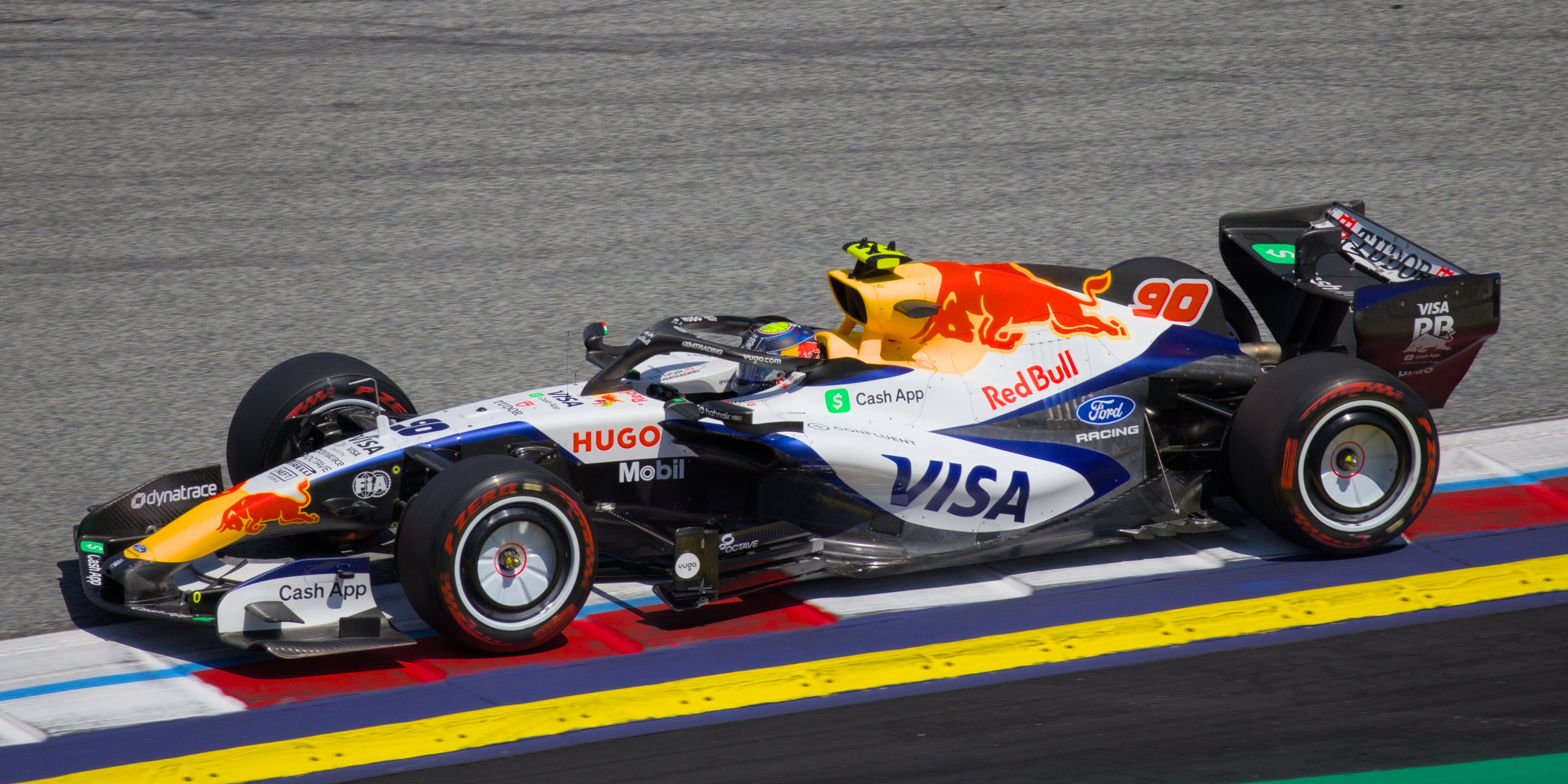
Iwasa testing the Racing Bulls VCARB 03 during the FP1 of the 2026 Austrian Grand Prix

At the start of the year, Iwasa took part in a private test, driving the AlphaTauri AT04 at the Imola Circuit. Iwasa also participated in the first free practice session for the 2025 Bahrain Grand Prix, driving for Red Bull Racing in place of Max Verstappen. In late June, Iwasa once again drove the AT04 in Imola as part of a testing of previous car (TPC) programme. He participated in further free practice sessions with Racing Bulls at the Mexico City and the Abu Dhabi Grand Prix. Iwasa then drove for Red Bull during the Yas Marina post-season test, completing 121 laps.

Iwasa continued as the test and reserve driver for Racing Bulls during the 2026 season. He competed in his first free practice session of the year with Red Bull at the Barcelona-Catalunya Grand Prix. He later completed three further practice sessions that year; one with Racing Bulls at the Austrian Grand Prix, and two with Red Bull at the Italian and Mexico City Grand Prix.

=== Super Formula (2024–present) ===
==== 2024 season ====
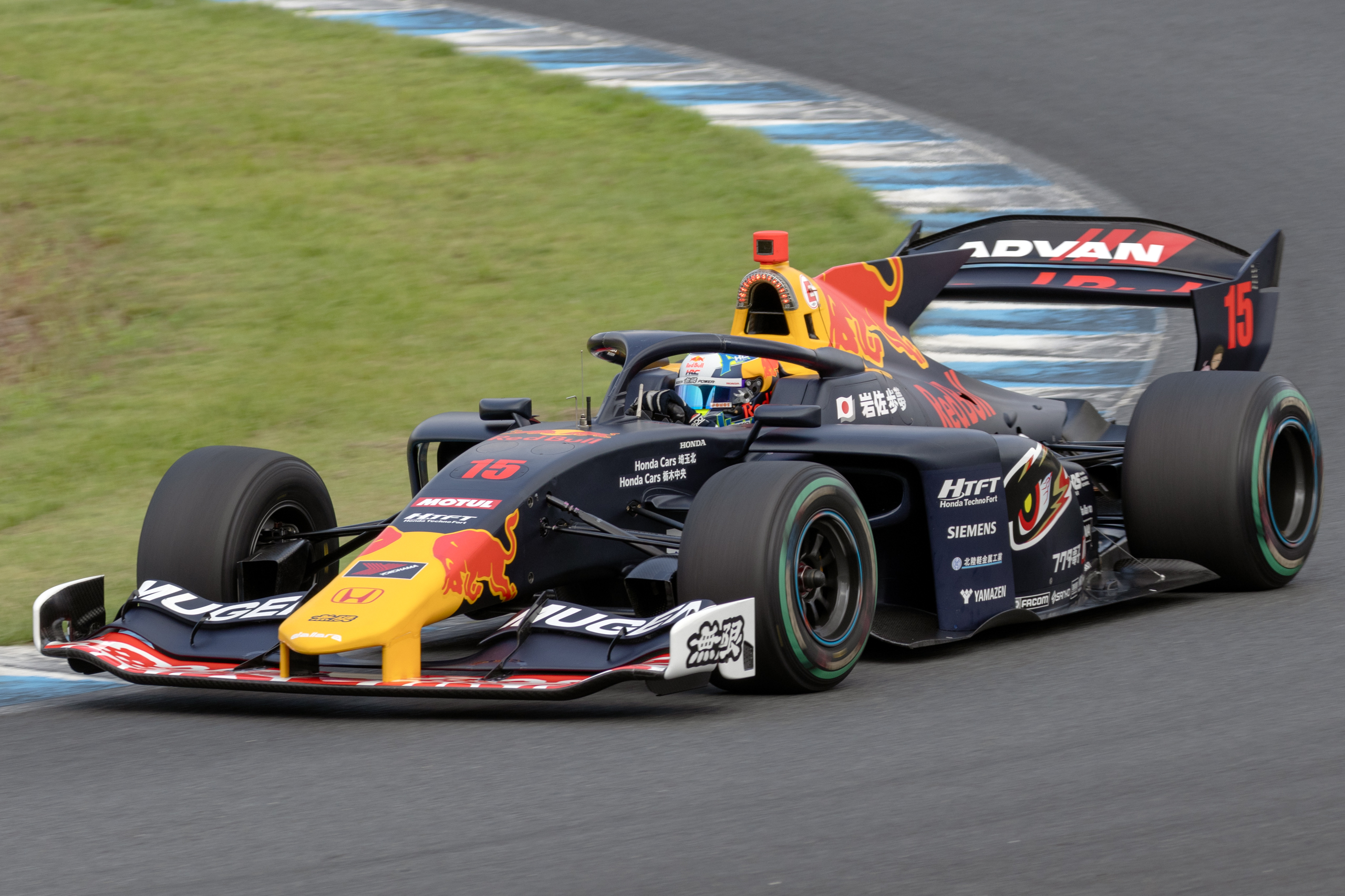
Iwasa driving for Team Mugen at the 2024 Super Formula Motegi round

Iwasa left Formula 2 and moved back to Japan in 2024 for Super Formula, joining Team Mugen alongside two-time series champion Tomoki Nojiri. Despite seeing it as a negative career move, he eventually felt as a "meaningful step up". In just his second race in Autopolis, Iwasa secured his first pole. Wheelspin at the start saw him lose the lead to Tadasuke Makino, and settled there as he collected his first podium of the campaign. He again finished runner-up the following round in Sportsland Sugo in a race that ended early due to a crash. However, a disastrous start in the first Fuji round left Iwasa 11th at the flag, calling the team to "get its act together". Despite that, the first race during the second Fuji round yielded yet another second placed podium. A disappointing end to the season in the second Suzuka round, owing to poor starts left Iwasa finishing the races ninth and seventh respectively. Iwasa ended the season fifth in the standings with 63.5 points, with a total of three podiums.

==== 2025 season ====
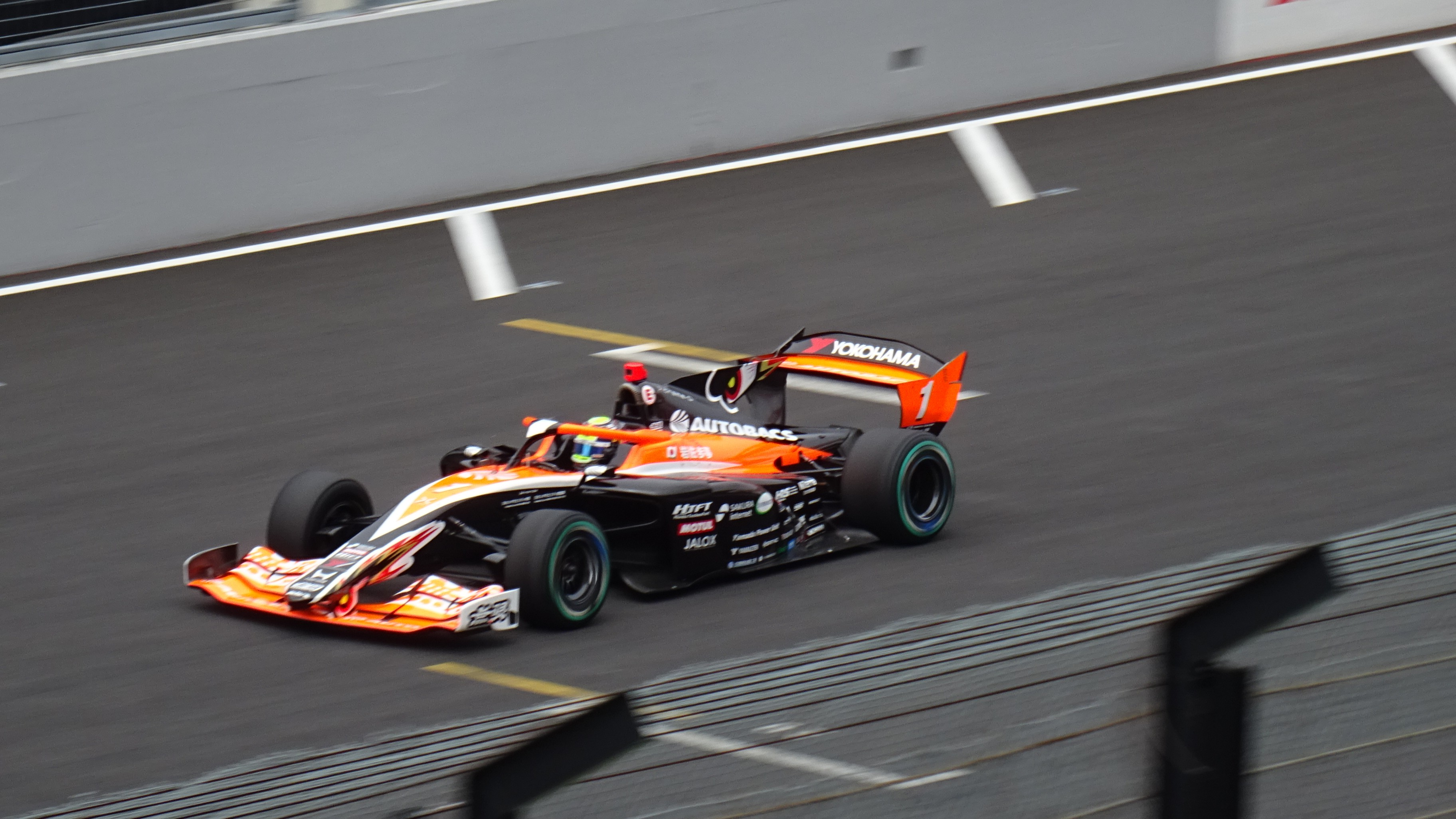
Iwasa qualifying at the Suzuka Circuit in 2026

Iwasa continued with Team Mugen for the 2025 season. During this season, he won the Drivers' Championship.

==== 2026 season ====
Iwasa continued with Team Mugen for the 2026 season after winning the title the previous year.

== Personal life ==
Iwasa is a graduate of Osaka International Senior High School. Iwasa hails from a family with a history in motorsport; both of his parents participated in Honda Civic spec races in the 1990s, and his grandfather also raced competitively.

== Racing record ==
=== Racing career summary ===
| Season | Series | Team | Races | Wins | Poles | F/Laps | Podiums | Points | Position |
|---|---|---|---|---|---|---|---|---|---|
| 2017 | F4 Japanese Championship | B-Max Racing Team | 2 | 0 | 0 | 0 | 0 | 0 | 28th |
| 2017 | Asian Formula Renault Series | Asia Racing Team | 2 | 0 | 2 | 1 | 2 | 48 | 13th |
| 2018 | F4 Japanese Championship | Rn-sports | 2 | 0 | 0 | 0 | 0 | 8 | 17th |
| 2018 | JAF Formula 4 - West Series | Rn-sports | 1 | 0 | 0 | 0 | 1 | 12 | 12th |
| 2019 | Super-FJ Suzuka Series | Seido-ya Rn-sports | 6 | 2 | 1 | 3 | 4 | 73 | **2nd** |
| 2019 | Super FJ - All-Japan Final | Seido-ya Rn-sports | 1 | 1 | 1 | 0 | 1 | N/A | **1st** |
| 2019 | Super Taikyū - ST-4 | Tracy Sports SPV Racing | 1 | 0 | 0 | 0 | 0 | 65‡ | 5th‡ |
| 2020 | French F4 Championship | FFSA Academy | 21 | 9 | 5 | 7 | 15 | 338 | **1st** |
| 2021 | FIA Formula 3 Championship | Hitech Grand Prix | 20 | 1 | 0 | 0 | 2 | 52 | 12th |
| 2021 | F3 Asian Championship | Hitech Grand Prix | 15 | 0 | 0 | 0 | 1 | 82 | 8th |
| 2022 | FIA Formula 2 Championship | DAMS | 28 | 2 | 2 | 1 | 6 | 141 | 5th |
| 2023 | FIA Formula 2 Championship | DAMS | 26 | 3 | 1 | 3 | 6 | 165 | 4th |
| 2024 | Super Formula | Team Mugen | 9 | 0 | 1 | 0 | 3 | 63.5 | 5th |
| 2024 | Formula One | Visa Cash App RB F1 Team | Test driver | | | | | | |
| 2025 | Super Formula | Team Mugen | 12 | 2 | 3 | 3 | 7 | 124 | **1st** |
| 2025 | Formula One | Oracle Red Bull Racing | Test driver | | | | | | |
| 2025 | Formula One | Visa Cash App Racing Bulls F1 Team | Test and reserve driver | | | | | | |
| 2026 | Super Formula | Team Mugen | 10 | 1 | 3 | 0 | 4 | 89.5 | **2nd*** |
| 2026 | Formula One | Visa Cash App Racing Bulls F1 Team | Test and reserve driver | | | | | | |

^{*} Season still in progress.
‡ Team standings.

=== Complete F4 Japanese Championship results ===
(key) (Races in bold indicate pole position; races in italics indicate points for the fastest lap of top ten finishers)

| Year | Team | 1 | 2 | 3 | 4 | 5 | 6 | 7 | 8 | 9 | 10 | 11 | 12 | 13 | 14 | DC | Points |
|---|---|---|---|---|---|---|---|---|---|---|---|---|---|---|---|---|---|
| 2017 | B-Max Racing Team | OKA; 1 | OKA; 2 | FUJ1; 1 | FUJ1; 2 | AUT; 1 | AUT; 2 | SUG; 1 | SUG; 2 | FUJ2; 1 | FUJ2; 2 | SUZ; 1 | SUZ; 2 | MOT; 1; 15 | MOT; 2; 15 | 28th | 0 |
| 2018 | Rn-sports | OKA; 1 | OKA; 2 | FUJ1; 1 | FUJ1; 2 | SUZ; 1; 6 | SUZ; 2 Ret | FUJ2; 1 | FUJ2; 2 | SUG; 1 | SUG; 2 | AUT; 1 | AUT; 2 | MOT; 1 | MOT; 2 | 17th | 8 |

=== Complete French F4 Championship results ===
(key) (Races in bold indicate pole position) (Races in italics indicate fastest lap)

| Year | 1 | 2 | 3 | 4 | 5 | 6 | 7 | 8 | 9 | 10 | 11 | 12 | 13 | 14 | 15 | 16 | 17 | 18 | 19 | 20 | 21 | Pos | Points |
|---|---|---|---|---|---|---|---|---|---|---|---|---|---|---|---|---|---|---|---|---|---|---|---|
| 2020 | **NOG**; **1**; 1 | NOG; 2; 5 | **NOG**; **3**; 1 | MAG; 1; 4 | MAG; 2; 5 | MAG; 3; 3 | ZAN; 1; 1 | ZAN; 2; 4 | ZAN; 3; 1 | **LEC1**; **1**; 1 | LEC1; 2; 3 | **LEC1**; **3**; 1 | SPA; 1; 1 | SPA; 2; 2 | SPA; 3; 1 | LEC2; 1; 2 | LEC2; 2; 5 | LEC2; 3; 2 | **LEC3**; **1**; 2 | LEC3; 2; 6 | **LEC3**; **3**; 1 | 1st | 338 |

=== Complete F3 Asian Championship results ===
(key) (Races in bold indicate pole position) (Races in italics indicate the fastest lap of top ten finishers)

| Year | Entrant | 1 | 2 | 3 | 4 | 5 | 6 | 7 | 8 | 9 | 10 | 11 | 12 | 13 | 14 | 15 | DC | Points |
|---|---|---|---|---|---|---|---|---|---|---|---|---|---|---|---|---|---|---|
| 2021 | Hitech Grand Prix | DUB; 1; 6 | DUB; 2; 5 | DUB; 3; 5 | ABU; 1; 9 | ABU; 2; 10 | ABU; 3; 4 | ABU; 1; 6 | ABU; 2; 10 | ABU; 3; 7 | DUB; 1; 3 | DUB; 2 Ret | DUB; 3; 10 | ABU; 1; 10 | ABU; 2; 10 | ABU; 3; 7 | 8th | 82 |

=== Complete FIA Formula 3 Championship results ===
(key) (Races in bold indicate pole position; races in italics indicate points for the fastest lap of top ten finishers)

| Year | Entrant | 1 | 2 | 3 | 4 | 5 | 6 | 7 | 8 | 9 | 10 | 11 | 12 | 13 | 14 | 15 | 16 | 17 | 18 | 19 | 20 | 21 | DC | Points |
|---|---|---|---|---|---|---|---|---|---|---|---|---|---|---|---|---|---|---|---|---|---|---|---|---|
| 2021 | Hitech Grand Prix | CAT; 1; 14 | CAT; 2; 7 | CAT; 3; 15 | LEC; 1; 8 | LEC; 2; 9 | LEC; 3; 7 | RBR; 1 DSQ | RBR; 2; 14 | RBR; 3; 6 | HUN; 1; 1 | HUN; 2; 10 | HUN; 3; 12 | SPA; 1; 15 | SPA; 2; 11 | SPA; 3; 13 | ZAN; 1; 3 | ZAN; 2 Ret | ZAN; 3; 11 | SOC; 1; 10 | SOC; 2 C | SOC; 3; 9 | 12th | 52 |

=== Complete FIA Formula 2 Championship results ===
(key) (Races in bold indicate pole position) (Races in italics indicate fastest lap)

| Year | Entrant | 1 | 2 | 3 | 4 | 5 | 6 | 7 | 8 | 9 | 10 | 11 | 12 | 13 | 14 | 15 | 16 | 17 | 18 | 19 | 20 | 21 | 22 | 23 | 24 | 25 | 26 | 27 | 28 | DC | Points |
|---|---|---|---|---|---|---|---|---|---|---|---|---|---|---|---|---|---|---|---|---|---|---|---|---|---|---|---|---|---|---|---|
| 2022 | DAMS | BHR; SPR; 8 | BHR; FEA; 16 | JED; SPR; 6 | JED; FEA; 7 | IMO; SPR; 9 | IMO; FEA; 5 | CAT; SPR; 2 | CAT; FEA; 12 | MCO; SPR; 19 | MCO; FEA; 17† | BAK; SPR; 8 | BAK; FEA; 14 | SIL; SPR; 2 | SIL; FEA; 12 | RBR; SPR; 10 | RBR; FEA; 7 | LEC; SPR; 6 | LEC; FEA; 1 | HUN; SPR; 8 | **HUN**; **FEA**; 3 | SPA; SPR; 9 | SPA; FEA; 7 | ZAN; SPR; 6 | ZAN; FEA; 3 | MNZ; SPR; 16 | MNZ; FEA; DSQ | YMC; SPR; 13 | **YMC**; **FEA**; 1 | 5th | 141 |
| 2023 | DAMS | BHR; SPR; 4 | BHR; FEA; 8 | JED; SPR; 1 | JED; FEA; 4 | MEL; SPR; 13 | **MEL**; **FEA**; 1 | BAK; SPR; Ret | BAK; FEA; 12 | MCO; SPR; 1 | MCO; FEA; 10 | CAT; SPR; 8 | CAT; FEA; 4 | RBR; SPR; 11 | RBR; FEA; 2 | SIL; SPR; 21 | SIL; FEA; 5 | HUN; SPR; 2 | HUN; FEA; 4 | SPA; SPR; 7 | SPA; FEA; Ret | ZAN; SPR; 13 | ZAN; FEA; 13 | MNZ; SPR; Ret | MNZ; FEA; 2 | YMC; SPR; 8 | YMC; FEA; 4 | | | 4th | 165 |

=== Complete Super Formula results ===
(key) (Races in bold indicate pole position) (Races in italics indicate fastest lap)

| Year | Team | Engine | 1 | 2 | 3 | 4 | 5 | 6 | 7 | 8 | 9 | 10 | 11 | 12 | DC | Points |
|---|---|---|---|---|---|---|---|---|---|---|---|---|---|---|---|---|
| 2024 | Team Mugen | Honda | SUZ; 9 | **AUT**; 2^{1} | SUG; 2‡^{2} | FUJ; 11^{2} | MOT; 7 | FUJ; 2 | FUJ; 6 | SUZ; 9^{2} | SUZ; 7 | | | | 5th | 63.5 |
| 2025 | Team Mugen | Honda | SUZ; 2^{2} | SUZ; 3^{2} | MOT; Ret | MOT; 3 | AUT; Ret | FUJ; 3 | FUJ; 2 | **SUG**; 1^{1} | FUJ; 21 | **SUZ**; Ret^{1} | SUZ; 4 | **SUZ**; 1^{1} | 1st | 124 |
| 2026 | Team Mugen | Honda | **MOT**; 2‡^{1} | MOT; 8 | **SUZ**; 13^{1} | SUZ; 2^{2} | FUJ; 10 | **FUJ**; Ret^{1} | FUJ; 5 | SUG; 2 | FUJ; 4 | FUJ; 1^{2} | SUZ | SUZ | 2nd* | 89.5 |

^{‡} Half points awarded as less than 75% of race distance was completed. ^{*} Season still in progress.

=== Complete Formula One participations ===
(key) (Races in bold indicate pole position) (Races in italics indicate fastest lap)

| Year | Entrant | Chassis | Engine | 1 | 2 | 3 | 4 | 5 | 6 | 7 | 8 | 9 | 10 | 11 | 12 | 13 | 14 | 15 | 16 | 17 | 18 | 19 | 20 | 21 | 22 | 23 | 24 | WDC | Points |
|---|---|---|---|---|---|---|---|---|---|---|---|---|---|---|---|---|---|---|---|---|---|---|---|---|---|---|---|---|---|
| 2024 | Visa Cash App RB F1 Team | RB VCARB 01 | Honda RBPTH002 1.6 V6 t | BHR | SAU | AUS | JPN; TD | CHN | MIA | EMI | MON | CAN | ESP | AUT | GBR | HUN | BEL | NED | ITA | AZE | SIN | USA | MXC | SAP | LVG | QAT | ABU; TD | – | – |
| 2025 | Oracle Red Bull Racing | Red Bull RB21 | Honda RBPTH003 1.6 V6 t | AUS | CHN | JPN | BHR; TD | SAU | MIA | EMI | MON | ESP | CAN | AUT | GBR | BEL | HUN | NED | ITA | AZE | SIN | USA | | | | | | – | – |
| 2025 | Visa Cash App Racing Bulls F1 Team | Racing Bulls VCARB 02 | Honda RBPTH003 1.6 V6 t | | | | | | | | | | | | | | | | | | | | MXC; TD | SAP | LVG | QAT | ABU; TD | – | – |
| 2026 | Oracle Red Bull Racing | Red Bull RB22 | Red Bull Ford DM01 1.6 V6 t | AUS | CHN | JPN | MIA | CAN | MON | BCN; TD | | | | | | ITA; TD | ESP | AZE | BHR | SIN | USA | MXC; TD | SAP | LVG | QAT | ABU | | – | – |
| 2026 | Visa Cash App Racing Bulls F1 Team | Racing Bulls VCARB 03 | Red Bull Ford DM01 1.6 V6 t | | | | | | | | AUT; TD | GBR | BEL | HUN | NED | | | | | | | | | | | | | – | – |

== Notes ==
Sporting positions
| Preceded by Hadrien David | French F4 Championship; Champion; 2020 | Succeeded by Esteban Masson |
| Preceded by Inaugural | F3 Asian Championship; Rookie Champion; 2021 | Succeeded by Pepe Martí |
| Preceded by Liam Lawson | Super Formula; Rookie Champion; 2024 | Succeeded by Igor Fraga |
| Preceded by Sho Tsuboi | Super Formula; Champion; 2025 | Succeeded by Incumbent |
Awards
| Preceded by Oscar Piastri | Anthoine Hubert Award; 2022 | Succeeded by Victor Martins |
