= 2023 Silverstone Formula 2 round =

Motor racing event

(United Kingdom) 2023 Silverstone Formula 2 round
Round details
- Round 8 of 13 in the 2023 FIA Formula 2 Championship.
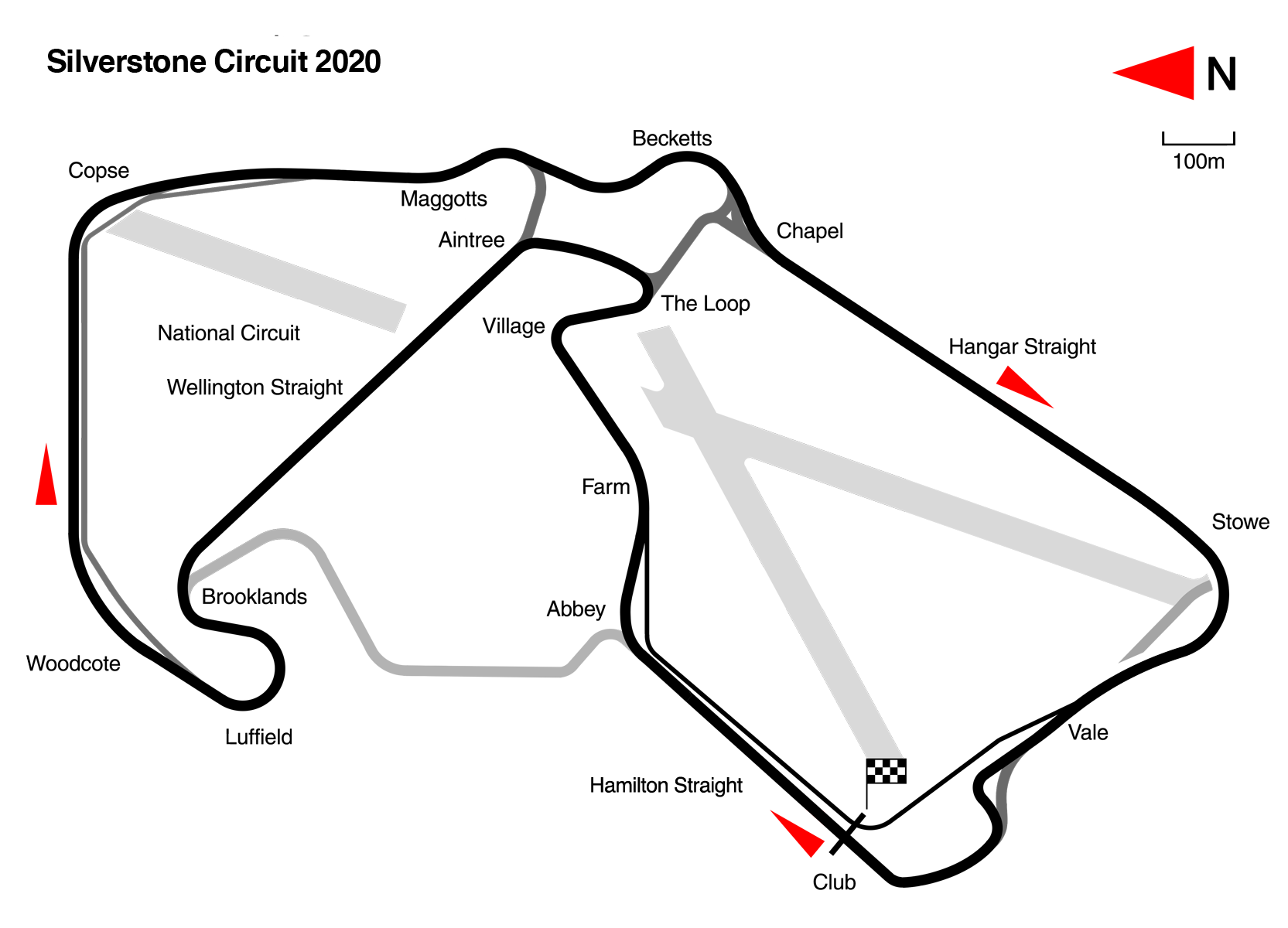
- Location: Silverstone Circuit, Silverstone, United Kingdom
- Course: Permanent racing facility 5.891 km (3.660 mi)

Sprint Race
- Date: 8 July 2023
- Laps: 19
Podium
First	(Denmark) Frederik Vesti	Prema Racing
Second	(France) Théo Pourchaire	ART Grand Prix
Third	(Australia) Jack Doohan	Invicta Virtuosi Racing
Fastest lap
Driver	(Japan) Ayumu Iwasa	DAMS
- Time: 1:59.913 (on lap 17)

Feature Race
- Date: 9 July 2023
- Laps: 29
Pole position
Driver	(France) Victor Martins	ART Grand Prix
Time	1:39:832	
Podium
First	(France) Victor Martins	ART Grand Prix
Second	(Barbados) Zane Maloney	Rodin Carlin
Third	(France) Théo Pourchaire	ART Grand Prix
Fastest lap
Driver	(France) Victor Martins	ART Grand Prix
- Time: 1:42.091 (on lap 23)

The 2023 Silverstone Formula 2 round was a motor racing event held between 7 and 9 July 2023 at the Silverstone Circuit. It was the eighth round of the 2023 Formula 2 Championship and was held in support of the 2023 British Grand Prix.

== Classification ==
=== Qualifying ===
Pos.	No.	Driver	Entrant	Time	Grid SR	Grid FR
1	6	(France) Victor Martins	ART Grand Prix	1:39.832	8	1
2	24	(India) Kush Maini	Campos Racing	+0.113	14^{1}	2
3	11	(Japan) Ayumu Iwasa	DAMS	+0.120	7	3
4	14	(Australia) Jack Doohan	Invicta Virtuosi Racing	+0.125	6	4
5	8	(United Kingdom) Oliver Bearman	Prema Racing	+0.157	5	5
6	4	(Brazil) Enzo Fittipaldi	Rodin Carlin	+0.159	4	6
7	3	(Barbados) Zane Maloney	Rodin Carlin	+0.169	10^{2}	7
8	5	(France) Théo Pourchaire	ART Grand Prix	+0.187	3	8
9	10	(France) Isack Hadjar	Hitech Pulse-Eight	+0.194	2	9
10	7	(Denmark) Frederik Vesti	Prema Racing	+0.220	1	10
11	16	(Israel) Roy Nissany	PHM Racing by Charouz	+0.303	9	11
12	12	(Monaco) Arthur Leclerc	DAMS	+0.366	11	12
13	2	(India) Jehan Daruvala	MP Motorsport	+0.482	12	13
14	1	(Norway) Dennis Hauger	MP Motorsport	+0.536	19^{3}	14
15	9	(United States) Jak Crawford	Hitech Pulse-Eight	+0.568	13	15
16	20	(Czech Republic) Roman Staněk	Trident	+0.694	15	16
17	22	(Netherlands) Richard Verschoor	Van Amersfoort Racing	+0.729	16	17
18	25	(Switzerland) Ralph Boschung	Campos Racing	+0.983	17	18
19	17	(United States) Brad Benavides	PHM Racing by Charouz	+1.118	18	19
20	21	(France) Clément Novalak	Trident	+1.274	20	20
21	15	(Belgium) Amaury Cordeel	Invicta Virtuosi Racing	+1.625	21	21
22	23	(United States) Juan Manuel Correa	Van Amersfoort Racing	+2.252	22	22

Notes

- ^1 - Kush Maini was handed a five-place grid penalty for failing to serve a five-second time penalty for exceeding track limits in the Spielberg feature race.
- ^2 - Zane Maloney received two three-place grid penalties in qualifying; the first for impeding Théo Pourchaire and the second for impeding Jack Doohan.
- ^3 - Dennis Hauger received a five-place grid penalty for failing to abort a push lap during double waved yellow flags.

=== Sprint race ===
Pos.	No.	Driver	Entrant	Laps	Time/Retired	Grid	Points
1	7	(Denmark) Frederik Vesti	Prema Racing	19	40:16.405	1	10
2	5	(France) Théo Pourchaire	ART Grand Prix	19	+13.432	3	8 (1)
3	14	(Australia) Jack Doohan	Invicta Virtuosi Racing	19	+19.422	6	6
4	4	(Brazil) Enzo Fittipaldi	Rodin Carlin	19	+25.610	4	5
5	10	(France) Isack Hadjar	Hitech Pulse-Eight	19	+30.517	2	4
6	8	(United Kingdom) Oliver Bearman	Prema Racing	19	+30.863	5	3
7	6	(France) Victor Martins	ART Grand Prix	19	+31.345	8	2
8	12	(Monaco) Arthur Leclerc	DAMS	19	+31.633	11	1
9	16	(Israel) Roy Nissany	PHM Racing by Charouz	19	+32.452	9	
10	3	(Barbados) Zane Maloney	Rodin Carlin	19	+38.554	10	
11	2	(India) Jehan Daruvala	MP Motorsport	19	+39.880	12	
12	1	(Norway) Dennis Hauger	MP Motorsport	19	+40.251	19	
13	24	(India) Kush Maini	Campos Racing	19	+44.116	14	
14	9	(United States) Jak Crawford	Hitech Pulse-Eight	19	+44.706	13	
15	20	(Czech Republic) Roman Staněk	Trident	19	+48.241	15	
16	15	(Belgium) Amaury Cordeel	Invicta Virtuosi Racing	19	+50.269^{1}	21	
17	21	(France) Clément Novalak	Trident	19	+51.066^{2}	20	
18	22	(Netherlands) Richard Verschoor	Van Amersfoort Racing	19	+52.808	16	
19	23	(United States) Juan Manuel Correa	Van Amersfoort Racing	19	+1:07.916	22	
20	25	(Switzerland) Ralph Boschung	Campos Racing	19	+1:14.160	17	
21	11	(Japan) Ayumu Iwasa	DAMS	18	+1 lap	7	
DNF	17	(United States) Brad Benavides	PHM Racing by Charouz	0	Spun off	18	
Fastest lap set by (Japan) Ayumu Iwasa: 1:59.913 (lap 17)

Notes

- ^1 - Amaury Cordeel originally finished fifteenth, but was given a five-second time penalty for leaving the track while overtaking Clément Novalak, dropping him down to sixteenth.
- ^2 - Clément Novalak received a five-second time penalty for causing a collision with Brad Benavides.

=== Feature race ===
Pos.	No.	Driver	Entrant	Laps	Time/Retired	Grid	Points
1	6	(France) Victor Martins	ART Grand Prix	29	58:54.389^{1}	1	25 (3)
2	3	(Barbados) Zane Maloney	Rodin Carlin	29	+2.051	7	18
3	5	(France) Théo Pourchaire	ART Grand Prix	29	+4.749	8	15
4	14	(Australia) Jack Doohan	Invicta Virtuosi Racing	29	+6.637	4	12
5	11	(Japan) Ayumu Iwasa	DAMS	29	+12.611	3	10
6	2	(India) Jehan Daruvala	MP Motorsport	29	+18.933^{2}	13	8
7	4	(Brazil) Enzo Fittipaldi	Rodin Carlin	29	+18.963	6	6
8	8	(United Kingdom) Oliver Bearman	Prema Racing	29	+23.225^{3}	5	4
9	12	(Monaco) Arthur Leclerc	DAMS	29	+24.155	12	2
10	9	(United States) Jak Crawford	Hitech Pulse-Eight	29	+24.543	15	1
11	23	(United States) Juan Manuel Correa	Van Amersfoort Racing	29	+27.958	22	
12	21	(France) Clément Novalak	Trident	29	+30.610	20	
13	17	(United States) Brad Benavides	PHM Racing by Charouz	29	+30.973	19	
14	1	(Norway) Dennis Hauger	MP Motorsport	29	+32.920	14	
15	10	(France) Isack Hadjar	Hitech Pulse-Eight	29	+34.573	9	
16	22	(Netherlands) Richard Verschoor	Van Amersfoort Racing	29	+34.629^{2}	17	
17	16	(Israel) Roy Nissany	PHM Racing by Charouz	29	+39.777^{2} ^{4}	11	
DNF	25	(Switzerland) Ralph Boschung	Campos Racing	15	Collision	18	
DNF	24	(India) Kush Maini	Campos Racing	15	Collision	2	
DNF	7	(Denmark) Frederik Vesti	Prema Racing	11	Suspension/Collision	10	
DNF	20	(Czech Republic) Roman Staněk	Trident	9	Collision	16	
DNF	15	(Belgium) Amaury Cordeel	Invicta Virtuosi Racing	5	Spun off	21	
Fastest lap set by (France) Victor Martins: 1:42.091 (lap 23)

Notes

- ^1 - Victor Martins received a 5-second time penalty for overtaking Ayumu Iwasa off track.
- ^2 - Jehan Daruvala, Roy Nissany and Richard Verschoor received a 5-second time penalty for speeding in the pit lane.
- ^3 - Oliver Bearman received a 5-second time penalty for causing a collision with Kush Maini.
- ^4 - Roy Nissany received a 10-second time penalty for causing a collision with Frederik Vesti.

== Standings after the event ==
Drivers' Championship standings

	Pos.	Driver	Points
	1	(Denmark) Frederik Vesti	135
	2	(France) Théo Pourchaire	129
	3	(Japan) Ayumu Iwasa	111
	4	(United Kingdom) Oliver Bearman	88
2	5	(France) Victor Martins	88

Teams' Championship standings

Pos.	Team	Points
1	(Italy) Prema Racing	223
2	(France) ART Grand Prix	217
3	(France) DAMS	150
4	(United Kingdom) Rodin Carlin	134
5	(Netherlands) MP Motorsport	109

- Note: Only the top five positions are included for both sets of standings.

== See also ==
- 2023 British Grand Prix
- 2023 Silverstone Formula 3 round

Previous round: 2023 Spielberg Formula 2 round	FIA Formula 2 Championship; 2023 season	Next round: 2023 Budapest Formula 2 round
Previous round: 2022 Silverstone Formula 2 round	Silverstone Formula 2 round	Next round: 2024 Silverstone Formula 2 round
