= 2023 Barcelona Formula 2 round =

Motor racing event

(Spain) 2023 Barcelona Formula 2 round
Round details
- Round 6 of 13 in the 2023 FIA Formula 2 Championship.
- Location: Circuit de Barcelona-Catalunya, Montmeló, Catalonia, Spain
- Course: Permanent racing facility 4.657 km (2.894 mi)

Sprint Race
- Date: 3 June 2023
- Laps: 26
Podium
First	(Denmark) Frederik Vesti	Prema Racing
Second	(France) Théo Pourchaire	ART Grand Prix
Third	(France) Victor Martins	ART Grand Prix
Fastest lap
Driver	(France) Théo Pourchaire	ART Grand Prix
- Time: 1:28.422 (on lap 26)

Feature Race
- Date: 4 June 2023
- Laps: 37
Pole position
Driver	(United Kingdom) Oliver Bearman	Prema Racing
Time	1:23.546	
Podium
First	(United Kingdom) Oliver Bearman	Prema Racing
Second	(Brazil) Enzo Fittipaldi	Rodin Carlin
Third	(France) Victor Martins	ART Grand Prix
Fastest lap
Driver	(France) Clément Novalak	Trident
- Time: 1:27.474 (on lap 35)

The 2023 Barcelona Formula 2 round was a motor racing event held between 2 and 4 June 2023 at the Circuit de Barcelona-Catalunya. It was the sixth round of the 2023 Formula 2 Championship and was held in support of the 2023 Spanish Grand Prix.

== Classification ==
=== Qualifying ===
Pos.	No.	Driver	Entrant	Time	Grid SR	Grid FR
1	8	(United Kingdom) Oliver Bearman	Prema Racing	1:23.546	10	1
2	4	(Brazil) Enzo Fittipaldi	Rodin Carlin	+0.077	8	2
3	14	(Australia) Jack Doohan	Invicta Virtuosi Racing	+0.110	7	3
4	11	(Japan) Ayumu Iwasa	DAMS	+0.193	6	4
5	5	(France) Théo Pourchaire	ART Grand Prix	+0.193	9^{1}	5
6	1	(Norway) Dennis Hauger	MP Motorsport	+0.377	5	6
7	6	(France) Victor Martins	ART Grand Prix	+0.432	4	7
8	7	(Denmark) Frederik Vesti	Prema Racing	+0.463	3	8
9	9	(United States) Jak Crawford	Hitech Pulse-Eight	+0.523	2	9
10	15	(Belgium) Amaury Cordeel	Invicta Virtuosi Racing	+0.541	1	10
11	23	(United States) Juan Manuel Correa	Van Amersfoort Racing	+0.560	11	14
12	22	(Netherlands) Richard Verschoor	Van Amersfoort Racing	+0.564	12	11
13	12	(Monaco) Arthur Leclerc	DAMS	+0.682	13	12
14	24	(India) Kush Maini	Campos Racing	+0.698	14	13
15	2	(India) Jehan Daruvala	MP Motorsport	+0.710	15	15
16	16	(Israel) Roy Nissany	PHM Racing by Charouz	+0.810	16	21
17	25	(Switzerland) Ralph Boschung	Campos Racing	+0.951	17	16
18	20	(Czech Republic) Roman Staněk	Trident	+0.954	18	17
19	21	(France) Clément Novalak	Trident	+0.986	19	18
20	10	(France) Isack Hadjar	Hitech Pulse-Eight	+1.020	20	19
21	3	(Barbados) Zane Maloney	Rodin Carlin	+1.115	21	20
22	17	(United States) Brad Benavides	PHM Racing by Charouz	+1.257	22	22
107% time: 1:29.394

Notes

- ^1 – Théo Pourchaire has been handed a three-place grid drop for the Sprint Race for impeding Dennis Hauger during Qualifying.

=== Sprint race ===
Pos.	No.	Driver	Entrant	Laps	Time/Retired	Grid	Points
1	7	(Denmark) Frederik Vesti	Prema Racing	26	47:22.796	3	10
2	5	(France) Théo Pourchaire	ART Grand Prix	26	+1.104	9	8 (1)
3	6	(France) Victor Martins	ART Grand Prix	26	+4.626	4	6
4	1	(Norway) Dennis Hauger	MP Motorsport	26	+5.184	5	5
5	14	(Australia) Jack Doohan	Invicta Virtuosi Racing	26	+5.661	7	4
6	22	(Netherlands) Richard Verschoor	Van Amersfoort Racing	26	+7.020	12	3
7	8	(United Kingdom) Oliver Bearman	Prema Racing	26	+7.486	10	2
8	11	(Japan) Ayumu Iwasa	DAMS	26	+9.864	6	1
9	12	(Monaco) Arthur Leclerc	DAMS	26	+10.215	13	
10	4	(Brazil) Enzo Fittipaldi	Rodin Carlin	26	+12.387	8	
11	21	(France) Clément Novalak	Trident	26	+12.821	19	
12	10	(France) Isack Hadjar	Hitech Pulse-Eight	26	+13.951	20	
13	20	(Czech Republic) Roman Staněk	Trident	26	+14.329	18	
14	3	(Barbados) Zane Maloney	Rodin Carlin	26	+16.056	21	
15	17	(United States) Brad Benavides	PHM Racing by Charouz	26	+16.922	22	
16	25	(Switzerland) Ralph Boschung	Campos Racing	26	+20.832	17	
17	15	(Belgium) Amaury Cordeel	Invicta Virtuosi Racing	26	+24.657^{1}	1	
18	24	(India) Kush Maini	Campos Racing	26	+1:00.844	14	
19^{2}	2	(India) Jehan Daruvala	MP Motorsport	25	Collision	15	
20^{2}	16	(Israel) Roy Nissany	PHM Racing by Charouz	25	Collision	16	
DNF	23	(United States) Juan Manuel Correa	Van Amersfoort Racing	18	Spun off	11	
DNF	9	(United States) Jak Crawford	Hitech Pulse-Eight	1	Collision damage	2	
Fastest lap set by (France) Théo Pourchaire: 1:28.422 (lap 26)

Notes

- ^1 – Amaury Cordeel originally finished eighth, but was given a five-second time-penalty for track limit violations. As a consequence, Ayumu Iwasa inherited the final points position. He then received another ten-second time-penalty for failing to serve the time penalty during his pitstop.
- ^2 – Jehan Daruvala and Roy Nissany both collided on the final lap, but were classified as they completed over 90% of the race distance. Even though Nissany rejoined the race, he failed to complete the full race distance as he entered the pits at the end of the final lap.

=== Feature race ===
Pos.	No.	Driver	Entrant	Laps	Time/Retired	Grid	Points
1	8	(United Kingdom) Oliver Bearman	Prema Racing	37	56:56.729	1	25 (2)
2	4	(Brazil) Enzo Fittipaldi	Rodin Carlin	37	+2.844	2	18
3	6	(France) Victor Martins	ART Grand Prix	37	+3.478	7	15
4	11	(Japan) Ayumu Iwasa	DAMS	37	+9.023	4	12
5	7	(Denmark) Frederik Vesti	Prema Racing	37	+9.615	8	10 (1)
6	14	(Australia) Jack Doohan	Invicta Virtuosi Racing	37	+17.091	3	8
7	5	(France) Théo Pourchaire	ART Grand Prix	37	+20.415	5	6
8	1	(Norway) Dennis Hauger	MP Motorsport	37	+21.283	6	4
9	12	(Monaco) Arthur Leclerc	DAMS	37	+21.883	12	2
10	22	(Netherlands) Richard Verschoor	Van Amersfoort Racing	37	+34.613	11	1
11	23	(United States) Juan Manuel Correa	Van Amersfoort Racing	37	+42.034	14^{1}	
12	20	(Czech Republic) Roman Staněk	Trident	37	+42.887	17	
13	9	(United States) Jak Crawford	Hitech Pulse-Eight	37	+43.492^{3}	9	
14	2	(India) Jehan Daruvala	MP Motorsport	37	+45.553	15	
15	25	(Switzerland) Ralph Boschung	Campos Racing	37	+58.287	16	
16	3	(Barbados) Zane Maloney	Rodin Carlin	37	+1:00.653	20	
17	24	(India) Kush Maini	Campos Racing	37	+1:02.686	17	
18	16	(Israel) Roy Nissany	PHM Racing by Charouz	37	+1:04.283	21^{2}	
19	15	(Belgium) Amaury Cordeel	Invicta Virtuosi Racing	37	+1:21.096^{4}	10	
20	10	(France) Isack Hadjar	Hitech Pulse-Eight	36	+1 lap	19	
21	21	(France) Clément Novalak	Trident	36	+1 lap	18	
22	17	(United States) Brad Benavides	PHM Racing by Charouz	36	+1 lap^{5}	22	
Fastest lap set by (France) Clément Novalak: 1:27.474 (lap 35)

Notes

- ^1 – Juan Manuel Correa received a three-place grid drop for causing a collision with Roman Staněk in the Sprint Race.
- ^2 – Roy Nissany received a five-place grid drop for causing a collision with Jehan Daruvala in the Sprint Race.
- ^3 – Jak Crawford originally finished eleventh, but was given a five-second time penalty for track limits violations.
- ^4 – Amaury Cordeel was given a five-second time penalty for speeding in the pitlane.
- ^5 – Brad Benavides was given a 45-second time penalty for track limits violations and a 20-second time penalty for failing to serve the penalty correctly.

== Standings after the event ==
Drivers' Championship standings

	Pos.	Driver	Points
	1	(Denmark) Frederik Vesti	110
	2	(France) Théo Pourchaire	99
	3	(Japan) Ayumu Iwasa	82
3	4	(United Kingdom) Oliver Bearman	70
	5	(Norway) Dennis Hauger	57

Teams' Championship standings

	Pos.	Team	Points
	1	(Italy) Prema Racing	180
	2	(France) ART Grand Prix	144
	3	(France) DAMS	118
	4	(Netherlands) MP Motorsport	97
1	5	(United Kingdom) Rodin Carlin	97

- Note: Only the top five positions are included for both sets of standings.

== See also ==
- 2023 Spanish Grand Prix
- 2023 Barcelona Formula 3 round

Previous round: 2023 Monte Carlo Formula 2 round	FIA Formula 2 Championship; 2023 season	Next round: 2023 Spielberg Formula 2 round
Previous round: 2022 Barcelona Formula 2 round	Barcelona Formula 2 round	Next round: 2024 Barcelona Formula 2 round
