= 2017 French F4 Championship =

French motorsport season

The 2017 French F4 Championship season was the 25th season of the series for 1600cc Formula Renault machinery, and the seventh season to run under the guise of the French F4 Championship. The series began on 16 April at Nogaro and ended on 15 October at Le Castellet, after seven rounds and twenty one races.

Arthur Rougier clinched the titles in the general classification of the championship and in the International Series, winning races at Pau and Spa Victor Martins won races at Nogaro, Monza and Le Castellet but lost to Rougier in general classification just by four points, while in the Junior Championship he took the title. Florian Venturi wasn't able to win a race but he scored seven podiums and completed the season in the top-three of the drivers' standings. Pierre-Alexandre Jean, Jean-Baptiste Mela, Charles Milesi, Stuart White, Hugo Chevalier, Marvin Klein, Javier González, Thomas Drouet and Pierre-Louis Chovet were the other race winners.

== Driver lineup ==
No.	Driver	Class	Rounds
1	(Denmark) Casper Røes Andersen	I	1–4
2	(France) Hugo Chevalier	I	All
3	(South Africa) Stuart White	J	All
4	(France) Jean-Baptiste Mela	I	All
5	(France) Pierre-Alexandre Jean	I	All
6	(France) Charles Milesi	I	All
7	(France) Thomas Drouet	I	All
8	(Mexico) Javier González	I	1–6
9	(Denmark) Noah Watt	J	5–7
10	(France) Pierre-Louis Chovet	J	5–7
11	(Belgium) Amaury Cordeel	J	All
12	(France) Antoine Horemans	I	4
13	(France) Marvin Klein	I	All
15	(France) Adam Eteki	J	6
27	(Belgium) Ugo de Wilde	J	All
29	(France) Victor Martins	J	All
49	(France) Florian Venturi	I	All
51	(Italy) Aldo Festante	I	1–4
87	(France) Arthur Rougier	I	All
92	(Colombia) Christian Muñoz	I	All

Icon	Status
I	Drivers that compete for the International Championship
J	Drivers that compete for the Junior Championship
G	Guest drivers that are ineligible to score points

== Race calendar and results ==
A seven-round calendar was revealed on 25 January 2017.

Round		Circuit	Date	Pole Position	Fastest Lap	Winning Driver	Junior Winner	International Winner
1	R1	(France) Circuit Paul Armagnac, Nogaro	16 April	(France) Victor Martins	(France) Victor Martins	(France) Victor Martins	(France) Victor Martins	(France) Pierre-Alexandre Jean
1	R2	(France) Circuit Paul Armagnac, Nogaro	16 April		(France) Victor Martins	(Mexico) Javier González	(France) Victor Martins	(Mexico) Javier González
1	R3	(France) Circuit Paul Armagnac, Nogaro	17 April	(France) Victor Martins	(France) Victor Martins	(France) Victor Martins	(France) Victor Martins	(France) Pierre-Alexandre Jean
2	R1	(Italy) Autodromo Nazionale Monza, Monza	29 April	(France) Victor Martins	(France) Victor Martins	(France) Victor Martins	(France) Victor Martins	(France) Florian Venturi
2	R2	(Italy) Autodromo Nazionale Monza, Monza	29 April		(Denmark) Casper Røes Andersen	(France) Pierre-Alexandre Jean	(France) Victor Martins	(France) Pierre-Alexandre Jean
2	R3	(Italy) Autodromo Nazionale Monza, Monza	30 April	(France) Victor Martins	(France) Victor Martins	(France) Charles Milesi	(South Africa) Stuart White	(France) Charles Milesi
3	R1	(France) Circuit de Pau, Pau	20 May	(France) Arthur Rougier	(France) Victor Martins	(France) Arthur Rougier	(France) Victor Martins	(France) Arthur Rougier
3	R2	(France) Circuit de Pau, Pau	20 May		(Italy) Aldo Festante	(France) Thomas Drouet	(South Africa) Stuart White	(France) Thomas Drouet
3	R3	(France) Circuit de Pau, Pau	21 May	(France) Arthur Rougier	(South Africa) Stuart White	(France) Arthur Rougier	(South Africa) Stuart White	(France) Arthur Rougier
4	R1	(Belgium) Circuit de Spa-Francorchamps, Spa	10 June	(France) Arthur Rougier	(Mexico) Javier González	(France) Arthur Rougier	(France) Victor Martins	(France) Arthur Rougier
4	R2	(Belgium) Circuit de Spa-Francorchamps, Spa	11 June		(France) Arthur Rougier	(France) Arthur Rougier	(France) Victor Martins	(France) Arthur Rougier
4	R3	(Belgium) Circuit de Spa-Francorchamps, Spa	11 June	(France) Arthur Rougier	(France) Florian Venturi	(France) Arthur Rougier	(France) Victor Martins	(France) Arthur Rougier
5	R1	(France) Circuit de Nevers Magny-Cours, Magny-Cours	9 September	(France) Victor Martins	(France) Marvin Klein	(France) Marvin Klein	(France) Victor Martins	(France) Marvin Klein
5	R2	(France) Circuit de Nevers Magny-Cours, Magny-Cours	10 September		(France) Victor Martins	(South Africa) Stuart White	(South Africa) Stuart White	(France) Charles Milesi
5	R3	(France) Circuit de Nevers Magny-Cours, Magny-Cours	10 September	(South Africa) Stuart White	(France) Charles Milesi	(France) Charles Milesi	(France) Victor Martins	(France) Charles Milesi
6	R1	(Spain) Circuit de Barcelona-Catalunya, Montmeló	30 September	(France) Victor Martins (Note: Charles Milesi took pole and set the fastest lap, but he was ineligible to score points for them at Barcelona.)	(France) Florian Venturi	(France) Charles Milesi	(France) Victor Martins	(France) Charles Milesi
6	R2	(Spain) Circuit de Barcelona-Catalunya, Montmeló	30 September		(Belgium) Ugo de Wilde	(France) Jean-Baptiste Mela	(Belgium) Ugo de Wilde	(France) Jean-Baptiste Mela
6	R3	(Spain) Circuit de Barcelona-Catalunya, Montmeló	1 October	(France) Victor Martins	(France) Victor Martins	(France) Charles Milesi	(France) Victor Martins	(France) Charles Milesi
7	R1	(France) Circuit Paul Ricard, Le Castellet	14 October	(France) Victor Martins (Note: Hugo Chevalier took pole, but he was ineligible to score points for pole at Le castellet.)	(France) Victor Martins	(France) Hugo Chevalier	(Belgium) Ugo de Wilde	(France) Hugo Chevalier
7	R2	(France) Circuit Paul Ricard, Le Castellet	15 October		(France) Arthur Rougier	(France) Pierre-Louis Chovet	(France) Pierre-Louis Chovet	(France) Jean-Baptiste Mela
7	R3	(France) Circuit Paul Ricard, Le Castellet	15 October	(France) Victor Martins	(France) Victor Martins	(France) Victor Martins	(France) Victor Martins	(France) Arthur Rougier

== Championship standings ==
Points system

Points are awarded as follows:

Races	Position											
Races	1st	2nd	3rd	4th	5th	6th	7th	8th	9th	10th	PP	FL
Races 1 & 3	25	18	15	12	10	8	6	4	2	1	1	1
Race 2	15	12	10	8	6	4	2	1	0	0	0	1

=== French F4 Championship ===
Pos	Driver	NOG (France)			MNZ (Italy)			PAU (France)			SPA (Belgium)			MAG (France)			CAT (Spain)			LEC (France)			Points
1	(France) Arthur Rougier	3	5	7	5	2	2	1	7	1	1	1	1	4	6	5	8	2	7	2	3	2	303
2	(France) Victor Martins	1	11	1	1	4	EX	2	8	16	4	2	2	2	13	2	2	4	2	7	5	1	299
3	(France) Florian Venturi	Ret	8	3	2	3	Ret	Ret	14	5	11	3	4	10	5	7	3	7	3	3	6	14	156
4	(France) Pierre-Alexandre Jean	2	7	2	4	1	14	Ret	11	4	2	4	9	13	8	8	11	14	13	5	4	5	150
5	(France) Jean-Baptiste Mela	6	4	12	8	11	5	7	2	15	5	Ret	6	8	7	9	10	1	Ret	10	2	7	124
6	(Colombia) Christian Muñoz	7	6	8	3	7	13	6	4	6	6	Ret	5	6	6	6	6	Ret	7	14	12	10	122
7	(France) Charles Milesi (Note: Ineligible for points at Barcelona and Le Castellet because he already raced on these circuits during the 2017.)	4	3	4	Ret	8	1	11	10	8	DNS	DNS	DNS	3	2	1	1	6	1	6	8	12	118
8	(South Africa) Stuart White	12	12	14	6	6	3	4	6	3	9	Ret	7	7	1	3	12	10	10	13	13	11	118
9	(France) Hugo Chevalier (Note: Ineligible for points at Le Castellet because he already raced on this circuit during the 2017.)	8	2	13	Ret	14	10	Ret	13	2	7	7	Ret	5	3	4	5	5	4	1	9	6	111
10	(France) Marvin Klein	5	9	5	9	5	4	3	9	14	14	Ret	14	1	14	10	13	9	15	12	11	9	98
11	(Mexico) Javier González (Note: Ineligible for points at Barcelona because he already raced on this circuit during the 2017.)	9	1	10	10	9	11	8	3	9	3	5	3	16	12	14	4	Ret	6				72
12	(Belgium) Ugo de Wilde	13	14	15	13	13	12	12	12	12	12	8	12	12	10	13	7	3	5	4	7	3	68
13	(Denmark) Casper Røes Andersen	10	13	6	7	10	6	5	5	7	8	6	8										58
14	(France) Thomas Drouet	11	10	11	11	Ret	8	10	1	10	10	Ret	10	9	9	12	9	Ret	Ret	9	10	Ret	41
15	(Italy) Aldo Festante	14	15	9	14	12	7	9	15	11	13	9	11										11
16	(Belgium) Amaury Cordeel	Ret	16	Ret	12	Ret	9	Ret	Ret	13	15	11	13	14	15	15	16	13	14	15	Ret	13	6
17	(France) Antoine Horemans										16	10	15										0
Guest drivers ineligible for championship points
	(France) Pierre-Louis Chovet													15	DSQ	EX	17	11	9	8	1	8	0
	(Denmark) Noah Watt													11	11	11	14	8	12	11	Ret	6	0
	(France) Adam Eteki																15	12	17				0
