= Stuart White (racing driver) =

South African racing driver (born 2001)

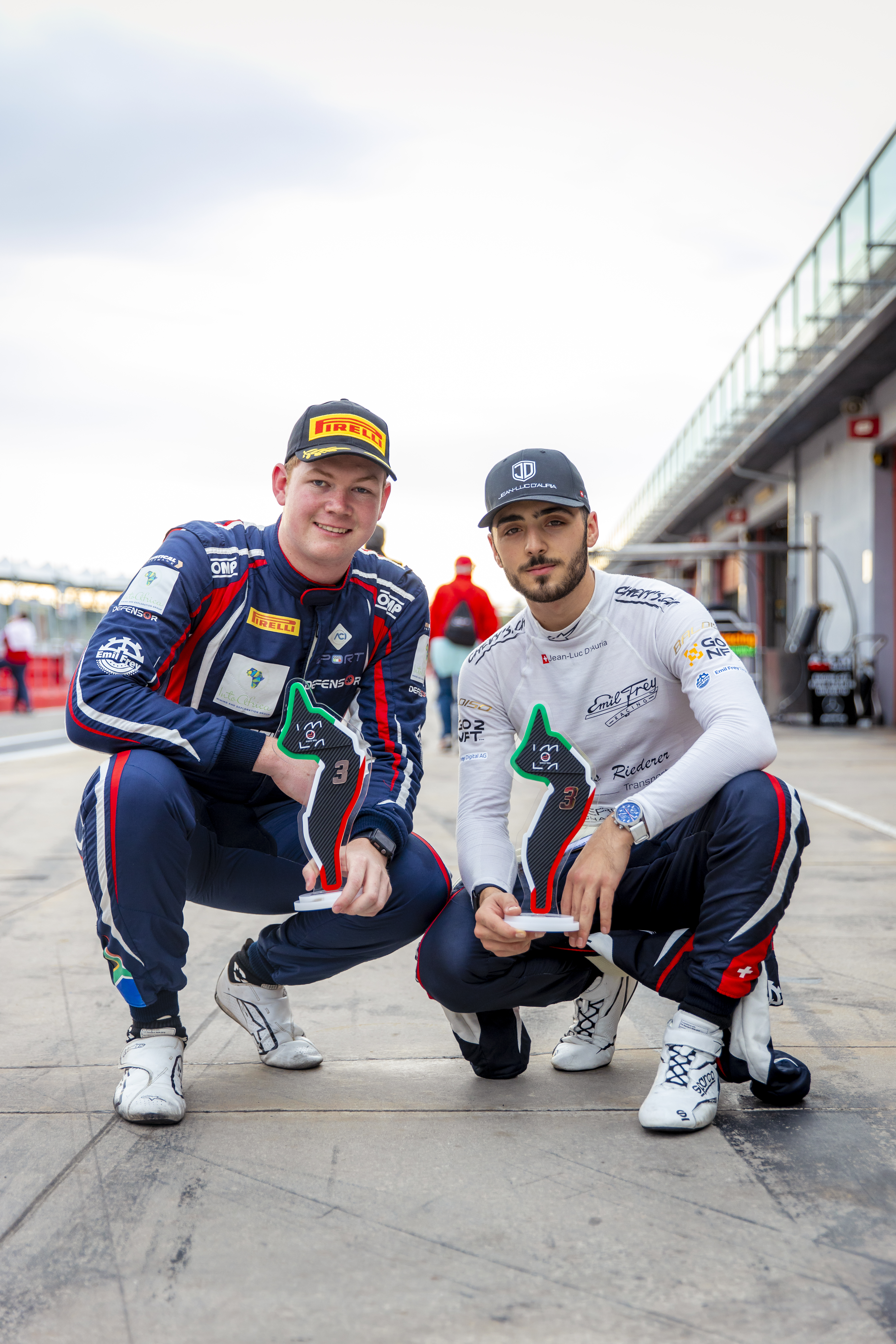
- White (left) in 2023
- Nationality: (South Africa) South African
- Born: Stuart Peter White; 30 September 2001 (age 25) Bloemfontein, South Africa
- Categorisation: FIA Silver

Championship titles
- 2024–2025 2018: South African Endurance Series; South African Formula 1600 Championship

Stuart Peter White (born 30 September 2001) is a South African racing driver who last competed in International GT Open for Into Africa Racing by Dragon.

== Career ==
White began karting in 2006, competing until 2016. Primarily racing in South Africa in his youth, he won the South African Karting Championship in Mini Rok and Maxterino 60cc in 2013, and the Junior Rok title in 2015. Internationally, White most notably finished second in the Junior class of the 2015 ROK Cup International Final, before finishing third in the following year's edition.

After making his single-seater debut in the South African National Formula 1600 Championship in 2016, White remained in the series full-time for the following year, as well as racing in the French F4 Championship. In the former, White scored three wins en route to runner-up honors in points, whereas in the latter, he took a lone win at Magny-Cours and three other podiums to end the year eighth in points.

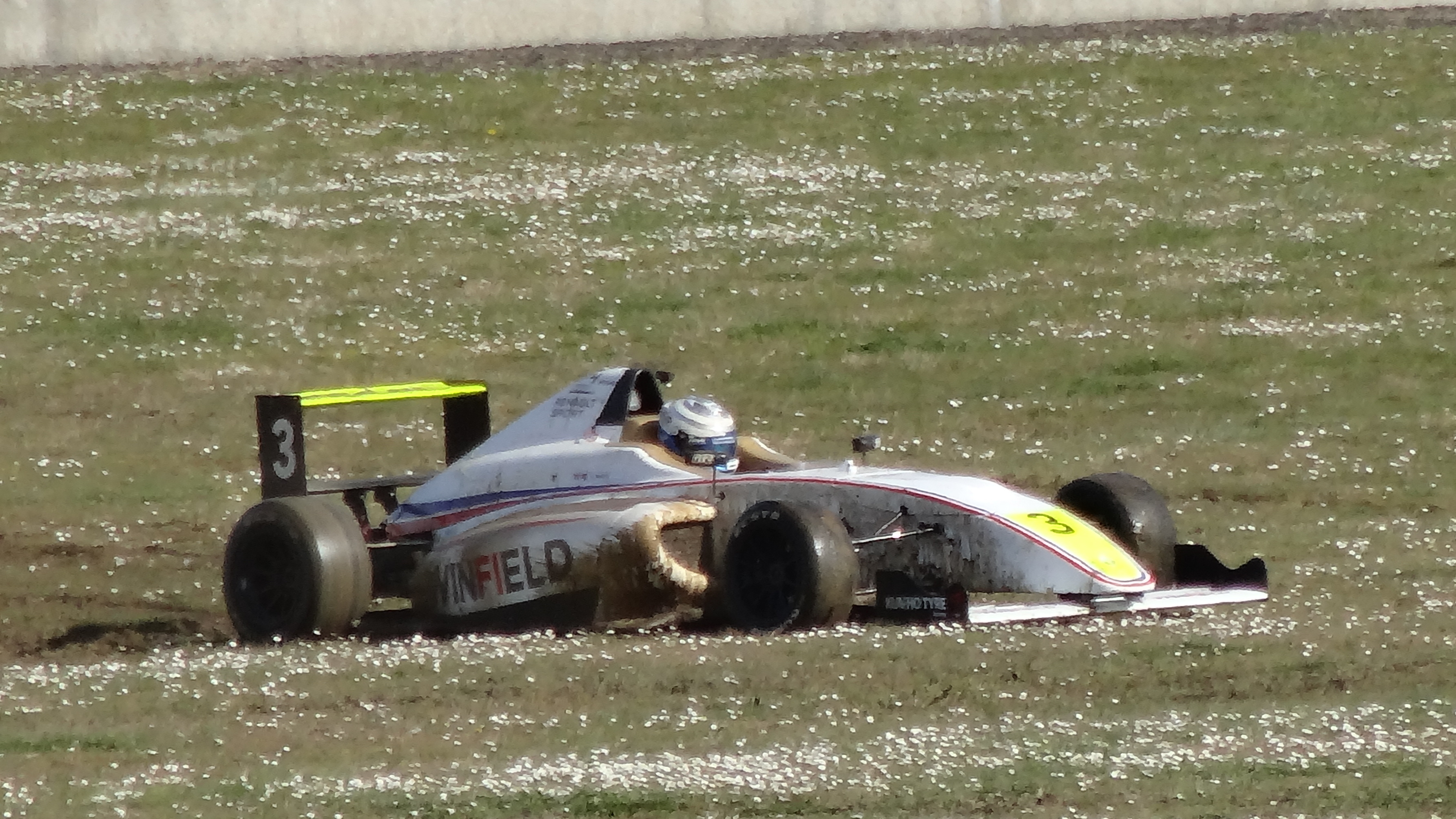
White's stricken F4 car at the 2018 Coupes des Pâques at Nogaro.

Continuing in the South African Formula 1600 Championship for 2018, White scored eight wins and seven further podiums to clinch the series title at the end of the year, earning him an invite to the Mazda Road to Indy Shootout at the end of the year. During 2018, White also returned to the French F4 Championship, competing in the first three rounds and taking a win in race three at Spa. Returning to the latter for 2019 with support from Sauber Motorsport, White took four podiums, with a best result of second in race one at Spa, as he ended his tenure in single-seaters with a ninth-place points finish.

Following a year on the sidelines, White joined Bentley-fielding CMR for his debut in sportscar competition in the GT World Challenge Europe Endurance Cup. After scoring a best overall result of 28th at the Nürburgring, White returned to the series with Emil Frey Racing in 2022, as a member of Lamborghini's GT3 Junior Driver Programme. In his sophomore season in the series, White scored a Silver Cup win at the Hockenheimring and two other class podiums to secure a third-place points finish in class.

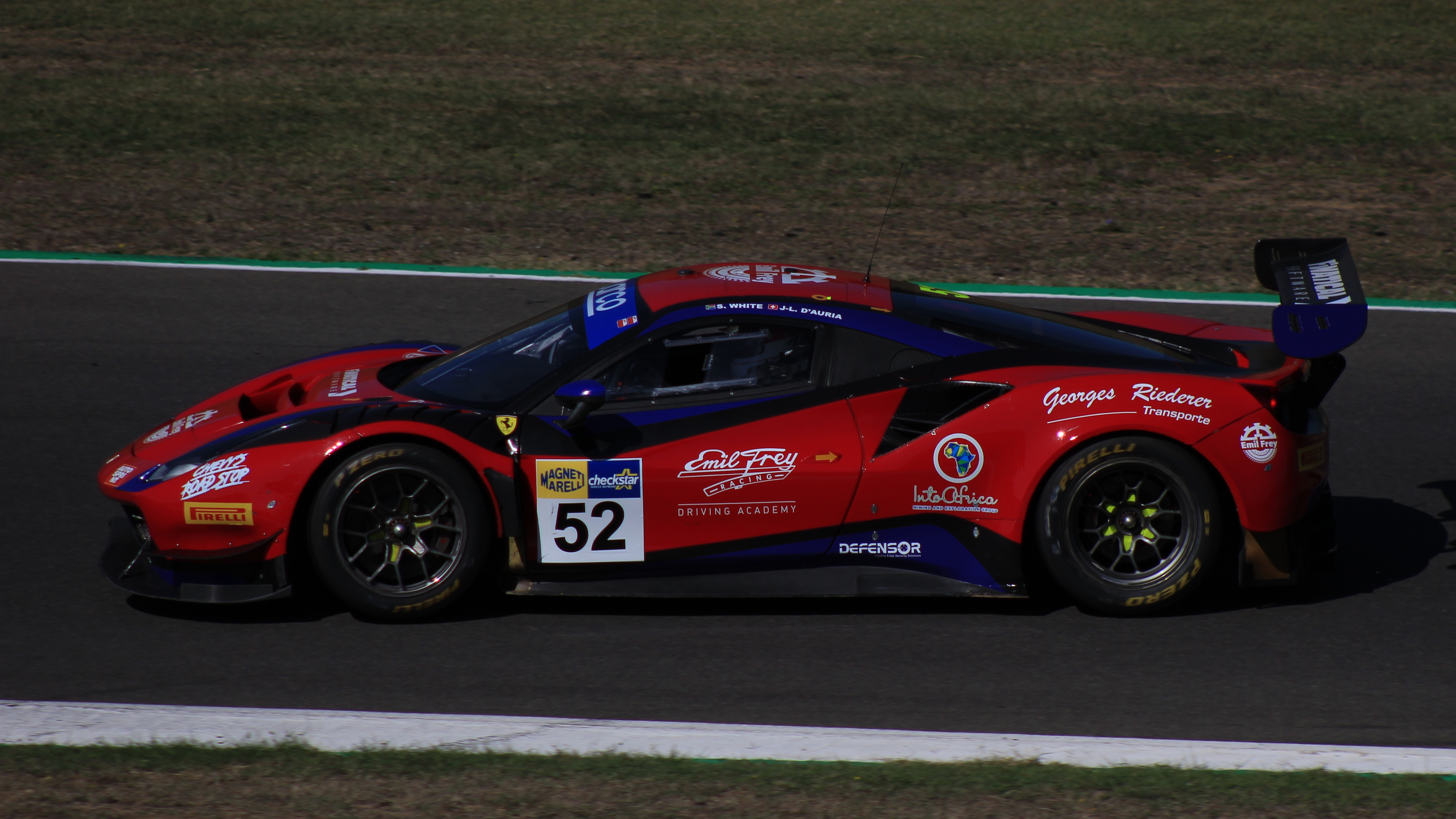
White racing his AF Corse Ferrari at Mugello in 2023.

In 2023, White joined Ferrari-affiliated AF Corse alongside Jean-Luc D'Auria to race in the Italian GT Sprint Championship, in which he scored a lone win at Misano to finish the season fourth in the GT3 standings. In parallel, White also raced in the South African Endurance Series for Into Africa Racing, winning two out of the five races but lost out on the title after retiring at the 9 Hours of Kyalami. The following year, White returned to the latter series with the same team, winning at Kyalami to secure his first series title. Continuing in the series for 2025, White won four of the six races to clinch his second consecutive series title. During 2025, White also raced for the team in one-off races in Creventic-organized series, before remaining with the team to race in the final two rounds of the 2025–26 24H Series Middle East. In those two races, White scored a best result of third overall at the 2026 6 Hours of Abu Dhabi.

For 2026, White remained with Into Africa Racing by Dragon to race in select races of the International GT Open season, as well as the majority of the Italian GT Championship Endurance Cup.

== Karting record ==
=== Karting career summary ===
Season	Series	Team	Position
2010	South African National Rotax Max Challenge Karting Championship — Maxterino		31st
2012	ROK Cup International Final — Mini Rok		13th
2013	ROK Cup International Final — Mini Rok		8th
2014	IAME International Final — X30 Junior		NC
2014	ROK Cup International Final — Junior Rok	Terry Moss Racing	18th
2015	WSK Super Master Series — KF-Junior	David White	77th
2015	Andrea Margutti Trophy — KF-Junior	RKT Karting	22nd
2015	X30 Challenge Europa – Junior	David White	6th
2015	Karting Academy Trophy	David White	7th
2015	ROK Cup International Final — Junior Rok		2nd
2016	WSK Super Master Series — OK-Junior	RKT Racing	65th
2016	Andrea Margutti Trophy — OK-Junior	RKT Racing	26th
2016	Karting World Championship — OK-Junior	RKT Racing	NC
2016	ROK Cup International Final — Junior Rok	RKT Racing	3rd

== Racing record ==
=== Racing career summary ===
Season	Series	Team	Races	Wins	Poles	F/Laps	Podiums	Points	Position
2016	South African National Formula 1600 Championship							21	8th
2017	South African National Formula 1600 Championship		16	3	3	0	11	104	**2nd**
2017	French F4 Championship	FFSA Academy	21	1	1	1	4	118	8th
2018	South African National Formula 1600 Championship		18	8	4	0	15	138	**1st**
2018	French F4 Championship	FFSA Academy	9	1	0	1	1	72	10th
2019	French F4 Championship	FFSA Academy	21	0	2	0	4	97	9th
2021	GT World Challenge Europe Endurance Cup	CMR	5	0	0	0	0	0	NC
2021	GT World Challenge Europe Endurance Cup – Pro-Am	CMR	2	0	0	0	0	4	34th
2021	GT World Challenge Europe Endurance Cup – Silver	CMR	3	0	0	0	0	8	29th
2022	GT World Challenge Europe Endurance Cup	Emil Frey Racing	5	0	0	0	0	6	31st
2022	GT World Challenge Europe Endurance Cup – Silver	Emil Frey Racing	5	1	0	0	3	73	**3rd**
2023	Italian GT Sprint Championship – GT3	AF Corse	8	1	0	0	2	64	4th
2023	South African Endurance Series	Into Africa Racing	5	2	0	0	3	143	**2nd**
2024	South African Endurance Series	Into Africa Racing	5	1	0	0	4	131	**1st**
2025	Middle East Trophy – GT3 Pro-Am	Into Africa Racing by Dragon Racing	1	0	0	0	0	6	NC
2025	24H Series – GT3	Into Africa Racing by Dragon Racing	1	0	0	0	0	4	NC
2025	International GT Open	Into Africa Racing by Dragon Racing	2	0	0	0	0	0	72nd
2025	International GT Open – Pro-Am	Into Africa Racing by Dragon Racing	2	0	0	0	0	0	36th
2025	South African Endurance Series	Into Africa Racing	6	4	0	0	6	341	**1st**
2025	McLaren Trophy Europe – Pro-Am	Greystone GT	1	0	0	0	0	0	NC
2025	Gulf 12 Hours	Into Africa Racing by HAAS RT	1	0	0	0	0	—N/a	13th
2025–26	24H Series Middle East – GT3	Into Africa Racing by Dragon	2	0	0	0	1	32	13th
2026	International GT Open	Into Africa Racing by Dragon	2	0	0	0	0	0	64th
2026	International GT Open – Pro-Am	Into Africa Racing by Dragon	2	0	0	0	0	0	24th
2026	Italian GT Championship Endurance Cup – GT3	Into Africa Racing by Dragon	3	0	0	0	0	5	23rd

=== Complete French F4 Championship results ===
(key) (Races in bold indicate pole position) (Races in italics indicate fastest lap)

Year	1	2	3	4	5	6	7	8	9	10	11	12	13	14	15	16	17	18	19	20	21	Pos	Points
2017	NOG; 1; 12	NOG; 2; 12	NOG; 3; 14	MNZ; 1; 6	MNZ; 2; 6	MNZ; 3; 3	PAU; 1; 4	PAU; 2; 6	PAU; 3; 3	SPA; 1; 9	SPA; 2 Ret	SPA; 3; 7	MAG; 1; 7	MAG; 2; 1	**MAG**; **3**; 3	CAT; 1; 12	CAT; 2; 10	CAT; 3; 10	LEC; 1; 13	LEC; 2; 13	LEC; 3; 11	8th	118
2018	NOG; 1; 11	NOG; 2 Ret	NOG; 3; 7	PAU; 1; 6	PAU; 2; 5	PAU; 3; 5	SPA; 1; 4	SPA; 2; 4	SPA; 3; 1	DIJ; 1	DIJ; 2	DIJ; 3	MAG; 1	MAG; 2	MAG; 3	JER; 1	JER; 2	JER; 3	LEC; 1	LEC; 2	LEC; 3	10th	72
2019	NOG; 1; 6	NOG; 2; 7	NOG; 3; 7	**PAU**; **1**; 3	PAU; 2; 5	**PAU**; **3**; 3	SPA; 1; 2	SPA; 2; 8	SPA; 3; 11	LÉD; 1; 8	LÉD; 2; 3	LÉD; 3; 7	HUN; 1; 11	HUN; 2; 10	HUN; 3; 12	MAG; 1; 17	MAG; 2; 10	MAG; 3; 9	LEC; 1; 16	LEC; 2; 18	LEC; 3 Ret	9th	97

=== Complete GT World Challenge Europe results ===
==== GT World Challenge Europe Endurance Cup ====
(key) (Races in bold indicate pole position; races in italics indicate fastest lap)

Year	Team	Car	Class	1	2	3	4	5	6	7	Pos.	Points
2021	CMR	Bentley Continental GT3	Pro-Am	MON; 31	LEC; Ret						34th	4
2021	CMR	Bentley Continental GT3	Silver			SPA; 6H; 20	SPA; 12H; 29	SPA; 24H; Ret	NÜR; 28	CAT; 32	29th	8
2022	Emil Frey Racing	Lamborghini Huracán GT3 Evo	Silver	IMO; 28	LEC; Ret	SPA; 6H; 17	SPA; 12H; 18	SPA; 24H; 16	HOC; 7	CAT; 14	3rd	73
