= Victor Martins =

French racing driver (born 2001)

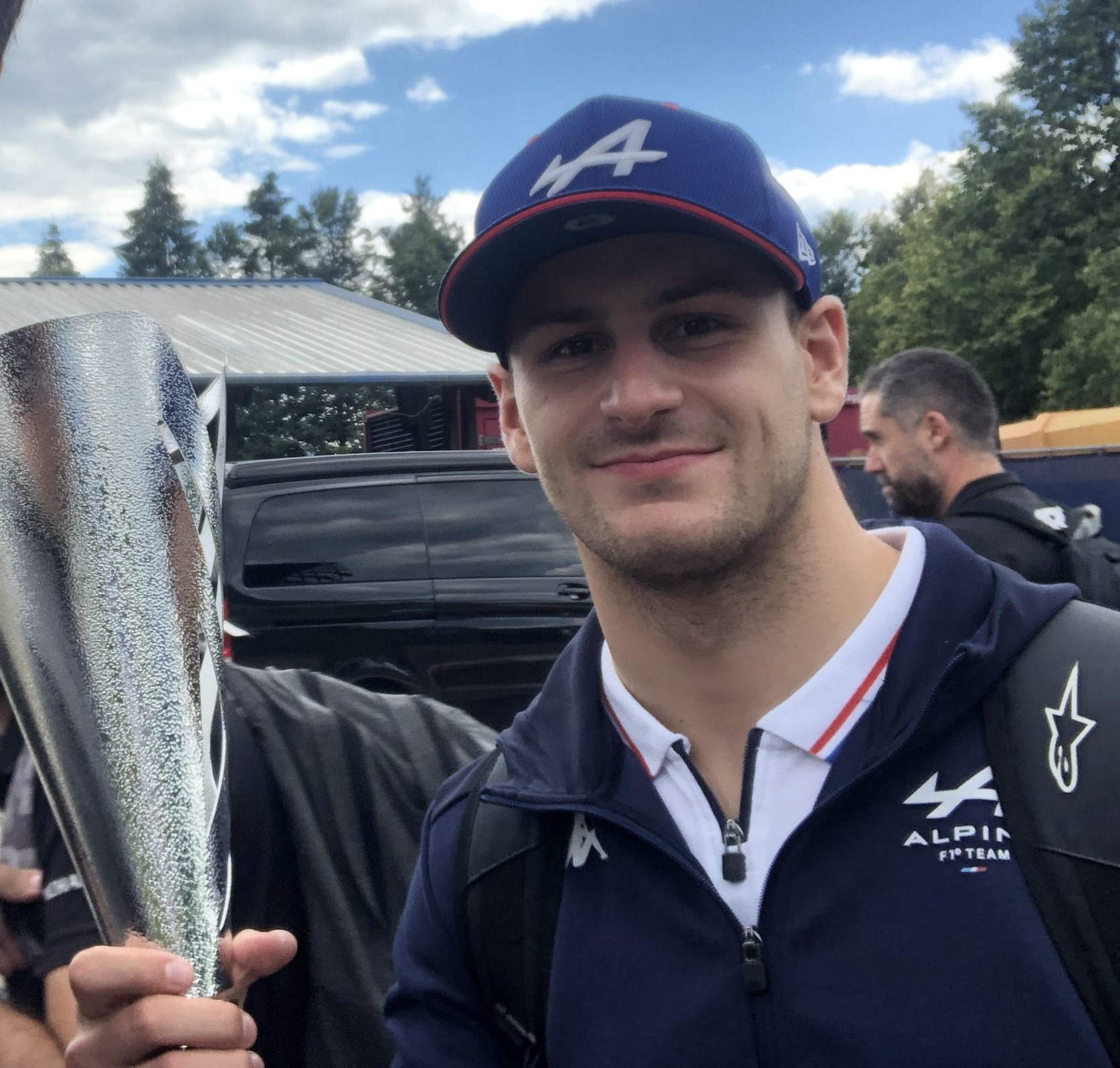
- Martins at the 2022 Spielberg Formula 3 round
- Nationality: (France) French
- Born: 16 June 2001 (age 25) Quincy-sous-Sénart, Essone, France

FIA World Endurance Championship career
- Debut season: 2026
- Current team: Alpine Endurance Team
- Categorisation: FIA Gold
- Car number: 36
- Starts: 8
- Wins: 0
- Podiums: 2
- Poles: 1
- Fastest laps: 1
- Best finish: 13th in 2026 (HY)

Previous series
- 2023–2025; 2021–2022; 2018–2020; 2018; 2016–2017: FIA Formula 2; FIA Formula 3; Formula Renault Eurocup; Formula Renault NEC; French F4

Championship titles
- 2022; 2020; 2017: FIA Formula 3; Formula Renault Eurocup; French F4 Junior

Awards
- 2023: Anthoine Hubert Award
Medal record
Motor racing
Representing France
Race of Champions
Winner	2025 Sydney	Team

Victor Martins (French pronunciation: [vik.tɔʁ maʁ.tɛ̃s]; born 16 June 2001) is a French racing driver who competes in the FIA World Endurance Championship for the Alpine Endurance Team. He also serves as the test and development driver for Williams in Formula One.

A former member of the Alpine Academy, Martins won the 2020 Formula Renault Eurocup and the 2022 FIA Formula 3 Championship. He spent three years in Formula 2 from 2023 to 2025 with ART Grand Prix, where he was the 2023 recipient of the Anthoine Hubert Award by virtue of finishing as top rookie.

== Junior racing career ==
=== Karting ===
Born in Quincy-sous-Sénart to a French mother and a Portuguese father, Martins began karting in 2013 after a spell in gymnastics in which he became French gymnastics champion at the age of ten. In 2016, he went on to win the CIK-FIA Junior World Karting Championship title in dominant fashion, leading pundits to liken Martins to Stoffel Vandoorne. In December 2016, Motorsport.com listed Martins as one of the ten karting drivers to look out for, ranking him second to Logan Sargeant. Throughout his karting career, Martins won many other major competitions.

=== Formula 4 ===
==== 2016 ====
Whilst karting in 2016, Martins partook as a guest driver in the fifth round of the French F4 Championship, in which he claimed two podiums.

==== 2017 ====
Martins stepped up to single-seaters in 2017, returning to contest the French F4 Championship full-time. Martins won twice during the first weekend, and won another in the next round, despite having a further win being excluded due to collision. His fourth and final win came at the very final race, which was enough to be crowned junior champion and overall vice-champion. He claimed nine poles, ten fastest laps and eleven podiums in total.

=== Formula Renault ===
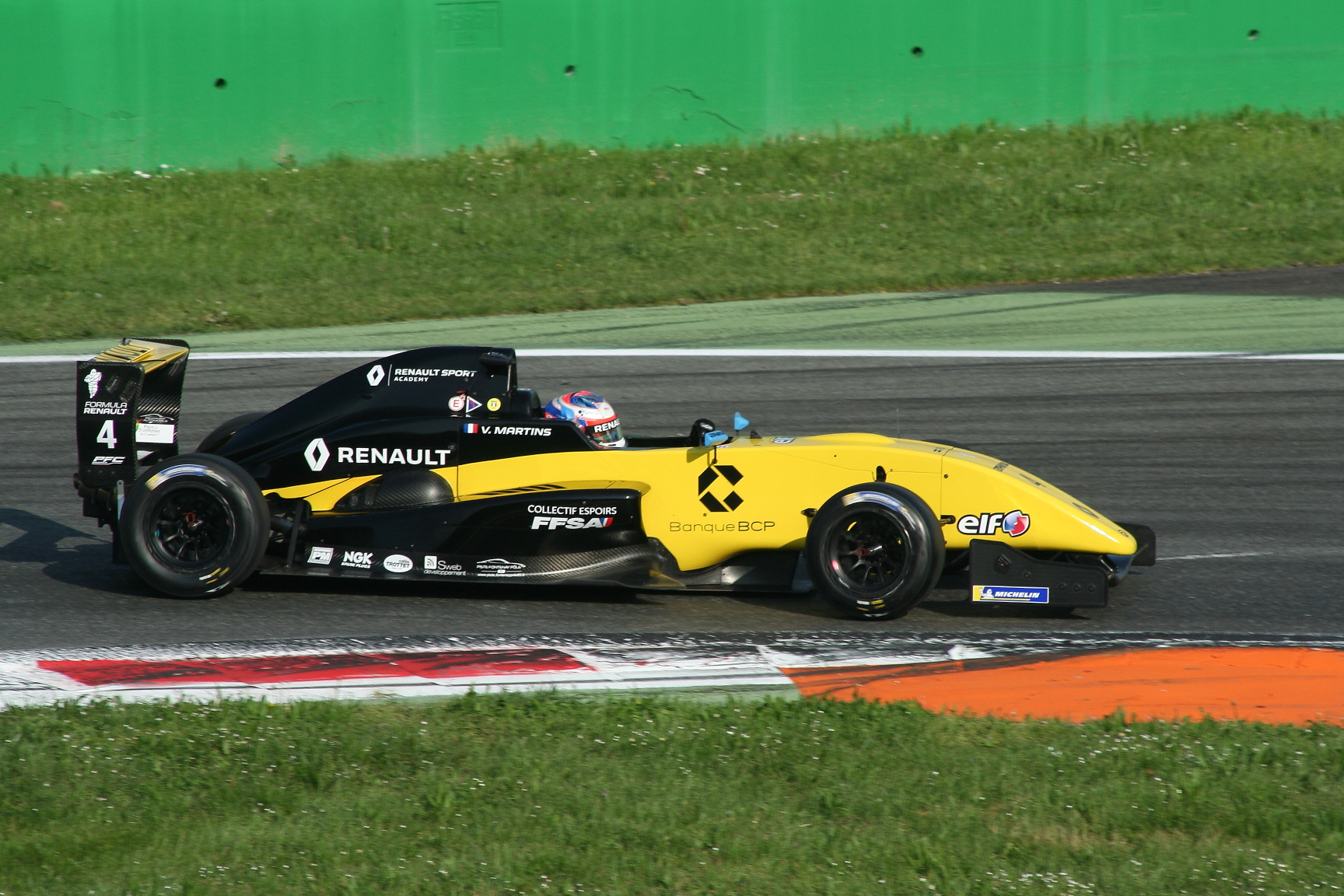
Martins driving in the 2018 Formula Renault Eurocup

==== 2018 ====
After driving for them during post-season testing, Martins signed to race with the R-ace GP outfit for the 2018 Formula Renault Eurocup. Martins took his first Eurocup win during the midpoint of the season at the Red Bull Ring, and later another at Spa-Francorchamps. Overall, he claimed two pole positions and six podiums, which placed him fifth in the overall standings. Martins also contested the NEC championship, claiming his maiden Formula Renault victory at Monza. Following the third round however, Martins was ineligible for points, which ranked him sixth.

==== 2019 ====
Martins returned for the 2019 championship, switching to MP Motorsport, which had carried Martins's fellow Renault junior Christian Lundgaard to second in the championship the previous year. Before the season, he participated in the final round of the 2019 Asian F3 Winter Series. Martins had an average start to the first half of the season, scoring only one win but was level with leader Oscar Piastri at the halfway mark. Martins recorded five wins in the last four rounds and finished runner-up to Piastri, with 7.5 points splitting the pair at the end of the year. Martins won six races, achieving 14 podiums throughout the year, three more than rival Piastri. In an article by Motorsport.com, Martins was ranked ninth of the top 20 junior single-seater drivers of 2019.

==== 2020 ====
Martins moved to ART Grand Prix for the 2020 season of the championship, partnering Grégoire Saucy and rookie Paul Aron. Martins took his first two victories during the Nürburgring round, hauling himself into title contention. There would be more success to come, with four wins coming from the next six races. Martins won one more race in Imola. In a hard-fought battle with Brazilian Caio Collet, Martins came out on top. After a total of seven victories and a nine race-long podium streak during the middle of the season, he ended up 44 points ahead of Collet.

=== FIA Formula 3 Championship ===
==== 2021: Top rookie ====
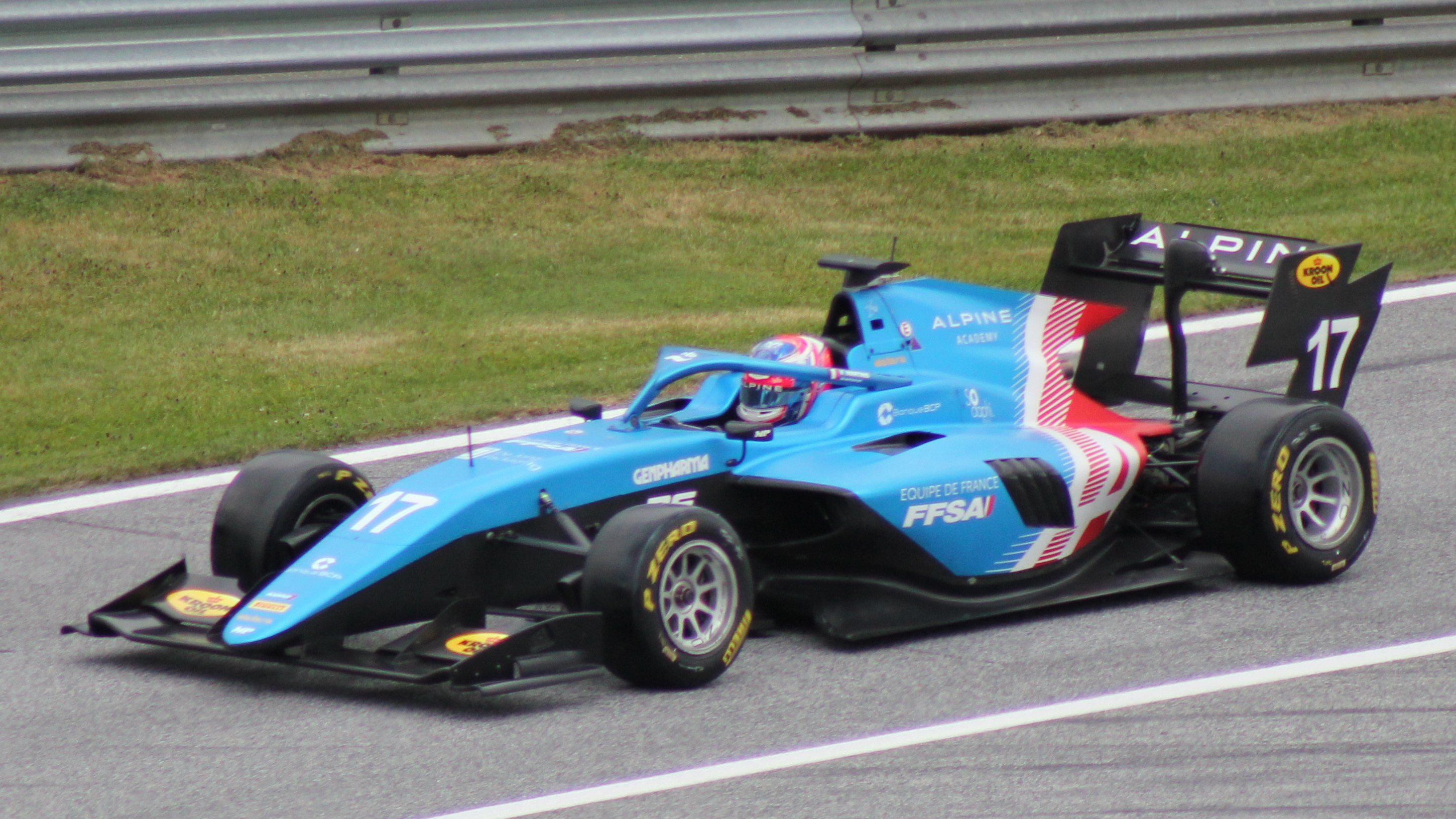
Martins driving the Dallara F3 2019 during the 2021 Spielberg Formula 3 round

In October 2020, Martins joined ART Grand Prix for the post-season test at Catalunya, which saw him finish in the top ten across all four sessions, with a highest placed finish of fifth on the first day. He ended up signing for MP Motorsport for the 2021 Formula 3 season, alongside fellow Alpine junior and Formula Renault Eurocup title rival Caio Collet and Tijmen van der Helm. The Frenchman's season started out positively, qualifying third in the opening round. He took his first podium in second place in Race 2 after a last-lap battle with Olli Caldwell. In Race 3, Martins moved up to second at the start but eventually slipped to fifth. Martins qualified third again in his home race in Le Castellet, and pushed himself into the lead of the race by lap 18, but was passed by Alexander Smolyar with just half a lap to go. A second podium came in Race 2 where Martins again charged through the field, finishing third. Martins concluded his podium-laden weekend with a fourth place in Race 3. At the first race in Austria, Martins finished fifth, a post-race penalty depriving him of a podium. A disappointing end to Race 2 followed, Martins lost power on the penultimate lap that saw him retire from second place, and tyre damage with Arthur Leclerc saw him end Race 3 with no points. The Frenchman had a disastrous Budapest round, a poor qualifying was rewarded with zero points in all races.

The no points streak ended at Spa-Francorchamps, where Martins qualified second and scored fifth place in Race 1. In Race 3, Martins battled with Jack Doohan for the feature race victory, eventually having to settle for second as the Frenchman overtook Doohan off-track, being forced to give the lead back. In Zandvoort, Martins continued his qualifying success, securing third. After a decent Race 1, Martins climbed up to the lead in Race 2, and duly took his first win in the series. Late in the race during Race 3, Martins made a failed move on David Schumacher for second place, sending the German driver into the barriers. Martins was handed a ten-second penalty and was dropped to tenth place. Martins qualified 12th for reverse pole during the Sochi finale. He would lose the lead early on to Logan Sargeant, and then lost another position to claim third place. In the last race, Martins concluded his season in eighth place. Martins finished fifth in the drivers' standings with 131 points, scoring one win, five more podiums and four fastest laps, also becoming the best-placed rookie of the season.

==== 2022: Championship season ====
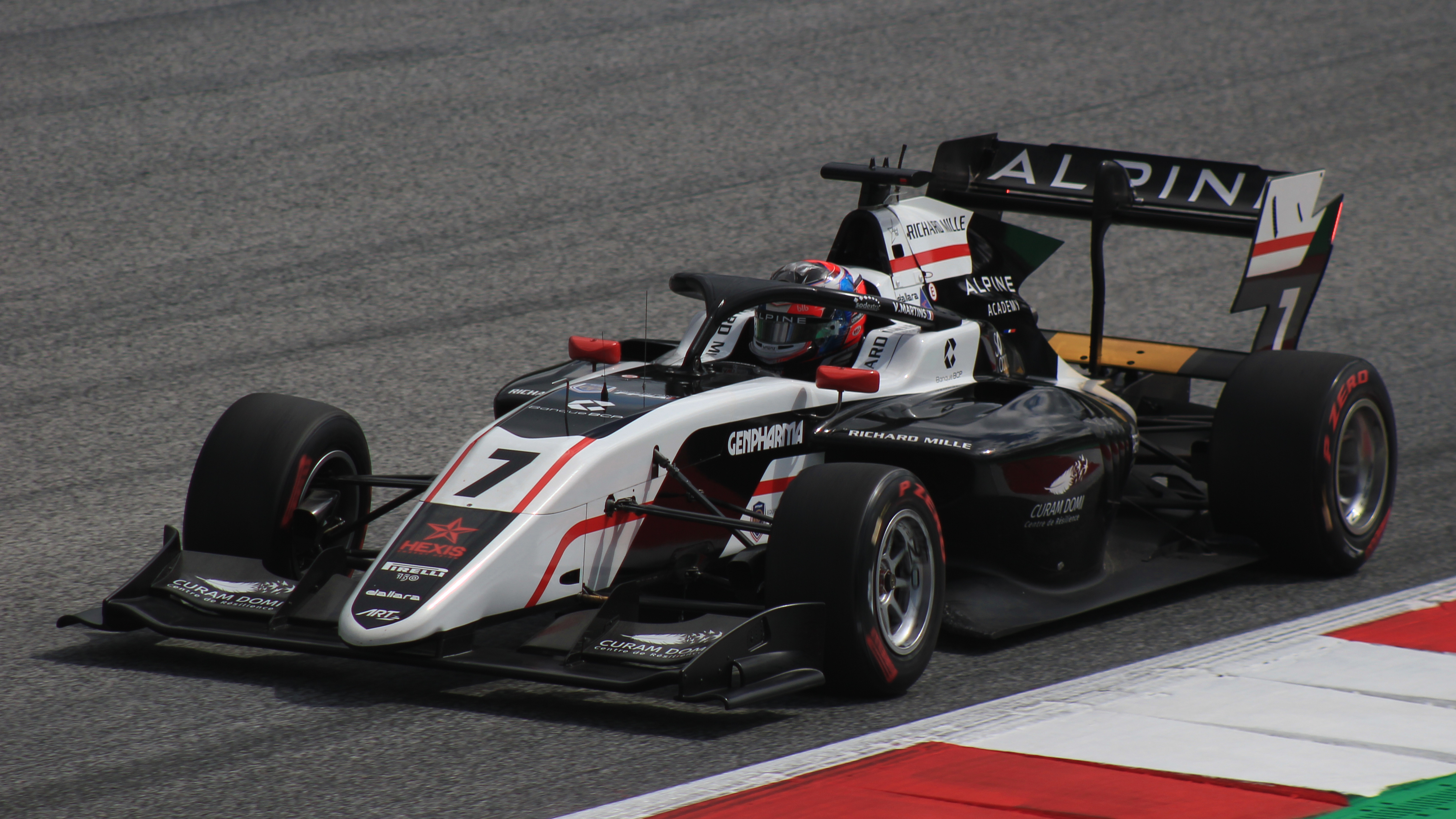
Martins driving for ART Grand Prix during the 2022 Spielberg Formula 3 round

He tested for ART Grand Prix during the post-season testing and the following year, was announced in their line-up for the 2022 campaign. In the opening Bahrain round, Martins had a disappointing start, colliding with teammate Grégoire Saucy, and Martins received a puncture which caused his retirement in the sprint race. Martins took his first win of the season by winning the feature race over Arthur Leclerc, also having to overtake leader Franco Colapinto mid-race. In Imola Martins qualified sixth. In the sprint race, after a great start, Martins took advantage of a last-lap collision to finish second. During the feature race on a drying track, after starting on the wet tyre, Martins was forced to pit but managed to charge to ninth. At Barcelona, Martins qualified on the front row. Martins would suffer a mechanical failure that led to a retirement on Saturday, but during the feature race Martins would overtake polesitter Roman Staněk at the start and control the race for his third win overall.

Martins qualified 11th in Silverstone. From second, he would pass reverse polesitter Reece Ushijima but on the penultimate lap, fell back to second when Isack Hadjar passed him from the lead of the sprint race. In the feature race, Martins finished in seventh place, overtaking Jonny Edgar on the final lap. Martins qualified second at the Red Bull Ring. After achieving two points in the sprint race, he secured another second place in the feature race. In Hungary, he scored sixth and tenth place in the sprint and feature races, in the latter race dropping two positions late in the race.

After the summer break however, Martins experienced a shocking weekend in Belgium, qualifying lowly in 24th thanks to an error on his final flying lap during a mixed-weather session. A jump start in the sprint race before being taken out of the feature race by Kush Maini summed up the disastrous weekend, and also lost the standings lead. He came back fighting in Zandvoort, once again missing out on pole and settling for second. A great start saw him jump four places in the sprint race, and finished seventh. In the feature race, he snatched the lead from Zane Maloney at the start, but lost out to him at the halfway mark. His second placed feature race podium put himself into the lead of the championship with one round remaining.

Before the Monza finale, Martins stated that he "[didn't] want to think, [he] just [wanted] to do". Martins qualified fourth, but in the sprint race he tumbled down the order at the start after making contact with Leclerc. However, he climbed back to tenth place. The feature race ended in under dramatic circumstances due to a crash, with Martins receiving a five-second post-race penalty due to track limits. He took advantage of numerous penalties for other rivals, which demoted Martins only to fourth, thus securing the championship victory and also becoming the first drivers' champion for a team other than Prema in the category. His closest title rival Zane Maloney, who finished a mere five points behind the Frenchman, commented after Martins's title had been confirmed that there was "no one better to win the championship". Overall, Martins achieved two wins, four podiums and 139 points.

=== FIA Formula 2 Championship ===
==== 2023: Top rookie ====
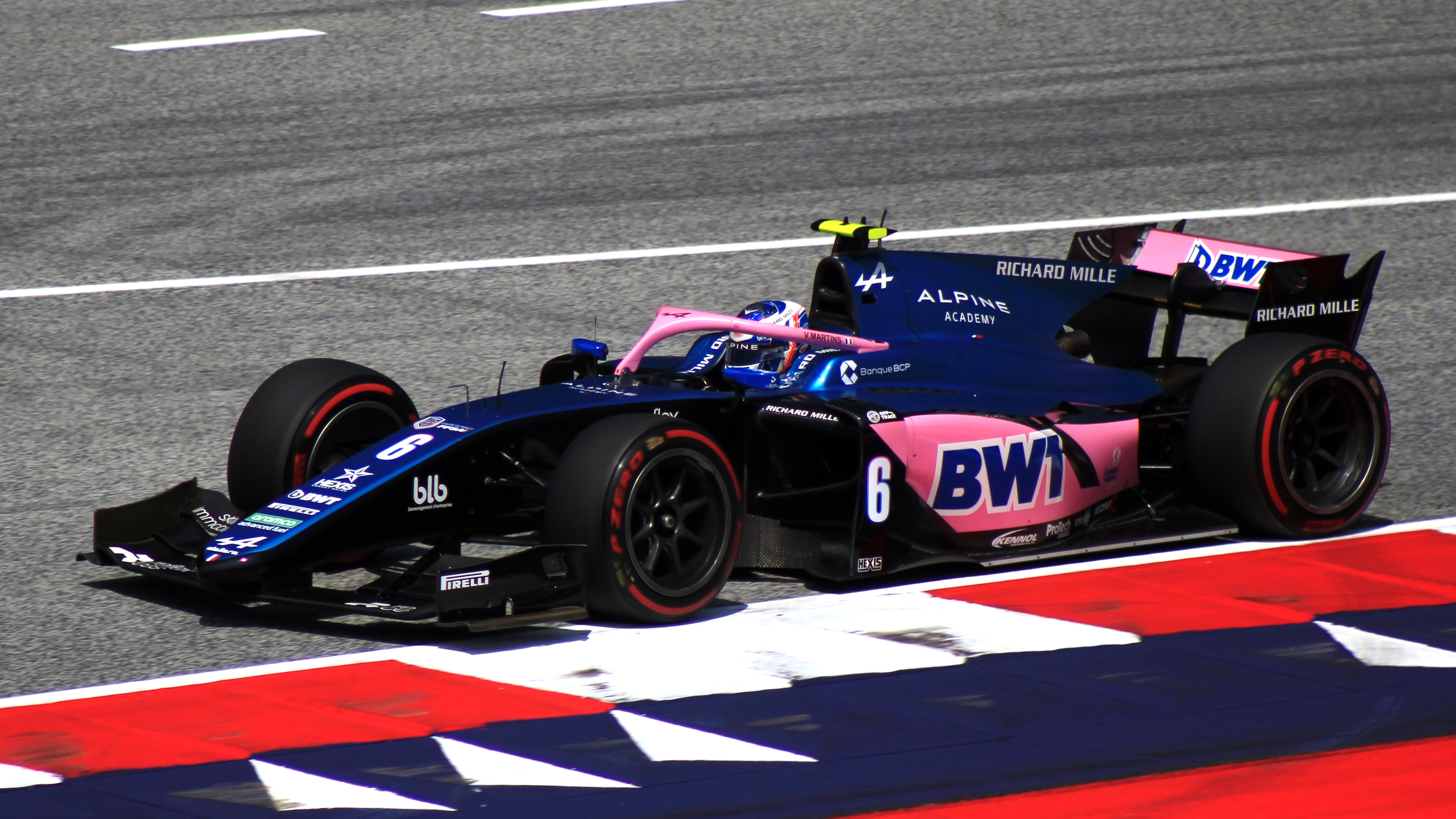
Martins driving the Dallara F2 2018 during the 2023 Spielberg Formula 2 round

At the conclusion of the 2022 F2 season, Martins drove for ART Grand Prix during the post-season test at the Yas Marina Circuit. In January 2023, Martins was announced to be stepping up to Formula 2 with ART alongside fellow Frenchman Théo Pourchaire. Martins qualified second on his debut in Bahrain, and he made an overtake masterclass to take third and his maiden F2 podium. His feature race ended early as he was taken out in a collision on the opening lap. In Jeddah, Martins took pole, 0.7 seconds faster than everyone else. In the sprint race, he made an electric charge to second place, passing car after car. In the feature race, Martins was leading and put under pressure Frederik Vesti when he spun out on lap 16, stalling the car and retiring out of the race.

Martins had a disappointing weekend in Melbourne, qualifying third but crashing out at the end of qualifying. A gamble for wet tyres did not pay off in the sprint race, and whilst running third in the feature race, he slammed into the back of Dennis Hauger during the final stages of the race. Martins received a penalty and dropped to P18. In Baku, having qualified eighth, Martins ran second in the sprint race having started third. However, after a late safety car restart, he had no grip in his cold tyres and crashed out with a handful of laps left. In the feature race, Martins pitted early and it paid off, finishing fourth, but was disqualified post-race due to a technical infringement. In the Monaco feature race, Martins was given a drive-through penalty for failing to slow down under yellow flags where he came close to crashing into track marshals tending to Jack Doohan's burning car. Martins finished the race in eighth as a result of the drive-through penalty.

In Barcelona, Martins qualified in seventh. He moved to second place in the early part of the race, before losing a position to teammate Pourchaire in the last laps, nevertheless it was his first podium since Jeddah. Running the alternate strategy in the feature race, he would emerge around the same position he started, and marched all the way to third place, even nearly pipping Enzo Fittipaldi off second place. Martins secured his second pole of the year in Austria. In the sprint race, he made the right gamble in unpredictable conditions to fit soft tyres, and was rewarded with yet another podium in second place. Martins would lose the lead from pole and fall to fifth, before a late safety car meant drivers on fresher tyres were able to pass him, and he eventually wounded in ninth place.

For a third time, Martins would claim a third pole, in Silverstone. In the sprint race, he was embroiled in a side-by-side battle with Fittipaldi, in which Brazilian won out and Martins finished in seventh. In the feature race, Martins again had a slow start, but would reclaim the lead at the end of sector 1 after passing Ayumu Iwasa off-track. This resulted in a five-second penalty, in which he eventually built a gap over Zane Maloney following the safety car, and finally take his maiden Formula 2 victory by two seconds with the penalty applied. In Budapest, Martins qualified in second. Having ended seventh in the sprint, Martins would lose a position at the start to Vesti, eventually finishing in third. In Spa-Francorchamps, Martins continued his excellent qualifying streak, doing so in third. Martins made up positions during the sprint race, ending in fourth place. Martins again had a slow start during the feature race, but crept back up to third, where he was demoted to fifth place due to a five-second penalty for speeding in the pit lane.

Martins qualified eighth for the Zandvoort Round. He was classified second in the aborted sprint race. In the feature race he went off at the start but he continued. Later, Martins tried to overtake Oliver Bearman into turn 3 but collided with him sending the Prema driver into the barrier. This would earn Martins a ten-second time penalty which would drop him from fifth to ninth in the final classification. Despite that, he was the only driver in the top-six in the standings to score points.

Martins qualified fifth in Monza. During the sprint race, he made his way up to second place six seconds behind race leader Vesti, and despite being faster, he was forced to settle for second. The feature race however was a disaster as he was forced to retire due to engine problems from collision damage earlier in the race ending his top-ten finishing streak since Monaco. It knocked him out of contention, and sat fifth, a point ahead of Bearman in the battle for the Anthoine Hubert Award.

Martins qualified second for the season finale in Yas Marina. The sprint race wouldn't yield any points as he received front wing damage from Juan Manuel Correa spinning into him. Despite that, he bounced back with second place and the fastest lap in the feature race securing him the Anthoine Hubert Award. He finished fifth in the drivers championship with 150 points. During the season he took one win, nine podiums, three pole positions and six fastest laps, whilst helping his team secure its first teams title in Formula 2 history.

==== 2024 ====
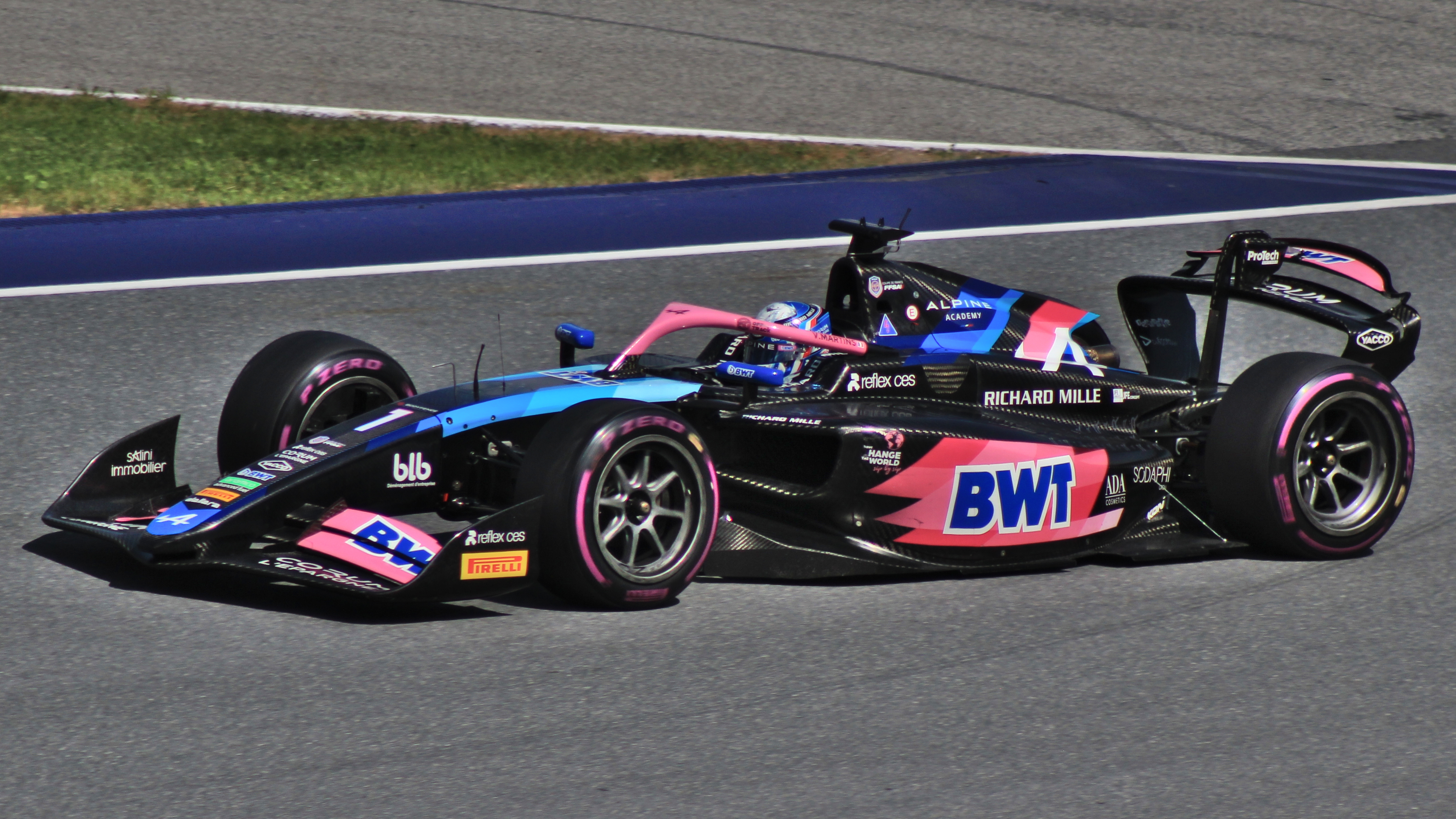
Martins driving for Dallara F2 2024 during the 2024 Spielberg Formula 2 round

In January 2024, ART Grand Prix announced Martins would continue with the team for the 2024 Formula 2 Championship partnering 2023 FIA Formula 3 runner-up and Williams junior Zak O'Sullivan. He experienced an atrocious start to the season in Bahrain, finishing 11th in the sprint and failing to score points as he suffered an engine failure in the feature race. He qualified fourth in Jeddah, but crashed out on the first lap after hitting the wall at Turn 2. In the feature race, Martins would cross the line tenth but received a penalty for colliding with Paul Aron on the penultimate lap dropping him to 11th, marking a disappointing start to the season for the Frenchman. After crashing in qualifying in Melbourne which confined him to 21st for both races, Martins charged through the sprint to seventh place, scoring his first points of the season. He then improved to eighth in the feature race in another comeback drive.

Martins qualified last again in Imola but managed to charge through to ninth meaning on an alternate strategy in the feature race. Banishing woes from previous rounds, Martins secured second in Monaco. He crashed out on the opening lap of the sprint race, and an awful start in the feature race left him languishing him at the back, before recovering to ninth place in another disappointing weekend. In Spain, Martins got a brilliant start from second in the sprint and took the lead from Kush Maini into turn 1. Controlling the lead, he eventually won by four seconds, securing his first win and podium of the year. The feature race was a complete contrast, as Martins was clipped by Dennis Hauger on the opening lap and taken out into the gravel at turn 2.

A pointless weekend in Austria followed, For the next round in Silverstone Qualifying second again in Silverstone, his sprint was a disaster as teammate O'Sullivan would tip him into a spin, putting him out of the race. In the feature race, a battle for the lead with Isack Hadjar saw him lose places running off-track, and was eventually forced to settle with fifth. Qualifying fifth for Hungary, Martins surprisingly managed to take his soft tyres to the end of the race to finish third during the sprint, which became second when winner Richard Verschoor was disqualified. He stormed into the lead at the start of the feature race, but dropped behind Andrea Kimi Antonelli late in the race on softer tyres. Nevertheless, Martins managed to finish second, marking his best weekend of the season. A miserable weekend followed in Belgium as an engine issue in qualifying confined him to last for both races. In the feature race, his woes continued as he was clipped by a spinning Rafael Villagómez on lap 4.

Qualifying fifth for Monza, he gained places to move and finished in second place after losing a battle to Oliver Bearman. He concluded the feature race in sixth after a ferocious battle with the two Prema cars. In Baku, Martins qualified third. Martins would barely miss out on a sprint race podium after missing out on pipping Gabriele Minì by 0.020s. In the feature race, Martins overcame Antonelli and Verschoor to take the lead early on, but lost out to them both during the pit stops. He moved to second after Antonelli collided with Zane Maloney, thus securing Martins's fifth podium of 2024.

Martins qualified third for Qatar. A brilliant start jumped him four places to third in the sprint, and had a long battle with Jak Crawford before his tyres ran out and he finished ninth. A minor collision in the feature race bent his suspension, which forced him to retire on lap 18. Martins took pole for the Abu Dhabi finale. He was tipped into a spin on the opening lap of the sprint race by Ritomo Miyata, ruining his race as he finished down in 19th. Despite a slow start in the feature race, Martins would move back up to second following the pit stops, but struggled and eventually faded to fourth place.

Martins finished seventh in the standings with 107 points with one win and five podiums, two places lower than 2023.

==== 2025 ====
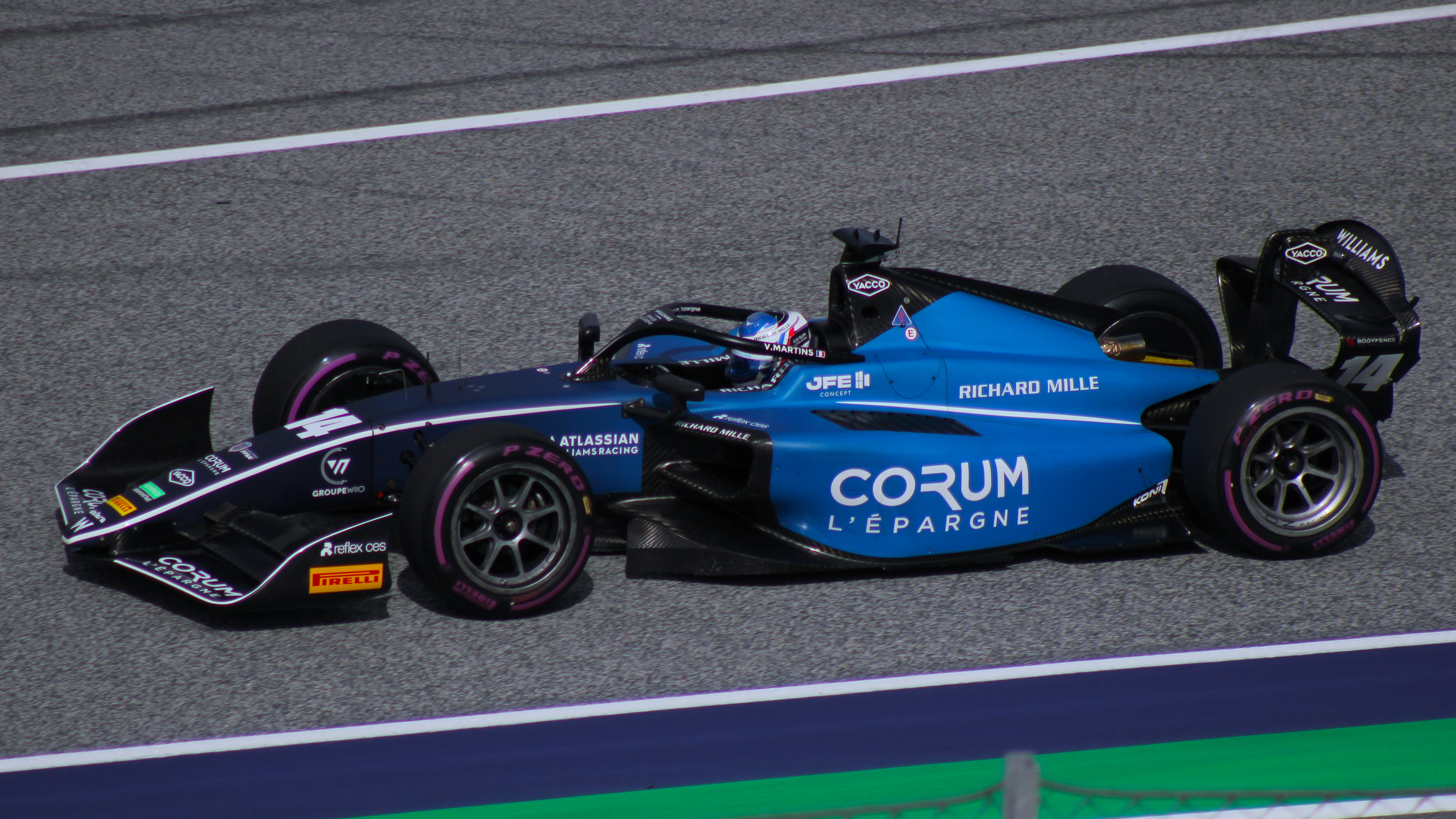
Martins during the 2025 Spielberg Formula 2 round

Martins remained with ART Grand Prix for a third Formula 2 season in 2025, where he teams up with Ritomo Miyata. He stated that the season was "[my] last chance" to prove himself to earn an F1 drive. In Melbourne, he qualified on the front row of the grid, but was promoted to pole position after Gabriele Minì was penalised for impeding. Martins had an early conclusion to his sprint race on lap 2, where he crashed out after a good start. However, the feature race proved to be a missed opportunity for Martins, as it was cancelled due to treacherous rain. Martins qualified on the front row again in Bahrain. He broke his front wing on the opening lap of the sprint race after hitting the polystyrene block, forcing him to pit and he only recovered to 14th. A slow start in the feature race caused Martins to lose positions, but scored his first points in a race that year with fifth place. A fourth consecutive front row start followed in Jeddah. After finishing eighth in the sprint race, he earned his first podium of the season with third place, holding off Leonardo Fornaroli in the final laps.

Martins's streak of top 3 qualifying continued in Imola. A strong start in the sprint race moved him up three places, and he eventually finished in fourth place. Unfortunately for Martins, a stall on the grid in the feature race left him a lap down, and despite a safety car, he was unable to finish in the points. He qualified on the front row for the third successive year in Monaco, His torrid luck continued into the weekend, as he was forced into the wall in the sprint race by Oliver Goethe, before being eliminated in a lap 1 incident with Alex Dunne. He qualified 15th in Barcelona but recovered in both races to finish fifth in the sprint and eighth in the feature. He returned to the front row in Austria, In the feature race, Martins dropped back at the start but assumed the race lead during the pit stops. He struggled with race pace following that, and eventually finished in seventh place. He took his first pole of the season in Silverstone. Martins scored a point during the sprint despite last lap contact with fellow Academy member Luke Browning, but disappointment came in the feature as he suffered front wing damage towards the end of the race of a safety car restart which forced him to retire. He returned to the rostrum during the Spa-Francorchamps sprint race, taking second place having showed strong race pace. He received a time penalty in the feature race which dropped him back following the pit stops but managed to finish in eighth place. In Budapest, Martins had a mixed weekend, finishing fourth in the sprint race after a battle with Arvid Lindblad, but mechanical issues curtailed his feature race mid-race.

He failed to score next time out in Monza, his feature race once again ending early due to a collision with Gabriele Minì. Qatar provided one last hurrah for Martins, as he took the lead at the start of the feature race from second and kept Fornaroli at bay in the closing laps for his first win of the year. He concluded the season on a sour note in Abu Dhabi, finishing seventh after a poor start from third in the sprint, before a collision with Dunne ended his feature race early. Martins placed eleventh in the overall standings with one win, two poles and three podiums. Feeder Series ranked him as the seventh best F2 driver of the season, summarising that Martins was "one of the unluckiest F2 drivers of recent times".

== Formula One ==
=== Renault / Alpine (2018–2019, 2021–2024) ===
In January 2018, Martins was inducted into the Renault Sport Academy. After the 2019 season the French driver was released from the program. Martins rejoined the newly formed Alpine F1 Team academy on 10 February after his Formula Renault Eurocup title win. In May 2023, Martins made his F1 test debut in Monza, driving the Alpine A521. He got another test, this time driving the Alpine A522 a year later in June, at the Red Bull Ring. He again drove the A522 during a test at the Losail International Circuit in November. Before the start of the 2025 season, he was dropped from the Alpine Academy.

=== Williams (2025–present) ===
On 31 March 2025, it was announced that Martins joined the Williams Driver Academy. He partook in his first F1 test for the team a few days later in Monza. Martins made his free practice debut at the Spanish Grand Prix, in place of Alexander Albon. In 2026, Martins was promoted by Williams to serve as their test and development driver for the 2026 season.

== Endurance racing career ==
=== FIA World Endurance Championship ===
Martins partook in the WEC rookie test in November 2024 with the Alpine Endurance Team, driving the Hypercar at the Bahrain International Circuit. He completed the session fourth quickest, highest of the rookies.

==== 2026 ====
After three seasons in Formula 2, Martins switched to endurance racing in 2026, joining Alpine to compete in the FIA World Endurance Championship.

== Other racing ==
=== Formula E ===
In April 2023, Nissan announced that Martins would test for them in the Formula E Berlin rookie test. He then took part in the rookie pre-season test with the team for the 2023–24 season. Martins returned to Formula E machinery in March 2026, driving for Nissan during the Madrid rookie test.

=== Race of Champions ===
Martins competed in the 2025 Race of Champions, and he also drove for Team France alongside rally driver Sébastien Loeb. The duo won the Nations Cup.

=== Indy NXT ===
In October 2025, Martins partook in an Indy NXT test with HMD Motorsports at the Indianapolis Motor Speedway and with Juncos Hollinger Racing at the Barber Motorsports Park.

== Personal life ==
Martins currently lives in Paris, and was a champion in gymnastics at a young age.

== Karting record ==
=== Karting career summary ===
Season	Series	Team	Position
2014	Championnat Regional Île de France — Cadet		13th
2014	Championnat de France — Cadet		6th
2014	Challenge Rotax Max France — Cadet		**3rd**
2015	Trophée Interclub — Cadet		**3rd**
2015	Trophée Oscar Petit — Cadet		**1st**
2015	National Series Karting — Cadet		**2nd**
2015	Coupe de France — Cadet		4th
2015	Challenge Rotax Max France — Cadet		4th
2015	Championnat de France — Cadet		**3rd**
2016	WSK Champions Cup — OKJ	VDK Racing	NC
2016	Championnat de Belgique — X30 Junior	VDK Racing	**1st**
2016	X30 Challenge Europa — X30 Junior	VDK Racing	**2nd**
2016	WSK Super Master Series — OKJ	VDK Racing	20th
2016	CIK-FIA Karting European Championship — OKJ	VDK Racing	**3rd**
2016	WSK Final Cup — OKJ	VDK Racing	**1st**
2016	IAME International Final — X30 Junior	VDK Racing	13th
2016	CIK-FIA World Championship — OKJ	VDK Racing	**1st**
2017	WSK Champions Cup — OK	VDK Racing	8th
2017	WSK Super Master Series — OK	VDK Racing	20th

=== Complete CIK-FIA Karting European Championship results ===
(key) (Races in bold indicate pole position) (Races in italics indicate fastest lap)

Year	Team	Class	1	2	3	4	5	6	7	8	9	10	11	12	DC	Points
2016	VDK Racing	OKJ	ZUE; QH; 30	ZUE; PF; 9	ZUE; R 32	ADR; QH; 16	ADR; PF; 10	ADR; R 12	PRT; QH; 9	PRT; PF; 1	**PRT**; **R** 1	GEN; QH; 1	GEN; PF; 1	**GEN**; **R** 1	3rd	109

== Racing record ==
=== Career summary ===
Season	Series	Team	Races	Wins	Poles	F/Laps	Podiums	Points	Position
2016	French F4 Championship	FFSA Academy	4	0	0	0	2	0	NC†
2017	French F4 Championship	FFSA Academy	21	4	9	10	11	299	**2nd**
2018	Formula Renault Eurocup	R-ace GP	20	2	2	1	6	186	5th
2018	Formula Renault NEC	R-ace GP	12	1	1	3	2	83	6th‡
2019	Formula Renault Eurocup	MP Motorsport	19	6	9	5	14	312.5	**2nd**
2019	F3 Asian Winter Series	Pinnacle Motorsport	3	0	0	0	2	0	NC†
2020	Formula Renault Eurocup	ART Grand Prix	20	7	10	8	14	348	**1st**
2021	FIA Formula 3 Championship	MP Motorsport	20	1	0	4	6	131	5th
2022	FIA Formula 3 Championship	ART Grand Prix	18	2	0	1	6	139	**1st**
2023	FIA Formula 2 Championship	ART Grand Prix	26	1	3	6	9	150	5th
2024	FIA Formula 2 Championship	ART Grand Prix	28	1	1	2	5	107	7th
2025	FIA Formula 2 Championship	ART Grand Prix	27	1	2	1	3	97	11th
2025	Formula One	Atlassian Williams Racing	Test driver						
2026	FIA World Endurance Championship - Hypercar	Alpine Endurance Team	8	0	1	1	2	54	13th
2026	Formula One	Atlassian Williams F1 Team	Test/Development driver						
2026-27	Asian Le Mans Series - LMP2	Proton Competition							

^{†} As Martins was a guest driver, he was ineligible for points.
^{‡} Martins was ineligible for points from the third round onwards.
* Season still in progress.

=== Complete French F4 Championship results ===
(key) (Races in bold indicate pole position) (Races in italics indicate fastest lap)

Year	1	2	3	4	5	6	7	8	9	10	11	12	13	14	15	16	17	18	19	20	21	22	23	Pos	Points
2016	LEC; 1	LEC; 2	LEC; 3	LEC; 4	PAU; 1	PAU; 2	PAU; 3	PAU; 4	LÉD; 1	LÉD; 2	LÉD; 3	LÉD; 4	MAG; 1	MAG; 2	MAG; 3	MAG; 4	LMS; 1; 4	LMS; 2; 10	LMS; 3; 3	LMS; 4; 3	CAT; 1	CAT; 2	CAT; 3	NC†	0
2017	**NOG**; **1**; 1	NOG; 2; 11	**NOG**; **3**; 1	**MNZ**; **1**; 1	MNZ; 2; 4	**MNZ**; **3** EX	PAU; 1; 2	PAU; 2; 8	PAU; 3; 16	SPA; 1; 4	SPA; 2; 2	SPA; 3; 2	**MAG**; **1**; 2	MAG; 2; 13	MAG; 3; 2	**CAT**; **1**; 2	CAT; 2; 4	**CAT**; **3**; 2	**LEC**; **1**; 7	LEC; 2; 5	**LEC**; **3**; 1			2nd	299

^{†} As Martins was a guest driver, he was ineligible for points.

=== Complete Formula Renault Northern European Cup results ===
(key) (Races in bold indicate pole position) (Races in italics indicate fastest lap)

Year	Team	1	2	3	4	5	6	7	8	9	10	11	12	DC	Points
2018	R-ace GP	PAU; 1; 5	PAU; 2; 4	MNZ; 1; 3	**MNZ**; **2**; 1	SPA; 1 Ret	SPA; 2; 1	HUN; 1; 4	HUN; 2; 9	NÜR; 1; 4	NÜR; 2; 2	HOC; 1 Ret	HOC; 2 Ret	6th‡	83

^{‡} Martins was ineligible for points from the third round onwards.

=== Complete Formula Renault Eurocup results ===
(key) (Races in bold indicate pole position) (Races in italics indicate fastest lap)

Year	Team	1	2	3	4	5	6	7	8	9	10	11	12	13	14	15	16	17	18	19	20	Pos	Points
2018	R-ace GP	LEC; 1; 11	LEC; 2; 4	MNZ; 1; 6	MNZ; 2; 5	SIL; 1; 6	SIL; 2; 6	MON; 1; 3	MON; 2; 3	RBR; 1; 9	**RBR**; **2**; 1	SPA; 1 Ret	SPA; 2; 1	HUN; 1; 4	HUN; 2; 9	NÜR; 1; 4	NÜR; 2; 2	HOC; 1 Ret	HOC; 2 Ret	CAT; 1 Ret	**CAT**; **2**; 3	5th	186
2019	MP Motorsport	MNZ; 1; 4	MNZ; 2; 2	SIL; 1; 10	SIL; 2; 3	**MON**; **1**; 1	MON; 2; 2	LEC; 1; 3	LEC; 2; 3	**SPA**; **1**; 2	SPA; 2; 5	NÜR; 1; 5	NÜR; 2 DNS	**HUN**; **1**; 1	HUN; 2; 3	**CAT**; **1**; 1	**CAT**; **2**; 1	**HOC**; **1**; 1	**HOC**; **2**; 5	**YMC**; **1**; 2	**YMC**; **2**; 1	2nd	312.5
2020	ART Grand Prix	MNZ; 1; 10	**MNZ**; **2**; 2	IMO; 1; 4	IMO; 2; 4	**NÜR**; **1**; 1	**NÜR**; **2**; 1	MAG; 1; 3	**MAG**; **2**; 1	**ZAN**; **1**; 1	ZAN; 2; 2	**CAT**; **1**; 1	**CAT**; **2**; 1	**SPA**; **1**; 2‡	**SPA**; **2**; 4	IMO; 1; 5	**IMO**; **2**; 1	HOC; 1; 2	HOC; 2; 2	LEC; 1; 4	LEC; 2; 2	1st	348

^{‡} Half points awarded as less than 75% of race distance was completed.

=== Complete FIA Formula 3 Championship results ===
(key) (Races in bold indicate pole position; races in italics indicate points for the fastest lap of top ten finishers)

Year	Entrant	1	2	3	4	5	6	7	8	9	10	11	12	13	14	15	16	17	18	19	20	21	DC	Points
2021	MP Motorsport	CAT; 1; 9	CAT; 2; 2	CAT; 3; 5	LEC; 1; 2	LEC; 2; 3	LEC; 3; 4	RBR; 1; 5	RBR; 2; 26†	RBR; 3; 24	HUN; 1; 15	HUN; 2; 25	HUN; 3; 27	SPA; 1; 5	SPA; 2; 7	SPA; 3; 2	ZAN; 1; 8	ZAN; 2; 1	ZAN; 3; 10	SOC; 1; 3	SOC; 2 C	SOC; 3; 8	5th	131
2022	ART Grand Prix	BHR; SPR; Ret	BHR; FEA; 1	IMO; SPR; 2	IMO; FEA; 9	CAT; SPR; Ret	CAT; FEA; 1	SIL; SPR; 2	SIL; FEA; 7	RBR; SPR; 8	RBR; FEA; 2	HUN; SPR; 6	HUN; FEA; 10	SPA; SPR; 21	SPA; FEA; Ret	ZAN; SPR; 7	ZAN; FEA; 2	MNZ; SPR; 10	MNZ; FEA; 4				1st	139

^{†} Driver did not finish the race, but was classified as they completed more than 90% of the race distance.

=== Complete FIA Formula 2 Championship results ===
(key) (Races in bold indicate pole position) (Races in italics indicate points for the fastest lap of top ten finishers)

Year	Entrant	1	2	3	4	5	6	7	8	9	10	11	12	13	14	15	16	17	18	19	20	21	22	23	24	25	26	27	28	DC	Points
2023	ART Grand Prix	BHR; SPR; 3	BHR; FEA; Ret	JED; SPR; 2	**JED**; **FEA**; Ret	MEL; SPR; 15	MEL; FEA; 18	BAK; SPR; 13†	BAK; FEA; DSQ	MCO; SPR; 7	MCO; FEA; 8	CAT; SPR; 3	CAT; FEA; 3	RBR; SPR; 2	**RBR**; **FEA**; 9	SIL; SPR; 7	**SIL**; **FEA**; 1	HUN; SPR; 7	HUN; FEA; 3	SPA; SPR; 4	SPA; FEA; 5	ZAN; SPR; 2	ZAN; FEA; 9	MNZ; SPR; 2	MNZ; FEA; Ret	YMC; SPR; 20	YMC; FEA; 2			5th	150
2024	ART Grand Prix	BHR; SPR; 11	BHR; FEA; Ret	JED; SPR; Ret	JED; FEA; 11	MEL; SPR; 7	MEL; FEA; 8	IMO; SPR; 12	IMO; FEA; 9	MON; SPR; Ret	MON; FEA; 9	CAT; SPR; 1	CAT; FEA; Ret	RBR; SPR; 10	RBR; FEA; 11	SIL; SPR; Ret	SIL; FEA; 5	HUN; SPR; 2	HUN; FEA; 2	SPA; SPR; 12	SPA; FEA; Ret	MNZ; SPR; 2	MNZ; FEA; 6	BAK; SPR; 4	BAK; FEA; 2	LSL; SPR; 9	LSL; FEA; NC	YMC; SPR; 19	**YMC**; **FEA**; 4	7th	107
2025	ART Grand Prix	MEL; SPR; Ret	**MEL**; **FEA**; C	BHR; SPR; 14	BHR; FEA; 5	JED; SPR; 8	JED; FEA; 3	IMO; SPR; 4	IMO; FEA; 12	MON; SPR; 17	MON; FEA; Ret	CAT; SPR; 5	CAT; FEA; 8	RBR; SPR; 7	RBR; FEA; 7	SIL; SPR; 8	**SIL**; **FEA**; 19†	SPA; SPR; 2	SPA; FEA; 8	HUN; SPR; 4	HUN; FEA; Ret	MNZ; SPR; 19	MNZ; FEA; Ret	BAK; SPR; 8	BAK; FEA; 15	LSL; SPR; 11	LSL; FEA; 1	YMC; SPR; 7	YMC; FEA; Ret	11th	97

=== Complete Formula One participations ===
(key) (Races in bold indicate pole position) (Races in italics indicate fastest lap)

Year	Entrant	Chassis	Engine	1	2	3	4	5	6	7	8	9	10	11	12	13	14	15	16	17	18	19	20	21	22	23	24	WDC	Points
2025	Atlassian Williams Racing	Williams FW47	Mercedes-AMG F1 M16 V6 t	AUS	CHN	JPN	BHR	SAU	MIA	EMI	MON	ESP; TD	CAN	AUT	GBR	BEL	HUN	NED	ITA	AZE	SIN	USA	MXC	SAP	LVG	QAT	ABU	–	–

=== Complete FIA World Endurance Championship results ===
(key) (Races in bold indicate pole position; results in italics indicate fastest lap)

Year	Entrant	Class	Chassis	Engine	1	2	3	4	5	6	7	8	Rank	Points
2026	Alpine Endurance Team	Hypercar	Alpine A424	Alpine V634 3.4 L Turbo V6	IMO; 11	SPA; 11	LMS; 10	SÃO; 11	COA; 5	**FUJ**; 2	CAT; 8	MNZ; 2	13th	54

=== Complete 24 Hours of Le Mans results ===
Year	Team	Co-Drivers	Car	Class	Laps	Pos.	Class Pos.
2026	(France) Alpine Endurance Team	(France) Jules Gounon (France) Frédéric Makowiecki	Alpine A424	Hypercar	379	10th	10th

Sporting positions
Preceded by Oscar Piastri	Formula Renault Eurocup; Champion; 2020	Succeeded by None (merged into FRECA)
Preceded by Dennis Hauger	FIA Formula 3 Championship; Champion; 2022	Succeeded by Gabriel Bortoleto
