= Arthur Rougier =

French racing driver (born 2000)

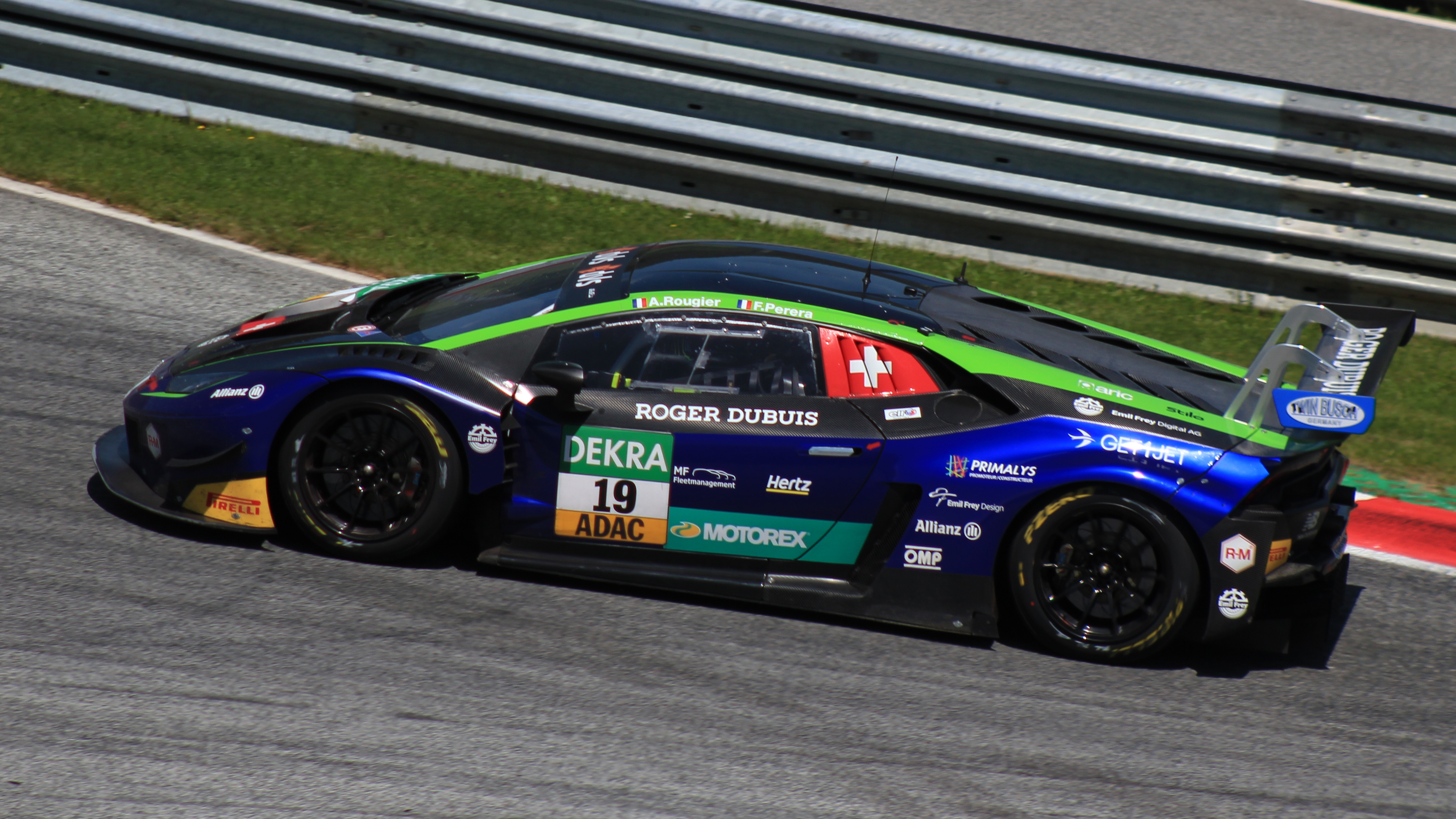
- Rougier competing in the ADAC GT Masters in 2022
- Nationality: (France) French
- Born: Arthur Simon Rougier; 7 January 2000 (age 26) Limoges, France

GT World Challenge Europe Sprint Cup career
- Debut season: 2020
- Current team: Emil Frey Racing
- Categorisation: FIA Silver (until 2021); FIA Gold (2022–)
- Car number: 114
- Wins: 1
- Podiums: 5
- Poles: 1
- Fastest laps: 0
- Best finish: 7th in 2020

Previous series
- 2019 2018 2018 2016-2017: French GT4 Cup; Formula Renault Eurocup; Formula Renault NEC; French F4 Championship

Championship titles
- 2017: French F4 Championship

Arthur Simon Rougier (born 20 July 2000) is a French racing driver who is currently competing in the GT World Challenge Europe with CSA Racing. He was the 2017 French F4 champion and part of the Renault Sport Academy the following year. Since 2025, Rougier has been employed as a factory driver for McLaren's GT3 program.

== Racing record ==
=== Racing career summary ===
Season	Series	Team	Races	Wins	Poles	F/Laps	Podiums	Points	Position
2016	French F4 Championship	FFSA Academy	23	1	0	2	2	119	10th
2017	French F4 Championship	FFSA Academy	21	5	4	2	12	303	**1st**
2018	Formula Renault Eurocup	Fortec Motorsports	18	0	0	0	0	26	15th
2018	Formula Renault NEC	Fortec Motorsports	2	0	0	0	0	0	NC†
2019	French GT4 Cup - Pro-Am	CD Sport	12	0	0	0	3	96	**3rd**
2020	GT World Challenge Europe Sprint Cup	Saintéloc Racing	10	0	0	0	3	52.5	7th
2020	GT World Challenge Europe Endurance Cup	Saintéloc Racing	1	0	0	0	1	15	20th
2020	Championnat de France FFSA GT - Pro-Am Cup	Saintéloc Racing	4	0	0	0	0	0	22nd
2021	GT World Challenge Europe Sprint Cup	Emil Frey Racing	6	0	0	0	1	14.5	20th
2021	GT World Challenge Europe Endurance Cup	Emil Frey Racing	5	0	0	0	0	10	16th
2021	Intercontinental GT Challenge	Emil Frey Racing	1	0	0	0	0	0	NC†
2022	ADAC GT Masters	Emil Frey Racing	14	0	1	1	3	120	5th
2022	GT World Challenge Europe Endurance Cup	Emil Frey Racing	5	0	0	0	0	0	NC
2022	Intercontinental GT Challenge	Emil Frey Racing							
2023	GT World Challenge Europe Endurance Cup	CSA Racing	5	0	0	1	0	0	NC
2024	GT World Challenge Europe Endurance Cup	CSA Racing	5	0	0	0	0	0	NC
2025	GT World Challenge Europe Endurance Cup	CSA Racing	5	0	0	0	0	9	19th
2025	GT World Challenge Europe Sprint Cup	CSA Racing	7	0	0	1	0	0	NC
2025	GT World Challenge Europe Sprint Cup - Gold	CSA Racing	2	0	0	1	0	9	10th
2025	GT World Challenge Europe Sprint Cup - Bronze	CSA Racing	5	0	0	1	2	31.5	8th
2026	GT World Challenge Europe Endurance Cup	CSA Racing	4	0	0	0	0	4	30th
2026	GT World Challenge Europe Sprint Cup	CSA Racing	10	0	0	0	0	4.5	26th
2026	Italian GT Championship Endurance Cup - GT3	CSA Racing	2	0	1	0	0	17	NC†

^{†} As Rougier was a guest driver, he was ineligible for points.
*Season still in progress

=== Complete French F4 Championship results ===
(key) (Races in bold indicate pole position) (Races in italics indicate fastest lap)

Year	1	2	3	4	5	6	7	8	9	10	11	12	13	14	15	16	17	18	19	20	21	22	23	Pos	Points
2016	LEC; 1; 11	LEC; 2; 7	LEC; 3; 8	LEC; 4; 6	PAU; 1; 7	PAU; 2; 6	PAU; 3; 4	PAU; 4; 6	LÉD; 1; 8	LÉD; 2; 10	LÉD; 3; 13	LÉD; 4; 11	MAG; 1; 11	MAG; 2; 8	MAG; 3; 13	MAG; 4; 12	LMS; 1; 8	LMS; 2; 6	LMS; 3 Ret	LMS; 4 Ret	CAT; 1; 3	CAT; 2; 15	CAT; 3; 1	10th	119
2017	NOG; 1; 3	NOG; 2; 5	NOG; 3; 7	MNZ; 1; 5	MNZ; 2; 5	MNZ; 3; 2	**PAU**; **1**; 1	PAU; 2; 7	**PAU**; **3**; 1	**SPA**; **1**; 1	SPA; 2; 1	**SPA**; **3**; 1	MAG; 1; 4	MAG; 2; 6	MAG; 3; 5	CAT; 1; 8	CAT; 2; 2	CAT; 3; 7	LEC; 1; 2	LEC; 2; 3	LEC; 3; 2			1st	303

=== Complete Formula Renault NEC results ===
(key) (Races in bold indicate pole position) (Races in italics indicate fastest lap)

Year	Entrant	1	2	3	4	5	6	7	8	9	10	11	12	DC	Points
2018	Fortec Motorsports	PAU; 1; 8	PAU; 2; 8	MNZ; 1	MNZ; 2	SPA; 1; 4	SPA; 2; 6	HUN; 1 Ret	HUN; 2; 8	NÜR; 1; 10	NÜR; 2; 13	HOC; 1; 12	HOC; 2; 10	14th	26

=== Complete Formula Renault Eurocup results ===
(key) (Races in bold indicate pole position) (Races in italics indicate fastest lap)

Year	Team	1	2	3	4	5	6	7	8	9	10	11	12	13	14	15	16	17	18	19	20	Pos	Points
2018	Fortec Motorsports	LEC; 1 Ret	LEC; 2; 15	MNZ; 1; 18	MNZ; 2; 20	SIL; 1; 15	SIL; 2 Ret	MON; 1; 27	MON; 2; 14	RBR; 1; 11	RBR; 2; 14	SPA; 1; 4	SPA; 2; 6	HUN; 1 Ret	HUN; 2; 8	NÜR; 1; 10	NÜR; 2; 13	HOC; 1; 12	HOC; 2; 10	CAT; 1 WD	CAT; 2 WD	15th	26

=== Complete GT World Challenge Europe results ===
==== GT World Challenge Europe Endurance Cup ====
(key) (Races in bold indicate pole position) (Races in italics indicate fastest lap)

Year	Team	Car	Class	1	2	3	4	5	6	7	Pos.	Points
2020	Saintéloc Racing	Audi R8 LMS Evo	Pro-Am	IMO; 24	NÜR	SPA; 6H	SPA; 12H	SPA; 24H	LEC		20th	15
2021	Emil Frey Racing	Lamborghini Huracán GT3 Evo	Pro	MNZ; 23	LEC; 36	SPA; 6H; 56†	SPA; 12H; Ret	SPA; 24H; Ret	NÜR; 4	CAT; 8	17th	16
2022	Emil Frey Racing	Lamborghini Huracán GT3 Evo	Pro	IMO; Ret	LEC; Ret	SPA; 6H; 22	SPA; 12H; 15	SPA; 24H; 14	HOC; 14	CAT; Ret	NC	0
2023	CSA Racing	Audi R8 LMS Evo II	Bronze	MNZ; 37	LEC; 38					CAT; 38	NC	0
2023	CSA Racing	Audi R8 LMS Evo II	Pro-Am			SPA; 6H; 37	SPA; 12H; 35	SPA; 24H; 35	NÜR; Ret		11th	36
2024	CSA Racing	Audi R8 LMS Evo II	Gold	LEC; 18	SPA; 6H; 51	SPA; 12H; 54†	SPA; 24H; Ret	NÜR; 21	MNZ; 33	**JED**; Ret	4th	48
2025	CSA Racing	McLaren 720S GT3 Evo	Gold	LEC; 6	MNZ; Ret	SPA; 6H; 14	SPA; 12H; 13	SPA; 24H; 13	NÜR; 16	CAT; 31	3rd	94
2026	CSA Racing	McLaren 720S GT3 Evo	Gold	LEC; 8	MNZ; 33	SPA; 6H; 21	SPA; 12H; 14	SPA; 24H; 34	NÜR; 27	ALG	5th	64

==== GT World Challenge Europe Sprint Cup ====
(key) (Races in bold indicate pole position) (Races in italics indicate fastest lap)

Year	Team	Car	Class	1	2	3	4	5	6	7	8	9	10	Pos.	Points
2020	Saintéloc Racing	Audi R8 LMS Evo	Pro	MIS; 1; 5	MIS; 2; 3	MIS; 3; 2	MAG; 1; 9	MAG; 2; 5	ZAN; 1 Ret	ZAN; 2; 2	BAR; 1; 14	BAR; 2; 5	BAR; 2 Ret	7th	52.5
2021	Emil Frey Racing	Lamborghini Huracán GT3 Evo	Silver	MAG; 1; 3	MAG; 2; 8	ZAN; 1	ZAN; 2	MIS; 1	MIS; 2	BRH; 1; 8	BRH; 2; 20	VAL; 1; 9	VAL; 2 Ret	20th	14.5
2025	CSA Racing	McLaren 720S GT3 Evo	Gold	BRH; 1; 20	BRH; 2; 27									10th	9
2025	CSA Racing	McLaren 720S GT3 Evo	Bronze			ZAN; 1; 24	ZAN; 2; 24	MIS; 1; 37	MIS; 2; 28	MAG; 1 Ret	MAG; 2 WD	VAL; 1	VAL; 2	8th	31.5
2026	CSA Racing	McLaren 720S GT3 Evo	Gold	BRH; 1; 21	BRH; 2; 25	MIS; 1; 18	**MIS**; **2**; 15	MAG; 1; 19	**MAG**; **2**; 6	ZAN; 1; 28	ZAN; 2; 30	CAT; 1; 22	**CAT**; **2**; 37	7th	65.5

=== Complete ADAC GT Masters results ===
(key) (Races in bold indicate pole position) (Races in italics indicate fastest lap)

Year	Team	Car	1	2	3	4	5	6	7	8	9	10	11	12	13	14	DC	Points
2022	Emil Frey Racing	Lamborghini Huracán GT3 Evo	**OSC**; **1**; 2^{1}	OSC; 2; 13	RBR; 1; 10	RBR; 2; 17	ZAN; 1; 8	ZAN; 2; 3^{3}	NÜR; 1; 15	NÜR; 2; 8	LAU; 1; 6	LAU; 2; 14	SAC; 1; 9	SAC; 2; 6	HOC; 1; 2	HOC; 2; 11	5th	120

^{*} Season still in progress.

Sporting positions
Preceded by Yifei Ye	French F4 Championship; Champion; 2017	Succeeded by Caio Collet
